= Elizabeth Crowley =

American politician

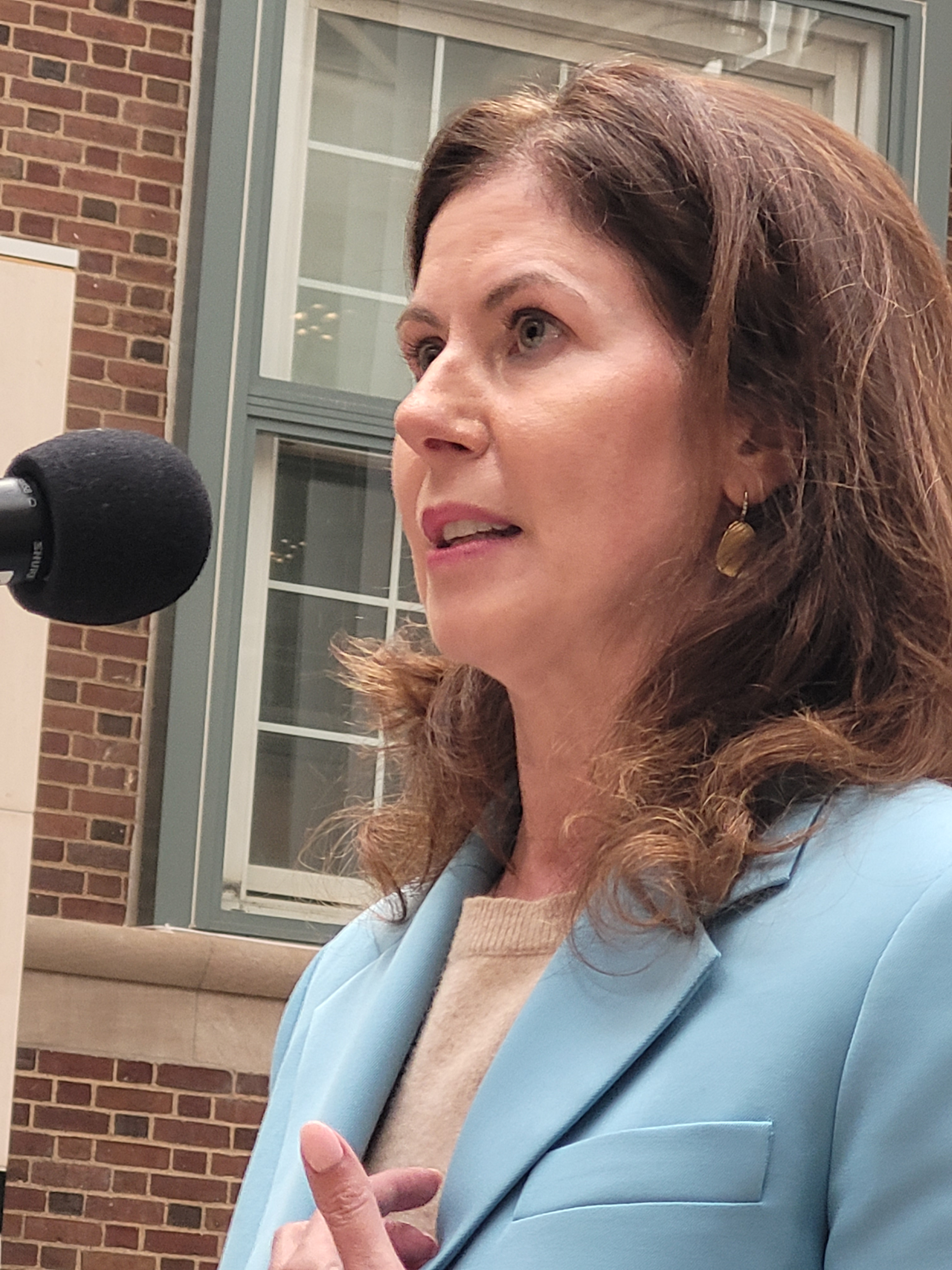
- Elizabeth Crowley in New York City in September 2025

Member of the New York City Council from the 30th district
- In office January 1, 2009 – December 31, 2017
- Preceded by: Anthony Como
- Succeeded by: Robert Holden

Personal details
- Born: November 27, 1977 (age 48) Queens, New York, U.S.
- Party: Democratic
- Spouse: Dennis O'Hara (divorced)
- Children: 2
- Relatives: Joe Crowley (cousin); Patrick Martinez (cousin)
- Education: Fashion Institute of Technology (BA); Pratt Institute (MS)
- Website: Official website

Elizabeth S. Crowley (born November 27, 1977) is an American politician and trade association executive who has been president and chief executive officer of the Building Trades Employers' Association since 2023. She was previously the New York City Council member for the 30th district from 2009 to 2017, representing the neighborhoods of Glendale, Maspeth, Middle Village, Ridgewood, and parts of Woodside and Woodhaven, in the borough of Queens. Crowley was both the first woman and first Democrat to hold the seat. Crowley was a 2021 candidate for Queens Borough President. She is a cousin of former U.S. Congressman Joseph Crowley. Crowley lost her Council seat to Robert Holden in 2017 and was subsequently an unsuccessful candidate in the Democratic primaries for Queens Borough President in 2020 and 2021 and for the New York State Senate in 2022.

== Early life and education ==
Crowley was born in Queens, the 14th of 15 children in a politically active family. Her father, Walter, was a local Democratic district leader and City Council member during the 1980s. Crowley's mother, Mary, served on the local School Board 24 for a number of years. Following Walter's death in office in 1985, Mary was appointed to complete the remainder of his term. This made Crowley the third member of her immediate family to serve in the City Council.

She grew up in Elmhurst, Queens.

Crowley is the cousin of former U.S. Congressman Joseph Crowley, who served as vice chair of the House Democratic Caucus and as Democratic Party chair in Queens County.

Crowley holds a B.A. in restoration and preservation from the Fashion Institute of Technology and an M.S. in city and regional planning from Pratt Institute. Before entering office she worked as a restorative painter on historic preservation projects, including at Radio City Music Hall and St. Patrick's Cathedral. She is a member of District Council 9 of the International Union of Painters and Allied Trades.

== Career ==
=== City Council elections ===
Crowley first sought elected office in 2001, at the age of 23, entering the Democratic primary for the 30th district seat, which was being vacated by the term-limited Republican Tom Ognibene. Her opponents were Robert Cermeli and Linda Sansivieri. The seat was won that year by Republican Dennis P. Gallagher, who held it until 2008.

On March 17, 2008, Republican City Council Member Dennis P. Gallagher resigned after pleading guilty to two misdemeanor counts of sexual abuse, creating a vacancy in the 30th district. Mayor Michael Bloomberg subsequently called a special election for the following June 3 to fill Gallagher's vacant seat. On May 8, Crowley announced her candidacy, joining a crowded field that included Gallagher's predecessor Tom Ognibene, a Republican who held the seat until term-limited from office in 2001, city Elections Board Commissioner Anthony Como, civic leader Charles Ober, and attorney Joseph Suraci. Crowley and Como received the backing of the county Democratic and Republican parties, respectively, with Ober picking up the Independence Party line. Neither Crowley nor Como appeared at a candidates' debate held during the campaign. Como led by about 70 votes on election night, with the outcome dependent on absentee ballots; he was subsequently certified the winner by 41 votes.

Four months after Como's close victory, Como faced Crowley in the 2008 general election. Crowley expected to benefit from a higher turnout due to the candidacy of Barack Obama in a district where registered Democrats outnumbered Republicans 2-to-1. On election day, Crowley defeated Como by 4,369 votes. Her win formed part of a wider Democratic gain in Queens that November, in which the borough's Republicans lost several seats.

For the third time in 17 months, Crowley ran for the 30th District during the 2009 citywide elections. This time, Crowley faced Ognibene, who had sat out the second 2008 race after the county Republicans passed him over by endorsing Como, despite his stated interest in running. Ognibene criticized Crowley's tenure in the Council as "ineffective", while Crowley described her challenger as "out of touch". Crowley outraised Ognibene and won the November election with 59.8 percent of the vote.

In 2012, Crowley ran for the Democratic nomination in New York's 6th congressional district, which was won by Grace Meng. In July of that year she received the smallest discretionary funding allocation of any Queens member of the City Council. Crowley was re-elected to the Council in 2013, defeating the Republican Craig Caruana. Citizens Union made no endorsement in the district.

In the 2017 New York City Council election, Crowley won the September Democratic primary with about 62 percent of the vote against Robert Holden, then president of the Juniper Park Civic Association. Holden, a Democrat, subsequently ran in the general election on the Republican, Conservative, Reform and "Dump de Blasio" ballot lines and defeated Crowley by 137 votes. Crowley conceded the following day. City & State reported that Holden had won despite Crowley holding the endorsement of Governor Andrew Cuomo and a campaign fund roughly ten times the size of his, and that a video appearing to show Crowley pushing aside a Holden canvasser had circulated widely during the campaign.

=== Later campaigns ===
Crowley finished second to Donovan Richards in the June 2020 Democratic primary for Queens Borough President and conceded on July 21. In the same month, the New York City Campaign Finance Board denied her campaign's petition to reconsider a determination on public matching funds.

Crowley ran for borough president again in 2021, in the first such contest conducted under ranked-choice voting. The count remained close through successive rounds of tabulation, and she conceded to Richards on July 19, 2021.

In February 2022, Crowley announced a campaign for the New York State Senate in the 59th district.

=== Legislative work ===
In 2010, when the city faced serious budget cuts and the Bloomberg administration planned to close as many as 20 firehouses, Crowley, as chair of the Council's Committee on Fire and Criminal Justice Services, joined other elected officials and community members in opposing the planned closures. Funding for the fire companies was restored in the adopted budget, an outcome for which the Council claimed credit as a body. Crowley criticized both the Bloomberg and de Blasio administrations over the reliability of the city's 911 system and the way the Fire Department reported ambulance response times. The city's overhaul of the 911 system was later found by the Department of Investigation and the city comptroller to have been affected by extensive outsourcing and cost overruns.

As chair of the Committee on Fire and Criminal Justice Services, Crowley also held oversight of the New York City Department of Correction and Rikers Island. In October 2014, following a report by the United States Attorney for the Southern District of New York that found a pattern and practice of excessive force against adolescents in the city's jails, her committee held a hearing at which members characterized the treatment of young detainees, including their placement in solitary confinement, as torture. In March 2015 the committee questioned the performance of the jails' medical provider.

Crowley supported efforts to preserve and expand city health services for women and sponsored legislation to expand access to HPV vaccinations, birth control and other women's health services. Crowley pressed the Fire Department to increase the number of women serving as firefighters, who at the end of 2014 numbered 44 out of about 10,500. She sponsored legislation, enacted as Local Law 44 of 2016, requiring companies receiving city contracts to report the gender and racial makeup of their board members and executives.

In March 2013, The New York Times reported that Council Speaker Christine Quinn had confronted Crowley over a statement to community newspapers in which Crowley took credit for saving local firehouses without crediting Quinn, and that Council funding for senior centers and youth sports programs in Crowley's district was cut days afterwards. Quinn said Crowley had committed "a completely inappropriate, attention-grabbing act", and, asked whether the funding cut was retaliation, replied, "It is what happened that year."

In 2013, Crowley joined advocates in successfully lobbying the city's New York City Landmarks Preservation Commission (LPC) to confer landmark status on the century-old Forest Park Carousel, one of the last works of master carver Daniel Carl Muller.

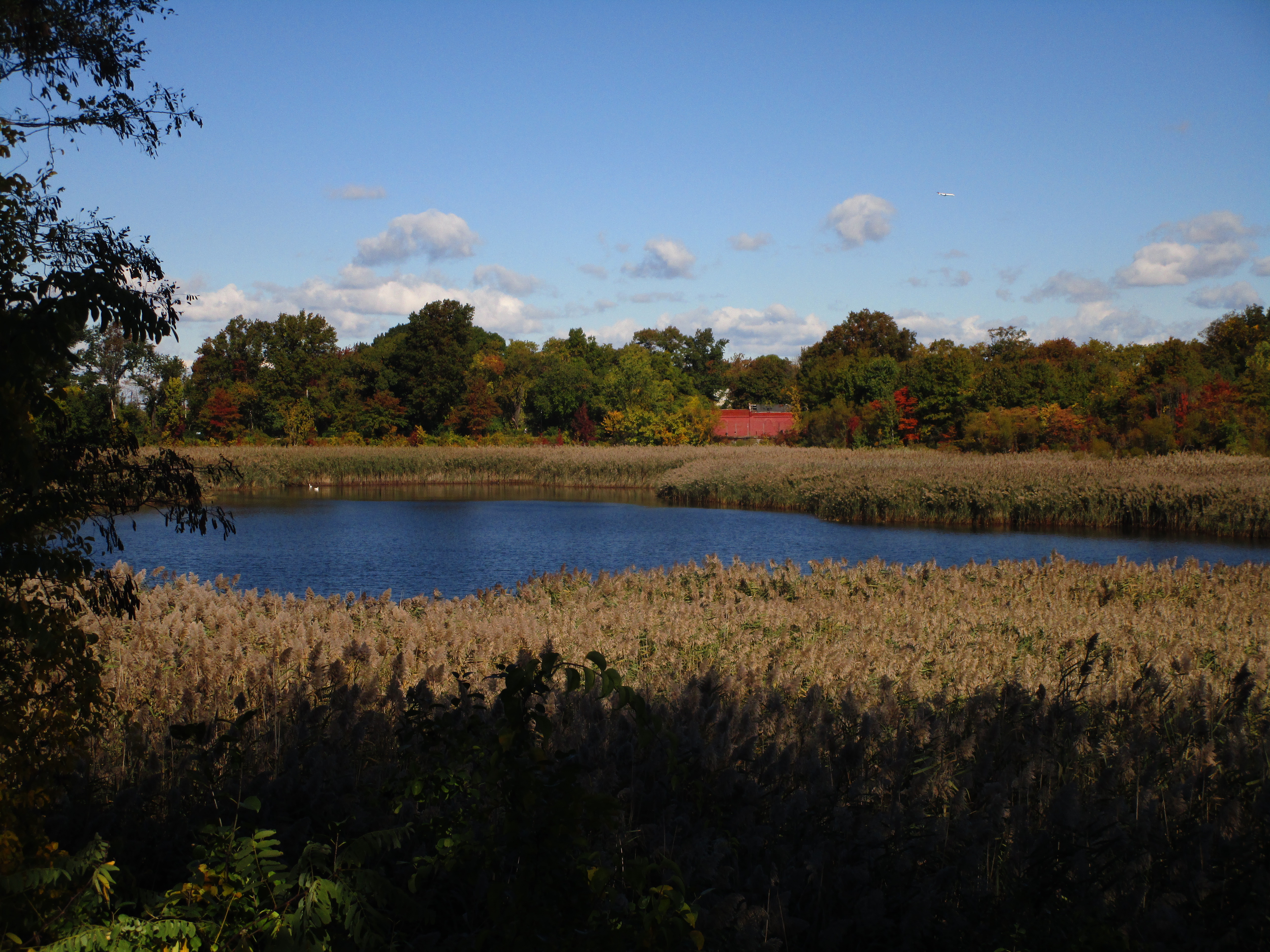
Ridgewood Reservoir

That same year, a nature preserve reopened at the former Ridgewood Reservoir, a decommissioned 19th-century reservoir in Highland Park on the Brooklyn–Queens border. The city Parks Department under Mayor Bloomberg had previously announced a number of proposals that would have limited public access to the site and installed sports facilities and comfort stations in two of the reservoir's three basins. In response to local opposition and a petition, Crowley joined fellow elected officials in writing to New York Governor Andrew Cuomo to oppose the city's plan.

In November 2016, Crowley presided over a ceremony to officially inaugurate the Central Ridgewood Historic District, a 40-block area including nearly 1,000 historic homes and buildings. At the time of its designation, Central Ridgewood was the largest historic district in the borough of Queens, and the third largest in the city after Manhattan's Greenwich Village and Brooklyn's Sunset Park.

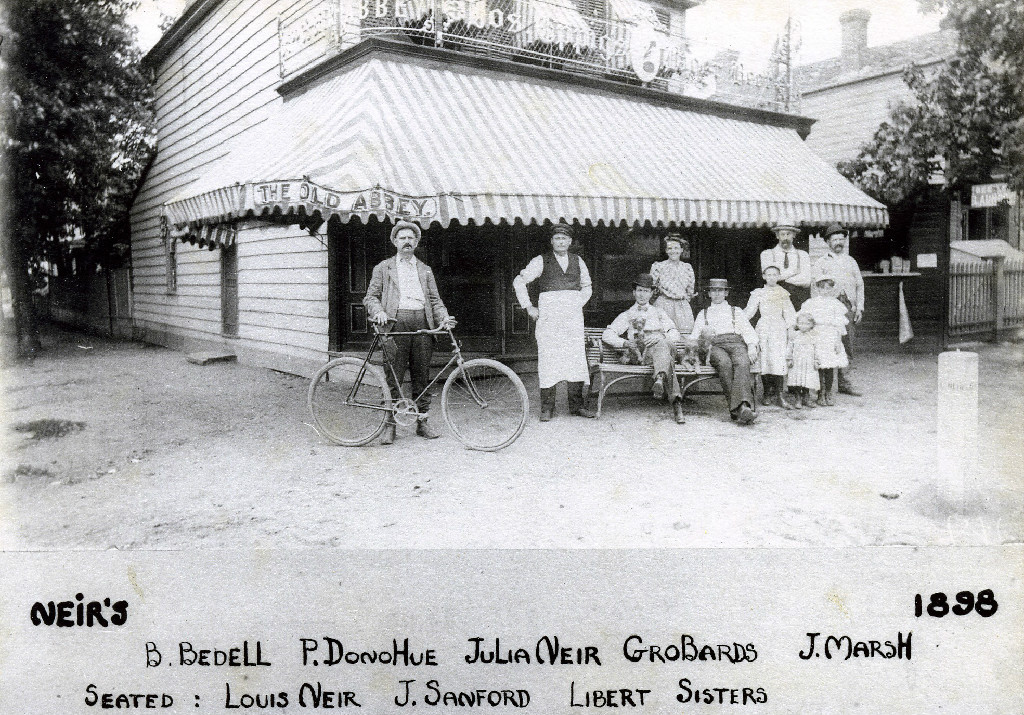
Neir's Tavern (1898)

Starting in 2015, Crowley joined preservationists and local residents in mounting a campaign to landmark historic Neir's Tavern in Woodhaven. Considered to be the oldest bar in the city, it has been a neighborhood watering hole for more than 180 years and was featured in the Martin Scorsese film Goodfellas. In May 2016, Crowley attended a rally at the tavern with more than 100 local residents to call on the LPC to recognize the building. Crowley criticized the body for failing to prioritize the landmarking of historic sites in the borough. The proposal was rejected by the LPC, according to the bar's owner, because "Neir's Tavern does not rise to the level of significance to warrant landmark status" and because landmark status would not protect the site from future development.

In August 2016, city officials announced plans to house 110 homeless adult families at a Holiday Inn Express in Maspeth. Crowley declared her opposition to the planned shelter, noting the impact on the community of two existing homeless shelters along Queens Boulevard and pledging to "[work] with community leaders and residents" to halt the Maspeth proposal. The following week, New York City Department of Homeless Services Commissioner Steve Banks held a public meeting to present the plan to the community, drawing more than 1,000 residents opposed to the plan. Crowley also addressed the crowd, reiterating her opposition to the plan. Speakers from the floor told prospective shelter residents to "go back to East New York". Local reporting questioned why Crowley and two other local lawmakers did not attend a march against the shelter later that month. In September 2016, Crowley joined other elected officials in a lawsuit against the city over the proposal; the court dismissed it within two months. The hotel's owner withdrew from the arrangement and the city abandoned the plan in October 2016.

In 2011, Crowley secured about $2 million in city funding toward acquiring the former St. Saviour's Church site in Maspeth for use as a park. The purchase did not take place, the site was developed as warehouses, and Holden cited the outcome against Crowley during the 2017 campaign.

== Post-Council career ==
Crowley co-founded 21 in '21, later renamed The New Majority NYC, a nonprofit organization formed to increase the number of women serving in the New York City Council; the Council reached a female majority for the first time in its history in 2021.

In 2023, Crowley became president and chief executive officer of the Building Trades Employers' Association, a New York City construction industry group founded in 1903, succeeding Louis Coletti and becoming the first woman to lead the organization. In the role she has spoken for contractors on workforce and construction safety issues and has campaigned for changes to New York's Scaffold Law. In June 2026, she was named to Council Speaker Julie Menin's advisory group on housing affordability.

== Controversies ==
In April 2017, Council Member Eric Ulrich filed a complaint with the city Conflicts of Interest Board alleging that Crowley had used her office to prompt enforcement action by several agencies against a bar outside her district following an altercation involving her sons. A spokesman for Crowley said the complaint was politically motivated and noted that Ulrich had received campaign contributions from a part-owner of the bar.

During the 2021 borough president primary, Crowley's campaign sent leaflets designed to resemble eviction notices to addresses in Jackson Heights, Elmhurst and Corona. Assembly Member Catalina Cruz said the campaign could have made the same point without playing on residents' fear of eviction, and Crowley's campaign manager defended the mailing.

In July 2021, Borough President Donovan Richards publicly accused Crowley of racism during the campaign, alleging among other things that she had said she would win because the Black Lives Matter movement would fade, and that she had pressed him for a job. Crowley denied the allegations and described them as slanderous and untruthful.

In January 2020, ahead of her first borough president campaign, Crowley pledged not to accept campaign contributions from real estate developers. In August 2022, NYC Forward, a super PAC funded in equal parts by the political arm of the Real Estate Board of New York, two real estate firms and two painters' union committees, spent about $250,000 in support of her State Senate campaign.

== Election history ==
Election history
Location	Year	Election	Results
NYC Council District 30	2001	Democratic primary	√ Elizabeth Crowley 45.94% Linda Sansivieri 32.35% Robert Cermeli 21.71%
NYC Council District 30	2001	General	√ Dennis P. Gallagher (R) 58.89% Elizabeth Crowley (D) 40.20% Sharain Pereira (Green) .91%
NYC Council District 30	2008	Special	√ Anthony Como (R) 31.64% Elizabeth Crowley (D) 31.11% Tom Ognibene (R) 27.34% Charles Ober (D) 9.92%
NYC Council District 30	2009	General	√ Elizabeth Crowley (D) 59.76% Tom Ognibene (R) 40.23%
New York 6	2012	Democratic primary	√ Grace Meng 52.98% Rory Lancman 25.33% Elizabeth Crowley 16.46% Robert Mittman 5.23%
NYC Council District 30	2013	General	√ Elizabeth Crowley (D) 58.94% Craig Caruana (R) 40.96%
NYC Council District 30	2017	Democratic primary	√ Elizabeth Crowley 62.49% Robert Holden 35.38%
NYC Council District 30	2017	General	√ Robert Holden (R) 49.60% Elizabeth Crowley (D) 49.40%
Queens Borough President	2020	Democratic primary	√ Donovan J. Richards 33.75% Elizabeth Crowley 27.22% Costa Constantinides 17.02% Anthony Miranda 11.78% Dao Yin 4.41%
Queens Borough President	2021	Democratic primary	Round 2 Donovan J. Richards 41.3% Elizabeth Crowley 41.2% XJimmy Van Bramer 17.6% Round 3 √ Donovan J. Richards 50.3% Elizabeth Crowley 49.7%
NY State Senate District 59	2022	Democratic primary	√ Kristen Gonzalez 57.01% Elizabeth Crowley 31.89% Michael Corbett 6.35%

== Personal life ==
Crowley was married to Dennis O'Hara, a New York City police officer. They have two sons, Dennis and Owen. She lives in Glendale, Queens with her sons.

Political offices
Preceded by Anthony Como	New York City Council, New York City's 30th City Council district 2009–2017	Succeeded by Robert Holden
