= New York's 59th State Senate district =

American legislative district

Senator
Kristen Gonzalez; D–Long Island City
- Registration: 67.5% Democratic; 8% Republican; 22.4% No party preference
- Demographics: 54% White; 5% Black; 17% Hispanic; 17% Asian; 6% Multiracial
- Population (2024): 294,227
- Registered voters: 224,722

New York's 59th State Senate district is one of 63 districts in the New York State Senate. It has been represented by Democrat Kristen Gonzalez since 2023.

== Geography ==
=== 2020s ===
District 59 was moved as part of the 2020 redistricting to encompass parts of Queens, Brooklyn, and Manhattan. The district includes the neighborhoods of Astoria, Long Island City, Greenpoint, Williamsburg, Stuyvesant Town, Kips Bay, and Murray Hill.

The district overlaps with New York's 7th, 10th 12th, and 14th congressional districts, the 34th, 36th, 37th, 50th, 53rd, 73rd, and 74th districts of the New York State Assembly, and the 2nd, 4th, 22nd, 26th, 33rd and 34th districts of the New York City Council.

=== 2010s ===
District 59 stretched from the eastern suburbs of Buffalo to the southwestern suburbs of Rochester, including all of Wyoming County and parts of Erie, Livingston, and Monroe counties. The district overlapped with New York's 25th, 26th, and 27th congressional districts, and with the 133rd, 138th, 142nd, 143rd, 144th, and 147th districts of the New York State Assembly.

== List of office holders ==
Name	Party	In office	Counties	Notes
Dale M. Volker	Republican	1983 – December 31, 2010	Erie, Livingston, Ontario, Wyoming	
Patrick M. Gallivan	Republican	January 1, 2011 – December 31, 2022	Erie, Livingston, Monroe, Wyoming	Redistricted to the 60th district.
Kristen Gonzalez	Democratic	January 1, 2023 – present	Brooklyn, Manhattan, Queens	New seat.

== Recent election results ==
=== 2026 ===
2026 New York State Senate election, District 59
Party	Candidate	Votes	%
Democratic	Kristen Gonzalez	59,694	76.6
Working Families	Kristen Gonzalez	17,206	22.1
Total	Kristen Gonzalez (incumbent)	76,900	98.7
Write-in		1,049	1.3
Total votes		77,949	100.0

=== 2024 ===
2024 New York State Senate election, District 59
Primary election
Party	Candidate	Votes	%
Democratic	Kristen Gonzalez (incumbent)	14,870	85.1
Democratic	Gus Lambropoulous	2,543	14.6
Write-in		58	0.3
Total votes		17,471	100.0
General election
Democratic	Kristen Gonzalez	84,379	
Working Families	Kristen Gonzalez	15,694	
Total	Kristen Gonzalez (incumbent)	100,073	98.9
Write-in		1,141	1.1
Total votes		101,214	100.0
Democratic hold			

=== 2022 ===
2022 New York State Senate election, District 59
Primary election
Party	Candidate	Votes	%
Democratic	Kristen Gonzalez	13,770	57.8
Democratic	Elizabeth Crowley	7,813	32.8
Democratic	Michael Corbett	1,557	6.5
Democratic	Nomiki Konst	375	1.6
Democratic	Francoise Olivas	271	1.1
Write-in		48	0.2
Total votes		23,834	100.0
General election
Democratic	Kristen Gonzalez	56,339	
Working Families	Kristen Gonzalez	12,711	
Total	Kristen Gonzalez	69,050	98.9
Write-in		766	1.1
Total votes		69,816	100.0
Democratic win (new boundaries)			

=== 2020 ===
2020 New York State Senate election, District 59
Party	Candidate	Votes	%
Republican	Patrick Gallivan	86,244	
Conservative	Patrick Gallivan	15,783	
Independence	Patrick Gallivan	4,031	
Total	Patrick Gallivan (incumbent)	106,058	67.4
Democratic	Jason Klimek	51,176	32.5
Write-in		86	0.1
Total votes		157,320	100.0
Republican hold			

=== 2018 ===
2018 New York State Senate election, District 59
Party	Candidate	Votes	%
Republican	Patrick Gallivan	67,140	
Conservative	Patrick Gallivan	14,280	
Independence	Patrick Gallivan	8,969	
Reform	Patrick Gallivan	1,349	
Total	Patrick Gallivan (incumbent)	91,738	99.5
Write-in		438	0.5
Total votes		92,176	100.0
Republican hold			

=== 2016 ===
2016 New York State Senate election, District 59
Party	Candidate	Votes	%
Republican	Patrick Gallivan	78,276	
Conservative	Patrick Gallivan	15,776	
Independence	Patrick Gallivan	5,576	
Reform	Patrick Gallivan	665	
Total	Patrick Gallivan (incumbent)	100,293	72.7
Democratic	Tom Casey	37,675	27.3
Write-in		19	0.0
Total votes		137,987	100.0
Republican hold			

=== 2014 ===
2014 New York State Senate election, District 59
Party	Candidate	Votes	%
Republican	Patrick Gallivan	49,409	
Conservative	Patrick Gallivan	13,300	
Independence	Patrick Gallivan	8,920	
Total	Patrick Gallivan (incumbent)	71,629	99.5
Write-in		346	0.5
Total votes		71,975	100.0
Republican hold			

=== 2012 ===
2012 New York State Senate election, District 59
Party	Candidate	Votes	%
Republican	Patrick Gallivan	71,907	
Independence	Patrick Gallivan	14,158	
Conservative	Patrick Gallivan	13,404	
Total	Patrick Gallivan (incumbent)	99,469	99.9
Write-in		109	0.1
Total votes		99,578	100.0
Republican hold			

=== Federal results in District 59 ===
Year	Office	Results
2020	President	Trump 55.2 – 42.7%
2016	President	Trump 57.8 – 37.1%
2012	President	Romney 53.2 – 45.0%
2012	Senate	Gillibrand 58.3 – 40.1%
