= Mark Grisanti =

American politician

Judge of the New York State Court of Claims
- In office 2015 – 2024 or 2025
- Succeeded by: Peter Weinmann

Member of the New York Senate from the 60th district
- In office January 1, 2011 – December 31, 2014
- Preceded by: Antoine Thompson
- Succeeded by: Marc Panepinto

Personal details
- Born: Mark John Grisanti
- Party: Democratic (before 2011); Republican (2011-present)
- Spouse: Maria Grisanti
- Education: Thomas M. Cooley Law School
- Profession: Lawyer, politician, judge

Mark John Grisanti (born October 21, 1964) is an American lawyer, politician, and former judge from New York.

After being elected to the New York State Senate in District 60 on the Republican Party line in 2010, Grisanti took office on January 3, 2011. Grisanti served in the State Senate from 2011 to 2014, when he was defeated in the Republican primary and lost his third-party bid for re-election in the general election. Grisanti is notable as one of four Republican members of the New York State Senate that voted in favor of the Marriage Equality Act in 2011.

Grisanti was appointed to the New York State Court of Claims in May 2015 and later became an Acting Justice of the Supreme Court of the State of New York, Eighth Judicial District. He was censured in 2024 for his conduct in a 2020 altercation with a police officer and for judging matters involving another attorney "with whom he had an ongoing financial relationship". Later in 2024, Gov. Kathy Hochul declined to re-appoint Grisanti to a new term on the Court of Claims; he was succeeded by Peter Weinmann.

== Early life, education, and early career ==
Grisanti was raised in Buffalo as the youngest of six brothers and sisters. He graduated from Canisius College and Thomas M. Cooley Law School. After graduating from law school, Grisanti worked at the law firm that his grandfather had founded in 1921.

== New York State Senate career ==
=== Elections ===
==== 2008 State Senate campaign ====
Grisanti was defeated in the 2008 Democratic primary for the 60th Senate District, losing heavily to Antoine Thompson, 72 to 28 percent; Thompson went on to win the Senate seat in the state's 2008 general election.

==== 2010 State Senate campaign ====
Grisanti stood for election to the State Senate again in the 2010 election; this time, he ran as a Republican. During his campaign, Grisanti declared himself to be "unalterably opposed" to same-sex marriage.

Grisanti defeated incumbent Senator Antoine Thompson by 525 votes. His victory, which was initially challenged, was considered an upset. Grisanti's victory helped the GOP obtain regain the Senate majority by a slender 32-30 margin.

As of 2011, the 60th Senate District was the most Democratic-leaning of the all Republican-held Senate seats, with 104,000 registered Democrats and 22,000 registered Republicans. Although Grisanti was a registered Democrat during the race, he received a waiver to run on the Republican line. Following Election Day, he agreed to caucus with Senate Republicans and to switch his party registration to Republican.

==== 2012 State Senate campaign ====
In 2012, Grisanti received significant support and visibility from Senate Republicans; the party engaged in a "Protect Grisanti" effort to increase his electability in the lead-up to the elections. According to The Buffalo News, he also received "significant contributions from the gay community" on the heels of his 2011 vote for same-sex marriage.

Grisanti faced a challenge in the Republican primary for the 60th district from attorney Kevin Stocker of Kenmore, NY. Grisanti won the primary with a 60 percent to 40 percent margin after a campaign in which "much of the bitterest politicking had revolved around Grisanti's controversial 2011 vote to support legalizing same-sex marriage in the state." "We took the high road, because we don't care about the smut, we care about what is important for the residents of Western New York," Grisanti said. Grisanti's primary campaign was more successful than the primary campaigns of the other two Senate Republicans who voted for same-sex marriage and ran for re-election; Sen. Stephen Saland barely defeated his primary challenger, while Sen. Roy J. McDonald was defeated by Kathy Marchione.

Grisanti's same-sex marriage vote also cost him the Conservative Party line. Both the Conservative Party and the National Organization for Marriage endorsed Charles Swanick to run against Sen. Grisanti in 2012.

Grisanti won re-election in the 2012 general election, receiving 63,683 votes. Democratic candidate Michael L. Amodeo came in second with 45,140 votes, Charles Swanick received 15,027 votes on the Conservative line, and Gregory Davis received 3,078 votes on the Working Families Party line.

==== 2014 State Senate campaign ====
Sen. Grisanti was defeated by Kevin Stocker in a Republican primary in September 2014. While Sen. Grisanti remained in the 2014 general election race on the Independence Party line, he finished in third place in a hotly contested election; the winner, Democrat Marc Panepinto, received only 3,681 votes more than Grisanti did.

=== Tenure ===
Grisanti had declared his opposition to same-sex marriage during his 2010 campaign. On June 24, 2011, following multiple meetings with Democratic New York Governor Andrew Cuomo, Grisanti voted in favor of the Marriage Equality Act, which allows gender-neutral marriages for both same- and opposite-sex couples in New York. Grisanti stated that he had researched the issue and that "a man can be wiser today than yesterday, but there can be no respect for that man if he has failed to do his duty." Grisanti was one of four Republican state senators that voted in favor of the Marriage Equality Act.

On February 11, 2012, Grisanti was involved in an altercation at a fundraising gala held at the Seneca Niagara Casino. The altercation involved a casino shareholder who accused the senator of hating the Seneca nation, which owns the casino. Grisanti said he had been attacked after trying to mediate a dispute, but some witnesses told reporters that he was the aggressor. No charges were filed.

In January 2013, Sen. Grisanti voted in favor of the NY SAFE Act, a controversial gun control measure.

Also in 2013, Grisanti was a signatory to an amicus curiae brief submitted to the Supreme Court in support of same-sex marriage in the Hollingsworth v. Perry case.

== Judicial career ==
In April 2015, Grisanti was appointed to the New York State Court of Claims by Gov. Andrew Cuomo. Grisanti's appointment was confirmed by the New York State Senate on May 5, 2015. Court of Claims judges are appointed to nine-year terms. As of October 2018, Grisanti served as an Acting Justice of the New York State Supreme Court for the Eighth Judicial District.

Grisanti was investigated by the New York State Commission on Judicial Conduct in connection with a June 22, 2020 confrontation with members of the Buffalo Police Department. After police were called to a dispute between Grisanti and neighbors that became physical, police attempted to handcuff Grisanti's wife. A shirtless and intoxicated Grisanti pushed one of the officers, used profanities, stated that the officer "would be sorry" if his wife were not released, and stated that he knew the mayor. He also repeatedly yelled that his daughter and son-in-law were members of the Buffalo Police Department. Grisanti was handcuffed and placed in a police vehicle, but was not charged over the incident. However, video footage of the incident went viral and gained national media attention.

In April 2024, the New York State Commission on Judicial Conduct determined in a 6-4 vote that Grisanti should be censured for his conduct on June 22, 2020 and for judging matters involving another attorney "with whom he had an ongoing financial relationship". Four members of the Commission voted to remove Grisanti from the bench, which was the punishment that had been recommended by the Commission's Administrator.

On June 6, 2024, CBS News reported that New York Gov. Kathy Hochul would not reappoint Grisanti to a new term on the Court of Claims. On January 13, 2025, Peter Weinmann was sworn in to fill Grisanti's seat on the Court of Claims.

== See also ==
- List of American politicians who switched parties in office
- List of Canisius College people
- List of New York state senators
- List of people from Buffalo, New York

New York State Senate
Preceded by Antoine Thompson	New York State Senate; 60th District; 2011–2014	Succeeded by Marc Panepinto
Preceded by Antoine Thompson	Chairman of the Committee on Environmental Conservation; 2011–2014	Succeeded by ?
