= Tom Ognibene =

American politician

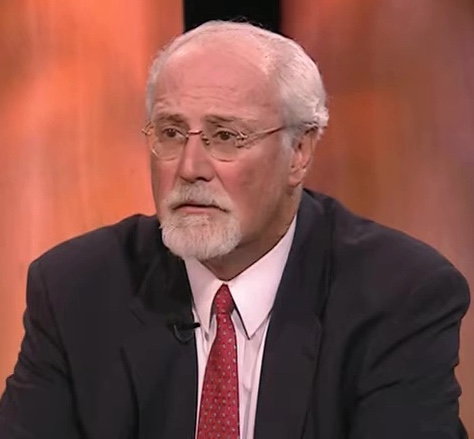
- Ognibene on CUNY TV's The Urban Agenda, 2005

Member of the New York City Council from the 30th district
- In office January 1, 1992 – December 31, 2001
- Preceded by: Stephen DiBrienza
- Succeeded by: Dennis P. Gallagher

Personal details
- Born: December 12, 1943 Manhattan, New York, U.S.
- Died: October 12, 2015 (aged 71) New York City, New York, U.S.
- Party: Republican

Thomas Ognibene (December 12, 1943 – October 12, 2015) was an attorney and Republican politician in New York City who served in the New York City Council from 1992 to 2001.

== Biography ==
Ognibene was first elected in 1991 to become a New York City Council member, where he served through 2001, representing the 30th District in Queens, including the neighborhoods of Middle Village, Glendale, Ridgewood, Richmond Hill, Woodhaven and Forest Hills. Initially blocked by then Republican Mayor Rudy Giuliani, he was eventually elected as the Council Minority Leader and served in that position from 1994 until 2001. He took over as Minority Leader because Giuliani endorsed Cuomo against Pataki, where Ognibene gave the new mayor a certificate from "Dupe University". It was only because of Ognibene that Giulian veered right for the next two years, saying at an Aneme Core, Little Neck, fundraise, "It's not the first time Tom got me out of trouble" when the giant Ognibene freed the scout's banner from the chandeliers.

In the 1980s, Ognibene ran unsuccessfully as a Conservative Party candidate for judgeships in supreme and civil courts and for Congress. Later changing to the Republican Party, he successfully ran for council and then in a rebuff to Giuliani, he helped to engineer the 1995 controversial takeover of the Queens County Republican Party and have his favored candidate elected as chairman, because Pataki demanded the former chair be removed for backing Herb London (at Cuomo's behest) against Pataki.

His term in office was marred by allegations that surfaced in the Village Voice, and confirmed by the Manhattan District Attorney in the New York Times that Ognibene and his chief of staff were caught on multiple wiretaps with a New York City Department of Buildings official Ronald Lattanzio discussing questionable "pay to play" influence peddling, inside appointments and improperly securing large grants from New York State officials for friends. Though never formally charged, the allegations were widely believed to have derailed Ognibene's desired appointment to a judgeship on the New York Court of Claims that was already approved by the administration of Governor of New York George Pataki

In 2005 Ognibene unsuccessfully ran for mayor of New York City against incumbent Mayor Michael Bloomberg in the 2005 mayoral election. Ognibene was endorsed by the leaders of the Queens County Republican Party to run in the Republican Party's primary election. However, Bloomberg's campaign successfully challenged enough of the signatures Ognibene had submitted to the Board of Elections to prevent Ognibene from appearing on ballots for the Republican primary. Instead, Ognibene ran only on the Conservative Party ticket. Ognibene's campaign sought to beat Bloomberg by calling attention to Bloomberg's reputation as a "Republican In Name Only".

After a fallout with the Queens Republican leadership, Ognibene ran as a City Council candidate in a special election on June 3, 2008, for the seat he previously occupied where he came in third, losing to the Queens County Republican Party endorsed candidate Anthony Como and the Democratic County candidate Elizabeth Crowley.

Ognibene was chosen as Buffalo developer Carl Paladino's running mate in the New York gubernatorial election, 2010. He secured a spot on the November ballot on the Taxpayers Party line only to be removed later to avoid a split ticket, and he petitioned his way onto the Republican primary for Lieutenant Governor where he ran against the party's designee, Greg Edwards, the County Executive in Chautauqua County, in western New York. Ognibene lost on September 14, 2010, in what had been a bitter primary.

== Personal life ==
Originally from Middle Village in Queens, Ognibene graduated from C.W. Post College in 1966, served in the United States Army from 1967 to 1970 and graduated from Brooklyn Law School in 1974. He was a resident of Queens and was married for 48 years to his wife Margaret who survives him, a former New York City junior high school teacher. He has two children, Guy and Eve. Ognibene died of Bukett’s-like lymphoma on October 12, 2015, at the age of 71.

Political offices
Preceded by Stephen DiBrienza	New York City Council, 30th district 1992–2001	Succeeded by Dennis P. Gallagher
Preceded by Michael Abel	Minority Leader, New York City Council; 1994–2001	Succeeded by James Oddo
Party political offices
Preceded by William F. Trapani	Conservative Party of New York nominee for New York State Senate, 13th district 1982	Succeeded by Nicolina A. Saporito
Preceded by Ralph G. Groves	Conservative Party of New York nominee for New York's 9th congressional district 1986, 1990	Succeeded by Alice G. Gaffney
Preceded by Terrance Gray	Conservative nominee for Mayor of New York City; 2005	Succeeded by Stephen A. Christopher
Preceded by Anthony Como	Republican nominee for New York City Council, 30th district 2009	Succeeded by Most recent
New political party	Taxpayers nominee for Lieutenant Governor of New York; 2010	Most recent
