= Senator Gallivan =

Senator Gallivan may refer to:

- James A. Gallivan (1866–1928), Massachusetts State Senate
- Patrick M. Gallivan (born 1960), New York State Senate
