= Unico (disambiguation) =

Unico is an anime franchise.

Unico or UNICO may also refer to:

- UNICO, technology transfer organisation
- Unico National
- Unico Properties, American real estate development company based in Seattle, Washington
- Unico Wilhelm van Wassenaer (1692–1766), diplomat and composer
- Unico (wine), notable Spanish wine label produced by Vega Sicilia
- Único, album by Abel Pintos
- Único (album), a 2009 album by Alejandra Guzmán
- "Unico" (song), a 2016 song by Lali Espósito
- Unico, a Canadian-based food processing company producing various canned and dried products including dried pasta, canned tomatoes, canned beans, and olive oil

== See also ==
- Unikko; an iconic family of floral (poppy) fabric patterns from the Marimekko company.
- UNICOPAY; see TIPANET
- UNICOS, operating system
