= New Yorkers for Constitutional Freedoms =

Political advocacy group in New York

- Founded: 1983
- Type: 501(c)(4) non-profit
- Purpose: Christian conservative political advocacy
- Location: Spencerport, New York
- Region served: New York
- Key people: Jason J. McGuire (Executive Director)
- Website: NYFamilyAction.org

New Yorkers for Constitutional Freedoms (NYCF) is a non-profit Christian conservative political advocacy group in the state of New York. In March 2024, the organization became known as New York Families Action.

== History ==
New Yorkers for Constitutional Freedoms was founded in 1983. NYCF's educational arm, New Yorker's Family Research Foundation, was formed in 1990. NYCF is a conservative statewide advocacy organization of evangelical Christians.

NYCF vocally opposed the passage of the Marriage Equality Act in 2011. After the Act was passed, NYCF set up a "Courage Fund" to "assist courageous municipal clerks and other people of conscience in New York State who oppose same-sex 'marriage' from harassment, denial of rightful promotion, or unfair termination for invoking New York State law protecting their sincerely-held religious beliefs". After Barker town clerk Laura Fotusky resigned rather than be forced to sign same-sex marriage licenses, NYCF pledged to match the $25,000 salary she gave up in resigning.

On July 25, 2011, NYCF filed a lawsuit seeking to enjoin the enforcement of the Marriage Equality Act; the suit alleged violations of the law in the process by which the bill was passed. On November 18, 2011, Acting Supreme Court Justice Robert B. Wiggins allowed the plaintiffs' claims under the Open Meetings Law, but dismissed other portions of the case. On July 6, 2012, a five-judge panel of the Appellate Division ruled unanimously that no violation of the Open Meetings Law had occurred and dismissed the suit. The New York Court of Appeals, the state's highest court, declined to hear an appeal.

In March 2015, former U.S. Sen. Rick Santorum spoke at a NYCF lobby day in Albany.

NYCF opposed the passage of a 2019 abortion rights law known as the Reproductive Health Act, lobbying against the legislation for 12 years. The organization is also notable for its opposition to the Gender Expression Non-Discrimination Act and to assisted suicide.

During the COVID-19 pandemic, NYCF pushed back against pandemic restrictions on religious gatherings and urged Gov. Andrew Cuomo to reopen the New York State Capitol to public access.

In October 2022, NYCF and 25 churches filed a lawsuit alleging that the Concealed Carry Improvement Act, a New York gun control law, unconstitutionally deprived New Yorkers of the right to defend themselves while attending church services.

In March 2024, the organization became known as New York Families Action.
