= Stephen DiBrienza =

American politician (born 1954)

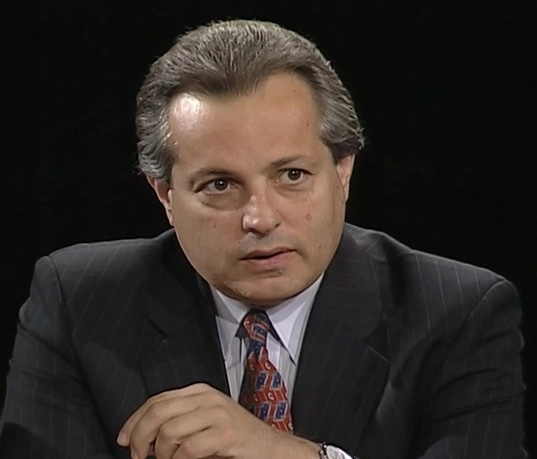
- Stephen DiBrienza on CUNY TV's Urban Agenda, 1999

Member of the New York City Council from the 39th district
- In office January 1, 1992 – December 31, 2001
- Preceded by: District created
- Succeeded by: Bill de Blasio

Member of the New York City Council from the 30th district
- In office January 1, 1986 – December 31, 1991
- Preceded by: Thomas J. Cuite
- Succeeded by: Tom Ognibene

Personal details
- Born: December 9, 1954 (age 71) Brooklyn, New York, U.S.
- Party: Democratic

Stephen DiBrienza (born December 9, 1954) is an American politician who served in the New York City Council from 1986 to 2001.
