= Nomiki Konst =

American activist and political commentator

- Born: Nomiki Daphne Konst; January 27, 1984 (age 41); Tucson, Arizona, U.S.
- Occupations: Activist; Journalist; Political Commentator
- Years active: 2012–present

Nomiki Daphne Konst (born January 27, 1984) is an American journalist, progressive activist, and political commentator who is known for her work on The Young Turks and Our Revolution. In 2019, Konst was a candidate for New York City Public Advocate. She was a candidate in the Democratic primaries of the 2022 New York State Senate election, for the 59th district, scheduled on August 23, 2022; she eventually dropped out and endorsed her former opponent, Kristen Gonzalez.

== Early life and education ==
Konst was born in Tucson, Arizona, and as a child she moved with her family to Buffalo, New York. Her mother was a legislator in Erie County, New York, and also served as a "Commissioner of Economic Development". All four of her grandparents were Greek. Her paternal grandfather (whose surname was Κωνσταντάκης [Konstantákis]) is from Cephalonia, her paternal grandmother was from Kalymnos and her maternal grandparents were members of the ethnic Greek minority in southern Albania.

== Politics ==
Konst served as a national co-chair on Barack Obama's 2012 presidential re-election campaign. In 2012, Konst announced her intention to run for Arizona's 2nd congressional district, but withdrew prior to the primaries. In 2016, she was a national surrogate for Bernie Sanders' presidential campaign and she served on the Democratic National Convention's platform committee. After the 2016 Democratic National Convention, she served on the party's Unity Reform Commission, which reviewed the party's nominating process. Konst also worked for Our Revolution, a progressive political action organization and offshoot of the Bernie Sanders 2016 presidential campaign. She was also appointed as a national surrogate in Sanders' 2020 presidential campaign.

In 2018, Konst announced her candidacy in the 2019 New York City Public Advocate special election. Politico described her campaign as ambitious; including her proposals to decentralize the role to a representative in every borough, integrate the New York City Department of Investigation into the Advocate's office, and remove the office from the mayoral line of succession.

In June 2022, she announced her intention to run in the Democratic primaries of the 2022 New York State Senate election, for the 59th district; scheduled on August 23, 2022. She eventually dropped out and endorsed her former opponent, Kristen Gonzalez.

== Activism ==
In 2011, Konst became an anti-fracking activist, and was involved in a successful campaign to ban fracking in New York.

Konst was a vocal opponent of the Independent Democratic Conference; a group of Democratic New York State senators who routinely sided with Republicans to block progressive agenda items.

In 2019, Konst co-founded Matriarch, a progressive advocacy group dedicated to getting working-class women elected to public office. In 2020, Cori Bush, one of Matriarch's founding members, was elected to the United States House of Representatives.

During her 2019 campaign for New York's Public Advocate office, Konst joined efforts to sink a proposed deal between New York City and Amazon to establish the corporation's headquarters in Queens.

== Journalism ==
In 2012, Konst and journalist Wayne Barrett founded the Accountability Project, a nonprofit investigative journalism outlet.

Konst hosted The Filter, a show on SiriusXM Progress radio. In 2015, she started uploading videos of interviews on her YouTube channel. She also worked for the liberal and progressive show The Young Turks as an investigative reporter until 2018.

Konst was a co-host on Rising at The Hill, where she provided political analysis and commentary.

Konst is currently the host of her own political commentary program, The Nomiki Show, and has contributed to several news outlets, including CBS News and CNN. She is also a frequent guest on progressive political shows, such as The Majority Report with Sam Seder.

== Personal life ==
Konst was in a ten-month relationship with the former mayor of New York City, Bill de Blasio, which ended in November 2025.
