= Marc Panepinto =

American politician

Member of the New York State Senate from the 60th district
- In office January 1, 2015 – January 1, 2017
- Preceded by: Mark Grisanti
- Succeeded by: Chris Jacobs

Personal details
- Born: Tonawanda, New York, U.S.
- Party: Democratic
- Spouse: Catherine Nugent
- Children: 3
- Education: University at Buffalo, University of Illinois
- Profession: Attorney

Marc C. Panepinto is an American attorney and Democratic politician from New York State.

Panepinto graduated from The University at Buffalo School of Law. He is a founding partner at the Buffalo law firm of Dolce Panepinto. Panepinto was convicted of misdemeanor election law violations in 2001.

Panepinto ran for the New York State Senate in the 60th district in the 2014 elections. He won the election, receiving 34% of the vote; Republican Party nominee Kevin Stocker finished with 30%, Independence Party nominee Mark Grisanti (the incumbent) received 28%, and Conservative Party nominee Timothy Gallagher (a paper candidate who did not campaign) received 8%.

Panepinto did not seek re-election in 2016. Following Panepinto's announcement that he would not seek re-election, the Erie County District Attorney's Office opened an investigation into claims of an underage drinking party at Panepinto's home.

On June 28, 2018, Panepinto pleaded guilty to federal corruption charges arising out of an attempted cover-up of unwanted sexual advances he made to a member of his Senate staff in January 2016. On December 14, 2018, Panepinto was sentenced to two months in prison. In December 2020, Panepinto's law license was suspended for one year. Panepinto was reinstated to the practice of law in January 2022.
