= Marriage Equality Act (New York) =

2011 law legalising same-sex marriage

New York State Legislature
- Full name: Marriage Equality Act
- Introduced: June 14, 2011
- Assembly voted: June 15, 2011
- Senate voted: June 24, 2011
- Signed into law: June 24, 2011
- Sponsor(s): Asm. Daniel O'Donnell, Sen. Thomas Duane
- Governor: Andrew Cuomo
- Code: Domestic Relations Law
- Section: Sections 10, 11, 13
- Resolution: AB A08354
- Website: Text of the bill and Text of an amendment

Status: Current legislation

The Marriage Equality Act is a 2011 landmark New York State law that made same-sex marriage legal. The bill was introduced in the New York State Assembly by Assemblyman Daniel O'Donnell and in the New York State Senate by Senator Thomas Duane. It was signed into law by Governor Andrew Cuomo on June 24, 2011, and took effect on July 24, 2011.

== Background ==
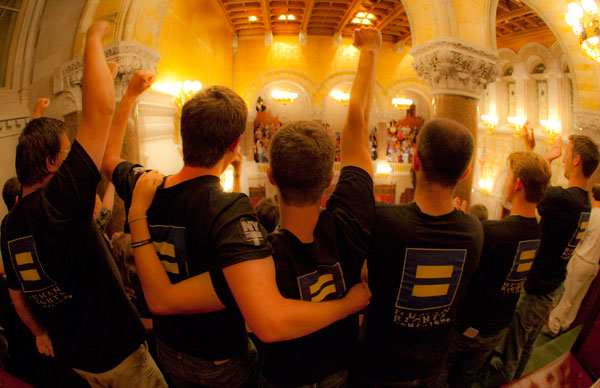
The moment of the Marriage Equality Act vote in balcony of the capital building in Albany, New York, the evening of July 24, 2011 photographed by Celebration Chapel of Kingston, New York. Persons in foreground are wearing t-shirts bearing the logo of the Human Rights Campaign, one of many organizations backing the bill.

On July 6, 2006, in Hernandez v. Robles, the New York Court of Appeals issued a 4–2 decision holding that New York law did not permit same-sex marriages and that there was no state constitutional right to same-sex marriage.

In June 2006, Westchester County Executive Andrew Spano issued an executive order, stating that Westchester County would officially recognize out-of-state marriages of same-sex couples the same way it recognizes marriages of different-sex couples. The Alliance Defending Freedom (ADF) sued. In a November 2009 decision in Godfrey v. Spano, the New York Court of Appeals held that Westchester County could lawfully extend government benefits to same-sex couples in out-of-state marriages.

In February 2008, the Supreme Court, Appellate Division, Fourth Department ruled unanimously in Martinez v. County of Monroe that because New York legally recognizes out-of-state marriages of opposite-sex couples, it must do the same for same-sex couples. On May 6, 2008, the Court of Appeals declined to hear Monroe County's appeal. In November 2008, Monroe County announced that it would not pursue any further appeals of the Appellate Division's decision.

== Prior legislative history ==
Following the Hernandez v Robles decision in 2006, the focus of the same-sex marriage battle shifted to the executive and legislative branches of government. During his successful campaign for governor, Attorney General Spitzer said that he would push to legalize same-sex marriage if elected. Same-sex marriage legislation passed the New York State Assembly for the first time on June 19, 2007, by a vote of 85–61. The bill languished in the Republican-controlled Senate before dying and being returned to the Assembly.

Governor David Paterson introduced same-sex marriage legislation on April 16, 2009. The Assembly passed a same-sex marriage bill on May 12, 2009, with a majority of 89–52, but the bill languished in the Senate during the November 10 special session. It was re-passed by the Assembly on December 2, but the Senate--then led by Democrats--defeated it on the same day by a vote of 38–24. All Senate Republicans voted against the bill, and eight Democratic senators joined them. The failed Senate vote "followed more than a year of lobbying by gay rights organizations, who steered close to $1 million into New York legislative races to boost support for the measure". The New York Times later described the Senate's defeat of the legislation as "humiliating".

In 2010, several senators who had voted against same-sex marriage in 2009 were defeated. They were: Democrat Darrel Aubertine (defeated by a Republican), Democrats Hiram Monserrate and Bill Stachowski (both of whom were defeated in Democratic primaries by opponents who supported same-sex marriage) and Republican Frank Padavan. Also in 2010, three senators who had voted in favor of same-sex marriage in 2009 were defeated (although the marriage issue was not a prominent one in their 2010 re-election campaigns). They were Democrats Brian Foley, Craig M. Johnson, and Antoine Thompson.

== Activism and civil disobedience campaign ==
After the effort to pass marriage equality legislation failed in New York in 2009, LGBTQ activists escalated the fight for same-sex marriage almost immediately in 2010. Activists formed a direct action group named Queer Rising and staged a protest outside the New York City marriage bureau. Those activists then increased the number of direct action protests and succeeded in putting the issue of marriage equality on the social and legislative agenda for over a year. Queer Rising inspired the creation or actions of other LGBTQ or civil rights groups that, likewise, put pressure on the Government to enact marriage equality. When it was revealed that the Catholic Church was lobbying against passage of marriage equality, activists protested outside St. Patrick's Cathedral in Manhattan in support of same-sex marriage.

== Passage ==
Public rally in front of the Stonewall Inn minutes after the passage of the Marriage Equality Act.

Governor Andrew Cuomo, who took office on December 31, 2010, supported same-sex marriage, as did New York City Mayor Michael Bloomberg. Cuomo called a March 2011 meeting with same-sex marriage advocates to strategize about the legislation, and he played a major role in pushing for it. Other supporters included the Empire State Pride Agenda, the Human Rights Campaign, Equality Matters, Freedom to Marry, and New Yorkers United for Marriage. Opponents included Archbishop Timothy Dolan of the Roman Catholic Archdiocese of New York, the National Organization for Marriage, Democratic State Sen. Rubén Díaz Sr. of the Bronx, the Empire Missionary Baptist Convention, Orthodox Jewish leaders, New Yorkers for Constitutional Freedoms, and the Coalition to Save Marriage in New York. Also, in May 2011, the Conservative Party of New York State stated that it would withdraw support from any candidate who supported same-sex marriage.

On June 13, 2011, three Democratic senators who had voted against the December 2009 same-sex marriage bill (Shirley Huntley, Carl Kruger and Joseph Addabbo Jr.) announced their support for the Marriage Equality Act. By this point in time, every Democratic state senator except one supported the bill. James Alesi became the first Republican senator to announce his support for the bill, and Roy McDonald became the second on June 14; at this point, only one more supporter was needed for the bill to pass the Senate. Democratic Senator Rubén Díaz Sr., a vocal opponent of same-sex marriage, resigned from the bicameral Black, Puerto Rican, Hispanic, and Asian Legislative Caucus to demonstrate his opposition to its position on the legislation.

The New York State Assembly passed the Marriage Equality Act on June 15, 2011, by a margin of 80 to 63; this was a smaller margin of victory than three same-sex marriage bills had attained in the Assembly in prior years. On the same day, Governor Cuomo issued a message of necessity to the Senate, allowing the bill to bypass the normal three-day aging process.

On June 24, Republican Senate Majority Leader Dean Skelos announced that the Senate would consider the legislation as the final bill of the legislative session. Skelos had previously stated that Republican senators would be free to vote their consciences on the bill if it came to the floor.

The Marriage Equality Act was considered on the Senate floor on June 24. While the Senate met, the Assembly voted on a set of amendments developed to win the support of Senators concerned about the Act's impact on religion-based opposition to same-sex marriage, which detailed exemptions for religious and benevolent organizations. The exemptions are tied to a severability clause, ensuring that if the religious exemptions were successfully challenged in court, the entire legislation would not be ruled invalid. The proposed amendments passed with little debate by a vote of 36–26. The same-sex marriage bill passed later that evening by a vote of 33–29. Governor Andrew Cuomo signed the act into law at 11:55 P.M. Republican senators Mark Grisanti and Stephen Saland joined Sens. Alesi and McDonald as the only Senate Republicans supporting the legislation, while Sen. Ruben Diaz cast the only Senate Democratic vote against the bill.

On June 25, the Gotham Gazette reported that Senate rules had been changed the previous day "in a backroom agreement before session started and then changed again during the vote to make sure it would be concluded to make the 11 p.m. newscasts." The Gazette also reported that Sen. Rubén Díaz Sr., an opponent of same-sex marriage, was ignored when he requested that the bill be laid aside for debate. According to Sen. Kevin Parker, Senate Democrats were informed prior to the vote that each Senator would have two minutes to explain his or her vote; however, legislators were not allowed to speak on the bill. The Gazette further reported that the vote was expedited because of Gov. Cuomo's desire to have the bill's passage covered on that evening's news. Sen. Parker added that the doors to the Senate chamber were locked on the evening of June 24 to prevent senators from leaving the chamber when the bill was voted upon.

The Act took effect on July 24, 2011.

In addition to legalizing same-sex marriage, the Marriage Equality Act also prohibited state and local courts and governments from penalizing religious and religious-supervised institutions, their employees, and their clergy for refusing to sanctify or recognize marriages that contradict their religious doctrines or for declining to provide services and accommodations in connection with such marriages.

The Marriage Equality Act made New York the sixth state in the United States to legalize same-sex marriage (excluding California, which legalized and performed some 18,000 same-sex marriages before a ban on further marriages was promulgated through referendum), and also made the state the most populous in the union to do so.

=== Final Senate roll call ===
Senator	Party	Vote on amendments	Vote on bill
Eric Adams	Democratic	✓ Aye	✓ Aye
Joseph Addabbo Jr.	Democratic	✓ Aye	✓ Aye
James Alesi	Republican	✓ Aye	✓ Aye
Tony Avella	Democratic	✓ Aye	✓ Aye
Greg Ball	Republican	✗ No	✗ No
John Bonacic	Republican	✗ No	✗ No
Neil Breslin	Democratic	✓ Aye	✓ Aye
David Carlucci	Independent Democratic	✓ Aye	✓ Aye
John DeFrancisco	Republican	✗ No	✗ No
Rubén Díaz Sr.	Democratic	✗ No	✗ No
Martin Malave Dilan	Democratic	✓ Aye	✓ Aye
Thomas Duane	Democratic	✓ Aye	✓ Aye
Adriano Espaillat	Democratic	✓ Aye	✓ Aye
Hugh Farley	Republican	✗ No	✗ No
John J. Flanagan	Republican	✗ No	✗ No
Charles Fuschillo	Republican	✗ No	✗ No
Patrick Gallivan	Republican	✗ No	✗ No
Michael N. Gianaris	Democratic	✓ Aye	✓ Aye
Martin Golden	Republican	✗ No	✗ No
Joseph Griffo	Republican	✗ No	✗ No
Mark Grisanti	Republican	✓ Aye	✓ Aye
Kemp Hannon	Republican	✓ Aye	✗ No
Ruth Hassell-Thompson	Democratic	✓ Aye	✓ Aye
Shirley Huntley	Democratic	✓ Aye	✓ Aye
Owen H. Johnson	Republican	✗ No	✗ No
Timothy M. Kennedy	Democratic	✓ Aye	✓ Aye
Jeffrey Klein	Independent Democratic	✓ Aye	✓ Aye
Liz Krueger	Democratic	✓ Aye	✓ Aye
Carl Kruger	Democratic	✓ Aye	✓ Aye
Andrew Lanza	Republican	✗ No	✗ No
Bill Larkin	Republican	✗ No	✗ No
Kenneth LaValle	Republican	✗ No	✗ No
Thomas W. Libous	Republican	✗ No	✗ No
Betty Little	Republican	✗ No	✗ No
Carl Marcellino	Republican	✓ Aye	✗ No
Jack Martins	Republican	✗ No	✗ No
George D. Maziarz	Republican	✗ No	✗ No
Roy McDonald	Republican	✓ Aye	✓ Aye
Velmanette Montgomery	Democratic	✓ Aye	✓ Aye
Michael Nozzolio	Republican	✗ No	✗ No
Tom O'Mara	Republican	✗ No	✗ No
Suzi Oppenheimer	Democratic	✓ Aye	✓ Aye
Kevin Parker	Democratic	✓ Aye	✓ Aye
Jose Peralta	Democratic	✓ Aye	✓ Aye
Bill Perkins	Democratic	✓ Aye	✓ Aye
Michael Ranzenhofer	Republican	✗ No	✗ No
Patty Ritchie	Republican	✗ No	✗ No
Gustavo Rivera	Democratic	✓ Aye	✓ Aye
Joseph Robach	Republican	✗ No	✗ No
Stephen Saland	Republican	✓ Aye	✓ Aye
John Sampson	Democratic	✓ Aye	✓ Aye
Diane Savino	Independent Democratic	✓ Aye	✓ Aye
José M. Serrano	Democratic	✓ Aye	✓ Aye
James Seward	Republican	✗ No	✗ No
Dean Skelos	Republican	✓ Aye	✗ No
Malcolm Smith	Democratic	✓ Aye	✓ Aye
Daniel Squadron	Democratic	✓ Aye	✓ Aye
Toby Ann Stavisky	Democratic	✓ Aye	✓ Aye
Andrea Stewart-Cousins	Democratic	✓ Aye	✓ Aye
David Valesky	Independent Democratic	✓ Aye	✓ Aye
Catharine Young	Republican	✗ No	✗ No
Lee Zeldin	Republican	✗ No	✗ No

== Response ==
=== Organizations ===
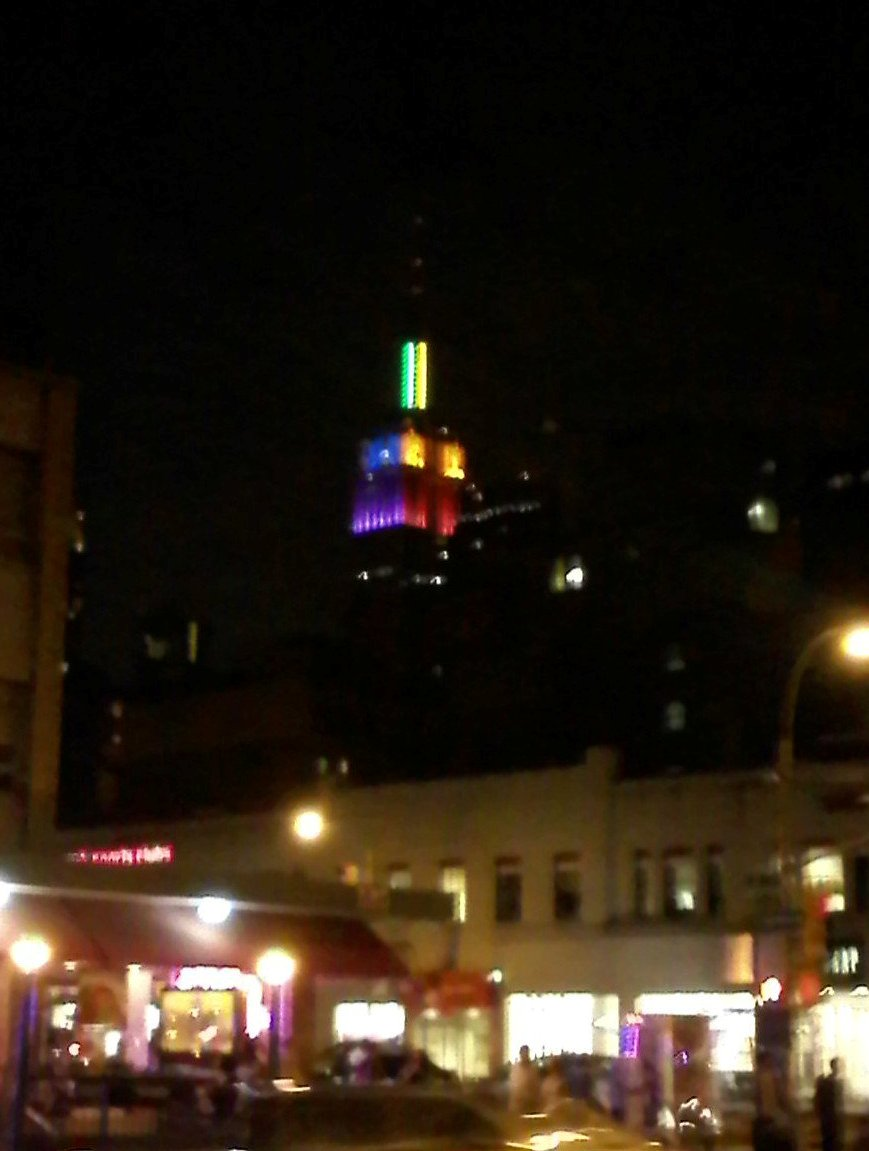
The Empire State Building lit in rainbow colors following the passage of the Marriage Equality Act.

- Freedom to Marry's Evan Wolfson said, "With the freedom to marry in New York, the nationwide majority for marriage will swell, as even more people get to see why marriage matters to same-sex couples, that gay couples, like non-gay, treasure the chance to affirm and strengthen their commitment, and that ending marriage discrimination helps families and hurts no one"
- National Organization for Marriage tweeted, "Marriage loses 33–29 in New York. Sad day for the state and the country. But the fight has just begun."
- The Conservative Party of New York said it would withdraw support for any candidate who voted for the Marriage Equality Act.
- The New York State Catholic Conference, led by Archbishop Timothy Dolan, stated to NBC News that it was "deeply disappointed and troubled" by the bill's passage and added that the Marriage Equality Act would "alter radically and forever humanity's historic understanding of marriage."
- Rev. Jason McGuire of New Yorkers for Constitutional Freedoms commented, "'State legislators should not decide society-shaping issues'". McGuire added that his organization would attempt to defeat legislators who voted in favor of the Marriage Equality Act.

=== Politicians ===
- Governor Andrew Cuomo, who signed the bill into law, said that "New York has finally torn down the barrier that has prevented same-sex couples from exercising the freedom to marry and from receiving the fundamental protections that so many couples and families take for granted." He also said that "With the world watching, the Legislature, by a bipartisan vote, has said that all New Yorkers are equal under the law." Governor Cuomo made a speech calling for all states to legalize same-sex marriage; Cuomo stated that "We need marriage equality in every state in this nation… Otherwise, no state really has marriage equality, and we will not rest until it is a reality." Following the passage of the Marriage Equality Act, Governor Cuomo was criticized for describing the viewpoints of same-sex marriage opponents as being "anti-American."
- Mayor of New York City Michael Bloomberg, whose in-progress news conference was interrupted by City Council Speaker Christine Quinn who announced the passage of the bill, called the passage "a historic triumph for equality and freedom." He also said that he would support the Republicans who voted in favor of the bill in the next legislative election.
- White House spokesperson Shin Inouye told the Washington Blade by e-mail that "The president has long believed that gay and lesbian couples deserve the same rights and legal protections as straight couples." He further stated "That's why he has called for repeal of the so-called 'Defense of Marriage Act' and determined that his administration would no longer defend the constitutionality of DOMA in the courts. The states should determine for themselves how best to uphold the rights of their own citizens. The process in New York worked just as it should." On June 23, incumbent President Barack Obama delivered a speech at the Human Rights Campaign's annual gala in which he did not take an explicit position on marriage equality, but instead iterated that New York was "doing exactly what democracies are supposed to do", insisting that the decision should be left to state governments.
- U.S. junior Senator for New York Kirsten Gillibrand stated that "New York has always led the way for equal rights – from leading the suffrage movement, to Abraham Lincoln's remarkable speech opposing slavery at Cooper Union, and we have done it again."
- Congressmember Jerry Nadler stated that "Now more than ever, we must pass the Respect for Marriage Act, my legislation to repeal the discriminatory DOMA, and allow New Yorkers and others who are - or will be - legally married to take part in the full measure of protections and obligations of federal law. Just last night in New York City, President Obama reiterated his belief that DOMA violates our Constitution and must be repealed."
- Former New York governor and state senator David Paterson praised the vote, saying "Tonight, I am ecstatic, I am elated, and I am proud to be a New Yorker." He also reciprocated accolades offered to him by Cuomo and referred to his own 2008 directive to recognize out-of-state marriages.

=== Town clerks ===
Two town clerks, one in Barker and another in Granby, resigned their positions due to moral and religious objections to signing marriage certificates for same-sex couples. For the same reason, a clerk in Guilderland announced she would continue in her position but would no longer officiate at any weddings, allowing another official to do so in her stead. The town clerk of Volney said she will not sign marriage certificates for same-sex couples unless forced to do so. Kathleen Rice, the district attorney for Nassau County, warned all town clerks within her jurisdiction they could face criminal charges if any refused to perform their duties with respect to same-sex marriages. The town clerk of Ledyard, Rose Marie Belforti, made state and national headlines when she notified town officials that she would not sign gay marriage certificates due to her religious beliefs. Belforti later delegated marriage applications to a deputy. Same-sex marriage advocates and some town residents criticized Belforti for taking this action, and resident Ed Easter attempted to unseat her in the fall of 2011. Belforti was reelected by a substantial margin. Governor Cuomo took the position that municipal employees responsible for solemnizing or licensing marriages were obliged to solemnize or license same-sex marriage licenses as well. "If you can't enforce the law, then you shouldn't be in that position," Cuomo said. New Yorkers for Constitutional Freedoms set up a "Courage Fund" to "assist courageous municipal clerks and other people of conscience in New York State who oppose same-sex 'marriage' from harassment, denial of rightful promotion, or unfair termination for invoking New York State law protecting their sincerely-held religious beliefs".

=== Media personalities ===
- Musician and New York native Lady Gaga, who had personally lobbied senators and had urged fans of her music to call or write their senators, stated on Twitter that "The revolution is ours to fight for love, justice, and equality."
- Wendy Williams posted to Twitter "Yay for Gay Marriage! NY, it's about time... jersey we're next! How you doin?"
- Cyndi Lauper stated that "I have never be[sic] prouder to be a lifelong New Yorker than I am today with the passage of marriage equality. "
- Star Trek actor and California resident George Takei, who, with his husband Brad Altman, owns an apartment in New York City, said that "good waves coming from New York is going to make a profound influence on our situation here." Takei and Altman are among 18,000 same-sex couples who were married in California during the 2008 window period prior to the passage of Proposition 8 by referendum.
- At the 2011 BET Awards, Kerry Washington compared the situation to earlier prohibitions on interracial marriage, saying "we have to be very careful about legislating love in this country. If we say that people of a certain sexual orientation can't be married, we might go back to saying that people of different races can't be married. And we can't afford to do that."

=== Ensuing elections and appointments ===
Four Republican state senators−Sens. James Alesi, Mark Grisanti, Roy McDonald, and Stephen Saland−voted in favor of same-sex marriage in 2011. Following their votes, the four senators received public support from New York City Mayor Michael Bloomberg, who scheduled a fundraiser for the four senators that was expected to raise $1.25 million. Mayor Bloomberg also made maximum contributions to each of their re-election campaigns.

On May 9, 2012, Alesi announced that he would not run for re-election. He stated that many factors, including the welfare of the Republican Party, led to his decision. Prior to Alesi's announcement, Assemblyman Sean Hanna had expressed interest in challenging Alesi in the Republican primary. Alesi indicated that his same-sex marriage vote would have "severely hampered" his chances in a Republican primary.

Grisanti, McDonald, and Saland each faced primary challenges in 2012. Grisanti defeated attorney Kevin Stocker, 59% to 40%, after a campaign in which "much of the bitterest politicking had revolved around Grisanti's controversial 2011 vote to support legalizing same-sex marriage in the state." In the general election, Grisanti defeated three other candidates, including a Conservative Party challenger who opposed same-sex marriage.

In the District 43 Republican primary, McDonald faced Saratoga County Clerk Kathleen Marchione, who criticized McDonald's vote for same-sex marriage. After a primary contest that was described as "divisive", "bitter," and "nasty", Marchione declared victory by a narrow margin on September 25, 2012. McDonald later opted to cease his campaign and support Marchione. Marchione won the general election on November 6, 2012. Following McDonald's loss, a Newsday headline described the senator as "a political casualty of same-sex marriage."

In District 41, Saland received a Republican primary challenge from Neil Di Carlo. Saland won by a margin of 107 votes. Di Carlo continued his campaign as the candidate of the Conservative Party, and Saland lost the general election to Democrat Terry Gipson by a margin of 2,096 votes. Di Carlo acted as a spoiler, receiving 17,300 votes on the Conservative line.

Of the four Republican state senators who voted in favor of the Marriage Equality Act, only one—Mark Grisanti—was re-elected to the State Senate in 2012. Grisanti was defeated in the 2014 elections.

In 2013, Gov. Andrew Cuomo appointed Alesi to a $90,000-per-year post on the Unemployment Insurance Appeal Board.

In 2015, Gov. Cuomo appointed Grisanti to the New York State Court of Claims. Grisanti's appointment was confirmed by the New York State Senate in May 2015. The reported salary for the judgeship was $174,000.

In 2016, Gov. Cuomo appointed Saland to the board of the state Thruway Authority.

In June 2017, Gov. Cuomo nominated Alesi to a $109,800-per-year position on the state's Public Service Commission; the Senate confirmed his appointment.

=== Lawsuits ===
Sen. Rubén Díaz Sr., a Democrat and the most prominent opponent of the Act, announced at a rally on July 24, 2011 that he would file a lawsuit alleging that the same-sex marriages performed on that day were illegal. Diaz said the lawsuit would challenge judicial waivers that allowed a same-sex couple to marry on the same day they applied for a marriage license.

On July 25, 2011, New Yorkers for Constitutional Freedoms, along with Liberty Counsel, filed a lawsuit in the New York Supreme Court for Livingston County against the New York Senate and other state offices seeking an injunction against the Act. On November 18, 2011, Acting Supreme Court Justice Robert B. Wiggins allowed the plaintiffs' claims under the Open Meetings Law, but dismissed other portions of the case. He noted: "It is ironic that much of the state's brief passionately spews sanctimonious verbiage on the separation of powers in the governmental branches, and clear arm-twisting by the Executive on the Legislative permeates this entire process." On July 6, 2012, a five-judge panel of the Appellate Division ruled unanimously that no violation of the Open Meetings Law had occurred and dismissed the suit. On August 6, 2012, Liberty Counsel appealed to the New York Court of Appeals, which declined to hear the appeal on October 23.
