= New York City's 30th City Council district =

- Boundaries following the 2020 census

Government
  - Councilmember: Phil Wong (D—Elmhurst)

Population (2010)
  - Total: 154,608

Demographics
  - White: 57%
  - Hispanic: 31%
  - Asian: 8%
  - Black: 2%
  - Other: 2%

Registration
  - Democratic: 51.0%
  - Republican: 18.8%
  - No party preference: 26.1%
- Registered voters (2021) 92,606

New York City's 30th City Council district, in central Queens, is one of 51 districts in the New York City Council. It has been represented by Democrat Phil Wong since 2026, succeeding term-limited fellow Democrat Robert Holden.

== Geography ==
District 30 is based in the predominantly white and Hispanic neighborhoods of central Queens, including Maspeth, Glendale, Middle Village, and parts of Woodhaven, Ridgewood, and Woodside. Forest Park is located within the district, as are a number of the city's cemeteries.

The district overlaps with Queens Community Boards 4, 5, and 6, and with New York's 6th and 7th congressional districts. It also overlaps with the 12th and 15th districts of the New York State Senate, and with the 28th, 30th, 37th, 38th, and 39th districts of the New York State Assembly.

== List of members representing the district ==
Members	Party	Years served	Electoral history
District established January 1, 1974
Thomas J. Cuite (Sunset Park)	Democratic	January 1, 1974 – December 31, 1985	Redistricted from the 20th district and re-elected in 1973. Re-elected in 1974. Re-elected in 1977. Re-elected in 1982. Retired.
Stephen DiBrienza (Windsor Terrace)	Democratic	January 1, 1986 – December 31, 1991	Elected in 1985. Re-elected in 1989. Redistricted to the 39th district.
Tom Ognibene (Middle Village)	Republican	January 1, 1992 – December 31, 2001	Elected in 1991. Re-elected in 1993. Re-elected in 1997. Termed out.
Dennis P. Gallagher (Glendale)	Republican	January 1, 2002 – March 17, 2008	Elected in 2001. Re-elected in 2003. Re-elected in 2005. Resigned.
Vacant		March 17, 2008 – June 18, 2008	
Anthony Como (Ridgewood)	Republican	June 18, 2008 – December 31, 2008	Elected to finish Gallagher's term. Lost re-election.
Elizabeth Crowley (Glendale)	Democratic	January 1, 2009 – December 31, 2017	Elected in 2009. Re-elected in 2013. Lost re-election.
Robert Holden (Middle Village)	Democratic	January 1, 2018 – December 31, 2025	Elected in 2017. Re-elected in 2021. Re-elected in 2023. Termed out.
Phil Wong (Elmhurst)	Democratic	January 1, 2026 – present	Elected in 2025.

== Recent election results ==
=== 2025 ===
The 2025 New York City Council elections will be held on November 4, 2025, with primary elections occurring on June 24, 2025.

2025 New York City Council election, District 30 Democratic primary
Party	Candidate	Maximum round	Maximum votes	Share in maximum round	Maximum votes First round votes Transfer votes
Democratic	Phil Wong	3	5,549	51.5%	
Democratic	Paul Pogozelski	3	5,233	48.5%	
Democratic	Dermot Smyth	2	3,963	31.2%	
Write-in		1	168	1.3%	

2025 New York City Council election, District 30 general election
Party	Candidate	Votes	%
Democratic	Phil Wong	20,501	54.2
Republican	Alicia Vaichunas	15,029	
Conservative	Alicia Vaichunas	1,465	
Total	Alicia Vaichunas	16,494	43.6
Write-in		842	2.2
Total votes		37,837	100.0
Democratic hold			

=== 2023 (redistricting) ===
Due to redistricting and the 2020 changes to the New York City Charter, councilmembers elected during the 2021 and 2023 City Council elections will serve two-year terms, with full four-year terms resuming after the 2025 New York City Council elections.

2023 New York City Council election, District 30
Party	Candidate	Votes	%
Democratic	Robert Holden	3,915	
Republican	Robert Holden	3,435	
Conservative	Robert Holden	453	
Total	Robert Holden (incumbent)	7,803	96.2
Write-in		309	3.8
Total votes		8,112	100.0
Democratic hold			

=== 2021 ===
An interactive map of District 30

In 2019, voters in New York City approved Ballot Question 1, which implemented ranked-choice voting in all local elections. Under the new system, voters have the option to rank up to five candidates for every local office. Voters whose first-choice candidates fare poorly will have their votes redistributed to other candidates in their ranking until one candidate surpasses the 50 percent threshold. If one candidate surpasses 50 percent in first-choice votes, then ranked-choice tabulations will not occur.

2021 New York City Council election, District 30
Primary election
Party	Candidate	Votes	%
Democratic	Robert Holden (incumbent)	5,250	54.6
Democratic	Juan Ardila	4,324	45.0
Write-in		38	0.4
Total votes		9,612	100
General election
Republican	Robert Holden	10,555	52.4
Democratic	Robert Holden	7,991	39.7
Conservative	Robert Holden	1,167	5.8
Total	Robert Holden (incumbent)	19,713	97.9
Write-in		440	2.1
Total votes		20,153	100
Democratic gain from Republican			

=== 2017 ===
2017 New York City Council election, District 30
Primary election
Party	Candidate	Votes	%
Democratic	Elizabeth Crowley (incumbent)	3,621	63.7
Democratic	Robert Holden	2,050	36.0
Write-in		16	0.3
Total votes		5,687	100
General election
Republican	Robert Holden	8,720	
Conservative	Robert Holden	1,507	
Reform	Robert Holden	189	
Dump De Blasio	Robert Holden	147	
Total	Robert Holden	10,563	50.3
Democratic	Elizabeth Crowley	9,351	
Working Families	Elizabeth Crowley	911	
Women's Equality	Elizabeth Crowley	184	
Total	Elizabeth Crowley (incumbent)	10,426	49.6
Write-in		16	0.1
Total votes		21,023	100
Republican gain from Democratic			

=== 2013 ===
2013 New York City Council election, District 30
Party	Candidate	Votes	%
Democratic	Elizabeth Crowley	9,050	
Working Families	Elizabeth Crowley	840	
Total	Elizabeth Crowley (incumbent)	9,890	58.9
Republican	Craig Caruana	5,810	
Conservative	Craig Caruana	1,063	
Total	Craig Caruana	6,873	41.0
Write-in		18	0.1
Total votes		16,781	100
Democratic hold			
