= Anthony Como =

American politician

Member of the New York City Council from the 30th district
- In office June 18, 2008 – December 31, 2008
- Preceded by: Dennis P. Gallagher
- Succeeded by: Elizabeth Crowley

Personal details
- Born: April 12, 1974 (age 52) Wyckoff Heights, New York, U.S.
- Party: Republican
- Education: Queens College, Hofstra University
- Profession: Politician

Anthony Como (born April 12, 1974) is a Republican politician from New York City Borough of Queens, New York. He was elected to the 30th district of the New York City Council in 2008 as a Republican, defeating Democrat Elizabeth Crowley, in what had been a reliably Republican district. The district includes Middle Village, Glendale, Ridgewood and parts of Richmond Hill, Woodhaven and Forest Hills.

Crowley ran against Como again in the 2008 special election and beat him.

== Education and background ==
Anthony Como was born on April 22, 1974, in Wyckoff Heights Medical Center, in the Wyckoff Heights neighborhood of Brooklyn, New York. Within a few months of his birth, his family moved to Ridgewood, Queens. He attended Our Lady of the Miraculous Medal School, where he graduated in 1988, and attended Christ the King Regional High School. Como attended Queens College where he received his Bachelor of Arts degree. Como then attended Hofstra University School of Law where he received his J.D. degree and was admitted to the New York State Bar Association in October 2001.

== Career ==
Running to fill a vacancy, Como first won election in a special election in 2008.

In September 2008, he was named one of City Hall's "40 under 40" for being a young influential member of New York City politics.

Como was an Assistant District Attorney under Queens District Attorney Richard Brown, a Commissioner of the New York State Board of Elections and served as Legal Counsel for former New York State Senator Serphin R. Maltese prior to his election to the New York City Council.

== Affiliations ==
Como has been affiliated with many civic and community organizations. He was a member of the board of directors of the Peter Cardella Senior Center, Italian Charities of America and the Italian American Federal Credit Union, he also served on the Executive Committee of the Queens County Republican Party and was also a member of the Middle Village Republican Club, Rego, Middle Village Property Owners, Glendale Civic Association, UNICO Organization of Queens County, Order Sons of Italy in America, Mario Lanza Lodge in Middle Village Queens Inc, Glendale Kiwanis and Congress of Italian-Americans Organization, Inc.

Political offices
Preceded by Dennis P. Gallagher	New York City Council, 30th district 2008	Succeeded by Elizabeth Crowley
Party political offices
Preceded by Michael D. Weiss	Republican nominee for New York State Assembly, 28th district 2005	Succeeded by Dolores Maddis
Preceded by Serphin R. Maltese	Conservative Party of New York nominee for New York State Senate, 15th district 2010	Succeeded by Most Recent
Preceded by Serphin R. Maltese	Republican nominee for New York State Senate, 15th district 2010	Succeeded by Most Recent
