= Nessa Carey =

British molecular biologist

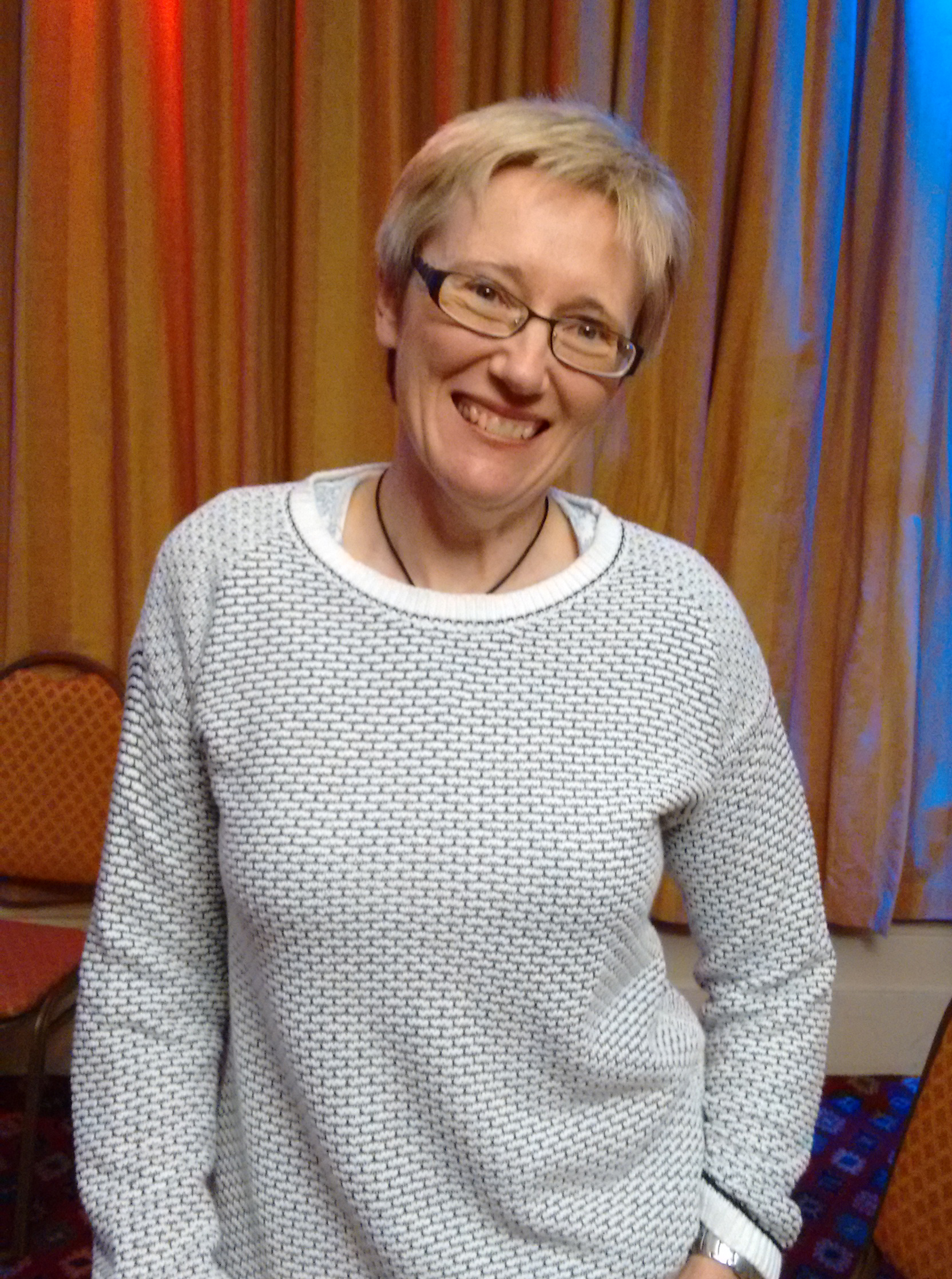
- Nessa Carey at Eastbourne Sceptics in the Pub in February 2015 after her Epigenetics talk.
- Education: University of Edinburgh
- Known for: The Epigenetics Revolution; Junk DNA: A Journey Through the Dark Matter of the Genome
- Scientific career
- Fields: Epigenetics, Technology Transfer
- Workplaces: Imperial College London
- Thesis: Studies on the extracellular envelope glycoprotein of maedi-visna virus.
- Website: http://www.nessacarey.co.uk/

Nessa Carey is a British biologist working in the field of molecular biology and biotechnology. She is International Director of the technology transfer organization PraxisUnico and a visiting professor at Imperial College London.

With expertise in the field of epigenetics and in technology transfer, she promotes the movement of scientists between academia and industry, lecturing often to students and early career scientists. Carey writes books and articles for a scientifically interested general audience. She is the author of The Epigenetics Revolution and Junk DNA: A Journey Through the Dark Matter of the Genome which explore advances in the field of epigenetics and their implications for medicine. She edited Epigenetics for Drug Discovery for the Royal Society of Chemistry's Drug Discovery Series.

== Education and career ==
Carey attended state schools. She first attended the University of Edinburgh to study veterinary medicine. Having limited aptitude for the course and reacting badly to animal fur she left veterinary studies.

"This didn't last because I was allergic to fur, unable to think in 3D (not good for anatomy), quite bored and really rubbish at the course."

— Nessa Carey

She then worked for five years in the Metropolitan Police forensic science laboratory as a forensic scientist. After studying for her degree in immunology part-time, Carey decided to continue academic research and returned to the University of Edinburgh to pursue doctoral studies. Carey was awarded her Doctorate (PhD) by research thesis on the virology of the maedi-visna virus which affects sheep, in 1993.

Her post-doctoral research was in the field of human genetics at the Department of Anatomy, Charing Cross and Westminster Medical School after which she became a lecturer, and then senior lecturer, in molecular biology at Imperial College London, School of Medicine. In 2001 she left academia to work in industry although since 2013 she has been a visiting professor in the Department of Surgery and Cancer at Imperial College London in conjunction with her professional career.

Carey was director of molecular biology at Vernalis from 2001 until 2004. She then held positions as Head of Biology at TopoTarget from 2004 to 2006 and Scientific Director at CellCentric from 2006 to May 2011. From May 2011 until July 2014 she was Senior Director in External Research and Development Innovation at Pfizer where she focused on identifying new collaborative opportunities in the field of epigenetics. She has been International Director at PraxisUnico since July 2014.

Carey was a Member of the Bioscience for Industry Strategy Advisory Panel of the Biotechnology and Biological Sciences Research Council (BBSRC) from 2011 to 2015; a Member of the Molecular and Cellular Medicine Board of the Medical Research Council (MRC) from 2011 to 2015 and a Scientific Steering Committee member for the MRC Epigenetics workshop in 2015.

Dr Casey delivered the COURTAULD LECTURE entitled "Epigenetics: Why You Don’t Have Teeth in your Eyeballs" to Manchester Literary & Philosophical Society where notes of it may be viewed

Carey's expertise has expanded from biology to include communication and training. She is a Registered Technology Transfer Professional (RTTP). Her achievements include delivering training at Imperial College School of Medicine and the Royal College of Surgeons (UK and Ireland). She is active in promoting movement of scientists between academia and industry and often discusses choices with early career scientists.

When opportunity comes knocking, it's best not to be in the shower ... I think of myself of someone who has had a lot of careers in science, rather than one scientific career.

— Nessa Carey

== Publications ==
Carey's books and lectures explain developments in epigenetics to a scientifically interested general audience. Carey has published over 30 peer-reviewed papers on epigenetics and other aspects of biology. She also writes in the popular press examining popular culture and media from a scientific viewpoint.

=== The Epigenetics Revolution: How Modern Biology Is Rewriting Our Understanding of Genetics, Disease, and Inheritance ===
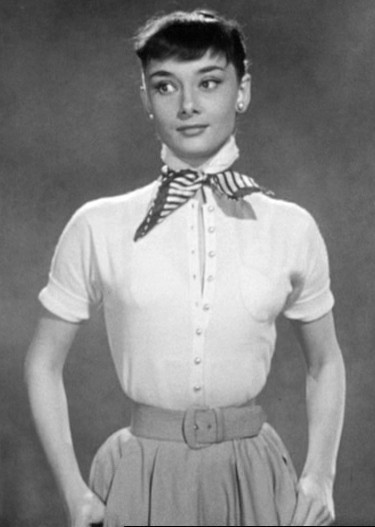
Carey suggests that Audrey Hepburn's slight figure may be the product of epigenetic changes from wartime deprivation.

Her first book, The Epigenetics Revolution, describes how epigenetic modifications allow the same DNA to express different characteristics; she likens DNA to a script for a play rather than a template. The same script can produce different productions of the play.

She used the example of Audrey Hepburn's slight figure to explain the possible impacts of epigenetics. Hepburn's figure was a result of lifelong illnesses brought on by her deprivation during the Dutch famine of 1944–45 during World War II. Carey's book says we aren't simply born with pre-set genes and the way genes function can be altered 'epigenetically' by our environments or diets. These changes can subsequently impact future generations. The book discusses controversies which are a part of this rapidly developing field and explores explanations other than epigenetics for some findings.

Peter Forbes of The Guardian wrote that while the book does not simplify scientific terminology for the general reader, it "is the first to set out the epigenetics stall for the general reader, and anyone seriously interested in who we are and how we function should read this book". Other reviewers also found the book "a bit jargon heavy", while some felt this was "not so much her fault as the nature of biology". Alexander Badyaev writes that "you cannot help but admire the author who is so fluent in such a great diversity of topics".

=== Junk DNA: A Journey Through the Dark Matter of the Genome ===
Carey's second book, Junk DNA: A Journey Through the Dark Matter of the Genome, examines developments in the study of junk DNA, or noncoding DNA. DNA that doesn't code for proteins has been dismissed as nonfunctional until recently. She explains the "most fundamental reason for the shift in emphasis is the sheer volume of junk DNA that our cells contain. One of the biggest shocks when the human genome sequence was completed in 2001 was the discovery that over 98 per cent of the DNA in a human is junk. It doesn't code for any proteins." Carey describes how this Junk DNA

maintains the integrity of our chromosomes; regulates the ways the protein-coding genes are expressed; influences how we age and generally introduces incredible degrees of subtlety and flexibility into how we use the relatively small numbers of genes that code for proteins ... [and] contributes to all sorts of situations, from the correct control of gene expression in female cells to the regulation of pathways that drive cancer. From Ernest Hemingway's mutant cat to exoneration of the innocent through DNA fingerprinting, junk DNA impacts on an astonishing range of biological phenomena.

The book uses analogy to explain molecular phenomena. Although there is some criticism that the book's coverage is "too comprehensive for the general reader" and "lacks an overarching, compelling narrative to carry readers through", reviewer Linda Geddes called it "a cutting-edge, exhaustive guide to the rapidly changing, ever-more mysterious genome." It is recommended for "any nonspecialist who would like a captivating, thorough, and up-to-date introduction...[to] the bigger picture of our wonderful and messy genome."

Carey describes the controversy and politics around this field: "At one extreme we have scientists claiming experimental proof is lacking to support sometimes sweeping claims. At the other are those who feel there is a whole generation of scientists (if not more) trapped in an outdated model and unable to see or understand the new order." While some reviewers have criticised her style, a few also attack her science.

=== Epigenetics for Drug Discovery ===
Edited by Carey, Epigenetics for Drug Discovery, is "written by the leading researchers in this field. It is intended as a guide for medicinal chemists or scientists in other fields wishing to know more." This book examines the field of epigenetics, its possible applications to medicine and the challenges in using the research safely and efficaciously. It includes for example: a chapter by Karl P. Nightingale which defines epigenetics and explains why it matters; a chapter by Tom D. Heightman and Michael McCullar which focuses "on the biochemical mechanisms controlling DNA methylation, consequences of aberrant DNA methylation in complex chronic diseases, existing modulators of DNA methylation used in the clinic, and opportunities for new drugs targeting this central epigenetic mechanism" and a chapter titled "Progress in Targeting Epigenetic Readers" by Chun-Wa Chung.

This book is part of the Royal Society of Chemistry's Drug Discovery Series which includes over fifty volumes published since 2010 in the fields of drug discovery and medicinal chemistry. "Providing comprehensive coverage of this important and far-reaching area, the books encourage learning in a range of different topics and provide valuable reference for scientists working outside their own areas of expertise."

=== Hacking the Code of Life: How Gene Editing Will Rewrite Our Futures (2019) ===
This book discusses a new technique for genetic modification called CRISPR. This system allows the scientists to precisely and easily manipulate the genes of any living organism in a short period of time. The book further discusses the ethical limitations in the implementation of these methods on human beings. Carey gives a snapshot of the technology that is possibly going to change the future of gene editing.
