= Kristen Gonzalez =

American politician

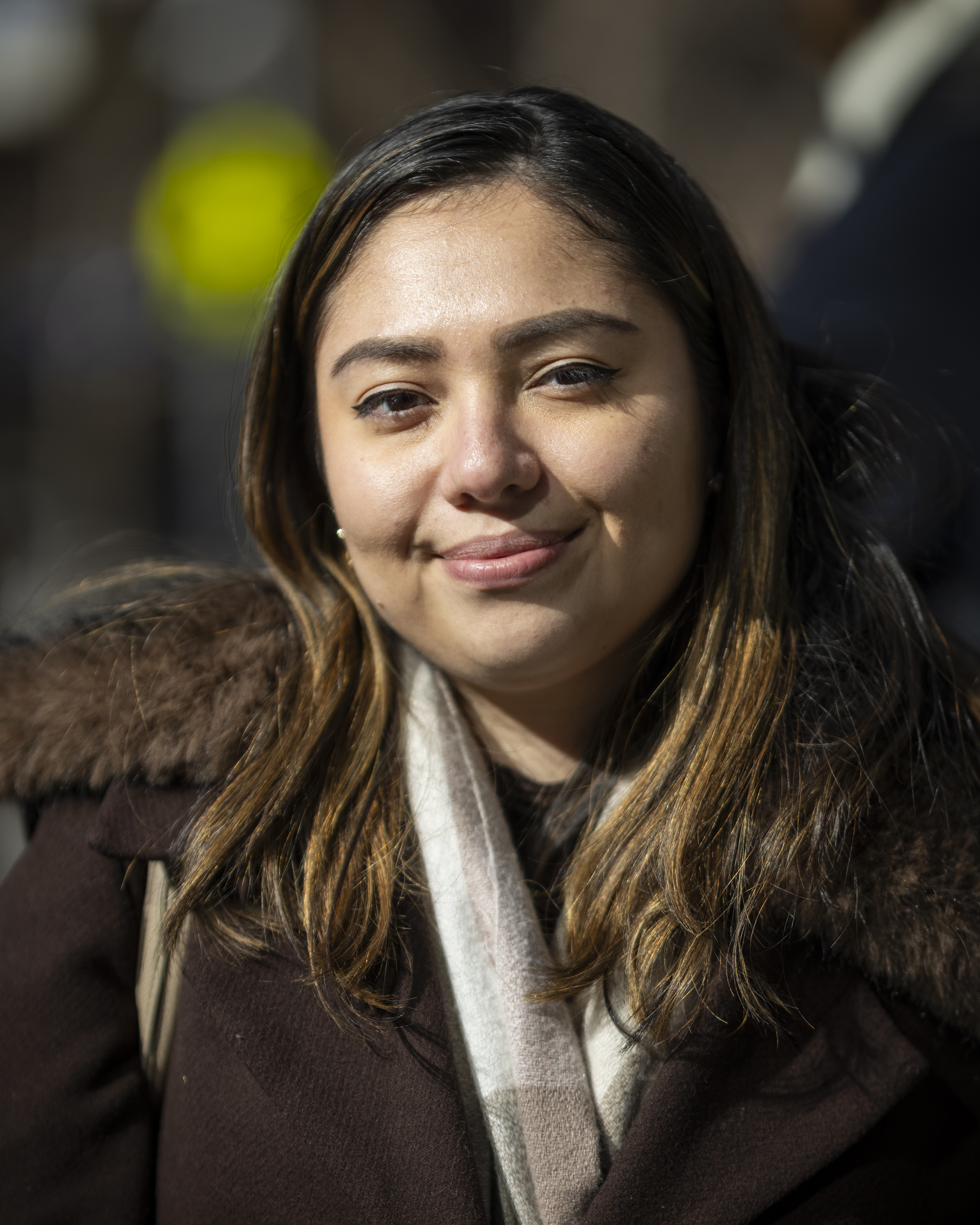
- Gonzalez in 2026

Member of the New York State Senate from the 59th district
- Incumbent
- Assumed office January 1, 2023
- Preceded by: Open seat (redistricting)

Personal details
- Born: August 1, 1995 (age 31) Elmhurst, New York, U.S.
- Party: Democratic
- Other political affiliations: Democratic Socialists of America
- Education: Columbia University (BA)
- Website: State Senate website

Kristen Serene Gonzalez (born August 1, 1995) is an American politician serving as a member of the New York State Senate representing the 59th district, which contains parts of Queens, Manhattan, and Brooklyn.

== Early life and education ==
Gonzalez was born in Elmhurst, Queens, to a Puerto Rican mother and a Colombian father. She attended the Dalton School, a prep school on the Upper East Side. Gonzalez then attended Columbia University and majored in political science and ethnicity and race studies.

== New York State Senate (2023–present) ==
=== 2022 election ===
Gonzalez announced her candidacy for New York's 17th Senate District in the 2022 general election on February 2, 2022. Due to subsequent redistricting, Gonzalez changed her candidacy to the 59th Senate District. Gonzalez's main opponent in the Democratic primary was former New York City Council member Elizabeth Crowley, cousin of former Congressman Joe Crowley. Crowley outspent Gonzalez four to one during the campaign. Nomiki Konst also ran for the seat before withdrawing her candidacy and endorsing Gonzalez. On August 24, 2022, Gonzalez beat Crowley by more than 25 percentage points. She represents portions of Brooklyn, Manhattan, and Queens — including the neighborhoods of Astoria, Greenpoint, Williamsburg, Stuyvesant Town, and Long Island City. Gonzalez is a member of the New York City Democratic Socialists of America and of the New York State Socialists in Office.

== Electoral history ==
New York State Senate, 59th district, 2022
Party	Candidate	Votes	%
Democratic primary
Democratic	Kristen Gonzalez	13,115	58.14%
Democratic	Elizabeth Crowley	7,333	32.51%
Democratic	Michael D. Corbett	1,461	6.48%
Democratic	Nomiki Konst (withdrawn)	351	1.55%
Democratic	Francoise Olivas (withdrawn)	252	1.12%
Write-in		46	0.20%
Total votes		22,558	100.00%
General election
Democratic	Kristen Gonzalez	56,339	
Working Families	Kristen Gonzalez	12,711	
Total	Kristen Gonzalez	69,050	98.9%
Write-in		766	1.1%
Total votes		69,816	100.00%
Democratic win (new seat)			
