= Scaffold Law (New York) =

New York state law

New York State Legislature
- Territorial extent: New York (state)
- Enacted by: New York State Legislature
- Enacted: 1885
- Status: In force

The Scaffold Law is a New York State law that holds employers and property owners fully liable when an employee becomes injured due to a gravity-related fall while working at high elevations without proper safety equipment. The law was enacted in 19th century and is contained in New York State Labor Law § 240/241. Critics and politicians have blamed the law for driving up public construction costs in New York State. New York State is the only state that imposes an absolute liability penalty in gravity-related injury cases (Illinois repealed their similar law in 1995).

== History ==
The Scaffold Law was enacted by the New York State Legislature in 1885. The law was enacted at a time in the nation's history when the federal government had not yet enacted widespread worker protection such as the Occupational Safety and Health Administration or workers compensation programs.

In 1995, the state of Illinois repealed its absolute liability standard law for gravity related injuries, leaving New York as the last and only state with such a statute.

There was a lobbying effort in 2013 on behalf of contractors and minority and women owned business enterprises to replace the absolute liability standard with a comparative standard, which would require a jury or arbitrator to determine the amount of negligence cause by an employee.

In 2018, United States Congressman John Faso introduced a federal bill that passed the U.S. Senate but seemingly did not pass in the U.S. House of Representatives in February 2018 that would have denied funding to construction projects that impose an absolute liability standard for gravity-related falls.

== Controversy ==
Critics have cited the law for increasing public construction costs, increasing insurance costs, and creating barriers to entry for Minority and Women-Owned Business Enterprises. The Rockefeller Institute of Government has blamed the law for costing taxpayers $785 million a year. Habitat for Humanity blamed the law for creating obstacles in rebuilding attempts after Hurricane Sandy. Congressman Faso has blamed the law for adding $200 million to the cost of the new Tappan Zee Bridge. Two state congress members also noted that the law is the last and only absolute liability law in the country for gravity-related construction falls.
