= PraxisUnico =

UK based association for KEC practitioners

Knowledge Exchange UK (formerly known as PraxisAuril) is a United Kingdom-based professional association representing practitioners in knowledge transfer and commercialization. As of 2022, it comprises over 4,000 members from more than 180 organizations, primarily universities and public sector research institutions, with a core focus on intellectual property commercialization.

== Members ==
The association includes over 170 member organizations from higher education institutions (HEIs) and public sector research establishments (PSREs) and connects over 5,000 individuals involved in knowledge exchange and collaboration.

== History ==
Praxis Courses Ltd was founded in 2002 by Lita Nelesen. In 2009, PraxisUnico was formed through the merging of Unico. In 2017, PraxisUnico merged with AURIL to form PraxisAuril. In 2024, it merged again to Knowledge Exchange UK.

=== Current and past chairs ===
Chairs of Knowledge Exchange UK have included:

- Iain Thomas, University of Cambridge: 2021–present
- Sean Fielding, University of Exeter: 2019–2021
- Angela Kukula, ICR: 2015–2019
- Sue O’Hare, City University London: 2013–2015
- Douglas Robertson, University of Edinburgh: 2011–2013
- David Secher, University of Cambridge: 2009–2011

== Activities ==
Knowledge Exchange UK (KEUK), formerly known as PraxisAuril, is the professional association for Knowledge Exchange (KE) practitioners in the United Kingdom. KEUK supports professionals working in universities, as well as private and public sector research organizations, by providing training courses, professional development, and networking opportunities both within the UK and internationally.

The association also organizes events and facilitates engagement between researchers and external partners to drive innovation and deliver social and economic benefits. KEUK represents the knowledge exchange and commercialization (KEC) sector in policy consultations. International activities are led by Nessa Carey.

=== Founding member of ATTP ===
It is a founding member of the Alliance of Technology Transfer Professionals (ATTP). The ATTP is a not-for-profit body that confers the Registered Technology Transfer Professional (RTTP) designation, which recognizes the accomplishments, skills, knowledge, and expertise of technology transfer professionals. There are over 320 RTTPs recognized globally.

=== Impact Awards for KEC professionals ===
The Impact Awards were introduced by PraxisUnico in 2009. In 2015, PraxisUnico partnered with Research Councils UK to deliver the awards jointly. The awards are open to members and non-members. The 2015 categories and winners included:

- Contribution to Business: University of Leicester, ASDEC
- Contribution to Society: Public Health England, Ebola on the Frontline
- Outstanding KEC Initiative: Centre for Global Eco-Innovation, Lancaster University, Liverpool University and Inventya

The University of Leicester won the overall award in 2015 for the ASDEC project. Current and previous winners are available on the Impact Awards website. In 2016, instead of holding the Impact Awards, a showcase of past winners took place at the PraxisUnico Conference.

=== Consultations ===
Knowledge Exchange UK has represented the KEC and Technology Transfer sector in numerous government consultations.
