= New York's 60th State Senate district =

American legislative district

Senator
Patrick M. Gallivan; R–Elma
- Registration: 35.0% Republican; 33.0% Democratic; 24.3% No party preference
- Demographics: 82% White; 6% Black; 6% Hispanic; 3% Asian; 1% Native American
- Population (2017): 294,966
- Registered voters: 205,940
- Notes: Conservative party members at 3.6%, Working Families at 0.6%, and "Other" listed as 3.5%

New York's 60th State Senate district is one of 63 districts in the New York State Senate. It has been represented by Republican Patrick M. Gallivan since 2023.

== Geography ==
District 60 is located entirely within Erie County in Western New York.

The district overlaps with New York's 23rd and 26th congressional districts, and with the 142nd, 143rd, 144th, 147th, 149th, and 150th districts of the New York State Assembly.

== Recent election results ==
=== 2026 ===
2026 New York State Senate election, District 60
Party	Candidate	Votes	%
Republican	Patrick Gallivan		
Conservative	Patrick Gallivan		
Total	Patrick Gallivan (incumbent)		
Democratic	Jacqueline Balikowski		
Write-in			
Total votes			

=== 2024 ===
2024 New York State Senate election, District 60
Party	Candidate	Votes	%
Republican	Patrick Gallivan	109,393	
Conservative	Patrick Gallivan	27,499	
Total	Patrick Gallivan (incumbent)	136,892	99.0
Write-in		1,424	1.0
Total votes		138,316	100.0
Republican hold			

=== 2022 ===
2022 New York State Senate election, District 60
Party	Candidate	Votes	%
Republican	Patrick Gallivan	84,009	
Conservative	Patrick Gallivan	26,755	
Total	Patrick Gallivan	110,764	98.7
Write-in		1,446	1.3
Total votes		112,210	100.0
Republican win (new boundaries)			

=== 2020 ===
2020 New York State Senate election, District 60
Party	Candidate	Votes	%
Democratic	Sean Ryan	79,396	
Working Families	Sean Ryan	9,182	
Independence	Sean Ryan	2,452	
Total	Sean Ryan	91,030	60.7
Republican	Joshua Mertzlufft	49,649	
Conservative	Joshua Mertzlufft	9,174	
Total	Joshua Mertzlufft	58,823	39.2
Write-in		124	0.1
Total votes		149,977	100.0
Democratic gain from Republican			

=== 2018 ===
2018 New York State Senate election, District 60
Party	Candidate	Votes	%
Republican	Chris Jacobs	48,603	
Conservative	Chris Jacobs	9,490	
Independence	Chris Jacobs	3,027	
Reform	Chris Jacobs	527	
Total	Chris Jacobs (incumbent)	61,687	55.8
Democratic	Carima El Behairy	45,106	
Working Families	Carima El Behairy	2,537	
Women's Equality	Carima El Behairy	1,300	
Total	Carima El Behairy	48,943	44.2
Write-in		0	0.0
Total votes		110,630	100.0
Republican hold			

=== 2016 ===
2016 New York State Senate election, District 60
Primary election
Party	Candidate	Votes	%
Democratic	Amber Small	7,348	66.4
Democratic	Alfred Coppola	3,712	33.6
Write-in		0	0.0
Total votes		11,060	100.0
Republican	Chris Jacobs	4,902	75.6
Republican	Kevin Stocker	1,586	24.4
Write-in		0	0.0
Total votes		6,488	100.0
General election
Republican	Chris Jacobs	60,510	
Conservative	Chris Jacobs	11,651	
Independence	Chris Jacobs	4,508	
Reform	Chris Jacobs	658	
Total	Chris Jacobs	77,327	58.9
Democratic	Amber Small	46,039	
Working Families	Amber Small	3,799	
Women's Equality	Amber Small	1,198	
Total	Amber Small	51,036	38.9
Green	James DePasquale	2,835	2.2
Write-in		0	0.0
Total votes		131,198	100.0
Republican gain from Democratic			

=== 2014 ===
2014 New York State Senate election, District 60
Primary election
Party	Candidate	Votes	%
Democratic	Marc Panepinto	7,448	51.3
Democratic	Alfred Coppola	7,059	48.7
Write-in		0	0.0
Total votes		14,507	100.0
Republican	Kevin Stocker	5,292	56.6
Republican	Mark Grisanti (incumbent)	4,051	43.4
Write-in		0	0.0
Total votes		9,343	100.0
Working Families	Marc Panepinto	97	91.5
Working Families	Kevin Stocker	7	6.6
Working Families	Alfred Coppola	2	1.9
Write-in		0	0.0
Total votes		106	100.0
General election
Democratic	Marc Panepinto	22,419	
Working Families	Marc Panepinto	3,996	
Total	Marc Panepinto	26,415	32.6
Republican	Kevin Stocker	24,966	30.9
Independence	Mark Grisanti (incumbent)	22,734	28.1
Conservative	Timothy Gallagher	6,796	8.4
Write-in		0	0.0
Total votes		80,911	100.0
Democratic gain from Republican			

=== 2012 ===
2012 New York State Senate election, District 60
Primary election
Party	Candidate	Votes	%
Democratic	Michael Amodeo	7,299	55.4
Democratic	Charles Swanick	3,709	28.1
Democratic	Alfred Coppola	2,174	16.5
Write-in		0	0.0
Total votes		13,182	100.0
Republican	Mark Grisanti (incumbent)	5,806	59.6
Republican	Kevin Stocker	3,930	40.4
Write-in		0	0.0
Total votes		9,736	100.0
Independence	Mark Grisanti (incumbent)	505	68.2
Independence	Marie Clark	161	21.7
Independence	Brian Siklinski	75	10.1
Write-in		0	0.0
Total votes		741	100.0
Working Families	Gregory Davis	139	95.9
Working Families	Mark Grisanti (incumbent, write-in)	4	2.8
Working Families	Michael Amodeo (write-in)	2	1.3
Write-in		0	0.0
Total votes		145	100.0
General election
Republican	Mark Grisanti	56,774	
Independence	Mark Grisanti	6,909	
Total	Mark Grisanti (incumbent)	63,683	50.2
Democratic	Michael Amodeo	45,140	35.6
Conservative	Charles Swanick	15,027	11.8
Working Families	Gregory Davis	3,078	2.4
Write-in		0	0.0
Total votes		126,928	100.0
Republican hold			

=== Federal results in District 60 ===
Year	Office	Results
2020	President	Biden 56.5 – 41.5%
2016	President	Clinton 49.8 – 45.3%
2012	President	Obama 56.1 – 42.0%
2012	Senate	Gillibrand 67.7 – 30.6%
