= List of Canisius University people =

This is a list of notable students, alumni, staff and faculty of Canisius University in Buffalo, New York.

== Academia ==
- Sister Marion Beiter '44 – mathematician, chairman of Mathematics for Rosary Hill College
- H. James Birx – professor of Anthropology, Canisius University
- Paul G. Bulger – president of Buffalo State College
- James Demske, S.J., B.A. '47 – president of Canisius College (1966–1993)

== Business ==
- Michael Buczkowski '86 – general manager / vice president of the Buffalo Bisons
- George Mathewson '72 – chairman of the board, Royal Bank of Scotland
- John W. Rowe '66 – chairman and CEO, Aetna, Inc.; member of the Academy of Science

== Journalism ==
- Anne Burrell '91 – Food Network chef
- Elizabeth MacDonald '84 – Gerald Loeb Award-winning financial journalist with The Wall Street Journal, anchorwoman on many programs and networks
- Michael Scheuer '74 – CBS News terrorism analyst; former CIA employee
- Elaine Sciolino ’70 – author; Paris Bureau Chief for The New York Times
- Adam Zyglis '04 – editorial cartoonist for The Buffalo News, winner of 2015 Pulitzer Prize for Editorial Cartooning

== Medicine and science ==
- Sister Marion Beiter '44 – mathematician, Chairman of Mathematics for Rosary Hill College

== Politics, government, and law ==
- Hon. Dennis Thomas Flynn – delegate to Congress from the Oklahoma Territory
- Hon. John J. LaFalce '61 – former congressman (NY); Peter Canisius Distinguished University professor, Canisius College
- Hon. Michael Liebel Jr. (Class of 1887) – former mayor of Erie, Pennsylvania and United States representative for Pennsylvania
- Hon. Salvatore R. Martoche JSC '62 – New York State Supreme Court justice; former assistant secretary of the Treasury
- Hon. Anthony M. Masiello '69 – former mayor of Buffalo, New York
- James T. Molloy '58 – former doorkeeper, U.S. House of Representatives
- Hon. Henry J. Nowak '57 – former congressman (NY), U.S. House of Representatives
- Denise O'Donnell – former United States attorney, candidate for New York State attorney general and New York State director of Criminal Justice Services
- Hon. L. William Paxon '77 – former congressman (NY); senior advisor, Akin, Gump, Hauer, Strauss & Feld
- Edwin J. Roland – commandant of the United States Coast Guard
- Michael Scheuer '74, Ph.D. – former chief of the Bin Laden Issue Station (aka Alec Station); special advisor to the chief of the bin Laden unit from September 2001 to November 2004; author of Imperial Hubris: Why the West is Losing the War on Terror
- Robin Schimminger '69 – New York state assemblyman
- Dale Volker '63 – New York state senator

== Sports ==
- Michael Buczkowski – general manager/vice president of the Buffalo Bisons
- Leroy Chollet – basketball player
- Tommy Colella – football player
- Cory Conacher – ice hockey player
- Corey Herring '08 − basketball player
- Robert A. MacKinnon '50 – former general manager, assistant coach, New Jersey Nets
- Chris Manhertz '14 – NFL tight end, former Canisius basketball player
- Johnny McCarthy – NBA player and coach; coached Golden Griffins men's basketball
- Gerry Meehan – former NHL player and general manager of the Buffalo Sabres
- Michael Meeks – basketball player
- Beth Phoenix − WWE professional wrestler; Class of 2017 WWE Hall of Famer, former WWE Divas Champion & three-time WWE Women's Champion
- Dick Poillon − early National Football League player
- Mike Rappl '77 – former head coach of the Canisius Golden Griffins softball team
- Michael F. Smrek '85 – former professional basketball player, NBA Los Angeles Lakers
- Eyal Yaffe '86 – basketball player, Israeli Basketball Premier League
