= Dennis P. Gallagher =

American politician

Member of the New York City Council from the 30th district
- In office January 1, 2002 – March 17, 2008
- Preceded by: Thomas Ognibene
- Succeeded by: Anthony Como

Personal details
- Born: December 19, 1963 (age 62) Queens, New York, U.S.
- Party: Republican

Dennis P. Gallagher (born December 19, 1963) is a former New York City Council member who represented the 30th district in Queens, including the neighborhoods of Middle Village, Glendale, Ridgewood, Richmond Hill, Woodhaven, and Forest Hills. Gallagher was one of only three Republicans in the 51-member city council, and the only one not representing a Staten Island district.

== Biography ==
Born in Brooklyn, New York, he was the middle child of 7 children. Gallagher attended St. Michael's elementary school, Power Memorial Academy and Pace University.

Gallagher held a variety of positions in the public sector before being elected to office. These positions included Investigator for the State of New York Crime Victims Board, Regional Coordinator for the New York State Assembly, Executive Assistant (secretary) to State Senator Serphin R. Maltese, and Chief of Staff to his predecessor, Councilman Thomas V. Ognibene.

Gallagher was first elected to the council in 2001. He won re-election in 2005. He resigned his office after being charged with rape and eventually pleaded guilty to forcible sexual touching and sexual abuse in the third degree on March 17, 2008 in Queens County Criminal Court.

Political offices
Preceded by Thomas Ognibene	New York City Council, 30th district 2002–2008	Succeeded by Anthony Como
Preceded by John Fusco	Minority Whip, New York City Council; 2002–2008	Succeeded by Vincent Ignizio
