= Sunset Park Historic District =

Historic district in North Carolina, United States

- U.S. National Register of Historic Places
- U.S. Historic district
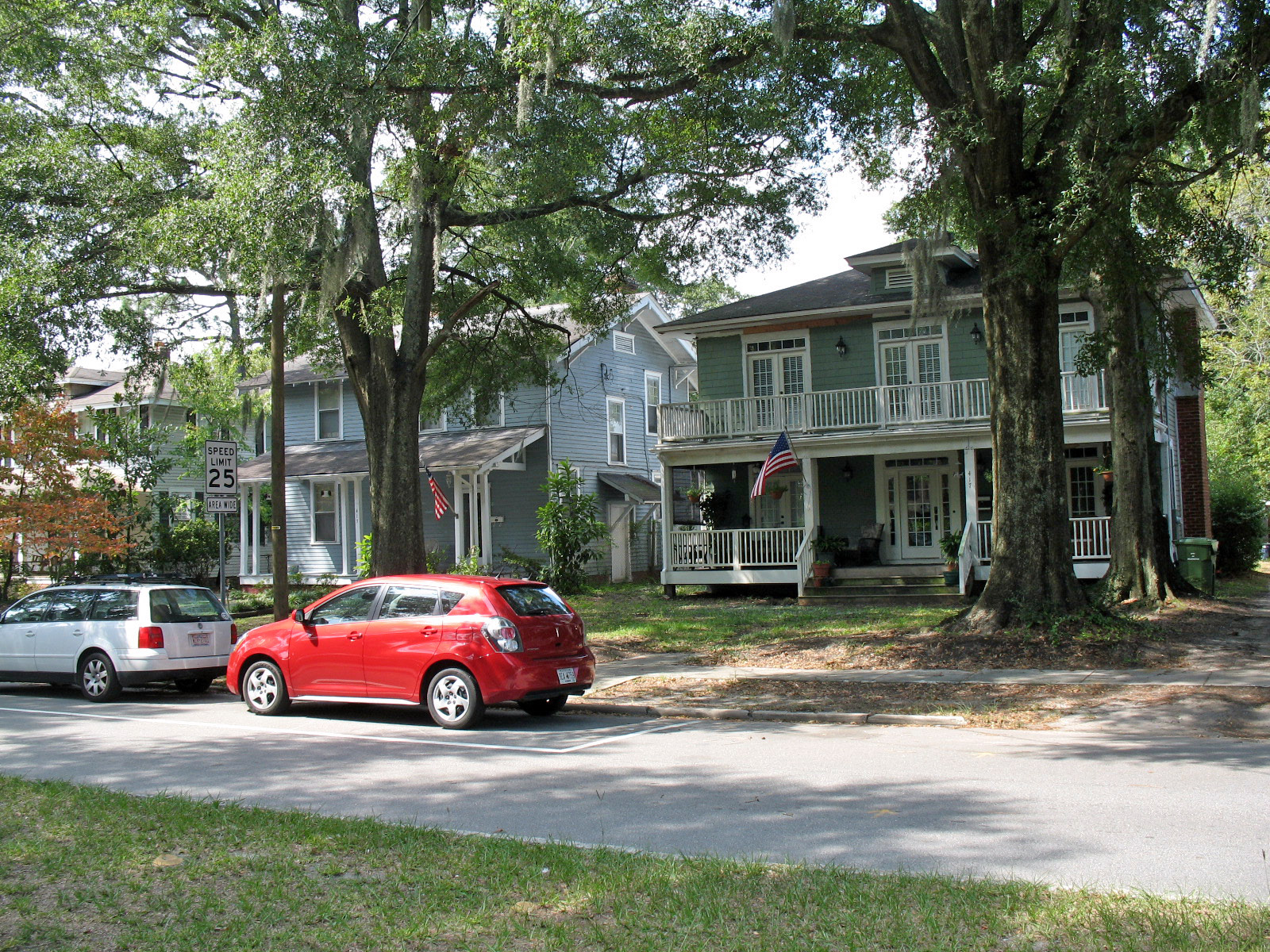
- Sunset Park Historic District, September 2009

- Location within North Carolina Location within the United States
- Location: Roughly bounded by Carolina Beach Rd., Southern Blvd., Burnett Blvd., and Sunset Ave., Wilmington, North Carolina
- Coordinates: 34°12′14″N 77°56′45″W
- Area: 227 acres (92 ha)
- Built: 1914
- Architect: Stephens, Burett; Gouse, James F.
- Architectural style: Bungalow/craftsman, Colonial Revival
- NRHP reference No.: 03001265
- Added to NRHP: December 10, 2003

Sunset Park is a neighborhood south of the Historic Downtown of Wilmington, in New Hanover County, North Carolina, United States. It was designated a national historic district on the National Register of Historic Places in 2003.

== History ==
"Sunset Park," a name submitted by Montrose Bain, circulation editor of the Wilmington Star, was the winning entry for a new 600-acre (2.4 km^{2}) development just 3 miles (4.8 km) south of downtown Wilmington along the Federal Point Road (Carolina Beach Road). The prize for his submission was $10.00.

The Fidelity Trust & Development Company purchased the 600-acre (2.4 km^{2}) tract on March 9, 1912. The original owner, T.F. Boyd of Hamlet, North Carolina, sold the land for $35,000.00. The Opening Sale of lots in Sunset Park to the public was originally Monday, September 16, 1912. The date was later postponed to Monday, October 7, 1912.

Sunset Park was envisioned by the Fidelity Development & Investment Company as a high-class, planned community with views overlooking the Cape Fear River and picturesque Greenfield Lake. All the city conveniences and modern improvements would be guaranteed by FD&I. These included street car service, electric lights, gas, sewers, sidewalks, and tree-lined macadam-type roadways and plazas. The neighborhood is said to be modeled after Ansley Park and Westland Estates in Atlanta, Georgia.

== Poem ==
In the October 5, 1912 edition of The Evening Dispatch was a pen drawing of a bird's-eye view over Sunset Park, along with a poem singing its praises.

Beyond the placid waters/Of Greenfield's lovely lake,
There lies as fair a region/As skillful hands can make.

It reaches to the 'Dram Tree',/Made famous long ago;
And many mounds and batt'ries/Its history will show.

Regardless of the prices/It costs to reach the mark,
We'll beautify the landscape/Of lovely Sunset Park.

With granolithic side-walks,/And streets macadamized,
We'll leave all other places/Neglected and despised.

Each man who owns a cottage,/That he can call his own,
Will be a little Monarch/That no one can dethrone.

Each lot will have its sewers,/To take the filth away;
And water-mains to furnish/The folks who come to stay.

The sun will shine in daylight,/Electric lights at dark;
We'll have a Fairy City/At lovely Sunset Park.

To each prospective buyer/We'll offer terms to please,
So that every one may purchase/A home with perfect ease.

No painter can portray it,/His brush would be too dark,
To give the glowing colors/of lovely SUNSET PARK.

== Architecture ==
The majority of resources were built from the 1910s to the 1960s and incorporate Queen Anne, Bungalow/American Craftsman, Tudorbethan, Colonial Revival, Cape Cod, ranch, and commercial styles of architecture. The earliest houses are scattered along Northern and Central boulevards; 1940 to 1950s Cape Cod and Ranch houses line the cross streets. Architecturally, the earliest designs are Queen Anne style, dating to the early 1910s. The two-story dwellings have hipped or gabled roofs, wraparound porches, corner towers, bay windows, projecting wings, wood or simulated siding, shingles, decorative brickwork, and a wide range of window types.

A large number of homes were built from 1940 to 1943 when the North Carolina Shipbuilding Company expanded its facilities on land intended for Sunset Park homes along the eastern edge of the Cape Fear River.

The movie Blue Velvet had scenes filmed in Sunset Park, including the house of Detective John Williams. Season 9 of Matlock had scenes filmed in Sunset Park, including Ben Matlock's house.

== Gallery ==
Designation sign on Northern Blvd. Pergola

Pen Drawing of Sunset Park, 1912

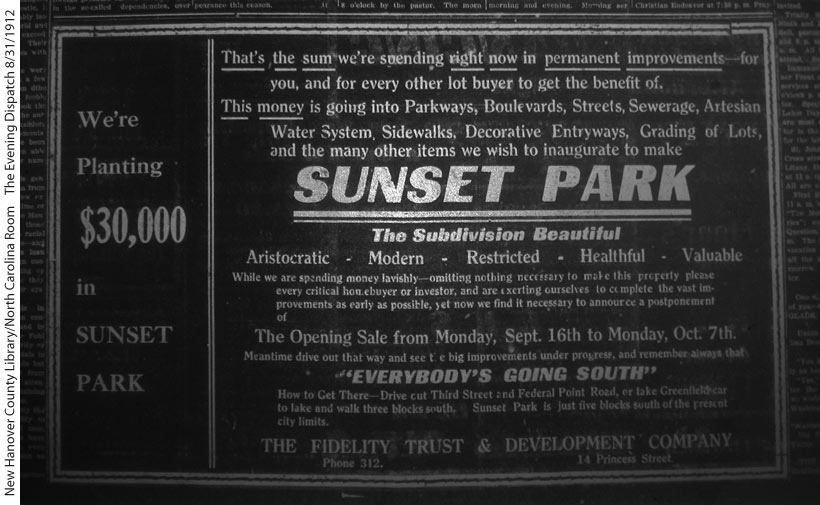
Opening sale ad from August 31, 1912

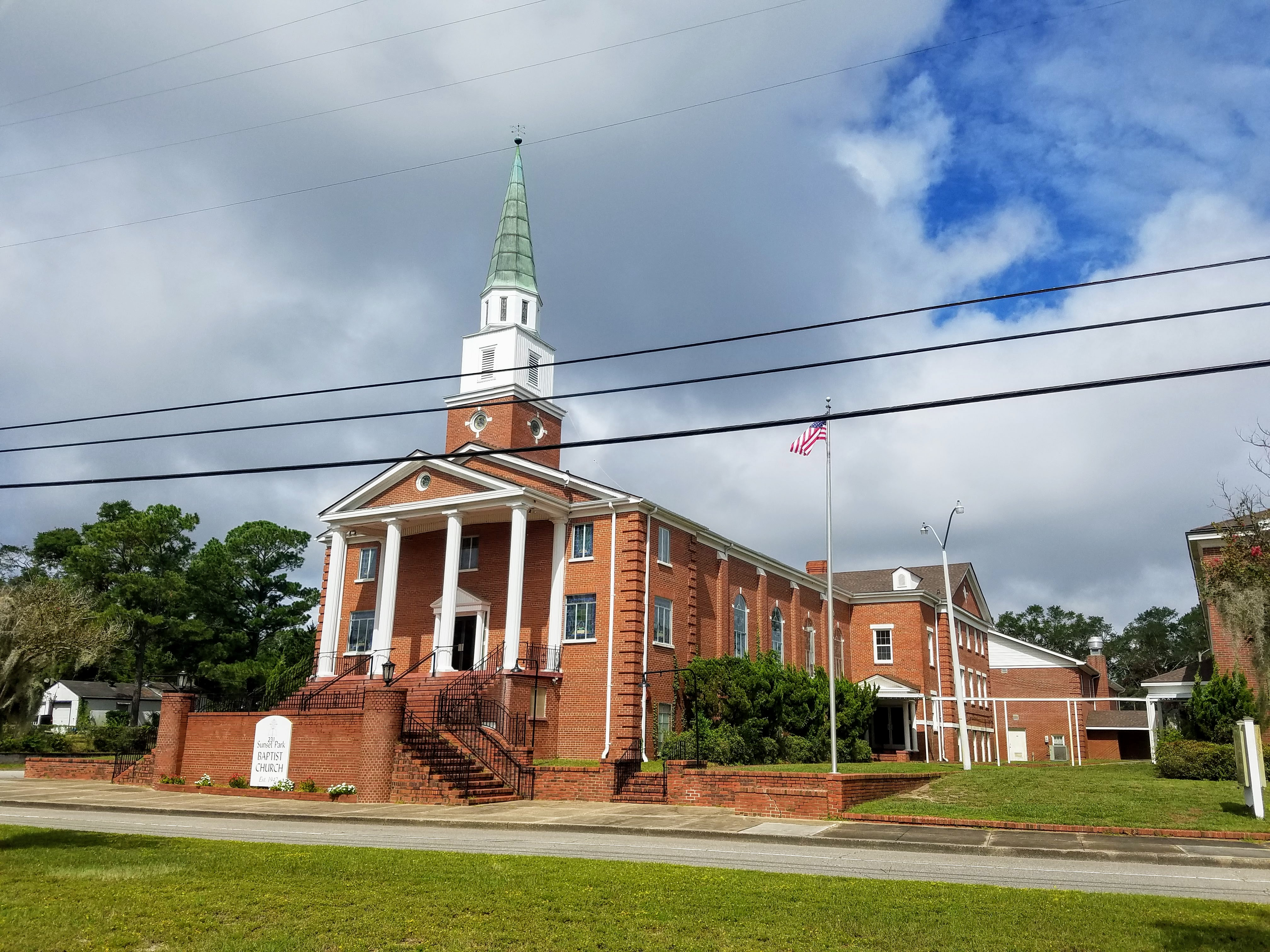
Sunset Park Baptist Church, 2020

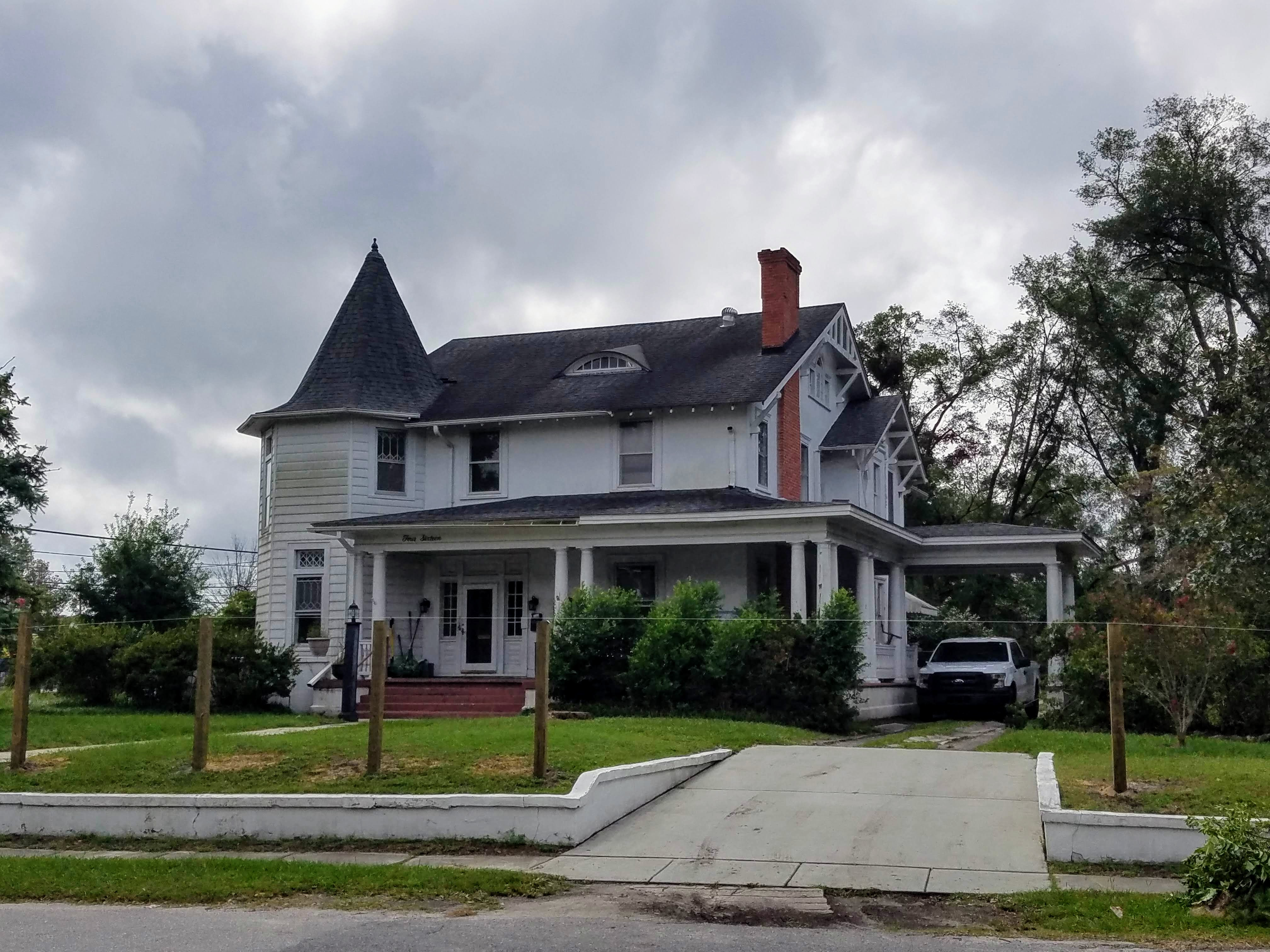
D.N. Chadwick House, 2020

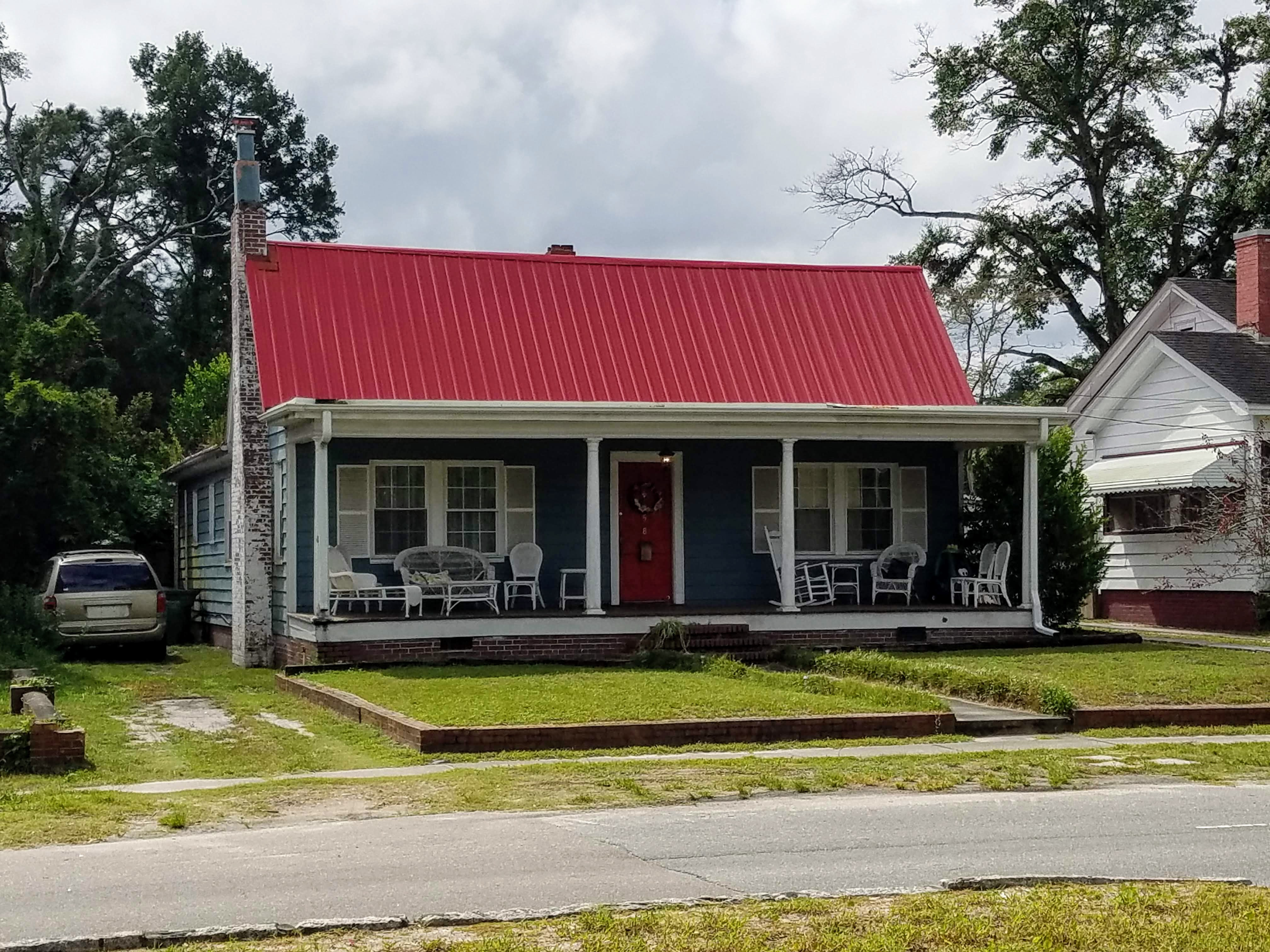
Maillison House, 2020

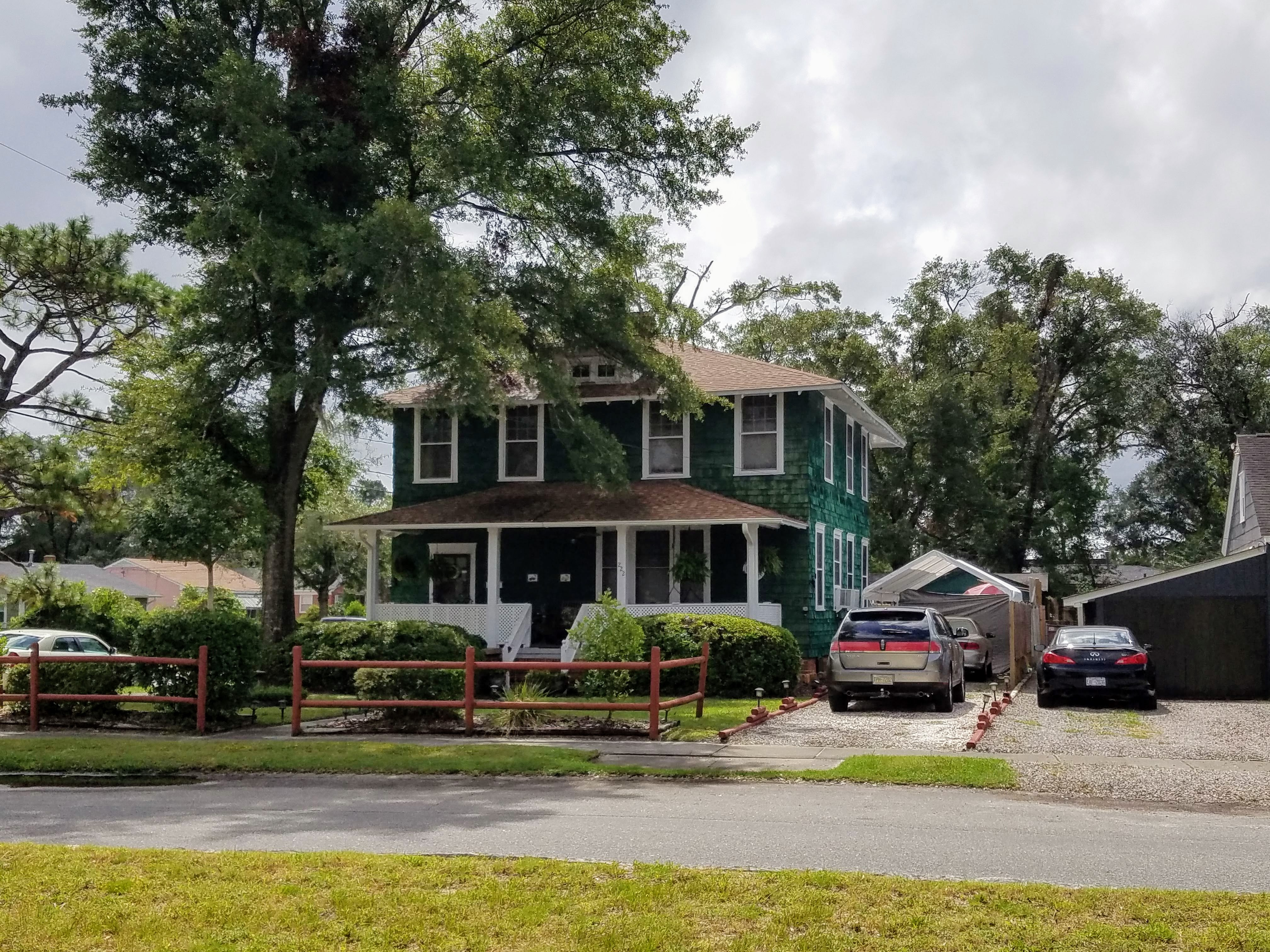
George Biddle House, 2020
