= Patrick M. Gallivan =

American politician

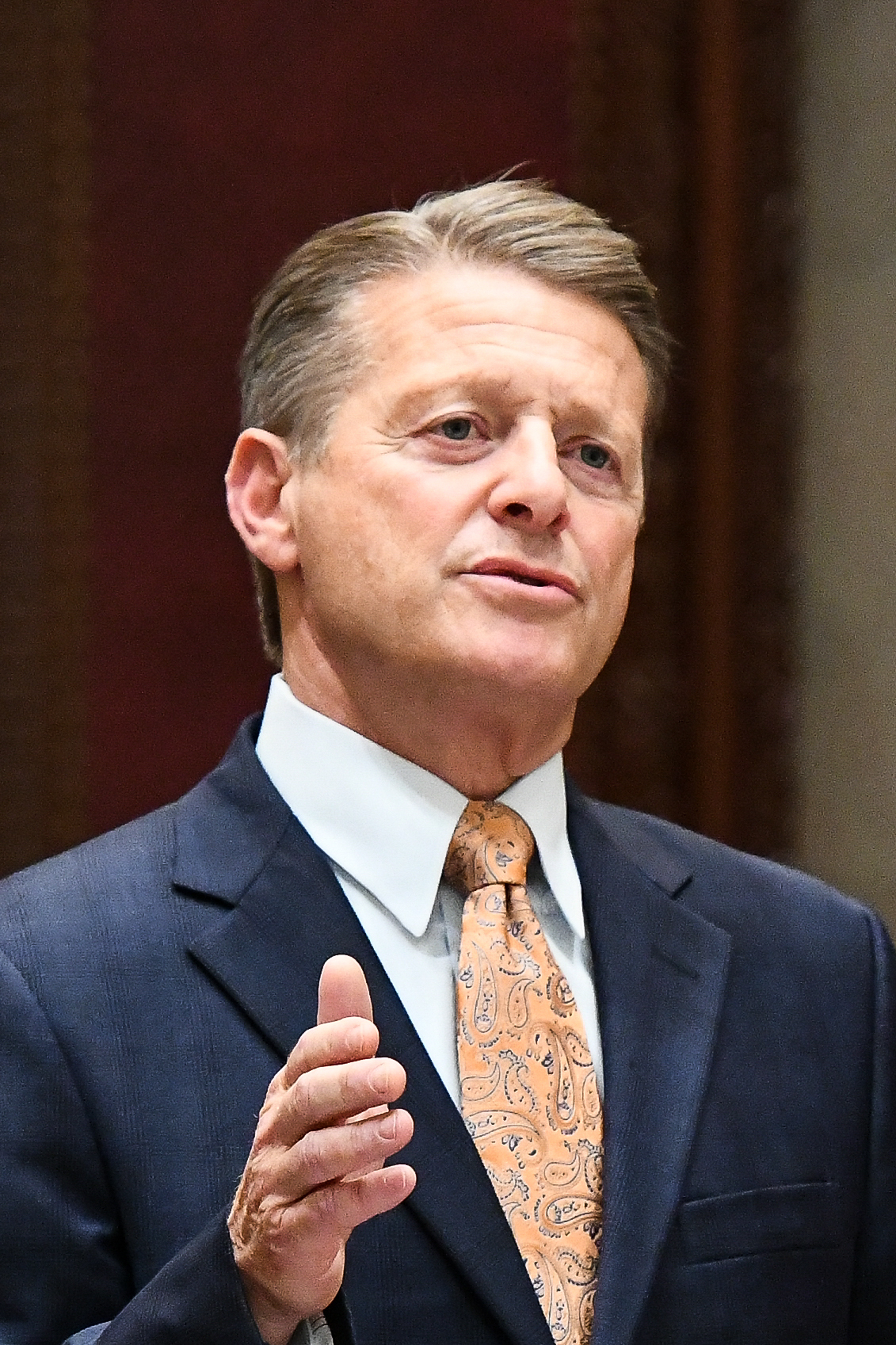

Member of the New York Senate from the 60th district
- Incumbent
- Assumed office January 1, 2011
- Preceded by: Dale Volker
- Constituency: 59th District (2011–2022); 60th District (2023–present)

52nd Sheriff of Erie County
- In office 1998–2005
- Preceded by: Thomas F. Higgins
- Succeeded by: Timothy B. Howard

Personal details
- Born: November 18, 1960 (age 65)
- Party: Republican
- Spouse: Mary Pat Gallivan
- Website: Official website

Patrick M. Gallivan (born November 18, 1960) is a member of the New York State Senate and the former Sheriff of Erie County. Gallivan's district, the 60th, comprises portions of Erie County, the entirety of Wyoming County, the northern half of Livingston County and the towns of Henrietta and Wheatland in Monroe County.

== Biography ==
Gallivan was elected Sheriff of Erie County in 1998 and served through 2005. Prior to being elected Sheriff, Patrick Gallivan served 15 years in the New York State Police, rising through the ranks from Trooper to Captain. Between his time as Sheriff and as a New York State Senator, Gallivan served as a commissioner on the state parole board.

After the retirement of incumbent senator Dale Volker, Gallivan defeated former Erie County Republican Party chairman James Domagalski and David DiPietro in a three-way Republican primary in September 2010, going on to defeat Democrat Cynthia Appleton and DiPietro (who continued to run on a line labeled "Tea") in the general election in November of the same year. In 2011, Gallivan voted against allowing same-sex marriage in New York during the senate roll-call vote on the Marriage Equality Act, which legally recognized same-sex marriages performed in the state, in a closely divided Senate vote of 33-29.

== Personal ==
Gallivan lives in Elma, New York, with his wife, Mary Pat, and their two children, Jenna and Conor.

Gallivan's cousin, Pete Gallivan, is a reporter and anchor for Buffalo television station WGRZ.

== Education ==
Patrick Gallivan holds a master's degree in Criminal Justice from the State University of New York at Albany and is a graduate of Canisius College in Buffalo. He is a graduate of both the FBI National Executive Institute and the FBI National Academy, and is a past member of the New York State Executive Committee on Counter-Terrorism.

Police appointments
Preceded by Thomas F. Higgins	Sheriff of Erie County, New York; 1998 – 2005	Succeeded by Timothy B. Howard
New York State Senate
Preceded by Dale M. Volker	Member of the New York State Senate from the 59th district 2011–present	Incumbent
