= UNICO =

Defunct technology transfer organization

Unico was a technology transfer organization that represented the Technology Exploitation companies of UK Universities. It was founded in 1994. In October 2009 it merged with Praxis (founded in 2002) and is now known as PraxisUnico.

Unico's website stated that "It provides a forum for exchange and development of best practice. Member companies transfer technology and expertise through the formation of Spin-out companies, licensing, consultancy, training, design and development projects, contract research, testing and evaluation, and problem solving."
