= 2026 New York Attorney General election =

- November 3, 2026
- Reporting: 96.2% as of Nov 19 at 4:18 PM EST

Nominee	Letitia James	Saritha Komatireddy
Party	Democratic	Republican
Alliance	Working Families	Conservative
Popular vote	3,647,760	2,410,458
Percentage	60.2%	39.8%
- James: 40–50% 50–60% 60–70% 70–80% 80–90% >90% Komatireddy: 40–50% 50–60% 60–70% 70–80% 80–90% >90%
Attorney General before election
Letitia James
Democratic
Elected Attorney General
Letitia James
Democratic

The 2026 New York Attorney General election took place on November 3, 2026, to elect the attorney general of New York. Democratic incumbent Letitia James won re-election to a third term. She defeated Republican former federal prosecutor Saritha Komatireddy.

== Democratic primary ==
=== Candidates ===
==== Nominee ====
- Letitia James, incumbent attorney general (2019–present)

=== Endorsements ===
Letitia James

Labor unions

- Civil Service Employees Association
- District Council 37
- Retail, Wholesale and Department Store Union

Organizations

- End Citizens United
- New York State Alliance for Retired Americans
- People for the American Way

Political parties

- Brooklyn Democratic Party

== Republican primary ==
=== Candidates ===
==== Nominee ====
- Saritha Komatireddy, former federal prosecutor

==== Withdrawn ====
- Khurram Dara, regulatory attorney (endorsed Komatireddy)
- Michael Henry, nominee in 2022

=== Endorsements ===
Saritha Komatireddy

U.S. executive branch officials

- Dennis Vacco, former U.S. attorney for the western district of New York (1988–1993) and attorney general of New York (1995–1998)

U.S. representatives

- Mike Lawler, NY-17 (2023–present) (previously endorsed Henry)
- John Faso, former NY-19 (2017–2019) and State Assembly minority leader (1998–2002) from AD-102 (1987–2002)

State officials

- George Pataki, former governor of New York (1995–2006)

Local officials

- Ray Kelly, former New York City police commissioner (1992–1994, 2002–2013) and Under Secretary of the Treasury for Terrorism and Financial Intelligence (1996–1998) (Independent)

Labor unions

- Police Benevolent Associations of New York State, Buffalo, Rochester, and Syracuse

Media

- The New York Post
- The Jewish Press

Organizations

- Maggie's List

Political parties

- Conservative Party of New York State
- New York Republican State Committee

Individuals

- Marty Dolan, investment banker and Democratic candidate for New York's 14th congressional district in 2024
- Bob Holden, former Democratic member of the New York City Council from the 30th district
- Elisha Wiesel, businessman and son of Elie Wiesel
Michael Henry (withdrawn)

U.S. representatives

- ~~Mike Lawler, NY-17 (2023–present)~~ (later endorsed Komatireddy)
- Elise Stefanik, NY-21 (2015–present)

State legislators

- Michael Tannousis, state assemblymember from AD-64 (2021–present) and chair of the Staten Island Republican Party (2022–present)

Party officials

- Andrea Catsimatidis, chair of the Manhattan Republican Party (2017–present)
- Liam McCabe, chair of the Brooklyn Republican Party (2015–present)
- Tony Nunziato, chair of the Queens Republican Party (2022–present)
- Michael Rendino, chair of the Bronx Republican Party (2017–present)

Political parties

- Sullivan County Conservative Party

== General election ==
=== Predictions ===
Source	Ranking	As of
Sabato's Crystal Ball	Safe D	August 21, 2025

=== Post-primary endorsements ===
Saritha Komatireddy (R)

Executive branch officials

- Donald Trump, president of the United States (2017–2021, 2025–present)

=== Fundraising ===
Campaign finance reports as of October 19, 2026
Candidate	Raised	Spent
Letitia James (D)	$11,532,992	$8,741,665
Saritha Komatireddy (R)	$4,062,836	$3,123,678
Source: Transparency USA

=== Debate ===
2026 New York Attorney General election debate
No.	Date	Host	Moderator	Link	Democratic	Republican
Key: P Participant						
Key: P Participant					Letitia James	Saritha Komatireddy
1	Oct. 8, 2026	NY1	Susan Arbetter; Errol Louis	YouTube	P	P

=== Polling ===
Poll source	Date(s) administered	Sample size	Margin of error	Letitia James (D)	Saritha Komatireddy (R)	Undecided
Siena College	October 19–22, 2026	807 (LV)	± 4.1%	54%	39%	6%
OnMessage Inc. (R) (Note: Internal poll for Komatireddy's campaign)	October 12–14, 2026	1,000 (LV)	± 2.8%	51%	45%	4%
Siena College	September 11–17, 2026	1,144 (LV)	± 3.9%	52%	39%	10%
Siena College	August 3–6, 2026	811 (LV)	± 4.2%	54%	36%	10%

=== Results ===
2026 New York Attorney General election
Party	Candidate	Votes	%	±%
Democratic	Letitia James			
Working Families	Letitia James			
Total	Letitia James (incumbent)	3,647,760	60.2	
Republican	Saritha Komatireddy			
Conservative	Saritha Komatireddy			
Total	Saritha Komatireddy	2,410,458	39.8	
Write-in		4,503	0.1	
Total votes		6,062,721	100.0	
Democratic hold				

== See also ==
- 2026 United States attorney general elections
