= Manhattan Republican Party =

Affiliate of the Republican Party in New York City

- Chairwoman: Andrea Catsimatidis
- Founded: 1855; 171 years ago
- Youth wing: New York Young Republican Club
- Ideology: Conservatism
- National affiliation: Republican Party
- Regional affiliation: New York Republican State Committee
- Colors: Red
- New York State Assembly: 0 / 150
- New York State Senate: 0 / 63
- Citywide Executive Offices: 0 / 5
- New York City Council: 0 / 51

Website
- manhattanrepublicanparty.org

The Manhattan Republican Party is a regional affiliate of the United States Republican Party for the borough of Manhattan in New York City, New York.

== Leadership ==
The Manhattan Republican Party is governed by its 500+ member New York County Republican Committee, elected from and by registered Republicans with residence within the borough. In addition, there is a party executive, that, since 2017 has consisted of:

- Chairwoman
  - Andrea Catsimatidis
- First Vice-chairman
  - Robert Morgan
- Second Vice-chairman
  - Peter Hein
- Secretary
  - Debra Leible
- Treasurer
  - Nick Viest
- Vice-presidents
  - Dr. Jeff Ascherman, Will Brown Jr., John Catsimatidis Jr., Margo Catsimatidis, Edwin DeLaCruz, Charles E. Dorkey, III, Bradley Fishel, Joyce Giuffra, Pete Holmberg, Troy Johnson, David Laska, Ken Moltner, Dr. Devi Nampiaparampil, Helen Qiu, Ashton Theodore Randle, Matt Rich, Todd Shapiro, Donna Soloway, Chris Taylor, Jackie Toboroff, and Frederic M. Umane.
- Political Director
  - Robert Morgan Jr.

== History ==
Founded alongside the New York Republican State Committee in 1855, the party has never held control of the Borough, and has constantly been behind the Manhattan Democratic Party, however, the party has seen several prominent figures elected nationally despite this, including: Theodore Roosevelt, Fiorello LaGuardia, Frederic René Coudert Jr., Ruth Pratt, Jacob K. Javits, MacNeil Mitchell, Louis J. Lefkowitz, Stanley M. Isaacs, John Lindsay, Theodore R. Kupferman, Whitney North Seymour Jr., Bill Green, Roy Goodman, John Ravitz, Charles Millard, Andrew Eristoff, Rudy Giuliani, Michael Bloomberg, and Thomas E. Dewey.

For the two decades from 1990 to 2010, the Manhattan Republican Party was very competitive with their Democratic counterparts, electing two mayors, Giuliani and Bloomberg, and maintaining a centrist and moderate outlook when compared to the rest of the Party, in line with Rockefeller Republican views. However, the party would decline as its leadership began to support Donald Trump and his policies, which resulted in the party's moderate and centrist voter base largely swinging to the Democrats.

=== Executive Committee (1855–1890) ===
The party originally did not have a singular executive, but rather a committee acting as the party's executive. Mostly an extension of the New York County Republican Committee, the Executive Committee had the New York Committee perform most of the day-to-day operations for the party and only intervened when a deadlock was reached. Membership to the Executive Committee was largely ceremonial and reserved for the more senior members of the party. Throughout its existence, the Committee was filled with members who were bought and paid controlled opposition to William M. Tweed, allowing him to practically rule the city by decree until his downfall in 1871.

=== Jacob M. Patterson (1890–1894) ===
Described as a political boss, Jacob M. Patterson ran an effective political machine in Manhattan to rival the power of Tammany Hall. However, voices within the party, led by Edwin Einstein, opposed the machine and boss politics. Patterson would enter a feud with Senator Thomas C. Platt, who had taken control of the New York Republican State Committee, when he voted for Benjamin Harrison at the 1892 Republican National Convention against Platt's wishes. Platt and his supporters was able to have a party convention called in 1894 which saw Patterson replaced, however, Platt's men where unable to take control of the party.

=== William Brookfield (1894–1895) ===
In a highly contentious convention in 1894, the party elected William Brookfield as chairman defying Senator Thomas C. Platt who sought to take control of the city's party. Brookfield was supported by Patterson, and most of the older leaders of the Borough's Party, and his election resulted in violent protests by Platt men outside the hall which had to be repulsed by police. Brookfield was a member of the Committee of Seventy which nominated a fusion candidate to defeat Tammany hall in the 1895 New York City mayoral election. Platt, however, would not end his campaign for control over the city's party and was able to get another convention called in 1895 which saw Brookfield be removed from office.

=== Edward Lauterbach (1895) ===
Attorney Edward Lauterbach, a Platt man, would serve as "temporary chairman" in 1895 until a new convention could be called to elect a new chairman.

=== Matthew Linn Bruce (1895–1904) ===
A Rutgers College educated Lawyer, Matthew Linn Bruce moved to New York City in 1890, working as a clerk for a law firm, and being involved in his local assembly's Republican politics. He was admitted to the Bar in 1894, and was elected chairman of the party in 1895. During his time as chairman, he sought to combat election fraud, especially fraud committed by fellow Republicans, earning him the ire of a contingent of the party. In December 1903 he was pressured to retire by Governor Odell, with his resignation coming in January 1904. He would go on to be elected the Lieutenant Governor of New York serving from 1905 to 1906 when he resigned to accept a seat on the New York Supreme Court.

=== William Halpin (1904–1905) ===
Chairman for a single year. He had been selected chairman in 1904, and during his acceptance speech, he called the Manhattan Republican party too "self-centered" and urged the party to toe the national line and support William Howard Taft. Despite his backing from Taft, allegations surfaced that Halpin was corrupt, and a group of businessmen pressured for an election to replace him. Halpin would face off against two other candidates and lose.

=== Herbert Parsons (1905–1910) ===
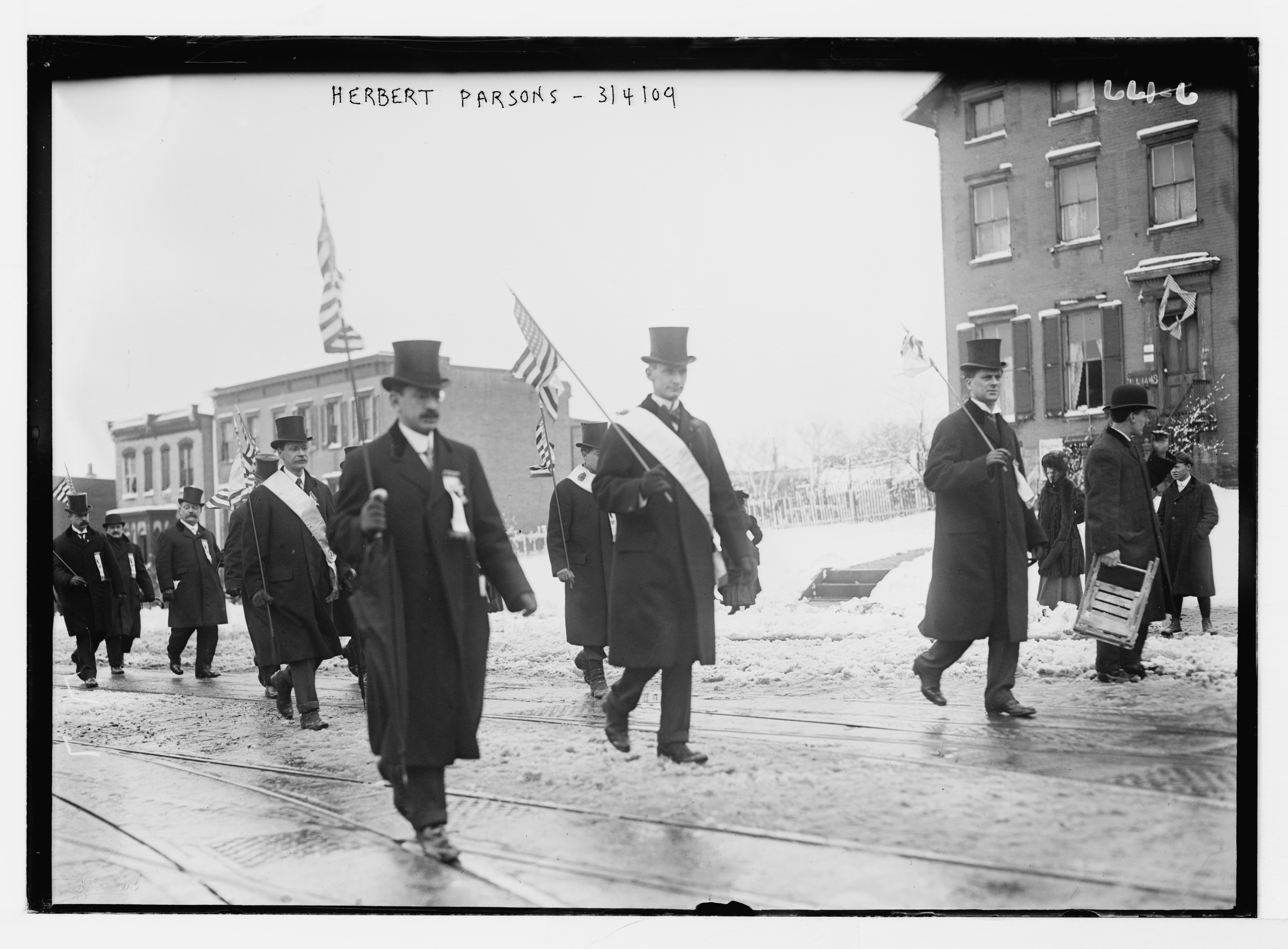
Chairman Herbert Parsons marching in a parade

Coming from a long line of prominent lawyers, Herbert Parsons was a Yale Law School educated lawyer and was elected to the New York City Board of Aldermen from 1900 to 1904 when he was elected to Congress to represent the 13th district. Parsons was elected chairman during a period of intense infighting among the Republican committee, he was officially backed by Theodore Roosevelt and business interests, while the incumbent Halpin was backed by William Howard Taft, a third candidate, J. Van Vechten Olcott, would be endorsed by Senator Thomas C. Platt. He would serve as chairman until 1910 when he also lost his re-election bid for a third term to Congress and would return to his law practice. Despite his resignation, he continued to offer counsel and advice to the inexperienced Griscom on naming candidates.

=== Lloyd C. Griscom (1910–1912) ===
A University of Pennsylvania Law School educated lawyer, Lloyd C. Griscom served in a series of diplomatic offices, as the secretary to ambassador to the United Kingdom Thomas F. Bayard and ambassador himself to Persia (1901), Japan (1902 to 1906), Brazil (1906 to 1907) and Italy (1907 to 1909). Upon his return to Manhattan in 1910, he became involved in Republican social circles. In 1910, the New York County Republican Committee chairman Parsons resigned, and Griscom was offered the office by the political boss and close personal friend Otto Bannard, who had unsuccessfully run for mayor in 1905. Lacking any experience or training, Griscom accepted the offer, as he described, in "fear and trembling." Shortly after becoming party chairman, Griscom would go on to help found the New York Young Republican Club along with thirty-one other Manhattanite Republican politicos. He would be the first member of that organization to serve as party chairman. As chairman, he had to find a suitable candidate for the 1910 New York state election and ended up choosing another lawyer and friend, Henry L. Stimson. This caused problems as incumbent president William Howard Taft opposed Stimson, while former president Theodore Roosevelt supported Stimson. Roosevelt ended up personally campaigning for Stimson, who ended up narrowly losing to John Alden Dix. However, the leader of Tammany Hall told Griscom after the election, if the campaign lasted another week, he would have expected Stimson to win. Griscom resigned shortly after the 1912 Republican National Convention, which he described as "the most painful situations I ever knew and led to my ultimate disgust with politics."

=== Samuel S. Koenig (1912–1933) ===
A Hungarian-Jew immigrant and New York University School of Law educated lawyer, Koenig was elected the leader of the sixth ward and was a presidential elector in 1900. He was elected Secretary of State of New York in 1908, losing re-election in 1910, and in 1912 he was hand selected as the chairman of the party by Griscom when he resigned, serving until 1933.

During Koenig's tenure, the party nominated an African American, Charles H. Roberts, for Congress in New York's 21st district. One of the first African Americans elected to the New York City Board of Aldermen, Roberts became the first black Republican nominated for Congress in a northern state.

=== Chase Mellen Jr. (1933–1935) ===
Elected in 1933, defeating the incumbent Samuel S. Koenig, Chase Mellen Jr., a Harvard graduate, WWI veteran, and member of the New York Young Republican Club which helped him oust the incumbent Chairman Koening. Mellen ran an anti-establishment tenure of the party, insisting that "statesmen" and other career politicians had no place in the Manhattan Republican Party. In 1934, Mellen endorsed Joseph McGoldrick alongside the chairman of the Brooklyn Republicans to become New York City Comptroller, in an election where McGoldrick would win. Mellen would resign in 1935 after a period where seemingly all his endorsed candidates would either refuse to run for re-election or outright refuse his endorsement. His daughter, Marisa would go on to be the leader of the Republicans-for-Roosevelt in New York City.

=== Kenneth F. Simpson (1935–1940) ===
A Harvard Law School educated lawyer and veteran of the Pancho Villa Expedition, World War I, and like his predecessor, also a member of the New York Young Republican Club, Simpson was a prominent Roosevelt Republican, he was elected the chairman of the party in 1935 and led the party through five of its most turbulent years. He successfully got Fiorello La Guardia re-elected, severely damaging the power of the Democratic Tammany Hall in the city and campaigned heavily for Thomas E. Dewey's 1938 bid for governor. Despite losing the election, due to his campaign efforts, Simpson was named to the Republican National Committee. However, Simpson and Dewey would have a series of clashes culminating in Simpson's resignation as party chairman over the rejection of the removal of David B. Costuma as one of the states electors in December 1940. He would be elected to the United States House of Representatives for the 17th district. However, he would die only 20 days into his term on January 25, 1941, from a heart attack.

=== Thomas J. Curran (1940–1958) ===
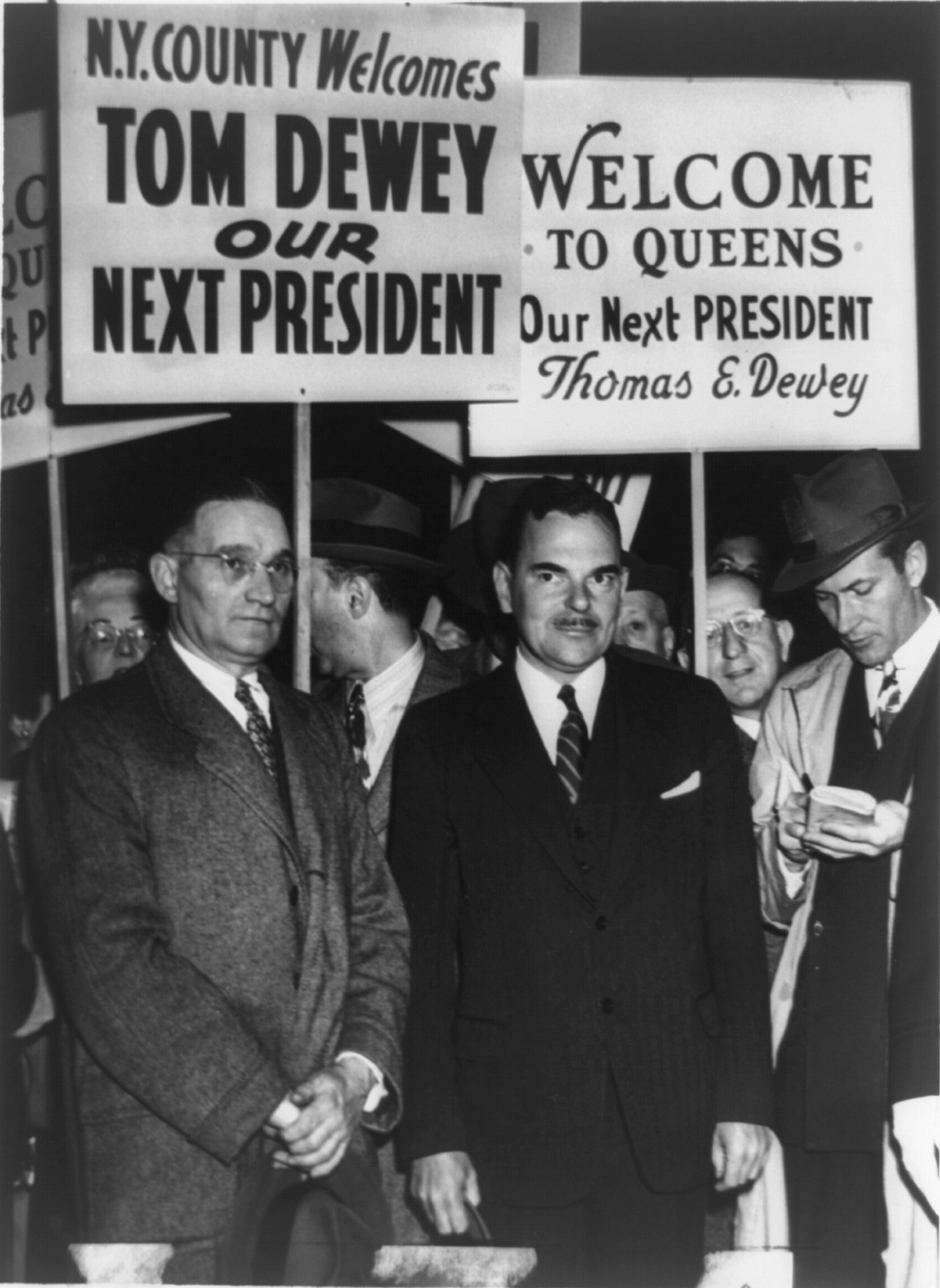
Chairman Thomas J. Curran with 1948 Presidential Candidate Thomas E. Dewey

A Manhattan native, Curran served during WWI. He, like his predecessor, was also a member of the New York Young Republican Club being the third successive party chairman to hail from that organization. In 1928, he became an Assistant United States Attorney in the Southern District of New York. In 1933 he was elected as a New York City alderman and was elected the council's minority leader in 1934. He was elected the chairman of the party in 1940. During his time as chairman, he would challenge Robert F. Wagner during the 1944 New York state election, losing 3,294,576 to 2,899,497. He supported the abolition of the United States Electoral College to the point where, before an assembly of the 1944 NY electors, he stated that this would likely be their last meeting. Curran would die in office on January 20, 1958.

=== Bernard Newman (1958–1962) ===
A local judge, Bernard Newman was selected as the party chairman in 1958 and acted as a rival to the powerful Tammany Hall boss Carmine DeSapio. During his tenure he restructured the entire party in 1961, heavily strengthening the party's executive branch, and weakening the party's committee. He was also remembered for his lengthy and loud rivalry with mayor Robert F. Wagner Jr., calling him a "peanut politician" during the 1960 United States presidential election when he welcomed and met with John F. Kennedy but not Richard Nixon. In 1962 Mayor Wagner named Newman to the Family Court and Governor Rockefeller would name him to the New York Supreme Court and also served in various federal courts.

=== Vincent Albano Jr. (1962–1981) ===
A banker born in 1914, Vincent Albano Jr. got involved in politics in 1949 when he became the Republican leader of his Assembly District in Stuyvesant Town. Identified with the more liberal faction of the party, he led a push to have more women run in elections against their male Democratic counterparts. His Democratic counterparts called him a "corrupt political boss" following accusations he bribed the city for $840,000 in contracts to be awarded to companies run by his personal friends, and for putting his family members on the party payroll. In 1980 he was the oldest Republican chairman in the state and supported George H. W. Bush during the 1980 Republican Party presidential primaries over eventual winner Ronald Reagan. Albano would die in office at the age of 67 from a heart attack and would be a return of a member or alumnus of the New York Young Republican Club holding the office after a brief intermission with the tenure of Bernard Newman. The Vincent F. Albano Jr. Playground is named in his honor.

=== Roy M. Goodman (1981–2002) ===
Grandson and heir to the fortune of Israel Matz, the founder of the Ex-Lax pharmaceutical company, Roy M. Goodman was a figurehead of the so-called silk-stocking Republicans who were even more moderate, liberal, and left-leaning than the Rockefeller Republicans. Goodman was elected to the New York State Senate in 1968, serving until 2002, with his 33 years in the Senate being one of the longest tenures in New York State history. He ran for mayor in 1977 being defeated in a landslide by Mario Cuomo and Ed Koch, despite polls showing him up 5 to 6%. Goodman would become the party chairman in 1981 and hold the office for over two decades until 2002. He was an alumnus of the New York Young Republican Club and would be the last member or alumnus of that organization to hold the office of party chairman. During this, he frequently clashed with the party due to his support of gun control, gay marriage, and a restoration of the death penalty. As such, he had little sway over the party. The committee ran most of the day-to-day, with Goodman preoccupied in Albany and only coming down to Manhattan for galas and fundraisers on behalf of the committee. After leaving both the senate and chairmanship in 2002, Mayor Michael Bloomberg named him the President of the United Nations Development Corporation which sought to replace and then demolish the Headquarters of the United Nations.

=== John Ravitz (2002–2003) ===
Following his departure from the State Assembly after an unsuccessful bid to the State Senate in 2002, John Ravitz briefly became chairman of the party until his selection to be the executive director of the New York Board of Elections in 2003.

=== James Ortenzio (2003–2007) ===
In 2003, James Ortenzio, chairman of the Hudson River Park Trust from 1999 to his election, and influential local businessman who owned several meat packing facilities was elected chairman of the party. He would retire from the chairmanship in 2007, however, it was revealed he had been committing tax-evasion and receiving large "donations" during his time in office. As chairman, Ortenzio had to submit an Annual Statement of Financial Disclosure with the New York State Ethics Commission, and in September 2004 he received $100,000 from Fisher Brothers for consulting services, which he did not disclose. He also did not disclose a payment of $80,000 to arbitrate in favor of Air Pegasus building a helipad near the Hudson River Park. He pleaded guilty to tax evasion in 2007 to evade jail time.

Despite being the chairman when a Manhattanite Republican, Michael Bloomberg, was mayor of New York, Bloomberg had no affiliation to the Manhattan Republican Part whatsoever, interacting with Ortenzio only during select public ceremonies, and never outside of official duties. Additionally, when the scope of Ortenzio's corruption became apparent in 2007, Bloomberg switched affiliations to Independent. Although Ortenzio was not the deciding factor in Bloomberg leaving the party, it did contribute to his distrust of the party and its inner workings.

=== Jennifer Saul-Yaffa (2007–2011) ===
The daughter of former Metropolitan Transportation Authority director Andrew Saul, she was elected to succeed Ortenzio in 2007. Then Jennifer Yaffa, she was seen largely as a continuation of his tenure, with both being closely aligned to Governor Pataki. A hands off Chairwoman, she let the New York County Republican Committee make most important decisions, acting mostly as a mouthpiece for the party. During what should've been a high point in the Republican party's popularity in the city, she and the other borough chairs had to deal with the sudden departure of mayor Michael Bloomberg from the Republican party to run as an Independent during the 2009 New York City mayoral election. In order to appear on the ballot as a Republican for mayor, one has to get the support from at least three of the borough's Republican parties. The Queens and Bronx parties where adamantly against Bloomberg, while the Staten Island and Brooklyn parties where reluctantly supporting him. This left the decision of if Bloomberg where to appear as a Republican on the ballot to Yaffa and the Manhattan Republican Party. In part due to Pataki's support for Bloomberg, Yaffa and the party backed Bloomberg.

=== Daniel Issacs (2011–2015) ===
A local attorney, Issacs was elected the chairman of the party in 2011 and focused most of his tenure in getting younger, college aged Republicans more involved in the party's day-to-day operations. However, his tenure would be rocked with scandal when he was offered a $25,000 bribe to help Democratic state Senator Malcolm Smith get on the Republican ballot for the 2013 New York City mayoral election. Issacs would be removed from the office by Edward F. Cox, chairman of the New York Republican State Committee, in 2015, not due to his scandal, but due to the fact his administration of the Manhattan Republican Party left it teetering on the edge of bankruptcy and from pressure from the Malpass family.

=== Adele Malpass (2015–2017) ===
Adele Malpass, wife of David Malpass, was elected the party's chairwoman in 2015. A former Senate Budget Committee staffer, during her tenure, she focused heavily on defeating Bill de Blasio in the 2017 New York City mayoral election, hosting a series of Republican candidates including Paul Massey, a real estate executive, Michel Faulkner, a pastor from Harlem, Richard Dietl, a retired NYPD detective, and the eventual candidate Nicole Malliotakis, an assemblywoman. In 2015 the party hosted NYC Police Commissioner Raymond Kelly at the Metropolitan Republican Club in an effort to draft him to run for mayor, however, he would decline to be a candidate. Although officially neutral on who the candidate would be, the party, and chairwoman Malpass actively limited Dietl's campaign, calling him too risky to run against DeBalsio due to his ability to generate headlines due to his crass and unprofessional behavior and speech. The Staten Island assemblywoman Malliotakis would win the primary, and go on to lose to de Blasio 66%-28%.

After the 2016 United States presidential election, the Manhattan Republican Party focused its efforts on the Upper East Side, where it sees the most support. Painting themselves as still moderates in line with the policies of Mayor Bloomberg, the party hoped to win a seat on the city council during the 2017 New York City Council election. However Adele's husband, David, was named the Under Secretary of the Treasury for International Affairs by President Trump in 2017, directly tying the Manhattan party to the president and his policies. The backlash to the Trump presidency prevented their hopeful swell of moderate Democrats voting for them.

After leaving the office Adele has served as a board member for the American Journalism Institute, has worked as a reporter for the Washington Examiner and The New York Sun as well as being the president of The Daily Caller News Foundation.

=== Andrea Catsimatidis (2017–present) ===
In 2017, the party elected Andrea Catsimatidis as their chairwoman. At the age of 29, Catsimatidis victory raised some eyebrows within the party, since her father, John Catsimatidis, was a lifelong Democrat and large donor to the Democrats. In response to this Andrea stated that "of course I'm a Republican", she had previously served as the President of the NYU College Republicans and was married to the grandson of Richard Nixon, Christopher Nixon Cox until their divorce in 2014. She stated after her election, that despite her being pro-life, she will toe the Manhattan Republican Party's platforms of being Pro-choice, pro-LGBTQ, and generally Socially Liberal.

On October 12, 2018, the party hosted Gavin McInnes, the founder of the Proud Boys and the co-founder of Vice at the Metropolitan Republican Club. The meeting would be met with protestors, and a fight broke out inside the club. The doors to the club where defaced with Circle-As and three people would be charged with assault.

Catsimatidis' party would feud with members of the New York Young Republican Club, who are mostly Millennials and pro-Trump Populists that are led by Gavin M. Wax, despite them having endorsed Catsimatidis for chairwoman. The more moderate leadership of the party led by Catsimatidis has sought to prevent them from appearing on the ballot for the 500-member borough committee. The party's leadership submitted a list of young republicans to a NYC judge arguing that they failed to qualify for the ballot due to residency requirements, and the judge agreed, removing their names from the ballot.

Despite their still small numbers compared to the Democrats, the Manhattan Republicans continue to grow, with more Republicans voting for Trump in 2020 United States presidential election than in the 2016 United States presidential election and with Curtis Sliwa performing the best out of any Republican mayoral candidate since Bloomberg in 2009. In the wake of the January 6 United States Capitol attack, the Manhattan Republican Party, in a joint statement with the Queens County Republican Party and Bronx GOP, decried the attack, with Chairwoman Catsimatidis stating that "All riots are bad. We condemn any violence regardless of who perpetrates it and what their political affiliations are." However, Catsimatidis also claimed that the attack was instigated and performed by Antifa actors.

In June 2021, the party held a fundraiser and hosted various hopeful candidates from the 2024 Republican Party presidential primaries including Mike Pompeo, Marco Rubio (who both would decline to run), Tim Scott, and Ron DeSantis.

During the early days of the 2025 New York City mayoral election incumbent mayor Eric Adams, who had been elected as a Democrat, met with the leadership of the Manhattan Republican Party about the possibility of securing the Republican nomination as well as separately meeting with the leadership of the Bronx GOP. Following significant backlash from his voter base Adams did not pursue the relationship further, and ultimately opted to run as an independent before dropping out all together. The party instead endorsed Curtis Sliwa, the Republican nominee who ultimately got just 7.1% of the vote.

== Current elected officials ==
As of 2023, the Manhattan Republican Party has no elected officials in the New York Senate, New York House of Representatives, Mayor of New York, or New York City Council. As of 2023 there are only 106,000 registered Republicans in the Borough to the Democrats 878,000.

Edgar J. Nathan was the last Republican to hold the office of Manhattan Borough president, doing so from 1942 to 1945.

== Affiliates ==
The Metropolitan Republican Club, located at 122 E 83rd St, was founded in 1902 by Reformist Roosevelt Republicans, but transformed into a center for more conservative members of the party to meet and host talks. The club is frequently used by the Manhattan Republican Party to host speakers, and also to meet with party leadership and voters.

The New York Young Republican Club was founded in 1856 as the New York Young Men's Republican Union, but the current iteration of the organization was founded in 1911 and incorporated in 1912. The club is the oldest and largest chapter of the Young Republicans and has had hundreds of its alumni go on to be elected to public office. The group has slowly developed a more conservative and populist strain, drifting from its Rockefeller Republican and Moderate Republican roots, becoming strong and vocal supporters of President Donald J. Trump. The club has been led by Gavin M. Wax, its 76th president, since April 2019.

The Gertrude & Morrison Parker West Side Republican Club, located at 50 West 72nd Street, was founded in 1898 as the West Side Republican Club and is the official Republican club for the 67th and 75th Assembly districts representing the Upper West Side. In 2002 it was renamed in memory of longtime president and community leader, Morrison Parker, and his wife and longtime club secretary Gertrude.

The Midtown Republican Club (formerly the Vincent F. Albano Republican Club) is the official Republican club for the 74th Assembly District and was founded by Vincent F. Albano, who served as its first president, prior to his election as party chairman. After Albano's death the club would be renamed in his memory. The neighborhoods represented by the club include Stuyvesant Town, Peter Cooper Village, Waterside Plaza, Alphabet City, Tudor City, Kips Bay, Turtle Bay, the East Village and portions of the Lower East Side.

The Knickerbocker Republican Club was founded in 1976 and is the official Republican club for the 76th Assembly district. The club has several famous alumni, including former Governor George Pataki, former mayors Rudy Giuliani and Ed Koch, New York State Comptroller Edward Regan, Congressmen Bill Green, and several assemblymen, councilmen and candidates for other offices, including Bret Schundler, two time candidate for Governor of New Jersey.

The Liberty Club is a Republican networking platform created by Andrea Catsimatidis for Republican donors to give back and connect those who funded local, state and national Republican campaign throughout New York City and Palm Beach, Florida. The group promotes electoral reform, outreach and community engagement, and branding for local candidates and party affiliates.

== See also ==
- Kings County Republican Party
- Queens County Republican Party
- Bronx Republican Party
- Staten Island Republican Party
- New York Republican State Committee
