= Joseph J. Savino =

American lawyer

Joseph James Savino, (commonly known as Jay Savino), is a disbarred lawyer and former chairman of the Republican Party in the Bronx, New York City. In 2006, he ran for the New York State Senate in the 34th district (which covers the Bronx and a part of Westchester County), but was defeated by the Democratic incumbent, State Senator Jeffrey D. Klein.

== Biography ==
Jay Savino's father was Joseph Savino Jr., the last Republican member of the New York City Council from the Bronx and a failed State Senate candidate. Joseph Savino would serve as the councilman at-large for the Bronx from 1977 to 1983, when a federal court ruled the office unconstitutional.

The Savino family would live in Morris Park, but spend most of their summers and winters at City Island.

Savino earned his Bachelor of Arts degree from Iona College and his Juris Doctor from the City University of New York.

He practiced in numerous areas of the law. In 1996, he worked for the Bronx Torts division of the Corporation Counsel and in 1998, he joined the New York State Senate as counsel and deputy chief of staff to then senior State Senator Guy J. Velella.

In 2000, he joined the Bronx Republican Party's Law Committee. In 2003, he was elected District Leader in the 80th Assembly District. In 2004, he was appointed by the chairman of the Bronx Republican Party to serve as Bronx Republican Commissioner for the New York City Board of Elections.

In 2005, Savino was elected Chairman of the Bronx County Republican Committee, and in 2008, he was elected 2nd Vice Chairman of the New York State Republican Party.

Savino is a past president and a member of the Morris Park Kiwanis. He also served as recording secretary and counsel for the Bronx Columbus Day Parades Committee, as a long-standing member of the Throggs Neck Volunteer Ambulance Corps Board of Directors, and on the T.N.V.A.C. Advisory Board.

He also served as an honorary member of the Bronx Fire Patrol, and was honored by community organizations including the Morris Park Community Association, Van Nest and Bronxchester Little Leagues, and Kiwanis International.

Savino was a partner in the law firm Faga Savino, L.L.P.

== Criminal charges, guilty plea, and sentence ==
On April 2, 2013, along with New York State Senator Malcolm Smith (D), New York City Councilman Dan Halloran (R), Queens Republican Party Vice Chairman Vincent Tabone, Spring Valley Mayor Noramie Jasmin, and Spring Valley Deputy Mayor Joseph Desmaret, Savino was arrested on corruption charges alleging that he accepted bribes in a complex scheme related to fixing the Republican nomination for the Mayor of New York City. He pleaded guilty to three counts of bribery on November 12, 2013, in Federal District Court in White Plains. Because he pleaded guilty, he avoided jail time and was sentenced to two years of probation.

He was disbarred effective November 12, 2013.
