= William Brookfield =

William Brookfield may refer to:

- William Henry Brookfield (1809–1874), Anglican priest
- William Brookfield (politician) (1844–1903), American businessman and politician from New York
