= Kings County Republican Party =

Affiliate of the Republican Party in New York City

- Ideology: Conservatism
- National affiliation: Republican Party
- Regional affiliation: New York Republican State Committee
- Colors: Red
- New York State Assembly (Brooklyn Seats): 4 / 21
- New York State Senate (Brooklyn Seats): 1 / 10
- Citywide Executive Offices: 0 / 5
- New York City Council (Brooklyn Seats): 2 / 15

Website
- bkgop.com

The Kings County Republican Party is a regional affiliate of the United States Republican Party for the borough of Brooklyn (coextensive with Kings County) in New York City, New York.

== Leadership ==
Like most county affiliates for the New York Republican State Committee, the Kings County Republican Party maintains a Kings County Republican Committee, with its chairman, selected by members of the committee, being the leader of the county's party.

== History ==
=== 2021 election ===
Despite a general pro-Republican uptick in the 2021 elections for both the city council and mayor, which saw two Republicans elected to the city council for Brooklyn. Party insurgents, led by executive director Stephen Maresca, claimed Chairman Ted Ghorra, who took power in 2016, led the party into near irrelevance in the borough, and for conditioning the party and its electorate to consistently lose elections. Despite this, Maresca would fail to unseat Ghorra during a party leadership election.

Shortly after the council election, incumbent Democrat Ari Kagan of the 47th District switched his party affiliation to Republican, stating that “I didn’t leave the Democratic Party. The Democratic Party left me.” Kagan cited the Democratic Party's soft on crime stance as the reason he switched, stating that the Democratic platform was damaging to the neighborhood he was representing. This has reflected a general tough on crime platform which has resulted in a steady growth in the Borough's Republican party since 2016.

=== 2022 election ===
Running a platform in line with gubernatorial candidate Lee Zeldin's views, the Kings County Republican party made serious inroads in the borough, increasing their share of the state assembly seats from a shared district with Staten Island, held by a member of the Staten Island Republican Party, to include 3 purely Brooklyn seats. The party and its platform were able to resonate with the Asian American population of South Brooklyn.

Lester Chang was the party's candidate in the 49th District. He ran on a tough on crime platform and was able to unseat the 35-year incumbent Peter J. Abbate Jr., winning the election by just 668 votes. Meanwhile, Alec Brook-Krasny defeated incumbent Mathylde Frontus in the 46th District by just 806 votes. The party did not see success in winning a seat in the New York Senate, their closest race was against incumbent Democrat Iwen Chu of the 17th District, who narrowly defeated her Republican challenger, Vito LaBella, with just 215 votes at the time of the race being called. Her margin would grow to be 534 after all the absentee ballots were counted.

There would be some drama around Chang after the election, as the Brooklyn Democratic party claimed he had been secretly living in Manhattan and was ineligible to run for the district he won. The speaker of the Assembly, the Democrat Carl Heastie organized an investigation which concluded that Chang owned an apartment in Manhattan, but he had fulfilled all residency requirements to run in the 49th District.

These victories and tight races came despite Brooklyn reporting a record number of Democratic voters and was credited with winning Kathy Hochul a second term over Zeldin. The losses seriously damaged the morale of the Brooklyn Democratic Party, whose "reformer" wing, which focused on increasing voter turnout, was pinned for the blame in the newly purple districts. Local Democratic activists noted that the Republicans had used campaign vans banners and extensive canvassing organized by the Kings County Republican Party, while the Brooklyn Democratic Party did little to nothing to help their candidates.

=== 2023 election ===
The New York Times reported that Asian Americans are shifting towards the Republican party, citing the Brooklyn Republican Party as an example. In Brooklyn's Chinatowns in 2016, the Democratic Party received 79% of the vote, while in the 2022 gubernatorial election, they received just 64% of the vote. This has resulted in a number of seats suddenly becoming competitive for the Republicans in southern Brooklyn, which they took advantage of in the 2022 assembly election, and seek to also take advantage of in the 2023 New York City Council election. Additionally the New York Magazine reported that the Republicans likely have more opportunities in the 2023 election, due to an additional shift towards Republicans among the boroughs Hasidic and Orthodox Jews and that there could be upwards of 6 Republican city council seats in Brooklyn after the election. While the Brooklyn Eagle also noted an uptick in Republicans among the borough's Russian American population and also attributed a large portion of the party's success to its "common sense policies", and keeping former President Donald Trump at a healthy distance, neither endorsing nor opposing him, much to the dismay of the local chapter of the New York Conservative Party, which has refused to endorse any Republican candidates in the borough since 2016.

For the 2023 election, the district map was re-drawn to better accommodate population. As such, incumbent Democrat Justin Brannan of the 43rd District had his district redrawn to no longer include his home. As such he stated he will be challenging incumbent Republican Ari Kagan in the 47th District. The now predominately Asian-American 43rd District, which is in the recently Republican 49th Assembly District, has had Brannan make accusations that two of the three Democratic candidates in the primaries are also secretly running for the Republican line to be on a Fusion ticket. Both candidates denied this, stating that Brannan was fearmongering. In the 43rd District, the party is running Vito LaBella, who lost to State Senator Iwen Chu in 2022. During his campaign footage of LaBella surfaced where he declared that he despises Brooklyn, in a profanity laden tirade against the city and its COVID-19 lockdowns. The video resulted in LaBella slumping heavily in polls, receive several calls by community leaders to drop out, and caused Chairman Ted Ghorra to urge him to backtrack. Additionally, Republican community leaders in the district are unhappy with the county committee for selecting LaBella instead of one of the Asian-American district leaders to run for the office.

Despite switching to the Republicans in 2022, Kagan has been met with less than enthusiastic support from the borough's Republicans, due to his longtime association with the Democrats. As such, he is facing a healthy primary with two candidates, Anna Belfiore-Delfaus who largely has the support of the Kings County Republican Committee, and Avery Pereira, a local community organizer. All three of them are running a tough on crime platform. Kagan won the Republican primary by a comfortable margin but lost in the November general election to Justin Brannan.

== Current elected officials ==
In the New York State Senate:

- Steve Chan from 17th District since 2025

In the New York State Assembly:

- Michael Tannousis from the 64th District since 2021 (includes part of Staten Island)
- Lester Chang from the 49th District since 2023
- Alec Brook-Krasny from the 46th District since 2023 (previously served from 2006 to 2015)
- Michael Novakhov from the 45th District since 2023

In the New York City Council:

- Inna Vernikov from the 48th District since 2021
- David Carr from the 50th District since 2021 (includes part of Staten Island)

The only Republican borough President of Brooklyn was Lewis H. Pounds from 1914 to 1917, doing so on a Fusion ticket with the Democrats.

== See also ==
- Bronx Republican Party
- Queens County Republican Party
- Manhattan Republican Party
- Staten Island Republican Party
- New York Republican State Committee
