= Vincent F. Albano Jr. Playground =

Public park in Manhattan, New York

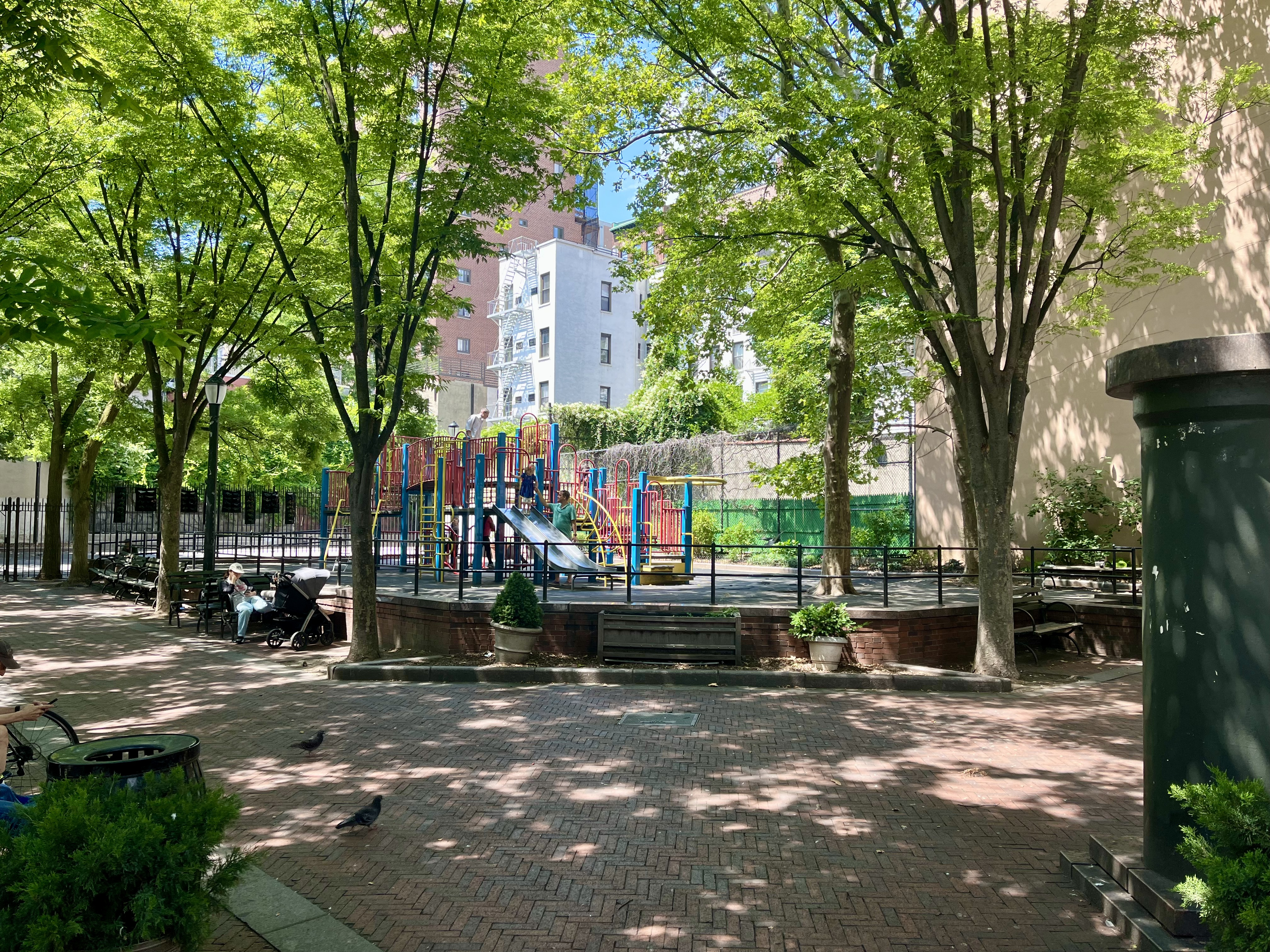
- Vincent F. Albano Jr. Playground in 2023
- Interactive map of Vincent F. Albano Jr. Playground
- Type: Urban park
- Location: Kips Bay, Manhattan, New York City
- Coordinates: 40°44′31″N 73°58′42″W
- Area: 0.35 acres (0.14 ha)
- Opened: July 21, 1967
- Owner: MTA Bridges and Tunnels
- Operator: New York City Department of Parks and Recreation

Vincent F. Albano Jr. Playground is a 0.35-acre (0.14 ha) public park in the Kips Bay neighborhood of Manhattan, New York City. Located at the northwest corner of Second Avenue and East 29th Street, the property was originally acquired by the Triborough Bridge and Tunnel Authority in 1965 as right-of-way to construct the proposed Mid-Manhattan Expressway. The land was leased to the city for use as an interim park, which opened in 1967. Although the proposed highway project was officially cancelled in 1971, the land used by the playground is still owned by MTA Bridges and Tunnels.

== History ==
=== Property acquisition ===
On December 22, 1965, the Triborough Bridge and Tunnel Authority (TBTA) announced that it had purchased a $1 million parcel of land at the northwest corner of Second Avenue and East 29th Street as right-of-way that would be needed to construct the proposed Mid-Manhattan Expressway. The proposed expressway consisted of an elevated highway that would primarily run along the south side of 30th Street in Midtown, providing connections between the Queens–Midtown Tunnel and the FDR Drive on the east side of Manhattan and the Lincoln Tunnel and the Miller Highway on the west side of Manhattan. The plans for the highway also included entrance and exit ramps to provide access within Manhattan.

Although the Mid-Manhattan Expressway was a highly controversial project that had not yet been approved, the property was purchased by the TBTA from Rose Associates because the real estate developers were just beginning construction of a 20-story residential building on the site and the authority wanted to avoid incurring higher condemnation costs later on if the high-rise building was completed and the highway was approved. Rose Associates had already demolished the existing tenements on the site and excavated the basement for the planned residential apartments. The specific plot of land at East 29th Street was acquired by the TBTA to permit the construction of an eastbound exit ramp from the proposed expressway to Second Avenue.

While the plans for the Mid-Manhattan Expressway were submitted to the Board of Estimate in 1959, they had not been acted on by Mayor Robert F. Wagner Jr. and were also opposed by Traffic Commissioner Henry Barnes, Manhattan Borough President Edward R. Dudley and other civic groups. Despite the lack of action and the controversial nature of the project, the TBTA had confidence that the proposed highway could win the support of the incoming administration of Mayor-elect John Lindsay. The authority also did not feel that there was much risk in acquiring the land at East 29th Street because the property could likely be resold at a profit in the event that the plans for the highway were canceled.

The day after the property acquisition was announced by the TBTA, a spokesman for the Mayor-elect indicated that the land purchase had angered Lindsay, who felt it was an attempt to test the incoming administration, and announced he was also opposed to the proposed highway, which was a pet project of TBTA chairman Robert Moses. While Moses was serving as the Mayor's representative on arterial highways based on a memorandum of understanding with Mayor Wagner and the State Department of Public Works, experts felt that Lindsay could choose to remove Moses from the arterial highway post after he took office. The TBTA's announcement also caught the attention of two state legislators, Assemblyman Paul J. Curran and Senator Whitney N. Seymour Jr., who introduced a bill to block the authority from spending allocating funds for highway planning in New York City without consulting with the City Planning Commission.

The proposed Mid-Manhattan Expressway had been previously tied by the TBTA to a plan to add a third tube to the Queens–Midtown Tunnel, and Moses had indicated that new expressway approaches to the tunnel were essential to making the new tube feasible. However, on December 28, 1965, the TBTA announced that the third tube could be constructed without the completion of the new expressway approaches, which included the Mid-Manhattan Expressway as well as the Bushwick Expressway. According to The New York Times, this decision was viewed as an unspoken admission by Moses that the approval could not be obtained for the proposed expressways. The Mid-Manhattan Expressway project was officially canceled by New York Governor Nelson Rockefeller in 1971.

=== Establishment of park ===
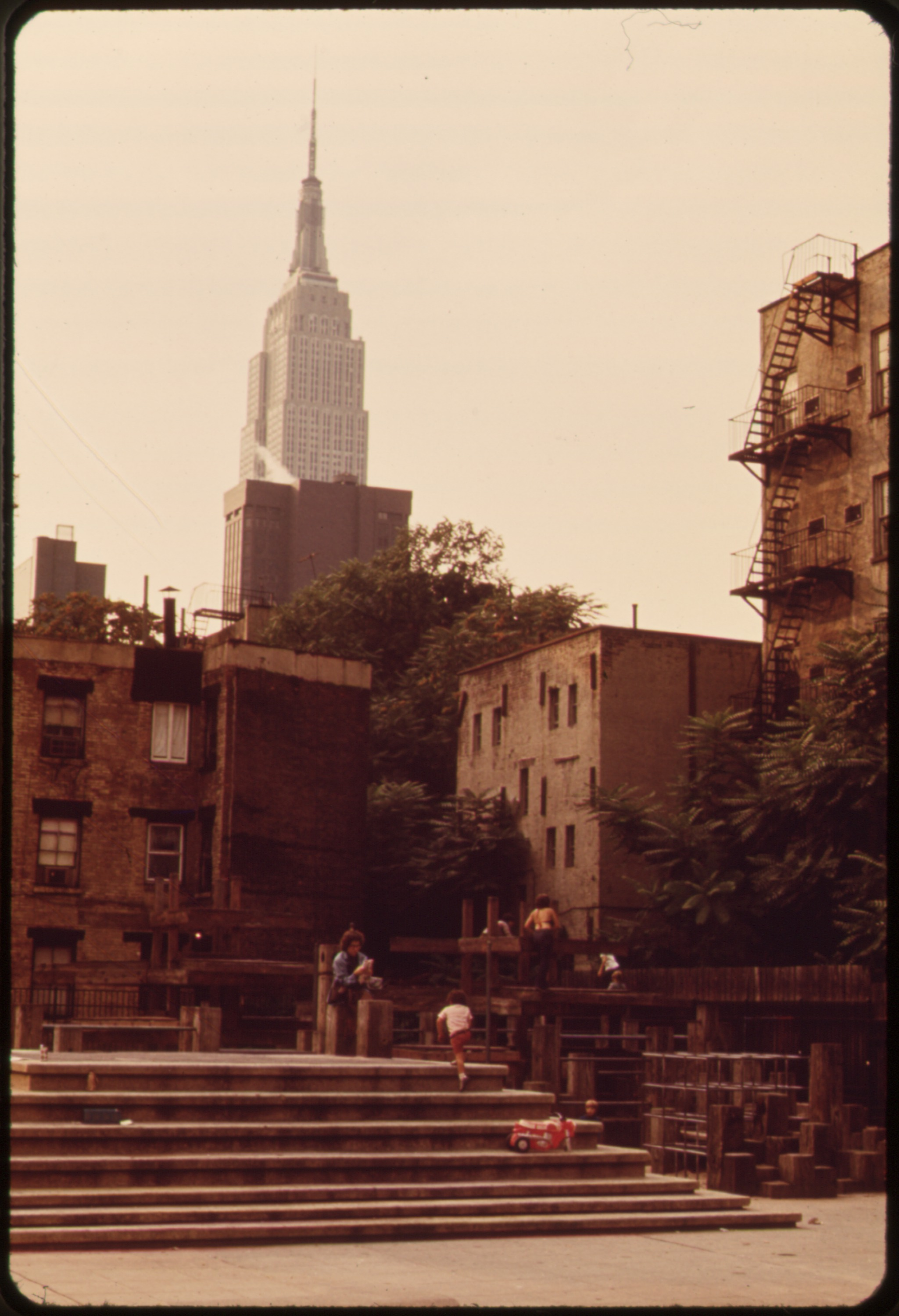
Stepped concrete forms physically enclosed the play area in 1973

The TBTA had originally planned to use the site as a temporary parking lot while it awaited approval for the proposed Mid-Manhattan Expressway project. However, the announcement of the TBTA's acquisition of land for the proposed highway project also caught the attention of Thomas P. F. Hoving, whom Mayor-elect Lindsay had appointed to serve as Parks Commissioner in the incoming administration. Hoving spoke with Robert Moses and proposed that the land be used as a park before the expressway was built. Moses commended the idea and agreed to fill in the property and erect a fence around it for use as a temporary park. During the brief period he served as the city's Parks Commissioner, Hoving became a champion of developing pocket parks—small parks generally smaller than 1 acre (0.40 ha) in size. He established a Bureau of Vest Pocket Parks within the Parks Department to facilitate the development of new public and private pocket parks; nine such pocket parks would open in New York City in 1967.

In January 1966, the TBTA and The New York Community Trust each contributed a gift of $25,000 to create an experimental children's park at the site. Landscape architect M. Paul Friedberg designed a playground for the new park with the input of area residents and local organizations under the umbrella of the East Midtown Conservation and Development Corporation. The land was leased by the TBTA to the Parks Department for $1 a year with the provision that the playground could be dismantled quickly.

The new park opened the following year and was dedicated by Mayor Lindsay and Parks Commissioner August Heckscher at a ceremony held on July 21, 1967. The total cost of the park was $78,500, with $25,000 having been contributed by the New York Community Trust and the balance coming from the TBTA. The park was designed to include a raised seating area facing Second Avenue with benches shaded by wooden trellises and trees, a snack bar, and a comfort station. The western end of the park had an active play area covered in sand with a climbing facility, pipe slides, see-saws, spring pads, and tire swings that was adjacent to a large asphalt area painted with street games. The only fences in the park were located at the rear of the facility next to the adjacent properties; the play area was physically enclosed with stepped concrete forms, one of which had integrated slides, to avoid it from appearing to be "caged" in. A depressed wading pool with a fountain and spray heads was located in the center of the park, between the raised seating area and the active play area.

=== Naming and renovations ===
In 1989, the park was named after Vincent F. Albano Jr. as a result of legislation introduced by Carol Greitzer, the council member representing the area the park was located in. The naming was approved by the New York City Council and signed into law by Mayor Ed Koch on October 10, 1989. Albano had served as the chairman of the New York County Republican Committee from 1962 until his death in 1981 and was a political mentor of Mayor Lindsay. He also had lived in the neighborhood and had helped to preserve the playground. Although the park was not officially named when it opened in 1967, it had been informally known as the "Nathan Straus Playground" after the philanthropist Nathan Straus. The New York City Housing Authority's Straus Houses are located on the west side of Second Avenue between East 27th and 28th streets, two blocks to the south of the park.

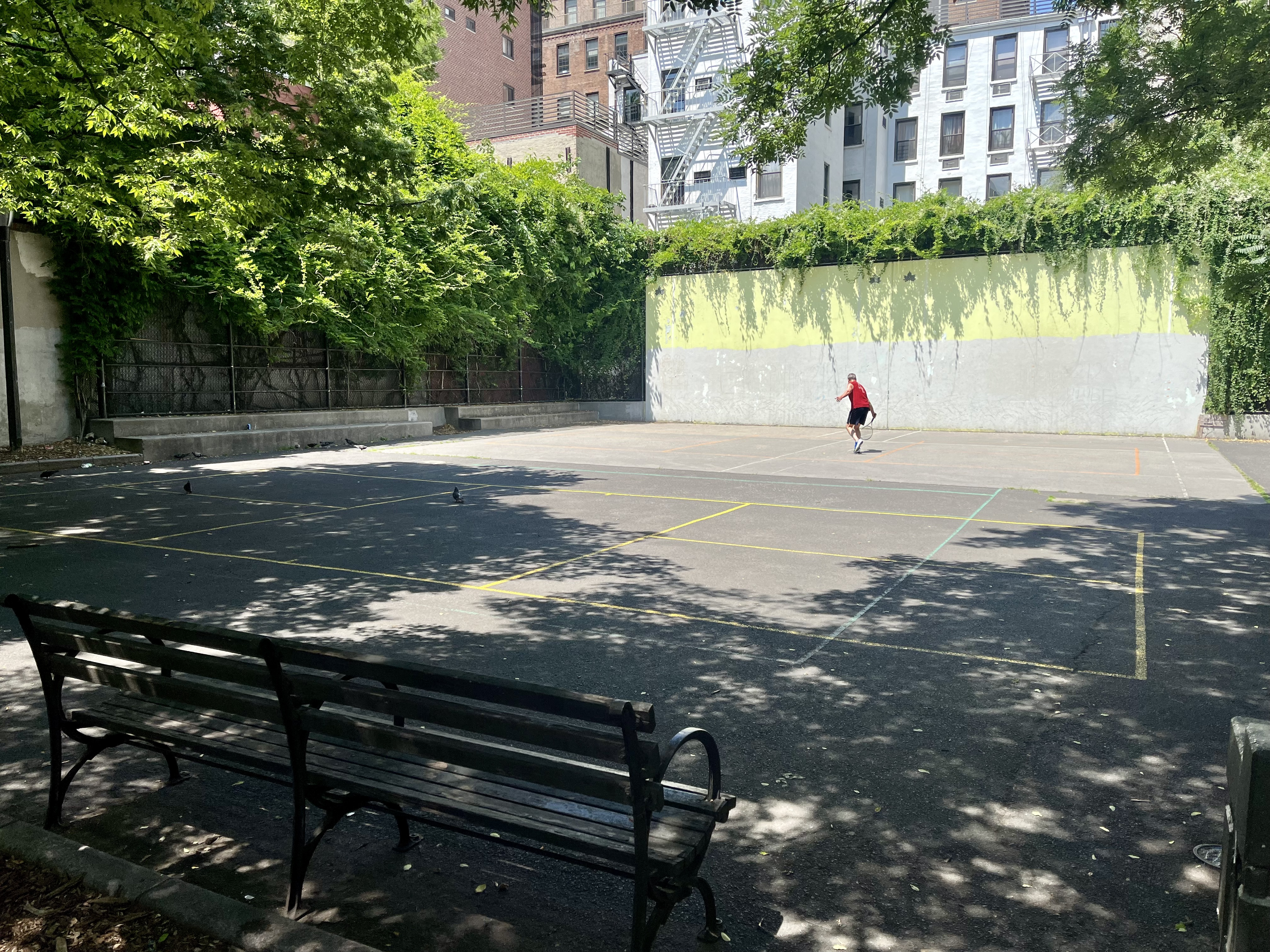
Handball courts were added to the park in 1998

The naming of the park in 1989 also coincided with the completion of a $722,000 renovation of the site, which included the addition of an ADA-accessible play area, new game tables and benches, an information kiosk, and ornamental steel fencing. Further upgrades to the playground were made in 1998 including the installation of new playground equipment with safety surfacing and handball courts. In 1999, the play area was named the "Mary Collins Playscape" in recognition of a local community activist who had died in 1997 and dedicated her efforts to improving the park. Collins headed the Lexington East Twenties Society, an organization that was involved in the 1996 "Take Back Albano Park" initiative and also donated funds for programming activities at the park to bring more parents and children to the playground and prevent the space from being overrun by loiterers. The park has continued to face problems of strangers who loiter in the park, including homeless individuals from a nearby shelter. In 2015, signs were installed around the children's playground, restricting the area from adults unaccompanied by children.

The park was renovated again between November 2023 and October 2024; the project involved the installation of new playground equipment with safety surfacing, an asphalt play area, a new spray shower, and reconstruction of the handball courts. A ribbon-cutting ceremony to mark the completion of the park's reconstruction was held on December 20, 2024, which was attended by council member Carlina Rivera, Manhattan Borough President Mark Levine, and New York State senator Kristen Gonzalez. A complexity in performing renovations at the park is that the property is still owned by MTA Bridges and Tunnels, which requires the Parks Department to obtain an agreement from the MTA for the work to proceed.
