= Roy M. Goodman =

American politician

Roy Goodman
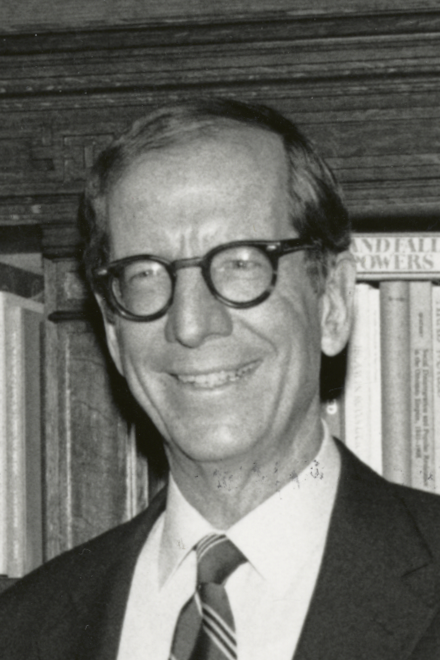

Member of the New York State Senate from the 26th district
- In office January 1, 1969 – January 10, 2002
- Preceded by: Whitney North Seymour Jr.
- Succeeded by: Liz Krueger

Personal details
- Born: Roy Matz Goodman; March 5, 1930 New York City, U.S.
- Died: June 3, 2014 (aged 84) Danbury, Connecticut, U.S.
- Party: Republican
- Spouse: Barbara Furrer (m. 1955; died 2006)
- Relations: Israel Matz (grandfather)
- Children: 3
- Education: Harvard University (AB, MBA)

Roy Matz Goodman (March 5, 1930 – June 3, 2014) was an American politician and businessman who served as a member of the New York State Senate from 1969 to 2002. He was the Republican nominee in the 1977 New York City mayoral election, receiving 4.08% of the vote.

== Early life and education ==
Goodman was born in New York City on March 5, 1930. He was the grandson of Israel Matz, the founder of the Ex-Lax company. As a child, he attended Camp Androscoggin. Goodman received an undergraduate degree from Harvard University in 1951 and an M.B.A. from Harvard Business School in 1953.

== Political career ==
Prior to serving in the Senate, Goodman was the New York City Director of Finance under Mayor John Lindsay in 1966 and 1967. He served as chairman of the New York County Republican Committee from 1981 to 2001. He ran for the New York State Assembly in 1964, but lost the Republican nomination to Bill Green.

=== State senator ===
In 1968, Goodman was elected to the New York State Senate for District 26 on Manhattan's East Side (later District 28). He would serve for 34 years, in the 178th through 194th New York legislatures, until his retirement in 2002.

He served as Chairman of the Senate Committee on Investigations, Taxation and Government Operations. He was considered a leader of the liberal Rockefeller wing of the New York State Republican Party. Goodman's supporters would sometimes refer to him as "The Statesman of the State Senate."

In 1977, Goodman ran for Mayor of New York City. He defeated Barry Farber, a talk radio host in the Republican primary. In the general election, Goodman finished third behind Democratic Congressman Edward I. Koch and New York Secretary of State Mario Cuomo, a Democrat who ran on the Liberal Party ticket.

Goodman was nearly defeated in 2000 by Liz Krueger. At first, Krueger was leading Goodman by several hundred votes. After a recount and the counting of the absentee ballots, Goodman was declared the winner in late December. In 2020, the New York Times reported that months after the election, in 2001, election workers discovered "hundreds of ballots" from a Krueger-leaning area in an air conditioning duct.

Goodman resigned from the State Senate in early 2002. As of 2026, he remains the last Republican elected to office in Manhattan.

=== Manhattan Republican chairman ===
In 1981, Goodman became chairman of the New York County (Manhattan) Republican Party. In Goodman's first decade as county chairman, the only other Republican elected official in Manhattan was liberal U.S. Representative Bill Green, who represented the Upper East Side.

Goodman's tenure in the 1990s witnessed the expansion and then the contraction of the Republican Party in Manhattan. In 1990, Republican John Ravitz was elected to the New York State Assembly. In 1991, Charles Millard was elected to the New York City Council. In 1993, Andrew Eristoff also won election to the Council. In 1992, Bill Green was ousted by Carolyn Maloney, who served in congress until her defeat in the Democratic Primary in 2022 to Jerrold Nadler. Millard attempted to win back the seat for Republicans in 1994, but he was soundly defeated. Both Millard and Eristoff eventually left the City Council, and their seats were won by Democrats. Ravitz remained in office until 2002, when he lost the special election to succeed Goodman in the Senate to Liz Krueger. He did not seek re-election to the Assembly.

=== Role in the 1990 gubernatorial election ===
Goodman is notorious among New York Republicans for his role in picking Pierre Rinfret as the Republican candidate for governor in 1990. Republicans had difficulty finding anyone to run against incumbent Democrat Mario Cuomo, who was considered unbeatable. Goodman checked his Rolodex and found Rinfret, whom he knew socially. Goodman picked Rinfret because he was pro-choice on abortion and, as a millionaire economist, could spend some of his own money on the campaign.

On election Day, Rinfret received about 21 percent of the vote and barely outpolled Herbert London, the candidate of the Conservative Party of New York State.

== Other activities ==
Goodman was a Fellow For Life of the Metropolitan Museum of Art, a patron of the Metropolitan Opera, a Patron of the New York Philharmonic Society, president of the Goodman Family Foundation, and a member of the Council on Foreign Relations. He served on the United States Commission of Fine Arts from 1985 to 1989.

== Personal life ==
Goodman married Barbara Furrer in 1955; they had three children and were married until her death in 2006.

Goodman died from respiratory failure at a hospital in Danbury, Connecticut, on June 3, 2014, aged 84. He had fallen ill while traveling home to New York from Harvard Business School in Massachusetts, where he had attended graduation ceremonies for one of his grandchildren.

== Notes ==
New York State Senate
Preceded by Whitney North Seymour Jr.	Member of the New York State Senate from the 26th district 1969–2002	Succeeded by Liz Krueger
Party political offices
Preceded by John J. Marchi; 1973	Republican nominee for Mayor of New York City; 1977	Succeeded by Ed Koch; 1981
