= Green Bank, New Jersey =

Place in Burlington County, New Jersey, United States

- Unincorporated community
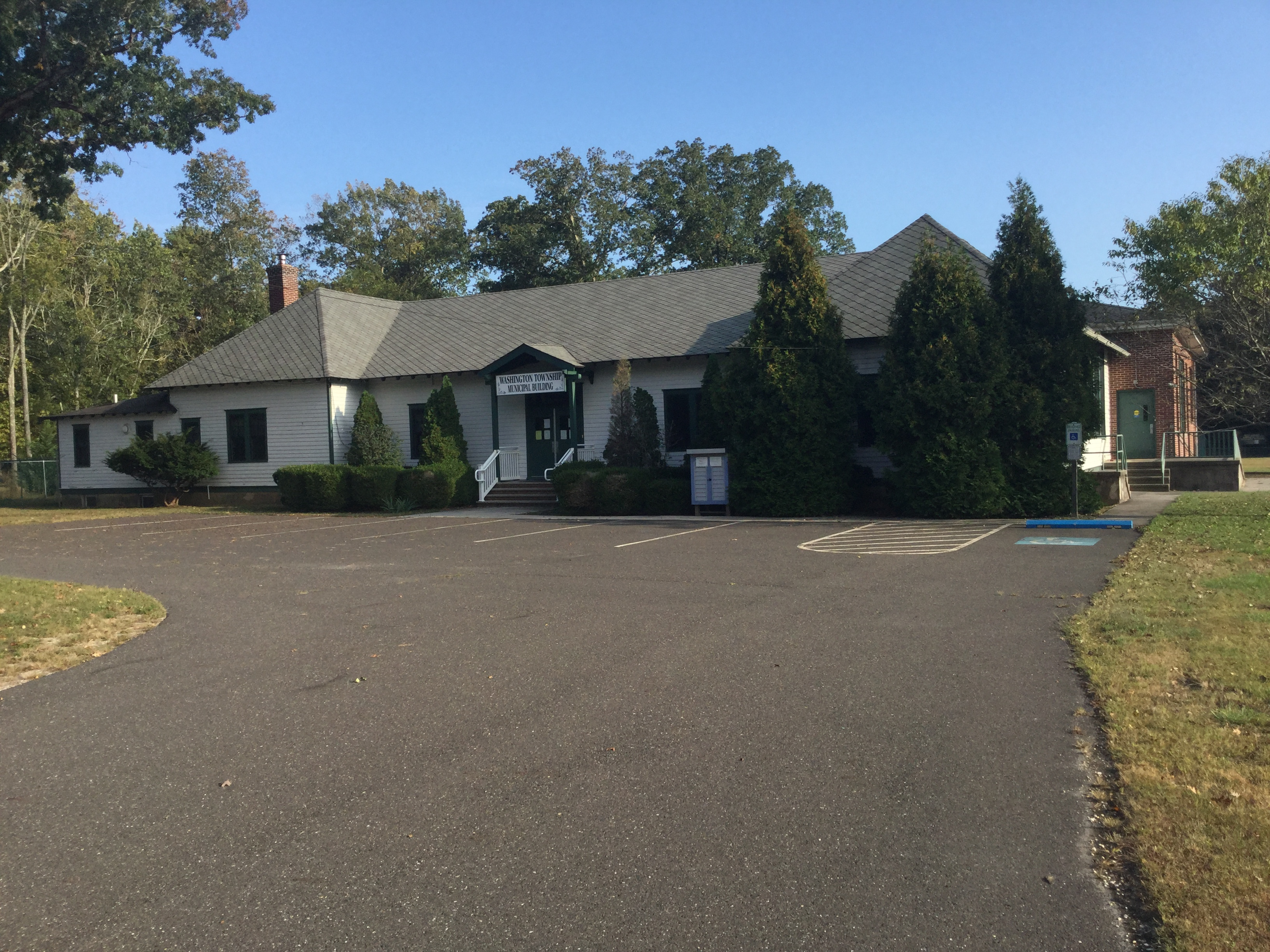
- The old Green Bank School

- Green Bank's location in Burlington County (Inset: Burlington County in New Jersey) Green; Bank (New Jersey) Green; Bank (the United States)
- Coordinates: 39°36′46″N 74°35′17″W
- Country: United States
- State: New Jersey
- County: Burlington
- Township: Washington
- Elevation: 9.8 ft (3 m)
- GNIS feature ID: 876763

Green Bank is an unincorporated community located within Washington Township, in Burlington County, New Jersey, United States. It is located on the Mullica River.

In the 19th century, Green Bank was important to the economy of Washington Township: it held one of the township's main sawmills, it functioned as a port from which the township's lumber was shipped down the Mullica River to the Atlantic Ocean, and when shipbuilding became an important industry in the township in the late 19th century, many ships were built at Green Bank.

== Education ==
Children in Green Bank formerly attended a school within the town as part of Washington Township's school district; this school, built in 1919, is on the state Register of Historic Places and is currently used as the township's town hall, having been replaced with a larger school building next door in 2006. The decision to replace the old school was controversial due to the small number of students attending it, and in fall 2010 the new school closed as an agreement with Mullica Township allowed elementary and middle school students to attend its schools. As of 2021, students from Green Bank, like those from all of Washington Township, attend elementary and middle school in the Mullica Township Schools and high school in Cedar Creek High School in Egg Harbor City.

== Notable people ==
People who were born in, residents of, or otherwise closely associated with Green Bank include:

- William Brookfield (1844–1903), businessman and politician from New York.
- Kathleen Crowley (1929–2017), actress.
