= 1977 New York City mayoral election =

- November 8, 1977
- Registered: 2,887,530
- Turnout: 1,486,536; 51.48% (▲1.27 pp)
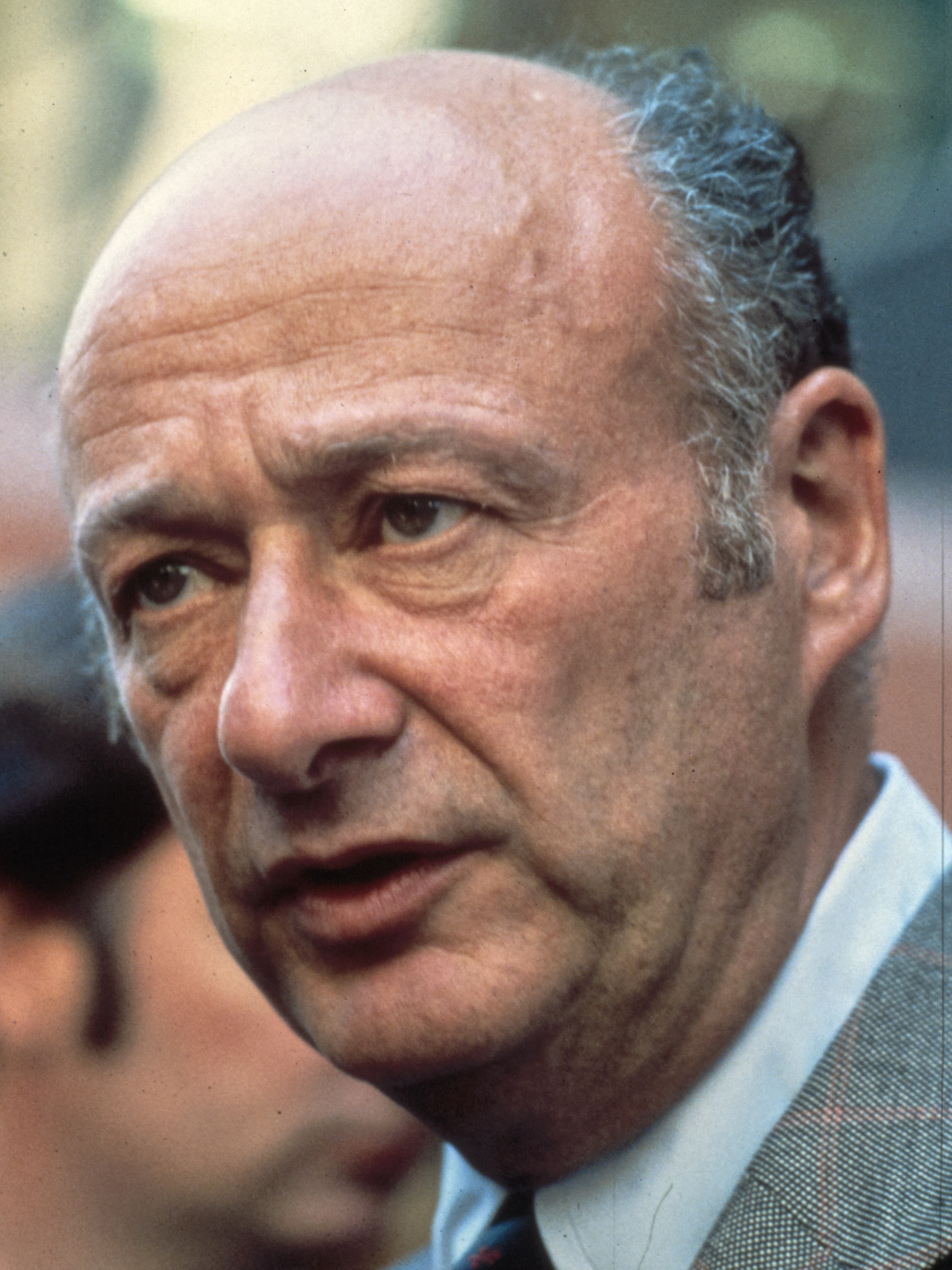

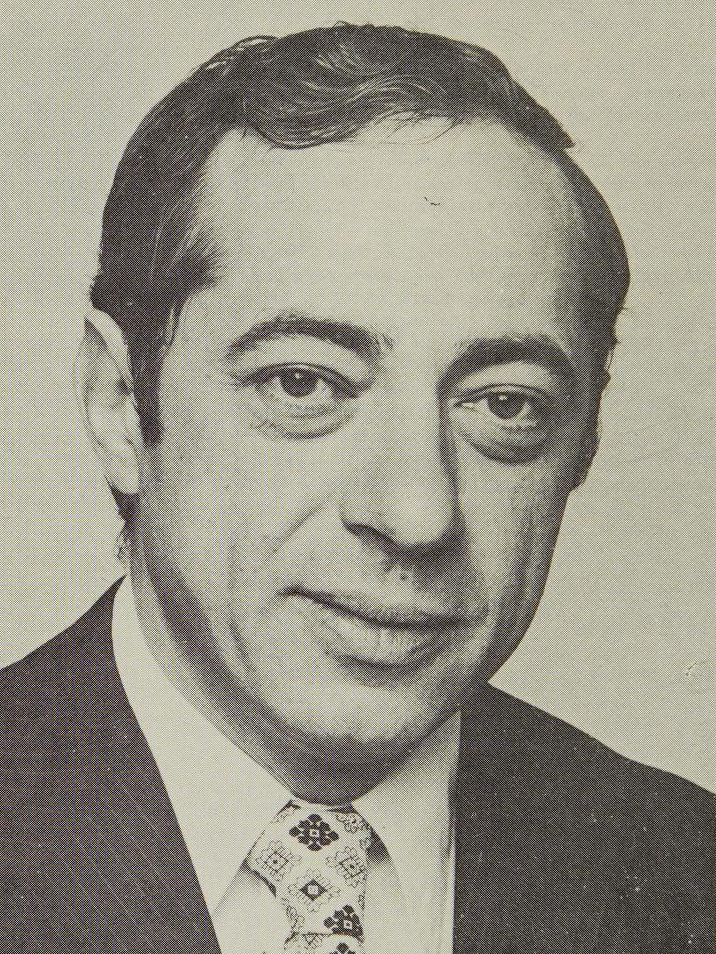
Candidate	Ed Koch	Mario Cuomo
Party	Democratic	Liberal
Alliance		Neighborhood Preservation
Popular vote	717,376	587,913
Percentage	50.0%	41.0%
- Borough results Koch: 40–50% 50–60% 60–70% Cuomo: 40–50% 60–70%
Mayor before election
Abraham Beame
Democratic
Elected Mayor
Ed Koch
Democratic

The 1977 New York City mayoral election occurred on Tuesday, November 8, 1977. U.S. Representative Ed Koch defeated Secretary of State Mario Cuomo in both the Democratic Party primary and the general election, with Cuomo running on the Liberal Party ticket.

In the Democratic primary on September 8, incumbent mayor Abraham Beame was challenged by five other Democrats, including Representative Ed Koch, New York Secretary of State Mario Cuomo, and feminist activist and former Representative Bella Abzug. In the initial primary, Koch had a narrow lead over the field despite carrying none of New York's five boroughs and only 19.8% of the popular vote. Because no candidate received over forty percent of the vote, a runoff vote was held between Koch and Cuomo, who had already won the Liberal Party nomination. Koch defeated Cuomo by winning narrow victories in every borough but Queens and Staten Island.

In the general election, which Cuomo decided to contest on the Liberal ticket, Koch was again victorious, coming within a few hundred votes of an outright majority. To date, this is the last election where the winner did not receive a majority of the vote. Republican Roy M. Goodman and Conservative Barry Farber finished a distant third and fourth, respectively.

== Background ==
In October 1975, with the city on the verge of bankruptcy, Mayor Beame asked the federal government for a bailout. President Gerald Ford refused, leading to the memorable New York Daily News headline: "Ford to City: Drop Dead". As a result, Mayor Beame laid off many police officers and other city employees, which was followed by an increase in crime. (The next month, Ford relented in part, signing the New York City Seasonal Financing Act of 1975, which extended $2.3 billion in federal loans to the city for three years.)

A 982-page report from the Securities and Exchange Commission blamed Beame's mismanagement for the city's financial mess, which his opponents seized on as an electoral issue. Beame's struggles with the economy and crime, which had led to a decrease in the population of New York City, encouraged several Democrats to challenge him.

== Liberal Party convention ==
The Liberal Party convention was held on May 19, 1977. Cuomo defeated Abzug for the nomination.

=== Results ===
1977 Liberal convention
Party	Candidate	Votes	%
Liberal	Mario Cuomo	238	95.20%
Liberal	Abstention	7	2.80%
Liberal	Bella Abzug	5	2.00%
Majority		231	92.40
Total votes		250	100.00%

== Democratic primary ==
The Democratic primary was held on September 8, 1977.

=== Candidates ===
- Bella Abzug, former U.S. Representative from the West Side and candidate for U.S. Senate in 1976
- Herman Badillo, U.S. Representative from the South Bronx
- Abraham Beame, incumbent Mayor of New York City
- Mario Cuomo, Secretary of State of New York
- Joel Harnett, civic watchdog
- Ed Koch, U.S. Representative from Greenwich Village
- Percy Sutton, Manhattan Borough President

==== Withdrew ====
- Edward N. Costikyan, reformer, attorney, and Beame's 1965 campaign manager (endorsed Koch)

Abzug represented parts of Manhattan and the Bronx in the U.S. House. In 1975, she left her seat to run for the U.S. Senate but was narrowly defeated in the Democratic primary by Daniel Patrick Moynihan.

Cuomo, a liberal from Queens, had been appointed Secretary of State by Governor Hugh Carey in 1976, after losing the election for lieutenant governor in 1974.

Ed Koch, a Jewish politician from Greenwich Village, began his career as "just a plain liberal," but shifted rightward, towards being a "liberal with sanity".

=== Campaign ===
Koch ran to the right of the other candidates, on a "law and order" platform. A major blackout affected New York City from July 13, 1977 to July 14, 1977. The blackout was localized to New York City and the immediate surroundings, and resulted in citywide looting. According to historian Jonathan Mahler, the blackout and the subsequent rioting helped catapult Koch and his message of restoring public safety to front-runner status. Mayor Beame accused Con Edison, the power provider for New York City, of "gross negligence". Koch criticized Beame for losing control of the streets and failing to ask Governor Carey to call in the National Guard.

=== Endorsements ===
Bella Abzug

Individuals

- Shirley MacLaine, actress
- Marlo Thomas, actress

Labor unions

- Local 1199
- Marine Engineers Benevolent Association

Other organizations

- 10,000 hospital workers
Herman Badillo

Individuals

- Chita Rivera, actress
- Raul Julia, actor

Radio stations

- WCBS

Other organizations

- West Brooklyn Independent Democrats
- Several Hispanic labor organizations
Abraham Beame (incumbent)

State legislators

- Stanley Steingut, Speaker of the New York Assembly and Assemblyman from Brooklyn

City officials

- Donald Manes, Borough President of Queens

Individuals

- John DeLury, president
- Bert Powers, president of the New York Typographical Union No. 6 and leader of the 1962–1963 New York City newspaper strike

Labor unions

- Central Labor Council
- ILGWU
- United Federation of Teachers
- Transport Workers Union of America
Mario Cuomo

Federal executive branch officials

- Robert F. Wagner Jr., former U.S. Ambassador to Spain and mayor of New York City

Federal legislators

- Mario Biaggi, U.S. Representative from the Bronx and candidate for mayor in 1973

State executive branch officials

- Hugh Carey, Governor of New York

Newspapers

- The New York Times
- The Village Voice

Labor unions

- 26 labor organizations

Other organizations

- Liberal Party of New York
Joel Harnett

Individuals

- Don Pippin, stage actor
- Phil Newman, businessman
Ed Koch

Federal legislators

- Stephen J. Solarz

City officials

- Bess Myerson, former Commissioner of Consumer Affairs and Miss America 1945

Newspapers

- The New York Post
- New York Daily News

Other organizations

- Citizens Union
Percy Sutton

Federal executive branch officials

- Nicholas Katzenbach, former U.S. Attorney General and U.S. Undersecretary of State

Federal legislators

- Charles Rangel, U.S. Representative from Harlem

Other individuals

- Ellen Sulzberger Straus, philanthropist and businesswoman

Newspapers

- Amsterdam News
- New York Voice

Labor unions

- Allied Health Services Union

Other organizations

- Baptist Ministers Conference of Greater New York and Vicinity
- New York Ministerial Alliance

=== Polling ===
Poll source	Dates administered	Sample size	Bella Abzug	Herman Badillo	Abraham Beame	Mario Cuomo	Joel Hartnett	Ed Koch	Percy Sutton	Undecided	Declined
The New York Times/CBS News	August 13–20, 1977	1,327 RV	17%	7%	17%	14%	1%	12%	9%	18%	5%
The New York Times/CBS News	August 13–20, 1977	332 LV	21%	8%	21%	15%	1%	13%	8%	11%	2%

=== Results ===
1977 Democratic mayoral primary
Party	Candidate	Votes	%
Democratic	Ed Koch	180,248	19.81%
Democratic	Mario Cuomo	170,488	18.74%
Democratic	Abraham Beame (incumbent)	163,610	17.98%
Democratic	Bella Abzug	150,719	16.56%
Democratic	Percy Sutton	131,197	14.42%
Democratic	Herman Badillo	99,808	10.97%
Democratic	Joel Harnett	13,927	1.53%
Majority		9,760	1.0%
Total votes		909,997	100.00%

==== Results by borough ====
1977 Democratic Primary
	Manhattan	The Bronx	Brooklyn	Queens	Staten Island	Total
Edward I. Koch	50,806	23,453	49,470	52,002	5,812	181,544
Mario M. Cuomo	25,331	23,028	54,845	56,698	10,430	170,332
Abraham D. Beame	23,758	25,747	63,304	44,607	7,337	164,753
Bella Abzug	56,045	20,435	37,236	33,883	4,314	151,913
Percy Sutton	35,012	24,801	42,903	28,525	1,399	132,640
Herman Badillo	27,193	35,007	28,909	9,051	876	101,036

=== Democratic runoff campaign ===
As no candidate obtained the needed 40%, a runoff election was scheduled. The runoff election was held on September 19, 1977 between the top two vote getters, Koch and Cuomo.

=== Results ===
1977 Democratic mayoral primary runoff
Party	Candidate	Votes	%
Democratic	Ed Koch	431,849	54.94%
Democratic	Mario Cuomo	354,222	45.06%
Majority		77,627	9.88

Source: OurCampaigns.com

==== Democratic primary results by borough ====
1977 Democratic Primary Runoff
	Manhattan	The Bronx	Brooklyn	Queens	Staten Island	Total
Edward I. Koch	115,251	69,612	131,271	107,033	9,835	433,002
Mario M. Cuomo	61,570	55,355	112,587	105,522	19,799	354,833

== Republican primary ==
The Republican primary was held on September 8, 1977.

=== Candidates ===
- Barry Farber, talk radio host
- Roy M. Goodman, State Senator from Manhattan

=== Results ===
1977 Republican mayoral primary
Party	Candidate	Votes	%
Republican	Roy M. Goodman	44,667	56.22%
Republican	Barry Farber	34,782	43.78%
Majority		9,885	12.44

== General election ==
=== Candidates ===
- Vito P. Battista, former Republican Assemblyman from Brooklyn (United Taxpayers)
- Elijah C. Boyd (U.S. Labor)
- Mario Cuomo, Secretary of State of New York (Liberal)
- Barry Farber, talk radio host (Conservative)
- Catarino Garza (Socialist Workers)
- Roy M. Goodman, State Senator from Manhattan (Republican)
- Ed Koch, U.S. Representative from Greenwich Village (Democratic)
- William Lawry (Libertarian)
- Kenneth F. Newcombe (Communist)
- Louis P. Wein (Independence)

=== Campaign ===
Though Koch won the runoff convincingly, Cuomo remained in the race as the Liberal Party nominee.

Though Governor Carey had persuaded Cuomo to run for mayor in the first place, he threw his support to Koch and urged Cuomo to stand down for the sake of party unity. Cuomo refused.

While Koch had a reputation as a crusading reformer, that summer he quietly promised plum city jobs to the political powerbrokers in the boroughs in exchange for their support. Cuomo ran well to the left of Koch and ran on banning the death penalty, which backfired with New Yorkers during a time of high crime rates. Cuomo then went negative with ads that likened Koch to unpopular former mayor John Lindsay. His supporters used the inflammatory slogan "Vote for Cuomo, Not the Homo". Meanwhile, Koch backers accused Cuomo of anti-Semitism and pelted Cuomo campaign cars with eggs.

=== Polling ===
Poll Source	Dates Administered	Koch (D)	Cuomo (L)	Farber (C)	Goodman (R)
New York Post	November 1–3, 1977	49.5%	35.4%	3.6%	3.4%

=== Results ===
New York City Mayoral Election, November 8, 1977
Party	Candidate	Votes	%	±%
Democratic	Ed Koch	717,376	49.99%	▼2.56
Liberal	Mario Cuomo	522,942	36.44%	▲22.76
Neighborhood Preservation	Mario Cuomo	64,971	4.53%	N/A
Total	Mario Cuomo	587,913	40.97%	N/A
Republican	Roy M. Goodman	58,606	4.08%	▼11.23
Conservative	Barry Farber	57,437	4.00%	▼6.49
Communist	Kenneth F. Newcombe	5,300	0.37%	▲0.16
Socialist Workers	Catarino Garza	3,294	0.23%	▲0.10
United Taxpayers	Vito P. Battista	2,119	0.15%	N/A
Independence	Louis P. Wein	1,127	0.08%	N/A
Libertarian	William Lawry	1,068	0.07%	▼0.45
U.S. Labor	Elijah C. Boyd	873	0.06%	▼0.06
Majority		129,463	9.02	
Total votes		1,435,113	100.00%	
Turnout				

=== Results by borough ===
General Election
		Manhattan	The Bronx	Brooklyn	Queens	Staten Island	Total
Democratic	Edward I. Koch	184,842	116,436	204,934	191,894	19,270	717,376
Liberal – Neighborhood Government	Mario M. Cuomo	77,531	87,421	173,321	208,748	40,932	587,913
Republican	Roy M. Goodman	19,321	6,102	11,491	18,460	3,229	58,606
Conservative	Barry M. Farber	9,070	7,624	16,576	20,453	3,714	57,437
others		4,281	1,731	3,752	3,256	761	13,781
							1,435,113
