= William Brookfield (politician) =

American politician

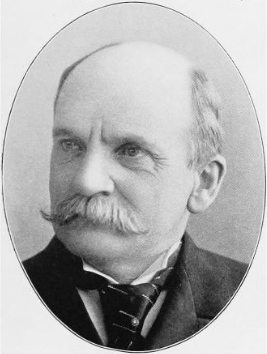
- Born: May 24, 1844; Green Bank, New Jersey, US
- Died: May 13, 1903 (aged 58); Manhattan, New York, US
- Burial place: Woodlawn Cemetery
- Occupations: Businessman, politician
- Political party: Republican
- Spouse: Kate Morgan (m. 1870)

William Brookfield (May 24, 1844 – May 13, 1903) was an American businessman and politician from New York.

== Life ==
Brookfield was born on May 24, 1844, in Green Bank, New Jersey, the son of glass-cutter James M. Brookfield and Catherine A. Brandiff.

Brookfield attended academies in Bethany and Honesdale, Pennsylvania. He then went to the Cayuga Lake Academy in Aurora, New York. In 1861, he left the school and spent six months working as a clerk in a county store. When he was 16, he entered business with his father in the State Street Glass Works and later the South Brooklyn Glass Works. In 1864, they started the Bushwick Glass Works in Williamsburg, Brookfield later become its sole proprietor. He was also president of the Sheldon Axle Company in Wilkes-Barre, Pennsylvania, and the Franklin Loan and Improvement Company of New Jersey, vice-president of the Addison and Pennsylvania Railway Company, and a director of the Augusta Manganese Company, the Greenwich Insurance Company, and the Kings County Fire Insurance Company. He was a member of the New York Chamber of Commerce, the Consolidated Stock and Petroleum Exchange, the Board of Trade and Transportation, and the New York Produce Exchange. He was also president of the National Association of Glass Manufacturers for five years, a trustee of Wells College, and president of St. John's Guild.

In 1873, Brookfield moved from Brooklyn to Manhattan. He was a supporter of the Republican Party all his life, becoming a Republican leader in his Assembly District and chairman of the Republican County Committee. He was a member of the New York Republican State Committee for several years, becoming Chairman of the Committee from 1892 to 1894. He was a supporter of Thomas C. Platt until 1893, when he broke with Platt and became leader of an independent organization known as the Brookfield Republicans. In 1894, he joined the Committee of Seventy that nominated a Fusion ticket that defeated Tammany Hall. In 1895, Mayor Strong appointed him Commissioner of Public Works, an office he resigned from a few months later. He was a presidential elector in the 1888 presidential election, and was a delegate to the 1888 and 1892 Republican National Conventions.

Brookfield was a vice-president of the Union League Club and a member of the Down Town Association, the Lotos Club, and the New York Athletic Club. He was a member of Rev. John Hall's Fifth Avenue Presbyterian Church. In 1870, he married Kate Morgan of Aurora. Their children were Henry M., Frank, J. H., and Edwin Morgan. Kate was the niece of Edwin B. Morgan and Christopher Morgan.

Brookfield died at home from endocarditis on May 13, 1903. He was buried in Woodlawn Cemetery.

Party political offices
Preceded by John N. Knapp	Chairman of the New York Republican State Committee; 1891–1894	Succeeded by Charles W. Hackett
