= Bronx Republican Party =

Affiliate of the Republican Party in New York City

- Chairman: Fred Brown
- Ideology: Conservatism
- National affiliation: Republican Party
- Regional affiliation: New York Republican State Committee
- Colors: Red
- New York State Assembly (Bronx Seats): 0 / 11
- New York State Senate (Bronx Seats): 0 / 6
- Citywide Executive Offices: 0 / 5
- New York City Council (Bronx Seats): 0 / 7

The Bronx Republican Party, more commonly known as the Bronx GOP, is a regional affiliate of the United States Republican Party for the Bronx, New York City, New York.

== Leadership ==
Unlike most other county affiliates for the Republican Party, mostly due to the small size of the Bronx GOP, they do not maintain a traditional committee. Instead, they simply have a chairman and a leader for each seat in the New York State Assembly.

The Current Chairman is Michael Rendino, who was elected in 2016 and re-elected to the office in 2019. He is still the Chair of the organization as of 2025.

== History ==
=== Malcolm Smith bribery scandal ===
On April 2, 2013, the party's chairman Joseph J. Savino was arrested on charges of corruption for accepting a bribe from Democratic State Senator Malcolm Smith to secure the Republican nomination for the 2013 New York City mayoral election. He would be succeeded by John Greaney, a navy veteran and firefighter from the September 11th attacks and a former civil employee who raised concerns as he was a personal friend of Savino and had thousands of dollars of debt.

=== 2016 election ===
During the 2016 Republican Party presidential primaries, the New York Republican State Committee awarded 3 delegates to the Republicans of the 15th district which is solely in the Bronx. This meant the small Bronx Republican party suddenly found themselves in the midst of a heated race between Ted Cruz and Donald Trump to secure their delegates. The New York Times assessed Bronx Republicans where the most "powerful" Republicans in the country, with only 741 voters for every 1 delegate. The Bronx GOP backed Donald Trump, in part due to the Trump Links golf course at Ferry Point Park which improved the local economy, and in part because Ted Cruz did not tell the party he would be visiting the Bronx with a Democratic State Senator for a campaign stop.

Shortly after the election, the chairman John Greaney stepped down due to health complications from the September 11th attacks. A new chairman, former vice-chairman Michael Rendino, was elected in a local sports bar.

=== 2020 election ===
In 2020, Donald Trump received 15.7% of the Borough's vote, compared to 9.4% in 2016. This was the steepest pro-Trump increase across the city, which saw a general pro-Republican trend during the election.

=== 2021 election ===
During the 2021 New York City mayoral election, the party endorsed Fernando Mateo for the Republican nomination. Mateo, the spokesmen for Hispanics Across America, and the state Federation of Taxi Drivers, was the first latino immigrant to run for mayor as a Republican. Despite another endorsement from the Queens Republican Party, Mateo would be unable to secure the third endorsement to become candidate, instead Manhattan, Brooklyn and Staten Island's party would endorse Curtis Sliwa.

=== 2022 election ===
In the 2022 election for District 14, the Bronx GOP stood a candidate, Tina Forte, who defeated Queens Republican Desi Joseph Cuellar in a primary to go on to face Alexandria Ocasio-Cortez. Ocasio-Cortez would handily win 70% to 23%.

=== 2023 election ===
Despite the party's small size, they have undergone a concerted effort to launch a competitive campaign for the 13th city council district held by first term councilwoman Marjorie Velázquez. Kristy Marmorato, chairman Michael Rendino's sister, won the party's primary, in a move that has been decried as nepotism, despite Rendino having no say in the primary. George Havranek, Marmorato's challenger in the primary, was also accused of committing electoral fraud by forging signatures, and admitted to donating to Velázquez's campaign in 2021. Marmorato would go on to win after a run-off election, and secure the endorsement of the Conservative Party. The City assessed the campaign would be close due to the local Hispanic population shifting away from Velázquez due to the ongoing housing crisis. Marmorato would defeat Velazquez with 52.9% to Velazquez's 47.1%.

In the 17th District, the Bronx GOP candidate, Rosalie Nieves, is ran unopposed and faced off against incumbent democrat Rafael Salamanca, and Gonzalo Duran, Salamanca's democratic challenger who secured the Conservative Party's nomination.

=== 2024 election ===
In the 15th Congressional District, the Bronx County Conservative Party candidate and Bronx GOP endorsed candidate, Gonzalo Duran, ran unopposed and faced off against incumbent democrat Ritchie Torres. He received just 21.1% of the vote.

=== 2025 election ===
Main article: 2025 New York City Public Advocate election

On February 18, Gonzalo Duran announced that he would be running for Public Advocate of New York City. On February 25, both the Bronx Republican and Conservative Parties announced that they had chosen Duran as their candidate for Public Advocate. This marks the first time in over 10 years that a citywide Conservative Party candidate has received a cross-party endorsement. Duran would challenge the incumbent, Jumaane D. Williams, earning just 24.9% of the vote.

== Elected officials ==
As of 2023, the Bronx GOP has no elected officials in the New York Senate, New York House of Representatives, the Executive of New York and the New York City Council. The last Republican Borough president of the Bronx was Joseph “Pepperoni” Periconi, who served one term from 1962-65. Prior to him, there was only one other Republican borough president, Douglas Mathewson, who served from 1914-17. The last Republican state senator from the Bronx was Guy Velella who left office in 2004.

Kristy Marmorato was the most recent Bronx Republican city councilor, representing the 13th District from 2024 to 2025.

== See also ==
- Kings County Republican Party
- Queens County Republican Party
- Manhattan Republican Party
- Staten Island Republican Party
- New York Republican State Committee
