= Queens County Republican Party =

Affiliate of the Republican Party in New York City

Queens Republican Party
- Chairman: Tony Nunziato
- Ideology: Conservatism
- National affiliation: Republican Party
- Regional affiliation: New York Republican State Committee
- Colors: Red
- New York State Assembly (Queens Seats): 0 / 18
- New York State Senate (Queens Seats): 0 / 7
- Citywide Executive Offices: 0 / 5
- New York City Council (Queens Seats): 2 / 15
- United States House of Representatives (Queens Seats): 0 / 6
- United States Senate (New York Seats): 0 / 2

Website
- queenscountygop.com

The Queens County Republican Party also known as the Queens Republican Party, Queens GOP or simply as Queens Republicans, is a regional affiliate of the United States Republican Party for the borough of Queens in New York City, New York.

== Leadership ==
Like all county parties in the New York Republican State Committee, the Queens County Republican Party maintains a Queens County Republican Committee, however, does not have an executive branch; instead, the chairman of the committee is the chairman of the party.

The current chairman is Tony Nunziato.

== History ==
On June 25, 2014, longtime chairman Phil Ragusa died in office at the age of 74 from Leukemia.

=== Malcolm Smith bribery scandal ===
On April 2, 2013, the party's vice-chairman, Vincent Tabone, pleaded guilty to accepting a bribe for the Queens Republican Party to endorse Democrat Malcolm Smith so that he could appear as a Republican on the ballot for the 2013 New York City mayoral election. Tabone was placed under additional scrutiny compared to the others arrested. This was due to the fact he was on the payroll of John Catsimatidis, both as an attorney for his grocery store, and as a campaign advisor, earning hundreds of thousands of dollars a year from Catsimatidis. He was also caught on with a wiretap by the FBI saying "I run the Queens County Republican Party," he told an undercover informant. "Nobody else runs the party."

=== 2017 election ===
During the 2017 New York City Council election, the Queens Republican party narrowly won an upset with Robert Holden flipping a Democratic Seat during what The New York Times assessed should've been a wave year for the Democratic party. Holden's victory, despite running on the behalf of the Queens Republican Party, and appearing as a Republican on the ballot, did not result in a change to the city council's composition, as Holden would caucus as a Democrat, the party for which he is personally registered as. This contributed to the growing distrust between the party's leadership and pro-Trump party members, who decried the nomination of Holden.

=== 2018 election ===
During the 2018 New York State Senate election there was an insurgency in the party over the candidacy for the 11th district. The party endorsed and supported Simon Minching over Vickie Paladino, who decried the bias stating the party should not endorse a candidate until after the primaries. Paladino claimed that the party was scared of her over her publicity, which she gained by personally flying to Germany to berate mayor Bill De Blasio at a protest after a NYPD cop was killed. Paladino would win the primary, but lose in the general election, due a split ballot with Tony Avella.

=== 2019 party infighting ===
Since the election of Donald Trump in the 2016 United States presidential election, the Queens Republican Party has had a dicey relationship with Trump and his policies. Most of the party's executives and committee members are part of the Never Trump movement, which has allowed them to continue to count on the votes of moderate and centrist Democrats and independents in elections. However, the more active campaigners, district leaders, and neighborhood organizers, are adamantly pro-Trump, and have been leading an insurgency against party leadership which came to a head in 2019 when the sought to challenge chairwoman Joann Ariola in a leadership election. The effort would fail as the Republican Patriot faction failed to gather the 500 signatures needed for the vote, getting only 452.

=== 2020 election ===
During the 2020 election for Queens County District Attorney, and Borough President, serious fractures would emerge in the party. The first would be between the more liberal party leadership, led by Joann Ariola, who nominated Joe Murray, a registered Democrat, for DA. Ariola argued that if the party sought to win a significant number of seats in the future, they would need to attract more voters, and moderate Democrats uncomfortable with their party's progressive bent would be their prime demographic to shift. The party has also sought to improve their presence in the Boroughs Asian-American and Caribbean-American population as opposed to its largely white voter base. In order to mend the divide, Ariola promised to not run for Borough President, or Eric Ulrich's sole republican seat in the city council. The Republicans would lose both the Borough President and DA race.

During the 2020 United States presidential election, the party's sole elected official, Eric Ulrich, a member of the Never Trump movement, gained headlines when he reversed on his position and stated that he would be voting for Trump in the election. His district, and the borough as a whole, has been a hotbed of the movement, and he stated that the fact he wasn't up for re-election was one of the factors for his reversal.

=== 2021 election ===
Going into the 2021 New York City Council election, the Queens County Republican Party had only a single seat, the 32nd district, being held by Eric Ulrich who was barred from running again due to term limits. Joann Ariola, the Queens County Republican chairwoman announced that she would be running for the seat to keep it in Republican hands after previously promising not to do so, arguing that there was not suitable candidate besides herself. The 32nd district has been described as one of the "loneliest" in the city council by The New York Times, due to it being one of just two held by Republicans that wasn't in Staten Island. Ariola faced off against progressive candidate Felicia Singh, a middle school teacher, and Kenichi Wilson, an independent.

During the election, the Queens County Republican Party maintained a Socially Liberal party line, angering many of the more conservative members of the party. When the party establishment refused calls to back election reform to increase transparency, the insurgents split to form the Queens County Republican Patriots, led by Daniel Maio, and ran their own slate of candidates. However, the Queens Supreme Court would strike down their candidates, due to them filing past the deadline.

The party's candidate for the 24th district, Philip Grillo, was arrested by the Federal Bureau of Investigation due to his role in the January 6 United States Capitol attack and was released on a $100,000 bond. The move shocked the party's leadership, as Grillo was an active member of the party's moderate wing, and worked with Eric Ulrich to “push back against the kooky wing of the party.”

=== 2022 election ===
During the 2022 United States House of Representatives elections in New York, George Santos was elected to the 3rd district, representing parts of Queens, and Nassau counties. However, it would be revealed after the election that Santos made false biographical statements. Chairman Tony Nunziato would not join with his Nassau county counterparts to demand Santos' resignation, instead stating "Show me that he did something illegal", insisting that he will not call for Santos' resignation until criminal prosecution was brought against him. Nunziato recommended that Santos run for the seat, albeit "not enthusiastically."

However, one of the party's councilwomen and former chairwomen, Joann Ariola, would join the calls for his resignation, stating that "he should resign so that we can continue to move forward." Meanwhile, Vickie Paladino, whose council district overlaps with Santos' section of Queens, has refrained from commenting on resignation, but stated the false biography was "disappointing."

=== 2023 election ===
Councilwoman Vickie Paladino faced a concerted Democratic challenge for her seat, with the Queens County Democratic Party sinking much of their camping resources in unseating her. One of the candidates was Tony Avella, who split the ballot of Paladino's failed 2018 New York State Senate election bid, and hoped again to draw moderate Republicans away from her.

== Elected officials ==
In 2021, the party has 139,385 registered voters to the Democrats 807,187.

The last Republican Borough President was James A. Lundy from 1952 to 1957. The last Republican District Attorney was Nat Hentel in 1966.

The Party currently has 3 elected members to the New York City Council:

- Vickie Paladino for District 19.
- Robert Holden for District 30. Only for elections, Holden caucuses with the Democrats in the council.
- Joann Ariola for District 32.

The party currently holds none of the 6 House of Representatives seats in Queens following the removal of George Santos on December 1, 2023.

== See also ==
- Kings County Republican Party
- Manhattan Republican Party
- Bronx Republican Party
- Staten Island Republican Party
- New York Republican State Committee
