= Israel Matz =

- Born: February 9, 1869; Kalvarija, Congress of Poland, Russian Empire
- Died: February 10, 1950 (aged 81); Brooklyn, New York, U.S.
- Occupation: Philanthropist
- Known for: Co-founder of Ex-Lax Inc.
- Spouse: Gussie H. Matz

Israel Matz (Hebrew: ישראל מץ; February 9, 1869 - February 10, 1950) was a Lithuanian Jewish philanthropist. He is well known for co-founding the Ex-Lax company in 1906, today owned by Novartis. His grandson, Roy M. Goodman, was a New York State Senator from 1969–2002.

== Community activity ==
=== Israel Matz Institute for Jewish Law ===
The Israel Matz Institute for Jewish Law at the Faculty of Law of the Hebrew University of Jerusalem, is located on Mount Scopus, in one of the original buildings of the Hebrew University, built in 1925.

=== Israel Matz Foundation ===
The Israel Matz Foundation is a non profit organization located in New York City. The foundation is concerned with aiding indigent Hebrew writers

=== The Israel Matz Chair of Organic Chemistry ===
The Israel Matz Chair of Organic Chemistry was established at the Weizmann Institute of Science by the Alice Matz Goodman Endowment Fund, New York, NY, daughter of Israel Matz.
