= Michael Tannousis =

American politician

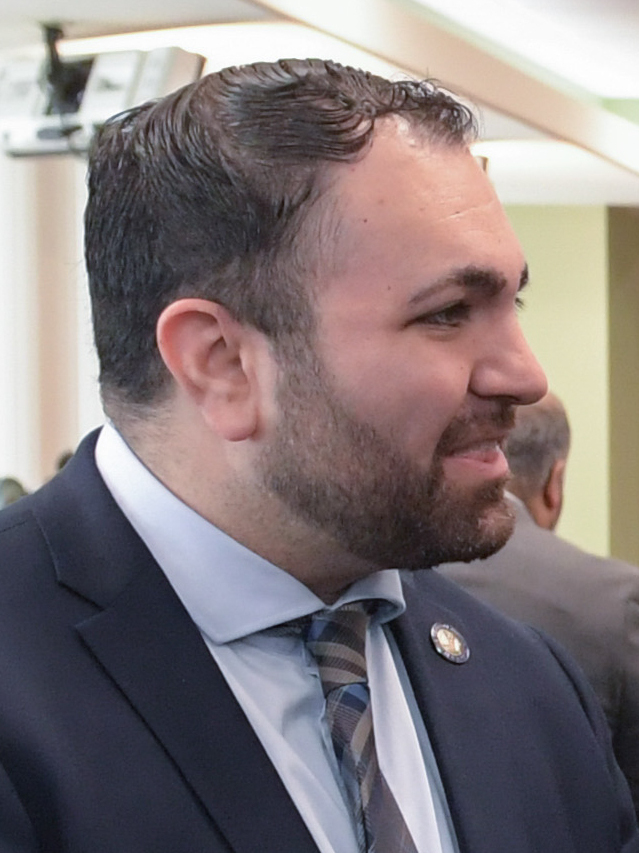
- Tannousis in 2024

Chair of the Staten Island Republican Party
- Incumbent
- Assumed office October 7, 2022
- Preceded by: Anthony Reinhart

Member of the New York State Assembly from the 64th district
- Incumbent
- Assumed office January 1, 2021
- Preceded by: Nicole Malliotakis

Personal details
- Born: December 8, 1983 (age 42) Staten Island, New York, U.S.
- Party: Republican
- Education: Binghamton University (BA); Pace University (JD)
- Website: Campaign website State Assembly website

Michael Tannousis (born December 8, 1983) is an American attorney and politician who is a member of the New York State Assembly from the 64th district. He was elected in 2020 to a term which began on January 1, 2021.

== Early life and education ==
Tannousis was born and raised on Staten Island, the son of immigrants from Cyprus. Tannousis attended Monsignor Farrell High School, then earned a Bachelor of Arts degree in political science from Binghamton University and a Juris Doctor from the Pace University School of Law.

== Career ==
After law school, Tannousis worked as a prosecutor in Staten Island and The Bronx. He also served as a counselor to City Councilman Joe Borelli. After Nicole Malliotakis announced that she would not seek re-election to the New York State Assembly and instead run for the United States House of Representatives, Tannousis declared his candidacy to succeed her. Tannousis defeated Marko Kepi in the Republican primary and Democratic nominee Brandon Patterson in the November general election.

== Electoral history ==
=== 2026 ===
2026 New York State Assembly election, District 64
| Party | Candidate | Votes | % |
|---|---|---|---|
| Republican | Michael Tannousis | | |
| Conservative | Michael Tannousis | | |
| Total | Michael Tannousis (incumbent) | | |
| Democratic | Shpetim Qorraj | | |
| Write-in | | | |
| Total votes | | | 100.0 |

=== 2024 ===
2024 New York State Assembly election, District 64
| Party | Candidate | Votes | % |
|---|---|---|---|
| Republican | Michael Tannousis | 36,626 | 86.2 |
| Conservative | Michael Tannousis | 4,726 | 11.1 |
| Total | Michael Tannousis (incumbent) | 41,352 | 97.3 |
| Write-in | | 1,157 | 2.7 |
| Total votes | | 42,509 | 100.0 |
| Republican hold | | | |

=== 2022 ===
2022 New York State Assembly election, District 64
| Party | Candidate | Votes | % |
|---|---|---|---|
| Republican | Michael Tannousis | 26,690 | 88.4 |
| Conservative | Michael Tannousis | 2,877 | 9.5 |
| Total | Michael Tannousis (incumbent) | 29,567 | 97.9 |
| Write-in | | 635 | 2.1 |
| Total votes | | 30,202 | 100.0 |
| Republican hold | | | |

=== 2020 ===
2020 New York State Assembly election, District 64
Primary election
| Party | Candidate | Votes | % |
|---|---|---|---|
| Republican | Michael Tannousis | 3,616 | 56.3 |
| Republican | Marko Kepi | 2,793 | 43.5 |
| Write-in | | 18 | 0.2 |
| Total votes | | 6,427 | 100.0 |
General election
| Republican | Michael Tannousis | 27,888 | 53.2 |
| Conservative | Michael Tannousis | 2,742 | 5.3 |
| Total | Michael Tannousis | 30,630 | 58.5 |
| Democratic | Brandon Patterson | 21,076 | 40.2 |
| Independence | Brandon Patterson | 621 | 1.2 |
| Total | Brandon Patterson | 21,697 | 41.4 |
| Write-in | | 57 | 0.1 |
| Total votes | | 52,384 | 100.0 |
| Republican hold | | | |
