= New York's 64th State Assembly district =

American legislative district

Assemblymember
Michael Tannousis; R–Great Kills

New York's 64th State Assembly district is one of the 150 districts in the New York State Assembly. It has been represented by Staten Island Republican Party chair Michael Tannousis since 2021, succeeding Nicole Malliotakis.

== Geography ==
=== 2012-present ===
District 64 consists of a portion of Bay Ridge in Brooklyn and communities on the eastern shore of Staten Island, including Grasmere, New Dorp, Oakwood, Old Town, Dongan Hills and South Beach.

The district overlaps (partially) with New York's 10th and 11th congressional districts, the 17th, 23rd, 24th and 26th districts of the New York State Senate, and the 47th, 49th, 50th and 51st districts of the New York City Council.

=== 2000-2012 ===
District 64 was located in Manhattan, comprising Chinatown, the Financial District, and portions of the Lower East Side and the East Village.

=== 1992-2002 ===
District 64 was located in Manhattan. The district includes Chelsea, Hell's Kitchen, Billionaires' Row and portions of the East Village, Midtown Manhattan, Murray Hill and the Upper West Side.

== Recent election results ==
=== 2026 ===
2026 New York State Assembly election, District 64
Party	Candidate	Votes	%
Republican	Michael Tannousis		
Conservative	Michael Tannousis		
Total	Michael Tannousis (incumbent)		
Democratic	Tim Qorraj		
Write-in			
Total votes			100.0

=== 2024 ===
2024 New York State Assembly election, District 64
Party	Candidate	Votes	%
Republican	Michael Tannousis	36,626	
Conservative	Michael Tannousis	4,726	
Total	Michael Tannousis (incumbent)	41,352	97.3
Write-in		1,157	2.7
Total votes		42,509	100.0
Republican hold			

=== 2022 ===
2022 New York State Assembly election, District 64
Party	Candidate	Votes	%
Republican	Michael Tannousis	26,690	
Conservative	Michael Tannousis	2,877	
Total	Michael Tannousis (incumbent)	29,567	97.9
Write-in		635	2.1
Total votes		30,202	100.0
Republican hold			

=== 2020 ===
2020 New York State Assembly election, District 64
Primary election
Party	Candidate	Votes	%
Republican	Michael Tannousis	3,616	56.3
Republican	Marko Kepi	2,793	43.6
Write-in		18	0.1
Total votes		6,427	100.0
General election
Republican	Michael Tannousis	27,888	
Conservative	Michael Tannousis	2,742	
Total	Michael Tannousis	30,630	58.5
Democratic	Brandon Patterson	21,076	
Independence	Brandon Patterson	621	
Total	Brandon Patterson	21,697	41.4
Write-in		18	0.1
Total votes		52,390	100.0
Republican hold			

=== 2018 ===
2018 New York State Assembly election, District 64
Primary election
Party	Candidate	Votes	%
Reform	Nicole Malliotakis (incumbent)	248	92.1
Write-in		21	7.9
Total votes		269	100.0
General election
Republican	Nicole Malliotakis	17,971	
Conservative	Nicole Malliotakis	1,835	
Independence	Nicole Malliotakis	861	
Reform	Nicole Malliotakis	226	
Total	Nicole Malliotakis (incumbent)	20,893	60.1
Democratic	Adam Baumel	13,838	39.8
Write-in		40	0.1
Total votes		34,771	100.0
Republican hold			

=== 2016 ===
2016 New York State Assembly election, District 64
Party	Candidate	Votes	%
Republican	Nicole Malliotakis	26,907	
Independence	Nicole Malliotakis	3,629	
Conservative	Nicole Malliotakis	3,212	
Reform	Nicole Malliotakis	785	
Total	Nicole Malliotakis (incumbent)	34,533	98.9
Write-in		399	1.1
Total votes		34,932	100.0
Republican hold			

=== 2014 ===
2014 New York State Assembly election, District 64
Party	Candidate	Votes	%
Republican	Nicole Malliotakis	12,112	
Conservative	Nicole Malliotakis	1,907	
Independence	Nicole Malliotakis	1,032	
Total	Nicole Malliotakis (incumbent)	15,051	73.3
Democratic	Marybeth Melendez	4,788	
Working Families	Marybeth Melendez	680	
Total	Marybeth Melendez	5,468	26.6
Write-in		27	0.1
Total votes		20,546	100.0
Republican hold			

=== 2012 ===
2012 New York State Assembly election, District 64
Party	Candidate	Votes	%
Republican	Nicole Malliotakis	17,731	
Conservative	Nicole Malliotakis	2,393	
Independence	Nicole Malliotakis	1,049	
Total	Nicole Malliotakis	21,173	61.5
Democratic	John Mancuso	12,328	
Working Families	John Mancuso	913	
Total	John Mancuso	13,241	38.4
Write-in		33	0.1
Total votes		34,447	100.0
Republican win (new boundaries)			

=== 2010 ===
2010 New York State Assembly election, District 64
Party	Candidate	Votes	%
Democratic	Sheldon Silver	15,329	
Working Families	Sheldon Silver	1,552	
Total	Sheldon Silver (incumbent)	16,881	98.7
Write-in		224	1.3
Total votes		17,105	100.0
Democratic hold			

=== 2008 ===
2008 New York State Assembly election, District 64
Primary election
Party	Candidate	Votes	%
Democratic	Sheldon Silver (incumbent)	7,037	68.1
Democratic	Paul Newell	2,401	23.3
Democratic	Luke Henry	891	8.6
Write-in		0	0.0
Total votes		10,329	100.0
General election
Democratic	Sheldon Silver	26,285	
Working Families	Sheldon Silver	1,347	
Total	Sheldon Silver (incumbent)	27,632	78.9
Republican	Danniel Maio	7,387	21.1
Write-in		10	0.0
Total votes		35,029	100.0
Democratic hold			

=== 2006 ===
2006 New York State Assembly election, District 64
Party	Candidate	Votes	%
Democratic	Sheldon Silver	16,276	
Working Families	Sheldon Silver	1,510	
Total	Sheldon Silver (incumbent)	17,786	86.6
Republican	Michael Imperiale	2,482	
Conservative	Michael Imperiale	276	
Total	Michael Imperiale	2,758	13.4
Write-in		5	0.0
Total votes		20,549	100.0
Democratic hold			

=== 2004 ===
2004 New York State Assembly election, District 64
Party	Candidate	Votes	%
Democratic	Sheldon Silver	25,100	
Working Families	Sheldon Silver	1,279	
Total	Sheldon Silver (incumbent)	26,379	93.7
Independence	Carrie Sackett	1,770	6.3
Write-in		0	0.0
Total votes		28,149	100.0
Democratic hold			

=== 2002 ===
2002 New York State Assembly election, District 64
Party	Candidate	Votes	%
Democratic	Sheldon Silver	11,857	
Working Families	Sheldon Silver	1,119	
Liberal	Sheldon Silver	399	
Total	Sheldon Silver (incumbent)	13,375	92.8
Green	Tara Meadows	1,040	7.2
Write-in		2	0.0
Total votes		14,417	100.0
Democratic win (new boundaries)			

=== 2000 ===
2000 New York State Assembly election, District 64
Party	Candidate	Votes	%
Democratic	Richard Gottfried	34,521	
Working Families	Richard Gottfried	1,669	
Liberal	Richard Gottfried	1,180	
Total	Richard Gottfried (incumbent)	37,370	100.0
Write-in		5	0.0
Total votes		37,375	100.0
Democratic hold			

=== Federal results in Assembly District 64 ===
Year	Office	Results
2024	President	Trump 65.0 - 32.8%
2024	Senate	Sapraicone 62.6 - 36.2%
2022	Senate	Pinion 63.9 - 35.6%
2020	President	Trump 56.7 - 42.9%
2018	Senate	Gillibrand 52.2 - 47.7%
2016	President	Trump 56.4 - 40.1%
2016	Senate	Schumer 60.7 - 37.3%
2012	President	Romney 50.2 - 48.4%
2012	Senate	Gillibrand 60.9 - 37.6%
