= New York Republican State Committee =

Affiliate of the Republican Party in the U.S. state of New York

- Chairperson: Edward F. Cox
- Senate Leader: Rob Ortt
- Assembly Leader: Ed Ra
- Founded: 1855; 171 years ago
- Headquarters: 315 State Street; Albany, New York 12210
- Student wing: New York Federation of College Republicans
- Youth wing: New York State Young Republicans
- Membership (2026): ▲2,835,976
- Ideology: Conservatism
- National affiliation: Republican Party
- Colors: Red
- New York State Assembly: 47 / 150
- New York State Senate: 22 / 63
- Statewide Executive Offices: 0 / 4
- New York City Council: 6 / 51
- United States House of Representatives (New York): 7 / 26
- United States Senate (New York): 0 / 2

Election symbol

Website
- nygop.org

The New York Republican State Committee, established in 1855, is the New York State affiliate of the United States Republican Party (GOP). The party has headquarters in Albany, New York; Buffalo, New York; and New York City. The purpose of the committee is to nominate Republican candidates for election to New York and federal political roles. It also assists its nominees in their election campaigns.

== History ==
The New York Republican State Committee was established in 1855, one year after the founding of the "Republican Party" by William H. Seward and Thurlow Weed. Initially, the committee met every three years to plan the Republican National Convention and it occasionally met during the election campaigning periods. The committee nominees were first politically successful in 1856. Since 1959, Nelson Rockefeller (1959–1973) and George Pataki (1995–2006) have been the only two elected Republican governors of New York.

Until 1911, the New York Republican State Committee nominated its candidates through a primary or caucus system, which meant the average voter had very little input as to who would be their choice for the state and federal offices. That system was taken out of practice after the passing of the Direct Primary Law in 1911, which allowed for more input from those present at the primary.

== Organization ==
Office	Officeholder
Chairman	Edward F. Cox
Executive Vice Chairman	John Burnett
Secretary	Venessa Simon
Treasurer	Carl Zeilman
National Committeewoman	Jennifer Saul
National Committeeman	Charlie Joyce

=== County committee ===
New York State has 62 counties. Every two years, in each county, Republicans elect a "Republican County Committee". The chair of each county committee is the face of the Republican Party in that county. New York also has 150 Assembly districts. Republicans elect one male and one female leader in each district. The district leaders form part of the executive committee of the respective county committee. The chair and the executive committee seek new party members; control local finances; find candidates to run for public office and choose the nominee (unless both candidates have petitioned enough signatures to trigger a primary).

Several of these counties are notable due to their high population, and impact on national politics. These include:

- The Bronx Republican Party
- The Manhattan Republican Party
- Queens County Republican Party
- Kings County Republican Party
- Staten Island Republican Party
- Niagara County Republican Committee

=== State committee ===
The New York State Republican State Committee is composed of one male and one female representative from each Assembly District. Before each statewide election, the committee organises a party convention and chooses candidates for offices of the state. 60% of the committee's vote is needed to win the party's nomination. If no candidate wins 60% of the committee's vote, the candidates with more than 25 percent of the committee's vote compete in a "primary" which is held in the month of September. A candidate with less than 25 percent of the committee's vote may compete in the "primary" if they have a petition of support of greater than 15000 voters.

The State Committee also elects one National Committeewoman and one National Committeeman to represent the state committee to the Republican National Committee in Washington, D.C. The current National Committee members are Jennifer Saul, a Republican fundraiser and former chairwoman of the New York County Republican Committee, and Lawrence Kadish, a real estate developer from downstate New York.

== Current elected officials ==
The New York Republican Party holds 22 out of the 63 seats in the New York State Senate and seven of the state's 26 U.S. House seats.

=== Members of Congress ===
==== U.S. Senate ====
- None

Both of New York's U.S. Senate seats have been held by Democrats since 1999. Al D'Amato was the last Republican to represent New York in the U.S. Senate. First elected in 1980, D'Amato lost his bid for a fourth term in 1998 to Chuck Schumer who has held the seat since.

==== U.S. House of Representatives ====
Out of the 26 seats New York is apportioned in the U.S. House of Representatives, seven are held by Republicans:

District	Member	Photo
1st	Nick LaLota	
2nd	Andrew Garbarino	
11th	Nicole Malliotakis	
17th	Mike Lawler	
21st	Elise Stefanik	
21st	Anthony Constantino (elect)	
23rd	Nick Langworthy	
24th	Claudia Tenney	

=== State legislative leaders ===
==== New York State Senate ====
- Rob Ortt: Minority Leader
- Andrew Lanza: Deputy Minority Leader
- Patty Ritchie: Chair of the Senate Minority Conference
- Sue Serino: Vice Chair of the Senate Minority Conference
- Patrick Gallivan: Minority Whip
- Joseph Griffo: Assistant Minority Leader

==== New York State Assembly ====
- Ed Ra: Minority Leader
- Andy Goodell: Minority Leader Pro Tempore
- Mary Beth Walsh: Assistant Minority Leader Pro Tempore
- Michael Norris: Chair of the Assembly Minority Conference
- Jake Ashby: Vice Chair of the Assembly Minority Conference
- Michael Montesano: Minority Whip

=== Mayoral offices ===
As of October 2026, one of New York's top ten largest cities is controlled by a Republican:

- Utica (10): Michael Galime

== Republican presidents from New York ==
- Chester A. Arthur (1881−1885)
- Theodore Roosevelt (1901−1909)
- Richard Nixon (1969–1974) (Note: Nixon's official state of residence was New York because he moved there to practice law after his defeat in the 1962 California gubernatorial election. During his first term as president, Nixon re-established his residency in California. Consequently, most reliable reference books, including the January 6, 1969, edition of the Congressional Record, list his home state as New York.)
- Donald Trump (2017−2021, 2025−Present) (Note: Changed residency to Florida in 2019 during first presidency.)

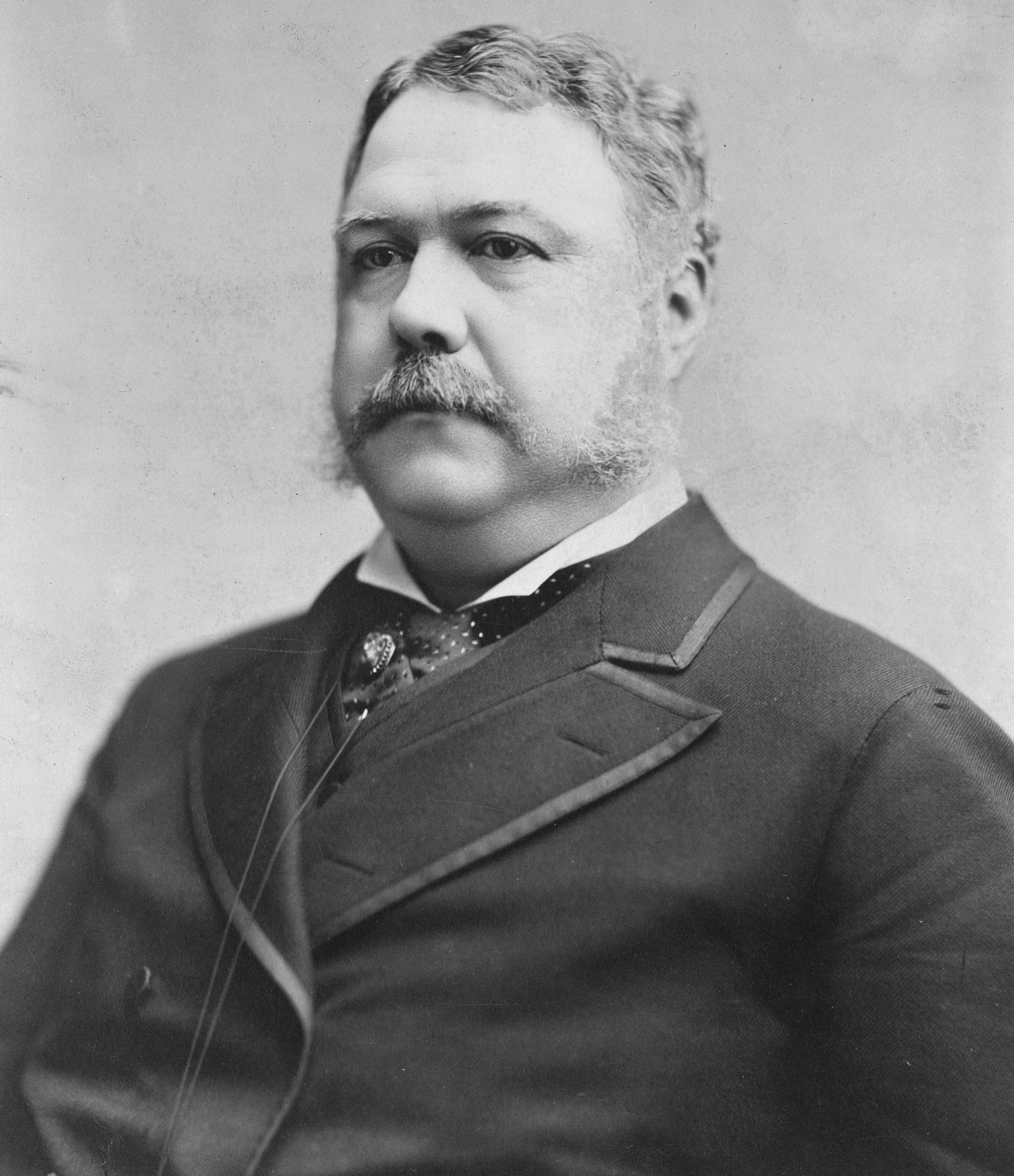
President Chester A. Arthur (1881−1885)

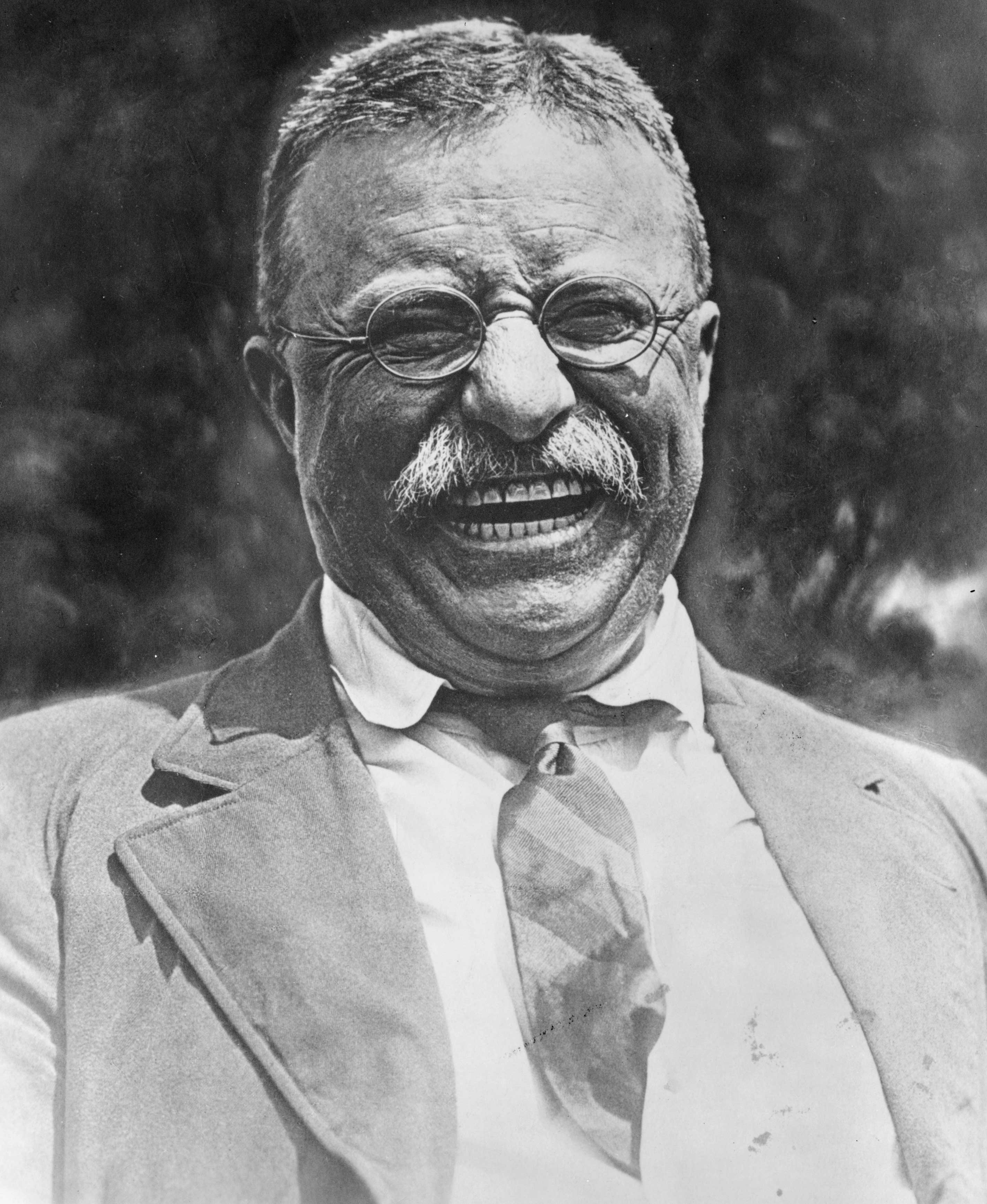
President Theodore Roosevelt (1901−1909)

President Donald Trump (2017−2021)

== List of chairs ==
Chair	Tenure	Hometown while serving
Edwin D. Morgan	1856–1858; 1874–1875	Manhattan
James Kelly	1858–1860	Manhattan
Simeon Draper	1860–1862	Manhattan
Henry R. Low	1862–1863	Monticello
Charles Jones	1863–1865	Brooklyn
William R. Stewart	1865–1866	Manhattan
Hamilton Harris	1866–1870	Albany
Alonzo B. Cornell	1870–1874; 1875–1877; 1878–1879	Manhattan
John F. Smyth	1877–1878; 1882–1883	Albany
Chester A. Arthur	1879–1881	Manhattan
B. Platt Carpenter	1881–1882	Stanford
James D. Warren	1883–1885	Buffalo
Chester S. Cole	1885–1887	Corning
Cornelius N. Bliss	1887–1889	Manhattan
John N. Knapp	1889–1891	Auburn
William Brookfield	September 1891 – September 1894	
Charles W. Hackett	September 1894 – April 1898	Utica
Benjamin Odell	May 1898 – November 1900; April 1904 – September 1906	Newburgh
George W. Dunn	November 1900 – April 1904	Binghamton
Timothy L. Woodruff	September 1906 – October 1910	Brooklyn
Ezra P. Prentice	October 1910 – January 1911	Manhattan
William Barnes Jr.	January 1911 – September 1914	Albany
Frederick C. Tanner	October 1914 – January 1917	Manhattan
George A. Glynn	January 1917 – September 1922	Watertown
George K. Morris	September 1922 – August 1928	Amsterdam
H. Edmund Machold	August 1928 – June 1929	Watertown
William J. Maier	June 1929 – November 1930	Seneca Falls
W. Kingsland Macy	December 1930 – September 1934	Islip
Melvin C. Eaton	September 1934 – November 1936	Norwich
William S. Murray	January 1937 – April 1940	Utica
Edwin Jaeckle	April 1940 – November 1944	Buffalo
Glen R. Bedenkapp	January 1945 – February 1949	Lewiston
William L. Pfeiffer	1949 – September 1953	Buffalo
Dean P. Taylor	September 1953 – September 1954	Troy
L. Judson Morhouse	September 1954 – January 1963	Ticonderoga
Fred A. Young	April 1963 – January 1965	Lowville
Carl Spad	February 1965 – May 1967	White Plains
Charles A. Schoeneck Jr.	May 1967 – April 1969	Syracuse
Charles T. Lanigan	1969 – November 1972	Utica
Richard M. Rosenbaum	November 1972 – June 1977	Rochester
Bernard M. Kilbourn	June 1977 – 1981	Utica
George L. Clark Jr.	March 1981 – July 1985	Brooklyn
Anthony J. Colavita	September 19, 1985 – June 22, 1989	Westchester County
J. Patrick Barrett	June 22, 1989 – January 14, 1991	Syracuse
William Powers	January 14, 1991 – March 8, 2001	Rensselaer County
Sandy Treadwell	March 8, 2001 – November 15, 2004	Westport
Stephen Minarik	November 15, 2004 – November 15, 2006	Webster
Joseph Mondello	November 15, 2006 – September 29, 2009	Hempstead
Edward F. Cox	September 29, 2009 – July 1, 2019 March 13, 2023 – present	Manhattan
Nick Langworthy	July 1, 2019 – March 13, 2023	Amherst

== See also ==
- Elections in New York (state)
- New York State Democratic Committee
- Political party strength in New York
- Rockefeller Republican
- The New York Young Republican Club

== General References ==
- New York Republican State Committee Records, 1888-2001. M.E. Grenander Department of Special Collections and Archives, University Libraries, University at Albany, State University of New York (hereafter referred to as the New York Republican State Committee Records).
