= 2025 New York City mayoral election =

- November 4, 2025
- Registered: 5,103,941
- Turnout: 2,218,647; 43.47% (▲20.08 pp)
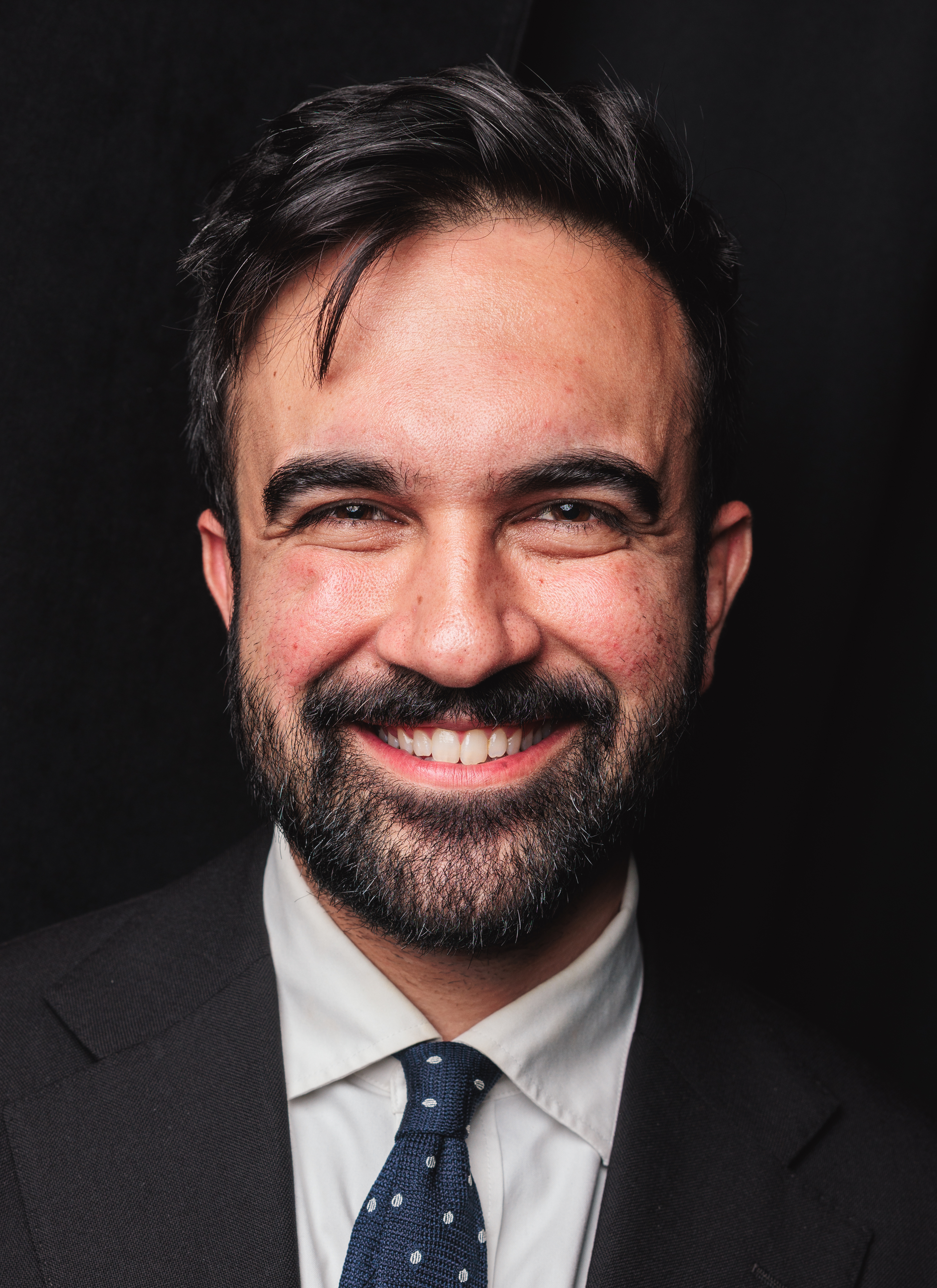

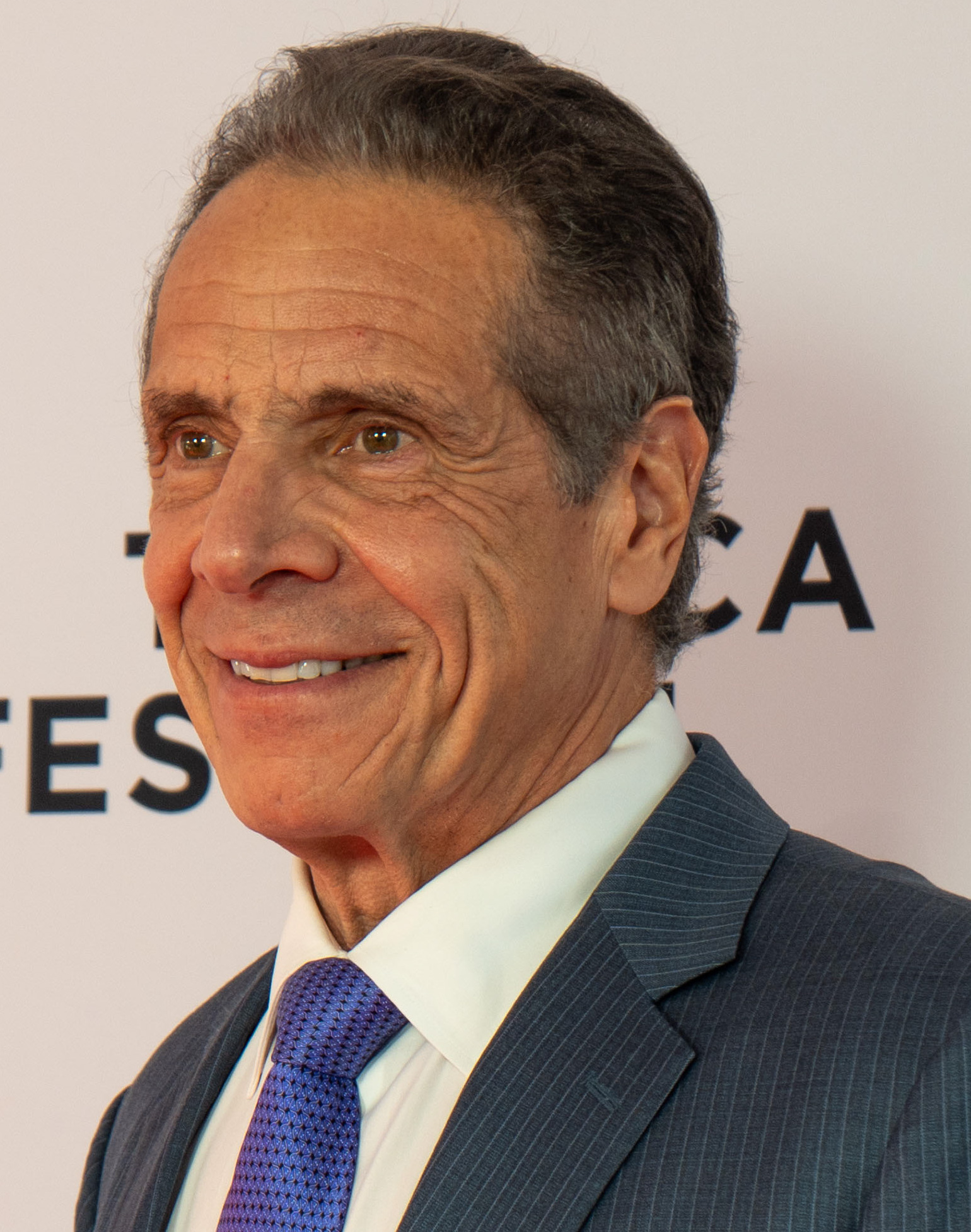

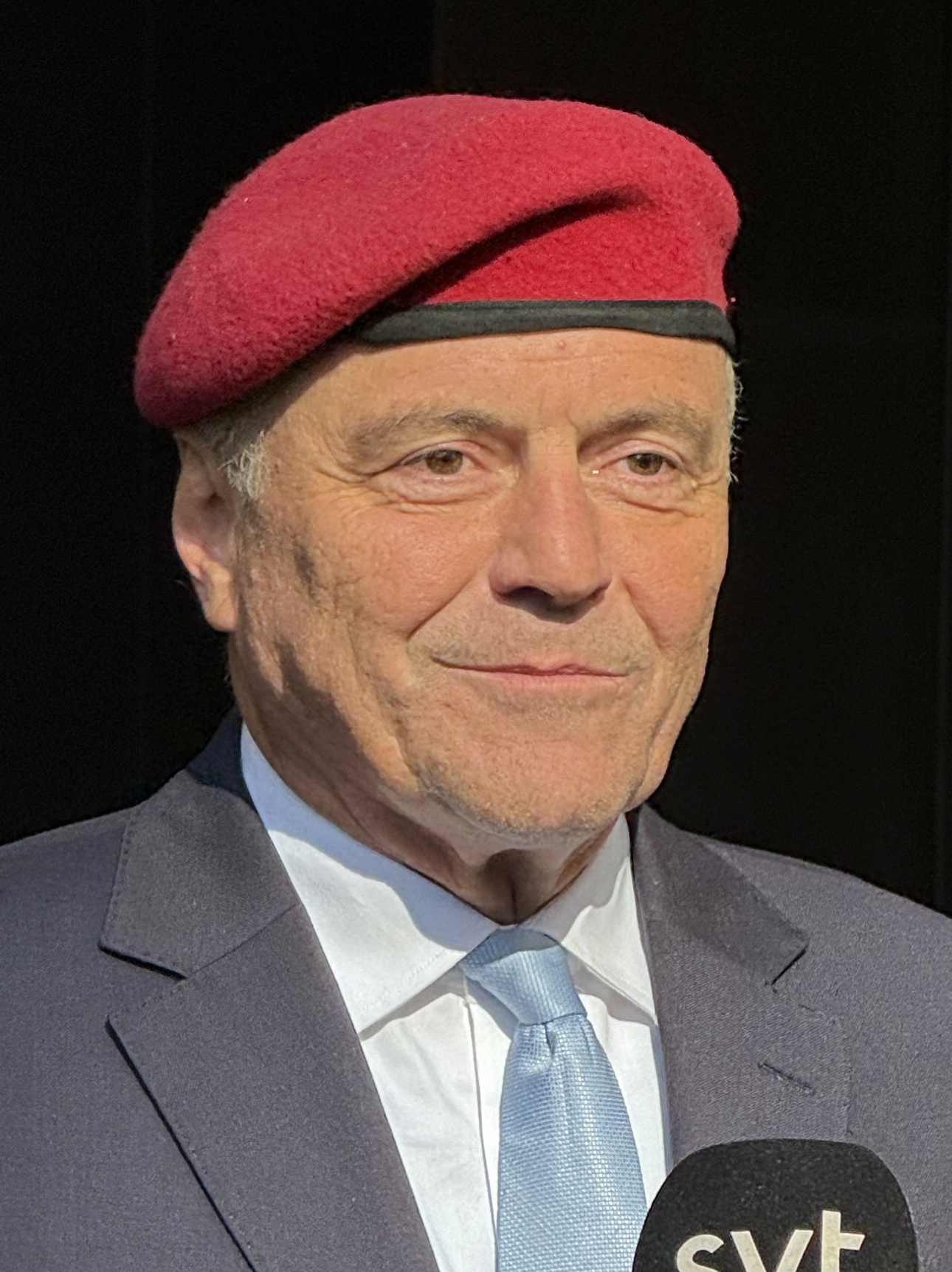
| Nominee | Zohran Mamdani | Andrew Cuomo | Curtis Sliwa |
| Party | Democratic | Independent (Note: Cuomo was defeated in the Democratic primary by Zohran Mamdani, but he continued to run in the general election under the third-party ballot line "Fight and Deliver". He remained a registered Democrat throughout the campaign.) | Republican (Note: Sliwa also ran on a second independent ballot line called "Protect Animals".) |
| Alliance | Working Families |
| Popular vote | 1,114,184 | 906,614 | 153,749 |
| Percentage | 50.78% | 41.32% | 7.01% |
- Mamdani: 30–40% 40–50% 50–60% 60–70% 70–80% 80–90% >90% Cuomo: 30–40% 40–50% 50–60% 60–70% 70–80% 80–90% >90% Sliwa: >90% Tie: 40–50% 50% No votes
Mayor before election
Eric Adams
Democratic
Elected mayor
Zohran Mamdani
Democratic

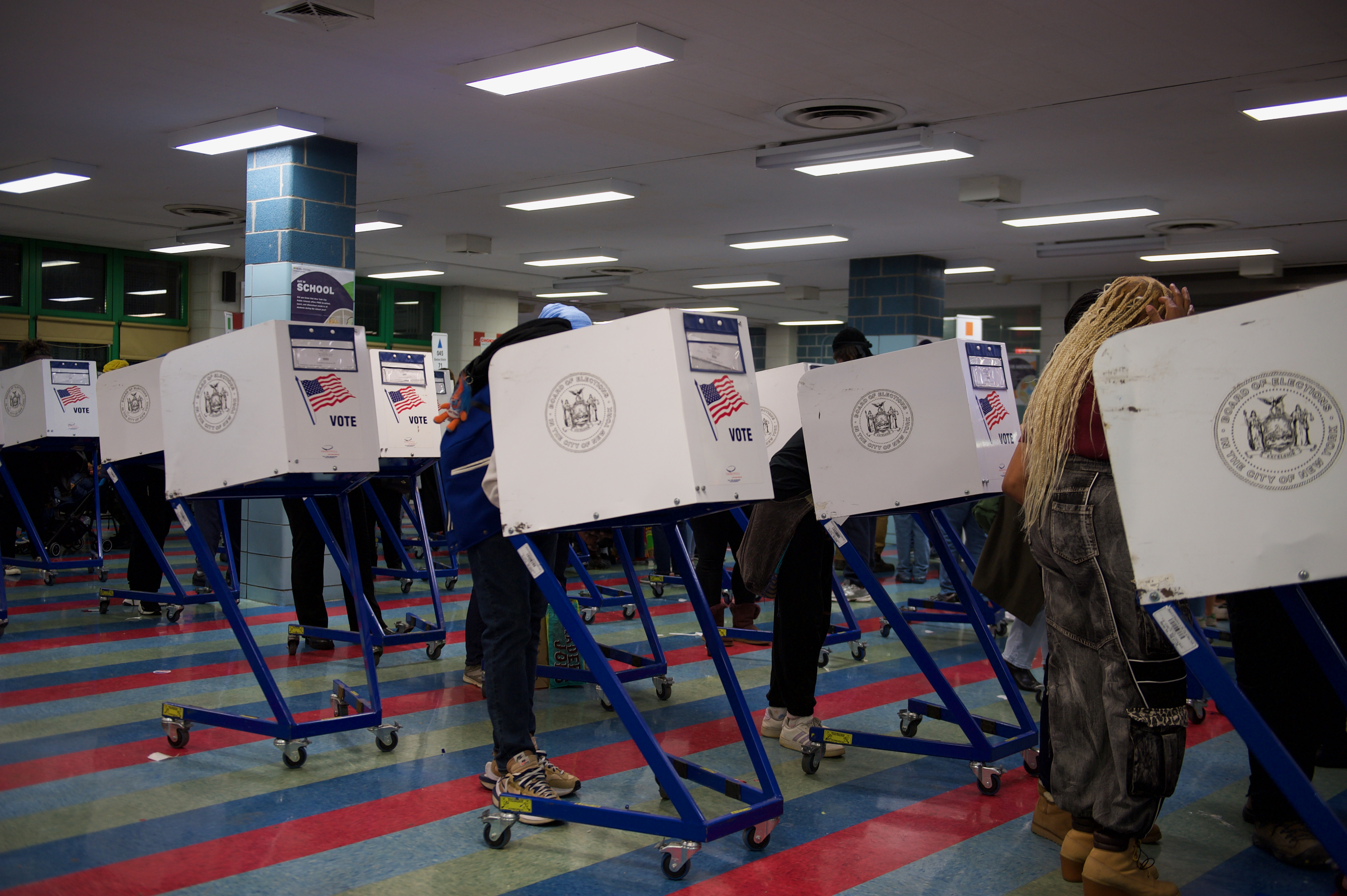
Voters cast ballots at PS 131 in upper Manhattan

An election for the mayor of New York City was held on November 4, 2025. Democratic state assemblyman Zohran Mamdani won the election with 50.78% of the vote, defeating Republican activist Curtis Sliwa and independent former Democratic governor Andrew Cuomo. This election featured the highest turnout for a New York City mayoral election since 1993, mainly due to significant young voter registration. Mamdani succeeded Democratic incumbent Eric Adams on January 1, 2026, becoming the first Muslim and first South Asian mayor of New York City, as well as its youngest since Hugh J. Grant in 1892.

Adams initially ran for a second term (at first as a Democrat, and later as an independent), but withdrew from the race in September 2025. He remained on the voting ballot because he ended his campaign too late for his name to be removed. Cuomo, pursuing a political comeback after he resigned as New York governor in 2021, was the frontrunner for the Democratic nomination as of early June 2025; however, he was defeated by Mamdani in the Democratic primary in a major upset. Following his primary loss, Cuomo launched an independent campaign. Sliwa, the Republican nominee in the 2021 New York City mayoral election, ran unopposed for his party's nomination.

Mamdani ran on a democratic socialist platform focusing on affordability. Cuomo ran on a broadly centrist platform with a focus on crime and combating antisemitism while also being endorsed by Donald Trump, an endorsement Cuomo declined, while Sliwa criticized both from the political right and advocated tough on crime policies. Mamdani became the first mayoral candidate since 1969 to receive more than one million votes, and the race was the first since 1969 to attract more than two million votes in total. The race saw a massive increase in turnout (up 20 pp) and the first time turnout increased since 2001.

== Background ==
Eric Adams was elected mayor of New York City in the 2021 mayoral election, narrowly winning the Democratic primary election and defeating the Republican nominee, Curtis Sliwa, in the general election in a landslide victory. In September 2024, a series of investigations into the Adams administration emerged. Adams was indicted on federal charges of bribery, fraud, and soliciting illegal foreign campaign donations. Adams pleaded not guilty to the charges.

Adams was the first New York City mayor to be charged with crimes while in office, and he received several calls to resign before the end of his term. An early October 2024 poll conducted by Marist College found his approval rating to be just 26%, and found that 69% of voters thought he should resign. In February 2025, the United States Department of Justice under the second Trump administration instructed federal prosecutors to drop all charges against Adams. The case against Adams was dismissed with prejudice in April 2025.

== Democratic primary ==
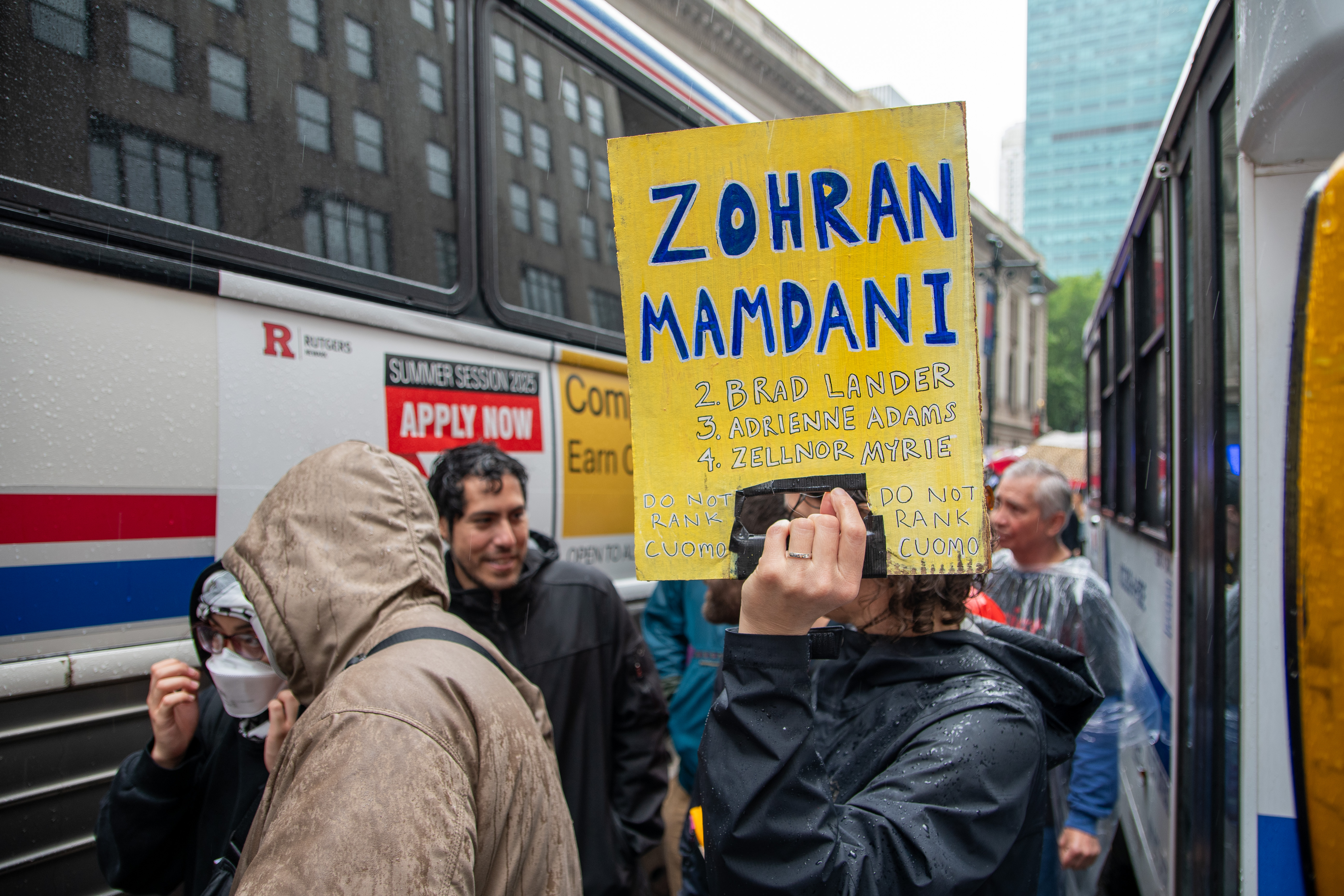
Protester during the June 2025 No Kings protests with sign in support of Zohran Mamdani and other candidates, with text reading "do not rank Cuomo"

Primary elections for the Democratic Party were held on June 24, 2025, with the early voting period beginning on June 14. In New York City, primaries are held using ranked-choice voting, also known as instant-runoff voting. In March 2025, former New York governor Andrew Cuomo, pursuing a political comeback after he resigned as governor in 2021 amid a sexual harassment scandal, announced his mayoral campaign; polls showed Cuomo leading all other mayoral candidates among Democratic voters following the announcement of his intention to run. In April 2025, Adams announced that he would exit the Democratic primary and instead seek re-election as an independent. Leading up to the election, polls showed that Cuomo continued to be the narrow frontrunner in the Democratic primary, with Assemblymember Zohran Mamdani in second place; one June poll found that Mamdani had a narrow lead over Cuomo.

Opinion polling for the Democratic primary; Mamdani outperformed all polls by wide margins

On June 24, Mamdani defeated Cuomo, City Comptroller Brad Lander, and eight other candidates to become the Democratic nominee for mayor. Mamdani's victory was considered a major upset. Mamdani suggested imposing a flat 2% tax on New Yorkers who earn more than $1 million and a number of housing plans, such as a promise to freeze rents on rent-stabilized units, extensive public housing development and refurbishment, and stricter regulation of landlords, upsetting some in the luxury real estate market. Nevertheless, Cuomo, who also filed to run on the independent "Fight and Deliver" ballot line, remained on the general election ballot.

=== Candidates ===
==== Nominee ====
| Candidate | Experience | Announced | Ref |
|---|---|---|---|
| Zohran Mamdani | Assembly member from the 36th district (2021–2025) | October 22, 2024; Website | (Note: Also appeared on the ballot on the Working Families Party line.) |

==== Eliminated in primary ====
- Adrienne Adams, speaker of the New York City Council (2022–2025) from the 28th district (2017–2025)
- Selma Bartholomew, educator
- Michael Blake, former state assemblymember from the 79th district (2015–2021), candidate for public advocate in 2019, and candidate for New York's 15th congressional district in 2020
- Andrew Cuomo, former governor of New York (2011–2021) and U.S. Secretary of Housing and Urban Development (1997–2001)
- Brad Lander, New York City comptroller (2022–2025)
- Zellnor Myrie, state senator from the 20th district (2019–present)
- Paperboy Prince, artist and perennial candidate
- Jessica Ramos, state senator from the 13th district (2019–present)
- Scott Stringer, former New York City comptroller (2014–2021) and candidate for mayor in 2021
- Whitney Tilson, hedge fund manager

==== Withdrawn ====
- Eric Adams, incumbent mayor (ran as an independent; later withdrew)

==== Declined ====
- Jennifer Jones Austin, lawyer and nonprofit CEO
- Jamaal Bowman, former U.S. representative from New York's 16th congressional district (2021–2025) (endorsed Mamdani)
- Justin Brannan, city councilmember from the 47th district (2018–2025) (running for comptroller)
- Kathryn Garcia, New York State director of Operations (2021–2026), former commissioner of the New York City Department of Sanitation (2014–2020), and candidate for mayor in 2021
- Dan Goldman, U.S. representative from New York's 10th congressional district (2023–present) (endorsed Myrie)
- Letitia James, attorney general of New York (2019–present) and former New York City public advocate (2014–2018) (running for re-election, co-endorsed Adrienne Adams, Lander, Mamdani, and Myrie)
- Mark Levine, Manhattan borough president (2020–2025) (running for comptroller)
- Yuh-Line Niou, former state assemblymember from the 65th district (2017–2022) and candidate for New York's 10th congressional district in 2022 (endorsed Mamdani)
- Antonio Reynoso, Brooklyn borough president (2022–present) (running for re-election, co-endorsed Adrienne Adams, Lander, and Mamdani)
- Ritchie Torres, U.S. representative from New York's 15th congressional district (2021–present) (endorsed Cuomo)
- Jumaane Williams, New York City public advocate (2019–present), candidate for lieutenant governor in 2018, and candidate for governor in 2022 (running for re-election, co-endorsed Adrienne Adams, Lander, and Mamdani)

=== Results ===
2025 New York City Democratic mayoral primary
| Candidate | Round 1 | | Round 2 | | Round 3 | |
| Candidate | Votes | % | Votes | % | Votes | % |
|---|---|---|---|---|---|---|
| Zohran Mamdani | 469,642 | 43.82% | 469,755 | 43.86% | 573,169 | 56.39% |
| Andrew Cuomo | 387,137 | 36.12% | 387,377 | 36.17% | 443,229 | 43.61% |
| Brad Lander | 120,634 | 11.26% | 120,707 | 11.27% | Eliminated | |
| Adrienne Adams | 44,192 | 4.12% | 44,359 | 4.14% | Eliminated | |
| Scott Stringer | 17,820 | 1.66% | 17,894 | 1.67% | Eliminated | |
| Zellnor Myrie | 10,593 | 0.99% | 10,648 | 0.99% | Eliminated | |
| Whitney Tilson | 8,443 | 0.79% | 8,525 | 0.80% | Eliminated | |
| Michael Blake | 4,366 | 0.41% | 4,389 | 0.41% | Eliminated | |
| Jessica Ramos | 4,273 | 0.40% | 4,294 | 0.40% | Eliminated | |
| Paperboy Prince | 1,560 | 0.15% | 1,628 | 0.15% | Eliminated | |
| Selma Bartholomew | 1,489 | 0.14% | 1,505 | 0.14% | Eliminated | |
| Write-ins | 1,581 | 0.15% | Eliminated | | | |
| Active votes | 1,071,730 | 100.00% | 1,071,081 | 99.94% | 1,016,398 | 94.84% |
| Exhausted ballots | —N/a | | 649 | 0.06% | 55,332 | 5.16% |
Source: New York City Board of Elections

== Republican primary ==
Curtis Sliwa won the Republican Party primary, having run uncontested, becoming the Republican nominee for mayor. Sliwa was the Republican mayoral nominee in 2021 but was defeated by Eric Adams in a landslide.

=== Candidates ===
==== Nominee ====
| Candidate | Experience | Announced | Ref |
|---|---|---|---|
| Curtis Sliwa | Founder and CEO of the Guardian Angels; Nominee for mayor in 2021 | February 13, 2025; Website | |

==== Declined ====
- Eric Adams, incumbent Democratic mayor (2022–2025) (ran as an independent; later withdrawn)
- Joe Borelli, former minority leader of the New York City Council (2021–2025) from the 51st District (2015–2025)
- John Catsimatidis, CEO of Gristedes and D'Agostino Supermarkets and candidate for mayor in 2013 (endorsed Adams, then Sliwa, then Cuomo)
- Rudy Giuliani, former mayor (1994–2001) and former U.S. attorney for the Southern District of New York (1983–1989)
- Jim Walden, antitrust and government law attorney (ran as an independent; later withdrawn)

== Third parties and independents ==
=== Independents ===
On April 3, 2025, Eric Adams announced his exit from the Democratic primary and instead ran in the general election as an independent. Adams circulated petitions to run on an "EndAntiSemitism" ballot line, as well as a "Safe&Affordable" ballot line; however, the Board of Elections limited independent candidates to one ballot line each; major party candidates can otherwise appear on multiple lines. Adams formally selected the latter line on August 22. On September 28, Adams withdrew his candidacy from the general election, but his name remained on the ballot.

Andrew Cuomo formed a minor political party called the "Fight and Deliver Party" in May 2025. After Cuomo conceded the Democratic primary, he confirmed his intention to remain on the ballot on the "Fight and Deliver" ballot line. He then launched his independent campaign on July 14, 2025. The "Protect Animals" ballot line was newly created by Republican nominee Curtis Sliwa, with Sliwa as the nominee. Sliwa made animal rights a centerpiece of his campaign, accusing Animal Care Centers of NYC of mistreating animals, and advocating for no-kill shelters.

Attorney and first-time political candidate Jim Walden of Brooklyn Heights ran for mayor as a "business-minded technocrat" with an anti-corruption platform. Walden sued to challenge a law that bans the use of the words "independent" and "independence" in political party names. On September 2, he withdrew—although his name remained on the ballot—and encouraged other contenders to do the same to defeat Mamdani.

Independent candidates
| Candidate | Experience | Announced | Ref |
|---|---|---|---|
| Andrew Cuomo | Governor of New York (2011–2021); Attorney general of New York (2007–2010); U.S. Secretary of Housing and Urban Development (1997–2001) | March 1, 2025; Website | |

==== Other declared candidates ====
- Joseph Hernandez, biotechnology entrepreneur

==== Withdrawn ====
Independent candidates
| Candidate | Experience | Announced | Suspended | Ref |
|---|---|---|---|---|
| Eric Adams | NYC mayor (2022–2025); Brooklyn borough president (2014–2021); NY state senator from the 20th district (2007–2013) | April 3, 2025; Website | September 28, 2025 | |
| Jim Walden | Antitrust and government law attorney Former assistant U.S. attorney | October 23, 2024; Website | September 2, 2025 | |

==== Did not make the ballot ====
- Jean Anglade, advocate
- Kyle Gutierrez, college student
- Abbey Laurel-Smith, perennial candidate
- Paul Mailhot, organizer for the Socialist Workers Party
- Montell Moseley, former education paraprofessional
- Karen Stachel, musician
- Mitch Crumblehorn, activist and mayoral candidate in 2005

=== Working Families Party ===
The Working Families Party (WFP) often endorses Democratic Party nominees in general elections even if those nominees did not receive WFP support in their respective Democratic primaries. On May 30, 2025, the WFP endorsed Mamdani. The party instructed voters to rank Mamdani first, with Brad Lander second, Adrienne Adams third, Zellnor Myrie fourth, and Jessica Ramos fifth. Ana María Archila, co-director of the New York WFP, indicated that if Andrew Cuomo won the Democratic mayoral primary, the party would most likely nominate someone other than Cuomo for mayor. On June 6, the WFP removed Ramos from its slate after she endorsed Cuomo.

==== Nominee ====
- Zohran Mamdani, state assemblymember from the 36th district (2021–present)

==== Withdrawn ====
- Gowri Krishna, attorney (Note: Krishna was a placeholder candidate prior to the primary election in order to secure the party's ballot placement.)

=== Conservative Party ===
The Conservative Party normally cross-endorses Republican candidates, as they did at the 2013 and 2017 mayoral elections. Curtis Sliwa described himself as differing with the party on a number of issues, including on abortion, LGBTQ rights, gun control, and COVID-19 restrictions. Paul Briscoe, a Brooklyn resident, had been the Conservative Party's initial selection for mayor, but he rejected the nomination, giving the Conservative Party 72 hours to find a replacement. The party selected Irene Estrada as a replacement candidate. Estrada is not affiliated with the Conservative Party; rather, she is a registered Democrat who was appointed as a member of Bronx Community Board 11 as a Democrat. Estrada had launched several failed campaigns for higher office, including two failed State Assembly bids, two failed City Council bids, and the 2013 New York City Public Advocate election in which she ran as an independent on the "War Veterans" line (Estrada herself is not a veteran). In order to stand as a Conservative while still being a registered Democrat, she needed Wilson Pakula authorization.

==== Nominee ====
- Irene Estrada, former member of Bronx Community Board 11 and Democratic candidate for New York City's 13th City Council district in 2021 and 2023 (Note: Estrada is a registered Democrat, but is running on the Conservative Party line after receiving a Wilson Pakula.)

==== Declined ====
- Paul Briscoe, Conservative candidate for New York's 10th congressional district in 2024.

==== Withdrawn ====
- Gonzalo Duran, vice chair of the Bronx Conservative Party (running for public advocate)

=== Reform Party ===
The Reform Party endorsed Joseph Hernandez, although he appeared on the ballot as an independent.

== Campaign ==
=== Campaign trail ===
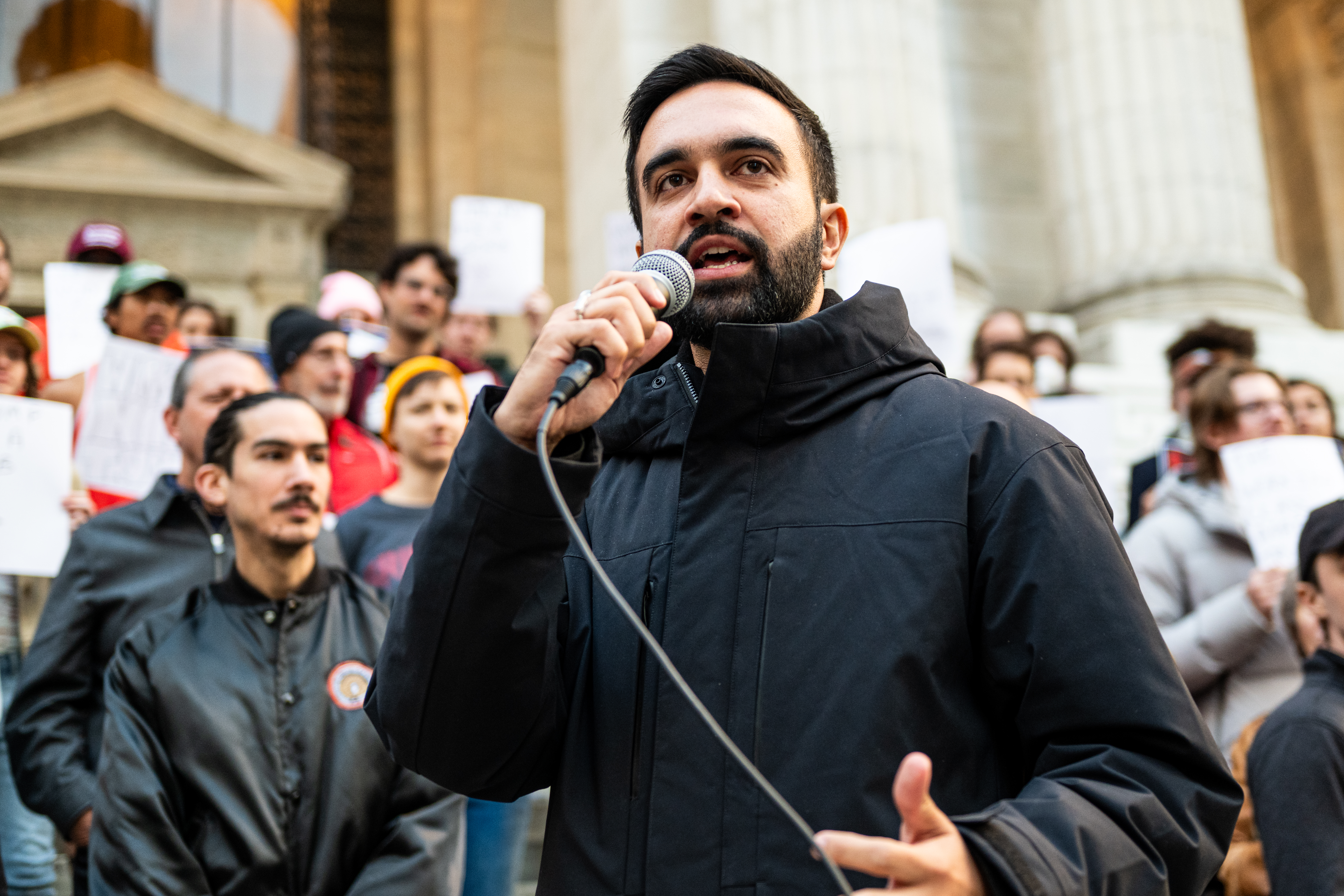
Mamdani in October 2024

After Zohran Mamdani won the Democratic primary in June 2025, several business executives reportedly began meeting with incumbent Eric Adams as they considered backing him in the general election. Jim Walden called for all "non-Mamdani" candidates to "coalesce" around one candidate in the weeks just before the election, in order to prevent vote splitting. Several Republicans in the weeks afterward pressured Curtis Sliwa to drop out in order to shore up support for Adams, but Sliwa repeated on July 7 that he would not. Walden later doubled down, pledging to drop out of the race by September if he was not the leading "non-Mamdani" candidate while giving an interview to CBS News on The Point. Walden would drop out of the race on September 2, again urging for a "one-on-one race" and calling Mamdani the "most dangerous" option for mayor.

On July 1, President Donald Trump voiced support for Adams, describing him as a "very good person" and stating that he "helped him out a little bit"—in reference to his corruption case being dropped by Trump's Department of Justice—while also threatening to arrest Mamdani. During an unrelated press conference, Adams commented that "anyone that is an elected or not should never interfere with federal authorities carrying out their functions". Trump also suggested the possibility of placing New York under federal control if Mamdani wins.

In September 2025, The New York Times began reporting that Adams had allegedly met in Florida with Steve Witkoff, an advisor to Trump, about receiving a position in the president's administration, specifically as an ambassador, in return for him dropping out and increasing the chances of Mamdani being defeated. Later reports suggested that Adams was giving serious consideration to the proposition despite public statements denying it; part of this consideration was whether or not he would have to resign from his position as mayor. Adams initially responded with a statement on September 5 that he would not be withdrawing from the race. Adams later withdrew his candidacy on September 28, stating that his campaign was "underserved, the marginalized, the abandoned and betrayed by government" as both the state and national Democratic parties increasingly coalesced around Mamdani instead of Adams.

Republican candidate Curtis Sliwa, in response to Trump's comments regarding the race, portrayed himself as an anti-Trump Republican, saying that "[Trump] should stay out of [New York politics]", while running a grassroots campaign. By early August, Sliwa began reworking his own personal style and his platform, foregoing his iconic red beret, claiming it had become too much of a "defining issue" distracting from his campaign. Additionally, Sliwa started attempting to court labor unions, portraying himself as pro-worker and anti-fat cat. As the race entered its final weeks, Sliwa came under increasing pressure from Andrew Cuomo, as well as Republican figures including Trump, to drop out of the race to bolster Cuomo's chances; however, he stated he would rather be executed and impaled on a stake than drop out and help Cuomo in any way.

Since launching his independent campaign, Cuomo sought to promote a centrist platform, stating socialism, specifically the brand Mamdani supports, "has never worked anywhere". Cuomo offered milder alternatives to some of Mamdani's policy platforms such as opposing free busses, arguing they would cost $900 million, instead proposing a $180 million bus subsidy paid for by an increased property tax. On August 6, it was reported by The New York Times that Cuomo had a phone call with Trump shortly after Trump met with New York Republicans about who they thought was the most likely candidate to potentially beat Mamdani, with a general consensus of a coalescing around a single candidate instead of a four-way split "non-Mamdani" vote. Cuomo's campaign initially issued a statement that the two did not talk about politics on the call, but later backtracked and claimed that the call never happened. Cuomo reportedly said about Trump, "I know, personally, he doesn't want to fight with me. Personally, I don't want to fight with him, right? So I don't think he's going to be eager to create a conflict with us". Trump formally endorsed Cuomo the day before the election alongside Elon Musk; this was met by dismay from his support base and was described as a "poison pill" and "final nail in the coffin" for his campaign due to just how unpopular both are with New York City Democrats. The endorsement was also seen as the culmination of weeks of campaigning by Cuomo to eat into Sliwa's voter base in order to close the gap with Mamdani, and was generally well received by the City's Republicans.

During his campaign, Mamdani used Hindi commercials and Indian Bollywood music to reach his South Asian American (Desi) voter base. Mamdani's victory in the Democratic primary galvanized the Democratic Socialists of America (DSA) to make more of a push to influence the Democratic Party, with the DSA convention in Chicago on August 7 primarily centered around standing and supporting more Mamdani-like candidates. Mamdani also sought to capitalize on Cuomo's call with Trump, calling it a "betrayal" of Democratic voters, and alleging that Cuomo and Trump are conspiring to "rig" the mayoral election against him, especially as Trump routinely questions Mamdani's status as a U.S. citizen.

=== Campaign controversies ===
In July 2025, The New York Times wrote that on Mamdani's unsuccessful 2009 application to Columbia University, he checked the race boxes "Asian" and "Black or African American". Mamdani confirmed that, but said his intent was to represent his Indian-Ugandan background given the limited options available, and not to improve his chances of admission. Some of Mamdani's opponents described his action as potentially fraudulent, while his defenders said it was legitimate, or at least trivial. Others said variously that it was comparable to Elon Musk claiming to be African American, illustrative of problems with race-conscious admissions, related to the specific history of South Asians in Africa, and a distraction from mayoral issues.

On July 8, four former NYPD officers filed individual suits against Adams and high-ranking NYPD officials. The plaintiffs had each served in leadership roles—chief of detectives, assistant chief of the criminal task force division, chief of professional standards, and second in command for internal affairs—and alleged in part that Adams enabled department corruption and retaliation for speaking out. Less than two weeks later, Tom Donlon, who had served as interim NYPD commissioner, filed suit against Adams and high-ranking NYPD officials, alleging that they had engaged in a "coordinated criminal conspiracy" to enrich themselves, prevented executive misconduct investigations, forged documents, and engaged in retaliation.

In August 2025, Cuomo falsely claimed that Mamdani lived in a rent-controlled apartment, and that Mamdani's tenancy was responsible for the fact that "somewhere last night in New York City, a single mother and her children slept at a homeless shelter." Mamdani responded that when he first began leasing his rent-stabilized apartment, which is not rent-controlled, he earned less than he does now, and he plans to move out in the future. The New York Times and ABC News wrote that Cuomo's attack reflects a larger debate on who should benefit from government regulation of housing costs, with housing experts and tenant advocates immediately panning Cuomo's proposal to means-test rent-stabilized apartments.

In October 2025, the New York Knicks sent a cease-and-desist letter to Mamdani after his campaign launched an ad using a logo with a significant resemblance to that of the Knicks. In a statement, the NBA team said they wanted to make it clear they "do not endorse Mr Mamdani for Mayor", and added that they "will pursue all legal remedies" to prevent further use of their copyrighted logo.

The mispronunciation of Mamdani's name by Cuomo was first noticed during the Democratic mayoral primary debate in 2025. In the general election debates, both Cuomo and Republican contender Curtis Sliwa mispronounced his name. American president Donald Trump and his press secretary Karoline Leavitt also had trouble with the last name. Billionaire Elon Musk intentionally misspelled Mamdani's name in his written endorsement for Cuomo, calling him "Mumdumi or whatever his name is." Even his political allies, such as Letitia James, Bill de Blasio, Carl Heastie, and John Samuelsen have mispronounced the name. Linguistics professor John McWhorter argued that the common mispronunciation of Mamdani's last name was a result of phonological assimilation. Mamdani criticized Cuomo for mispronouncing his names during debates, but also said that he doesn't "begrudge anyone who tries and gets it wrong." He further compared intentional mispronunciation of foreign names to the practice of othering. The Kashmir Times commented that, in contrast to former president Barack Obama, "Mamdani pronounces his own name slowly until others get it right."

==== Allegations of Islamophobia ====
Following his upset win in the Democratic primary, criticisms and attacks against Mamdani utilized Islamophobic, racist, or xenophobic content, and Islamophobic tropes, particularly with references to the 9/11 attacks and terrorism. These criticisms and attacks came from across the political spectrum, and sparked concern and debate over the usage of Islamophobia in mainstream American politics.

A number of Republican politicians attacked Mamdani referencing 9/11. U.S. Representative Nancy Mace wrote on X (formerly Twitter), "After 9/11 we said 'Never Forget.' I think we sadly have forgotten." Representative Marjorie Taylor Greene posted an image of the Statue of Liberty wearing a burqa. Others associated with Trumpism and the MAGA movement, including Laura Loomer, Charlie Kirk, and Donald Trump Jr., also attacked Mamdani in the context of 9/11. The Council on American–Islamic Relations (CAIR) noted a significant increase in Islamophobic content on X the day after Mamdani became the presumptive nominee, which was attributed to commentary from Republican figures. Several Republicans also weaponized Mamdani's immigration status and threatened denaturalization. In a June 27 tweet, Republican U.S. Representative from Tennessee Andy Ogles appealed to Attorney General Pam Bondi to denaturalize and deport Mamdani, calling him "little muhammad [sic]" and "antisemitic, socialist, communist". CAIR condemned Ogles's use of "little muhammad" as Islamophobic and racist. On July 1, Trump suggested without evidence that Mamdani might be in the U.S. illegally, adding that his administration would look into that question. Trump threatened to arrest Mamdani and withhold funding from New York City if he refused to comply with Trump's mass deportations. Trump also suggested a federal takeover of New York City if Mamdani was elected.

During an interview on The Brian Lehrer Show, New York Democratic U.S. senator Kirsten Gillibrand claimed that Mamdani supports violence against Jewish people based on "past positions, particularly references to global jihad". These comments and positions could not be substantiated, and were in many cases contradicted by Mamdani's own statements condemning extremism. Her office later said she "misspoke" and she apologized to Mamdani.

Like Republicans, Democratic figures attacked Mamdani with references to 9/11. Actress and activist Debra Messing, who is a member of the Democratic Party, claimed that Mamdani "celebrates 9/11" and she did not want "a mayor who sides with terrorists". She also connected him with Hamas and the October 7 attacks. A leaked mailer proposal on behalf of Cuomo's donors received backlash for digitally altering a picture of Mamdani to resemble a stereotype of Muslim terrorists. On October 23, while on the WABC radio show Sid and Friends in the Morning, Cuomo asked "God forbid, another 9/11—can you imagine Mamdani in the seat?" Sid Rosenberg replied "He'd be cheering", to which Cuomo laughed and stated "That's another problem". Mamdani condemned the comments as "disgusting".

==== Israeli–Palestinian conflict ====
During the campaign, Mamdani faced scrutiny from political opponents over a 2017 rap lyric in which he said, "My love to the Holy Land Five. You better look 'em up," referring to five leaders of a Muslim charity who were controversially convicted in 2008 of providing material support to Hamas. In June 2025, Republican Tennessee Representative Andy Ogles cited the lyric in calling for Mamdani's denaturalization, while independent candidate Jim Walden criticized the line in a July op-ed. In August, Cuomo cited it to explain why he called Mamdani "pro-Hamas", a characterization The New York Times noted was false.

New York City-area U.S. Representatives Tom Suozzi, Laura Gillen, and Dan Goldman, as well as California U.S. Representative Eric Swalwell, all criticized Mamdani for past remarks about the phrase "globalize the intifada".

French government agency Viginum accused an Israeli influence operation called BlackCore of interference in the election.

==== Allegations of homophobia ====
Both Mamdani and Cuomo's respective records of LGBT rights came under scrutiny. During the primary, several LGBT clubs and organizations reported that Cuomo was ignoring them, including refusing to partake in interviews and questionnaires and skipping mayoral forums by various LGBT clubs and organizations. Several organizations and clubs also accused him of simultaneously "inflating his advocacy" on LGBT rights. Cuomo was criticized by Mamdani for his father's distribution of homophobic campaign posters against Ed Koch – a closeted gay man – in the 1977 mayoral election; Cuomo denied any connection to the signs.

During the campaign, Cuomo repeatedly alleged that Mamdani was homophobic due to his dual citizenship in Uganda, a country with a hostile anti-LGBT record. Cuomo repeated the claims in October after Mamdani was seen in a recently-taken photo with Ugandan first deputy prime minister Rebecca Kadaga, who pushed for legislation that legalized the death penalty for LGBT Ugandans in 2023. Mamdani responded, "Had I known that she was the architect of this horrific legislation and attack on queer Ugandans, I would not have taken it." Mamdani affirmed his support for LGBT New Yorkers throughout his mayoral campaign, including promises to establish New York as an LGBTQ+ sanctuary city, as well as expanding support for the LGBTQ+ community.

== Endorsements ==
Mayoral endorsements by city council district Endorsed Mamdani in primary Endorsed Mamdani after primary Endorsed Cuomo Endorsed Sliwa, then Cuomo Endorsed Sliwa No endorsement

Mayoral endorsements by assembly district Mamdani's assembly district Endorsed Mamdani in primary Endorsed Mamdani after primary Endorsed Cuomo Endorsed Sliwa No endorsement

Mayoral endorsements by state senate district Endorsed Mamdani in primary Endorsed Mamdani after primary Endorsed Cuomo Endorsed Sliwa No endorsement

Mayoral endorsements by U.S. House of Representatives district Endorsed Mamdani in primary Endorsed Mamdani after primary Endorsed Cuomo Endorsed Sliwa Endorsed against Mamdani No endorsement

Andrew Cuomo (I)

2025 mayoral candidates

- Eric Adams, incumbent mayor (2022–2025) (Democratic)
- Jim Walden, antitrust and government law attorney

Executive branch officials

- Bill Clinton, former president of the United States (1993–2001) (Democratic)
- Raymond Kelly, former police commissioner of New York City (1992–1994, 2002–2013) and under secretary of the treasury for terrorism and financial intelligence (1996–1998)
- Ronald Lauder, former U.S. ambassador to Austria (1986–1987) (Republican)
- Stephen Miller, White House deputy chief of staff for policy (2025–2026) and homeland security advisor (2025–2026) (Republican)
- Elon Musk, CEO of Tesla and SpaceX, former senior advisor to the president (2025)
- Donald Trump, president of the United States (2017–2021, 2025–present) (Republican; rejected by candidate)

U.S. senators

- Al D'Amato, former U.S. senator from New York (1981–1999) (Republican)

U.S. representatives

- Anthony D'Esposito, former NY-4 (2023–2025) (Republican)
- Nick Langworthy, NY-23 (2023–present) (Republican)
- Mike Lawler, NY-17 (2023–present) (Republican)
- George Santos, former NY-3 (2023) (Independent; elected as a Republican)
- Tom Suozzi, NY-3 (2017–2023, 2024–present) (Democratic)

Statewide officials

- David Paterson, former governor of New York (2008–2010) (Democratic)
- Robert Abrams, former Attorney General of New York (1979–1993) (Democratic)
- Carl McCall, former New York state comptroller (1993–2002) (Democratic)

State legislators

- Sam Berger, state assemblymember from the 27th district (2023–present) (Democratic)
- Dov Hikind, former state assemblymember from the 48th district (1983–2018) (Republican; elected as a Democrat)
- Hiram Monserrate, former state senator from the 13th district (2009–2010) (Democratic)
- Sam Sutton, state senator from the 22nd district (2025–present) (Democratic)
- Yudelka Tapia, state assemblymember from the 86th district (2021–present) (Democratic)
- Latrice Walker, state assemblymember from the 55th district (2015–present) (Democratic)
- David Weprin, state assemblymember from the 24th district (2010–present) (Democratic)
- Rubén Díaz Sr., former state senator from the 32nd district (2003–2017) and city councilmember from the 18th district (2002–2003, 2018–2021) (Democratic)
- Kalman Yeger, state assemblymember from the 41st district (2025–present) (Democratic)

Local officials

- Michael Bloomberg, businessman and former mayor of New York City (2002–2013) (Democratic; elected as a Republican) (Note: First elected as a Republican in 2001, switched to being an independent in 2007, returned to the Democratic Party in 2018)
- James Gennaro, city councilmember from the 24th district (2021–present) (Democratic)
- Randy Mastro, first deputy mayor of New York (2025)
- Inna Vernikov, former minority whip of the New York City Council (2022–2025) from the 48th district (2021–present) (Republican)

Individuals

- Bill Ackman, CEO of Pershing Square Capital Management
- Woody Allen, filmmaker (Democratic)
- Emily Austin, journalist (Republican)
- Danielle Bernstein, american fashion designer
- Jeff Blau, CEO of Related Companies
- John Catsimatidis, CEO of Gristedes and D'Agostino Supermarkets (Republican)
- Bo Dietl, media personality
- Michael Rapaport, actor
- Sid Rosenberg, radio personality (Republican)
- Amy Schumer, actress (Democratic)
- Eric Trump, businessman and son of Donald Trump (Republican)
- Elisha Wiesel, hedge fund manager and son of Elie Wiesel
- Phil Wong, budget director for Robert Holden and Democratic nominee for New York City's 30th City Council district (co-endorsement with Sliwa)

Labor unions

- Amalgamated Transit Union Local 726
- Amalgamated Transit Union New York State Legislative Conference Board
- International Brotherhood of Electrical Workers Local 3
- New York City Coalition of the International Union of Operating Engineers
- Teamsters Joint Council 16
- Teamsters Local 237

Organizations

- No Labels

Political parties

- Liberal Party of New York

Newspapers and other media

- New York Daily News
- The New York Sun
- Staten Island Advance
- 77 WABC
Zohran Mamdani (D)

2025 mayoral candidates

- Adrienne Adams, speaker of the New York City Council (2022–2025) from the 28th district (2017–2025)
- Michael Blake, former state assemblymember from the 79th district (2015–2021)
- Brad Lander, New York City comptroller (2021–2025)
- Zellnor Myrie, state senator from the 20th district (2019–present)

Executive branch officials

- Kamala Harris, former vice president of the United States (2021–2025)
- Lina Khan, former chair of the Federal Trade Commission (2021–2025)
- Robert Reich, former U.S. secretary of labor (1993–1997)
- Bill Kristol, former chief of staff to Vice President Dan Quayle (1989–1993) (Independent)

U.S. senators

- Bernie Sanders, U.S. senator from Vermont (2007–present) (Independent)
- Chris Van Hollen, U.S. senator from Maryland (2017–present)
- Elizabeth Warren, U.S. senator from Massachusetts (2013–present)
- Chris Murphy, U.S. senator from Connecticut (2009–present)

U.S. representatives

- Jamaal Bowman, former NY-16 (2021–2025)
- Yvette Clarke, NY-9 (2013–present), NY-11 (2007–2013)
- Adriano Espaillat, NY-13 (2017–present) and chair of the Congressional Hispanic Caucus (2025–present)
- Pramila Jayapal, WA-7 (2017–present)
- Hakeem Jeffries, NY-8 (2013–present) and House Minority Leader (2023–present)
- Ro Khanna, CA-17 (2017–present)
- Summer Lee, PA-12 (2023–present)
- Jerry Nadler, NY-12 (1992–present)
- Alexandria Ocasio-Cortez, NY-14 (2019–present)
- Jamie Raskin, MD-8 (2017–present)
- Pat Ryan, NY-18 (2022–present)
- Rashida Tlaib, MI-12 (2019–present)
- Nydia Velázquez, NY-7 (1993–present)

Statewide officials

- Antonio Delgado, lieutenant governor of New York (2022–present)
- Thomas DiNapoli, state comptroller of New York (2007–present)
- Keith Ellison, attorney general of Minnesota (2019–present)
- Kathy Hochul, governor of New York (2021–present)
- Letitia James, attorney general of New York (2019–present)
- Wes Moore, governor of Maryland (2023–present)

State legislators

- Jamaal Bailey, state senator from the 36th district (2017–present) and Chair of the Bronx Democratic Party (2020–present)
- Carl Heastie, Speaker of the New York State Assembly from the 83rd district (2001–present)
- Rodneyse Bichotte Hermelyn, state assemblymember from the 42nd district (2015–present) and Chair of the Brooklyn Democratic Party (2020–present)
- Andrea Stewart-Cousins, Majority Leader of the New York State Senate (2019–present) from the 35th district (2007–present)
- 15 other current state senators (Note: Jabari Brisport, state senator from the 25th district (2021–present); Samra Brouk, state senator from the 55th district (2021–present); Nathalia Fernandez, state senator from the 34th district (2023–present); Michael Gianaris, state senator from the 12th district (2011–present) and Senate Deputy majority leader (2019–present); Kristen Gonzalez, state senator from the 59th district (2023–present); Andrew Gounardes, state senator from the 26th district (2019–present); Brad Hoylman-Sigal, state senator from the 47th district (2013–present) and nominee for Manhattan borough president in 2025; Robert Jackson, state senator from the 31st district (2019–present); Liz Krueger, state senator from the 28th district (2002–present); John Liu, state senator from the 16th district (2019–present); Gustavo Rivera, state senator from the 33rd district (2011–present); Julia Salazar, state senator from the 18th district (2019–present); James Sanders Jr., state senator from the 10th district (2013–present); Luis R. Sepúlveda, state senator from the 32nd district (2018–present); José M. Serrano, state senator from the 29th district (2005–present))
- 27 other current state assemblymembers (Note: George Alvarez, state assemblymember from the 78th district (2023–present); Khaleel Anderson, state assemblymember from the 31st district (2020–present); Alex Bores, state assemblymember from the 73rd district (2023–present); Robert Carroll, state assemblymember from the 44th district (2017–present); Monique Chandler-Waterman, state assemblymember from the 58th district (2022–present); Catalina Cruz, state assemblymember from the 39th district (2019–present); Brian Cunningham, state assemblymember from the 43rd district (2022–present); Landon Dais, state assemblymember from the 77th district (2024–present); Maritza Davila, state assemblymember from the 53rd district (2013–present); Manny De Los Santos, state assemblymember from the 72nd district (2022–present); Harvey Epstein, state assemblymember from the 74th district (2018–present) and nominee for New York City's 2nd City Council district in 2025; Phara Souffrant Forrest, state assemblymember from the 57th district (2021–present); Emily Gallagher, state assemblymember from the 50th district (2021–present); Jessica González-Rojas, state assemblymember from the 34th district (2021–present); Micah Lasher, state assemblymember from the 69th district (2025–present); Marcela Mitaynes, state assemblymember from the 51st district (2021–present); Steven Raga, state assemblymember from the 30th district (2023–present); Karines Reyes, state assemblymember from the 87th district (2019–present); Amanda Septimo, state assemblymember from the 84th district (2021–present); Sarahana Shrestha, state assemblymember from the 103rd district (2023–present); Jo Anne Simon, state assemblymember from the 52nd district (2015–present); Tony Simone, state assemblymember from the 75th district (2023–present); Al Taylor, state assemblyman from the 71st district (2017–present); Emerita Torres, state assemblymember from the 85th district (2025–present); Claire Valdez, state assemblymember from the 37th district (2025–present); Clyde Vanel, state assemblymember from the 33rd district (2017–present); Jordan Wright, state assemblyman from the 70th district (2025–present))
- 2 former state legislators (Note: Thomas Duane, former state senator from the 29th district (1999–2012); Richard Gottfried, former state assemblymember from the 75th district (1971–2022))

Local officials

- Ras Baraka, mayor of Newark, New Jersey (2014–present)
- Bill de Blasio, former mayor of New York City (2014–2021)
- Amanda Farías, Majority Leader of the New York City Council from the 18th district (2022–present)
- Rodney Harrison, former NYPD chief (2021)
- Mark Levine, Manhattan borough president (2022–present) and nominee for New York City comptroller in 2025
- Ydanis Rodríguez, Commissioner of the New York City Department of Transportation (2022–present)
- 24 other current city councilmembers (Note: Shaun Abreu, city councilmember from the 7th district (2022–present); Alexa Avilés, city councilmember from the 38th district (2022–present); Diana Ayala, city councilmember from the 8th district (2018–present); Erik Bottcher, city councilmember from the 3rd district (2022–present); Justin Brannan, city councilmember from the 47th district (2018–present); Tiffany Cabán, city councilmember from the 22nd district (2021–present); Carmen De La Rosa, city councilmember from the 10th district (2022–present); Oswald Feliz, city councilmember from the 15th district (2021–present); Jennifer Gutiérrez, city councilmember from the 34th district (2022–present); Shahana Hanif, city councilmember from the 39th district (2022–present); Crystal Hudson, city councilmember from the 35th district (2022–present); Rita Joseph, city councilmember from the 40th district (2022–present); Shekar Krishnan, city councilmember from the 25th district (2022–present); Farah Louis, city councilmember from the 45th district (2019–present); Chris Marte, city councilmember from the 1st district (2022–present); Sandy Nurse, city councilmember from the 37th district (2022–present); Chi Ossé, city councilmember from the 36th district (2022–present); Keith Powers, city councilmember from the 4th district (2018–present); Lincoln Restler, city councilmember from the 33rd district (2022–present); Kevin Riley, city councilmember from the 12th district (2021–present); Yusef Salaam, city councilmember from the 9th district (2024–present); Pierina Sanchez, city councilmember from the 14th district (2022–present); Jumaane Williams, New York City public advocate (2019–present); Julie Won, city councilmember from the 26th district (2022–present))
- 3 former city councilmembers (Note: Sal Albanese, former city councilmember from the 43rd district (1983–1998); Rafael Espinal, city councilmember from the 37th district (2014–2020); Debi Rose, former city councilmember from the 49th district (2010–2021))
- 3 current Borough Presidents (Note: Vanessa Gibson, Bronx Borough President (2022–present); Antonio Reynoso, Brooklyn Borough President (2022–present); Donovan Richards, Queens Borough President (2020–present))
- 1 former Borough President (Note: Ruth Messinger, former Manhattan Borough President (1990–1997) and nominee for mayor in 1997)

Party officials

- Howard Dean, former chair of the Democratic National Committee (2005–2009), governor of Vermont (1991–2003), and Democratic presidential candidate in 2004
- David Hogg, former vice chair of the Democratic National Committee (2025)
- Ken Martin, chair of the Democratic National Committee (2025–present)
- Keith Wright, chair of the Manhattan Democratic Party (2009–present)

International politicians

- Jeremy Corbyn, member of the House of Commons for Islington North (Your Party)
- Jean-Luc Mélenchon, former deputy for Bouches-du-Rhône's 4th constituency (2017–2022) (LFI)
- Jugnu Mohsin, former Punjab Provincial Assembly member from PP-184 Okara-II (2018–2023) (PMLN)
- Yanis Varoufakis, former Minister of Finance of Greece (2015) (MeRA25)
- Ahmad Tibi, MK (Note: Member of the Knesset. Tibi has represented Balad, Ta'al and the Joint List during his tenure.) (1999–present) and former Deputy Speaker of the Knesset (2006–2022) (Ta'al)

Individuals

- Kurt Andersen, author
- Natalie Anderson, television personality
- Ana Maria Archila, co-director of the New York Working Families Party
- Rowan Blanchard, actress
- Ben Burgis, professor
- Lizzy Caplan, actress
- Julian Casablancas, lead singer of The Strokes and The Voidz
- Ha-Joon Chang, professor
- Natasha Cloud, professional basketball player
- Laverne Cox, actress
- Plasma, drag queen
- Brita Filter, drag queen
- Lucy Dacus, singer-songwriter
- Aria Dean, artist
- Steven Donziger, environmental attorney
- John Early, comedian
- Cole Escola, comedian
- Ella Emhoff, fashion designer and stepdaughter of former Vice President Kamala Harris
- Shawn Fain, president of United Auto Workers (2023–present)
- Jane Fonda, actress
- James Galbraith, professor
- Jayati Ghosh, professor
- Ilana Glazer, comedian
- Carol Greene, art dealer
- Stavros Halkias, comedian
- Sam Haselby, senior editor of Aeon Magazine
- Mehwish Hayat, actress
- Moshe Indig, rabbi and political influencer
- Poorna Jagannathan, producer
- Swati Khurana, contemporary artist
- The Kid Mero, writer and comedian
- Sharon Kleinbaum, rabbi
- Khalid Latif, imam
- MJ Lenderman, singer-songwriter
- Spike Lee, filmmaker
- Lorde, singer-songwriter
- Sonia Manzano, actress
- Clara Mattei, professor
- Bill McKibben, environmentalist
- Sarah McNally, owner of McNally Jackson Books
- Kenice Mobley, comedian
- Mira Nair, filmmaker (candidate's mother)
- Nick Mullen, comedian
- Hari Nef, actress
- Cynthia Nixon, actor
- Lynn Nottage, playwright
- Lupita Nyong'o, actress
- Olayemi Olurin, attorney
- Gabriel Palma, professor
- Mandy Patinkin, actor
- Kal Penn, actor and former associate director of the White House Office of Public Engagement and Intergovernmental Affairs (2009–2011)
- Ann Pettifor, co-founder of Jubilee 2000
- Hasan Piker, political commentator
- Ben Platt, actor
- Kareem Rahma, comedian
- Emily Ratajkowski, actress
- AnnaSophia Robb, actress
- Maggie Rogers, singer-songwriter
- Alison Roman, chef
- John Samuelsen, International President of Transport Workers Union of America (2017–present)
- Jack Schlossberg, political writer
- Ser Serpas, visual artist
- Ali Sethi, singer
- Sarah Sherman, comedian
- Aru Shiney-Ajay, executive director of Sunrise Movement (2023–present)
- Gianmarco Soresi, comedian
- Morgan Spector, actor
- Michael Stipe, singer-songwriter
- Martine Syms, filmmaker
- Shaina Taub, actress
- Amalia Ulman, film director
- Sunita Viswanath, co-founder of Women for Afghan Women and Hindus for Human Rights
- Brandon Wardell, comedian
- Isabella Weber, professor
- Jennifer Welch, political commentator
- Maya Wiley, president and CEO of the Leadership Conference on Civil and Human Rights
- Bowen Yang, comedian
- Jaboukie Young-White, comedian
- Ramy Youssef, actor

Party chapters

- Bronx Democratic Party
- Brooklyn Democratic Party
- Manhattan Democratic Party
- Staten Island Democratic Party

Labor unions

- 1199SEIU United Healthcare Workers East
- Actors' Equity Association
- American Federation of Musicians Local 802
- Committee of Interns and Residents
- Communications Workers of America District 1
- District Council 37
- Doctors Council Service Employees International Union
- Hotel and Gaming Trades Council
- International Alliance of Theatrical Stage Employees Local 161
- New York City Central Labor Council
- New York State Nurses Association
- Office and Professional Employees International Union Local 153
- Professional Staff Congress
- SEIU 32BJ
- Teamsters Local 804
- UNITE HERE Local 100
- United Auto Workers Region 9A
- United Federation of Teachers
- Workers United New York New Jersey Regional Joint Board

Organizations

- Bend the Arc Jewish Action
- Brooklyn Young Democrats
- Citizen Action of New York
- Climate Defiance
- College Democrats of America (Note: Joint endorsement with its New York state affiliate, as well as its Fordham University and New York University chapters.)
- CAIR Action
- Emgage Action
- Freelancers Union
- Gen-Z for Change
- IfNotNow (national and city chapters)
- Indivisible
- Jewish Voice for Peace Action
- Jews for Racial and Economic Justice
- Make the Road Action
- MoveOn
- New American Leaders Action Fund
- New York City Democratic Socialists of America
- New York Communities for Change
- People For the American Way
- Our Revolution
- Planned Parenthood of Greater New York Votes PAC
- Progressive Change Campaign Committee
- Sierra Club
- Sunrise Movement (national and city chapters)
- Three chapters of Stonewall Democrats (Note: Second choice endorsements from Jim Owles Liberal Democratic Club and Lambda Independent Democrats of Brooklyn, and third choice endorsement from the NYC chapter.)
- The People for Bernie Sanders
- Working Families Party

Newspapers

- Aftermath
- Columbia Daily Spectator
- El Diario
- Red Hook Star-Revue
- The Nation
- Washington Square News
Curtis Sliwa (R)

Executive branch officials

- Larry Kudlow, former director of the National Economic Council (2018–2021)

U.S. representatives

- ~~Mike Lawler, NY-17 (2023–present)~~ (switched endorsement to Cuomo)
- Elise Stefanik, NY-21 (2015–present)

Statewide officials

- Betsy McCaughey, former lieutenant governor of New York (1995–1998)
- George Pataki, former governor of New York (1995–2006)

State assemblymembers

- ~~Dov Hikind, former state assemblymember from the 48th district (1983–2018)~~ (switched endorsement to Cuomo)
- Sam Pirozzolo, state assemblymember from the 63rd district (2023–present)
- Michael Reilly, state assemblymember from the 62nd district (2019–present)
- Michael Tannousis, state assemblymember from the 64th district (2021–present) and chair of the Staten Island Republican Party (2022–present)
- Jaime Williams, state assemblymember from the 59th district (2016–present) (Democratic)

Local officials

- Joann Ariola, minority leader of the New York City Council (2025–present) from the 32nd district (2022–present)
- David Carr, former minority leader of the New York City Council (2025) from the 50th district (2021–present)
- Rudy Giuliani, former Mayor of New York City (1994–2001)
- Robert Holden, city councilmember from the 30th district (2018–present) (Democratic)
- ~~Raymond Kelly, New York City Police Commissioner (1992–1994, 2002–2013)~~ (switched endorsement to Cuomo)
- Kristy Marmorato, city councilmember from the 13th district (2024–present)
- Frank Morano, city councilmember from the 51st district (2025–present)
- Vickie Paladino, city councilmember from the 19th district (2022–present), Minority Whip of the New York City Council (2025–present)
- ~~Inna Vernikov, city councilmember from the 48th district (2021–present), Minority Whip of the New York City Council (2022–2025)~~ (switched endorsement to Cuomo)

Party officials

- Edward F. Cox, chair of the New York Republican Party (2009–2019, 2023–present)

Individuals

- ~~John Catsimatidis, CEO of Gristedes and D'Agostino Supermarkets~~ (switched endorsement to Cuomo)
- Naked Cowboy, street performer
- ~~Bo Dietl, media personality (Independent)~~ (switched endorsement to Cuomo)
- Scott LoBaido, artist
- ~~Sid Rosenberg, radio personality~~ (switched endorsement to Cuomo)
- Joe Tacopina, criminal defense lawyer
- Phil Wong, budget director for Robert Holden and Democratic nominee for New York City's 30th City Council district (co-endorsement with Cuomo)

Party chapters

- Bronx Republican Party
- Brooklyn Republican Party
- Manhattan Republican Party
- Queens Republican Party
- Rockland County Conservative Party
- Rockland County Republican Party
- Staten Island Republican Party

Organizations

- New York Young Republican Club
Joseph Hernandez (I)

Political parties

- Reform Party
- Reform Party of New York State
Eric Adams (I) (withdrawn)

U.S. representatives

- ~~George Santos, former NY-3 (2023) (Independent)~~ (switched endorsement to Cuomo)

Statewide officials

- ~~David Paterson, former governor of New York (2008–2010) (Democratic)~~ (switched endorsement to Cuomo) (Note: Previously endorsed Walden before the Democratic primary, then switched to endorsing Cuomo during the primary)

State legislators

- Inez Dickens, former state assemblymember from the 70th district (2017–2025) (Democratic)
- Diane Savino, former state senator from the 23rd district (2005–2022) (Democratic)
- Malcolm Smith, former state senator from the 14th district (2003–2014) (Democratic)

Local officials

- Joe Borelli, former minority leader of the New York City Council (2021–2025) from the 51st district (2015–2025) (Republican)
- Fernando Cabrera, former city councilmember from the 14th district (2010–2021) (Democratic)
- ~~James Gennaro, city councilmember from the 24th district (2002–2013, 2021–present) (Democratic)~~ (switched endorsement to Cuomo)
- James Oddo, former Staten Island borough president (2014–2021) (Republican)

Individuals

- ~~Bill Ackman, CEO of Pershing Square Capital Management~~ (switched endorsement to Cuomo)
- ~~John Catsimatidis, CEO of Gristedes and D'Agostino Supermarkets (Republican)~~ (switched endorsement to Sliwa, then to Cuomo)
- Ann Coulter, political commentator (Republican)
- Herbert Daughtry, pastor
- Jeffrey Gural, real estate developer
- Ingrid Lewis-Martin, former chief advisor to the mayor of New York City (2022–2024) (Democratic)
- Fernando Mateo, restaurant and construction company owner (Republican)

Labor unions

- Communications Workers of America Local 1182
- Correction Officers' Benevolent Association
- Detectives' Endowment Association
- International Brotherhood of Teamsters Local 831
- Sergeants Benevolent Association

Newspapers

- New York Post
Jim Walden (I) (withdrawn)

Executive branch officials

- Richard Donoghue, former acting U.S. deputy attorney general (2020–2021) (Republican)
- Seth DuCharme, former acting U.S. attorney for the Eastern District of New York (2020–2021)
- Debra Wong Yang, former U.S. attorney for the Central District of California (2002–2006) (Republican)

Statewide officials

- ~~David Paterson, former governor of New York (2008–2010) (Democratic)~~ (Note: Switched to endorsing Cuomo in the Democratic primary, then endorsed Adams)

Local officials

- James Leonard, former New York City Fire Department chief (2014–2018)
- David Soares, former Albany County district attorney (2005–2024) (Democratic)
- Cyrus Vance Jr., former Manhattan district attorney (2010–2022) (Democratic)

Individuals

- Molly Bloom, entrepreneur
- Bobby Shmurda, rapper
Declined to endorse

U.S. senators

- Cory Booker, U.S. senator from New Jersey (2013–present) (Democratic)
- Kirsten Gillibrand, U.S. senator from New York (2009–present) (Democratic)
- Chuck Schumer, U.S. senator from New York (1999–present) and Senate Minority Leader (Democratic)

U.S. representatives

- Laura Gillen, NY-4 (2025–present) (Democratic) (endorsed against Mamdani)
- Josh Gottheimer, NJ-5 (2017–present) (Democratic) (endorsed against Mamdani)
- George Latimer, NY-16 (2025–present) (Democratic)
- Gregory Meeks, NY-5 (1998–present) (Democratic)
- Josh Riley, NY-19 (2025–present) (Democratic)
- Mikie Sherrill, former NJ-11 (2019–2026) and governor of New Jersey (2026–present) (Democratic)
- Ritchie Torres, NY-15 (2021–present) (Democratic) (endorsed against Mamdani)

State legislators

- Jeffrey Dinowitz, state assemblymember from the 81st district (1994–present) (Democratic)

Local officials

- Eric Dinowitz, city councilmember from the 11th district (2021–present) (Democratic)
- Lynn Schulman, city councilmember from the 29th district (2022–present) (Democratic)

Party chapters

- Queens Democratic Party

Party officials

- Jay Jacobs, chair of the New York State Democratic Party (2019–present) (Democratic) (endorsed against Mamdani)
- Andrew Yang, entrepreneur, chair of the Forward Party (2022–present) (Forward)

== Polling ==
=== Aggregate polls ===
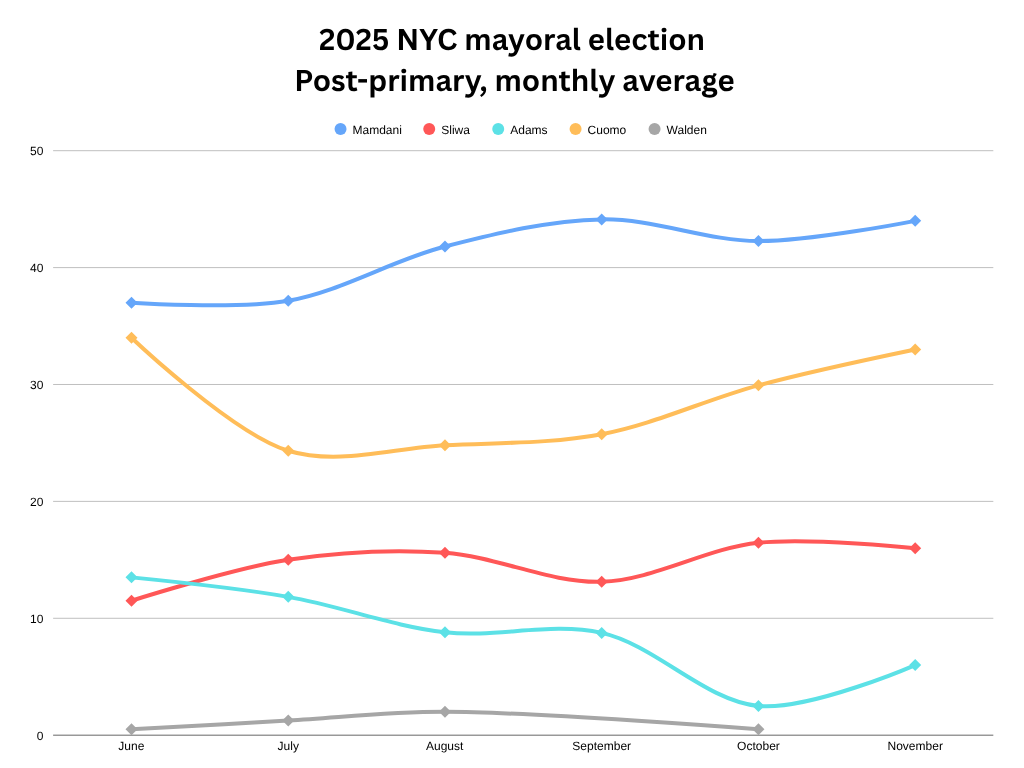
Monthly average of polling

| Source of poll aggregation | Dates administered | Dates updated | Andrew Cuomo (I) | Zohran Mamdani (D) | Curtis Sliwa (R) | Undecided/ Other | Lead |
|---|---|---|---|---|---|---|---|
| Decision Desk HQ | June 16 – November 2, 2025 | November 3, 2025 | 33.7% | 44.4% | 18.0% | 3.9% | 10.7 |
| RealClearPolitics | October 22 – November 2, 2025 | November 3, 2025 | 31.8% | 46.1% | 16.3% | 5.8% | 14.3 |
| Race to the WH | June 25 – November 2, 2025 | November 4, 2025 | 32.2% | 45.8% | 16.1% | 5.9% (Note: Walden with 2%) | 13.6 |
| Average | | | 32.6% | 45.4% | 16.8% | 5.2% | 12.9 |

=== General election polls ===
| Poll source | Date(s) administered | Sample size (Note: Key: A – all adults RV – registered voters LV – likely voters V – unclear) | Margin of error | Eric Adams (I) | Andrew Cuomo (I) | Zohran Mamdani (D) | Curtis Sliwa (R) | Jim Walden (I) | Other | Undecided | Lead |
|---|---|---|---|---|---|---|---|---|---|---|---|
| AtlasIntel | October 31 – November 2, 2025 | 2,404 (LV) | ± 2.0% | 6% | 33% | 44% | 16% | — | 1% (Note: "Would not vote" and "Other candidate" with 0.3%) | 1% | 11 |
| AtlasIntel | October 31 – November 2, 2025 | 2,404 (LV) | ± 2.0% | — | 39% | 44% | 15% | — | 0% | 1% | 5 |
| AtlasIntel | October 31 – November 2, 2025 | 2,404 (LV) | ± 2.0% | — | 50% | 44% | — | — | 5% (Note: "Would not vote" with 5%) | 1% | 6 |
| AtlasIntel | October 25–30, 2025 | 1,587 (LV) | ± 3.0% | 7% | 26% | 40% | 24% | — | 2% (Note: "Would not vote" and "Other candidate" with 1%) | 1% | 24 |
| AtlasIntel | October 25–30, 2025 | 1,587 (LV) | ± 3.0% | — | 34% | 41% | 24% | — | 1% (Note: "Would not vote" with 1%) | 1% | 10 |
| AtlasIntel | October 25–30, 2025 | 1,587 (LV) | ± 3.0% | — | 50% | 42% | — | — | 7% (Note: "Would not vote" with 7%) | 4% | 8 |
| Beacon Research (D)/Shaw & Company Research (R) (Note: This poll was sponsored by Fox News.) | October 24–28, 2025 | 1,107 (RV) | ± 3.0% | 2% | 31% | 45% | 16% | — | 3% | 3% | 14 |
| Beacon Research (D)/Shaw & Company Research (R) | October 24–28, 2025 | 1,107 (RV) | ± 3.0% | — | 40% | 47% | — | — | 10% (Note: "Someone else" with 8%; "Wouldn't vote" with 2%) | 4% | 7 |
| Beacon Research (D)/Shaw & Company Research (R) | October 24–28, 2025 | 971 (LV) | ± 3.0% | 2% | 31% | 47% | 15% | — | 2% | 3% | 16 |
| Beacon Research (D)/Shaw & Company Research (R) | October 24–28, 2025 | 971 (LV) | ± 3.0% | — | 39% | 49% | — | — | 9% (Note: "Someone else" with 7%; "Wouldn't vote" with 2%) | 4% | 10 |
| Marist University | October 24–28, 2025 | 1,019 (RV) | ± 3.7% | — | 32% | 46% | 16% | — | — | 5% | 14 |
| Marist University | October 24–28, 2025 | 1,019 (RV) | ± 3.7% | — | 43% | 50% | — | — | 2% | 5% | 7 |
| Marist University | October 24–28, 2025 | 1,019 (RV) | ± 3.7% | — | — | 59% | 33% | — | 5% | 5% | 26 |
| Marist University | October 24–28, 2025 | 792 (LV) | ± 4.2% | — | 32% | 48% | 16% | — | — | 3% | 16 |
| Marist University | October 24–28, 2025 | 792 (LV) | ± 4.2% | — | 44% | 51% | — | — | 2% | 3% | 7 |
| Marist University | October 24–28, 2025 | 792 (LV) | ± 4.2% | — | — | 59% | 33% | — | 5% | 3% | 26 |
| Emerson College (Note: This poll was sponsored by WPIX and The Hill.) | October 25–27, 2025 | 640 (LV) | ± 3.8% | — | 25% | 50% | 21% | — | 1% | 4% | 25 |
| Emerson College | October 25–27, 2025 | 640 (LV) | ± 3.8% | 1% (Note: With voters who lean towards a given candidate) | 26% | 51% | 21% | 2% | 3% | — | 25 |
| Quinnipiac University | October 23–27, 2025 | 911 (LV) | ± 4.0% | — | 33% | 43% | 14% | — | 3% (Note: "Refused" with 3%) | 6% | 10 |
| J.L. Partners (Note: This poll was sponsored by the Daily Mail.) | October 23–26, 2025 | 500 (RV) | ± 4.4% | 1% | 29% | 42% | 19% | — | 1% (Note: "Someone else" with 1%) | 8% | 13 |
| Suffolk University | October 23–26, 2025 | 500 (LV) | ± 4.4% | 2% | 34% | 44% | 11% | <1% | 3% (Note: Refused with 3%; Estrada and Hernandez with <1%) | 7% | 10 |
| Manhattan Institute (R) | October 22–26, 2025 | 600 (LV) | ± 4.0% | 1% | 28% | 43% | 19% | — | 1% (Note: "Someone else" with 1%) | 8% | 15 |
| Manhattan Institute (R) | October 22–26, 2025 | 600 (LV) | ± 4.0% | — | 40% | 44% | — | — | 11% (Note: "Someone else" with 11%) | 6% | 4 |
| Manhattan Institute (R) | October 22–26, 2025 | 600 (LV) | ± 4.0% | — | — | 47% | 33% | — | 13% (Note: "Someone else" with 13%) | 7% | 14 |
| Victory Insights (R) | October 22–23, 2025 | 500 (LV) | — | — | 29% | 47% | 16% | — | — | 9% | 18 |
| Victory Insights (R) | October 22–23, 2025 | 500 (LV) | — | — | 39% | 49% | — | — | — | 13% | 10 |
| Victory Insights (R) | October 22–23, 2025 | 500 (LV) | — | — | — | 49% | 41% | — | — | 11% | 8 |
| Zenith Research (D) (Note: This poll was sponsored by Yes On Affordable Housing, which supports ballot measures 2, 3, 4, and 5.) | October 14–20, 2025 | 836 (LV) | ± 3.4% | — | 29% | 45% | 16% | — | — | 10% | 16 |
| Patriot Polling (R) | October 18–19, 2025 | 715 (LV) | ± 3.0% | — | 32% | 43% | 19% | — | — | 6% | 11 |
| Gotham Polling & Analytics (Note: This poll was sponsored by AARP New York.) | October 14–15, 2025 | 1,040 (LV) | ± 4.0% | — | 29% | 43% | 19% | — | 1% | 8% | 14 |
| Gotham Polling & Analytics | October 14–15, 2025 | 1,040 (LV) | ± 4.0% | — | 41% | 45% | — | — | 15% | | 4 |
| Gotham Polling & Analytics | October 14–15, 2025 | 1,040 (LV) | ± 4.0% | — | — | 47% | 32% | — | 22% | | 15 |
| Beacon Research (D)/Shaw & Company Research (R) | October 14–15, 2025 | 1,003 (RV) | ± 3.0% | 3% | 28% | 49% | 13% | — | 3% | 4% | 21 |
| Beacon Research (D)/Shaw & Company Research (R) | October 14–15, 2025 | 793 (LV) | ± 3.5% | 2% | 28% | 52% | 14% | — | 2% | 3% | 24 |
| Quinnipiac University | October 3–7, 2025 | 1,015 (LV) | ± 3.9% | — | 33% | 46% | 15% | — | 3% (Note: "Refused" with 2%) | 3% | 13 |
| | September 28, 2025 | Adams withdraws from the race | | | | | | | | | |
| Beacon Research (D)/Shaw & Company Research (R) | September 18–22, 2025 | 1,003 (RV) | ± 3.0% | 8% | 27% | 45% | 11% | — | 1% (Note: "Wouldn't vote" with 1%) | 5% | 18 |
| Beacon Research (D)/Shaw & Company Research (R) | September 18–22, 2025 | 813 (LV) | ± 3.5% | 7% | 29% | 47% | 11% | — | — | 4% | 18 |
| Suffolk University | September 16–18, 2025 | 500 (LV) | ± 4.4% | 8% | 25% | 45% | 9% | 4% (Note: Refused with 3%; Estrada, Hernandez, and Walden combined with 1%) | | 9% | 20 |
| YouGov/CBS News | September 7–13, 2025 | 1,903 (RV) | ± 2.7% | 6% | 28% | 43% | 15% | — | — | 8% | 15 |
| YouGov/CBS News | September 7–13, 2025 | 1,903 (RV) | ± 2.7% | — (Note: If Adams' voters are reallocated to their second choice) | 30% | 44% | 17% | — | — | 9% | 14 |
| Marist University | September 8–11, 2025 | 885 (LV) | ± 4.1% | 9% | 24% | 45% | 17% | — | — | 5% | 21 |
| Marist University | September 8–11, 2025 | 885 (LV) | ± 4.1% | — | 30% | 46% | 18% | — | 2% | 4% | 16 |
| Marist University | September 8–11, 2025 | 885 (LV) | ± 4.1% | — | 39% | 49% | — | — | 7% | 5% | 10 |
| Emerson College | September 7–8, 2025 | 1,000 (A) | ± 3.9% | 7% | 28% | 43% | 10% | — | — | 9% | 15 |
| Emerson College | September 7–8, 2025 | 1,000 (A) | ± 3.9% | — | 40% | 47% | — | — | — | 13% | 7 |
| Emerson College | September 7–8, 2025 | 1,000 (A) | ± 3.9% | — | — | 52% | 28% | — | — | 20% | 24 |
| Emerson College | September 7–8, 2025 | 1,000 (A) | ± 3.9% | 30% | — | 51% | — | — | — | 19% | 21 |
| Quinnipiac University | September 4–8, 2025 | 967 (LV) | ± 3.9% | 12% | 23% | 45% | 15% | — | 1% | 4% | 22 |
| Quinnipiac University | September 4–8, 2025 | 967 (LV) | ± 3.9% | — | 30% | 46% | 17% | — | 2% | 5% | 16 |
| Public Policy Polling (D) (Note: This poll was sponsored by Decriminalize Sex Work.) | September 4–5, 2025 | 556 (RV) | ± 4.2% | 12% | 25% | 39% | 13% | — | — | 11% | 14 |
| New York Times/Siena College | September 2–6, 2025 | 1,284 (LV) | ± 3.6% | 9% | 24% | 46% | 15% | — | — | 5% | 22 |
| New York Times/Siena College | September 2–6, 2025 | 1,284 (LV) | ± 3.6% | — | 44% | 48% | — | — | — | 7% | 4 |
| New York Times/Siena College | September 2–6, 2025 | 1,284 (LV) | ± 3.6% | 36% | — | 55% | — | — | — | 9% | 19 |
| | September 2, 2025 | Walden withdraws from the race | | | | | | | | | |
| UMass Lowell/YouGov | August 19 – September 2, 2025 | 800 (LV) | ± 4.6% | 8% | 25% | 44% | 15% | 2% | 0.5% | 7% | 19 |
| American Pulse Research & Polling | August 14–19, 2025 | 638 (LV) | ± 3.9% | 11% | 25% | 37% | 17% | 2% | 1% | 8% | 12 |
| American Pulse Research & Polling | August 14–19, 2025 | 638 (LV) | ± 3.9% | 20% | 32% | 38% | — | — | 9% | — | 6 |
| American Pulse Research & Polling | August 14–19, 2025 | 638 (LV) | ± 3.9% | — | 30% | 39% | 23% | — | — | 8% | 9 |
| Tulchin Research (D) (Note: This poll was sponsored by the New York Apartment Association.) | August 7–14, 2025 | 1,000 (LV) | ± 3.1% | 9% | 26% | 42% | 17% | 3% | 6% | | 16 |
| Tulchin Research (D) | August 7–14, 2025 | 1,000 (LV) | ± 3.1% | — | 52% | 41% | — | — | 7% | | 11 |
| Tulchin Research (D) | August 7–14, 2025 | 1,000 (LV) | ± 3.1% | 42% | — | 45% | — | — | 13% | | 3 |
| Gotham Polling & Analytics | August 11, 2025 | 1,376 (LV) | ± 3.2% | 9% | 23% | 42% | 17% | 1% | 0% (Note: "Another candidate" with 0%) | 8% | 19 |
| Gotham Polling & Analytics | August 11, 2025 | 1,376 (LV) | ± 3.2% | — | — | 44% | 21% | — | — | 35% | 9 |
| Gotham Polling & Analytics | August 11, 2025 | 1,376 (LV) | ± 3.2% | 20% | — | 44% | — | — | — | 36% | 18 |
| Gotham Polling & Analytics | August 11, 2025 | 1,376 (LV) | ± 3.2% | — | 31% | 42% | — | — | — | 27% | 11 |
| Siena University (Note: This poll was conducted among a sample of New York City voters as part of a larger poll of voters across New York State.) | August 4–7, 2025 | 317 (RV) | ± 6.7% | 7% | 25% | 44% | 12% | — | 2% (Note: "Someone else" with 2%) | 10% | 19 |
| Verasight/Public Progress Solutions (D)/ Zenith Research (D) | July 16–24, 2025 | 1,453 (RV) | ± 2.9% | 7% | 26% | 42% | 12% | 1% | 11% | | 16 |
| Verasight/Public Progress Solutions (D)/ Zenith Research (D) | July 16–24, 2025 | 1,453 (RV) | ± 2.9% | 16% | — | 48% | 15% | 4% | 17% | | 31 |
| Verasight/Public Progress Solutions (D)/ Zenith Research (D) | July 16–24, 2025 | 1,453 (RV) | ± 2.9% | — | 26% | 44% | 15% | 3% | 13% | | 18 |
| Verasight/Public Progress Solutions (D)/ Zenith Research (D) | July 16–24, 2025 | 1,453 (RV) | ± 2.9% | — | 43% | 46% | — | — | 11% | | 3 |
| Verasight/Public Progress Solutions (D)/ Zenith Research (D) | July 16–24, 2025 | 1,453 (RV) | ± 2.9% | 32% | — | 55% | — | — | 14% | | 23 |
| Verasight/Public Progress Solutions (D)/ Zenith Research (D) | July 16–24, 2025 | 1,021 (LV) | ± 3.9% | 7% | 22% | 50% | 13% | 1% | 6% | | 28 |
| Verasight/Public Progress Solutions (D)/ Zenith Research (D) | July 16–24, 2025 | 1,021 (LV) | ± 3.9% | 14% | — | 55% | 16% | 4% | 11% | | 39 |
| Verasight/Public Progress Solutions (D)/ Zenith Research (D) | July 16–24, 2025 | 1,021 (LV) | ± 3.9% | — | 25% | 51% | 15% | 2% | 6% | | 26 |
| Verasight/Public Progress Solutions (D)/ Zenith Research (D) | July 16–24, 2025 | 1,021 (LV) | ± 3.9% | — | 40% | 52% | — | — | 8% | | 12 |
| Verasight/Public Progress Solutions (D)/ Zenith Research (D) | July 16–24, 2025 | 1,021 (LV) | ± 3.9% | 32% | — | 59% | — | — | 9% | | 27 |
| Wick | July 18–20, 2025 | 500 (LV) | ± 4.4% | 9% | 21% | 39% | 18% | — | — | 13% | 18 |
| Wick | July 18–20, 2025 | 500 (LV) | ± 4.4% | — | 42% | 41% | — | — | — | 17% | 1 |
| Wick | July 18–20, 2025 | 500 (LV) | ± 4.4% | 37% | — | 47% | — | — | — | 16% | 10 |
| Wick | July 18–20, 2025 | 500 (LV) | ± 4.4% | — | — | 53% | 35% | — | — | 12% | 18 |
| HarrisX | July 7–8, 2025 | 585 (RV) | ± 4.1% | 13% | 23% | 26% | 22% | — | — | 15% | 3 |
| HarrisX | July 7–8, 2025 | 585 (RV) | ± 4.1% | — | 31% | 29% | 28% | — | — | 12% | 2 |
| HarrisX | July 7–8, 2025 | 585 (RV) | ± 4.1% | 19% | — | 35% | 25% | — | — | 21% | 10 |
| HarrisX | July 7–8, 2025 | 585 (RV) | ± 4.1% | 36% | — | 43% | — | — | — | 21% | 7 |
| HarrisX | July 7–8, 2025 | 585 (RV) | ± 4.1% | — | 50% | 35% | — | — | — | 15% | 15 |
| Slingshot Strategies (D) (Note: This poll does not include partisan affiliation for candidates.) | July 2–6, 2025 | 1,036 (RV) | ± 4.2% | 11% | 25% | 35% | 14% | 1% | 1% | 13% | 10 |
| Data for Progress (D) | July 1–6, 2025 | 756 (LV) | ± 4.0% | 15% | 24% | 40% | 14% | 1% | — | 5% | 16 |
| Gotham Polling & Analytics (Note: This poll was sponsored by Adams' campaign.) | June 30 – July 2, 2025 | 1,021 (LV) | ± 3.1% | 16% | 27% | 41% | 10% | 2% | — | 4% | 14 |
| Gotham Polling & Analytics | June 30 – July 2, 2025 | 1,021 (LV) | ± 3.1% | 28% | — | 47% | 12% | — | — | 13% | 19 |
| American Pulse Research & Polling | June 28 – July 1, 2025 | 568 (LV) | ± 4.0% | 14% | 29% | 35% | 16% | 1% | 1% | 3% | 6 |
| Honan Strategy Group (D) | June 25, 2025 | 817 (LV) | ± 3.4% | 13% | 39% | 39% | 7% | 0% | — | 2% | Tie |
| Honan Strategy Group (D) | June 25, 2025 | 817 (LV) | ± 3.4% | 31% | — | 46% | 11% | 2% | — | 10% | 15 |
| Honan Strategy Group (D) | June 25, 2025 | 817 (LV) | ± 3.4% | — | 44% | 40% | 11% | 1% | — | 5% | 4 |
| Manhattan Institute | June 10–16, 2025 | 1,000 (LV) | ± 3.1% | 10% | 39% | 25% | 12% | 3% | — | 11% | 14 |
| Manhattan Institute | June 10–16, 2025 | 1,000 (LV) | ± 3.1% | 19% | — | 33% | 16% | 5% | — | 28% | 5 |
| Emerson College | May 23–26, 2025 | 1,000 (RV) | ± 3.0% | 15% | — | 35% | 16% | 6% | — | 27% | 8 |

== Debates ==
During the general election campaign, two mayoral debates were organised by the New York City Campaign Finance Board and NYC Votes, working with local broadcasters WNBC and NY1. Mamdani, Sliwa and Cuomo all met the requirements for participation in the debates.

2025 New York City mayoral debates
| No. | Date | Host | Moderator | Link | Democratic | Republican | Independent |
| Key: P Participant A Absent N Not invited I Invited W Withdrawn | | | | | | | |
| Key: P Participant A Absent N Not invited I Invited W Withdrawn | | | | | Mamdani | Sliwa | Cuomo |
|---|---|---|---|---|---|---|---|
| 1 | October 16, 2025 | WNBC | Rosarina Bretón; Sally Goldenberg; Melissa Russo; David Ushery | | P | P | P |
| 2 | October 22, 2025 | NY1 | Katie Honan; Brian Lehrer; Errol Louis | | P | P | P |

== Results ==
Results map by precinct and borough using a continuous RGB color scheme

Results map by precinct and borough using a continuous CMYK color scheme

Unlike the primary elections, which used ranked-choice-voting, the general election used first-past-the-post voting. The Associated Press called the race for Mamdani at 9:34 p.m. EST.

Approximately two million votes were cast, including 735,317 early votes, marking the highest turnout since 1969. Mamdani received over a million votes, becoming the first candidate to do so since John Lindsay in 1969. Mamdani won Manhattan, Brooklyn, Queens, and the Bronx, while Staten Island, which voted for Curtis Sliwa in the 2021 mayoral election, flipped to Cuomo. Mamdani won 61% of mostly Black residents and 57% of mostly Hispanic residents, while Cuomo won 52% of mostly White residents. Compared to the 2024 election, Mamdani tended to do well in precincts won by Kamala Harris, while Cuomo did well in precincts won by Trump. Mamdani received the majority of votes from lower- and middle-income residents by 51%, respectively. Mamdani did better among voters with college degrees according to a CNN exit poll, winning 57% of voters with a college degree, compared to 42% of voters without a college degree.

Jewish voters preferred Cuomo by a nearly two-to-one margin: 63% voted for Cuomo, 33% for Mamdani, and 3% for Sliwa. Cuomo won nearly 80% of the vote in precincts with heavy Orthodox Jewish populations. According to The Wall Street Journal, Mamdani received 78% of voters aged 18–29, and 66% of voters aged 30–44, while Cuomo received 47% of voters aged 45–64 and 56% of voters aged 65+, including those that viewed themselves as moderates or conservatives. According to an NBC News poll, Mamdani won 81% of voters who had lived in New York City for less than 10 years, 55% of those who had lived there for over 10 years but were not born in the city, and 39% of voters born in the city. A CBS News poll also showed that Mamdani received 66% of first-time voters. According to CNN exit poll of more than 4,000 people, Mamdani had performed strongly among younger women, winning 84% of women aged 18–29 and 65% of women aged 30–45.

2025 New York City mayoral election
| Party | Candidate | Votes | % | ±% |
|---|---|---|---|---|
| Democratic | Zohran Mamdani | 944,950 | 43.07% | −22.12% |
| Working Families | Zohran Mamdani | 169,234 | 7.71% | N/A |
| Total | Zohran Mamdani | 1,114,184 | 50.78% | −16.21% |
| Fight and Deliver | Andrew Cuomo | 906,614 | 41.32% | N/A |
| Republican | Curtis Sliwa | 143,305 | 6.53% | −20.37% |
| Protect Animals | Curtis Sliwa | 10,444 | 0.48% | N/A |
| Total | Curtis Sliwa | 153,749 | 7.01% | −19.89% |
| Safe&Affordable/EndAntiSemitism | Eric Adams (incumbent) (withdrawn) | 6,897 | 0.31% | N/A |
| Conservative | Irene Estrada | 2,856 | 0.13% | −0.99% |
| Integrity | Jim Walden (withdrawn) | 2,319 | 0.11% | N/A |
| Quality of Life | Joseph Hernandez | 1,379 | 0.06% | N/A |
| Write-in | | 6,206 | 0.28% | −0.34% |
| Total votes | | 2,194,204 | 100% | |
| Democratic hold | | | | |

=== By borough ===
Results shown proportionally by borough

Mamdani won four boroughs out of five, securing Brooklyn, Queens, Manhattan, and the Bronx, while Cuomo carried Staten Island. This marked the first time a Republican did not prevail in the borough since 1985; however, it was still where Sliwa recorded his strongest performance, at 21.2% of the vote. The borough was also the only one where he came close to the second place, at 2,921 votes away from Mamdani. In contrast, Mamdani recorded his best result in Brooklyn, securing 57.1% of the vote. In comparison to the Democratic primary, Cuomo improved in Republican-heavy areas in Brooklyn, Queens, and Staten Island, while Mamdani gained ground in places with stronger Democratic support, including the Bronx, which he flipped away from Cuomo.

Both Mamdani and Cuomo earned a plurality of their votes in Brooklyn, at 36.3% and 28.9% of their total performance, respectively, reflecting the borough's status as the most populous one in the city. Conversely, Sliwa won a plurality of his votes in Queens, a repeat of his 2021 performance.

Candidate
| Candidate | Brooklyn | | Queens | | Manhattan | | Staten Island | | Bronx | |
| Candidate | Votes | % | Votes | % | Votes | % | Votes | % | Votes | % |
|---|---|---|---|---|---|---|---|---|---|---|
| Zohran Mamdani | 404,195 | 57.11% | 258,358 | 47.91% | 294,014 | 52.69% | 35,224 | 23.08% | 122,393 | 51.75% |
| Andrew Cuomo | 262,319 | 37.06% | 224,931 | 41.71% | 239,997 | 43.01% | 84,257 | 55.20% | 95,110 | 40.21% |
| Curtis Sliwa | 34,639 | 4.89% | 51,702 | 9.59% | 18,269 | 3.34% | 32,303 | 21.16% | 16,476 | 6.97% |
| Total counted votes | 707,767 | 100.00% | 539,211 | 100.00% | 558,058 | 100.00% | 152,645 | 100.00% | 236,523 | 100.00% |

=== By congressional district ===
Mamdani won nine congressional districts to Cuomo's four, securing an absolute majority in seven.

Results map by congressional district using a continuous RGB color scheme

| District | Mamdani | Cuomo | Sliwa | Representative |
|---|---|---|---|---|
| 3rd (part) | 30.6% | 53.6% | 15.2% | Tom Suozzi |
| 5th | 49.0% | 42.0% | 8.2% | Gregory Meeks |
| 6th | 39.0% | 49.8% | 10.6% | Grace Meng |
| 7th | 67.3% | 26.7% | 5.4% | Nydia Velázquez |
| 8th | 52.4% | 40.6% | 6.3% | Hakeem Jeffries |
| 9th | 52.6% | 43.8% | 2.9% | Yvette Clarke |
| 10th | 60.3% | 35.7% | 3.4% | Dan Goldman |
| 11th | 26.4% | 53.4% | 19.7% | Nicole Malliotakis |
| 12th | 45.6% | 50.6% | 3.4% | Jerry Nadler |
| 13th | 64.8% | 31.0% | 3.5% | Adriano Espaillat |
| 14th | 55.0% | 35.2% | 9.1% | Alexandria Ocasio-Cortez |
| 15th | 53.1% | 40.4% | 5.7% | Ritchie Torres |
| 16th (part) | 49.6% | 45.0% | 4.4% | George Latimer |

=== Voter demographics ===
2025 New York City mayoral election exit poll
| Demographic subgroup | Mamdani | Cuomo | Sliwa | % of total vote |
Total vote
| All voters | 51 | 41 | 7 | 100 |
Gender
| Men | 50 | 41 | 8 | 44 |
| Women | 50 | 43 | 6 | 55 |
Race
| White | 45 | 46 | 8 | 50 |
| Black | 57 | 38 | 3 | 17 |
| Latino | 52 | 39 | 8 | 17 |
| Asian | 62 | 32 | 6 | 10 |
| Other | 51 | 39 | 8 | 5 |
Gender by race
| White men | 42 | 49 | 9 | 23 |
| White women | 47 | 45 | 8 | 27 |
| Black men | 62 | 31 | 5 | 7 |
| Black women | 54 | 42 | 3 | 10 |
| Latino men | 55 | 33 | 11 | 7 |
| Latina women | 51 | 42 | 7 | 10 |
| All other voters | 60 | 32 | 7 | 16 |
Age
| 18–24 years old | 77 | 20 | 2 | 3 |
| 25–29 years old | 78 | 16 | 4 | 8 |
| 30–39 years old | 69 | 27 | 3 | 17 |
| 40–49 years old | 50 | 40 | 9 | 17 |
| 50–64 years old | 43 | 47 | 9 | 24 |
| 65 and older | 36 | 55 | 8 | 31 |
Education
| No high school degree | 40 | 48 | 11 | 3 |
| High school graduate | 40 | 46 | 13 | 17 |
| Some college | 41 | 47 | 10 | 13 |
| Associate's degree | 46 | 46 | 7 | 8 |
| Bachelor's degree | 57 | 38 | 5 | 31 |
| Advanced degree | 57 | 38 | 4 | 27 |
Party identification
| Democrats | 66 | 31 | 2 | 59 |
| Republicans | 4 | 73 | 23 | 15 |
| Independents | 43 | 46 | 9 | 26 |
Ideology
| Very liberal | 84 | 14 | 1 | 26 |
| Somewhat liberal | 69 | 29 | 1 | 23 |
| Moderate | 36 | 55 | 7 | 33 |
| Somewhat conservative | 10 | 71 | 18 | 12 |
| Very conservative | 8 | 61 | 30 | 6 |
Religion
| Protestants/Other Christians | 43 | 48 | 7 | 20 |
| Catholics | 33 | 52 | 15 | 27 |
| Jews | 32 | 64 | 3 | 16 |
| Other religious affiliation | 71 | 24 | 3 | 14 |
| No religious affiliation | 76 | 20 | 4 | 23 |
Income
| Less than $30,000 | 42 | 48 | 8 | 15 |
| $30,000–$49,999 | 53 | 40 | 5 | 14 |
| $50,000–$99,999 | 56 | 36 | 8 | 27 |
| $100,000–$199,999 | 55 | 37 | 7 | 26 |
| $200,000–$299,999 | 49 | 44 | 6 | 10 |
| $300,000 or more | 33 | 62 | 4 | 8 |
LGBT
| Yes | 81 | 15 | 2 | 14 |
| No | 46 | 45 | 8 | 86 |
Years living in NYC
| 10 years or less | 81 | 17 | 1 | 14 |
| 10 years or more | 55 | 40 | 4 | 37 |
| Born in NYC | 38 | 49 | 11 | 45 |
Home ownership
| Owners | 53 | 38 | 8 | 38 |
| Renters | 59 | 34 | 6 | 57 |
Most important issue
| Cost of living | 66 | 29 | 4 | 55 |
| Crime | 18 | 67 | 14 | 22 |
| Immigration | 27 | 58 | 14 | 9 |

== Aftermath ==
Cuomo conceded the election in a speech to his supporters, noting that he won a higher vote share on an independent line than his father Mario Cuomo did for the Liberal Party of New York in the 1977 New York City mayoral election. He called for unity with Mamdani supporters, saying "we will all help any way we can, because we need our New York City government to work." Cuomo did not call Mamdani to concede the election. Political commentators considered the election loss to be the end of Cuomo's political career. State senator Liz Krueger said Cuomo never "figured out why he was doing this and what mattered to him," and suggested that he was simply trying to poll better than his father in 1977.

Sliwa conceded defeat at 9:24 pm while addressing voters at an Italian restaurant on the Upper West Side. Declining to mention Mamdani by name in his concession speech, Sliwa warned the mayor-elect: "If you try to implement socialism, if you try to render our police weak and impotent, if you forsake the people's public safety, we're not only organizing, but we are mobilizing." Several minutes after conceding defeat, Sliwa called Mamdani to congratulate him on his victory.

Mamdani addressed his supporters around 11:30 pm. In a celebratory speech that opened with a quote by American socialist Eugene V. Debs, Mamdani repudiated the centrist politics of the Democratic establishment. He said of himself and of the Democratic Party:

I am young, despite my best efforts to grow older. I am Muslim. I am a democratic socialist. And most damning of all, I refuse to apologize for any of this. And yet, if tonight teaches us anything, it is that convention has held us back. We have bowed at the altar of caution, and we have paid a mighty price. Too many working people cannot recognize themselves in our party, and too many among us have turned to the right for answers to why they've been left behind. We will leave mediocrity in our past. No longer will we have to open a history book for proof that Democrats can dare to be great.

Mamdani also quoted Jawaharlal Nehru and invoked the legacy of Fiorello La Guardia. He said of Cuomo, "let tonight be the final time I utter his name". The Times called the speech "notably short on conciliatory language". Mamdani's speechwriter, Julian Gerson, told CNN the defiant tone of the speech was quite intentional, and that civility was not warranted when speaking to politicians such as Andrew Cuomo and Donald Trump by virtue of their uncivil treatment of the electorate. The day after the election, Mamdani said he considered the electorate to have handed him a mandate to implement his agenda, including taxing the rich.

Mamdani's victory reverberated nationally and internationally. London mayor Sadiq Khan assessed that "New Yorkers faced a clear choice—between hope and fear—and just like we've seen in London hope won". Leaders on the British left such as Zack Polanski and Jeremy Corbyn hoped that Mamdani's victory might augur a resurgence of democratic socialism in Britain ahead of their elections.

Many Democrats congratulated Mamdani for his win, with notable exceptions including the incumbent mayor Eric Adams. U.S. senator from New York and Senate Minority Leader Chuck Schumer, who had pointedly declined to endorse Mamdani's candidacy or say who he voted for, rebuffed the view that he was out of touch with the Democratic Party. Republicans viewed Mamdani's win alongside other losses in the 2025 United States elections as bad news for their own party, or as a harbinger of New York City's descent into communism.

On the morning of November 5, the local chapters of major Jewish organizations including UJA-Federation of New York, Jewish Community Relations Council of New York, the Anti-Defamation League of New York/New Jersey, American Jewish Committee (AJC) of New York, and New York Board of Rabbis issued a joint statement that they "cannot ignore that the mayor-elect holds core beliefs fundamentally at odds with our community's deepest convictions and most cherished values." AJC CEO Ted Deutch vowed to hold Mamdani to account. Rabbi Josh Joseph of the Orthodox Union, the largest umbrella organization for Orthodox Jews in America, called for Mamdani to "ensur[e] that safety, dignity, and respect are guaranteed to every New Yorker, including Jewish New Yorkers." The Nexus Project called the ADL "divisive, hyperbolic and aggressive" for planning to monitor Mamdani's administration for antisemitism. Many politicians in Israel condemned Mamdani's victory.

The CEO of JPMorgan Chase, Jamie Dimon, stated that he would help and work with Mamdani if asked; however, other CEOs had differing views. Mike Duggan, the outgoing mayor of Detroit, stated he saw many New Yorkers showing that they wanted change on election day, and saw Mamdani as a chance to deliver it. Governors and mayors in states like New Hampshire, Tennessee, or Florida have boosted the idea of businesses in New York City relocating to their states. President Trump told businesses in New York that Miami is a refuge if those businesses were considering to relocate. Conversely, Texas governor Greg Abbott said he would impose a 100% tariff on New Yorkers moving to Texas following the election, despite states not having the ability to issue tariffs, and despite tariffs being conceptually inapplicable to people. He later said he was joking.

== See also ==
- 2025 New York City ballot proposals
- 2025 New York City borough president elections
- 2025 New York City Comptroller election
- 2025 New York City Council election
- 2025 New York City Public Advocate election
- 2025 United States local elections
- Socialism in the United States
- List of mayors of New York City
- Politics of New York City
- Red-baiting

== Notes ==
Partisan clients
