= Hindus for Human Rights Action =

Progressive political advocacy group

Hindus for Human Rights Action is a progressive political advocacy group founded in 2025. The group has endorsed progressive candidates and positions in American elections, and also lobbies for civil rights in South Asia and North America.

== History ==
Hindus for Human Rights Action was founded by leaders at Hindus for Human Rights, a non-profit organization, in 2025. The group's goal is "unleashing the political voice of progressive Hindus." It is part of a "progressive Hindu bloc" in American politics that was visible during the election campaign of Zohran Mamdani.

== Campaigns ==
Hindus for Human Rights Actions supported Zohran Mamdani's campaign to became mayor of New York City in the 2025 New York City mayoral election, directly opposing Hindu nationalist-aligned groups such as HinduPACT and the Vishva Hindu Parishad America.

The group co-led a 2026 campaign in which over 100 politicians signed a pledge to reject donations from the Rashtriya Swayamsevak Sangh and affiliated Hindu nationalist groups.
