= Phil Wong =

American politician

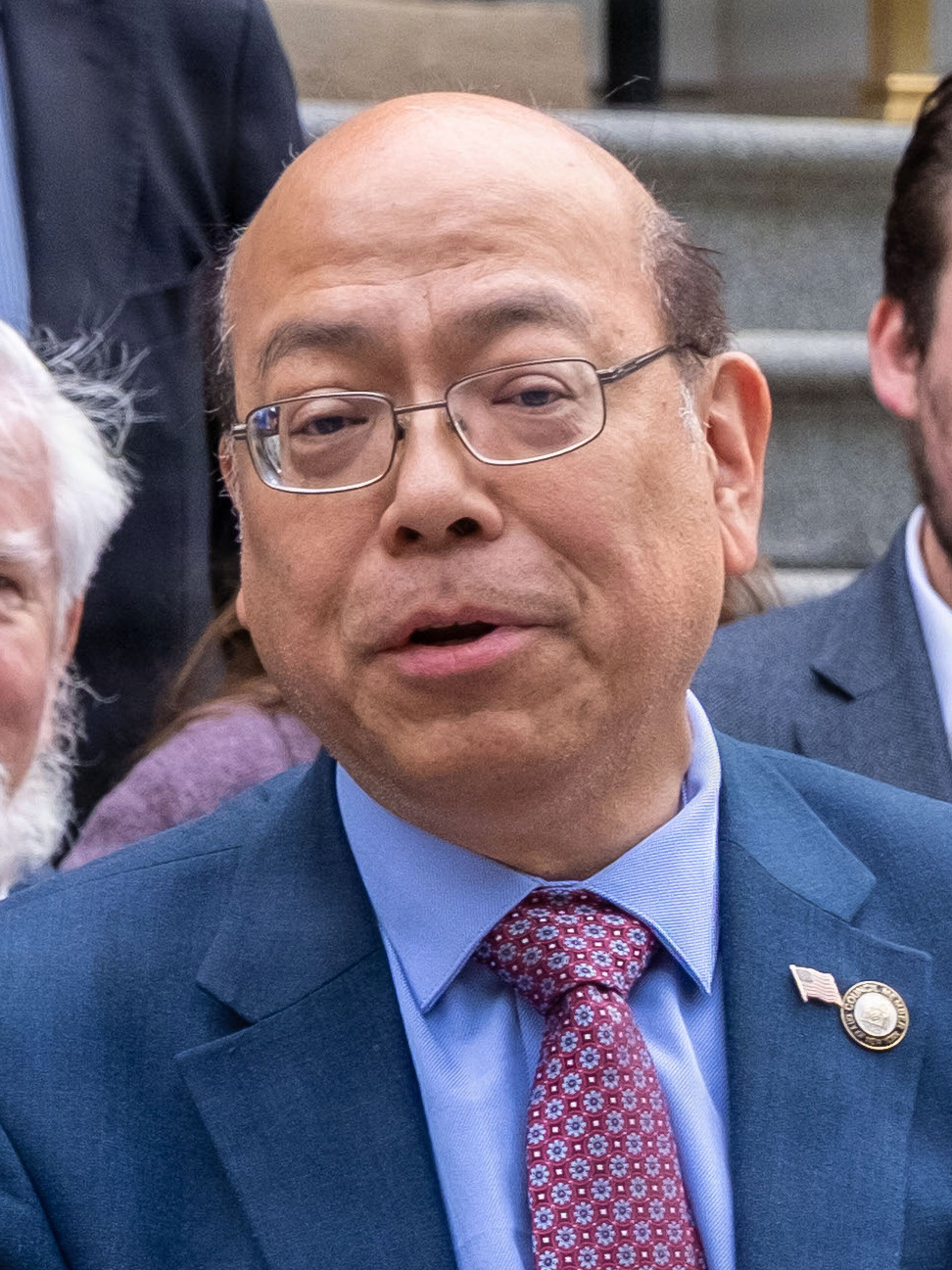
- Wong in 2026

Member of the New York City Council from the 30th district
- Incumbent
- Assumed office January 1, 2026
- Preceded by: Robert Holden

Personal details
- Born: British Hong Kong
- Party: Democratic
- Education: Cornell University (BA)

Phil Wong (Chinese: 黃友興) is an American activist and politician who is a member of the New York City Council from the 30th district, representing Elmhurst, Maspeth, Middle Village, Rego Park, and parts of Glendale and Ridgewood. A Democrat, he was elected in 2025. He previously served as the budget director for his predecessor, Robert Holden. Wong identifies as a conservative Democrat.

== Early life ==
Wong was born in British Hong Kong before immigrating to the United States with his family in 1974. He has lived in Elmhurst, Queens, since 1976. He graduated from Jamaica High School in Jamaica, Queens, attending Cornell University.

He has 3 daughters

== Career ==
Prior to entering politics, Wong worked as a patent translator. Wong's first political advocacy came in 2016 when he led protests aimed at shutting down a local homeless shelter. He went on to co-found the local civic group Elmhurst United, and was later elected president of the Community Education Council for District 24. He was later hired by then-incumbent councilmember Robert Holden, for whom Wong served as budget director and a constituent services liaison.

=== Elections ===
In 2025, Wong announced his campaign for the Democratic nomination for the New York City Council's 30th district. In the Democratic primary, teachers' union strategist Dermot Smyth was the heavy favorite, receiving the endorsement of the Queens Democratic Party; local civic leader Paul Pogozelski was also on the ballot. Wong ran on a conservative platform, criticizing Smyth's centrism and Pogozelski's progressivism. He received the endorsement of his boss, the outgoing councilman Holden; additionally, his campaign literature claimed endorsements from Curtis Sliwa, the Republican nominee for mayor, and Thomas Kenniff, the Republican nominee in the 2021 Manhattan District Attorney election. On election night, Wong led with 36% of the first-place vote; Pogozelski placed second, while Smyth surprised many with an unexpectedly poor third-place finish. Wong narrowly edged out Pogozelski in the ranked-choice runoff, ultimately winning by 316 votes.

In the general election, Wong faced off against fellow Holden staffer Alicia Vaichunas. The race attracted citywide attention because the two general election opponents simultaneously served as coworkers in the same councilman's office; Holden remained neutral, arguing both Wong and Vaichunas would faithfully honor his legacy. The race began cordially, with both candidates promising to hire the other in the event of their victory. However, Vaichunas later attacked Wong, alleging that Wong staffer Christina Wilkinson blocked her and her volunteers on Facebook. Wong eventually won with 54% of the vote. Wong would later hire Vaichunas to serve as his deputy chief of staff.

== Political views ==
Wong identifies as a conservative Democrat and has stated that "my policies are Republican policies."

=== Housing ===
Wong is a staunch critic of the City of Yes zoning overhaul proposed by former Mayor Eric Adams, arguing it would lead to overdevelopment and the erosion of neighborhood character. He was a plaintiff to a lawsuit arguing the proposal violated state law; however, Wong's claim was rejected by a Staten Island judge, who ruled that "it is not the place of the court to second-guess policy decisions." He has criticized Mayor Zohran Mamdani for his proposed rent freeze, arguing that rent control constitutes an unnecessary "handout."

In June 2026, Wong publicly denounced a Hunter College student report that proposed increasing density in his Council district, saying that he would "be reaching out to CUNY" due to his distress over what a group of students wrote for their assignment.

=== Immigration ===
Wong is an opponent of New York City's sanctuary city policy, arguing that current immigration policies are financially unsustainable.

=== Policing ===
Wong identifies as a strong supporter of the NYPD, criticizing the City Council for what he perceives as "anti-police legislation." Wong has called for an increase in funding for the NYPD to promote the hiring of new officers.

== Electoral history ==
=== 2025 ===
2025 New York City Council Democratic primary, District 30
Party	Candidate	Maximum round	Maximum votes	Share in maximum round	Maximum votes First round votes Transfer votes
Democratic	Phil Wong	3	5,549	51.5%	
Democratic	Paul Pogozelski	3	5,233	48.5%	
Democratic	Dermot P. Smyth	2	3,963	31.2%	
Write-In		1	168	1.3%	

2025 New York City Council election, District 30
Party	Candidate	Votes	%
Democratic	Phil Wong	20,501	54.2
Republican	Alicia B. Vaichunas	15,029	39.7
Conservative	Alicia B. Vaichunas	1,465	3.9
Total	Alicia B. Vaichunas	16,494	43.6
Write-in		842	2.2
Total votes		37,837	100.0
Democratic hold			

== See also ==
- Chinese Americans in New York City
