= Robert Holden (politician) =

American politician (born 1951)

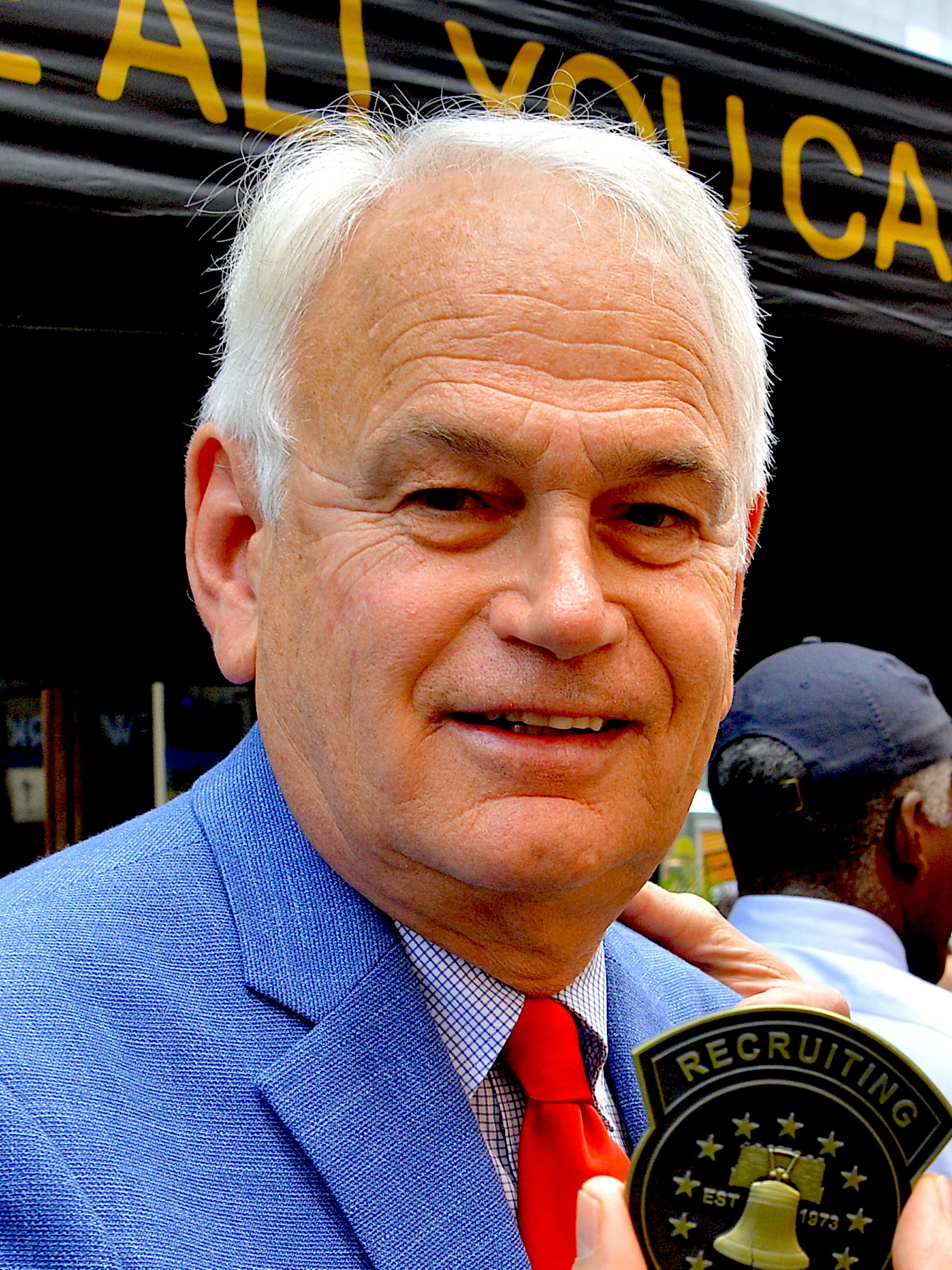
- Holden in 2024

Member of the New York City Council from the 30th district
- In office January 1, 2018 – December 31, 2025
- Preceded by: Elizabeth Crowley
- Succeeded by: Phil Wong

Personal details
- Born: October 12, 1951 (age 74) New York City, New York, U.S.
- Party: Democratic
- Spouse: Amy Holden
- Children: 3
- Education: New York City College of Technology (AAS); Queens College (BA); Hunter College (MFA)
- Website: Official website

Robert F. Holden (born October 12, 1951) is an American professor, graphic designer, and a former New York City Council member from the 30th district, representing the neighborhoods of Glendale, Maspeth, Middle Village, Ridgewood, and parts of Woodside and Woodhaven in the borough of Queens.

Holden came to elected office after some three decades in Queens civic affairs, most prominently as president of the Juniper Park Civic Association, in which capacity he led local opposition to a 2016 plan to convert a Maspeth hotel into a homeless shelter. He was elected to the council in 2017, defeating the incumbent Elizabeth Crowley in the general election after losing to her in the Democratic primary. One of the most conservative Democrats on the council, he chaired its Committee on Veterans and helped lead the Common Sense Caucus. He was barred by term limits from seeking a further term and left office at the end of 2025.

== Early life and education ==
Holden was raised in Maspeth, Queens. He earned an AAS from the New York City College of Technology, a BA from Queens College, and an MFA from Hunter College, all CUNY schools.

== Career ==
Holden is a professional graphic designer and a professor of the same at the New York City College of Technology.

Holden has also worked as an editor and art director for Juniper Berry magazine, and as a photojournalist published in newspapers and magazines in the United States and Europe. He has had his work exhibited at International Center of Photography, and other galleries.

== Civic activism ==
Holden has been a member of Queens Community Board 5 since 1988. He served as the board's first vice-chair and as chair of its public safety committee.

Holden became president of the Juniper Park Civic Association, a Maspeth-based community group, in 1990 and held the post for about 25 years. Juniper Berry is the association's magazine. In 2016 the association was among the organisations that led opposition to a plan by the administration of Mayor Bill de Blasio to convert a Holiday Inn Express in Maspeth into a homeless shelter. Holden was a prominent figure in the months of protests that followed, and criticised the administration for what he described as a lack of transparency and the local elected officials for not attending demonstrations. The city ultimately modified its plan for the site.

== New York City Council ==
=== 2017 election ===
Holden, a long-registered Democrat, ran in the 2017 Democratic primary for New York City Council against incumbent Democrat Elizabeth Crowley, but lost 63.6% to 36.1%. In the general election, Holden ran on the Republican, Conservative, Reform Party lines, as well as the independent "Dump de Blasio" line. Despite not being a registered member of the Republican party, he was able to receive the county's nomination by obtaining a Wilson Pakula authorization.

Holden won a tight race, garnering 10,653 votes to Crowley's 10,426.

=== Tenure ===
Holden won the Democratic primary in 2021 against Juan Ardila and was re-elected that November, again appearing on the Republican and Conservative lines as well as his own party's. He was re-elected to a further term in 2023, running on the Democratic, Republican, Conservative and several minor party lines.

In the council Holden chaired the Committee on Veterans and sat on committees including public safety, fire and emergency management, parks and recreation, technology, and environmental protection. He was among the founders of the Common Sense Caucus, a conservative-leaning bloc formed as a counterweight to the council's Progressive Caucus. Holden and Kalman Yeger were the only Democrats among its members, the remainder being Republicans. He was frequently described as the most conservative Democrat on the council.

Term limits barred Holden from seeking another term in 2025. Two members of his council staff, Phil Wong and Alicia Vaichunas, ran to succeed him. Holden endorsed Wong, who won the general election in November 2025 and took office the following January.

== Political views ==
=== Public safety ===
In April 2023 Holden was a witness at a field hearing of the House Judiciary Committee held in Manhattan on violent crime, at which the committee's Republican majority criticised the policies of Manhattan District Attorney Alvin Bragg. Holden, the only Democratic elected official to testify, said that serious offences were being charged as lesser ones. His participation drew criticism from other New York Democrats, which he publicly rejected.

=== Animal welfare ===
Holden opposes the operation of horse-drawn carriages in Central Park, which he describes as "torture". He has authored legislation to phase out the horse-drawn carriage industry and retrain drivers in other fields.

=== Polish heritage recognition ===
In 2018, Holden sponsored resolutions to recognize Polish Independence Day, Tadeusz Kosciuszko Day, and Casimir Pulaski Day in New York City. The Ridgewood neighborhood in Holden's district has a significant Polish American population.

=== Land use and zoning ===
In 2024, Holden fought to keep parking minimums in the New York City zoning code. During reform negotiations, there were proposals to reduce parking requirements for buildings near transit stations. Holden argued for parking mandates, saying, "It’s gotten so bad in parts of my district, including Maspeth, Middle Village and Ridgewood, that the firehouses are telling me when they go to a fire they can’t find the hydrant because it’s blocked by somebody parking."

Holden voted against a modified version of Mayor Eric Adams's zoning proposal called The City of Yes, which would allow the conversion and construction of 80,000 new and legal housing units across New York City. The plan was approved by the council in December 2024.

=== Transportation ===
Holden is a staunch critic of proposals to implement congestion pricing, calling it a "ridiculous tax that's going to kill New York City."

== Election history ==
=== 2017 ===
New York City Council, 30th District, Primary election
Party	Candidate	Votes	%
Democratic	Elizabeth Crowley (incumbent)	3,621	62.5
Democratic	Robert Holden	2,050	35.4
	Write-In	16	0.2
	Unattributable	107	1.8

New York City Council, 30th District, General election
Party	Candidate	Votes	%
Republican	Robert Holden	8,720	40.5
Conservative	Robert Holden	1,507	7.0
Reform	Robert Holden	189	0.9
Dump De Blasio	Robert Holden	147	0.7
Total	Robert Holden^{1}	10,563	49.0
Democratic	Elizabeth Crowley	9,351	43.4
Working Families	Elizabeth Crowley	911	4.2
Women's Equality	Elizabeth Crowley	164	0.7
Total	Elizabeth Crowley (incumbent)	10,426	48.4
	Write-in	11	0.2
	Unattributable	123	2.4

=== 2021 ===
New York City Council, 30th District, Primary election
Party	Candidate	Votes	%
Democratic	Robert Holden	5,250	54.6
Democratic	Juan Ardila	4,324	45.0
	Other	38	0.4

New York City Council, 30th District, General election
Party	Candidate	Votes	%
Republican	Robert Holden	10,555	52.4
Democratic	Robert Holden	7,991	39.6
Conservative	Robert Holden	1,167	5.8
Total	Robert Holden	19,713	97.8
Write-ins	Write-ins	440	2.2
Total votes		20,153	100.0

Holden is a registered Democrat but received the Republican party's nomination after losing the Democratic primary.

== Personal life ==
As of 2017, Holden had been married to his wife, Amy, for 44 years. They have three children and three grandchildren.
