= Gotham Polling & Analytics =

American polling and data analysis firm

- Type: LLC
- Industry: Political consulting, Opinion polling
- Founded: 2024
- Headquarters: New York City, New York, U.S.,
- Key people: Stephen Graves (president); David Schwartz (chairman); Denny Salas (executive vice president)
- Website: gothampolling.com

Gotham Polling & Analytics, also referred to simply as Gotham Polling, is an American polling and political analytics firm based in New York City. The firm focuses on state and local elections, public opinion research and voter behavior analysis, particularly in New York politics.

== History ==
Gotham Polling & Analytics was publicly launched in 2024 as an affiliate of Gotham Government Relations, a New York government relations firm. City & State wrote in 2025 that Gotham Government Relations had been founded in 2007 and had launched Gotham Polling as an affiliate the previous year.

== Polling and analysis work ==
=== 2024 elections ===
In October 2024, Gotham Polling conducted a survey of likely voters in New York's 4th congressional district ahead of the 2024 House elections. Coverage of the race in the New York Post and The Hill cited Gotham Polling's findings when describing the contest between Republican incumbent Anthony D'Esposito and Democrat Laura Gillen. In December 2024, Politico referenced Gotham Polling's statewide voter analysis in a newsletter item on age trends in New York politics.

=== 2025 New York City mayoral election ===
During the 2025 New York City mayoral election, Gotham Polling conducted multiple surveys of the race and partnered with AARP New York on voter research. A July 2025 New York Post article centered on a Gotham Polling survey commissioned by a pro-Eric Adams group, reporting that Adams trailed Andrew Cuomo by double digits and quoting Stephen Graves on the poll's findings. In August 2025, the Post reported on another Gotham survey that showed Zohran Mamdani leading the mayoral field.

AARP New York's polling with Gotham was covered by local television news and hosted by poll-tracking outlets. CBS News New York reported on an August 2025 Gotham–AARP poll that found Mamdani leading in multiple general-election scenarios. The New York Times included Gotham Polling in its interactive poll tracker for the 2025 mayoral race, and RealClearPolitics hosted the AARP New York–Gotham survey in PDF form.

== Related organization ==
Gotham Government Relations, with which Gotham Polling identifies itself as affiliated, has appeared in City & State rankings and profiles of New York lobbying and government relations firms. In its 2026 government relations list, City & State wrote that Schwartz's firm had a polling and analytics outfit, Gotham Polling & Analytics, and referenced the firm's New York City mayoral polling.
