= Hindus for Human Rights =

Hindu American pluralist advocacy organization

- Abbreviation: HfHR
- Formation: 2019; 7 years ago
- Founder: Sunita Viswanath, Raju Rajagopal, Deepak Gupta, Sapthagiri Iyengar, Sunil Sakhalkar, Punya Upadhyaya
- Tax ID no.: 36-4952444
- Legal status: 501(c)(3) non-profit
- Purpose: Pluralism, civil rights, and human rights in South Asia and North America
- Headquarters: Washington, D.C.
- Location: United States
- Region served: United States, United Kingdom, Australia
- Official language: English
- Website: www.hindusforhumanrights.org

Hindus for Human Rights (HfHR) is a U.S.-based nonprofit advocacy organization founded in 2019. The organization describes its work as rooted in Hindu commitments to pluralism, civil rights, and human rights. HfHR has been associated with opposition to Hindutva, advocacy for religious minorities in South Asia, anti-caste discrimination campaigns, and other progressive causes. The group has affiliates in the United Kingdom and Australia.

== History ==
The organization was founded in the summer of 2019 in the wake of Narendra Modi's re-election as Prime Minister of India. It was co-founded by Sunita Viswanath, Raju Rajagopal, Deepak Gupta, Sapthagiri Iyengar, Sunil Sakhalkar, and Punya Upadhyaya. Advisory board members of Hindus for Human Rights include Rajmohan Gandhi, T.M. Krishna, Martin Macwan, Faisal Khan, Linda Hess, Swara Bhaskar, and Khalid Anis Ansari.

In 2025, HfHR leaders created a separate political advocacy group, called Hindus for Human Rights Action.

== Advocacy ==
=== India ===
Hindus for Human Rights has protested against the Howdy Modi rally in 2019 and the Citizenship Amendment Act. HfHR has also organized press conferences and webinars in support of former and current activists and political prisoners in India including Sanjiv Bhatt, Umar Khalid, Anand Teltumbde, Sudha Bharadwaj, and the late Father Stan Swamy.

In April 2022, Hindus for Human Rights compiled a statement asking Hindus around the world to break the "collective silence and speak out" against Hindutva-fuelled hate and violence against Muslims in India.

=== United States ===
Hindus for Human Rights provides Know Your Rights information and resources for South Asian immigrants in the United States through in-person and virtual trainings at Hindu temples and Indian community centers.

Since 2023, Hindus for Human Rights has participated in debates over caste discrimination and civil-rights law in the United States. The organization supported Seattle's proposal to add caste to the city's anti-discrimination ordinance. Seattle later became the first U.S. city to prohibit caste discrimination. Hindus for Human Rights also supported California Senate Bill 403, which proposed adding caste as a protected category under California's anti-discrimination laws. Although the bill passed the state legislature, it was vetoed by Governor Gavin Newsom. In 2023, Hindus for Human Rights and the Indian American Muslim Council launched the Interfaith Harmony Student Fellowship to promote Hindu-Muslim engagement on university campuses.

In February 2026, Hindus for Human Rights joined a multifaith coalition to sue the Trump Administration for creating a Religious Liberty Commission that excluded non-Christian and non-Jewish participants. Additionally, the organization's New York City chapter supported proposed anti-caste legislation.

On July 27, 2026, US District Judge John Cronan dismissed the lawsuit challenging the creation of Religious Liberty Commission. In his dismissal, the judge wrote while the Federal Advisory Committee Act requires "fairly balanced in terms of the points of view represented," the law does not strictly define how that balance must be achieved. He also wrote the commission has to be "fairly balanced, not perfectly balanced" and a representative from every denomination does not have to be in it.

HfHR led protests against Rashtriya Swayamsevak Sangh (RSS) leader Mohan Bhagwat's visit to New York City in August 2026. Muslim and Christian leaders involved in Bhagwat's visit later apologized for their participation and said they had been misled. HfHR subsequently led a campaign for U.S. politicians to sign a pledge not to accept campaign donations from the RSS or affiliated Hindu nationalist groups.

=== International ===
Hindus for Human Rights has affiliate organizations in the UK and Australia.

In 2024, Hindus for Human Rights UK led campaigns against the organising of Hindu nationalist groups around the UK general election and against the fact that the "Mayor of London's annual Diwali" event was organised by the VHP (UK) and other groups that promote or support Hindutva. Hindus for Human Rights UK wrote an open letter to the Mayor of London that was signed by a number of prominent South Asian diasporic organisations, party political groups, and prominent individuals.

In the United Kingdom in 2026, HfHR UK criticized the inclusion of Vishwa Hindu Parishad UK in London's City Hall-backed Diwali celebrations.

== Opposition from Hindutva groups ==
HfHR's founders Sunita Viswanath and Raju Rajagopal were sued in 2021 by the Hindu American Foundation, a far-right Hindutva organization that is part of the Sangh Parivar. The lawsuit was opposed by more than 300 academics and public figures as a SLAPP lawsuit and was dismissed in 2022.
