= Women for Afghan Women =

Women for Afghan Women (WAW) is an Afghan women's rights organization founded in April 2001. WAW was co-founded by Sunita Viswanath, who was also chair of the board for some time.
