= Sunita Viswanath =

Indian-American activist

Sunita। Viswanath
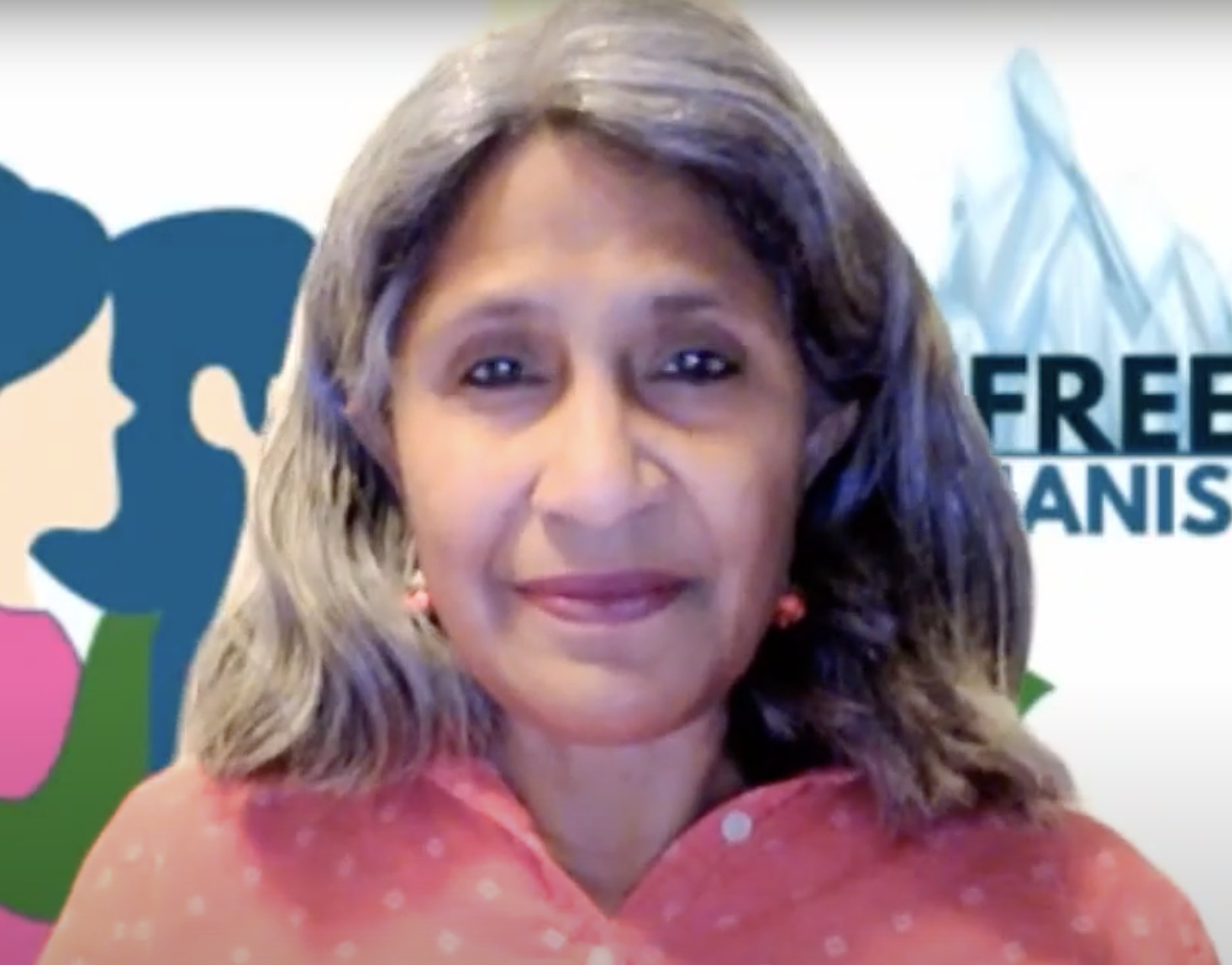
- Education: Rutgers University (BA); SNDT Women's University (MA)

Sunita Viswanath is an Indian-American activist who has worked in women's and human rights organizations. She co-founded the human rights organizations Women for Afghan Women, Sadhana: Coalition of Progressive Hindus, and Hindus for Human Rights.

== Early life and education ==
Viswanath was born in Chennai, India. She moved between London and Chennai during her early age, and later moved to the US when she was 19.

Viswanath received a BA in mathematics from Douglass College, Rutgers University and a MA in sociology from SNDT Women's University.

== Activism ==
=== Women for Afghan Women ===
In 2001, Viswanath co-founded the nonprofit humanitarian organization Women for Afghan Women (WAW). In 2002, Viswanath edited the volume of essays, Women for Afghan Women: Shattering Myths and Claiming the Future. Initially founded to support the Afghan community in Queens, WAW expanded in 2005 to support the rights and needs of women in Afghanistan.

In 2011, Viswanath was awarded the Feminist Majority Foundation's Global Women's Rights Award for her work with WAW.

Viswanath is no longer affiliated with WAW.

=== Sadhana ===
In 2011, Viswanath co-founded Sadhana: Coalition of Progressive Hindus to be a progressive Hindu movement aligned with social justice commitments to anti-casteism and anti-racism. One of Sadhana's projects, Project Prithvi, aims to protect the environment by cleaning up a beach in Jamaica Bay, Queens. In 2015, she was honored as a White House "Champion of Change" for her work with Sadhana.

=== Hindus for Human Rights ===
In 2019, Viswanath co-founded Hindus for Human Rights (HfHR), a US-based advocacy organization that aims to promote religious pluralism in North America and South Asia. In 2021, Viswanath wrote a piece with Raju Rajagopal in favor of the Dismantling Global Hindutva conference in the face of criticism. In May 2021, Viswanath was a named defendant in a defamation case filed by the Hindu American Foundation, which was dismissed in 2022.

=== Columbia University ===
In 2020, Viswanath was named a Religious Life Adviser at Columbia University. Despite a petition claiming she was "anti-Hindu" and asking her to be removed, the university continued to support Viswanath in her role.

=== Other work ===
Viswanath at a Jewish Voice for Peace-led sit-in in Manhattan on September 24, 2026.

In 2020, Viswanath was appointed by New York City Mayor Bill de Blasio to serve on the Faith-Based Sector Advisory Council to advise on the city's COVID-19 response, and in 2021 she was part of Mayor-elect Eric Adams' transition committee.

In 2021, Viswanath was named by the Center for American Progress as one of 21 faith leaders to watch.

Viswanath serves on the advisory boards of UnFreeze Afghanistan and Population Media Center. In March 2022, Viswanath traveled to Afghanistan as part of a Women's Delegation for Peace and Education, which included Ruth Messinger, Medea Benjamin, Rev. Chloe Breyer, Daisy Khan and Masuda Sultan, to advocate for women's rights and to deliver humanitarian aid.

In August 2022, Viswanath and Masuda Sultan co-founded Abaad: Afghan Women Forward, an NGO which works to provide humanitarian assistance and fund economic programs for women. Its first clients included those formerly served by WAW.

== Personal life ==
Viswanath's first marriage was to writer Suketu Mehta. Her second marriage was to Stephan Shaw, who is an active member of Jewish Voice for Peace. She has three sons, Gautama, Akash, and Satya.
