= City of Yes =

City-wide rezoning of New York City

City of Yes, formally City of Yes for Housing Opportunity, is a city-wide rezoning of New York City passed in 2024. It was the most extensive set of zoning changes since 1961. It is expected to add 82,000 new housing units over 15 years. Per the New York City Department of City Planning, it would create more homes accessible to those at lower incomes over the 15 years than all of New York's inclusionary housing programs since the 1980s.

== Provisions ==
Rezoning provisions included:

- Implementation of a Universal Affordability Preference policy, allowing buildings in medium and high density districts to add 20% more housing, provided the marginal homes are income-restricted and affordable to residents making 60% of the area median income
- Legalization of accessory dwelling units in single family homes and duplexes in low-density districts.
- Expansion of conversions of offices to residential spaces
- Legalization of 2-4 stories of housing above commercial ground floors in low-density areas
- Legalization of modestly sized apartment buildings by transit corridors in low-density residential areas to achieve transit-oriented development
- End of parking mandates in Manhattan, Long Island City, and neighborhoods in Brooklyn and Queens adjoining the East River in the designated "Inner Transit Zone", including Sunset Park, Windsor Terrace, Gowanus, Boerum Hill, Downtown Brooklyn, Prospect Heights, Crown Heights, Bed-Stuy, Clinton Hill, Williamsburg, Greenpoint, Sunnyside, Woodside, Jackson Heights, and Astoria.
- Modification of zoning rules to allow more small & shared housing, including apartments with shared kitchens.

== Legislative history ==
The rezoning was passed in the New York City Council with a vote of 31 for, 20 against. It modified on the plan, originally proposed by the office of the mayor, Eric Adams, adding incentives to provide more affordable units in exchange for more opportunities to build, while restricting where accessory dwelling units could be built, reducing the radius around train stations in which 3-5 story apartment buildings would be legalized in low-density areas, and maintaining parking mandates in parts of the outer boroughs.

Community boards were more skeptical of the proposal, while borough presidents for every borough except Staten Island endorsed the plan.
