= Whitney Seymour =

Whitney Seymour may refer to:

- Whitney North Seymour (1901–1983), American attorney, solicitor general under President Herbert Hoover
- Whitney North Seymour Jr. (1923–2019), American attorney and New York State Senator
