= Senator DiCarlo =

Senator DiCarlo may refer to:

- Joseph DiCarlo (1936–2020), Massachusetts State Senate
- Robert DiCarlo (born 1957), New York State Senate
