= Learn to Draw =

1950s television series by Jon Gnagy

Learn to Draw is a syndicated series of 15 minute drawing lessons from Jon Gnagy. It was shown from 1950 to 1955 and Gnagy "never earned a cent directly from the show".

It was considered a "children's show" at the time, according to Children and Television: Fifty Years of Research. The book Learn to Draw was first issued in 1950, and is still in print. The art kit created for the program is still available, and contains the book, "sketching paper, three drawing pencils, one carbon pencil, three sketching chalks, one kneaded eraser, one shading stump, one sandpaper sharpener, and one laptop drawing surface"

Comic book artist, former editor-in-chief for Marvel Comics, and now Marvel Comics' Chief Creative Officer, Joe Quesada specifically credits the program with his interest in art, " I was deeply influenced by television, especially when it came to art and drawing. And the very first guy who drew for a living on TV was Jon Gnagy. Mr. Gnagy was the host of a show called "Learn to Draw" where he'd show you how to illustrate things like a mountain lake or an ocean liner or a gristmill. Seriously, a gristmill! I'd follow along at home and do everything just as he did it. Watching Jon Gnagy draw was like watching a magician do the world's greatest magic trick. Imagine how thrilled I was when one day my dad surprised me with an official Jon Gnagy art kit."

Ron Husband of Walt Disney Feature Animation wrote that his earliest recollections of drawing involved the Learn to Draw television show.

Andy Warhol stated that he learned to draw from the program. Warhol also said "I watched his show every week and I bought all his books."

David Wiesner, multiple Caldecott Medal winning illustrator, recalled watching Jon Gnagy every Saturday morning, and says "this guy was an artist." Richard Egielski, also a Caldecott Medal winner said "I loved the Jon Gnagy show."

Many videos of the program are available on YouTube uploaded by Jon Gnagy's son-in-law, Thaddeus Seymour, the president of Rollins College from 1978-90.

Michael Sporn, noted animator, wrote on his company's website:

When I was young, Jon Gnagy was the on-air art instructor. His paintings might have been a little better than Bob Ross, or maybe it's my memory that makes them better.

== Current uses unrelated to Jon Gnagy ==
Unrelated to Jon Gnagy, EarthTree Media is using the name Learn to Draw for a series of videos by Øistein Kristiansen aimed at teaching art to children.

Learn to Draw.org is a commercial website teaching the art of caricature.
