= Whitney North Seymour Jr. =

American politician and lawyer (1923–2019)

Mike Seymour
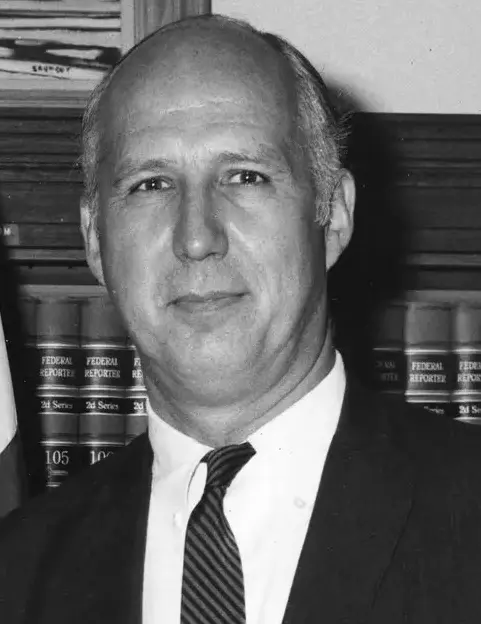
- Seymour in 1970

United States Attorney for the Southern District of New York
- In office January 16, 1970 – June 4, 1973
- President: Richard Nixon
- Preceded by: Robert Morgenthau
- Succeeded by: Paul J. Curran

Member of the New York State Senate
- In office 1966–1968
- Preceded by: Abraham Bernstein (28th); John J. Marchi (26th)
- Succeeded by: Joseph Zaretzki (28th); Roy M. Goodman (26th)
- Constituency: 28th district (1966); 26th district (1967–1968)

Personal details
- Born: Whitney North Seymour Jr. July 7, 1923 Huntington, West Virginia, U.S.
- Died: June 29, 2019 (aged 95) Torrington, Connecticut, U.S.
- Party: Republican
- Spouse: Catryna Ten Eyck (m. 1951; died 2017)
- Children: 2
- Relatives: Whitney North Seymour (father); Thaddeus Seymour (brother)
- Education: Princeton University (AB); Yale University (LLB)

Military service
- Branch/service: United States Army
- Years of service: 1943–1945
- Rank: Captain
- Battles/wars: World War II

Whitney North Seymour Jr. (July 7, 1923 – June 29, 2019), known to friends as Mike Seymour, was an American politician and attorney from New York City. Born to a prominent family, Seymour graduated from Princeton University and Yale Law School and served in the United States Army during World War II. He served in the New York State Senate from 1966 to 1968 and as U.S. Attorney for the Southern District of New York from 1970 to 1973.

As U.S. Attorney, Seymour prosecuted a number of high-profile organized crime and corruption cases. A moderate Republican, Seymour unsuccessfully sought a seat in the U.S. House of Representatives in 1968, and unsuccessfully sought the Republican nomination for U.S. Senate in 1982. Seymour was an attorney for many years with the law firm of Simpson Thacher & Bartlett, but left in the early 1980s to form a smaller law firm. In 1986, he was appointed as independent counsel to investigate former Reagan White House official Michael Deaver, and successfully secured a perjury conviction the next year.

Seymour co-founded the Natural Resources Defense Council, an environmentalist group, in 1970. As a civic leader in New York, he served on a number of boards, and played an important role in the Municipal Art Society's push for passage of the city's 1965 Landmarks Law. Seymour wrote three books and, in later life, co-wrote a one-act play that was performed off-Broadway. He died in 2019 at age 95.

== Early life and military service ==
Seymour was born in Huntington, West Virginia, on July 7, 1923, the son of Whitney North Seymour (1901–1983) and Lola Vickers Seymour (d. 1975). He grew up in the Manhattan borough of New York City, in a rowhouse in the Greenwich Village. Seymour's father was a prominent attorney who served as assistant solicitor general during the Herbert Hoover administration. Seymour's brother was academician Thaddeus Seymour.

Seymour graduated from the Kent School in Connecticut in 1941. He joined the U.S. Army in 1943, serving as an artillery officer in the Pacific theater during World War II, and resigning in 1945 with the rank of captain.

After the war, Seymour attended college at Princeton University, graduating magna cum laude with a AB in 1947. He then attended Yale Law School, earning a LLB degree in 1950.

== Career ==
=== Early career in law and politics ===
Seymour joined the law firm of Simpson Thacher & Bartlett in 1950; his father had been a longtime partner at the firm. He was an assistant U.S. attorney in Manhattan from 1953 to 1956. Seymour then returned to private practice before being appointed, three years later, as counsel to the State Commission on New York City Governmental Operations. His first political position was as a Republican precinct captain in the 1950s.

Seymour ran unsuccessfully for the New York State Assembly in 1958, challenging William F. Passannante. During his campaign, he called for the preservation of the Jefferson Market Courthouse. After losing the race, he was appointed counsel to the New York State Temporary Committee On the Governmental Operations of the City of New York (nicknamed the "Little Hoover Commission") and became active in the Greenwich Village Association. He later became active in the Park Association of New York City, serving as its president (the association later merged into The Parks Council). In this role, he criticized Robert Moses's projects and campaigned against proposals to put an underground parking garage below Madison Square Park.

He was a member of the New York State Senate from 1966 to 1968, sitting in the 176th and 177th New York State Legislatures. While in the Senate, he sponsored the legislation to create the South Street Seaport Museum, persuading Governor Nelson Rockefeller to sign it despite the objections of his brother David Rockefeller.

He was the Republican nominee for the United States House of Representatives in the New York's 17th congressional district in November 1968, running against Democrat Ed Koch in the "silk stocking" district. In the Republican primary election, Seymour eked out a win against S. William Green, receiving 12,291 votes to Green's 10,851. To maintain his nearly perfect record of attendance in the state Senate, Seymour also missed many opportunities to make campaign appearances during the primary campaign. In the general election, Koch and Seymour differed more on matters of style than on issues of policy; Koch was an adept and indefatigable campaigner with a constant public presence, while the patrician Seymour disliked street politics. Koch spoke about his record of engaging in protests and pickets (on causes such as support for the Delano grape strike and opposition to the Vietnam War) while Seymour that he had "never joined any kind of protest march or demonstration" except for a march to ban automobiles from Central Park. Although he received the endorsement of Mayor John V. Lindsay, Seymour lost the race; Koch won with 48% of the vote (on both the Democratic and Liberal Party ballot lines), while Seymour received 45% of the vote and Conservative Party candidate Richard J. Callahan received 5.8% of the vote. Seymour thus became the first Republican in three decades to lose the congressional election in the "silk stocking" district.

=== Involvement in founding of the NRDC ===
In 1970, Seymour was among the group that co-founded the Natural Resources Defense Council (NRDC), and served on its board. The NRDC's establishment was partially an outgrowth of the Scenic Hudson Preservation Conference v. Federal Power Commission, the Storm King case, in which Seymour was involved. The case centered on Con Ed's plan to build the world's largest hydroelectric facility at Storm King Mountain. The proposed facility would pump vast amounts of water from the Hudson River to a reservoir, and release it through turbines to generate electricity at peak demand. A dozen concerned citizens organized the Scenic Hudson Preservation Conference in opposition to the project, citing its environmental impact, and the group, represented by Seymour, his law partner Stephen Duggan, and David Sive, sued the Federal Power Commission, and successfully achieved a ruling that groups such as Scenic Hudson and other environmentalist groups had standing to challenge the FPC's administrative rulings. Realizing that continued environmental litigation would require a nationally organized, professionalized group of lawyers and scientists, Duggan, Seymour, and Sive obtained funding from the Ford Foundation and joined forces with Gus Speth and other recent Yale Law School graduates of the class of 1969 to form the NRDC, with John H. Adams as the group's first staff member, Duggan as its first chairman, and Seymour, Laurance Rockefeller, and others as board members.

=== U.S. Attorney for the Southern District of New York ===
He was U.S. Attorney for the Southern District of New York from 1970 to 1973, replacing Robert Morgenthau. As U.S. Attorney, Seymour and his criminal division chief, Harold Baer Jr., took action to reduce a large backlog of criminal cases in the Southern District. (Note: Seymour became a lifelong friend and mentor to Baer, who later served on the U.S. District Court for the Southern District of New York.) As U.S. Attorney, Seymour also prosecuted New York City Police Department corruption and misconduct cases brought by the Knapp Commission. Under Seymour, former Richard Nixon Cabinet members John N. Mitchell and Maurice H. Stans were indicted on charges of accepting illegal campaign contributions from fugitive Robert Vesco, but both were acquitted. He also oversaw the prosecutions of a number of organized crime figures, including Frank Costello, and corrupt public officials, including former State Senator Seymour R. Thaler. Seymour was, however, initially skeptical about the practical use of the then-new Racketeer Influenced and Corrupt Organizations (RICO) Act; in a meeting with G. Robert Blakey, the law professor who pioneered the act, Seymour dismissed RICO as a waste of time. Later, after RICO's value in fighting organized crime was demonstrated, Seymour acknowledged that "in hindsight we were one hundred percent wrong."

As U.S. Attorney, Seymour represented the United States government in seeking an injunction to stop The New York Times from publishing the Pentagon Papers; the United States Supreme Court ultimately ruled in favor of the Times in the case New York Times Co. v. United States. Seymour's longtime friend Powell Pierpoint said that Seymour "represented the government like a good soldier, though I don't think he personally believed in the case. ... He made a damn good argument out of a poor case. He presented the argument himself. That's the kind of fellow Mike is." Later, however, Seymour was critical of the Times's handling of the case; in a 1994 article in the New York State Bar Journal, he wrote that he remained "appalled at the arrogance and irresponsibility displayed by the news media in setting up a totally unnecessary confrontation over publication of stolen classified documents relating to U.S. policies in Vietnam." In Seymour's view, from a practical perspective, the government had "lost the battle but won the war" in the Pentagon Papers cases, since the Times and Washington Post, following the Supreme Court's decision, did not publish material whose release could damage national security, such as the "secret Defense Department study directly affecting military and intelligence operations and secret diplomatic efforts to achieve peace."

=== Return to private practice and 1982 Senate election ===
After stepping down in the U.S. Attorney post in 1973, Seymour returned to private practice at Simpson Thacher & Bartlett.

Seymour unsuccessfully sought the Republican nomination for U.S. Senator from New York in the 1982 election. He ran as a self-described moderate Republican, in the mold of Dwight Eisenhower or Jacob Javits. Seymour was backed by many former aides to Mayor Lindsay, and had the most establishment support. He won the support of the Republican Party's New York State Committee, but former State Banking Superintendent Muriel Siebert and State Assemblywoman Florence M. Sullivan garnered enough support to make it onto the primary ballot. Sullivan, the most conservative of the primary candidates, won the primary with a comfortable lead. Seymour came in last place, and later said that he had taken "a foolish stab" at the nomination.

In 1982, Seymour departed from Simpson Thacher & Bartlett after more than three decades of affiliation with the firm, believing that large law firms were becoming too bureaucratic. He joined with another lawyer, Peter Megargee Brown (formerly of Cadwalader, Wickersham & Taft), to form a small two-person firm.

=== Independent counsel in Deaver case ===
In May 1986, a panel of three federal judges appointed Seymour as independent counsel to investigate Michael Deaver, a senior aide to President Ronald Reagan. Deaver was the deputy chief of staff in the Reagan White House before leaving in May 1985 and becoming a lobbyist for the Canadian government. Deaver was indicted on five counts of perjury on charges that he had given false testimony to a grand jury that he did not remember a January 1985 meeting with Canadian ambassador Allan Gotlieb and his wife Sondra. Deaver challenged the constitutionality of the independent counsel provisions of the Ethics in Government Act, but the D.C. Circuit rejected his claim in 1987. (Note: The Supreme Court ultimately upheld the constitutionality of the independent counsel provision in Morrison v. Olson, 487 U.S. 654 (1988), a case involving different parties. Seymour submitted an amicus brief to the Supreme Court in the Morrison case.)

During the investigation, Seymour stirred controversy by issuing a subpoena to the Gotliebs, seeking their testimony. The Canadian government lodged a formal protest with the U.S. government, arguing that an attempt to serve the subpoena was a violation of diplomatic immunity, and the U.S. Department of State urged Seymour to drop the subpoena. The U.S. district court quashed the subpoena on grounds of diplomatic immunity and ruled Allan Gotlieb had not waived his immunity by agreeing to respond to written questions from the independent counsel. Gotlieb ultimately did not testify at Deaver's 1987 trial, although former national security adviser Robert C. McFarlane and former U.S. ambassador to Canada Paul H. Robinson Jr. did both testify as witnesses for the prosecution. Deaver was convicted of perjury.

=== Later life and death ===
Seymour eschewed conventional notions of retirement, and remained active as a New York lawyer into his 90s. In 2000 and 2001, he represented cartoonist Dan DeCarlo in his unsuccessful litigation against Archie Comics over ownership of Josie and the Pussycats.

Seymour died at Charlotte Hungerford Hospital in Torrington, Connecticut, on June 29, 2019, at age 95.

== Civic leadership ==
Seymour served at various points as president of the New York State Bar Association, trustee of the New York Public Library, and director of the Municipal Art Society of New York. In August 1964, the Municipal Art Society designated Seymour as the leader of its efforts to permanently establish the New York City Landmarks Preservation Commission. As a prominent civic leader, Seymour's efforts were instrumental in the passage of the Landmarks Law in 1965.

In 1976, Seymour organized the National Citizens Emergency Committee to Save Our Public Libraries, which advocated for public libraries and opposed budget cuts. Seymour was a staunch opponent of political action committees, believing them to have a malign effect on Congress, and was a founder of Citizens Against PACs.

== Writings ==
Seymour authored three books:

- In Why Justice Fails (Morrow, 1973), Seymour addressed a variety of issues, including overburdened courts and flaws in the prison system, and recommended various reforms.
- In United States Attorney: An Inside View of 'Justice' in America Under the Nixon Administration (Morrow, 1975), Seymour reviewed the history of federal law enforcement, criticized bureaucracy in the U.S. Department of Justice, called for more vigorous investigation and prosecution of white-collar crimes, and criticized the "arrogance and political expediency in the Nixon Justice Department." Seymour proposed a reform in which the Federal Bureau of Investigation would be separated from the Justice Department, and a new non-political post of chief prosecutor would be created. In a review of the book in ABA Journal, reviewer Richard J. Hoskins noted that the book was "not tightly organized" and wrote "Seymour is not a lively writer. He speaks with the force of straightforward conviction, but seldom with style." Hoskins nevertheless called the book a worthwhile read in the aftermath of the Watergate scandal.
- In Making a Difference (Morrow, 1984), Seymour profiled various individuals—ranging from Prudence Crandall to Muhammad Ali to Alexander Woollcott—to show various character attributes linked to public service. A Kirkus review described the work as a "well-meaning sermon/book" and criticized the "relentlessly banal, uplift prose" as "bland and superficial."

In later life Seymour, his wife Catryna, and their daughters Tryntje and Gabriel, co-wrote and produced Stars in the Dark, a one-act play about Hans and Sophie Scholl and their role in the White Rose resistance group in Nazi Germany in the 1940s. The play, which took around five years to write, was released in 2008 (when Seymour was 85) and had five performances off-Broadway.

== Personal life ==
In 1951, Seymour married Catryna Ten Eyck, who died in 2017. He had two daughters. Seymour was a "rather formal man"; his tendency to "come across as a stiff, even dour, candidate" may have inhibited his political aspirations.

Seymour maintained homes in Greenwich Village, Manhattan, and Salisbury, Connecticut. He was an avid watercolorist and oil painter.

Seymour was an Episcopalian. He was a member of The Players.

== Notes ==
New York State Senate
Preceded by Abraham Bernstein	Member of the New York State Senate from the 28th district 1966	Succeeded by Joseph Zaretzki
Preceded by John J. Marchi	Member of the New York State Senate from the 26th district 1967–1968	Succeeded by Roy M. Goodman
Legal offices
Preceded by Robert Morgenthau	United States Attorney for the Southern District of New York; 1970–1973	Succeeded by Paul J. Curran
