= 1982 United States Senate election in New York =

- November 2, 1982
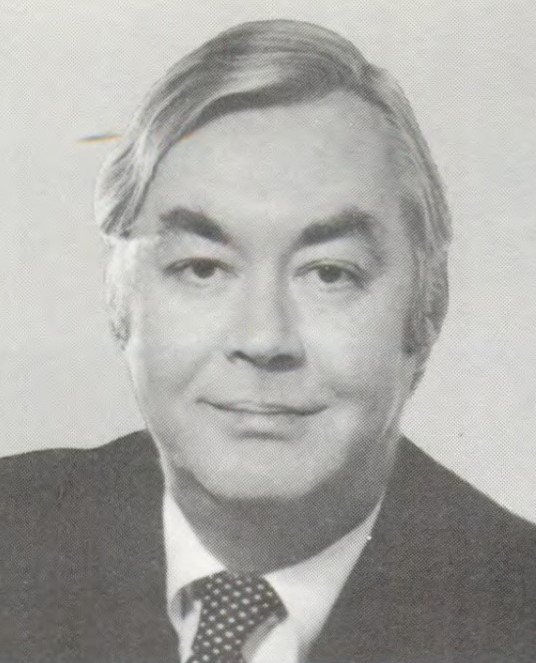

Nominee	Pat Moynihan	Florence Sullivan
Party	Democratic	Republican
Alliance	Liberal	Parties: Conservative; Right to Life
Popular vote	3,232,146	1,696,766
Percentage	65.07%	34.16%
- County results Moynihan: 40–50% 50–60% 60–70% 70–80% 80–90% Sullivan: 40–50% 50–60%
U.S. senator before election
Pat Moynihan
Democratic
Elected U.S. Senator
Pat Moynihan
Democratic

The 1982 United States Senate election in New York was held on November 2, 1982. Incumbent Democratic U.S. Senator Daniel Patrick Moynihan won re-election to a second term.

Moynihan's victory made him the first Senator holding this seat to win a second term since Irving M. Ives won his second and final term in 1952.

== Democratic primary ==
=== Candidates ===
- Melvin Klenetsky, LaRouchite activist
- Daniel Patrick Moynihan, incumbent U.S. Senator since 1977

=== Results ===
1982 Democratic U.S. Senate primary
Party	Candidate	Votes	%
Democratic	Daniel Patrick Moynihan (incumbent)	922,059	85.13%
Democratic	Melvin Klenetsky	161,012	14.87%
Total votes		1,083,071	100.00%

== Republican primary ==
=== Candidates ===
- Whitney North Seymour Jr., former United States Attorney for the Southern District of New York and state senator from Manhattan
- Muriel Siebert, stockbroker
- Florence M. Sullivan, assemblywoman from Bay Ridge, Brooklyn

==== Withdrew ====
- Bruce F. Caputo, former U.S. representative from Yonkers and candidate for U.S. Senate in 1980 (withdrew March 8)

=== Results ===
1982 Republican U.S. Senate primary
Party	Candidate	Votes	%
Republican	Florence M. Sullivan	216,486	42.37%
Republican	Muriel Siebert	157,446	30.82%
Republican	Whitney North Seymour Jr.	136,974	26.81%
Total votes		510,906	100.00%

== Results ==
General election results
Party	Candidate	Votes	%
Democratic	Daniel Patrick Moynihan (incumbent)	3,089,871	62.20%
Liberal	Daniel Patrick Moynihan (incumbent)	142,275	2.86%
Total	Daniel Patrick Moynihan (incumbent)	3,232,146	65.07%
Republican	Florence M. Sullivan	1,415,749	28.50%
Conservative	Florence M. Sullivan	175,650	3.54%
Right to Life	Florence M. Sullivan	105,367	2.12%
Total	Florence M. Sullivan	1,696,766	34.16%
Libertarian	James J. McKeown	23,379	0.47%
Socialist Workers	Steven Wattenmaker	15,206	0.31%
Total votes		4,967,497	100.00%
Democratic hold			

== See also ==
- 1982 United States Senate elections
