= Risk and reward =

Risk and reward may refer to:

- Risk and reward (gaming), a mechanic in gaming
- "Risk and Reward", an episode of The Good Doctor
- Risk/Reward a 2003 film
- Risk–return ratio of investments
- Risk–return spectrum in finance
