= F. W. Weber =

American chemist, artist, and businessman

Frederick William Weber
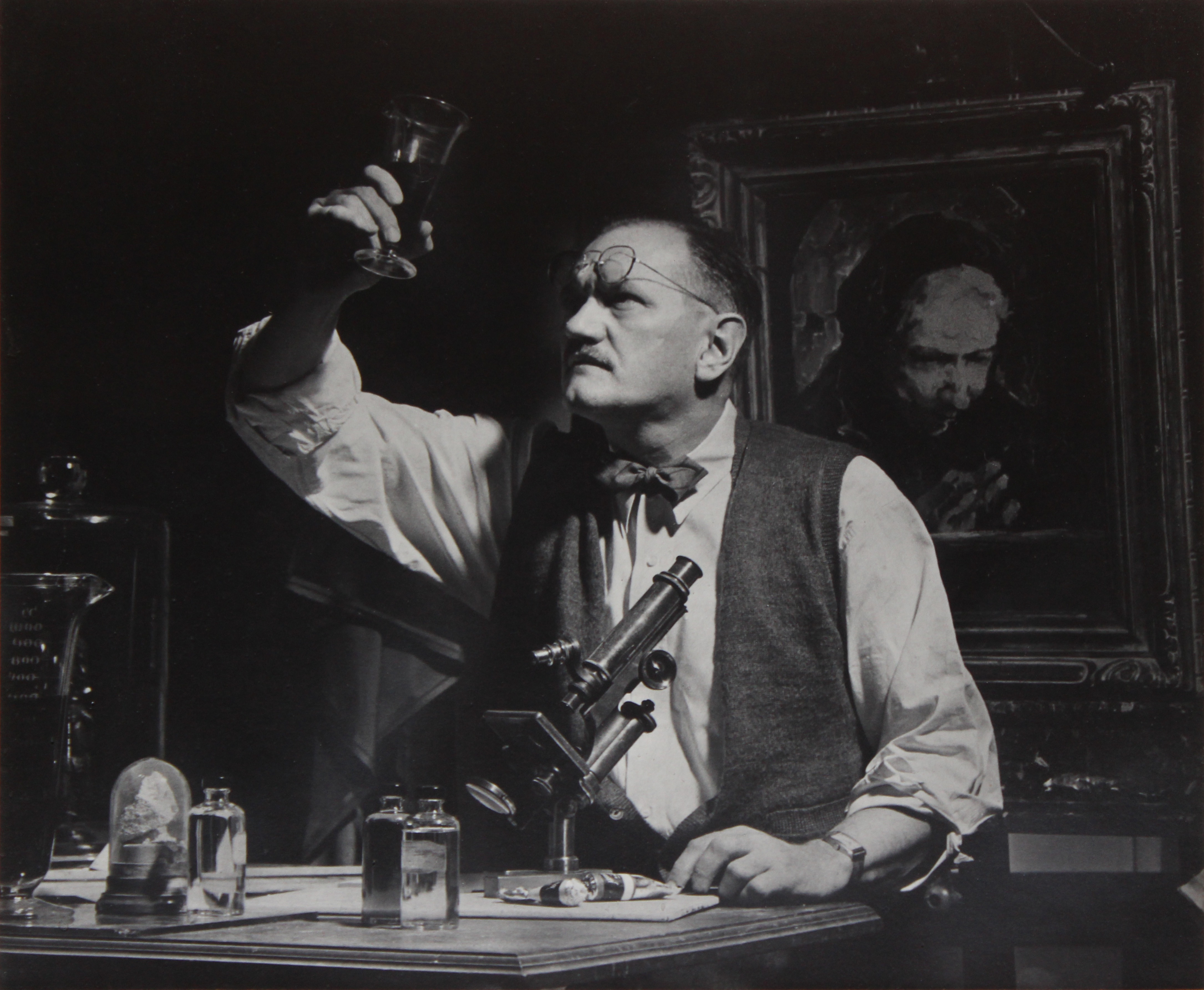
- Weber in his lab. One of his paintings is visible in the background.
- Born: December 1, 1890; Philadelphia, Pennsylvania
- Died: November 16, 1972 (aged 81)
- Citizenship: American
- Occupation(s): Chemist, artist, columnist, and businessman
- Employer(s): F. Weber & Co., Inc.

Frederick William Weber (December 1, 1890 – November 16, 1972) was a chemist, artist, columnist and businessman from Philadelphia, Pennsylvania. An expert on the chemistry and physics of paint materials, Weber served as treasurer, technical director and eventually president of F. Weber & Company, Inc., an artists’ supplies manufacturer founded in 1853. Weber developed new techniques for the manufacture of inks and pigments, and played a major role in the introduction of synthetic resins to the paint-making process.

In addition to his work with art supplies, Weber was an accomplished painter and was active in Philadelphia art circles. He served as art critic and head of the art department for The Philadelphia Record, and entered a number of his paintings into local shows and competitions. His artistic and technical knowledge led to friendships with several leading artists of his day, including Walter Emerson Baum and Maxfield Parrish, and Weber was sought for artistic advice by painters such as Norman Rockwell, Peter Hurd, and N.C. Wyeth.

== Early life and education ==
Weber was born on December 1, 1890, in Philadelphia, Pennsylvania. Weber's father, Frederick Theodore Weber (1845-1919), immigrated to the United States from Germany and began working for what was then a sales agency, Scholz and Company. In 1887, the company was sold to Weber, who reincorporated it as F. Weber & Company, Inc.

The younger Weber began working for his father at the age of 12, alongside his older brother Ernest. While Ernest began learning the business of manufacturing, Frederick chose to study art and chemistry.

Weber began his studies in the United States, but soon found there were no academic programs in America on the chemistry and physics of the fine arts. He then traveled to Germany, where he attended lectures and courses on this subject in Frankfurt-am-Main, Heidelberg, and Munich. Weber's artistic education included studies in portraiture and etching under B.A. Osnis, Edward Smith and Earl Horter.

== Career ==
Upon his return from Europe, Weber was appointed technical director of his F. Weber & Co., and in 1920, shortly after the death of his father, he was elected treasurer. His brother Ernest took over as president of the company. The First World War disrupted international trade and created opportunities for American art supply manufacturers, often considered second-rate compared to European firms, to gain credibility. The company began producing and selling its own line of products, many of which were developed by Frederick. One of these products, Permalba White, marked the first use of a titanium-based pigment, a nontoxic alternative to the common lead-based paints of the day. Weber also pioneered a range of oils, finishes, and varnishes made of synthetic resins rather than natural resins. This innovation proved important during the Second World War, when manufacturers faced a shortage of natural resin. The effectiveness of these products accelerated an industry-wide shift toward the use of synthetic materials in art supply manufacturing.

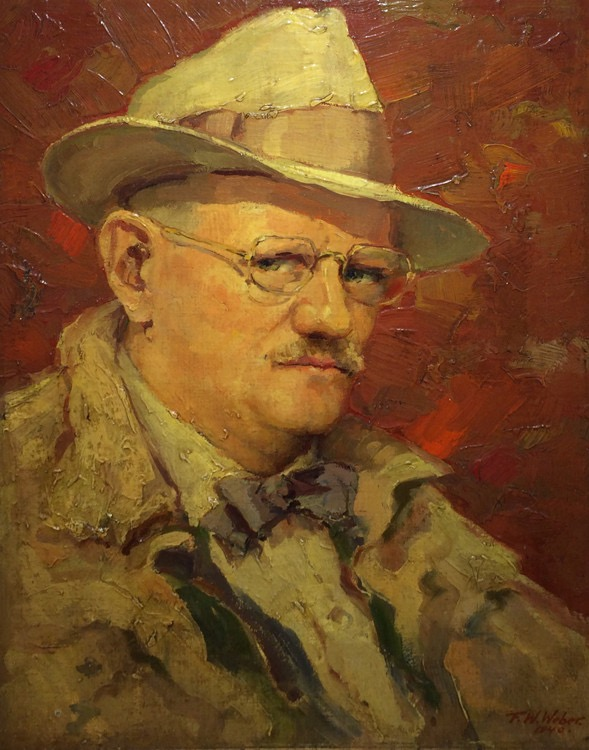
A self-portrait submitted by Weber to an exhibition of works by the Philadelphia Art Club in 1940. Weber painted the portrait using synthetic resins, a novelty at the time.

Weber remained active as an artist throughout his employment with F. Weber & Co. A member of the Art Club of Philadelphia, Weber submitted a self-portrait for the club's 46th annual exhibition. The painting was notable for its exclusive use of paints made with synthetic resins. During the Second World War, Weber visited Philadelphia-area hospitals with other portraitists to sketch wounded soldiers, drawing the men in uniform and omitting their scars and wounds. In 1952, Weber was commissioned to paint a portrait of Temple University president Robert L. Johnson.

Weber's expertise in the field of art materials made him an in-demand lecturer on the topic. He gave talks on the chemistry and physics of art-making at the Art Students’ League and the National Academy of Design in New York City, the Pennsylvania Academy of the Fine Arts in Philadelphia, and the Corcoran Art School in Washington, DC. His book on art materials, Artists’ Pigments — Their Chemical and Physical Properties, was called an ‘authoritative text’ by The Philadelphia Record.

An active member of the Philadelphia art community, Weber served as president and board member of the Philadelphia Sketch Club, the oldest artists’ club in the United States. He also sat on the board of the School of Industrial Arts, and was a member of the Art Club of Philadelphia and the Pennsylvania Academy of the Fine Arts.

Frederick was appointed president of F. Weber & Co. in 1962, following the death of his older brother.

In 1963, the Art Material Club honored Weber with the Industry Service Award “in recognition of his fifty years of outstanding service to the artist material industry.”

Weber retired from F. Weber & Co. in 1967, at the age of 77.

== Personal life ==
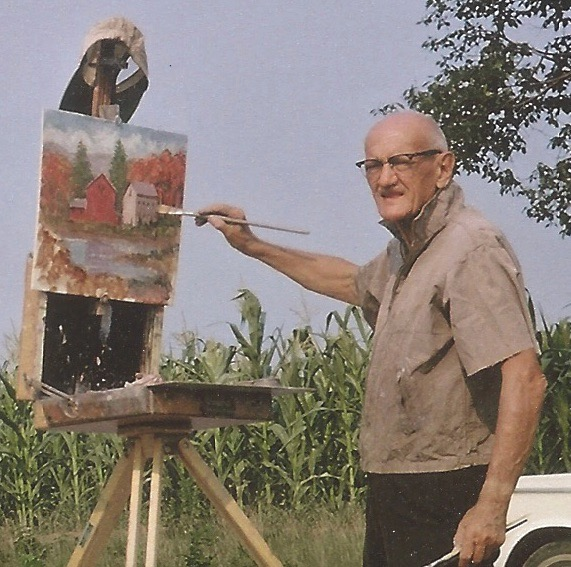
Weber outside, painting a landscape

Weber married twice. He had three children with his second wife, Margaret (née Driscoll).

Weber's aesthetic and technical knowledge of the fine arts brought him into contact with the leading painters of his day, including John Stueart Curry, John H. Geiszel, Walter Emerson Baum, T. Norman Mansell, Maxfield Parrish, and Edward C. Smith, Jr. B.A. Osnis, his friend and mentor, painted Weber's portrait. Weber was also close with the Wyeth family, particularly Andrew Wyeth. His closest friend was Gerald “Jerry” Aloysius Doyle, Jr., a Philadelphian political cartoonist.

Weber died of a heart attack in his home on November 16, 1972, at the age of 81.
