= Joseph J. Weiser =

American politician

Member of the New York State Assembly from New York's 6th district
- In office January 1, 1955 – December 31, 1962
- Preceded by: Irving Kirschenbaum
- Succeeded by: Paul J. Curran

Personal details
- Born: December 25, 1912 Poland
- Died: September 17, 2004 (aged 91) Hollywood, Florida
- Party: Democratic

Joseph J. Weiser (December 25, 1912 – September 17, 2004) was an American politician who served in the New York State Assembly from New York's 6th district from 1955 to 1962.

He died on September 17, 2004, in Hollywood, Florida at age 91.
