= Emily Gallagher =

American politician and community organizer from New York

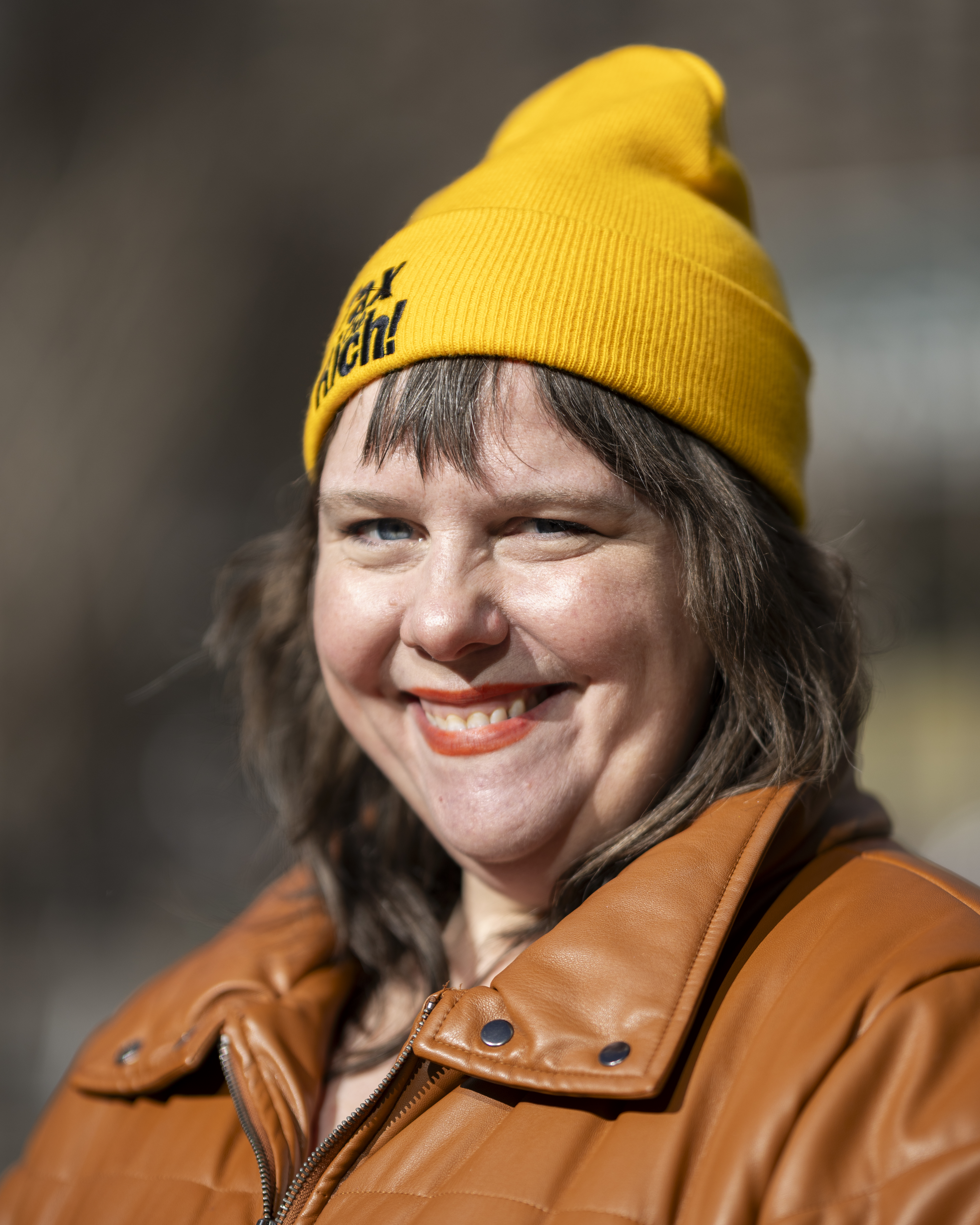

Member of the New York State Assembly from the 50th district
- Incumbent
- Assumed office January 1, 2021
- Preceded by: Joe Lentol
- Parliamentary group: New York State Socialists in Office

Personal details
- Born: March 23, 1984 (age 42) Fairfax, Virginia, U.S.
- Party: Democratic
- Other political affiliations: Democratic Socialists of America
- Education: Ithaca College (BA)
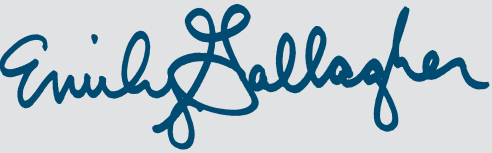
- Signature
- Website: State Assembly website

Emily E. Gallagher (born March 23, 1984) is an American politician. She is the Democratic representative serving District 50 in the New York State Assembly, which comprises Greenpoint and parts of Williamsburg, in the northern portion of the New York City borough of Brooklyn. She identifies as a Democratic Socialist.

== Early life ==
Gallagher grew up in a suburb of Rochester, New York, and moved to Greenpoint, Brooklyn shortly after graduating from Ithaca College in 2006. Before running for office, she worked as a museum educator and a non-profit community affairs director.

== Career ==
Gallagher became involved in politics while attending Ithaca College in 2002. After moving to Brooklyn in 2006, she became involved in neighborhood organizing, focusing on tenants' rights and environmental justice. Gallagher claims she was uninspired by local politicians, later becoming involved with the Brooklyn political organization New Kings Democrats. In 2016, New Kings Democrats approached Gallagher to consider a run for District Leader. Gallagher ran for Democratic leader of New York's 50th State Assembly district against 32-year incumbent Linda Minucci. She was endorsed by Congresswoman Nydia Velázquez and New York City Council Member Antonio Reynoso, but ultimately lost with 44.9% of the vote.

== New York State Assembly ==
On September 23, 2019, Gallagher launched a campaign against incumbent Joe Lentol for the Democratic primary to represent District 50 in the New York State Assembly. A member of the Brooklyn Democratic Socialists of America, she sought but did not receive their endorsement due to the chapter's limited capacity and desire to focus on building power in working-class communities of color.

During the COVID-19 pandemic, the campaign pivoted to completely rely on phone banking, text banking, video chat events, and holding virtual fundraisers. Their campaign was run with 25-30 core volunteers.

On primary election night, June 23, 2020, Gallagher trailed Lentol by 1,763 votes based on in-person totals. Once absentee ballots were counted, Gallagher was determined to have won by between 400 and 600 votes. In the final certified result, Gallagher won by 1,151 votes.

On June 28, 2022, Gallagher won the Democratic primary with 79.5% of the votes over Paddy O'Sullivan.

On June 25, 2024, Gallagher won the Democratic primary with 75% of the votes over Anathea Simpkins and Andrew Bodiford.

Gallagher was arrested alongside over 100 protestors at a September 2026 protest organized by Jewish Voice for Peace ahead of Israeli prime minister Benjamin Netanyahu's speech at the United Nations General Assembly.
