= Roland Park Pictures =

- Company type: Private
- Industry: Motion pictures, Television
- Headquarters: New York, New York
- Owner: Elizabeth Holder; Xan Parker
- Number of employees

Roland Park Pictures, Inc. was an independent production company founded by filmmakers Elizabeth Holder and Xan Parker.

== Founding ==
Holder and Parker had been childhood friends who "really did get their start performing plays on the staircase landing" of Parker's childhood home". They renewed their friendship after college when, during an accidental meeting, they discovered they were both working in the film industry. Parker had worked with Albert Maysles as an associate producer and Holder, who was a production assistant on Hairspray while still a teenager, had directed for Blues Clues. In 1999 they formed the production company, naming it after the Baltimore neighborhood of Roland Park where they'd grown up.

== Production ==
Roland Park's first film was the 2003 documentary feature Risk/Reward. The film documented the lives of four women working on Wall Street.

Roland Park also produced the documentary series The Hill and the fiction short Weekend Getaway.
