= Fort Hamilton High School =

Public school in New York City

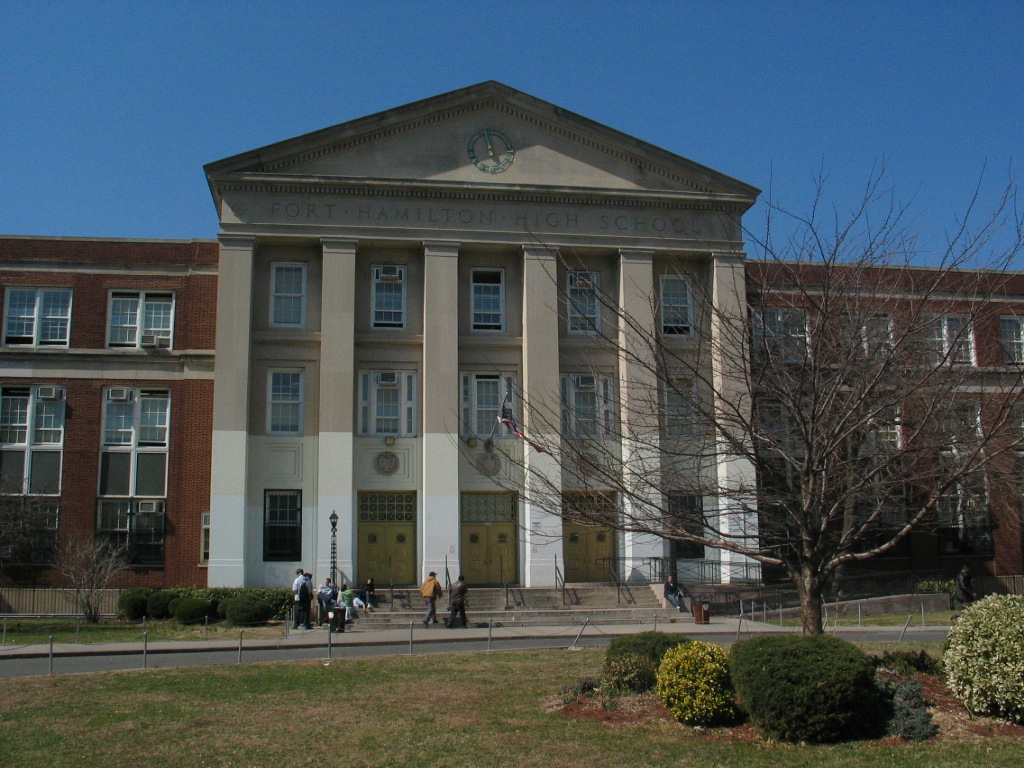

Location
- 8301 Shore Rd; Brooklyn, New York 11209; United States; 40°37′38″N 74°02′22″W

Information
- Type: Public
- Motto: Excellence in Education
- Established: 1941
- School district: New York City Department of Education
- NCES School ID: 360015101952
- Principal: Kaye Houlihan
- Teaching staff: 250.32 (on an FTE basis)
- Grades: 9-12
- Enrollment: 4,232 (2021-2022)
- Student to teacher ratio: 16.91
- Campus: City: Large
- Colors: Navy Blue and White
- Mascot: Tigers
- Newspaper: The Pilot
- Yearbook: Tower
- Website: www.fthhs.org

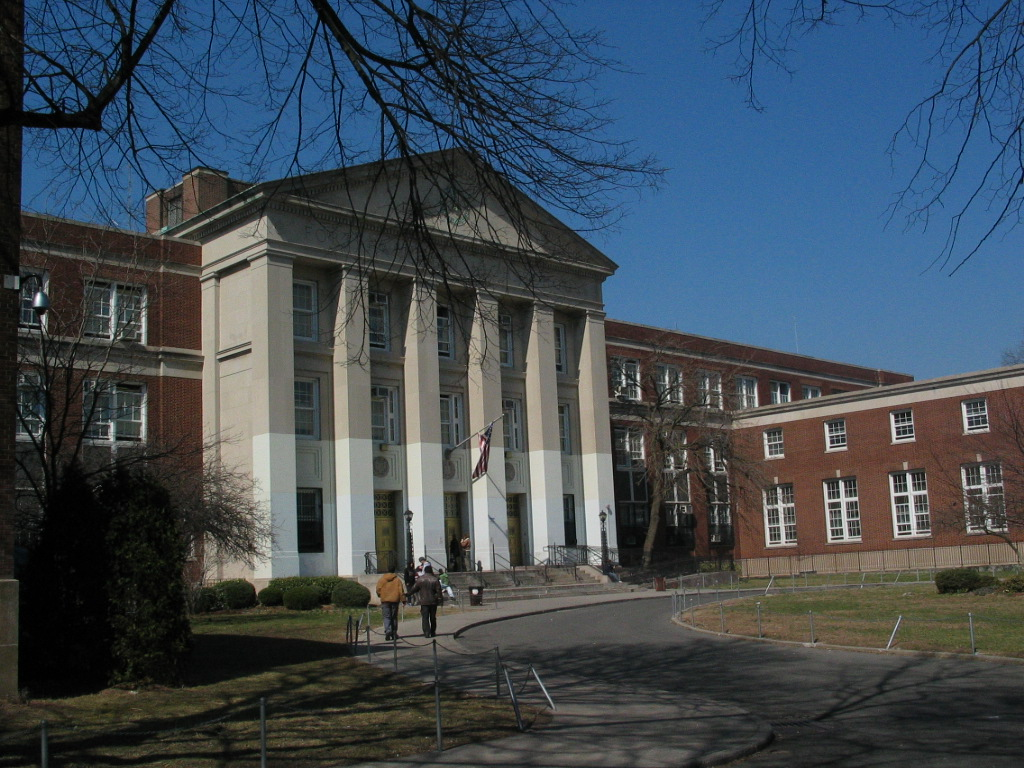
Front entrance

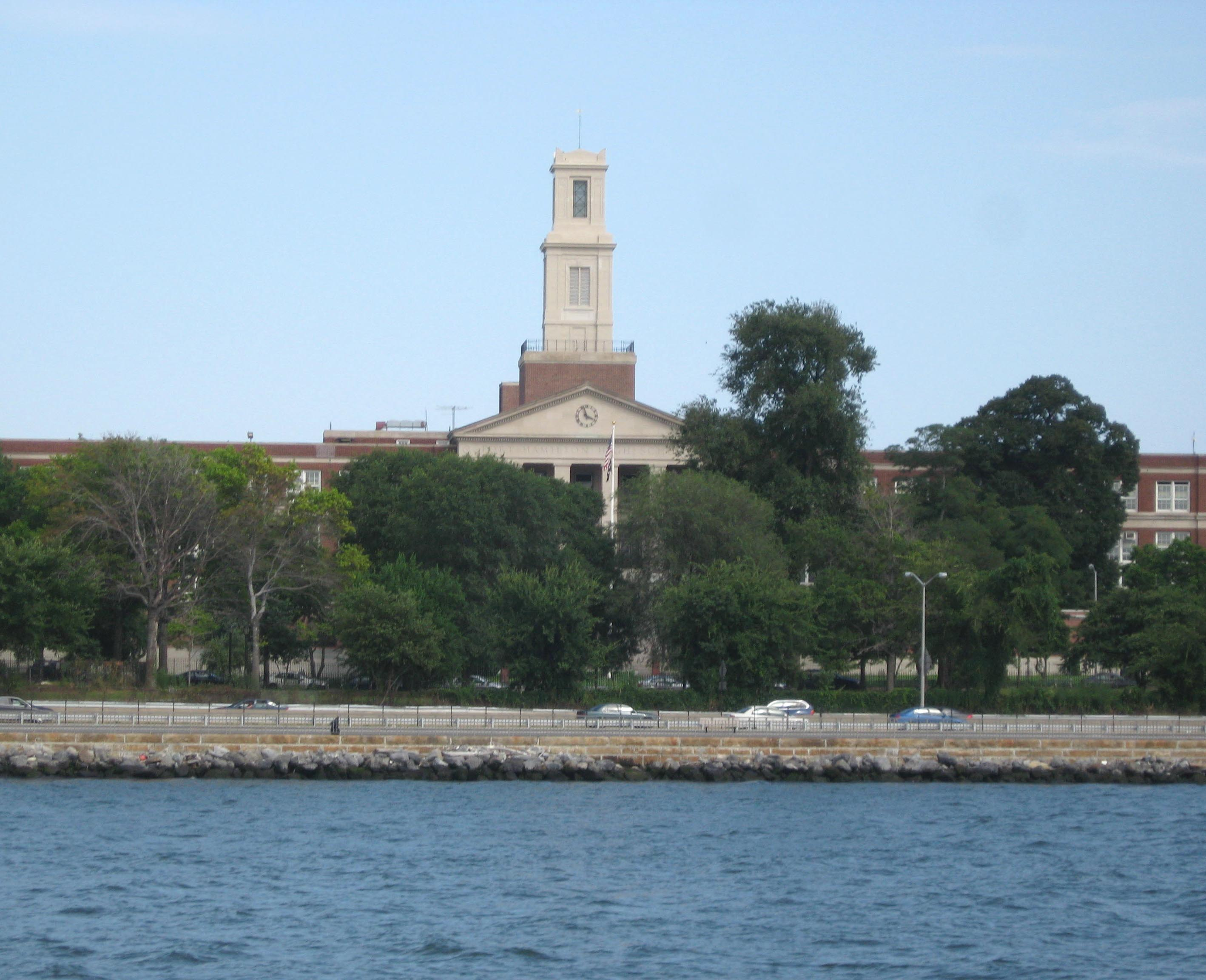
From the Bay

Fort Hamilton High School (HS 490) is a public high school in Brooklyn, New York, United States, under the jurisdiction of the New York City Department of Education. Students in Bay Ridge, Sunset Park and Dyker Heights are zoned to Fort Hamilton HS. It is named for the Army garrison at Fort Hamilton.

Ground was broken by then mayor Fiorello LaGuardia on September 23, 1940 and the school opened at 8301 Shore Road on September 8, 1941 at the location of the former Crescent Athletic Club.

== Notable alumni ==
- Stephen Antonakos (1926–2013), sculptor known for his abstract sculptures and for being a pioneer in the use of neon in art
- Bill Antonello (1927–1933), Major League Baseball (MLB) player
- Jean Balukas (1959, class of 1977), professional pool player, youngest inductee into the BCA Hall of Fame
- Stephen Chan (Class of 1984), New York State Senator
- James Fyfe (1942–2005), criminologist and professor of criminal justice at the John Jay College of Criminal Justice, Temple University and American University
- Vincent J. Gentile (born 1959, class of 1977), New York City Councilman and State Senator
- Jephté Guillaume, multi-instrumentalist, DJ and producer
- Paul Jabara (1948–1992, class of 1965), actor and Academy Award-winning songwriter
- Letitia James (born 1958), lawyer, politician, Attorney General of New York and City Public Advocate; the first African-American and first woman to hold each of those posts
- Jaiquawn Jarrett (born 1989), NFL safety for the New York Jets
- Bruce Johannesson (born 1962), lead guitarist for the rock band Poison under the stage name 'C.C. DeVille'
- Albert King (born 1959, class of 1977), National Basketball Association (NBA) player
- Bernard King (born 1956), NBA All-Star
- Frank Layden (1932-2025), coach and executive of the NBA's Utah Jazz
- Julio Lugo (1975–2021), MLB player
- Christopher J. Mega (1930–2011), lawyer, politician, New York Supreme Court Justice, State Senator and State Assemblyman
- Danny Nee (born 1945), longtime basketball head coach at USMMA, Duquesne University, University of Nebraska–Lincoln, and Ohio University
- Lana Parrilla (born 1977), actress best known for Once Upon a Time
- George Preti (1944–2020), analytical organic chemist whose research focused on the nature, origin, and functional significance of human odors
- Fred Samara (born 1950), competitor in the men's decathlon at the 1976 Summer Olympics
- Neil M. Stevenson (1930–2009), rear admiral, Chief of U.S. Navy Chaplains
- Janet Yellen (born 1946, class of 1963), economist, U.S. Secretary of the Treasury and Chair of the Federal Reserve (2014–2018); the first woman to hold either post
