= Vincent J. Gentile =

American politician

Vincent Gentile
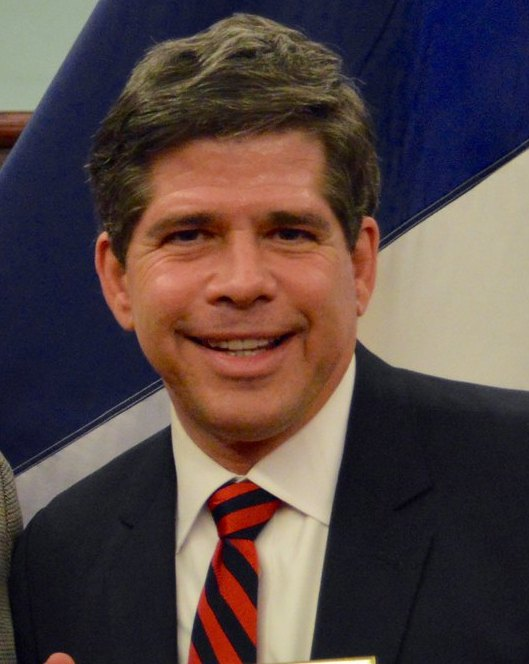

Member of the New York City Council from the 43rd district
- In office March 18, 2003 – December 31, 2017
- Preceded by: Marty Golden
- Succeeded by: Justin Brannan

Member of the New York State Senate from the 23rd district
- In office January 1, 1997 – December 31, 2002
- Preceded by: Robert DiCarlo
- Succeeded by: Marty Golden (redistricting)

Personal details
- Born: Vincent Joseph Gentile; January 3, 1959 (age 67) Brooklyn, New York, U.S.
- Party: Democratic
- Education: Cornell University (BA); Fordham University (JD)
- Profession: Attorney
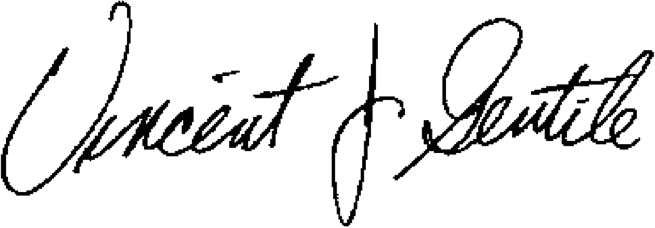
- Signature

Vincent Joseph "Vinnie" Gentile (born January 3, 1959) is an American politician who served in the New York City Council from the 43rd district from 2003 to 2017. He is a Democrat. The district includes Bath Beach, Bay Ridge, Bensonhurst, and Dyker Heights in Brooklyn.

== Life and career ==
Gentile was born into an Italian-American family in the Bay Ridge neighborhood of Brooklyn. He attended Fort Hamilton High School, graduating in 1977 and, in 1983, became founding president of the school's alumni association. He went on to receive a B.A. in Government from Cornell University and a J.D. from Fordham University School of Law. He was first admitted to the New York state bar in 1986.

Prior to his involvement in electoral politics, Gentile was a prosecutor in the office of the Queens County District Attorney. There he served for 11 years as an Assistant District Attorney under Richard A. Brown.

Following losing an election for the New York Senate in 1994, Gentile first won public office in 1996, when he was able to capitalize upon internal divisions within the Republican Party and win a three-way race for the 23rd district in the New York State Senate. He served three terms before being defeated by then City Councilman Martin J. "Marty" Golden in 2002. Facing a tough campaign mostly due to redistricting, he lost 55% to 45%.

Gentile was the Democratic candidate for New York's 11th congressional district special election in 2015. He lost to Republican Richmond County District Attorney Daniel M. Donovan, Jr. Green Party candidate, James Lane, came in third.

Gentile unsuccessfully sought the position of Kings County District Attorney in 2017. He lost the Democratic Party primary to Eric Gonzalez and then lost to Gonzalez again in the general election where Gentile ran under the Reform Party line.

== New York City Council ==
Following his defeat for reelection to the Senate, Gentile entered into the special election to fill Golden's city council seat in 2003. In a field of five candidates, four of whom were Democrats, Gentile edged out a win against Republican Rosemarie O'Keefe by 31 votes. Gentile served in the New York City Council for 14 years until his successor was inaugurated in January 2018 due to Gentile’s term limits. He chaired the Select Committee on Libraries in the Council, and served on the Aging, Cultural Affairs, Finance, and Public Safety committees. He was also the chair of the Council's Italian-American Caucus.

Election history
| Location | Year | Election | Results |
|---|---|---|---|
| NY Senate District 23 | 1994 | General | √ Robert DiCarlo (R) 55.12% Vincent Gentile (D) 40.93% Arnaldo Ferraro (Right to Life) 3.95% |
| NY Senate District 23 | 1996 | General | √ Vincent Gentile (D) 50.19% John M. Gangemi (R) 31.57% Robert DiCarlo (Conservative) 18.25% |
| NY Senate District 23 | 1998 | General | √ Vincent Gentile (D) 54.02% Christopher Mega (R) 45.01% Thomas W. Hamilton (I) .61% John P. Walker (Liberal) .36% |
| NY Senate District 23 | 2000 | General | √ Vincent Gentile (D) 61.53% Robert DiCarlo (R) 37.84% John P. Walker (Liberal) .63% |
| NY Senate District 22 | 2002 | General | √ Martin J. Golden (R) 54.65% Vincent Gentile (D) 45.35% |
| NYC Council District 43 | 2003 | Special | √ Vincent Gentile (D) 30.20% Rosemarie O'Keefe (R) 29.91% Joanne Seminara (D) 25.47% Steve Harrison (D) 7.23% Carlo Scissura (D) 6.40% |
| NYC Council District 43 | 2003 | General | √ Vincent Gentile (D) 54.46% Pat Russo (R) 45.54% |
| NYC Council District 43 | 2005 | General | √ Vincent Gentile (D) 55.29% Pat Russo (R) 44.71% |
| NYC Council District 43 | 2009 | General | √ Vincent Gentile (D) 61.70% Rick Capano (R) 38.30% |
| NYC Council District 43 | 2013 | General | √ Vincent Gentile (D) 62.76% John Quaglione (R) 35.50% Patrick Dwyer (Green) 1.64% |
| New York's 11th District | 2015 | Special | √ Daniel Donovan (R) 58.33% Vincent Gentile 40.11% James Lane (Green) 1.33% |

Political offices
| Preceded by Martin J. Golden | New York City Council, 43rd district 2003-2017 | Succeeded by Justin Brannan |
| Preceded by Robert DiCarlo | New York State Senate, New York's 23rd State Senate district 1997-2002 | Succeeded by Martin J. Golden |
