= F. Weber & Company, Inc. =

F. Weber & Company, Inc. is an American manufacturer and supplier of artists' materials. Established in 1853 in Philadelphia, Pennsylvania, the F. Weber Company, Inc. is the oldest and one of the largest manufacturers of art materials in the United States.

== Background ==
F. Weber & Co. was a successor company to Janentzky & Weber Manufacturers & Importers, F. Weber & Company, Inc. was established in 1853,

Following the death of Fredrick W. Weber Sr. in 1919, his two sons Fred W. Weber and Ernest Weber had the company incorporated and renamed it F. Weber Co., Inc. Fred W. Weber was responsible for much of the innovation in product development from taking over in 1919 to his retirement in 1967. He provided advice to many 20th century artists, including: Thomas Hart Benton, Dean Cornwell, Arthur Dove, Peter Hurd, Norman Rockwell, NC Wyeth, and Andrew Wyeth. At this time the company had its factory and headquarters in Philadelphia, Pennsylvania, and retail locations in Philadelphia, Baltimore, and St. Louis.

The company was bought by Visual Art Industries of Brooklyn, NY in 1980. The company is now officially the Martin F. Weber Co. and still produces a variety of art supplies, including the original non-toxic white color "Permalba" formulated by Fred W. Weber himself in 1921. The modern company is also known for its artists signature kits designed for television artists such as Jon Gnagy, Bob Ross, Susan Schewe, Robert Wyland and Bruce Blitz.

== See also ==
- List of pen types, brands and companies
