= Florence M. Sullivan =

American lawyer and politician (1930–2020)

Florence Sullivan

Member of the New York State Assembly from the 50th district
- In office January 1, 1979 – December 31, 1983
- Preceded by: Christopher J. Mega
- Succeeded by: Joseph R. Lentol

Personal details
- Born: Florence Grady; January 20, 1930 New York City, U.S.
- Died: June 21, 2020 (aged 90) New York City, U.S.
- Party: Republican
- Education: St. John's University, New York (BA, JD)

Florence M. Sullivan (January 20, 1930 – June 21, 2020) was an American lawyer and politician from New York who served in the New York State Assembly from the 50th district from 1979 to 1983.

== Life ==
She was born Florence Grady on January 20, 1930, in Brooklyn. She married, and raised three children in Bay Ridge, Brooklyn. Then she went back to school, earned a college degree, and taught high school. She graduated from St. John's University School of Law in 1974, was admitted to the bar in 1975, and worked as an Assistant D.A. of Kings County. She also entered politics as a Republican.

She was a member of the New York State Assembly from 1979 to 1982, sitting in the 183rd and 184th New York State Legislatures.

In 1982, she ran in the Republican primary for U.S. Senator from New York, and defeated Whitney North Seymour, Jr. and Muriel Siebert. Sullivan was also nominated on the Conservative and the Right to Life tickets to oppose the incumbent Democrat Daniel Patrick Moynihan at the United States Senate election in New York, 1982, but Moynihan scored a decisive victory over Sullivan, polling almost the double number of votes.

She was a partner in the New York City law firm of Connors & Sullivan.

Sullivan died in Brooklyn on June 21, 2020, aged 90.

New York State Assembly
Preceded by Christopher Mega	Member of the New York Assembly from the 50th district 1979–1983	Succeeded by Joseph Lentol
Party political offices
Preceded by James Buckley	Republican nominee for U.S. Senator from New York (Class 1); 1982	Succeeded by Robert McMillan
