= Mansell, Lewis & Fugate =

Mansell, Lewis & Fugate was an architectural firm established in 1955 by architects Thomas Norman Mansell, Richard Arnold Lewis, and Edwin Lindsay Fugate, as the direct successor to the firm, T. Norman Mansell, established in 1938. The firm was based at 300 E. Lancaster Avenue Wynnewood, Pennsylvania 19096 and practiced in Delaware, Georgia, Kentucky, Maryland, Michigan, Minnesota, New Jersey, New York, North Carolina, Ohio, Pennsylvania, South Carolina, and Virginia. The firm often worked with Lutheran clients. The firm's work at Wittenberg University Chapel was awarded the excellence of design award by the Guild Religious Architecture in 1957. The firm continued to practice until 1969 when the partnership was dissolved.

== Works ==
- 1956: Wittenberg University Weaver Chapel
- 1956: Wittenberg UniversityLibrary
- 1958: St. Peter's Lutheran Church (Miami, Florida)
- 1960: Leeds & Northrup Research & Development Laboratory (North Wales, Pennsylvania)
- 1960: LCA Publication House Office Building (Philadelphia, Pennsylvania) Research & Development Laboratory (North Wales, Pennsylvania)
- 1960: Resurrection Evangelical Lutheran Church, Arlington, Virginia (as MANSELL, McGETTIGAN, FUGATE & RAPP) (p. 69)
- 1968: Leeds & Northrup Company Engineering Center (North Wales, Pennsylvania)
