= Wittenberg University =

Private university in Springfield, Ohio, U.S.

- Former name: Wittenberg College (1845–1957)
- Motto: "Having Light, We Pass It On to Others"
- Type: Private liberal arts college
- Established: 1845; 181 years ago
- Religious affiliation: Evangelical Lutheran Church in America
- Academic affiliations: Annapolis Group
- Endowment: $108 million (2023)
- President: Christian M. M. Brady
- Provost: Brian D. Yontz
- Academic staff: 102 full-time
- Undergraduates: about 1,326
- Postgraduates: 44
- Location: Springfield, Ohio, U.S. 39°56′06″N 83°48′45″W
- Campus: Small city, 114 acres (46 ha)
- Colors: Red and white
- Sporting affiliations: NCAA Division III – NCAC; CWPA
- Mascot: Ezry the Tiger
- Website: wittenberg.edu

Wittenberg University (officially Wittenberg College) is a private liberal arts college in Springfield, Ohio, United States. It had 1,326 full-time students drawn from 33 states and 9 foreign countries in 2022. Wittenberg University is associated with the Evangelical Lutheran Church in America. Although the college is accredited by the Higher Learning Commission, it was placed on probation in November 2025 for not meeting HLC criteria related to financial management.

== History ==
Wittenberg College was founded in 1845 by a group of ministers in the English Evangelical Lutheran Synod of Ohio, which had previously separated from the recently established German-speaking Evangelical Lutheran Joint Synod of Ohio and Other States. The college was named for the historic University of Wittenberg in Wittenberg, Germany, the town in which Martin Luther famously posted his Ninety-five Theses on the church door on October 31, 1517.

A German American pastor of the Evangelical Lutheran Church, the Rev. Ezra Keller was the principal founder and first president of the college. Its initial focus was to train clergy with the Hamma School of Divinity as its theological department. One of its main missions was to "Americanize" Lutherans by teaching courses in the English language instead of German, unlike the nearby Capital University in Columbus, Ohio.

The first class originally consisted of eight students at the beginning of the academic year, but grew to seventy-one by the end. With a faculty of one professor and two tutors, classes were held in Springfield, Ohio, in a church on land that was donated. That city was selected for its location on the National Road, running from the eastern cities of Baltimore and Cumberland, Maryland, to the west in the Illinois Country, eventually to the territorial capital of Vandalia, near the Mississippi River.

In 1874, women were admitted to the college, and, the following year, the first black students were admitted. The college attained university status in 1957 and was renamed accordingly. In 1993, the university and its namesake city Wittenberg entered into an official partnership.

In 1995, the American Philosophical Association censured Wittenberg University when the Wittenberg administration overruled the faculty personnel board and denied tenure to Leemon McHenry, a member of the faculty. The university was sanctioned in 2021 by the American Association of University Professors (AAUP), for discontinuing eight academic programs and firing two tenured faculty members without, in the AAUP's opinion, respecting faculty rights.

=== Hamma Divinity School ===
Luther Alexander Gotwald, Professor of Theology in the Hamma Divinity School that served as the theological department of the college, was famously tried for and unanimously acquitted of heresy by the board of directors at Wittenberg on April 4–5, 1893. The trial concerned many key issues that Evangelical Lutherans still debate today.

For decades, Hamma and Wittenberg were associated with the local English-speaking regional Lutheran synods in the Midwest.

In 1978, Hamma Divinity School merged with the nearby Evangelical Lutheran Theological Seminary (associated with Capital University) in the Bexley suburb of Columbus, Ohio, to form Trinity Lutheran Seminary.

=== Presidents ===
- Ezra Keller (1844–1848)
- Samuel Sprecher (1849–1874)
- John B. Helwig (1874–1882)
- Samuel Alfred Ort (1882–1900)
- John M. Ruthrauff (1900–1902)
- Charles G. Heckert (1903–1920)
- Rees Edgar Tulloss (1920–1949)
- Clarence Charles Stoughton (1949–1963)
- John Nissley Stauffer (1963–1968)
- G. Kenneth Andeen (1969–1974)
- William A. Kinnison (1974–1995)
- Baird Tipson (1995–2004)
- William H. Steinbrink (Interim President)
- Mark H. Erickson (2005–2012)
- Laurie M. Joyner (2012–2015)
- Richard "Dick" Helton (2016–2017) (Interim President)
- Michael Frandsen (2017–2025)
- Christian M. M. Brady (2025–present)

== Academics ==
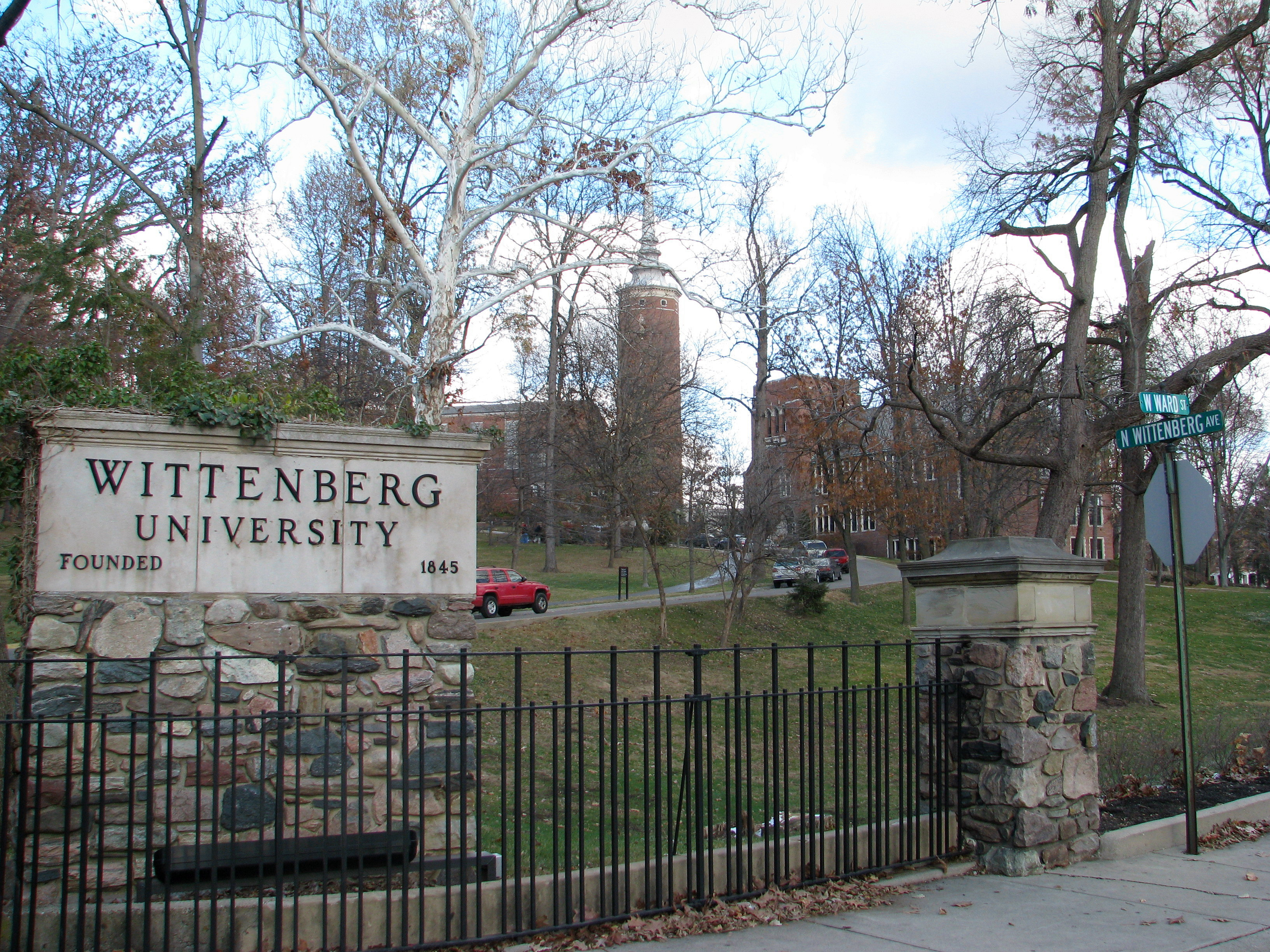
Main entrance to the university

Wittenberg offers more than 70 majors and special programs. Eight pre-professional programs are offered to students, 70 percent of whom eventually pursue graduate studies. The institution's science facilities are housed in the Barbara Deer Kuss Science Center. Wittenberg's art department is housed in Koch Hall. Thomas Library contains 400,000 volumes and provides access to OhioLINK, a consortium of Ohio college and university libraries and the State Library of Ohio. The library houses the Kemper Special Collection Area which contains the Luther-Reformation Collection with more than 400 items written by Martin Luther and his contemporaries between 1517 and 1580. The library was built in 1956 to the designs of Thomas Norman Mansell of Mansell, Lewis & Fugate of Wynnewood, Pennsylvania.

The university is accredited by the Higher Learning Commission (HLC). In March 2025, HLC assigned Wittenberg a financial distress designation, following an audit by the U.S Department of Education which raised "...substantial doubt about the institution's ability to continue as a going concern". Wittenberg administrators said the audit was based on prior years' finances and that those matters had been addressed. Despite such assurances, the Higher Learning Commission placed Wittenberg on probation as of November 6, 2025. According to the HLC, Wittenberg has not demonstrated that "the institution's financial and personnel resources effectively support its current operations".

== Campus ==
=== Blair Hall ===
Blair Hall houses the university's Education Department, the Psychology Department, and the School of Graduate and Professional Studies. In addition, the Springfield-Wittenberg Teacher Institute is located in Blair.

The education department occupies a second building at 49 East College Avenue that formerly contained the administration offices of the Springfield Public City Schools, but is now owned by Wittenberg University.

=== Carnegie Hall ===
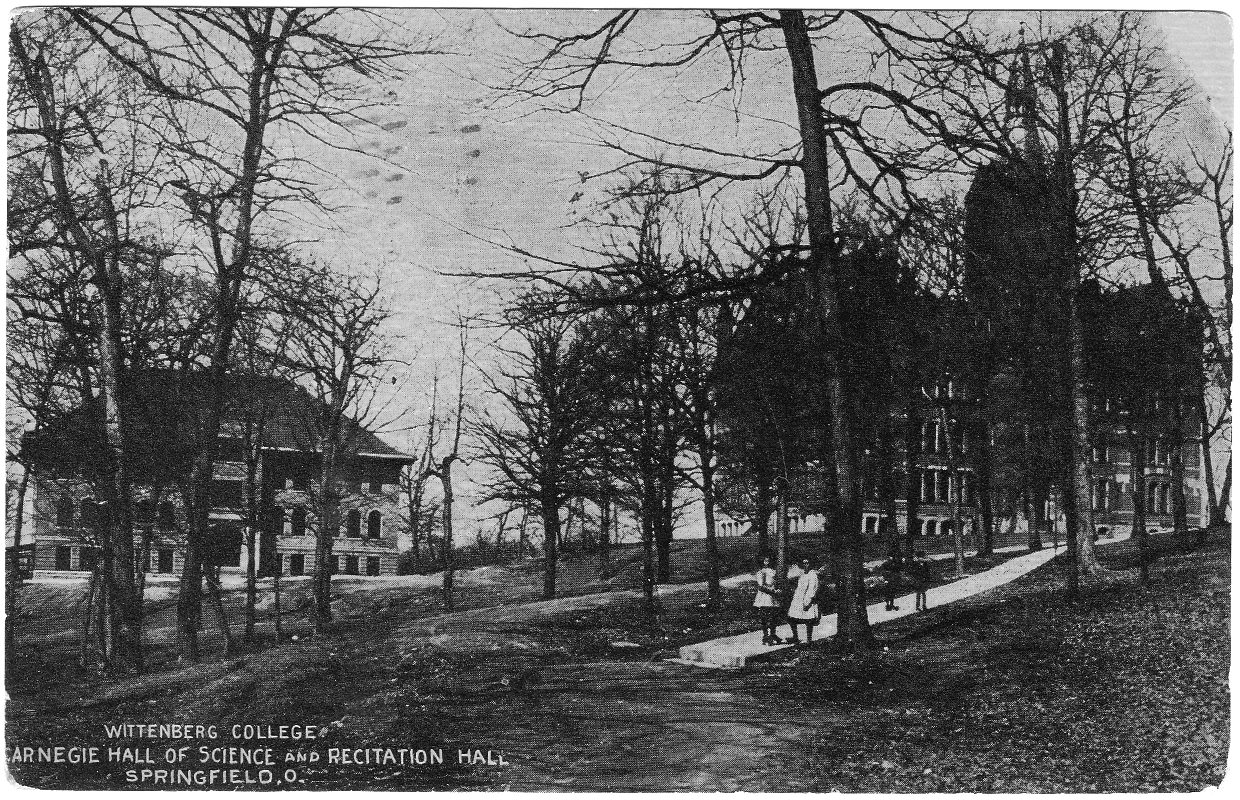
Carnegie Hall of Science and Recitation Hall (1911 Postcard)

Built in 1909, Carnegie Hall was named for the famous Scottish-American immigrant and steel industrialist Andrew Carnegie, (1835–1919), who was known for his philanthropy and endowment of many public library buildings across the country. Until 1967, Carnegie Hall was exclusively a science building until the athletics department began holding conferences and classes in the same area. Carnegie Hall is current offline, awaiting renovations and updates.

=== Hollenbeck Hall ===
Hollenbeck Hall is home to the History, English, Political Science, International Studies, and Philosophy departments, and the Office of International Education. The building's six wings, two per floor, are separated by the Ness Family Auditorium in the center of the building.

Springfield City's organization called is also housed in Hollenbeck Hall. Upward Bound is a high school program for students in low-income areas of the city to receive a high-level education from college professors while in high school.

=== Barbara Deer Kuss Science Center ===
The Barbara Deer Kuss Science Center houses ten academic departments in the fields of mathematics and natural sciences. It also serves as a popular breakfast and lunch location for students, as it includes a vendor on the first floor that can be used with the Wittenberg meal plans.

=== Recitation Hall ===
Recitation Hall was the second building erected on the campus. It contains many of the university's administrative offices, including admissions, financial aid, president's office, provost's, student employment, university communications (Wittenberg's Media office for "Wittenberg Magazine", Press office, New Media, Sports Media, and Publications office), and human resources. Recitation Hall also has its own chapel. In 1883, classes were first held in Recitation Hall. A building behind Recitation Hall serves as the university's police and security headquarters, the campus switchboard and the transportation office.

=== Synod Hall ===
Synod Hall was home to the Department of Sociology and Information Technologies (IT), but was closed in 2022.

=== Zimmerman Hall ===
Zimmerman Hall was home to the Department of Psychology. The building has since been shut down but still remains an important part of Wittenberg's campus.

=== Shouvlin Center ===
Shouvlin Center houses the Office of Residence Life and Housing, the Womyn's Center, Counseling Services, and Medical Services.

=== Thomas Library ===
Thomas Library is Wittenberg's main library. The three-story building holds over 500,000 books and resources. Wittenberg is also a member of OhioLINK. As of 2024, Thomas Library partnered with the Clark County Public Library (CCPL) to include a digital AutoLend Library on the library's main floor. With a CCPL library card, the AutoLend Library allows students to check out books digitally and br provided to them the same day, without having to leave campus for additional resources.

Thomas Library houses the Math Workshop and the Writing Center, two predominantly student-run organizations to help students strengthen their math and writing skills with fellow student-tutors.

=== The Steemer ===
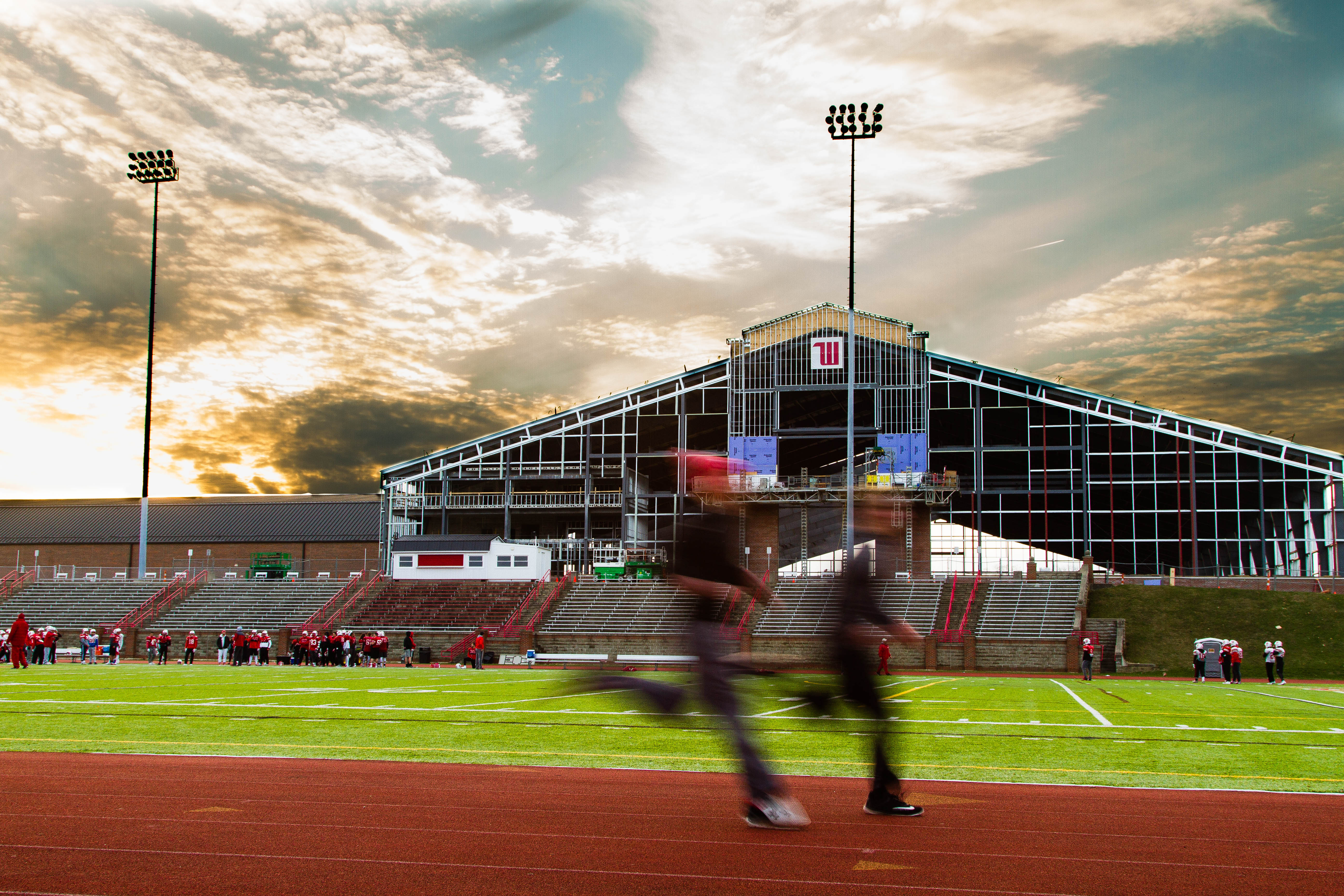
Wittenberg Track and Field runners practice in front of The Steemer Indoor Fieldhouse on November 8, 2018.

In April 2017, Wittenberg University broke ground on the development of a $40 million health, wellness, and athletics facility to supplement the existing Health Physical Education and Recreation (HPER) Center. This project will include the renovation of the university's 1929 Field House, 1982 HPER Center, and include a new indoor practice field, classrooms, and locker rooms. The project is expected to be completed by the end of 2019. In September 2018, it was announced the facility would be named "The Steemer", after the company Stanley Steemer, whose CEO, Wes Bates, is a graduate of Wittenberg and a major financial sponsor of the project.

== Student organizations ==
The university has over 50 active, registered student organizations, ranging from student-led organizations to Academic and Honor Societies.

=== Hagen Center for Civic and Urban Engagement ===
Wittenberg University opened the Hagen Center for Civic and Urban Engagement on September 24, 2008, to help coordinate community service projects. It builds partnerships between the university and city, state and federal governments. Kristen Collier is the director.

=== Womyn's Center ===
The university's Womyn's Center is located in Shouvlin Center. It has included the Peer Advocate program since 2016, providing advocacy services for survivors of power-based violence (regardless of gender identity). The Womyn's Center also houses Tiger Health Educators, a peer-to-peer education program that offers training and resources regarding sexual health and consent.

=== William A. McClain Center for Diversity ===
The William A. McClain Center for Diversity is located on Alumni Way and is named for the noted African American graduate from Wittenberg University in 1934 William Andrew McClain. Wittenberg also has several multicultural student programs that are supported by the diversity center including Shades of Pearl, Concerned Black Students, the Gender and Sexuality Diversity Alliance, and the American International Association.

=== Radio station ===
The university had a student-run 24-hour radio station, WUSO, on 89.1 FM. WUSO simulcasts the Dayton classical station WDPR on weekday mornings, filling the remaining hours with news, politics, sports, food, and music shows. The Tiger Sports Network broadcasts the sports programming. The station's studios are located in the basement of Firestine Hall on Woodlawn Ave. The radio station's website allows audio streaming.

The launch of a new media program called the Integrated Media Corps has recently developed. A team of ten university students creates and produces news videos, sports highlight videos for Dayton, Ohio, television stations WDTN, WHIO, and WKEF and for the university website. The team also records news stories for WUSO and writes press releases for the university website. The program also has begun broadcasting sports programs on WIZE-AM in Springfield.

The university sold WUSO to Dayton Public Radio, Inc. effective March 13, 2023.

=== The Wittenberg Torch ===
The Torch is Wittenberg University's weekly student-run newspaper; it is staffed by news reporters, editors, features writers, sportswriters, designers and photographers. The paper was founded in 1873 and celebrated its 100th volume in 2012. In 2012, The Torch also won an ACP Online Pacemaker Award. In 2020, due to the COVID-19 pandemic, The Wittenberg Torch ended the print copies of their newspaper and moved to a fully digital format.

== Residence life ==
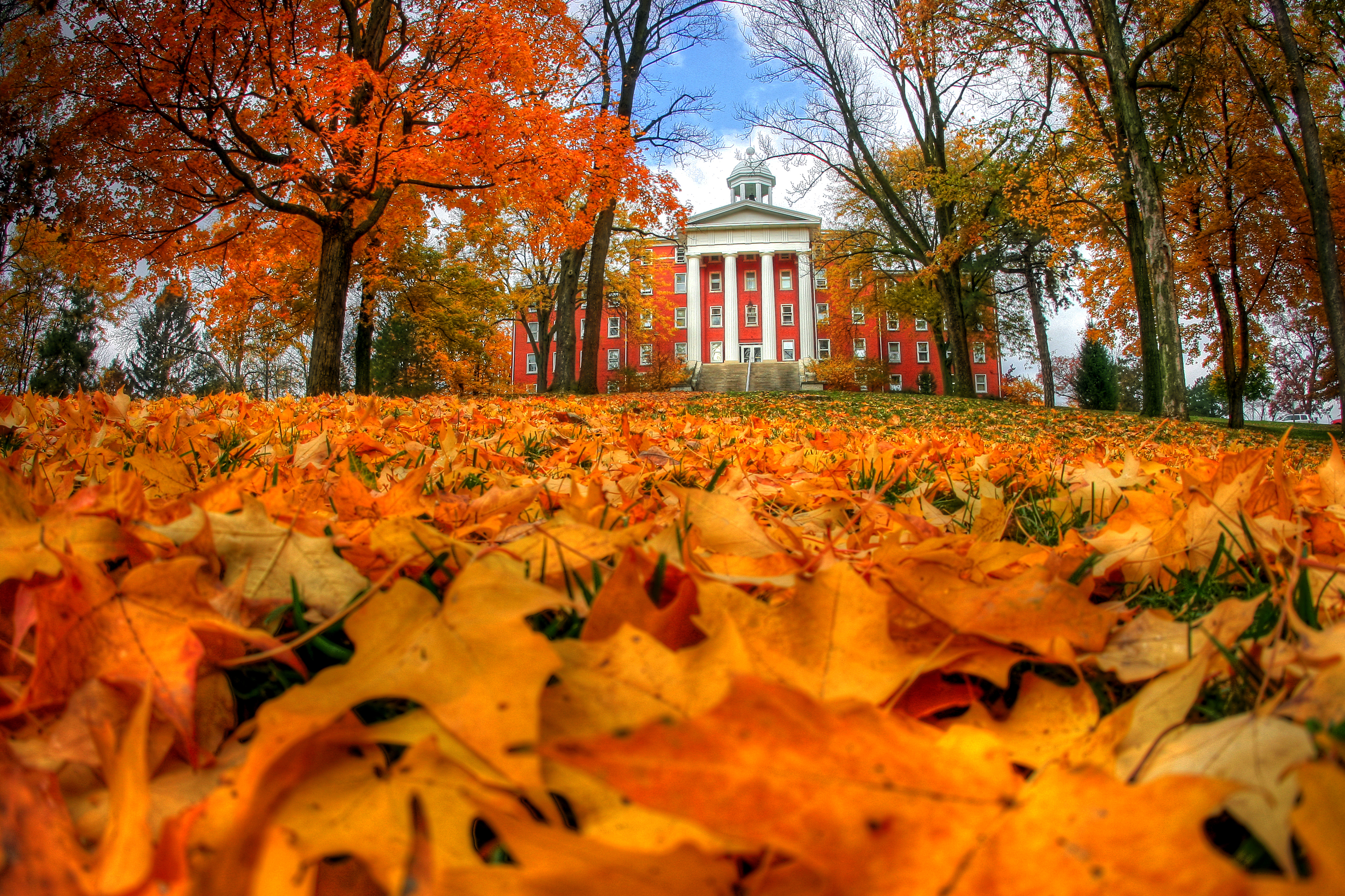
Myers Hall, built in 1846, was the first building at Wittenberg.

Wittenberg's residence halls on campus are Tower Hall, Myers Hall, Firestine Hall, Ferncliff Hall, Woodlawn Hall, New Residence Hall, and Polis House. Each residence hall includes TV-lounges, ping-pong tables, vending machines, cooking appliances, student printers, and laundry facilities. The only residence halls without air conditioning include Woodlawn Hall, Ferncliff Hall, and Myers Hall. Some residence halls include a technology or computer lab within the buildings, including Woodlawn, Myers, and New Hall.

Myers Hall is the oldest, the first campus building when the university opened. The building was added to the National Register of Historic Places in 1975. Myers Hall is four-stories tall, but does not include an elevator, as the build was finished in 1851. It has housed the University Honors Program for many years, but was eventually moved to Woodlawn Hall. Myers is currently offline, or unavailable for students to live in for the 2024–2025 academic year.

Right across from the University's President and Provost's residence, holds Ferncliff Hall with 151 students across four-floors. Including a vintage freight elevator, Ferncliff includes various amenities throughout the building and is in close proximity to the WittenBurbs (upperclassmen housing), Commencement Hollow, and Koch Hall.

Being closely located to the residence halls and Benham-Pence Student Center, the air conditioned and co-ed Firestine Hall is home to 220 students. Right outside of Firestine Hall includes recreational sports courts, including basketball and sand volleyball courts.

Another residence hall known for its central location on campus is Woodlawn Hall, a four-floor building with no elevator. Previously known as Beta Theta Pi's fraternity house until 1939, Woodlawn provides various amenities and houses the University Honors Program.

The newest residence hall, New Hall, opened in 2006. It is centrally located on campus and in close proximity to the Benham-Pence Student Center, Thomas Library, and Blair Hall. New Hall is co-ed, includes 3-floors with an elevator, and houses the Ubuntu Themed Living Community. Ubuntu, or "I am because we are," was created for students who seek an inclusive and diverse space of living, in specifically Black and Brown cultures. Students have compared New Hall to that of a hotel, given its interesting amenities. Previously, New Hall contained a higher tuition price than other residence halls on campus, but has since been equalized with the other six residence halls on campus since the COVID-19 pandemic beginning in 2020.

The Polis House was formerly the international residence hall on campus, and is now the Tiger Pride Themed Living Community, beginning in 2021. It is the gender-inclusive residence hall on campus, along with the first floor of Ferncliff Hall. Polis House is the smallest residence hall on campus, housing 30 students across all three floors, and contains no elevator.

The tallest building and residence hall on campus is Tower Hall, including 10 residential floors with two elevators, and is home for 230 students each year. Tower Hall includes various amenities and has a lively bottom-floor that includes a ping-pong table, laundry appliances, and a TV-lounge. Tower Hall is connected to, or adjacent with the University Theatre & Dance building, Chakeres Theatre.

Students who are at junior or senior standing have the option to live in the university-provided on-campus apartments or off-campus in apartments or university rental houses, as living on campus is required each year for full-time students.

The Benham-Pence Student Center houses most of the university's dining services. The main floor of the student center houses Post 95 which offers four different options, including Champ City Grill, Ward & Wood Subs, The Pour, and Ezra's (serving prepared-to-order stirfry). Founders Pub, in the basement of the student center, was opened in 2009. The Campus Dining Room is on the second floor of the Student Center along with the faculty dining room. Breakfast and lunch are also served on weekdays in the Barbara Deer Kuss Science Center's "Simply To Go" cafe. Beginning in the 2024–2025 school year, all students (Freshmen-Senior) are required to select a meal plan along with their housing accommodations.

== Greek life ==
Wittenberg has an active Greek Life community with ten fraternities or sororities currently chartered on campus.

Fraternities:

- Beta Theta Pi (Alpha Gamma chapter)
- Phi Kappa Psi (Ohio Beta chapter)
- Delta Tau Delta (Iota Beta chapter)
- Delta Sigma Phi (Beta Iota chapter)

Sororities:

- Alpha Delta Pi (Chi chapter)
- Delta Gamma (Gamma Rho chapter)
- Gamma Phi Beta (Alpha Nu chapter)
- Kappa Delta (Alpha Nu chapter)
- Sigma Kappa (Gamma Omega chapter)
- Alpha Xi Delta (Zeta chapter)

== Athletics ==
Wittenberg athletics logo

Wittenberg University teams participate as a member of the National Collegiate Athletic Association's Division III. The Tigers are a member of the North Coast Athletic Conference (NCAC). Men's sports include baseball, basketball, cross country, football, golf, lacrosse, soccer, swimming & diving, tennis, track & field and volleyball; while women's sports include basketball, cross country, field hockey, golf, lacrosse, soccer, softball, swimming & diving, tennis, track & field and volleyball. The school's newest varsity sport for men, volleyball, was added in the 2015–16 school year (2016 season); that team began play in the Midwest Collegiate Volleyball League (MCVL), left after the 2018 season for single-sport membership in the Allegheny Mountain Collegiate Conference, and returned to the MCVL after the 2020 season. The newest women's varsity sport, water polo, was added to the 2018–19 school year. That team plays in the Division III varsity division of the Collegiate Water Polo Association.

In 2017 the men's golf team won the Division III National Championship.

In 2017 the women's volleyball team competed in the NCAA Division III National Championship, rising to Division III runner-up.

Wittenberg ended the 2009 fall sports season ranked 16th among more than 430 NCAA Division III schools in the Learfield Sports Directors Cup standings, administered by the National Association of Collegiate Directors of Athletics (NACDA)
