= Paul J. Curran =

American politician and federal prosecutor

Paul Curran

United States Attorney for the Southern District of New York
- In office June 4, 1973 – October 31, 1975
- President: Richard Nixon; Gerald Ford
- Preceded by: Whitney North Seymour Jr.
- Succeeded by: Thomas Cahill

Member of the New York State Assembly from the 70th district
- In office January 1, 1966 – December 31, 1966
- Preceded by: Constituency established
- Succeeded by: Jose Ramos-Lopez

Member of the New York State Assembly from the New York County 6th district
- In office January 1, 1963 – December 31, 1965
- Preceded by: Joseph J. Weiser
- Succeeded by: Constituency abolished

Personal details
- Born: Paul Jerome Curran; February 21, 1933 New York City, New York, U.S.
- Died: September 4, 2008 (aged 75) New York City, New York, U.S.
- Party: Republican
- Education: Georgetown University (BA); Fordham University (LLB)

Paul Jerome Curran (February 21, 1933 – September 4, 2008) was an American Republican politician who served in the New York State Assembly and fought corruption as a federal prosecutor and as the state's commissioner of investigation.

== Early life and education ==
Curran was born on February 21, 1933, in Manhattan. He was the son of Thomas J. Curran (1898–1958), a prominent Manhattan Republican leader.

He attended Xavier High School. He graduated from Georgetown University in 1953, and from Fordham Law School in 1956.

== Career in law and politics ==
After serving as an officer in the United States Air Force, he spent three years prosecuting narcotics cases as an Assistant United States Attorney for the Southern District of New York.

Curran joined the law firm of Kaye Scholer LLP in 1961 and became a partner in 1969; except for his service as U.S. Attorney for the Southern District of New York from 1973 to 1975, he remained a partner at Kaye Scholer until 1996, when he took the role of special counsel with the firm.

Curran was a member of the New York State Assembly from 1963 to 1966, sitting in the 174th, 175th and 176th New York State Legislatures. On December 23, 1966, he was appointed by Mayor John V. Lindsay to help in the passing of laws concerning New York City by the State Legislature. He resigned from the State Assembly to take up the post with the Lindsay administration.

Governor Nelson Rockefeller appointed Curran to the New York State Commission of Investigation in 1968, elevating him to chairman the following year. Under his leadership, and despite the body's lack of authority to prosecute crimes they had uncovered, the Commission exposed kickbacks and fraud in Buffalo and Albany.

He was appointed by President Richard Nixon as U.S. Attorney for the Southern District of New York in 1973. He remained in office until 1975, obtaining convictions of Carmine Tramunti, the head of the Lucchese crime family, and Representative Bertram L. Podell. He obtained an indictment against nursing home operator Bernard Bergman, that later led to a guilty plea in a $1.2 million Medicaid fraud case. He was a consultant to the Pentagon on intelligence matters in 1976.

== Special counsel ==
In 1979, U.S. Attorney General Griffin Bell appointed Curran as a special counsel to investigate loans made to the peanut business owned by President Jimmy Carter by a bank controlled by Bert Lance, a friend of the president and the director of the Office of Management and Budget. Unlike Archibald Cox and Leon Jaworski who were named as special prosecutors to investigate the Watergate scandal, Curran's position as special counsel meant that he would not be able to file charges on his own, but would require the approval of Assistant Attorney General Philip Heymann. As special counsel, he became the first lawyer to question a sitting president under oath as part of an investigation of that president.

The investigation was concluded in October 1979, with Curran announcing that no evidence had been found to support allegations that funds loaned from the National Bank of Georgia had been diverted to Carter's 1976 presidential campaign.

== 1982 New York gubernatorial primary run ==
Curran entered the Republican primary race in 1982. Curran lost in the primary to Lewis Lehrman by a 4-1 margin. The gubernatorial election that was ultimately won by Democrat Mario Cuomo.

== Personal life ==
Curran married Barbara Ann Frank in 1954, and they had seven children. He lived in Manhattan and Spring Lake, New Jersey. He died on September 4, 2008. in Manhattan, of cancer.

New York State Assembly
Preceded by Joseph J. Weiser	Member of the New York Assembly from the New York County 6th district 1963–1965	Constituency abolished
New constituency	Member of the New York Assembly from the 70th district 1966	Succeeded by Jose Ramos-Lopez
Legal offices
Preceded by Whitney North Seymour Jr.	United States Attorney for the Southern District of New York; 1973–1975	Succeeded by Thomas Cahill
