= The Hill (TV series) =

- Starring: Robert Wexler
- Narrated by: Ivy Meeropol
- Country of origin: United States
- Original language: English
- No. of seasons: 1
- No. of episodes: 6

Production
- Running time: 30 minutes
- Production company: Roland Park Pictures

Original release
- Network: Sundance Channel
- Release: August 23, 2006 – 2007

The Hill is a documentary series on the Sundance Channel. In the show Florida Congressman Robert Wexler opens his office doors to the cameras to expose the heated matters facing his constituents today. Directed by filmmaker and former Capitol Hill speechwriter and legislative aide Ivy Meeropol (granddaughter of Ethel and Julius Rosenberg), and produced by Roland Park Pictures, The Hill showcases Wexler’s conflicts both with the opposition and with his own political party on such charged issues as social security, prescription drugs, Medicare, Hurricane Katrina, and the war in Iraq.

Season one premiered on August 23, 2006.
