= Joe Lentol =

American politician

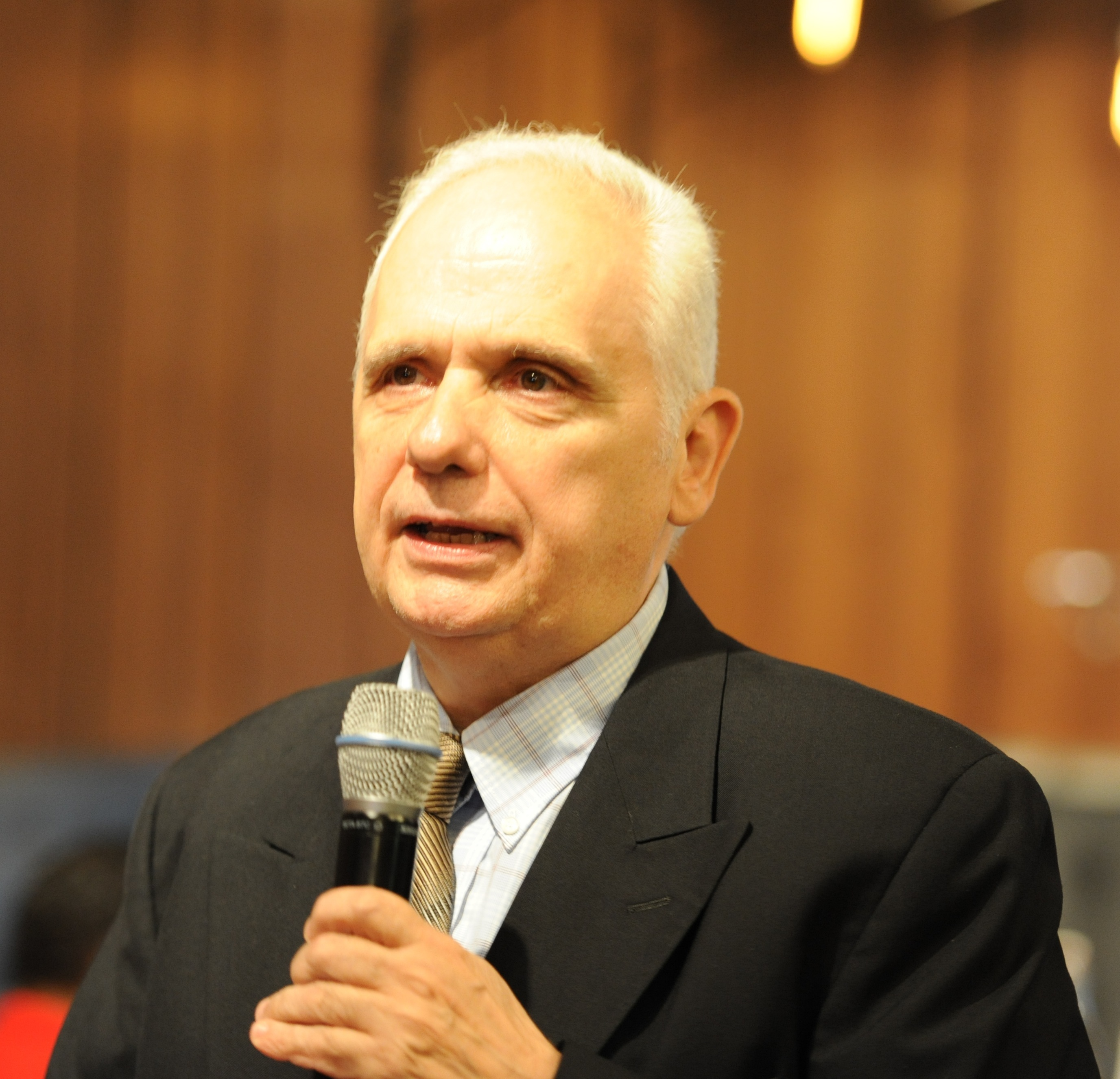

Member of the New York State Assembly from the 50th district
- In office January 3, 1973 – January 1, 2021
- Preceded by: Lucio Russo
- Succeeded by: Emily Gallagher
- Constituency: 58th district (1973–1982); 50th district (1983–2020)

Personal details
- Born: Joseph R. Lentol; January 15, 1943 (age 83) New York City, New York, U.S.
- Party: Democratic
- Education: University of Dayton (BA); University of Baltimore (JD)
- Website: Official website

Joseph R. Lentol (born January 15, 1943) is former representative for District 50 in the New York State Assembly, which comprises Greenpoint, Williamsburg and Fort Greene, among other neighborhoods located in the northern portion of the New York City borough of Brooklyn. He is a Democrat.

== Early life ==
Lentol was born on January 15, 1943, the son of State Senator and Supreme Court Justice Edward S. Lentol (1909–1981).

== New York State Assembly ==
Lentol was first elected to the New York State Assembly in 1972. He has served as Chairman of the Committee on Codes since 1992, and has previously served as Chairman of the Committee on Governmental Employees and the Assembly Committee on Governmental Operations.

In 2000, he was one of two Assembly members chosen by Sheldon Silver and Governor George Pataki to serve on the Election Modernization Task Force. The following year, he was elected by his colleagues to represent the Brooklyn Assembly Delegation and appointed to New York City's Community Action Board, of which he later became chairman.

Prior to his election, Lentol served as an Assistant District Attorney within Kings County.

In 2001, Lentol was elected by his colleagues to direct the Brooklyn Assembly Delegation, responsible for making decisions and advocating for funds and activities for all areas of the borough.

As the Chair of the Assembly Committee on Codes, between 2004 and 2005 Lentol contributed to a report regarding hearings on the death penalty in New York State. He credited the hearings with changing his mind regarding the death penalty which he had in 2004 "wanted to see done right."

=== 2020 Democratic primary defeat ===
On June 23, 2020, Lentol was challenged in the Democratic primary for the first time since 2010. It was the fourth primary of his career. His opponent was community activist Emily Gallagher, who he led by 1,763 votes on election night. However, absentee ballots were more significant than usual due to the COVID-19 pandemic, and once they were counted, Gallagher was determined to have won by between 400 and 600 votes on July 21, 2020. Lentol conceded on July 22, 2020.

New York State Assembly
Preceded by Lucio F. Russo	New York State Assembly; 58th District; 1973–1982	Succeeded by Elizabeth Connelly
Preceded by Florence M. Sullivan	New York State Assembly; 50th District; 1983–2020	Incumbent
