= Christopher J. Mega =

American politician

Christopher J. Mega (November 15, 1930 – October 30, 2011) was an American lawyer and politician from New York.

== Life ==
Mega was born on November 15, 1930, in Borough Park, Brooklyn, New York City. He graduated from Fort Hamilton High School, St. Francis College and Brooklyn Law School.

He entered politics as a Republican. He was a member of the New York State Assembly from 1974 to 1978, sitting in the 180th, 181st and 182nd New York State Legislatures.

He was a member of the New York State Senate from 1979 to 1982, sitting in the 183rd and 184th New York State Legislatures. In November 1982, after re-apportionment, he ran for re-election in the 23rd District, but was defeated by Democrat Joseph G. Montalto. In November 1984, Mega again ran for the State Senate and managed to unseat Montalto. Mega was again a member of the State Senate from 1985 to 1993, sitting in the 186th, 187th, 188th, 189th and 190th New York State Legislatures. Over the years he mostly represented Bay Ridge in Brooklyn as well as Staten Island's East Shore.

Governor Mario Cuomo appointed Mega to the New York Court of Claims in 1993 and in 1995 Governor George Pataki elevated him to chief judge of that court. He served in that capacity until 1998. In 1998, he ran again in the 23rd District for the State Senate, but was defeated by the incumbent Democrat Vincent J. Gentile.

Mega was appointed in June 2000 to the New York Supreme Court.

He died on October 30, 2011, in Saratoga Springs, New York.

New York State Assembly
Preceded by Robert F. Kelly	New York State Assembly; 50th District; 1974–1978	Succeeded by Florence M. Sullivan
New York State Senate
Preceded by William T. Conklin	New York State Senate; 21st District; 1979–1982	Succeeded by Marty Markowitz
Preceded by Joseph G. Montalto	New York State Senate; 23rd District; 1985–1993	Succeeded by Robert DiCarlo
