= Jaiquawn Jarrett =

American football player (born 1989)

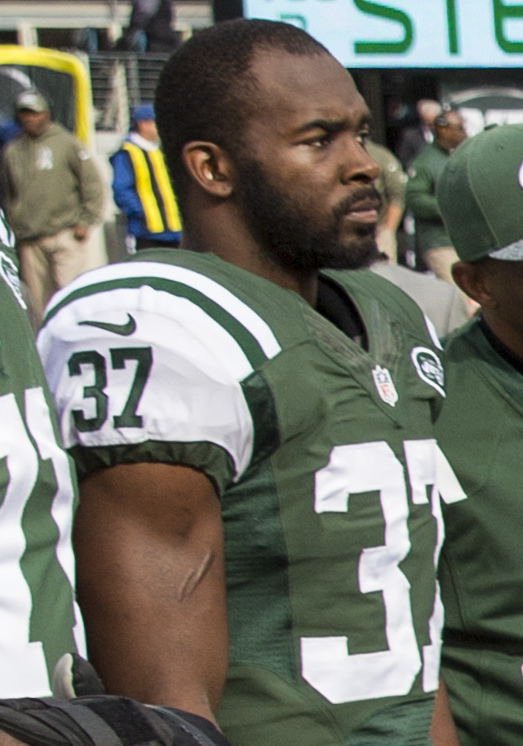
- Jarrett with the New York Jets in 2014

No. 26, 37
- Position: Safety

Personal information
- Born: September 21, 1989 (age 37); Brooklyn, New York, U.S.
- Listed height: 6 ft 0 in (1.83 m)
- Listed weight: 196 lb (89 kg)

Career information
- High school: Fort Hamilton (Brooklyn)
- College: Temple
- NFL draft: 2011: 2nd round, 54th overall pick

Career history
- Philadelphia Eagles (2011–2012); New York Jets (2013–2015)

Awards and highlights
- 2× First-team All-MAC (2009, 2010)

Career NFL statistics
- Total tackles: 83
- Sacks: 1.5
- Forced fumbles: 3
- Fumble recoveries: 1
- Interceptions: 2
- Stats at Pro Football Reference

Jaiquawn Jarrett (born September 21, 1989) is an American former professional football player who was a safety in the National Football League (NFL). He played college football for the Temple Owls and was selected by the Philadelphia Eagles in the second round of the 2011 NFL draft.

== Professional career ==
=== Pre-draft ===
Pre-draft measurables
Height	Weight	Arm length	Hand span	Wingspan	40-yard dash	10-yard split	20-yard split	20-yard shuttle	Three-cone drill	Vertical jump	Broad jump	Bench press
5 ft 11 7/8 in (1.83 m)	198 lb (90 kg)	32 1/4 in (0.82 m)	10 in (0.25 m)	6 ft 3 3/4 in (1.92 m)	4.69 s	1.58 s	2.69 s	4.14 s	6.95 s	30.5 in (0.77 m)	9 ft 5 in (2.87 m)	17 reps
All values from 2011 NFL Scouting Combine/Pro Day

Jarrett was projected to be drafted in the third or fourth round of the 2011 NFL draft.

=== Philadelphia Eagles ===
Jarrett was selected by the Philadelphia Eagles in the second round (54th overall) of the 2011 NFL draft. He was signed to a four-year contract on July 27, 2011. Jarrett was released by the Philadelphia Eagles on September 11, 2012.

=== New York Jets ===
Jarrett signed a future/reserve contract with the New York Jets on December 31, 2012. Jarrett entered the 2013 preseason competing with Antonio Allen for the starting free safety job. Jarret had his breakout performance against the Steelers in 2014, earning 2 interceptions, 10 tackles, a sack, and a fumble recovery.

On April 24, 2015, Jarrett signed the one-year, restricted free agent tender to stay with the Jets. He was waived/injured by the Jets on October 24. After clearing waivers, the Jets placed him on injured reserve three days later.
