= Rees Edgar Tulloss =

7th President of Wittenberg University
- In office 1920–1949
- Preceded by: Charles G. Heckert
- Succeeded by: Charence Charles Stoughton

Personal details
- Education: Johns Hopkins University (BA); Harvard University (Phd)

Rees Edgar Tulloss was the 7th President of Wittenberg University.
