= Jon Gnagy =

American television art instructor

- Born: January 13, 1907; Pretty Prairie, Kansas, US
- Died: March 7, 1981 (aged 74); Idyllwild, California, US
- Occupations: artist, teacher, TV personality, author
- Known for: pioneering 1940s TV show teaching drawing and art
- Spouse: Mary Jo Hinton Gnagy
- Children: 2

Jon Gnagy (January 13, 1907 – March 7, 1981) was a self-taught artist most remembered for being America's original television art instructor, hosting You Are an Artist, which began on the NBC network and included analysis of paintings from the Museum of Modern Art, and his later syndicated Learn to Draw series.

As of 1986, over fifteen million of Gnagy's drawing kits had been sold.

The Philadelphia-based Martin F. Weber Company still manufactures Gnagy's drawing kits.

Gnagy also worked on book illustrations including The Coit Fishing Pole Club Beginner's Book of Fishing and The Nature of Things.

== Life and career ==
According to his 1947 instruction book, his TV program You Are an Artist "had at this writing by far the longest run of any program emanating from the NBC television studios." His biography, published in the catalogue of An Exhibition of Paintings and Litho-Drawings (Idyllwild, California, 1964), told of his early life:

Jon Gnagy, known to millions as America's television art teacher, was born at Varner's Forge, an outpost settlement near Pretty Prairie, Kansas, in 1907. The pioneer environment of his first seven years at the Forge and family farm reflect a strong influence in his work as an artist. Son of Hungarian-Swiss Mennonites, Jon early developed inventive skills common to rural craftsmen. At the age of eleven he began drawing and painting without instruction, winning sweepstake prizes at the Kansas State Fair in Hutchinson when he was 13 years old. Gaining attention each year at the State Fair as the self-taught "blacksmith" of art, his vigorous compositions of the American Scene brought him an offer from Tulsa, Oklahoma. When he was seventeen he accepted the position of art director with an industrial public relations organization in the Oil Capital, where he produced posters for the International Petroleum Exposition... Gnagy became well prepared for his role as one of the country's greatest audio-visual educators when television started beaming to the public on May 13th, 1946. His was the first performer on the first show the day the updated Channel 4 antenna (replacing NBC's old channel one antenna) was completed atop the Empire State Building. Since then the grassroots blacksmith's name has become a household friend to millions of people.

During the early part of World War II, Gnagy taught camouflage techniques at the Franklin Institute in Philadelphia.

On May 13, 1946, Jon Gnagy was the first "act" on the first television program broadcast from the new WNBT channel 4 antenna atop the Empire State Building. Gnagy pioneered drawing on television in the United States from the early 1950s throughout the 1960s on his program, Learn to Draw, and his popular art kits are still available.

His son-in-law, Thaddeus Seymour, was president of Rollins College from 1978 to 1990.

== Legacy ==
Author and illustrator Richard Egielski, in the October 2011 issue of BookPage, described Gnagy as his childhood hero, writing, "I drew along with him every week."

== Selected books ==
- Gnagy, Jon, You are an artist; an easy quick method which has proved that anyone can draw. Drawing lessons for beginners., Garden City, N.Y. : Doubleday, 1947
- Gnagy, Jon, New Television Art Instruction Book, Garden City, N.Y. : Doubleday, 1950
- Gnagy, Jon, "Learn to Draw with Jon Gnagy": Arthur Brown & Bro., INC, NY 1950
