= New York's 50th State Assembly district =

American legislative district

Assemblymember
Emily Gallagher; D–Greenpoint

New York's 50th State Assembly district is one of the 150 districts in the New York State Assembly. It has been represented by Emily Gallagher since 2021. She defeated then 48-year Assemblyman Joe Lentol in the 2020 Democratic primary.

== Geography ==
=== 2020s ===
District 50 is in Brooklyn. It contains Greenpoint and parts of Williamsburg.

The district is entirely contained within New York's 7th congressional district, and overlaps the 18th and 59th districts of the New York State Senate, and the 33rd and 34th districts of the New York City Council.

=== 2010s ===
District 50 is in Brooklyn. It contains parts of Greenpoint, Clinton Hill, Williamsburg and Fort Greene. The Brooklyn Navy Yard is located within this district.

== Recent election results ==
=== 2026 ===
2026 New York State Assembly election, District 50
Primary election
Party	Candidate	Votes	%
Democratic	Emily Gallagher (incumbent)	11,680	85.4
Democratic	Andrew Bodiford	1,720	12.6
Write-in		285	2.0
Total votes		13,685	100.0
General election
Democratic	Emily Gallagher (incumbent)		
Write-in			
Total votes			100.0

=== 2024 ===
2024 New York State Assembly election, District 50
Primary election
Party	Candidate	Votes	%
Democratic	Emily Gallagher (incumbent)	4,652	75.0
Democratic	Anathea Simpkins	1,295	20.9
Democratic	Andrew Bodiford	228	3.7
Write-in		28	0.4
Total votes		6,203	100
General election
Democratic	Emily Gallagher	29,622	
Working Families	Emily Gallagher	6,976	
Total	Emily Gallagher (incumbent)	36,598	98.0
Write-in		749	2.0
Total votes		37,347	100.0

=== 2022 ===
2022 New York State Assembly election, District 50
Primary election
Party	Candidate	Votes	%
Democratic	Emily Gallagher (incumbent)	6,634	79.5
Democratic	Paddy O'Sullivan	1,672	20.0
Write-in		37	0.4
Total votes		8,343	100.0
General election
Democratic	Emily Gallagher	20,724	
Working Families	Emily Gallagher	6,321	
Total	Emily Gallagher (incumbent)	27,045	97.7
Write-in		636	2.3
Total votes		27,681	100.0
Democratic hold			

=== 2020 ===
2020 New York State Assembly election, District 50
Primary election
Party	Candidate	Votes	%
Democratic	Emily Gallagher	10,386	52.7
Democratic	Joe Lentol (incumbent)	9,235	46.9
Write-in		87	0.4
Total votes		19,708	100.0
General election
Democratic	Emily Gallagher	38,278	97.0
Write-in		1,177	3.0
Total votes		39,455	100.0
Democratic hold			

=== 2018 ===
2018 New York State Assembly election, District 50
Party	Candidate	Votes	%
Democratic	Joe Lentol (incumbent)	29,147	99.2
Write-in		238	0.8
Total votes		29,385	100
Democratic hold			

=== 2016 ===
2016 New York State Assembly election, District 50
Party	Candidate	Votes	%
Democratic	Joe Lentol (incumbent)	33,290	99.3
Write-in		237	0.7
Total votes		33,527	100
Democratic hold			

=== 2014 ===
2014 New York State Assembly election, District 50
Party	Candidate	Votes	%
Democratic	Joe Lentol (incumbent)	9,789	89.7
Republican	William Davidson Jr.	1,089	10.0
Write-in		35	0.3
Total votes		10,913	100
Democratic hold			

=== 2012 ===
2012 New York State Assembly election, District 50
Party	Candidate	Votes	%
Democratic	Joe Lentol (incumbent)	25,561	89.6
Republican	Victor Best	2,522	
Conservative	Victor Best	403	
Total	Victor Best	2,925	10.2
Write-in		52	0.2
Total votes		28,538	100
Democratic win (new boundaries)			

=== 2010 ===
2010 New York State Assembly election, District 50
Primary election
Party	Candidate	Votes	%
Democratic	Joe Lentol (incumbent)	5,952	80.7
Democratic	Andre Soleil	1,404	19.0
Write-in		20	0.3
Total votes		7,376	100.0
General election
Democratic	Joe Lentol (incumbent)	15,728	88.1
Republican	Jacqueline Haro	1,789	
Conservative	Jacqueline Haro	311	
Total	Jacqueline Haro	2,100	11.8
Write-in		17	0.1
Total votes		17,845	100.0
Democratic hold			

=== 2008 ===
2008 New York State Assembly election, District 50
Party	Candidate	Votes	%
Democratic	Joe Lentol (incumbent)	24,538	89.9
Republican	Teresa Puccio	2,490	
Conservative	Teresa Puccio	252	
Total	Teresa Puccio	2,742	10.1
Write-in		0	0.0
Total votes		27,280	100.0
Democratic hold			

=== 2006 ===
2006 New York State Assembly election, District 50
Party	Candidate	Votes	%
Democratic	Joe Lentol (incumbent)	11,148	89.4
Republican	Richard Trainer	1,127	
Conservative	Richard Trainer	199	
Total	Richard Trainer	1,326	10.6
Write-in		0	0.0
Total votes		12,474	100.0
Democratic hold			

=== 2004 ===
2004 New York State Assembly election, District 50
Party	Candidate	Votes	%
Democratic	Joe Lentol (incumbent)	20,877	87.6
Republican	Richard Trainer	2,700	
Conservative	Richard Trainer	262	
Total	Richard Trainer	2,962	12.4
Write-in		0	0.0
Total votes		23,839	100.0
Democratic hold			

=== 2002 ===
2002 New York State Assembly election, District 50
Party	Candidate	Votes	%
Democratic	Joe Lentol (incumbent)	11,216	96.8
Conservative	Walter Wrubel	370	3.2
Write-in		0	0.0
Total votes		11,586	100.0
Democratic win (new boundaries)			

=== 2000 ===
2000 New York State Assembly election, District 50
Party	Candidate	Votes	%
Democratic	Joe Lentol (incumbent)	13,456	81.1
Republican	Stella Harmatiuk	1,757	
Conservative	Stella Harmatiuk	150	
Total	Stella Harmatiuk	1,907	11.5
Green	Javier Enriquez	1,221	7.4
Write-in		0	0.0
Total votes		16,584	100.0
Democratic hold			

=== Federal results in Assembly District 50 ===
Year	Office	Results
2024	President	Harris 73.4 - 24.4%
2024	Senate	Gillibrand 79.0 - 20.0%
2022	Senate	Schumer 80.0 - 19.3%
2020	President	Biden 73.7 - 25.1%
2018	Senate	Gillibrand 90.9 - 8.9%
2016	President	Clinton 82.9 - 13.0%
2016	Senate	Schumer 85.3 - 9.3%
2012	President	Obama 81.2 - 16.3%
2012	Senate	Gillibrand 86.5 - 10.3%
