= Whitney North Seymour =

American lawyer

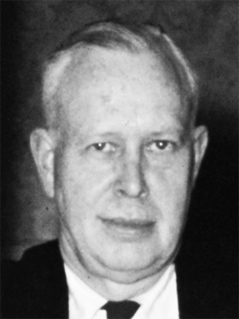
- Born: January 4, 1901; Chicago, Illinois, U.S.
- Died: May 21, 1983 (aged 82); New York City, U.S.
- Education: University of Wisconsin–Madison; Columbia Law School
- Occupation: Attorney
- Employer: Simpson Thacher & Bartlett
- Spouse: Lola Vickers (m. 1922)
- Children: Whitney Jr.; Thaddeus

Whitney North Seymour Sr. (January 4, 1901 – May 21, 1983) was an American attorney who worked primarily as a trial lawyer. He served as assistant solicitor general during the presidency of Herbert Hoover. In 1960, he was elected the 84th president of the American Bar Association. Seymour served for many years as the managing partner of the law firm Simpson Thacher & Bartlett.

== Biography ==
Seymour was born on January 4, 1901, in Chicago, the son of Charles Walton Seymour, a prominent lecturer and educator, and Margaret Lucinda Rugg. He married Lola Virginia Vickers in New York in 1922, and they had two sons, Whitney Jr. and Thaddeus.

He was an assistant solicitor general in the United States Justice Department from 1931 to 1933 before returning to Simpson Thacher & Bartlett. Seymour also taught law at Yale Law School, served as president of the American Arbitration Association and was chairman of the Carnegie Endowment for International Peace and of Freedom House. He served as president of the Legal Aid Society, the New York City Bar Association, and the American College of Trial Lawyers. He was particularly active in organizations dedicated to historic preservation, and he was an active member of Grace Church in Greenwich Village, where he led the committee which saved the James Renwick designed facade of the Grace Church School.

Seymour, who grew up in Madison, Wisconsin completed his undergraduate studies at the University of Wisconsin. He graduated with a B.A. in 1919 and received an honorary L.L.D. in 1962. He attended Columbia Law School from which he received his law degree in 1923 and an honorary L.L.D. in 1960.

In his practice, he specialized in trial work and appellate litigation. He argued more than fifty cases before the United States Supreme Court. Seymour was considered an expert on antitrust law and civil liberties. He was committed to issues of civil rights and served on the board of the American Civil Liberties Union. Seymour defended a young black communist, Angelo Herndon, convicted in the 1930s of violating Georgia's anti-insurrection law largely because he had communist literature in his room. He won an appeal in the U.S. Supreme Court.

He died in New York City on May 21, 1983.

His son, Whitney North Seymour Jr., was a New York State Senator in the 1960s and the United States Attorney for the Southern District of New York from 1970 to 1973.

His other son, Thaddeus Seymour, was Dean of Dartmouth College, President of Wabash College and President of Rollins College.
