= T. Norman Mansell =

American architect

Thomas Norman Mansell
- Born: May 16, 1904; Morrisville, Pennsylvania
- Died: 1991
- Other names: T. Norman Mansell
- Occupation: Architect
- Known for: Principal in T. Norman Mansell and partner in Mansell, Lewis & Fugate

Thomas Norman Mansell, FAIA, (May 16, 1904 – 1991), was an American architect based in Pennsylvania who practiced in the mid-twentieth-century in Delaware, Delaware, Georgia, Kentucky, Maryland, Michigan, Minnesota, New Jersey, New York, North Carolina, Ohio, Pennsylvania, South Carolina, and Virginia under his own name as T. Norman Mansell from 1938 to 1955 and partner in the architectural firm name of Mansell, Lewis & Fugate from 1955 to 1969.

== Early life and education ==
Born on May 16, 1904, in Morrisville, Pennsylvania, Mansell earned his Bachelor of Architecture from the University of Pennsylvania in 1926, graduating summa cum laude. He won the Arthur Spayd Brook Prize Medal and the Faculty Medal for excellence in design in 1926. He was awarded an honorary F.A.D from Wittenberg University in 1956. In 1970, he lived on 143 Powell Road, Springfield, Pennsylvania, 19064.

== Architectural career ==
Mansell joined the Philadelphia Chapter of the American Institute of Architects, in 1942. He was elected a Fellows of the American Institute of Architects in 1968 and was also awarded a NCARB Certificate. He practiced under his own name, T. Norman Mansell, from 1938 to 1955. With Richard Arnold Lewis and Edwin Lindsay Fugate, Thomas Norman Mansell established Mansell, Lewis & Fugate in 1955 and disbanded the partnership in 1969. The firm's address was 300 E. Lancaster Avenue Wynnewood, Pennsylvania 19096. In 1970, he was registered to practice in Delaware, Delaware, Georgia, Kentucky, Maryland, Michigan, Minnesota, New Jersey, New York, North Carolina, Ohio, Pennsylvania, South Carolina, and Virginia. He was the president of Darby Lions Club, Pennsylvania, from 1932 to 1933, president of the Springfield Zoning Hearing Board from 1946 to 1970, president of the Philadelphia Sketch Club from 1963 to 1964, president of Delaware County Tuberculosis & Health Association, Pennsylvania, from 1970 to 1971. He was president of the Philadelphia Chapter of the American Institute of Architects in 1961 and 1966, the 1st vice president in 1965, and director in and 1961, 1968–1970. He was the director of the Pennsylvania Society of Architects from 1968 to 1970.

== Awards and publications ==
He was awarded the excellence in design award for his Wittenberg University Chapel by the Guild Religious Architecture in 1957. He was published in various periodicals, and "For Church Builders—A Recall to Basics & Introduction: Church Lighting."

== Works as Mansell, Lewis & Fugate ==
- 1956: Wittenberg University Weaver Chapel
- 1956: Wittenberg UniversityLibrary
- 1958: St. Peter's Lutheran Church (Miami, Florida)
- 1960: Leeds & Northrup Research & Development Laboratory (North Wales, Pennsylvania)
- 1960: LCA Publication House Office Building (Philadelphia, Pennsylvania) Research & Development Laboratory (North Wales, Pennsylvania)
- 1960: Resurrection Evangelical Lutheran Church, Arlington, Virginia (as MANSELL, McGETTIGAN, FUGATE & RAPP) (p. 69)
- 1968: Leeds & Northrup Company Engineering Center (North Wales, Pennsylvania)
