= Robert DiCarlo =

American politician (born 1957)

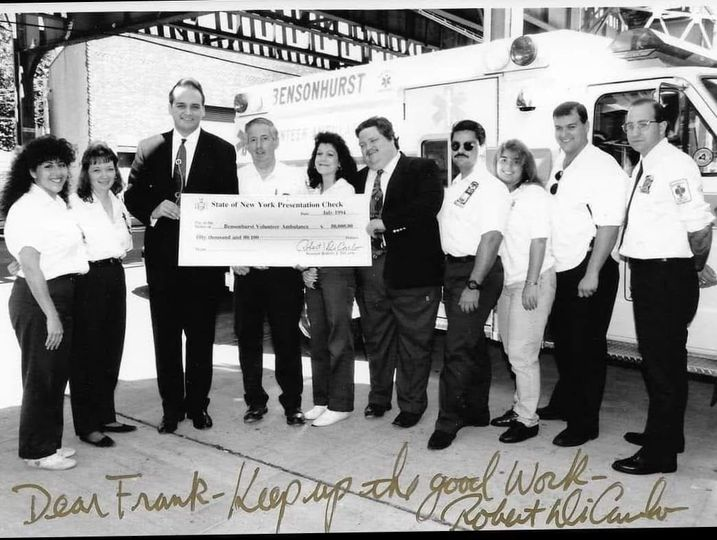
Robert DiCarlo presenting check to the Bensonhurst Volunteer Ambulance Service

Robert J. DiCarlo (born February 21, 1957) is a former Republican Party lawmaker from Brooklyn, New York who served in the New York State Senate from 1993 to 1996, representing parts of Bay Ridge and Bensonhurst in Brooklyn as well as Staten Island's East Shore.

He is the son of former New York State Assemblyman Dominick DiCarlo.

In 2007 he ran unsuccessfully for Brookhaven, New York Supervisor.

New York State Senate
Preceded by Christopher Mega	New York State Senate, 23rd District; 1993–1996	Succeeded by Vincent J. Gentile
Party political offices
Preceded by Christopher Mega	Conservative Party of New York nominee for New York State Senate, 23rd District; 2000	Succeeded by Seymour P. Lachman
Preceded by Christopher Mega	Republican nominee for New York State Senate, 23rd District; 2000	Succeeded by Alfred B. Curtis, Jr.
Preceded by Christopher Mega	New York State Right to Life Party nominee for New York State Senate, 23rd District; 2000	Succeeded by No Nominees Since 2000
Preceded by John Jay LaValle	Republican nominee for Town of Brookhaven, Supervisor; 2007	Succeeded by Timothy Mazzei
