= Risk/Reward =

- Directed by: Elizabeth Holder; Xan Parker
- Produced by: Elizabeth Holder; Xan Parker
- Starring: Louise Jones; Carol Warner Wilke; Kimberley Euston; Umber Ahmad
- Cinematography: Cynthia Wade
- Edited by: Rachel Kittner
- Music by: Mj Mynarski
- Distributed by: Organic Pictures; Roland Park Pictures
- Release date: 2003
- Running time: 88 minutes
- Country: United States
- Language: English

Risk/Reward is a 2003 documentary film about women on Wall Street. It follows the lives of four Wall Street women: a research analyst, a currency trader, an NYSE floor broker and a rookie investment banker. It was directed by Elizabeth Holder and Xan Parker and produced by Roland Park Pictures.

The documentary features Louise Jones, Carol Warner Wilke, Kimberley Euston, and Umber Ahmad, and includes appearances by Roslyn Dickerson, Muriel Siebert, Ann Kaplan, Janet Tiebout Hanson, Sheila Wellington and Maria Bartiromo. Risk/Reward was released theatrically in New York City and Chicago and was televised on Oxygen Media.

== Accolades ==
The film was an official selection of: Tribeca Film Festival, Hot Docs International Documentary Film Festival, Full Frame Documentary Film Festival, Maryland Film Festival, Starz Denver Film Festival, Philadelphia Film Festival, Rhode Island Film Festival, Central Standard Film Festival, Rocky Mountain Women's Film Festival, Northampton Film Festival.

== Awards ==
- Sarasota Film Festival ("Best of the Fest")
- Baltimore Magazine August 2003 ("Best Documentary")
