= Thaddeus Seymour =

American academic (1928–2019)

Thaddeus Seymour (June 29, 1928 – October 26, 2019) was an American academician. Seymour was born in New York City. His father, Whitney North Seymour was president of the American Bar Association. Seymour went to Princeton University and the University of California, Berkeley, and studied English literature at the University of North Carolina, where he received his master's degree and doctoral degrees. He was an English professor at Dartmouth College and later dean at Dartmouth. From 1969 to 1978 he was president of Wabash College, and from 1978 to 1990 he was president of Rollins College.

During his time at Rollins, he returned the focus of the college to its roots as a liberal-arts college, raised faculty salaries, built a new college library and a dedicated classroom building for the liberal arts. He also moved to solidify the college's financial footing.

John Phillips, president of the National Association of Independent Colleges and Universities praised Seymour's work at Rollins. According to Keith Henderson of The Christian Science Monitor

What Seymour has accomplished in his eight years here is "pretty remarkable," according to John Phillips, president of the National Association of Independent Colleges and Universities. "He's gone against the trends." When others have been willing to say, "whatever people want, let's provide it," Seymour has never veered from his purpose – the establishment, as Dr. Phillips puts it, of "a high-quality liberal arts institution in a place that's associated in the public's mind with Disney World and fun in the sun."

Seymour was the son-in-law of celebrated illustration instructor Jon Gnagy, who hosted TV series in the 1950s and '60s. Seymour died in his home in Winter Park, Florida, on October 26, 2019, at age 91.
