= Muriel Siebert =

American businesswoman

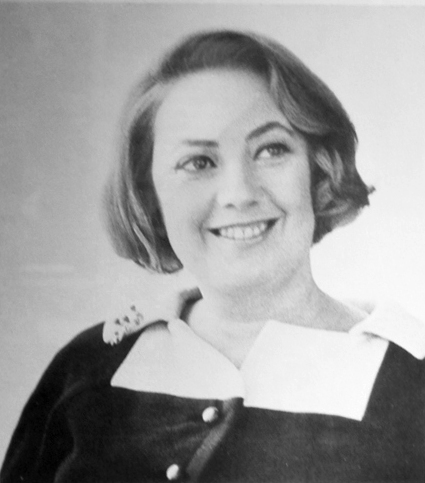
- Siebert in an advertisement
- Born: September 12, 1928; Cleveland, Ohio, U.S.
- Died: August 24, 2013 (aged 84); New York City, New York, U.S.
- Other name: Mickie Siebert
- Known for: First woman to own a seat on the NYSE

Muriel Faye Siebert (September 12, 1928 – August 24, 2013) was an American businesswoman who was the first woman to own a seat on the New York Stock Exchange (NYSE), and the first woman to head one of the NYSE's member firms. She joined the 1,365 male members of the exchange on December 28, 1967. Siebert is sometimes known as the "first woman of finance", despite being preceded in owning a brokerage by Victoria Woodhull.

== Biography ==
Siebert was born to a Jewish family in Cleveland, Ohio. Siebert began her career working at various brokerages. In 1967, she founded her own eponymous firm, Muriel Siebert & Co., Inc., beginning by doing research for institutions, and buying and selling financial analyses. That same year, she applied for a seat on the NYSE. Of the first ten investors she asked to sponsor her application, nine refused her.

The NYSE itself insisted on a new condition before considering Siebert's application. It insisted that Siebert obtain a letter from a bank offering loans of $300,000 at the near-record $445,000 seat price. But banks would not commit to lending her the money until the NYSE would agree to admit her. Siebert finally was elected to membership on December 28, 1967. In 1975, when the Securities and Exchange Commission first permitted broker commissions to be negotiable, she criticized the discount brokers vehemently; she ran numerous ads calling the discounters and the rates "low ball". In 1977, she was named Superintendent of Banks for the State of New York, with oversight of all of the banks in the state, regulating about $500 billion. Not one bank failed during her tenure, despite failures nationwide. When she learned Hugh Carey, New York Governor at the time, had appointed her to the position, Siebert recalled thinking, "Mickie, you know you're a college dropout. You've done pretty well as a college dropout!"

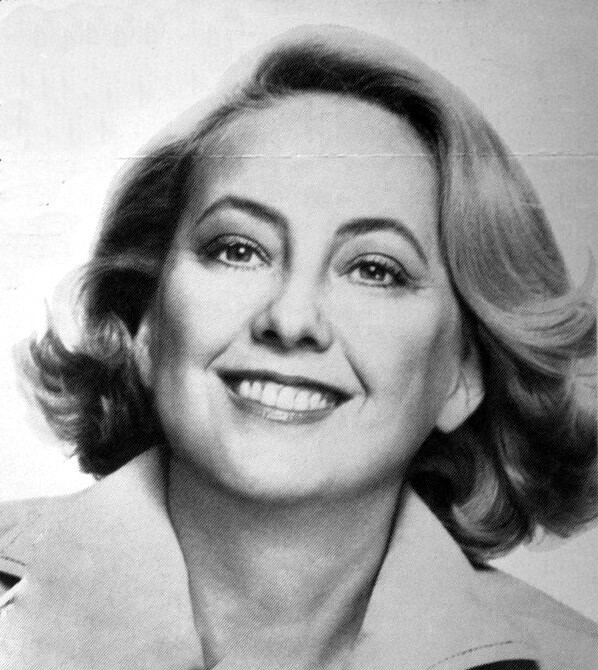
A 1970s advertisement

Shortly after returning to her firm, she ran in the Republican primary for the Senate seat of Daniel Patrick Moynihan. She finished second behind State Assemblywoman Florence M. Sullivan, who went on to lose to Moynihan in November 1982. In the mid-1990s, Siebert & Co. reverse merged with a furniture holding company, J. Michael & Sons, that was liquidating, thereby, becoming a publicly traded company. Siebert remained President of her eponymous firm and continued to be a sought after commentator on phenomena in financial markets. She was interviewed in the 2003 documentary Risk/Reward.

== Advocacy and philanthropies ==
Siebert was an outspoken advocate for women and minorities in the industry. She was quoted as saying, "American business will find that women executives can be a strong competitive weapon against Japan and Germany and other countries that still limit their executive talent pool to the male 50 percent of their population," as well as "men at the top of industry and government should be more willing to risk sharing leadership with women and minority members who are not merely clones of their white male buddies. In these fast-changing times, we need the different viewpoints and experiences, we need the enlarged talent bank. The real risk lies in continuing to do things the way they've always been done."

In 1990, she created the Siebert Entrepreneurial Philanthropic Plan, through which she shared half of her firm's profits from new securities underwriting with charities of the issuers' choices. The program offers buyers of new securities a chance to help charities in their communities. Through 2006, more than $5 million has been contributed through this program. She served as president of the New York Women's Agenda (NYWA) in 1998. During her term, NYWA developed a program advocating "Financial Literacy for Women", which continued until her death.

She sat on the boards of several philanthropies including The Economic Club of New York, The New York State Business Council, the Greater New York Council of the Boy Scouts of America, and the Guild Hall Museum, and others.

== Honors ==
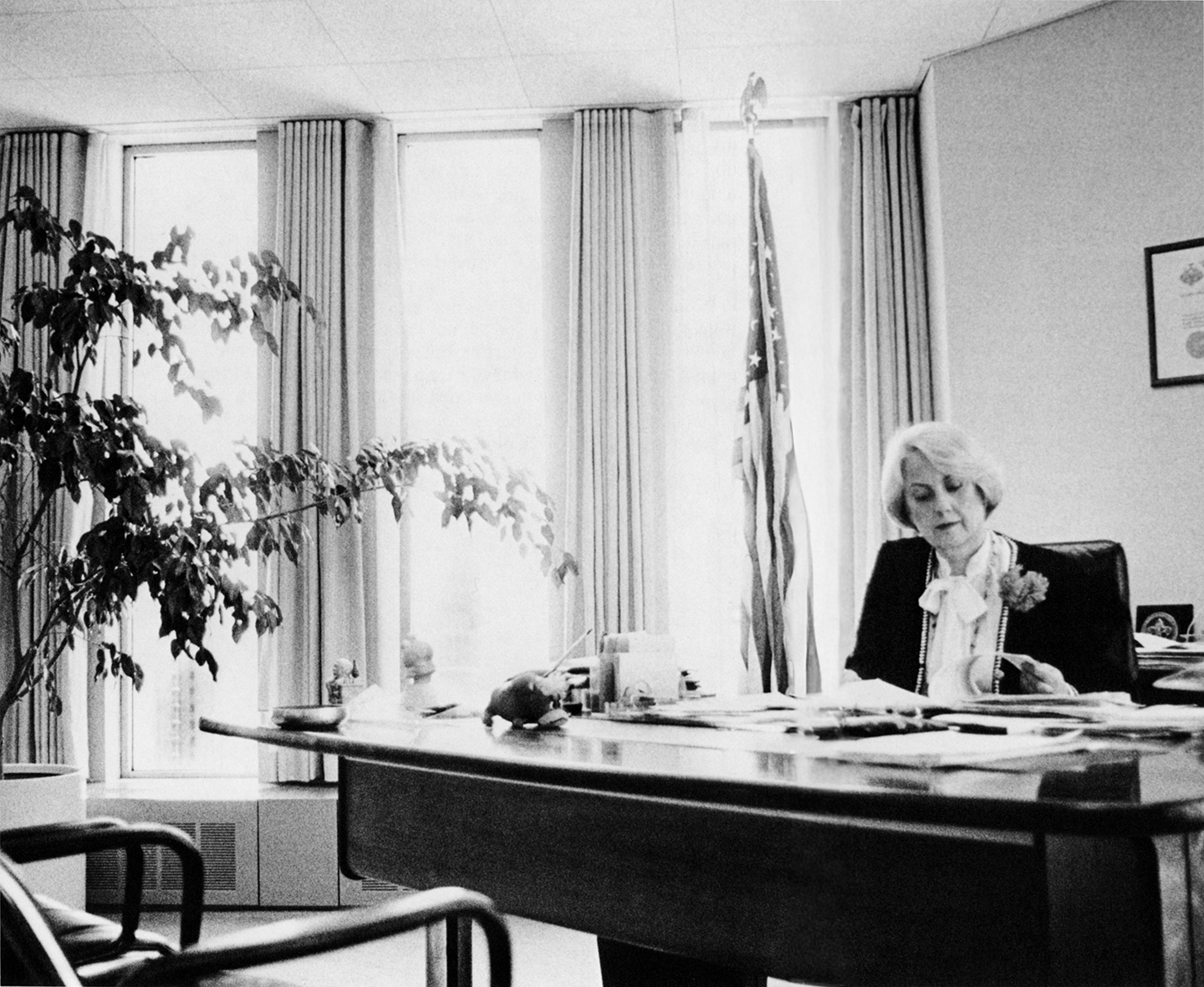
Muriel Siebert photographed by Lynn Gilbert

In 1969, Siebert received the Golden Plate Award of the American Academy of Achievement.

From 1981–1983, Bonnie Tiburzi put on three "Women of Accomplishment" luncheons for the Wings Club honoring certain women, including Siebert.

In honor of Siebert's 30th anniversary on the NYSE, she rang the closing bell on January 5, 1998. Likewise, on December 28, 2007, exactly 40 years after her election to the membership of the New York Stock Exchange, she rang the closing bell in celebration.

In 1994, Siebert was inducted into the National Women's Hall of Fame.

In 2009, she was inducted into the Junior Achievement U.S. Business Hall of Fame.

She received honorary degrees from Wagner College, the University of Rochester, Case Western Reserve University, Manhattan College, and the University of North Carolina at Asheville.

In 2016, Siebert Hall at the NYSE was dedicated in honor of her; this was the first time a room at the NYSE was named after an individual.

== Personal ==
Siebert was born in Cleveland, Ohio on September 12, 1928. She attended Western Reserve University (now Case Western Reserve University) from 1949 to 1952, but left without graduating when her father fell ill. She never married or had children.

== Death ==
On August 24, 2013, Siebert died, aged 84, from complications from cancer at Memorial Sloan-Kettering Cancer Center. She is survived by her sister, Elaine Siebert.
