= Staten Island Greenbelt =

Public park in Staten Island, New York, United States

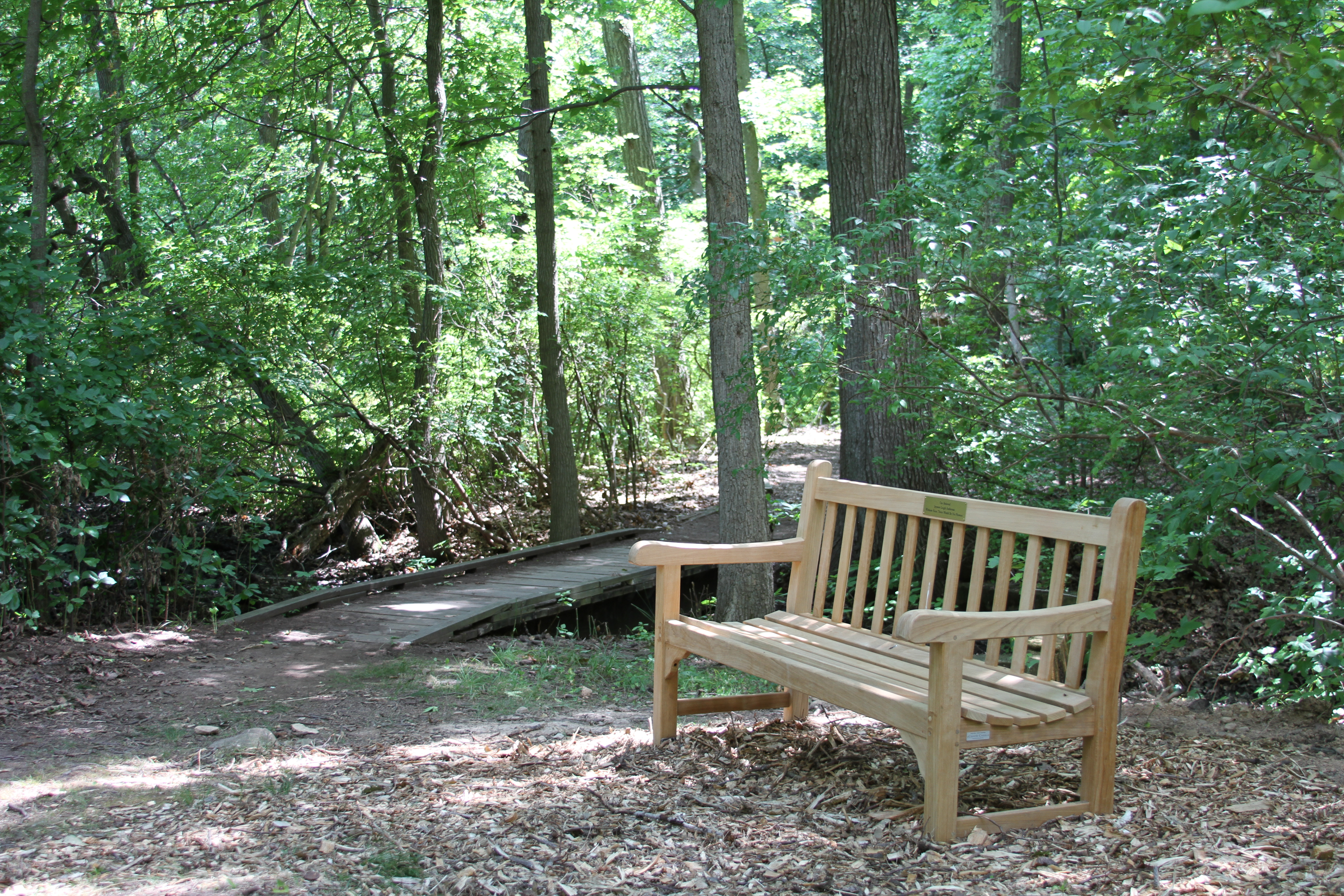
- At Manor Road
- Interactive map of Staten Island Greenbelt
- Type: Urban park
- Location: Staten Island, New York City, United States
- Coordinates: 40.58846°N 74.139073°W
- Area: 2,800 acres (11 km^{2})
- Created: 1984
- Owner: NYC Parks
- Operator: Greenbelt Conservancy
- Status: Open all year
- Website: www.sigreenbelt.org

The Staten Island Greenbelt is a system of contiguous public parkland and natural areas in the central hills of the New York City borough of Staten Island. It is the second largest component of the parks owned by the government of New York City and is maintained by the city's Department of Parks and Recreation and the Greenbelt Conservancy, a not-for-profit organization that works in partnership with NYC Parks to care for the Greenbelt and raise funds for its maintenance and programs. The Greenbelt includes High Rock Park, LaTourette Park, William T. Davis Wildlife Refuge, and Willowbrook Park among others.

== Description ==
The administrative headquarters of the Greenbelt and Greenbelt Conservancy are located at the entrance to High Rock Park (one of the many parks within the system) with a street address of 200 Nevada Avenue in the Egbertville neighborhood; in June 2004 a second facility, known as the Greenbelt Nature Center, was opened approximately 0.75 miles (1.21 km) away, at 700 Rockland Avenue. The Greenbelt Conservancy, which works in partnership with the NYC Parks Department, is a membership organization offering year-round nature-themed events for people of all ages.

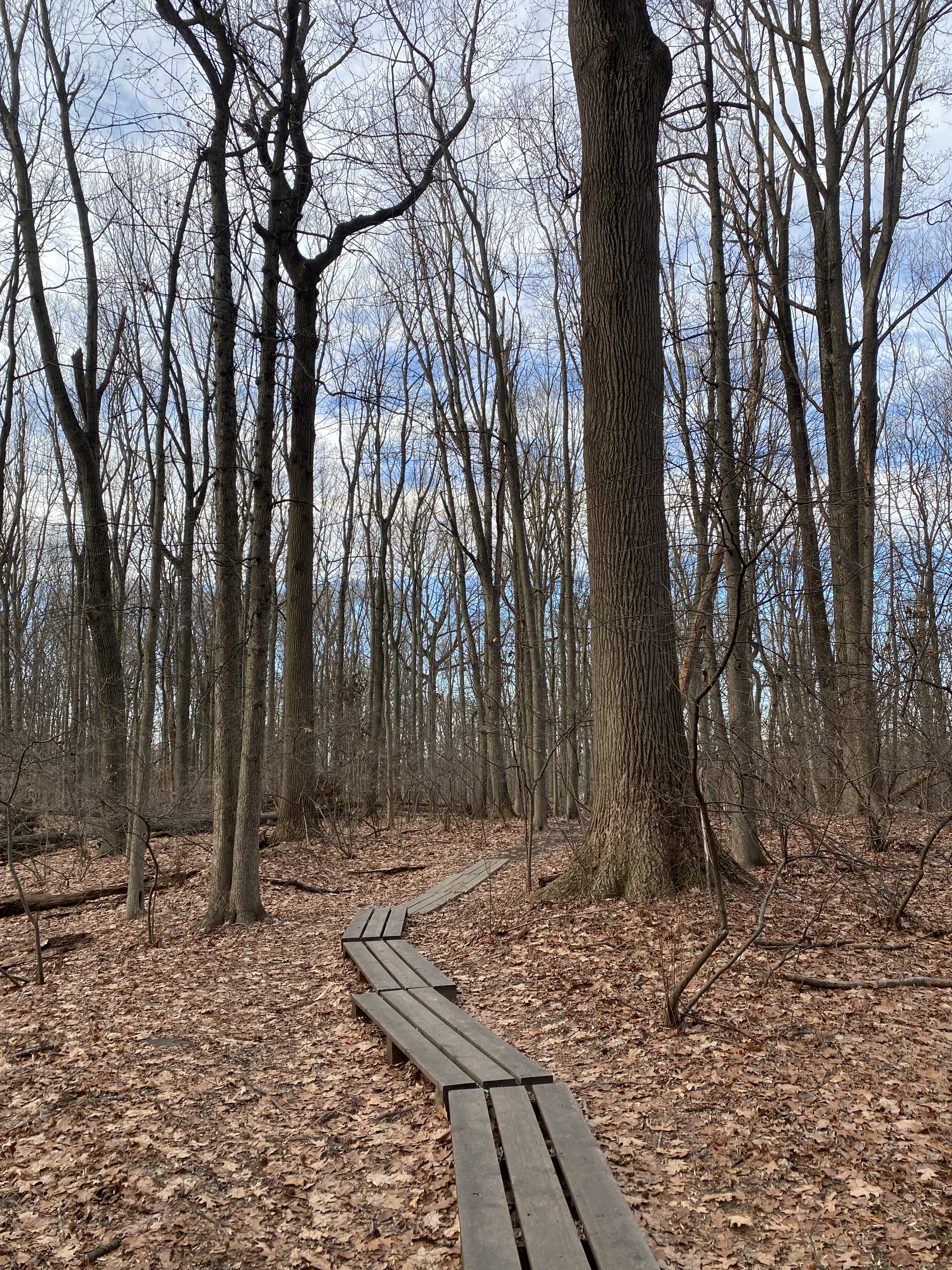
Trail in Staten Island Greenbelt, 2025

The Protectors of Pine Oak Woods, a citizen organization committed to the conservation and preservation of remaining natural area on Staten Island has, since the early 1970s, carried on the mission of its predecessor, SIGNAL. Today the "Protectors" continue the tradition of organizing people concerned about the island's fragile and threatened wilderness via lobbying and naturalist led hikes.

A researchable archive of planning, legal, public relations, and other documents related to the Staten Island Greenbelt, its ecology and history, is housed at the library of the College of Staten Island, a campus of the City University of New York.

=== Geology ===
Containing an extensive system of connected trails and covering 2,800 acres (1,100 ha), its forested hills run the length of Staten Island's midsection while wetlands and kettle ponds fill much of the low-lying areas. Four hundred and ten feet above sea level, Todt Hill is the highest elevation south of Maine along the Eastern Seaboard. This and other surface features are the result of glacial activity from the Pleistocene epoch; the metamorphic and igneous rocks below the surface – schist, sandstone, serpentine, magnetite, iron oxide – are the result of tectonic activity from the much earlier Paleozoic era and volcanic activity from subsequent geologic eras.

=== Wildlife ===
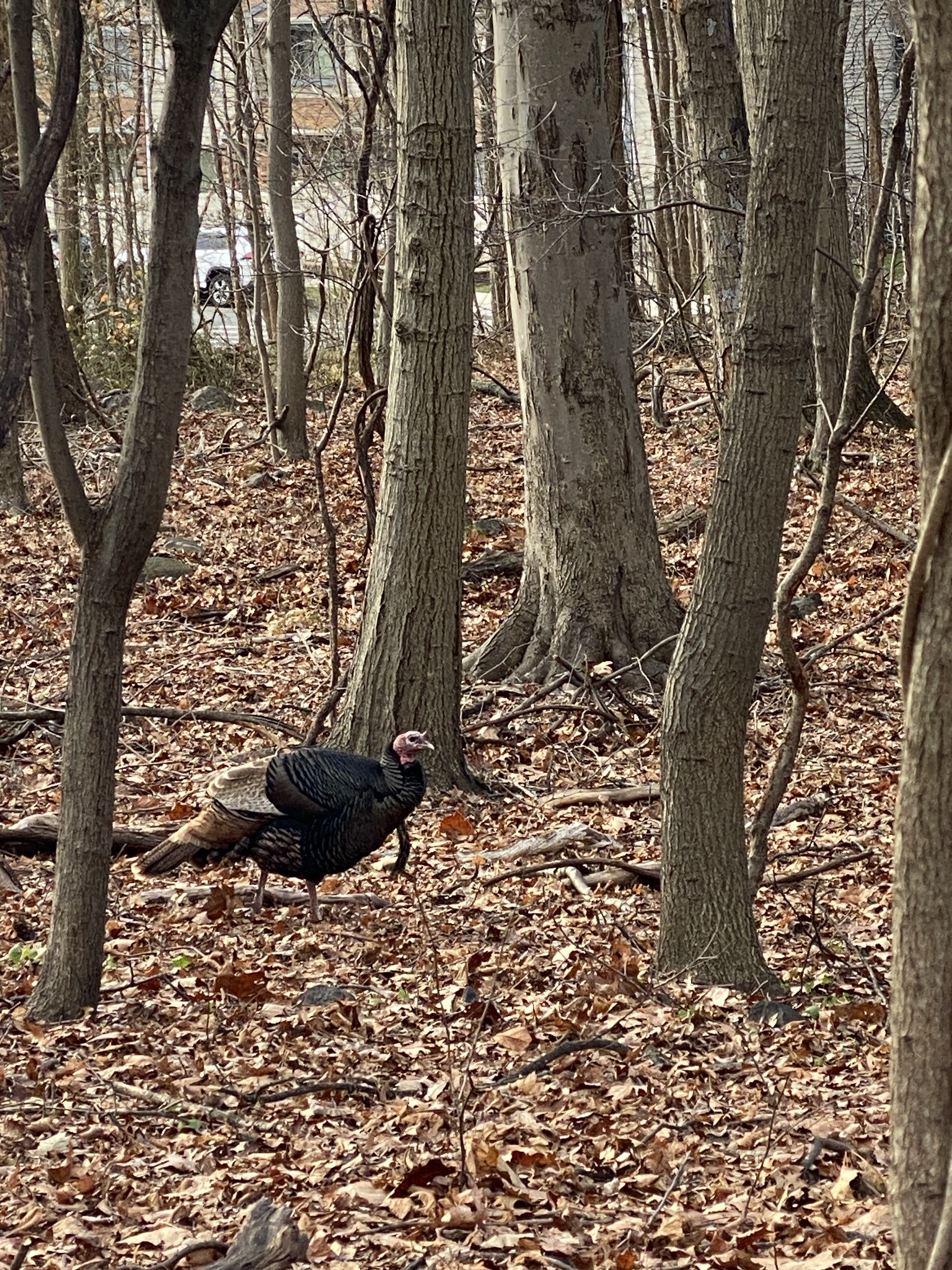
Wild Turkey in Willowbrook Park, 2025

The Greenbelt is one of the most biologically diverse places in New York City. It is home to several species of amphibians; such as the eastern redback salamander, the green frog, the American bullfrog, and the grey tree frog; reptiles; such as the eastern garter snake, the eastern box turtle, and the northern water snake, as well as New York's state reptile, the common snapping turtle. On occasion northern "black" racer and eastern milksnakes have been reported here. Both species are threatened elsewhere on Staten Island due to habitat destruction due to development. The Greenbelt provides a year-round habitat for native mammals like the gray squirrel, eastern chipmunk, eastern cottontail, and the white-tailed deer. Permanent bird residents include the blue jay, northern cardinal, downy woodpecker, wild turkey, and black-capped chickadee, while northern flickers and other migrants use the Greenbelt as a stopover on seasonal migration routes. Raptors such as Cooper's hawks, redtail hawks, and great horned owls also call the greenbelt home. The waterways are rich in fish life, and such species found here include the largemouth bass, bluegill, green sunfish, brown bullhead, black crappie, yellow perch, chain pickerel, as well as several darter species.

== Early settlement ==
The native Lenni-Lenape, who inhabited the island centuries before the arrival of the Dutch, reportedly dubbed Staten Island Aquehonga Monocknong or "the place of bad woods" perhaps because of the spirits they believed dwelled there. Then, as today, the boulder-littered moraines were covered with many species of trees: oak, hickory, maple, beech, as well as lesser quantities of birch, sweet gum, ash, black walnut, wild cherry, and tulip. Below the canopy of this sub-climax forest grew dogwood, ironwood, spicebush, blackberry, wild grape, Virginia creeper, and sassafras, along with royal and cinnamon ferns, skunk cabbage, lady slipper, and trout lilies in the wetter areas.

Within the oak-mulch enriched soil that has been laid down over millennia, arrowheads have been found. These finds attest to both the Leni-Lenape's subsistence on and unsuccessful defense of their home, which contained the natural resources that made it so attractive to first Dutch and then British colonizers in the 17th and 18th centuries. Its forested hills, strategically located between and above the Raritan Bay and the New York Harbor, offered timber for ship building, iron ore for the production of cannonballs, and a staging ground for British troops during the War for Independence.

In the 1800s, several centuries after European settlers had come to, named, deforested, and farmed large portions of Staten Island, travelers of a different sort arrived. Henry David Thoreau – in his furthest journey from his native Massachusetts – came for one year in 1843 in order to tutor the nephews of his friend and fellow transcendentalist, Ralph Waldo Emerson. Some years later, landscape architect Frederick Law Olmsted, famed for his design of urban parks throughout the U.S., (Note: This includes Central Park in Manhattan, Prospect Park, Brooklyn; Mount Royal Park, Montreal; the grounds of the U.S. Capitol, Washington, D.C.; the Boston Emerald Necklace park system; Stanford University, Palo Alto, California; Lake Park, Milwaukee; and Jackson Park, Chicago; Olmsted's most important late work was the design for the World's Columbian Exposition, Chicago (1890–1893).) settled for a time on a 130 acres (53 ha) experimental farm overlooking the Raritan Bay, which he called Tosomock Farm. After 10 years, he and his new bride left the island only to return later in his life. After Olmsted left Tosomock Farm, businessman Erastus Wiman bought it, renaming it "The Woods of Arden", which stands today at 4515 Hylan Boulevard, near Woods of Arden.

== Proposal for a park ==
In 1871, in his capacity as consultant to the Staten Island Improvement Commission, Olmsted made the following proposal for Staten Island:

...it would be a simple plan to form a park … four miles in length … It would occupy a moderately central position and turn to good use a large extent of land … This ridge extends from the Fresh Kills near Richmondtown to Stapleton. But while its altitude is melted away in gentle slopes to the northward…permitting it that quarter the greatest freedom in the location of roads, it descends toward the sea on the south in steep and broken declivities, totally unsuited, not to say impracticable, for roads for rapid travel.

Other proposals on behalf of preserving wilderness on Staten Island were put forward in subsequent years. William T. Davis, a naturalist born on the island, believed:

The best park is certainly a piece of woodland left as Nature arranged it, with a few path cut through it.

When Davis, along with local historian Charles Leng, coauthored a history of Staten Island in 1896, they wrote:

The crowning glory of Staten Island’s topography and scenery is the forest that springs from its rich, well-watered soil … Irregularity of contour and excessive wetness have saved such places from village development; and there is hope that some at least may ultimately become parklands, for which purpose they are eminently suited.

Just one year later, at an 1897 public hearing on the topic of land preservation in Albany, the state's capital, Staten Island resident Erastus Wiman stated:

[The land is] a wilderness of such beauty pervaded this region that no expenditure could improve upon.

== Parkway plan ==
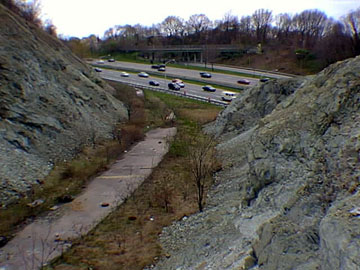
Never-used parkway cut in the park

=== Original plan ===
During the first half of the 20th century, several proposals for Staten Island parks and parkways were drafted first by the Borough of Staten Island and then by the City of New York. During the early 1960s, though the Triborough Bridge and Tunnel Authority chairman Robert Moses revealed plans for what is now the Korean War Veterans Parkway, a parkway that would connect Brooklyn with New Jersey, traversing the island from the soon to be opened Verrazano–Narrows Bridge on the island's North Shore to the Outerbridge Crossing on the southern shore of Staten Island. This original route of the proposed "Richmond Parkway" would have bisected the swath of land on whose behalf Olmsted had pleaded including what is today Fresh Kills, William T. Davis Wildlife Refuge, Reed's Basket Willow Swamp, Willowbrook and High Rock Park.

The 4.8-mile (7.7 km) parkway route going through the area has been de-mapped despite occasional proposals for its revival due to steadily increasing highway congestion on Staten Island. None of these proposals, however, have received any significant support from either the island's elected officials or residents. The parkway ends at the Greenbelt's southwestern edge, at Richmond Avenue and Arthur Kill Road, near the Fresh Kills Park.

=== Opposition ===
Conservation activists, given immediacy by the Federal Highway Act and hope in the person of President John F. Kennedy's Secretary of the Interior, Stewart Udall, mobilized in opposition to these plans. They first saved High Rock Girl Scout Camp, the acreage of which had originally been a part of Pouch Boy Scout Camp, including Orbach Lake, to the north. With a $35,000 grant from the State of New York it was bought from the Boy Scouts and established as Camp High Rock for Girls. For thirteen years, the camp served girl scouts from throughout the five boroughs of New York City. However, in 1964, the Girl scout Council of Greater New York secretly decided to sell the camp to a developer for $1 million. Upon learning about this sale, the New York City Parks Department and the State of New York, with the help of the Open Lands Foundation, raised over $1.3 million to buy back the land from the developer, thus creating High Rock Park.

Then, on 22 November 1965, the Staten Island Citizens Planning Committee (SICPC), which had begun in 1954 as an ad hoc committee of the Unitarian Universalist Church of Staten Island, issued the first of many position papers beginning by invoking Olmsted's plea for a linear park; it concluded by presenting an alternate parkway plan that would spare what has come to be known as the Staten Island Greenbelt, a term proposed by landscape architect, Bradford Greene, one of the group's founding members. Greene was familiar with this policy or land use designation from previous work he had been involved with in Maryland. At the helm of the SICPC, an all-volunteer organization, were several "off-islanders" – young professionals who had moved to Staten Island's North Shore area in the 1950s largely because of the quality of life promised by the open space that still existed. In addition to Bradford Greene, there were Terrence Benbow and Frank Duffy, both attorneys practicing in Manhattan; Robert Hagenhofer, a graphic designer; George Pratt, director of the Staten Island Institute of Arts & Sciences; and New York Times staff writer Alan Oser. Summoning their many and diverse talents, their strategy involved developing and advocating for an alternate route in the press, before public officials, and, when necessary, the courts.

One year into the SICPC's legal fight against the original route of the Richmond Parkway, the Staten Island Greenbelt Natural Areas League (SIGNAL), spearheaded by another resident-journalist, John G. Mitchell, formed as a vehicle for rallying community opposition to the highway construction. From 1966 until the early 1970s, SIGNAL organized thousands of citizens and elected officials (including Planning Commissioner Eleanor Guggenheimer, Parks Commissioner Thomas Hoving, Mayor John V. Lindsay, and U.S. Senator Jacob Javits) to participate in annual winter walks through the highland forests, tracing the route of the proposed (and already mapped) highway route. These two citizen organizations and their combined strategies of lobbying, public relations, and grassroots organizing challenged Robert Moses, who had been thwarted by community efforts only twice before: In 1956, mothers who frequented Manhattan's Central Park with their young children successfully had stopped a proposed parking lot expansion by challenging Moses in court. Two years later, when Robert Moses proposed the construction of a sunken boulevard which would have sped traffic through the middle of the famed Washington Square Park, the Joint Committee to Stop the Lower Manhattan Expressway led by Jane Jacobs, defeated him again.

=== Work continues ===
In spite of opposition, road work began in 1965 on what became known as "Section 1". In 1966 Volmer Associates were hired by the city of New York to describe alternate routes to Section 1. They were proposed, studied, and debated by New York state and city officials, creating contention and divisions even within these governmental units. While travel distance between the island's bridges was on paramount concern to the Triborough Bridge and Tunnel Authority, the City Park Department, led by August Hecksher, commissioned the planning firm Wallace, McHarg, Roberts and Todd. Ian McHarg, a Glasgow born landscape architect, who had stated in his much studied book Design with Nature that engineer road builders were "gouging and scarring the landscape without remorse," headed up the landmark study.

Having pointed out that a method for displaying and factoring social values into highway design and planning had not been developed, McHarg set about creating just that. Long before GIS technology was available, McHarg used data rich maps and overlays which allowed planners to visually understand how social values – historic, residential, economic, recreational, scenic, ecological factors – synergistically interacted with and potentially impacted upon human activity, including road building. Using map transparencies he and his colleagues produced the commissioned report with a recommendation stating that the route to the west of what is today the Greenbelt, was the "least social cost corridor."

Under duress from developers who were eager to begin building homes adjacent to the roadway, the Greenbelt's erstwhile supporters, Mayor John Lindsay and Governor Nelson A. Rockefeller, publicly backed a compromise route. In response, the two citizen organizations were willing to stop at nothing to preserve what John Mitchell, in one of his writings, referred to as "a fine patch of wild". With their combined memberships behind them, the officers of the SICPC and SIGNAL sought injunctive relief in New York State Supreme Court, which meant suing both Lindsay and Rockefeller. The court decision found for the plaintiffs. The citizen planners and conservationists were victorious. The area was earmarked as one of two Special Natural Features Districts in the City of New York, and between 1972 and 1974 the urbanist and architect Peter Verity (now of PDRc) prepared for the New York City Planning Commission the strategic and detailed documentation to support this designation.

=== Remaining parts ===
When the work was halted by the city, excavations were used to construct what was known as "Moses Mountain" and now "Paulo's Peak," a 200-foot rise and viewpoint adjacent to the Manor Road – Rockland Avenue interchange. Other remnants of construction can be seen from the Staten Island Expressway between the Clove Road and Bradley Avenue exits, which are referred to as the abandoned bridges. They are a little west of the Petrides School Complex. This abandoned interchange was removed as part of a $140 million overhaul of the Expressway.

== 1980s expansion ==
In 1982, 25 acres (10 ha) of city-owned land, which heretofore had belonged to the New York City Farm Colony, were added to the Greenbelt; this tract is located on the north side of Rockland Avenue, from Brielle Avenue almost to Forest Hill Road. In 1984, the Staten Island Greenbelt was officially recognized by the city, becoming one of the largest natural areas within the five boroughs of New York City and the second largest park in the city, behind Pelham Bay Park.
