= Christopher House (Staten Island) =

Historic house in New York City

Coordinates: 40°34′18.9″N 74°08′52.3″W

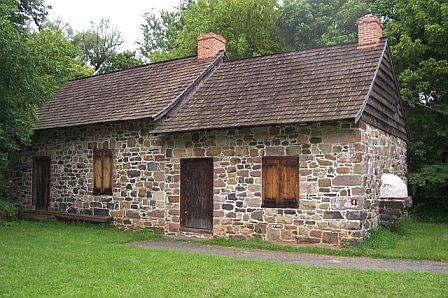
Christopher House

The Christopher House is a stone masonry farmhouse at Historic Richmond Town in Staten Island, New York City. It is associated with two of the oldest Staten Island families. It was also used as a meeting place during the American Revolution, while being the residence of Joseph Christopher, a member of the Richmond County Committee of Safety from 1775 to 1776. It was moved to Historic Richmond Town in late 1969 and restored for museum presentation from 1975 to 1977.

== Construction ==
According to reporting by the Landmarks Preservation Commission in 1967, the original section was built in 1756, and a section twice that size believed to be added about 1764. Current Historic Richmond Town institutional belief, based on extensive research by Loring McMillen, places those dates earlier, to c. 1720 for the original portion, with the addition from c. 1730.

The structure is built in the Colonial salt-box tradition and was originally situated in the section of Staten Island now called Willowbrook. While there, it stood on the brink of the treacherous marshes that covered a great portion of the Island, known as the great swamp. The building consists of two sections, with 22-inch thick native fieldstone walls with wood above. It is one and one-half stories tall, with a low cellar and gable roof.

== Original location ==
The structure was originally near 819 Willowbrook Road, Staten Island. The proximity of the homestead on its original property to the Groad Swamp of those days offered opportunities for escape, in case of surprise, for those who attended the clandestine meetings held in this house during the Revolutionary War.

== Museum interpretation ==
Current interpretive use of this building at Historic Richmond Town demonstrates daily farm life from the mid-to late-18th century. The house is furnished primarily for cooking demonstrations at this time, making use of a restored jamb less fireplace.

== Inhabitants and their occupations ==
- John Christopher (believed to have built the house but may not have been a resident), Farmer?
- Col. Thomas Dongan, (grand-nephew of Governor Thomas Dongan), (1745-1757)
- Nelly Haughwout (by 1761)
- Joseph Christopher Sr. (by 24 May 1764)
- Joseph Christopher Jr. (23 April 1825), Farmer/Cooper-Woodworker
- David Decker (4 September 1827)
- Thomas Standring (19 October 1852 – 15 February 1858), Hardware & Comb Manufacturer
- Samuel Stansring (before 1962), Hardware & Comb Manufacturer
- Mrs. Eugene C. Egan (before 1962)
- Staten Island Historical Society (17 May 1969)

== Call for preservation ==
On September 13, 1966, the Landmarks Preservation Commission held a public hearing on the proposed designation of the Christopher House as a Landmark as well as that of the related Landmark site. The hearing had been duly advertised in accordance with the provisions of the law. Two witnesses spoke in favor of designation; there were no speakers in opposition. The owner of the property indicated to the Commission that he was in favor of the proposed designation. The building was granted New York City Landmark status on December 13, 1967.

In early 1969 the History Committee sent a letter to Senator John Marchi asking for support to preserve the Christopher House. There was also a petition presented showing community support for the preservation of the house.

The community signed the petition, stating:

Whereas Vernon B. Hampton of Staten Island, New York, on a number of occasions through the years has urged the preservation of the Christopher House - a shrine of Patriotism during the American Revolution - Headquarters of the Staten Island Committee of Sarety, and a successful meeting place and shelter for General Washington's secret agents within enemy lines during the long war years of the struggle for American Independence, and
Whereas It is especially appropriate that Acquisition and Restoration of the Christopher House located near Willowbrook Road be implemented at this time in order to assure that the historic shrine shall be the focal point of Staten Island's observance in 1976 of the Bicentennial of American Independence, and
Whereas The significance of the shrine to Richmond County and the State of New York suggests that New York State acquire the Christopher House and a small parksite around it to bring the goal of preservation into actuality. Therefore
I am pleased to join with others in signing this petition and thus promote popular support for the Christopher House Preservation Movement and perhaps the formation of a Christopher House Association.

== See also ==
- List of New York City Designated Landmarks in Staten Island
- National Register of Historic Places listings in Richmond County, New York

== Sources ==
- http://www.neighborhoodpreservationcenter.org/db/bb_files/CHRISTOPHER-HOUSE.pdf
- Franz, William. "Island Swamps Were Battlefield." Staten Island Advance 25 Apr. 1965. Print.
- "Landmarks Commission Report" Reports on Building & Occupants. 13 Dec. 1967
- Mark Linsalata. "Historic House Gets Roof...," Staten Island Advance 28, Nov. 1977. Print
- Judy L. Randall. "Historic Richmond Town going Dutch" Staten Island Advance 15 Nov. 2005. Print
