= Staten Island Museum =

Museum in New York City

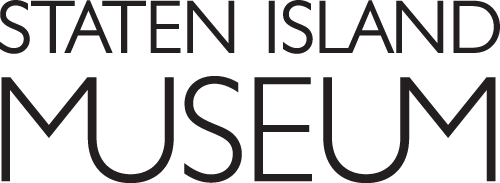

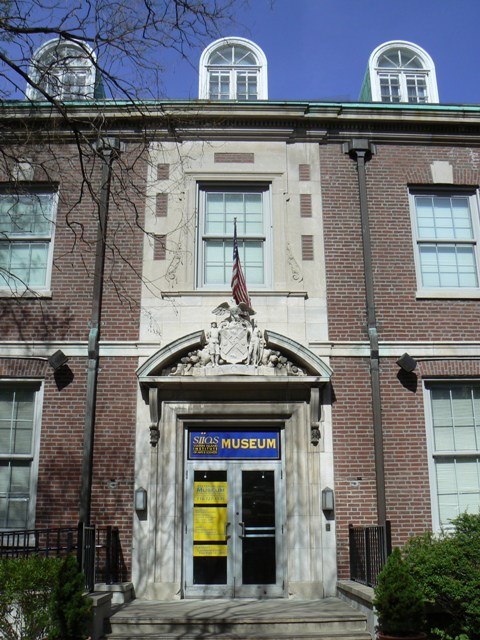
- St. George building
- Established: 1881
- Location: 1000 Richmond Terrace, Staten Island, New York, United States
- Coordinates: 40.6438°N 74.1025°W
- Type: General interest museum
- Public transit access: New York City Bus routes S62 and S44
- Website: www.statenislandmuseum.org

Staten Island Museum (officially the Staten Island Institute of Arts & Sciences) is Staten Island’s oldest cultural institution, and the only remaining general interest museum in New York City.

Founded in 1881 by fourteen of New York City’s first “environmental activists”, the Staten Island Museum houses artifacts and specimens from ancient to contemporary periods. This “mini-Smithsonian” is rich with arts, natural sciences and local history.

The museum's holdings are formally organized into three main collections: Natural Sciences, Fine Art, and History Archives & Library. The natural science collections encompass over 500,000 botanical, biological, anthropological and mineral specimens including bird nests and eggs, mounted animals, fossils, shells, and a significant collection of insects, including important type specimens. Based upon a 19th-century model, the art collection includes works spanning prehistory to the modern period, with representations of diverse world cultures from both the Western and Non-Western traditions. The historical collections include a library, maps and atlases, early films, audio recordings, photographs, historical objects, ephemera and archival documents reaching back to the 17th century.

== History ==
The Staten Island Museum was founded in 1881 as a private society of local naturalists and antiquarians who pooled their personal collections to create the public museum in 1908. William T. Davis, along with Nathaniel Lord Britton, Arthur Hollick, Charles W. Leng, are some of the founding fathers who also contributed significantly to the city's nature preserve, research and education. The museum focused on environmental protection and has participated in the preservation of High Rock Park and the William T. Davis Wildlife Refuge. Since 1908, the staff has conducted annual bird counts together with the Audubon Society. In 1909, the Section of Art was organized, and in 1919 the Staten Island Institute of Arts & Sciences was incorporated to reflect the broader mission which also includes local history.

The museum has been called a "Mini Smithsonian" because of the breadth of its collections, and is based on a 19th-century model of creating within one's own community the complete resources for a cultural education. As a general interest museum, it is one of the last intact examples of the first type of public museum in America, and today serves a diverse audience of 80,000 people annually, with the goal of providing cross-disciplinary exhibitions for a wide cross-section of visitors.

As the oldest cultural organization on Staten Island, the museum has been instrumental in the founding of many other cultural organizations in the area. These include the New York Botanical Garden (the institute's co-founder Nathaniel Lord Britton became its first director), the Staten Island Zoo (originally the Staten Island Zoological Society, a section of the museum in 1933), the Staten Island Historical Society (running Historic Richmond Town), and the Staten Island Children's Museum. The museum also greatly impacted Staten Island's environment, contributing to the preservation of the Greenbelt and the establishment of other environmental organizations.

== Current mission ==
The mission of the Staten Island Museum is to spark curiosity and generate meaningful shared experiences through natural science, art, and history to deepen understanding of our environment, ourselves, and each other.

== Collections ==
=== Art ===
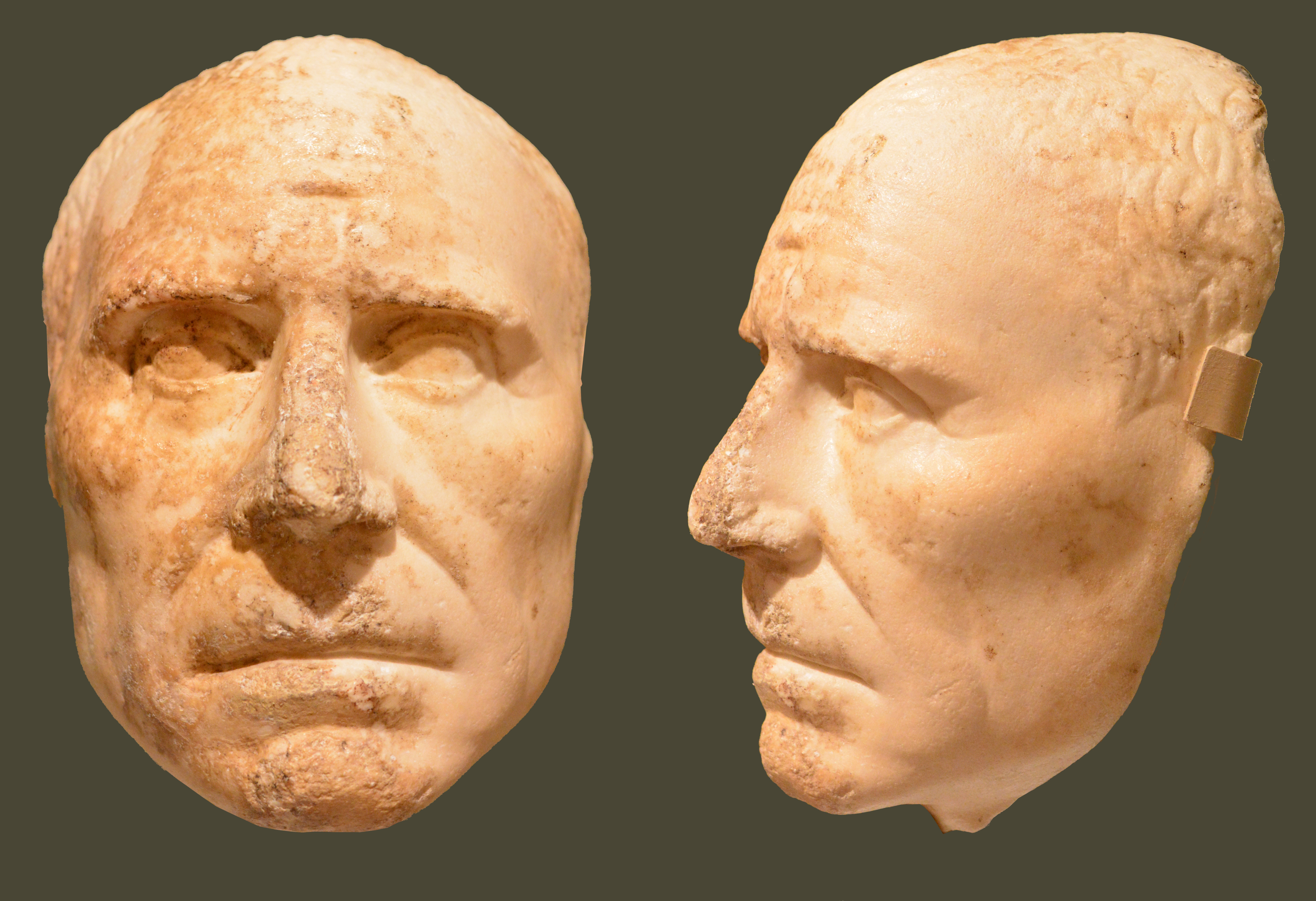
Two views of an Ancient Roman portrait head of a man of rank (1st century BCE or 1st century CE), Staten Island Museum.

The museum's art collection ranges from ancient Egyptian sculpture, to Renaissance paintings, to 19th century Hudson River School landscapes of Staten Island and New York Harbor, to 21st-century abstract art, photography and new media. It is the only museum actively collecting works by contemporary Staten Island artists. Its collections include American landscape paintings, Old Master prints, historic costume pieces and costume accessories, African sculpture and masks, Egyptian, Greek and Roman antiquities, Japanese prints, Pre-Columbian ceramics, ancient and modern Native American artifacts, English and American silver, and both Western and Non-Western objects of vertu, for example collections of Chinese snuff bottles, carved smoking pipes, and pocket watches, the bequests of local benefactor-collectors. It has a group of Samuel H. Kress Italian Renaissance paintings, and several complementary small 19th-century Renaissance-revival bronzes.

There are important 19th–20th-century paintings featuring Staten Island and New York Harbor, fine 19th and 20th-century portraits, and works by prominent local contemporary artists. Examples of traditional representational art in the Staten Island Museum's permanent collection include prints by Rembrandt, Goya, Piranesi and Audubon, paintings by Jasper Francis Cropsey, Thomas Moran, Lawrence Alma-Tadema, Giovanni di Paolo and Il Pordenone, sculpture by Hiram Powers and Gertrude Vanderbilt Whitney. There are Japanese prints by Hiroshige, Hokusai, Utamaro and Kunisada. The Modern Art collection includes works by John Sloan, Guy Pène du Bois, George Bellows, Marc Chagall, Fernand Léger, Aristide Maillol, Andy Warhol, Philip Pearlstein, Isabel Bishop, Peter Max, Donald Judd and the folk artist Clementine Hunter. Over 150 women artists are represented in the Staten Island Museum's holdings.

=== History ===
The museum has over half a million items in the local History Collection, including authentic land grants with the wax seals of King Charles II (1674) and King William III (1696) as well as a 1776 military document signed by William Howe, Commander in Chief of the British Armies.

=== Natural Science ===
The museum houses a 140-year comprehensive record of the changing biodiversity of the New York metro area, with specimens including birds and mammals, a collection of fish, amphibians and reptiles preserved in alcohol, 500,000 mounted insects, and 25,000 plants preserved in the herbarium.

=== Exhibitions ===
- Remember the Mastodon: Diversity & Preservation
- The Wall of Insects
- Staten Island SEEN The borough's history and landscape from the 17th century to the present.
- Opening the Treasure Box: Bringing the World Home Objects from five continents, the oldest from 2000BC.
- From Farm to City History of land use on the island.

== Operations at Snug Harbor ==
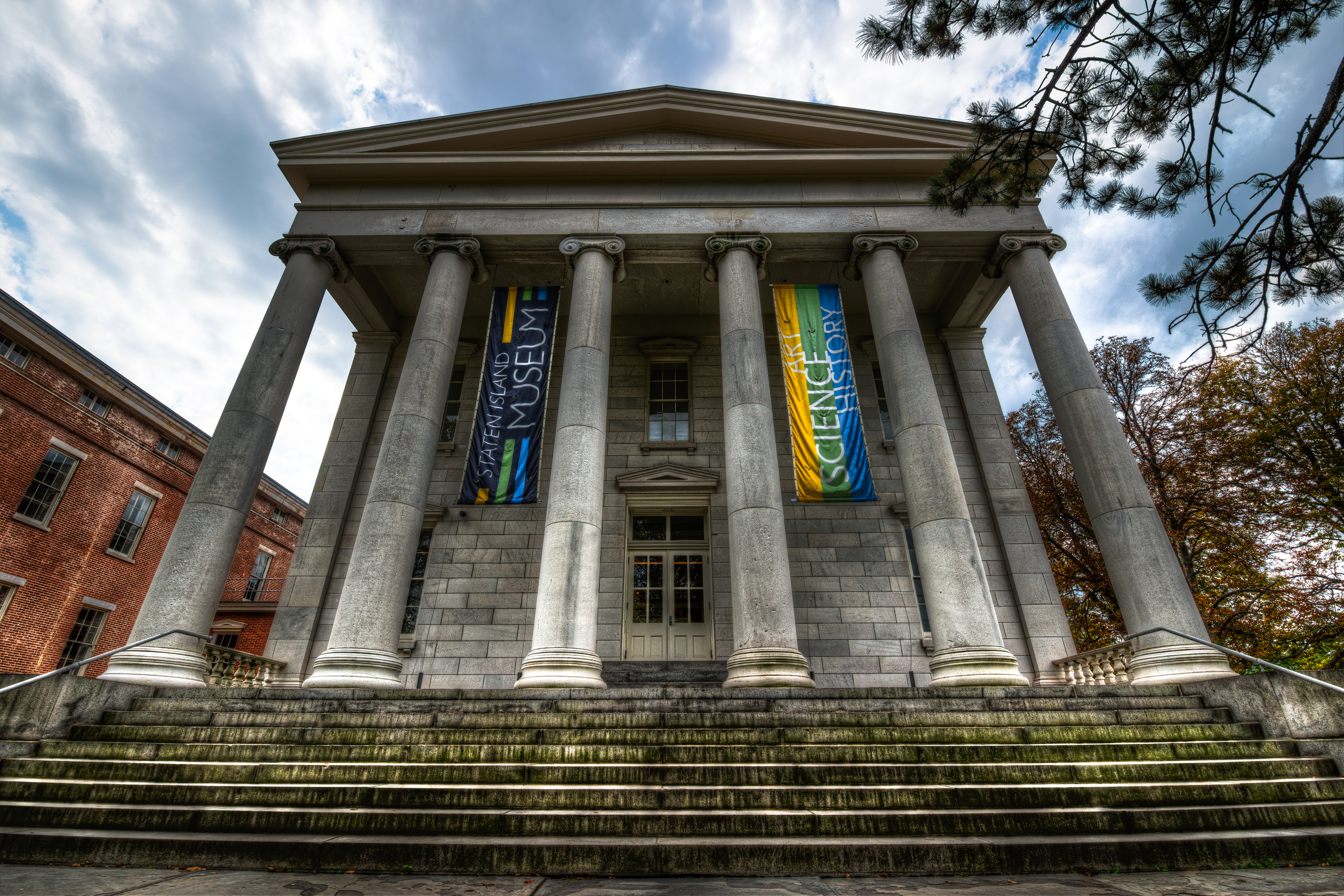
Building A, Snug Harbor

The Staten Island Museum reopened at Snug Harbor in September 2015. In addition, the museum operates its Art Conservation Studio and the Staten Island History Center & Archives at Snug Harbor Cultural Center, joining other cultural institutions at the site. The museum has transformed from the 19th-century model of a museum as a "cabinet of curiosities", into a fully realized 21st-century institution that is accessible, diverse, technologically advanced, and demonstrates leadership in collections management, exhibitions, education and public programming.

The museum, on the Snug Harbor Campus, is the first federal historic landmark on Staten Island designed to achieve LEED Gold certification, including geo-thermal heating and cooling. The mainly city-funded ($23 million) renovation of Building A added over 25,000 square feet (2,300 m^{2}), with additional space to follow in Building B (Bio-Diversity) in 2022.

The museum displays 'Staten Island Scene/Seen', a new interpretation of Staten Island across three centuries, including commissioned works by contemporary artists and featuring Hudson River School landscape paintings by Jasper Cropsey and Edward Moran from the museum's collection.

In addition, a life-size replica of a mastodon greets visitors as they explore the museum, a creature that once roamed the hills of Staten Island as evidenced by local discoveries held in the museum's fossil collection on display in the new lobby.

== See also ==
- List of museums and cultural institutions in New York City
