= St. Charles's Church (Staten Island) =

Catholic parish church in New York, US

Coordinates: 40°33′47.95″N 74°7′2.82″W

The Church of St. Charles
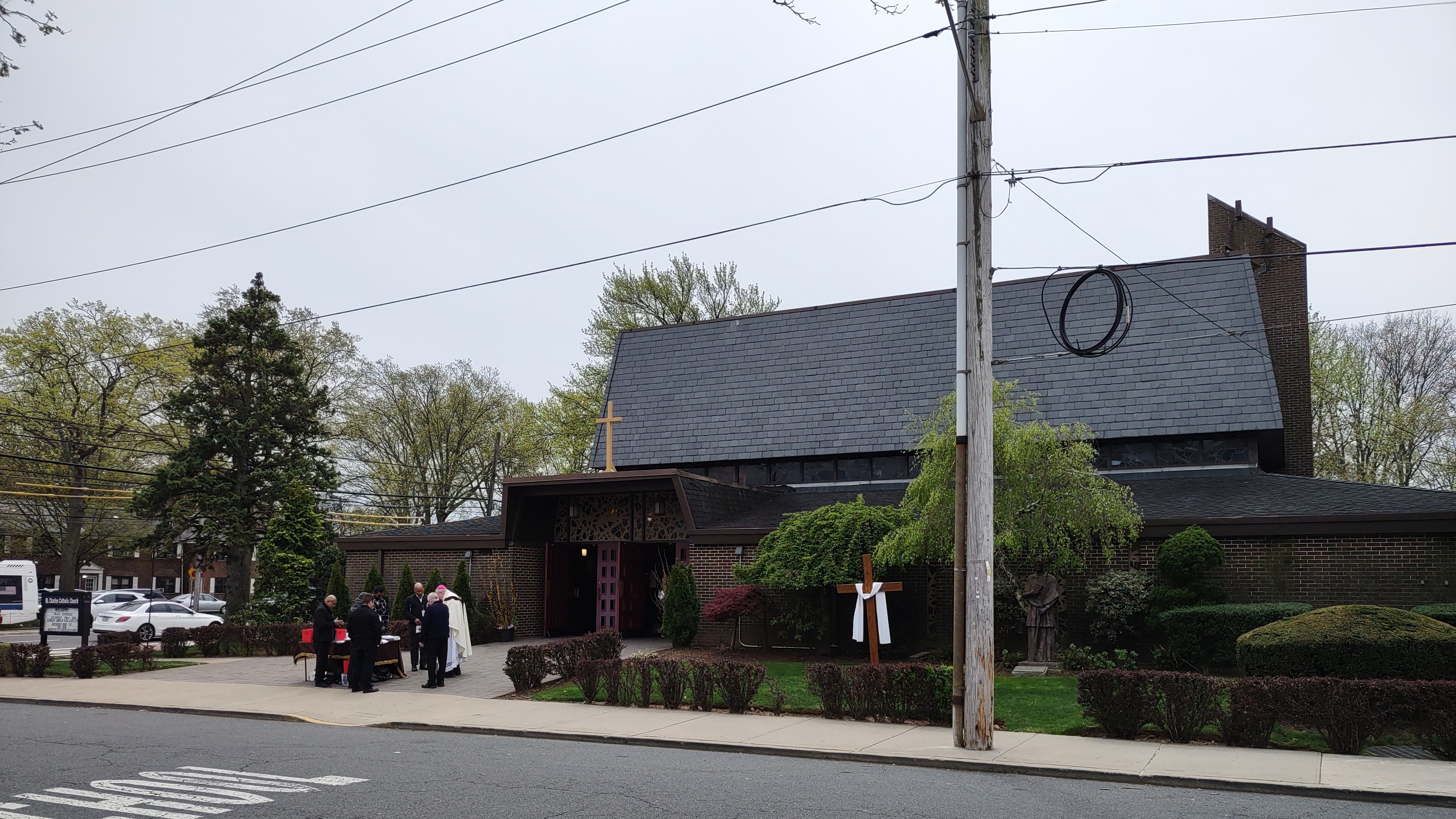
- Interactive map of the The Church of St. Charles area

General information
- Location: Staten Island, New York City, United States of America
- Completed: 1973
- Client: Roman Catholic Archdiocese of New York

The Church of St. Charles is a parish church in the Roman Catholic Archdiocese of New York, at 644 Clawson Street in the Oakwood neighborhood of Staten Island, New York City.

St. Charles Church was named for the 16th-century Italian saint Charles Borromeo, and was originally located on Mill Road, established in 1922 as a mission church of Richmondtown's Church of St. Patrick. St. Charles achieved independent parish status in 1960. Its Catholic school opened in 1963 and received its own building in 1964. The new church building on Clawson Street was opened in 1973.

St. Charles was the first parish assignment of Father John Joseph O'Hara, a future bishop who returned to St. Charles as his Staten Island residence.
