= Voorlezer's House =

Historic house in Staten Island, New York

- U.S. National Register of Historic Places
- U.S. National Historic Landmark
- New York State Register of Historic Places
- New York City Landmark
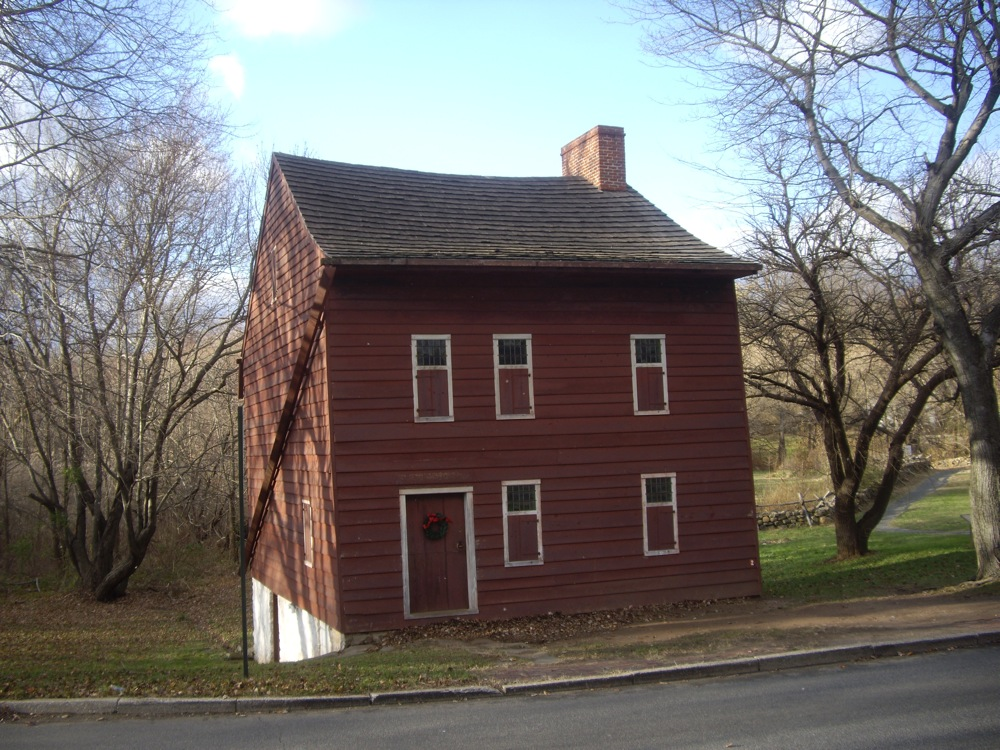

- Location within New York City Location within New York Location within the United States
- Location: Richmondtown, Staten Island, NY
- Coordinates: 40°34′17.1″N 74°8′51″W
- Built: 1760s
- Architectural style: Dutch-influenced vernacular
- NRHP reference No.: 66000565
- NYSRHP No.: 08501.000918
- NYCL No.: 0397A

Significant dates
- Added to NRHP: October 15, 1966
- Designated NHL: November 5, 1961
- Designated NYSRHP: June 23, 1980
- Designated NYCL: August 26, 1969

The Voorlezer's House is a historic clapboard frame house in Historic Richmond Town in Staten Island, New York. It was previously believed to be the oldest known schoolhouse in what is now the United States. The present structure became a private residence for more than a century and is now owned and operated by the Staten Island Historical Society. Despite being traditionally dated to before 1696 and sitting on land patented in 1680, it is more likely to have been constructed in the mid-eighteenth century, probably in the 1760s by Jacob Rezeau, whose family came into possession of the property in 1705.

Though well-maintained for many years, by 1936 the building had fallen into disrepair and was threatened with demolition. It was acquired by the museum in 1939 and then restored to how it was believed to have appeared around the turn of the eighteenth century. It was first opened to the public on April 14, 1942, and then again, after its second restoration, on June 27, 1985. It became a National Historic Landmark in 1961 and was added to the National Register of Historic Places when that registry was created in 1966.

== Etymology ==
"Voorlezer" is a Dutch word that can be translated as "fore-reader" or as "one who reads (to others)". A Voorlezer or Voorleser was the title given to a highly responsible citizen in New Netherland and later Dutch settlements in North America, who had semi-official duties in local law, education and religion. The title was predominantly used from the mid-17th century to the late 18th century in the small colonial villages. A Voorlezer could be an assistant to a pastor or, in the absence of a pastor, hold religious services and read scriptures, or run a school.

== Architecture ==
The roof has an unequal pitch because the front of the house is 2 feet (0.61 m) higher than the rear. The foundation walls are 2 feet (0.61 m) thick, and constructed of undressed field stone laid up in mud and mortar. All timbers are of oak or white wood, cut in nearby forests and hewn to size with a broadaxe. A massive stone-and-brick chimney is at the northeast end of the house. Around 1800, the present staircases were substituted for the straight, ladder-like stairs believed to have been used originally. The house is built in Dutch-influenced vernacular architecture.

The first floor contains a small room used as living quarters and a large room for church services. The second floor has a small bedchamber, and a large room that is believed to be the one used for the school. The extra set of floor beams indicate that the room was designed to accommodate a large number of persons. The floors in the house are of white pine boards, 14–16 inches (36–41 cm) wide. The windows and doors, the originals of which have been replaced, have the low and wide proportions of the originals.

== History ==
=== Size of original lot ===
The original land grant given to Robert Rider in 1680 by English Governor Sir Edmund Andros was for 320 acres of land and 37 acres of salt meadow. In 1697, the Dutch Reformed Congregation acquired a parcel of approximately 271 square feet of the then 80 acre parcel from James Hance Dye and James Fitchett, on which to build the house.

=== Use by the Dutch Reformed congregation ===
While never officially consecrated as a place of worship, a now-lost structure near the Voorlezer's House (possibly the original schoolhouse) was used as a meeting place for members of the Dutch Reformed Congregation until the French Church (established in Greenridge, and lasting only about 15 years) was built in 1698, and later in 1718 when a permanent Dutch Reformed Church was established on the north shore of the Island. Despite the congregation's brief stay in Richmond, the Voorlezer's House was attended actively and its presence there (only the second or third building in the village) was the beginning of Richmond's significance as a service and civic center for Staten Island. Only a few years later the county seat would be established there, as well as St. Andrew's Church for an English congregation in 1709–1712.

=== Use as a schoolhouse ===
It is not clear whether the present building ever served as a schoolhouse, and Voorlezer Hendrick Kroesen only occupied the site from 1696 until 1701. The structure inhabited by Kroesen during this period was likely lost in the early eighteenth century. Children attending the Voorlezer's house while it functioned as a school were most likely between the ages of 7 and 12, and were both male and female. Schooling would have been paid for by parents by subject, which were probably taught in the Dutch language.

Subjects most likely included:

1. Reading. Students may have used hornbooks but there were many textbooks from Amsterdam available at the time, such as "Stairway of Youth" which was 12 lessons that built on each other, supplemented by "Great and Small ABC"
2. Writing. Many students may not have learned this.
3. Arithmetic. An important skill for both boys and girls to learn to be able to maintain household and business accounts as adults.
4. Religion. Students were expected to memorize the 129 questions and answers of the Heidelberg Catechism, which was used from 1563 until the 1800s.
5. Dutch history. This "new" subject would teach students about the Dutch Independence War from Spain.

=== Restoration ===
In 1981, the building was closed for major renovation to stabilize the structure while retaining as much of its historic fabric as possible. The kitchen was restored, and most notably, the leaded casement windows were installed to more accurately represent its appearance of a circa 1696 structure.

== Inhabitants and their occupations ==
- 1696–1701: Hendrick Kroesen; Voorlezer
- 1701–1705: House ownership changed three times
- 1705–1720: Rene Rezeau; farmer
- 1720–1793: Rezeau family; farmers
- 1793–1871: Van Pelt family; farmers
- 1871–1872: Harriet Wheately; residence
- 1872–1883: Martin Mooney; farm laborer, residence
- 1883–1893: Solomon Rosenberg & family; store, residence
- 1893–1924: Solomon Rosenberg & family; hotel-saloon (Arlington Hotel), residence
- 1925–1938: Nicholas George; restaurateur, tavern keeper (Acorn Inn), residence
- 1939: Structure donated to Staten Island Historical Society by Mrs. T. Livingston Kennedy

== See also ==
- List of the oldest buildings in New York
- Architecture of New York City
- List of New York City Designated Landmarks in Staten Island
- National Register of Historic Places listings in Staten Island
- List of National Historic Landmarks in New York City
