= John Bennett House =

Coordinates: 40°34′18.4″N 74°08′44.3″W

The John Bennett House was built in 1839 in Historic Richmondtown, Staten Island, New York. It was built as part of a real estate development near the Third County Courthouse, with an addition built in 1854. This Greek Revival style residence was home to shipping merchant John Bennett and his family from c.1848-1917. The building later served as a restaurant. A seasonal cafe and restaurant is located in the cellar bakery and is accessible from Richmond Road.

== See also ==
- List of New York City Designated Landmarks in Staten Island
- National Register of Historic Places listings in Richmond County, New York
