= Boehm House =

Coordinates: 40°34′18.1″N 74°08′50.3″W

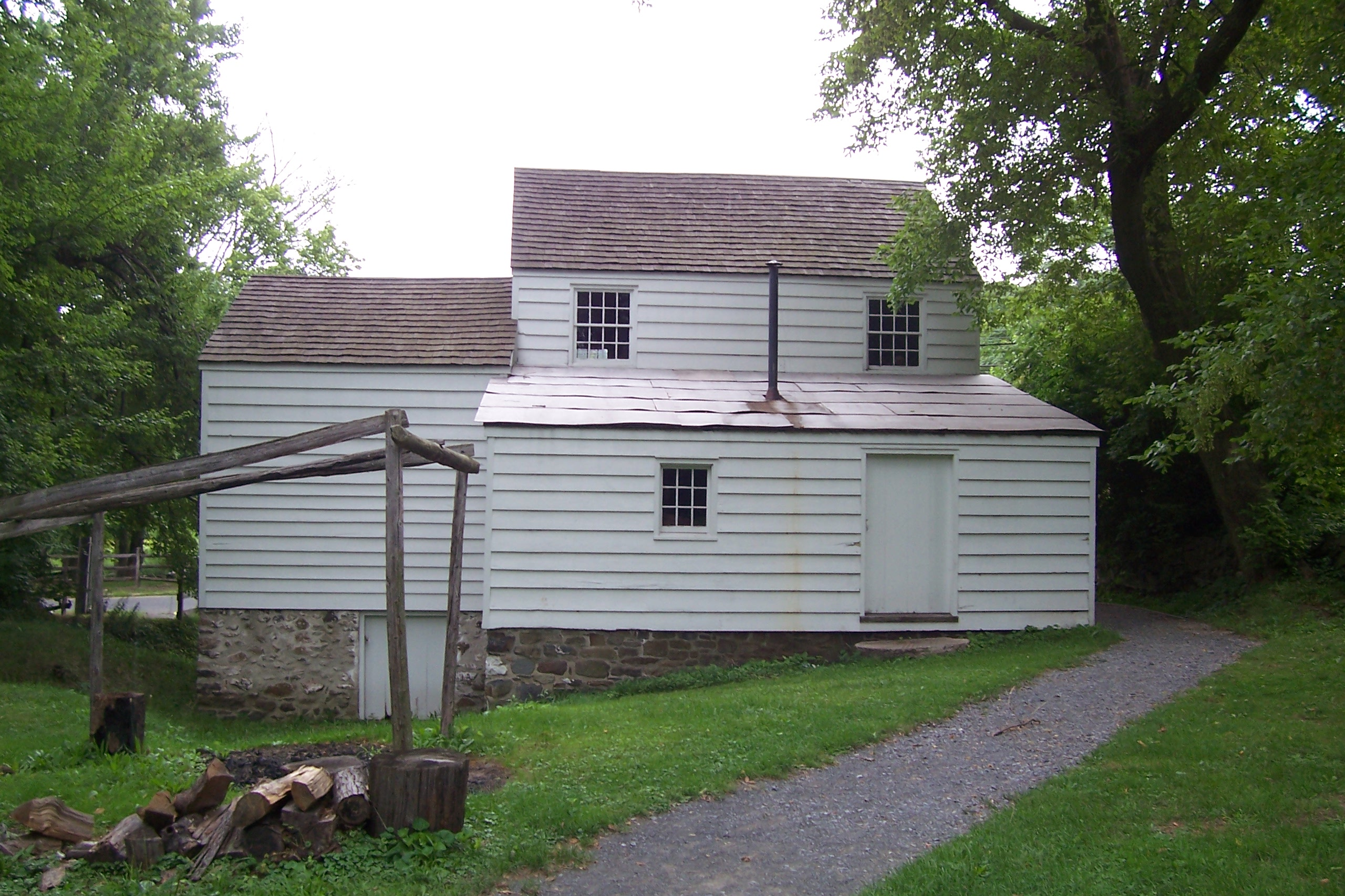
Rear of the Boehm House

The Boehm House is an historic house at 75 Arthur Kill Road in the Richmondtown section of the borough of Staten Island in New York City. This 1750 house, relocated from Greenridge as a part of Historic Richmondtown, was typical of rural New York during the American Revolution. Also on view in the house: an exhibit of early building techniques and restorations. It was designated a New York City landmark in 1969 as the "Boehm-Frost House".

== See also ==
- List of New York City Designated Landmarks in Staten Island
- National Register of Historic Places listings in Richmond County, New York
