= Stephens-Black House =

Coordinates: 40°34′16.5″N 74°08′43.9″W

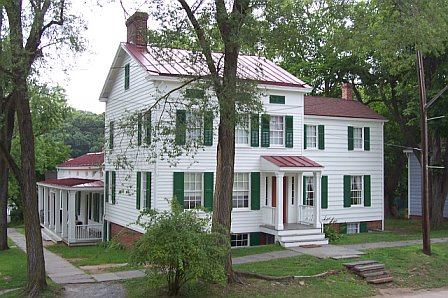
Stephens-Black House

The Stephens-Black House is a 19th-century house featured in Historic Richmond Town on Staten Island, New York City. It was designated as a New York City Landmark on August 26, 1969.

== Architecture ==
The deed to the Stephens-Black House suggests that its construction began shortly after 2 February 1837, but the house is generally dated to 1838-40. It is located on a 25 by 100 foot plot at the corners of Center Street and Court Place. It was built in a modified Greek Revival style. The main floor of the original structure included a side hall entry with two adjoining formal parlors. The second floor originally housed three large bedrooms. The third parlor was added onto the western side of the structure sometime after 1840. Two more bedrooms were added above the third parlor. The basement of the structure houses both a functioning 1830s kitchen and what was once the home's dining room. The adjoining general store was built as a series of additions between 1840 and 1870.

=== As a museum ===
The house is currently open and interpreted as of approximately 1860 with historically accurate reproduction wallpaper, carpet, and window treatments. In 2012, the House was used as the Kinneret Lodge during the filming of Boardwalk Empire.

== People ==
Stephen Dover Stephens, born in 1808, was the original owner. He owned the home and operated the store between 1837 and 1870. He was married to Elizabeth Johnson in 1829 at Saint Andrew's Church, which is also located in Richmondtown. Their five children Stephen Dover Jr., William James, Lucretia, Mary Elizabeth Jr, and Charlotte Ann were all baptized at that same church.

In 1870 both the home and the connected store were sold to Mary and Joseph Black. The Stephens family then moved up the road to the Stephens Prior House. Mr and Mrs. Stephens both resided there until their deaths in 1883. The Black family raised eleven children in the home and their family operated the store until 1926. In 1926 the remaining members of the Black family sold the store to Willet and Bertha Conner who operated a post office in the store until the time of the Second World War. After which the house was separated into two apartments and rented until it became property of Historic Richmond Town and was subsequently designated as a landmark.

== See also ==
- List of New York City Designated Landmarks in Staten Island
- National Register of Historic Places listings in Richmond County, New York
