= Bill Richmond =

British boxer

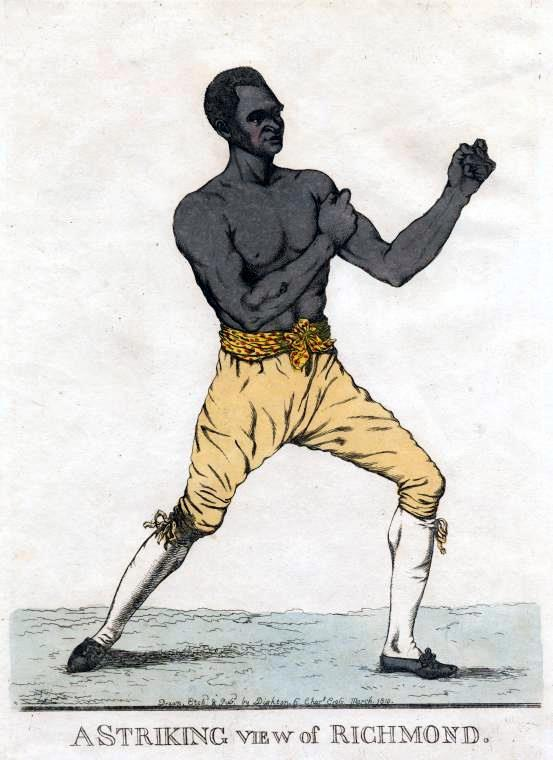
- 1810 depiction of Richmond

Personal information
- Nickname: The Black Terror
- Nationality: British
- Born: 5 August 1763 Cuckold's Town, New York, British America
- Died: 28 December 1829 (aged 66) London, England
- Height: 5 ft 9 in (175 cm)
- Weight: Welterweight

Boxing career

Boxing record
- Total fights: 19
- Wins: 17
- Win by KO: N/A
- Losses: 2
- Draws: 0
- No contests: 0

Bill Richmond (5 August 1763 – 28 December 1829) was a British boxer, born into slavery in Richmondtown, New York. Although born in Colonial America, he lived for the majority of his life in England, where all his boxing contests took place. Richmond arrived in England in 1777, where he had his education paid for. He then apprenticed as a cabinetmaker in York.

In the early 1790s, Richmond married a local English woman, whose name was probably Mary Dunwick, in a marriage recorded in Wakefield on 29 June 1791. Richmond and his wife had several children.

According to boxing writer Pierce Egan, the well-dressed, literate and self-confident Richmond came on the receiving end of racist attitudes in Yorkshire. Egan described several brawls involving Richmond because of insults. One brawl occurred after someone labelled Richmond a "black devil" for being with a white woman—probably a reference to Richmond's wife.

According to Egan, Richmond fought and won five boxing matches in Yorkshire, defeating George "Dockey" Moore, two unnamed soldiers, one unnamed blacksmith and Frank Myers.

== Early life ==
Bill Richmond was enslaved at birth by the Rev. Richard Charlton in Richmondtown on Staten Island, New York on 5 August 1763. A commander of the British forces in New York during the American War of Independence, Lord Percy witnessed the teenage Richmond in a tavern brawl involving British soldiers. Percy subsequently arranged fights with other British soldiers for the entertainment of his guests. In 1777, Percy arranged for Richmond's liberation in Charlton, as well as transport to northern England, literacy education, and an apprenticeship with a cabinet-maker in Yorkshire. Richmond met his wife, Mary, while working as a cabinet-maker in Yorkshire. The two moved to London, where Richmond started boxing in his forties.

By 1795, Richmond and his family had moved to London. He became an employee and household member of Thomas Pitt, 2nd Baron Camelford, a British peer and naval officer. A boxing enthusiast, Pitt may have received boxing and gymnastic instruction from Richmond. Pitt and Richmond visited several prize fights together.

== Boxing career ==
=== Richmond versus Maddox ===
On 23 January 1804, Pitt and Richmond attended a boxing match featuring experienced boxer George Maddox. After Maddox won the bout, Richmond spontaneously challenged Maddox to a fight, which Maddox accepted. When the fight took place, Maddox defeated Richmond in nine rounds.

After Pitt's death in a duel on 11 March 1804, Richmond left the household and returned to boxing. He began training and seconding other fighters and was soon a regular attendee at the Fives Court, London's leading pugilistic exhibition venue on St Martin's Street in Westminster.

=== Richmond versus Cribb ===
By 1805, Richmond had defeated the Jewish boxer Youssop and Jack Holmes. These victories gave Richmond the opportunity to challenge the famous Tom Cribb to a fight. During the ensuing bout, Cribb and Richmond's counter-punching styles resulted in what observers considered a "dull bout". Cribb won, leaving Richmond in tears. The contest solidified a grudge between the two men that would last for many years.

=== Richmond versus Maddox II ===
In 1808, Richmond returned to boxing. After several quick wins, he secured a rematch with George Maddox. The contest, in August 1809, demonstrated Richmond's mastery of "boxing on the retreat". He battered Maddox mercilessly, winning the bout. A spectator, William Windham, MP, later argued both boxers demonstrated skill and bravery as impressive as that displayed by British troops in their triumph that year at the Battle of Talavera.

=== Molineaux versus Cribb I and II ===
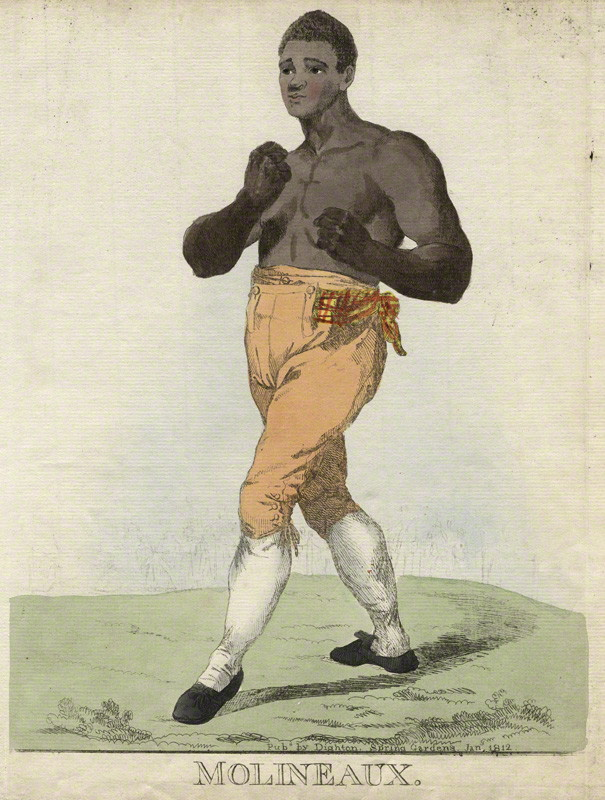
Tom Molineaux, trainee of Bill Richmond

Richmond's winnings allowed him to buy the Horse and Dolphin pub in St Martin's Street near Leicester Square in London. It was at the pub that Richmond probably met Tom Molineaux, another former American slave. Richmond immediately saw Molineaux's potential as a boxer, and decided to put aside his own boxing career and to train Molineaux. Their goal was to challenge Cribb, now the national champion. With Richmond as his trainer, Molineaux decisively won two fights, then challenged Cribb.

In December 1810, Cribb and Molineaux fought at Copthall Common in East Grinstead, Sussex. It was an epic contest, and one of the most controversial bouts in boxing history—Cribb won, barely, amid the chaos of a ring invasion and whisperings of a long count that had allowed the champion longer than the allowable 30 seconds to recover in between rounds. Molineaux, many maintained, had been cheated.

Historians disagree about whether the alleged bias shown to Cribb was motivated by Molineaux's race or fears on the part of Cribb's backers that they would lose their wagers. Certainly, before the fight there was nervousness about the prospect of a Molineaux victory, with the Chester Chronicle reporting that "many of the noble patronizers [sic] of this accomplished art, begin to be alarmed, lest, to the eternal dishonour of our country, a negro should become the Champion of England!"

In October 1811, Molineaux and Cribb fought a rematch, which Cribb won easily. After the match, Molineaux fired Richmond as his trainer.

=== Richmond versus Shelton ===
Having lost money brokering and betting on the Molineaux-Cribb fight, Richmond had to sell the Horse and Dolphin and rebuild his fortune. He became a member of the Pugilistic Society, the sport's first governing body in the United Kingdom. In May 1814, at the age of 50, Richmond fought Jack Davis and won.

The victory over Davis encouraged Richmond to accept a fight with Tom Shelton, a respected contender who was about half his age. After suffering a horrendous eye injury early on, Richmond beat Shelton down after 23 rounds. When the fight was over, Richmond jumped over the ropes with joy to celebrate the defining moment of his career. "Impetuous men must not fight Richmond," Egan declared, "as in his hands they become victims to their own temerity … The older he grows, the better pugilist he proves himself … He is an extraordinary man."

== Later life ==
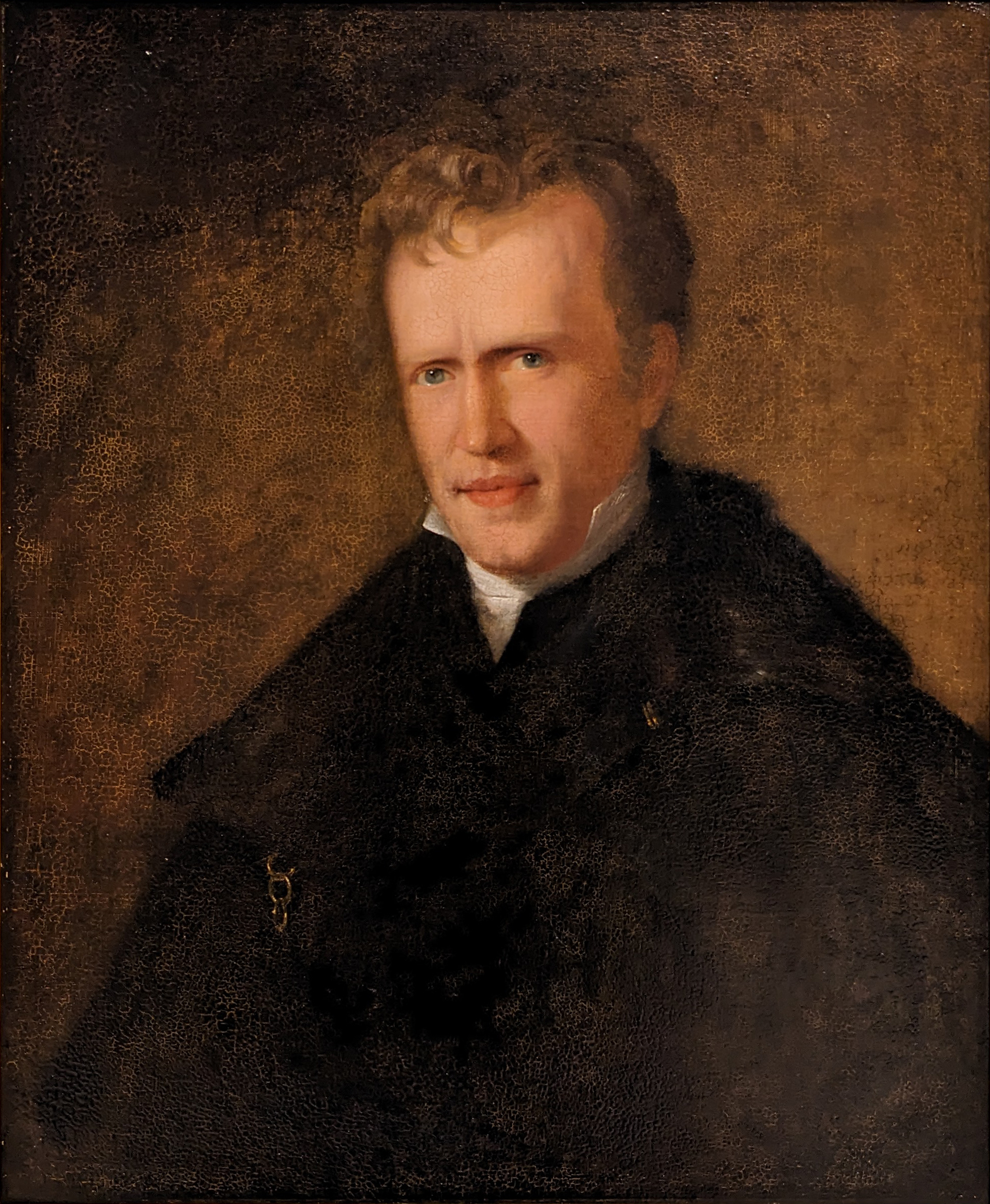
John Neal, one of Richmond's late-life boxing academy pupils

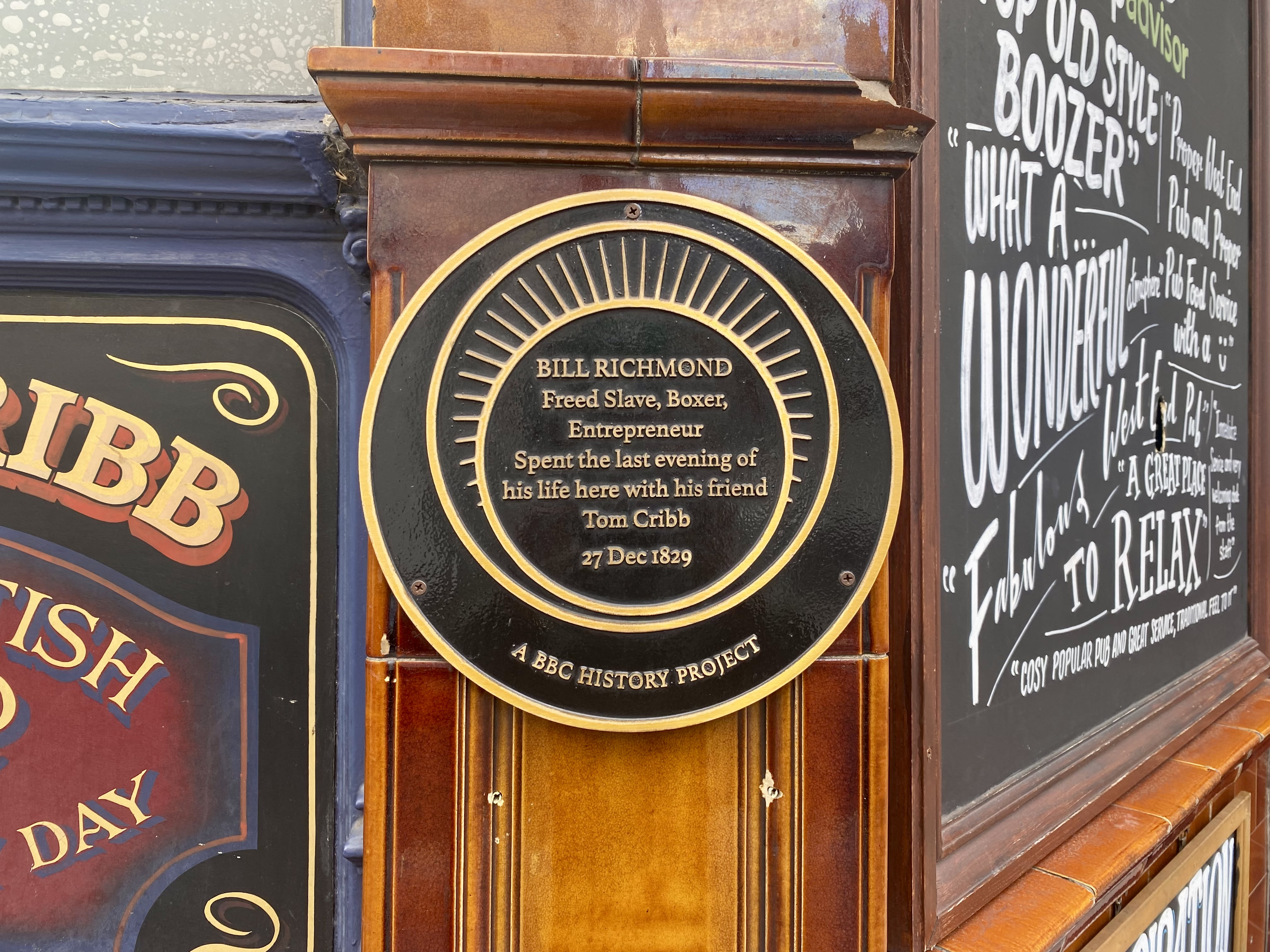
A plaque honouring Richmond on the Tom Cribb pub in Westminster

Such achievements warranted a title shot, but with Cribb inactive, Richmond opted for retirement instead. His position among England's leading pugilists was assured; he twice exhibited his skills for visiting European royalty and was among the most respected and admired of pugilistic trainers and instructors. Even more remarkably, Richmond was one of the pugilists selected to act as an usher at the coronation of George IV in 1821, earning a letter of thanks from Lord Gwydyr and the Home Secretary Lord Sidmouth.

In the 1820s Richmond ran a boxing academy, in which he trained many amateur boxers, including literary figures like William Hazlitt, Lord Byron, and American John Neal.

In his later years, Richmond became close friends with Cribb. The two men often conversed late into the night at Cribb's pub, the Union Arms on Panton Street in Westminster. It was here that Richmond spent his last evening, before he died at age 66 in December 1829.

His body was interred in the burial ground of St James's Church, Piccadilly, which was located some way from the church, beside Hampstead Road, Camden, London.

== Nathan Hale ==
Some historians have claimed that on 22 September 1776, Richmond tied the rope that was used to hang Nathan Hale. However, Luke G. Williams, in his biography of Richmond, entitled Richmond Unchained, claims that the Richmond who served as the hangman of Hale was not Bill Richmond, but another man of the same surname. Williams writes that:

The Richmond-as-hangman theory took root due to a coalescence of circumstantial evidence: numerous accounts of Hale's execution feature references to a black or mulatto hangman named Richmond (for example, the 1856 book Life of Nathan Hale: The Martyr Spy of the American Revolution, refers to the 'negro Richmond, the common hangman'); artwork of the execution published by Harpers Weekly in 1860 shows a black man holding the hanging rope; and then there is Richmond's connection to Percy and the British military, as well as the proximity of Staten Island to the site of Hale's execution in Manhattan. Given this series of coincidences, it seems a reasonable enough piece of speculation. However several hitherto ignored sources from the eighteenth century directly contradict the possibility of Richmond being involved. Quite simply, Hale's hangman may have been black and named Richmond, but he wasn't Bill Richmond. Rather, as reports in the Gaines Mercury and Royal Gazette indicate, he was a Pennsylvania runaway with the same surname as Bill who ended up working as the hangman for the notorious Boston Provost Marshal William Cunningham. The hangman Richmond absconded from his duties in 1781, Cunningham offering a one-guinea reward for his return a full four years after Bill Richmond's likely departure for England.

== In popular culture ==
In 2010, he was portrayed in the CBBC sketch show Horrible Histories.

William Mondrich, the boxer in the Regency TV Show Bridgerton, is based on him.
