= John Joseph O'Hara =

American prelate

His Excellency, The Most Reverend John Joseph O'Hara
- Auxiliary Bishop Emeritus of New York; Titular Bishop of Ath Truim
- Church: Roman Catholic
- Archdiocese: New York
- Appointed: June 14, 2014
- Installed: August 4, 2014
- Retired: April 7, 2021
- Other post: Titular Bishop of Ath Truim

Orders
- Ordination: December 1, 1984 by John Joseph O'Connor
- Consecration: August 4, 2014 by Timothy M. Dolan, Gerald Thomas Walsh, and Dominick John Lagonegro

Personal details
- Born: February 7, 1946 (age 80) Jersey City, New Jersey, U.S.
- Residence: St. Agnes' Church (Manhattan), St. Charles' Church (Staten Is.)
- Motto: Jesus, I trust in you

Styles of John Joseph O'Hara
- Reference style: His Excellency; The Most Reverend
- Spoken style: Your Excellency
- Religious style: Bishop

John Joseph O'Hara (born February 7, 1946) is an American prelate of the Catholic Church, who served as an auxiliary bishop of the Archdiocese of New York from 2014 to 2021.

== Biography ==
=== Early life ===
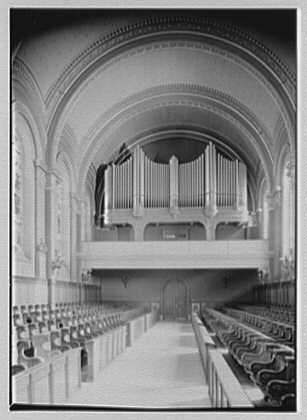
St. Joseph's Seminary, Yonkers, New York (1943)

O'Hara was born on February 7, 1946, in Jersey City, New Jersey, and was educated in a Catholic elementary school in Ridgewood, New Jersey, and at Don Bosco Preparatory High School in Ramsey, New Jersey. He earned a Bachelor of English degree from Seton Hall University in South Orange, New Jersey. While a student, O'Hara was active in the school's radio station, WSOU, serving as news director during the 1966-67 academic year. O'Hara worked in broadcast journalism for 13 years before entering St. Joseph's Seminary in Yonkers, New York.

=== Priesthood ===
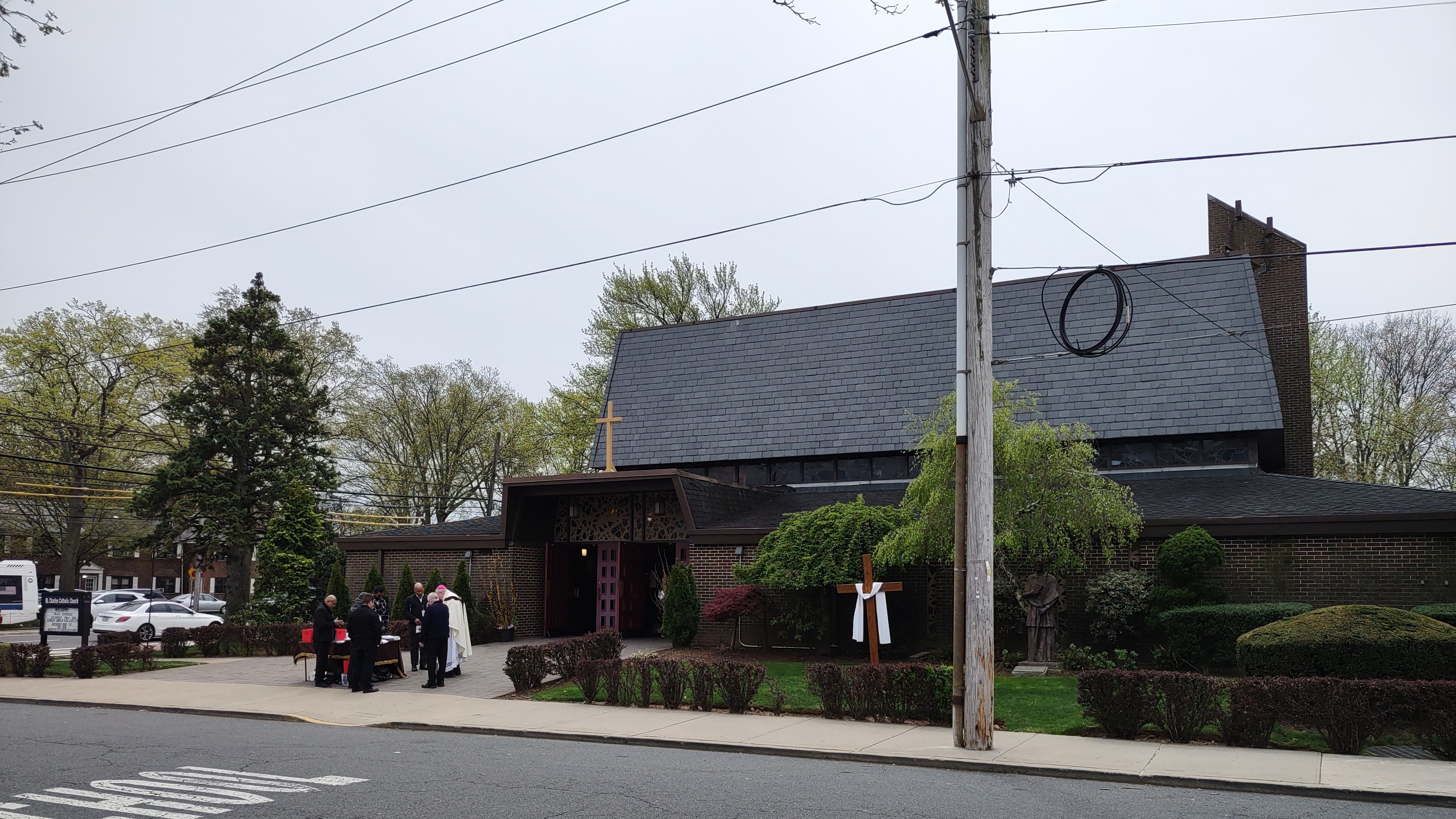
St. Charles's Church, New York City (2024)

O'Hara was ordained into the priesthood for the Archdiocese of New York by Archbishop John O'Connor on December 1, 1984. His assignments, both in Staten Island, included St. Charles Parish' as parochial vicar from 1984 to 1992, and St. Teresa's Parish from 1992 to 2012 as both parochial vicar and pastor. O'Hara served as the director of strategic pastoral planning for the archdiocese from 2012 to 2022, where he led the "Making All Things New" planning process for parish mergers.

=== Auxiliary Bishop of New York ===
O'Hara was named titular bishop of Ath Truim and an auxiliary bishop of the Archdiocese of New York by Pope Francis on June 14, 2014. He was consecrated by Cardinal Timothy Dolan in St. Patrick's Cathedral in Manhattan on August 4, 2014. Auxiliary bishops Gerald Walsh and Dominick Lagonegro were the co-consecrators. O'Hara's crosier had been used by Cardinal Terence Cooke, a former archbishop of New York.

In October 2017, O'Hara intervened to prevent the International Human Rights Art Festival from performing at one of the churches in the archdiocese due to some gay and transgender content. The archdiocese offered to host the event if these specific acts were rejected, but the festival director declined. In contrast, after Staten Island's 2020 Saint Patrick's Parade was heavily criticized for excluding supporters of LBGTQ+ rights, O'Hara planned to meet with the "hard line" parade organizer to urge "change in the future".

=== Retirement ===
On February 7, 2021, O'Hara reached the mandatory retirement age of 75 and submitted his letter of resignation as auxiliary bishop of New York to Pope Francis, as required by canon law. On April 7, 2021, the pope accepted O'Hara's resignation. He has continued to serve as episcopal vicar of Staten Island and as vicar of planning for the archdiocese.

== See also ==
- Catholic Church hierarchy
- Catholic Church in the United States
- Historical list of the Catholic bishops of the United States
- List of Catholic bishops of the United States
- Lists of patriarchs, archbishops, and bishops
