= Protectors of Pine Oak Woods =

Environmental organization in New York City

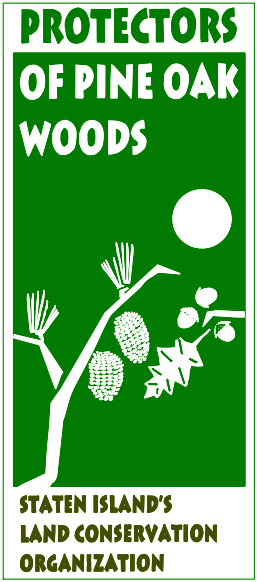
- Formation: 1975; 49 years ago
- Founder: Joseph Fernicola, Edward Milanese, Richard Buegler
- Tax ID no.: 51-0161823
- Legal status: 501(c)(3) organization
- Headquarters: Staten Island, New York
- President: José Ramírez-Garofalo
- Key people: Arthur Shapiro
- Website: https://www.siprotectors.org/

The Protectors of Pine Oak Woods is an American environmental organization based in Staten Island, New York. Its mission is to preserve and protect the natural areas and open spaces of Staten Island through advocacy, stewardship, and education.

== History ==
The Protectors of Pine Oak Woods (often referred to simply as "Protectors") was established in response to increasing concerns about the rapid development and urbanization of Staten Island in the 1970s. At that time, Staten Island was undergoing significant changes due to its proximity to Manhattan and the construction of the Verrazzano–Narrows Bridge in 1964, which spurred suburban growth. This led to fears of losing valuable green spaces and natural areas, which prompted a group of local environmentalists and community activists to form the Protectors.

The organization's name refers to the organization's original purpose, to advocate for the protection of Pine Oak Woods, now known as Clay Pit Pond State Park Preserve, on Staten Island's South Shore. The early years of the group were focused on raising awareness about the importance of these ecosystems and mobilizing public support for conservation efforts. Early efforts to preserve open space on Staten Island led to co-founder and president Richard Buegler to be awarded SUNY ESF's Feinstone Environmental Award.

=== Preservation of the Greenbelt ===
The group was instrumental in advocating for the protection of the Staten Island Greenbelt, a vast stretch of connected natural areas covering over 2,800 acres in the center of the island. This preservation effort helped safeguard one of the largest continuous areas of forest within New York City, providing habitat for wildlife and recreational opportunities for residents.

=== Establishing Blue Heron Park ===
One of Protectors’ significant accomplishments was the creation of Blue Heron Park. Through lobbying efforts and collaboration with city officials, the organization helped secure funding and public support to convert this area into a city park, which is now a critical wildlife refuge and recreational area for Staten Islanders.

=== Advocacy for Wetland Preservation ===
Protectors has been an advocate for the preservation of Staten Island's wetlands, recognizing their importance in flood control, water purification, and providing essential habitat for local wildlife. The group has opposed development projects that threatened wetlands and worked to ensure that these areas are protected by city and state regulations.

== Partnerships and collaborations ==
Protectors of Pine Oak Woods collaborates with various local, state, and national organizations to advance its conservation goals. Some of its key partners include:

- New York City Department of Parks and Recreation: The organization works closely with the city’s parks department to manage and protect Staten Island’s green spaces.
- The Greenbelt Conservancy: A partner in the ongoing stewardship of the Staten Island Greenbelt.
- NYC Bird Alliance: The Protectors often collaborates with bird conservation groups, including the NYC Bird Alliance, to monitor and protect avian habitats on Staten Island.

== Leadership ==
=== Presidents ===
Presidents of the Protectors of Pine Oak Woods have included:

- 1975–2006 Richard Buegler
- 2006–2012 Hillel Lofaso
- 2012–2024 Clifford Hagen
- 2024–present José Ramírez-Garofalo

=== Directors ===
Directors of the Protectors of Pine Oak Woods have included:

- Arthur Shapiro
- Jack Bolembach
- Lisa Abbot Pillarella
- Mark Latour
- Madeline Paladino
- Alan Benimoff
- Andrew Blancero
- Linda Cohen
- Elaine Croteau
- Dominick Durso
- Kwynn Hogan
- Eileen Monreale
- Jacqueline Perine
- Ellen O'Flaherty Pratt
- Don Recklies
- Herb Smith
- Albert Appleton
- Gordon Davis
- Joseph Fernicola
- Marian Heiskell
- Ralph Lamberti
- Richard Lynch
- Lenore Miller
- Robert Miraldi
- Norma Siebenheller

== See also ==
- Environmental issues in New York City
- Staten Island Greenbelt
- Freshkills Park
- Clay Pit Pond State Park Preserve
- Mount Loretto Unique Area
