= Lake–Tysen House =

Farmhouse in Staten Island, New York

Coordinates: 40°34′19.4″N 74°08′43.5″W

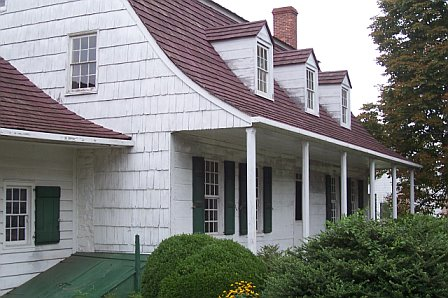
The Lake–Tysen House

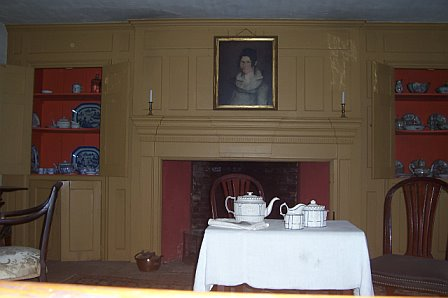

The Lake–Tysen House is a spacious farmhouse with Dutch and Flemish architectural details. It was built by Joseph Guyon on his farmstead in Oakwood, Staten Island, New York, United States. Most of its original interior woodwork, including both Georgian and Federal styles of paneling remains intact. Based on the style and proportions of the house, it would be considered a middle-to-upper-class dwelling. The Lake family owned several slaves, who may have been housed in the rooms above the kitchen. The building was acquired by Historic Richmond Town, a living history museum, in 1962, and transported from Oakwood during July 9–12, 1962. The building was restored before it was opened to the public in October 1963. Full restoration was completed in the 1970s.

== Construction ==
The main portion of the house was built circa 1740, while the kitchen addition was rebuilt circa 1820. The building was constructed from a wood frame, using the bent system. It is one and a half stories tall. There is a cellar under the two main rooms and front hall. The cellar walls are made with rubble stone, while the first floor rooms and front hallways are mud and straw filled with a flaster coat. The flooring, panelling, mouldings, and doors are all pine.

== Original location ==
The Lake–Tysen House originally sat on a plot of 115 acres of land. The original location was 750 feet south of Hylan Boulevard, 100 feet West of Tysens Lane, in Oakwood, Staten Island. This area is significant as it was a large, fertile farm plot which spread from the shore line to road which allowed for two point of transport and trade.

Prior to the Lake–Tysen House at this location, the land was originally patented to Hanse Laurense circa 1677. By 1723, the land was owned by James Hanse Dye. Any structure had been destroyed, but there was evidence found of its existence nearby the kitchen area.

== Museum interpretation ==
The building features several rooms, furnished for interpretation of different time periods that range from the mid-18th century to the late 19th century. When Historic Richmond Town is open with living history demonstrations, the interpretation is mostly daily farm life circa 1820.

== Inhabitants and their occupations ==
1740–1758: Joseph Guyon; farmer
1758–1797: Occupants unknown
1797–1804: Henry Barger; farmer and blacksmith
1804–1813: Barger family; farmer
1813–1839: Daniel Lake family, farmer
1839–1885: David J. and Elizabeth Lake Tysen; farmer, real estate dealer
1885–1932: David J. Tysen II owner; occupied by mother and siblings
1932–1937: John L. (Jack) Porter; restaurateur
1937–1962: Charles Whitaker; real estate agent

== Evidence of slavery ==
Census records taken of the house give evidence of slavery before the full abolition of slavery in New York in 1827 (see History of slavery in New York).

1800 U.S. Census – Southfield (p. 16)
Henry Barregor (Barger)
2 males under 10 1 female 10–16
2 males 10–16 1 female 26–45
1 male 26–45 1 person not taxed
3 slaves

1820 U.S. Census – Southfield (p. 102)
Daniel Lake
3 males under 10 3 females under 10
3 males 10–16 1 female 26–45 2 male 26–45 1 female slave 14–26
2 male slaves under 14

1830 U.S. Census – Southfield
1 male 10–15 1 female 10–15
2 males 15–20 1 female 15–20
1 male 30–40 1 female 20–30
1 male 40–50 1 female 40–50
1 male free colored person 36–55
1 female free colored person 36–55
1 female free colored person 55–100

== See also ==
- Architecture of the United States
  - History of slavery in New York
- List of New York City Designated Landmarks in Staten Island
- National Register of Historic Places listings in Richmond County, New York
