= Clay Pit Ponds State Park Preserve =

Public park in Staten Island, New York

- Location within New York City Location within New York Location within the United States
- Interactive map of Clay Pit Ponds State Park Preserve
- Type: State park
- Location: 83 Nielsen Avenue; Staten Island, New York
- Nearest city: Staten Island, New York
- Coordinates: 40°32′28″N 74°13′48″W
- Area: 265 acres (1.07 km^{2})
- Created: 1977
- Operator: New York State Office of Parks, Recreation and Historic Preservation
- Visitors: 47,415 (in 2021)
- Open: All year
- Website: Clay Pit Ponds State Park Preserve

Clay Pit Ponds State Park Preserve is 265-acre (1.07 km^{2}) state park located near the southwestern shore of Staten Island, New York. It is the only state park located on Staten Island.

== History ==
The park was the site of extensive mining of white kaolin clay in the 19th century that provided the raw material for bricks and terra cotta. After the abandonment of the quarrying operations, rainwater, natural springs, and vegetation filled in the pits. The preserve also contains archaeological evidence of settlements of the Lenape, early European settlers, and the Free Blacks of Sandy Ground.

The park was created in 1977 after extensive lobbying by the Protectors of Pine Oak Woods, a local conservation organization.

Groundbreaking for a $1.3 million nature center was held on May 4, 2007. In October 2008, the center opened with exhibits on the history of the Charleston area and wildlife and plants found within the park. The 3,000-square-foot (280 m^{2}) facility contains exhibit space, classrooms, and an outdoor pavilion.

== Park description ==
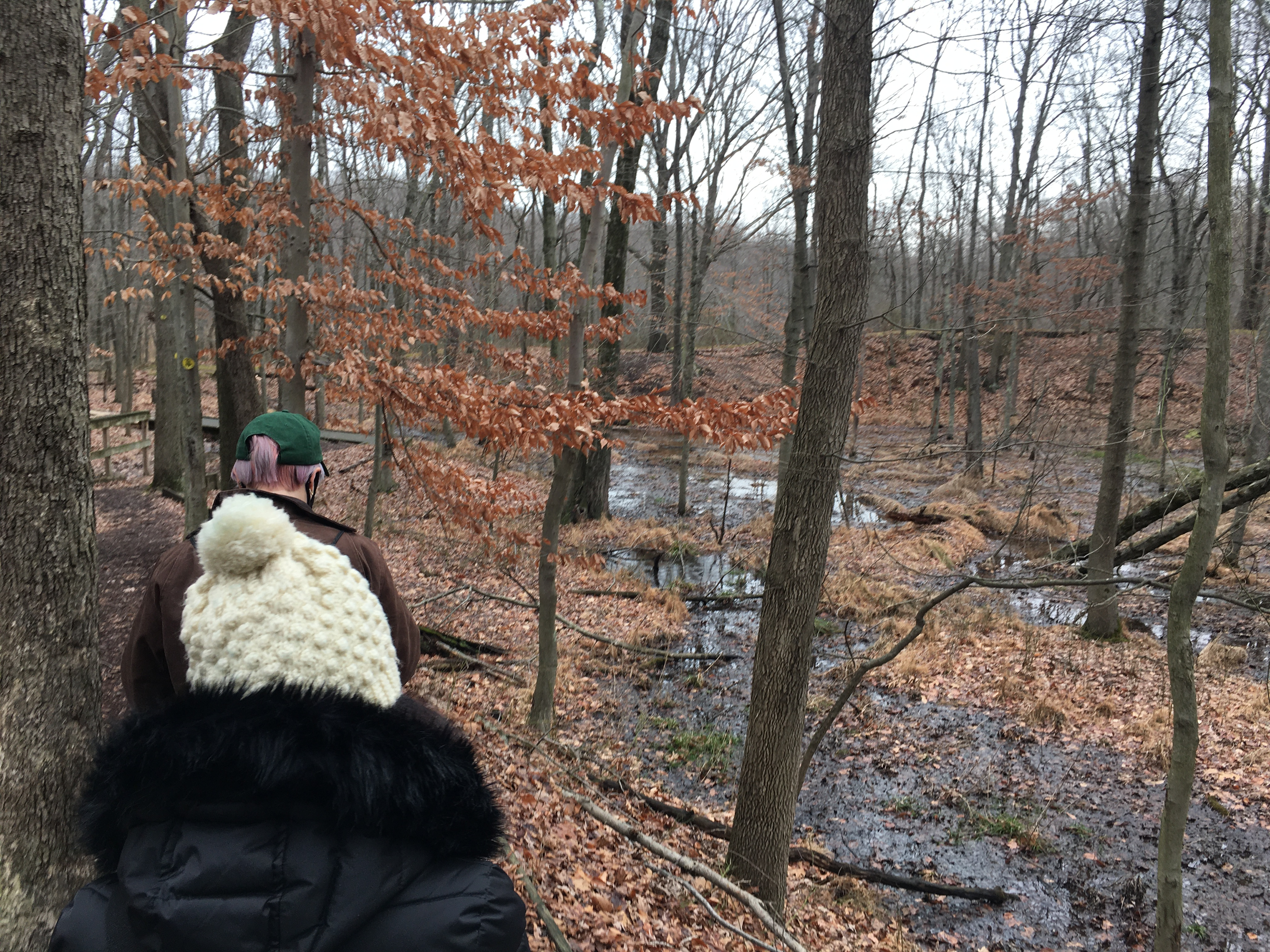
Characteristic park topography and wetlands left over from its prior history, as seen from one of its hiking trails

The park is a 265-acre (1.07 km^{2}) nature preserve, comprising wetlands, ponds, sand barrens, spring-fed streams, and woodlands. It includes pine barrens, and rare wildflowers such as cranberry, lizard-tail, possumhaw, and bog twayblade. The animal species found in the park include northern black racer snakes, box turtles, eastern fence lizards, Fowler's toads, green frogs, and spring peepers. More than 170 bird species have been sighted in the park. White-tailed deer are also regularly seen there.

The purpose of the preserve is to retain the site's unique ecology, as well as to provide educational and recreational opportunities, such a nature walks, pond ecology programs, and birdwatching. Two hiking trails – the Abraham's Pond Trail and the Ellis Swamp Trail – are open to the public near the park headquarters, and horseback riding is permitted on five miles (8.0 km) of bridle paths.

The park has two designated areas, which are set aside for endangered species and are off-limits to the public.

== See also ==
- List of New York state parks
