= William T. Davis =

American entomologist (1862–1945)

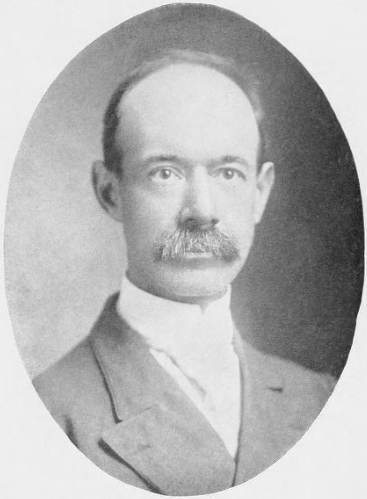
- Born: William Thompson Davis; October 12, 1862; New Brighton, New York, US
- Died: January 22, 1945 (aged 82); Tompkinsville, New York, US
- Occupations: Naturalist, entomologist, historian

William Thompson Davis (October 12, 1862 – January 22, 1945) was an American naturalist, entomologist, and historian especially associated with Staten Island in New York City. He was prominent in the borough's affairs throughout his life.

== Biography ==
Davis was born in New Brighton, Staten Island in 1862. His family history on Staten Island dates back to the 17th century. He was largely self-taught, but nonetheless made huge contributions to the study of Staten Island's community and natural history. Davis wrote a number of books about the history and natural geography of Staten Island. In 1892 he wrote Days Afield on Staten Island, which catalogues the island's plants and animals, while Staten Island and Its People, which he coauthored with Charles W. Leng (1859-1941) in 1930, is one of the greatest accounts of Staten Island history. He was also an entomologist enjoying an international reputation as an expert on cicadas.

He died in Tompkinsville on January 22, 1945.

== Civic affairs ==
In 1881, Davis and Nathaniel Britton, Arthur Hollick, Edward Delevan, and Charles W. Leng founded the Natural Science Association of Staten Island. That organization would later become the Staten Island Institute of Arts & Sciences. Davis was vice-president.

In the 1930s, Davis and Loring McMillen led volunteer preservationists from the Staten Island Historical Society in transforming the former County Clerk's Office and Surrogate's Office at the former county seat of Richmondtown into a museum. That was the beginning of Historic Richmond Town.

Davis was president of the Staten Island Historical Society, and its collections include material relating to Davis, including a straw hat that belonged to him.

== Wildlife refuge ==
A sanctuary was created in a marshy area of New Springville, Staten Island, in 1933 at the urging of Davis. It was maintained by the National Audubon Society and the New York City Parks Department. Enlarged to 260 acres (1.1 km^{2}) in 1956, it was renamed the William T. Davis Wildlife Refuge in his honor.

== Bibliography ==
- Days Afield on Staten Island, 1892
- Homestead Graves, 1889, New Brighton, N.Y.: Natural Science Association (paper on epitaphs)
- Staten Island Names, Ye Olde Names and Nicknames, 1896 (supplemented 1903), New Brighton, N.Y.: Natural Science Association
- North American Cicadas, (reprints from New York Entomological Society Journal, March 1915 - March 1921)
- The Church of St. Andrew, Richmond, Staten Island: its history, vital records, and gravestone inscriptions, with Charles W. Leng and Royden Woodward Vosburgh, 1925, Staten Island Historical Society
- The Conference or Billopp House, 1927, Staten Island Historical Society
- Staten Island and Its People: A History 1609 – 1929, with Charles W. Leng, five volumes, 1930, New York: Lewis Historical Publishing Company
