= Historic Richmond Town =

Museum complex in New York City

Coordinates: 40.571294°N 74.145814°W

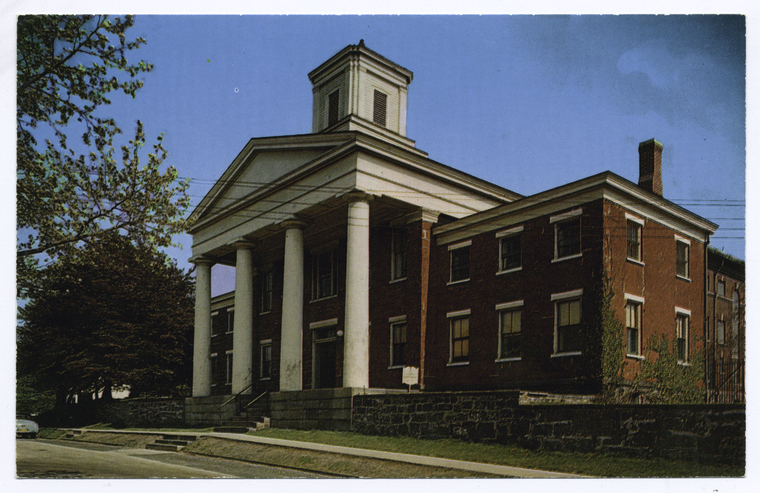
The Third County Courthouse (1837) or former Richmond County Courthouse, on the grounds of Historic Richmond Town

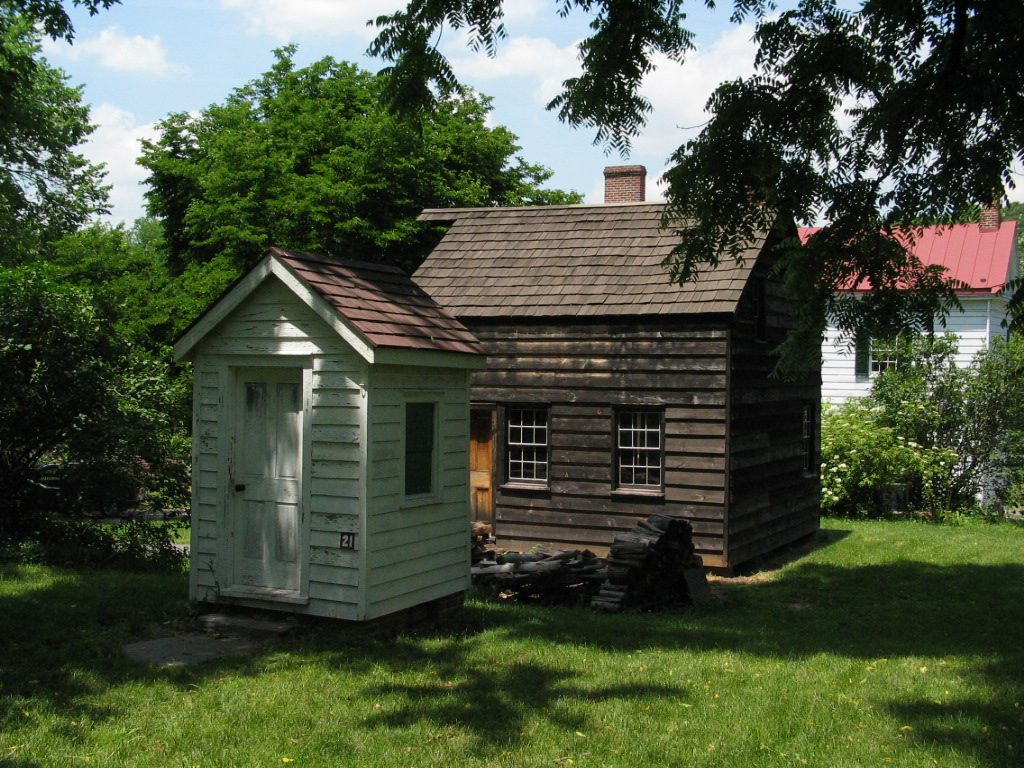
Two restored structures on the grounds of Historic Richmond Town: a relocated c. 1860 outhouse or privy, and a c. 1830–1860 Carpenter Shop reconstruction.

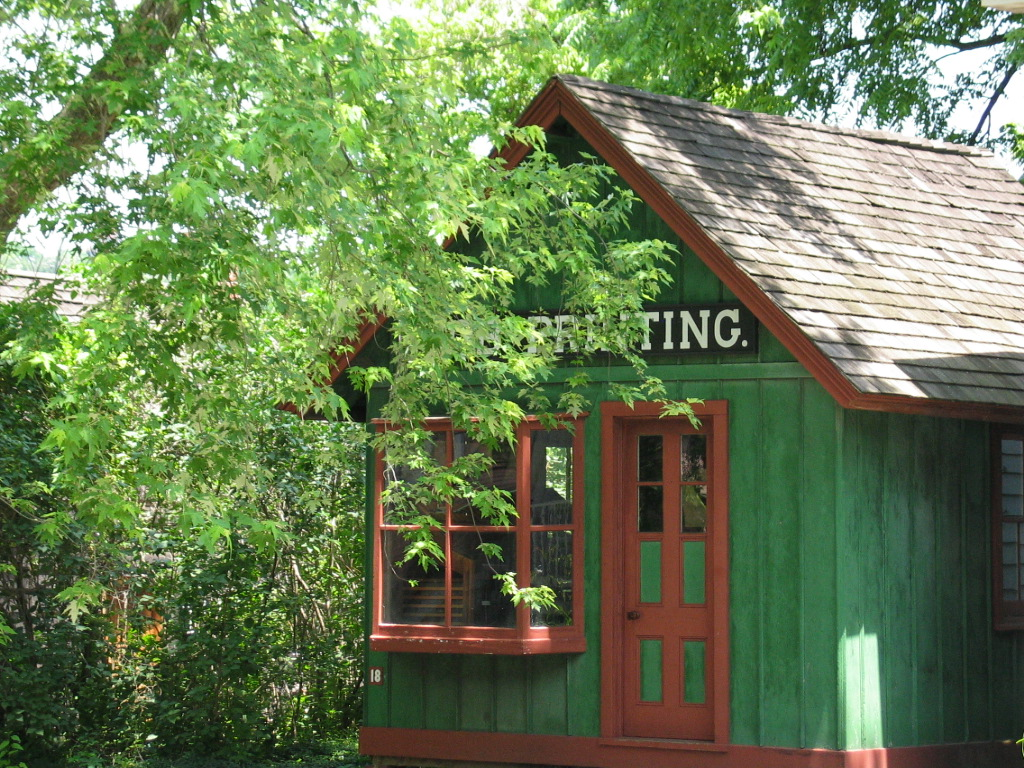
Eltingville Store/Print Shop, c.1860, relocated from Eltingville

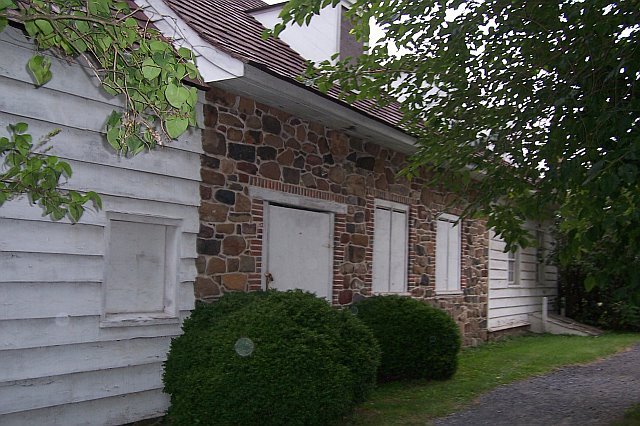
The Britton Cottage, c. 1670 with additions c. 1755, 1765, 1800. Relocated from New Dorp.

Historic Richmond Town is a farm museum complex in the neighborhood of Richmondtown, near the geographical center of Staten Island in New York City, United States. It is centered at the junction of Richmond Road and Arthur Kill Road. The Historic Richmond Town complex is managed by the Staten Island Historical Society.

Historic Richmond Town consists of more than 30 historic buildings and sites dating from the late 17th to the early 20th centuries. Decker Farm, located about one mile from the center of Historic Richmond Town, features a farm stand and seasonal activities such as pumpkin picking. The main site contains other former commercial and government buildings, as well as farm buildings and homes, some of which were relocated from other parts of Staten Island.

The town was named Richmond Town in the early 18th century when it was formerly a county seat and commercial center, having contained the former courthouse of Richmond County, which is coterminous with the borough of Staten Island. People who lived in Richmond Town were mostly of Dutch, English, or French descent, and the most common jobs were those of blacksmiths, shoemakers, and other craftsman types. British troops were stationed in Richmond Town during the American Revolution, and the area was a major stronghold of Loyalist support during the war.

== History ==
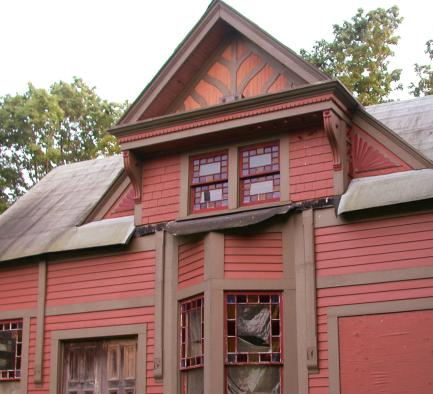
The original New Dorp station building of the Staten Island Railway, which was also relocated from New Dorp.

The creation of the museum site at Historic Richmond Town was the result of efforts by many Staten Islanders, led by local historians and preservationists: Loring McMillen, William T. Davis, and local banker David L. Decker. Fueled by the same Depression-era passion for historic preservation that resulted in the creation of Colonial Williamsburg, these men wanted to create a testament to Staten Island's rich history in an era of rapid development and urban sprawl.

Established in 1958, Historic Richmond Town is a joint project of the Staten Island Historical Society, an independent nonprofit cultural organization, and the City of New York, which owns the land and the buildings and supports part of its operations with public funds from the Department of Cultural Affairs.

On June 30, 2020, the Board of the Staten Island Historical Society elected Laura Gentile as board director and president, selecting a woman to lead the organization for the second time in its 164-year history. The previous woman was Edna Hayes, who served as president from 1978 to 1989.

== Current setting ==
The main campus of Historic Richmond Town occupies 25 acres (100,000 m^{2}) of a 100-acre (0.40 km^{2}) site with 15 restored buildings, offering the opportunity to experience the lifestyle of a 300-year-old community. The two churches located outside the museum site are St. Andrew's Episcopal and St. Patrick's Church. A third church, the Reformed Dutch Church of Richmond, was demolished. Mount Richmond Cemetery, operated by the Hebrew Free Burial Association, is also adjacent to the site.

== Exhibits ==
Guided tours are offered of various homes and shops that are fully furnished and restored to specific periods of interpretation; other buildings are in the process of being restored and are not yet open to the public. While Historic Richmond Town is no longer a year-round living history museum (as it was briefly in the 1980s), demonstrations of historic trades, crafts, and basic household activities by costumed museum interpreters take place during certain special events throughout the year and regularly by reservation for visiting school groups. Special events that are open to the public include Old Home Day (which is the oldest continuous event in the museum's history, and features the most demonstrations of traditional crafts and trades than any of its other events), the Richmond County Fair, Oktoberfest, Egyptian Festival, Greek Festival, quilting classes, Tavern Concerts, Pumpkin Picking at Decker Farm (October), English Country Dancing, Candlelight Tours, Traditional Dinners, and the Summer Apprenticeship Program. Varying from summer to summer, the Apprenticeship Program allows children up to age 15 to learn historic trades such as tinsmithing, blacksmithing, and cooking using original period-specific tools.

The Voorlezer's House, dating to c. 1780, was previously believed to be the oldest standing elementary school in the United States (although this claim was proven to be untrue after further research in 2018). Another exhibit to see is the Guyon-Lake-Tysen House, a Dutch Colonial farmhouse dating to c. 1740. The Christopher House, a restoration-in-progress which dates to c. 1720, features the only functioning jambless fireplace in New York City. Among the many structures are outstanding examples of Dutch Colonial and Greek revival architecture, such as The Stephens-Black House, the John Bennett House, The Britton Cottage, the Crocheron House, the Boehm House, the Basket Maker's House and the Treasure House.

In 1987, the Staten Island Historical Society purchased and relocated the Jacob Crocheron farmhouse (built ca. 1819–1820) to Historic Richmond Town from its original location at 84 Woodrow Road in the Annadale section of Staten Island, a distance of over 3.1 miles. In the process of moving the building, DOT issued the house seven traffic tickets that were later forgiven.

== In popular culture ==
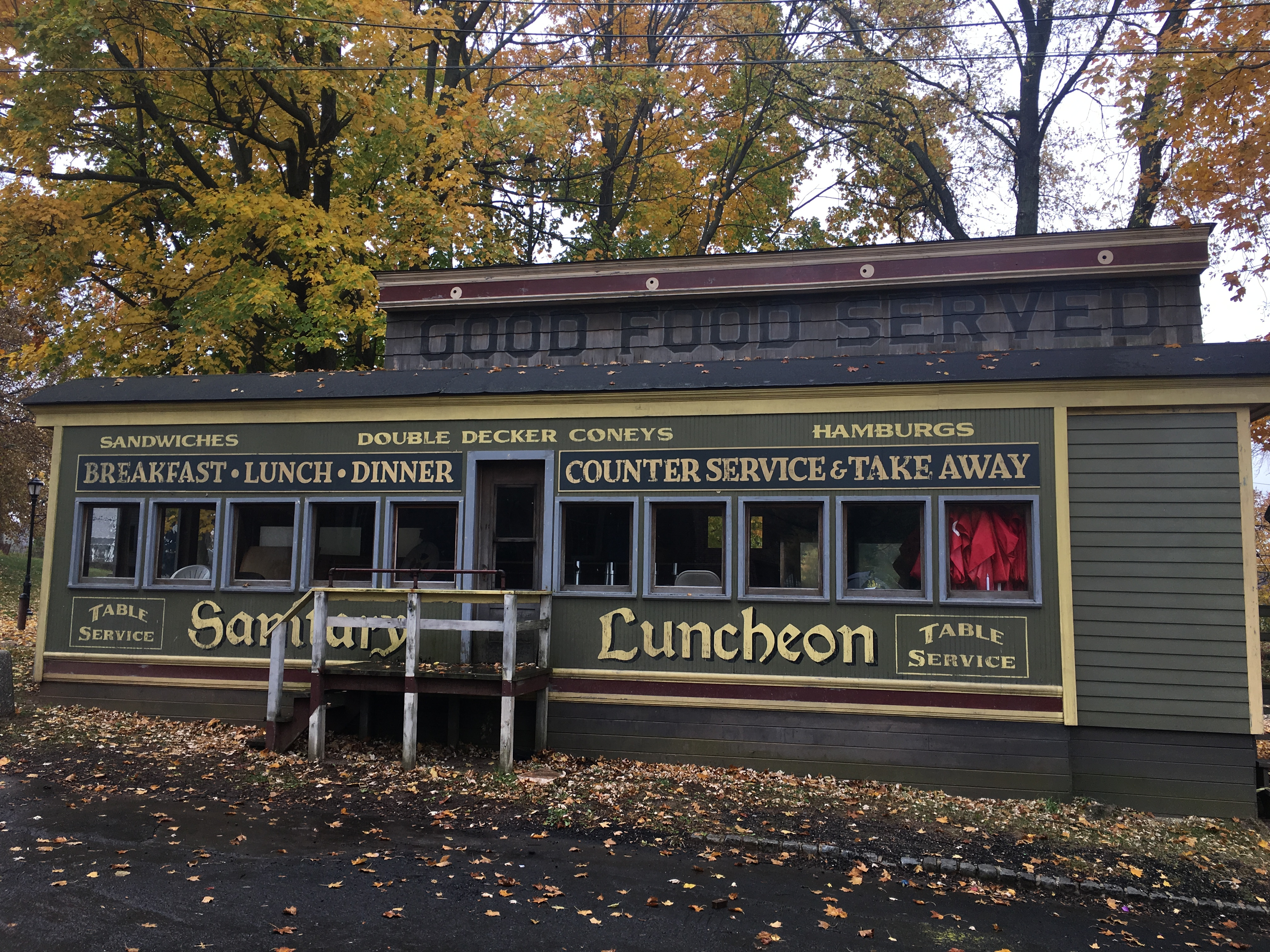
The Boardwalk Empire diner film set, located on Center Street.

Historic Richmond Town is featured prominently in the documentary A Walk Around Staten Island with David Hartman and Barry Lewis, which profiles the history and culture of Staten Island. It premiered on December 3, 2007, on PBS member station WNET.

Historic Richmond Town is featured in the third season of the television series Boardwalk Empire. A 1920s diner and gas station were constructed and shot on location. These sets were shown in the shows third season, which aired in fall of 2012 on HBO.

Historic Richmond Town was featured in the eighth episode of the first season of the PBS television series History Detectives. The episode follows an investigation into the history of a Union flag in the museum's collection that purports to date from the 1860s, and features dramatizations set in the Stephens-Black House with costumed museum staff as actors.

Historic Richmond Town was also featured as a haunted location on the paranormal TV series Most Terrifying Places which aired on the Travel Channel in 2019.

== Access ==
Richmond Town is served by the S74 and S54 buses.

== See also ==
- List of museums and cultural institutions in New York City
- List of Staten Island neighborhoods
