= Third County Courthouse (Staten Island) =

Courthouse in New York City

Coordinates: 40°34′15″N 74°8′44″W

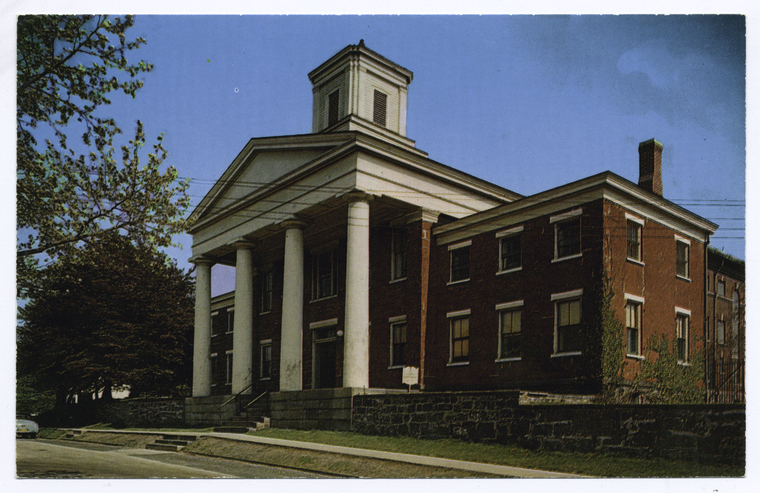
- Third County Courthouse, 2016

General information
- Type: Courthouse
- Architectural style: Greek Revival
- Location: 302 Center Street, Historic Richmond Town, Staten Island, New York
- Completed: 1837
- Opened: 1837
- Closed: 1919

The Third County Courthouse is an 1837 Greek Revival building at 302 Center Street in Historic Richmond Town, near the geographic center of Staten Island, New York. Preceded by two smaller courthouses, it was the Richmond County Courthouse during most of the nineteenth century and was in use until 1919, when it was replaced by the Richmond County Courthouse in St. George.

The building is the oldest extant structure in New York City built primarily as a courthouse. A jail used to be adjacent. The building was the site of the sensational 1844 trial of Polly Bodine, who was accused of murdering her husband's sister and niece and setting fire to their house, a case commented on by Edgar Allan Poe and P. T. Barnum, among others. The packed trial resulted in a hung jury and then an early case of change of venue, first to Manhattan, which resulted in a conviction, later overturned, and then to Newburgh, New York, where Bodine was acquitted.

In 1984, the courthouse reopened with the exhibit Made on Staten Island, which included photographs and artifacts of the borough's history. This exhibit ran until 2026, when it was replaced by an exhibit on slavery.

== See also ==
- List of New York City Designated Landmarks in Staten Island
- National Register of Historic Places listings in Richmond County, New York
