= Staten Island Historical Society =

Staten Island Historical Society is an organization devoted to the history of Staten Island and its neighboring communities, from the colonial period to the present day. The Society operates Historic Richmond Town, the largest and most comprehensive historic village in New York City. It also collects and preserves the materials of everyday life, including the artifacts, archives, and buildings that tell the story; conducts and promotes research based on the museum’s collections; and shares the collection and knowledge with the public through creative and engaging interpretive activities.

The Staten Island Historical Society was founded in 1856. By the mid-20th century, its members had embarked on an ambitious project to collect, preserve, and interpret the material culture of the region. With more than 30 original historic structures on four different sites covering over 100 acres of parkland, Historic Richmond Town is a living history village and museum complex that evokes 350 years of the history and culture of New York City. The Staten Island Historical Society also plays an active role in promoting and assisting research beyond the borders of New York and has supported numerous publications, exhibitions, documentaries, and other humanities projects both within and outside the United States.

Highlights of the Staten Island Historical Society's collections may be viewed through its Online Collections Database.

== See also ==
- Charles W. Leng - Staten Island Borough Historian 1923-1934
- Loring McMillen - Staten Island Borough Historian 1934-1991
- William T. Davis - Staten Island historian
