= St. Patrick's Church (Staten Island) =

Catholic church in Staten Island, New York

Coordinates: 40°34′13.82″N 74°8′36.85″W

Church of Saint Patrick
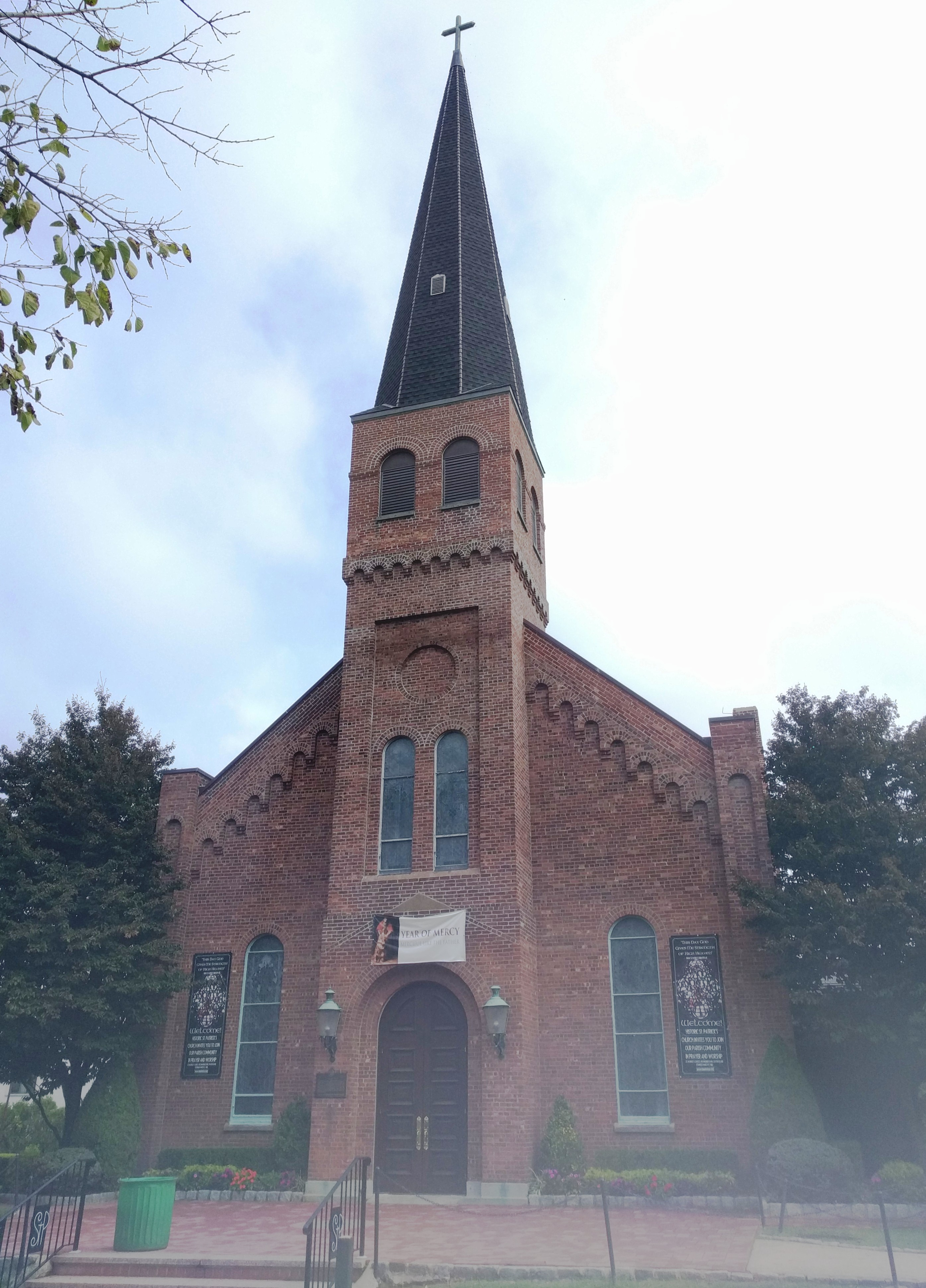
- Interactive map of Church of Saint Patrick
- Location: Staten Island, New York
- Area: Richmondtown
- Built: 1862 (steeple added 1898)
- Architectural style: Early Romanesque Revival-style
- Governing body: Roman Catholic Archdiocese of New York
- Website: https://StPatricksSI.org

New York City Landmark
- Designated: February 20, 1968

The Church of St. Patrick is a parish church under the authority of the Roman Catholic Archdiocese of New York, located in Richmondtown, Staten Island, New York City.

The church was established at the county seat in 1862 as a mission of St. Joseph's, Rossville, becoming the fifth Catholic church on Staten Island. Prior to construction of the church, the Catholic community in the area was served by the founding pastor John Barry, a priest from Rossville, as well as by James Roosevelt Bayley, a future archbishop. The early Romanesque Revival-style building was built in 1862, and a steeple was added in 1898.

St. Patrick's became an independent parish in 1884. During 1914–1922, St. Patrick's established four Staten Island mission churches that grew to become independent parishes: St. Margaret Mary, Our Lady Queen of Peace, St. Clare, and St. Charles. The church was declared an official city landmark by the New York City Landmarks Preservation Commission on February 20, 1968.

== See also ==
- List of New York City Designated Landmarks in Staten Island
