= Charles W. Leng =

American entomologist (1859–1941)

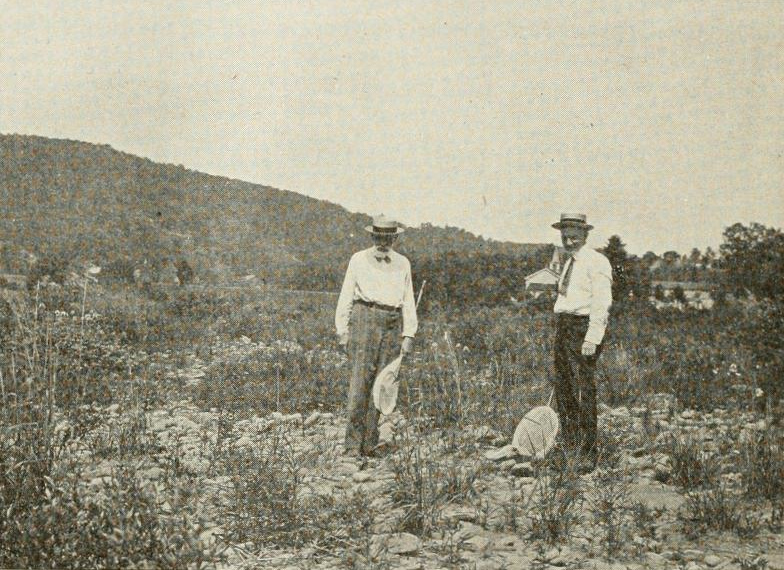
Edward D. Harris and Charles W. Leng at Callicoon, New York

Charles William Leng (6 April 1859 – 24 January 1941) was an American naturalist and historian especially associated with Staten Island, New York, where he was the borough historian from 1923 until the 1930s.

Leng was an internationally known entomologist who co-founded the Staten Island Institute of Arts & Sciences with William T. Davis. He served as director from 1919 until his death on January 24, 1941. Leng is known for his 1920 work on the beetles of the United States of America. He was also co-author with Davis of Staten Island and its People, a comprehensive five-volume history of the island from 1609 to 1929.

Public School 54, in the Willowbrook section of Staten Island, is named after him

== Publications ==
- Willis Stanley Blatchley, Charles William Leng, Rhynchophora or weevils of north eastern America, Indianapolis, The Nature Publishing Company, 1916 - 682 pages Full text
- Catalogue of the Coleoptera of America North of Mexico Mount Vernon, N. Y.: John D. Sherman, Jr. also with Willis Blatchley.
- Charles William Leng, William T. Davis, Staten Island and Its People, Lewis Historical Publishing Company, Inc., 1930

Educational offices
Preceded by	Staten Island Borough Historian; 1923 - 1934	Succeeded by Loring McMillen
