= Loring McMillen =

American historian

- Born: March 10, 1906; Staten Island, New York, U.S.
- Died: March 19, 1991 (aged 85); Staten Island, New York, U.S.

Loring McMillen (March 10, 1906 – March 19, 1991) was an American historian who served as Staten Island's official historian. He preserved the works of Alice Austen and worked to restore Historic Richmond Town.

== Biography ==
He was born in Staten Island on March 10, 1906. He attended Union College in Schenectady, New York, and he took courses in architecture at Columbia University. In 1928 he went to work for Bell Telephone, designing cable tracks and cable conduits until retiring in 1966. He became Staten Island's official historian in 1934. He died on March 19, 1991, in Richmondtown, at age 85. He was succeeded as Staten Island Borough Historian by Richard B. Dickenson.

== Awards ==
- Cornelius Amory Pugsley Local Medal Award from the American Academy for Park and Recreation Administration (1955)

Educational offices
| Preceded by Charles W. Leng | Staten Island Borough Historian; 1923 - 1991 | Succeeded by Richard B. Dickenson |
