= Richmondtown, Staten Island =

Neighborhood in New York City

Coordinates: 40°34′08″N 74°08′02″W

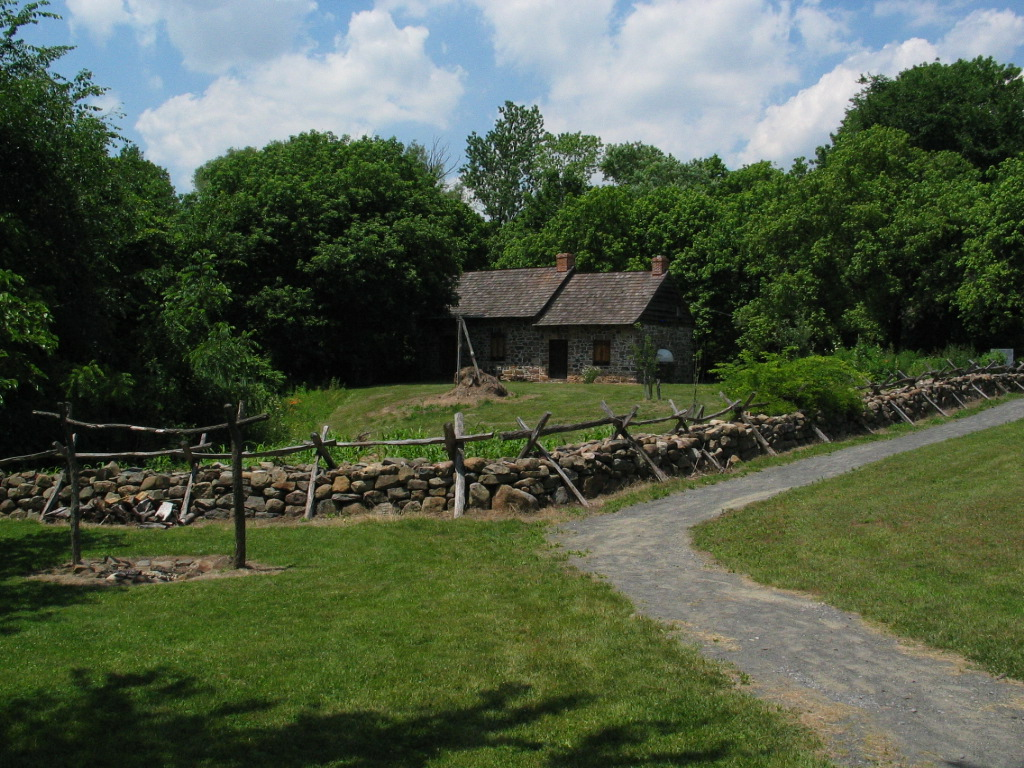
Landscape at Richmondtown neighborhood

Richmondtown is a neighborhood in the Mid-Island section of Staten Island, New York City. It is bounded by Arthur Kill Road on the northwest, Richmond Road on the north, Amboy Road on the east and southeast, and the United Hebrew and Ocean View cemeteries on the southwest.

== Name ==
Originally known as Coccles Town, sometimes Cuckolds Town, because of the abundance of oyster and clam shells found in the waters of the nearby Fresh Kills, Richmondtown gained its present name in 1728 when the village now preserved as Historic Richmond Town was founded. The village became the county seat of Richmond County (with which Staten Island is coterminous) and remained as such until the emergence of St. George soon after the ferries to Manhattan and Brooklyn began to proliferate at the latter site near the end of the 19th century.

== Location ==
Located at the base of Lighthouse Hill with New Dorp and Oakwood to the east, Richmondtown has seen much new home construction since the mid-1960s, and ranks as one of the most popular destinations for families seeking to relocate to Staten Island from New York City's other boroughs, especially Brooklyn.

The town is also home to one of the ten remaining Volunteer Fire Departments in New York City Richmond Engine Company 1, which operates a 2005 American LaFrance Engine purchased through a federal home security grant.

The Church of St. Andrew and Voorlezer's House are listed on the National Register of Historic Places. St. Patrick's Church was declared a New York City Landmark in 1968.

== Demographics ==
For census purposes, the New York City Department of City Planning classifies Richmondtown as part of a larger Neighborhood Tabulation Area called Oakwood-Richmondtown SI0301. This neighborhood had 22,388 inhabitants based on data from the 2020 United States Census. This was an increase of 339 persons (1.5%) from the 22,049 counted in 2010. The neighborhood had a population density of 17.0 inhabitants per acre (14,500/sq mi; 5,600/km2).

The racial makeup of the neighborhood was 72.9% (16,322) White (Non-Hispanic), 2.6% (581) Black (Non-Hispanic), 10.6% (2,366) Asian, 2.7% (596) from some other race or from two or more races. Hispanic or Latino of any race were 11.3% (2,523) of the population.

According to the 2020 United States Census, this area has many cultural communities of over 1,000 inhabitants. These groups are residents who identify as Puerto Rican, Chinese, German, Irish, and Italian.

Most inhabitants are higher-aged adults: 23.1% are between 50–64 years old. 72.4% of the households had at least one family present. Out of the 8,202 households, 51.3% had a married couple (19.9% with a child under 18), 3.9% had a cohabiting couple (1.5% with a child under 18), 16.0% had a single male (1.4% with a child under 18), and 28.8% had a single female (3.8% with a child under 18). 30.3% of households had children. In this neighborhood, 34.3% of non-vacant housing units are renter-occupied.

== Education ==
=== Library ===
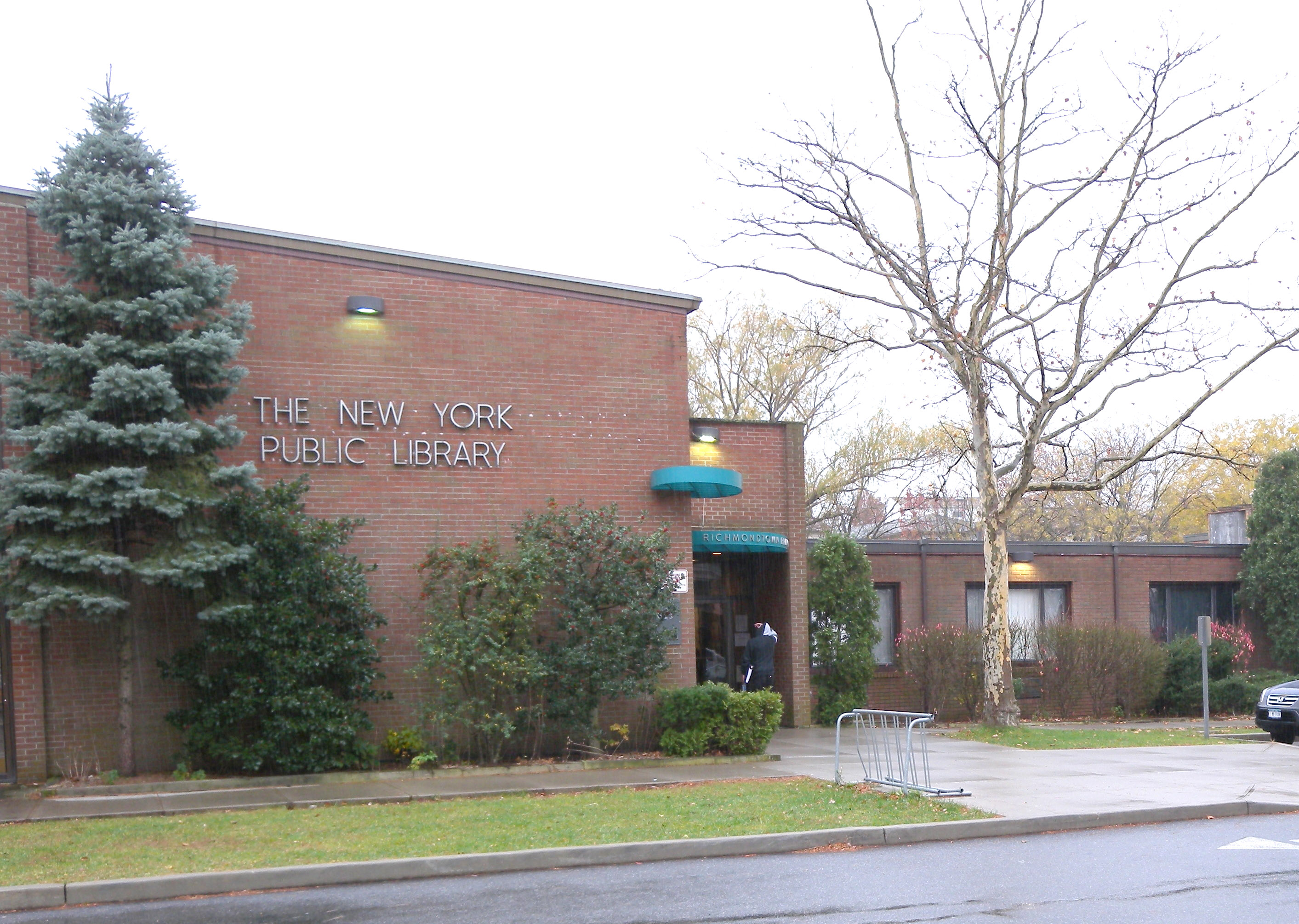
New York Public Library, Richmondtown branch

The New York Public Library (NYPL) operates the Richmondtown branch at 200 Clarke Avenue at Amber Street. It opened in 1996 and contains two floors: a first floor for adults and a second floor for children. In recent years, the Richmondtown Library has been updated to include a TechConnect lab offering"more than 100 technology classes, both online and in-person, at libraries throughout the Bronx, Manhattan, and Staten Island" free of charge.

=== Schools ===
Richmondtown is zoned to one elementary school, PS 23 The Richmondtown School. It is also zoned to middle schools: IS 2 George L. Egbert and IS 24 Myra S. Barnes.

== Transportation ==
Richmondtown is served by the S54, S74, S84 local buses and the SIM15 express bus.

== Notable people ==
Richmondtown is the birthplace of American bare-knuckle boxer Bill Richmond (August 5, 1763 – December 28, 1829) who was born a slave. Richmond went to England in 1777 where he achieved fame and fortune and spent the remainder of his life.
