= National Register of Historic Places listings in Staten Island =

Location of Richmond County in New York

List of the National Register of Historic Places listings in Richmond County, New York.

This is intended to be a complete list of properties and districts listed on the National Register of Historic Places on Staten Island, or in other words in Richmond County, New York, United States. The locations of National Register properties and districts (at least for all showing latitude and longitude coordinates below) may be seen in a map by clicking on "Map of all coordinates".

This National Park Service list is complete through NPS recent listings posted May 1, 2026.

Contents: Counties in New York
Albany (Albany) – Allegany – Bronx – Broome – Cattaraugus – Cayuga – Chautauqua – Chemung – Chenango – Clinton – Columbia – Cortland – Delaware – Dutchess (Poughkeepsie, Rhinebeck) – Erie (Buffalo) – Essex – Franklin – Fulton – Genesee – Greene – Hamilton – Herkimer – Jefferson – Kings – Lewis – Livingston – Madison – Monroe (Rochester) – Montgomery – Nassau – New York (Below 14th Street, 14th to 59th Streets, 59th to 110th Streets, Above 110th Street, Islands) – Niagara (Niagara Falls) – Oneida – Onondaga (Syracuse) – Ontario – Orange – Orleans – Oswego – Otsego – Putnam – Queens – Rensselaer – Richmond – Rockland – St. Lawrence – Saratoga – Schenectady – Schoharie – Schuyler – Seneca – Steuben – Suffolk – Sullivan – Tioga – Tompkins – Ulster – Warren – Washington – Wayne – Westchester (Northern, Southern, New Rochelle, Peekskill, Yonkers) – Wyoming – Yates

== Current listings ==
	Name on the Register	Image	Date listed	Location	City or town	Description
1	Elizabeth Alice Austen House – Clear Comfort	Elizabeth Alice Austen House – Clear Comfort	July 28, 1970 (#70000925)	2 Hylan Boulevard; 40°36′54″N 74°03′49″W	Rosebank	
2	Battery Weed	Battery Weed	January 20, 1972 (#72000908)	Fort Wadsworth Reservation; 40°36′19″N 74°03′17″W	Fort Wadsworth	
3	Billiou-Stillwell-Perine House	Billiou-Stillwell-Perine House	January 1, 1976 (#76001269)	1476 Richmond Rd. 40°35′34″N 74°06′03″W	Dongan Hills	
4	Building at One Pendleton Place	Building at One Pendleton Place	October 20, 2014 (#14000874)	1 Pendleton Place; 40°38′29″N 74°05′32″W	New Brighton	1860 village is rare surviving High Victorian Picturesque structure in New York City
5	Boardman–Mitchell House	Boardman–Mitchell House	January 4, 2012 (#11001004)	710 Bay St. 40°37′29″N 74°04′29″W	Stapleton	
6	Brighton Heights Reformed Church	Brighton Heights Reformed Church	June 3, 1982 (#82003399)	320 St. Mark; 40°38′29″N 74°04′43″W	Brighton Heights	
7	Calvary Presbyterian Church	Calvary Presbyterian Church	November 21, 2002 (#02001356)	909 Castleton Ave. 40°38′06″N 74°06′47″W	West New Brighton	
8	Christ Church New Brighton (Episcopal)	Christ Church New Brighton (Episcopal)	May 27, 2004 (#04000544)	76 Franklin Ave. 40°38′36″N 74°05′36″W	New Brighton	
9	Church of St. Andrew (Episcopal)	Church of St. Andrew (Episcopal)	October 6, 2000 (#82005078)	Arthur Kill and Old Mill Rds. 40°34′22″N 74°08′51″W	Richmondtown	
10	Conference House	Conference House	October 15, 1966 (#66000566)	Hylan Boulevard; 40°30′10″N 74°15′14″W	Tottenville	
11	Edgewater Village Hall and Tappen Park	Edgewater Village Hall and Tappen Park	May 19, 1980 (#80002756)	Bounded by Wright, Water, Bay, and Canal Sts. 40°37′36″N 74°04′40″W	Stapleton	
12	Dr. Samuel MacKenzie Elliott House	Dr. Samuel MacKenzie Elliott House	March 28, 1980 (#80002757)	69 Delafield Pl. 40°38′38″N 74°06′37″W	West New Brighton	
13	Fort Tompkins Quadrangle	Fort Tompkins Quadrangle	July 30, 1974 (#74001300)	Building 137, Fort Wadsworth; 40°36′00″N 74°03′40″W	Fort Wadsworth	
14	Fort Wadsworth	Fort Wadsworth	July 18, 2022 (#99000430)	Gateway NRA; 40°36′18″N 74°03′24″W	Fort Wadsworth	
15	Gardiner-Tyler House	Gardiner-Tyler House	November 23, 1984 (#84000294)	27 Tyler St. 40°37′24″N 74°06′48″W	West New Brighton	
16	Garibaldi Memorial	Garibaldi Memorial	April 17, 1980 (#80002758)	420 Tompkins Ave. 40°36′54″N 74°04′27″W	Rosebank	
17	Hamilton Park Community Houses	Hamilton Park Community Houses	September 26, 1983 (#83003437)	105 Franklin Ave., 66 Harvard Ave., and 32 Park Pl. 40°38′30″N 74°05′27″W	New Brighton	
18	House at 5910 Amboy Road	House at 5910 Amboy Road	December 16, 1982 (#82001263)	5910 Amboy Rd. 40°31′32″N 74°12′17″W	Prince's Bay	
19	Peter Houseman House	Peter Houseman House	October 29, 1982 (#82001261)	308 St. John Ave. 40°36′57″N 74°08′12″W	Westerleigh	
20	Houses at 364 and 390 Van Duzer Street	Houses at 364 and 390 Van Duzer Street	November 14, 1982 (#82001262)	364 and 390 Van Duzer St. 40°37′45″N 74°04′47″W	Stapleton	
21	Immanuel Union Church	Immanuel Union Church	July 27, 2018 (#100002742)	693 Jewett Ave; 40°37′13″N 74°07′52″W	Westerleigh	Church complex built as centerpiece of Prohibition Park in late 19th and early 20th centuries spurred residential development in the neighborhood. Wikidata QQ60030971
22	Jacques Marchais Center of Tibetan Art	Jacques Marchais Center of Tibetan Art	May 29, 2009 (#09000379)	338 Lighthouse Ave. 40°34′35″N 74°08′19″W	Egbertville	Wikidata QQ2740892
23	Kreischer House	Kreischer House	October 29, 1982 (#82001199)	4500 Arthur Kill Rd. 40°31′57″N 74°14′18″W	Charleston	Built about 1885.
24	Kreuzer-Pelton House	Kreuzer-Pelton House	January 29, 1973 (#73001261)	1262 Richmond Ter. 40°38′37″N 74°06′43″W	West New Brighton	
25	LaTourette House	LaTourette House	March 5, 1982 (#82003400)	Richmond Hill; 40°34′34″N 74°08′50″W	New Springville	1836 brick Federal-style building now used as clubhouse for city-owned golf course
26	McFarlane-Bredt House	McFarlane-Bredt House	September 8, 1983 (#83001784)	30 Hylan Boulevard; 40°36′51″N 74°03′51″W	Rosebank	
27	Messiah Lutheran Church		December 16, 2025 (#100012403)	205 Jefferson Boulevard; 40°32′41″N 74°10′54″W		
28	Miller Army Air Field Historic District	Miller Army Air Field Historic District	April 11, 1980 (#80000362)	New Dorp Lane; 40°33′51″N 74°05′44″W	New Dorp Beach	
29	Moore-McMillen House	Moore-McMillen House	April 23, 1980 (#80002760)	3531 Richmond Rd. 40°34′21″N 74°08′21″W	Egbertville	
30	Neville House	Neville House	July 28, 1977 (#77000979)	806 Richmond Terrace; 40°38′40″N 74°05′57″W	New Brighton	
31	New Brighton Village Hall		December 15, 1978 (#78001904)	66 Lafayette Ave. 40°38′35″N 74°05′46″W	New Brighton	
32	New Dorp Light	New Dorp Light	August 28, 1973 (#73001260)	Altamont Ave., Staten Island; 40°34′51″N 74°07′13″W	New Dorp	
33	Office Building and U.S. Light-House Depot Complex	Office Building and U.S. Light-House Depot Complex	September 15, 1983 (#83001785)	1 Bay St. 40°38′28″N 74°04′30″W	St. George	
34	Old Orchard Shoal Light Station	Old Orchard Shoal Light Station	September 20, 2006 (#06000864)	In Lower New York Bay, 3.5 miles south of New Dorp Beach; 40°30′44″N 74°05′56″W	Lower New York Bay	
35	Frederick Law Olmsted Sr. Farmhouse	Frederick Law Olmsted Sr. Farmhouse	December 3, 2020 (#100005846)	4515 Hylan Blvd. 40°31′54″N 74°09′28″W	Annadale	Now known as the Olmsted-Beil House.
36	Our Lady of Mount Carmel Grotto	Our Lady of Mount Carmel Grotto	November 2, 2000 (#00001276)	36 Amity St. 40°36′44″N 74°04′31″W	Rosebank	
37	Poillon-Seguine-Britton House		February 2, 1984 (#84002942)	360 Great Kills Rd. 40°32′44″N 74°08′25″W	Great Kills	
38	Reformed Church on Staten Island	Reformed Church on Staten Island	January 20, 2005 (#04001533)	54 Port Richmond Ave. 40°38′23″N 74°07′58″W	Port Richmond	
39	Richmond Terrace Cemeteries	Richmond Terrace Cemeteries	March 22, 2016 (#16000112)	1562 Richmond Terrace and 25 Van St. 40°38′22″N 74°07′16″W	West New Brighton	Three contiguous cemeteries established between 1802 and 1866 contain graves of many early residents of the Factoryville and West New Brighton neighborhoods
40	Richmond Town Historic District		May 14, 2025 (#100010190)	Arthur Kill Rd, Richmond Rd, Clarke Ave, Center St, St. Patrick's Pl; 40°34′16″N 74°08′45″W	Richmondtown	
41	Sailors' Snug Harbor National Register District	Sailors' Snug Harbor National Register District	March 16, 1972 (#72000909)	Richmond Ter. 40°38′33″N 74°06′10″W	Livingston	
42	St. Paul's Methodist Episcopal Church		December 16, 2025 (#100012404)	7558 Amboy Road; 40°30′32″N 74°14′51″W		
43	Sandy Ground Historic Archeological District		September 23, 1982 (#82003398)	Address Restricted	Sandy Ground	
44	Scott-Edwards House	Scott-Edwards House	February 11, 1983 (#83001786)	752 Delafiel Ave. 40°37′43″N 74°07′26″W	West New Brighton	
45	Seaview Hospital	Seaview Hospital	September 7, 2005 (#05000992)	460 Brielle Ave. 40°35′30″N 74°07′58″W	Willowbrook	
46	Seguine House	Seguine House	May 6, 1980 (#80002761)	440 Seguine Ave. 40°31′00″N 74°11′52″W	Lemon Creek	
47	Silver Lake Cemetery	Silver Lake Cemetery	February 21, 2017 (#100000660)	926 Victory Blvd. 40°37′20″N 74°05′47″W	Silver Lake	
48	St. Alban's Episcopal Church	St. Alban's Episcopal Church	October 29, 1982 (#82001264)	76 St. Alban's Place; 40°32′37″N 74°09′40″W	Eltingville	
49	St. Paul's Memorial Church and Rectory	St. Paul's Memorial Church and Rectory	November 21, 1980 (#80002762)	225 St. Pauls Ave. 40°37′55″N 74°04′46″W	Stapleton	
50	Staten Island Borough Hall and Richmond County Courthouse	Staten Island Borough Hall and Richmond County Courthouse	October 6, 1983 (#83004150)	Richmond Terr. 40°38′33″N 74°04′35″W	St. George	
51	Staten Island Light	Staten Island Light	November 30, 2005 (#05001340)	Southern side of Edinboro Rd., between 402 and 426 Rds. 40°34′34″N 74°08′29″W	Lighthouse Hill	
52	Louis A. and Laura Stirn House	Louis A. and Laura Stirn House	November 12, 2010 (#10000899)	79 Howard Ave. 40°37′43″N 74°05′18″W	Grymes Hill	
53	Sylvan Grove Cemetery	Sylvan Grove Cemetery	August 24, 2015 (#15000540)	Victory Boulevard at Glen St. 40°35′28″N 74°11′31″W	Travis–Chelsea	Established 1795, many people important in developing Staten Island are buried here.
54	Temple Emanu-El	Temple Emanu-El	August 2, 2007 (#07000778)	984 Post Ave. 40°37′56″N 74°08′03″W	Port Richmond	
55	Temple Israel Reform Congregation		February 3, 2025 (#100011421)	315 Forest Ave; 40°37′53″N 74°05′58″W	West New Brighton	
56	Unitarian Church of the Redeemer		January 28, 2026 (#100012674)	312 Fillmore Street; 40°38′36″N 74°05′56″W		
56	Vanderbilt Family Cemetery and Mausoleum	Vanderbilt Family Cemetery and Mausoleum	July 30, 2021 (#100006780)	2205 Richmond Rd. 40°35′04″N 74°07′17″W	New Dorp	
57	Voorlezer's House	Voorlezer's House	October 15, 1966 (#66000565)	Arthur Kill Rd., opposite Center St. 40°34′18″N 74°08′52″W	Richmondtown	
58	Caleb T. Ward Mansion	Caleb T. Ward Mansion	July 26, 1982 (#82003401)	141 Nixon Ave. 40°38′03″N 74°04′53″W	Ward Hill	
59	Ward's Point Conservation Area	Ward's Point Conservation Area	September 29, 1982 (#82003402)	Address Restricted	Tottenville	
60	Wards Point Archeological Site	Wards Point Archeological Site	April 19, 1993 (#93000609)	Address Restricted	Tottenville	
61	West Bank Light Station	West Bank Light Station	January 9, 2007 (#06001230)	In lower New York Bay, 3.3 miles east of New Dorp Beach; 40°32′17″N 74°02′35″W	New Dorp Beach	
62	West Brighton Plaza		November 27, 2024 (#100011081)	Generally, Henderson Ave, Broadway, Castleton Ave, and Alaska Ave; 40°38′09″N 74°07′08″W	West New Brighton	
63	Woodrow Methodist Church	Woodrow Methodist Church	October 29, 1982 (#82001265)	1109 Woodrow Rd. 40°32′35″N 74°12′04″W	Woodrow	

== Former listings ==
	Name on the Register	Image	Date listed	Date removed	Location	City or town	Description
1	STANDARD OIL COMPANY NO. 16 (harbor tug)	STANDARD OIL COMPANY NO. 16 (harbor tug)	November 29, 2001 (#01001321)	June 7, 2024	3001 Richmond Terrace; 40°38′18″N 74°09′35″W	Mariners Harbor	Scrapped in 2021.

== See also ==
- Statewide: National Register of Historic Places listings in New York
- Citywide: Manhattan, Queens, Brooklyn, Bronx
- List of New York City Designated Landmarks in Staten Island
