= Treasure house =

A treasure house may refer to:

- Treasure House (Staten Island) (established in ~1700) in Staten Island, New York City, New York, US
- Shōsōin (established in 756) in Nara, Nara, Japan; contains hundreds of National Treasures of Japan, as well as being designated one itself
- Museum
- Treasure House (album), a 2016 album by London-based alternative rock duo Cat's Eyes
