= Christ Church New Brighton (Episcopal) =

Episcopal church in Staten Island, New York

- U.S. National Register of Historic Places
- New York City Landmark
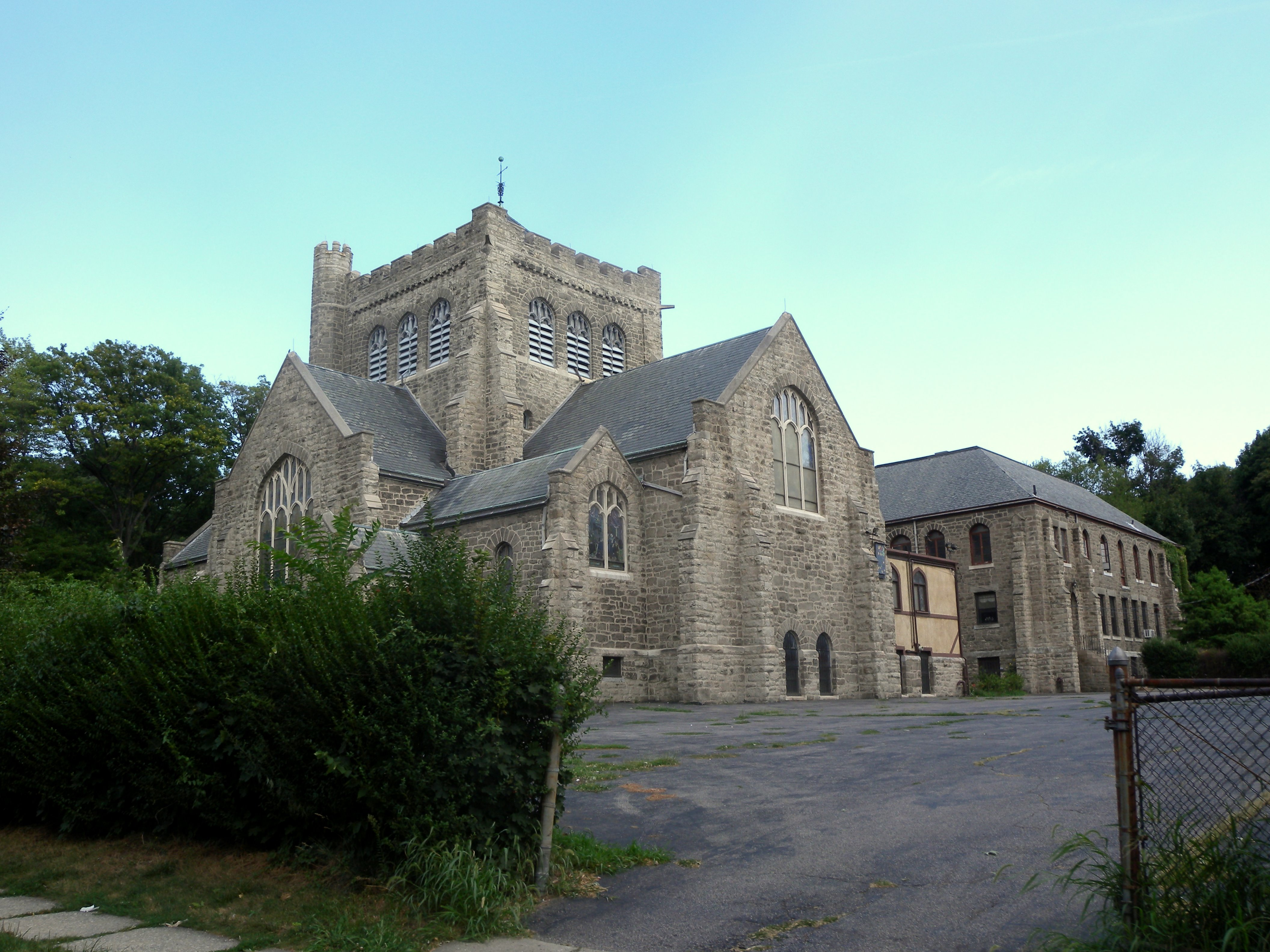
- Christ Church, August 2010

- Location within New York City Location within New York Location within the United States
- Location: 76 Franklin Ave., Staten Island, New York
- Coordinates: 40°38′37″N 74°5′35″W
- Area: 1.5 acres (0.61 ha)
- Built: 1904
- Architect: Purcell, Isaac; Congdon, Henry
- Architectural style: Gothic
- NRHP reference No.: 04000544

Significant dates
- Added to NRHP: May 27, 2004
- Designated NYCL: August 10, 2010

Christ Church New Brighton (Episcopal) is a historic Episcopal church complex at 76 Franklin Avenue in New Brighton, Staten Island, New York. The complex consists of a Late Victorian Gothic church (1904) and parish hall, connected to the church by an enclosed cloister, and a Tudor-style rectory (built 1879 and remodeled in 1909).

The church reported 119 members in 2015 and 42 members in 2023; no membership statistics were reported in 2024 parochial reports. Plate and pledge income reported for the congregation in 2024 was $97,721 with average Sunday attendance (ASA) of 42 persons.

It was added to the National Register of Historic Places in 2004.

== See also ==
- List of New York City Designated Landmarks in Staten Island
- National Register of Historic Places listings in Richmond County, New York
