= Woodrow Methodist Church =

Church in Staten Island, New York

- U.S. National Register of Historic Places
- New York City Landmark
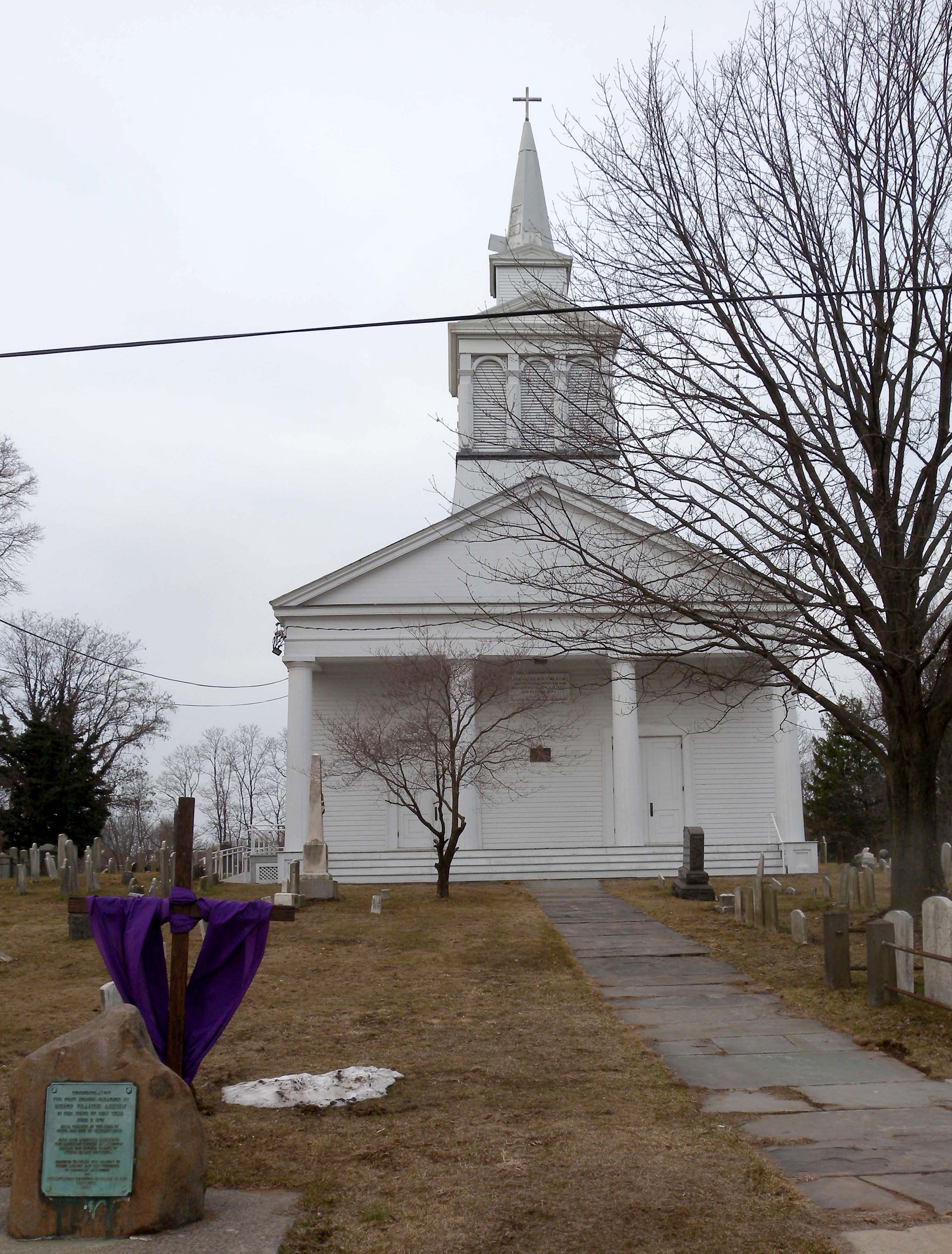
- Woodrow Methodist Church, March 2009

- Location within New York City Location within New York Location within the United States
- Location: 1109 Woodrow Rd., Staten Island, New York
- Coordinates: 40°32′35″N 74°12′6″W
- Area: 2.3 acres (0.93 ha)
- Built: 1842
- Architectural style: Greek Revival, Italianate
- NRHP reference No.: 82001265
- NYCL No.: 0385

Significant dates
- Added to NRHP: October 29, 1982
- Designated NYCL: November 15, 1967

Woodrow Methodist Church is a historic Methodist church at 1109 Woodrow Road in Woodrow, Staten Island, New York. It was built in 1842 and is a wood-frame, clapboard-sided, temple-form Greek Revival style building. It features a portico with four Doric order columns supporting a plain entablature and unadorned pediment. Above the portico is a three-stage, open bell tower and spire in a vernacular Italianate style added in 1876. Also on the property is a two-story clapboard house built about 1850 and expanded in 1860–61.

It was added to the National Register of Historic Places in 1982.

== See also ==
- National Register of Historic Places listings in Richmond County, New York
- List of New York City Designated Landmarks in Staten Island
