= Gardiner-Tyler House =

Historic house in Staten Island, New York

- U.S. National Register of Historic Places
- New York City Landmark
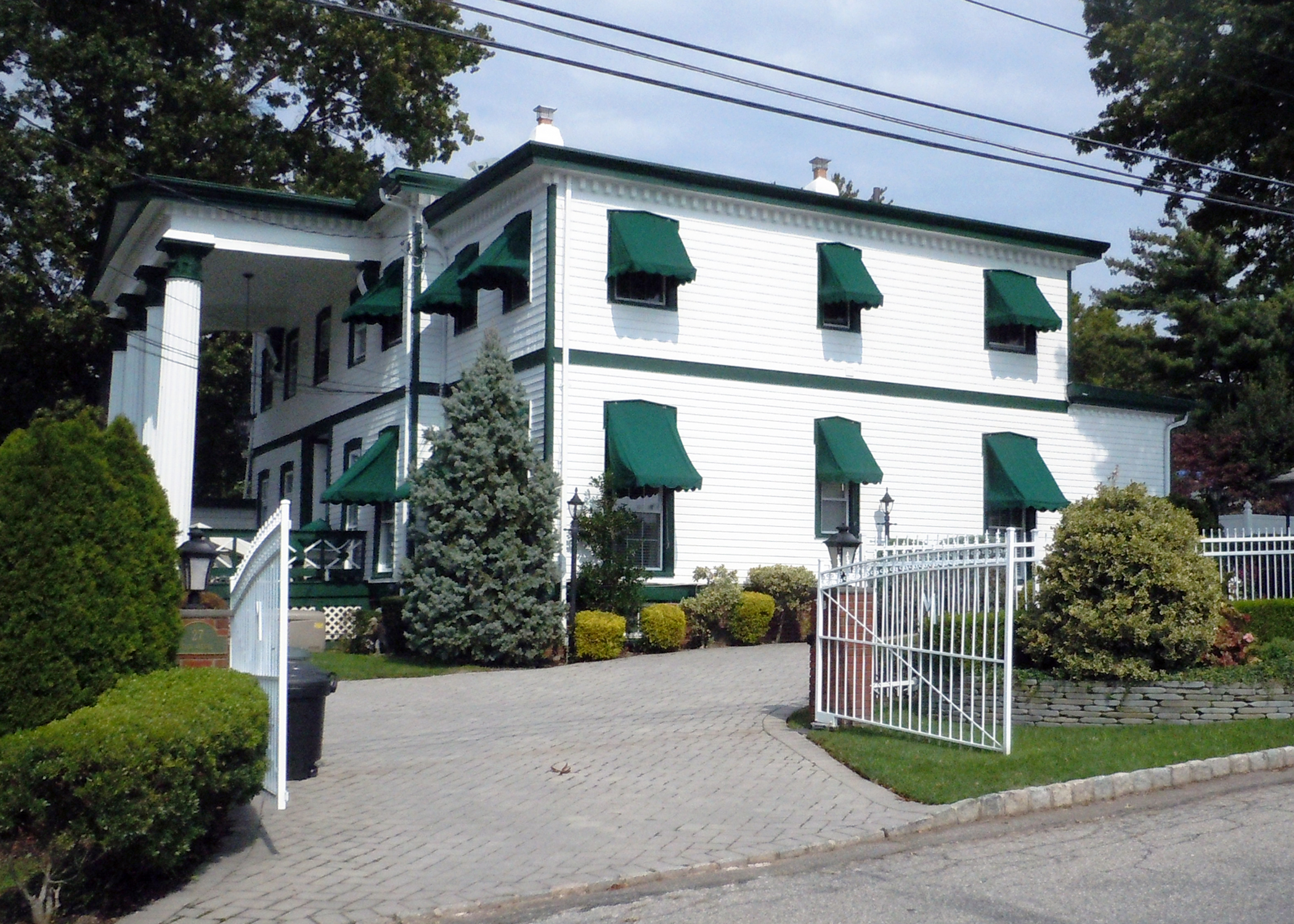
- Gardiner-Tyler House, September 2012

- Location within New York City Location within New York Location within the United States
- Location: 27 Tyler Avenue, Staten Island, New York
- Coordinates: 40°37′24″N 74°6′48″W
- Area: less than one acre
- Built: 1835
- Architectural style: Greek Revival
- NRHP reference No.: 84000294
- NYCL No.: 0344

Significant dates
- Added to NRHP: November 23, 1984
- Designated NYCL: May 12, 1967

Gardiner-Tyler House is a historic home located at West New Brighton, Staten Island, New York. It was built about 1835 and is a two-story, Greek Revival style frame dwelling covered in clapboards. It features a two-story, tetrastyle portico with four fluted Corinthian order columns. The house was the home of Julia Gardiner Tyler (1820-1889), widow of U.S. President John Tyler, from 1868 to 1874.

It was added to the National Register of Historic Places in 1984.

== See also ==
- List of New York City Designated Landmarks in Staten Island
- National Register of Historic Places listings in Richmond County, New York
