= List of New York City Designated Landmarks in Staten Island =

The New York City Landmarks Preservation Commission (LPC), formed in 1965, is the New York City governmental commission that administers the city's Landmarks Preservation Law. Since its founding, it has designated over a thousand landmarks, classified into four categories: individual landmarks, interior landmarks, scenic landmarks, and historic districts.

The New York City borough of Staten Island contains numerous landmarks designated by the LPC, several interior landmarks and historic districts. The following is an incomplete list. Some of these are also National Historic Landmark (NHL) sites, and NHL status is noted where known.

source: ;; date listed is date of designation;

== Historic districts ==
Landmark name	Image	Date listed (Note: The number below each date is the number assigned to each location by the Landmarks Preservation Commission. The landmark designation report can be viewed by clicking the number.) (Note: For an interactive map, refer to "Discover New York City Landmarks". New York City Landmarks Preservation Commission – via ArcGIS.)	Location	Neighborhood	Description
New York City Farm Colony-Seaview Hospital Historic District	New York City Farm Colony-Seaview Hospital Historic District	March 26, 1985 (#1408)	40°35′35″N 74°08′11″W	Willowbrook	A district composed of structures from the New York City Farm Colony, a poorhouse created in 1902, and the Seaview Hospital, a tuberculosis treatment center erected between 1913 and 1938.: The Seaview Hospital complex is also a U.S. historic district.
St. George/New Brighton Historic District		July 19, 1994 (#1883)	40°38′49″N 74°05′05″W	St. George, New Brighton	A collection of Shingle, Colonial Revival and Italianate houses built during the 19th century, facing New York Harbor.
St. Paul's Avenue-Stapleton Heights Historic District		June 22, 2004 (#2147)	40°37′49″N 74°04′54″W	Stapleton Heights	A collection of standalone wood-frame houses from the 19th and 20th centuries in various styles.

== Individual landmarks ==
=== 1-9 ===
Landmark Name	Image	Date Designated
1 Pendleton Place House		March 14, 2006
120th Police Precinct Station House (66th Police Precinct Station House and Headquarters)		June 27, 2000
121 Herberton Avenue House		December 17, 2002
2876 Richmond Terrace House (Stephen D. Barnes House) 40°38′12″N 74°9′22″W		July 13, 1976
29 Cottage Place House 40°38′11″N 74°07′49″W		October 25, 2011
33-37 Belair Road House (Woodland Cottage) 40°36′40″N 74°3′55.7″W		October 12, 1982
364 Van Duzer Street House		December 18, 1973
390 Van Duzer Street House		December 18, 1973
411 Westervelt Avenue House, Horton's Row		September 15, 2009
413 Westervelt Avenue House, Horton's Row		September 15, 2009
415 Westervelt Avenue House, Horton's Row		September 15, 2009
417 Westervelt Avenue House, Horton's Row		September 15, 2009
565 and 569 Bloomingdale Road Cottages		February 1, 2011
5910 Amboy Road (Abraham J. Wood House) 40°31′32″N 74°12′16.5″W		March 19, 1974
710 Bay Street House (Boardman-Mitchell House)		October 12, 1982
92 Harrison Street House 40.6342°N 74.0775°W		June 28, 2016

=== A-M ===
Landmark Name	Image	Date Designated
Aakawaxung Munahanung (Island Protected from the Wind) Archaeological Site 298 Satterlee Street 40.5023°N 74.2516°W		June 22, 2021
Mark W. Allen House, 665 Clove Road 40.6253°N 74.118°W		June 13, 2006
Alice Austen House		November 9, 1971
Asbury Methodist Church, 1970 Richmond Avenue 40°35′58.5″N 74°9′47″W		March 19, 1968
Audre Lorde Residence		June 18, 2019
Basketmaker's Shop (Morgan House), Historic Richmond Town		August 26, 1969
Battery Weed		October 12, 1967
James L. and Lucinda Bedell House		April 12, 2005
Bennett House, Historic Richmond Town		August 26, 1969
Henry Hogg Biddle House		May 1, 1990
Billiou-Stillwell-Perine House		February 28, 1967
Boehm-Frost House, Historic Richmond Town		August 26, 1969
Brighton Heights Reformed Church		October 12, 1967
Brougham Cottage (47-46 Amboy Road)		December 13, 2016
Mary and David Burgher House, William Street		January 12, 2010
Christ Church Complex		August 10, 2010
Christopher House, Historic Richmond Town		December 13, 1967
Church of St. Andrew, Old Mill Rd & Arthur Kill Rd, Historic Richmond Town		November 15, 1967
Reverend Isaac Coleman and Rebecca Gray Coleman House		February 1, 2011
Conference House		February 28, 1967
Cooper's Shop (Egbert-Finley House)		August 26, 1969
County Clerk's and Surrogate's Offices (Museum), Historic Richmond Town		August 26, 1969
The Crimson Beech (Cass House)		August 14, 1990
Cubberly-Britton Cottage		November 9, 1976
George Cunningham Store		July 15, 2008
Curtis High School		October 12, 1982
George William and Anna Curtis House, 234 Bard Avenue		June 28, 2016
Sylvanus Decker Farm, 435 Richmond Hill Rd, Historic Richmond Town		December 13, 1967
John De Groot House		June 28, 2005
Theodore F. and Elizabeth J. De Hart House		May 16, 2006
Frederick Douglass Memorial Park		June 18, 2024
Edgewater Village Hall		July 30, 1968
Edwards-Barton House		June 26, 2001
Dr. Samuel MacKenzie Elliott House, 69 Delafield Pl, West New Brighton		April 12, 1967
John H. and Elizabeth J. Elsworth House		January 13, 2009
Ernest Flagg's Todt Hill Cottages: Bowcot		February 10, 1987
Ernest Flagg's Todt Hill Cottages: McCall's Demonstration House		February 10, 1987
Ernest Flagg's Todt Hill Cottages: Wallcot		February 10, 1987
Fort Tompkins		September 24, 1974
Frederick Law Olmsted House		
Gardiner-Tyler House		May 12, 1967
Garibaldi Memorial		May 25, 1967
Gillett-Tyler House 40.5983°N 74.1056°W		October 30, 2007
Grocery Store (Eltingville Store), Historic Richmond Town 40°34′17″N 74°08′44″W		August 26, 1969
Guyon-Lake-Tysen House, Historic Richmond Town		August 26, 1969
Hamilton Park Cottage		October 13, 1970
Headquarters Troop, 51st Cavalry Brigade Armory		August 10, 2010
Housman House		October 13, 1970
Kreischer House, 4500 Arthur Kill Road		February 20, 1968
Kreischerville Workers' Houses, 71-73 Kreischer Street		July 26, 1994
Kreischerville Workers' Houses, 75-77 Kreischer Street		July 26, 1994
Kreischerville Workers' Houses, 81-83 Kreischer Street		July 26, 1994
Kreischerville Workers' Houses, 85-87 Kreischer Street		July 26, 1994
Kreuzer-Pelton House		August 24, 1967
Latourette House		July 30, 1968
McFarlane-Bredt House (New York Yacht Club)		October 12, 1982
Manee-Seguine Homestead		September 11, 1984
Gustave A. Mayer House		March 21, 1989
Moore-McMillen House (Rectory of the Church of St. Andrew), Historic Richmond Town		August 24, 1967

=== N-Z ===
Landmark Name	Image	Date Designated
Neville House ("Old Stone Jug") or Neville-Tysen House, 806 Richmond Terrace		November 15, 1967
New Dorp Light		November 15, 1967
New York Public Library, Port Richmond Branch		October 13, 1998
New York Public Library, Tottenville Branch		May 16, 1995
Old Administration Building (Third District U.S. Lighthouse Depot) U.S. Coast Guard Station		November 25, 1980
Frederick Law Olmsted House 40.5319°N 74.1581°W		February 25, 1967
Parsonage, The		August 26, 1969
W.S. Pendleton House, 22 Pendleton Pl		March 4, 1969
Poillon House		February 28, 1967
Poillon-Seguine-Britton House		August 25, 1981
Prince's Bay Lighthouse Complex		June 28, 2016
Pritchard House		March 19, 1968
Public School 15 (Daniel D. Tompkins School) (Staten Island Area Office, Office of Building Services, Division of School Facilities, New York City Board of Education)		November 19, 1996
Public School 20 Annex, 160 Heberton Ave		March 22, 1988
Public School 28 (Former), 276 Center St		September 15, 1998
Reformed Church of Huguenot Park		November 20, 1990
Reformed Church on Staten Island, Sunday School Building, and Cemetery		March 23, 2010
H.H. Richardson House		March 30, 2004
Richmond County Courthouse		March 23, 1982
Rossville A.M.E. Zion Church, 584 Bloomingdale Rd		February 1, 2011
Rossville A.M.E. Zion Church Cemetery		April 9, 1985
Rutan-Journeay House, 7647 Amboy Rd		March 24, 2009
Building A, Sailors' Snug Harbor		October 14, 1965
Building B, Sailors' Snug Harbor		October 14, 1965
Building C, Sailors' Snug Harbor		October 14, 1965
Building D, Sailors' Snug Harbor		October 14, 1965
Building E, Sailors' Snug Harbor		October 14, 1965
Chapel, Sailors' Snug Harbor		October 14, 1965
Gatehouse on Richmond Terrace, Sailors' Snug Harbor		May 15, 1973
Iron Fence at Sailors' Snug Harbor		May 15, 1973
St. Alban's Episcopal Church (Church of the Holy Comforter)		September 9, 1980
St. John's Church		February 19, 1974
St. John's Protestant Episcopal Church Rectory, 1333 Bay St		June 28, 2016
St. Patrick's Church		February 20, 1968
St. Paul's Memorial Church and Rectory		July 22, 1975
St. Peter's German Evangelical Church at Kreischerville (Free Magyar Reformed Church), Parish Hall and Rectory		July 26, 1994
August and Augusta Schoverling House, 344 Westervelt Ave		January 30, 2001
Scott-Edwards House		August 24, 1967
Seaman Cottage		December 13, 2005
Seaman's Retreat: Main Building		April 9, 1985
Seaman's Retreat: Physician-in-Chief's Residence		April 9, 1985
Seguine House		May 25, 1967
Sleight Family Graveyard		January 17, 1968
Dorothy Valentine Smith House		October 6, 1987
Standard Varnish Works Factory Office Building, 2589 Richmond Terr		October 30, 2007
Staten Island Borough Hall		March 23, 1982
Staten Island Family Courthouse (Staten Island Children's Courthouse), 100 Richmond Terr		January 30, 2001
Staten Island Lighthouse		January 17, 1968
Staten Island Savings Bank Building		September 19, 2006
Stephens House and General Store, Historic Richmond Town		August 26, 1969
Stephens-Prier House		May 25, 1999
Louis A. and Laura Stirn House, 79 Howard Ave, Grymes Hill		January 30, 2001
Third County Courthouse		August 26, 1969
Tompkinsville (Joseph H. Lyons) Pool 40°38′14″N 74°4′28″W		September 16, 2008
Treasure House, Historic Richmond Town		August 26, 1969
Van Pelt-Rezeau Cemetery, Tysen Ct, Historic Richmond Town		August 26, 1969
John King Vanderbilt House, 1197 Clove Rd 40°37′2″N 74°6′14″W		October 6, 1987
Vanderbilt Mausoleum		April 12, 2016
Vanderzee-Harper House, The, 327 Westervelt Ave		November 17, 2009
Voorlezer's House, Historic Richmond Town		August 26, 1969
Caleb T. Ward Mansion		August 22, 1978
Westfield Township District School No. 5/Public School 1 Annex, Yetman Ave		May 16, 1995
Westfield Township District School No. 7/Public School No. 4, 4210-4212 Arthur Kill Rd 40°32′23″N 74°14′14″W		May 16, 1995
Woodrow Methodist Church		November 15, 1967
Nathaniel J. and Ann C. Wyeth House		May 15, 2007

== Interior Landmarks ==
Landmark Name	Image	Date Designated
Lane Theater, First Floor Interior		November 1, 1988
Sailors' Snug Harbor – Building "C" Interior, First Floor Interior		October 12, 1982
Sailors' Snug Harbor – Chapel, First Floor Interior		October 12, 1982
Tompkinsville (Joseph H. Lyons) Pool Bath House, First Floor Interior		September 16, 2008

== See also ==
- List of New York City Landmarks
- List of New York State Historic Markers in Richmond County, New York
