= Olmsted–Beil House =

House in Staten Island, New York

- Olmsted, Frederick Law, Sr., Farmhouse
- U.S. National Register of Historic Places
- New York City Landmark
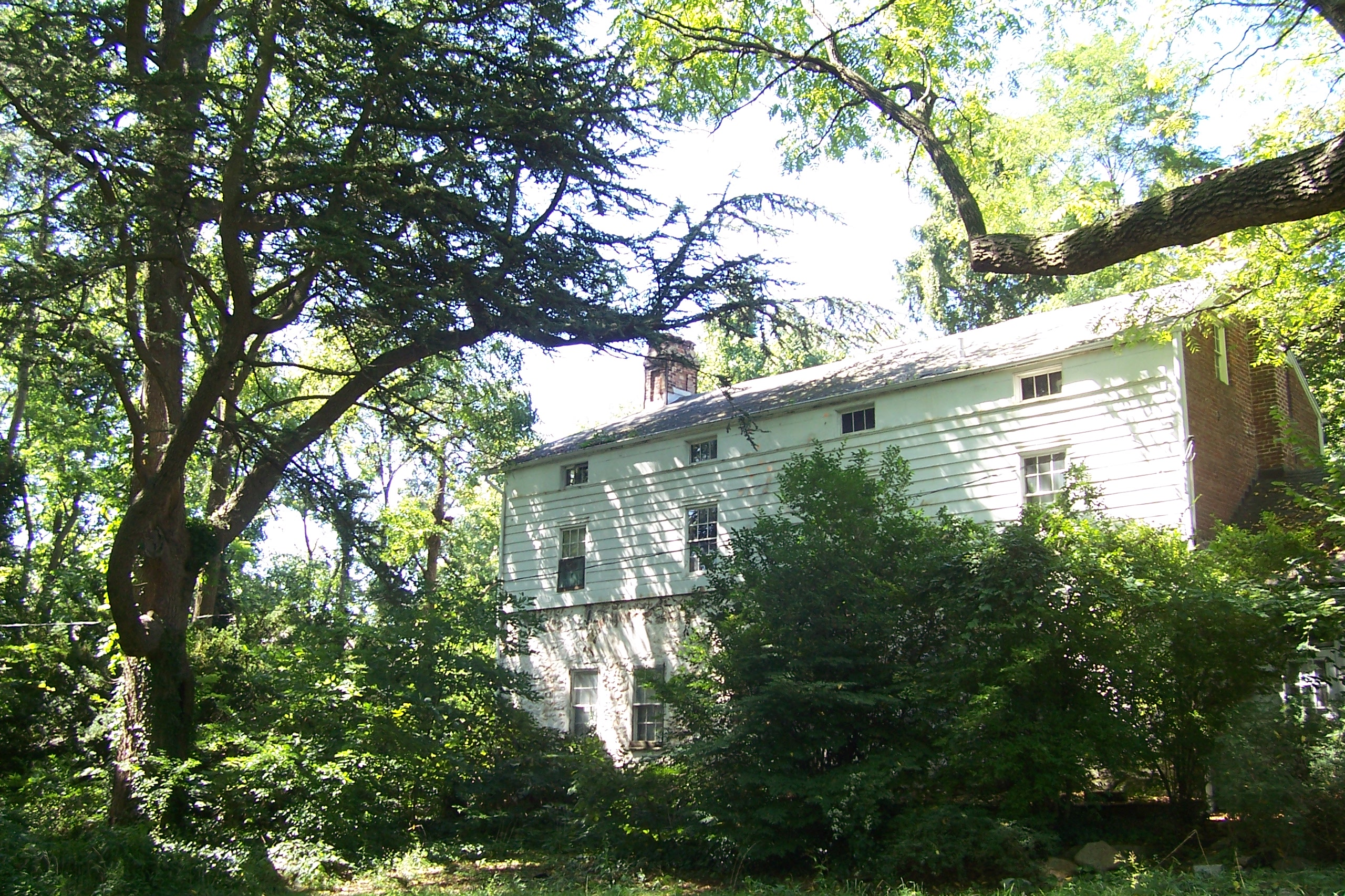
- Olmsted Farmhouse on Staten Island

- Location within New York City Location within New York Location within the United States
- Location: 4515 Hylan Blvd., Staten Island, New York
- Coordinates: 40°31′54.8″N 74°09′29″W
- Area: 1.57 acres (0.64 ha)
- NRHP reference No.: 100005846
- NYCL No.: 0384

Significant dates
- Added to NRHP: December 3, 2020
- Designated NYCL: February 28, 1967

The Olmsted–Beil House is a large farm and modest Dutch colonial farmhouse at 4515 Hylan Boulevard (near Woods of Arden Road) in the South Shore of Staten Island, New York City. The house was purchased by Frederick Law Olmsted's father and given to Olmsted in 1848 to grow crops, plant trees and clear for pasture for livestock. It is on one of the higher hills overlooking Raritan Bay, and Sandy Hook in New Jersey.

== History ==
The first owner of the property was Dominic Petrus Teaschenmaker who acquired a patent on the property from Governor Thomas Dongan on November 3, 1685. The property was acquired in the late 17th century (c. 1696) and the stone basement of the structure was enlarged into a Flemish Style farm house by Jacques Poillon, the Richmond County Road Commissioner under Governor Slaughter, and one of the original Huguenot settlers of Staten Island. By 1723, three generations of the Poillon family had lived in this farmhouse and during the Revolutionary War, John Poillon, a member of the Committee of Safety for Richmond County, helped bring about the famous, though ill-fated, Peace Conference at Bentley Manor in the Billopp House, now known as the Conference House.

Dr. Samuel Akerly, one of the founders of the New York Institute for the Blind, enlarged the farmhouse to thirteen rooms. He wrote many essays on the use of farmland on Staten Island and revolutionized the uses of farming equipment and the rotation of crops. The New York City Department of Parks and Recreation is in the process of restoring the farmhouse back to the way Olmsted had it when he resided there.

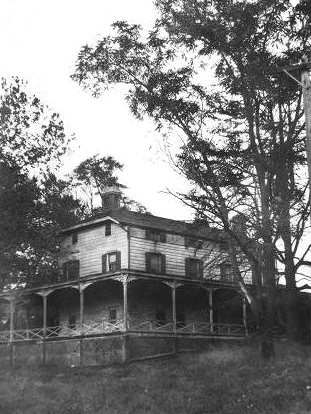
Olmsted Farmhouse with porches in 1924

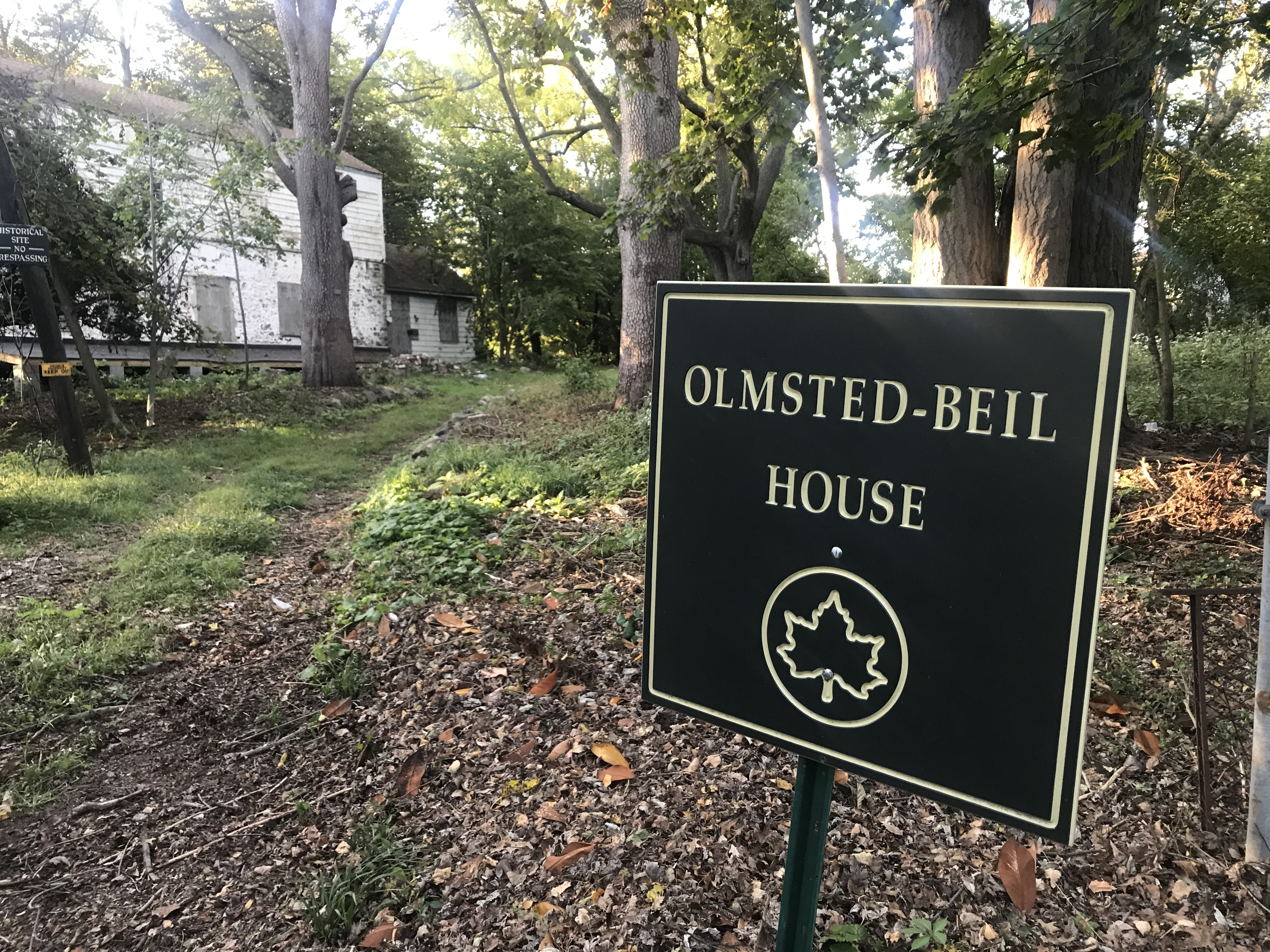
2020

Olmsted renamed the farmhouse, Tosomock, to honor its first owner, Teaschenmaker. Olmsted had greatly improved the structure by adding a 1 1/2-story addition to the top of the house, with small windows on the top floor under the roof attic eaves. He also added porches on all three sides of the farmhouse, which have since been demolished. Olmsted used the property as a tree nursery and planted many unusual specimens of trees on his farm. In the photo you see one of the tremendous Cedar of Lebanon conifers. There are some Osage Orange trees not far from the property as well. The farm originally encompassed land across the main thoroughfare now called Hylan Boulevard, between that road and the beach. After Olmsted sold the farm, it was referred to as the Woods of Arden. The last private owners, the Beil family, sold the house to the city in 2006.

The house was named a New York City designated landmark in 1967. It has since fallen in disrepair. Renovations and repairs cannot be completed until preservation funds have been raised. It was listed on the National Register of Historic Places in 2020.

== See also ==
- List of New York City Designated Landmarks in Staten Island
- National Register of Historic Places listings in Richmond County, New York

== Sources ==
- Poillon-Akerly-Olmsted House - Neighborhood Preservation Center, New York, New York
- Wood Roper, Laura (1974), FLO: A Biography of Frederick Law Olmsted, Johns Hopkins University Press. ISBN 0-8018-1508-8, ISBN 978-0-8018-1508-9
