= West New Brighton, Staten Island =

Neighborhood in New York City

West New Brighton
- Neighborhood of Staten Island
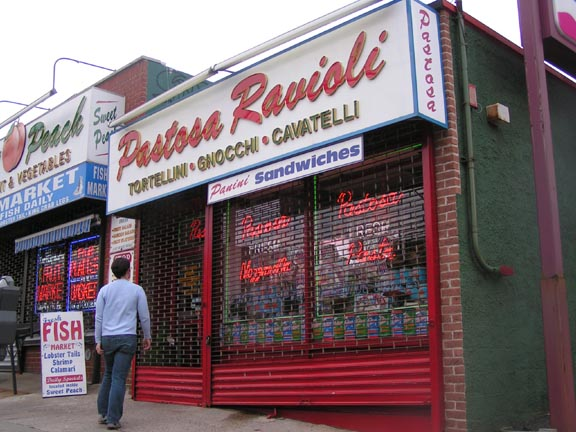
- A ravioli shop on Forest Avenue in West New Brighton.
- Nickname: West Brighton
- Location within New York City
- Coordinates: 40.635°N 74.112°W
- Country: United States
- State: New York
- City: New York City
- Borough: Staten Island
- Community District: Staten Island 1

Area
  - Total: 1.318 sq mi (3.41 km^{2})

Population (2020)
  - Total: 37,010
  - Density: 28,080/sq mi (10,840/km^{2})

Economics
  - Median income: $74,062
- ZIP Codes: 10310
- Area code: 718, 347, 929, and 917

West New Brighton (also called West Brighton) is a neighborhood of Staten Island, New York City, situated in the central area of North Shore. The neighborhood is bordered by New Brighton to the east, Port Richmond to the west, the waters of the Kill Van Kull to the north, and the communities of Sunnyside and Castleton Corners to the south.

West New Brighton is part of Staten Island Community District 1 and its ZIP Code is 10310. West New Brighton is patrolled by the 120th Precinct of the New York City Police Department.

== History ==
Originally known as "Factoryville," Islanders now commonly refer to the area as West Brighton. Some parts of the neighborhood closer to the shoreline are referred to as "Livingston" and "Randall Manor". This area of Staten Island was originally settled by the Dutch in the 1600s, who were then followed by English settlers. During the American Revolution residents of West Brighton overtly remained loyal to the Crown. Successive waves of immigrants to the US then led to the area becoming populated by the Irish. Today, the neighborhood consists mostly of Irish followed by Germans, Italians, African Americans, and Hispanics.

1874 Beers map

The oldest continually operating cricket club in the US was established in West Brighton in 1872, at the site now operated as Walker Park. The Staten Island Cricket Club still has matches there. This is also the site of the first lawn tennis court in the US, built in 1873.

The neighborhood was transformed in the years following World War II. Two large public housing developments were built. The first, the Markham Homes, was originally built to house the families of shipyard & defense workers. The West Brighton Houses followed. Starting in 2004 tenants in The Markham Homes were evicted, so the site might be redeveloped. As of 2007 all tenants had been relocated. While claims had been made that many residents would be able to return into the redeveloped area, few have been able to.

Since the late 90s the area has seen a reduction in some crime rates. Richmond Terrace, which is the main thoroughfare along the Kill Van Kull waterfront, is home to several shipyards and tugboat companies. The area south of Forest Avenue, continues to be home to some of West Brighton's more affluent residents including politicians, lawyers, judges and professionals (particularly in the "Sunset Hill" portion east of Broadway). As of 2014 it was the highest earning census tract on Staten Island.

Politically, West Brighton has been described as a "swing neighborhood" for the borough. With a diverse and representative population, congressional candidates who win the neighborhood tend to also win the borough election.

== Demographics ==
For census purposes, the New York City Department of City Planning classifies West New Brighton as part of a larger Neighborhood Tabulation Area called West New Brighton-Silver Lake-Grymes Hill SI0104]. This designated neighborhood had 37,010 inhabitants based on data from the 2020 United States Census. This was an increase of 1,526 persons (4.3%) from the 35,484 counted in 2010. The neighborhood had a population density of 18.6 inhabitants per acre (14,500/sq mi; 5,600/km^{2}).

The racial makeup of the neighborhood was 45.0% (16,673) White (Non-Hispanic), 16.5% (6,116) Black (Non-Hispanic), 8.0% (2,975) Asian, and 4% (1,475) from two or more races. Hispanic or Latino of any race were 26.4% (9,771) of the population.

According to the 2020 United States Census, this area has many cultural communities of over 1,000 inhabitants. This include residents who identify as Mexican, Puerto Rican, English, German, Irish, Italian, Polish, African-American, and Chinese.

The largest age group was people 10-34 years old, which made up 33.8% of the residents. 66.5% of the households had at least one family present. Out of the 13,141 households, 41.9% had a married couple (18.1% with a child under 18), 5.7% had a cohabiting couple (2.1% with a child under 18), 19.6% had a single male (1.7% with a child under 18), and 32.8% had a single female (2.0% with a child under 18). 32.9% of households had children under 18. In this neighborhood, 47.4% of non-vacant housing units are renter-occupied.

The entirety of Community District 1, which comprises Tompkinsville and other neighborhoods on the North Shore, had 181,484 inhabitants as of NYC Health's 2018 Community Health Profile, with an average life expectancy of 79.0 years. This is lower than the median life expectancy of 81.2 for all New York City neighborhoods. Most inhabitants are youth and middle-aged adults: 24% are between the ages of between 0–17, 27% between 25 and 44, and 26% between 45 and 64. The ratio of college-aged and elderly residents was lower, at 10% and 13% respectively.

As of 2017, the median household income in Community District 1 was $48,018. In 2018, an estimated 21% of Tompkinsville and the North Shore residents lived in poverty, compared to 17% in all of Staten Island and 20% in all of New York City. One in fourteen residents (7%) were unemployed, compared to 6% in Staten Island and 9% in New York City. Rent burden, or the percentage of residents who have difficulty paying their rent, is 51% in Tompkinsville and the North Shore, compared to the boroughwide and citywide rates of 49% and 51% respectively. Based on this calculation, as of 2018, Stapleton and the North Shore are considered high-income relative to the rest of the city and not gentrifying.

== Landmarks ==
Notable landmarks include the Staten Island Zoo, and Clove Lakes Park and Silver Lake Park along the neighborhood's boundaries. Snug Harbor is also located in nearby Livingston. It holds baseball fields, a children's museum, a Chinese garden, botanical gardens, the Art Lab and the Staten Island Conservatory of Music. St. Peter's Cemetery, which is still properly maintained and is the oldest Roman Catholic cemetery on Staten Island (opened in 1848), is also located here, along with several small abandoned cemeteries in which members of some of the island's founding families are interred.

The former St. Vincent's Medical Center, now known as Richmond University Medical Center is located in West Brighton. While most of the buildings on the RUMC campus date from the late 1960s or more recent, the Garner Mansion goes back to the 19th Century. It at one time was used for the St. Austin's Military School, now defunct.

The Michael J. Mahoney playground is a reminder of a small dose of American History. A son of New York City, and West Brighton, he went off with the US Marines to fight in World War I. He fought in 5 major battles in 1918. Mahoney along with many other Marines, was killed charging up Blanc Mont Ridge, France into the German Maxim machine guns. It is considered by many historians to be the real breaking point of the Germans defensive line before the German homeland. His body was repatriated from his burial plot amongst the thousands of Americans Marines and soldiers buried in World War I memorial cemeteries in France in 1924. His grave is located in St. Peters Cemetery in the family plot. The playground was dedicated in 1940 by the City of New York.

The Calvary Presbyterian Church, Dr. Samuel MacKenzie Elliott House, Gardiner-Tyler House, Kreuzer-Pelton House, and Scott-Edwards House are listed on the National Register of Historic Places.

== Police and fire ==
West New Brighton and the North Shore are patrolled by the 120th Precinct of the NYPD, located at 78 Richmond Terrace. The 120th Precinct ranked 12th safest out of 69 patrol areas for per-capita crime in 2010.

The 120th Precinct has a lower crime rate than in the 1990s, with crimes across all categories having decreased by 83.3% between 1990 and 2022. The precinct reported seven murders, 14 rapes, 118 robberies, 384 felony assaults, 124 burglaries, 338 grand larcenies, and 136 grand larcenies auto in 2022.

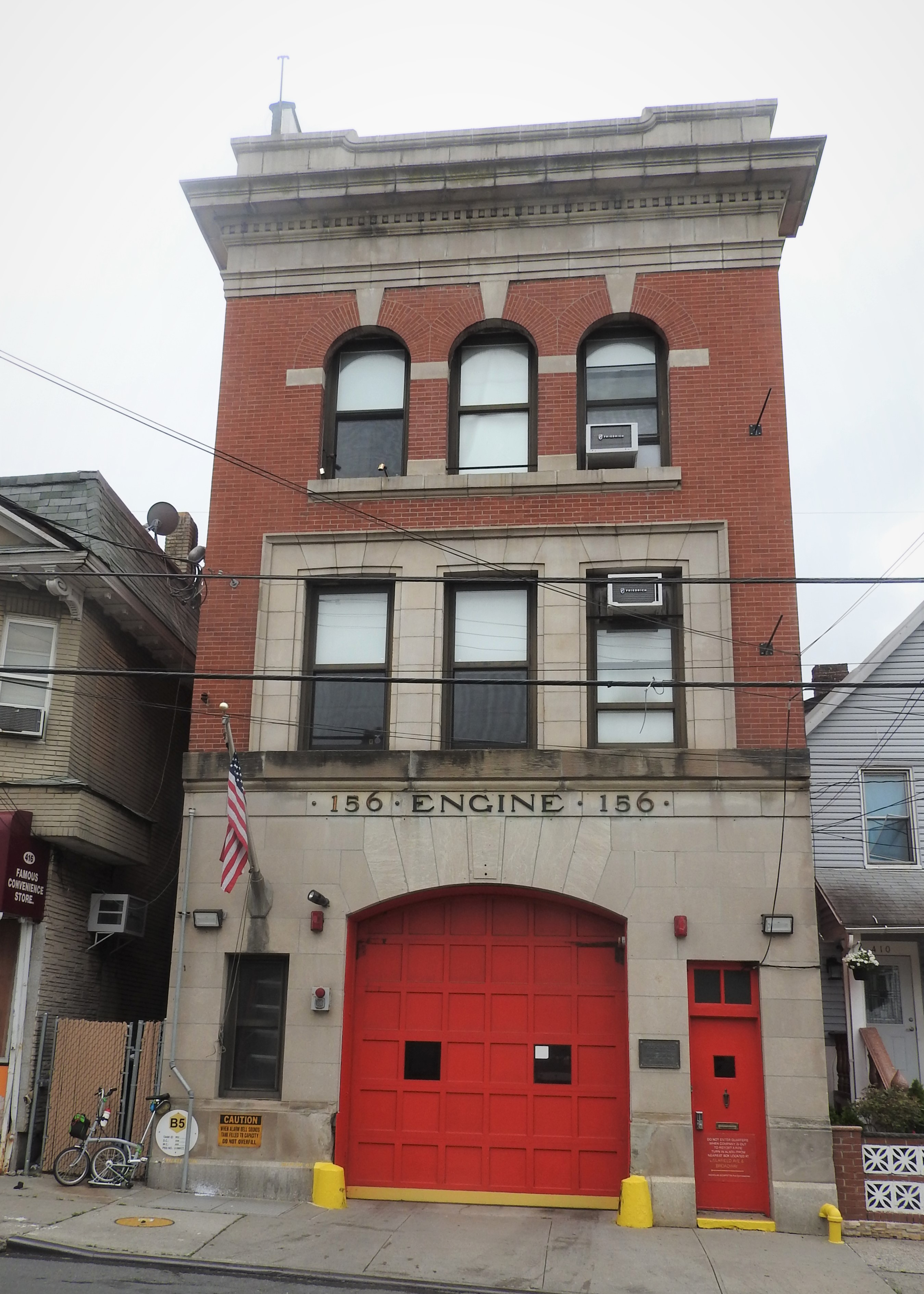
Engine 156

West New Brighton is served by the New York City Fire Department (FDNY)'s Engine Co. 156, located at 412 Broadway, and Ladder Co. 79/Battalion 22, located at 1189 Castleton Avenue.

== Post office and ZIP Code ==
West New Brighton is located within the ZIP Codes 10310 and 10301. The United States Postal Service operates the West New Brighton Station at 1015 Castleton Avenue.

== Education ==
=== Schools ===
The New York City Department of Education operates the following public schools near West New Brighton:

- PS 18 John G Whittier (grades PK-5)
- IS 27 Anning S Prall (grades 6–8)
- PS 45 John Tyler (grades PK-5)

=== Library ===
The New York Public Library (NYPL)'s West New Brighton branch is located at 976 Castleton Avenue. When the branch opened in 1913, it was a sub-branch of the NYPL. The West New Brighton moved to a second location in 1918, and then to its present site in 1933.

== Transportation ==
West New Brighton was served by the West New Brighton station of the Staten Island Railway's North Shore Branch until March 31, 1953. As of 2021, West New Brighton is served by the S40, S44, S46, S48, S53, S54, S90, S94, S96 and S98 local buses and the SIM30 express bus.

== Notable residents ==
- Anna Leonowens, Anglo-Indian writer and educator known for being governess for the King of Siam which she chronicled while on Staten Island in The English Governess at the Siamese Court (1870) and was later made into the musical The King and I. She operated a school for girls and lived on Tompkins Place.
- Debi Rose, City Councilwoman who was born and raised in the neighborhood.
- Jeremiah O'Donovan Rossa, Irish Fenian Leader lived at 194 Richmond Terrace.
