= Treasure House (Staten Island) =

Building in Staten Island, New York

Coordinates: 40°34′19.4″N 74°08′49.8″W

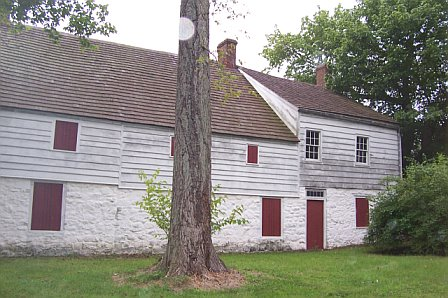
The Treasure House

The Treasure House is a historic building located in the Richmondtown neighborhood of Staten Island in New York City, New York, U.S. Samuel Grasset, a tanner and leather worker, built the original construction in approximately 1700. Additions were made in 1740, 1790 and 1860. Subsequent owners of the house in subsequent centuries include a cord wainer (shoemaker), innkeeper, stonemason, and coach trimmer. A number of local businesses have also occupied the structure. The house was named after a legend that a cache of American Revolutionary War era gold coins was discovered during renovation in about 1860.

== See also ==
- List of New York City Designated Landmarks in Staten Island
- National Register of Historic Places listings in Richmond County, New York

== Sources ==
- Neighborhood Preservation Center, New York, New York
