= One Pendleton Place =

Historic house in Staten Island, New York

- Building at One Pendleton Place
- U.S. National Register of Historic Places
- New York City Landmark
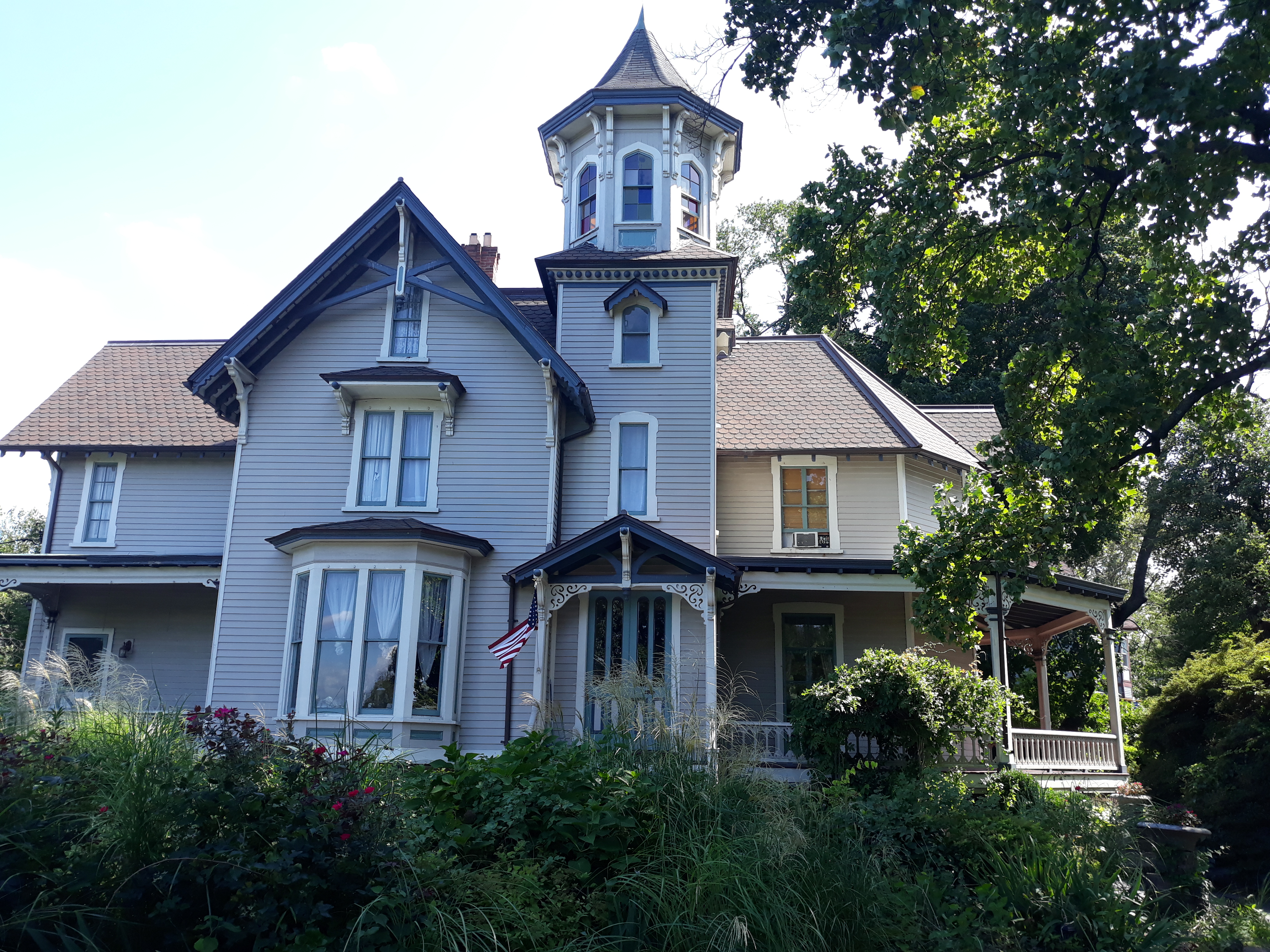
- The North facade of the building at One Pendleton Place

- Location within New York City Location within the United States
- Location: 1 Pendleton Place
- Nearest city: New Brighton, Staten Island, New York
- Coordinates: 40.6414°N 74.0921°W
- Architectural style: Italianate
- NRHP reference No.: 14000874
- NYCL No.: 2189

Significant dates
- Added to NRHP: Oct 24, 2010
- Designated NYCL: March 14, 2006

One Pendleton Place, also known as the William S. Pendleton House, is a historic home located in the New Brighton neighborhood of Staten Island, New York. It was built in 1860, and is a three-story, picturesque Italianate villa style frame dwelling with a multi-gabled roof. It features asymmetrical massing, a four-story conical-roofed entry tower, and multiple porches including a wrap-around verandah.

It was designated a New York City Landmark in 2006, and was listed on the National Register of Historic Places in 2014.

== See also ==
- List of New York City Designated Landmarks in Staten Island
- National Register of Historic Places listings in Richmond County, New York
