= Boardman–Mitchell House =

Historic house in Staten Island, New York

- Boardman-Mitchell House
- U.S. National Register of Historic Places
- New York City Landmark
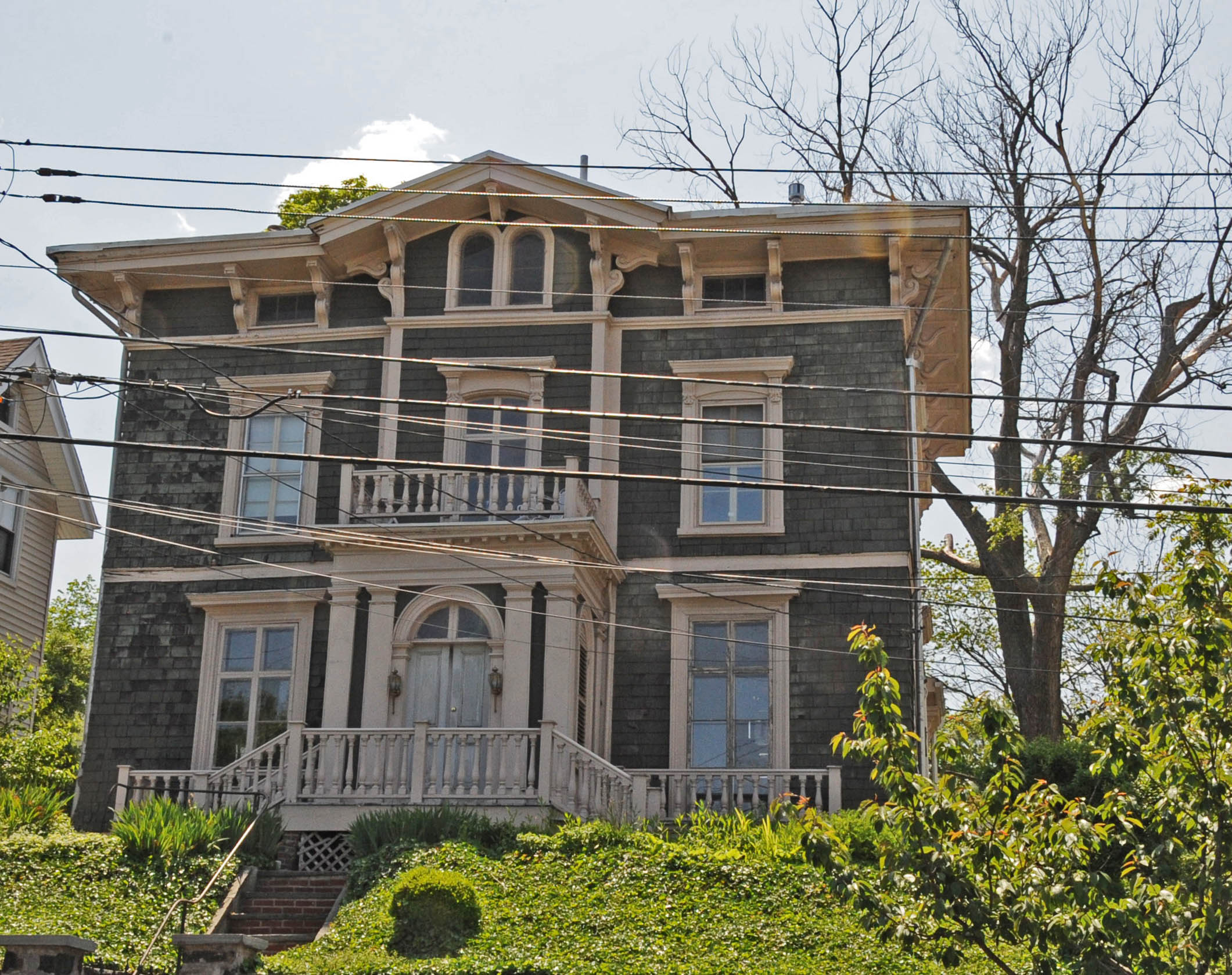

- Location within New York City Location within New York Location within the United States
- Location: 710 Bay Street, Staten Island, New York
- Coordinates: 40.6247°N 74.074571°W
- Area: 60' by 200'
- Built: 1848
- Architectural style: Italianate
- NRHP reference No.: 11001004
- NYCL No.: 1217

Significant dates
- Added to NRHP: January 4, 2012
- Designated NYCL: October 12, 1982

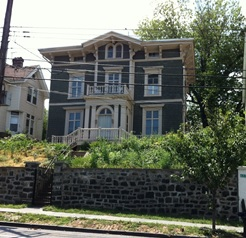
The Boardman Mitchell House. Staten Island, NY.

The Boardman–Mitchell House is a three-story, six-bedroom Italianate villa located at 710 Bay Street, Staten Island, New York. It also has the address of 33 Brownell Street since it connects to both streets. It is a New York City Landmark and was listed on the National Register of Historic Places in 2012. It is known as a good example of a suburban architectural style used in an urban setting, as well as its connection to the piloting history of that portion of Staten Island.

== History ==
The house was built by Dr. James Boardman of the Seaman's Retreat hospital. His widow sold it to Captain Elvin Eugene Mitchell, a founder of the Sandy Hook Pilots Benevolent Association and known for his dramatic rescue of 176 people from the SS Oregon sinking in 1886. It remained in the Mitchell family until 1968 and has been sold several times since. In 2009, it was given to Barnett Shepherd, a local preservationist who started restoring the building.

== See also ==
- List of New York City Designated Landmarks in Staten Island
- National Register of Historic Places listings in Richmond County, New York
