= Poillon-Seguine-Britton House =

Historic house in Staten Island, New York

- U.S. National Register of Historic Places
- New York City Landmark
- Location within New York City Location within New York Location within the United States
- Location: 361 Great Kills Road, Staten Island, New York
- Coordinates: 40°32′44″N 74°8′25″W
- Area: less than one acre
- Built: c. 1695
- Architect: Hornfager, Robert C. (1930 expansion)
- Architectural style: Greek Revival
- Demolished: April 1996
- NRHP reference No.: 84002942
- NYCL No.: 1209

Significant dates
- Added to NRHP: February 2, 1984
- Designated NYCL: August 25, 1981
- Delisted NYCL: 1997

Poillon-Seguine-Britton House was a historic home located in Great Kills, Staten Island, New York, near Great Kills Harbor. The original section was built about 1695 for the French immigrant Jacques Poillon, with a 2-story addition completed about 1845 after the home was sold to Joseph Seguine, and a final major expansion in 1930 for Richard Britton. It was a substantial, 2 1/2-story, stone-and-wood structure in the local vernacular style. The interior had some notable Greek Revival style details.

It was designated a New York City landmark in 1981 and added to the National Register of Historic Places in 1984, only to be burned in 1989 and demolished in 1996.

== See also ==
- List of New York City Designated Landmarks in Staten Island
- National Register of Historic Places listings in Richmond County, New York
