= Scott-Edwards House =

Historic house in Staten Island, New York

- U.S. National Register of Historic Places
- New York City Landmark
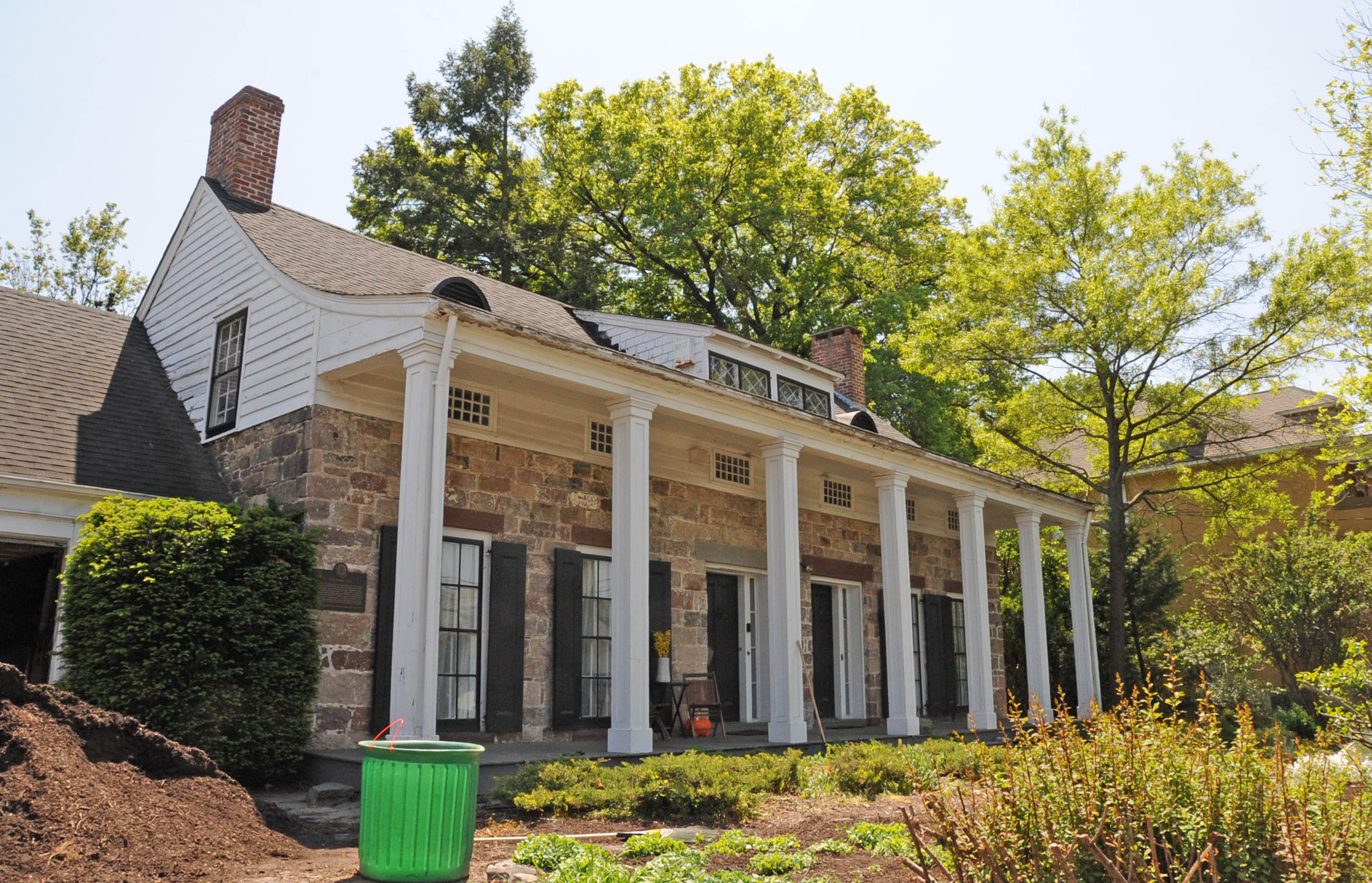

- Location within New York City Location within New York Location within the United States
- Location: 752 Delafield Ave., Staten Island, New York
- Coordinates: 40°37′43″N 74°7′26″W
- Area: less than one acre
- Built: 1730
- Architectural style: Greek Revival, Colonial
- NRHP reference No.: 83001786
- NYCL No.: 0342

Significant dates
- Added to NRHP: February 11, 1983
- Designated NYCL: August 24, 1967

Scott-Edwards House is a historic home located at West New Brighton, Staten Island, New York. It was built about 1730 and extensively remodeled in the 1840s in the Greek Revival style. The original section is a 1 1/2-story, stone structure with a clapboard upper section, originally in the Dutch Colonial style. The remodeling added a sweeping roof with an overhang supported by seven box columns. At the rear are two interconnecting frame additions completed about 1900.

It was added to the National Register of Historic Places in 1983.

== See also ==
- List of New York City Designated Landmarks in Staten Island
- National Register of Historic Places listings in Richmond County, New York
