= 364 and 390 Van Duzer Street =

Historic houses in Staten Island, New York

- Houses at 364 and 390 Van Duzer Street
- U.S. National Register of Historic Places
- New York City Landmark
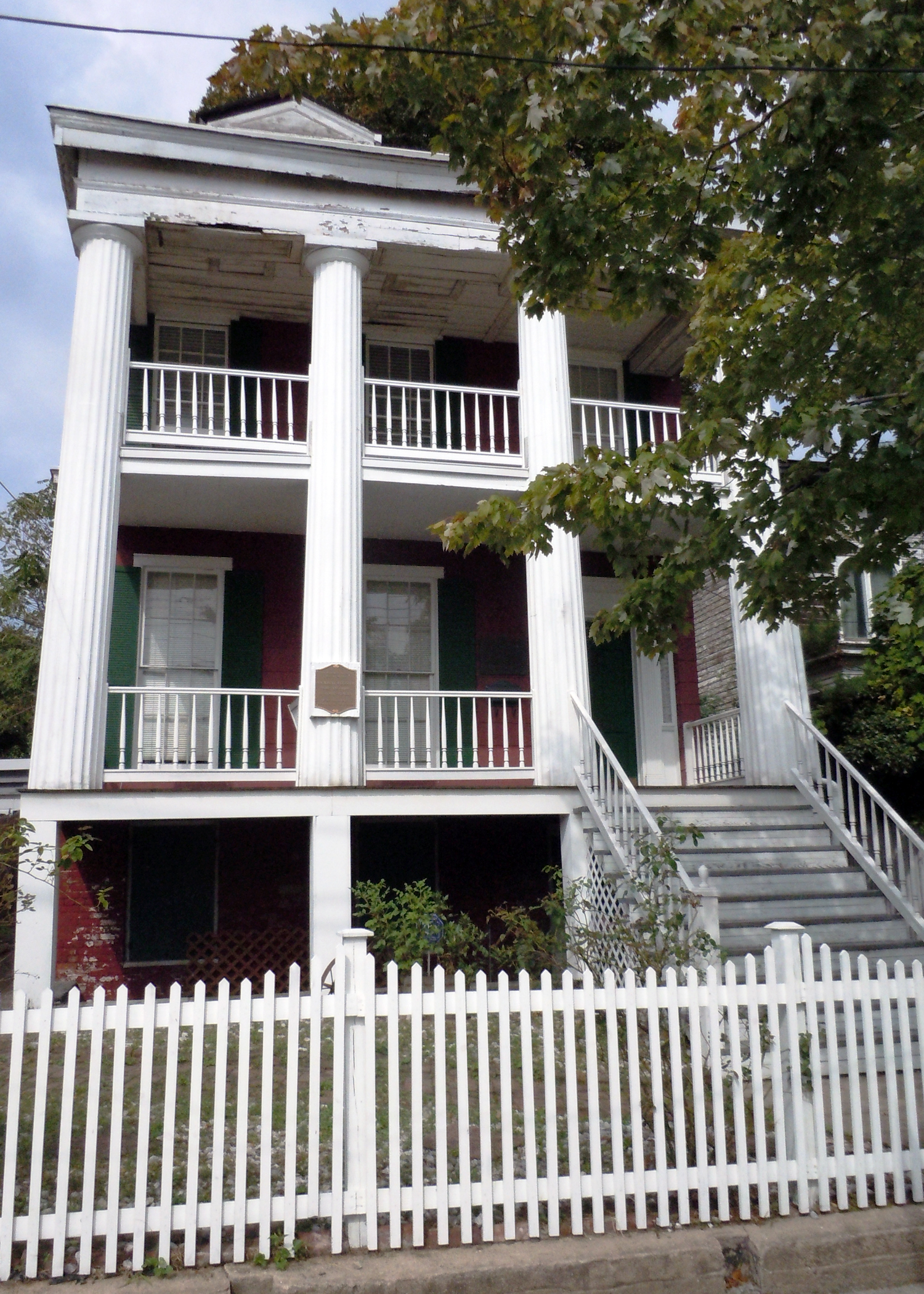
- 364 Van Duzer Street
- Location: Staten Island, New York
- Coordinates: 40°37′45″N 74°4′47″W
- Built: 1835
- Architectural style: Greek Revival, Dutch Colonial
- NRHP reference No.: 82001262
- NYCL No.: 0772, 0773

Significant dates
- Added to NRHP: November 14, 1982
- Designated NYCL: December 18, 1973

The houses at 364 and 390 Van Duzer Street are two historic homes located in the Stapleton neighborhood of Staten Island in New York City, located about a block apart from one another.

364 Van Duzer Street is a 2 1/2-story, clapboard-covered frame house with a gable roof. It features a tetrastyle portico with 2-story, Doric order columns rising to an overhanging spring-eave, unusual on a Greek Revival house and more characteristic of Dutch Colonial architecture. This hybrid style is indigenous to Staten Island. The house was built in 1835 by Robert M. Hazard, captain of the Nautilus, a ferryboat owned by Daniel Tompkins, as well as postmaster of Tompkinsville.

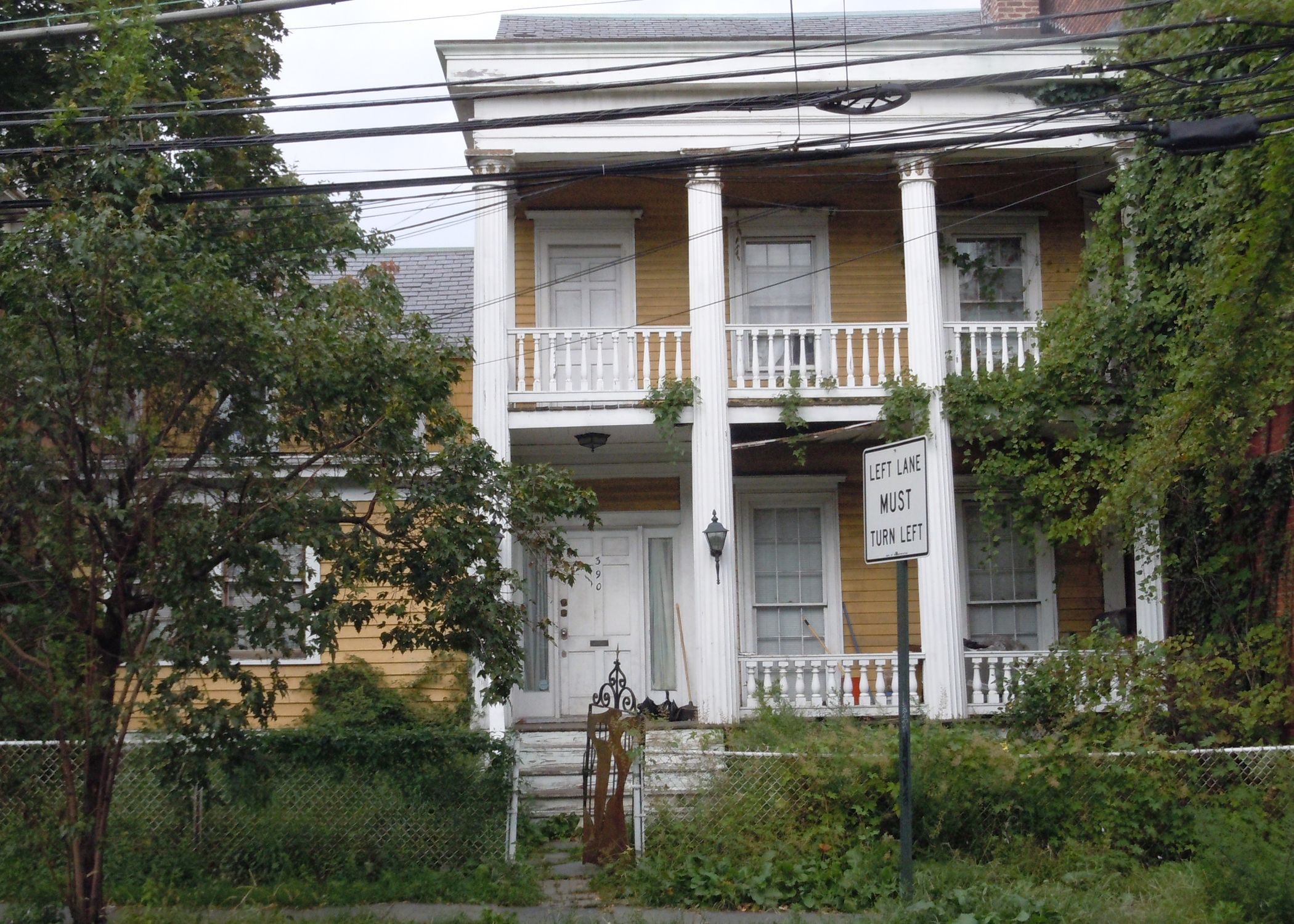
390 Van Duzer Street

390 Van Duzer Street is a 2 1/2-story, clapboard-covered house with an original 1 1/2-story kitchen wing. It also features a tetrastyle portico, but with 2-story Corinthian order columns.

Both buildings reflect Greek Revival style architecture of the 1830s.

Both buildings were designated as New York City Landmarks in 1973. The buildings were added to the National Register of Historic Places in 1982.

== See also ==
- List of New York City Designated Landmarks in Staten Island
- National Register of Historic Places listings in Richmond County, New York
