= St. Paul's Memorial Church (Staten Island) =

Episcopal church in Staten Island, New York

- St. Paul's Memorial Church and Rectory
- U.S. National Register of Historic Places
- New York City Landmark
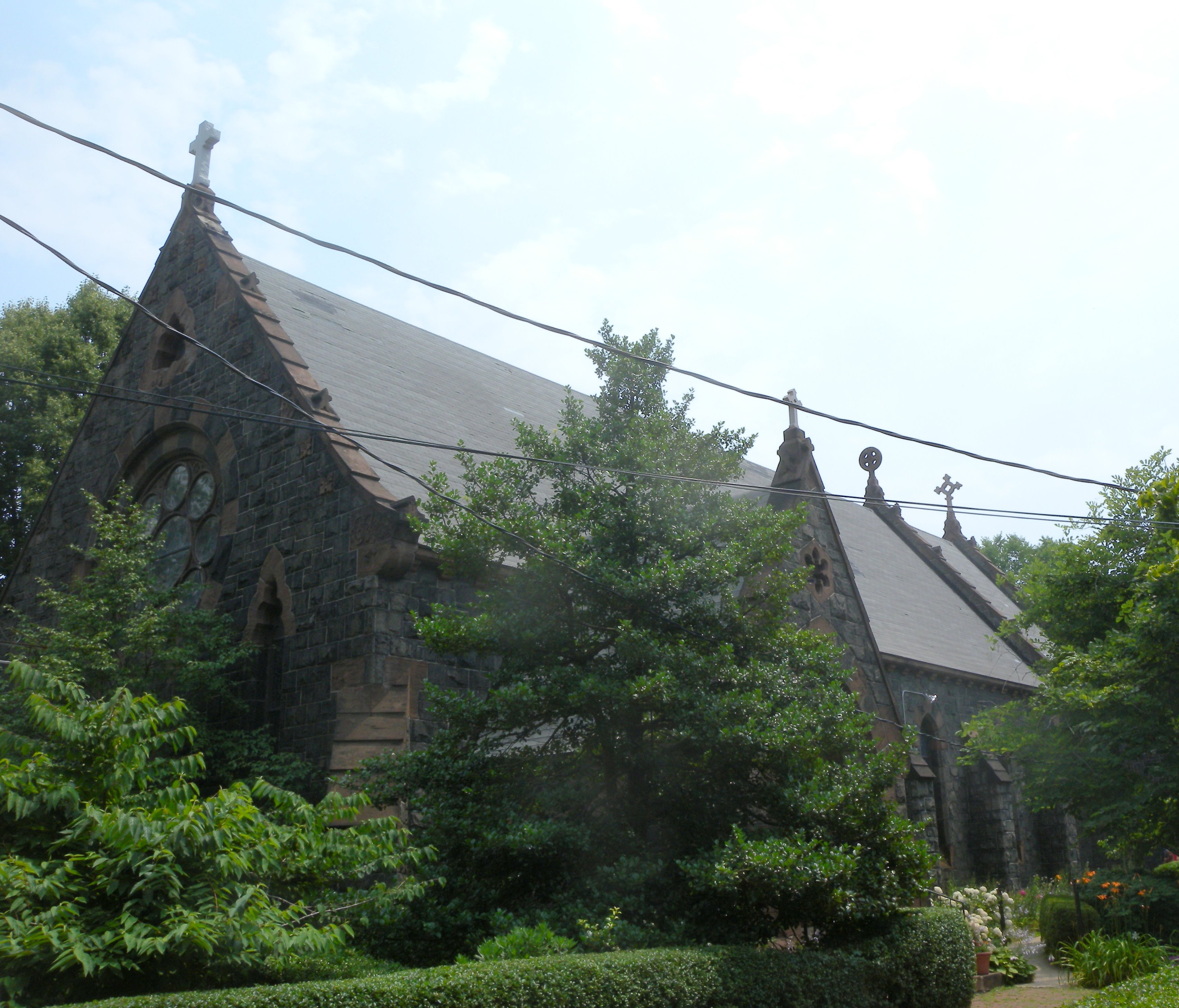
- St. Paul's Memorial Church, June 2010

- Location within New York City Location within New York Location within the United States
- Location: 225 St. Paul's Avenue; New York, New York
- Coordinates: 40°37′56″N 74°4′44.2″W
- Area: less than one acre
- Built: 1866
- Architect: Potter, Edward, T.
- Architectural style: High Victorian Gothic
- NRHP reference No.: 80002762
- NYCL No.: 0891

Significant dates
- Added to NRHP: November 21, 1980
- Designated NYCL: July 22, 1975

St. Paul's Memorial Church is an Anglo-Catholic Episcopal parish in New York City, New York located at 225 St. Paul's Avenue in the Stapleton area of Staten Island. The church reported 43 members in 2017 and 31 members in 2023; no membership statistics were reported in 2024 parochial reports. Plate and pledge income reported for the congregation in 2024 was $82,353 with average Sunday attendance (ASA) of 31 persons. This was a relative decrease on ASA of 43 reported in 2017.

== Building ==
The historic church was built in 1866 of rough-faced, irregularly cut blocks of Staten Island trap rock with brownstone trim. It has buttressed side walls, a steeply pitched roof, and angled buttresses at the corners. The front side features a central rose window. An auxiliary chapel was added in 1889. The rectory is also built of trap rock with brownstone trim. It was added to the National Register of Historic Places as "St. Paul's Memorial Church and Rectory" in 1980.

== See also ==
- List of New York City Designated Landmarks in Staten Island
- National Register of Historic Places listings in Richmond County, New York

== Gallery ==
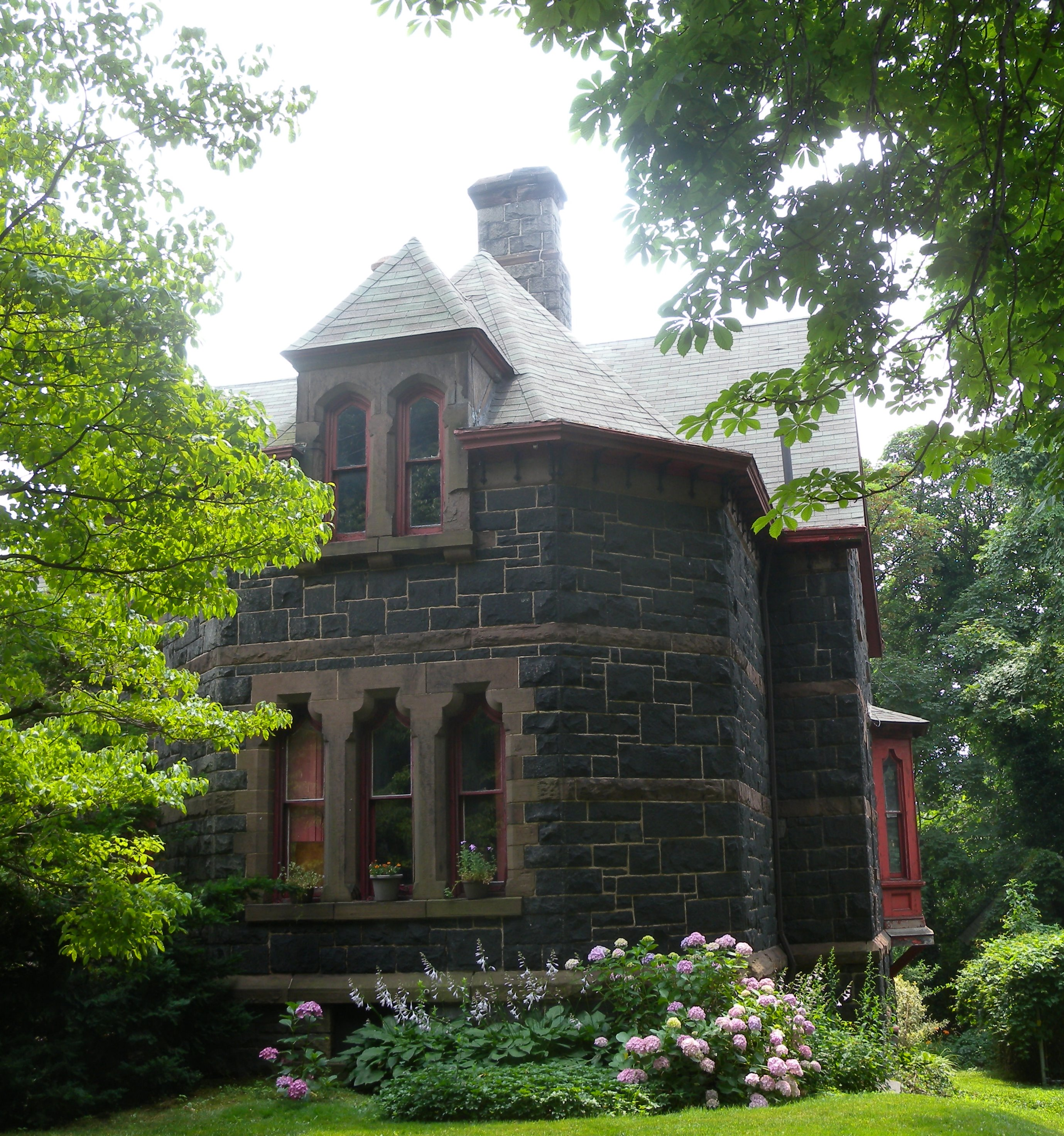
St. Paul's Rectory, June 2010
