= Kreuzer-Pelton House =

Historic house in Staten Island, New York

- U.S. National Register of Historic Places
- New York City Landmark
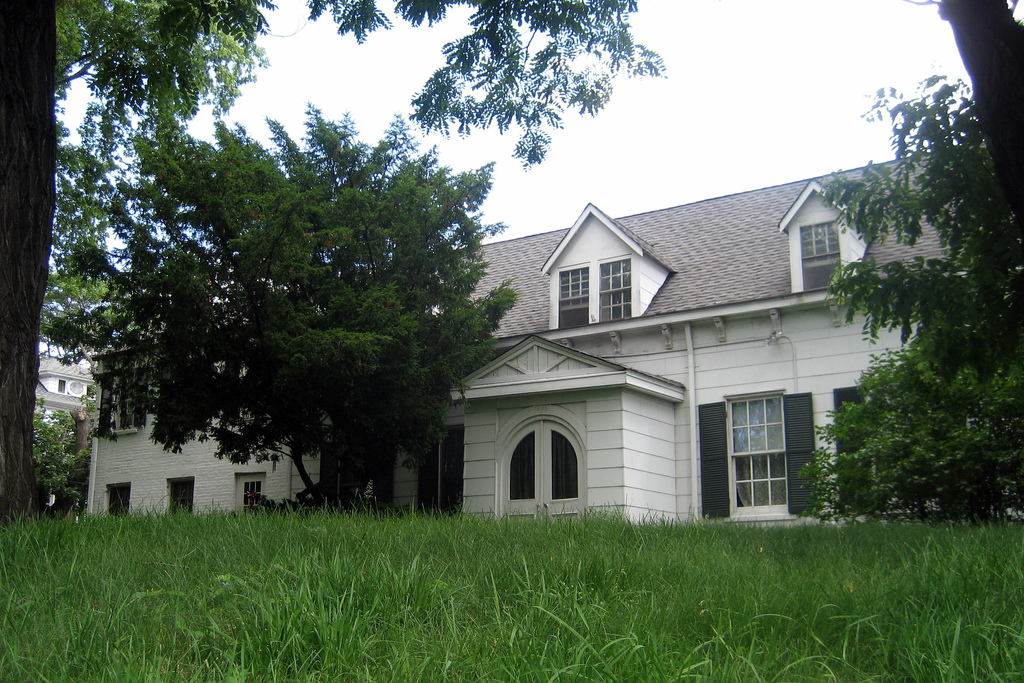
- Kreuzer-Pelton House, 2010

- Location within New York City Location within New York Location within the United States
- Location: 1262 Richmond Ter., Staten Island, New York
- Coordinates: 40°38′37″N 74°6′43″W
- Area: less than one acre
- Built: 1722
- Architect: Santvoord, Cornelius, Van
- Architectural style: Dutch Influence
- NRHP reference No.: 73001261
- NYCL No.: 0341

Significant dates
- Added to NRHP: January 29, 1973
- Designated NYCL: August 24, 1967

The Kreuzer-Pelton House is a Dutch-influenced fieldstone house on Staten Island in New York City. Erected in 1722 as a one-room cottage, it was expanded in two stages: in 1770 and in 1836. It is designated as a New York City landmark. The house was built by Joseph Rolph.

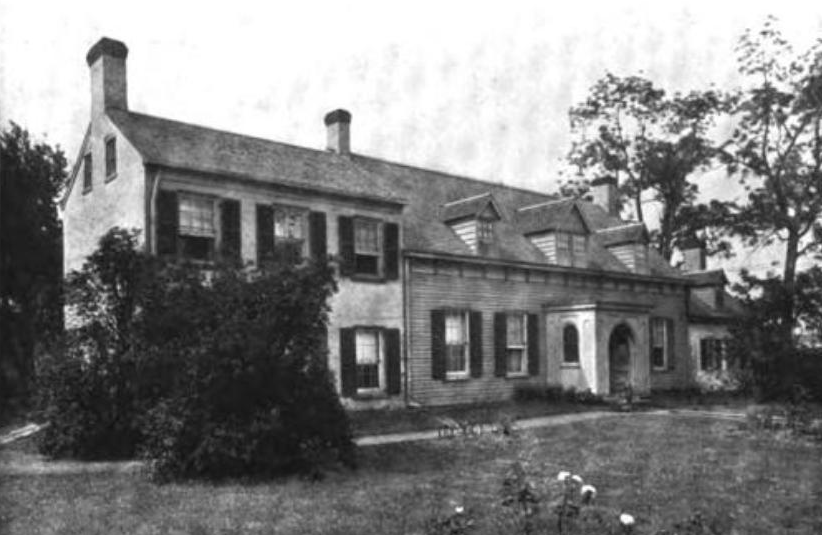
The Kreuzer-Pelton House in 1914

During the American Revolutionary War, Tory militia commander Cortlandt Skinner used the house as his headquarters. William IV of the United Kingdom was a guest at the house.

== See also ==
- List of New York City Designated Landmarks in Staten Island
- National Register of Historic Places listings in Richmond County, New York
