= Neville House (Staten Island) =

Historic house in Staten Island, New York

- U.S. National Register of Historic Places
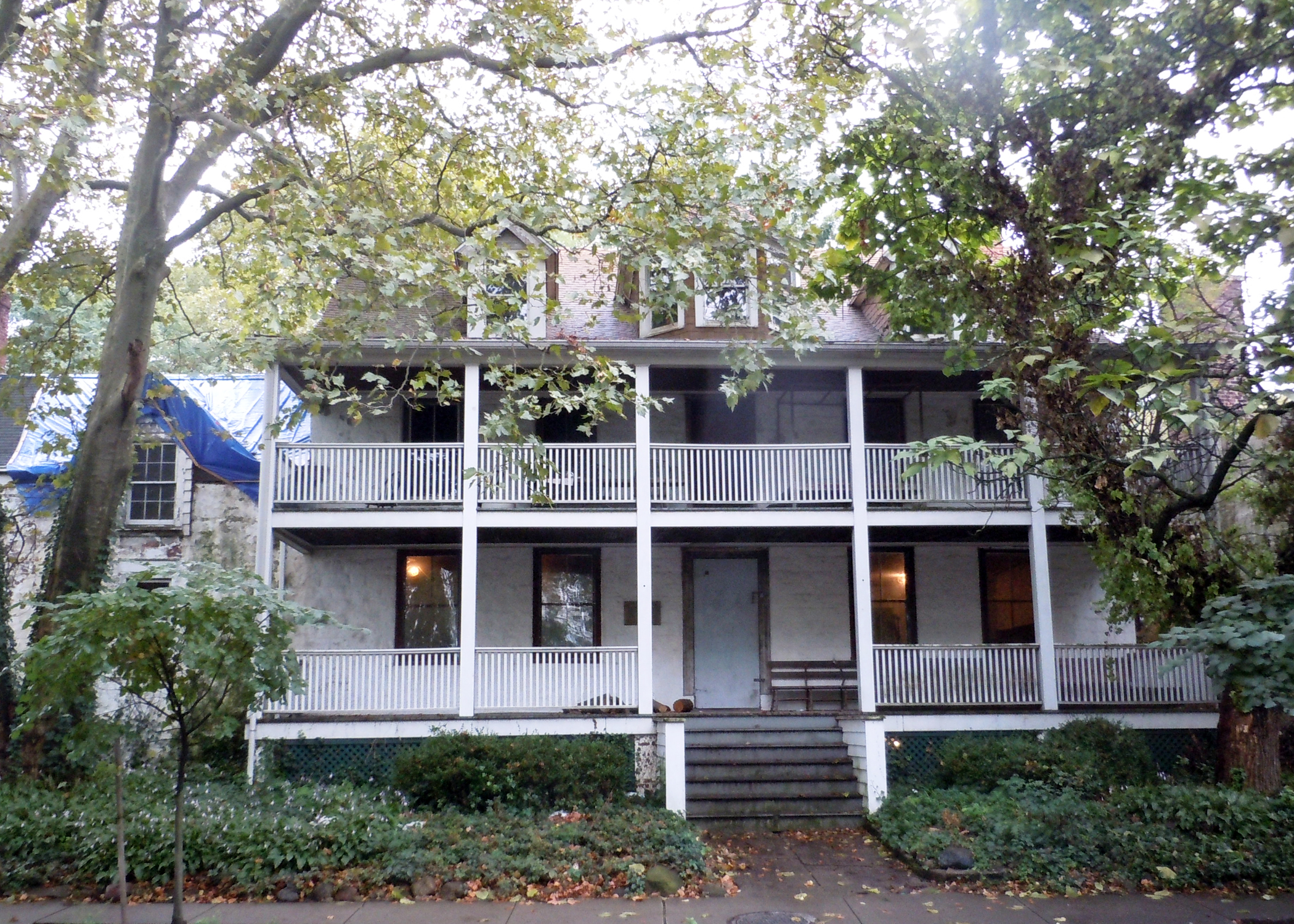
- Neville House, September 2012

- Location within New York City Location within New York Location within the United States
- Location: 806 Richmond Terrace, Staten Island, New York
- Coordinates: 40°38′40″N 74°5′57″W
- Area: less than one acre
- Built: 1770
- Architectural style: Vernacular 18th Century
- NRHP reference No.: 77000979
- Added to NRHP: July 28, 1977

Neville House (also known as the Tysen-Neville House) is a historic home located at New Brighton, Staten Island, New York. It was built about 1770 and is constructed of red, quarried sandstone. It is in two sections: a 2 1/2-story main section and 1 1/2-story east wing, each covered by a gable roof. It features a 2-story verandah.

It was designated as a New York City Landmark in 1967. It was also added to the National Register of Historic Places in 1977.
