= Serpentine Ridge Nature Preserve =

Coordinates: 40°37′26.2″N 74°5′12.3″W

The Serpentine Ridge Nature Preserve is a 40 acres woodland in the North Shore of Staten Island between Howard Avenue at the top of the ridge and Van Duzer Street at the bottom of the hill. The Serpentine Ridge plays an important part in Staten Island's ecosystem and biodiversity and maintains significant geological features. The Serpentine Ridge is a steep terrain on the east shore of the island within the Grymes Hill and Silver Lake neighborhoods of Staten Island. The area is notable for its variety of ecosystems including wooded hillsides, glacial sinkholes, and bare serpentine rock. The area is part of Staten Island's Special Hillsides Preservation District. The district was established to preserve the hilly terrain and unique natural features of the region, by reducing hillside erosion, landslides, and excessive storm-water runoff. Most of its land remains in a natural state, thus the area is covered with native vegetation. The Serpentine Art and Nature Commons owns approximately 11.5 acres of land within the area and acts as an environmental steward to the entire area.

== Biodiversity ==
The area provides significant biodiversity, with many flora, fauna species. Deer, opossums, squirrels, rabbits, raccoons, and a variety of birds live in its underbrush and trees. In recent years, a colony of red-tailed hawks has been spotted above the woodlands as well as the eastern screech owl, which while a common species, it has been hard to find on the island. The eastern box turtle (Terrapene Carolina) can also be found in the area and today it is considered a vulnerable species according to U.S. Federal Government and the State Animal Wild Life.

There are also several rare, endangered or threatened plants that can be found in the Serpentine Ridge Nature Reserve including:

- Green-flowered Milkweed (Asclepias viridiflora)
- Slender Knotweed (Polygonum tenue)
- Panic Grass (Dichanthelium oligosanthes)
- Smooth Aster (Symphyotrichum laeve)
- Fragrant Sumac (Rhus aromatica)

== Geology ==
The geology and coastal position of Staten Island add to its unique properties. Staten Island contains the only occurrence of serpentine bedrock in New York State, and the island occurs at the southern terminus of the most recent glaciation. This significant area includes one of Staten Island's five occurrences of the globally rare serpentine barrens community. This rare formation supports a unique variety of plant life.

== Threats ==
The Serpentine Ridge Nature Preserve is continuously being threatened by human activity related to construction and development projects proposed in the area. Most recently the City Planning Commission of New York City also known as NYC Planning has taken notice of that and projects such as the Harborlights Court development have been rejected.

== See also ==
- State Line Serpentine Barrens
- Soldiers Delight Natural Environment Area
