= Serpentine Art and Nature Commons =

The Serpentine Art and Nature Commons ("SANC" or "Serpentine Commons") is a not-for-profit organization founded in 1978. SANC is dedicated to preserving and maintaining the woodlands and serpentine ridge on the east shore of Staten Island and more specifically within the neighborhoods of Grymes Hill and Silver Lake.

The Serpentine Commons is a community-based group that provides open space, hikes and other educational opportunities to the North Shore of Staten Island on the more than 10 acres of the approximately 40 acres of land in the Serpentine Ridge Nature Preserve of the Special Hillsides Preservation District.

SANC owns the four lots comprising the over 10 acres of land thanks to a grant by the Trust for Public Land.

The steep slope park is open to everyone without charge. The hiking trails start at the bottom of the hill at 599 Van Duzer Street. There is also an entrance from the top of the hill at 255 Howard Avenue as well as a gated entrance by 30 Howard Circle.

The members meet monthly on the second Monday of the month at 7.30pm in the Kairos House at Wagner College. Anyone is invited to participate.
