= Notre Dame College (Staten Island) =

Coordinates: 40°37′16″N 74°5′27″W

Notre Dame College was a small Catholic women's college located in the Grymes Hill area of Staten Island, New York. It opened in 1933 as an affiliate of Fordham University and merged with St. John's University in 1971.

Notre Dame was located on the former estate of Herbert Gans. The site was originally purchased in the early 20th century by immigrant John Gans. He chose the Grymes Hill location for his family estate because it overlooked New York Harbor where he operated a steamship company. The main house of the estate, a 30-room Georgian mansion, was completed in 1915 and became home to son Herbert Gans and his family.

Notre Dame College opened with 13 students and graduated its first class in 1935. The alumnae association now has about 1,600 active members.

After the closure of Notre Dame College it became the Grymes Hill campus of St. John's University. St. John's closed the campus in 2024 and it was subsequently purchased by Wagner College in 2026.

== History ==
In the early 1930s, Herbert Gans and his wife befriended Mother Saint Egbert, later known as Sister Helen Flynn, a Sister of the Congregation of Notre Dame. She had just been named the director of the newly established Staten Island extension of Fordham University which was housed at Notre Dame Academy (Staten Island), a private school down the road from the Gans estate. When the small college of 13 students received its own charter in 1933, the Gans family sold the family mansion to the new Notre Dame College, which became a Catholic undergraduate college for women. The home, renamed Flynn Hall after the college foundress, opened in 1934 and graduated its first class in 1935.

In 1937, Lavelle Hall, an academic building, was added and named in honor of Monsignor Lavelle, the Vicar General of the Archdiocese of New York. A science building followed in 1945 named Mahoney Hall, after its principal benefactor.

In 1955, the college doubled its property with the purchase of the Herbert Gans estate, which included several properties, the largest of which served as the college library. It was named Spellman Hall after Francis Spellman, then cardinal archbishop of the Archdiocese of New York, who contributed toward its reconstruction. The final purchase, an English Tudor home at the far end of the campus, was made in 1965. The Drury family, who had purchased the house from Hans Gans in 1945, sold the house and surrounding property to Notre Dame College. It was renamed Rosati Hall in honor of Bishop Joseph Rosati, C.M. 1789–1843.

Notre Dame College served the community as a premier women's college for over 30 years.

=== Merger into St. John's University ===
During the late 1960s, when it became difficult for small colleges to survive, Terence Cooke, then Cardinal Archbishop of the Archdiocese of New York, asked the Vincentian Fathers of St. John's University, to integrate Notre Dame College, in order that Catholic higher education remain a vibrant presence in the Staten Island community and its environs.

On January 27, 1971, the New York State Board of Regents approved the consolidation and the Staten Island Campus of St. John's University became a reality. Classes began in the fall of 1971, combining the original Notre Dame College with the Brooklyn campus of St. John's, offering undergraduate degrees in liberal arts, business and education.

== See also ==
- List of defunct colleges and universities in New York
