= Staten Island Serpentinite =

Coordinates: 40°37′31″N 74°5′8″W

The Staten Island Serpentinite locality is a southward extension of the New England Uplands, adjacent to the Manhattan Prong. It includes Todt Hill on Staten Island, which is the highest point along the Atlantic Seaboard south of Maine, at 410 feet (120 m) above sea level. "Todt" is a Dutch word meaning "dead." This hill perhaps received its name from the Dutch settlers because the hilltops overlooking The Narrows consisted of scattered treeless rocky exposures. The chemical character of the bedrock was, in part, the reason for this. Much of Staten Island is covered by the Harbor Hill moraine, the terminal moraine of the last Wisconsin Stage glacier. However, ledges of bedrock consisting of ultramafic rock -- serpentinite—are exposed throughout the upland areas on Staten Island. Grymes Hill, the second highest point on Staten Island and just a few miles from Todt Hill has similar bedrock characteristics. Serpentine, the dominant mineral in serpentinite, is rich in magnesium, an element that most plants cannot tolerate in high concentrations. The enrichment of magnesium in the thin serpentine soil covering the glacier-scoured hilltops is probably responsible for the original barren exposures on Todt Hill. However, where reasonably thick till lies over the serpentinite it also has material from non-ultramafic rock such as red sandstone, siltstone and shale which add mineral nutrients that the serpentinite lacks. Consequently the vegetation over Staten Island Serpentinite often has normal vigour. Soils of the Todthill and Wotalf series occur on this mixed till.

The serpentinite has a bluish to greenish gray color, and consists of serpentine (mostly the variety antigorite), with accessory minerals of chrysotile (a form of asbestos), magnetite, and talc. Serpentinite is derived by the metamorphism of ultramafic rocks (rocks rich in the minerals olivine and pyroxene) in a water-rich environment. The probable original setting for these rocks was within the igneous crust beneath the Iapetus Ocean. The occurrence of serpentinite in the core of Staten Island is an indication that the allochthonous basement rocks consisting of oceanic crustal material were thrust landward onto the eastern margin of the continent during the Taconic orogeny. The occurrence of serpentinite is consistent with the interpretation that Staten Island is east of Cameron's Line.
