= Victory Boulevard buses =

Bus routes in New York City

s61, s62, s66 s91, s92
- Victory Boulevard; Victory Boulevard/Jewett Avenue; Victory Boulevard/Forest Hill Road
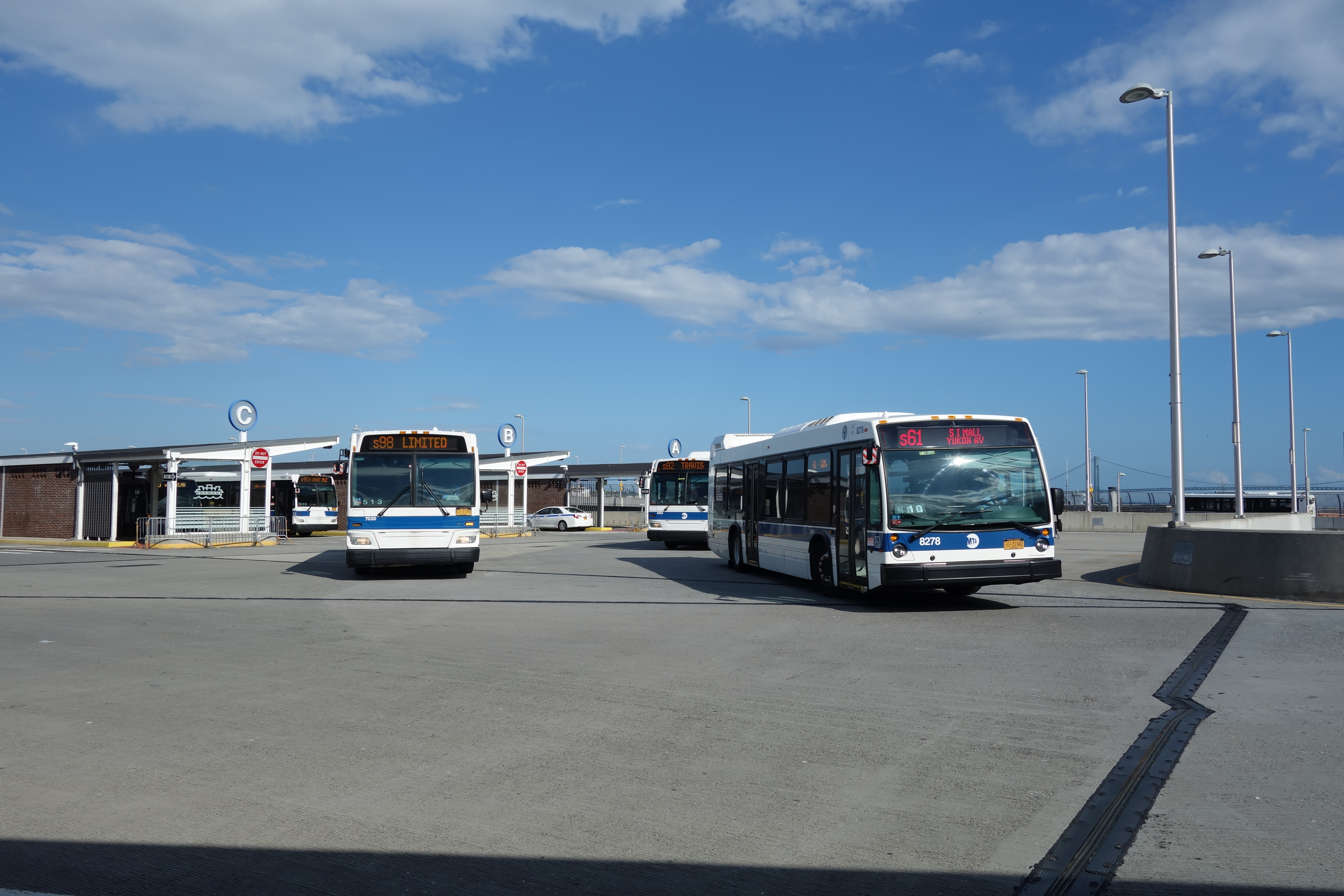
- A 2015 Nova Bus LFS (8278) on the Staten Island Mall-bound S61 and a 2009 Orion VII NG HEV (4053) on the ConEdison Travis-bound S92 departing St. George Ferry Terminal, alongside other buses

Overview
- System: MTA Regional Bus Operations
- Operator: New York City Transit Authority
- Garage: Yukon Depot (S61, S62, S91, S92); Castleton Depot (S66)
- Vehicle: Orion VII EPA10 (S66); Nova Bus LFS
- Began service: 1989-1990 (S61, S62, S66); 1990s (S91, S92)
- Predecessors: R6, R112

Route
- Locale: Staten Island, New York, U.S.
- Communities served: St. George, Tompkinsville, Silver Lake, Grymes Hill, Sunnyside, Castleton Corners, Port Richmond, Bulls Head, Manor Heights, Heartland Village, New Springville, Travis
- Start: St. George Ferry Terminal
- Via: Victory Boulevard, Jewett Avenue (S66), Bradley Avenue (S61, S91), Forest Hill Road (S61, S91)
- End: New Springville – Staten Island Mall (S61, S91); Travis/Chelsea - ConEdison Travis (S62, S92); Port Richmond - Richmond Terrace & Port Richmond Avenue (S66)
- Length: 9.1 miles (14.6 km) (S61, S91); 8.2 miles (13.2 km) (S62, S92); 7.7 miles (12.4 km) (S66)
- Other routes: S93 Clove Road/Victory Boulevard Limited; SIM31 Eltingville/Forest Hill Road/Midtown; SIM32 Travis/Victory Boulevard/Downtown

Service
- Operates: 24 hours (S62); All times except late nights (S61); Weekdays (S66); Rush hours (S91, S92)
- Annual patronage: 746,926 (S61/S91)(2025); 710,468 (S62/S92)(2025); 201,602 (S66)(2025)
- Transfers: Yes
- Timetable: S61/S91 S62/S92 S66

The S61, S62, S66, S91, and S92 buses constitute a public transit line in Richmond County, New York City. These routes primarily run along Victory Boulevard towards multiple western Staten Island communities, splitting at Mid-Island. They are operated by the MTA Regional Bus Operations under the New York City Transit Authority brand.

== Route description ==
All five routes begin at St. George Ferry Terminal Ramp A, exiting the terminal and running on Bay Street until Victory Boulevard, where they all turn west and run along it. The S66 deviates from the route at Highland Avenue to serve Grymes Hill and Wagner College, rejoining Victory Boulevard at Clove Road. They all run together until Jewett Avenue, where the routes split:

- The S61 and S91 continue west on Victory Boulevard for a short distance before turning south onto Bradley Avenue. It later turns west onto Harold Street, and south again onto Forest Hill Road, west on Travis Avenue, south on Merry Mount Street, east on Richmond Hill Road and south onto Marsh Avenue, entering the Staten Island Mall. It continues south on Marsh Avenue until Platinum Avenue, continuing until its western end and making two consecutive left turns onto Yukon Avenue, continuing until terminating a short distance from the Yukon Depot.
- The S62 and S92 continue west on Victory Boulevard until its western end at ConEdison Travis, where it terminates.
- The S66 turns to run north on Jewett Avenue until turning west on Castleton Avenue. It then runs north on Port Richmond Avenue until it terminates at Richmond Terrace.

The S91 and S92 are limited-stop variants of the S61 and S62. The S91 and S92 make limited stops between St. George and Jewett Avenue, with the S61, S62 and S66 providing local service. During AM rush hours, the S61 does not run towards St. George, with the S91 providing service instead. During either AM or PM rush hours, S62 service west of College of S.I. is replaced by the S92, as well as additional short turns everyday between College of S.I. and St. George. Late night S62 trips bypass College of S.I..

The S61, S62, S91, and S92 are based out of Yukon Depot, while the S66 is based out of Castleton Depot.

=== School trippers ===
When school is in session, the following service patterns operate:

- S61 - one trip in each direction short-turns at Space Shuttle Columbia School from St. George. The A.M. trip departs at 7:25am and the P.M. trip departs at 3:10pm. Three buses also depart for St. George from Susan E. Wagner High School at 3:05pm, heading to Bradley Avenue via Brielle Avenue, Manor Road and Harold Street.
- S62 - one trip in each direction originates at Notre Dame Academy at 2:55pm.
- S66 - an extra morning trip to St. George originates at Clove Road, departing at 7:26am.

== History ==
The S62 and S66 were originally the R112 and R6, respectively. The R112 originally only ran between Travis and Victory Boulevard-Jewett Avenue, with rush hour trips operating as a shuttle between the latter and St. George. It also ran special weekend service between St. George and Willowbrook State School, with trips coinciding with the visitor hours. When the College of S.I. first opened, select trips ran to/from the campus entrance. The R6 originally consisted of a full-time route between Port Richmond and St. George via Jewett Avenue and a weekday shuttle in Grymes Hill, designated the S6S.

Sometime between April 2, 1989 and April 15, 1990, the R112 was renamed to the S62, the R6 and S6S were relabeled to the S66 and S60, respectively, and the S61 was created. The S91 and S92 were also created sometime in the early-1990s and the S62 was also extended to service the full length of Victory Boulevard.

On September 10, 1995, weekend and overnight service on the S66 were discontinued due to service cuts implemented to reduce a budget deficit. The S66 changes were expected to save $309,000 annually and additionally, plans were previously announced by New York City Transit on March 15th of the same year to also eliminate weekend S60 service, which would have saved an additional $32,000 a year, but this change didn't go through.

In 2007, another stop was added at Forest Avenue for the S91 and S92, allowing an extra transfer to the S48. On June 27, 2010, due to another round of service cuts to reduce a budget deficit, the S60 was merged into the S66.
