= Victor Costa =

American fashion designer

- Born: 17 December 1935; Houston, Texas, U.S.
- Education: Pratt Institute; University of Houston; École d'Chambre Syndicale de la Haute Couture
- Labels: Victor Costa Bridal; Victor Costa; Victor Costa Collection
- Spouses: Terry (m. 1958; div. 1986); Jerry Ann Woodfin (m. 2015)
- Children: 2

Victor Costa (born December 17, 1935) is an American fashion designer. Dubbed the "King of Copycats," he attained international fame in the mid-1970s for mimicking high-end European styles, tailoring them to his American audiences for affordable prices.

In 1987, the New York Times reported that, along with Christian Lacroix and Arnold Scaasi, Costa "is widely recognized... as a significant contributor to the current vogue for flamboyant, super-feminine dresses that bare the shoulders, hug the waistline and billow and swirl over the hips." He founded Victor Costa, Inc. and later Victor Costa Bridal, and designed for several large retail outlets well into the 1990s. At one time, he was delivering merchandise to five different markets a year.

Costa is known for his extensive list of loyal customers, including Betsy Bloomingdale, Brooke Shields and Ivana Trump; he has also designed for First Ladies Lady Bird Johnson and Rosalynn Carter, as well as President Richard Nixon's daughters, Tricia Nixon Cox and Julie Nixon Eisenhower.

== Early life ==
Costa was born in Houston's Fifth Ward, the second of three children. His father was a metal worker from Sicily. His family lived in three rooms behind his grandparents' grocery store. As a young boy, he developed a love for the fashions of Hollywood celebrities and began designing his own paper dolls and selling them to his classmates for two cents each. As a teenager, he designed prom dresses for his high school classmates. He went on to attend the Pratt Institute in New York and later University of Houston, where he studied fashion; he traveled to Paris to attend the École d'Chambre Syndicale de la Haute Couture, an institute operated by the Chambre Syndicale, the fashion trade association in Paris.

== Career ==
Returning from Paris, Costa began selling his fashion sketches to designers and merchandizers including Oleg Cassini and Ceil Chapman.

He soon went to work at the dress house of Suzy Perette, a dress house, where he developed a technique to visually capture the basic essence of popular European designs and styles.

He moved to Dallas, bought a fashion house — the Ann Murray company — and began manufacturing his designs in a 50,000 square foot facility. His company sold $1 million in product during its first year of operation. Saks Fifth Avenue and Neiman Marcus became his top customers; by 1987, he was selling them $3.6 million and $3 million worth of product, respectively, every year. He also sold more than $1 million annually to Nordstrom, Bergdorf Goodman, and Marshall Field. By 1988, his company was grossing $50 million annually.

In 2000, he introduced the Victor Costa Occasion Collection on QVC, where it attained $500,000 in sales. By 2008, that number had grown to more than $10 million.

He is a member of the Council of Fashion Designers of America.

== Personal life ==
Costa married his high school sweetheart, Terry, in 1958 while studying in Paris. They had two children together, Kevin and Adrienne, and divorced after 28 years of marriage in 1986.

In 1984 Costa met Clay Cope, who became his romantic partner for 28 years.

In 2012, Costa married Jerry Ann Woodfin.

== See also ==
- List of fashion designers
