= Castleton Corners, Staten Island =

Neighborhood in New York City

Coordinates: 40°36′47″N 74°07′21″W

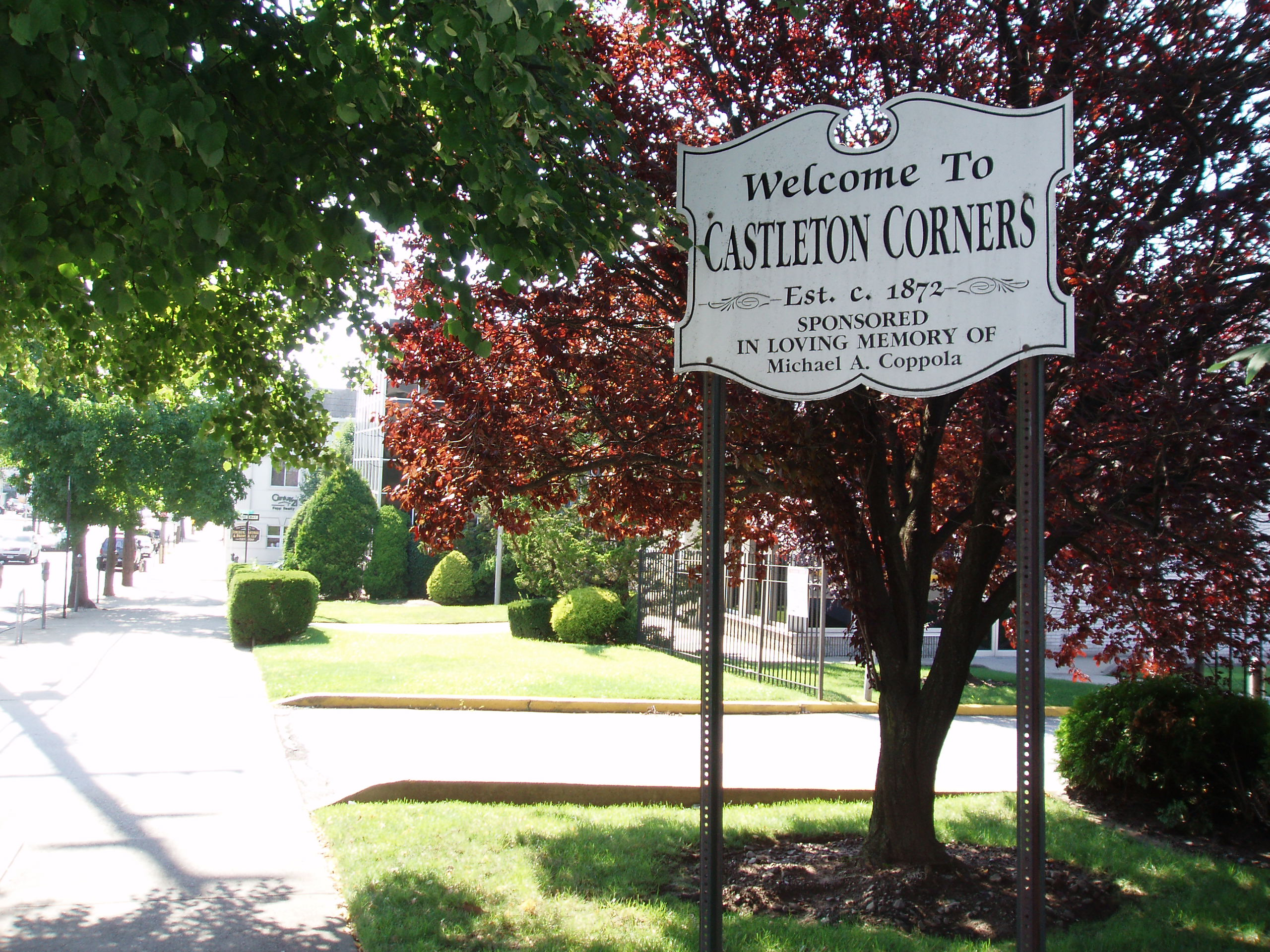
Castleton Corners

Castleton Corners (or Four Corners) is an upscale neighborhood of Staten Island, one of the five boroughs of New York City. It is bounded by Westerleigh in the West, West Brighton in the East, Port Richmond by the North, and Todt Hill/Emerson Hill to the South/Southeast. Castleton Corners is in a region of the island often referred to as the North Shore, Staten Island.

== Description ==
The word "corners" in the neighborhood's name refers to the intersection of Victory Boulevard and Manor Road, which forms its core. This part of Castleton, Staten Island was once called Centerville, but became more popularly known as Castleton Corners when a post office by that name was opened there in 1872. "Castleton" refers to Cassiltowne, County Kildare, Ireland, the birthplace of Thomas Dongan, the colonial governor of the Province of New York after it was obtained from the Dutch—who had called it New Amsterdam—in 1682. The post office later closed, but reopened in 1949, and today it is the general, or main, post office for Staten Island as a whole, its ZIP Code being 10314.

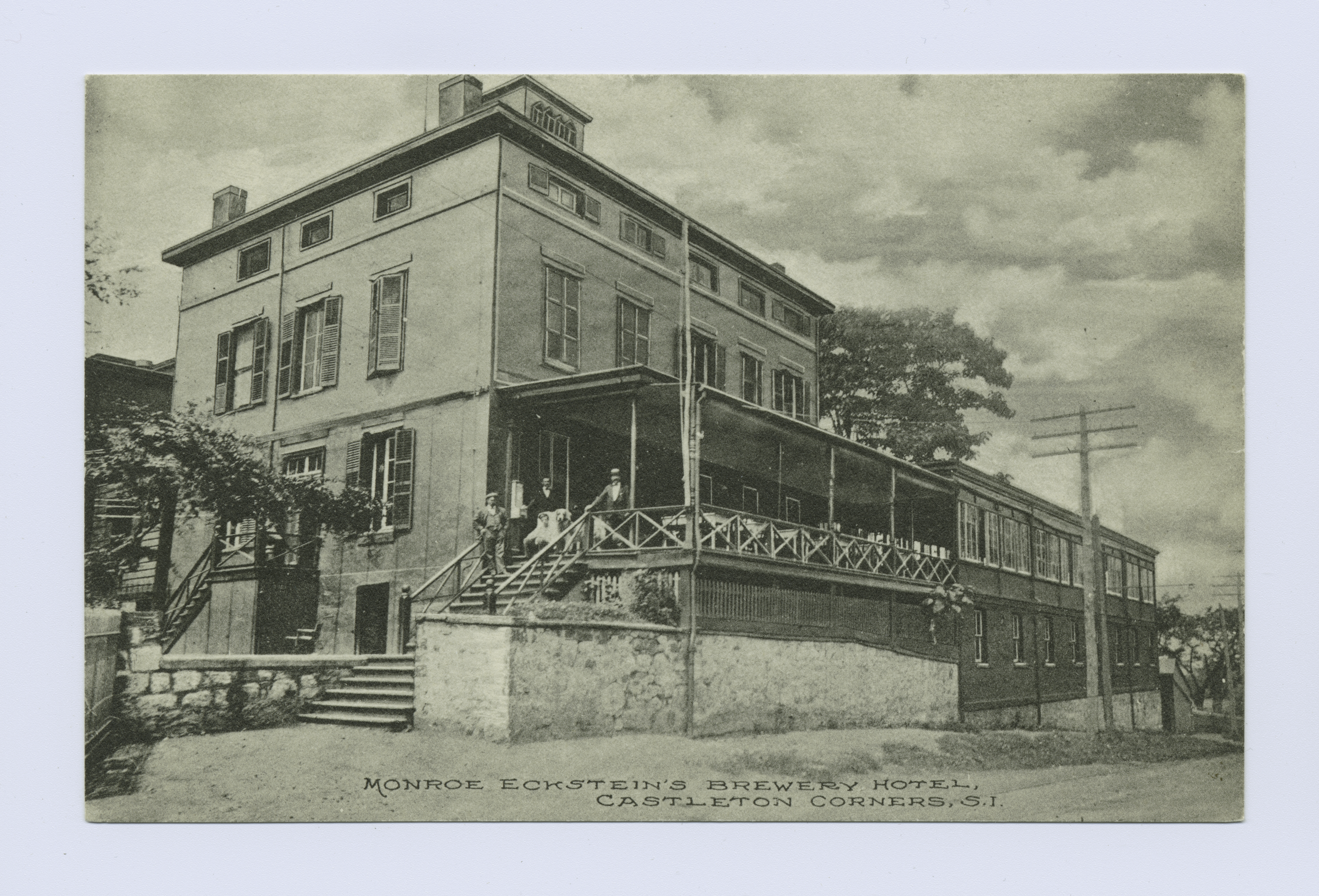
A hotel in the early 20th century

Castleton Corners is separated from its eastern neighbor Sunnyside by Castleton Hill, noted for the two churches that stand across from one another on its western ridge—a Moravian church (Castleton Hill Moravian Church) on one side of Victory Boulevard and a Roman Catholic church (St. Teresa's) on the other. To the north lies West Brighton, with the Staten Island Armory of the New York Army National Guard at the boundary between the two. Westerleigh and Meiers Corners lie to the northwest and southwest, respectively, and Todt Hill rises to the south. The Todt Hill public housing project is actually in Castleton Corners in spite of its name.

The corner of Victory Boulevard and Manor Road has long been the center of an important commercial district, although its prominence has declined somewhat in recent decades due to the opening of the Staten Island Mall in 1973. The area had largely been built up by the time the Verrazzano–Narrows Bridge opened in 1964. Castleton Corners was relatively unaffected by the dramatic upsurge in population after the bridge's opening, compared with most other neighborhoods on the island.

== Demographics ==
For census purposes, the New York City Department of City Planning classifies Castleton Corners as part of a larger Neighborhood Tabulation Area called Westerleigh-Castleton Corners SI0105. This designated neighborhood had 31,458 inhabitants based on data from the 2020 United States Census. This was an increase of 1,642 persons (5.5%) from the 29,816 counted in 2010. The neighborhood had a population density of 17.9 inhabitants per acre (14,500/sq mi; 5,600/km^{2}).

The racial makeup of the neighborhood was 62.8% (20,597) White (Non-Hispanic), 4.1% (1,348) Black (Non-Hispanic), 19.8% (6,486) Asian, and 3% (971) from two or more races. Hispanic or Latino of any race were 10.4% (3,420) of the population.

According to the 2020 United States Census, this area has many cultural communities of over 1,000 inhabitants. This include residents who identify as Mexican, Puerto Rican, English, Polish, German, Irish, Italian, and Chinese.

The largest age group was people 50-64 years old, which made up 21.5% of the residents. 71.8% of the households had at least one family present. Out of the 11,386 households, 53.8% had a married couple (21.8% with a child under 18), 3.9% had a cohabiting couple (1.2% with a child under 18), 16.1% had a single male (1.4% with a child under 18), and 26.1% had a single female (3.6% with a child under 18). 31.4% of households had children under 18. In this neighborhood, 27.6% of non-vacant housing units are renter-occupied.

== Education ==
The schools are P.S. 29 and St. Teresa's School.

== Transportation ==
Castleton Corners is served by the S54, S61, S62, S66, S91, S92 and S93 local bus routes and the SIM3, SIM31, SIM32, SIM33 and SIM34 express bus routes. The former S67 route through Castleton Corners was discontinued in 2010 due to low ridership, and many bus routes through the area were truncated to run a shorter route or only during weekdays.
