= Tompkins Circle =

Traffic median in Staten Island, New York

Coordinates: 40.635708°N 74.080491°W

Tompkins Circle is a .131-acre green public space within a traffic circle in the Grymes Hill neighborhood of Staten Island, New York. The circle is located in a section of the neighborhood historically known as Pavilion Hill. At this traffic circle, the Tompkins Circle loop merges with Fiedler Avenue and Ward Avenue.

Tompkins Circle is named in honor of prominent Staten Island resident Daniel D. Tompkins (1774-1825), who owned property in this neighborhood. A more recent resident of Ward Hill was Joe Marotta (1942-2008), a civic activist who served on several community planning boards and operated a pharmacy in Tompkinsville. Following his death in November 2008, a bench was dedicated at this park in his memory.
