= John William Martin =

British academic (1864–1956)

John William Martin (1864 or 1865 – 6 April 1956) was a British Fabian who later became an academic in the United States.

Born in Lincoln, Lincolnshire, Martin became a pupil teacher when he was thirteen, and by furthering his education in this way, he eventually won a scholarship to the Borough Road Training College. During his time there, he was active in radical politics, and formed a debating society.

After leaving the college, Martin attended the University of London, graduating in 1889. He worked as a teacher for several years, then became a lecturer at the East London Technical College.

Martin became active in the Fabian Society and served on its executive from 1894. In 1899, he traveled to lecture in the United States, and while there met Prestonia Mann, a leading figure in the American Fabian Society. They married in 1900, and settled on Grymes Hill in Staten Island, New York.

In New York, Martin served on the Board of Education for eight years and was a director of the League of Political Education. In 1929, he moved to become a professor at Rollins College in Florida, where he remained until his death in 1956. He left his house to the college, which now served as the university's music department, under the name "Martin Hall".
