= Special Hillsides Preservation District =

Coordinates: 40.62345°N 74.08691°W

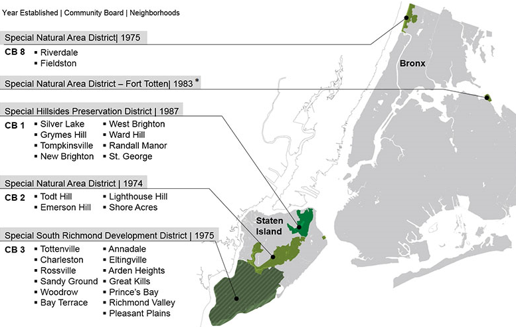
Special Hillsides Preservation District

The Special Hillsides Preservation District was created in 1987 by the City of New York to preserve the hilly terrains of the North Shore of Staten Island. The district maintains different planning rules to the rest of the City to account for the geological and bio diversity of the area. The district's goals are to reduce hillside erosion, landslides, and excessive storm-water runoff by conserving vegetation and protecting natural terrain; preserve hillsides with unique aesthetic value; protect areas of outstanding natural beauty; and protect neighborhood character.

The district is under the Staten Island Community Board 1 supervision and it affects the green areas in the following Staten Island neighborhoods: Grymes Hill, New Brighton, Randall Manor, Silver Lake, St. George, Tompkinsville, Ward Hill, and West Brighton.

There have been current debates on whether the new proposed rules announced in 2019 by NYC's Department of City Planning (DCP) meant to establish clear rules for home construction projects, will actually weaken the environmental protection goals of the preservation districts, as they will remove opportunities for public input on proposed developments in their neighborhood.
