= Dawn Aponte =

American football administrator and attorney (born c. 1971)

New York Giants
- Title: Senior vice president of football operations and strategy

Personal information
- Born: 1971 or 1972 (age 54–55)

Career information
- High school: Notre Dame Academy (Staten Island, New York)
- College: Delaware; Wagner College; New York Law School

Career history
- New York Jets (1994–2001) Accountant; New York Jets (2001–2003) Salary cap analyst and pro personnel assistant; New York Jets (2003–2005) Manager of football administration; New York Jets (2005) Senior director of football administration; National Football League (2006–2008) Vice president of labor finance; Cleveland Browns (2009–2010) Vice president of football administration; Miami Dolphins (2010–2012) Senior vice president of football operations; Miami Dolphins (2012–2016) Executive vice president of football administration; National Football League (2017–2026) Chief administrator of football operations; New York Giants (2026–present) Senior vice president of football operations and strategy

Dawn Marie DiFortuna-Aponte (born c. 1971) is an American football administrator, accountant, and attorney. She is the senior vice president of football operations and strategy for the New York Giants of the National Football League (NFL), having served in the position since February 2026. She was the chief administrator of football operations for the NFL from June 2017 to 2026.

== Early life ==
Aponte was born c. 1971) grew up in Staten Island, New York. She attended Notre Dame Academy. She went to the University of Delaware and graduated in 1993 with a B.S. degree in accounting.

== Professional career ==
=== New York Jets ===
While enrolled at Delaware, she interned with the New York Jets as an accountant, and took a full-time position in 1994. She graduated from Wagner College in 1999 with an M.B.A. degree in finance and management, and received a Juris Doctor from New York Law School in February 2003. In May 2001, the Jets promoted her to salary cap analyst and pro personnel assistant. She was promoted to manager of football administration in June 2003. While with the Jets, she was mentored by Mike Tannenbaum, Bill Parcells, and Bill Belichick.

=== National Football League ===
Aponte became the vice president of labor finance for the National Football League's management council in 2006, and stayed in that position for three years.

=== Cleveland Browns ===
Aponte was the vice president of football administration and top contract negotiator for the Cleveland Browns in 2009.

=== Miami Dolphins ===
She resigned from the team to become the senior vice president of football operations for the Miami Dolphins in February 2010. She was promoted to executive vice president of football administration in 2012, and worked with general manager Jeff Ireland on player contract negotiations until 2014. She began reporting to general manager Dennis Hickey when he was hired in January 2014. In 2014, Aponte was one of two female vice presidents on NFL teams, along with Katie Blackburn of the Cincinnati Bengals. Mike Tannenbaum was promoted to executive vice president of football operations of the Dolphins in February 2015, and Aponte started reporting directly to owner Stephen M. Ross. She left the Dolphins in September 2016 to become a business development executive at RSE Ventures, a private investment firm founded by Ross.

=== National Football League (2nd stint) ===
Aponte was hired by the NFL league office to become their chief administrator of football operations in June 2017. She became the highest-ranked woman in NFL football operations with the appointment. On the third day of the televised 2020 NFL draft, she and NFL executive Dave Gardi replaced commissioner Roger Goodell in announcing draft picks from their homes during the COVID-19 pandemic. She continued announcing selections during the 2021 NFL draft.

Aponte interviewed with the Los Angeles Chargers for their general manager position in January 2024.

=== New York Giants ===
The New York Giants hired Aponte as the team's senior vice president of football operations and strategy on February 4, 2026.

== Personal ==
Aponte is married with four children. Aponte was a guest speaker at the NFL Career Development Symposium in May 2013. She was named to the USA Football board of directors on October 17, 2013. In March 2016, she spoke at the first NFL Women's Career Development Symposium.

Jennifer Garner's character in the 2014 film Draft Day is loosely based on Aponte.
