= State Line Serpentine Barrens =

Eastern U.S. protected area

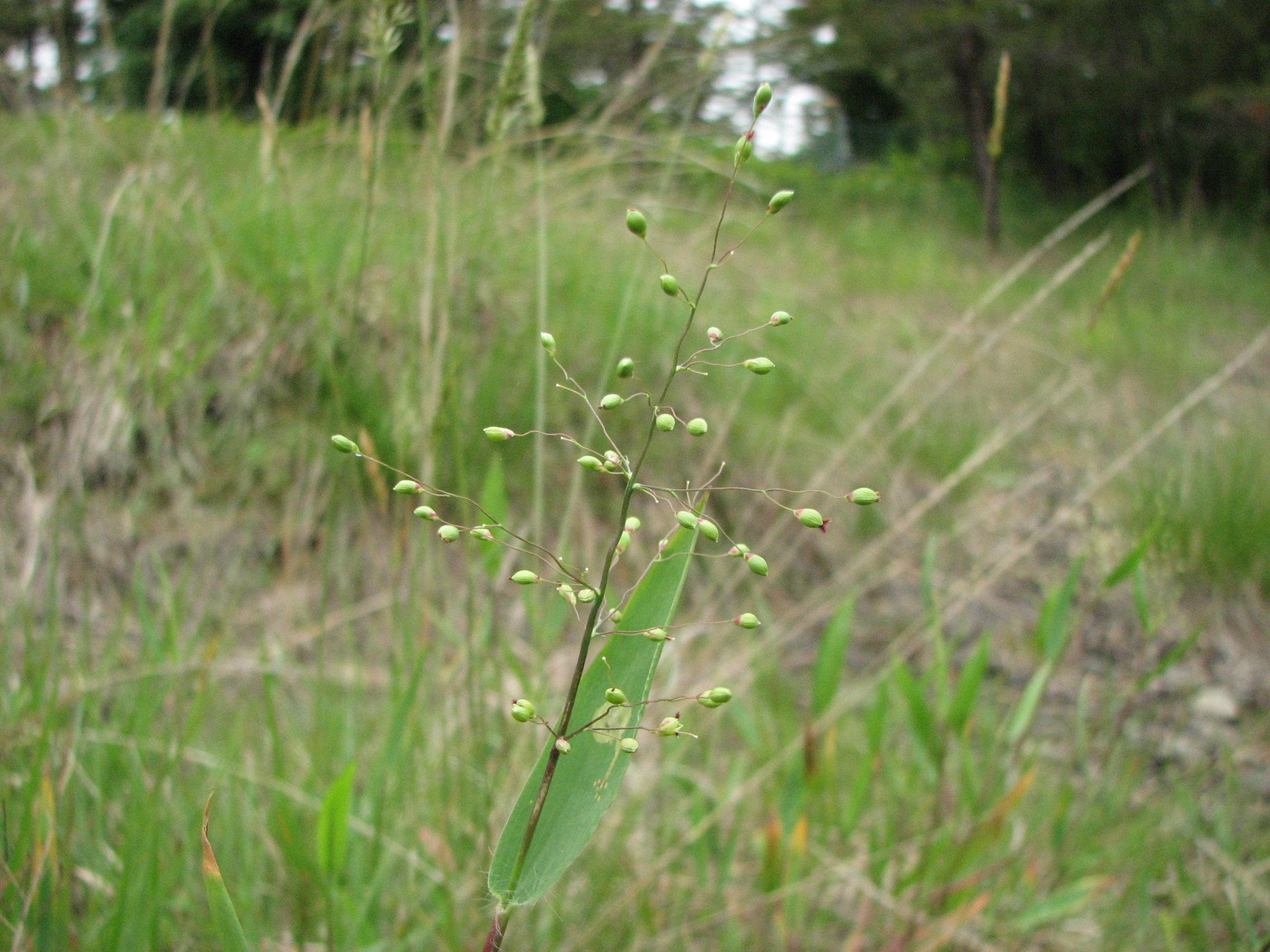
- Serpentine aster grows at the serpentine barrens in Pennsylvania
- Interactive map of State Line Serpentine Barrens
- Coordinates: 39°44′N 76°00′W

U.S. National Natural Landmark
- Designated: 2009

State Line Serpentine Barrens is a 60-square-mile (160 km^{2}) tract of serpentine barrens in Pennsylvania and Maryland in the eastern United States. The protected area is actually an assemblage of six tracts owned by a combination of the Nature Conservancy, the State of Pennsylvania, two counties, a township, and private owners. The largest tract is Nottingham County Park in Chester County, which has also been deemed a National Natural Landmark. The second-largest is Goat Hill Serpentine Barrens, jointly owned by the Nature Conservancy and the Pennsylvania Forestry Department (as a unit of William Penn State Forest), and the third-largest, Chrome Serpentine Barrens, is jointly owned by Elk Township and the Nature Conservancy. Rock Springs Preserve in Lancaster County is managed by the Lancaster Conservancy.

The site has been named an Outstanding Geologic Feature of Pennsylvania. In the 19th century, the Pennsylvania–Maryland serpentine barrens were mined for chromite and magnesite. Other serpentine barrens in the mid-Atlantic region of North America include Soldiers Delight Barrens in Maryland and some scattered sites on Staten Island, including Serpentine Ridge Nature Preserve.
