= William Horrmann =

American businessman

William Horrmann (1863–1927) was an American businessman from Staten Island, New York. He was the eldest son of German immigrant August Horrmann, who co-founded the Rubsam & Horrmann Brewing Company on Staten Island in 1871. William later ran the family business on Broad Street in the Stapleton neighborhood.

== Business career ==
Due to the good quality of the water in Staten Island, Stapleton boasted many breweries in its past. The Rubsam & Horrmann Brewing Company was one of the largest on the Island, the longest-lasting and most-successful brewery in the region, and was still being operated by Piels Beer until 1963. Rubsam & Horrmann was revived in 2019 by Brian "Q" Quinn, a member of The Tenderloins from Impractical Jokers.

== Family and castle ==
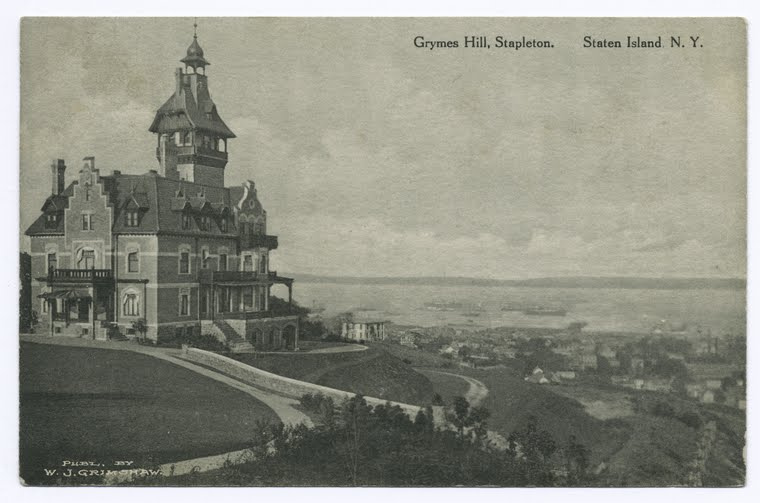
Horrmann Castle

The Horrmanns became wealthy and in 1910, William built Horrmann Castle at 189 Howard Avenue on Grymes Hill, near the present Eddy Street. The estate consisted of about 11 acres (4.5 ha) of land. The estate's design was inspired by the castles on the Rhine river in Germany, the country of origin of the Horrmanns. On the estate at 320 feet (98 m) above sea level, atop the mansion Horrmann built a "crow's nest" making the height of the house 120 feet (37 m). From the observation tower 440 feet (134 m) above sea level, it offered panoramic views of New York Harbor, as the horizon line could be seen in all directions.

The estate was later sold in 1945 to the Roman Catholic Presentation Sisters of Staten Island, who used it as their Mother House for 20 years. The castle proved to be very costly and difficult to maintain, and in 1965, the nuns sold the estate for $225,000. The building was torn down in 1968 after unsuccessful appeals for landmark protection. Some consider its demolition to be Staten Island's greatest architectural loss.

Despite the castle's demolition, the family name lives on, in the Horrmann Library of nearby Wagner College. The Horrmann Foundation provided a $100,000 gift to build the library in 1961.

== Other activities ==
William Horrmann was one of the directors of the Stapleton National Bank in Staten Island, considered among the most successful and influential businessmen who enjoyed the respect and confidence of the local community.
