= John J. Cisco =

Merchant and government official (b. 1806, d. 1884)

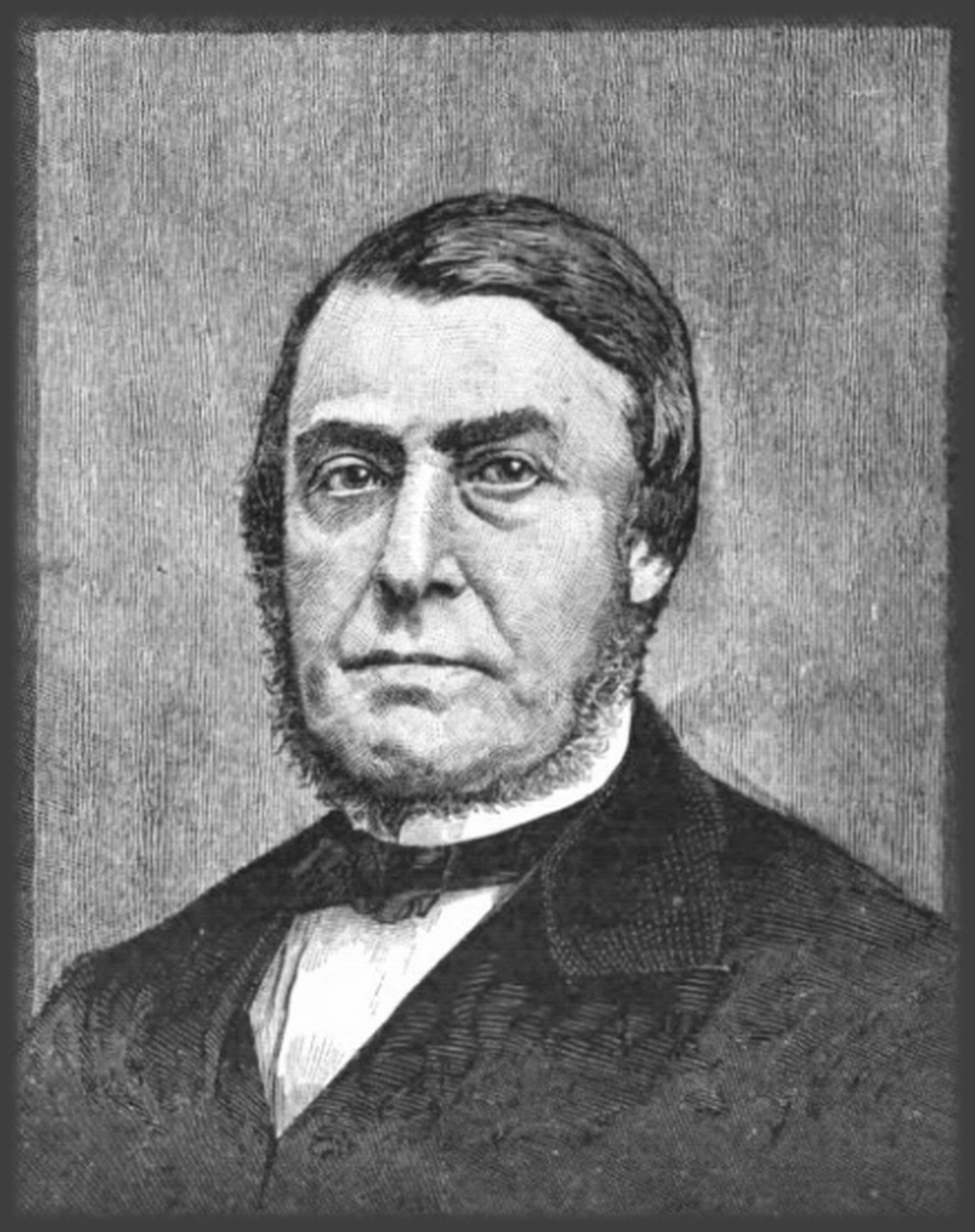
- Born: 1806
- Died: 1884 (aged 77–78)

John Jay Cisco (April 26, 1806 - March 23, 1884), was a merchant in the dry goods business in New York City, who retired at the age of thirty-six with a fortune. Some eleven years later, in 1853 President Franklin Pierce appointed Cisco to the office of Assistant Treasurer of the United States, and placed in charge of the Sub-Treasury in New York. He was later also appointed to this office by President James Buchanan. After serving under two Democratic Presidents, Cisco expected to be replaced by the incoming Republican administration of President Lincoln, but was kept on. He served under Lincoln until the sprint of 1864, when Cisco resigned the post due to poor health. He had a city named after him (Cisco, TX) due to his enormous help in the construction of Dallas and Houston.

== Family and residence ==
He had four children and three marriages. He married Maria Devoo, Mary Anne Cregier and Eliza Porter Sandford. His children were: Maria Devo, Sarah Jane, John Ashfield, and Caroline Augusta. They lived in a house on Grymes Hill in Staten Island, New York erected in 1855 by Ernest Cazet, with grounds designed by Frederick Law Olmsted, the noted landscape architect.

== Other activities ==
After his retirement as Assistant Treasurer of the United States, at the insistence of President Lincoln, he was appointed government director and treasurer of the Union Pacific Railroad.

== Bibliography ==
=== References ===
- Bayles, Richard Mather (January 1, 1887). History of Richmond County (Staten Island), New York: From Its Discovery to the Present Time. L.E. Preston.
1. Via Google Books (University of Wisconsin–Madison).
- Hine, Charles Gilbert (1859–1931) (1914). History and Legend of Howard Avenue and the Serpentine Road: Grymes Hill, Staten Island. Privately printed, Hine Brothers Printery. LCCN 15-23141; OCLC 12042501 (all editions).
1. Via Internet Archive (Library of Congress).
- Lamb, Martha Joanna (née Martha Joanna Nash; 1826–1893) (1883). Wall Street in History. New York: Funk & Wagnalls.
1. Chapter III: "1830–1883; The Great Money Center".
  1. Via Wikisource.
  2. Via Internet Archive (University of Virginia).
- Report on the Subject of a Sinking Fund for the General Pacific Railroad Companies; Together with the Acts of Congress, Decisions of Courts, and Documents Relating to Said Railroad Companies (re: John J. Cisco). Government Printing Office. 1876. p. 85.
1. Via Internet Archive (Library of Congress).
