= Oroondates Mauran =

Businessperson (b. 1791, d. 1846)

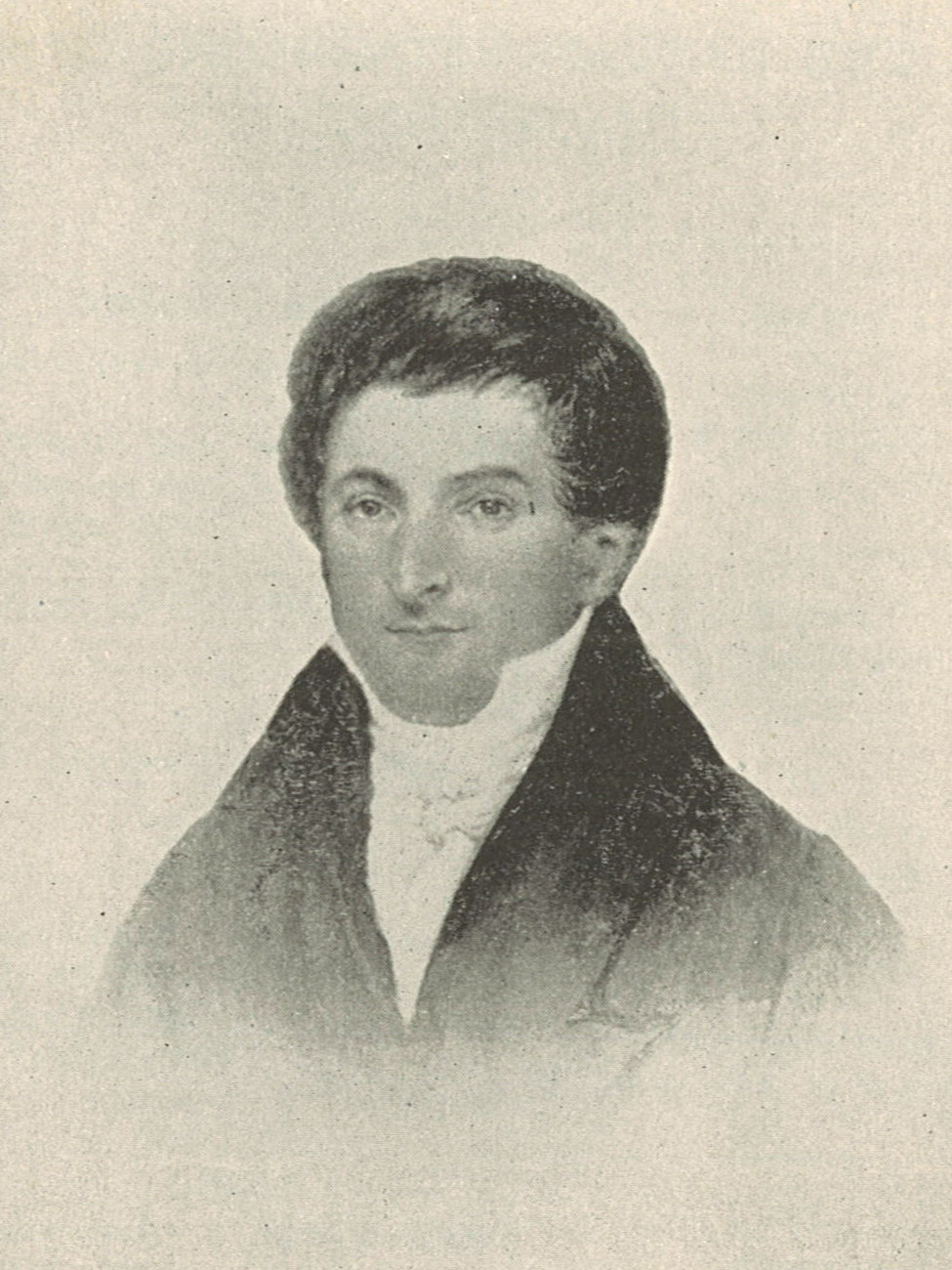
Oroondates Mauran

Oroondates Mauran (1791-1846) was a businessman in New York City who owned steamship and ferry operations.

== Early life ==
Mauran was born in Barrington, Rhode Island, the eighth child of Joseph Carlo and Olive (Bicknell) Mauran. His father commanded two armed ships during the American Revolution.

== Business career ==
He moved to New York City when he was 19 to become a merchant. Together with his partner Samuel Coates, he established the firm Coates & Mauran which owned ships that carried cargo from New York to the West Indies. In 1822, he also entered into a venture to run regularly scheduled ships between New York City and Charleston, South Carolina.

Mauran bought a 50% stake in the Richmond Turnpike Company, which had been founded by Staten Island resident and United States Vice-President Daniel D. Tompkins. The company also operated the first steam boat ferry between Manhattan and Staten Island which became known simply as the Staten Island Ferry.

In 1848 he was involved in a court case related to one of the Turnpike ships, the Sampson, which also had participated in a ramming battle with a rival ferry on September 2, 1838. It was alleged in court that Mauran expressly approved of the ramming and even expressed regret the captain had not sunk the rival Wave.

Mauran and Cornelius Vanderbilt gained control of the Turnpike company in 1838 after Thomkins died. However the Richmond Turnpike Company was set to expire (having a limited duration by statute) so the partners assigned the equipment and real estate leases to themselves. The whole affair was bogged down in the courts for years but the $50,000 annual profit made the business worth fighting for. Mauran managed the company as President. The same year Mauran died, Vanderbilt bought from his estate his shares in the Staten Island Ferry for $80,000.

== Family ==
Mauran married Martha Eddy in 1814 in Providence, Rhode Island. She was the daughter of Samuel Eddy, a Member of Congress, 1819-1825 and Rhode Island Chief Justice, 1827-1835. They had a daughter Josephine, (d. 1858) who married Oliver Wolcott Gibbs, Rumford Professor at Harvard. Their eldest son, James Eddy Mauran (1817-1888), married Alice Cooper, a niece of James Fenimore Cooper. James became a noted bibliophile, linguist, antiquarian, and expert on heraldry. He was President of the Redwood Library in Newport, Rhode Island.

== Other activities ==
Mauran lived in Manhattan in winter and on Staten Island in the summer. He purchased his Staten Island residence on Grymes Hill in 1831.

He was part of the founding of the first Italian Opera House in New York at the corner of Church and Lombard streets, opened November 18, 1833 at a cost of over $100,000. The theatre burned down in 1839 after being unsuccessfully offered for sale at a time when opera was a novelty in America. He was one of the oldest members of the Union Club of the City of New York.
