= Cameron's Line =

Suture fault in the northeast United States

Cameron's Line is an Ordovician suture fault in the northeast United States that formed as part of the continental collision known as the Taconic orogeny around 450 million years ago. Named after geologist Eugene N. Cameron, who first published a description in the 1950s, it ties together the North American continental craton, the prehistoric Taconic island volcanic arc, and the bottom of the ancient Iapetus Ocean. Cameron himself credited his colleague William M. Agar with the initial discovery.

== Location ==
Cameron's Line winds southward out of New England through western Connecticut. It has been identified in western Connecticut near Ridgefield before it heads into Westchester County, New York, then the Bronx, along the East River in Manhattan, through New York Bay, Staten Island, and into New Jersey.

== Geology ==
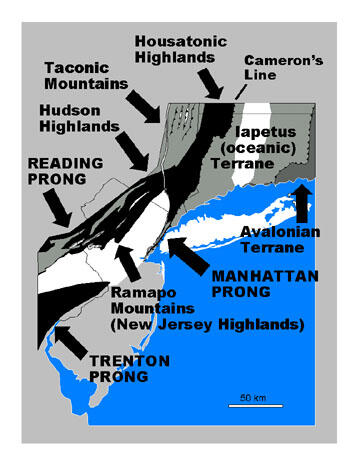
Geology of the New York City Region – Highlands Province

The basement rocks of the Manhattan Formation located on the western side of Cameron's Line are metamorphosed sedimentary rocks and can be thought of as the remnants of the edge of the North American continent from 1 billion years ago. They were formed in roughly this location (autochthonous) and have been tectonically stable over a long period. Through New England, generally, the rocks to the west of Cameron's Line are the remnants of an enormous mountain range (the Grenville orogeny), sometimes called the "Crystalline Appalachians", which once stretched from Newfoundland to Mexico, the local remnants of which are exposed and create the Housatonic Highlands, the New Jersey Highlands (Ramapo Mountains), and the thin Manhattan Prong (including much of the Bronx).

In general, to the east of the line are allochthonous rocks formed elsewhere, which have experienced great tectonic movement in a westward direction on top of the underlying bedrock. In the geological past, around 450 million years ago, an ocean similar to the Atlantic began to shrink. As it did, the North American continent began to collide with island chains, which accreted at the edge of the continent and formed the land of what we now call New England.

The major exceptions to this directionality are the southerly remnants of these ancient collisions around New York Bay, the serpentinite outcrops that form Hoboken, New Jersey, and Todt Hill, Staten Island. These actually lie both east and west of Cameron's Line because it makes a sharp U-turn, heading south from Manhattan into Staten Island and hooking back north into Hudson County, New Jersey. Indeed, near New York City the term "line" becomes less applicable and its position is subject to much debate, because the boundary has been warped and folded into a complex three-dimensional shape by multiple tectonic episodes. After the Taconic orogeny, a collision with Africa (the Alleghanian orogeny) created the supercontinent Pangaea, which was later split by the rifting process that created the Atlantic Ocean, Ramapo Fault, Newark Basin, and the Palisades. The material in Cameron's Line is described as "highly laminated, migmatized, complexly folded and annealed zones of commingled mylonitic rocks".
