= Garibaldi-Meucci Museum =

Historic house in Staten Island, New York

- Garibaldi Memorial
- U.S. National Register of Historic Places
- New York City Landmark
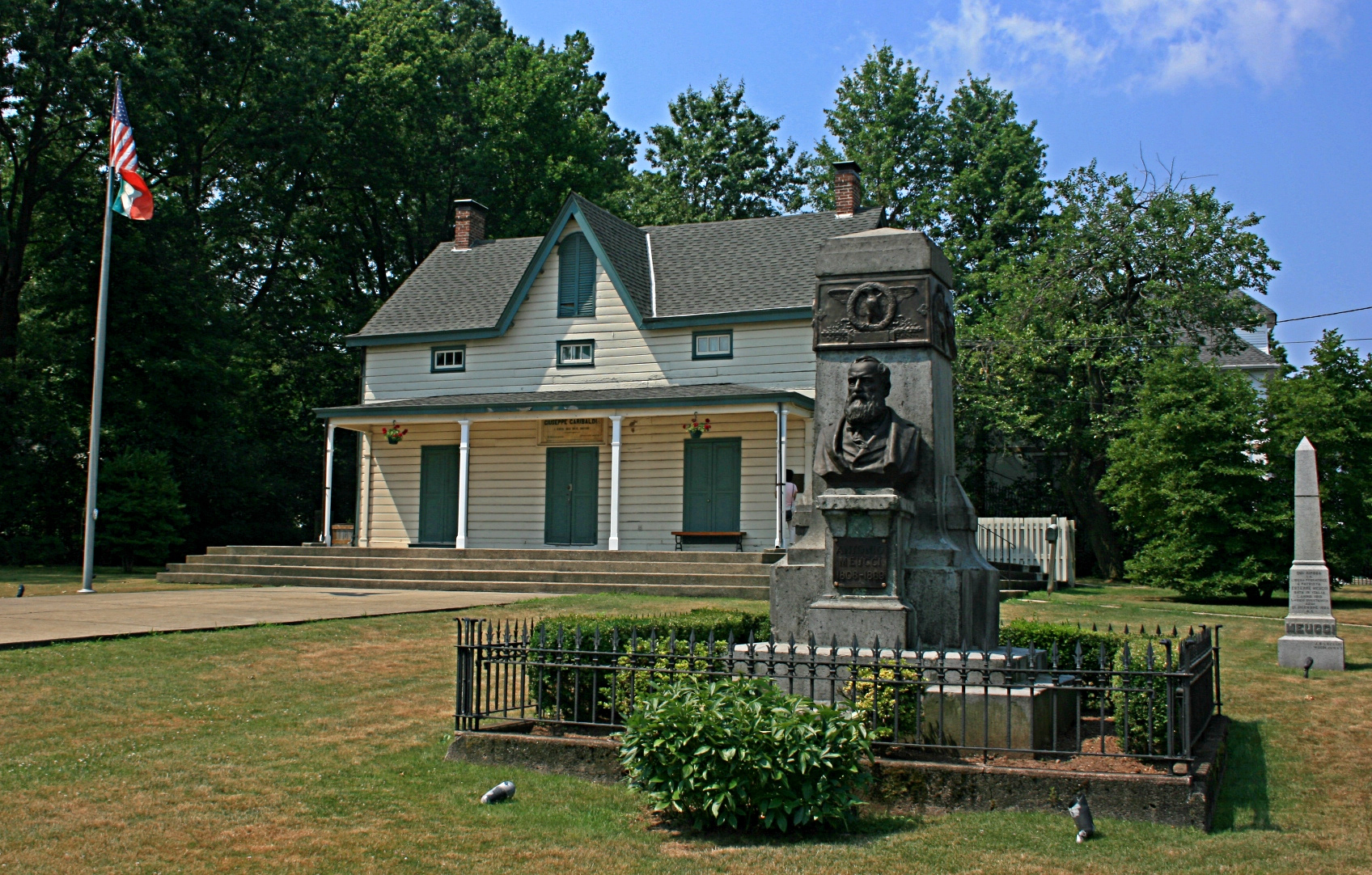

- Location within New York City Location within New York Location within the United States
- Location: 420 Tompkins Avenue; Staten Island, New York
- Coordinates: 40°36′54″N 74°4′25″W
- Built: c. 1840
- Architectural style: Gothic Revival
- NRHP reference No.: 80002758
- NYCL No.: 0377

Significant dates
- Added to NRHP: April 17, 1980
- Designated NYCL: May 25, 1967

The Garibaldi-Meucci Museum, formerly known as the Garibaldi Memorial, is a c. 1840 Gothic Revival cottage in the Rosebank section of Staten Island, New York. It was home to inventor and candle maker Antonio Meucci (1808–1889). The Italian revolutionary and political leader Giuseppe Garibaldi (1807–1882) lived there from 1851 to 1853.

In 1884, Meucci attended a ceremony where a plaque commemorating Garibaldi's stay was placed on the building. The house was moved from its original nearby location in 1907 and placed within an open air colonnaded memorial pavilion, which was later removed. The memorial was dedicated in 1907 to mark Garibaldi's 100th birthday. Since then, on the anniversary of Garibaldi's birth, by coincidence the Fourth of July, the site has been the location of a number of celebrations.

A memorial to Meucci was erected in the front yard in 1923. The site also saw a series of anniversary clashes in the years 1925-1932, when the Italian Ambassador Giacomo De Martino's participation was protested by antifascist followers of Carlo Tresca. In 1956 the house was opened as the Garibaldi-Meucci Museum, helping to celebrate Italian-American heritage and culture, as well as the lives of Giuseppe Garibaldi and Antonio Meucci. The museum is owned by the National Order Sons of Italy Foundation and administered by the New York Grand Lodge Order Sons of Italy in America.

After a major restoration, the museum was rededicated in a ceremony on July 11, 2009, involving museum president John Dabbene, Salvatore Lanzilotta, president of the New York State Order of the Sons of Italy in America, and U.S. Congressional Representative Michael McMahon.

The site was listed on the U.S. National Register of Historic Places in 1980.

== See also ==
- Casa Belvedere, another landmark in Staten Island related to the Italian-American experience.
- List of New York City Designated Landmarks in Staten Island
- National Register of Historic Places listings in Richmond County, New York
