= Ceil Chapman =

American fashion designer (1912–1979)

- Born: Cecilia Mitchell; February 19, 1912; Staten Island, New York
- Died: July 13, 1979 (aged 67); The Bronx, New York
- Education: Notre Dame Academy
- Occupation: Fashion designer
- Spouses: Peter Fitzgibbon; Samuel Chapman (m. 1938; div. 1950); Tom Rogers (m. 1951; died 1979)
- Children: 1

Ceil Chapman (née Mitchell; February 19, 1912 – July 13, 1979) was an American fashion designer who worked in New York City from the 1940s to the 1960s. She created glamorous cocktail and party dresses, and worked with celebrity clients including television and movie actresses.

== Designs and career ==
After two years of college, she obtained a position in the workroom of a large Fifth Avenue store in New York. Within three years, she was made head of the studio, staying for eight years. Around 1940, Chapman was involved in a short-lived business called Her Ladyship Gowns, formed with Gloria Morgan Vanderbilt and her sister, Thelma Furness, Viscountess Furness.

Chapman patented numerous designs between 1954 and 1960.

=== Awards ===
Ceil Chapman was given the Coty American Fashion Critic's Award in 1945, for her creative contribution to the American fashion picture. She also was the recipient of the John Wanamaker Award, Foley's "Golden Year" Award, and the Strawbridge and Clothier seal of confidence, for creative contribution in the area of American fashion. Around 1949 Ceil Chapman made an informal deal to lend clothes to NBC TV shows in exchange for program credit. Chapman was approached by a young staff costume designer, Joan Feldman, at NBC who was frustrated at the lack of resources for modern clothing for stars of dramatic shows like Betty Furness. That designer, now known by her married name, Joan Kron, believes it was the first clothing deal for credit on television. In 1955, Chapman won the Mademoiselle Merit Award, after a poll asking college girls to cite the country's most popular designer for the young. She won by a landslide. In 1956, she won the "Best of Informals" award from the Swiss Fabrics group.

Chapman worked at 530 Seventh Avenue in New York's Garment District during the 1950s. A photo portrait of the designer at work in her studio appeared in a 1956 advertisement for Western Union. Chapman also lent her name to promotions for products including Cadillac automobiles and Maidenform girdles.

Ceil Chapman was reportedly Marilyn Monroe's favorite fashion designer. She provided the trousseau for Elizabeth Taylor's 1950 wedding to Conrad "Nicky" Hilton. Other celebrity clients included Deborah Kerr, Greer Garson, Grace Kelly and Aretha Franklin. Chapman worked on Marie McDonald's wardrobe for the 1963 film Promises! Promises! In 1952, Betty Furness appeared at a function wearing a Ceil Chapman dress. Ms. Chapman was also there, wearing an identical dress. She reportedly "sashayed back to the powder room, checked the jacket part of the dress, removed the big organza bow at the neckline, and returned to her sirloin looking absolutely different."

By November 1968, Ceil Chapman Inc. was located at 200 Park Avenue. At that time, the company registered with the Securities and Exchange Commission to offer shares of common stock, proposing "to engage principally in the styling, designing, manufacture, distribution and sale of women's wearing apparel, accessories and novelties under the name 'Ceil Chapman,' and to license others to use the Ceil Chapman name." Some 1960s dresses bear the label "CEIL CHAPMAN / for Miss Winston". A perfume or cologne, Ceil Bleue, may also date from the 1960s.

The Staten Island Historical Society's collections include a labeled Ceil Chapman evening gown with a bodice of multicolored pastel lace and a long, full skirt of powder-pink tulle. Several of Chapman's designs, including a 1948 wedding dress, a late 1940s dress, and three 1950s cocktail dresses, are in the collection of the Costume Institute of the Metropolitan Museum of Art. These designs show Chapman's interest in the draping and layering of fabric to highlight the female form.

Ceil Chapman's designs have been compared with those of Anne Fogarty, Nettie Rosenstein, and Norman Norell. Chapman was among those who succeeded in adapting Christian Dior's "New Look" for relatively affordable cocktail wear targeted toward the American ready-to-wear market. Her labels featured the words "ORIGINAL / Chapman / DESIGN", "a Chapman original", or simply, "Ceil Chapman".

== Personal life ==
As a young girl, Chapman designed and made her own clothes. She made her first formal dress when she was 15 years old. Later, she was an art student at St. Mary's and St. Peter's Schools on Staten Island, as well as at Notre Dame Academy. According to her son, Peter Chapman, Ceil Chapman had no formal design training, but learned by working as a "buyer and business woman in the fashion industry". She wore exclusively black during the day, and almost always wore white for evening functions. She never attended French fashion shows, preferring not to be influenced by Paris when designing for American woman.

Born Cecilia Mitchell on Staten Island on February 19, 1912, she spent her childhood in Rosebank. She moved to Manhattan with her family as a teenager, but the family maintained a residence and continued to spend summer holidays on Staten Island. Little is known about Chapman's first husband, Peter Fitzgibbon. Their son, Peter, later took the surname of his adoptive father. Chapman's second husband, Samuel Chapman, was also her business partner during the early years of her career. They married in June 1938 and divorced in Mexico in October 1950. Chapman noted that "being together 24 hours a day took a toll on me. He controlled my business and my personal life." She stated that their relationship was much better after they divorced, though Samuel continued to manage the business. She married her third husband, Tom Rogers, in December 1951.

Chapman died at Calvary Hospital in the Bronx after a two-year illness with lung cancer on Friday, July 13, 1979. At the time, she had been living on the Upper East Side of Manhattan. Her obituary in the Staten Island Advance reported that she had not been informed of the death of her husband, Tom Rogers, just a few days earlier. At the time of her death, she was survived by her son, Peter, and two sisters.
