= Grymes Hill, Staten Island =

Hill and neighborhood in New York City

- Location within New York City Location within New York

Highest point
- Coordinates: 40°37′4.79″N 74°05′22.20″W

Grymes Hill is a 374 feet (114 m) tall hill formed of serpentine rock on Staten Island, New York. It is the second highest natural point on the island and in the five boroughs of New York City. The neighborhood of the same name encompasses an area of 0.894 square miles (2.32 km^{2}) and has a population of 8,263 people. The hill also includes parts of the Silver Lake neighborhood. The area includes part of ZIP Codes 10301 and 10304.

== Etymology ==
The hill is named after Cayetana Susana "Suzette" (née Bosque) Claiborne Grymes, daughter of Felicidad Fangui and Bartolomé Bosque, and wife of prominent New Orleans lawyer and member of the First Families of Virginia, John Randolph Grymes. Her first husband was the first governor of Louisiana, William Charles Cole Claiborne. She settled on Staten Island in 1836.

Her daughter Athenais Grymes married New York banker, Louis A. von Hoffman, one of the founders of the Knickerbocker Club.

== Geography ==
Neighborhoods around Grymes Hill include Ward Hill to the north, Silver Lake to the west, Sunnyside and Emerson Hill to the south, to the southeast is Concord, and Stapleton and Stapleton Heights to the east. The east side of the hill is defined by Van Duzer Street and Richmond Road to the intersection with the Staten Island Expressway, which, with Clove Road, defines the southern side. On the west is Victory Boulevard. Some claim Cebra Avenue for the northern border, while others believe that the border is Louis Street.

Grymes Hill, Staten Island

=== Topology ===
Grymes Hill, which has views of Lower New York Bay and the Narrows, is the second highest point on Staten Island after Todt Hill, reaching its greatest elevation of 374 feet (114 m) above sea level. Hero Park, 3 acres (12,000 m^{2}) in size, is located at the intersection of Victory Boulevard and Louis Street, abutting the Notre Dame Academy property. The areas hillsides and trees are protected by the Special Hillsides Preservation Zoning District which went into effect in 1987. The Serpentine Art and Nature Commons ("SANC") owns and maintains several trails on preservation land. Ownership of 11.5 acres (47,000 m^{2}) of the hillside was assumed by the Trust for Public Land. They encouraged concerned neighbors to form SANC to maintain and improve the land as a nature preserve open to the community.

Starting in the mid-19th century, breweries dug caves into the hill to use in the production of beer. Some of these caves off of Van Duzer Street were later incorporated into a popular restaurant, which provided catering for the movie The Godfather during shooting on Staten Island. The restaurant has since closed, and the entire site was redeveloped with a townhouse complex.

=== Geology ===
Grymes Hill was carved by a receding glacier. The Staten Island Serpentinite, which is the serpentine or soapstone area that extends from New Brighton to Richmond, includes the hill country of the island. In places where glacial erosion was limited the stone weathered into a soft, yellowish, fractured condition to which the name "soapstone" is applied, but where the weathered stone was eroded the rock is hard and dense in texture and dark green in color. The rock's green, yellow or brown colors are often mottled with red.

== History ==
The area was originally named Signal Hill after a British signal station. Deeds of 1836 and thereabout show that the hill was known as Castleton Heights. Grymes Hill was part of a land grant in 1687 to Thomas Dongan, who served as Governor of the Province of New York. Between the years 1830 and 1833 a local developer, Major George Howard, purchased 42 acres, which included all land between Eddy and Louis streets. Major Howard built many of the hill's earliest homes, and his name survives in Howard Avenue, the hill's main street; a portion of this street was known for a time as Serpentine Road due to the hill's bedrock consisting of serpentinite.

== Demographics ==
For census purposes, the New York City Department of City Planning classifies Grymes Hill as part of a larger Neighborhood Tabulation Area called West New Brighton-Silver Lake-Grymes Hill SI0104]. This designated neighborhood had 37,010 inhabitants based on data from the 2020 United States Census. This was an increase of 1,526 persons (4.3%) from the 35,484 counted in 2010. The neighborhood had a population density of 18.6 inhabitants per acre (14,500/sq mi; 5,600/km^{2}).

The racial makeup of the neighborhood was 45.0% (16,673) White (Non-Hispanic), 16.5% (6,116) Black (Non-Hispanic), 8.0% (2,975) Asian, and 4% (1,475) from two or more races. Hispanic or Latino of any race were 26.4% (9,771) of the population.

According to the 2020 United States Census, this area has many cultural communities of over 1,000 inhabitants. This include residents who identify as Mexican, Puerto Rican, English, German, Irish, Italian, Polish, African-American, and Chinese.

The largest age group was people 10-34 years old, which made up 33.8% of the residents. 66.5% of the households had at least one family present. Out of the 13,141 households, 41.9% had a married couple (18.1% with a child under 18), 5.7% had a cohabiting couple (2.1% with a child under 18), 19.6% had a single male (1.7% with a child under 18), and 32.8% had a single female (2.0% with a child under 18). 32.9% of households had children under 18. In this neighborhood, 47.4% of non-vacant housing units are renter-occupied.

As of 2017, the median household income in Community District 1 was $48,018. In 2018, an estimated 21% of Grymes Hill and the North Shore residents lived in poverty, compared to 17% in all of Staten Island and 20% in all of New York City. One in fourteen residents (7%) were unemployed, compared to 6% in Staten Island and 9% in New York City. Rent burden, or the percentage of residents who have difficulty paying their rent, is 51% in Grymes Hill and the North Shore, compared to the boroughwide and citywide rates of 49% and 51% respectively. Based on this calculation, as of 2018, Grymes Hill and the North Shore are considered high-income relative to the rest of the city and not gentrifying.

The neighborhood is mixed commercial and residential. Like many areas of the northeastern part of the island, it suffered a decline following the construction of the Verrazzano–Narrows Bridge in 1964, which shifted the commercial activity of the island towards its interior. Recent plans have called for the redevelopment of the harbor front area.

== Community ==
Grymes Hill is ranked the 4th safest neighborhood in New York City out of 229 according to Niche.

The median household income is in the top 15% in the United States. Howard Avenue on Grymes Hill is considered one of the most exclusive and most expensive areas of Staten Island.

=== Housing stock ===
Most homes in the neighborhood are private residences, many of which were constructed for Manhattan businessmen. The neighborhood has many fine homes dating from the 1920s that overlook New York Harbor.

Real estate developer Fred Trump constructed several hundred two- and three-bedroom residences in the late 1940s. These are 423 garden apartments along Howard Avenue and Arlo Road. Fred Trump's son, the developer and later U.S. president Donald Trump, sold these apartments to an unrelated corporation in 2007. Grymes Hill Manor Estates was built in 1953 as rental garden apartments, and switched to co-op status in 1983. It has 152 apartments centering on Seth Court, with many on both sides of Arlo Road, and a few on Howard Avenue and Stratford Avenue. Two high rise apartment buildings at the foot of Howard Avenue converted to condominiums following a major fire in one. There are several apartment buildings on Victory Boulevard. Two new apartment buildings have been constructed facing the Staten Island Expressway. One was turned into condominiums in 2004. The other is being offered as senior citizen housing.

== Green spaces ==
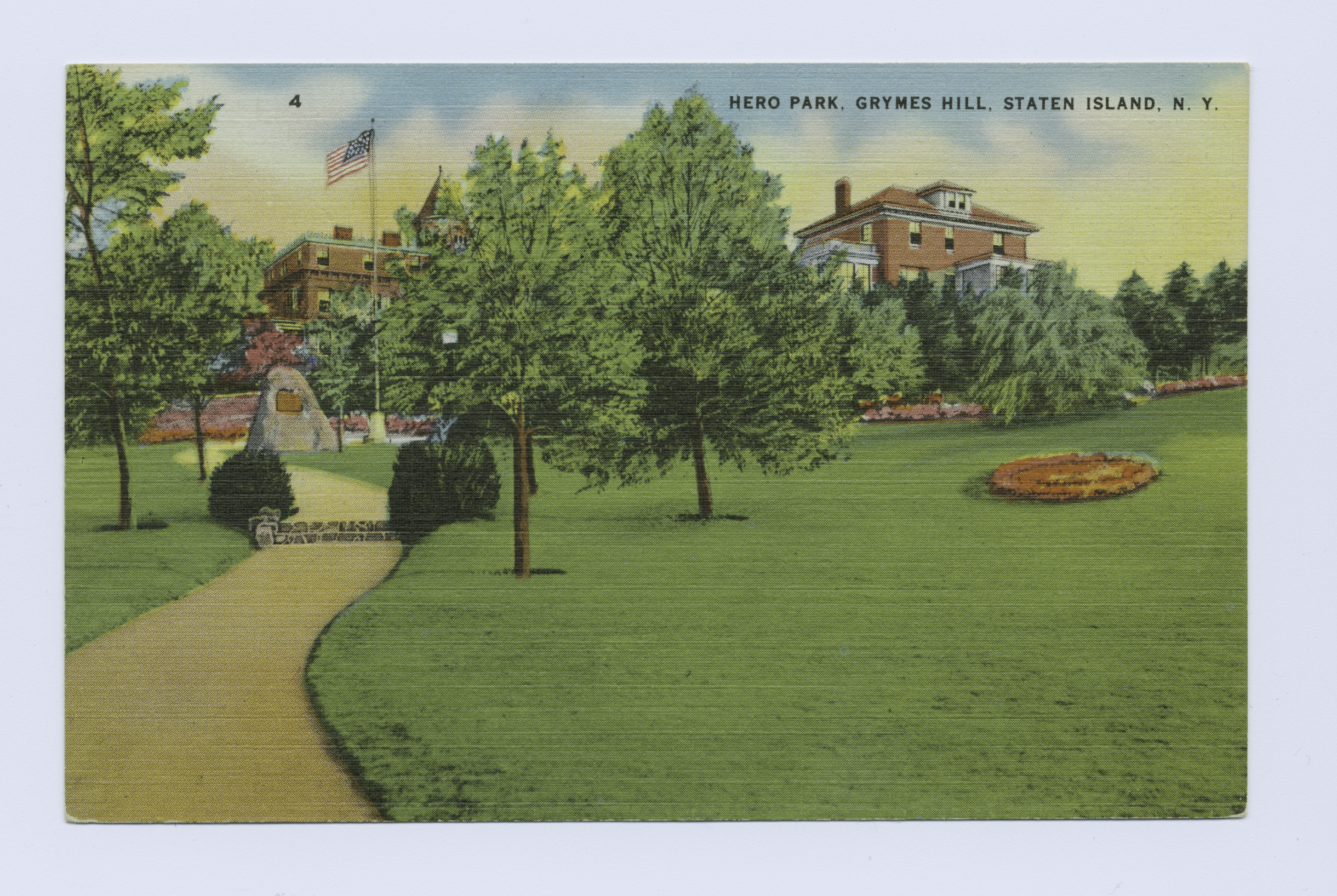
Hero Park

The only public park on Grymes Hill is Hero Park, a 2-acre park donated in 1920 by Dr. and Mrs. Louis A. Dreyfus. However, Grymes Hill residents are within walking distance of the sprawling Silver Lake Park, whose facilities include a running path, a golf course, and several public tennis courts. The neighborhood also borders Clove Lakes Park, with ponds, baseball fields, and a row-boating house among its amenities. Grymes Hill also includes a steep hillside, known as the Serpentine Ridge Nature Preserve and part of the Special Hillsides Preservation District, which is a heavily wooded land area which remains in a natural state and is covered with native trees and plants including several rare, special concern, endangered, and threatened species. The Serpentine Art and Nature Commons maintains several trails on parts of the hillsides, which are owned by the Trust for Public Land.

Grymes Hill includes two cemeteries, both located along Victory Boulevard. Woodland Cemetery dates back to the nineteenth century, and some headstones are in German, reflecting the population of the day. Silver Lake Cemetery also dates back to the nineteenth century, and was the original burial site for the Hebrew Free Burial Association.

== Education ==
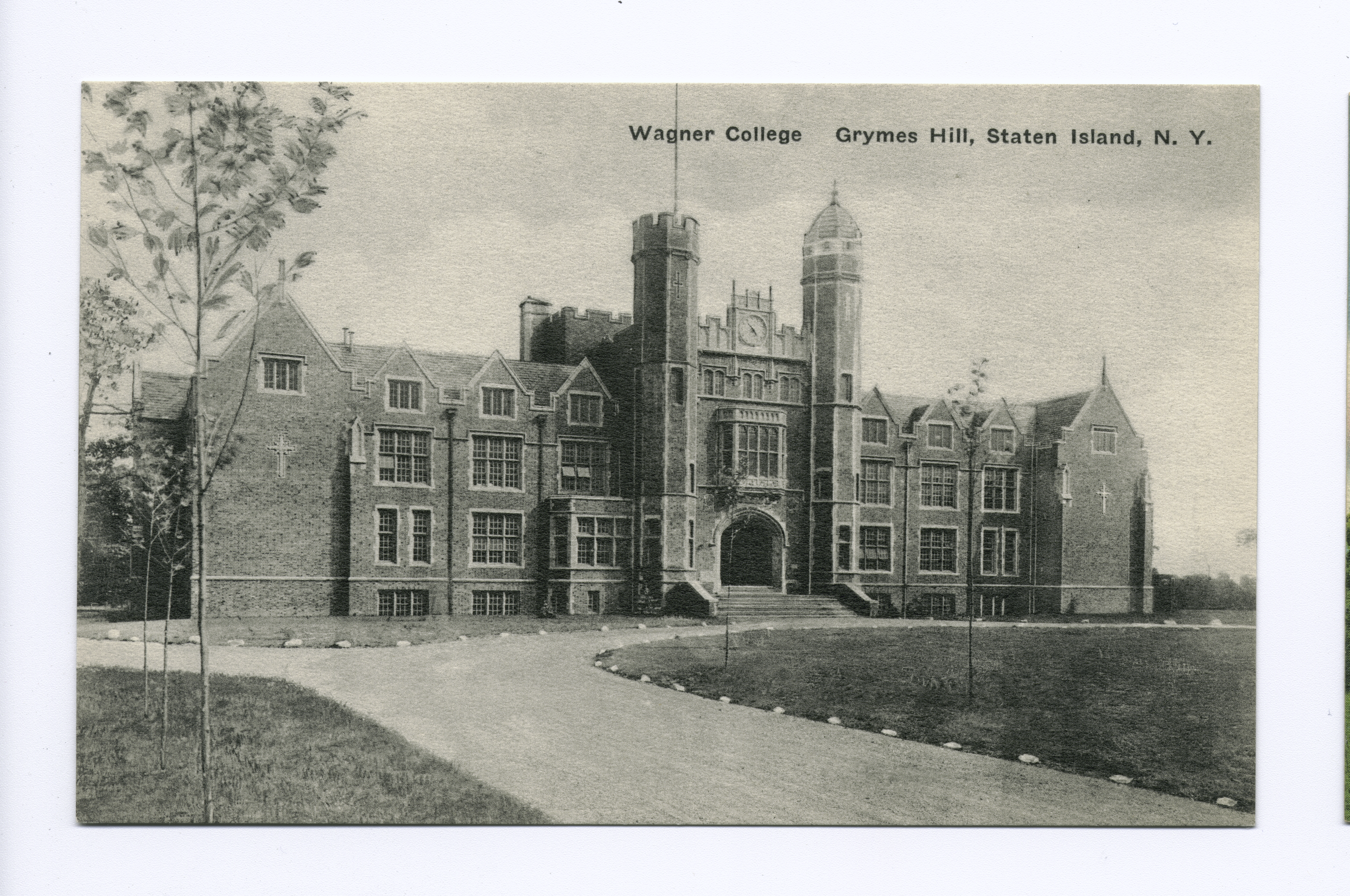
Wagner College

Grymes Hill is the home of two institutions of higher learning: Wagner College, and the Staten Island campus of St. John's University. The St. John's campus of 16.5 acres (67,000 m^{2}) was originally a small Catholic women's institution, Notre Dame College, which closed in 1971, when St. John's University took over the campus. The campus closed in May 2024 due to declining enrollment.

Also on the hill is Notre Dame Academy, a Roman Catholic elementary and high school for girls which received an overall A Grade by Niche.

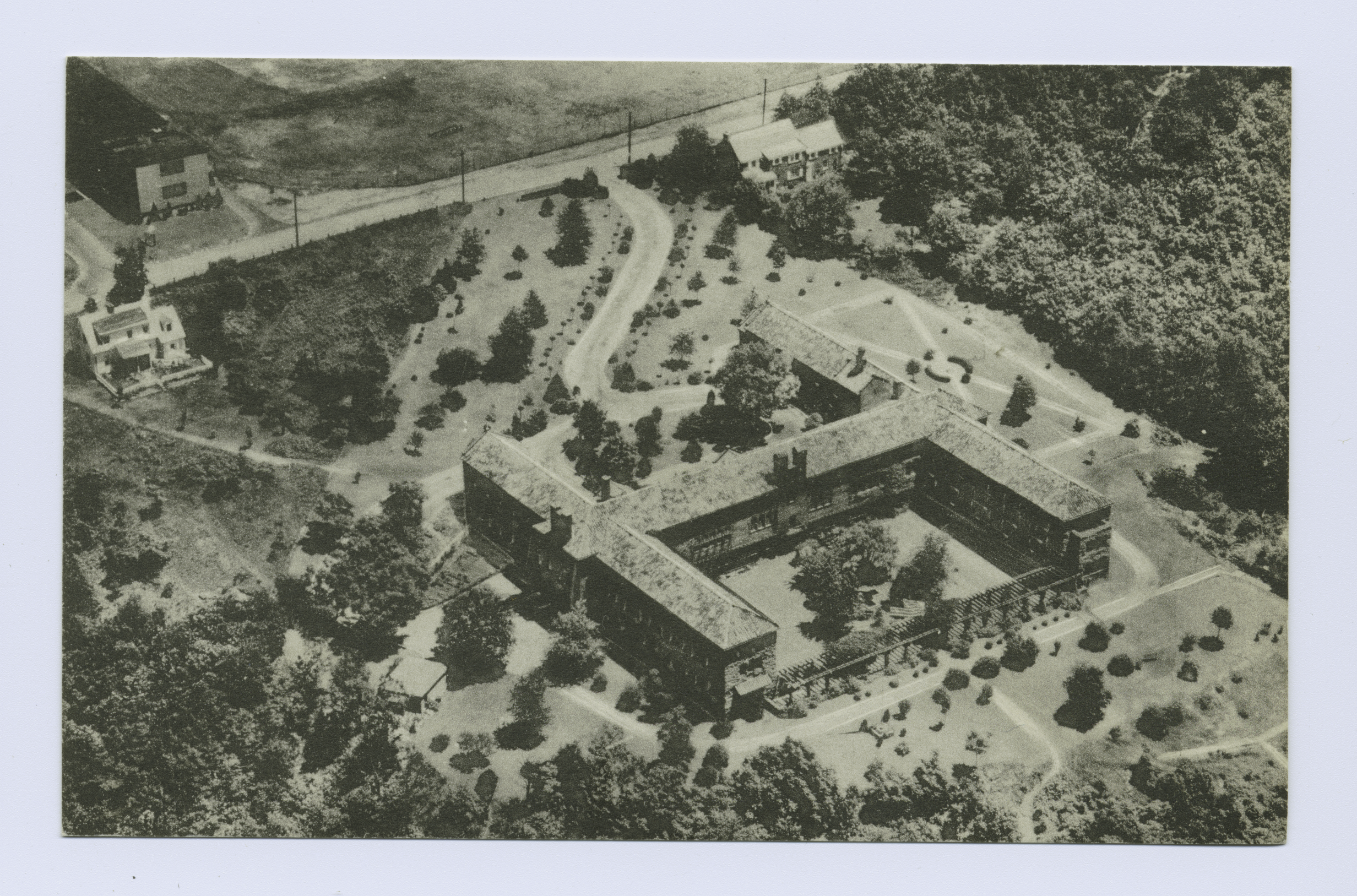
Augustinian Academy

Adjacent to (and owned by) Wagner College is the site of a former Roman Catholic high school, named Augustinian Academy after the order of friars who ran it; the school closed in 1969. Near the foot of the hill, on Foote Avenue, is P.S. 35, the Clove Valley School, a K-5 school which is ranked 10 out of 10 by GreatSchools.org, 85th of 2,395 New York elementary schools according to SchoolDigger and received an overall A Grade by Niche. Also located on Grymes Hill is Casa Belvedere, a center for Italian culture and studies in Italian language and culture which is located in the Louis A. and Laura Stirn House which was listed on the National Register of Historic Places in 2010, and designated a NYC Landmark in 2001.

== Transportation ==
Grymes Hill is served by the S53, S61, S62, S66, S91 and S92 local and limited buses. The SIM30 and SIM35 express buses provide rush-hour service to and from Manhattan.

== Notable past residents (by year of death) ==
- Governor Thomas Dongan (1634–1715) in 1687 was granted a 5,100-acre manor, of which Grymes Hill was a portion.
- Daniel D. Tompkins (1774–1825), an American politician and the sixth vice president of the United States. In 1815, he established a settlement along the eastern shore of the island with the purchase of the Van Buskirk Farm in New Brighton, and property on Grymes Hill. His main residence was located on Fort Hill, near Fort Place which burned down in 1874.
- Oroondates Mauran (1791–1846), a merchant of New York, who in subsequent years became the owner of the first Italian Opera House, purchased his Grymes Hill home in 1831. In winter he lived in Manhattan and in the summer on Staten Island. Furthermore, together with Cornelius Vanderbilt he owned the Staten Island Ferry. He was also one of the oldest members of the Union Club of the City of New York.
- Suzette Grymes, wife of the noted New Orleans lawyer John Randolph Grymes (1786–1854), bought land in 1836 around Howard Avenue and what is now Grymes Hill Road.
- Sir Edward Cunard, 2nd Baronet (1816–1869) of the shipping and passenger line family, built his mansion circa 1851. The 38-acre Grymes Hill family estate was named "Bellevue" and was built in the Italianate style. Cunard chose the land for its ocean view.
- Thomas Eakin (1822–1874), a banker and founder of the New York banking firm Thomas Eakin & Co., owned a house on Howard Avenue called "Eastover," which was designed by architect James Renwick Jr. about 1855 for Mr. Eakin. The home was later owned by James Morgan Davis.
- John J. Cisco (1806–1884), a merchant in the dry goods business in New York, who retired at the age of thirty-six with a fortune. Some eleven years later, in 1853, he was appointed by President Pierce, Assistant Treasurer of the United States, and placed in charge of the Sub-Treasury in New York. He purchase the house erected in 1855 by Ernest Cazet, under the superintendence of Frederick Law Olmsted, the noted landscape architect.
- Albert Brisbane (1809–1890), an American utopian socialist and popularized the theories of Charles Fourier. He was one of two sons born to James Brisbane, a wealthy landowner. His house was erected in 1854.
- Capt. Jacob Vanderbilt (1807–1893), brother of Cornelius "Commodore" Vanderbilt, built a mansion on Grymes Hill in the midst of wood and open land, covering a large area.
- General Thomas Jordan (1819–1895), owned the Unker dwelling, a 30-acre property with beautiful views.
- William Greene Ward (1832–1901), a banker and Civil War colonel whose 1867 mansion served as the Wagner College music building during 1949–1984.
- Edward King (1833–1908), President of the Union Trust Co. of New York, owned a house here.
- Charles Wallace Hunt (1841–1911), an inventor, business executive, and President of the American Society of Mechanical Engineers. He invented new methods in the storing and handling of coal. He purchased his residence on Grymes Hill in 1900.
- W. Butler Duncan I (1830–1912), a New York banker and railroad executive, in 1858 purchased a mansion on 20 acres of land from Madame Grymes.
- Mamie Fish (1853–1915), New York socialite and one of the so-called Triumvirate of American Gilded Age society
- John Gans (c.1867–1915), a steamship-company owner, built his family estate on the hill because it overlooked the New York Harbor where he operated his steamship company. St. John's University's Flynn Hall is the former home of John Gans.
- Louis A. Dreyfus (1867–1920), a local maker of chewing gum, built his former estate on what it is today part of the 13-acre Notre Dame Academy, an all-girls Catholic elementary and high school.
- George H. Kendall (c.1854–1924) was the president of the New York Bank Note Company, that printed stock certificates. He was also an art collector. He moved to Grymes Hill in 1896.

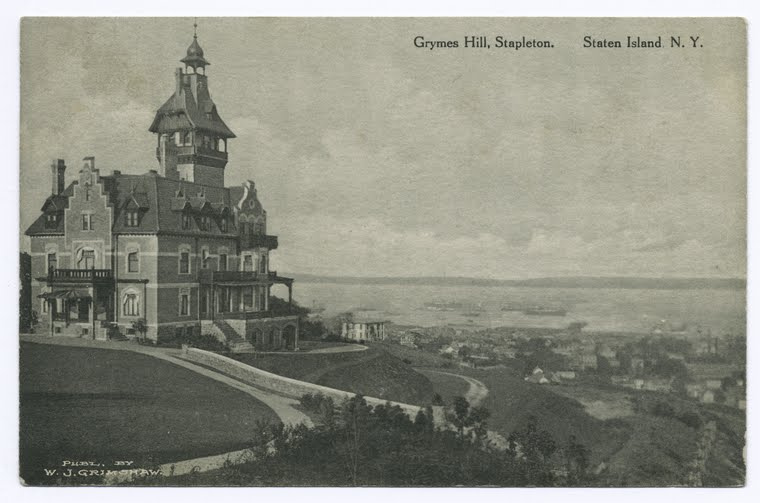
Horrmann Castle

- William Horrmann (1863–1927), owner of Stapleton's Rubsam & Horrmann Brewing Company, built Horrmann Castle at 189 Howard Avenue in 1910. The building was torn down in 1968.
- Edward W. Thompson (1864–1932), a millionaire sportsman and head of the Jas. Thompson & Sons Lumber Company, who built Thompson Stadium, a 9,000-seat facility on the island, resided at 72 Louis Street on Grymes Hill.
- William Butler Duncan II (1862–1933), a leader in American yacht racing and naval service, adopted son of W. Butler Duncan I.
- Prestonia Mann Martin and her husband John William Martin (c. 1864–1956), a wealthy Socialist family and members of the Fabian Society lived in their home at 37 Howard Avenue. The mansion was said to have many celebrities as guest at the home, among them, British novelist Charles Dickens and Soviet author Maxim Gorky.
- Louis A. Stirn (c.1864–1962), a silk importer, built his home in 1908 at 77 Howard Avenue. In 2006, the Stirn mansion became a New York City Landmark and is now called Casa Belvedere.
- James J. Murphy (1898–1962), a United States Representative from New York.

== Recent residents ==
- Eileen Farrell (1920–2002), Metropolitan opera star, moved to Staten Island from Connecticut in 1944. She lived with her family on Grymes Hill.
- Matthew J. Titone (1961– ) is an American politician and lawyer.
- Colin Jost (1982– ), comedic actor, writer and Weekend Update host for Saturday Night Live.
