= North Shore, Staten Island =

Area in New York City

Coordinates: 40.631°N 74.170°W

Community District Tabulation Area North Shore (SI01) with neighborhoods of Arlington, Castleton Corners, Clifton, Fox Hills, Graniteville, Grymes Hill, Mariner's Harbor, New Brighton, West New Brighton, Park Hill, Port Richmond, Rosebank, Shore Acres, Silver Lake, Snug Harbor, Stapleton, St. George, Tompkinsville, and Westerleigh'"`UNIQ--ref-00000002-QINU`"'

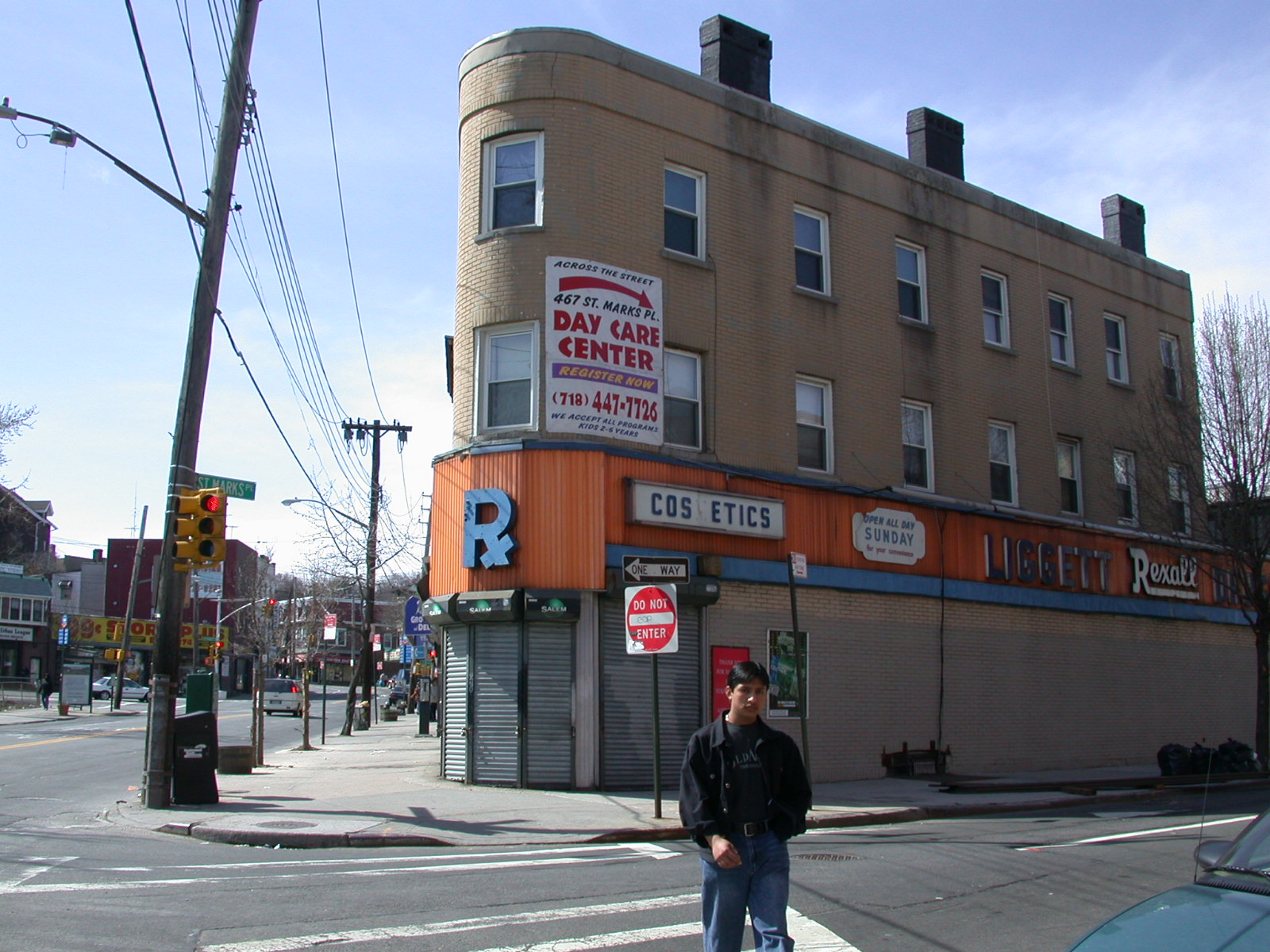
Looking northwest up Victory Boulevard, near Bay Street, on the North Shore

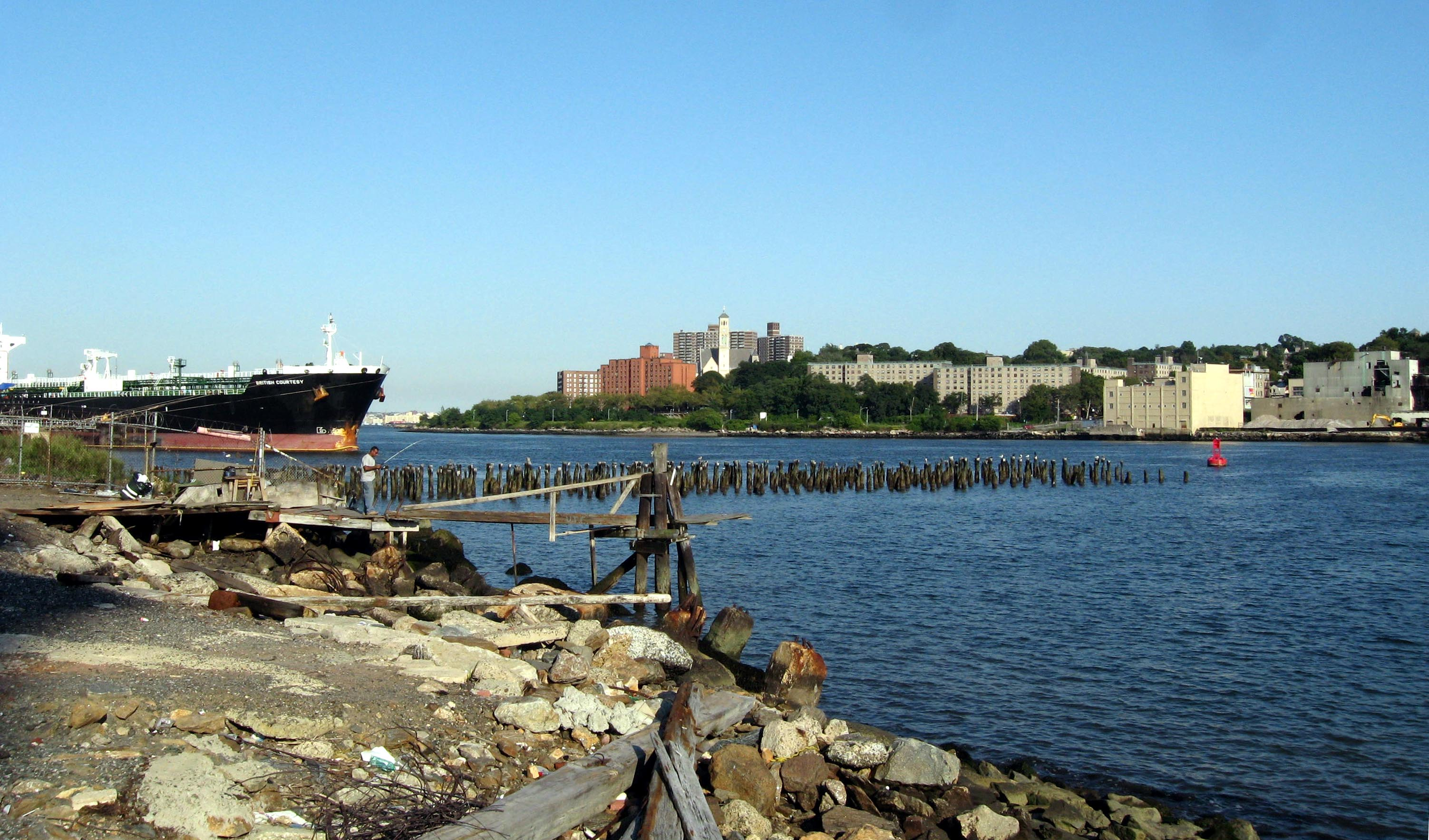
North Shore as seen from Bayonne, New Jersey

The term North Shore is frequently applied to a series of neighborhoods within the New York City borough of Staten Island.

== Boundaries ==
Generally, the North Shore is deemed to include the communities located within ZIP codes 10303, 10302 and 10310 in their entirety, along with all of the area covered by 10301 except Sunnyside, and those parts of 10304, 10305, 10314 that lie north of the Staten Island Expressway. This definition includes Mariners Harbor, Port Richmond, Westerleigh, Meiers Corners, Graniteville, Castleton Corners, West Brighton, New Brighton, St. George, Tompkinsville, Stapleton, Grymes Hill, Park Hill, Clifton, and Rosebank among the North Shore's neighborhoods. The Staten Island Expressway is considered by many to be a southern border.

== History ==
The North Shore is Staten Island's oldest and most densely populated area. Archaeological evidence suggests that the earliest Leni Lenape communities in the region date to as early as 2100 BC. The first contact with Staten Island by Europeans was recorded in 1524 by Giovanni da Verrazzano. In 1609, Henry Hudson established Dutch trade in the area and named the island Staaten Eylandt after the Staten-Generaal, the Dutch parliament.

== Points of interest ==
Important landmarks and points of interest located on the North Shore include the Staten Island Ferry, Staten Island Borough Hall, Alice Austen House, Fort Wadsworth, St. George Coast Guard Station, Sailors' Snug Harbor, The New York Chinese Scholar's Garden, Staten Island Yankees Stadium, Garibaldi Memorial, Staten Island Institute of Arts and Sciences, the Staten Island Zoo, St. George Theatre, Staten Island Children's Museum, Silver Lake Park, Clove Lakes Park and its public golf course.

Richmond Terrace, running from the Staten Island Ferry to the Goethals Bridge is the oldest established road in Staten Island. Originally an Indian footpath, it was later developed into a road by British soldiers during the Revolutionary War. Historic buildings such as the first YMCA c. 1869; Tompkins Department Store c. 1880; The DeGroot House c. 1810; the Captain Nevielle House c. 1750; and the Greek Revival buildings at Sailors' Snug Harbor still stand along the street today.

Many historic events took place along the waterfront. New York Governor Thomas Dongan established his manor house along Richmond Terrace in 1661 in the area now known as Castleton. Frederick Douglass spoke at the Fountain Hotel; Anna Leonowens of "The King and I" fame, owned a school at the corner of Richmond Terrace and Tompkins Court; Cornelius "Commodore" Vanderbilt, railway tycoon and patriarch of the Vanderbilt family, was born in the area in 1797. In 1836, former Vice President Aaron Burr died in Port Richmond at the St. James Hotel, a prominent hotel which once stood on Richmond Terrace until it was demolished.

Heading south past the ferry, the famed Alice Austen House and historic Fort Wadsworth still stand today.

The North Shore is the most economically and ethnically diverse section of Staten Island. It offers single family homes as well as multi-family dwellings and it is best served by public transportation in that the Staten Island Rapid Transit and all local buses culminate at the ferry terminal.

The North Shore is home to Staten Island Yankees Stadium as well as The New York Chinese Scholar's Garden.

== Demographics ==
According to the most current U.S. Census data estimates, the population in the neighborhoods typically lumped together as the North Shore is almost evenly split among Whites (mostly Irish, Italians, Albanians, and Russians), African-Americans and Hispanics/ Latinos, which each group comprising slightly more than 30 per cent of the total. They are joined by recent immigrants from such countries as Sri Lanka, Trinidad, Liberia and the Philippines. Since the 1990s, the North Shore has seen a large influx of Mexican immigration, many from Michoacán, and centered on Port Richmond and Tompkinsville.

== Transportation ==
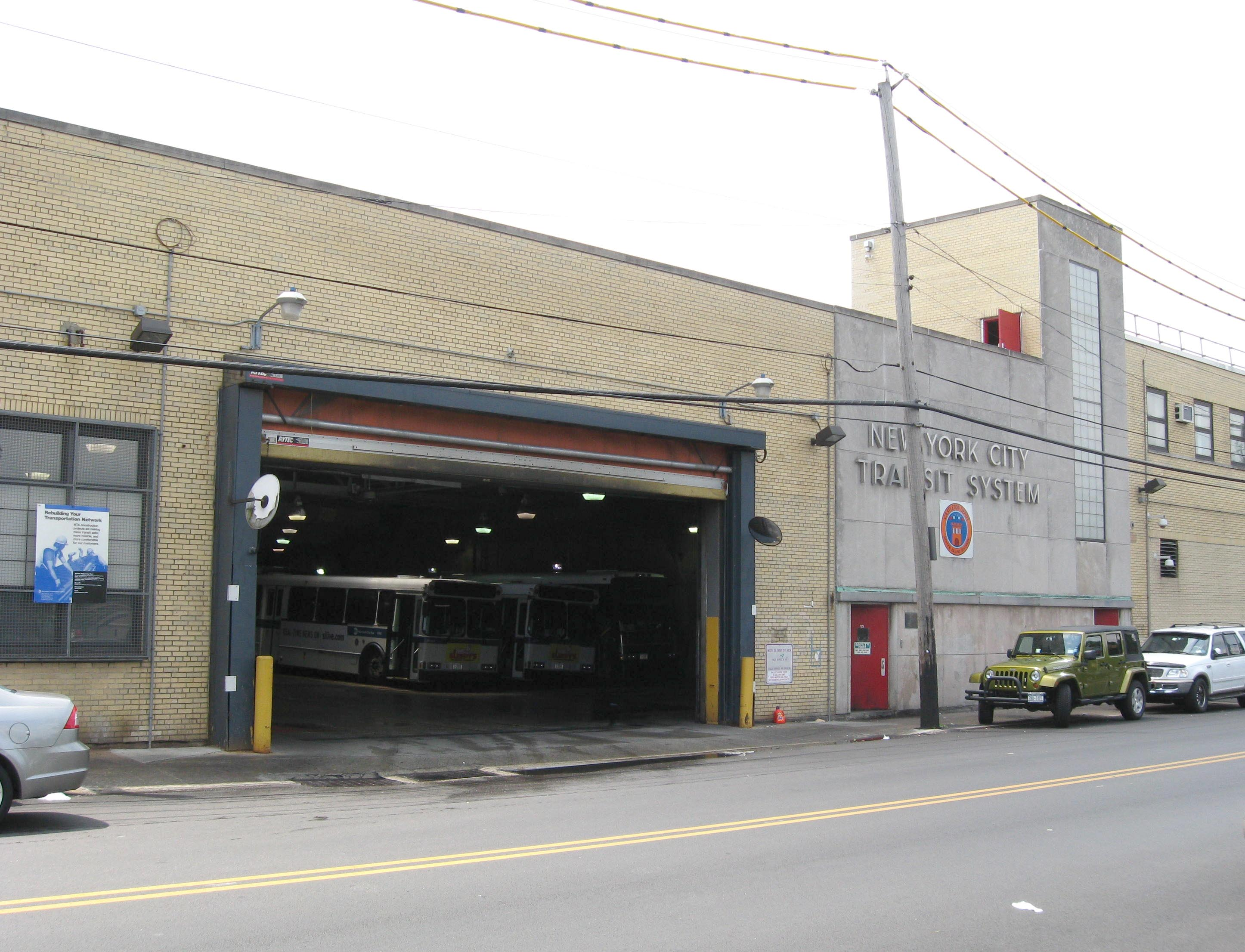
Castleton Bus Depot

The North Shore section of Staten Island is best served by public transportation. The Castleton Bus Depot at Castleton and Jewett Avenues is the main depot, and the Meredith Avenue Depot on the West Shore also holds buses for North Shore routes. The Staten Island Railway South Shore Branch has stops in Saint George, Tompkinsville, Stapleton, and Clifton. The North Shore was previously served by the North Shore Branch of the Staten Island Railway. The Staten Island Ferry serves the North Shore at St. George Terminal.

== Politics ==
Politically, the area is registered majority Democrat. It boasts the distinction of electing the first African American as its representative when it voted Debi Rose (D) into the New York City Council in November 2009. Other elected officials serving the area include District Attorney Michael McMahon (D) Borough President Vito Fossella (R) New York State Senator Jessica Scarcella-Spanton (D) New York State Assemblyman Charles Fall (D). The Island is represented in Congress by Nicole Malliotakis (R).

The North Shore is served by Staten Island Community Board 1. The New York City Police Department (NYPD) patrols the North Shore area in two separate precincts, the 120th Precinct in the eastern half and the 121st in the western half.

== Economy ==
The North Shore is New York City's busiest remaining working waterfront. Companies such as: Howland Hook Marine Terminal; Cadell Dry Dock; Atlantic Salt; Reynolds Launch; Flagg Container Terminal; Sandy Hook Pilots; Staten Island Ferry DOT Maintenance Facility; United States Coast Guard; Clean Harbors; May's shipyard; Moran', McAllister, Reinauer and K-Sea Towing serve the Kill Van Kull shoreline and the New York Harbor. The upland portion of the waterfront is dotted by quaint restaurants and local taverns that provide local entertainment. Gerardi's produce and the weekly Green Market provide local vendors the opportunity to sell their merchandise. Small businesses located within the Staten Island Ferry terminal provide low level employment opportunities.

In the early and middle 20th century the North Shore was an important manufacturing district.

Richmond University Medical Center and Staten Island University Hospital are Staten Island's largest employers - both of which service the North Shore.

The former HomePort site, which is being developed by Iron State, will be home to shops, restaurants and entertainment facilities, providing employment opportunities for local residents.

The St. George Theatre located at the top of Hyatt Street near Staten Island Borough Hall is the oldest theater on Staten Island. It has been recently restored and offers weekly live performances providing additional job opportunities for the area.

Old-fashioned shopping districts exist along Forest Avenue, Bay Street, Victory Boulevard and Port Richmond Avenue.

== Social issues ==
The district is also home to a disproportionate amount of the Island's medically uninsured, a number high enough to rank in the top third of New York City's 51 districts. However, compared to the rest of the city, the district is roughly average overall. The median household income for most of the zip codes is in the $50,000 - $60,000 range, compared to a citywide average of roughly $50,000, and the median per capital income is roughly $25,000, compared to a citywide average of roughly $30,000.
