= Casa Belvedere =

Historic house in Staten Island, New York

- Louis A. and Laura Stirn House
- U.S. National Register of Historic Places
- New York City Landmark
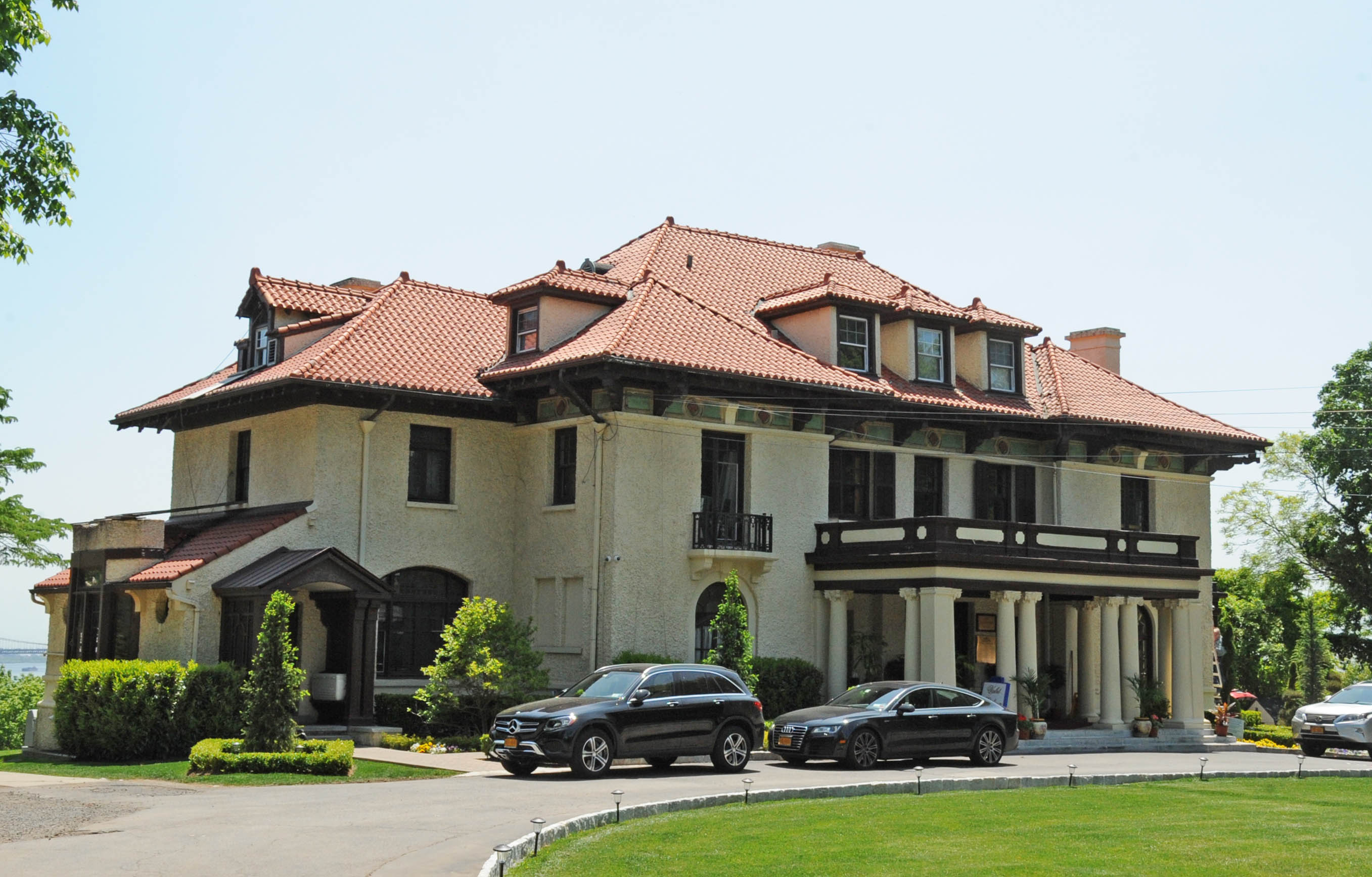

- Location within New York City Location within New York Location within the United States
- Location: 79 Howard Avenue, Grymes Hill, Staten Island, New York
- Coordinates: 40°37′42″N 74°05′18″W
- Area: 2.75 acres (1.11 ha)
- Built: 1908
- Architect: Kafka & Lindermeyr
- Architectural style: Italian Renaissance, Arts and Crafts
- NRHP reference No.: 10000899
- NYCL No.: 2069

Significant dates
- Added to NRHP: November 12, 2010
- Designated NYCL: January 30, 2001

Casa Belvedere is a cultural center devoted to Italian studies, located in the Louis A. and Laura Stirn House at 79 Howard Avenue in Grymes Hill, Staten Island, New York City. The mansion was constructed in 1908, and is an Italian Renaissance style building with Arts and Crafts detailing. It is a 2 1/2-story, stuccoed masonry structure with a 2 1/2-story service wing and attached conservatory. It features an overhanging clay tile hipped roof with bracketed eaves and a portico with Ionic order columns and Doric order corner piers. Also on the property is a contributing former garage.

Over the years it housed a number of different families, including for several years being the official residence of the President of Wagner College. It was declared a New York City Landmark in 2006 and listed on the National Register of Historic Places in 2010.

In 2008 it was purchased by Gina Biancardi and Luciano Rammairone. In 2010, the Biancardi-Rammairone family established Casa Belvedere in the Stirn House and donated it to the newly formed Italian Cultural Foundation. Over the next 15 years, it underwent a $5 million renovation with funds provided by private donors, the New York City Department of Cultural Affairs, and the Save America's Treasures program. The project included accessibility upgrades, structural reinforcement, and restoration of architectural details. During Hurricane Sandy, the building sustained structural damage.

== See also ==
- List of New York City Designated Landmarks in Staten Island
- National Register of Historic Places listings in Staten Island
