= Notre Dame Academy (Staten Island) =

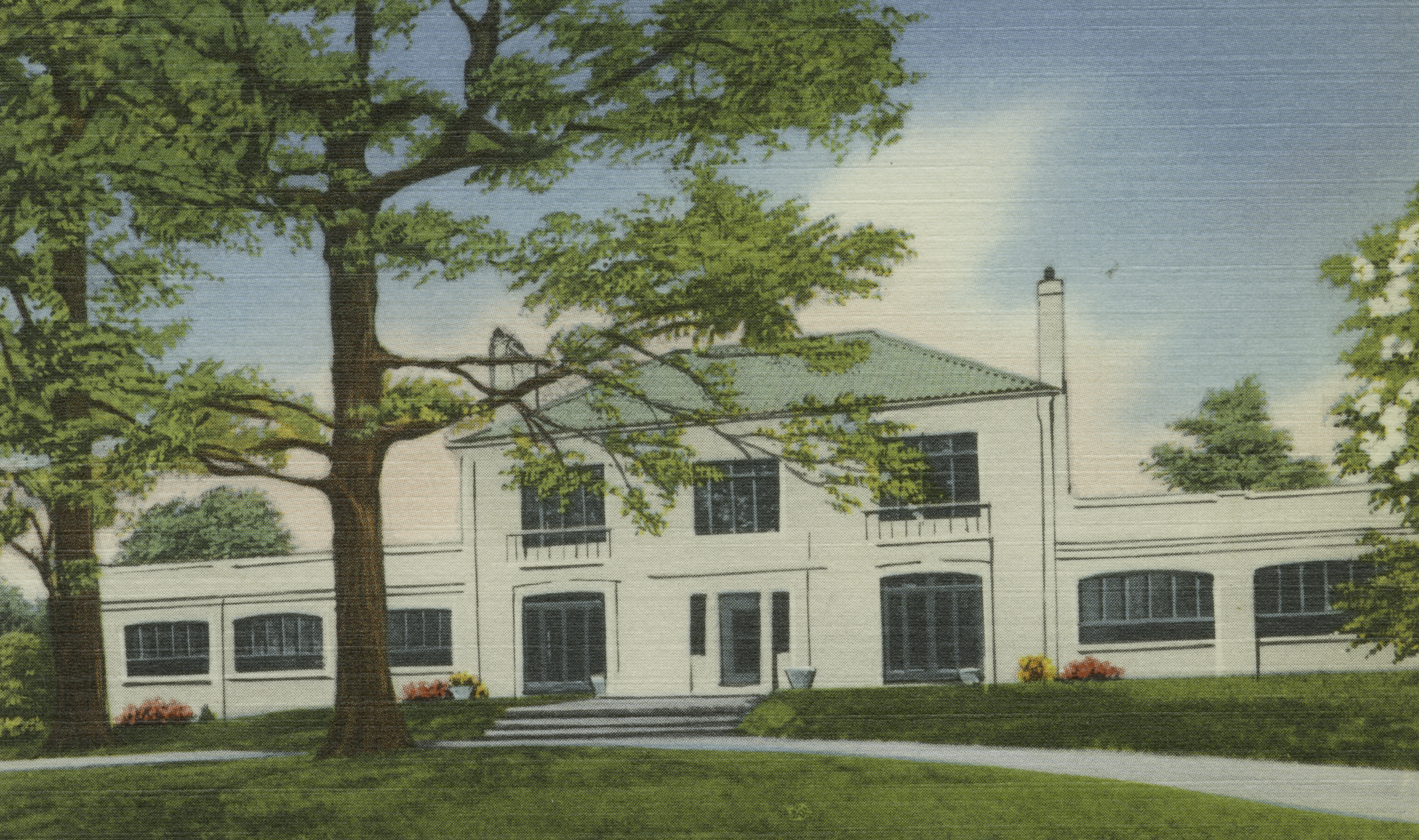
- Early 20th century

Location
- 74-134 Howard Avenue; Staten Island, New York 10301; United States; 40°37′43.5″N 74°5′21.5″W

Information
- Former name: Academy of Our Lady of the Blessed Sacrament (until after circa 1949)
- Type: Private, girls
- Motto: Renovemur in Christo (Let us be renewed in Christ)
- Religious affiliation: Roman Catholic
- Established: 1903 (123 years ago)
- President: Kathryn Jaenicke
- High School Principal: Meaghan O’Brien
- Elementary School Principal: Kerri Paone
- Grades: PK3 – 12
- Campus size: 13 acres (5.3 ha)
- Campus type: Suburban
- Colors: Green and white
- Team name: Gators
- Accreditation: Middle States Association of Colleges and Schools
- Newspaper: Notre Data
- Yearbook: Nostra
- Affiliation: Congregation of Notre Dame of Montreal
- Website: www.notredameacademy.org

Notre Dame Academy is an American private Catholic girls' school in Staten Island, New York.

It is located within the Roman Catholic Archdiocese of New York. As a private school, Notre Dame is not owned by the archdiocese, although it does maintain a close affiliation with the archdiocese.

The school is located on a 13-acre (5.3 ha) campus on Grymes Hill in Staten Island, New York.

Consisting of an elementary school (PK3 – 8) and high school (9–12), the school serves approximately 700 students.

While providing an education in the Catholic tradition, the school is open to girls of all faiths.

== History ==
The school was founded in 1903 after William Miller-Jones traveled to Montreal to ask the sisters of the Congregation of Notre Dame of Montreal to come and start a school on Staten Island. After his appeal, the sisters were granted permission by John Murphy Farley, then-Archbishop of New York, to come and teach in his diocese.

Miller-Jones then began looking for a location, which he secured on Howard Avenue. The school opened in September 1903 and was called the Academy of Our Lady of the Blessed Sacrament.

The school began taking its first boarding students in 1908, which was a tradition that continued until 1959.

After moving further up Howard Avenue, which allowed for expansion, the school applied for and was granted approval by the New York State Board of Regents for the elementary school in 1914 and a charter for the high school in 1917.

Eventually as the population of Staten Island increased, so too did the demand for an education, and the sisters met this pressing need by purchasing and renovating two more estates thereby expanding to the 13 acres (5.3 ha)

After receiving accreditation from the Middle States Association of Colleges and Schools in 1949, the school ushered in several changes, including the school seal and the official name change to Notre Dame Academy of Staten Island.

In the 1950s and 1960s, the school underwent further expansion, including a separate building to house the elementary school which contained a new cafeteria and gymnasium.

The campus remained largely the same until the beginning of the 21st century.

The new century saw another wave of expansion and renovation, including an Early Childhood Center with classrooms for students in the Pre-K3 to Grade 2 classrooms, and an Arts and Humanities Building, housing a new chapel, a dining hall, an art studio, a computer lab, and several new classrooms. In addition, the classrooms in other buildings have all been renovated to meet the growing technological demands with computers and SmartBoards, while many of the major textbooks are now available as part of a digital library.

== Academics ==
The high school offers a college preparatory liberal arts and STEM curriculum that exceeds the requirements established by the New York State Board of Regents. In addition to fulfilling the requirements for a Regents diploma with Advanced Designation, students also have the opportunity to take a selection of Advanced Placement courses including:

- biology
- calculus
- computer science
- English language and composition
- English literature and composition
- physics
- studio art
- U.S. government and politics
- U.S. history
- world history

Students also have the opportunity to earn college credits through the school's affiliation with St. John's University (New York City).

Students are offered an array of electives, including anatomy and physiology, campus ministry, digital, creative writing, environmental science, photography, psychology, sociology, songwriting, and women and the media.

The curriculum in the elementary school aims to assure that the students will achieve high scores on state standardized tests, Archdiocesan exams, and two State Regents exams. They are awarded more than $100,000 in scholarships to the high schools of their choice.

== Activities ==
Notre Dame offers a number of activities and athletic teams.

== Notable alumni ==
- Dawn Aponte, American football executive
- Ceil Chapman (1912–1979), fashion designer
- Madeline Gravante, professional soccer player
- Patricia Neway, operatic soprano; Broadway theatre actress
