= Todt Hill =

Neighborhood in New York City

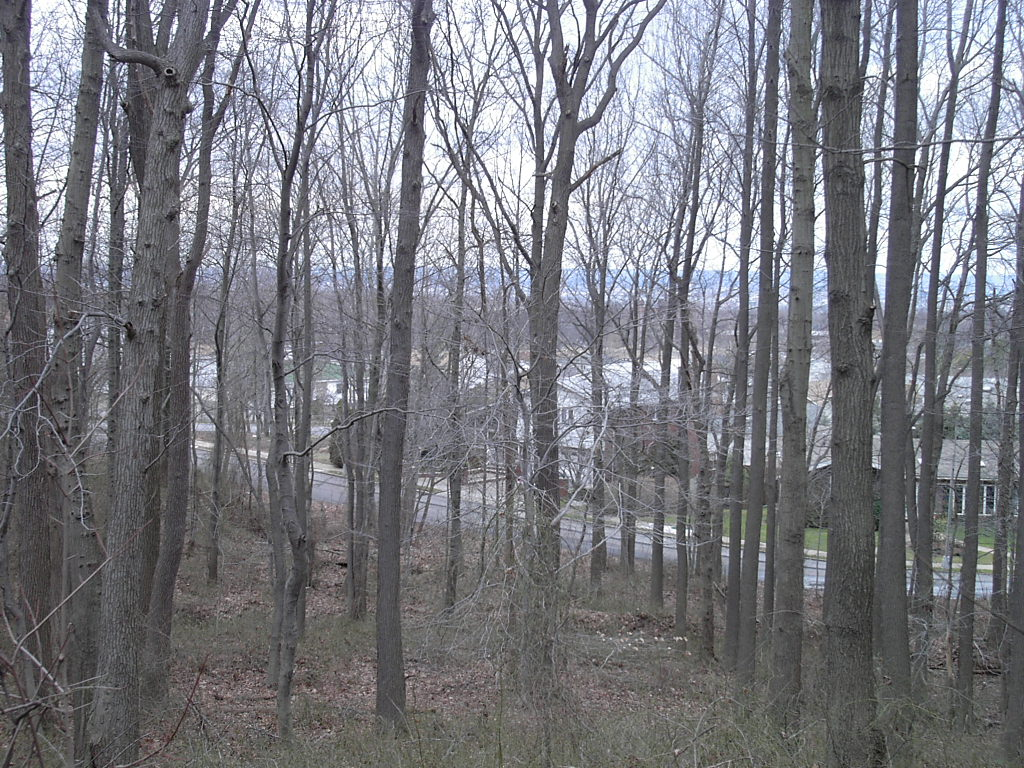
- Todt Hill view

Highest point
- Coordinates: 40.60033°N 74.11478°W

Geography
- Location within New York City Location within New York

Todt Hill (/ˈtoʊt/ TOHT) is a 401-foot-tall (122 m) hill formed of serpentine rock on Staten Island, New York. It is the highest natural point in the five boroughs of New York City and the highest elevation on the entire Atlantic coastal plain from Florida to Cape Cod. The summit of the ridge is largely covered in woodlands as part of the Staten Island Greenbelt, although much of the surrounding area is developed and residential. It is considered one of the most exclusive and most expensive areas of Staten Island.

== History ==
The name Todt comes from the German word "Tod" for "death" and may refer to the cemetery (the present Moravian Cemetery, opened in 1740 and now the island's largest cemetery) on the southwestern foot of the ridge near the town of New Dorp that has been in use since colonial days. An alternate explanation is that the name was given by early Dutch settlers because of treeless rocky exposures on the hilltop, caused by the soil of the Staten Island Serpentinite locality.

At the beginning of the 20th century, many houses designed by the architect Ernest Flagg were built in the area. A significant part of Todt Hill is now included in the Staten Island Greenbelt.

== Geography ==
The term Todt Hill is now often used to include the upscale developments in the hills along the eastern side of the ridge, which most island geographers classify as part of the neighborhood of Dongan Hills.

Two small, natural ponds are found on Todt Hill, and a Roman Catholic priory is located near the summit. Staten Island Academy, a private school, moved its campus to Todt Hill in the 1960s. There is a golf course adjoining the Moravian Cemetery, each of which has a man-made pond. Otherwise the hill is either parkland or private homes. There is no public transit available on Todt Hill, and most of the streets, including Todt Hill Road, the neighborhood's main thoroughfare, lack sidewalks.

The point of highest elevation is near the intersection of Todt Hill Road and Merrick Avenue.

== Demographics ==
For census purposes, the New York City Department of City Planning classifies Todt Hill as part of a larger Neighborhood Tabulation Area called Todt Hill-Emerson Hill-Lighthouse Hill-Manor Heights SI0203. This designated neighborhood had 32,822 inhabitants based on data from the 2020 United States Census. This was an increase of 1,971 persons (6.4%) from the 30,851 counted in 2010. The neighborhood had a population density of 7.8 inhabitants per acre (14,500/sq mi; 5,600/km^{2}).

The racial makeup of the neighborhood was 62.8% (20,597) White (Non-Hispanic), 4.1% (1,348) Black (Non-Hispanic), 19.8% (6,486) Asian, and 3% (971) from two or more races. Hispanic or Latino of any race were 10.4% (3,420) of the population.

According to the 2020 United States Census, this area has many cultural communities of over 1,000 inhabitants. This include residents who identify as Puerto Rican, German, Irish, Italian, Indian, and Chinese.

The largest age group was people 55-74 years old, which made up 24.9% of the residents. 75.1% of the households had at least one family present. Out of the 10,623 households, 57.1% had a married couple (22.4% with a child under 18), 3.1% had a cohabiting couple (1.2% with a child under 18), 14.3% had a single male (1.6% with a child under 18), and 25.4% had a single female (3.9% with a child under 18). 32.7% of households had children under 18. In this neighborhood, 30.3% of non-vacant housing units are renter-occupied.

== Notable residents ==
- The Gambino crime family boss Paul Castellano lived there, in a house noted for its intended resemblance to the White House. His family continued to live on Todt Hill after his 1985 death, but moved in 2000.
- Mob Wives reality television star Drita D’Avanzo grew up in the Todt Hill Houses.
- Former New York Mets relief pitcher John Franco currently lives on the hill.
- The Corleone family compound from The Godfather was filmed on Todt Hill.
- Frank Matthews, a notorious drug kingpin in the 1970s, lived on Todt Hill.
- Frank Cali, acting boss of the Gambino crime family, was killed outside his home in Todt Hill on March 13, 2019.

== Transportation ==
Todt Hill is served by multiple bus routes on Richmond Road, including the S74, S76, S84 and S86 local buses, and the SIM15 express bus.
