= Silver Lake, Staten Island =

Neighborhood in New York City

Silver Lake
- Neighborhood of Staten Island
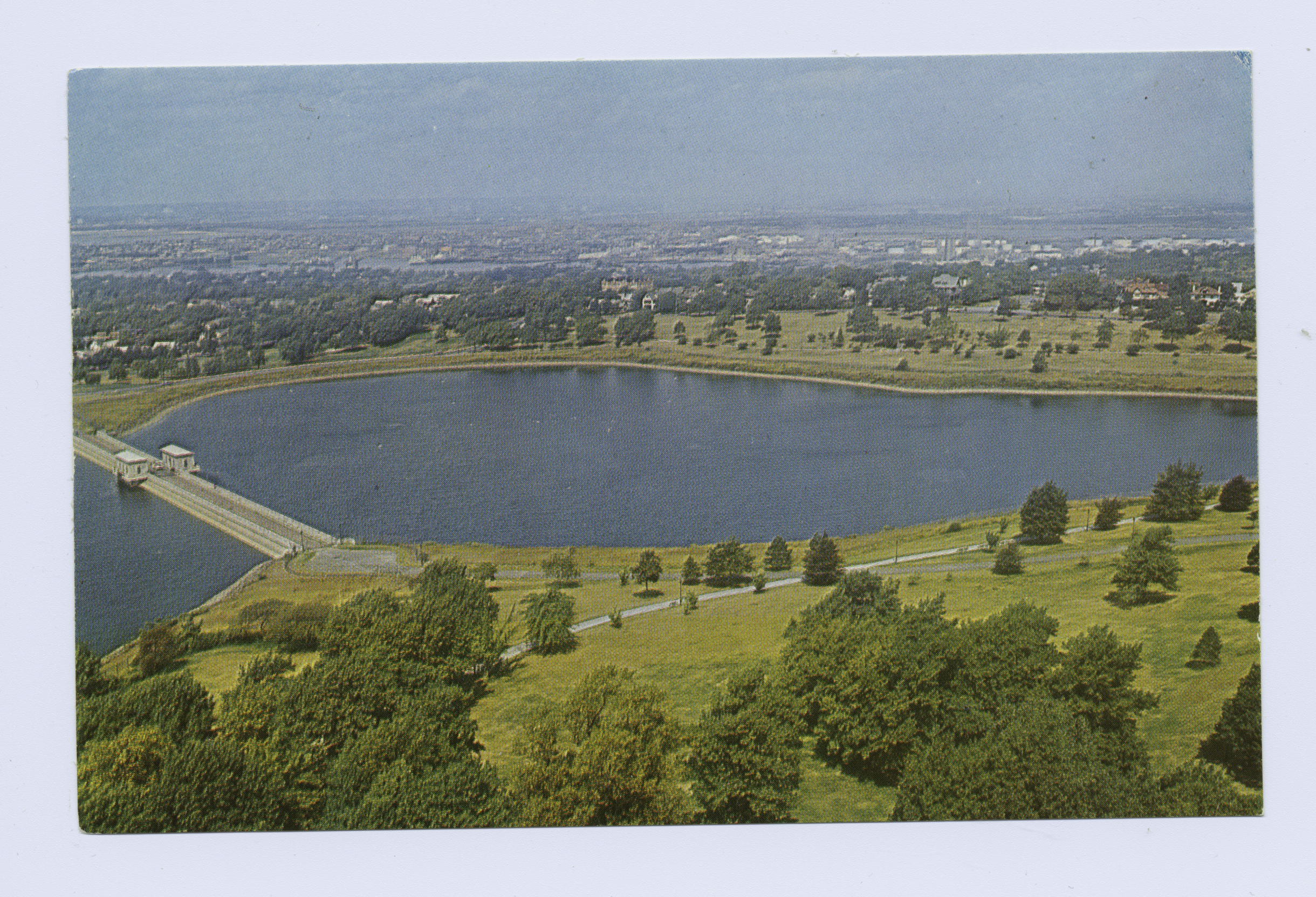
- A postcard showing the northern half of Silver Lake
- Location within New York City
- Coordinates: 40°37′31″N 74°05′45″W
- Country: United States
- State: New York
- City: New York City
- County/Borough: Staten Island
- ZIP code: 10301
- Area codes: 718, 347, 929, and 917

Silver Lake is a reservoir and adjacent neighborhood in the New York City borough of Staten Island.

== History ==
Silver Lake Park, located on Staten Island's north shore, is bounded by Forest Avenue, Victory Boulevard and Clove Road. The original Silver Lake was a spring-fed body of water formed at the end of the ice age, and now makes up the south basin of the reservoir at this site. Silver Lake was once known as Fresh Pond, but maps show that by the middle of the nineteenth century, the name Silver Lake had come into use and the two were used interchangeably until about 1860. Silver Lake was named after Mark Silver, who founded the philanthropic organization today known as the Hebrew Free Burial Association. He had earlier Americanized his name from Marks Silva. The Association purchased land that became the Silver Lake Cemetery, and it was used for charitable burials. Many of the victims of the 1911 Triangle Shirtwaist Factory fire are buried there.

Silver Lake has a long history of both recreational and commercial uses. During the 19th century, a casino and saloon existed on the lakeshore and several companies harvested its ice. Staten Islanders used the lake for boating and ice skating in that era, and in February 1897, Silver Lake hosted the National Skating Amateur Championship races.

By the end of the 19th century, the population of Staten Island was growing rapidly and residents were calling for land to be set aside for parks. Noting that it was prohibitively expensive and time-consuming for families to visit Manhattan's Central Park or Brooklyn's Prospect Park, prominent Staten Island writer and resident John De Morgan appealed in February 1900 to the State Assembly Committee on Cities to appropriate funds to establish Silver Lake Park. “The people of the community have a right to recreation and pleasure grounds,” he addressed Assembly members in Albany, “Where . . . their children [can be] kept from the contaminating influence of the saloon.”

De Morgan's plea to the State Assembly worked; the Silver Lake Park Commission was created and in their 1900 session legislators appropriated a modest amount for acquiring the land around the lake. The original parcels for Silver Lake Park around the perimeter of the lake were condemned and purchased in 1901, 1902, and 1904, at which point Staten Island parks officials began to convert the area to its current state.

As modern refrigeration replaced ice harvesting, in 1913 the lake was drained and converted to a working reservoir by the Board of Water Supply. The Board was created by the state legislature in 1905 to build the Catskill water supply system. Silver Lake Reservoir in its current form was created in 1917 when water was piped in to fill it from the Ashokan Reservoir in Ulster County, New York, 119 miles (192 km) away. The water started arriving on October 25, and the reservoir would become the largest body of fresh water on Staten Island. The park's underbrush began to be removed in 1921 and the natural oaks (Quercus), tulip trees (Liriodendron tulipifera) and sassafras (Sassafras albidum) were supplemented with shrubs, spruce (Picea) and pine (Pinus) trees, and flowerbeds. A January 1921 letter to the editor in the Staten Island Advance lamented the loss: “Nature [should be] encouraged rather than operated on [by Staten Island parks officials] who are so anxious to improve upon nature.”

Although the park's scenery is dominated by the reservoir, other parts of the park are notable. Land from Marine Cemetery, a nineteenth-century burial site for the Marine Hospital Quarantine in Tompkinsville, was added to the park in 1924. In 1928 the land was converted to a golf course, and in 1994 researchers discovered documentation linking the site to its past use as a cemetery. Today it is thought that perhaps several thousand immigrants, including many Irish escaping the Great Famine of Ireland, who died from contagious diseases after landing in the United States are buried under the 18th fairway of the golf course. The golf course itself was completed in 1929 and tennis, biking, softball, and playground facilities were added as Silver Lake Park became a recreational hub for the developing borough. “You can visit Silver Lake Park in your Sunday suit and come away untarnished,” a 1954 Staten Island Advance piece on the borough's parks claimed. The reservoir was used for potable water until 1971 when an underground storage tank system was completed, the largest of its kind in the world. The underground tanks were constructed in conjunction with the Richmond Tunnel, a water supply tunnel that runs from Brooklyn to Staten Island. Today the reservoir is used as part of the drainage system for the tanks.

In 1988, Staten Island Borough President Ralph J. Lamberti provided $1.4 million for a new administration building and children's play area. Again in 1997, Borough President Molinari allocated $700,000 to repave walkways and to add new plants, benches, fences, guiderails, play equipment, handball courts.

In 2026, $2 million was allocated for a renovation of Silver Lake Park.

== Features ==
Silver Lake Park has many attractions, such as tennis courts, an 18-hole public golf course, a baseball field, play area, and dog run.

The neighborhood to the east and south features several large privately owned apartment buildings and three cemeteries along Victory Boulevard. Also included in the neighborhood, on the other side of the adjacent Silver Lake golf course, is a series of mostly dead-end streets located above Forest Avenue and Hart Boulevard. The dead end streets are Lakewood Road, Park Court, Edstone Drive, Rose Court and Silver Court. They comprise approximately eighty-eight homes and are part of the Silver Lake Park Association. At the very top of Hart Boulevard are the Silver Lake Tennis Courts. Adjacent to the tennis courts is a baseball field. To the west of this neighborhood are Grymes Hill, Wagner College and Sunnyside, where the Mid-Island region is said to begin (the Silver Lake section being reckoned as part of the North Shore).

== Demographics ==
For census purposes, the New York City Department of City Planning classifies Silver Lake as part of a larger Neighborhood Tabulation Area called West New Brighton-Silver Lake-Grymes Hill SI0104]. This designated neighborhood had 37,010 inhabitants based on data from the 2020 United States Census. This was an increase of 1,526 persons (4.3%) from the 35,484 counted in 2010. The neighborhood had a population density of 18.6 inhabitants per acre (14,500/sq mi; 5,600/km^{2}).

The racial makeup of the neighborhood was 45.0% (16,673) White (Non-Hispanic), 16.5% (6,116) Black (Non-Hispanic), 8.0% (2,975) Asian, and 4% (1,475) from two or more races. Hispanic or Latino of any race were 26.4% (9,771) of the population.

According to the 2020 United States Census, this area has many cultural communities of over 1,000 inhabitants. This include residents who identify as Mexican, Puerto Rican, English, German, Irish, Italian, Polish, African-American, and Chinese.

The largest age group was people 10-34 years old, which made up 33.8% of the residents. 66.5% of the households had at least one family present. Out of the 13,141 households, 41.9% had a married couple (18.1% with a child under 18), 5.7% had a cohabiting couple (2.1% with a child under 18), 19.6% had a single male (1.7% with a child under 18), and 32.8% had a single female (2.0% with a child under 18). 32.9% of households had children under 18. In this neighborhood, 47.4% of non-vacant housing units are renter-occupied.

== Transportation ==
Silver Lake is served by the S48, S61, S62, S66, S91, S92 and S98 local/limited buses and the SIM30 express bus.
