= Timeline of Staten Island =

Coordinates: 40.576281°N 74.144839°W

This is a timeline of Staten Island.

== 17th century ==
- 1609 – Henry Hudson names island "Staaten Eylandt."
- 1630 – Island granted by the Dutch West India Company to Michael Pauw.
- 1636 – Part of the island granted by the Dutch West India Company to David Pietersz. de Vries.
- 1640
  - Remaining part of the island granted by the Dutch West India Company to Cornelis Melyn.
  - Willem Kieft establishes the first distillery in North America.
- 1641 – Settlement established by David Pietersz. de Vries at Oude Dorp, New Netherland.
- 1655–60 – Lenape attack and burn the last Cornelius Melyn/David de Vries attempt at settlement, capturing or killing the Dutch settlers.
- 1657 – Natives sign a deed to Lubbertus van Dincklage for the purchase of Staten Island. This was annulled months later when the Dutch didn't deliver the promised goods.
- 1663 – Another blockhouse built at Fort Wadsworth.
- 1664 – Island transferred from Dutch to British.
- 1668 – Island becomes part of British Province of New York.
- 1670 – Island's first church, for the Waldensian Evangelical Church, was established in Stony Brook (now New Dorp).
- 1680 – First Dutch Reformed Church formed in Port Richmond.
- 1683 – Richmond County designated.
- 1696 – Voorlezer's House completed, the oldest known schoolhouse in America.
- 1698 – Island population reaches 727; slaves constitute 10%.

== 18th century ==
- 1713 – St. Andrew's Church built.
- 1727 – Richmond village becomes seat of Richmond County, New York.
- 1740 – Moravian Cemetery established.
- 1749 – Population: 2,154
- 1763 – Moravian Church built.
- 1774 – Staten Island elects not to send a representative to the First Continental Congress, the only county in New York State to decline.
- 1776
  - July 3: British military occupation begins.
  - September 11: Staten Island Peace Conference held.
- 1777 – August 22: Battle of Staten Island occurs.
- 1783
  - November 25: British military occupation ends.
  - December: British evacuation complete.
- 1786 – Population: 3,152
- 1787 – First Woodrow Methodist congregation established and church built, called "Mother Church of Staten Island".
- 1788 – Towns of Castleton, Northfield, Southfield, and Westfield established.
- 1792 – Reformed Dutch Church incorporated.
- 1794 – Cornelius Vanderbilt is born.
- 1799 – Quarantine established (NY Marine Hospital) over fierce opposition; ultimately burned in 1858.

== 19th century ==
=== 1800s–1840s ===
- 1802 – Episcopal Church (Northfield) built.
- 1808 - Staten Island "became the borough of Richmond in Greater New York".
- 1812 - War of 1812.
- 1817 – Richmond Turnpike Company ferry begins operating to New York City.
- 1823 – Population: 6,135.
- c.1825 – Old Staten Island Dyeing Establishment incorporated.
- 1826 – Agricultural Society organized.
- 1828 – Fort Tompkins Light commissioned.
- 1833 – Sailors' Snug Harbor opens for retired merchant seamen.
- 1836 – Aaron Burr dies in a boardinghouse in Port Richmond.
- 1837
  - Courthouse and jail built.
  - Pavilion Hotel in business.
- 1839 – St. Peter's Church established, first Roman Catholic parish on the Island.
- 1840 – Bethel United Methodist Church (Tottenville) built.
- 1842 – Current Woodrow Methodist Church built after fire.
- 1844 – Current Dutch Reformed Church on Staten Island built.
- 1845 – Moravian Church built.
- 1847 – Richmond County Law Library and Marine's Family Asylum founded.
- 1848 – St. Peter's Cemetery established.

=== 1850s–1890s ===
- 1855 – St. Joseph's Church established.
- 1856
  - Staten Island Historical Society founded.
  - New Dorp Light commissioned.
- 1858 – Quarantine War
- 1860
  - Staten Island Rapid Transit Railway begins operating.
  - Town of Middletown formed from parts of Castleton and Southfield.
  - Fort Tompkins built.
- 1861 – Battery Weed fortification built.
- 1865
  - Church of the Holy Comforter built.
  - Mexican General Lopez de Santa Anna begins a decade-long exile.
- 1866
  - Brighton Heights Reformed Church and St. Paul's Memorial Church (Staten Island, New York) built.
  - Staten Island Leader newspaper begins publication.
  - Villages of Edgewater and Port Richmond incorporated.
- 1869 – Tottenville and S.R. Smith Infirmary incorporated.
- 1870
  - Population: 33,029.
  - Atlantic Brewery established by Joseph Rubsam and August Horrmann in Stapleton.
- 1871
  - July 30: Westfield ferry disaster.
  - New Brighton Village Hall built.
  - Antonio Meucci files a patent with the United States Patent and Trademark Office for one of the earliest versions of the telephone.
- 1874 – Tennis introduced to North America for the first time on the island.
- 1875 – Frederick Walton sets up the first North American linoleum factory in Travis.
- 1877 – Cornelius Vanderbilt dies and is buried in Moravian Cemetery.
- 1878 – St. Philip's Baptist Church, the first Black church on Staten Island, opens.
- 1880 – Staten Island Water Supply Company established.
- 1881
  - Natural Science Association founded.
  - Staten Island Museum opens.
- 1882 - Father Drumgoole acquires the land which will become the Mount Loretto orphanages.
- 1883
  - November: Richmond County bicentennial.
  - Wagner College founded in Rochester. It does not move to Staten Island until 1918.
- 1884 – St. George Terminal and Staten Island Academy open.
- 1886
  - Richmond County Advance newspaper begins publication.
  - Richmond County Savings Bank and St. John's Guild Children's Hospital (New Dorp) established.
- 1888 – Richmond County Country Club opens.
- 1890 – Population: 51,693.
- 1893 – Emily Post, 20th Century arbiter of American etiquette, moves to Staten Island.
- 1894 – Calvary Presbyterian Church built.
- 1898
  - January 1: Island becomes Borough of Richmond of New York City.
  - George Cromwell becomes Richmond's first Borough President.

== 20th century ==
=== 1900s–1940s ===
- 1900
  - Tottenville Copper Company (later Nassau Smelting) founded by Benjamin Lowenstein.
  - Population: 67,021.
- 1901 – June 14: Northfield ferry accident.
- 1903 – Fort Wadsworth Light commissioned. Notre Dame Academy (Grymes Hill) established.
- 1904 – Christ Church New Brighton (Episcopal) built. Tottenville Library the oldest branch of the New York Public Library on Staten Island opens. Curtis High School is established.
- 1905
  - The Wittemann brothers operate America's first airplane manufacturing plant.
  - Population: 72,845.
- 1906 – Staten Island Borough Hall built in Saint George. Happyland Amusement Park opens in South Beach.
- 1907 – Public Museum of the Staten Island Institute of Arts and Sciences established.
  - Temple Emanu-El built.
  - Procter & Gamble factory (Milliken) opens.
- 1910 – Population: 85,969.
- 1915 – Staten Island Stapletons football team founded; later plays in the National Football League from 1929 to 1932.
- 1918 – Wagner College moves from Rochester to Staten Island.
- 1919
  - Richmond County Courthouse opens in Saint George.
  - St. Joseph Hill Academy founded.
- 1923 – Staten Island Tunnel construction begins; cancelled in 1925.
- 1924
  - May: Huguenot-Walloon-New Netherland 300th Anniversary of Religious Freedom in 1924 celebrated in Huguenot with 2,000 spectators attending dedication of a church as a National Memorial to the Huguenots.
  - Ritz Theater (Port Richmond) built.
- 1926
  - Staten Island Armory built.
  - Conference House Park established.
  - Fire destroys St. George ferry terminal, killing three and causing $22 million in damage.
- 1927 – Port Richmond High School established.
- 1928 – Outerbridge Crossing (bridge) opens to Perth Amboy, New Jersey. Goethals Bridge opens to Elizabeth, New Jersey.
- 1929
  - St. George Theatre built.
  - Staten Island Stapletons play their first games as a National Football League franchise.
- 1930 – Holy Trinity Greek Orthodox Church opens.
- 1931 – Bayonne Bridge opens to Bayonne, New Jersey.
- 1933 – Notre Dame College (Staten Island) opens.
- 1935 – South Beach-Franklin Delano Roosevelt Boardwalk constructed.
- 1936 – Staten Island Zoo opens. Robin Road Trestle (bridge) built. Foreign trade zone established on Staten Island.
- 1937
  - Our Lady of Mount Carmel Grotto construction begins.
  - Tenement collapse in New Brighton kills 19.
- 1938 – Lane Theater opens in New Dorp.
- 1941 – Beachland Amusements opens.
- 1942 – January 1: Staten Island jails transferred from the County Sheriff's Department to the NYC Department of Corrections
- 1947 – Fresh Kills Landfill, Willowbrook State School, and Jacques Marchais Museum of Tibetan Art established.
- 1949
  - Great Kills Park opens.
  - The Greater New York Councils of the Boy Scouts of America make their first purchase of land from the estate of Ernest Flagg to establish the William H. Pouch Scout Camp in Sea View.

=== 1950s–1990s ===
- 1950 – Population: 191,555.
- 1953 – March 31: Passenger service discontinued on the North Shore Branch and the South Beach Branch train lines.
- 1956 – Staten Island Community College (later College of Staten Island) founded.
- 1957 – Queen Elizabeth visits the Island by train en route from Washington DC to Manhattan, the first Royal to visit since William IV during the American Revolution.
- 1958 – Historic Richmond Town (museum) established.
- 1959 – Arthur Kill Vertical Lift Bridge opens to Elizabethport, New Jersey.
- 1960 – December 16: One of the two planes in the 1960 New York mid-air collision crashes into Staten Island.
- 1961 – Monsignor Farrell High School opens.
- 1962 – Archaeology Society of Staten Island founded.
- 1963
  - The revised (1963) New York City Charter creates community boards within each borough.
  - April 20: Rossville Fire.
  - Ferry from Tottenville to Perth Amboy discontinued.
  - Piels Beer brewery closes.
- 1964
  - Verrazzano–Narrows Bridge opens to Brooklyn.
  - Staten Island Expressway opens.
  - Staten Island wins the Little League World Series, defeating the team from Monterrey, Mexico.
- 1965 – Willowbrook Parkway opens.
- 1966 – Staten Island Register newspaper begins publication. Robert T. Connor becomes Borough President. Hylan Plaza shopping centre in business.
- 1970 – Population: 295,443.
- 1971
  - July 1: SIRT turned over by B&O Railroad to a division of the MTA.
  - St. John's University Staten Island campus opens.
- 1972
  - Tottenville High School relocates to a new building in Huguenot.
  - Geraldo Rivera reveals abuses at Willowbrook State School, resulting in its subsequent closure.
- 1973
  - 1973 Staten Island gas explosion kills 40 people.
  - Staten Island Mall in business.
  - Fire destroys Mount Loretto Children's Home.
- 1975 – "Borough of Richmond" becomes "Borough of Staten Island."
- 1976 – Arthur Kill Correctional Facility and College of Staten Island established. Staten Island Children's Museum opens.
- 1977 – Preservation League of Staten Island and Newhouse Center for Contemporary Art founded. Anthony Gaeta becomes Borough President.
- 1978 – Northfield Community Local Development Corp. founded.
- 1979 – Fort Wadsworth transferred to US Navy from US Army.
- 1980 – Population: 352,029.
- 1981
  - WSIA radio begins broadcasting.
  - Congressman Murphy convicted in Abscam bribery.
- 1982 – New Dorp High School relocates to new building south of Hylan Boulevard near Miller Field.
- 1984
  - Ralph J. Lamberti becomes Borough President.
  - Staten Island Greenbelt created.
- 1988 – Staten Island AIDS Task Force founded.
- 1989 – The remaining unfinished portion of the Richmond Parkway proposed by Robert Moses and defeated by public outcries, is officially demapped, solidifying the establishment of Staten Island Greenbelt. US Supreme Court abolishes NYC Board of Estimate, propelling Staten Island secession movement.
- 1990
  - Naval homeport opens.
  - Guy Molinari becomes Borough President.
- 1992 – RZA, GZA, and Ol' Dirty Bastard form the Wu-Tang Clan out of the Clifton and Stapleton sections of the Island. Along with Inspectah Deck, Raekwon the Chef, U-God, Ghostface Killah, Method Man, and Masta Killa.
- 1993 – November 2: Voters approve secession of Staten Island from New York City in a non-binding referendum.
- 1994 – Staten Island Conservatory of Music founded. Naval Homeport is closed due to BRAC.
- 1997 – Staten Island Ferry becomes free.
- 1999 – The New York Chinese Scholar's Garden and College of Staten Island Baseball Complex open. Staten Island Yankees baseball team established.

== 21st century ==
- 2001
  - Richmond County Bank Ballpark opens. Fresh Kills Landfill closes but receives remains and debris from the collapse of the Twin Towers from the September 11 attacks.
  - Beatle George Harrison receives radiation treatment at Staten Island University Hospital.
- 2002 – James Molinaro becomes Borough President.
- 2003 – Andrew Barberi ferry crash kills 11 and injures 70.
- 2004 – Eltingville Transit Center built.
- 2005 – Great Kills Park closed due to excessive gamma radiation.
- 2007 – Richmond University Medical Center established.
- 2008 – Staten Island LGBT Community Center opens.
- 2010 – Population: 468,730.
- 2011 – Mosque (Dongan Hills) opens. Arthur Kill Correctional Facility closes.
- 2012 – October: Hurricane Sandy.
- 2014
  - Killing of Eric Garner
  - In September Pete Davidson joins Colin Jost and the cast of Saturday Night Live, the first time two Islanders were represented on the show.
- 2020 – July: Buddy, a German Shepherd and the first dog diagnosed with COVID-19, dies. By year-end, the virus kills approximately 1,300 Island residents.
- 2022 - January 1: Vito Fossella became the sixteenth Staten Island Borough President.

== See also ==
- History of Staten Island
- National Register of Historic Places listings in Richmond County, New York
- List of Staten Island neighborhoods
- List of Richmond/Staten Island Borough Presidents
- List of high schools in New York City – Staten Island
