= St. Mary's Church (Staten Island) =

Church in New York City, United States

Coordinates: 40°36′58.28″N 74°4′1.79″W

The Church of St. Mary
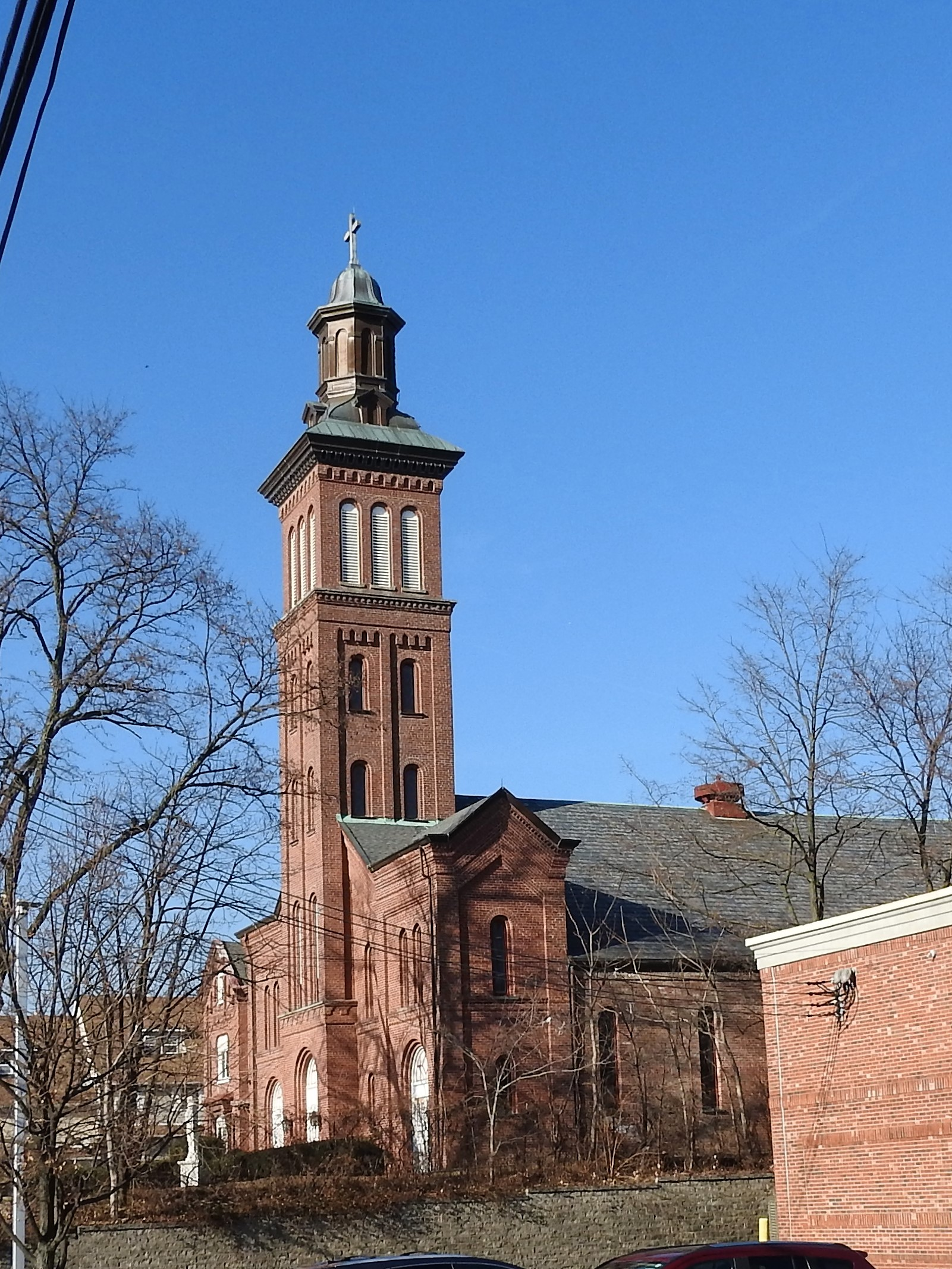
- St. Mary's R. C. Church Rosebank, Staten Island, N.Y

General information
- Location: Rosebank, Staten Island, New York City, United States of America
- Client: Roman Catholic Archdiocese of New York

The Church of St. Mary is a Roman Catholic parish church in the Roman Catholic Archdiocese of New York, located at 1101 Bay Street, Staten Island, New York City. St. Mary's is the second oldest of the 36 Roman Catholic parishes on Staten Island, having been established in 1852, after St. Peter's (1839), and before St. Joseph's in Rossville (1855).

In 2015, the parishes of St. Mary's, St. Joseph in Rosebank, and Immaculate Conception in Stapleton were merged to form the Parish of St. Joseph and St. Mary Immaculate, thus closing the church, with masses remaining at St. Joseph's, and Immaculate Conception.

In October 2025, the building was sold to Lera Holdings, LLC for more than $2.8 million, according to online documents from the Richmond County Clerk. On November 16, 2026, the bell tower was demolished as part of the overall demolition project of the site.

== Parish history ==
The parish was established in 1852 by Father John Lewis, who was born in France and arrived in the United States in 1851. At first, Father Lewis celebrated Mass in a private house before land was donated and in 1857 a church was built. The rectory was constructed in 1858.

In 1862 Father Lewis purchased seven acres of land from the Parkinson estate in Southfield for a cemetery. Besides the school, in 1864, Lewis built a convent, a parish orphan asylum, and a residence for the male teachers. Writing in 1877, one commentator stated, "Father Lewis is entitled to commendation for his zeal and fidelity in his efforts to promote the spiritual and temporal interests of his parishioners."

In 1878 Fr. Lewis added St. Mary's Hall for lectures, concerts, dramatic performances and other meetings. Later, before St. Adalbert's Church was completed, Rev. Michael Slupek would celebrate Mass for Staten Island's Polish Catholics at St. Mary's Hall.

In 1883 the Young Men's Literary Union Hall was constructed. In 1882 he built at his own expense, a chapel of ease at Stapleton for the convenience of the aged and infirm of the parish. It was called the "Chapel of Ease of the Clifton Parish".

In 2015, the parish of St Mary's merged with the parishes of St. Joseph's Church and Immaculate Conception, and has remained closed since.

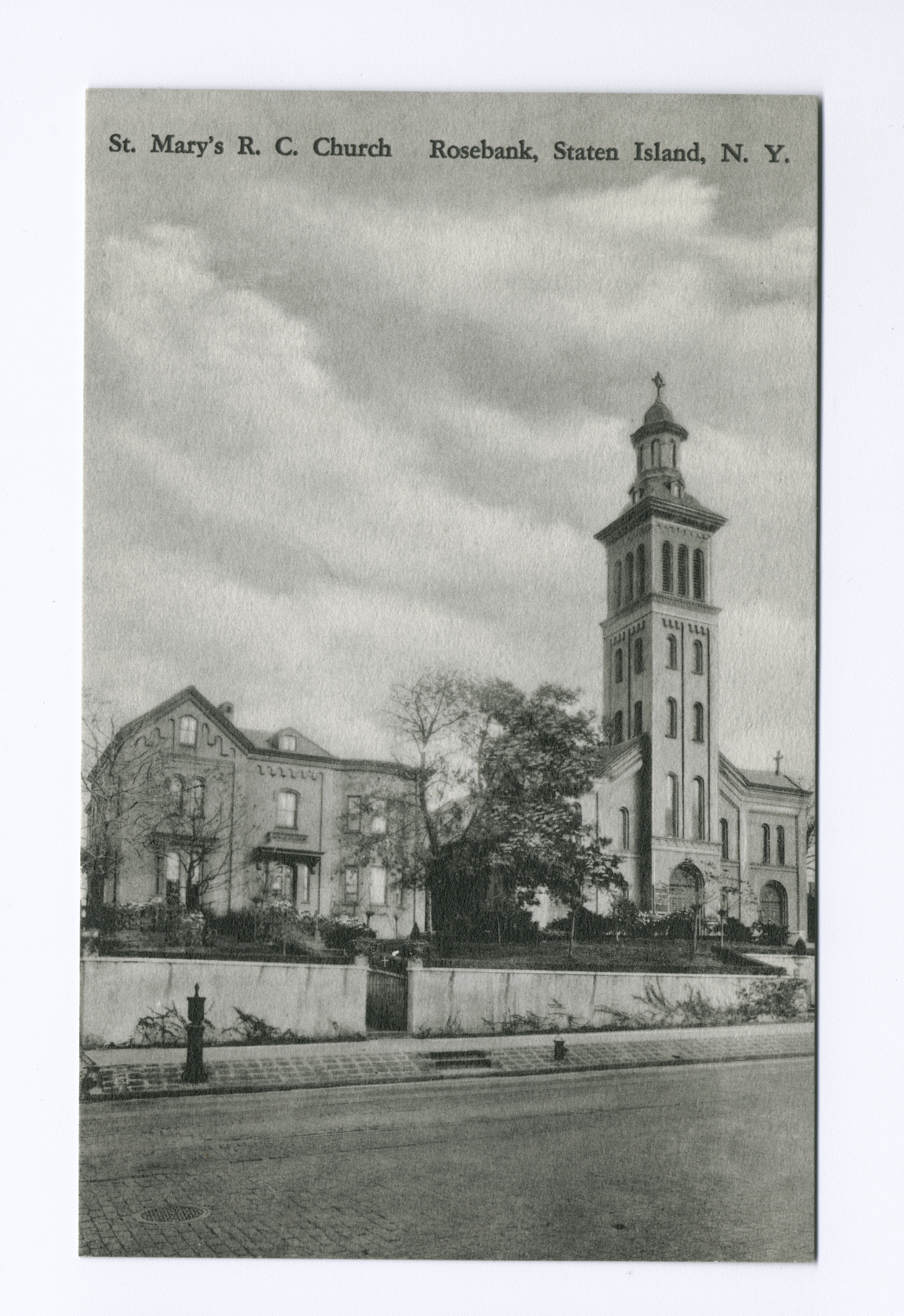
Early 20th century

After its closure, It was de-sanctified in 2020, and sold to a private holding company for redevelopment as of October 2025.

== Architecture ==
St. Mary's Church and rectory were constructed in 1857. Both were built of red brick, the church in North Italian Romanesque style with a central tower.

== Pastors ==
- Rev. John Lewis (1852-1887)
- Rev. Corkery (1887-1890)
- Rev. James F. Mee (1891-1909)
- Rev. Michael A. Cunniff (1909-1909 when he died)
- Msgr Daniel J. McMackin, D.D. (1909-?), assisted in 1914 by Rev. Cornelius J. Cronan
- Rev. Victor J. Buebendorf (1991-2015)
- Rev. Fredy Patiño (2016-2021)
- Rev. Carlos Limongi (2021–2025)
- Rev. Wesbee Victor. (2025-Present

== St. Mary's Parish School ==
The parochial school was established by the founding pastor, the Rev. Lewis, and conducted by 5 Sisters of Charity of Mount St. Vincent-on-the-Hudson (who also conducted an academy) and 3 lay teachers. The school had, in 1914, 182 boys and 188 girls.

The school was among 27 closed by the Archdiocese of New York effective June 2011.

In 2023 it was announced the City of New York planned to build an early childhood learning center at the school grounds, and in 2024 the school building was demolished.
