= Castleton, New York =

Castleton is the name of two places in the U.S. state of New York:

- Castleton, Staten Island, a former town in the U.S. state of New York
- Castleton-on-Hudson, New York (locally referred to as Castleton)
