= List of former municipalities in New York City =

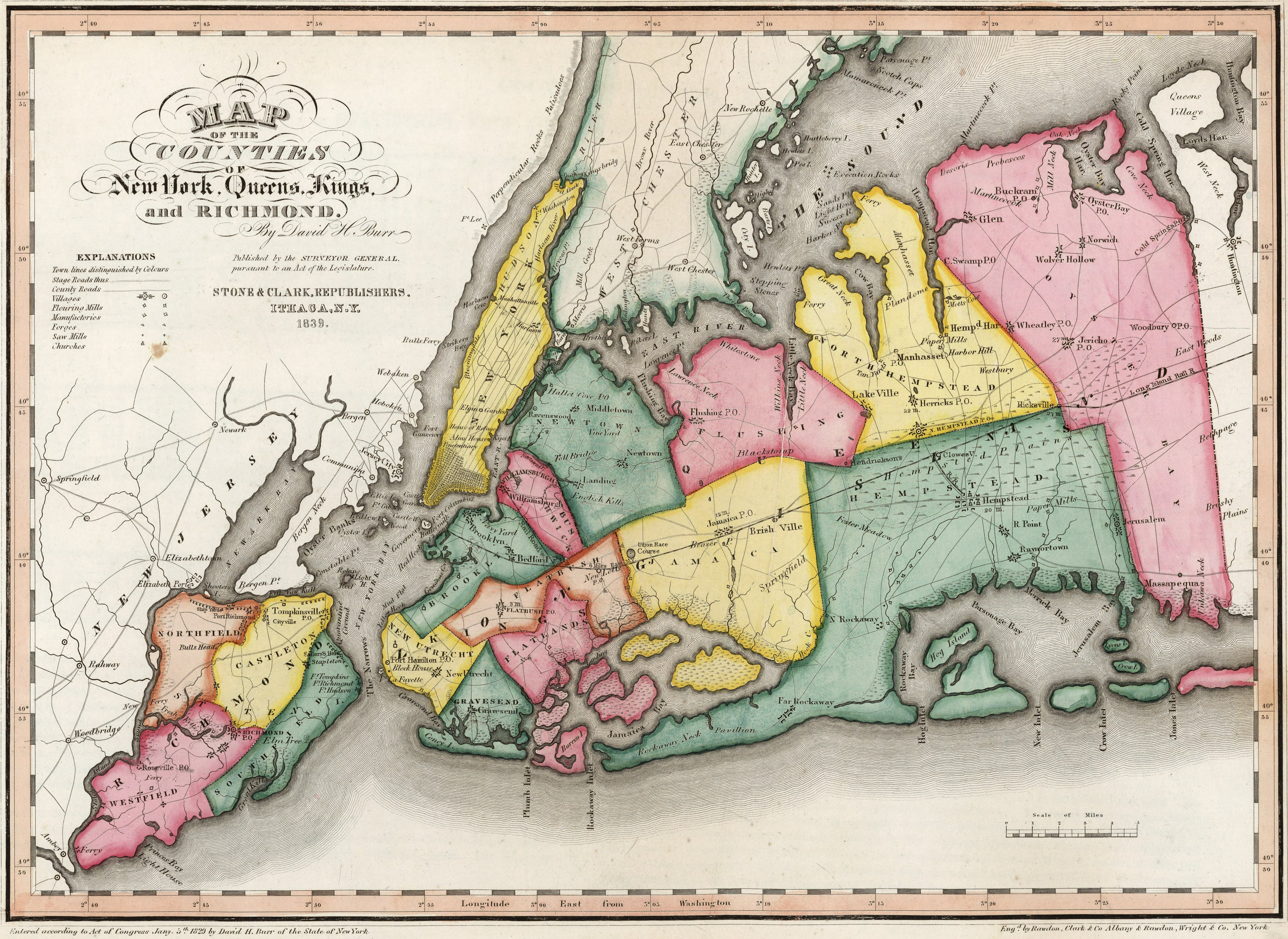
1839 map of the vicinity of today's New York City. Most of the three easternmost towns depicted would become Nassau County instead. Towns in what is now the Bronx are not depicted in this map.

The City of Greater New York was formed in 1898 through the consolidation of a number of municipalities, some of which were themselves previously consolidated from smaller municipalities. This article lists the villages, towns and cities that formerly existed within the current boundaries of New York City, from the time the British assumed control of New Amsterdam in 1664 until the 1898 consolidation. The term "town" as used in the state of New York refers to county divisions often known as townships in other states.

== New York County ==
New York County is coextensive with Manhattan.

- City of New York
- Town of New Harlem (Nieuw Haarlem) - chartered 1658, annexed to New York in 1666

== Bronx County ==
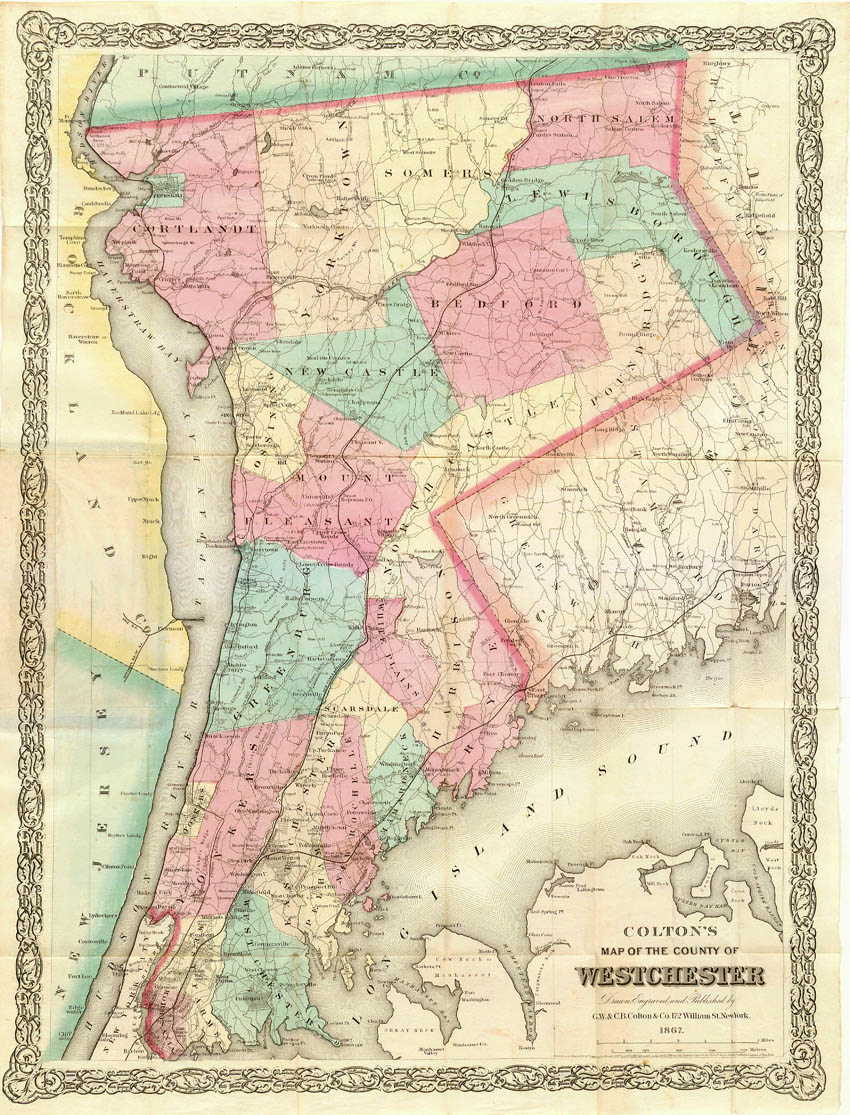
Map of Westchester County, including the portion that would later become The Bronx, in 1867

The Bronx was annexed from Westchester County by New York County (and New York City) in 1874 (west of Bronx River) and 1895 (east of it). Those two parts were established as a separate borough upon the consolidation of Greater New York in 1898, but was not legally established as a separate county, Bronx County, until 1914.

West Bronx - annexed to New York City in 1874.

- Town of Yonkers (part) - the part that would later be incorporated into the Bronx separated as Kingsbridge in 1873
  - Town of Kingsbridge - separated from Yonkers in 1873; annexed to New York in 1874
- Town of Morrisania - separated from West Farms in 1855; annexed to New York in 1874
  - Village of Morrisania - incorporated within the Town of Morrisania in 1864
- Town of West Farms - separated from Westchester Town in 1846; annexed to New York in 1874

East Bronx - annexed to New York City in 1895.

- Town of Eastchester (part) - annexed to New York in 1895
  - Village of Wakefield - incorporated within the Town of Eastchester in 1889
- Town of Pelham (part) - annexed to New York in 1895
- Town of Westchester - annexed to New York in 1895
  - Village of Williamsbridge - incorporated within the Town of Westchester in 1888

== Kings County ==
An 1859 map of Kings and Queens Counties. At this point, the City of Brooklyn had already annexed Williamsburg and Bushwick, and Long Island City had not yet been formed.

When it was created in 1688 Kings County contained six towns. The City of Brooklyn eventually annexed the other towns and cities in Kings County between 1854 and 1896, before itself becoming part of New York City in 1898.

- Town of Brooklyn, founded as "Breuckelen" in 1646, Brooklyn was one of the "Six Towns" of Kings County; incorporated as a city in 1834
- Village of Brooklyn, incorporated within the town in 1816 (its boundaries roughly match those of present-day neighborhood of Brooklyn Heights), became part of the city of Brooklyn in 1834
- City of Brooklyn, the entire town of Brooklyn became a city in 1834.
- Town of Bushwick - founded as "Boswijck" in 1661, annexed to Brooklyn in 1854
- Town of Flatbush - founded as "Midwout" in 1652; was county seat of Kings County; annexed to Brooklyn in 1894
- Town of Flatlands - founded as "Nieuw Amersfoort" in 1647; annexed to Brooklyn in 1896
- Town of Gravesend - founded in 1645; annexed to Brooklyn in 1894
- Town of New Lots - separated from Flatbush in 1852; annexed to Brooklyn in 1886
- Town of New Utrecht - founded in 1657 as Nieuw Utrecht; annexed to Brooklyn in 1894
- Town (later a city) of Williamsburgh - separated from Town of Bushwick in 1840; became a city in 1851, annexed to Brooklyn in 1854

== Queens County ==
All of Flushing, Jamaica, Long Island City, and Newtown, as well as the Rockaway Peninsula portion of Hempstead, consolidated into Greater New York in 1898. The rest of Hempstead and the Towns of North Hempstead and Oyster Bay split from Queens County to form Nassau County in 1899. Prior to consolidation, Lloyd Neck, which was then part of the Town of Oyster Bay and had earlier been known as Queens Village, seceded from Queens County and became part of the Town of Huntington in Suffolk County in 1885.

- Town of Flushing, chartered 1645 as Vlissingen
  - Village of College Point, incorporated within Flushing in 1880
  - Village of Flushing, incorporated within the Town of Flushing in 1837
  - Village of Whitestone, incorporated within Flushing in 1868
- Town of Hempstead (part)
  - Village of Far Rockaway, incorporated within the Rockaway Peninsula portion of Hempstead in 1888
  - Village of Rockaway Beach, incorporated within the Rockaway Peninsula portion of Hempstead in 1897
- Town of Jamaica
  - Village of Jamaica, incorporated within the Town of Jamaica in 1814
  - Village of Richmond Hill, incorporated within the Town of Jamaica in 1894
- City of Long Island City (separated from Newtown in 1870)
- Town of Newtown, chartered as Middelburgh in 1652, renamed Hastings in 1663 and then New Towne in 1665.

== Richmond County ==
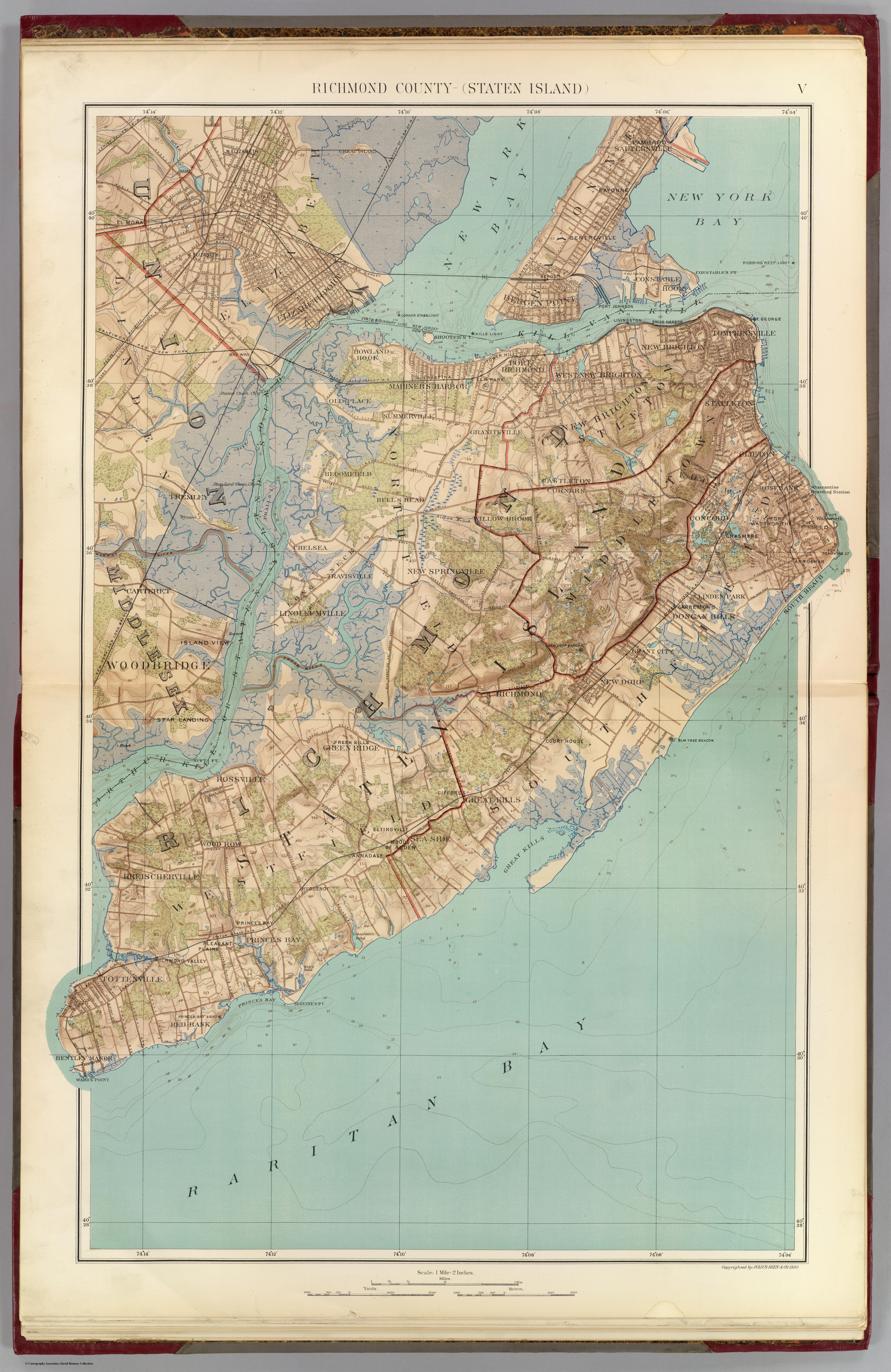
Staten Island in 1891

All of Staten Island consolidated into Greater New York in 1898.

- Town of Castleton
  - Village of New Brighton - incorporated within the Town of Castleton on April 26, 1866
- Town of Northfield
  - Village of Port Richmond - incorporated within Northfield on April 24, 1866
- Town of Middletown - formed in 1860 from parts of Castleton and Southfield
  - Village of Edgewater - incorporated within the Town of Middletown in 1866
- Town of Southfield
  - Village of Richmond - incorporated within the Town of Southfield in 1823
- Town of Westfield
  - Village of Tottenville - incorporated within the Town of Westfield under special conditions on April 28, 1869 & reincorporated under standard village conditions in 1894
