= Middletown, Staten Island =

Coordinates: 40.6115°N 74.1101°W

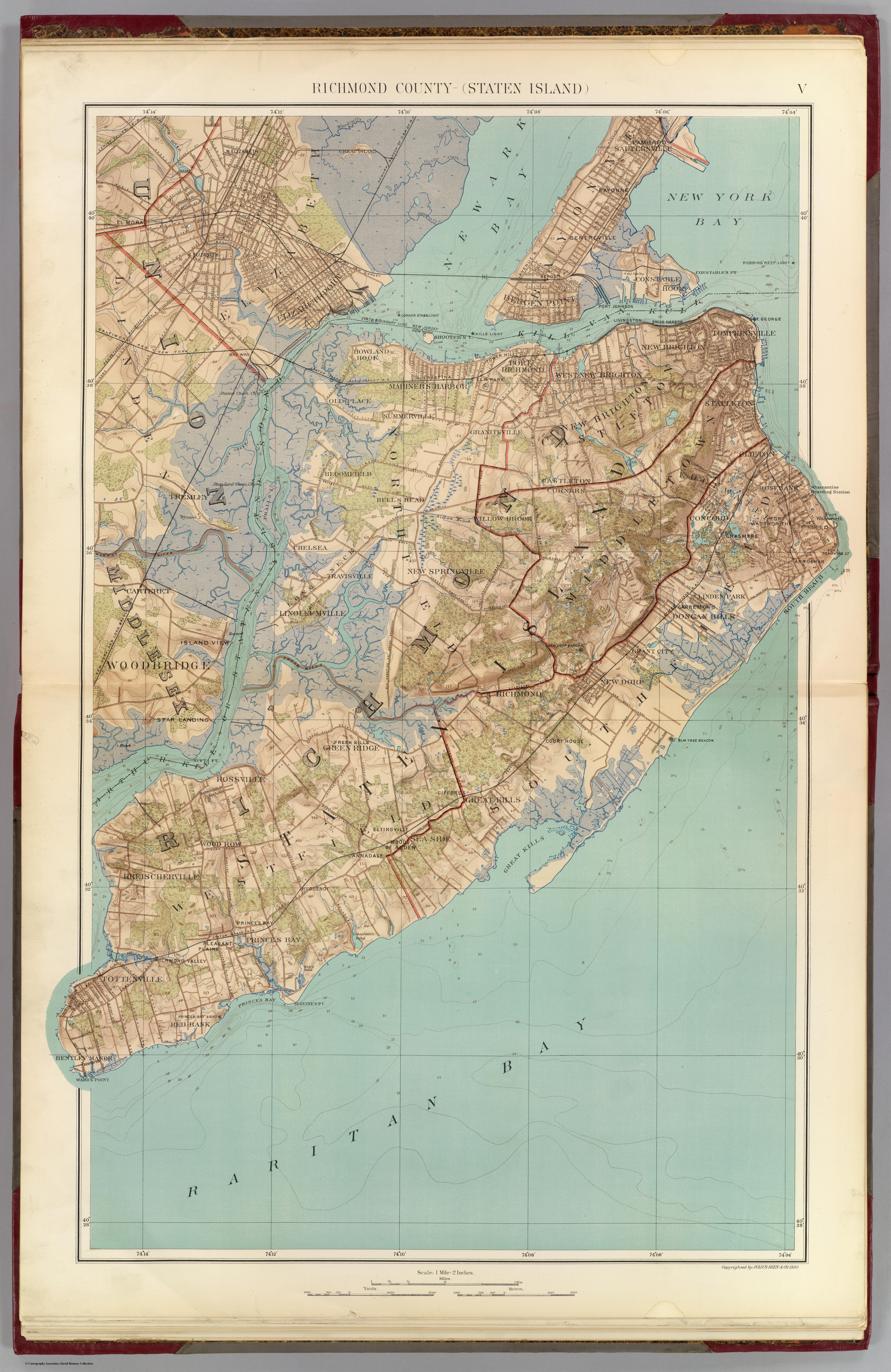
1891 map showing Middletown in the northeastern portion of Richmond County

Middletown was a town in Richmond County, New York. It was incorporated in 1860 from parts of Southfield (north of Vanderbilt Avenue) and Castleton (south of Richmond Turnpike). Prior to its incorporation, the two towns were bordered by Richmond Road (now Van Duzer Street) and William Street. At the time, it included the most populous part of the village of Edgewater and the hilly ridges of the interior, Grymes Hill and Todt Hill among others.

It was dissolved in 1898 upon consolidation into the City of New York.

== See also ==
- List of Staten Island neighborhoods
- List of former municipalities in New York City
