= City of Greater New York =

Consolidation of New York City in 1898

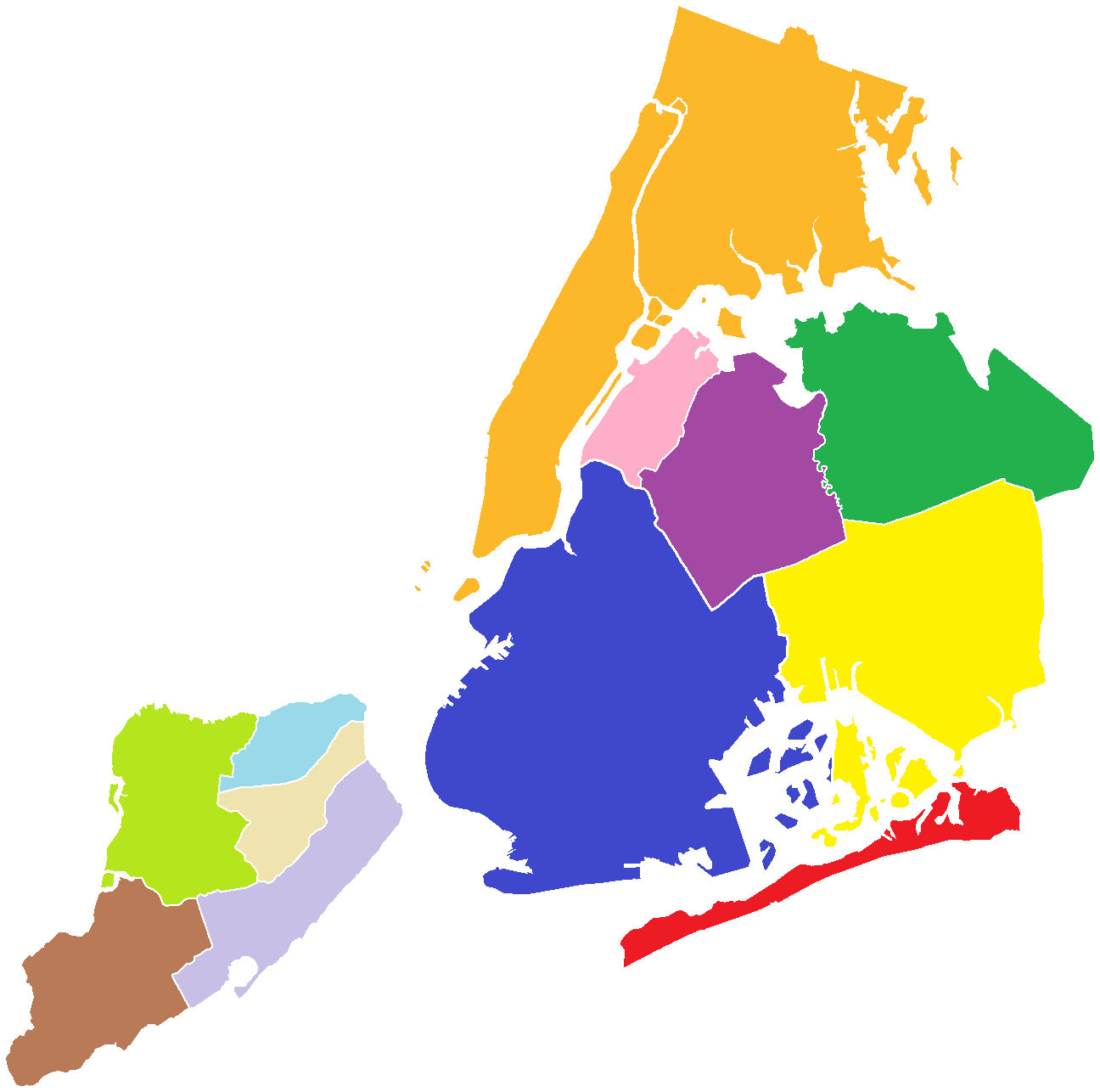
The municipalities of modern-day New York City in 1897, just before consolidation, excluding villages. New York County and Bronx County: City of New York Kings County: City of Brooklyn Queens County: Long Island City Town of Elmhurst Town of Flushing Town of Jamaica Town of Hempstead (part) Richmond County: Town of Castleton Town of Middletown Town of Southfield Town of Westfield Town of Northfield

The City of Greater New York was a ceremonial name used during the consolidation of the City of New York with Brooklyn, western Queens County, and Staten Island, which took effect on January 1, 1898. New York had already annexed the Bronx (west of the Bronx River in 1874, east of the Bronx River in 1895), so the consolidated city sprawled across five counties of New York State, which became the five Boroughs of modern New York. Eastern Queens County was excluded and later became Nassau County.

== Background ==
New York City had been founded in the 1620s by the Dutch as New Amsterdam at the southern tip of the island of Manhattan. The English conquered the territory and established the original twelve counties of the province of New York in 1683; one of these was the City and County of New York. A 1691 law defined New York City to be the entirety of Manhattan, while Manning's Island (now Roosevelt Island), the Barn Islands (now Randalls and Wards Islands), and the Oyster Islands (now Liberty Island, Ellis Island and Black Tom) were New York County. Towns had been established in the rest of the province by 1691, and were reincorporated after the American Revolution in 1788.

Brooklyn had been chartered by the Dutch in 1646; the Town of Brooklyn was one of the towns incorporated by 1691 and reestablished in 1788. It was located within Kings County, another county established by the English in 1683. It was incorporated as a village in 1814 and as a city in 1834. Originally comprising what is now Downtown Brooklyn, it annexed its surroundings through the 19th century and grew to encompass all of Kings County in 1895. By the 1890 United States census Brooklyn had become the fourth-largest city in the United States.

Since the late 1820s, there had been some discussion of a unified city. In 1857, the New York State Legislature resolved that the region surrounding New York City should become one body, to improve harbor facilities and link the systems of trade. They attempted to do so by government vote, but distrust of large projects killed the plans.

== Consolidation ==
The consolidation movement was the work of local, city, and state politicians, most prominently Andrew Haswell Green, the president of the "Greater New-York Commission" and "The Father of Greater New York". Green was a member of the Board of Commissioners of Central Park, which provided him a platform to push his views.

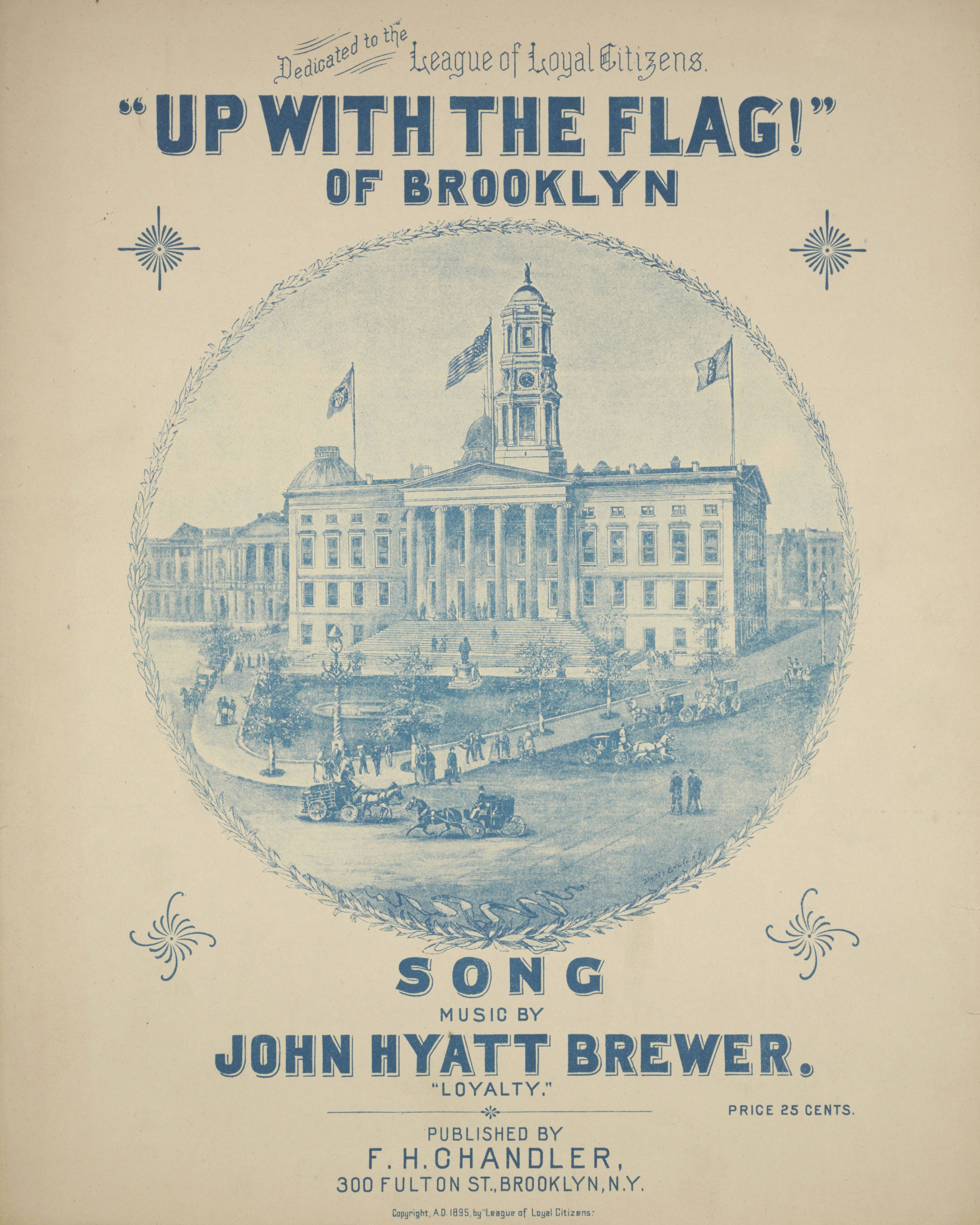
"Up With the Flag! (of Brooklyn)", an 1895 anti-consolidation song

The next challenge to the independence of the boroughs was a self-promoted and government-appointed commission. The commission led the "Vote for Greater New York" movement. Some opponents derided the effort as "Andy Green's hobby", but eventually they were proven wrong. The center of the plan was the consolidation of the twin cities of New York and Brooklyn, whose fire departments had been merged into a Metropolitan Fire District in 1865. The addition of Long Island City and various rural areas anticipated future development of those areas. With Republicans historically more powerful in Brooklyn and Democrats elsewhere, partisan politics played a role: each major political party hoped to dominate the consolidated city.

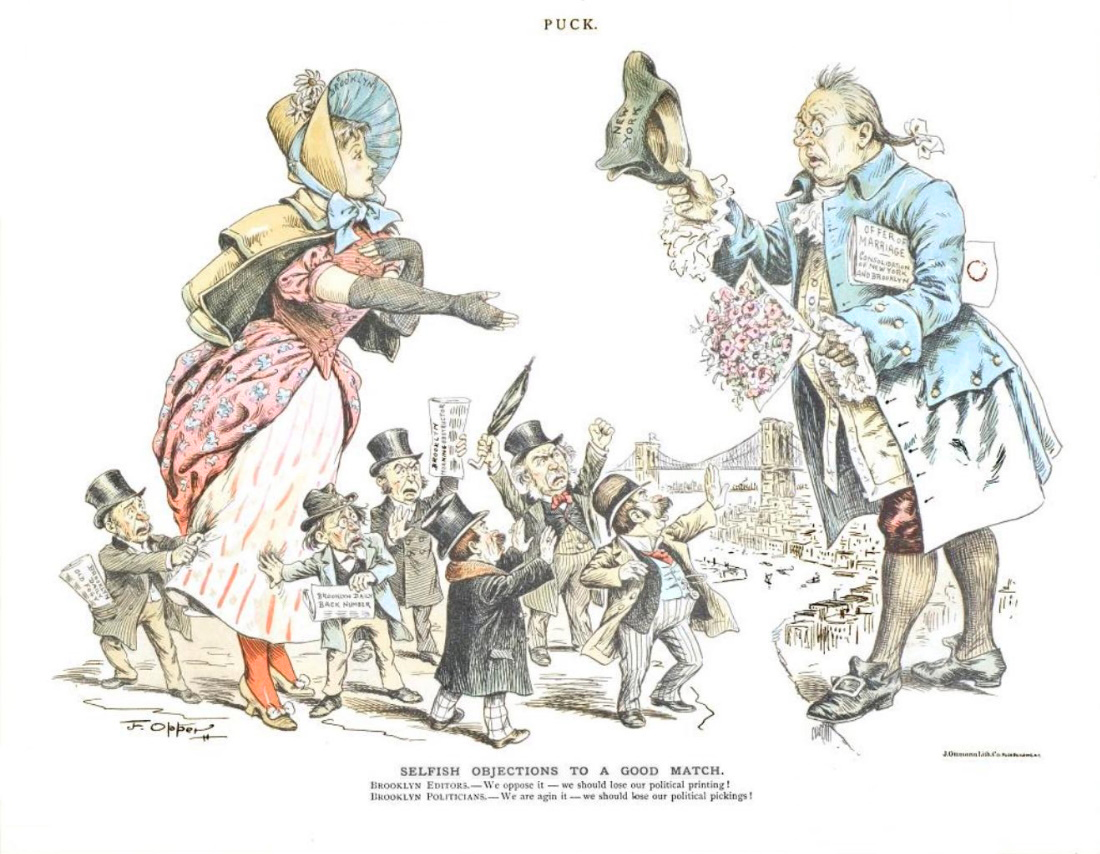
"Selfish Objections to a Good Match", Puck, 1893

The plan required a referendum in all affected areas, though the organizers of the referendum clearly had a bias towards the consolidation. They even released a full-page advertisement in The New York Times before the vote took place, urging them to vote "For Consolidation". An argument for consolidation was that the unconsolidated city would soon be surpassed by Chicago as the most populous city in the United States.

Opposition, concentrated in Brooklyn and other outlying districts, focused on loss of local control and fears of ethnic and racial minorities. Independence-minded Brooklynites did not want their regional identity to be overtaken by New York. Some newspapers such as the Brooklyn Daily Eagle argued that consolidation would destroy the mostly homogeneous, Protestant character of the city.

Opposing newspapers were accused of seeking to retain the revenues of official advertising, while opposing politicians were accused of graft. Concerns over how Brooklyn's water supply would be maintained and how future financial backing would be possible were legitimate. Considerations of finance and water supply prevailed, and the people of Brooklyn voted by a narrow margin to consolidate.

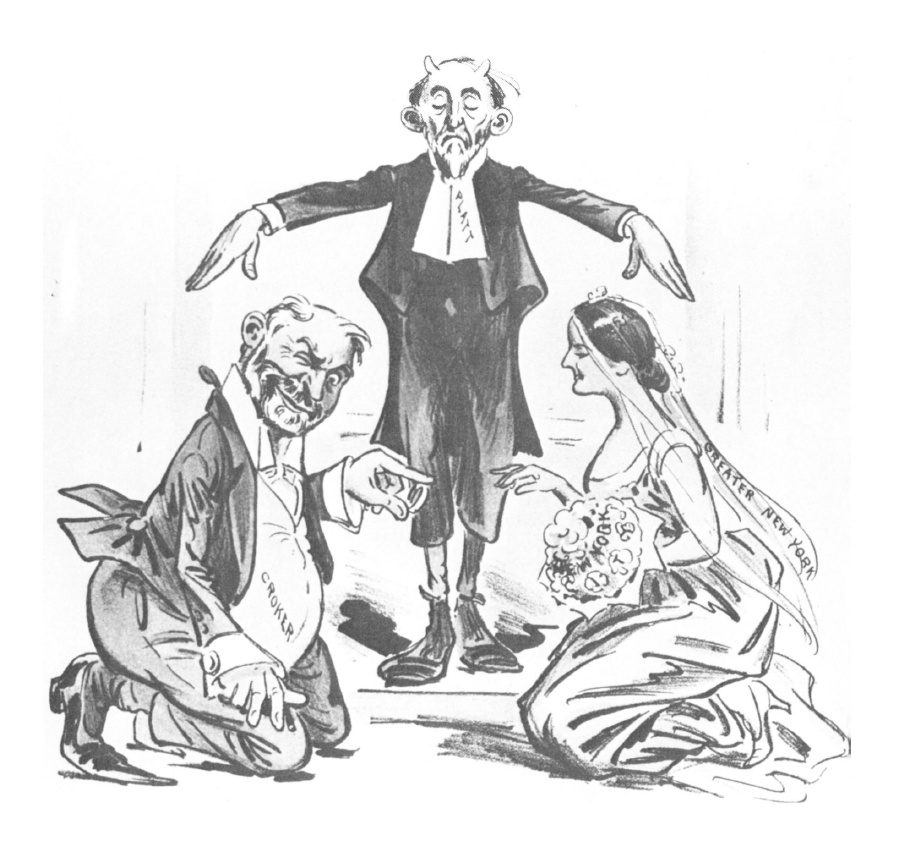
A satanic Thomas C. Platt presides over the marriage of Richard Croker to "Greater New York", 1898

The term City of Greater New York was never a legal or official designation; both the original charter of 1898 and the newer one of 1938 use the name of City of New York. It is used today only to refer to the time period when the consolidation took place.

Each consolidated county remained a county in relation to the state, but also became a borough within the city. The Bronx reunited to form a fifth borough that shared New York County with Manhattan. A separate Bronx County was established in 1914, making the present New York County co-extensive with the Borough (but not the island) of Manhattan.

== Consolidation referendum results ==
On December 14, 1894, the State Board of Canvassers released the official tally of the referendums, along with other races. The options listed on the ballot were "For Consolidation" and "Against Consolidation". The New York Times reported the results:

New York County Results
Choice	Votes	%
For	96,938	61.78
Against	59,959	38.22
Total	156,897	100.00
Valid votes	156,897	94.23
Invalid/blank votes	9,608	5.77
Total votes	166,505	100.00

Kings County Results
Choice	Votes	%
For	64,744	50.11
Against	64,467	49.89
Total	129,211	100.00
Valid votes	129,211	99.80
Invalid/blank votes	255	0.20
Total votes	129,466	100.00

Queens County Results
Choice	Votes	%
For	7,712	61.93
Against	4,741	38.07
Total	12,453	100.00
Valid votes	12,453	100.00
Invalid/blank votes	0	0.00
Total votes	12,453	100.00

Richmond County Results
Choice	Votes	%
For	5,531	78.61
Against	1,505	21.39
Total	7,036	100.00
Valid votes	7,036	99.93
Invalid/blank votes	5	0.07
Total votes	7,041	100.00

City of Mount Vernon Results
Choice	Votes	%
For	873	35.26
Against	1,603	64.74
Total	2,476	100.00
Valid votes	2,476	100.00
Invalid/blank votes	0	0.00
Total votes	2,476	100.00

Town of East Chester Results
Choice	Votes	%
For	374	58.99
Against	260	41.01
Total	634	100.00
Valid votes	634	100.00
Invalid/blank votes	0	0.00
Total votes	634	100.00

Town of Westchester Results
Choice	Votes	%
For	620	49.96
Against	621	50.04
Total	1,241	100.00
Valid votes	1,241	100.00
Invalid/blank votes	0	0.00
Total votes	1,241	100.00

Town of Pelham Results
Choice	Votes	%
For	251	62.13
Against	153	37.87
Total	404	100.00
Valid votes	404	100.00
Invalid/blank votes	0	0.00
Total votes	404	100.00

== Subsequent history ==
Since the enlarged city contained the majority of the state of New York's population, and the enlargement increased the city's already enormous power within the state, the state legislature established certain oversight powers within the city. For example, some issues of taxation and changes in governmental procedures require state approval or granting of specific home rule powers.

Conversely, the State Constitution was amended to provide that no city could elect the majority of the State Assembly, a provision later struck down by the U.S. Supreme Court in 1964 as violating the Fourteenth Amendment to the United States Constitution, and which would today be mooted by the fact that the city's population is now slightly below half that of the state. The New York City Board of Estimate, created in the consolidation charter with equal votes for each borough, was struck down on similar grounds in 1989.

=== Attempted Staten Island secession ===
Staten Island is geographically the most distant of the five boroughs, linked to the other four only by a single bridge, the Staten Island Ferry, and one NYC Ferry route. It is also not connected to the New York City Subway. In 1993, it held a non-binding referendum on the issue of seceding from New York City to become an independent city and county. Many Staten Island politicians, including Senator John J. Marchi and Assemblyman Eric N. Vitaliano supported the movement. Vote Yes, Inc. was formed as a nonpartisan, grass-roots organization in January 1990. Its initial purpose was to secure a "yes" vote for the November 1990 referendum on Staten Island secession.

Ultimately, 65% of Staten Island residents voted to secede, through the approval of a new city charter making Staten Island an independent city, but implementation was blocked in the State Assembly. The Staten Island secession movement was defused by the election of Rudy Giuliani as New York City mayor, who fulfilled two of the borough's biggest demands: making the Staten Island Ferry free in 1997 and closing the Fresh Kills Landfill in 2001.

The topic of Staten Island's secession continues to be debated into the 2020s, and borough president Vito Fossella announced in 2024 that his office would conduct a study to determine whether it was feasible for Staten Island to secede from the rest of the city. A study by the New York City Independent Budget Office the same year found that, if Staten Island were to secede, it would incur annual deficits of $171–199 million.

== See also ==
- List of former municipalities in New York City
- Boroughs of New York City
- History of New York City (1855–1897)
- History of New York City (1898–1945)
