= Southfield, Staten Island =

Coordinates: 40.6139°N 74.066°W

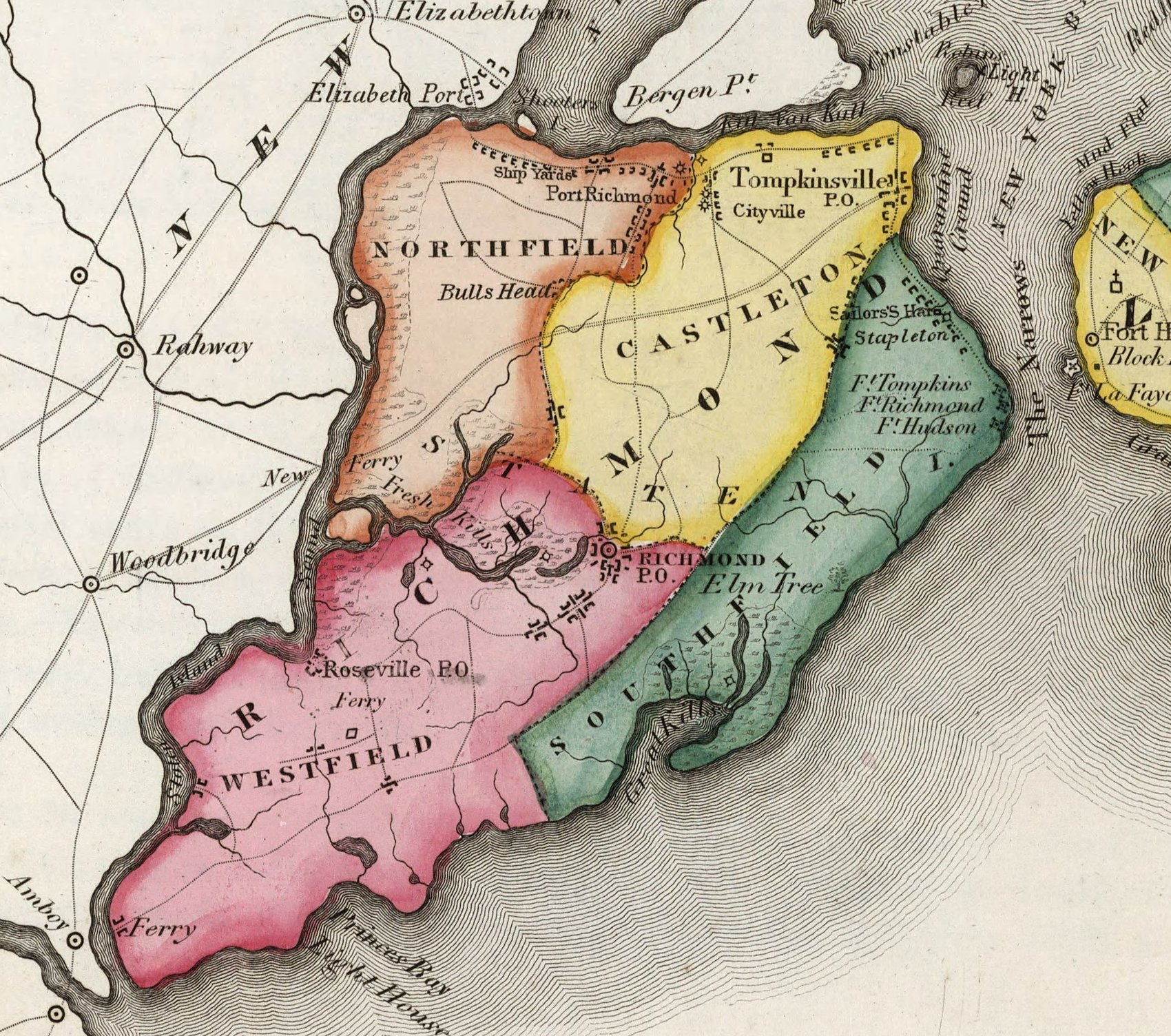
1849 map showing the four original cities on Staten Island, with Southfield in the East

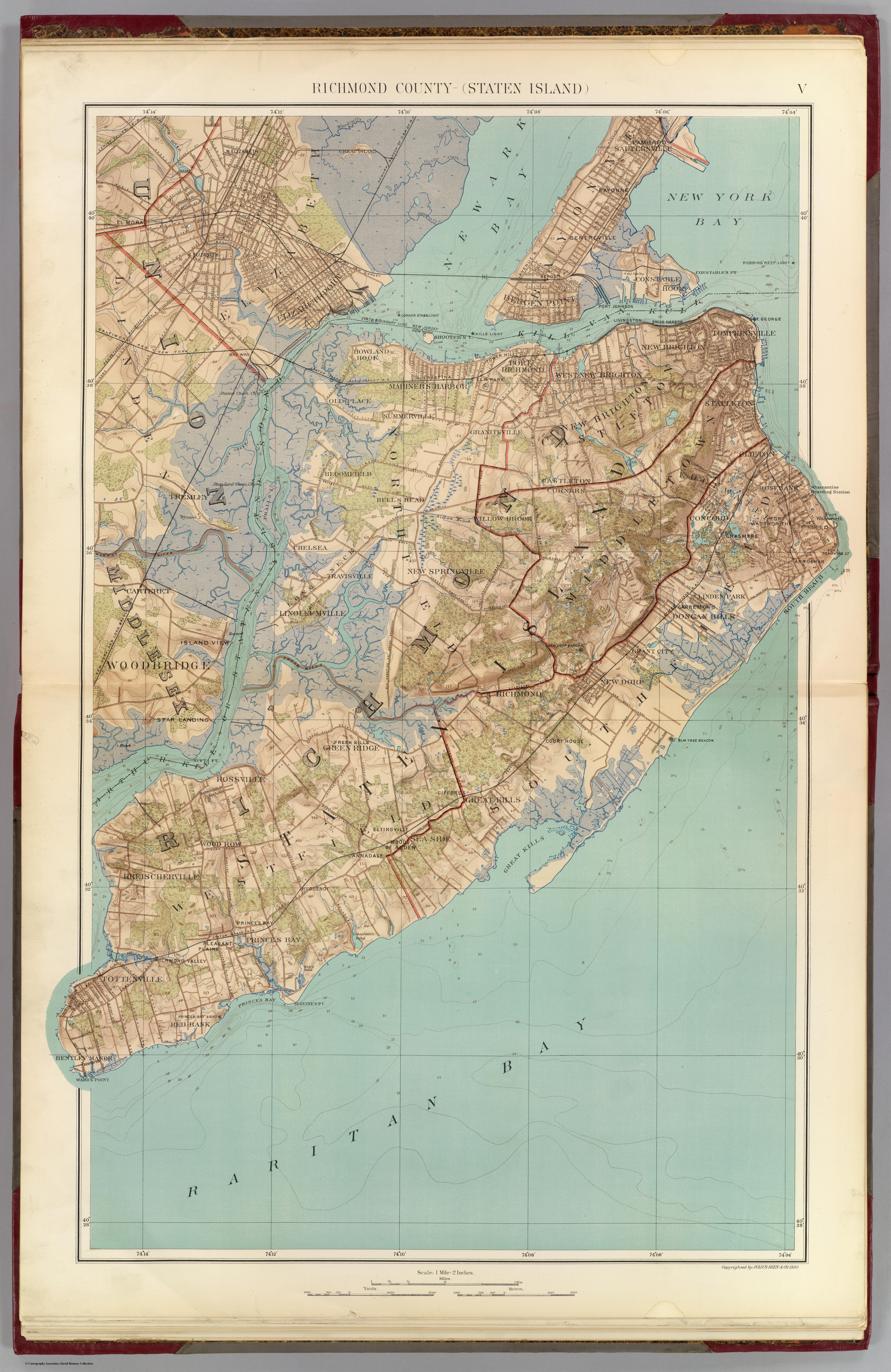
1891 map showing Southfield in the eastern portion of Richmond County

Southfield was a town in Richmond County, New York. It was located in the southeastern part of Staten Island, along Lower New York Bay prior to the incorporation of Staten Island into New York City in 1898, bounded on the west roughly by Richmond Road, Giffords Lane, Amboy Road, and Arden Avenue.

The town's origins dates to an administrative division of the island made by English colonists in the late 17th century, after they took over New Netherland from the Dutch in 1664. The town was incorporated as one of the four original divisions of Richmond County in 1788. In 1860, Middletown was created from parts of Southfield and Castleton. Fort Wadsworth is located in Southfield.

The town was dissolved in 1898 upon consolidation into the City of New York.

The present-day neighborhoods in the former town include:

- Arrochar
- Great Kills
- New Dorp
- South Beach

== See also ==
- Poillon-Seguine-Britton House
- List of Staten Island neighborhoods
- List of former municipalities in New York City
