= St. Peter's Church (Staten Island) =

Coordinates: 40°38′50″N 74°5′5″W

The Church of St. Peter
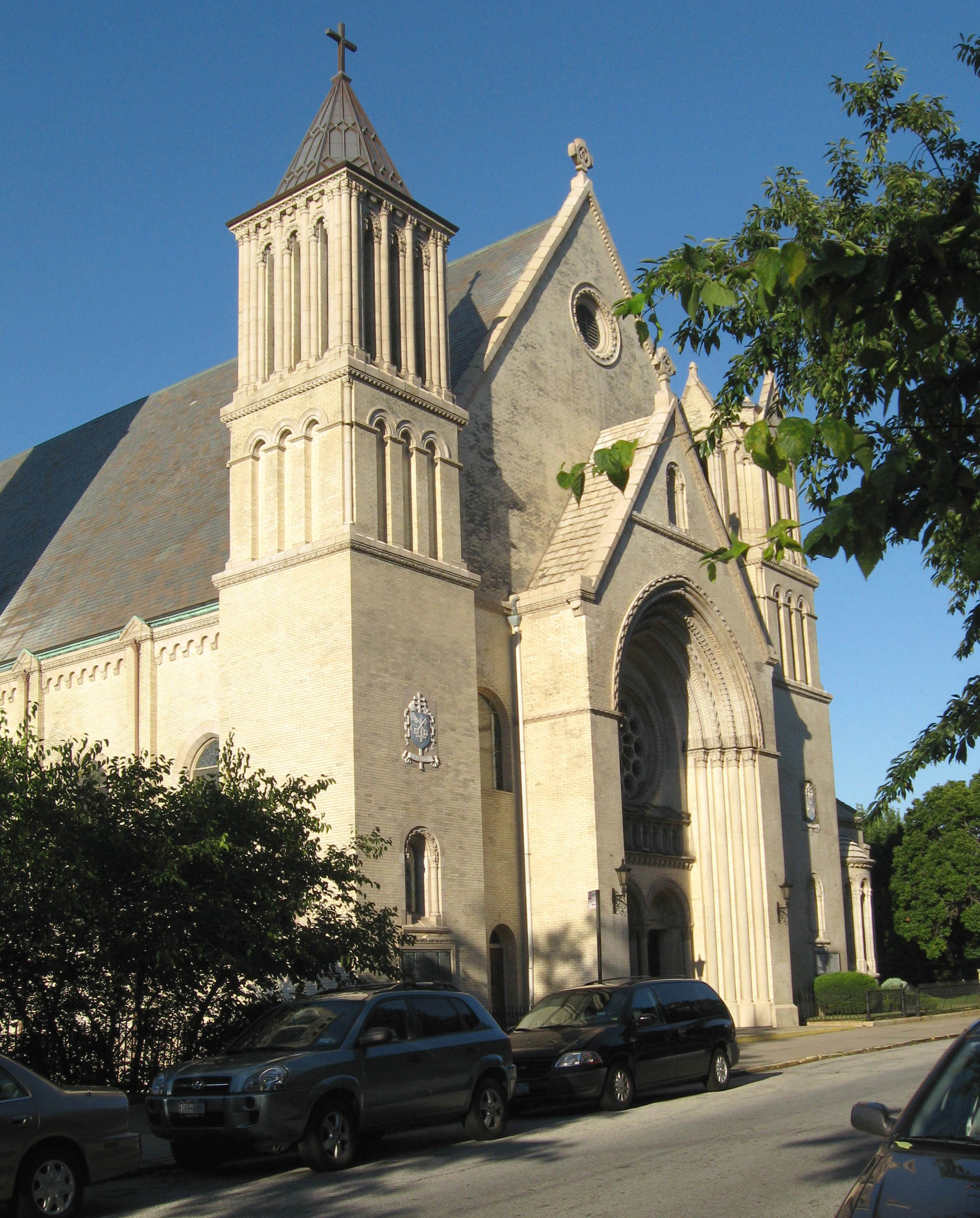
- 53 St Marks Place
- Interactive map of the The Church of St. Peter area

General information
- Architectural style: Romanesque Revival; Italianate
- Location: New Brighton, Staten Island, New York City, New York, United States
- Construction started: 1900
- Completed: 1903
- Client: Roman Catholic Archdiocese of New York

Design and construction
- Architects: George Edward Harding & Gooch (for church); George H. Streeton (for rectory)

The Church of St. Peter is a parish church under the authority of the Roman Catholic Archdiocese of New York, located in Staten Island, New York City in the neighborhood of New Brighton. St. Peter's is the oldest of the 36 Roman Catholic parishes on Staten Island, having been established in 1839, before the second-oldest St. Mary's (1852) and the third-oldest St. Joseph's (1855).

== History ==
St. Peter's is the mother church of Staten Island. It was established by Bishop John Dubois in March 1839.

The first pastor was Father Madrano, who arrived in March 1839. Land was leased on Carroll Place for church which was dedicated by Bishop John Hughes in September 1844. Medrano covered much of his territory on horseback. Worn out by work, he eventually returned to Spain.

The second pastor was the Rev. John Shanahan (1845). In 1846 Rev. James Roosevelt Bayley, nephew of Elizabeth Ann Seton and future Archbishop of Baltimore, was appointed pastor of St. Peter's, Staten Island. Two years later, St. Joseph's in Rossville was established in 1848 as a mission of St. Peter's Church by pastor Mark Murphy.

During the tenure of Rev. Timothy J. Earley seven acres of land was added to St. Peter's Cemetery. The cornerstone of a new church was laid in August 1900 by John Cardinal Farley, who had earlier served the parish in his first priestly assignment. The new building was completed by Thanksgiving Day of 1903.

St. Peter's celebrated its 175th anniversary in 2014. In 2015 the Church of the Assumption and St. Paul's Church merged with St. Peter's.

== Architecture ==
The current church building was designed by the firm of George Edward Harding & Gooch in neo-Romanesque style with Gothic accents. It was constructed from 1900 to 1903. The church stands on a hill, and is used as a landmark by seamen.

== Parish schools ==
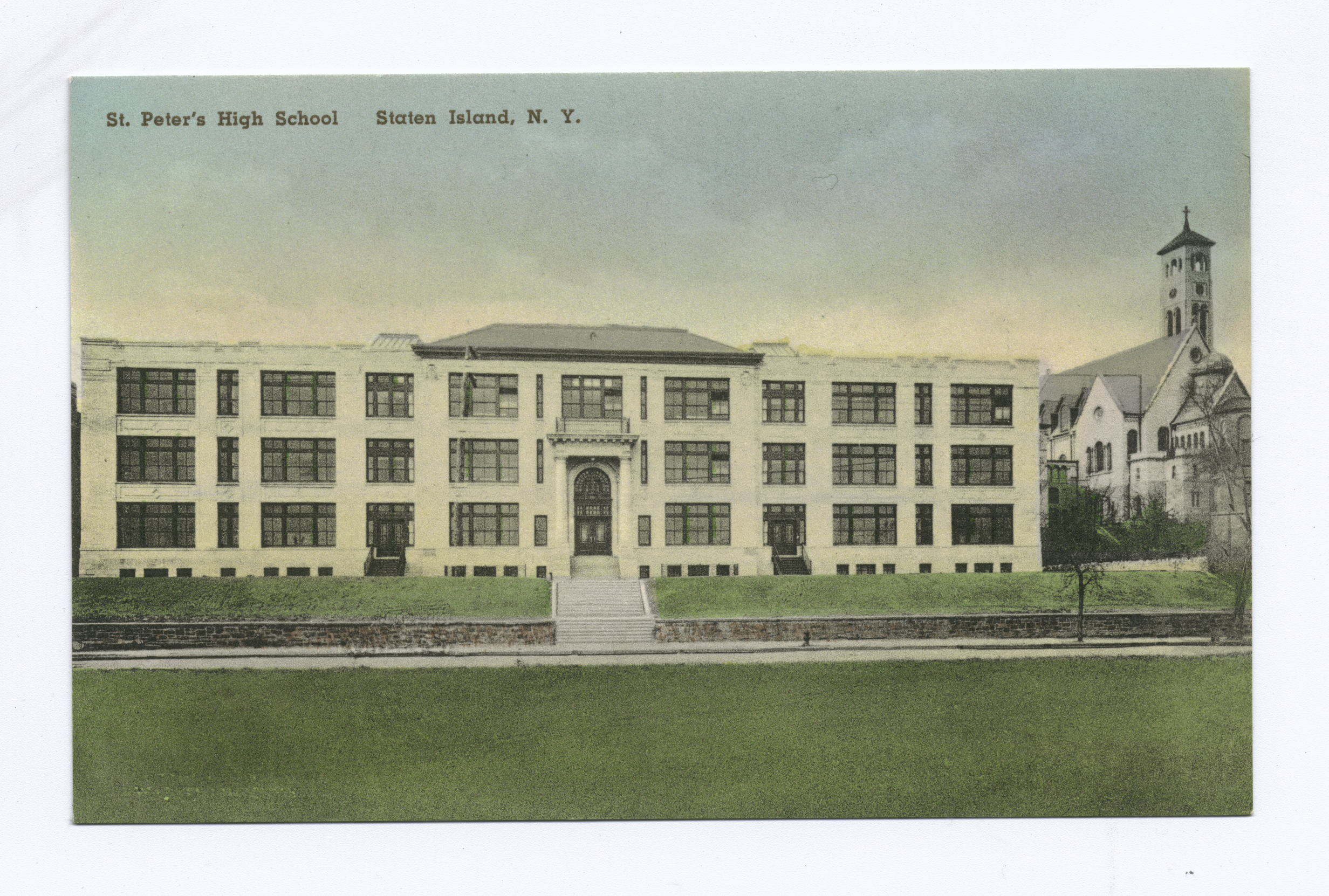
St. Peter's High School

Three parochial schools existed in the parish: St. Peter's Elementary School, St. Peter's Boys High School, and St. Peter's High School for Girls. In August 1853, the Sisters of Charity established a parish school in the church basement.

In the early 1950s, the De LaSalle Christian Brothers offered Seventh, Eighth and 9th Grade classes for boys in the Richmond Terrace building. Both the elementary and the girls' high school were closed in June 2011. The elementary school was moved to join St. Paul's School, now known as St. Peter – St. Paul. After extensive renovation, the Girls High School building reopened in September 2013 as a new public elementary school, leased by the NYC Department of Education.
