= Westfield, Staten Island =

Coordinates: 40.5027°N 74.2406°W

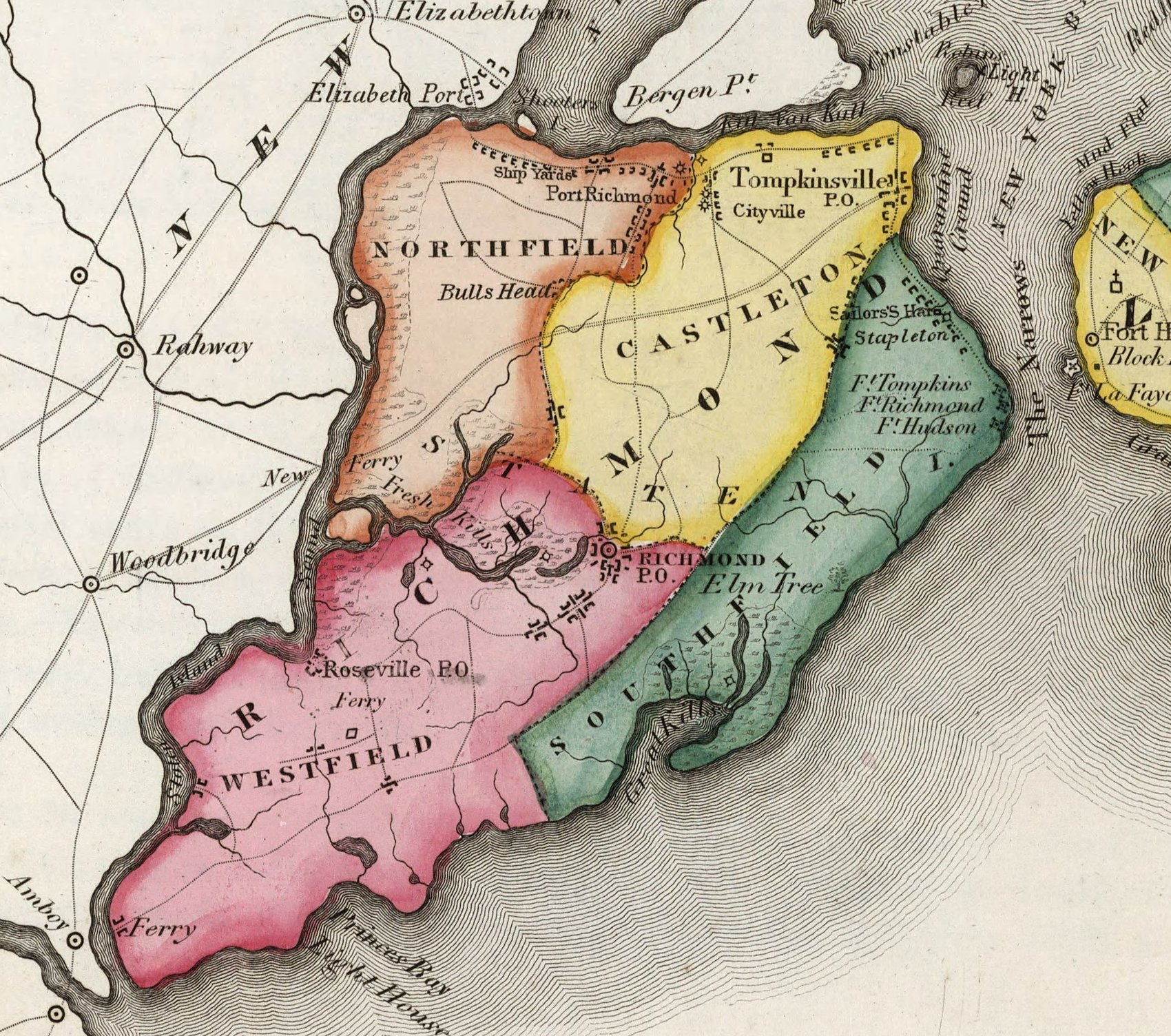
1849 map showing the four original cities on Staten Island, with Westfield in the Southwest

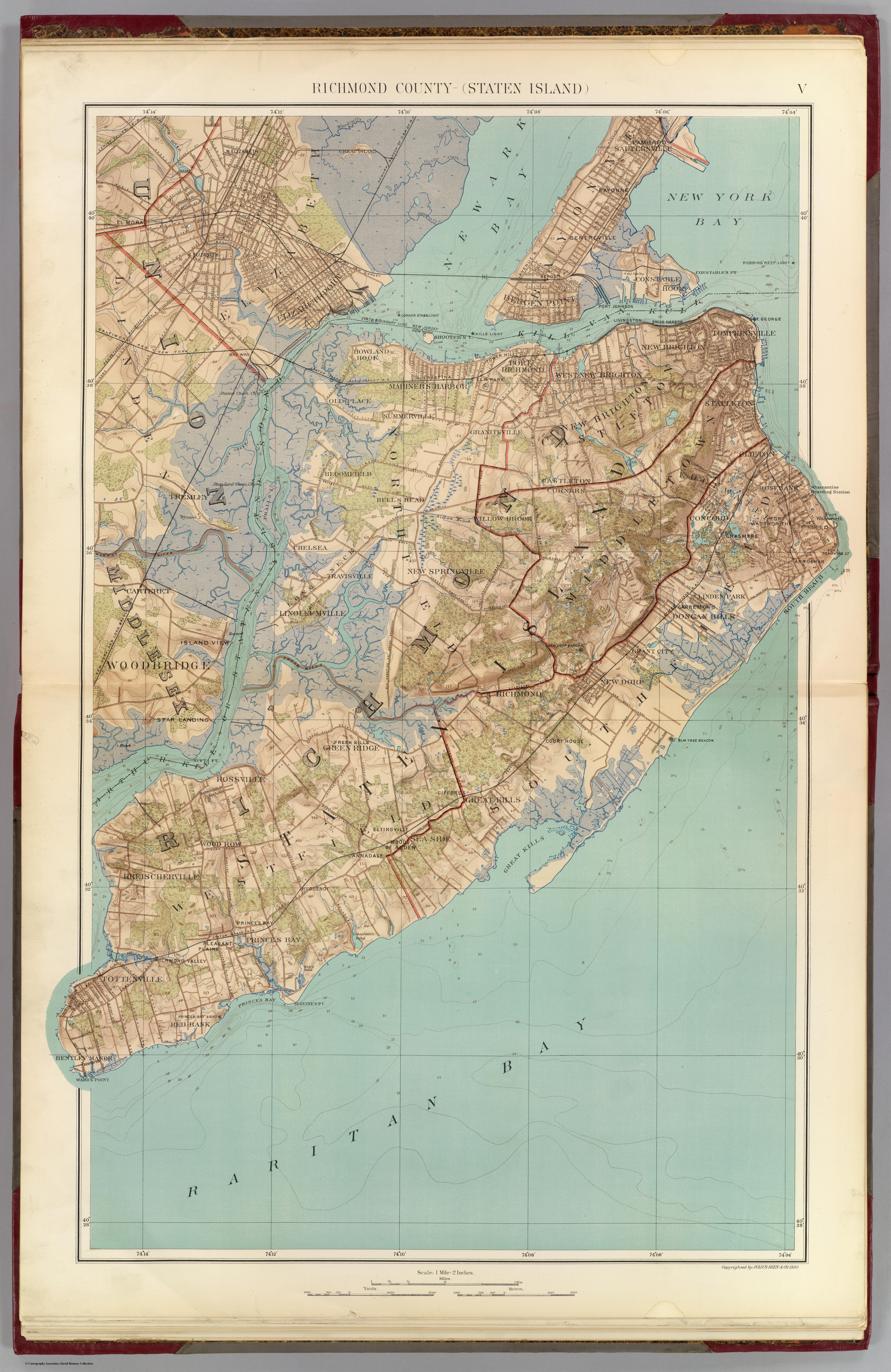
1891 map showing Westfield in the southwestern portion of Richmond County

Westfield was a town in Richmond County, New York. It was incorporated in 1788 as one of the four original towns of Staten Island. It was dissolved in 1898 upon consolidation into the City of New York.

== See also ==
- List of Staten Island neighborhoods
- List of former municipalities in New York City
