= St. Joseph's Church (Staten Island) =

Church and cemetery on Staten Island, NY, USA

Coordinates: 40°31′32.08″N 74°12′33.79″W

The Church of St. Joseph
- Interactive map of the The Church of St. Joseph area

General information
- Location: Rossville, Staten Island, New York City, New York, United States
- Completed: 1851 (for first chapel)
- Client: Roman Catholic Archdiocese of New York

The Church of St. Joseph of the Parish of St. Joseph-St. Thomas, is a Roman Catholic parish church in the Roman Catholic Archdiocese of New York, and the oldest extant Roman Catholic church on Staten Island. The nearby cemetery is the second-oldest Roman Catholic cemetery on the island. The church is located on Poplar Avenue in Rossville, Staten Island, New York City, New York.

== Parish history ==
St. Joseph's was established in 1848 as a mission of St. Peter's Church by that church's pastor, the Rev. Mark Murphy. Fr. Murphy celebrated the first Mass on July 2, 1848 for 58 Catholics in a house on Rossville Avenue. In 1851 a small chapel dedicated to St. Joseph was completed on Poplar Avenue. The mission was upgraded to parish status in 1855 and thereby the chapel upgraded to church status with Rev. Francis DeCaro, O.F.M., being appointed as first pastor. With its 1855 establishment, St. Joseph's is the third oldest of Staten Island's 36 parishes after St. Peter's and St. Mary's.

During the tenure of Father John Barry, a mission, St. Patrick's, was established at Richmond around 1860. St. Mary of the Assumption in Graniteville, originally established in 1853 as a mission of St. Peter's Church, became a mission church of St. Joseph's.

The parish of St. Joseph merged with St. Thomas the Apostle in 1959 to become the Parish of St. Joseph-St. Thomas, with two churches administered out of St. Thomas. St. Joseph's Church was substantially renovated in 1998. Originally founded for an Irish congregation, the parish reflects a number of ethnicities. A Mass in Italian is celebrated on the Feast of St Joseph.

=== Pastors of St. Joseph's ===
- Rev. Mark Murphy (1848-1855), pastor of St. Peter's Church, in charge of the mission of St. Joseph
- Rev. Francis DeCaro, O.F.M. (1855-1857)
- Rev. Bernard McCrossan (1857-1859)
- Rev. John Barry (1859 - 1877)
- Rev. C. Rigney, (?-1892), transferred to become pastor of the Church of Our Lady of Mercy (Bronx, New York)
- Rev. Peter J. Harold

=== St. Joseph's Cemetery ===
Located at the end of Barry Street, St. Joseph's Cemetery dates from 1848, and is the second-oldest Roman Catholic cemetery on the island.

== St. Thomas the Apostle ==
The Church of St. Thomas the Apostle, in the Pleasant Plains section, opened with Midnight Mass on Christmas Eve 1938. The church was destroyed by arson on Palm Sunday 1983, but a new Church of St. Thomas the Apostle opened on Christmas Eve 1995.
