= Northfield, Staten Island =

Coordinates: 40°35′50″N 74°09′40″W

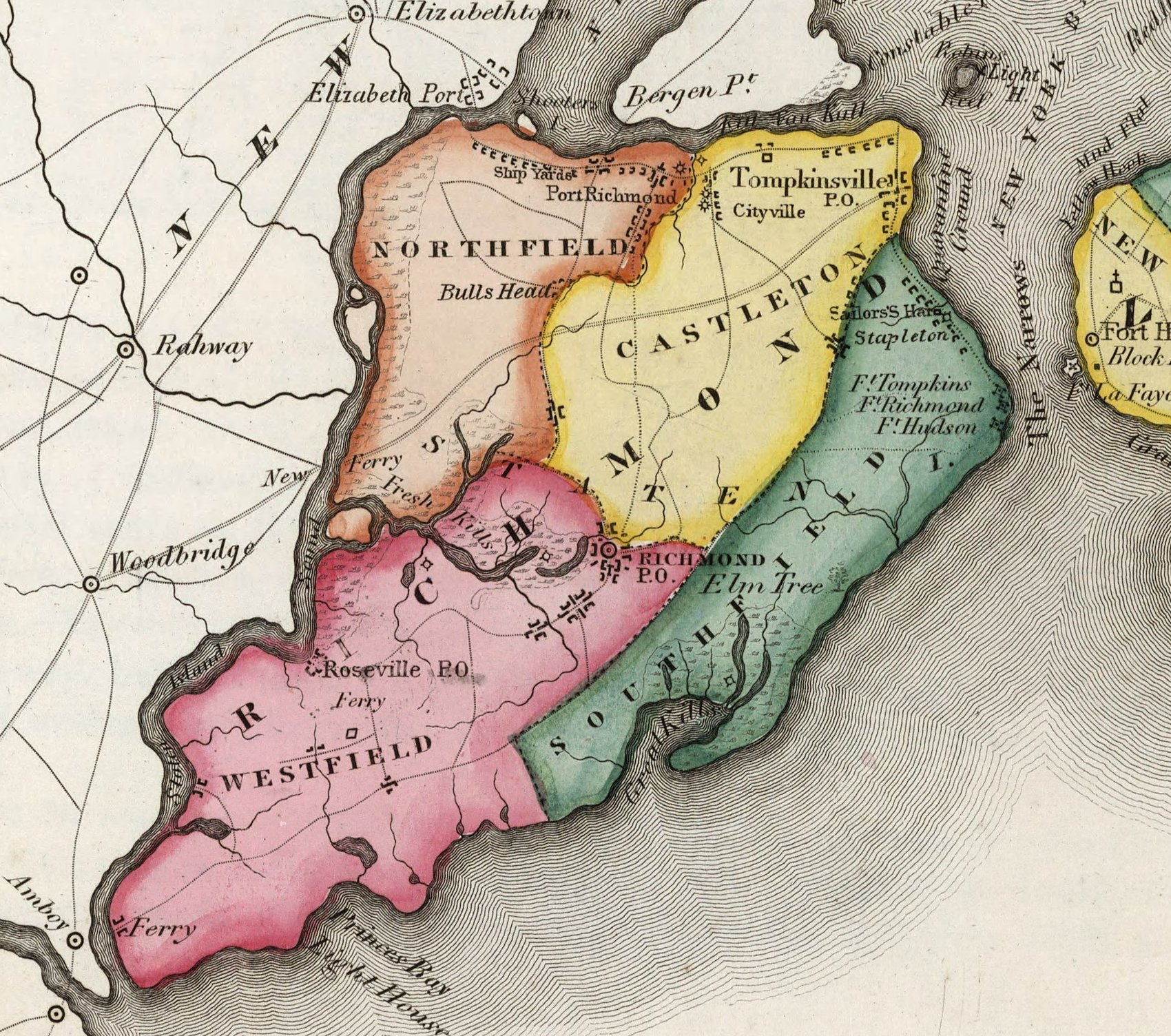
1849 map showing the four original towns on Staten Island, with Northfield in the Northwest

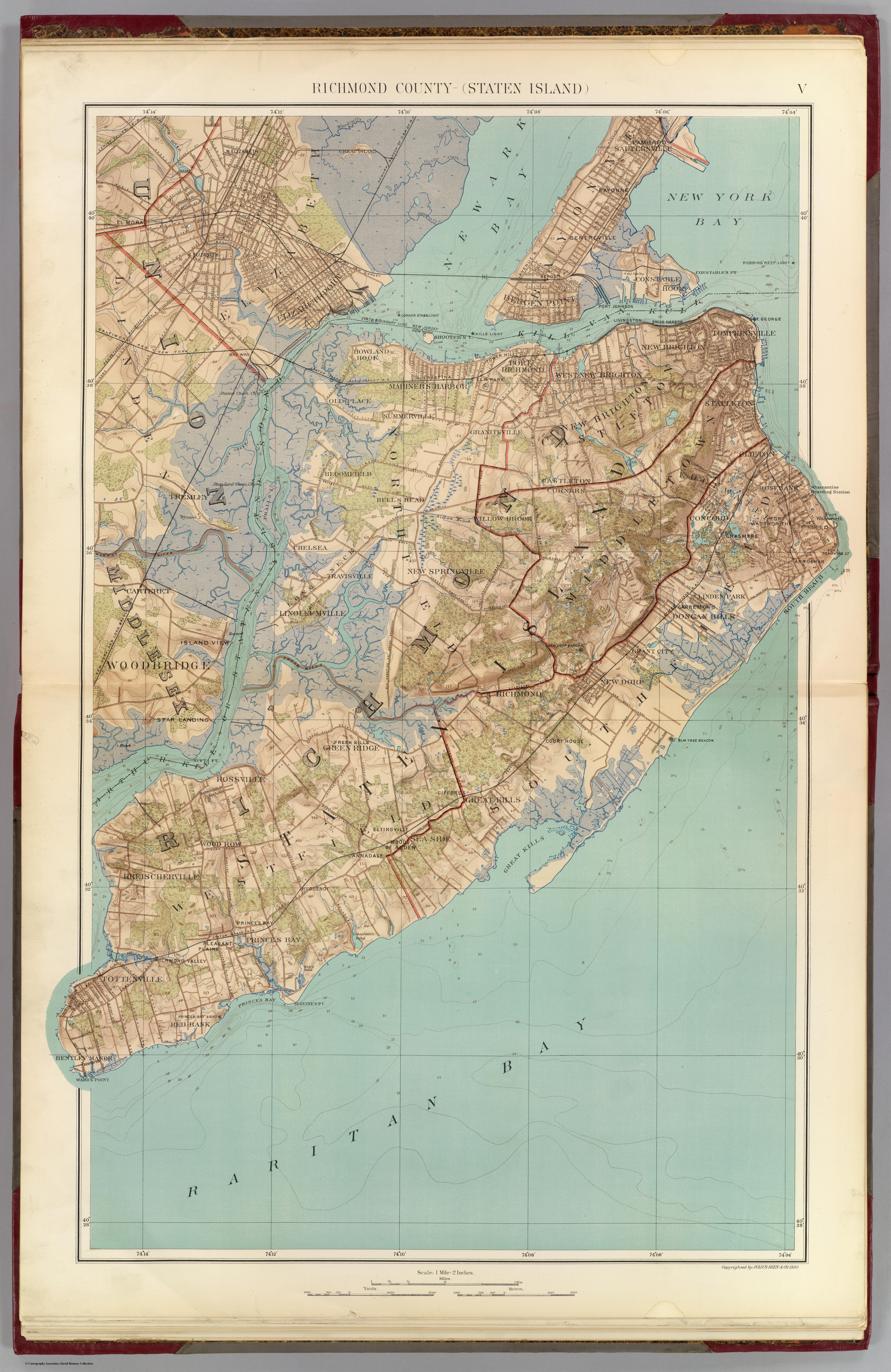
1891 map showing Northfield in the northwestern portion of Richmond County

Northfield was a town in Richmond County, New York. It was incorporated in 1788 as one of the four original towns of Staten Island. It was dissolved in 1898 upon consolidation into the City of New York.

== See also ==
- List of Staten Island neighborhoods
- List of former municipalities in New York City
