= Castleton, Staten Island =

Former town in New York, U.S.

Coordinates: 40°36′47″N 74°07′21″W

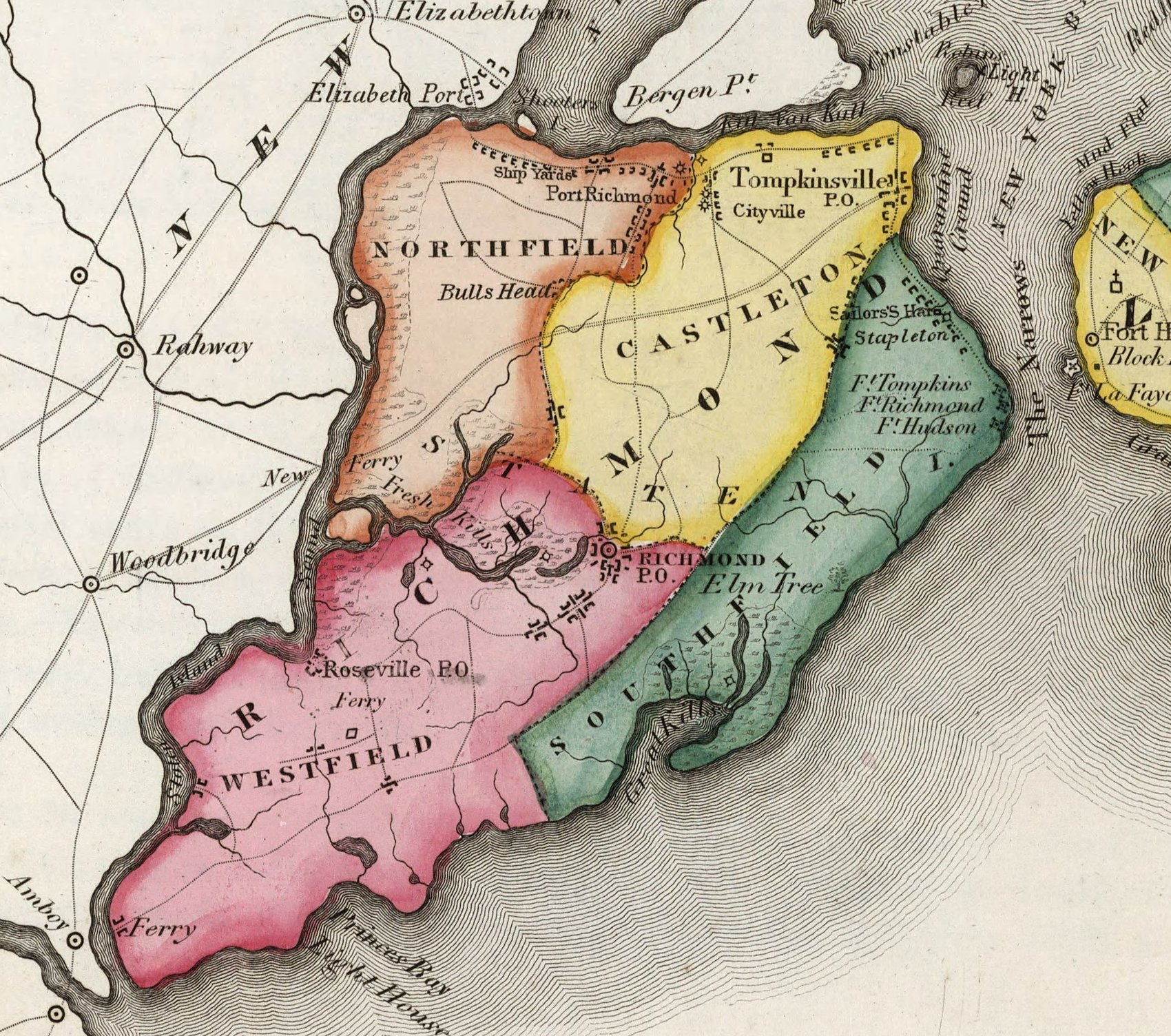
1849 map showing the four original towns on Staten Island, with Castleton in the Northeast

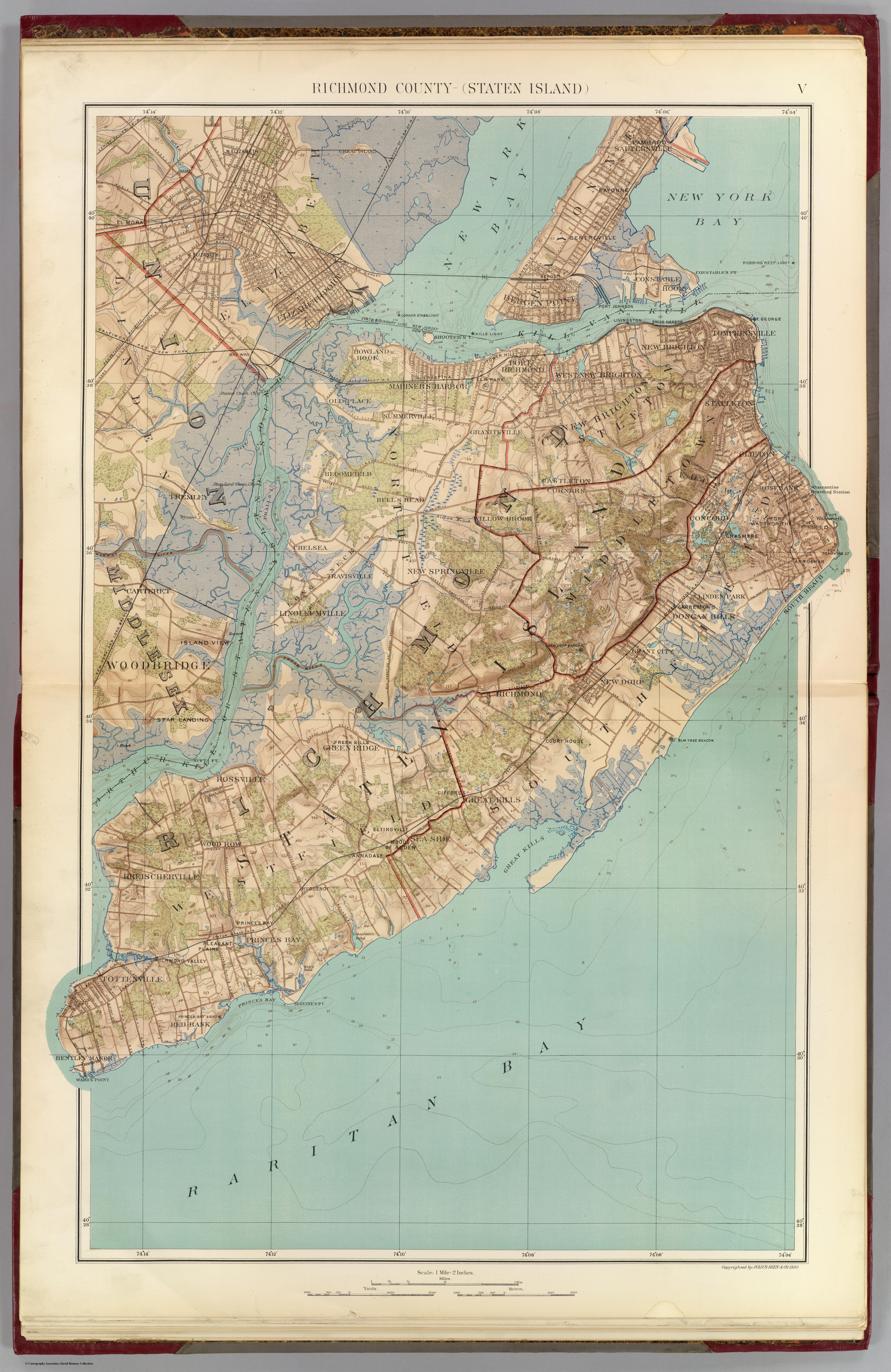
1891 map showing Castleton in the northeastern portion of Richmond County

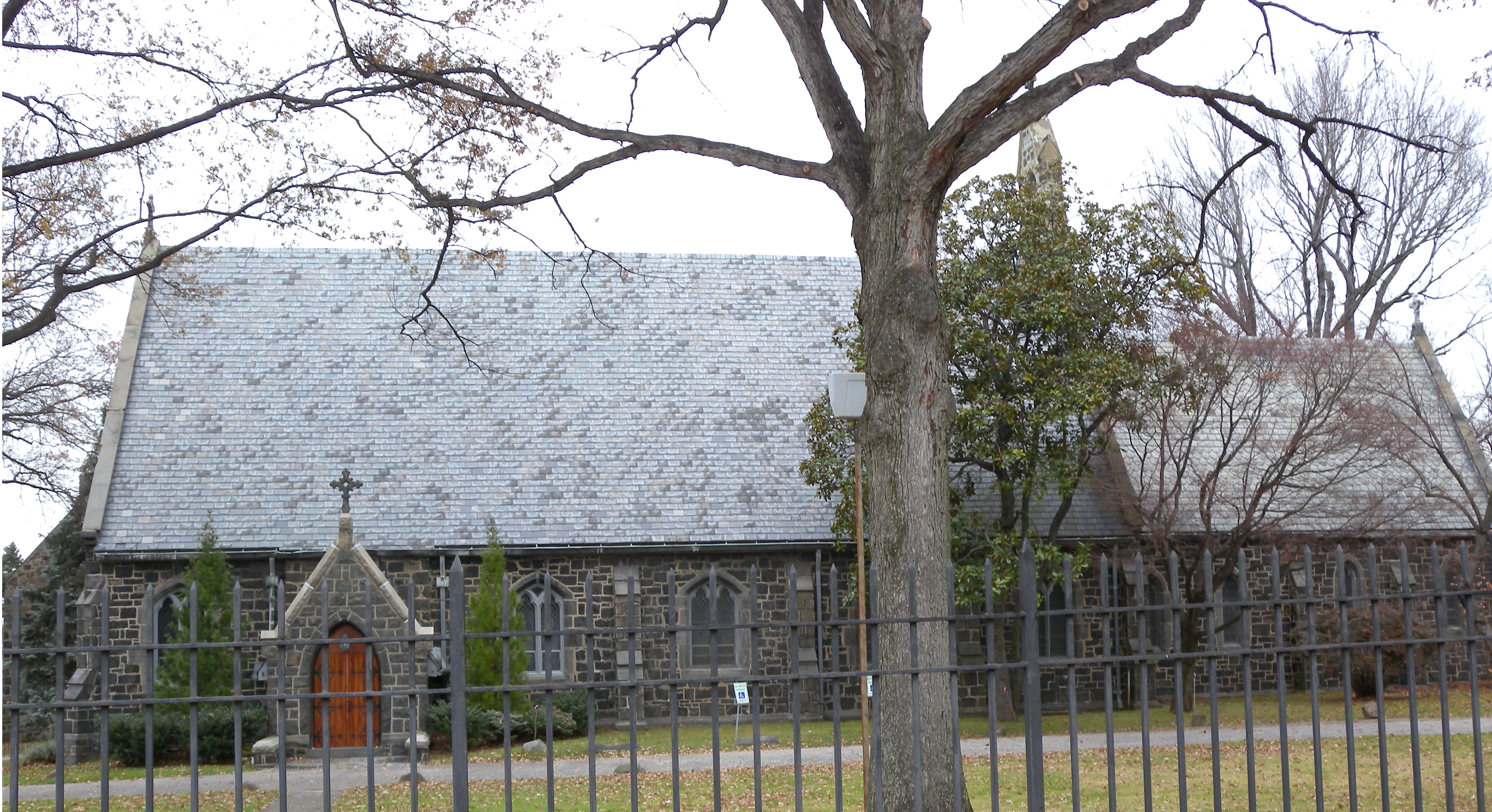
Saint Mary's Episcopal Church on Castleton Avenue

Castleton is a former town in the U.S. state of New York. It was located in the northeastern part of Staten Island prior to the incorporation of Staten Island into New York City in 1898. It had a total area of 3880 acres (15.7 km^{2}) and was bounded by Upper New York Bay on the east and the Kill Van Kull on the north.

The town dates from the late 17th century. It was originally set aside as the manor of the governor of the Province of New York and takes its name from the manor of Governor Thomas Dongan who named it for his home Castletown, in the town Kildrought (now Celbridge) in County Kildare, Ireland. The original manor house was constructed along Richmond Terrace, between Dongan Street and Bodine Street. It was destroyed by fire on December 25, 1878. The town was incorporated by the state of New York in 1788.

The town was dissolved in 1898 upon consolidation into the City of New York.

The former town included the present-day neighborhoods of

- Castleton Corners
- New Brighton
- St. George
- Silver Lake
- Tompkinsville

== See also ==
- List of Staten Island neighborhoods
- List of former municipalities in New York City
