= John Croak (politician) =

American politician

John Croak (October 25, 1846 – August 31, 1930) was an American lawyer, politician, and judge from New York.

== Life ==
Croak was born on October 25, 1846, in Elm Park, Staten Island, New York, the son of Irish immigrant Thomas Croak and Ann Murphy.

When Croak was young, he began studying law in the office of S. E. Church of Manhattan, followed by Brown & Estes in Manhattan. He attended and graduated from Albany Law School, where he was a classmate of future President William McKinley. He was admitted to the bar in 1867, and in 1870 he began practicing law in New York City. For twenty years, he had an office on 229 Broadway, where the Woolworth Building was later built. He also served as a counsel to the police commissioner and various public boards.

Croak served two terms as District Attorney. In 1890, he was elected to the New York State Assembly as a Democrat, representing Richmond County. He served in the Assembly in 1891. In 1898, when New York City was consolidated, Mayor Van Wyck appointed him the first city magistrate of Staten Island. He served as magistrate until 1920, when he retired. He was an active member of the Democratic Party, serving as first lieutenant to Nicholas Muller, the head of the Democratic Party in Staten Island.

Croak attended St. Mary's Church in Port Richmond. He was a member of the New York Law Institute, the New York State Bar Association, Richmond County Bar Association, and the State Fireman's Home. In 1872, Croak married Sarah McCoy. Their four children were Irving F., William T., John E., and Fred. William was himself a lawyer, assemblyman, and city magistrate.

Croak died at home in Port Richmond on August 31, 1930. He was buried in St. Mary's Church Cemetery.

Legal offices
Preceded by Sidney Fuller Rawson	Richmond County District Attorney; 1875–1880	Succeeded by George Gallagher
New York State Assembly
Preceded by Daniel T. Cornell	New York State Assembly; Richmond County; 1891	Succeeded by Hubbard R. Yetman
