= Robert S. Bainbridge =

American politician

Robert S. Bainbridge (January 21, 1913 – April 1959) was an American politician from New York.

== Life ==
He was born on January 21, 1913, in Staten Island, New York City, the son of John Keeble Bainbridge (1883–1948) and Adah (Wing) Bainbridge (1885–1927). He was an insurance broker. In 1935, he married Maxine Louis Ginder, of Dayton, Ohio, and they had two children.

Bainbridge was a member of the New York State Senate from 1943 to 1946, sitting in the 164th and 165th New York State Legislatures. In November 1947, he ran again for the State Senate but was defeated by Democrat John M. Braisted, Jr.

He died in 1959; and was buried at the Dayton Memorial Park in Dayton, Ohio.

== Sources ==
New York State Senate
Preceded by Robert E. Johnson	New York State Senate; 24th District; 1943–1944	Succeeded by Lazarus Joseph
Preceded by Frederic R. Coudert, Jr.	New York State Senate; 17th District; 1945–1946	Succeeded by Robert E. Johnson
