= Sidney Fuller Rawson =

American judge

Sidney Fuller Rawson (December 15, 1843 – March 20, 1916) was an American lawyer and judge from New York.

== Life ==
Rawson was born on December 15, 1843, in Schroon Lake, New York. He was the son of Ashley Pond Rawson, Justice of the Court of Sessions for Essex County, and Adaline Crego. He was a direct descendant of Edward Rawson, secretary of the Massachusetts Bay Colony.

After attending school and studying law under Cyrus Blanchard, Rawson initially worked as principal of a public school. This ended in June 1862, during the American Civil War, when he enlisted in the 118th New York Infantry Regiment. He served under Brigadier-General Isaac J. Wistar at Yorktown and under Major-General W. F. Smith at Drury's Bluff. He spent a lot of time serving as Chief Clerk of his division or post headquarters, and at one point was in charge of a large corps of clerks in the office of the U.S. Army Hospital in Point Lookout, Maryland. His military service ended in June 1865.

After the War, Rawson moved to Elizabethtown and began studying law under Byron Pond. He was admitted to the bar in 1867, at which point he moved to Staten Island and began practicing law with Lot C. Clark and Alfred De Groot, who had a law practice in Port Richmond and New York City. In 1871, he was elected District Attorney of Richmond County, an office he held for the next three years. In 1874, he unsuccessfully ran as a Democrat for County Judge and Surrogate. He then returned to his private law practice as part of the law firm DeGroot, Rawson & Stafford. He was also a director and counsel of the First National Bank of Staten Island, and served as counsel for the Richmond County Board of Police and Board of Supervisors, the Board of Trustees of New Brighton and Port Richmond, the Staten Island Building, Loan, and Savings Association, the Richmond County Savings Bank, the Staten Island Savings Bank, the Staten Island Academy, the S. R. Smith Infirmary, the Mariners' Family Asylum, and other corporations. In 1911, he was appointed County Judge and Surrogate following the death of Judge Stephens.

Rawson was a member of the Grand Army of the Republic. In 1869, he married Mary Louise Nicholson. Their children were Mary A., Edward Sidney, and Louise Windsor. Edward served as District Attorney of Richmond County.

Rawson died at his Port Richmond home on March 20, 1916, a few months after his son Edward. He was buried in the Moravian Cemetery in New Dorp, Staten Island.

Legal offices
Preceded by John H. Hedley	Richmond County District Attorney; 1872–1874	Succeeded by John Croak
