= District Attorney of Richmond County =

District Attorney of Richmond County, New York

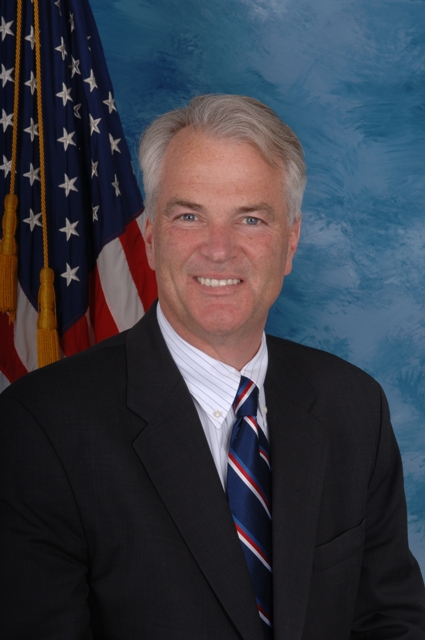
- Incumbent; Michael McMahon since January 1, 2016
- Formation: February 16, 1796
- First holder: Nathaniel Lawrence
- Deputy: Chief Assistant District Attorney, Ashleigh J. Owens
- Website: official website

The Richmond County District Attorney is the elected district attorney for Richmond County, coterminous with the Borough of Staten Island, in New York City. The office is responsible for the prosecution of violations of New York state laws, as violations of federal law in Richmond County are prosecuted by the U.S. Attorney for the Eastern District of New York. The current District Attorney is Michael McMahon.

== History ==
In a legislative act of February 12, 1796, New York State was divided into seven districts, each with its own Assistant Attorney General. Richmond County was part of the First District, which also included Kings, Queens, Suffolk, and Westchester counties. At that time, Queens County included much of present-day Nassau County, and Westchester County included present-day Bronx County. The Assistant Attorney General was renamed District Attorney on April 4, 1801, and New York County was added to the First District. Westchester was separated from the First District in 1813, and New York County was separated in 1815. The 13 districts that existed were divided so that each county became its own district by a law passed on April 21, 1818.

Until 1822, the district attorney was appointed by the Council of Appointment, and held the office "during the Council's pleasure", meaning that there was no defined term of office. Under the provisions of the New York State Constitution of 1821, the D.A. was appointed to a three-year term by the County Court, and under the provisions of the Constitution of 1846, the office became elective by popular ballot.

In case of a vacancy, the Governor of New York appoints an interim district attorney who serves until a successor is elected at the next annual election. The term was increased to four years for the Richmond County District Attorney in 1937.

== List of District Attorneys ==
District Attorney	Dates in Office	Party	Notes
Nathaniel Lawrence	February 16, 1796 – July 15, 1797	Dem.-Rep.	died
vacant	July 15, 1797 - January 16, 1798		
Cadwallader D. Colden	January 16, 1798 – August 19, 1801	Federalist	
Richard Riker	August 19, 1801 – February 13, 1810	Dem.-Rep.	
Cadwallader D. Colden	February 13, 1810 – February 19, 1811	Federalist	
Richard Riker	February 19, 1811 – March 5, 1813	Dem.-Rep.	
Barent Gardenier	March 5, 1813 – April 8, 1815	Federalist	
Thomas S. Lester	April 8, 1815 – June 11, 1818	?	
George Metcalfe	June 11, 1818	?	
Henry B. Metcalfe	1826	?	
Thomas S. Kingsland	1833	?	
George Catlin	1839	?	
Roderick N. Morrison	1840	?	
Lot C. Clark	1841 – 1849	?	appointed; elected to a three-year term; resigned
George Catlin	November 28, 1849	?	
George White	January 1, 1851 – December 31, 1853	?	elected to a three-year term
Alfred De Groot	January 1, 1854 – December 31, 1859	?	elected to two three-year term
Abraham W. Winant	January 1, 1860 – December 31, 1865	?	elected to two three-year terms
John H. Hedley	January 1, 1866 – December 31, 1871	?	elected to two three-year terms
Sidney Fuller Rawson	January 1, 1872 – December 31, 1874	Democratic	elected to a three-year term; did not run for re-election
John Croak	January 1, 1875 – December 31, 1880	Democratic	elected to two three-year terms
George Gallagher	January 1, 1881 – December 31, 1889	Democratic	elected to three three-year terms; lost the nomination to Fitzgerald at the county Democratic convention
Thomas W. Fitzgerald	January 1, 1890 – December 31, 1895	Democratic	elected to two three-year terms
George M. Pinney Jr.	January 1, 1896 – December 31, 1898	Republican	elected to a three-year term
Edward Sidney Rawson	January 1, 1899 – December 31, 1904	Democratic	elected to two three-year term
John J. Kenney	January 1, 1905 – December 31, 1907	Democratic	elected to a three-year term
Samuel H. Evins	January 1, 1908 – December 31, 1910	Democratic	elected to a three-year term
Albert C. Fach	January 1, 1911 – December 31, 1919	Democratic	elected to three three-year terms; did not run for re-election
Joseph H. Maloy	January 1, 1920 – January 1, 1924	Democratic	elected to two three-year terms; resigned to become a judge on the Court of Special Sessions
?	January 1, 1924 – February 9, 1924 (acting)		
Albert C. Fach	February 9, 1924 – December 31, 1925 (interim); January 1, 1926 – December 31, 1931	Democratic	appointed by Governor Al Smith for the remainder of the year; elected to the remainder of Maloy’s term; elected to two three-year terms
Thomas J. Walsh	January 1, 1932 – December 30, 1936	Democratic	elected to two three-year terms; resigned to accept the seat as a municipal court judge to which he had been elected in November
?	December 31, 1936 – January 6, 1937 (acting)		
Frank H. Innes	January 7, 1937 – December 31, 1937 (interim); January 1, 1938 – December 31, 1941	Democratic	appointed by Governor Herbert H. Lehman for the remainder of Walsh’s term; elected to a four-year term
Farrell M. Kane	January 1, 1942 – August 4, 1947	Democratic	elected to a four-year term, then to a four-year term; resigned to accept a nomination to in the primary election for City Court Judge
Herman Methfessel	August 4, 1947 – August 13, 1947 (acting)	Democratic	became acting district attorney upon Kane’s resignation
Robert E. Johnson	August 13, 1947 – December 31, 1947 (interim)	Republican	appointed by Governor Dewey to serve the remainder of the year; lost election to Methfessel
Herman Methfessel	January 1, 1948 – December 31, 1951	Democratic	elected to a four-year term; lost election to Simonson
Sidney O. Simonson	January 1, 1952 – December 31, 1955	Republican-Liberal	elected to a four-year term over Methfessel; lost election to Braisted
John M. Braisted Jr.	January 1, 1956 – December 31, 1975	Democratic-Liberal	elected to five four-year terms; retired, did not run for re-election
Thomas R. Sullivan	January 1, 1976 – November 1982	Democratic-Conservative	elected to two three-year term; resigned to run for a seat as a New York Supreme Court justice
William L. Murphy	November 1982 – March 1983 (acting); March 1983 – December 31, 1983 (interim); January 1, 1984 – December 31, 2003	Democratic-Conservative	became acting district attorney upon Sullivan’s resignation; appointed by Governor Mario M. Cuomo for the remainder of Sullivan’s term; elected to five four-year terms; retired, did not run for re-election
Daniel M. Donovan, Jr.	January 1, 2004 – May 12, 2015	Republican	elected to three four-year terms; resigned after winning a special election for an open congressional seat
Daniel L. Master, Jr.	May 12, 2015 – December 31, 2015 (acting)	Republican	became acting district attorney after Donovan’s resignation
Michael McMahon	January 1, 2016 – current	Democratic	elected to three four-year terms
