= Harry J. Palmer =

American politician

Member of the New York State Senate from the 27th district
- In office 1929–1934

Chairman of the Committee on Internal Affairs of Towns, Counties and Public Highways
- In office 1933–1934

Personal details
- Born: February 28, 1872 Dover, New Jersey, U.S.
- Died: February 12, 1948 New York City, New York, U.S.

Harry J. Palmer (February 28, 1872 – February 12, 1948) was an American politician from New York.

== Life ==
He was born on February 28, 1872, in Dover, Morris County, New Jersey, the son of Charles E. Palmer and Anne (Cowley) Palmer. His father died in 1878, and he and his mother moved to Philadelphia, Pennsylvania, in 1880. There he attended the public schools, and then began to work at a department store.

He moved to Port Richmond, Staten Island.

Palmer was a member of the New York State Senate (24th D.) from 1929 to 1934, sitting in the 152nd, 153rd, 154th, 155th, 156th and 157th New York State Legislatures; and was Chairman of the Committee on Internal Affairs of Towns, Counties and Public Highways from 1933 to 1934.

He died on February 12, 1948, at his home in Staten Island.

== Sources ==
New York State Senate
Preceded by Thomas J. Walsh	New York State Senate; 24th District; 1929–1934	Succeeded by Rae L. Egbert
