= John M. Braisted Jr. =

American lawyer and politician

Member of the New York Senate from the 17th district
- In office January 1, 1947 – December 31, 1952
- Preceded by: Robert E. Johnson
- Succeeded by: John G. Macdonald

District Attorney of Richmond County
- In office January 1, 1956 – December 31, 1975
- Preceded by: Sidney O. Simonson
- Succeeded by: Thomas R. Sullivan

Personal details
- Born: March 13, 1907 Staten Island, New York, U.S.
- Died: December 9, 1997 (aged 90) Staten Island, New York, U.S.
- Party: Democratic

John M. Braisted, Jr. (March 13, 1907 – December 9, 1997) was an American lawyer and politician from New York.

== Life ==
He was born on March 13, 1907, in Port Richmond, Staten Island, New York. In 1931, he married Helen Pettigrew (died 1987), and they had two sons. He practiced law in New York City and entered politics as a Democrat.

He was a member of the New York State Senate (17th D.) from 1948 to 1952, sitting in the 166th, 167th and 168th New York State Legislatures. In November 1952, he ran for re-election, but was defeated by Republican John G. MacDonald.

He was District Attorney of Richmond County from 1956 to 1975. As such, he was a party in De Veau v. Braisted, a 1960 U.S. Supreme Court case.

He died on December 9, 1997, at the home of his son James in West Brighton, Staten Island.

New York State Senate
| Preceded by Robert E. Johnson | New York State Senate; 17th District; 1948–1952 | Succeeded by John G. Macdonald |
Legal offices
| Preceded by Sidney O. Simonson | Richmond County District Attorney; 1956–1975 | Succeeded by Thomas R. Sullivan |
