= Rae L. Egbert =

American politician

- Born: Rae Livingston Egbert; August 15, 1891; Staten Island, New York, U.S.
- Died: May 11, 1964 (aged 72); Stapleton, Staten Island, New York, U.S.
- Occupations: businessman and politician from New York

Rae Livingston Egbert (August 15, 1891 – May 11, 1964) was an American businessman and politician from New York.

== Early years ==
He was born on August 15, 1891, on Staten Island, New York, the son of George L. Egbert (1862–1957) and Ella L. Turner (died 1919), and a descendant of the farming family for which Egbertville is named. He attended the public schools on Staten Island, and Mount Hermon School. In 1911, he began to work in his father's haberdashery in Tompkinsville. During World War I, he enlisted as a private in the U.S. Army, and remained stationed at Fox Hills, on Staten Island. He finished the war as a sergeant major.

== Career ==
Egbert was a member of the New York State Senate (24th D.) from 1935 to 1940, sitting in the 158th, 159th, 160th, 161st and 162nd New York State Legislatures. He was defeated for re-election in 1940 and 1942. In 1944, he ran for Congress in the 16th District but was defeated by Republican Ellsworth B. Buck.

In 1958, he removed to Gulfport, Florida.

== Family life ==
On June 4, 1917, he married Olive Doll, and they had one daughter: Joan Egbert.

== Death ==
He died on May 11, 1964, while on a visit at his sister Grace's home in Stapleton, Staten Island.

== Sources ==
New York State Senate
Preceded by Harry J. Palmer	New York State Senate; 24th District; 1935–1940	Succeeded by Robert E. Johnson
