= George M. Pinney Jr. =

American politician

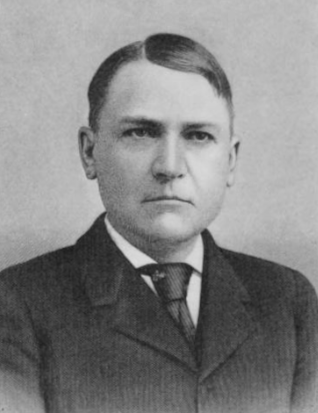
- Born: March 8, 1856; Windsor, Wisconsin, US
- Died: July 18, 1921 (aged 65); Dongan Hills, New York, US
- Education: Racine College; General Russell's Collegiate and Commercial Institute; University of California, Berkeley; Harvard Law School
- Occupation: Lawyer
- Political party: Republican
- Spouse: Olive Frances Child (m. 1887)
- Children: 4

George Miller Pinney Jr. (March 8, 1856 – July 18, 1921) was an American lawyer.

== Life ==
Pinney was born on March 8, 1856, in Windsor, Wisconsin. His father, George M. Sr., worked in mining operations for many years and was a marshal for the Montana Territory and Dakota Territory under President Abraham Lincoln. His mother was Harriet Whitney.

Pinney attended Racine College in Wisconsin, General Russell's Collegiate and Commercial Institute in New Haven, Connecticut, a common school in Helena, Montana, an academy in Iowa, and the University of California. He then attended Harvard College, graduating from there with honors and a B.A. in 1878. He spent the two years working as a Tutor in St. Mark's School in Southborough, Massachusetts, and DeVeaux College in New York. He then attended Harvard Law School, graduating from there with honors in 1882.

After graduating, Pinney moved to New York City, New York, where he worked for the law firm Evarts, Southmayd & Choate and its successor Evarts, Choate & Beaman, where he worked until 1886. He then formed a law firm with Willis B. Sterling called Pinney & Sterling. The firm ended in 1890, and a year later he joined the firm Carter, Pinney & Kellogg. This firm was dissolved in 1893, and he had an independent practice for nearly a year. He then formed a partnership with fellow Harvard alumnus Aaron C. Thayer that was later known Pinney, Thayer & Hadlock. He was involved in several notable cases, including the 1892 Holland House case, the eviction of General Earle from the Hotel New Netherland, and the contest over the will of Mrs. A. T. Stewart. He represented several prominent corporations, including the Gorham Manufacturing Company, W. & J. Sloane, the Rocky Fork & Cooke City Railway Company of Montana, the Phoenix Furniture Company of Grand Rapids, Michigan, and the Rawhide Gold Mining Company of Boston.

Pinney resided in New Brighton, Staten Island since 1888, and was an active member of the local Republican Party. In 1895, he was elected town supervisor of Castleton and District Attorney of Richmond County. In 1896, Governor Morton appointed him a member of the Greater New York Commission, and in the first meeting of the Commission he was elected secretary. In 1900, he became head of the firm Pinney, Thayer & Van Slyke. During World War I, he was a member of the police reserves, head of the local draft board, chairman of the Legal Aid Society that cared for the insurance of soldiers, and frequently spoke on behalf of Liberty Loan drives.

Pinney was a member of the Protestant Episcopal Church. He was a member of Phi Beta Kappa, the University Club of New York, the Harvard Club of New York, the Winnisook Club, the Richmond County Country Club, the Richmond County Bar Association, and the New York State Bar Association. In 1887, he married Olive Frances Child of Worcester, Massachusetts. Their children were George Miller, Elizabeth, Humphrey, and William Whitney. The sons all served in the military during World War I, two in the Army and one in the Navy.

Pinney died at his home in Dongan Hills on July 18, 1921. He was buried in St. Andrew's Church cemetery.

Legal offices
Preceded by Thomas W. Fitzgerald	Richmond County District Attorney; 1896–1898	Succeeded by Edward Sidney Rawson
