= William L. Murphy =

American lawyer

Richmond County District Attorney
- In office November 1982 – December 31, 2003
- Preceded by: Thomas R. Sullivan
- Succeeded by: Daniel M. Donovan, Jr.

Personal details
- Born: William Leo Murphy; June 25, 1944 Chicago, Illinois, U.S.
- Died: June 4, 2010 (aged 65) Staten Island, New York, U.S.
- Party: Democratic
- Spouse: Kathleen Brushett
- Education: Fordham University (B.A.); Harvard University (J.D.)

William Leo Murphy (June 25, 1944 – June 4, 2010) was the Richmond County District Attorney (in Staten Island, New York) from 1983 to 2003.

== Early life and education ==
Murphy was born in Chicago. His parents were originally from Staten Island and returned there before his first birthday. His father served as a grand juror in Richmond County for 25 years, and his grandfather was a police officer.

He received his undergraduate education from Fordham University and his law degree from Harvard Law School.

== Career ==
Murphy was a public prosecutor in the New York County District Attorney's office from 1969 to 1975. From 1975 to 1982, he was the chief assistant district attorney in Staten Island. In November 1982, he became acting district attorney when Thomas R. Sullivan resigned to become a judge. He was appointed as district attorney by Governor Mario Cuomo in March 1983 and then continued in the position for 20 years, through five elections. New York City Mayor Michael Bloomberg called him a "legendary public servant" upon his death.

He advocated for strict environmental regulations and legislation after prosecuting John Cassiliano, a sanitation supervisor at the Brookfield landfill who took bribes in exchange for allowing illegal dumping of toxic waste, in 1982. In 1988, he prosecuted Andre Rand, who was convicted of kidnapping and murdering a 12-year-old girl with Down syndrome. In 2003, he prosecuted Ronnell Wilson, who was convicted and served the death penalty for murdering two undercover detectives. Murphy retired shortly afterward. While serving as District Attorney, Murphy suffered from diabetes and needed a new kidney. Two staff members in the Richmond County District Attorney's office donated a kidney to Murphy but both kidney transplants were not successful.

Murphy was elected president of the National Association of District Attorneys in 1998.

Legal offices
Preceded by Thomas R. Sullivan	Richmond County District Attorney; 1982–2003	Succeeded by Daniel M. Donovan, Jr.
