= Dan Donovan (politician) =

American politician & attorney (born 1956)

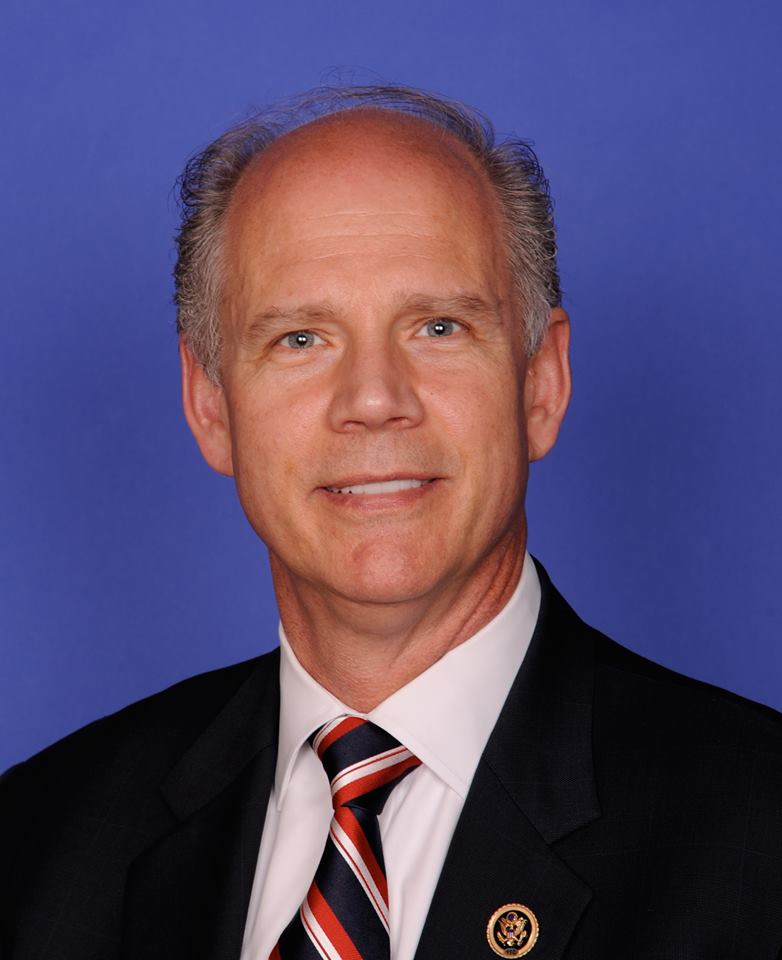
- Official portrait, 2015

Member of the U.S. House of Representatives from New York's 11th district
- In office May 5, 2015 – January 3, 2019 (Note: Donovan's official service begins on the date of the special election, while he was not sworn in until May 12, 2015.)
- Preceded by: Michael Grimm
- Succeeded by: Max Rose

District Attorney of Richmond County
- In office January 1, 2004 – May 5, 2015
- Preceded by: William L. Murphy
- Succeeded by: Daniel Master (acting)

Deputy Borough President of Staten Island
- In office January 1, 2002 – December 31, 2003
- President: James Molinaro
- Preceded by: James Molinaro
- Succeeded by: Daniel Master (acting)

Personal details
- Born: Daniel Michael Donovan Jr. November 6, 1956 (age 70) New York City, New York, U.S.
- Party: Republican
- Education: St. John's University (BA); Fordham University (JD)

Daniel Michael Donovan Jr. (born November 6, 1956) is an American attorney, former prosecutor and politician. A member of the Republican Party, he served as the U.S. representative for New York's 11th congressional district from 2015 to 2019. Donovan served as District Attorney of Richmond County from 2004 to 2015. He was first elected to Congress in a special election following the resignation of Michael Grimm. The district includes all of Staten Island, as well as portions of southwest Brooklyn. Donovan was defeated for reelection in 2018 by Democrat Max Rose.

== Early life and career ==
Donovan was born into a working-class Roman Catholic family in Staten Island, New York, in 1956. His Irish-American father, Daniel Michael Donovan, was a longshoreman and lifelong Democrat; his Polish-American mother, Katherine Bolewicz Donovan, was a garment worker.

He was raised in the Tompkinsville section of the borough. He attended Monsignor Farrell High School, an all-boys Catholic school, graduating in 1974. He went on to study criminal justice at St. John's University. After graduating from there he attended Fordham University School of Law, earning his juris doctor in 1988.

In 1989, Donovan became an Assistant District Attorney in the office of Robert M. Morgenthau. He served in the office of the New York County District Attorney under Morgenthau until 1996. Later that year Donovan became chief of staff to then Staten Island Borough President Guy V. Molinari. He remained in that position until 2002, when he was sworn in as Deputy Borough President of Staten Island; he had been appointed by his immediate predecessor and the then-new Borough President James Molinaro.

Donovan is Roman Catholic.

== Richmond County District Attorney ==
In 2003, 20-year incumbent Democrat William L. Murphy decided not to seek reelection. Donovan announced his intention to run to succeed him. In the election he faced Chief Assistant District Attorney David Lehr and won with over 53% of the vote. A key part of his platform was to start the county's first witness protection program; his office led the city's prosecutors with the highest felony conviction rate in many of the years since he took office.

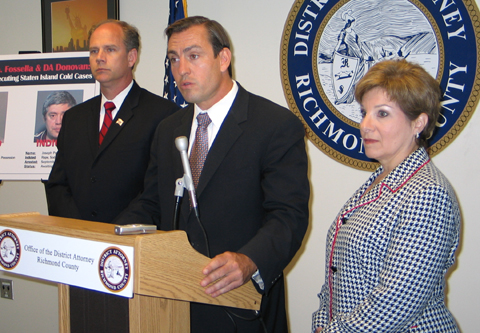
Donovan and Vito Fossella announce their support for federal legislation to prosecute cold cases, September 2005

Donovan was reelected in 2007 with over 68% of the vote, defeating local Democratic attorney Michael Ryan despite a last-minute endorsement of his rival by longtime friend and mentor Staten Island Borough President James Molinaro; Molinaro was angered that Donovan had referred his grandson's case to a special prosecutor.

Donovan's tenure as DA has seen several high-profile cases, including the second conviction of Andre Rand, long suspected in a string of kidnappings on Staten Island. In 2010, famed rapper Method Man pleaded guilty to attempted tax evasion and was forced to pay about $106,000 in restitution and penalties.

=== Eric Garner case ===
Donovan became the focus of a national controversy surrounding the death of Eric Garner in 2014, when a Richmond County, New York grand jury declined to indict Daniel Pantaleo, the officer whose chokehold the medical examiner determined was instrumental in Garner's death, on any charges. The medical examiner had ruled Garner's death a homicide. After considering the medical examiner's findings that Garner was killed by "compression of neck (choke hold), compression of chest and prone positioning during physical restraint by police", Donovan's office declared, "it is appropriate to present evidence regarding circumstances of his death to a Richmond County Grand Jury."

Donovan asked the grand jury to consider whether there was "probable cause" for manslaughter and criminally negligent homicide, but did not bring reckless endangerment charges. After two months, the grand jury returned no indictment. Donovan's office strenuously opposed releasing the trial proceedings, citing New York confidentiality laws, despite being pressured by activists and lawmakers to release them.

== 2010 New York Attorney General campaign ==
On May 17, 2010, Donovan, a registered Republican, announced his candidacy for the New York Attorney General, becoming the front-runner for his party's nomination. Bob Antonacci, Onondaga County Comptroller, also ran for the nomination.

Antonacci stepped aside and endorsed Donovan after earning 40% of the vote at the 2010 Republican State Convention. With 60% of the delegates at the convention and no primary opponent, Donovan became the presumptive nominee.

One week earlier, Donovan received the endorsement of the Conservative Party of New York, but he was defeated on November 2 by Democrat Eric Schneiderman.

== U.S. House of Representatives ==
=== Elections ===
==== 2015 special ====
Donovan was selected as the Republican candidate for New York's 11th congressional district after the resignation of Michael Grimm. He defeated Democratic City Councilman Vincent J. Gentile and Green Party candidate James Lane in the May 5, 2015 special election and was sworn into office on May 12, 2015.

==== 2016 ====
In 2016, Donovan faced Democrat Richard Reichard in his first reelection bid. He was reelected with 56.8% of the vote.

==== 2018 ====
In 2018, Grimm challenged Donovan in the Republican primary. During the campaign, Grimm accused Donovan of having tried to entice Grimm to drop out of the race by offering to lobby Trump to pardon Grimm. Grimm pleaded guilty to federal tax evasion charges in 2014 and spent several months in prison. Both candidates emphasized their loyalty to Trump, seeking to "out-Trump each other," according to the Washington Post. Donovan defeated Grimm, 64%-36%, but lost to Democrat Max Rose in the general election.

=== Committee assignments ===
- Committee on Foreign Affairs
  - Subcommittee on Africa, Global Health, Global Human Rights and International Organizations
  - Subcommittee on the Western Hemisphere
- Committee on Homeland Security
  - Subcommittee on Emergency Preparedness, Response, and Communications (Chairman)
  - Subcommittee on Cybersecurity, Infrastructure Protection, and Security Technologies

Donovan is a member of the moderate Republican Main Street Partnership, the Congressional NextGen 9-1-1 Caucus and the Climate Solutions Caucus.

=== Town halls ===
Donovan has faced a number of protests from constituents seeking town hall meetings. After being heckled at public events, he has instead held telephone phone halls over "fears that any large-scale town hall will devolve into mayhem."

Constituents have organized a variety of town halls to which Donovan has been invited. He has not attended, saying that to avoid disruptions, he only holds town halls over the phone.

=== Political positions ===
As of January 2018, Donovan had voted with his party in 91.6% of votes in the 115th United States Congress and voted in line with President Trump's position in 81.4% of votes. He was ranked as the 15th most bipartisan member of the U.S. House of Representatives during the 114th United States Congress in the Bipartisan Index created by The Lugar Center and the McCourt School of Public Policy.

Donovan has been characterized as a "moderate Republican". In his 2018 primary election, he ran with an emphasis on conservatism and loyalty to Trump. In the first session of the 115th United States Congress, Donovan's Bipartisan Index rank fell to 50th.

==== Vote Smart Political Courage Test ====
Vote Smart, a nonprofit, nonpartisan research organization that collects and distributes information on candidates for public office in the United States, "researched presidential and congressional candidates' public records to determine candidates' likely responses on certain key issues." According to Vote Smart's 2016 analysis, Donovan generally supports pro-choice legislation, opposes federal spending and supports lowering taxes as a means of promoting economic growth, supports the building of the Keystone Pipeline, opposes government funding for the development of renewable energy, opposes the federal regulation of greenhouse gas emissions, supports gun-control legislation, opposes repealing the Affordable Care Act, supports requiring immigrants who are unlawfully present to return to their country of origin before they are eligible for citizenship, opposes same-sex marriage, supports increased American intervention in Iraq and Syria beyond air support, and opposes allowing individuals to divert a portion of their Social Security taxes into personal retirement accounts.

==== Donald Trump ====
Donovan endorsed Trump in the 2016 presidential election. He has called Trump a "personal friend". Trump endorsed Donovan's 2018 reelection bid, but in the announcement of his endorsement mistakenly claimed that Donovan had voted for the Tax Cuts and Jobs Act of 2017. Donovan introduced legislation that would require post offices to display Trump's portrait.

==== Health care ====
In January 2016, Donovan voted to repeal the Affordable Care Act (Obamacare). In May 2017, he voted against the American Health Care Act (the GOP's bill repealing Obamacare).

==== Immigration ====
New York City's sole Republican member of Congress, Donovan supported Trump's 2017 executive order to impose a ban on immigration from seven Muslim-majority countries. He said, "President Trump's decision is in America's best interest, and I support exploring safe zones in the region to protect innocent life." Protesters disrupted a Brooklyn Chamber of Commerce event in February 2017, repeatedly shouting down Donovan due to his support of Trump's immigration ban.

In June 2017, Donovan voted in favor of Kate's Law, which would increase penalties for undocumented immigrants who return to the United States after being deported.

Donovan opposes sanctuary cities (jurisdictions that have policies in place to limit cooperation with federal immigration enforcement). In March 2017, Donovan said that he opposed efforts to reduce funding for jurisdictions with sanctuary policies in place. In April 2018, he introduced legislation that would reduce federal funding to jurisdictions with sanctuary policies in place, such as New York City. In June 2018, Donovan defended ICE's decision to arrest an undocumented immigrant who was delivering a pizza to a Brooklyn Army base. During his 2018 primary campaign, Donovan came out in favor of Trump's wall on the Mexican border, saying, "Build that wall! Build that damn wall!"

==== Cybersecurity ====
In September 2018, Donovan co-sponsored, together with Elise Stefanik and Seth Moulton, the "Cyber Ready Workforce Act" advanced by Jacky Rosen. The legislation would create a grant program within the Department of Labor to "create, implement and expand registered apprenticeships" in cybersecurity. It aims to offer certifications and connect participants with businesses in order to "boost the number" of federal jobs in said trade.

==== LGBT rights ====
Donovan was endorsed by the Log Cabin Republicans in 2010. He has been criticized by the Democratic Party for his opposition to same-sex marriage. Donovan has a 64% rating from the Human Rights Campaign based on his LGBT rights voting record.

==== Marijuana ====
Donovan has a "C" rating from NORML regarding his voting record on cannabis-related matters. He has voted against allowing veterans access to medical marijuana, if legal in their state, per their Veterans Health Administration doctor's recommendation.

==== Taxes ====
Donovan voted against the Tax Cuts and Jobs Act of 2017, one of five New York Republican representatives to do so. He said he opposed the bill because it would raise taxes for his constituents and exacerbate the "already unaffordable housing market in my district". With the House Ways and Means Committee scheduled to consider legislation in September 2018 that would make permanent individual tax changes in Trump's 2017 tax law, Donovan said he would be "forced to oppose" legislation that included a provision "permanently extending the $10,000 cap on the state and local tax (SALT) deduction".

==== Unmasking Antifa Act of 2018 ====
In 2018, Donovan introduced a bill that would penalize anyone who causes "injury, opposes, threatens or intimidates any person" while wearing a mask, with the maximum penalty a 15-year sentence. The legislation, which made reference to the far-left group Antifa, was given media attention after being promoted by alt-right activist Mike Cernovich. Professor Mark Bray of Dartmouth said, "It's a law that threatens to clamp down on direct action politics. More broadly, I think it sets a disturbing precedent."

Legal offices
Preceded by William L. Murphy	District Attorney of Richmond County; 2004–2015	Succeeded by Daniel Master; Acting
Party political offices
Preceded by Jeanine Pirro	Republican nominee for Attorney General of New York; 2010	Succeeded by John Cahill
U.S. House of Representatives
Preceded by Michael Grimm	Member of the U.S. House of Representatives from New York's 11th congressional district 2015–2019	Succeeded by Max Rose
U.S. order of precedence (ceremonial)
Preceded by Michael Grimm as Former U.S. Representative	Order of precedence of the United States as Former U.S. Representative	Succeeded by Jamaal Bowman as Former U.S. Representative
