= Reformed Church on Staten Island =

- U.S. National Register of Historic Places
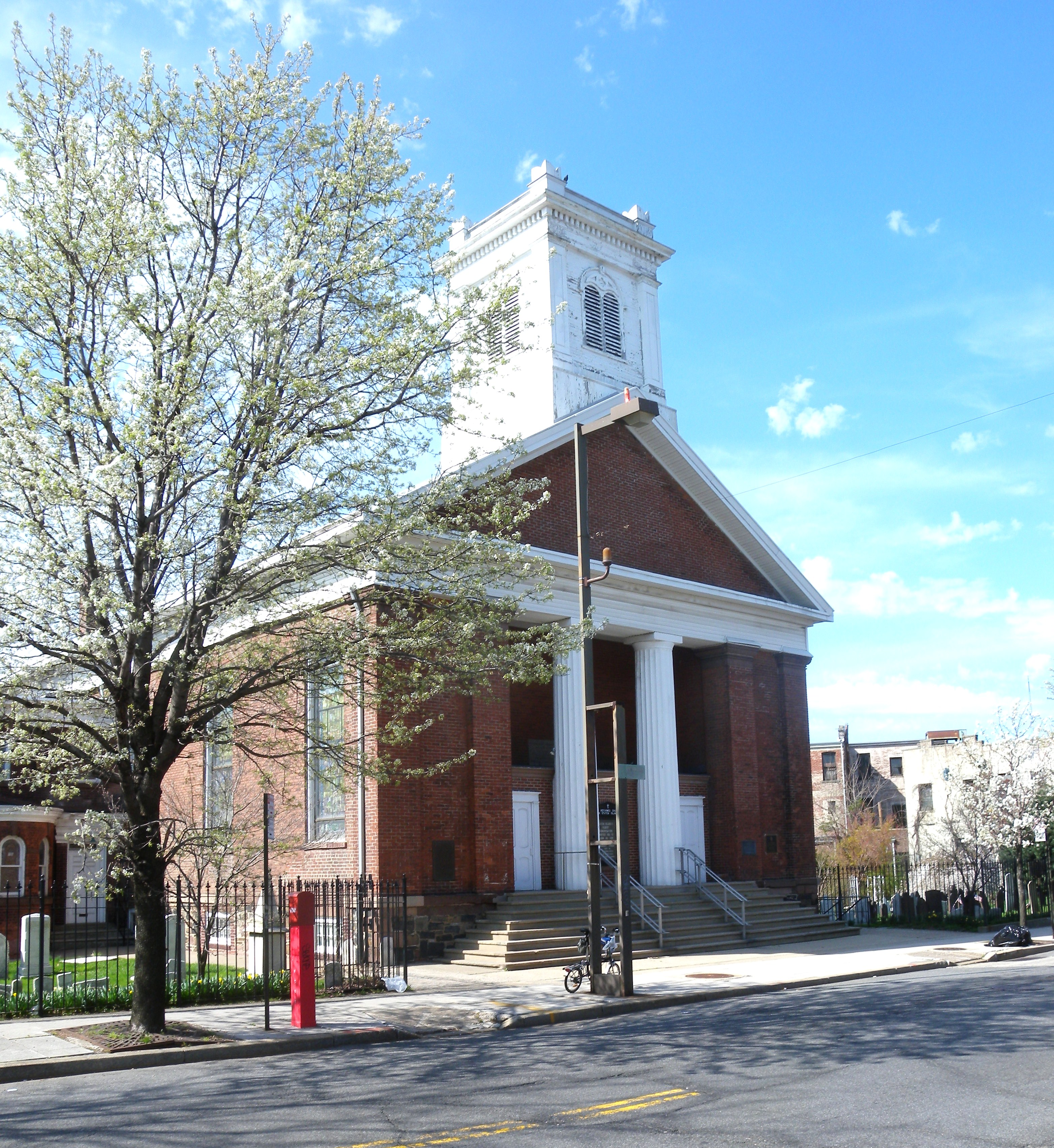
- Reformed Church on Staten Island, April 2010

- Location within New York City Location within New York Location within the United States
- Location: 54 Port Richmond Ave., Staten Island, New York
- Coordinates: 40°38′23″N 74°7′57″W
- Area: 1.3 acres (0.53 ha)
- Built: 1844
- Architect: multiple
- Architectural style: Greek Revival, Renaissance
- NRHP reference No.: 04001533
- Added to NRHP: January 20, 2005

The Reformed Church on Staten Island is a historic Dutch Reformed Church and cemetery at 54 Port Richmond Avenue in Port Richmond, Staten Island, New York.

The Reformed Church was founded in 1660 and has been at the same site since 1680. The first church was built shortly thereafter. The second church, built in 1717, was destroyed by the British during the American Revolutionary War. The third church was built in 1787. The current church was built in 1844 in the Greek Revival style. It is a brick building set on a fieldstone foundation. The front façade features a portico with twin sets of flanking brick pilasters and a central pair of fluted Doric order columns. The Rev. Cornelis Van Santvoort (1686-1752) served as Domini from 1718 to 1740.

It was added to the National Register of Historic Places in 2005.
