= Hubbard R. Yetman =

American educator and real estate agent (1847–1924)

Hubbard Rively Yetman (August 28, 1847 – October 18, 1924) was an American educator, real estate and insurance agent, and politician from New York.

== Life ==
Yetman was born on August 28, 1847, in Englishtown, New Jersey, the son of William Arthur Yetman and Mary Amy Rively. He attended school at Monmouth Hall in Freehold.

When Yetman was barely 15, he enlisted in the 14th New Jersey Volunteer Infantry to fight in the Civil War. He served as a drummer for a while, and then was appointed adjutant's clerk. The 14th was in the Army of the Potomac, and Yetman was in all the engagements. He was wounded once, but stayed with the 14th until it mustered out of service at the end of the War.

After the War, he moved to Tottenville, Staten Island, New York. He taught public school there for 15 years, was elected justice of the peace for several terms, and represented insurance companies.

In 1888, Yetman was elected to the New York State Assembly as a Democrat, representing Richmond County. He served in the Assembly in 1889, 1892, and 1893.

Yetman was elected School Commissioner in 1893, but declined the position due to a contest for the office. He was elected as the last town supervisor for Westfield in 1897. After the consolidation of New York City, he was made the Superintendent of Schools for the Borough of Richmond. He resigned from the position in 1902.

Yetman married Sarah Virginia Joline in 1870. Their children were Laura Blatchford, Arthur Hubbard, Grace Hazleton, and William Joline. He was the Commander of Lenhart Post No. 163, Grand Army of the Republic.

Yetman died at home on October 18, 1924. He was buried in Bethel Cemetery.

New York State Assembly
Preceded by George Cromwell	New York State Assembly; Richmond County; 1889	Succeeded by Daniel T. Cornell
Preceded by John Croak	New York State Assembly; Richmond County; 1892-1893	Succeeded by Michael McGuire
