= 2015 New York's 11th congressional district special election =

- May 5, 2015

New York's 11th congressional district
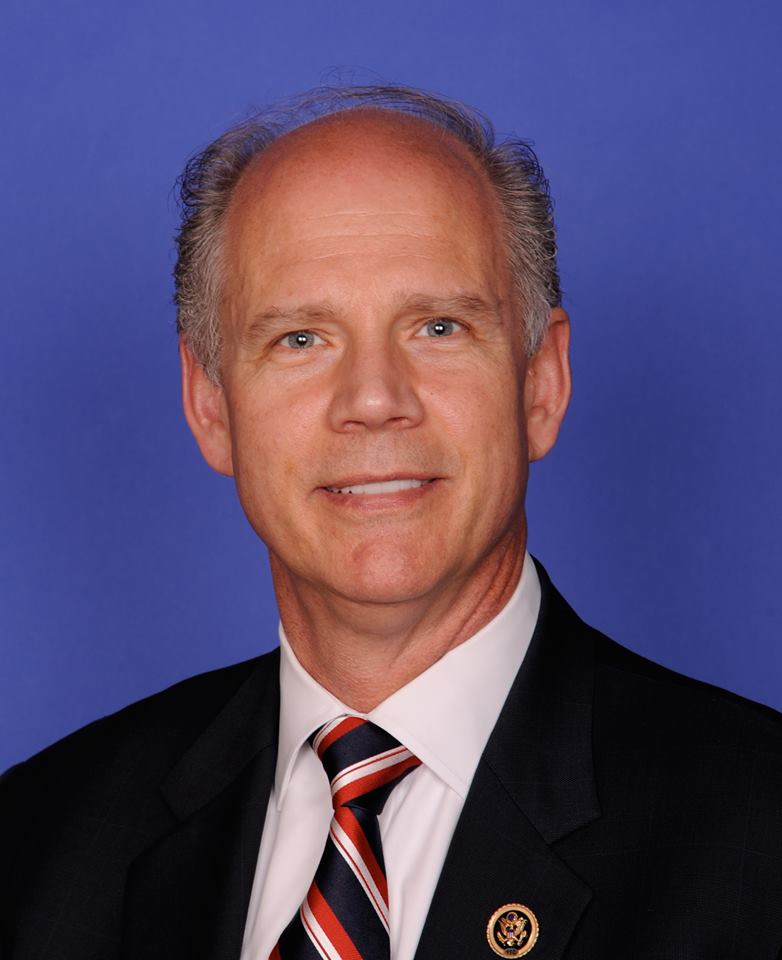

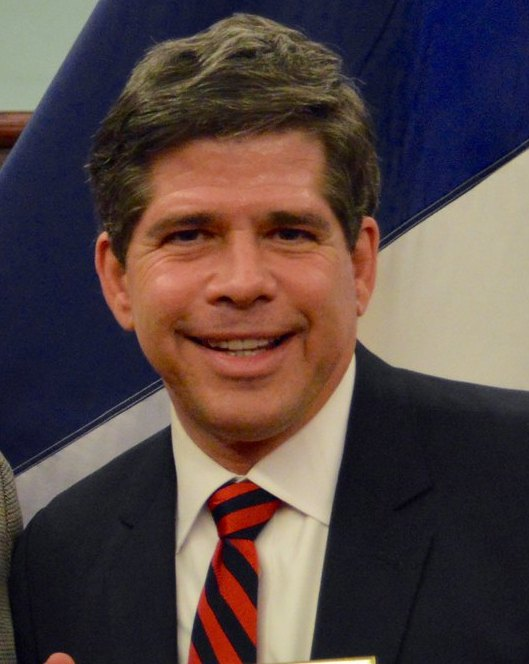
Nominee	Dan Donovan	Vincent J. Gentile
Party	Republican	Democratic
Alliance	Conservative / Independence	Working Families
Popular vote	24,797	17,049
Percentage	58.3%	40.1%
- Results by state assembly district Donovan: 50–60% 60–70% 70–80% 80–90% Gentile: 50–60% 60–70% 70–80%
U.S. Representative before election
Michael Grimm
Republican
Elected U.S. Representative
Dan Donovan
Republican

A special election for New York's 11th congressional district was held on May 5, 2015, to fill the vacancy created by the resignation of Michael Grimm. Grimm, a member of the Republican Party, announced on December 30, 2014, that he would resign from the House effective January 5, 2015, and not take his seat for a third term following his guilty plea for tax evasion. On May 5, 2015, Republican candidate Dan Donovan defeated his Democratic challenger Vincent Gentile in the election and filled the vacant seat.

== Background ==
In April 2014, Grimm was indicted on twenty felony charges, including mail and wire fraud, perjury, obstruction of justice, employing illegal immigrants, and conspiring to defraud the United States after it was found that he under-reported revenues and employee wages relating to a restaurant he owned. He surrendered to the police and was released on $400,000 bail. Vowing his innocence, Grimm continued his campaign for reelection, and defeated Domenic Recchia, the Democratic Party nominee, by 53%, Grimm's highest margin in his congressional career.

On December 23, 2014, Grimm pleaded guilty to one charge of felony tax evasion. All other charges were dropped as part of the plea bargain. Grimm indicated that he would not resign his seat. However, on December 30, Grimm announced that he would resign from Congress on January 5, 2015, rather than be sworn in for his elected term. According to the U.S. Constitution (I.2.iv), Governor Andrew Cuomo is legally required to call a special election to fill the seat, which under the terms of the New York Constitution is to be held within 70 to 80 days of his announcement. On February 2, Cuomo, who had given no indication of when he would call the special election for, said that he was "looking at it now" but didn't have a timeframe for setting a date. Staten Island Attorney Ronald Castorina Jr. filed a lawsuit on behalf of 8 Plaintiffs from Brooklyn and Staten Island, Republicans, Democrats, Independents, and Non-Enrolled parties, to force Cuomo to call a special election and on February 17, Judge Jack B. Weinstein of the United States District Court for the Eastern District of New York ordered Cuomo to either schedule the election or explain why he was delaying, or he would schedule the election himself. Cuomo's office replied that he would "announce the date" for the special election "shortly". On February 20, Cuomo announced that the election would be held on May 5.

As it was a special election, primary elections did not occur. The nominees were selected by local party leaders in Brooklyn and Staten Island .

== Republican Party ==
=== Candidates ===
==== Nominee ====
- Dan Donovan, Staten Island District Attorney and nominee for New York Attorney General in 2010

==== Declined ====
- Vito Fossella, former U.S. Representative
- Nicole Malliotakis, state assemblywoman

=== Endorsements ===
Dan Donovan

State legislators

- Nicole Malliotakis, state assemblymember (2011–2021)

Party chapters

- Staten Island Republican Party
Nicole Malliotakis (declined)

Statewide officials

- George Pataki, former governor of New York (1995–2006)

== Democratic Party ==
=== Candidates ===
==== Nominated ====
- Vincent J. Gentile, New York City Councilman

==== Withdrawn ====
- Amber Adler, community advocate
- Lorie Honor, businesswoman
- Arne Mattsson, nominee for the 13th congressional district in 2002
- Carlo Scissura, president of the Brooklyn Chamber of Commerce
- John Sollazzo, vice chairman of the Staten Island Democratic Committee
- William Colton, state assemblyman
- Robert Holst, electrician

==== Declined ====
- Michael Cusick, state assemblyman
- Michael McMahon, former U.S. Representative

== Third parties ==
Besides the Democratic and Republican parties, the Conservative, Green, Independence, Reform, Women's Equality and Working Families parties are qualified New York parties. Under the terms of electoral fusion, a candidate may be nominated by multiple parties.

=== Conservative ===
==== Nominee ====
- Dan Donovan, Staten Island District Attorney and Republican nominee for New York Attorney General in 2010

==== Declined ====
- Nicole Malliotakis, state assemblywoman
- James Molinaro, former Staten Island Borough President

=== Green ===
==== Nominee ====
- James Lane, internet media professional and nominee for New York City Public Advocate in 2013

=== Independence ===
==== Nominee ====
- Dan Donovan, Staten Island District Attorney and Republican nominee for New York Attorney General in 2010

==== Publicly expressed interest ====
- Robert McKenna, retired New York City Police Lieutenant

==== Declined ====
- Nicole Malliotakis, state assemblywoman

=== Working Families ===
==== Nominee ====
- Vincent J. Gentile, New York City Councilman

== General election ==
=== Polling ===
Hypothetical polling

Poll source	Date(s) administered	Sample size	Margin of error	Dan Donovan (R)	Michael Cusick (D)	Other	Undecided
Global Strategy Group*	January 16–18, 2015	404	± 4.9%	48%	28%	—	24%

- * Poll commissioned by the Democratic Congressional Campaign Committee

=== Fundraising ===
Campaign Finance Reports through April 15
Candidate	Raised	Spent	Cash on Hand	Debt
Vincent Gentile	$195,724	$79,697	$116,026	$0
Dan Donovan	$614,775	$152,533	$461,781	$120,760
James Lane	$11,095	$3,567	$7,527	$0
Source: OpenSecrets

=== Predictions ===
Source	Ranking	As of
The Cook Political Report	Solid R	April 3, 2015
Inside Elections	Solid R	January 28, 2015
Sabato's Crystal Ball	Likely R	January 5, 2015

=== Endorsements ===
Vincent Gentile

Statewide officials

- Andrew Cuomo, governor of New York (2011–2021)

=== Results ===
New York's 11th congressional district special election, 2015
Party	Candidate	Votes	%
Republican	Dan Donovan	19,065	44.85%
Conservative	Dan Donovan	4,289	10.09%
Independence	Dan Donovan	1,443	3.39%
Total	Dan Donovan	24,797	58.33%
Democratic	Vincent Gentile	15,595	36.69%
Working Families	Vincent Gentile	1,454	3.42%
Total	Vincent Gentile	17,049	40.11%
Green	James Lane	567	1.33%
Write-in	Write-in	96	0.23%
Total votes		42,509	100.0%
Republican hold			

==== Results by county ====
Vote breakdown by county
	Dan Donovan Republican		Vincent Gentile Democrat		James Lane Green		Write-in Write-in		Total
County	Votes	%	Votes	%	Votes	%	Votes	%	Votes
Kings (part)	3,570	37.74%	5,745	60.73%	130	1.37%	15	0.16%	9,460
Richmond	21,227	64.23%	11,304	34.20%	437	1.32%	81	0.25%	33,049

== See also ==
- List of special elections to the United States House of Representatives
