= Michael Grimm (politician) =

American politician (born 1970)

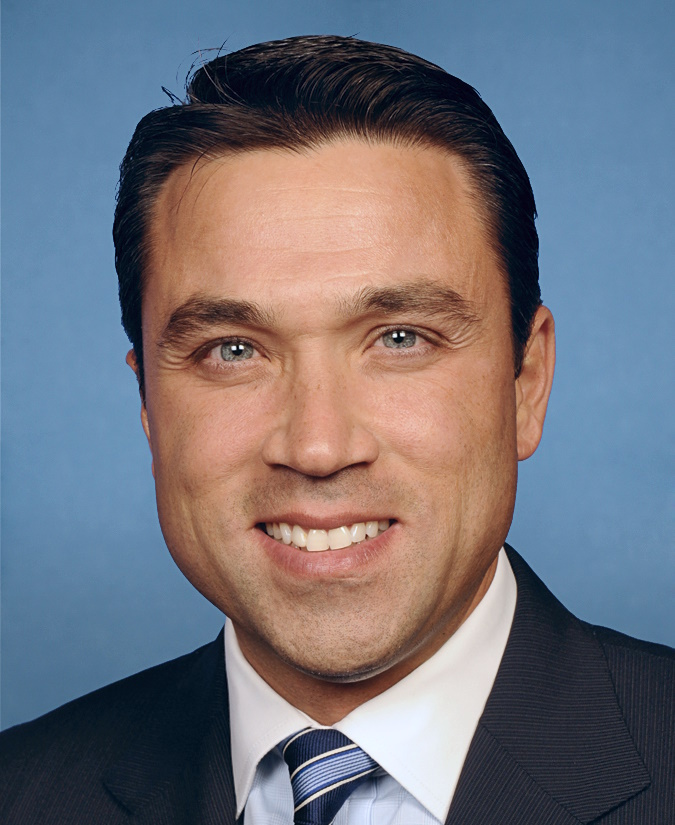
- Grimm in 2011.

Member of the U.S. House of Representatives from New York
- In office January 3, 2011 – January 5, 2015
- Preceded by: Michael McMahon
- Succeeded by: Dan Donovan
- Constituency: 13th district (2011–2013); 11th district (2013–2015)

Personal details
- Born: Michael Gerard Grimm; February 7, 1970 (age 56) New York City, New York, U.S.
- Party: Republican
- Education: Baruch College (BBA); New York Law School (JD)

Military service
- Branch/service: United States Marine Corps
- Years of service: 1989–1997
- Rank: Corporal
- Unit: U.S. Marine Corps Reserve
- Battles/wars: Gulf War • Operation Desert Shield • Operation Desert Storm
- Awards: Combat Action Ribbon; Navy Unit Commendation; Meritorious Unit Commendation

Michael Gerard Grimm (born February 7, 1970) is an American politician and convicted felon who served as the U.S. representative for New York's 13th congressional district from 2011 to 2013, and represented New York's 11th congressional district from 2013 until his resignation in 2015 due to felony tax fraud charges. Both districts consisted of Staten Island and parts of Brooklyn. Grimm is a Republican.

On April 28, 2014, Grimm was charged by federal authorities with 20 counts of fraud, federal tax evasion, and perjury. On December 23, 2014, he pleaded guilty to a single count of felony tax fraud and "acknowledged committing perjury, hiring illegal immigrants, and committing wire fraud". He resigned from Congress effective January 5, 2015 and was later sentenced to eight months in prison.

Grimm ran for Congress again in 2018, but lost in the Republican primary. He later worked as a political commentator for Newsmax. In 2024, he was in a horseback-riding accident that left him paralyzed. Grimm was pardoned by President Donald Trump on May 28, 2025.

== Early life and education ==
Grimm was raised as a Catholic in Queens, New York, the son of Petrina (née Castronova) and Gerard Grimm. He is of German, Irish, and Sicilian descent. He graduated from Archbishop Molloy High School in 1988.

Grimm entered active duty with the U.S. Marine Corps in 1989. He received a combat promotion to corporal, and was awarded the Combat Action Ribbon, Navy Unit Commendation, the Meritorious Unit Commendation, among other awards. He later transferred to the U.S. Marine Corps Reserve and was discharged from service in 1997.

Grimm received a BBA in accounting from Baruch College in 1994. He received a Juris Doctor (magna cum laude) from New York Law School in 2002.

== Career ==
=== Federal Bureau of Investigation (1991–2006) ===
Grimm entered the FBI as a clerk in 1991. In 1995, he entered the FBI Academy in Quantico Station, Virginia. He graduated as a special agent and was certified to become an undercover agent. He transitioned into undercover agent work, eventually working in the FBI Gambino Squad, and was assigned to the inside activities of Peter Gotti, John Gotti's brother. Grimm worked for the FBI as an agent for nine years.

In 2011, Evan Ratliff, writing for The New Yorker, reported that Grimm had been the subject of an internal investigation into allegations that he abused his authority as an FBI agent in a nightclub in 1999. At the time of the New Yorker report, the New York City Police Department and U.S. Justice Department had not released documents regarding the alleged incident. Grimm stated that the incident had been fully investigated and that he had been cleared of all allegations.

During his time with the FBI, Grimm spent two years posing as a small-cap stockbroker, uncovering white-collar criminals on Wall Street. According to Grimm, the firm was involved in money laundering, making false trades, and manipulating stocks. After building a strong case for two years, he and the firm's partners were arrested together, at which point the police informed the group that they had been infiltrated by an undercover agent. Grimm stated in 2011 that he has long been aware of the possibility that people may try to take revenge on him. He left the FBI in 2006, citing his exhaustion from working long hours.

=== Business and finance (2006–2010) ===
Before joining the FBI, Grimm worked for a year for Whale Securities, an investment banking firm. Shortly before leaving the bureau, Grimm invested in a luxury Texas development.

In 2006, Grimm founded a small health food restaurant in Manhattan called Healthalicious. He co-owned and served as principal and chief executive officer of Austin Refuel Transport, an Austin, Texas-based bio-fuel company. As of 2011, Grimm owned 28% of the company, although he is no longer involved in daily operations nor is he CEO. In July 2011, the New York Daily News reported that Austin Refuel Transport had received 11 safety violations in two U.S. Department of Transportation checkups. Grimm's spokesman said that he now "has no authority or managerial role in the daily activities of the company. He is simply a silent investor."

=== U.S. House of Representatives (2011–2015) ===
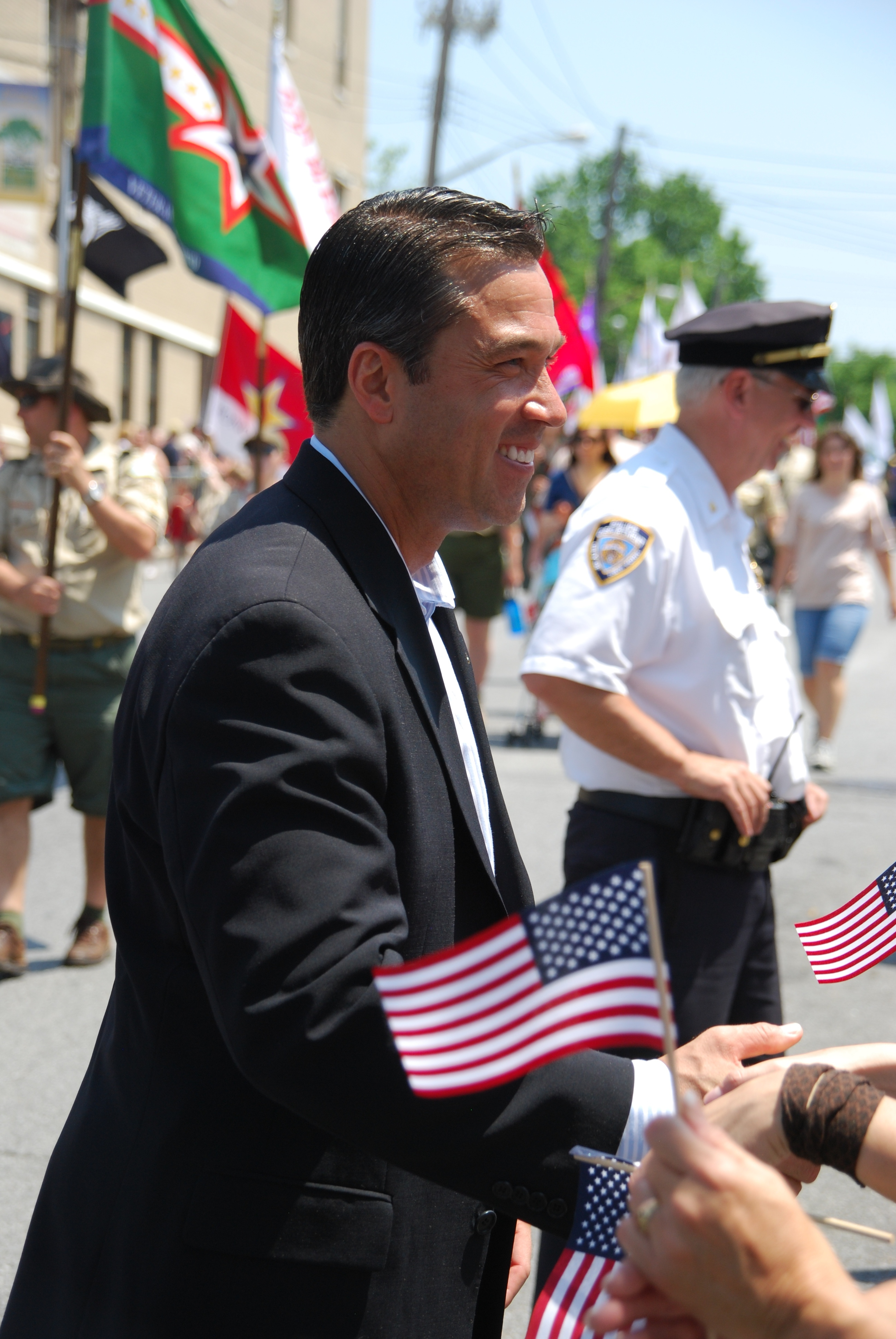
Grimm greets spectators on Memorial Day

==== Elections ====
===== 2010 =====
Grimm launched his campaign for the 13th New York Congressional District seat on January 23, 2010. He was endorsed by former NYC mayor Rudy Giuliani as well as Guy Molinari, a former U.S. Representative and Staten Island Borough President. He was also endorsed by the Conservative Party of New York State. He was challenged by Michael Allegretti who was endorsed by former six-term U.S. Representative Vito Fossella, the Staten Island Republican Party, State Senator Andrew Lanza, and State Assemblyman Lou Tobacco. Allegretti worked for the nonprofit Climate Group and cited his relationships with NYC Mayor Michael R. Bloomberg and former British Prime Minister Tony Blair. Grimm chose not to contest the Staten Island's party endorsement because of their "corrupt political culture" and "sham convention."

Grimm's primary win was divisive for the Republican Party leadership, which favored Allegretti. His campaign gained national attention from the Tea Party and the National Republican Congressional Committee, which contributed $90,000 to Grimm's campaign. He received endorsements from high-profile Republicans, including Giuliani, John McCain, Sarah Palin, and former president George H. W. Bush, who applauded his service in the Gulf War.

Grimm faced incumbent Michael McMahon in the general election. On October 12, the Staten Island Advance reported that it had been receiving emails from the McMahon campaign attacking Grimm's business credentials. Grimm reportedly admitted in an interview with the Staten Island Advance that his former restaurant in Manhattan, Healthalicious, had been on the verge of bankruptcy, forcing him to sell his stake in it. A major difference between the two candidates was the issue of the U.S. economic stimulus package, which the Advance called the "starkest contrast" among the two candidates. Grimm stated that the stimulus was a "huge waste" of taxpayer money and ineffective in generating job creation and economic recovery, whereas McMahon cited improvements in the state budget and renovations on the Staten Island Expressway and the Saint George Ferry Terminal as direct successes of the stimulus.

On November 2, 2010, Grimm defeated McMahon in the race, 51% to 48%. The Advance reported that Grimm won in large part due to his political signs, which became popular among his supporters. They stated, "McMahon raised my property taxes 18.5%".

===== 2012 =====
After redistricting, Grimm's district was renumbered the 11th District. He was challenged by Democrat Mark Murphy, a former aide to New York City Public Advocate Bill de Blasio. Grimm won reelection to a second term, 53%–46%.

===== 2014 =====
In 2014 Grimm received the backing of the Staten Island Republican party and the Independence Party, who called him "'a truly independent voice' for his constituents." He faced Democratic Party nominee Domenic Recchia in the general election. Grimm was endorsed by the Association of Flight Attendants-CWA, the International Union of Painters and Allied Trades, the United Transportation Union, and the Humane Society Legislative Fund. Grimm defeated Recchia on election night, November 5, 2014.

===== 2018 =====
On October 1, 2017, Grimm launched a campaign for reelection to his old House seat in New York's 11th District. On May 30, 2018, President Donald Trump endorsed incumbent Representative Dan Donovan. Donovan defeated Grimm in the June 26 Republican primary, 63.9% to 36.1%.

==== Tenure ====
During a Sean Hannity interview of all freshmen Republican members, Representative-Elect Grimm took exception to being asked if he was a conservative. He replied that he was "American first" and that "we have become way too polarized," indicating a desire for compromise with Democrats. Grimm did not join the Tea Party Caucus in the House, instead joining the more moderate Republican Main Street Partnership.

===== Fiscal issues =====
Grimm was appointed to the House Financial Services Committee, which the Staten Island Advance considered a major opportunity for Grimm to influence the debate on financial reform. Roughly 70,000 of his constituents were involved in financial services, making this a vital issue for his political profile.

Grimm introduced legislation that would prohibit potential whistle-blowers from receiving a cash reward from the Securities and Exchange Commission unless they report wrongdoing to their employers before reporting it to the SEC.

Grimm voted for the fiscal cliff compromise bill that permanently extended most of the Bush tax cuts.

===== Gun control =====
After the 2011 Tucson shooting, Grimm voiced support for "security-based situational awareness training", including how to spot suspicious people, when to run for an exit, and how to keep guards at close range. Grimm also said congressmen should consider carrying firearms. House Leader John Boehner called his suggestions an "excellent idea" and indicated that security would be a major focus for Congress in 2011.

===== Abortion =====
Grimm voted in favor of the Pain-Capable Unborn Child Protection Act, a bill banning abortions after the 20th week of fertilization.

===== Healthcare =====
Grimm voted to repeal the Patient Protection and Affordable Care Act in the House, as he had promised during his campaign. He was called "hypocritical" by several Democrats for enrolling in the congressional health-care plan.

===== Immigration =====
Grimm has expressed support for immigration reform and was one of six Republicans to vote against an amendment that would have resumed deportation of "Dreamers".

===== Israel =====
Grimm was appointed to the House Republican Israel Caucus in January 2011, serving as co-chair. In February 2011, as House Republicans were pushing for deep cuts in discretionary spending, Grimm wrote a letter to Eric Cantor saying he would vote against any budget that reduced aid to Israel. Grimm was also named chair of the House Republican Policy Committee's Task Force on Foreign Policy.

===== Syria =====
Grimm opposed a military strike on the Assad regime in Syria, stating, "I am no longer convinced that a U.S. strike on Syria will yield a benefit to the United States that will not be greatly outweighed by the extreme cost of war."

===== Fundraising allegations by Rabbi Pinto =====
According to a January 27, 2012, New York Times article, several followers of Orthodox Rabbi Yoshiyahu Yosef Pinto said Grimm's campaign had accepted questionable donations. Three of Pinto's followers reportedly said that Grimm or Ofer Biton, a top aide of Pinto's, had told them that the campaign would find a way to accept donations that were over the legal limit. Grimm stated, "Any suggestion that I was involved in any activities that may run afoul of the campaign finance laws is categorically false and belied by my life of public service protecting and enforcing the laws of this country."

===== Hurricane Sandy aid =====
In June 2013, Grimm stated that he believed water fees should be waived for survivors of Hurricane Sandy who had been displaced from their homes. Under New York City's Department of Environmental Protection rules, all homeowners are subject to a minimum charge of $1.19 per day, even if a home uses no water during a given period. Residents who had been displaced from their homes for long periods of time received water bills over $500 for damaged, vacant properties. Grimm called the bills "ridiculous," saying, "That's $500 these people could use to replace a washer or dryer or refrigerator swept out to sea during Sandy."

===== Threat against reporter =====
On January 28, 2014, NY1-TV political reporter Michael Scotto was interviewing Grimm in a balcony hallway of the U.S. Capitol building about the recently concluded 2014 State of the Union Address. He then tried to question Grimm about a campaign finance investigation. Grimm said he would not discuss the investigation. As Scotto started to mention the investigation again, Grimm walked off. Scotto then turned to the camera and implied that Grimm did not want to face the issue on camera. Grimm then threatened Scotto, saying that he would "break [Scotto] in half". He also threatened to throw Scotto over the balcony.

Grimm issued a statement defending his behavior, saying that he was annoyed by what he called a "disrespectful cheap shot" from Scotto. The next day, Grimm contacted Scotto to offer an apology for his behavior, which Scotto deemed sincere. Grimm also issued a written apology, saying, "I shouldn't have allowed my emotions to get the better of me and lose my cool." An unnamed former staffer for Grimm and NY1-TV political director Bob Hardt reported that Grimm had behaved in a similar manner to other reporters on previous occasions.

===== Flood insurance reform =====
In early 2014, Grimm and Bill Cassidy cosponsored the Homeowner Flood Insurance Affordability Act. In March 2014, the bill was passed by the U.S. Senate and signed into law by President Obama. The law repealed and capped "skyrocketing" flood insurance premiums for 5.5 million Americans in flood-prone areas.

===== Environmental views =====
According to Politico, in April 2014, Grimm became "the first sitting House Republican to stop denying the science that humans cause climate change." Grimm stated, "The majority of respected scientists say that it's conclusive, the evidence is clear. So I don't think the jury is out."

==== Committee assignments ====
- Committee on Financial Services
  - Subcommittee on Capital Markets and Government-Sponsored Enterprises
  - Subcommittee on Monetary Policy and Trade
  - Subcommittee on Oversight and Investigations

==== Caucus memberships ====
- Congressional Gaming Caucus
- Friends of Switzerland Caucus (Co-chair)
- House Republican Israel Caucus (Co-chair)
- House Oceans Caucus (Co-chair)
- International Conservation Caucus
- Sportsmen's Caucus

== Federal criminal investigation and conviction ==
In August 2012, the office of the United States Attorney for the Eastern District of New York said it was investigating Grimm's 2010 campaign. In November 2012, the House Ethics Committee decided to inquire into the campaign but agreed to "defer consideration" of it at the Department of Justice's request.

On January 10, 2014, the FBI arrested Grimm's former girlfriend Diana Durand on charges that she had illegally donated more than $10,000 to Grimm's 2010 campaign. Durand allegedly gave the campaign $4,800, the legal limit, but then used straw donors to donate more than $10,000 illegally. The FBI also charged Durand with lying to federal agents about the matter. Grimm denied any wrongdoing. In September 2014, Durand pled guilty to making illegal contributions to Grimm's 2010 campaign.

The investigation, which originally focused on Grimm's 2010 fundraising, branched out to include Grimm's prior business dealings. On April 25, 2014, Grimm's attorney was advised by the U.S. Attorney's office that his client would be indicted on criminal charges related to Healthalicious. On April 28, prosecutors unsealed a 20-count indictment charging that Grimm and others concealed over $1 million of the restaurant's sales and wages from both the U.S. federal government and the State of New York. Grimm surrendered to the FBI that morning. Grimm pled not guilty to all charges and was released on $400,000 bond. He told reporters that he not only had every intention of fighting the charges, but also of staying in office and running for a third term.

On December 23, 2014, less than two months after winning reelection, Grimm pled guilty to one charge of felony tax evasion. He admitted to under-reporting Healthalicious's revenues by more than $900,000 over four years and to filing false tax returns based on that under-reported income. He also admitted to using the under-reported receipts to pay restaurant expenses, as well as to make under-the-table cash payments to employees. As part of the plea bargain, the other charges were dropped, but Grimm admitted to two of the offenses in the original indictment: knowingly employing people ineligible to work in the United States and lying in a 2013 deposition. The crimes to which he pled guilty carried a prison sentence of up to 30 months.

At first Grimm admitted making mistakes, but told a reporter he would "absolutely not" resign. On December 29, 2014, it was reported that after discussing the matter with House Speaker John Boehner, Grimm had changed his mind and would decline to take his seat for a third term. He resigned from Congress on January 5, 2015. A special election to replace him was held on May 5, 2015, and Staten Island District Attorney Daniel Donovan, a Republican, was elected to the seat.

On July 17, 2015, U.S. District Judge Pamela K. Chen suggested that Grimm's moral compass "needs some reorientation" and sentenced him to eight months in prison. He surrendered on September 22, 2015, after a brief delay for medical treatment. He was released on May 20, 2016, after serving seven months. On May 28, 2025, Donald Trump signed a full pardon for Grimm.

== Personal life ==
Prior to his indictment, Grimm lived on Staten Island. He is divorced with no children.

On September 22, 2024, Grimm became paralyzed from the chest down from a neck injury after being thrown off his horse during a game of polo. A Gofundme asking for $2.5 million to cover his medical expenses was made in the aftermath, and by December 26, it raised $729,000.

== See also ==
- List of American federal politicians convicted of crimes
- List of federal political scandals in the United States
- List of people granted executive clemency in the second Trump presidency

U.S. House of Representatives
Preceded by Michael McMahon	Member of the U.S. House of Representatives from New York's 13th congressional district 2011–2013	Succeeded by Charles Rangel
Preceded by Yvette Clarke	Member of the U.S. House of Representatives from New York's 11th congressional district 2013–2015	Succeeded by Dan Donovan
U.S. order of precedence (ceremonial)
Preceded by Dan Maffei as Former U.S. Representative	Order of precedence of the United States as Former U.S. Representative	Succeeded by Dan Donovan as Former U.S. Representative
