= Temple Emanu-El (Staten Island) =

Synagogue in New York City

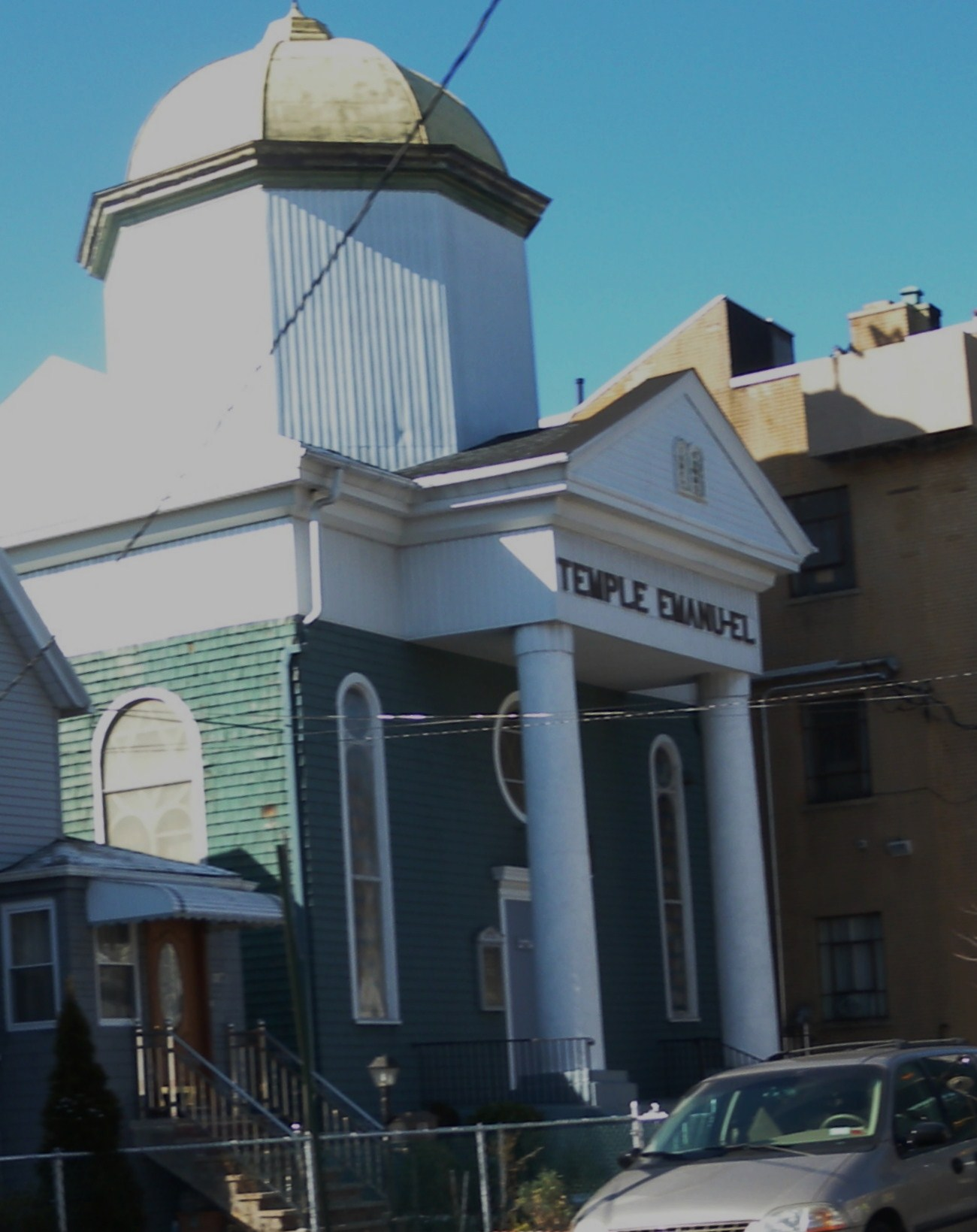
- Temple Emanu-El, in 2012

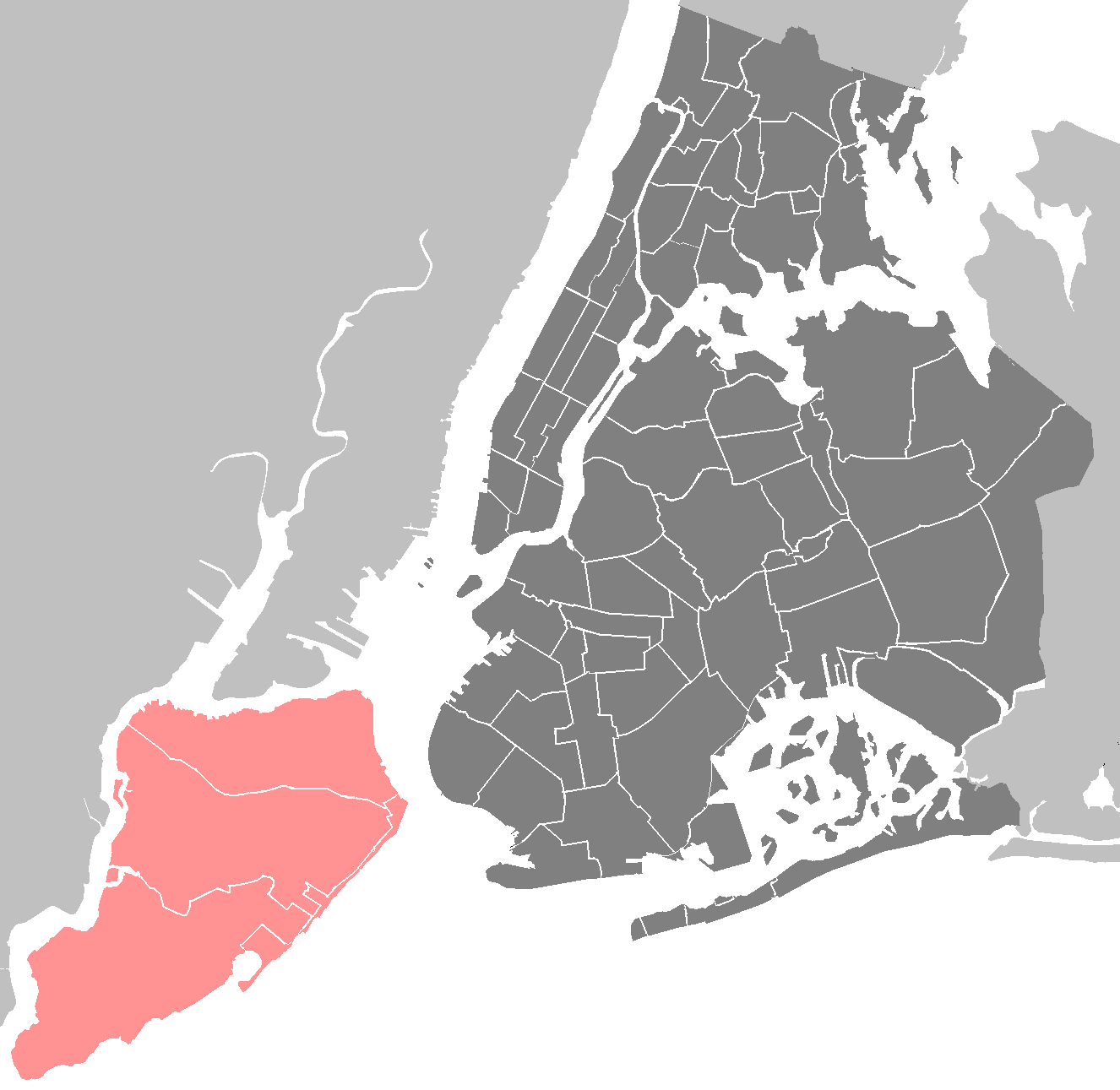
- Location on Staten Island, New York City

Religion
- Affiliation: Conservative Judaism
- Ecclesiastical or organizational status: Synagogue
- Leadership: Rabbi Gerald Sussman
- Status: Active

Location
- Location: 984 Post Avenue, Port Richmond, Staten Island, New York City, New York 10302
- Interactive map of Temple Emanu-El
- Coordinates: 40°37′56″N 74°8′1″W

Architecture
- Architects: Harry W. Pelcher; Frederick C. Zobel
- Type: Synagogue
- Style: Classical Revival
- Completed: 1907

Website
- templeemanuelsi.org
- Temple Emanu-El
- U.S. National Register of Historic Places
- NRHP reference No.: 07000778
- Added to NRHP: August 2, 2007

Temple Emanu-El is a Conservative synagogue located in the Port Richmond neighborhood of Staten Island, New York City, New York, United States. Designed by Pelcher and Zobel and constructed in 1907, the synagogue building was listed on the National Register of Historic Places in 2007. The domed, wooden, clapboard-sided synagogue, located in Staten Island is built in Classical Revival style. A pedimented front porch is supported by a pair of columns, a design that repeats inside in the design of the Torah Ark. The modest building is topped by a dome that supports a Star of David. The dome is supported by an octagonal drum. The dome was originally painted gold and is said to have been visible from miles away.
