= Thomas W. Fitzgerald =

American judge

Thomas W. Fitzgerald (September 1, 1854 – January 19, 1908) was an American lawyer and judge from New York.

== Life ==
Fitzgerald was born on September 1, 1854, in New York City, New York.

Fitzgerald attended the College of the City of New York. He entered the law office of Francis N. Bangs in 1871. In 1872, he moved to Staten Island. In 1875, he was admitted to the bar and practiced law with Bangs until 1884, when he became a clerk of a New York City court. In 1887, President Cleveland appointed him a member of the Board of Pension Appeals. In 1889, he was appointed secretary of the Richmond County board of police commissioners. Later that year, he was elected Richmond County District Attorney, an office he began serving in 1890 and was re-elected to in 1892. He was an active member of the Democratic Party.

Fitzgerald was a delegate to the 1894 New York State Constitutional Convention. In 1898, he was appointed a justice of the Court of Sessions for the Second District, Borough of Richmond.

In October 1905, Justice Maddox of the New York Supreme Court ordered Fitzgerald to appear before a referee and account for money a client of his, Margaret Slevin of Yonkers, entrusted to him and now wanted back. He failed to appear before the court, and when it was revealed Slevin picked Fitzgerald because they were childhood friends the public began to turn against him. He managed to have the case adjourned until August 1906, at which point he was given a three day grace period. When he still didn't appear, in October Justice Jaycox ordered he be jailed, both for the Slevin case and for other revealed debt issues, but he was nowhere to be found as he began moving from place to place in New Jersey to escape the sheriffs.

In February 1907, the Brooklyn Bar Association began to look into Fitzgerald's case, which led him to return to the bench as if nothing happened, even though his salary was cut off, and claimed he was just very sick the whole time. The Appellate Division heard the Brooklyn Bar Association's case and had him convicted and removed from his judgeship. The Court of Appeals upheld the conviction, although he wasn't present at the hearing. By that point, he was hiding in the Kensington Hotel in Newark, New Jersey, under the false name J. W. Carey. In poor health for some time, he died in the hotel on January 19, 1908.

Legal offices
Preceded by George Gallagher	Richmond County District Attorney; 1890–1895	Succeeded by George M. Pinney Jr.
