= Robert E. Johnson (New York politician) =

American lawyer and politician

Robert E. Johnson (July 9, 1909 – December 1, 1995) was an American lawyer and politician from New York.

== Life ==
He was born on July 9, 1909. He attended the public schools in Staten Island.

Johnson was a member of the New York State Senate (24th D.) in 1941 and 1942.

He was again a member of the State Senate in 1947. In August 1947, he resigned his seat, and was appointed by Governor Thomas E. Dewey as District Attorney of Richmond County. In November 1947, Johnson ran to succeed himself, but was defeated by Democrat Herman Methfessel.

Johnson died on December 1, 1995.

== Sources ==
New York State Senate
Preceded by Rae L. Egbert	New York State Senate; 24th District; 1941–1942	Succeeded by Robert S. Bainbridge
Preceded by Robert S. Bainbridge	New York State Senate; 17th District; 1947	Succeeded by John M. Braisted, Jr.
