= Port Richmond, Staten Island =

Neighborhood in New York City

Port Richmond
- Neighborhood of Staten Island
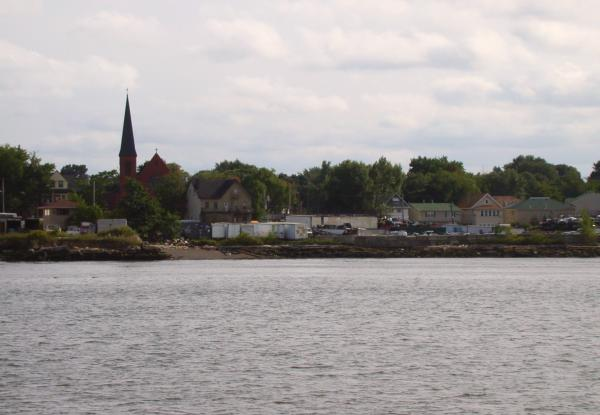
- Port Richmond, seen from Bayonne, New Jersey across the Kill Van Kull.
- Location in New York City
- Coordinates: 40.634°N 74.126°W
- Country: United States
- State: New York
- City: New York City
- Borough: Staten Island
- Community District: Staten Island 1

Area
  - Total: 1.055 sq mi (2.73 km^{2})

Population (2020)
  - Total: 22,609
  - Density: 21,430/sq mi (8,274/km^{2})
- Includes West New Brighton

Economics
  - Median income: $51,135
- ZIP Code: 10302
- Area code: 718, 347, 929, and 917

Port Richmond is a neighborhood situated on the North Shore of Staten Island, a borough of New York City. Port Richmond is bounded by Kill van Kull on the north, Clove Road on the east, Forest Avenue on the south, and the Bayonne Bridge on the west. It is adjacent to West New Brighton to the east, Westerleigh to the south, and Elm Park and Mariners Harbor to the west.

Formerly an independent village, it is one of the oldest neighborhoods on the island. In the 19th century it was an important transportation and industrial center of the island, but this role has vanished nearly completely, leaving a largely blue collar residential area bypassed by the shift of development of the island to its interior after the 1960s. The formerly bustling commercial center along Richmond Avenue (now Port Richmond Avenue) had been largely abandoned at the time, but many small businesses have opened in the area since the late 20th century.

Port Richmond is part of Staten Island Community District 1 and its ZIP Code is 10302. Port Richmond is patrolled by the 121st Precinct of the New York City Police Department.

== History ==
=== Early exploration and settlement ===
The first white European contact with Staten Island was recorded in 1524 by Giovanni da Verrazzano. In 1609 Henry Hudson established Dutch trade in the area and named the island Staaten Eylandt after the Staten-Generaal, the Dutch parliament. However, it was not until the mid-17th century that a mixed Dutch and French settlement was established at New Dorp. Settlers established a cemetery at nearby Port Richmond, which served as the burial ground for residents of northern Staten Island until 1696. The community of Port Richmond grew up around this cemetery, beginning with the Dutch Reform Church that was built there in the early 18th century. This colonnaded Church, still standing on Port Richmond Avenue was built in 1824 after a fire destroyed the original building. From those Dutch roots, Port Richmond evolved into a thriving waterfront industrial and transportation hub. The village incorporated as Port Richmond in 1866, the same year as the Staten Island villages of New Brighton and Edgewater.

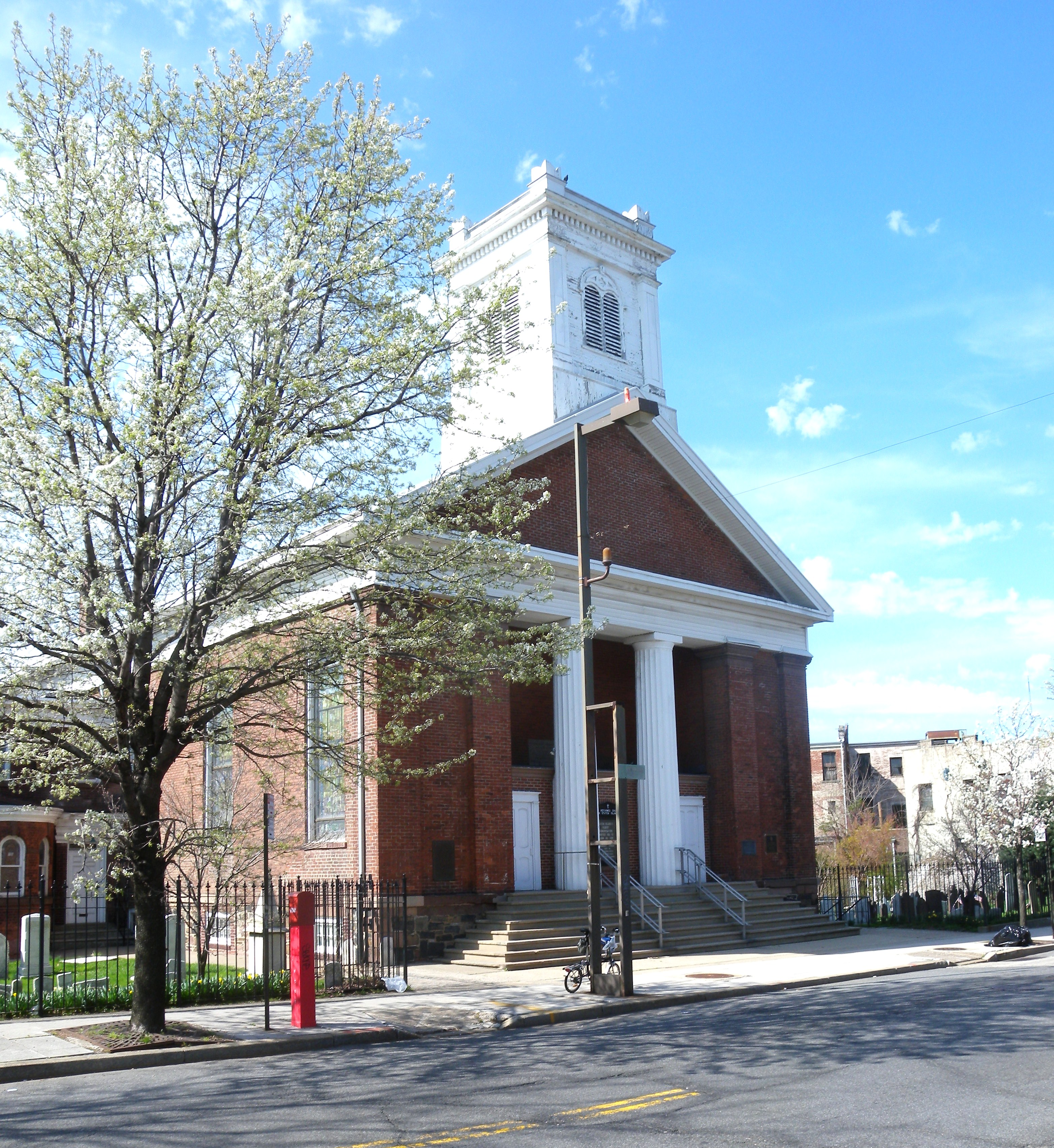
Dutch Reformed Church

Port Richmond has had many names through the years. In the late 17th century it was known simply as The Burial Place. Subsequently, the area was alternately known as Bristol, New Bristol, Irvington, Cyrene, and Cityville. These names were proposed, but Port Richmond eventually won out in 1866. The name "Port Richmond" was given to the place by Rev. Dr. James Brownlee of the Dutch Reformed Church.

In 1700 the area was known as the "burial place" from a cemetery of the Reformed Church on Staten Island near the present Port Richmond Avenue along the waterfront. It later became a transfer point between ferries from New York City to New Brunswick, New Jersey. A ferry landing (called variously "Ryer's Landing", "Mercereau's Landing", and "Decker's Landing") was later constructed for a route linking Staten Island across the Kill Van Kull to Bergen Point (present-day Bayonne, New Jersey). The Bayonne Bridge was constructed in 1931 yet ferry service continued until 1962.

=== 19th century ===
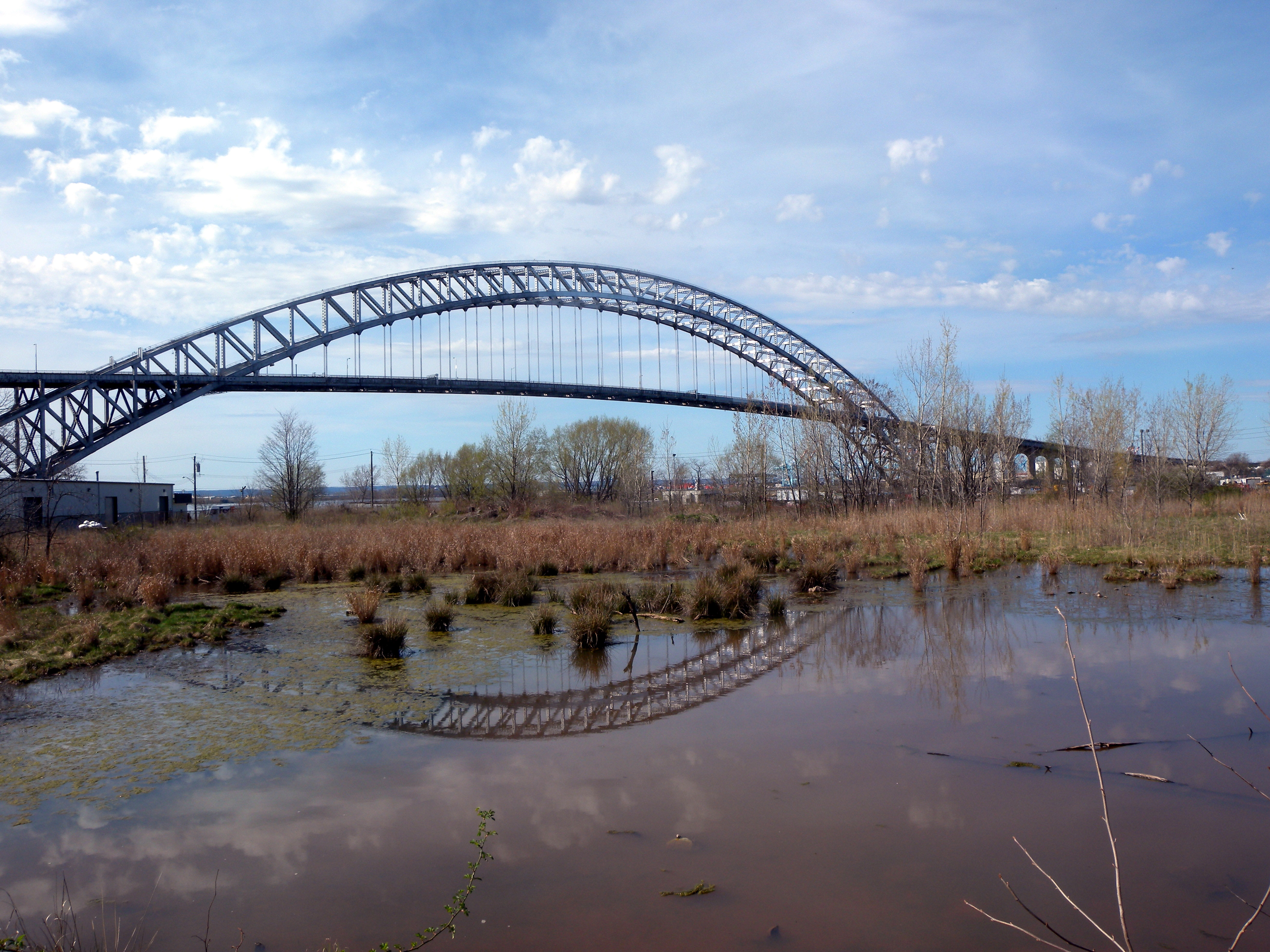
Bayonne Bridge and a pond in Port Richmond

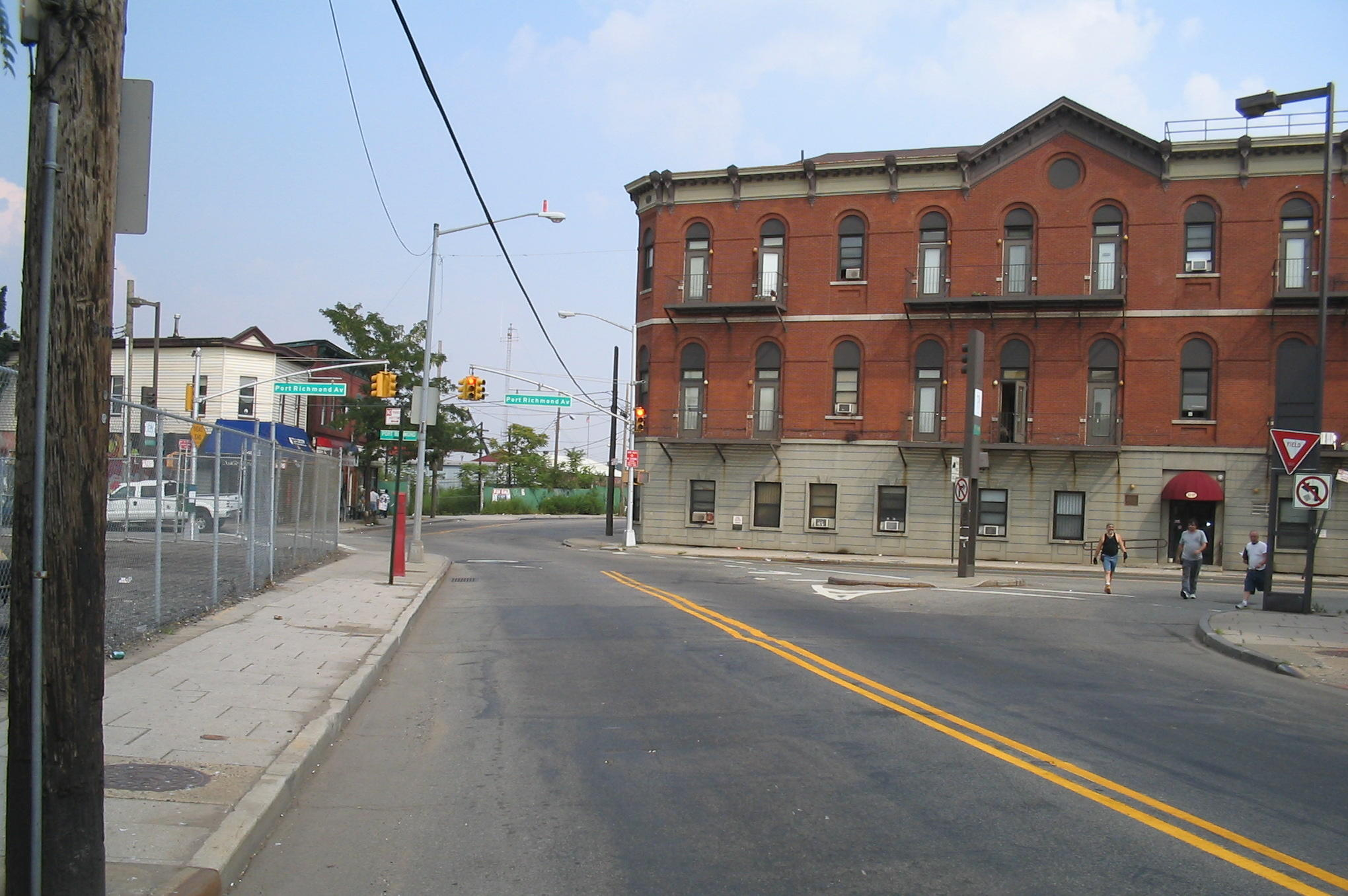
Port Richmond Square, the corner of Richmond Terrace and Richmond Avenue

Port Richmond's location on the Kull Van Kill made it a prime ferry launch from Staten Island to New Jersey. It was a transfer port for freight and passengers traveling by boat between New York City and New Brunswick, New Jersey. This point is the part of Staten Island closest to Port Elizabeth, New Jersey and was once called Mersereau's Point, after Mersereau's Ferry. This point was also known as Lambert's, Collyer's, and Bowman's Point. It was called Lambert's Point during the Revolutionary War and later Collyer's Point. Other ferries that operated from that point were: Dacosta's, Indian, Decker's, Ryers', and Hilleker's. Ryers' and Hilleker's ferries were in competition with one another until David Mersereau bought out both companies in the late 19th century. Ferries ran continually until shortly after the Bayonne Bridge was built in 1931. The area also became the site of an important stop on a coach route between the city and Philadelphia. Port Richmond Avenue has been known over the years as Church Road, Port Richmond Plank Road, Stone Road, and Richmond Avenue. The road is a continuation of an old highway called the Morningstar Road.

Cornelius "Commodore" Vanderbilt, railway tycoon and patriarch of the Vanderbilt family, was born in the area in 1794. In 1836, former Vice President Aaron Burr died in Port Richmond at the St. James Hotel, a prominent hotel which once stood on Richmond Terrace until it was demolished.

In the early 19th century, the area was an overnight coach stop between New York City and Philadelphia. In 1836, a public park was built. In the middle 19th century, the area began to attract immigrants from Ireland and Germany. Among the industries established in the area was the only whale oil processing plant on Staten Island. It was later replaced by a linseed oil processing plant that operated until the 20th century. Other industries included lumber and coal yards, as a dye processing plant. Because oyster harvesting was a booming business along the mudflats in New York Harbor, many successful oyster boat captains built mansions on Richmond Terrace facing the Kill van Kull in the 1840s and 1850s. Industries along the waterfront included lumber and coal yards.

In 1883, Port Richmond was described as a model village:

The general appearance of Port Richmond is inviting and pleasing. The streets are wide, well-macadamized and smooth; the side walks well paved and generally shaded by trees of large growth. The business blocks are substantial and the dwellings range from pretentious mansions to quiet cottage

Veterans Park in Port Richmond, with St Philips Baptist Church and the Port Richmond Library in the background.

In 1866, the neighborhood was incorporated as Port Richmond. In the 1880s, the Staten Island Railway constructed a North Shore branch with a stop in the village on Richmond Avenue, which had become a main shopping area of the island. In the 1870, St. Philip's Baptist Church, the oldest of the three black Baptist congregations on the Island, was formed. The church still stands at 77 Bennett Street, next to the Port Richmond Library that was built with funds from Andrew Carnegie in 1902. At the beginning of the 20th century, the neighborhood attracted large numbers of Italian, Polish, Norwegian, and Swedish immigrants. Temple Emanu-El erected its domed, Classical building in 1907.

=== 20th century ===
When telephone service was upgraded in New York City in December 1930, a telephone exchange bearing the designation "Port Richmond 7" was created, its territory including the neighborhood itself along with many other communities on the western and central North Shore plus the island's then-sparsely populated, rural interior. This exchange was disconnected in 1948 when a "Port Washington 7" exchange was established to serve the town by that name in Nassau County, on Long Island; the Port Richmond exchange customers were moved to exchanges to the east, such as "Saint George 7".

The neighborhood suffered a severe economic decline in the latter half of the 20th century, largely as a result of the shift of development and commercial activity to the center of the island, following the construction of the Verrazzano–Narrows Bridge and Staten Island Mall. The North Shore Branch of the Staten Island Railway that ran through the neighborhood connecting it to St. George was mainly a freight railroad. It was owned by the Baltimore and Ohio Railroad and was briefly, in 1925 and 1926, used as a passenger service link to the ferry launch at St. George. This was suspended as the boat ride was slower than the usual B&O trip to the CNJ Terminal in Jersey City, New Jersey. During World War II some trains were used to move troops. This branch was closed in 1953, leaving behind a dilapidated track and Port Richmond station along Richmond (now Port Richmond) Avenue. Plans for reopening this line were studied at various times during the 1990s and early 2000s as a Staten Island light rail line.

== Demographics ==
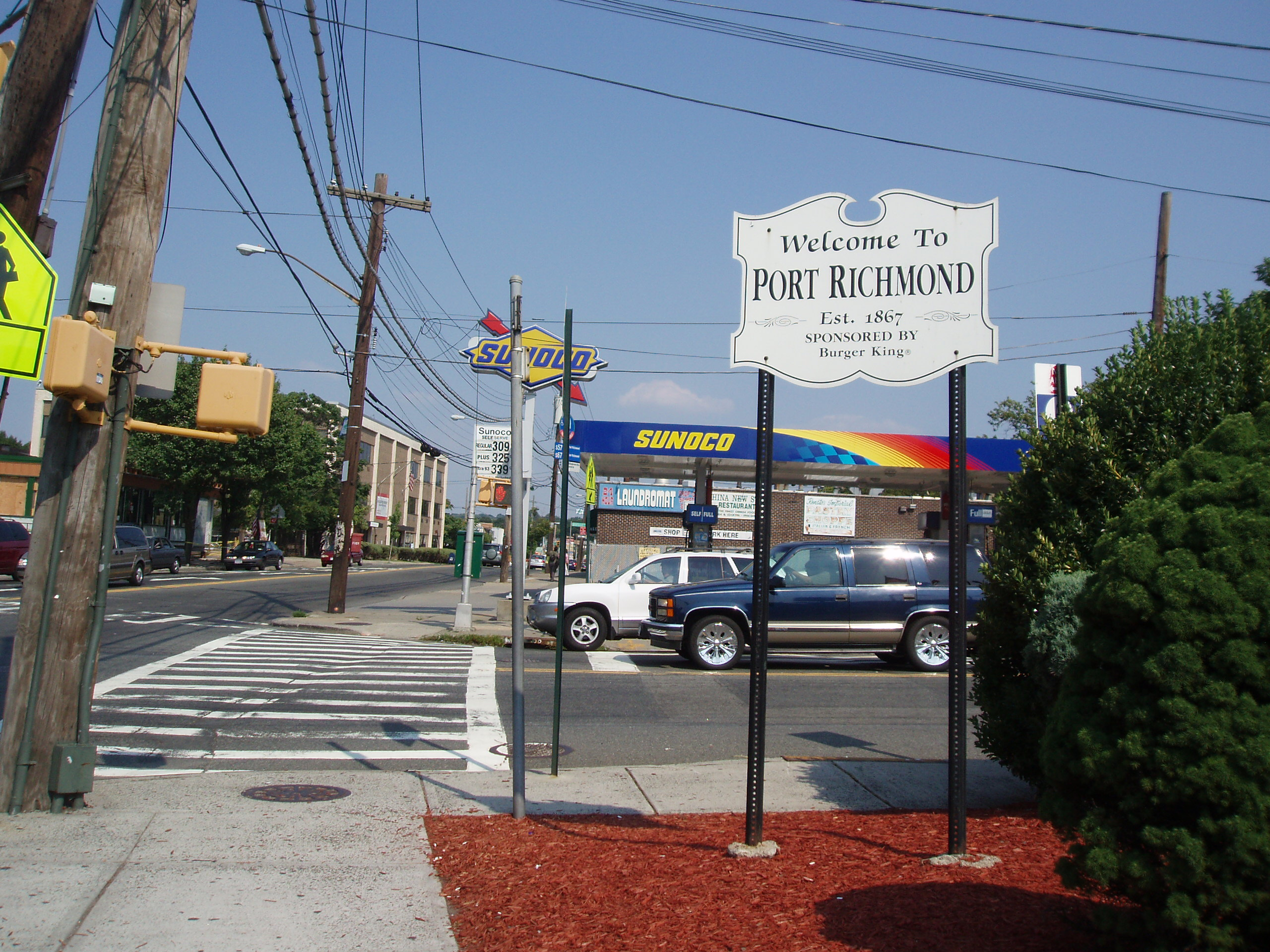
Welcome To Port Richmond sign

For census purposes, the New York City Department of City Planning classifiesPort Richmond as part of the Neighborhood Tabulation Area called Port Richmond SI0106. This designated neighborhood had 22,609 inhabitants based on data from the 2020 United States Census. This was an increase of 1,855 persons (8.9%) from the 20,754 counted in 2010. The neighborhood had a population density of 27.0 inhabitants per acre (14,500/sq mi; 5,600/km^{2}).

The racial makeup of the neighborhood was 17.6% (3,989) White (Non-Hispanic), 22.7% (5,124) Black (Non-Hispanic), 6.9% (1,567) Asian, and 3.7% (838) from two or more races. Hispanic or Latino of any race were 49.1% (11,091) of the population.

According to the 2020 United States Census, this area has many cultural communities of over 1,000 inhabitants. This include residents who identify as Mexican, Puerto Rican, Irish, Italian, and African American.

The largest age group was people 5-19 years old, which made up 23.1% of the residents. 70.0% of the households had at least one family present. Out of the 6,951 households, 38.4% had a married couple (18.9% with a child under 18), 7.4% had a cohabiting couple (4.2% with a child under 18), 22.3% had a single male (2.5% with a child under 18), and 31.9% had a single female (9.1% with a child under 18). 41.3% of households had children under 18. In this neighborhood, 56.0% of non-vacant housing units are renter-occupied.

The entirety of Community District 1, which comprises Port Richmond and other neighborhoods on the North Shore, had 181,484 inhabitants as of NYC Health's 2018 Community Health Profile, with an average life expectancy of 79.0 years. This is lower than the median life expectancy of 81.2 for all New York City neighborhoods. Most inhabitants are youth and middle-aged adults: 24% are between the ages of between 0–17, 27% between 25 and 44, and 26% between 45 and 64. The ratio of college-aged and elderly residents was lower, at 10% and 13% respectively.

As of 2017, the median household income in Community District 1 was $48,018, though the median income in Port Richmond individually was $51,135. In 2018, an estimated 21% of Port Richmond and the North Shore residents lived in poverty, compared to 17% in all of Staten Island and 20% in all of New York City. One in fourteen residents (7%) were unemployed, compared to 6% in Staten Island and 9% in New York City. Rent burden, or the percentage of residents who have difficulty paying their rent, is 51% in Port Richmond and the North Shore, compared to the boroughwide and citywide rates of 49% and 51% respectively. Based on this calculation, as of 2018, Port Richmond and the North Shore are considered high-income relative to the rest of the city and not gentrifying.

The Black and Latino populations are largest in the northern section of the neighborhood, near Richmond Terrace. The southeastern portion of the neighborhood (roughly south of Post Avenue & east of Port Richmond Avenue) is the section with the largest percentage of Whites (almost 50%), and is sometimes referred to as "Port Richmond Center" or "Upper Port Richmond". The 10302 zip code (which is mostly Port Richmond, but also includes part of Westerleigh) has the highest percentage of Hispanics of any zip code on Staten Island, at 41.3%. Within the Hispanic population, it is the only zip code on Staten Island where Mexicans outnumber Puerto Ricans: Mexicans make up 20% of the population of the zip code. The zip code includes parts of nearby Westerleigh, so Mexicans make up roughly 23% of the population of Port Richmond, with the presence being highest along Port Richmond Avenue, and in the northern part of the neighborhood in general.

=== Racial tensions between blacks and Hispanics ===
The African-American community that had long occupied Port Richmond's Northern quarters began to see a large influx of Mexican immigrants move in alongside them starting late in the 1980s. The Mexicans transformed many boarded up storefronts along Port Richmond Avenue and quickly made the commercial strip the center of Latino culture on Staten Island. Still many of Port Richmond's Mexicans line busy neighborhood streets every morning looking to be picked up for work as day laborers. Since they often commute on foot and usually have money in their pockets, the immigrants have long been targeted for violent muggings on Port Richmond streets. The tensions between the area's long-time inhabitants and its newcomers have been well documented for years. Several outreach groups have since popped up to address the community's issues. Still, mistrust persists on both sides of the fence, as portions of northern Port Richmond (especially west of Port Richmond Avenue) have shifted from being predominantly Black to predominantly Hispanic.

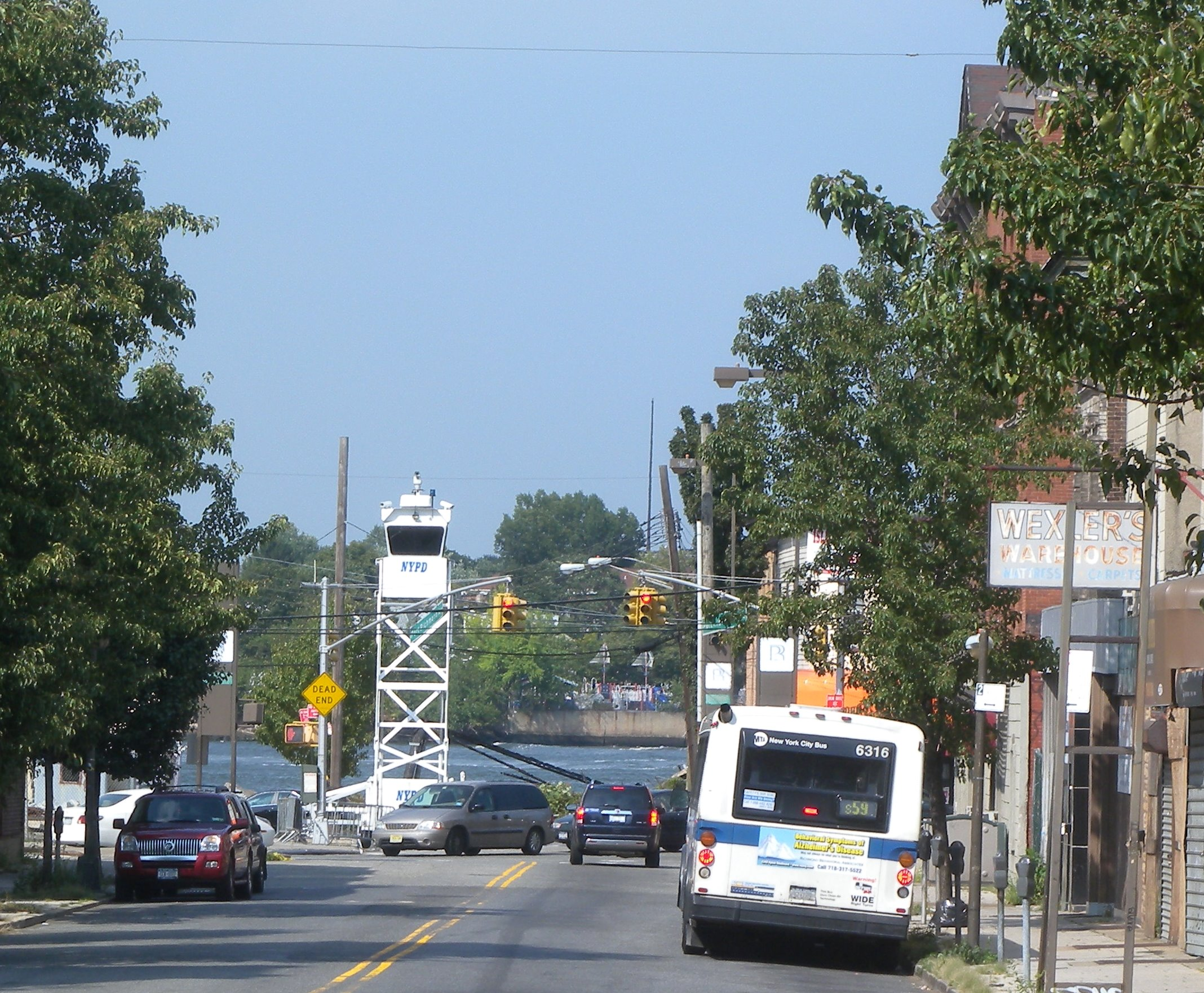
Police surveillance tower at foot of Port Richmond Avenue

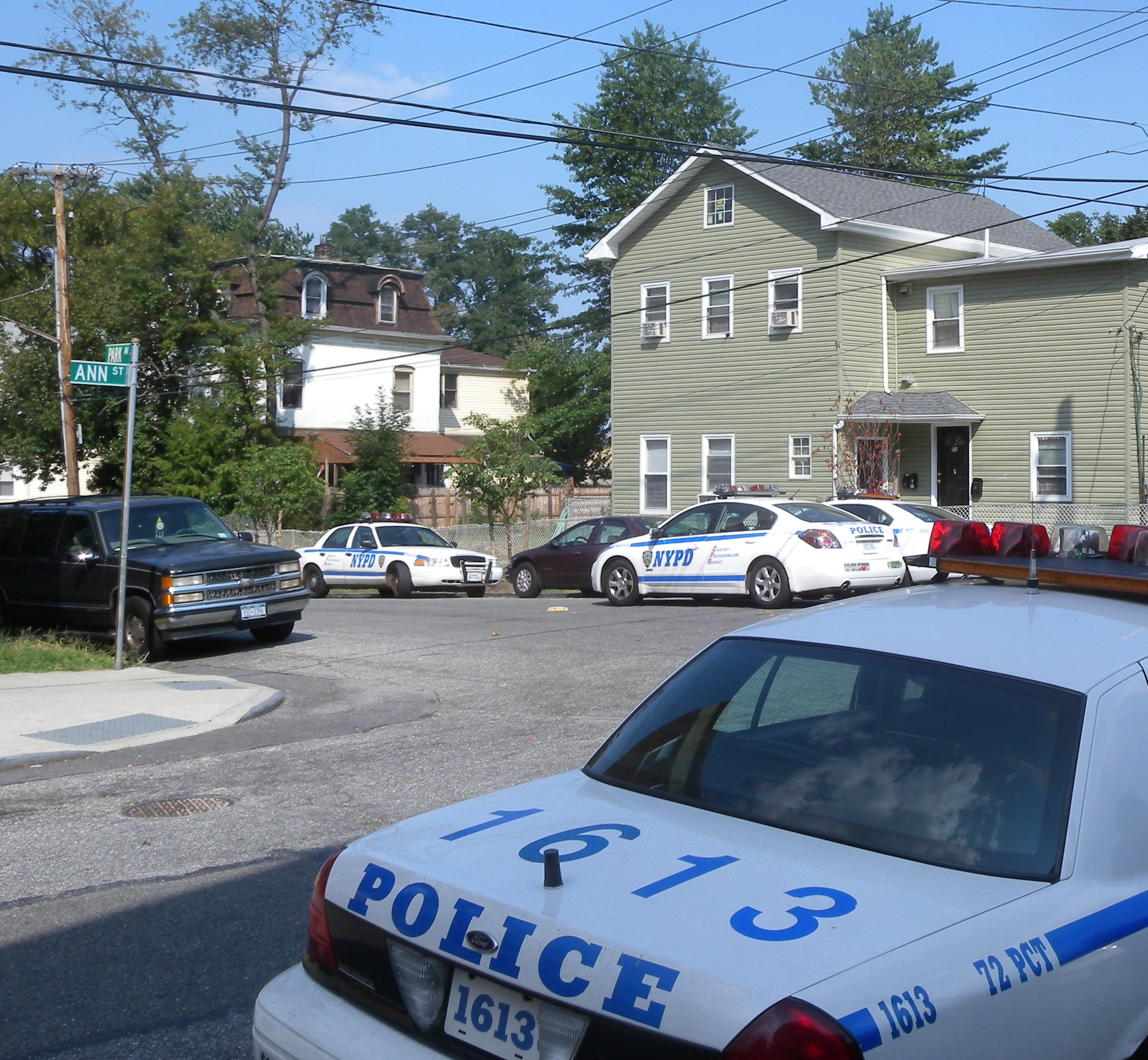
Police presence, which was intensified

This led to an incident, whence in the early morning hours of April 5, 2010, 26-year-old baker Rodulfo Olmedo was on his way home from a local club on Port Richmond Avenue when he was set upon by three African-American and one Hispanic teenagers, who badly beat Olmedo with unidentified objects believed to be baseball bats or wooden planks and possibly a chain before robbing his unconscious body of cash and a cellphone. After being helped by a passer-by and brought to the hospital, Olmedo, a 13-year resident of the U.S., told police that throughout the attack, which was captured on nearby surveillance cameras, he was verbally discriminated against. The attack provoked outrage both politically and locally, but while many felt the attack was solely a result of the victim's nationality, the attackers insisted that they knew Olmedo and were merely settling an earlier score with him. Regardless, the incident caused similar but unpublicized incidents, which had been taking place, to be publicized. After the incident, the United States Department of Justice began assisting community officials in their efforts to develop a neighborhood watch or a "Crime Response Team", a group of citizens that would possibly work with the NYPD to report suspicious activity and prevent more violence in the neighborhood, as well as to organize a series of meetings to facilitate community dialogue. They also set out to create "safe spaces", which was not the first time the idea was floated. These are willing businesses that are open late, such as bodegas or delis, where people who feel like they are being followed or otherwise fear for their safety, can seek refuge and be assisted by workers with contacting the police.

== Community activism and outreach ==
Port Richmond has several community activist and outreach programs and organizations:

- Northfield Community Local Development Corp.
- Port Richmond Anti-Violence Task Force
- Make the Road New York
- Eye Openers Youth Against Violence
- Project Hospitality
- El Centro de Hospitalidad (Latino Civic Association of Staten Island)
- Port Richmond Improvement Association
- Community Health Action of Staten Island (formerly Staten Island Aids Task Force)/Port Richmond Wellness Center
- Community Health Center of Richmond
- Amazing Grace Interfaith Church
- Community By Community
- Labyrinth Arts Collective, Inc.

=== Wagner College's Port Richmond Partnership Initiative ===
In March 2008, local Wagner College chose Port Richmond as its target community to begin a five-year plan between the college and seven community groups with the intention of focusing all of Wagner's volunteer activities squarely on the one community in hopes of improving the overall quality of life for the neighborhood's residents by curbing several disturbing trends in the neighborhood ranging from poor health care access, youth obesity, racial/ethnic tensions and youth violence to limited economic and educational opportunities. The students would then be required to report on their progress as part of their course requirements with the ultimate goal being to make significant improvements in the aforementioned fields and eventually branching out to other distressed North Shore neighborhoods.

The Port Richmond initiative was lauded by former president Bill Clinton at The Clinton Global Initiative University (CGI U) Meeting on February 14, 2009, at the University of Texas at Austin before a star-studded crowd. The CGI U is the college student/administrator-based offshoot of his Clinton Global Initiative, a non-partisan organization that convenes global leaders to devise and implement innovative solutions to the world's most pressing problems.

== Police and crime ==
Port Richmond and the West Shore are patrolled by the 121st Precinct of the NYPD, located at 970 Richmond Avenue. The 121st Precinct was split from the 120th Precinct in 2013; the latter ranked 12th safest out of 69 patrol areas for per-capita crime in 2010. As of 2018, with a non-fatal assault rate of 94 per 100,000 people, Port Richmond and the North Shore's rate of violent crimes per capita is more than that of the city as a whole. The incarceration rate of 719 per 100,000 people is higher than that of the city as a whole. The 121st Precinct saw one murder, 13 rapes, 86 robberies, 216 felony assaults, 90 burglaries, 397 grand larcenies, and 115 grand larcenies auto in 2022.

Port Richmond has long been plagued by high levels of crime, such as prostitution, drugs and violence. However, much of it takes place in the northern part of the neighborhood, north of roughly Post Avenue. In 2009, findings showed that Port Richmond (zip code 10302) received a 7 on a scale of 1–10 in terms of violent crime level - the highest for any zip code on Staten Island (one other Staten Island zip code also received a 7). The United States violent crime average for a zip code is a 3. Port Richmond also received a 6 on an identical scale measuring property crime. The United States property crime average for a zip code is also a 3.

== Fire safety ==
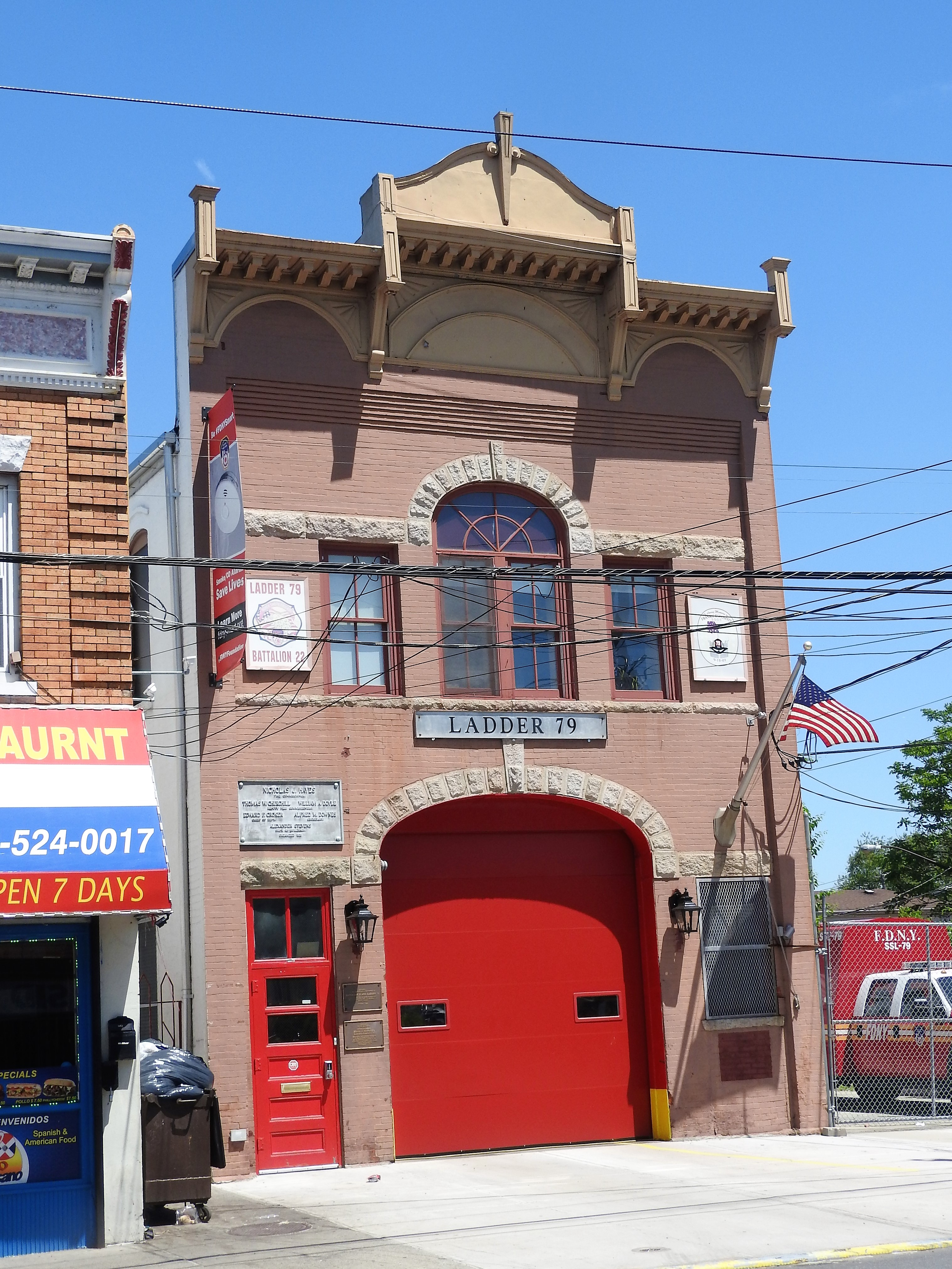
Ladder 79 on Castleton Avenue

Port Richmond is served by the New York City Fire Department (FDNY)'s Engine Co. 157/Ladder Co. 80, located at 1573 Castleton Avenue.

== Health ==
As of 2018, preterm births and births to teenage mothers are more common in Port Richmond and the North Shore than in other places citywide. In Port Richmond and the North Shore, there were 96 preterm births per 1,000 live births (compared to 87 per 1,000 citywide), and 22.6 births to teenage mothers per 1,000 live births (compared to 19.3 per 1,000 citywide). Port Richmond and the North Shore have a relatively average population of residents who are uninsured. In 2018, this population of uninsured residents was estimated to be 12%, the same as the citywide rate of 12%.

The concentration of fine particulate matter, the deadliest type of air pollutant, in Port Richmond and the North Shore is 0.0071 milligrams per cubic metre (7.1×10^{−9} oz/ft^{3}), less than the city average. Sixteen percent of Port Richmond and the North Shore residents are smokers, which is higher than the city average of 14% of residents being smokers. In Port Richmond and the North Shore, 24% of residents are obese, 9% are diabetic, and 26% have high blood pressure—compared to the citywide averages of 24%, 11%, and 28% respectively. In addition, 21% of children are obese, compared to the citywide average of 20%.

Eighty-seven percent of residents eat some fruits and vegetables every day, which is the same as the city's average of 87%. In 2018, 77% of residents described their health as "good", "very good", or "excellent", equal to the city's average of 78%. For every supermarket in Port Richmond and the North Shore, there are 28 bodegas.

The nearest major hospital is Richmond University Medical Center in West New Brighton.

== Post office and ZIP Codes ==
Port Richmond is located within the ZIP Code 10302. The United States Postal Service operates the Port Richmond Station post office at 364 Port Richmond Avenue.

== Education ==
Port Richmond and the North Shore generally have a lower rate of college-educated residents than the rest of the city as of 2018. While 37% of residents age 25 and older have a college education or higher, 15% have less than a high school education and 48% are high school graduates or have some college education. By contrast, 39% of Staten Island residents and 43% of city residents have a college education or higher. The percentage of Port Richmond and the North Shore students excelling in math rose from 49% in 2000 to 65% in 2011, though reading achievement declined from 55% to 51% during the same time period.

Port Richmond and the North Shore's rate of elementary school student absenteeism is slightly higher than the rest of New York City. In Port Richmond and the North Shore, 25% of elementary school students missed twenty or more days per school year, more than the citywide average of 20%. Additionally, 73% of high school students in Port Richmond and the North Shore graduate on time, about the same as the citywide average of 75%.

=== Schools ===
The New York City Department of Education operates the following elementary schools in Port Richmond:

- PS 19 The Curtis School (grades PK-5)
- PS 20 Port Richmond (grades K-5)

Port Richmond High School, located in Port Richmond, had a new building constructed in 1993, but the school was originally opened in 1927. The school has about 2,700 students and is known as one of the highest performing high schools on Staten Island. The high school has a reputation for excellence in sports and academics. Newsweek has named Port Richmond High School in its list of "Best High Schools" in many recent years. The local middle school is Markham Intermediate School, located at 20 Houston Street in Westerleigh.

The Roman Catholic Archdiocese of New York operates Staten Island Catholic schools. St. Roch Parish School closed in 2011. In its final year it had 96 students, meaning the building was 35% utilized.

=== Library ===
The New York Public Library (NYPL)'s Port Richmond branch is located at 75 Bennett Street. Interest in a library began in 1833, and various private library groups operated during the 19th century. The Port Richmond branch's current Carnegie library structure was built in 1905, becoming Port Richmond's permanent library. The Chimes Playhouse auditorium was constructed in 1939, and the Children's Room was rehabilitated in 2008.

== Transportation ==
Port Richmond is the site of the Castleton Bus Depot, at Castleton and Jewett Avenues. It is served by many local and express buses, including the S40, S44, S46, S48, S53, S54, S57, S59 and S66 local buses; the S89, S90, S94, S96 and S98 limited-stop buses; and the SIM3, SIM3C, SIM30 and SIM35 express buses. The X13 and X16 express bus routes ran to Port Richmond, but were discontinued by the MTA in 2010 due to budget cuts. The abandoned North Shore Branch of the Staten Island Railway runs through Port Richmond, and the area's eponymous station still stands.

== Historical sites ==
=== Ritz Theater ===
The Ritz Theater, a movie theater and vaudeville venue now a home improvement showroom, located at Port Richmond Avenue and Anderson Avenue, once hosted the biggest names in rock and roll and show business. It was built in 1924 by Sol Brill, who was also responsible for the construction of Staten Island's Liberty, New Dorp, and St. George Theaters. The spacious Ritz Theater boasted 2,126 seats and was one of New York's premier vaudeville houses. During the blizzard of 1947 the theater's marquee was destroyed and was never restored. The theater also served as a prime American rock concert venue in the late 1960s and early 1970s. Since 1985, the theater has been owned and operated as a tile showroom by the Pedulla family. Portions of the theater's original function can still be seen inside, and its famous murals still grace the walls.

=== Old PS 20 ===
Now essentially a retirement community, it is one of the few remaining examples of 19th-century school buildings on Staten Island. Old PS 20 was the site of a school since 1842, when the two-story brick building and old stable served as classrooms for the students. The building that now stands on the site was built in 1891 after the old buildings were condemned for sanitary reasons. An addition to the 1891 construction was added in 1898 by James Warriner Moulton who attempted to give the addition what he termed greater "strength" and a "more manly character." The architecture of the building draws from a variety of styles including Romanesque Revival, neo-Classical, Italian villa, and Americanized Queen Anne. The hodge-podge of styles suggests a vernacular approach and reflects the reality of the 19th century, when school districts were responsible for designing, constructing, and maintaining their own buildings. Old PS 20 was within the Staten Island school district until it was disbanded following the consolidation of New York City in 1898. The bell tower on Old PS 20 is significant because it reflects civic pride. It was the first school building to have such an impressive tower and is the last remaining example. Old PS 20 was designated a Landmark Site by the Landmarks Preservation Commission in 1988.

=== 121 Heberton Avenue ===
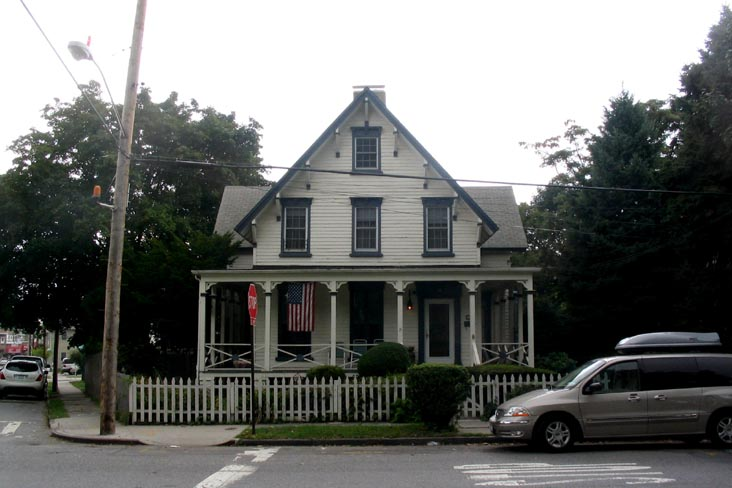
121 Herberton Avenue

This is a 2 1/2-story frame building, is located on the eastern side of Veteran's Park, once the most fashionable locations in the neighborhood. Heberton Avenue is known for a plethora of handsome old houses. 121 Heberton, built by James G. Burger around 1859–61, is one of the most impressive. The residence is a rare surviving example in New York City of a picturesque villa in the Rustic style. The design combines elements seen in the pattern books of Gervase Wheeler, Calvert Vaux, and Samuel Sloan. Features associated with this style are broad gables, openwork brackets, long outside galleries, raised basement, and simple ornament. The house was first owned by a prosperous oysterman and abolitionist named Captain John J. Housman, then leased to tenants, and finally fell into the hands of the Brown family. The Browns had a number of notable family members in government in Richmond County. Though the house is no longer in the Brown family, it is still used as a residence today and recent renovations have preserved the unique historic quality of the house. The 121 Heberton Avenue House was designated a Landmark Site by the Landmarks Preservation Commission in 2002.

=== Bodine Creek ===
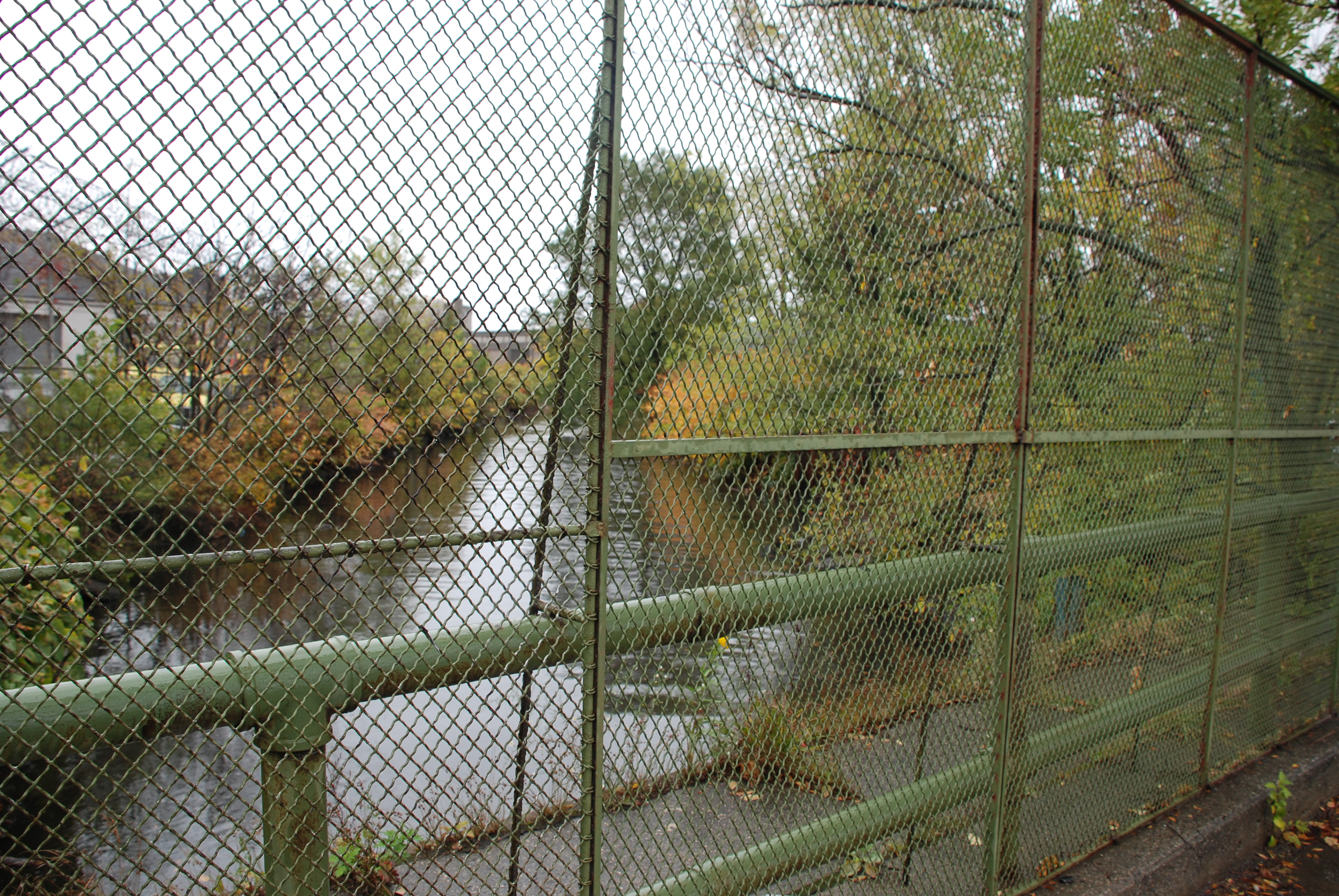
Bodine Creek

It is a short walk from The New York Public Library and Veteran's Park. Bodine has had many names over the centuries, including Palmer's Run and Mill Brook. Near Bodine Creek was Bodine's Pond, used for years by various industries. The Richmond County Water Company once supplied water to the area, but when Bodine's Pond was eventually drained, the wells of the company were sunk in the remaining marsh. The edges of the pond are still visible on the landscape in the form of Columbia Street and Jewett Avenue. In 1922, the New York Times reported that a 13-year-old boy was killed by a train while crabbing from the railway trestle over Bodine Creek. Other fatalities have been reported from drowning and train accidents.

=== Port Richmond Hotel ===
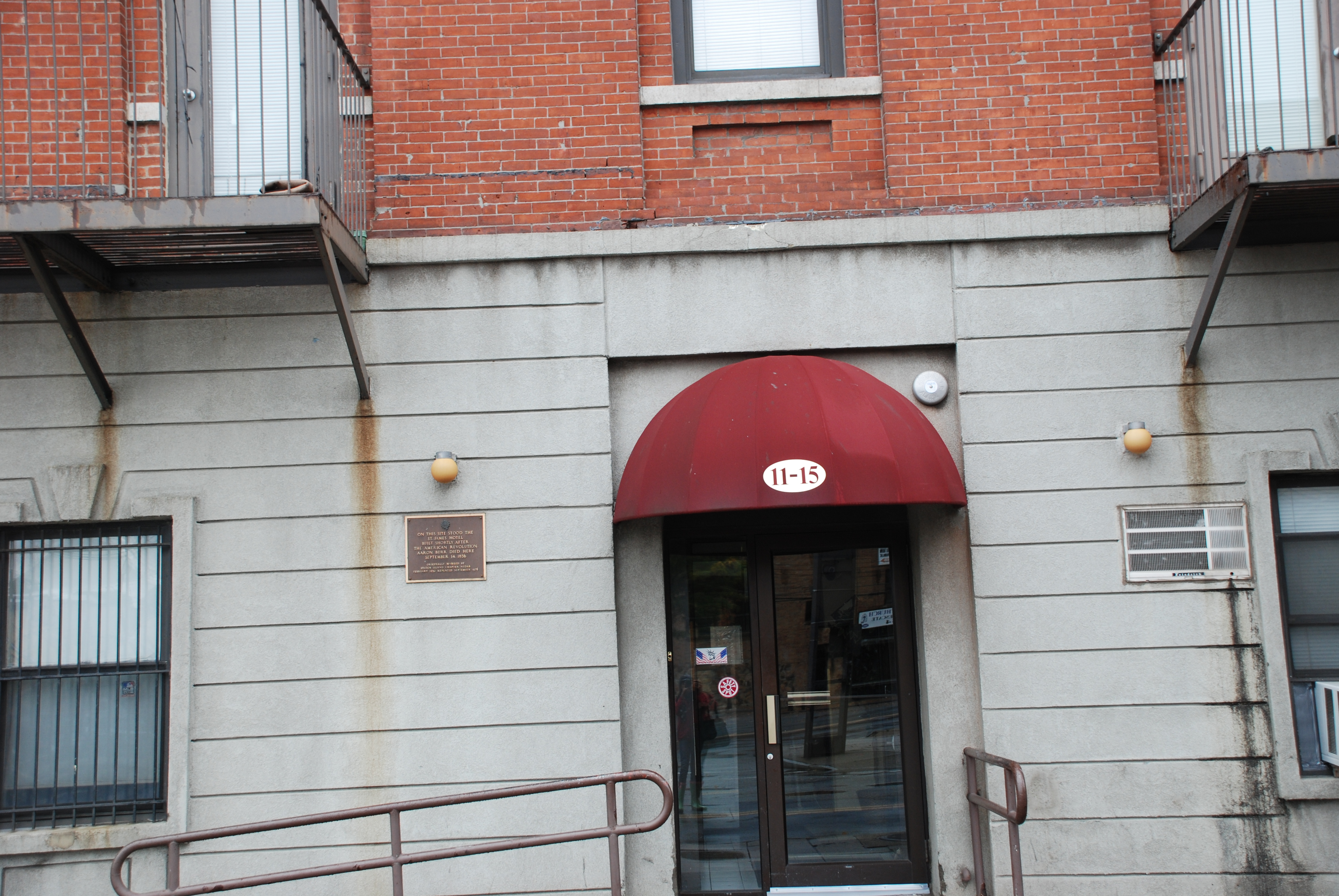
Port Richmond Hotel

The Port Richmond Hotel, a barracks-like building facing the Bayonne ferry terminal, was once the elegant St. James Hotel. The St. James Hotel was erected in 1787 remained until 1945, when it was demolished. As identified by a plaque on the Griffith Block building, it was the last home of Aaron Burr, the third Vice President of the United States. He died there on September 14, 1836.

=== Reformed Protestant Dutch Church and Burial Ground ===
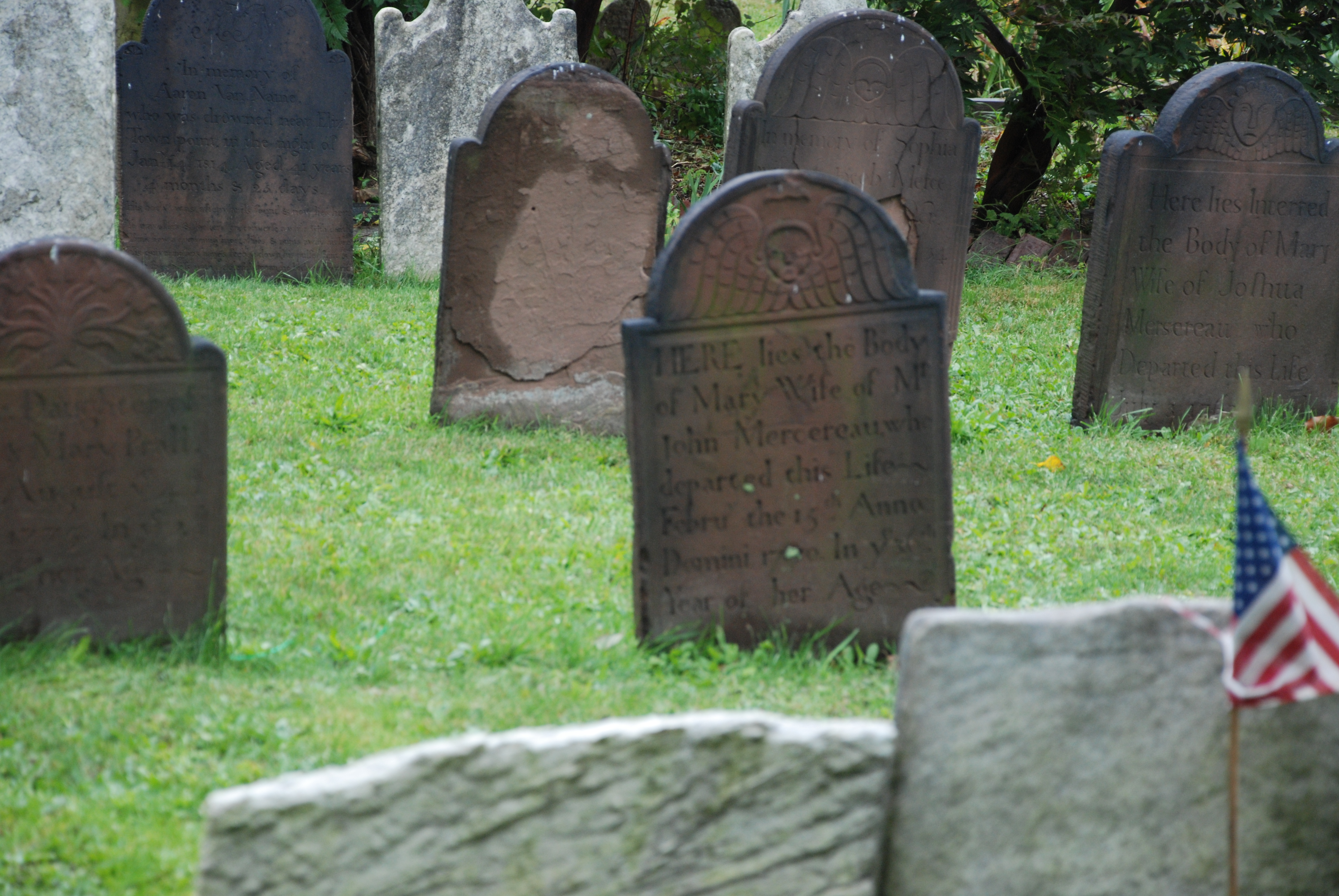
Tombstones

Built in 1845 in Greek revival style, this is the third church on the site. It was listed on the National Register of Historic Places in 2005 as the Reformed Church on Staten Island. The first, a hexagonal wooden building erected in 1714, was destroyed by the British during the revolution. The original building, a long structure around which the community now known as Port Richmond grew, was erected on land donated in 1714 by Governor Hunter. The original license to the Dutch Congregation signed by Governor Hunter in 1714 is preserved. The grounds also serve in commemoration of the Five Brothers from Staten Island who served in the Revolutionary War. The Daughters of the American Revolution recognized the Brothers Mersereau: Joshua - 3rd Quarter Master General, Jacob - Colonel, Cornelius - Soldier, John - Captain, and Paul - Sailor.

== In media ==
The cult classic movie release Combat Shock, the independent directing debut of Staten Island native Buddy Giovinazzo, is set in and was largely filmed in Port Richmond, where the main character dwells in apocalyptic squalor. The movie has been hailed for its raw depiction of inner city life and use of the gritty streetscapes it was filmed amid.

In December 2009, Arcadia Publishing released a book named Port Richmond on its Images of America product line about the neighborhood's history, including its ethnic diversity and the effect various immigrant groups have had on the community. The book was written by Phillip Papas and Lori R. Weintrob.

== Notable people ==
- Aaron Burr, U.S. vice president, died in Port Richmond at the Winants (also, Saint James or Port Richmond) Hotel
- Carmine Giovinazzo, born in Port Richmond, actor in Black Hawk Down and CSI:NY
- John Henry Lake, 1900 Olympic bronze medal cyclist
- Anning S. Prall, born in Port Richmond in 1870, U.S. Representative, Chair of the Federal Communications Commission
- Jacob Tyson, born in Richmond County in 1773, U.S. Representative, New York State Senate, buried in Dutch Reformed Churchyard

== See also ==
- List of Staten Island neighborhoods
- List of people from Staten Island
