= List of people from Staten Island =

This is a list of notable people who were either born or have lived in Staten Island, today a borough of New York City, at some time in their lives. The list does not include people who were only in Staten Island as college students, military personnel, hospital patients, or prisoners. Approximately 800 people (or performing groups) are listed alphabetically under their primary vocations, which themselves are listed alphabetically.

== Actors, actresses, dancers, models, film and TV ==
=== Past ===
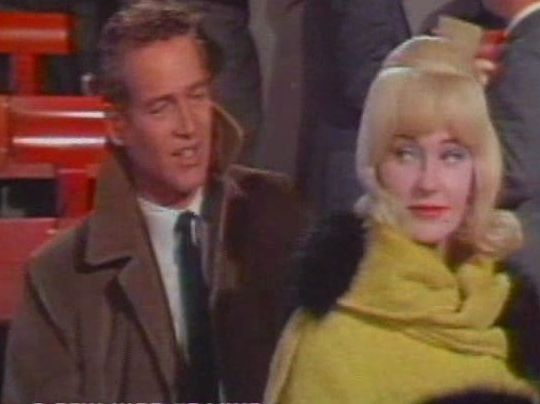
Paul Newman and Joanne Woodward

- Phyllis Allen (1861–1938) – comedian who worked with fellow Staten Island native Mabel Normand and other silent-film stars
- Arthur Anderson (1922–2016) – actor of radio, stage, film, and television; voice of Lucky Charms leprechaun
- Leslie Barrett (1919–2010) – frequent actor in theater and television, especially 1950s–1960s
- Maurice Barrymore (born Herbert Blythe, 1849–1905) – vaudeville actor; father of John, Lionel, and Ethel Barrymore; lived in Fort Wadsworth, with their grandmother Louisa Lane Drew
- John Dehner (1915–1992) – television and movie actor; born on Staten Island
- Raoul Pene Du Bois (1914–1985) – costume and scenic designer for stage and film; two-time Tony Award winner
- David Dukes (1945–2000) – stage, television and movie actor; lived briefly in Brighton Heights, Staten Island
- Joey Faye (born Joseph Antony Palladino, c.1909–1997) – comic actor in vaudeville, theater, films and television
- David Froman (1938–2010) – portrayed twins Gunther and Bruno on The Edge of Night, and Lt. Bob Brooks on Matlock; once lived in Livingston
- Ben Grauer (1908–1977) – longtime broadcaster on radio and television
- Neal Hart (1879–1949) – actor and director of silent films
- Allen Jenkins (born Alfred McGonegal, 1900–1974) – character actor, voice of cartoon Top Cat's Officer Dibble; born on Staten Island
- Betsy Joslyn (born 1954) – Broadway actress, best known for Sweeney Todd
- Thomas W. Keene (born Thomas R. Eagleson, 1840–1898) – Shakespearean actor
- Guy Kibbee (1882–1956) – stage and film actor, father of CUNY Chancellor Robert Kibbee
- Paul Land (born Paul Calandrillo, 1956–2007) – actor, Spring Break, The Idolmaker
- Robert Loggia (1930–2015) – actor, Scarface, The Sopranos, Big; attended New Dorp High School and Wagner College
- Allan Manings (1924–2010) – television producer and comedy writer, best known for Rowan & Martin's Laugh-In, Good Times, One Day at a Time
- Paul Newman (1925–2008) – Academy Award-winning actor; married to Joanne Woodward; lived in St. George, Staten Island
- Mabel Normand (1892–1930) – silent film actress, director, writer, producer; frequent collaborator with Fatty Arbuckle, Charlie Chaplin, Mack Sennett; grew up in New Brighton
- Edward Platt (1916–1974) – actor who played "The Chief" on the 1960s TV show Get Smart; born on Staten Island
- Frances Robinson (born Marion Frances Ladd, 1916–1971) – actress in early films
- Ivy Scott (1886–1947) – actress on radio and Broadway
- Raymond Serra (1936–2003) – actor in television and films, including Gotti and the first two Teenage Mutant Ninja Turtles movies
- Don Stewart (1935–2006) – actor, best known for his long-running role as attorney Mike Bauer on Guiding Light
- Robert Taber (1865–1904) – Shakespearean actor; brother of mathematician Henry Taber, both born on Staten Island
- Joanne Woodward (born 1930) – Academy Award-winning actress; married to Paul Newman; lived in St. George

=== Recent ===
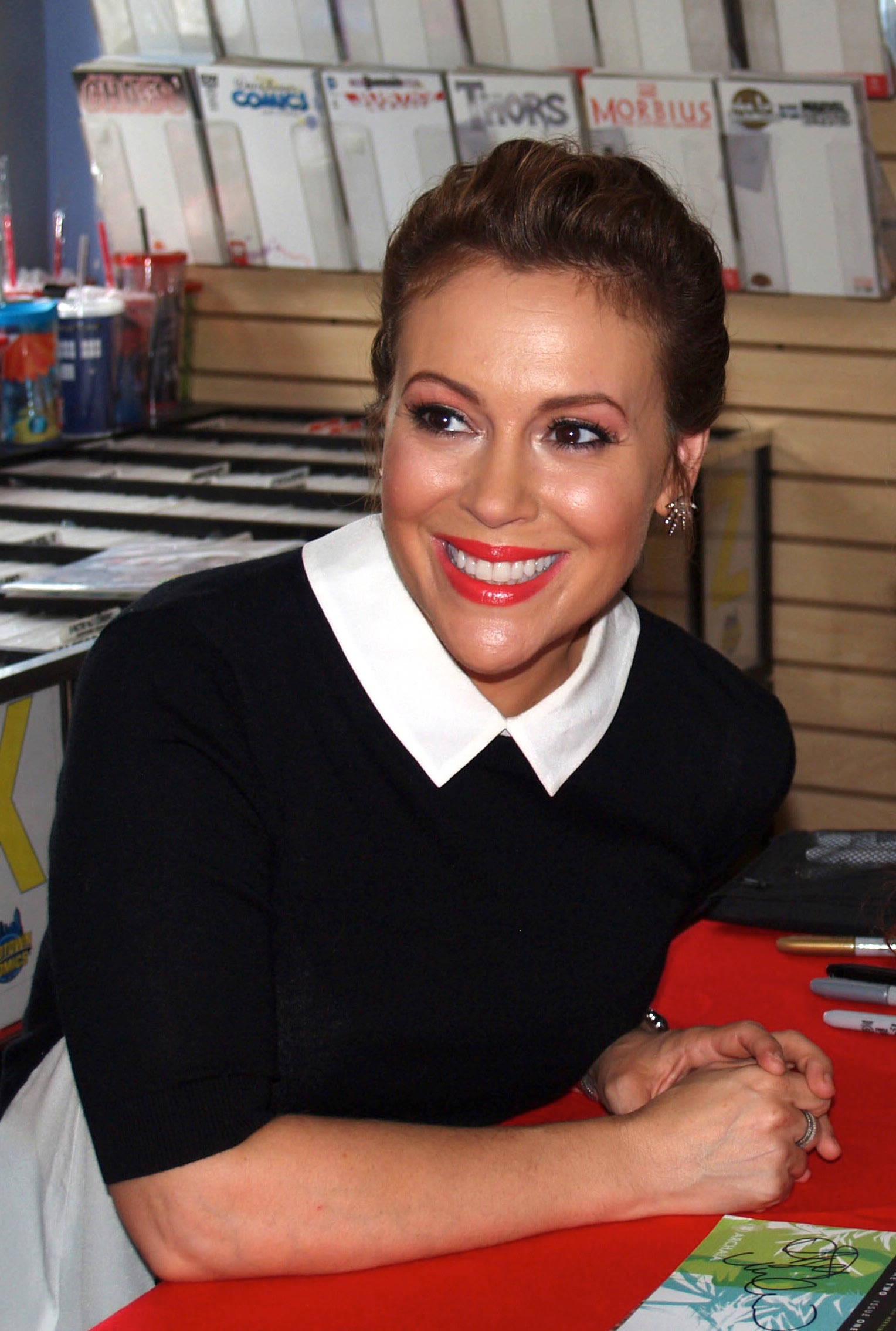
Alyssa Milano

- Betty Aberlin (born 1942) – children's television actress known for Mister Rogers' Neighborhood
- Frank Albanese (1931–2015) – actor known for playing mobsters, most notably "Uncle Pat" on The Sopranos
- Wail Alselwi (born 1989) – co-founder of Zack's Finest Deli & Grocery, best known for "Grades for Grabs program"
- Yancey Arias (born 1971) – actor
- Gerald Arpino (1923–2008) – dancer, choreographer, co-founder of the Joffrey Ballet
- Alexandra Barreto (born 1975) – actress in television and film
- Jedediah Bila (born 1979) – conservative television host; Wagner College valedictorian
- Mike Bocchetti (born 1961) – stand-up comedian and radio personality
- Patrick Breen (born 1960) – frequent television actor
- Kathy Brier (born 1975) – actress in television and musical theater
- Mickey Burns – television host and producer, best known for the celebrity interview show Profiles
- Syma Chowdhry (born 1980) – model and television reporter
- Eric Close (born 1967) – actor who plays Martin Fitzgerald on the CBS drama Without a Trace
- Sheena Colette – actress on Gossip Girl, White Collar; model in W magazine, Elle; graduated from St. Joseph by the Sea
- Pete Davidson (born 1993) – comedian, Saturday Night Live
- Drita D'Avanzo (born 1976) – reality television personality
- Laura Dean – choreographer known for whirling dances
- James DeMonaco (born 1969) – screenwriter, director and producer, best known for The Purge franchise
- Michael Drayer (born 1986) – actor, Mr. Robot, The Sopranos
- Selita Ebanks (born 1983) – Victoria's Secret model
- Rich Eisen (born 1969) – former ESPN host; current host for the NFL Network
- Frances Esemplare (1934–2017) – actress who played Nucci Gualtieri on The Sopranos
- Jennifer Esposito (born 1973) – actress, Spin City, Summer of Sam; attended Moore Catholic High School
- Emilio Estevez (born 1962) – actor; oldest son of Janet and Martin Sheen; born on Staten Island
- Christine Evangelista (born 1986) – actress; star of The Arrangement
- Robert Funaro (born 1959) – actor, The Sopranos, played Eugene Pontecorvo; lives in New Dorp
- Chris Galletta – screenwriter of The Kings of Summer
- Joe Gatto (born 1976) – comedian in The Tenderloins, featured on Impractical Jokers
- Gee Money (born 1968, Gary Euton) – radio and television personality and actor
- Buddy Giovinazzo (born 1957) – filmmaker and author, best known for Combat Shock and Life is Hot in Cracktown
- Carmine Giovinazzo (born 1973) – actor who plays Detective Danny Messer on the CBS drama CSI: NY; cousin of Buddy Giovinazzo and Larry Romano
- Jenn Graziano – executive producer of Staten Island-based reality TV show Mob Wives
- Renee Graziano (born 1970) – cast member of Mob Wives; sister of Jenn
- Dan Grimaldi (born 1946) – actor, The Sopranos' twins Philly and Patsy Parisi; former resident
- Vinny Guadagnino (born 1987) – of MTV's Jersey Shore; born and raised on Staten Island
- Patti Hansen (born 1956) – model; wife of The Rolling Stones' Keith Richards; graduated from Tottenville High School
- Melanie Iglesias (born 1987) – model and TV actress
- Skai Jackson (born 2002) - actress in TV
- Hassan Johnson (born 1976) – actor, featured in The Wire, Belly
- Rebekka Johnson – actress, best known for playing Dawn Rivecca on Netflix's wrestling comedy GLOW
- Colin Jost (born 1982) – comedian and writer, best known for Saturday Night Live
- Florina Kaja (born 1982) – socialite; TV personality; cast member of Season 4 of the reality television series Bad Girls Club
- Jon and Al Kaplan – musical parody writers, best known for Silence! The Musical
- Tim Kelleher – film, TV, and stage actor, writer, director; attended PS 35, OLGC and Msgr. Farrell
- Yunjin Kim (born 1973) – actress, Lost
- Sukanya Krishnan (born 1971) – news anchor; graduated from New Dorp High School
- John Lavelle (born 1981) – stage, film, and television actor
- Damien Leone (born 1982) – director and screenwriter of horror films including the Terrifier series
- Bob Levy (born 1962) – comedian and radio personality known as "The Reverend"
- Annette D'Agostino Lloyd (born 1962) – silent film historian
- Jeremy Luke (born 1978) – film and television actor
- Jon Lung – product designer, graphic designer and co-host of the TV series MythBusters
- Jamie Lynn Macchia (born 1991) – Miss New York 2015
- Larry Marshall (born 1943) – performer in musical theater and film
- Craig Mazin – screenwriter known for The Hangover sequels and Chernobyl miniseries
- Alyssa Milano (born 1972) – film and television actress, Who's the Boss?, Melrose Place, Charmed, Mistresses; raised on Staten Island
- Patty Mullen (born 1966) – actress and model; born and raised on Staten Island
- James Murray (born 1976) – comedian in The Tenderloins, featured on Impractical Jokers
- Julius R. Nasso (born 1952) – film producer, notably including 1990s association with Steven Seagal
- Garry Pastore (born 1961) – film and television actor; documentary director; brother of Eric Blackwood (musician) and cousin of Vincent Pastore
- Eddie Pepitone (born 1958) – actor and standup comedian
- Otto Petersen (1960–2014) – comedian and ventriloquist, known for his act "Otto and George"
- Angelina Pivarnick (born 1986) – former cast member of MTV's Jersey Shore seasons 1–2; born and raised on Staten Island
- Brian Quinn (born 1976) – comedian in The Tenderloins, featured on Impractical Jokers
- Robin Quivers (born 1952) – radio personality from The Howard Stern Show; lives on Staten Island
- Jack Radcliffe (born 1960, Frank Martini) – pornographic film actor
- Michael Rainey Jr. (born 2000) – actor, Power
- Angela Raiola (1960–2016) – Big Ang, star of Mob Wives
- Tony Reali (born 1978) – "Stat Boy" on Pardon the Interruption; host of Around the Horn on ESPN
- Greg Rikaart (born 1977) – television actor and Daytime Emmy winner, best known as Kevin Fisher from The Young and the Restless
- Pat Robertson (1930–2023) – TV personality and evangelist; found his interest in religion while living on Staten Island in the 1950s
- Larry Romano (born 1963) – actor, The King of Queens, NYPD Blue
- Vinny Vinesauce (born 1985) – Streamer, Vinesauce
- James Rosen (born 1968) – TV journalist; raised on Staten Island
- Theo Rossi (born 1975) – actor, Sons of Anarchy
- Ronen Rubinstein (born 1993) – actor, 9-1-1: Lone Star
- Gianni Russo (born 1943) – actor, played Carlo Rizzi in The Godfather; raised on Staten Island
- Joey Salads (born 1993, Joseph Saladino) – YouTube personality known for prank videos
- Glenn Scarpelli (born 1966) – child actor from One Day at a Time; son of comic book artist Henry Scarpelli
- Steve Schirripa (born 1957) – actor, producer, voice-over artist; Bobby Bacala from The Sopranos
- Ricky Schroder (born 1970) – TV and film actor, The Champ, Silver Spoons, NYPD Blue, 24, Strong Medicine
- Steven Seagal (born 1952) – actor, lived on Staten Island
- Brendan Sexton III (born 1980) – film and television actor
- Janet Sheen (born 1944) – actress and producer; she and Martin Sheen had first child Emilio Estevez while living in St. George
- Martin Sheen (born 1940, Ramón Estévez) – actor, best known for Apocalypse Now and The West Wing
- Peter Sollett (born 1976) – film director and screenwriter, known for Raising Victor Vargas and Nick & Norah's Infinite Playlist
- Michael "The Situation" Sorrentino (born 1982) – from MTV'S Jersey Shore; born on Staten Island
- Kevin Sussman (born 1970) – actor and comedian, known for Ugly Betty and The Big Bang Theory
- Chris Terrio (born 1976) – film director and screenwriter; won Academy Award for Argo screenplay
- Eddie Kaye Thomas (born 1980) – actor, Paul Finch in the American Pie movies; born and raised in New Dorp
- Jeff Trachta (born 1960) – TV actor, The Bold and the Beautiful, America's Got Talent
- Lenny Venito (born 1966) – actor, War of the Worlds
- Sal Vulcano (born 1976) – comedian in The Tenderloins, featured on Impractical Jokers
- Brian Whitman (born 1972) – radio host, impersonator, comedian
- Tristan Wilds (born 1989) – actor, The Wire, 90210; Grammy-nominated recording artist known as Mack Wilds
- Jeff Wittek (born 1989) – YouTube comedian
- Ben Younger (born 1972) – screenwriter and director of Boiler Room, Prime, Bleed for This

== Architects ==
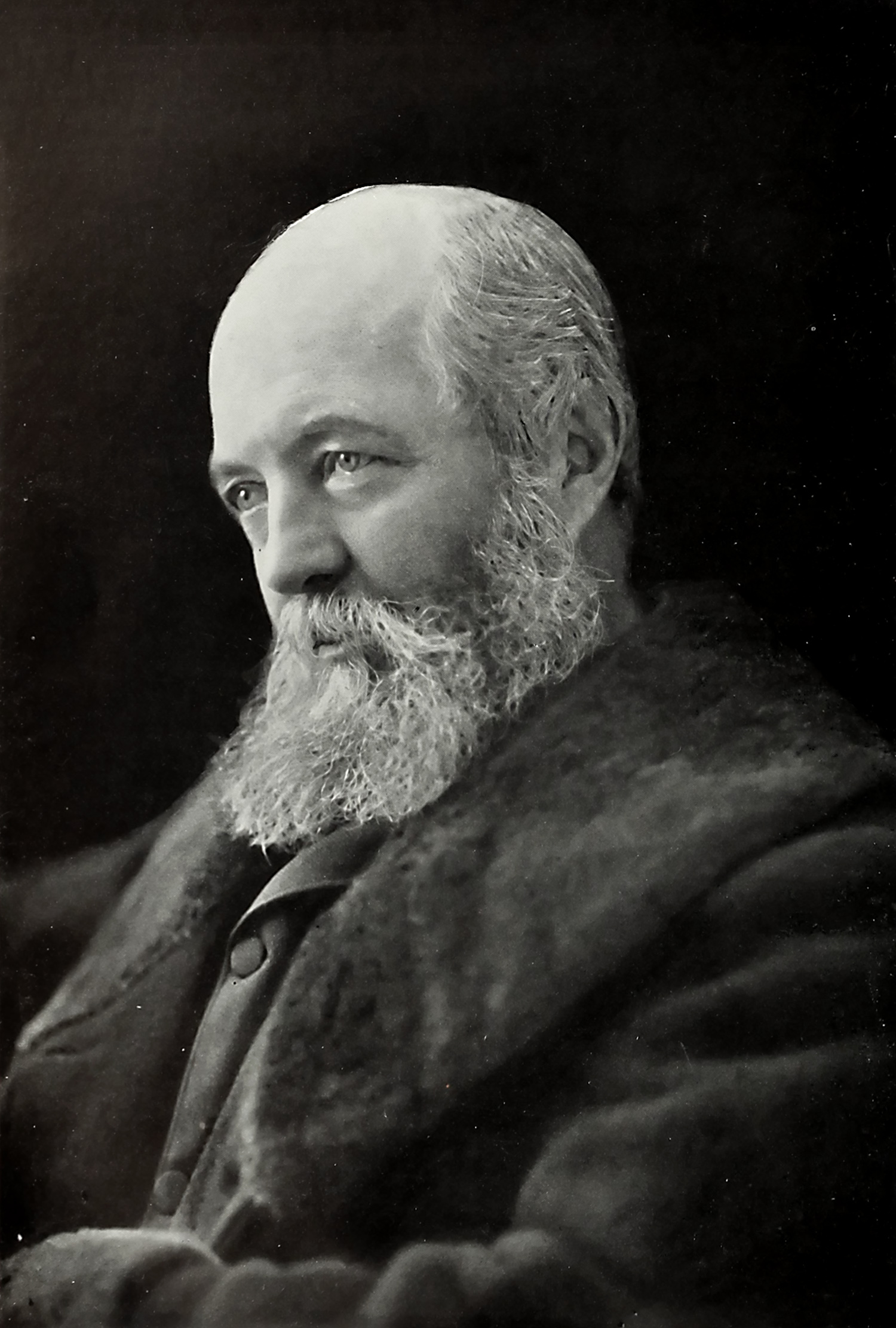
Frederick Law Olmsted

- Nathan Franklin Barrett (1845–1919) – landscape architect; co-founder and president of American Society of Landscape Architects
- John Merven Carrère (1858–1911) – designer of New York Public Library Main Branch and Staten Island Borough Hall; lived in Clifton
- Ernest Flagg (1857–1947) – designer of many commercial and residential buildings, including his estate on Todt Hill; brother-in-law of Charles Scribner II
- Daniel Paul Higgins (1886–1953) – designer of many prominent American buildings, especially for churches including his own St. Clare's in Great Kills
- Frederick Law Olmsted (1822–1903) – landscape architect known for Central Park and Brooklyn’s Prospect Park; lived in Annadale's Olmsted–Beil House
- Frederick Law Olmsted Jr. (1870–1957) – landscape architect known for national parks; son of Frederick Sr.
- John Charles Olmsted (1852–1920) – landscape architect known for urban parks; nephew and adopted son of Frederick Sr.
- Kenneth Olwig (b. 1946) – professor of Scandinavian landscape architecture
- Edward Sargent (1842–1914) – designer of many homes, schools and office buildings; Tompkinsville resident

== Artists ==
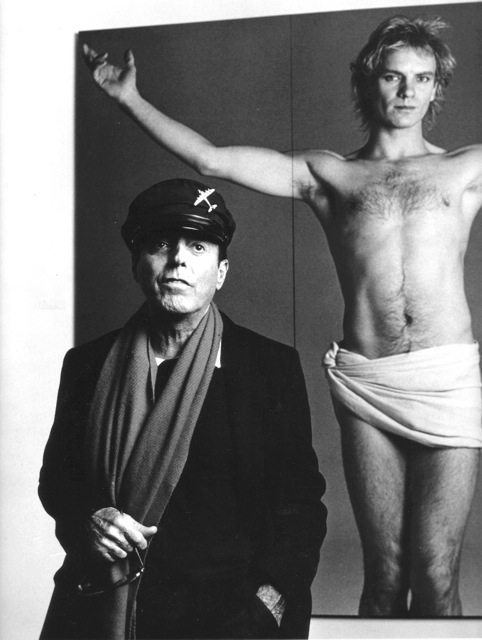
Francesco Scavullo

- Rocco Armento (1924–2011) – sculptor, born and raised in Staten Island
- Alice Austen (1866–1952) – pioneering photographer, lifelong Staten Island resident; the MV Alice Austen ferry is named after her
- Wallace Berman (1926–1976) – collage artist of the Beat movement
- Mathew Brady (1822–1896) – Civil War photographer; moved to Staten Island around 1850 with his wife Julia
- Alfred Thompson Bricher (1837–1908) – landscape painter associated with White Mountain art and the Hudson River School
- Mario Buatta (1935–2018) – interior decorator for large American homes; born in West Brighton; attended Curtis High School
- John Celardo (1918–2012) – illustrator of the Tarzan comic strip
- Ceil Chapman (1912–1979) – award-winning designer of fashion dresses
- Howard Chaykin (b. 1950) – comic book artist
- Cassius Marcellus Coolidge (1844–1934) – created Dogs Playing Poker; lived in Grasmere toward the end of his life
- Fred S. Cozzens (1846–1928) – maritime artist
- Jasper Francis Cropsey (1823–1900) – landscape painter of the Hudson River School; born on his family's farm in Rossville
- Edward DeGroff (1860–1910) – historic photographer and merchant in the District of Alaska
- Evan Dorkin (b. 1965) – cartoonist and creator of Milk & Cheese; longtime resident of Staten Island
- John Gossage (b. 1946) – photographer, noted for artist's books exploring the urban environment
- Percy Leason (1889–1959) – Australian-born painter, illustrator, and political cartoonist
- Grace Hamilton McIntyre (1878–1962) – painter of portrait miniatures
- P. Buckley Moss (1933–2024) – painter known for scenes of rural Virginia
- John A. Noble (1913–1983) – maritime lithographer and artist; a Staten Island Ferry was named after him
- Timothy H. O'Sullivan (c.1840–1882) – government photographer, prominent in frontier exploration and the Civil War
- William Page (1811–1885) – painter and portrait artist
- Jacques Reich (1852–1923) – portrait artist
- Mick Rock (born Michael Edward Chester Smith, 1948–2021) – photographer of rock music acts
- William Allen Rogers (1854–1931) – political cartoonist, including decades with Harper's Weekly and the New York Herald
- Henry Scarpelli (1930–2010) – artist for DC Comics and Archie Comics; father of actor Glenn Scarpelli
- Francesco Scavullo (1921–2004) – celebrity photographer; born on Staten Island
- Henry Fitch Taylor (1853–1925) – modernist painter
- Charles Tefft (1874–1951) – architectural sculptor
- Cynthia von Buhler (born Cynthia Carrozza, 1964) – artist and children's book author; Staten Island resident 2005–2008
- George Woodbridge (1930–2004) – illustrator for Mad magazine and history books; lived on Staten Island
- Sarah Yuster (b. 1957) – painter of landscapes and portraits

== Business, labor, philanthropy ==
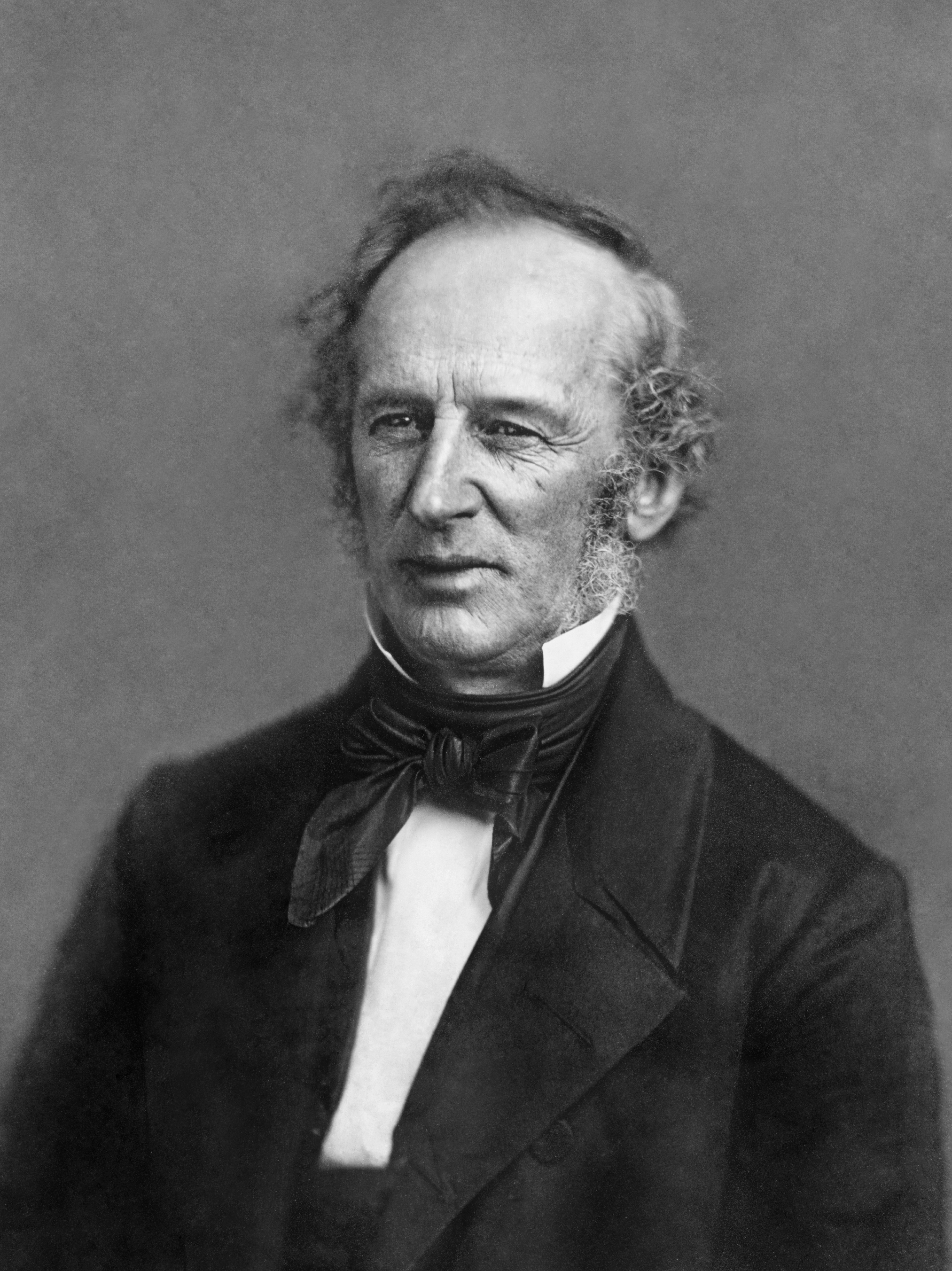
Cornelius Vanderbilt

- William Henry Aspinwall (1807–1875) – shipping magnate; co-founder of ASPCA and Metropolitan Museum; died at his country estate on Aspinwall Street in Tottenville
- William Bard (1778–1853) – founder of New York Life Insurance and Trust Company; namesake of Bard Avenue
- Ella Reeve Bloor (1862–1951) – labor organizer and socialist
- Roderick Cameron (1825–1900) – shipping executive and horse breeder
- Barbara Chernow – administrative leader for schools and universities
- Rufus King Delafield (1802–1874) – banker and cement manufacturer; namesake of Delafield Place
- W. Butler Duncan I (1830–1912) – Scottish-born banker; head of Mobile and Ohio Railroad
- John Eberhard Faber (1822–1879) – German-born manufacturer of pencils
- Joseph Giacomo Ferari (1868–1953) – lion tamer and circus owner at Dreamland on Coney Island
- James Clair Flood (1826–1889) – built a fortune from silver mining in Nevada's Comstock Lode
- Lisa Garcia Quiroz (1961–2018) – business executive at Time Warner
- Mott Green (born David Friedman, 1966–2013) – founder of the environmentally sustainable Grenada Chocolate Company
- William H. Friedland (1923–2018) – sociologist, labor activist and researcher
- Richard Guarasci (born 1946) – college administrator, including 18th president of Wagner College
- Baruch Herzfeld – provider of community webcasting and bicycling
- William Horrmann (1863–1927) – head of Rubsam & Horrmann Brewing Co.; built Horrmann Castle atop Grymes Hill
- Denis M. Hughes – president of NY AFL–CIO 1999–2011; member of NY Federal Reserve Board since 2003; born and raised on Staten Island
- Charles Wallace Hunt (1841–1911) – producer of coal-handling equipment
- James Jebbia (born 1963) – founder of Supreme, an international clothing brand and skateboard retailer
- George H. Kendall (c.1854–1924) – president of New York Bank Note Company that printed stock certificates
- Josephine Shaw Lowell (1843–1905) – co-founder of National Consumers League and other charities for women; sister of Colonel Robert Gould Shaw
- Oroondates Mauran (1791–1846) – owner of steamship and ferry operations
- John A. McMullen (born 1941) – senior advisor to corporate and government leaders
- John Mojecki (1865–1951) – Polish-born homebuilder and philanthropist
- Paul Montauk (1922–1998) – political and labor activist with the Socialist Workers Party
- Michael Mulgrew – president of United Federation of Teachers since 2009
- Ralph Munroe (1851–1933) – yacht designer and pioneering settler of Miami
- Samuel I. Newhouse (1927–2017) – billionaire co-owner of Advance Publications
- Eugenius Harvey Outerbridge (1860–1932) – fiberboard industrialist; co-founder of Richmond County Country Club; chairman of Port Authority; namesake of Outerbridge Crossing; brother of tennis pioneer Mary Ewing Outerbridge
- Edward Martineau Perine (1809–1905) – Alabama merchant and plantation owner; born on Staten Island and descended from Daniel Perrin, "The Huguenot"
- George Haven Putnam (1844–1930) – president of book publisher G. P. Putnam's Sons
- John Bishop Putnam (1849–1915) – treasurer and director of book publisher G. P. Putnam's Sons; brother of George Haven Putnam
- Louis Rossmann (born 1988) – repair technician and activist
- Bradhurst Schieffelin (1824–1909) – drugmaking and petroleum business; social activist
- Sarah Blake Sturgis Shaw (1815–1902) – abolitionist, women's rights supporter, philanthropist, mother of Robert Gould Shaw and Josephine Shaw Lowell
- Anson Phelps Stokes (1838–1913) – partner in family's Phelps Dodge Mining Company; his 10-acre mansion was next to Curtis High School; namesake of notable clergymen son and grandson
- Edith Minturn Stokes (1867–1937) – philanthropist, daughter of shipping magnate Robert Bowne Minturn Jr., daughter-in-law of mining executive Anson Phelps Stokes
- Van Toffler (b. 1960) – longtime MTV executive, rising to president of Viacom Media Networks Music Group 2008–2015
- Gustavus Trask (1836–1914) – sea captain; governor of Sailors' Snug Harbor
- Vanderbilt family – wealthy Dutch-American railroad owners and heirs, including many 19th-century Staten Island residents and the church-sized Vanderbilt Mausoleum in New Dorp's Moravian Cemetery
  - Cornelius Vanderbilt (1794–1877) – shipping and railroad magnate; wealthiest person in America; born and lived on Staten Island; father-in-law of local politician Nicholas B. La Bau
  - Cornelius Vanderbilt II (1843–1899) – railroad magnate; son of William Henry Vanderbilt
  - Cornelius Vanderbilt IV (1898–1974) – newspaper publisher, author, film producer; grandson of Cornelius Vanderbilt II
  - Cornelius Jeremiah Vanderbilt (1830–1882) – troubled son of Cornelius Vanderbilt
  - Eliza Osgood Vanderbilt Webb (1860–1936) – founder of Shelburne Farms in Vermont; daughter of William Henry Vanderbilt
  - Emily Thorn Vanderbilt (1852–1946) – philanthropist; founder of Sloane Hospital for Women; daughter of William Henry Vanderbilt; great-great-grandmother of Timothy Olyphant
  - Florence Adele Vanderbilt Twombly (1854–1952) – known for building elaborate homes; daughter of William Henry Vanderbilt
  - Frank Armstrong Crawford Vanderbilt (1839–1885) – second wife of Cornelius Vanderbilt; persuaded him to fund Tennessee's Vanderbilt University
  - Frederick William Vanderbilt (1856–1938) – railroad executive; son of William Henry Vanderbilt
  - George Washington Vanderbilt II or III (1862–1914) – born in New Dorp; built North Carolina's Biltmore Estate; son of William Henry Vanderbilt
  - Margaret Louisa Vanderbilt Shepard (1845–1924) – founder of YWCA hotel; daughter of William Henry Vanderbilt
  - Reginald Claypoole Vanderbilt (1880–1925) – founder of many equestrian organizations; son of Cornelius Vanderbilt II; father of Gloria Vanderbilt; grandfather of Anderson Cooper
  - William Henry Vanderbilt (1821–1885) – railroad magnate and philanthropist; wealthiest person in America; son of Cornelius Vanderbilt
  - William Kissam Vanderbilt (1849–1920) – railroad executive; horse breeder; son of William Henry Vanderbilt
- Arthur von Briesen (1843–1920) – lawyer, philanthropist, president of Legal Aid Society; estate became Von Briesen Park next to Fort Wadsworth
- Erastus Wiman (1834–1904) – president of the Staten Island Railway Co. and the St. George Ferry

== Crime ==
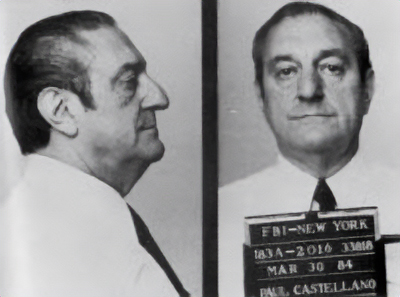
Paul Castellano

- Richard Biegenwald (1940–2008) – serial killer who murdered at least six people in New Jersey
- Thomas Bilotti (1940–1985) – underboss of Gambino crime family; was assassinated with Paul Castellano
- Frank Cali (1965–2019) – Gambino crime boss who had close ties to Sicily
- Anthony Capo (1959/1960–2012) – hitman for DeCavalcante crime family; government informant
- Stephen Caracappa (1941–2017) – former detective convicted of eight murders for the Gambino and Lucchese crime families
- Paul Castellano (1915–1985) – Gambino crime boss; lived on Todt Hill; buried in Moravian Cemetery in an unmarked grave
- Frank Coppa (1941–2024) – Bonnano caporegime and government informant
- William Cutolo (1949–1999) – Colombo underboss; buried in Cemetery of the Resurrection nine years after his murder
- Frank DeCicco (1935–1986) – Gambino underboss
- Aniello Dellacroce (1914–1985) – Gambino underboss; lived in Grasmere, Staten Island
- Michael DiLeonardo (b. 1955) – Gambino caporegime and government informant
- James Failla (1919–1999) – senior caporegime with the Gambino crime family
- Gus Farace (1960–1989) – associate of Bonanno crime family; murdered a teenager and a federal agent
- Eddie Garafola (1938–2020) – Gambino caporegime; brother-in-law of Sammy Gravano
- Sammy "The Bull" Gravano (b. 1945) – Gambino underboss and government informant
- Anthony Graziano (1940–2019) – consigliere of Bonanno crime family
- Joseph Masella (c.1948–1998) – associate of DeCavalcante crime family
- Frank Matthews (b. 1944) – major trafficker of heroin and cocaine
- James McBratney (1941–1973) – armed robber and suspected kidnapper; killed by crew that included John Gotti
- Xhevdet Mustafa (1940–1982) – failed assassin of the leader of communist Albania
- "Staten Island Ninja" – serial burglar, possibly deported to Albania, never positively identified
- Therese Patricia Okoumou – immigrant rights activist, known for climbing the Statue of Liberty and the Eiffel Tower
- Chris Paciello (born Christian Ludwigsen, 1971) – affiliate of Bonanno, Colombo, Gambino crime families; government informant
- Andre Rand (born Frank Rushan) (b. 1944) – convicted kidnapper of two children; suspected serial killer
- George Remini (1945–2007) – member of Gambino crime family
- Richard Rogers (b. 1950) – convicted murderer of two men; suspected serial killer
- Gregory Scarpa (1928–1994) – hitman for Colombo crime family
- Anthony Spero (1929–2008) – consigliere of Bonanno crime family
- Joseph Vollaro (b. 1966) – Gambino associate and government informant
- Ronell Wilson (b. 1982) – convicted killer of two undercover detectives
- John Zancocchio (b. 1957) – consigliere of Bonanno crime family

== Historical notables and early settlers ==
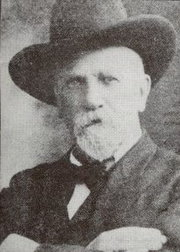
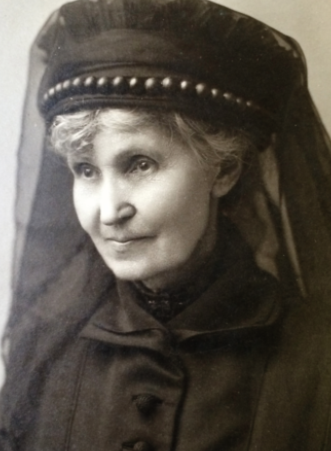
Jeremiah and Mary Jane O'Donovan Rossa
- Pierre Billiou (c.1632–c.1702) – early settler, founder of Old Town
- David Pietersz. de Vries (c.1593–1655) – Dutch explorer and early settler
- Mamie Fish (1853–1915) – New York socialite and one of the so-called Triumvirate of American Gilded Age society
- Peter Fisher (1782–1848) – historian of colonial New Brunswick, Canada; born on Staten Island
- Loring McMillen (1906–1991) – official historian of Staten Island; founder of Historic Richmond Town
- Cornelis Melyn (1600–c.1662) – early settler, political figure, and Patroon
- Jeremiah O'Donovan Rossa (1831–1915) and Mary Jane O'Donovan Rossa (1845–1916) – husband-and-wife activists for Irish independence; ancestors of politician Jerome X. O'Donovan and writer William Rossa Cole
- Daniel Perrin (1642–1719) – early settler known as "The Huguenot"

== Inventors ==
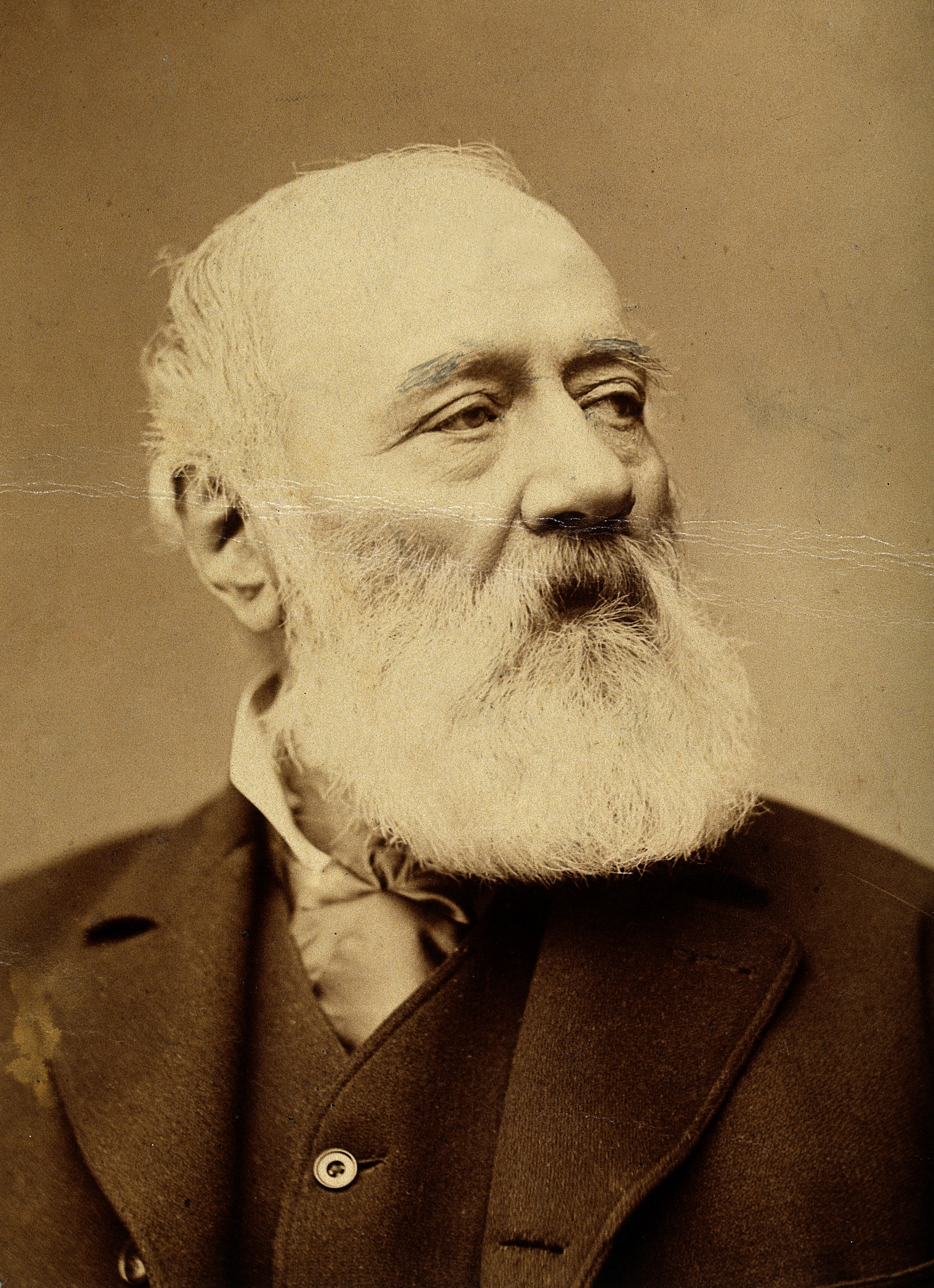
Antonio Meucci

- Thomas Adams (1818–1905) – inventor of modern chewing gum; William Wrigley Jr. associate; Island resident in the 1860s–1870s
- Albert Baez (1912–2007) – co-inventor of X-ray microscope; father of folk singer Joan Baez
- Charles Goodyear (1800–1860) – inventor of vulcanized rubber; lived on Staten Island for several years in the 1830s
- Jerome H. Lemelson (1923–1997) – inventor of many electronic technologies; holder of 605 patents
- Gustav A. Mayer (1845–1918) – inventor of the Nilla wafer; lived in a mansion that still stands in New Dorp
- Antonio Meucci (1808–1889) – developed a voice-communication apparatus that several sources credit as the first telephone; immigrated in 1850, settled in the Clifton area
- Frederick Walton (1834–1928) – built first American linoleum factory in "Linoleumville", today's Travis
- Charles Rudolph Wittemann (1884–1967) – aviation pioneer; built the world's first airplane factory on Staten Island; co-founded Teterboro Airport

== Military and government ==
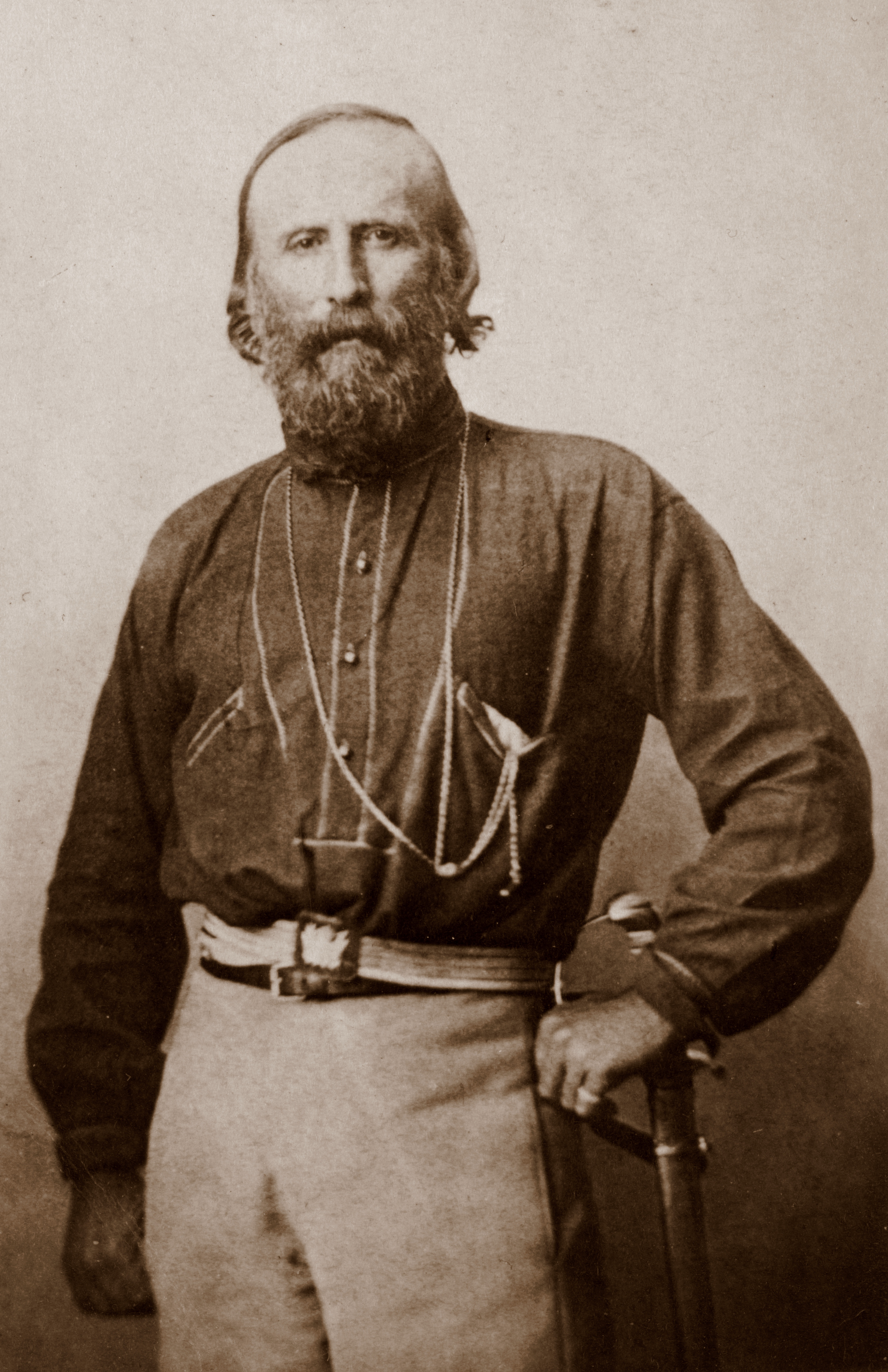
Giuseppe Garibaldi

- Donald Armstrong (1889–1984) – brigadier general in the US Army during World War II
- Mohamed Bahi (b. 1984) – chief liaison of Mayor Eric Adams to the Muslim community 2022–2024; convicted in connection with campaign contributions
- Richard Bayley (1745–1801) – first health officer of the Port of New York, in charge of Staten Island quarantine station; father of Elizabeth Ann Bayley Seton; grandfather of James Roosevelt Bayley
- Taylor G. Belcher (1920–1990) – United States ambassador to Cyprus and Peru
- Edward Clyde Benfold (1931–1952) – US Navy hospital corpsman killed in the Korean War; Medal of Honor recipient
- Andrew E. K. Benham (1832–1905) – admiral, United States Navy
- Christopher Billop (c.1738–1827) – British Loyalist colonel during the American Revolution; Staten Island home was the landmark Conference House
- Christopher Billopp (c.1638–1726) – English naval officer; great-grandfather of Christopher Billop; Staten Island home became the Conference House
- Vincent R. Capodanno (1929–1967) – chaplain and lieutenant in US Navy; Medal of Honor recipient; Maryknoll Catholic priest and candidate for sainthood
- Salvatore Cassano (b. 1945) – New York City Fire Commissioner 2010–2014
- John J. Cisco (1806–1884) – assistant treasurer of the United States for three presidents
- Marcia Clark (b. 1953) – prosecutor in the O. J. Simpson trial; graduated from Susan E. Wagner High School; lived in Manor Heights
- Ichabod Crane (1787–1857) – military officer for 48 years; nominal inspiration for the fictional protagonist in The Legend of Sleepy Hollow; buried in Staten Island
- Thomas D. Doubleday (1816–1864) – Wall Street merchant; Colonel in Civil War; lived in Port Richmond; brother of Abner Doubleday
- Trevor N. Dupuy (1916–1995) – US Army colonel; prominent military historian
- Sara Ehrman (1919–2017) – senior aide to national Democratic Party politicians
- Fred Espenak (b. 1953) – NASA scientist, eclipse expert; born and educated on Staten Island
- Giuseppe Garibaldi (1807–1882) – Italian revolutionary, statesman and general, best known for leading the successful military campaign for Italian unification; lived for a time on Staten Island
- Eric Garner (1970–2014) – former NYC Parks employee, fatally choked by police while being arrested for unlicensed cigarettes
- Paul C. Genereux (b. 1950) – US Army brigadier general
- Irving Hale (1861–1930) – brigadier general who served in the Philippines during the Spanish–American War
- Maura Harty – United States Assistant Secretary of State for Consular Affairs
- Louis V. Iasiello (b. 1950) – rear admiral; Chief of Navy Chaplains 2003–2006; Franciscan Catholic priest
- Patrick Henry Jones (1830–1900) – Civil War brigadier general; Postmaster of New York City
- Thomas Jordan (1819–1895) – Civil War general and author
- Andrew Juxon-Smith (1931–1996) – head of Sierra Leone military government 1967–1968
- Lewis A. Kaplan (b. 1944) – US District Court judge in New York
- Robert Kibbee (1921–1982) – chancellor of the City University of New York; son of actor Guy Kibbee
- Robert S. Lasnik (b. 1941) – US District Court judge in Washington state
- James E. Leonard – chief of New York City Fire Department 2014–2019
- Cecil B. Lyon (1903–1993) – US ambassador to Chile, Sri Lanka, and the Maldives
- Jeb Stuart Magruder (1934–2014) – Staten Island native; Watergate figure in Nixon White House; Presbyterian minister
- John Marburger (1941–2011) – director of Brookhaven National Laboratory; science advisor to President George W. Bush
- Francis Xavier McQuade (1878–1955) – New York City judge; advocate for Sunday baseball; part-owner of New York Giants
- Angel Mendez (1946–1967) – US Marine awarded the Navy Cross for his death in Vietnam War; raised at Mount Loretto
- Joseph F. Merrell (1926–1945) – Medal of Honor recipient in World War II
- Mersereau Ring – Staten Island family that supported the American Revolution with extensive spying activities, 1776–1781
- Ed Murphy (b. 1945) – peace and labor activist; organizer of Vietnam Veterans Against the War and the Workforce Development Institute
- Robert Nelson (1794–1873) – physician; general of Canadian army rebelling unsuccessfully against British colonial rule
- Joe Pistone (b. 1939) – FBI agent, best known as Donnie Brasco; lived in Staten Island for a brief period
- Joseph Rallo – leader of public universities; Commissioner of Higher Education for Louisiana
- Muhamed Sacirbey (b. 1956) – Bosnian diplomat
- Louis N. Scarcella (b. 1951) – NYPD homicide detective involved in 21 overturned convictions
- Les Schneider (b. 1939) – US Air Force pilot, known for Gemini 8 rescue mission
- Robert Gould Shaw (1837–1863) – colonel who headed the Union Army's first African American regiment, subject of the feature film Glory
- Richard Sheirer (1946–2012) – senior official in NYC Fire Department, Police Department, and Office of Emergency Management
- Edward Stettinius Jr. (1900–1949) – chairman of US Steel; Secretary of State in FDR Administration; former home is now Staten Island Academy
- Gustav Struve (1805–1870) – German journalist and revolutionary; American Civil War captain
- George Augustus Vaughn Jr. (1897–1989) – World War I flying ace; co-founder of Vaughn College of Aeronautics and Technology
- Katherine Walker (1848–1931) – keeper of Robbins Reef Light in New York Harbor; helped rescue more than 50 sailors
- Theodore Winthrop (1828–1861) – one of the first Union officers killed in the American Civil War
- James Zappalorti (1945–1990) – disabled veteran of the Vietnam War; victim of anti-gay murder

== Musicians ==
=== Past ===
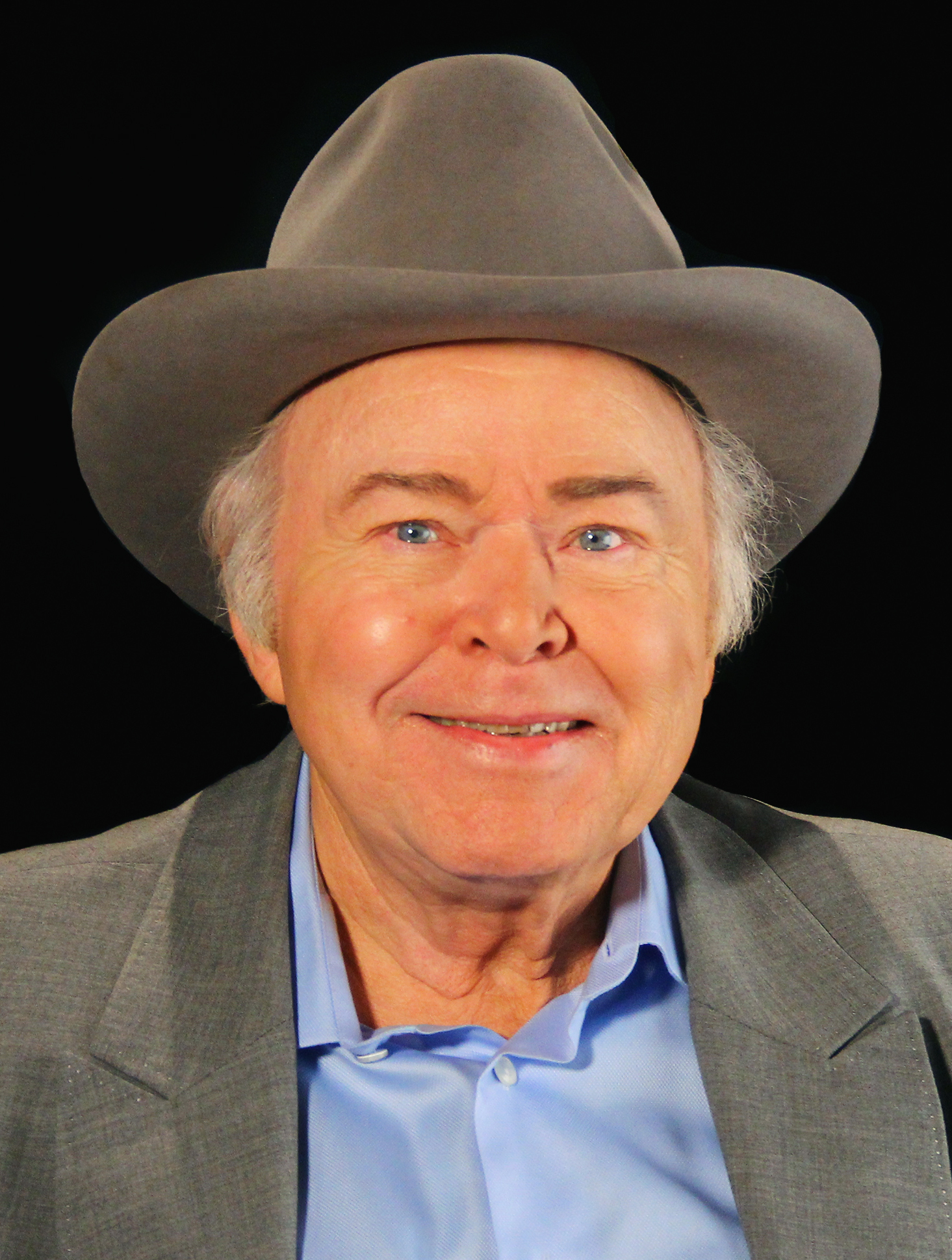
Roy Clark

- Roy Clark (1933–2018) – country music performer; co-host of the television show Hee Haw; spent his early years on Staten Island
- Bobby Darin (born Walden Robert Cassotto, 1936–1973) – singer; his family had a summer home as a child in South Beach, Staten Island
- The Elegants – had #1 hit record in 1959, "Little Star", recorded in a South Beach studio
- Vincent Fanelli (1883–1966) – principal harpist of Philadelphia Orchestra and Kalamazoo Symphony Orchestra
- Eileen Farrell (1920–2002) – singer of classical and popular music; lived on Emerson Hill and Grymes Hill
- Force MDs – vocal group; several members were born and raised on Staten Island
- Bobby Gustafson (b. 1965) – guitarist best known for the heavy metal band Overkill
- Bill Hughes (1930–2018) – jazz trombonist and bandleader with the Count Basie Orchestra
- Frankie LaRocka (1954–2005) – drummer and producer; played for Bryan Adams and Jon Bon Jovi; born and raised in South Beach
- Q Lazzarus (born Diana Luckey, 1960–2022) – singer known for "Goodbye Horses", featured in the films Married to the Mob and The Silence of the Lambs
- Carl Lesch (1924–1983) – music director and educator for Catholic churches and schools
- Antoine "T.C.D." Lundy (1963–1998) – singer-songwriter with the Force MDs
- Max Maretzek (1821–1897) – opera director and composer
- Galt MacDermot (1928–2018) – musician and lyricist for musicals such as Hair and The Two Gentlemen of Verona
- Patricia Neway (1919–2012) – operatic soprano and musical theater actress; won a Tony Award for The Sound of Music
- A.J. Pero (1959–2015) – drummer for Twisted Sister
- Charles Seeger (1886–1979) – musicologist in family of folk music specialists Ruth, Peggy, Mike, and Pete Seeger; brother of poet Alan Seeger
- George Siravo (1916–2000) – saxophonist for Glenn Miller; orchestrator for Tony Bennett, Doris Day, Frank Sinatra
- Axel Stordahl (1913–1963) – music director for hundreds of Frank Sinatra songs
- Roland Trogan (1933–2012) – classical composer; lived on Staten Island
- UMC's – 1990s hip-hop duo of Haas G and Kool Kim
- Cherry Vanilla (born Kathleen Dorritie, 1943) – singer and publicist, including for David Bowie and Vangelis
- Chuck Wayne (born Charles Jagelka, 1923–1997) – jazz guitarist with Woody Herman, George Shearing, and Tony Bennett
- Dirty Looks – 1980s power-pop trio signed o Stiff / Epic Records consisted of Staten Island musicians singer/guitarist Patrick Barnes, drummer Peter Parker Minucci, and bassist Marco Sin

=== Recent ===
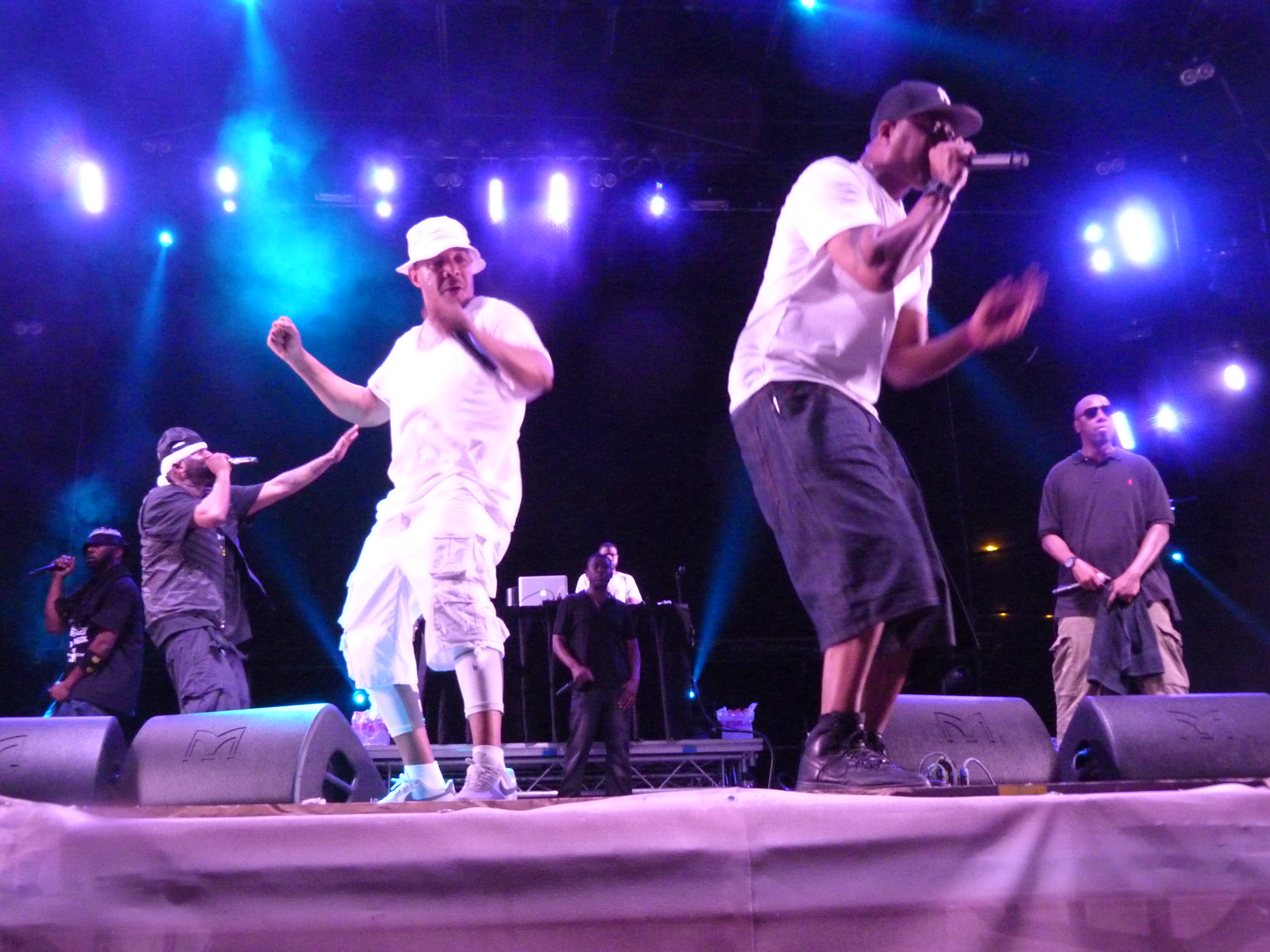
Wu-Tang Clan

- 9th Prince (born Terrance Hamlin, 1977) – co-founder of rap group Killarmy; brother of Wu-Tang Clan co-founder RZA
- Christina Aguilera (born 1980) – Mouseketeer; pop singer; judge on NBC's The Voice; born on Staten Island
- Steve Augeri (born 1959) – former lead singer of the rock band Journey
- Joan Baez (born 1941) – folk singer and activist; born on Staten Island; daughter of inventor and Wagner College professor Albert Baez
- Eric Blackwood (born Eric Pastore, 1968) – guitarist and singer-songwriter for Edison's Children; brother of actor Garry Pastore and cousin of Vincent Pastore
- Vito Bratta (born 1961) – guitarist for White Lion; lives on Staten Island
- Cappadonna (born Darryl Hill, 1969) – rapper, Wu-Tang Clan member; born and raised on Staten Island
- Richie Castellano (born 1980) – musician for Blue Öyster Cult
- Lenny Cerzosie – lead singer of Staten Island hard rock band The Infinite Staircase
- Ron Dante (born 1945) – lead singer for The Archies; number 1 song "Sugar, Sugar"
- Mark Delpriora – classical guitarist and composer; born and raised on Staten Island
- Trife Diesel (born Theo Bailey, 1980) – rapper affiliated with Wu-Tang Clan
- Eamon Doyle (born 1983) – rapper; born and raised on Staten Island
- Anthony Esposito – former bassist for Lynch Mob and Ace Frehley; film producer; born on Staten Island
- Frankee (born Nicole Francine Aiello, 1983) – R&B singer-songwriter
- Reeves Gabrels (born 1956) – rock guitarist and songwriter with David Bowie, Tin Machine, and The Cure
- Sandy Gennaro (born 1951) – drummer; raised in South Beach; played with Cyndi Lauper, Joan Jett, The Monkees and Pat Travers
- Ghostface Killah (born Dennis Coles, 1970) – rapper, Wu-Tang Clan member; born and raised on Staten Island
- Billy Graziadei (born 1969) – guitarist and lead singer for rap-rock band Biohazard
- GZA (born Gary E. Grice, 1966) – rapper, Wu-Tang Clan founding member
- Haas G (born Carlos Evans, 1971) – rapper also known as Fantom of the Beat, half of the 1990s duo The UMC's
- Hanz On (born Anthony Messado, 1974) – rapper affiliated with Wu-Tang Clan
- Inspectah Deck (born Jason Hunter, 1970) – rapper; Wu-Tang Clan member
- David Johansen (born 1950) – (also known as Buster Poindexter) of the New York Dolls
- Matt U Johnson (born 1992) – rapper
- Blackie Lawless (born Steven Duren, 1956) – lead singer of the 1980s heavy metal band W.A.S.P.
- Lil Suzy (born Suzanne Casale Melone, 1979) – freestyle singer
- DJ Megatron (born Corey McGriff, 1978–2011) – hip-hop DJ on radio and television
- Method Man (born Clifford M. Smith, 1971) – rapper; Wu-Tang Clan member; born in Hempstead, Long Island, and raised on Staten Island
- Ingrid Michaelson (born 1979) – Indie-pop singer/songwriter; a Staten Island Technical High School graduate
- Robert Mosci (born Robert Moskowitz – jazz pianist and singer at Bemelmans Bar and other clubs in New York City
- Kevin Norton (born 1956) – jazz and contemporary percussionist, composer, teacher
- NYOIL (born Kim Sharpton, 1971) – rapper also known as Kool Kim, half of the 1990s duo The UMC's
- Jeannine Otis – singer and theater professional
- David Park (born 1983) – rap producer and recording engineer
- Vito Picone (born 1941) – with The Elegants, recorded #1 hit of 1959, "Little Star", in South Beach
- John Pisano (1931–2024) – jazz guitarist, including long collaborations with Herb Alpert, Peggy Lee, Joe Pass
- PS22 Chorus – prominent elementary-school chorus located in Graniteville; performed at the 83rd Academy Awards
- Raekwon (born Corey Woods, 1970) – rapper, Wu-Tang Clan member; born in Brooklyn, raised on Staten Island
- Vernon Reid (born 1958) – guitar player for Living Colour
- Remedy (born Ross Filler, 1972) – rapper affiliated with Wu-Tang Clan
- Bebe Rexha (born 1989) – singer-songwriter, grew up on Staten Island
- Keith Richards (born 1943) – Rolling Stones guitarist; his wife Patti Hansen was from Staten Island; in the 1980s they owned a home on the South Shore
- Rockell (born Rachel Alexandra Mercaldo, 1977) – freestyle pop singer
- Daniel Rodriguez (born 1964) – operatic tenor known as "The Singing Policeman" for his former work in NYPD's Ceremonial Unit
- RZA (born Robert Fitzgerald Diggs, 1969) – rapper, Wu-Tang Clan founding member, Grammy Award-winning producer
- Shyheim (born Shyheim Dionel Franklin, 1979) – rapper affiliated with Wu-Tang Clan
- Gene Simmons (born Chaim Witz, later Eugene Klein, 1949) – Kiss bass player; attended Richmond College
- Earl Slick (born 1952) – guitarist, Phantom, Rocker and Slick; played with John Lennon
- Peter Steele (born Peter Ratajczyk, 1962–2010) – lead singer and bassist for the gothic metal band Type O Negative
- Steve Stoll (born Stephen Stollmeyer) – drummer and techno producer
- Streetlife (born Patrick Charles, 1972) – rapper affiliated with Wu-Tang Clan
- Kasim Sulton (born 1955) – bass player for Utopia, with Joan Jett and the Blackhearts; now a member of The New Cars
- Ron "Bumblefoot" Thal (born Ronald Blumenthal, 1969) – guitar player for Guns N' Roses, raised in Bay Terrace
- U-God (born Lamont Jody Hawkins, 1970) – rapper, Wu-Tang Clan member; born in Brooklyn, moved to Staten Island as a youth
- Buz Verno (1953–2020) – bass guitarist, including for fellow Staten Islanders David Johansen and Cherry Vanilla
- Kenny Washington (b. 1958) – jazz drummer
- White Lion – hard rock band
- Rusty Willoughby (b. 1966) – rock musician in the Seattle area since the 1980s
- Wu-Tang Clan – influential hip-hop group; most of its founding members were from Staten Island; credited with giving Staten Island the nickname "Shaolin"

== Politicians ==
=== Past ===
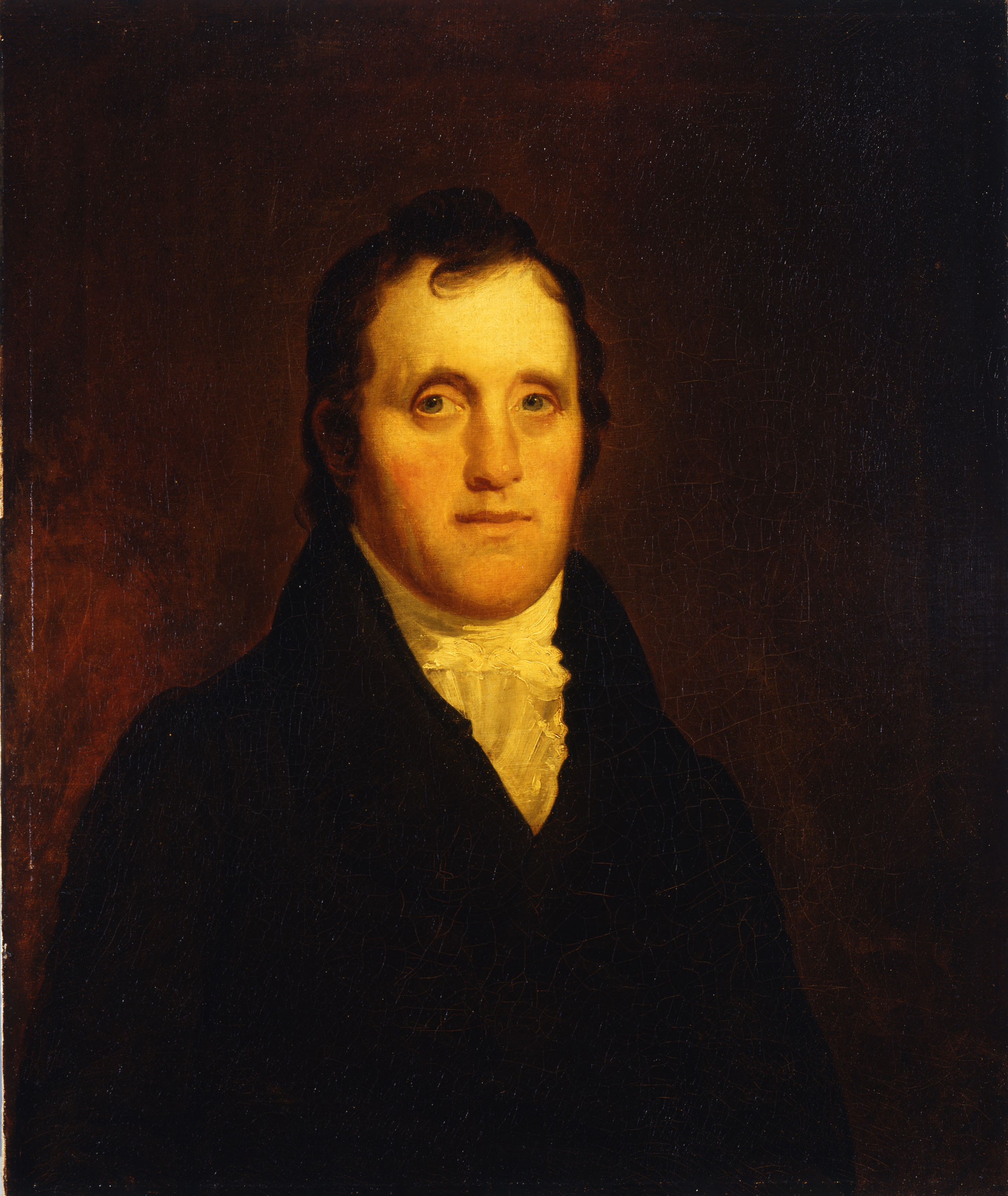
Daniel D. Tompkins
- Eugenio Alvarez (1918–1976) – NY State Assembly 1973–1974
- Edward J. Amann Jr. (1925–2009) – NY State Assembly 1953–1973
- Robert S. Bainbridge (1913–1959) – NY State Senate 1943–1946
- Samuel Barton (1785–1858) – US House of Representatives 1835–1837
- Howard R. Bayne (1851–1933) – lawyer, historian, member of NY State Senate
- Obadiah Bowne (1822–1874) – member of 32nd US Congress and a presidential elector
- James A. Bradley (1830–1921) – New Jersey politician; founder of Asbury Park and Bradley Beach
- John M. Braisted Jr. (1907–1997) – NY State Senate 1948–1952; district attorney 1956–1975
- Erastus Brooks (1815–1886) – NY State Senate 1854–1857, NY State Assembly 1878–1883
- John Broome (1738–1810) – NY State Assembly 1800–1802, NY State Senate 1804, NY Lieutenant Governor 1804–1810
- Ellsworth B. Buck (1892–1970) – US House of Representatives 1944–1948; opposed development of Fresh Kills Landfill
- Aaron Burr (1756–1836) – third US vice president; known for duel with Alexander Hamilton; died in Port Richmond
- Thomas Child Jr. (1818–1869) – US House of Representatives 1855–1857, NY State Assembly, town supervisor of Northfield, Staten Island
- Robert Christie Jr. (1824–1875) – NY State Assembly, NY State Senate
- Elizabeth Connelly (1928–2006) – NY State Assembly 1973–2000; first woman to win elective office in Staten Island
- Robert T. Connor (1919–2009) – borough president 1966–1977
- Henry Crocheron (1772–1819) – member of 14th US Congress
- Jacob Crocheron (1774–1849) – member of 21st US Congress, brother of Henry
- George Cromwell (1860–1934) – businessman, lawyer, NY State Assembly and Senate, first borough president of Staten Island
- Harman B. Cropsey (c.1775–1859) – Richmond County Sheriff 1829–1831, NY State Senate 1832–1835; uncle of artist Jasper Francis Cropsey
- Edward V. Curry (1909–1982) – NY State Assembly 1949–1952, NY State Senate 1955–1956, NY City Council 1958–1978
- John Decker (1823–1892) – NY State Assembly; the last chief engineer of New York's Volunteer Fire Department
- Johannes de Decker (1626–?) – comptroller of New Amsterdam; negotiated 1664 colonial surrender to the British
- Thomas Dongan (1634–1715) – governor of NY Province; namesake of Dongan Hills
- William Duer (1805–1879) – NY State Assembly; district attorney; US House of Representatives
- Joseph Egbert (1807–1888) – US House of Representatives 1841–1843
- Rae L. Egbert (1891–1964) – NY State Senate 1935–1940; descendant of the farming family for which Egbertville is named
- Daniel D. T. Farnsworth (1819–1892) – president of West Virginia Senate; second Governor of West Virginia
- Edward E. Fitzgibbon (1847–1909) – Wisconsin State Assembly; born on Staten Island
- Frank Fossella (1925–2014) – NY City Council 1985; uncle of Vito
- Albert Jennings Fountain (1838–1896) – Texas Senate; New Mexico House of Representatives
- John C. Fremont (1813–1890) – Civil War major general; first senator from California; first Republican Party nominee for president; governor of the Territory of Arizona
- Samuel H. Frost (1818–c.1874) – town supervisor of Westfield, Staten Island 1851–1856; NY State Senate 1870–1871
- Anthony Gaeta (1927–1988) – borough president 1977–1984
- James J. Galdieri (1896–1944) – Jersey City politician
- James Guyon Jr. (1778–1846) – member of NY State Assembly and 16th US Congress
- Nelson H. Henry (1855–1923) – member of NY State Assembly, Adjutant General of New York
- Robert E. Johnson (1909–1995) – NY State Senate 1941–1942, 1947
- Abraham Jones (1725–1792) – member of 1st NY State Assembly 1777–1778; expelled and imprisoned for British Loyalist activity
- David D. Kpormakpor (1935–2010) – Liberian law professor, Supreme Court justice, head of state 1994–1995
- Nicholas B. La Bau (1823–1873) – NY State Assembly; NY State Senate; son-in-law of Cornelius Vanderbilt
- Ralph J. Lamberti (1934–2025) – borough president 1984–1989
- Nicholas LaPorte (1926–1990) – NY City Council 1977–1985; deputy borough president 1985–1989
- Robert Lindsay (1895/1896–1972) – NY City Council 1964–1972
- Francis Lovelace (c.1621–1675) – second governor of NY Province; purchased Staten Island from Native Americans and built farm
- John A. Lynch (1882–1954) – NY State Senate; borough president 1922–1933
- Caleb Lyon (1822–1875) – NY State Assembly; NY State Senate; US House of Representatives; governor of the Territory of Idaho
- Albert V. Maniscalco (1908–1998) – NY State Assembly; NY City Council; borough president 1954–1965
- Charles J. McCormack (1865–1915) – NY State Assembly 1903; Richmond County sheriff 1904–1907; borough president 1914–1915
- Henry B. Metcalfe (1805–1881) – district attorney; county judge; US House of Representatives 1875–1877
- S. Robert Molinari (1897–1957) – NY State Assembly 1943–1944; father of Guy; grandfather of Susan
- Nicholas Muller (1836–1917) – NY State Assembly 1875–1876; US House of Representatives for 12 years during 1877–1902
- James J. Murphy (1898–1962) – US House of Representatives 1949–1952; NY City Council 1954–1957
- John M. Murphy (1926–2015) – US House of Representatives 1963–1981; convicted in Abscam bribery case
- William L. Murphy (1944–2010) – district attorney 1983–2003
- Benjamin Nichols (1920–2007) – science educator and Democratic Socialist mayor of Ithaca, NY
- Jerome X. O'Donovan (1944–2014) – NY City Council 1983–2001; great-grandson of Irish activists Jeremiah and Mary Jane O'Donovan Rossa
- James A. O'Leary (1889–1944) – US House of Representatives 1935–1944; great-grandfather of Vito Fossella
- Joseph A. Palma (1889–1969) – borough president 1934–1945
- Harry J. Palmer (1872–1948) – NY State Senate 1929–1934
- John Palmer (1842–1905) – Civil War officer; elected as NY secretary of state
- Ruth Perry (1939–2017) – Liberian senator, head of state 1996–1997
- George M. Pinney Jr. (1856–1921) – Richmond County district attorney; town supervisor of Castleton, Staten Island
- Anning Smith Prall (1870–1937) – US House of Representatives 1923–1934; FCC chair 1935–1937; namesake of Prall Intermediate School (I.S. 27)
- Edmund P. Radigan (1889–1968) – NY State Assembly 1945–1948
- John H. Ray (1886–1975) – US House of Representatives 1953–1962
- William N. Reidy (1912–1952) – NY State Assembly 1949–1952
- Joseph Ridgway (1783–1861) – Ohio House of Representatives 1828–1831; US House of Representatives 1837–1843
- Lucio F. Russo (1912–2004) – NY State Assembly 1953–1974
- Antonio López de Santa Anna (1794–1876) – five-time president of Mexico; retook the Alamo; exiled on Staten Island
- Alfred E. Santangelo (1912–1978) – NY State Senate; US House of Representatives
- Henry J. Seaman (1805–1861) – US House of Representatives 1845–1847
- William Allaire Shortt (1859–1915) – NY State Assembly 1908–1911
- William A. Stevens (1879–1941) – president of New Jersey Senate; New Jersey attorney general
- Vito J. Titone (1929–2005) – associate judge of New York Court of Appeals 1985–1998; father of Matthew
- Daniel D. Tompkins (1774–1825) – NY governor; US vice president; established Tompkinsville, SI Ferry, Richmond Turnpike (Victory Blvd.)
- Hannah Tompkins (1781–1829) – NY First Lady; US Second Lady; wife of Daniel
- Minthorne Tompkins (1807–1881) – NY State Assembly; NY State Senate; son of Daniel and Hannah; co-founder of NY Republican Party, and Stapleton
- Julia Gardiner Tyler (1820–1889) – second wife of US President John Tyler; resided in Staten Island after being widowed during the Civil War
- Jacob Tyson (1773–1848) – town supervisor of Castleton, Staten Island; county judge; US House of Representatives 1823–1825; NY State Senate
- Calvin D. Van Name (1857–1924) – NY State Assembly; borough president 1915–1921
- Thomas J. Walsh (1891/1892–1955) – NY State Senate; district attorney; judge
- Henry Litchfield West (1859–1940) – journalist and member of the board of commissioners for Washington, DC
- Hubbard R. Yetman (1847–1924) – NY State Assembly; town supervisor of Westfield, Staten Island

=== Recent ===
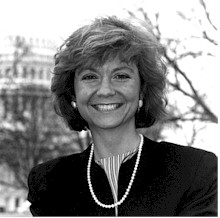
Susan Molinari

- Sal Albanese (born 1949) – NY City Council 1983–1997, representing Brooklyn; four-time mayoral candidate
- Joseph Borelli (born 1982) – NY State Assembly 2013–2015; NY City Council 2015–2025; conservative commentator
- Justin Brannan (born 1978) – NY City Council, representing Brooklyn; former musician; attended College of Staten Island
- David Carr (born 1987) – NY City Council 2021–
- Ronald Castorina – NY State Assembly 2016–2018; judge 2021–
- Alfred C. Cerullo III (born 1961) – NY City Council 1990–1994, commissioner 1994–1999, professional actor in theater and television
- Michael Cusick (born 1969) – NY State Assembly 2003–2023
- Serena DiMaso (born 1963) – New Jersey politician
- Dan Donovan (born 1956) – district attorney 2004–2015; US House of Representatives 2015–2018
- Charles Fall (born 1989) – NY State Assembly 2019–
- Stephen Fiala – NY City Council 1998–2001
- Vito Fossella (born 1965) – Republican member of NY City Council 1994–1997; US House of Representatives 1997–2008; borough president 2022–
- John Fusco (born 1937) – NY City Council 1992–1998; judge 1998–2013
- Sara M. Gonzalez – NY City Council 2002–2013, representing Brooklyn; attended College of Staten Island
- John T. Gregorio (1928−2013) – New Jersey politician
- Michael Grimm (born 1970) – Republican member of US House of Representatives 2011–2014; former FBI agent
- Kamillah Hanks (born 1972) – NY City Council 2022–
- Rick Hillenbrand – member of West Virginia House of Delegates 2022–; born on Staten Island
- Janele Hyer-Spencer (born 1964) – NY State Assembly 2007–2010
- Vincent M. Ignizio (born 1974) – NY State Assembly; NY City Council
- Andrew Lanza (born 1964) – NY City Council; NY State Senate
- John W. Lavelle (1949–2007) – NY State Assembly 2001–2007
- Donna Lupardo (born 1954) – NY State Assembly, representing Binghamton; born and educated on Staten Island
- Nicole Malliotakis (born 1980) – Republican, NY State Assembly 2011–2020; US House of Representatives 2021–
- John J. Marchi (1921–2009) – NY State Senate 1957–2006; led Staten Island's NYC secession movement
- Steven Matteo (born 1977) – NY City Council 2015–2021
- Michael McMahon (born 1957) – NY City Council 2003–2008; US House of Representatives 2009–2010; district attorney 2016–
- Matthew Mirones (born 1956) – NY State Assembly 2002–2006
- Kenneth Mitchell (born 1965) – NY City Council 2009; executive director of Staten Island Zoo 2010–
- Guy Molinari (1928–2018) – NY State Assembly 1975–1980; US House of Representatives 1981–1989; borough president 1990–2001; father of Susan
- Susan Molinari (born 1958) – US House of Representatives 1990–1997; keynote speaker for 1996 Republican National Convention
- James Molinaro (born 1931) – borough president 2002–2013
- Frank Morano (born 1984/1985) – NY City Council 2025– ; talk-radio host
- James Oddo (born 1966) – Republican member of NY City Council 1999–2013; borough president 2014–2021
- Michelle Paige Paterson (born 1961) – NY First Lady, wife of Governor David Paterson
- Sam Pirozzolo – NY State Assembly 2023–
- Michael Reilly (born 1973) – NY State Assembly 2019–
- Leticia Remauro – Republican county chair 1999–2002
- Debi Rose (born 1951) – Democratic member of NY City Council for the North Shore of Staten Island, 2010–2021
- Max Rose (born 1986) – Democratic member of US House of Representatives, 2019–2020
- Diane Savino (born 1963) – NY State Senate 2005–2022
- Jessica Scarcella-Spanton – NY State Senate 2023–
- Philip S. Straniere – Staten Island Civil Court judge 1997–
- Robert Straniere (born 1941) – NY State Assembly 1981–2004; brother of Philip
- Michael Tannousis (born 1983) – NY State Assembly 2021–
- Matthew Titone (born 1961) – NY State Assembly 2007–2018; Richmond County surrogate judge 2019–
- Louis Tobacco (born 1972) – NY State Assembly 2007–2012
- Eric N. Vitaliano (born 1948) – NY State Assembly 1983–2001; judge 2001–

== Religion ==
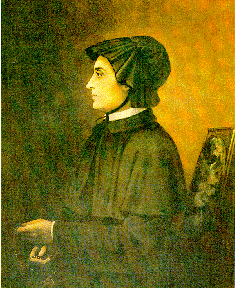
Elizabeth Ann Bayley Seton

- Patrick Ahern (1919–2011) – Catholic priest and bishop
- James Roosevelt Bayley (1814–1877) – nephew of St. Elizabeth Ann Bayley Seton; Catholic pastor of St. Peter's Church; bishop of Newark; archbishop of Baltimore
- William H. Boole (1827–1896) – Methodist pastor and prominent Prohibitionist
- Robert Anthony Brucato (1931–2018) – Catholic priest and bishop
- Peter John Byrne (born 1951) – Catholic priest and bishop
- Romi Cohn (1929–2020) – Orthodox Jewish rabbi, mohel, Holocaust survivor, and real-estate developer
- Dorothy Day (1897–1980) – social activist and radical; co-founder of Catholic Worker movement and newspaper; candidate for sainthood
- Edward Doane (1820–1890) – Congregationalist missionary to Pacific islands
- Edmund J. Dobbin (1935–2015) – Augustinian Catholic priest and longest-serving president of Villanova University
- John Christopher Drumgoole (1816–1888) – Catholic priest and founder of Mount Loretto Children's Home
- John Murphy Farley (1842–1918) – cardinal; Catholic archbishop of New York; priest at St. Peter's Church 1870–1872
- Joseph A. Farrell (1873–1960) – Catholic priest, teacher, namesake of Monsignor Farrell High School
- Reuven Feinstein (born 1937) – Orthodox Jewish rabbi; head of the Yeshiva of Staten Island
- George Henry Guilfoyle (1913–1991) – Catholic priest and bishop
- Edward D. Head (1919–2005) – Catholic priest and bishop
- Eliza Healy (1846–1919, known as Sister Saint Mary Magdalen) – one of the first African-American Catholic mother superiors, including of Notre Dame Academy, Staten Island
- Metropolitan Ireney (born Ivan Dmitriyevich Bekish, 1892–1981) – primate of the Orthodox Church in America
- Walter P. Kellenberg (1901–1986) – Catholic priest and bishop
- Thomas John McDonnell (1894–1961) – Catholic priest and bishop
- Richard Channing Moore (1762–1841) – Episcopal rector of St. Andrew's Church; bishop of Virginia
- William Muhm (born 1957) – Catholic priest, chaplain, bishop
- Miguel Pedro Mundo (1937–1999) – Catholic priest and bishop
- Patrick O'Boyle (1896–1987) – cardinal; Catholic archbishop of Washington; director of Mount Loretto 1936–1943
- John Joseph O'Hara (born 1946) – Catholic priest and bishop
- Frank Pavone (born 1959) – Catholic ex-priest and anti-abortion activist
- Satsvarupa das Goswami (born Stephen Guarino, 1939) – writer, poet, artist, and guru for the International Society for Krishna Consciousness
- Elizabeth Ann Bayley Seton (1774–1821) – first American-born Roman Catholic saint; founder of American branch of Sisters of Charity; Staten Island resident in 1790s
- Anson Phelps Stokes II (1874–1958) – Episcopal priest; secretary of Yale University; civil rights activist; son of namesake mining executive; father of namesake bishop
- William Greenough Thayer (1863–1934) – Episcopal minister and educator, born in New Brighton, Staten Island
- Terry Troia (born 1958) – Reformed minister; longtime leader of Staten Island's interfaith nonprofit Project Hospitality
- Edmund James Whalen (born 1958) – Catholic priest and bishop; graduate and former principal of Msgr. Farrell H.S.

== Science, mathematics, medicine ==
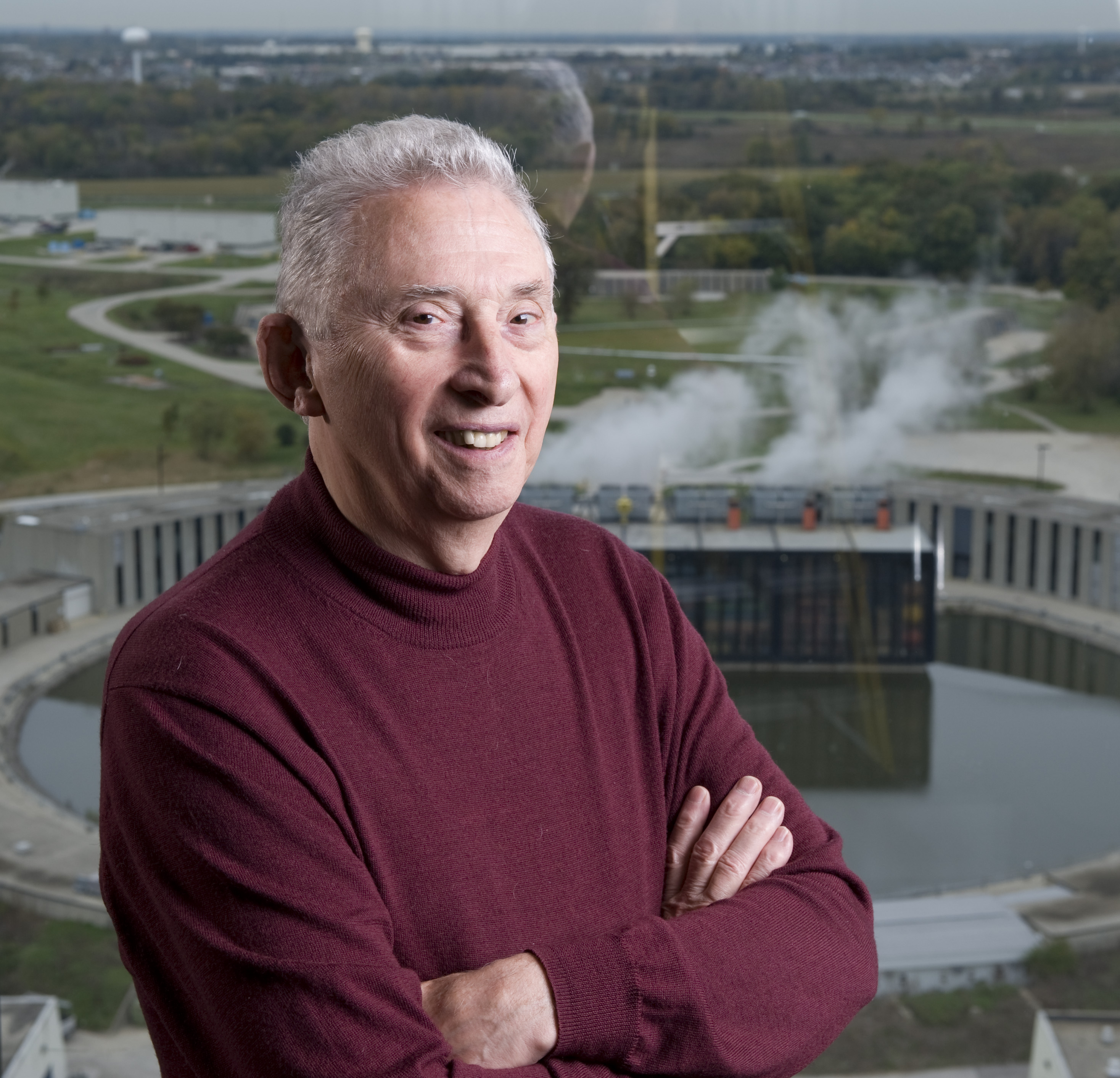
John Peoples Jr.

- Oscar Auerbach (1905–1997) – pathologist who helped prove that smoking causes lung cancer
- Nathaniel Lord Britton (1859–1934) – co-founder of New York Botanical Garden; donor of The Britton Cottage, now in Richmondtown
- James Chapin (1889–1964) – ornithologist for American Museum of Natural History; author of the landmark Birds of the Belgian Congo
- Helen Clevenger (1917–1936) – NYU chemistry student who was murdered in North Carolina
- William T. Davis (1862–1945) – naturalist, entomologist, historian; co-founder of Staten Island Institute of Arts & Sciences
- Samuel Mackenzie Elliott (1811–1875) – pioneer of American ophthalmology; abolitionist leader; lieutenant colonel
- Allan L. Goldstein (born 1937) – biochemist, specializing in the thymus gland and the immune system
- Augustus Radcliffe Grote (1841–1903) – entomologist, expert on butterflies and moths
- Clifford Hagen (born 1966) – naturalist and environmental activist
- Gary Hartstein (born 1955) – anaesthesiologist, emergency physician for Formula One racing events
- Arthur Hollick (1857–1933) – paleobotanist, expert on fossil plants
- Bruce Kershner (1950–2007) – forest ecologist, environmentalist, biology teacher
- Rebecca Lancefield (1895–1981) – microbiologist at Rockefeller University and Columbia University; expert on streptococcal bacteria
- Charles W. Leng (1859–1941) – naturalist, entomologist, historian; co-founder of Staten Island Institute of Arts & Sciences
- Lily McNair – psychologist; past provost of Wagner College; president of Tuskegee University
- John Coleman Moore (1923–2016) – mathematician and professor, specializing in algebraic topology
- Peter Panzica (born 1965) – director of anesthesiology; Harvard Medical School faculty
- John Peoples Jr. (1933–2025) – physicist; director of Fermilab and Sloan Digital Sky Survey
- George H. Pepper (1873–1924) – archaeologist, specializing in Native American burial grounds
- Leonard Radinsky (1937–1985) – paleontologist and professor, specializing in fossil mammals
- Edward H. Robitzek (1912–1984) – tuberculosis expert and chief physician at Sea View Hospital; helped develop isoniazid antibiotic treatment
- Doris Schattschneider (born 1939) – geometer and professor; first female editor of Mathematics Magazine
- Leroy Louis Schwartz (1932/1933–1997) – pediatrician; health policy researcher
- Lynn Steen (1941–2015) – mathematician and professor, president of Mathematical Association of America
- Henry Taber (1860–1936) – mathematician and professor, specializing in linear algebra; brother of Shakespearean actor Robert Taber
- Kaya Thomas – app developer; mentor with Black Girls Code
- Thomas Gordon Thompson (1888–1961) – oceanographer and professor, specializing in the chemistry of the sea
- Paul Torgersen (1931–2015) – engineering professor and president of Virginia Tech
- Mikhail Varshavski (born 1989) – "Doctor Mike", celebrity physician
- Richard Veit (born 1957) – ornithologist specializing in seabirds; professor at College of Staten Island
- J. Lamar Worzel (1919–2008) – geophysical oceanographer, specializing in deep-sea acoustics and gravity measurements

== Sports ==
=== Baseball ===
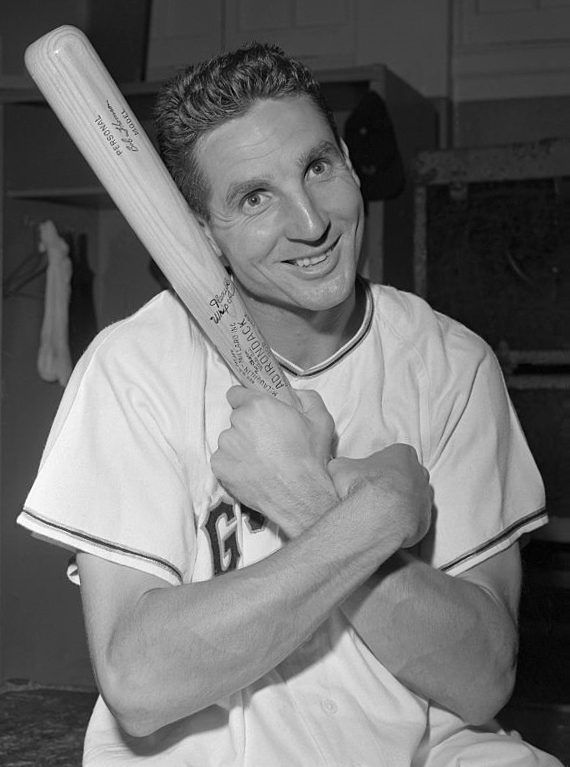
Bobby Thomson

- Tim Adleman (b. 1987) – Major League Baseball (MLB) and KBO League (KBO) pitcher; attended Georgetown University
- Rich Aurilia (b. 1971) – MLB All-Star shortstop; attended St. John's University
- George Bamberger (1923–2004) – MLB pitcher, pitching coach, and manager
- Larry Bearnarth (1941–1999) – MLB pitcher and pitching coach, attended St. John's University
- Cliff Brantley (b. 1968) – MLB pitcher; attended Port Richmond High School
- Julie Bowers (1926–1977) – Negro League catcher, played for New York Black Yankees
- Jerry Casale (1933–2019) – MLB pitcher; Staten Island resident
- Gloria Cordes (Elliott) (1931–2018) – All-American Girls Professional Baseball League (AAGPBL) pitcher
- Tom Cosgrove (b. 1996) – MLB pitcher; attended Monsignor Farrell High School
- Jack Cronin (1874–1929) – MLB pitcher from 1895 to 1904
- Terry Crowley (b. 1947) – MLB outfielder and hitting coach, won World Series ring; attended Curtis High School
- Nick Dini (b. 1993) – MLB catcher
- Karl Drews (1920–1963) – MLB pitcher; attended Ralph R. McKee CTE High School
- Jack Egbert (b. 1983) – MLB pitcher
- Brian Esposito (b. 1979) – MLB catcher; attended Staten Island Technical High School
- Dude Esterbrook (1857–1901) – MLB third baseman and manager
- Bobby Evans – MLB executive, including general manager of the San Francisco Giants
- Frank Fernández (b. 1943) – MLB catcher and outfielder, the "Staten Island Strongboy"; attended Curtis High School
- Matt Festa (b. 1993) – MLB pitcher
- John Franco (b. 1960) – MLB pitcher; Staten Island resident
- Grover Froese (1916–1982) – MLB umpire and scout
- Matt Galante (b. 1944) – MLB bench coach; Staten Island resident
- Frank Genovese (1914–1981) – MLB outfielder and scout, minor league manager; older brother of George
- George Genovese (1922–2015) – MLB pinch hitter specialist, minor league manager; attended Port Richmond High School
- Zack Granite (b. 1992) – MLB outfielder; attended Tottenville High School
- Lee Howard (1923–2018) – MLB pitcher in 1946 and 1947
- John H. Johnson (1921–1988) – executive, president of National Association of Professional Baseball Leagues
- Bill Lindsey (b. 1960) – MLB catcher
- Hank Majeski (1916–1991) – MLB third baseman and batting coach; minor league manager and Wagner College coach
- Jason Marquis (b. 1978) – MLB All-Star pitcher; attended Tottenville High School
- Joe McDonald (b. 1929) – MLB executive, including general manager of three teams; won six World Series rings
- Matty McIntyre (1880–1920) – MLB outfielder; helped lead the Detroit Tigers to the World Series in 1908 and 1909
- Frank Menechino (b. 1971) – MLB infielder and designated hitter; attended Susan E. Wagner High School and University of Alabama
- Pete Mikkelsen (1939–2006) – MLB relief pitcher
- Rose Montalbano – AAGPBL infielder, 1951–1953
- Al Naples (1926–2021) – MLB shortstop in 1949
- Larry Napp (born Larry Albert Napodano, 1916–1993) – MLB umpire
- Craig Noto – head baseball coach for Wagner College; former player and coach for St. Peter's Boys High School
- Joe Pignatano (1929–2022) – MLB catcher and bullpen coach; won World Series ring
- Glen Richardson (1927–2017) – second baseman for the New York Black Yankees; attended Tottenville High School
- Sonny Ruberto (1946–2014) – MLB catcher; attended Curtis High School
- Rich Scheid (b. 1965) – MLB pitcher
- George Sharrott (1869–1932) – MLB pitcher from 1893 to 1894
- Jack Sharrott (1869–1927) – MLB pitcher and outfielder from 1890 to 1893; cousin of George
- Duane Singleton (b. 1972) – MLB center fielder
- Shea Spitzbarth (b. 1994) – MLB pitcher
- Jack Taylor (1873–1900) – MLB pitcher in the National League from 1891 to 1899
- Bobby Thomson (1923–2010) – MLB All-Star third baseman and outfielder, hit "Shot Heard 'Round the World"; attended Curtis High School
- Bill Traffley (1859–1908) – MLB catcher for the Chicago White Stockings
- Tuck Turner (1867–1945) – MLB outfielder from 1893 to 1898
- Billy Urbanski (1903–1973) – MLB infielder for the Boston Braves
- Frank Umont (1917–1991) – MLB umpire, after several years playing football for the New York Giants
- Anthony Varvaro (1984–2022) – MLB pitcher and Port Authority police officer; graduated from Curtis High School and St. John's University
- Mookie Wilson (b. 1956) – MLB center fielder; Staten Island resident

=== Basketball ===
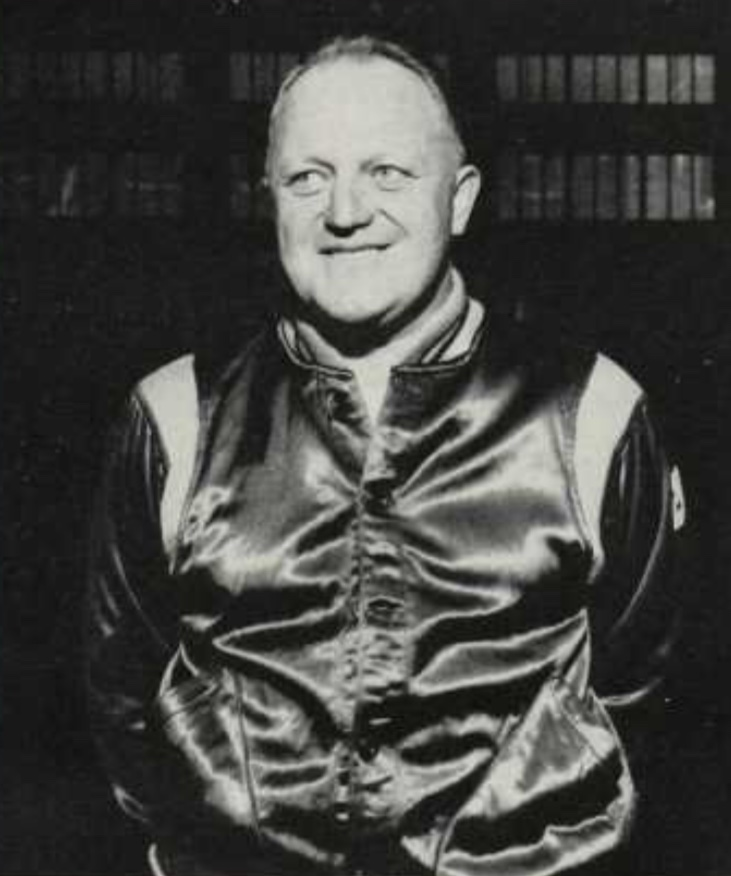
Elmer Ripley

- Nicky Anosike (b. 1986) – Women's National Basketball Association (WNBA) forward/center; attended St. Peter's Girls High School
- O. D. Anosike (b. 1991) – European professional forward/center; two-time Rebounding leader in NCAA Division I; attended Siena College; younger brother of Nicky
- Renaldo Balkman (b. 1984) – National Basketball Association (NBA) forward; No. 1 draft choice of the New York Knicks; plays internationally
- Julian Champagnie (b. 2001) – NBA guard/forward; twin brother of Justin
- Justin Champagnie (b. 2001) – NBA forward/guard; twin brother of Julian
- Ray Corley (1928–2007) – NBA guard, attended St. Peter's Boys High School
- Mike Deane (b. 1951) – head coach of college basketball teams, including Wagner College
- Jennifer Derevjanik (b. 1982) – WNBA guard; attended George Mason University and St. Peter's Girls High School
- Billy Donovan (b. 1965) – NBA guard and head coach; played for Staten Island Stallions of the United States Basketball League (USBL)
- Jim Engles (b. 1968) – head coach at Columbia University
- Warren Fenley (1922–2009) – Basketball Association of America (BAA) forward (pre-NBA); coached Monsignor Farrell High School and Moore Catholic High School
- Mouhamadou Gueye (b. 1998) – NBA power forward
- Halil Kanacevic (b. 1991) – European professional forward/center; attended Curtis High School
- Victoria Macaulay (b. 1990) – center in WNBA and other professional leagues worldwide; attended Curtis High School
- Hassan Martin (b. 1995) – professional forward in Japan and Germany
- Kyle McAlarney (b. 1987) – professional guard in France, then head coach for his alma mater, Moore Catholic High School
- Kevin O'Connor – NBA general manager and executive; attended Monsignor Farrell High School
- Buddy O'Grady (1920–1992) – BAA guard (pre-NBA); head coach at Georgetown University
- Jordan Parks (b. 1994) – Basketball Bundesliga (BBL) forward
- Elmer Ripley (1891–1982) – Naismith Memorial Basketball Hall of Fame member; coached college teams, Olympic teams, and the Harlem Globetrotters
- Ryan Rossiter (b. 1989) – Japan Basketball League (JBL) forward, attended Siena College and Monsignor Farrell High School
- Nakye Sanders (b. 1998) – Liga Portuguesa de Basquetebol forward
- Abdul Shamsid-Deen (b. 1968) – international professional center; 2nd Round draft choice of the Seattle SuperSonics; attended Tottenville High School
- Isaiah Wilkerson (b. 1990) – Liga Nacional de Baloncesto Profesional (LNBP) guard, attended NJIT and Curtis High School
- Andrew Wisniewski (b. 1981) – European professional guard, attended St. Peter's Boys High School

=== Bowling ===
- Joe Berardi (b. 1954) – Professional Bowlers Association (PBA) Hall of Fame member
- Johnny Petraglia (b. 1947) – PBA Hall of Fame member
- Mark Roth (1951–2021) – PBA Hall of Fame member

=== Boxing ===
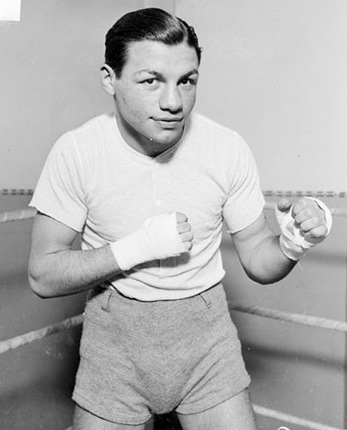
Tony Canzoneri

- Teddy Atlas (b. 1956) – boxing trainer and commentator; trained Michael Moorer and Mike Tyson; winner of the Sam Taub Award
- Marcus Browne (b. 1990) – three-time Golden Gloves Champion; National PAL Champion; 2012 US Olympian
- Tony Canzoneri (1908–1959) – three-time World Champion boxer
- Frankie Genaro (born Frank DiGennaro, 1901–1966) – flyweight gold medalist at the 1920 Olympics
- Oleg Maskaev (b. 1969) – heavyweight boxing champion
- Bill Richmond (1763–1829) – British pugilist; born a slave in colonial Staten Island
- Kevin Rooney (b. 1956) – former boxer and current trainer
- Elijah Tillery (b. 1957) – cruiserweight and heavyweight professional boxer

=== Football ===
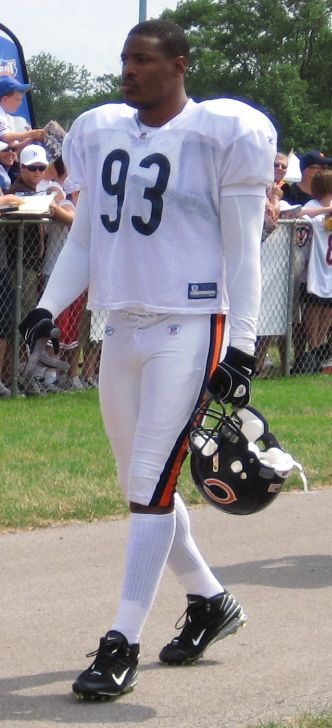
Adewale Ogunleye

- Emmanuel Akah (b. 1979) – National Football League (NFL) and NFL Europa offensive lineman
- Lou Anarumo (b. 1966) – coaching staff member of college and NFL teams
- Joe Andruzzi (b. 1975) – NFL offensive lineman, won three Super Bowl rings
- Dawn Aponte – NFL executive
- Teddy Atlas III – professional football scout; son of boxing trainer Teddy Atlas
- Dan Blaine (1891–1958) – halfback, owner of the Staten Island Stapletons; brought team into NFL
- Micah Brown (b. 1986) – Canadian Football League (CFL) and Arena Football quarterback
- Irv Constantine (1907–1966) – NFL back, for one game with the Staten Island Stapletons; attended Curtis High School
- Anthony Coyle (b. 1996) – NFL offensive tackle for the Pittsburgh Steelers; attended Tottenville High School
- Kevin Coyle (b. 1956) – coaching staff member of college and NFL teams; Alliance of American Football (AAF) head coach
- Dominique Easley (b. 1992) – NFL linebacker, won a Super Bowl ring; attended Curtis High School
- Gus Edwards (b. 1995) – NFL running back for the Baltimore Ravens
- Frank Ferrara (b. 1975) – NFL defensive end; attended New Dorp High School
- Steve Gregory (b. 1983) – NFL safety and coach; Detroit Lions defensive assistant
- Percy Haughton (1876–1924) – college head coach, won three NCAA championships, College Football Hall of Fame member; baseball coach and investor
- Vidal Hazelton (b. 1988) – NFL and CFL wide receiver, attended Moore Catholic High School
- Jim Lee Howell (1914–1995) – NFL receiver and defensive back; head coach for the New York Giants and Wagner College
- James Jenkins (b. 1967) – NFL tight end, won a Super Bowl ring
- Rich Kotite (b. 1942) – NFL tight end, head coach of the Philadelphia Eagles and New York Jets; attended Wagner College
- Shemiah LeGrande (b. 1986) – NFL and Indoor American football defensive tackle
- Pete Lembo (b. 1970) – coaching staff member of college teams
- Dino Mangiero (b. 1958) – NFL defensive lineman, attended Curtis High School
- Tom Masella (b. 1959) – head coach of several college football teams, including Wagner College
- Hurvin McCormack (b. 1972) – NFL defensive tackle, attended New Dorp High School
- Dennis McKnight (b. 1959) – NFL guard, coaching staff member of college and CFL teams; Hamilton Tiger-Cats offensive line coach
- Dan Mullen (b. 1972) – college football coach; graduate of Wagner College
- Ollie Ogbu (b. 1987) – NFL, CFL, and Arena football defensive tackle, attended St. Joseph by the Sea High School
- Adewale Ogunleye (b. 1977) – NFL defensive end; attended Indiana University and Tottenville High School
- Eric Olsen (b. 1988) – NFL center, attended Notre Dame
- David Richards (b. 1966) – NFL guard; 1983 USA Today High School All-American
- Peter Rossomando (b. 1972) – college head coach at Central Connecticut
- Lewis Sanders (b. 1978) – NFL cornerback, attended University of Maryland and St. Peter's Boys High School
- William Shakespeare (1912–1974) – college halfback at Notre Dame, College Football Hall of Fame member, "The Bard of Staten Island"
- Mike Siani (b. 1950) – NFL wide receiver, No. 1 draft choice of the Oakland Raiders; attended Villanova University
- Jeff Stoutland (b. 1962) – NFL coach, graduate of Port Richmond High School
- Mickey Sullivan (1916–2000) – head football coach at Wagner College from 1957 to 1961
- Vernon Turner (b. 1967) – NFL and NFL Europa running back, wide receiver, and return specialist; attended Curtis High School

=== Golf ===
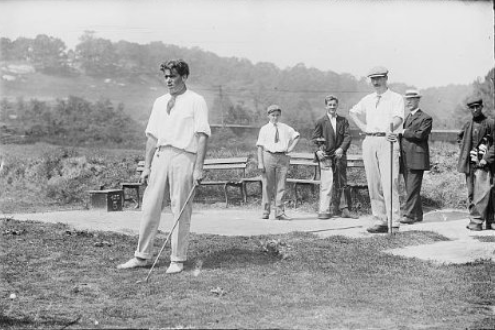
Isaac Mackie
- Jim Albus (b. 1940) – winner of multiple tournaments on the PGA Tour Champions
- Bill Britton (b. 1955) – tournament winner on the PGA Tour; won 1975 National Junior College Athletic Association Championship
- Carolyn Cudone (1918–2009) – won a United States Golf Association (USGA) record five-straight U.S. Senior Women's Amateur Championships
- Frank Esposito (b. 1963) – golfer on the PGA Tour Champions
- Frank Hannigan (1931–2014) – USGA executive director, TV golf analyst, Staten Island Advance golf columnist
- Sean Kelly (b. 1993) – golfer on the Korn Ferry Tour
- Isaac Mackie (1880–1963) – head professional at Fox Hills Golf Course in Clifton, where he won the Eastern PGA Championship in 1908
- Joe Moresco (1931–2017) – Hall of Fame member of the Metropolitan section of the Professional Golfers' Association of America (PGA)

=== Gymnastics ===
- Olivia Greaves (b. 2004) – competitive gymnast, member of Junior National Team
- Dominick Minicucci (b. 1969) – 1988 and 1992 Olympic gymnast

=== Hockey ===
- Zach Aston-Reese (b. 1994) – National Hockey League (NHL) forward for the Toronto Maple Leafs
- Henry Clifford (1928–2021) – field hockey player in the 1956 Summer Olympics
- Nick Fotiu (b. 1952) – NHL and World Hockey Association (WHA) forward; first player from New York City to play for the New York Rangers
- Joe Gambardella (b. 1993) – NHL center for the Edmonton Oilers
- Jack Krumpe (1936–2020) – multi-sport executive, including president of the New York Rangers, Islanders, Knicks, and Madison Square Garden
- Kevin Labanc (b. 1995) – NHL right wing for the San Jose Sharks
- Kurt Orban (1916–2006) – field hockey player in the 1948 and 1956 Summer Olympics

=== Ice skating ===
- Silvia Fontana (b. 1976) – Italian figure skater in the 2002 and 2006 Winter Olympics; born in Staten Island
- Lynn Kriengkrairut (b. 1988) – ice dancer

=== Martial arts ===
- Nick Pace (b. 1987) – Ultimate Fighting Championship (UFC) bantamweight fighter
- Ricco Rodriguez (b. 1977) – Winner of UFC Heavyweight Championship, World Jiu-Jitsu Championship, and ADCC Submission Wrestling World Championship

=== Racket sports ===
- Shawn Jackson (b. 2000) – professional tennis player, including the 2020 New York Open
- Sudsy Monchik (b. 1974) – five-time Pro World Champion racquetball player; attended Tottenville High School
- Mary Ewing Outerbridge (1852–1886) – "mother of American tennis"; set up one of the first courts in the US; buried in Silver Mount Cemetery in Silver Lake; sister of industrialist Eugenius Harvey Outerbridge
- Bob Wrenn (1873–1925) – four-time U.S. singles championship winner was tennis member of Richmond County Country Club

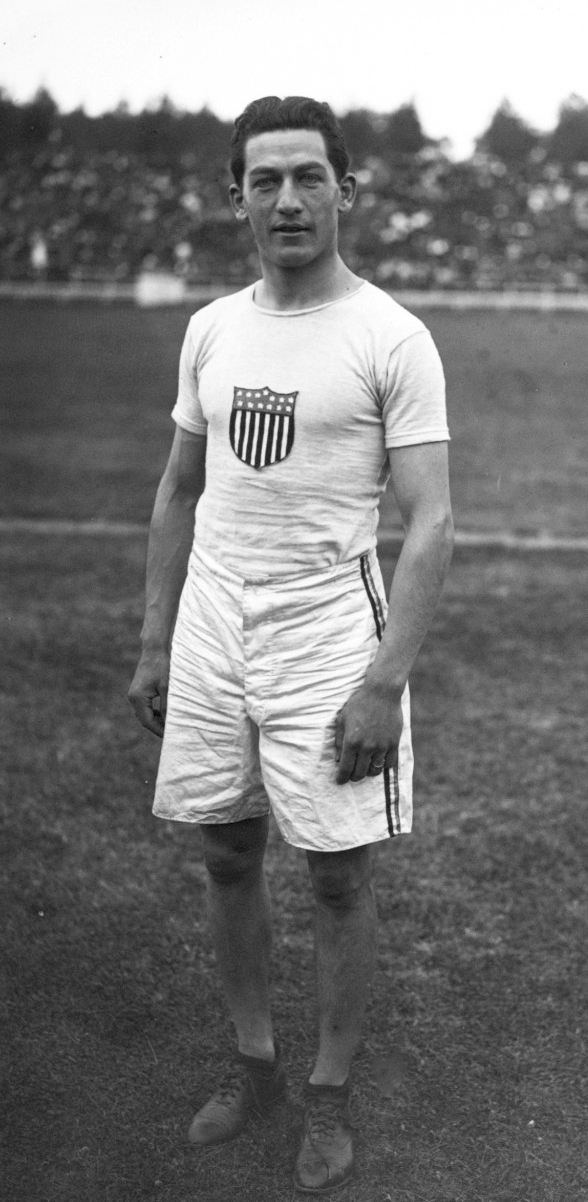
Abel Kiviat

=== Soccer ===
- Chris Agoliati (b. 1951) – American Soccer League and North American Soccer League forward and midfielder
- Jack Hynes (1920–2013) – American Soccer League, outside right; National Soccer Hall of Fame member
- George Weah (b. 1966) – FIFA World Player of the Year for 1995; president of Liberia 2018–2024
- John Wolyniec (b. 1977) – Major League Soccer (MLS) forward for Red Bull New York

=== Track and field ===
- Robby Andrews (b. 1991) – 2016 Olympic team and 2017 national champion in the 1500m run; Staten Island native
- Ashley Higginson (b. 1989) – middle-distance runner; set 3000m steeplechase record in 2015 Pan Am Games
- Bill Jankunis (b. 1955) – 1976 Olympic high jump competitor
- Marilyn King (b. 1949) – pentathlete for Tottenville High School, AAU, Pan American Games, and 1972–1980 Olympic teams
- Abel Kiviat (1892–1991) – 1912 Summer Olympics silver medalist in the 1500m run; world record holder; Gold Medal team in the 3000m relay

=== Wrestling ===
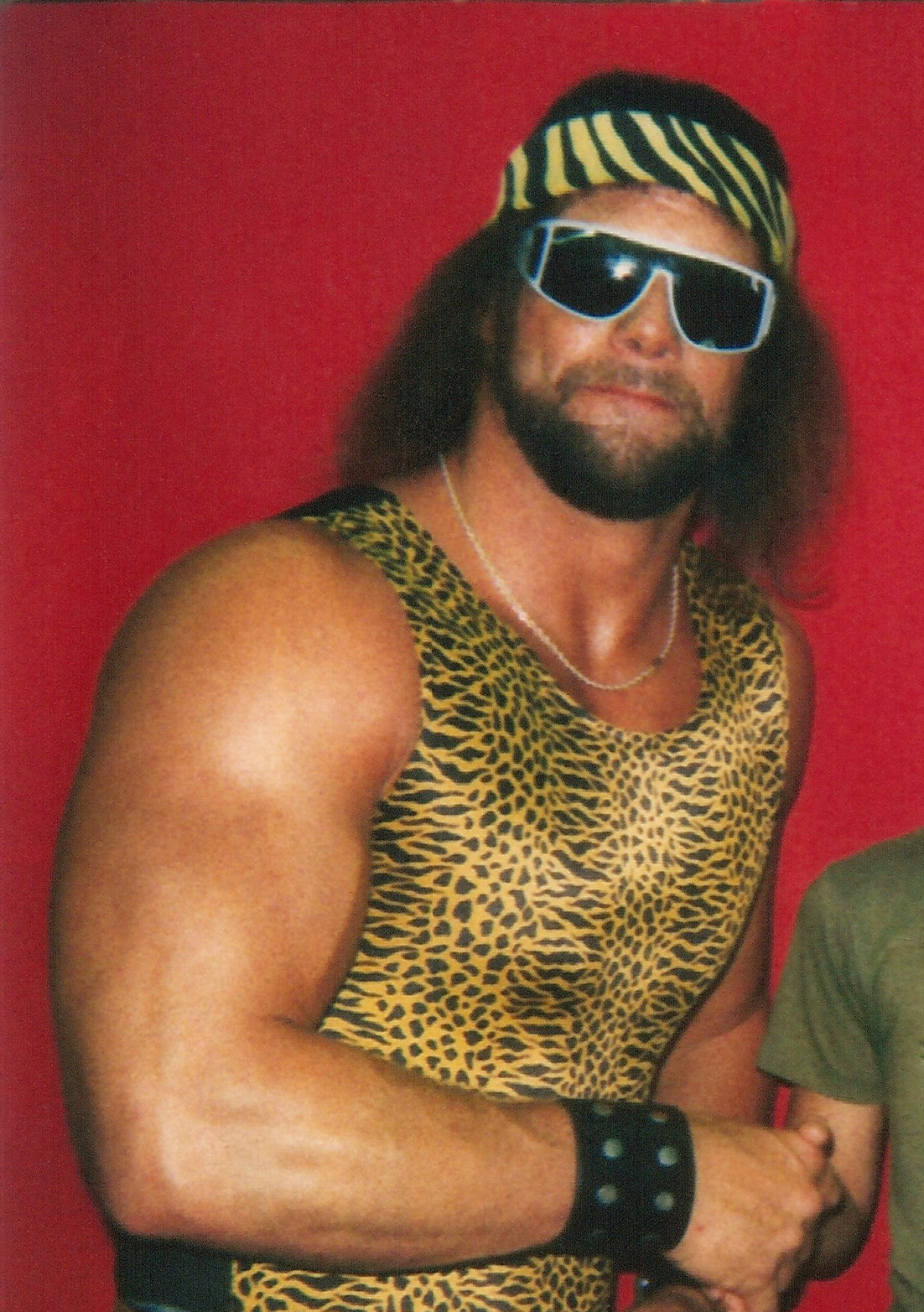
Randy Savage

- Tim Arson (born Timothy R. Calkins Jr., 1976–2015) – World Wrestling Council (WWC) wrestler
- Chris Dickinson (born Christopher Torre, 1987) – professional wrestler with six tag-team championships
- Tony Garea (born Anthony Gareljich, 1946) – World Wrestling Entertainment (WWE) wrestler
- Vito LoGrasso (b. 1964) – WWE wrestler
- Sean Maluta (b. 1988) – WWE wrestler known as "The Samoan Dragon"
- Sabu (born Terry Brunk) – Extreme Championship Wrestling (ECW) champion
- Randy Savage (born Randall Mario Poffo, 1952–2011) – World Championship Wrestling (WCW) and WWE wrestler known as "Macho Man"

=== Other ===
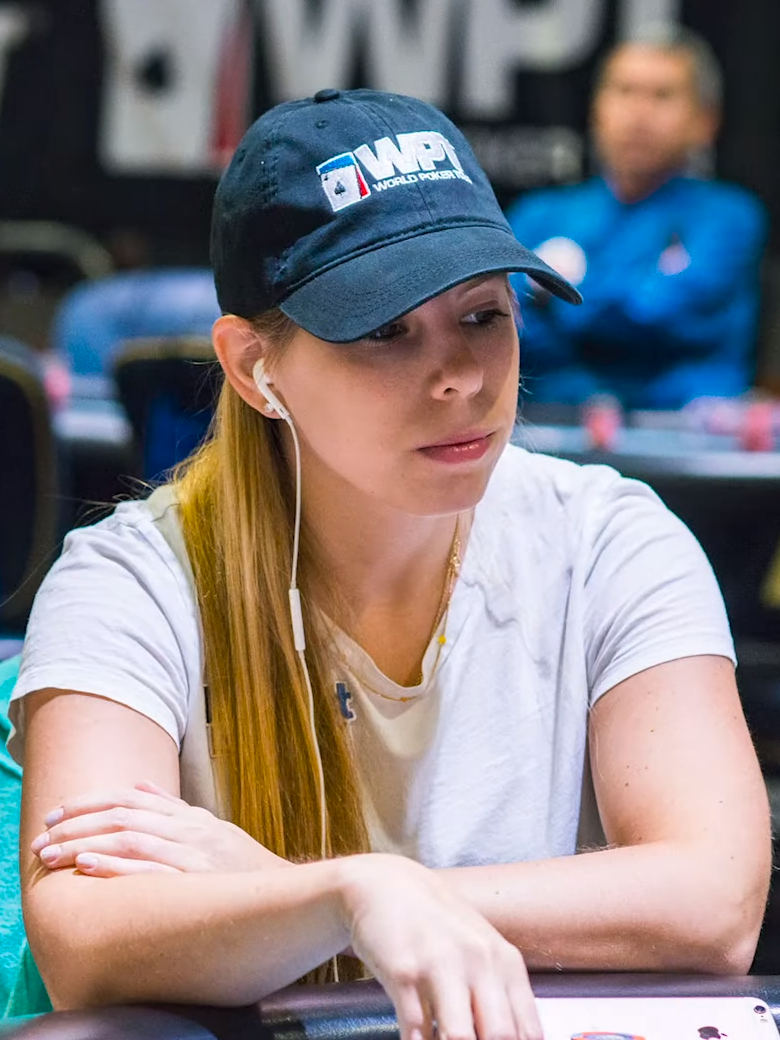
Loni Harwood

- Carl Borack (b. 1947) – fencer; participated in the 1972 Summer Olympic Games
- Rick Decker (1903–1966) – race-car driver, including the Indianapolis 500
- Gary di Silvestri (b. 1967) – cross-country skier, 2014 Winter Olympics
- William Butler Duncan II (1862–1933) – leader in New York Yacht Club's long defense of the America's Cup; adoptive son of banker W. Butler Duncan I
- Loni Harwood (b. 1989) – winner of two World Series of Poker bracelets
- Daniella Karagach (b. 1992) – international dance competitor
- John Henry Lake (1877–?) – bronze medalist in cycling at the 1900 Summer Olympics
- Krystal Lara (b. 1998) – Dominican-American swimmer; 2020 Summer Olympics; bronze and silver medalist in 2018 Central American and Caribbean Games
- Robert Pipkins (b. 1973) – 1992 and 1994 Olympic luge
- Ray Rudolph – 1980 Olympic handball team
- George Van Cleaf (1879–1905) – gold medalist in water polo at the 1904 Summer Olympics; he and a teammate died from typhoid fever soon after

== Writers ==
=== Past ===
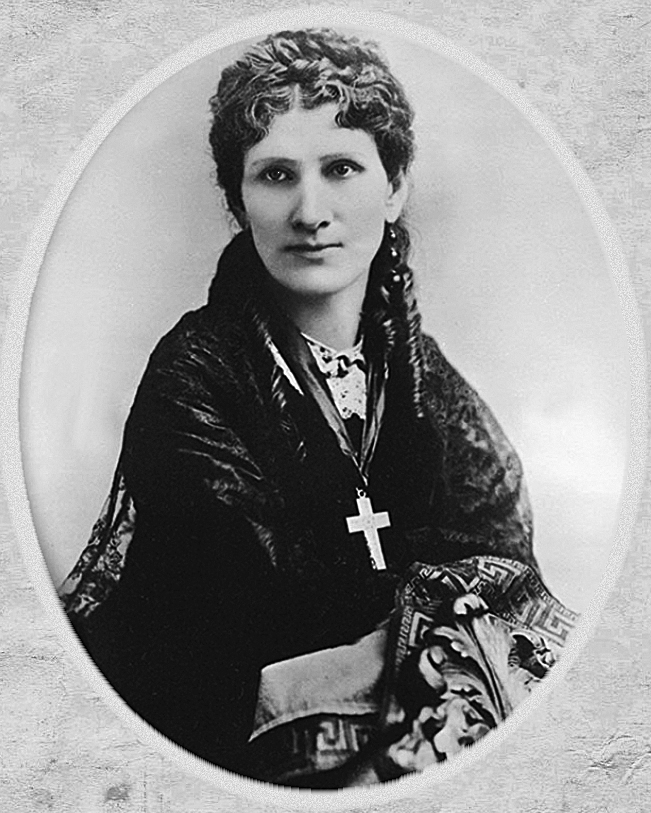
Anna Leonowens

- Charles Brandt (1942–2024), writer
- Henry H. Carter (1905–2001) – linguist, professor, specialist in Spanish and Portuguese translation
- William Rossa Cole (1919–2000) – author, poet, anthologist, editor; grandson of Irish activists Jeremiah and Mary Jane O'Donovan Rossa
- James Gould Cozzens (1903–1978) – short story writer and Pulitzer Prize-winning novelist
- George William Curtis (1824–1892) – author, orator, reformer; namesake of Curtis High School
- Donald Davidson (1917–2003) – influential philosopher and professor
- William Main Doerflinger (1910–2000) – author and editor, including a major collection of folksongs (sea shanties)
- John Drebinger (1891–1979) – sports editor for The Richmond County Advance, longtime baseball reporter for The New York Times, winner of 1973 Spink Award
- Isaac K. Funk (1839–1912) – Lutheran minister; co-founder of Funk & Wagnalls Company, publisher of dictionaries and encyclopedias
- Sydney Howard Gay (1814–1888) – journalist and abolitionist, active in the Underground Railroad
- Emily Genauer (1911–2002) – Pulitzer-winning art critic
- Langston Hughes (1902–1967) – poet; lived and worked for a season on a Staten Island farm growing vegetables
- William James (1842–1910) – philosopher, and his younger brother, novelist Henry James (1843–1916), spent a few summers on Staten Island
- Florence Morse Kingsley (1859–1937) – author of popular and religious fiction
- Audre Lorde (1934–1992) – American writer, professor, philosopher, intersectional feminist, poet and civil rights activist; lived on Staten Island
- Anna Leonowens (1831–1915) – travel writer and educator, governess for King of Siam; memoir evolved into The King and I
- Richard Adams Locke (1800–1871) – editor of The New York Sun; presumed author of the "Great Moon Hoax"; lived on Staten Island
- Laurence Manning (1899–1972) – science fiction author
- Edwin Markham (1852–1940) – poet, school administrator, namesake of Markham Intermediate School (I.S. 51)
- John William Martin (1864/1865–1956) – socialist academic, lecturer, writer; hosted many celebrity authors
- Andy Milligan (1929–1991) – playwright and film director; resided in Staten Island
- Kafū Nagai (born Nagai Sōkichi, 1879–1959) – Japanese author; wrote about his brief residence in American Stories
- Frederick Nebel (1903–1967) – novelist and short story writer known for his hardboiled detective fiction
- Francis Parkman (1823–1893) – historian of the American frontier
- Emily Post (c.1872–1960) – columnist and author, best known for Etiquette in Society, in Business, in Politics, and at Home
- Edwin Arlington Robinson (1869–1935) – three-time winner of Pulitzer Prize for Poetry, best known for the narrative poem "Richard Cory"
- Armand Schwerner (1927–1999) – poet, best known for Tablets; professor at Staten Island Community College and College of Staten Island
- Alan Seeger (1888–1916) – poet and World War I hero (I Have a Rendezvous with Death); brother of Charles Seeger; uncle of Pete Seeger
- Theodore Sturgeon (1918–1985) – science fiction author; born on Staten Island
- Henry David Thoreau (1817–1862) – essayist, philosopher, naturalist; spent his longest time away from Concord, Massachusetts on Staten Island in the 1840s
- Amy Vanderbilt (1908–1974) – author of the best-selling Complete Book of Etiquette; distant cousin of Cornelius Vanderbilt
- Phyllis A. Whitney (1903–2008) – prolific mystery writer; Staten Island resident during 1950s–1960s
- William Winter (1836–1917) – poet, critic, biographer, theater historian
- Paul Zindel (1936–2003) – novelist and Pulitzer-winning playwright, whose stories usually took place on Staten Island

=== Recent ===
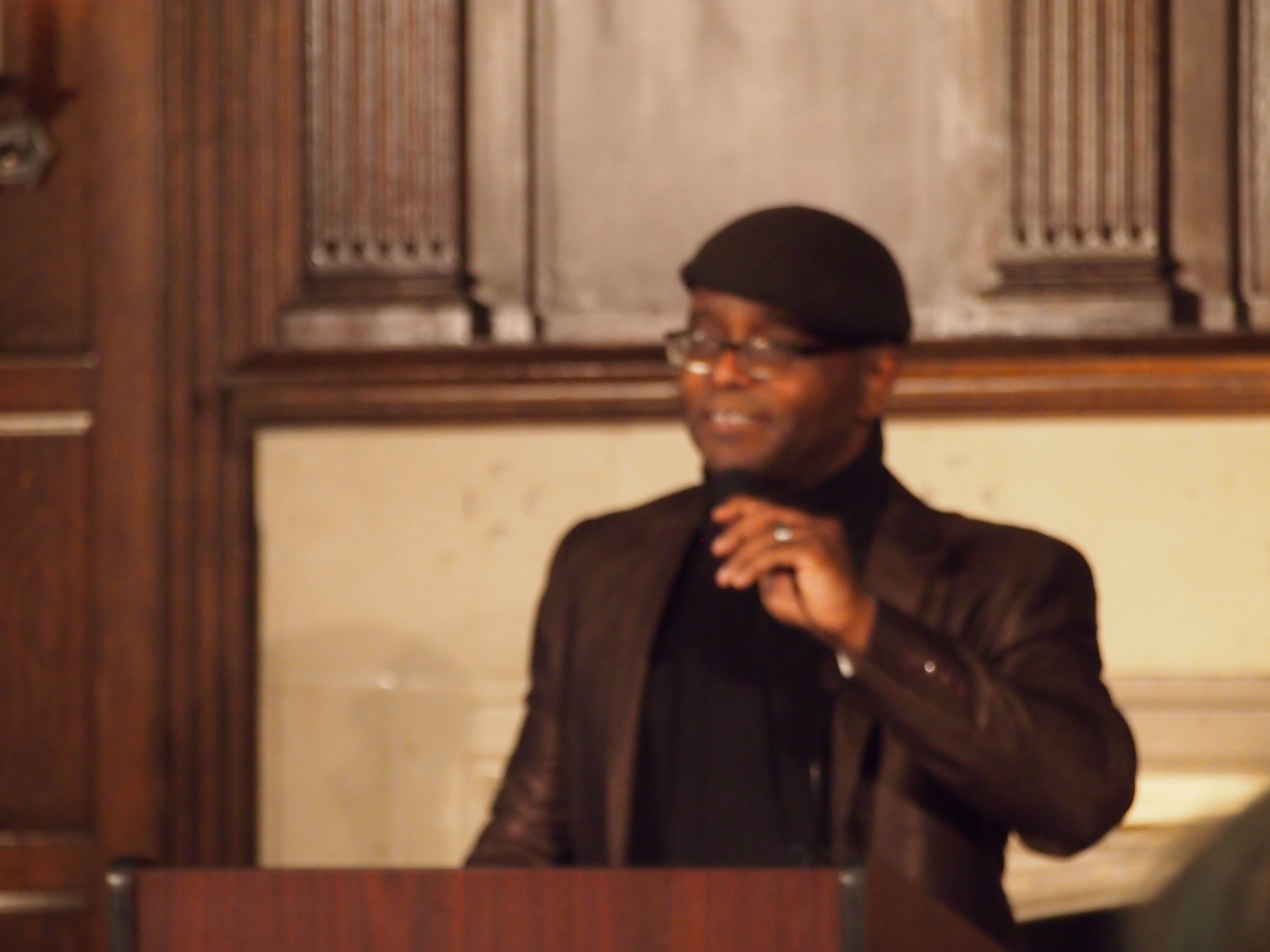
Tyehimba Jess
- Ayad Akhtar (b. 1970) – playwright, novelist, screenwriter; won Pulitzer Prize for Disgraced
- Melissa Anelli (b. 1979) – webmistress of The Leaky Cauldron; author of Harry, A History
- Tracy Brown (b. 1974) – Essence best-selling author; born and raised in Mariners Harbor
- Cheryl Burke (1972–2011) – poet, posthumous winner of Lambda Literary Award for Bisexual Literature
- Gwen Carr – activist, public speaker, author, after her son Eric Garner was killed by police
- Christopher Celenza – historian of the Italian Renaissance; dean of Georgetown University College of Arts and Sciences
- Vito Delsante – comic book writer, including several issues of Scooby-Doo
- Shawnae Dixon (b. 1976) – chef, cookbook author
- C. P. Dunphey (b. 1992) – author of science fiction and horror stories
- Alex Gino (b. 1977) – winner of Stonewall Book Award and Lambda Literary Award for LGBT Children's Literature
- Suheir Hammad (b. 1973) – poet, author, Palestinian activist
- Michael Henry Heim (1943–2012) – literary translator, fellow of the American Academy of Arts and Sciences
- Tyehimba Jess – Pulitzer Prize-winning poet, College of Staten Island professor
- Charlie Kadau – longtime writer and senior editor for MAD magazine
- Michael Largo – author of mostly non-fiction books, including Final Exits; The Portable Obituary; Genius and Heroin
- Ki Longfellow (1944–2022) – novelist, born on Staten Island; author of The Secret Magdalene
- Lois Lowry (b. 1937) – children's author, two-time Newbery Medal winner
- Brian Plante – writer, best known for science fiction stories
- Darwin Porter (b. 1937) – travel writer and celebrity biographer; lives in New Brighton in the former home of Howard R. Bayne
- Joe Raiola (b. 1955) – longtime writer and senior editor for MAD magazine
- Sarah Schulman (b. 1958) – novelist, playwright, LGBT activist, College of Staten Island professor
- Pam Sherman (b. 1962) – Gannett columnist also known as "The Suburban Outlaw"
- David O. Stewart (b. 1951) – historian and author
- William J. Taverner – sex educator and author; grew up on Staten Island
- Anthony Torrone (b. 1955) – author of Anthony's Prayers, inspired by his years in Willowbrook State School
- Lara Vapnyar (b. 1975) – Russian Jewish emigre writer known for her novels and short stories
- Emanuel Xavier – poet, author, activist

== See also ==
- List of people from New York City
  - List of people from the Bronx
  - List of people from Brooklyn
  - List of people from Manhattan
  - List of people from Queens
- Staten Island Sports Hall of Fame
- Category:College of Staten Island people
- Category:Wagner College people
