= Staten Island Ninja =

American cat burglar

The Staten Island Ninja, also known as the ninja burglar or ninja bandit, is a burglar who broke into homes in the Staten Island borough of New York City and stole from them while dressed as a ninja. He may have hit about nineteen homes since June 2007. He has been described by investigators as a white male, dressed in black and what appears to be a ski mask. He is reported to be between 5 feet 8 inches and 6 feet tall, and weighs roughly 180 pounds. He primarily works at night on Wednesdays, although he has hit during the day and on every other day of the week as well. His target is mainly wealthier homes on Staten Island, particularly in the more affluent neighborhood of Todt Hill.

== Notoriety ==
The Staten Island Ninja had garnered a large response from the general public. While some regard him as a joke, the New York Police Department had found him a serious threat, having dedicated two task forces of 36 officers to his case. There was a $6,000 reward from the city for his capture. The local newspaper, the Staten Island Advance, said the ninja bandit was the number one story of Staten Island for the year 2007.

== Case closed ==
On April 23, 2008 police quietly closed the case after authorities started deportation proceedings against at least one Albanian man believed to be connected to the string of break-ins.

The police department dismantled the team in charge of hunting for the burglar after their forensic and investigative leads were exhausted, but "investigators believe that an individual suspected (but with insufficient evidence to make an arrest) of being the burglar is among three Albanian nationals currently facing deportation because of their illegal status in the United States."

Investigators were first clued into a possible Albanian connection when they learned that several men, from the same area of Albania, had formed a loosely knit group to commit burglaries. One member of the group was arrested in the middle of a Grasmere burglary in November 2007, after the home owner caught him in the middle of the burglary and called the police. A second member was arrested in January 2008, in connection with a May 27, 2007 break-in, after he allegedly left his fingerprints on the scene. His case is still pending, and the federal government has started deportation proceedings against him. Two other members of the group were believed responsible for several of the break-ins in the Ninja Burglar case, but were never charged. Instead, police contacted federal immigration officials who started deportation proceedings against those two members of the group.

Police authorities were reluctant to acknowledge the serial burglar's "Ninja" nickname, and they refer to the spree - which began last May 30th 2007 - simply as "Pattern 16."

Monday, June 16, 2008 marked another reported incident implicating the "Ninja Burglar", this time robbing a Hewlet Harbor home in Long Island.

On August 4, 2009 a robbery on Sabrina Lane, Staten Island was reported as having similarities with the Ninja Burglar’s spree, leading to speculation as to whether the Ninja was correctly identified .
