= Annette D'Agostino Lloyd =

Author and historian on silent film and television

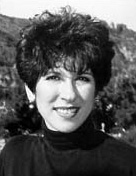
- D'Agostino Lloyd, 2007
- Born: Annette Marie D'Agostino; August 8, 1962 (age 64); Staten Island, New York, U.S.
- Education: St. John's University (New York)
- Occupations: Silent film historian, teacher, legal secretary, administrative assistant
- Years active: 1994–present
- Spouse: Scott Lloyd (1999-present)
- Children: 1

Annette Marie Lloyd (née D'Agostino; born August 8, 1962, Staten Island, New York) is a silent film historian and author of numerous books on silent film and television, particularly on the life and works of actor Harold Lloyd.

Between 2000-05 she was a celebrity biographer and production coordinator at Hollywood Forever Cemetery. She was formerly an adjunct professor of speech communication at Hofstra University and an adjunct professor of communication at William Paterson College.

== Personal life ==
D'Agostino married Scott Lloyd in 1999 but neither she nor her husband are related to actor Harold Lloyd. The couple has one child and reside in Edgewater, Florida.

== Selected works ==
- The Lloyd Herald (Harold Lloyd fan club magazine) (as Annette D'Agostino); self-published (ISSN 1084-8134), 1995-99.
- Harold Lloyd: A Bio-Bibliography (as Annette M. D'Agostino), Greenwood Press 1994; ISBN 0-313-28986-7.
- An Index to Short and Feature Film Reviews in the Moving Picture World: The Early Years, 1907 - 1915 (as Annette M. D'Agostino), Greenwood Press 1995; ISBN 0-313-29381-3.
- Filmmakers in The Moving Picture World: An Index of Articles, 1907-1927 (as Annette M. D'Agostino), McFarland 1997; ISBN 0-7864-0290-3.
- From Soap Stars to Superstars: Celebrities Who Started Out in Daytime Drama (as Annette D'Agostino), Renaissance Books 1999; ISBN 1-58063-075-8.
- Hollywood Forever Cemetery: The Official Directory. A Visit with 135 Stars and Founders of Historic Hollywood (as "Celebrity Biographer: Annette Lloyd, Production Coordinator"), Hollywood Forever Cemetery, 2003.
- The Harold Lloyd Encyclopedia (as Annette D'Agostino Lloyd), McFarland 2004; ISBN 0-7864-1514-2.
- Harold Lloyd's Rogues' Gallery (as Annette D'Agostino Lloyd; private publication), 2005.
- Harold Lloyd: Magic in a Pair of Horn-Rimmed Glasses (as Annette D'Agostino Lloyd), BearManor Media 2009; ISBN 978-1593933326.
- Pass the Gravy (as Annette D'Agostino Lloyd), BearManor Media 2024; ISBN 979-8887716183.

=== Contributing writer/researcher ===
- "Harold Lloyd: A Look at the Legend", The Silent Film Newsletter, Vol. II, No.5, 1994.
- "Harold Lloyd: A Comic Genius Learns Comedy", Classic Images magazine, 1995.
- "Harold Lloyd's Leading Ladies: A Comparative Examination", The Silent Film Monthly, Vol. III, No.6, 1995
- "Silent Film Comedy as Redefined by Harold Lloyd", Films of the Golden Age (magazine), Winter 1997-98.
- Catalog for Screen Snapshots (film series) for Academy of Motion Picture Arts and Sciences, 1998.
- Behind the Planet of the Apes, research, Van Ness Films (video documentary), 1998.
- Lost in Space Forever, research, Van Ness Films (video documentary), 1998.
- "Silent Cinema's Most Normal Guy", from The Hollywood Archive: The Hidden History of Hollywood in the Golden Age, Angel City Press, 2000.
- Silent Film Necrology, 2nd Edition by Eugene Michael Vazzana. (Foreword by Annette D'Agostino Lloyd), McFarland 2001, 0-7864-1059-0.
- Liner Notes from The Harold Lloyd Collection, Vol. 1 (Slapstick Symposium) (as Virginia Lyon), Kino International, 2004.
- Behind the Silver Screen: Stories from Residents of the Motion Picture & Television Fund Retirement Community (as Contributing Writer), Variety Custom Publishing, 2005.
- "The Thrill of It All: The Man Who Dared", Variety, Custom Publishing, Commemorative Issue on Harold Lloyd, 2005.
- "All-American Boy Makes Good: The Life of Harold Lloyd", Variety Custom Publishing, Commemorative Issue on Harold Lloyd, 2005.
- "Sheen on Dean", Variety Custom Publishing, Commemorative Issue on James Dean, 2005.
- A Review of "Flickers of Desire: Movie Stars of the 1910s", Quarterly Review of Film and Video, 30:3, 235-40 (ISSN 1050-9208 [Print], 1543-5326 [Online]), 2013
- "The Moving Picture World: Where Everything Old Is New Again", The Silent Film Quarterly, Fall 2015.
- Bebe Daniels: Hollywood’s Good Little Bad Girl by Charles Epting. (Foreword by Annette D'Agostino Lloyd), McFarland 2016, 978-1-4766-6374-6.

== Documentary appearances ==
- The Welsh in Hollywood. Alfresco TV for ITV (UK), 1999.
- R.I.P.: Great Cemeteries of the World – Hollywood Forever. Minds Eye Entertainment for The Travel Channel, 2002.
- From Soap to Stardom. E! Entertainment TV, 2003.
- Hollywood: Ghosts and Gravesites. Delta Entertainment for The Discovery Channel, 2003
- They Started on Soaps, I, II and III. SOAPNet, 2003.
- Douglas Fairbanks: The Great Swashbuckler. Delta Entertainment (DVD), 2005.
- Rudolph Valentino: The Great Lover. Delta Entertainment (DVD), 2005.
- The Harold Lloyd Comedy Collection. Audio commentary and supplemental material, New Line Home Entertainment, (DVD), 2005; ISBN 0-7806-5288-6.
- The Lot of Fun: Where the Movies Learned to Laugh
- Harold Lloyd: Hollywood's Timeless Comedy Genius
