= Leroy Louis Schwartz =

Leroy Louis Schwartz (1932/33 in Philadelphia – 1997 in Princeton) was a pediatrician who became a noted health policy researcher. He founded the Princeton Institute for Health Policy and the nonprofit Health Policy International in the 1980s, focusing on "issues like unnecessary surgery, substitution of generic drugs for brand-name drugs, marketing infant formula in undeveloped nations, and the misuse of statistics and science in policy debates. He testified at Congressional hearings, [and] wrote widely."

Schwartz was raised in Staten Island, New York, graduating from Wagner College and returning to practice pediatrics after receiving his medical degree from the University of Bern (Switzerland) and completing his residency at Mount Sinai Hospital (Manhattan). At his death in 1997, he was survived by his ex-wife Deidre, three children, and seven grandchildren.
