= Philip S. Straniere =

Philip S. Straniere (born 1947 or 1948 ) is a current civil court judge for the Staten Island Civil Court in New York City, having been elected to the post in 1997.

== Popularity ==
Straniere is known for his humorous opinions and references to popular culture. Filing and Winning Small Claims For Dummies is a guidebook written by him.
