= Matt U Johnson =

- Birth name: Matthew Yohannes Johnson
- Born: October 21, 1992 (age 32); Staten Island, New York, U.S.
- Origin: El Paso, Texas
- Genres: Pop Reggae Dancehall
- Occupations: Singer; Producer; Songwriter
- Instrument: Vocals
- Years active: 2000–present
- Labels: Inner V Music
- Website: mattujmusic.com

Matthew Yohannes Johnson (born October 21, 1992), known professionally as Matt U Johnson, is an American rapper, singer, and songwriter from El Paso, Texas. He released his first single, Get Up feat. Treyy G, in March 2018. He is best known for his single Pon Fire feat Snoop Dogg & Karl Wolf released in 2021. In October 2022, he released the remix to the song which gained him local attention.

== Career ==
Matthew Johnson was born in Staten Island, New York. One of his first performances was at the Neon Desert Music Festival in El Paso in 2018. In 2020, he received local attention for his single Gwan Get it feat. Choclair & Sito Rocks.

== Singles ==
List of singles, showing year released and album name
Title	Year	Album
"Get Up feat. Treyy G."	2018	Non-album single
"Want You"	2018	Non-album single
"Pon Di Road"	2019	Non-album single
"Sexy Wine"	2019	Non-album single
"Bumping & Jamming"	2019	Non-album single
"Gwan Get It"	2020	Non-album single
"Gwan Get It (Remix)"	2020	Non-album single
"A Gwan Get It Christmas"	2020	Non-album single
"Pon Fire"	2021	Non-album single
