= Peter Panzica =

American medical academic (born 1965)

Peter John Panzica (born April 30, 1965, Staten Island, New York) is Director of Anesthesiology at Westchester Medical Center and Chair of the Department of Anesthesiology at New York Medical College.

He was prior Vice Chairman for Clinical Services in the Department of Anesthesia, Critical Care and Pain Medicine at Beth Israel Deaconess Medical Center and an Assistant Professor of Anaesthesia at Harvard Medical School.

Panzica started his career at the former Beth Israel Hospital in 1992 as a resident physician in anesthesia. His previous administrative positions include Director of Thoracic and Transplant Anesthesia and Clinical Director. Boston Magazine included him in their list of anaesthesiologists in their "Best Docs 2007" survey.
