= Edward Hazlehurst =

American architect (1853-1940)

- Edward Hazlehurst in 1902
- Born: Edward Hazlehurst; December 29, 1853; Meade, Kentucky
- Died: January 2, 1915 (aged 61); Nether Providence, Delaware, Pennsylvania
- Education: Faires' Classical Institute
- Occupation: Architect
- Spouse: Dorothy Lammont

Edward Hazlehurst (December 29, 1853-January 2, 1915) was an American architect based in Philadelphia, Pennsylvania. After graduating from the Faires' Classical Institute in Philadelphia, Hazlehurst entered the University of Pennsylvania, Towne Scientific School, in the Class of 1876 but left the college at the close of the first term of his junior year, lured away by work in the offices of such eminent Philadelphia architects as Theophilus P. Chandler Jr. (1874-1876?) and Frank Furness (1876-1881). By 1881 he and Samuel Huckel, Jr. had established Hazlehurst & Huckel. A successful residential design firm, Hazlehurst & Huckel endured until 1900, when Huckel received the commission to remodel Grand Central Station in New York City; and the partnership dissolved. Although Huckel returned to Philadelphia in 1901/02, the partners did not reunite; and Hazlehurst pursued an independent career until his death in Nether Providence, PA, in 1915. After his partnership with Huckel was dissolved, Hazlehurst's later career included considerable academic work, among the commissions four buildings at Pennsylvania State College from 1902 to 1915.

Hazlehurst joined the Philadelphia Chapter of the American Institute of Architects in 1875 as a junior member, becoming a full member in 1879. He joined the national AIA in 1881 and in the 1883/84 academic year served as judge of the annual architectural drawing competition held at Spring Garden Institute.

== Personal life and family ==
Edward Hazlehurst, son of John and Elizabeth Dunlap Blithe Hazlehurst was born in Meade County, Kentucky on December 29, 1853. He was baptized on 30 December 1855 at Church of the Mediator (Episcopal), Philadelphia. He married Dolores Lammot, daughter of Daniel and Dolores Lammot, at St. Stephen's Church, Philadelphia, on 28 November 1883. Hazlehurst died on 2 January 1915 in Nether Providence, Delaware, Pennsylvania Edward and Dolores Hazlehurst had two children:

- Edward. Born—November 1892 and died 8 November 1892
- Edward. Born 10 Feb 1895 in Philadelphia and died 25 November 1955 in Booton, Morris, NJ

== Projects ==
- Battery Park Hotel, Asheville, North Carolina
- Ag Hill Complex, Penn State University campus, State College, Pennsylvania
- Fourth Presbyterian Church, Philadelphia
