= New Dorp High School =

Public school in New York City

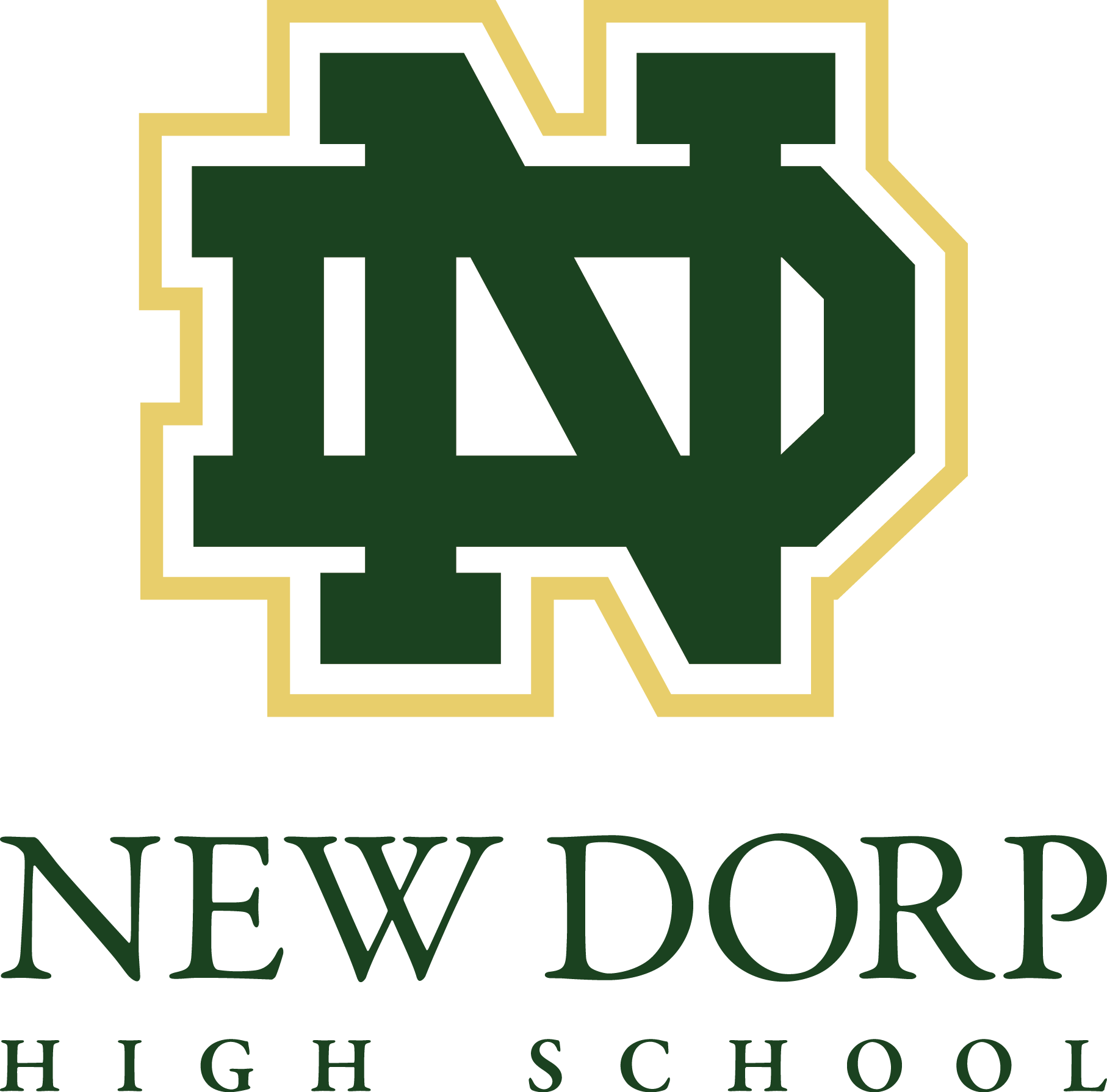

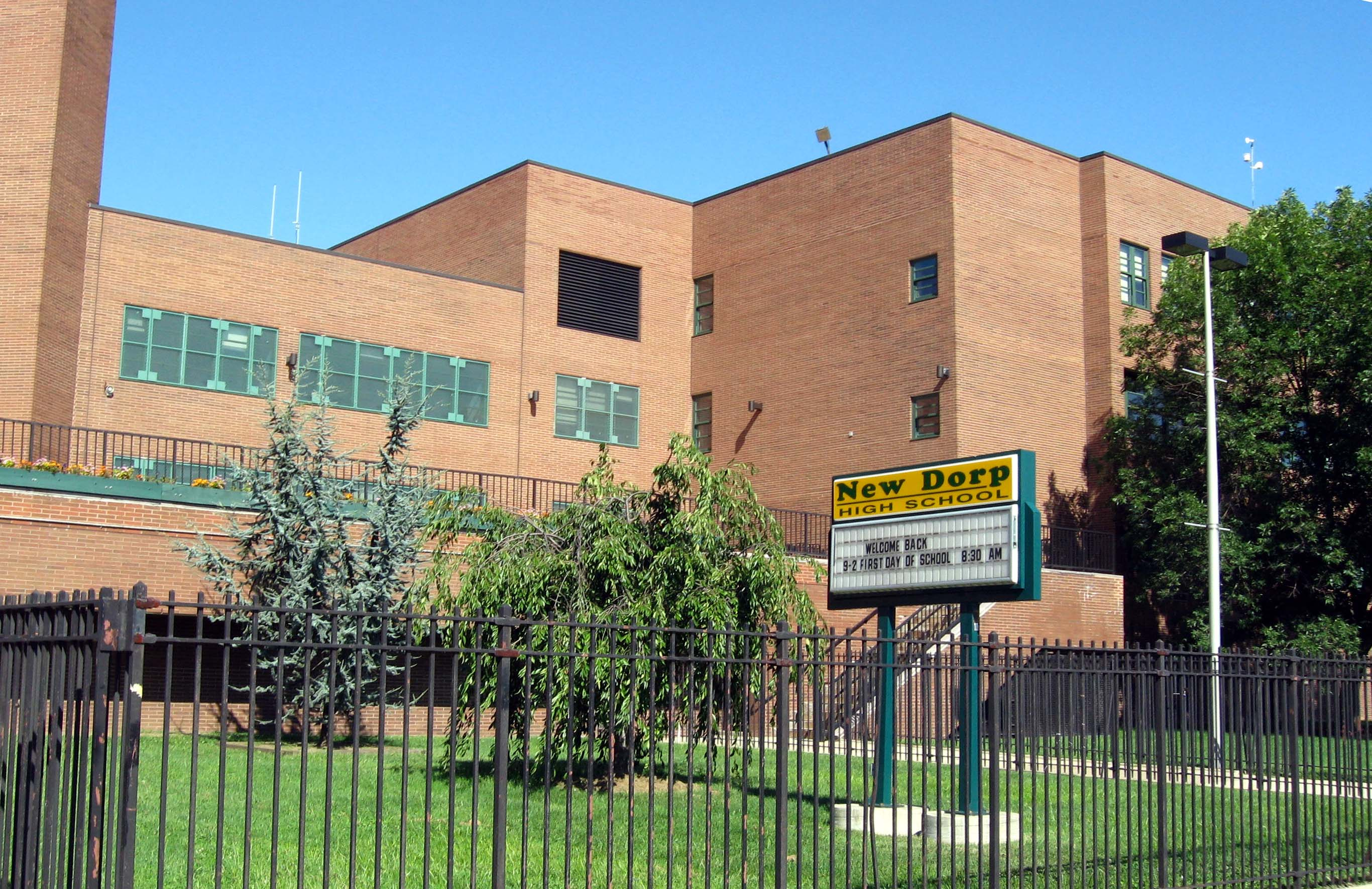

Location
- 465 New Dorp Lane; Staten Island, New York 10306; United States; 40°34′12″N 74°6′26″W

Information
- Type: Public
- Established: 1937; 89 years ago
- School district: New York City Department of Education
- NCES School ID: 360010302035
- Principal: Seth Schoenfeld
- Teaching staff: 221.11 (on an FTE basis)
- Grades: 9-12
- Enrollment: 3,164 (2022-2023)
- Student to teacher ratio: 14.31
- Campus: City: Large
- Colors: Green and Gold
- Mascot: Cougars
- Yearbook: Argonaut
- Website: www.newdorphs.org

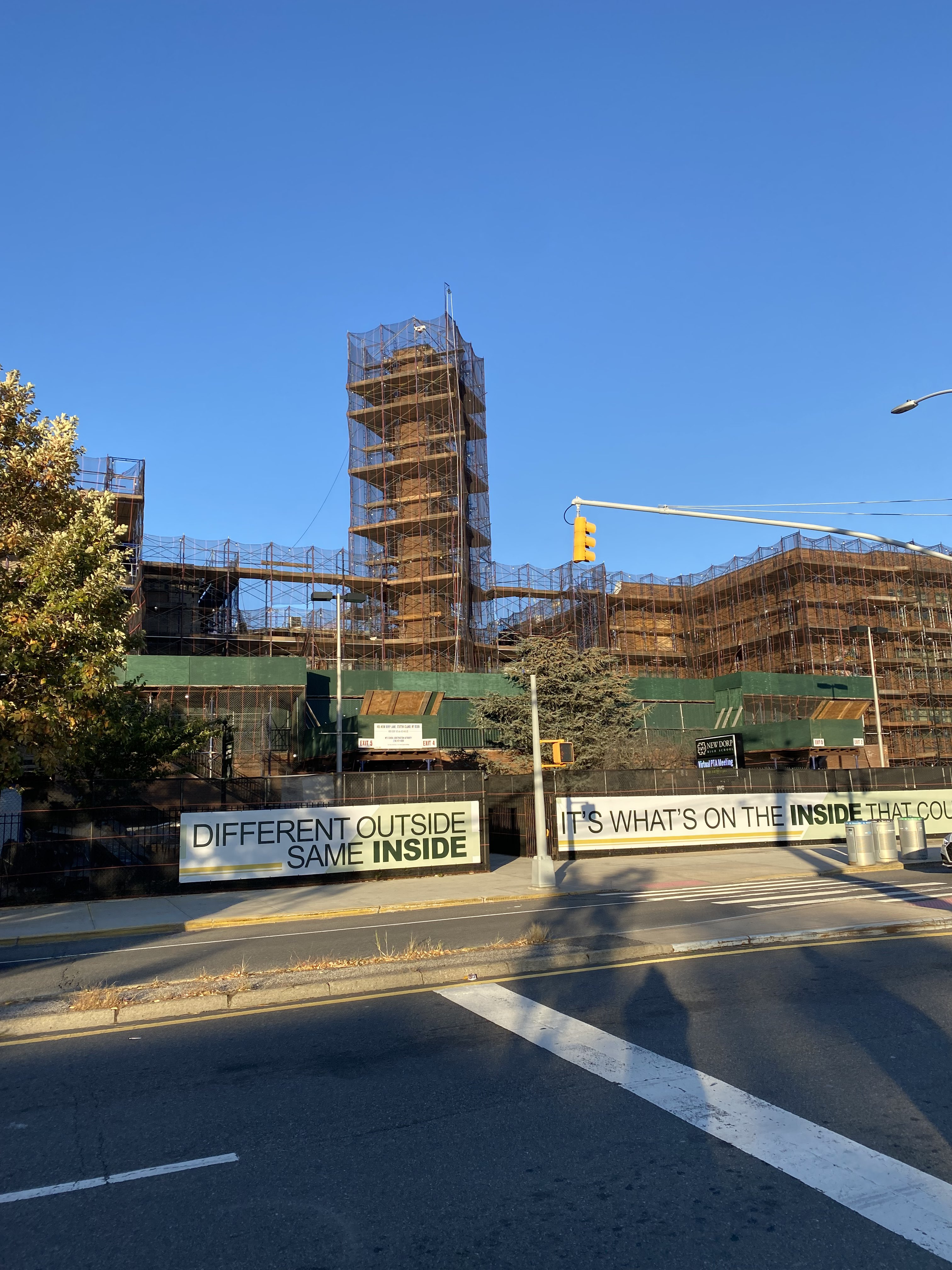
New Dorp High School undergoing renovations in October 2022

New Dorp High School, commonly referred to as New Dorp or NDHS, is a public school on the East Shore of the New York City borough of Staten Island in the New Dorp neighborhood. The school is administered by the New York City Department of Education. The school is located at 465 New Dorp Lane next to Miller Field, an army airport turned park, which extends to the Lower New York Bay. New Dorp High School is located in Region 7, which encompasses all of Staten Island and portions of southwest Brooklyn.

== History ==
New Dorp High School was originally located in a smaller campus on Clawson Street. Established in 1937, local officials had planned for a high school in the area as early as 1922, per the Staten Island Advance's archives. This building, built on land deeded from Miller Field, follows the NYC public school architecture trends of the time, with long bricks covering the entire building, and an institutional appearance that has led to misinformation that the school building was once a hospital or a prison. On the inside, the design is very similar to schools on Staten Island from the 1950s onward, with the same tiling and doors as most public elementary, middle, and high schools in that date range. Its division into four wings helps organize the smaller learning communities, and its layout promotes speedy arrival to classes.

Due to the growing population in the area, the school was moved to its current, larger building in 1982. The Clawson Street campus was taken over by the engineering program of Ralph R. McKee Vocational and Technical High School, which eventually spun off to become Staten Island Technical High School in 1988.

New Dorp has had many programs over the years, from the defunct classical guitar ensemble, marching band, and Spectrum magazine to the current SING Musical Theater competition, Black Box Theatre, International Festival, the ever-popular Comic-Con, and the annual Spring Musical. For over 80 years, students have taken part in Chorus class, and participated in the school's yearbook, Argonaut.

In 2015, filming for the movie Nerve, starring Emma Roberts, took place in parts of the school and football field.

== Education ==
All students are enrolled in a certain House, or program within the high school. Students chose which "House" they would prefer while applying to high schools. Each "House" or "SLC" (Smaller Learning Community) focuses on a certain subject area. These programs include:

- The Law Institute & AFJROTC Program
- The Math and Science Institute
- Academy of Education & Leadership
- Institute of Health Sciences
- Institute of Forensic Science & Criminology
- Corporate Center for Business & Technology
- Academy of Fine & Dramatic Arts
- Academy of Communications & Media Arts

Students are required to achieve a passing grade on 5 New York State Regents exams. Advanced Placement courses are offered in Biology, Calculus AB, English Literature, World History, and US History. There are also plans to introduce AP courses in Computer Science and Statistics. College extension programs are available; these are classes that college credit is offered, but it is given from a specific college rather than through an AP test. College extension classes include Anatomy & Physiology, Pre-Calc, Spanish, and Italian. New Dorp High School has partnerships with local colleges including CUNY College of Staten Island, CUNY Kingsborough Community College, St. John's University, and Polytechnic Institute of New York University.

In 2012, The Atlantic magazine highlighted the effectiveness of the school's emphasis on essay-writing skills: "an overwhelming focus on teaching the basics of analytic writing, every day, in virtually every class. What followed was an extraordinary blossoming of student potential, across nearly every subject—one that has made New Dorp a model for educational reform."

== Sculpture at the entrance ==
At the main entrance of New Dorp High School stands a large aluminum sculpture by Bill Barrett. Titled "Hari IV", it was constructed in 1982 and measures 32 feet in height, 28 feet in width, and 16 feet in diameter. The sculpture represents a student with a book, but it is often misunderstood as looking like an elephant. It is a common congregating area for students, as well as a prominent feature of the school campus. Michael Brenson of The New York Times in 1988 described it as "one of the most successful public sculptures in the city".

== Notable alumni ==
- Eric Blackwood (born Eric Pastore), musician
- Mickey Burns, television host and writer
- Frank Ferrara, football player
- Nick Fotiu, hockey player
- Maura Harty, United States Assistant Secretary of State for Consular Affairs
- Inspectah Deck, rapper, member of the Wu-Tang Clan
- Bill Jankunis, Olympian high jumper
- Florina Kaja, reality TV star
- Sukanya Krishnan, news anchor
- Jerome H. Lemelson, inventor and philanthropist
- Robert Loggia, actor
- Nicole Malliotakis, Member of the U.S. House of Representatives from New York's 11th district
- Method Man, rapper, member of the Wu-Tang Clan
- Hurvin McCormack, former NFL player
- Guy Molinari, former United States Representative and borough president
- A. J. Pero, drummer with band Twisted Sister
- Raekwon, rapper, member of the Wu-Tang Clan
- Remedy (born Ross Filler), rapper
- Ronen Rubinstein, actor
- Les Schneider, former U.S. Air Force officer and pilot, known for Gemini 8 rescue mission
- Mike Siani, former professional American football player
- Kevin Sussman, actor
- Mikhail Varshavski (also known as "Doctor Mike"), physician and social media personality
