= Tottenville High School =

Public school in New York City

Location
- 100 Luten Ave; Staten Island, New York 10312; United States; 40°31′40″N 74°11′33″W

Information
- Type: Public
- Established: 1898
- School district: New York City Department of Education - District 31
- School number: 31R455
- NCES School ID: 360010302883
- Principal: Gina Battista
- Teaching staff: 242.07 (on an FTE basis)
- Grades: 9-12
- Enrollment: 3,797 (2023-2024)
- Student to teacher ratio: 15.69
- Campus: City: Large
- Colors: Purple and White
- Slogan: "Where Excellence Meets Opportunity"
- Athletics conference: PSAL
- Mascot: Pirates
- Newspaper: The Pirateer
- Yearbook: Palantir
- Website: www.tottenvillehs.org

Tottenville High School is located at 100 Luten Avenue, in Huguenot, Staten Island, New York. Tottenville H.S. is in Administrative District 31, and is operated by the New York City Department of Education. The school's principal is Gina Battista, who assumed the role in 2020.

Tottenville H.S. is within walking distance of the Huguenot station of the Staten Island Railway system, providing students easy access to public transportation. There are also multiple Staten island bus stops surrounding the area.

== History ==
Tottenville High School was established in 1898. Tottenville High School was originally located in the building now home to Totten Intermediate School 34 (I.S. 34). In 1937, Dr. Mary E. Meade was appointed principal of the school, becoming the first female principal of a NYC co-educational high school. In 1972, the school moved to its current location in Huguenot. In November 1987, Tottenville was selected as a "School of Excellence" by the U.S. Department of Education.

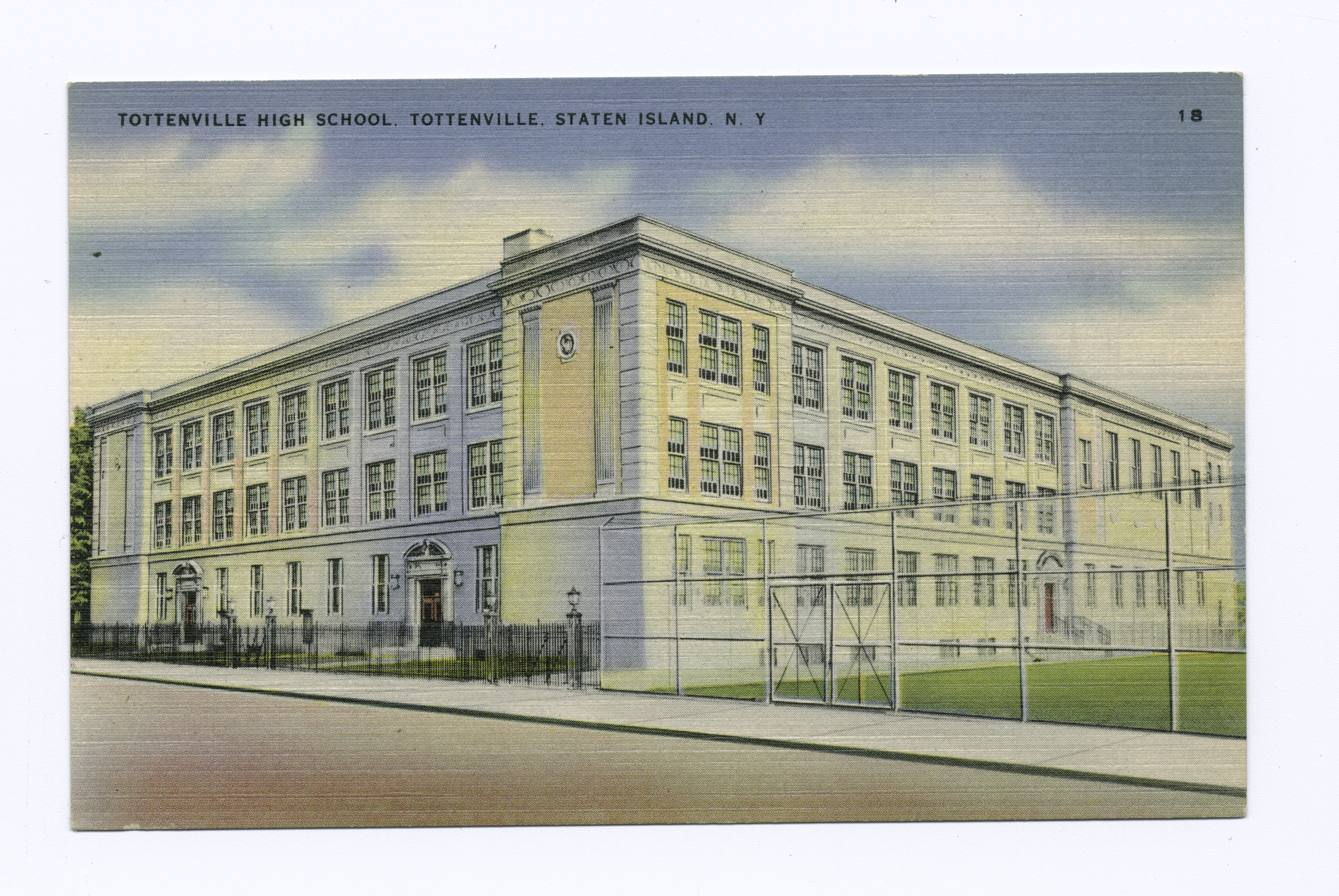

John P. Tuminaro was principal from 1999 until his retirement in June 2013. Joseph Scarmato took over as principal from 2014 to 2019.

Paul Zindel, a Pulitzer Prize-winning playwright and novelist. taught science from 1959 to 1969.

In the mid-1990s, Tottenville High School received twin murals titled Ancient and Modern Commerce (1918 A.J. Bogdanove) which were removed from Paul Robeson HS and restored. The murals can be seen in the Concert Hall.

In 2006, scenes for Little Children were filmed at the school and on the football field.

== Overview ==
The student population is approximately 3,749 (2024-2025).

Tottenville High School offers Regents level classes in Algebra, Algebra II & Trigonometry, American History, Chemistry, Earth Science, English, Geometry, Global History, Italian, Living Environment, Physics & Spanish.

Tottenville also offers CTE (Career and Technical Education) courses in Dental Laboratory and Dental Office Careers, CISCO networking academy and Automotive Technology.

Students have opportunities for paid internships with professional mentors, advanced post-secondary certifications, and college credit.

Advanced Placement Classes offered at Tottenville include: U.S. History, Biology, Computer Science Principles, Computer Science A, Calculus AB, Calculus BC, Chemistry, English Language and Composition, English Literature & Composition, Physics 1, Psychology, U.S. Government & Politics, and World History.

College Credit Classes (from St. John's University) include: College Pre-Calculus and foreign language courses.

The Racial/Ethnic Demographics are approximately: 2,279 White (61%), 687 Hispanic or Latino (18%), 602 Asian/Pacific Islander (16%), 83 African American (2%), 81 Multiracial (2%), and 17 American Indian (1%).

== Programs ==
The Institute Programs: The Institute program allows for academically gifted students to take an accelerated course load. All institute students are required to maintain an overall average of 88% and higher. Students are accepted to either the Science Institute or Classics Institute, depending on their academic interests.

College Now: Students at Tottenville are eligible to take College Now classes from either The College of Staten Island or Kingsborough Community College on site. Successful completion of these courses allows students to obtain college credit. Students can also travel to the College of Staten Island for other College Now courses.

Academy of Finance: The Academy of Finance is a partner of the National Academy Foundation, which provides a business oriented education for interested students.

Science-orientated programs, including a Medical Technology Program, Dental Program, Robotics & Independent Research, offer Tottenville students opportunities gain to work in a research laboratory.

Tottenville claims a large musical offering: Jazz Band, Symphonic Band, Symphonic Orchestra, Concert Choir (SATB), Concert Band, Intermediate Band, Intermediate Orchestra, Beginning Band, Beginning Strings, Guitar, Piano, Music Theory, Women's Chorus, and Vocal Training Chorus. The Tottenville Marching Band is a highly respected ensemble, performing at USBands competitions and in parades and civic events throughout the New York City Metropolitan area. In 2018 the Tottenville Marching Band won the USBands Group 6A New York State Championship.

The Marching Band annually tours to Florida for performances in Walt Disney World's Magic Kingdom and Epcot, as well as performances at Universal's CityWalk, SeaWorld Orlando, Busch Gardens Tampa and more. In 2014 the band performed in the 88th Annual Macy's Thanksgiving Day Parade as part of the Sino-American Culture and Arts Foundation. Members of the Tottenville HS Concert Choir were featured back-up singers for the Neon Tree's single, "Your Surrender", aired on Late Night with David Letterman (May 5, 2011).

The New York State School Music Association (NYSSMA) Adjudication Festival has been hosted at Tottenville High School since 1990. This festival attracts performing groups and soloists from area public and private schools wishing to be evaluated by NYS-recognized educational entity. In the 2011 festival, the award of "Gold with Distinction" for the highest level of difficulty (Level VI) was awarded to Tottenville's Symphonic Band, Tottenville's Jazz Band, and Tottenville's Symphonic Orchestra.

The three-year Architecture Program is a sequence offering Technical Drawing, Interior Design, Architecture, pre-Engineering and AutoCAD. Students gain hands-on experience creating designs using t-squares, triangles, and AutoCAD technology. Many students participate in internship programs with NYC architects.

The Culinary Program offers students opportunities to pursue a three-year (Career & Technical Education certified) sequence in a fully operational kitchen and dining room. The "Pirates Cafe" offers a full menu (prepared and served by students) to faculty and staff twice monthly. Many graduates have received culinary scholarships to major culinary arts colleges and work in the industry.

Tottenville students in the Architecture Program created a solar-powered automobile using AutoCAD software and raced in the Summer of 2011 in Texas.

The United States Marine Corps JROTC Unit is an integral and highly visible component of Tottenville life. The cadets actively train in the fundamentals of leadership, citizenship, physical fitness, and military skills. They are visible in community and school events. A Memorial Day commemoration in the school's courtyard, featuring a solemn flag-folding and wreath-laying ceremony, was attended by veterans, active military personnel, faculty, staff and students.

== Student activities ==
Tottenville has extensive extracurricular programs covering a wide range of interest. The Council for Unity and Student Government are available for students interested in taking a leadership role in the school. The Tottenville Key Club’s focus is on community and school service. Academic Clubs include the National Honor Society and award-winning teams include the Lincoln–Douglas debate, Math Team, Mock Trial team and National Junior Classical League.

In addition, Tottenville High School has a FIRST Robotics Competition team, FRC Team #1396, the "Pyrobots." The robotics team appeals to students who are interested in the science, technology, engineering and mathematics (STEM) field. Students are given six weeks to build a fully functional robot to meet that year's challenge. At the conclusion of the six weeks, the robotics team competes in the NYC Regional at the Jacob Javits Convention Center in Manhattan, NY for three consecutive days.

A spring musical is produced annually. In addition, each year, the sophomore, freshmen, junior, and senior classes write and stage their own musicals in a competition called "SING!".

Tottenville's Athletics Teams (PSAL Sport) include: Baseball (Boys), Softball (Girls), Basketball, Bowling, Cross Country, Fencing, Football (Boys), Golf, Gymnastics (Boys and Girls), Handball, Indoor Track, Outdoor Track, Lacrosse, Soccer, Swimming, Tennis, Volleyball, Wrestling (Boys)

In 2009, the Girls Varsity Softball team has won its 6th consecutive PSAL Championship.

In 2011, the Girls Varsity Lacrosse team completed an undefeated season and won the PSAL championship title.

== Notable alumni ==
- Mabel Normand (class of 1911), silent film actress, director, writer, producer; frequent collaborator with Charlie Chaplin
- Helen Clevenger (class of 1934), college student murdered in 1936.
- Julie Bowers (class of 1944), baseball player
- Glen Richardson (class of 1945), baseball player
- Patrick Breen (class of 1978), actor, writer
- Mike Bocchetti (class of 1979), stand-up comedian and radio personality
- Pam Sherman (class of 1980), columnist known as The Suburban Outlaw
- Rich Scheid (class of 1983), professional baseball player
- Abdul Shamsid-Deen (class of 1986), basketball player
- Joe Andruzzi (class of 1993), NFL offensive lineman, three-time Super Bowl champion
- Tom Gregorio (class of 1995), professional baseball player and coach for the Anaheim Angels
- Rockell (class of 1995), singer
- Ricco Rodriguez (class of 1995), professional mixed martial arts fighter, UFC Heavyweight Champion1998 and 1999 gold medalist for ADCC Submission Wrestling World Championship
- Jason Marquis (class of 1996), All-Star pitcher for Colorado Rockies; pitched Tottenville Pirates to New York City Public Schools Athletic League titles in 1995 and 1996
- Adewale Ogunleye (class of 1996), NFL defensive lineman 2000–2010
- Emmanuel Akah (class of 1997), AFL offensive lineman
- Melanie Iglesias (class of 2005), model and TV actress
- Bebe Rexha (class of 2007), singer and songwriter
- Zack Granite (class of 2010), professional baseball player for the Minnesota Twins and New York Yankees
- Gus Edwards (class of 2013), Baltimore Ravens running back
- Nakye Sanders (class of 2015), basketball player
- Eric O'Neill (class of 2021), football player
