= Glen Richardson (baseball) =

American baseball player

- Second baseman
- Born: April 18, 1927; Bayonne, New Jersey
- Died: October 12, 2017 (aged 90)
- Batted: Right Threw: Right

Negro league baseball debut
- 1946, for the New York Black Yankees

Last appearance
- 1947, for the New York Black Yankees

Teams
- New York Black Yankees (1946–1947)

Glemby Alvin "Glen" Richardson (April 18, 1927 – October 12, 2017), born "Glemby Alvin Mosley", was an American Negro league second baseman in the 1940s.

A native of Bayonne, New Jersey, Richardson attended Tottenville High School, and played for the New York Black Yankees in 1946 and 1947. He was inducted into the Staten Island Sports Hall of Fame in 2014, and died in 2017 at age 90.
