= Staten Island Sports Hall of Fame =

- Established: 1995
- Location: Mount Loretto; CYO/MIV Recreation Center; 6450 Hylan Blvd. Staten Island, New York; United States
- Coordinates: 40°30′38″N 74°13′05″W
- Type: Non-profit: sports
- Chairperson: Tony Santo

The Staten Island Sports Hall of Fame mission is "to recognize those individuals who have made extraordinary contributions to Staten Island sports history, and by virtue of their accomplishments, service, or force of character, have enriched that history for all time.”

The first Staten Island Sports Hall of Fame induction ceremony was conducted at the College of Staten Island's Williamson Theatre in 1995 when 11 recipients were honored in recognition of their noteworthy accomplishments.

== Inductees ==
=== Class of 1995 ===
- Jim Albus
- Terry Crowley
- Joan Gumb
- Abel Kiviat
- Rich Kotite
- Hank Majeski
- Oscar Michaud
- Elmer Ripley
- Mike Siani
- Sal Somma
- Bobby Thomson

=== Class of 1996 ===
- George Bamberger
- Andy Barberi
- Heyward Dotson
- John Engles
- Nick Fotiu
- Jack Hynes
- Bill Jankunis
- Dennis McKnight
- Bill Shakespeare
- Sheila Tighe

=== Class of 1997 ===
- Bill Britton
- Gloria Cordes Elliott
- Jack McGinley
- Ben McNevich
- Dominick Minicucci
- Fred Muche
- Harry O’Brien

=== Class of 1998 ===
- Larry Bearnarth
- Dino Mangiero
- Jim Mutrie
- Robert Pipkins
- Hal Squier
- Edna Hanley Strachan
- Bill Welsh

=== Class of 1999 ===
- Dennis Barrett
- Bob (Sonny) Bosley
- Mary Outerbridge
- Jeanine Radice
- Tom Tierney
- 1964 Mid-Island Little League All Star Team

=== Class of 2000 ===
- Nick Bruno
- Carolyn Cassidy Cudone
- Frank Fernandez
- Sue Harnett
- James Jenkins
- John Quinn
- Jack Tracy
- 1987 Wagner College Football Team

=== Class of 2001 ===
- Dan Blaine
- Karl Drews
- Warren Fenley
- Bert Levinson
- Matty Mcintyre
- Tom Roche
- Claude Schoenlank
- Vernon Turner
- Msgr. Farrell's 1974 2-Mile Relay

=== Class of 2002 ===
- Darlene Crowe
- Charlie Marsala
- Ken Page
- Geraldine Saintilus
- Ben Sarullo
- Jack Taylor

=== Class of 2003 ===
- Cliff Brantley
- John D’Amato
- Sebastian “Sonny” Grasso
- Francis “Buddy” O'Grady
- Shannon Payne

=== Class of 2004 ===
- Jack Donovan
- Larry Napp
- Lou Marli
- Joe Ryan
- 1983 St. Peter's Boys’ Varsity Basketball Team

=== Class of 2005 ===
- Cathy Andruzzi
- Teddy Atlas
- Frank Genovese
- George Genovese
- Walter Scholl
- Lynn Tighe
- Pete Whitehouse

=== Class of 2006 ===
- Jimmy Collins
- Sonny Logan
- Al Paturzo
- Jim Signorile
- John Tobin
- John Wolyniec

=== Class of 2007 ===
- Joe Andruzzi
- Al Fabbri
- Matt Galante
- Johnny Johnson
- Sonny Ruberto
- Ray Rudolph

=== Class of 2008 ===
- Nicky Anosike
- John Franco
- Sudsy Monchik
- Kevin O’Connor
- Fred Ragucci

=== Class of 2009 ===
- Bob Bertucci
- Artie Evans
- Robin Jackson
- Adewale Ogunleye
- Ed Perpetua
- Lewis Sanders
- Matty White

=== Class of 2010 ===
- Dom LaBargo
- Jason Marquis
- Jack Minogue
- Mickey Sullivan
- Tuck Turner
- Charlie Wonsowicz

=== Class of 2011 ===
- Kevin Coyle
- Frank Menechino

=== Class of 2012 ===
- Larry Anderson
- Dan Boylan Sr
- Jen Derevjanik
- Art Hall
- Kyle McAlarney
- Dan McDermott
- Fred Olivieri

=== Class of 2013 ===
- Marilyn King
- Lance Olssen
- Tony Petosa
- Jay Price

=== Class of 2014 ===
- Aileen Aponte
- Leon Brown
- Bob Daggett
- Steve Gregory
- Frank Hannigan
- Pete Meurer
- Glemby (Glen) Mosley
- Bill Murtha
- Ken Strong

=== Class of 2015 ===
- Bill Cali
- Vic Esposito
- Nick Kvasic
- Frank McConville
- Eric Olsen

=== Class of 2016 ===
- Karin Muller Crowley
- John Hagemann
- Gerry Lawless
- Pete Pullara
- John Semerad
- Ed Sorge
- Leslie Stahl

=== Class of 2017 ===
- Mike Gilsenan
- Ron Isler
- Kevin Jermyn
- Brenda Jordan
- Karl McCoy
- Gabe Perillo

=== Class of 2018 ===
- John Drebinger
- Cathy Morano
- Bobby Rodriguez
- Howie Ruppert
- Dr. Mark Sherman
- Staten Island Little League Founders
- Bob Steele
- Steven F. Zuntag

=== Class of 2019 ===
- Harvey Araton
- Tony Canzoneri
- Walt Hameline
- Tony Rafaniello
- Anthony Varvaro
- Herb White

=== Class of 2020 ===
- Nick Bilotti
- Larry Cubas
- Frankie Genaro
- Jack Hurley
- Karen Lynch
- Rich Scheid
- Silvestri's national softball champions

=== Class of 2021 ===
- No inductions

=== Class of 2022 ===
- Lou Anarumo Jr.
- Julie Bowers
- Mickey Burns
- Jesse Carlin
- Greg Pedro
- James Sparrow
- Bill Wolfe

=== Class of 2023 ===
- Saidu Ezike
- Stephan Khinoy
- L&M Tavern
- Margaret Nabel
- Jeff Stoutland
- Andrew Wisniewski

== See also ==
- List of halls and walks of fame § Sports
- List of people from Staten Island § Sports
- Sports in the New York metropolitan area
- Staten Island § Sports
