= Les Schneider =

United States Air Force rescue pilot and civilian airline pilot

Birthdate	December 13, 1939
Hometown	Woodstock, New York, U.S.
Education	U.S. Air Force Academy, B.S. 1961
Medals	Distinguished Flying Cross

Leslie George Schneider (born December 13, 1939) grew up in Woodstock and Staten Island, New York. He and his younger brother Wayne were raised by their grandmother and grandfather. He attended New Dorp High School from 1953 to 1957 and was captain of the school's undefeated PSAL championship football team in 1956 and attended the United States Air Force Academy in Colorado Springs from 1957 to 1961. Shortly thereafter he began his tour of duty in Vietnam as the captain of search and rescue missions ("Crown Rescue") using C-54 and HC-130 Hercules Aircraft.

Following Vietnam, Les began as a flight engineer for Trans World Airlines (TWA). He then transferred to Saudi Airlines and spent seven years there where he learned Arabic and earned his gemologist degree. Upon return to the United States, he flew for TWA until his retirement in 1997 as a DC-9 captain.

== Gemini 8 ==
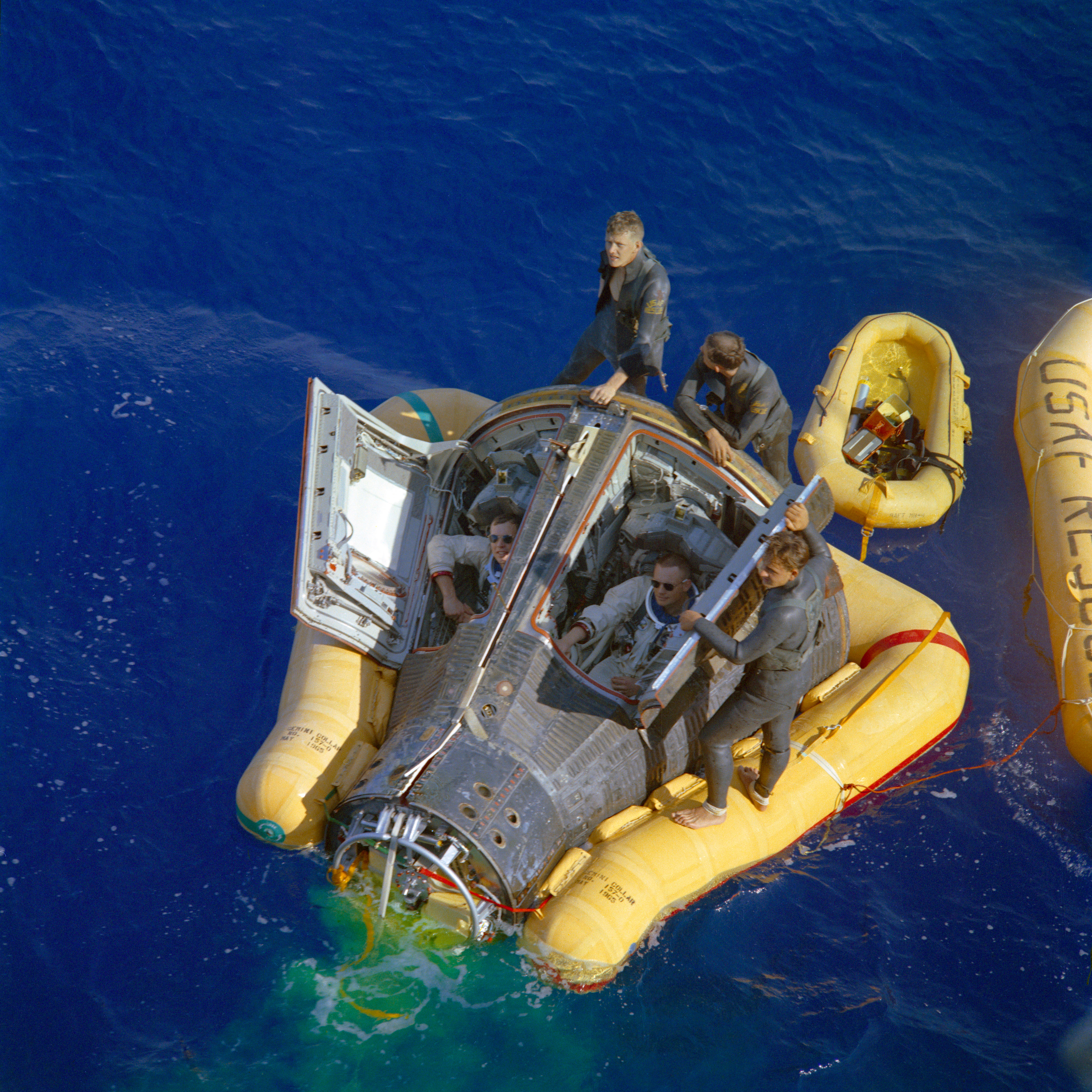
The Amphibious Crew of Naha Rescue One

Les Schneider's most significant professional achievement occurred on March 16, 1966. He and his 10-man sea rescue crew aboard Naha Rescue One (a C-54 Skymaster aircraft) were on emergency alert to rescue the Gemini 8 capsule containing Neil Armstrong and David Scott in case of an emergency re-entry.

Mechanical problems forced Armstrong to do just that: he had to perform an emergency re-entry into the East China Sea. Schneider was the pilot who saw the descent of the capsule; three pararescuers jumped from his plane and attached a flotation collar.

Although not as well known as the Apollo 13 rescue, the Gemini 8 rescue proved to have great importance, since it was Armstrong who would be the one to first step onto the moon.

== Sources ==
- On The Shoulders of Titans, Chapter 13
- American Heritage Magazine, December 1992
- Interview with Les Schneider
