= Helen Clevenger =

American murder victim (1917–1936)

Helen J. Clevenger
- Born: November 4, 1917; Washington, D.C.
- Died: July 16, 1936; Asheville, North Carolina
- Cause of death: Gun shot

Helen Clevenger (November 4, 1917 – July 16, 1936) was an American college student who was murdered in Asheville, North Carolina, on July 16, 1936. She was a member of the Baháʼí Faith.

== Early life and education ==
Helen Irene Clevenger was born on November 4, 1917, in Washington, D.C., to Joseph F. Clevenger and Mary (née Desbach or Dresbach). Both parents were born in Ohio and were married in 1902 in Columbus, where they were employed as teachers. Joseph Clevenger conducted scientific work on fungi, publishing a study of Phyllachora species in 1905, as well as an article on the use of hydrochloric acid in slide preparation.

The couple had two infant children who died in 1910 and 1915 while living in Chicago and later in Ohio. During their time in Chicago, Joseph was employed as a teacher at a college. By 1918, he was working in Washington, D.C., with the Pharmacognosy Laboratory of the Department of Chemistry in the United States Department of Agriculture, where he frequently published with Clare Olin Ewing until her departure in 1919. He registered for the World War I draft on September 12, 1918, while residing on 5th Street NW and working for the Bureau of Chemistry.

In 1920, the Clevenger family remained at the same address, sharing their residence with three boarders. Joseph continued his work with the Pharmacognosy Laboratory through 1925. In 1927, he created a map depicting the travels of the Báb and Bahá’u’lláh, founders of the Bahá'í Faith, which was published in The Bahá'í World, Volume 2, with the approval of Shoghi Effendi, then head of the Bahá'í Faith.

By 1930, the Clevengers were living on Howton Avenue in the Great Kills neighborhood of Staten Island, New York City, where Joseph was employed as a federal scientist. By 1932, he was a pharmacognosist at the New York Station of the Federal Food and Drug Administration, a position he held at least until 1935.

Helen Clevenger was raised in the Bahá'í Faith, the religion practiced by her family. She graduated from Tottenville High School in 1934, where she served as editor-in-chief of the school publication The Digest, was a member of the honor society Arista, and was named valedictorian. She also received a certificate for participation in a New York mathematics competition and was announced on July 1, 1936, as one of 39 students awarded scholarships to New York University for the 1936–1937 academic year. She enrolled at New York University with plans to pursue a career in chemistry.

== Death and aftermath ==
Clevenger traveled to Asheville, North Carolina, in 1936 to visit relatives. Her father later stated that he had arranged the trip "for fear I was binding my daughter too much to my life and my ideas" and that she was traveling with her uncle, William Leander Clevenger (1881–1951), a professor at North Carolina State College.

While staying at the Battery Park Hotel in Asheville, Clevenger was found murdered on July 16, 1936, at approximately 1:00 a.m. Her death certificate recorded the cause of death as a gunshot wound inflicted by a .32-caliber bullet. Contemporary reports described severe facial injuries. At the time of her death, she was wearing a Bahá'í ring bearing the ringstone symbol, reflecting her association with the Bahá'í Faith.

The murder received widespread media attention in the United States and abroad. By late July 1936, extensive coverage had appeared in national newspapers, and inquiries were made by Bahá'í community members in New York. International interest followed, with reports that London and European newspapers also covered the case.

The investigation involved numerous interviews with witnesses and suspects. Eventually, a 22-year-old Black hotel night janitor, Martin Moore, who was relatively new to his position, was arrested and charged with the murder. Moore signed a written confession but later stated that it had been coerced through beatings by detectives. Despite his claims of innocence, he was convicted and executed in the gas chamber at Raleigh, North Carolina, on December 11, 1936.

Details surrounding the confession and re-enactment were covered extensively by the press. The case continued to draw attention, and a multi-page review was published in 1942.

Clevenger’s mother Mary died in 1943, and her father died in 1945. In a later scholarly analysis, historian Dr. Gael Graham of Western Carolina University observed that the case was marked by irony, noting that the rapid conviction and execution of Moore contrasted sharply with the Bahá'í Faith’s principles of racial equality, which had guided Clevenger’s upbringing and beliefs.

=== Dramatizations ===
Dramatizations of Clevenger’s murder appeared soon after the incident. Beginning in October 1936, accounts were published in true crime magazines, including True Detective. A version of the case, written with the approval of the sheriff, was later adapted for radio and broadcast in April and July 1937. The events were also the subject of a stage play written in 2014.

== Modern interest ==
Literature on the Clevenger case includes references to ghost stories that describe her as haunting the site of her death, the Battery Park Hotel (now the Battery Park Apartments). In 2010, the Asheville "Tourism Center and Free Museum" operated by Joshua P. Warren, featured an exhibit on the Clevenger case as an unsolved murder. In 2016, Anne Chesky Smith of the University of Georgia presented academic work on the murder, trial, and execution of Martin Moore.

The Asheville Citizen-Times has mentioned the case in several articles, including in 2015 and 2019. The New York Daily Times also referred to the case in 2017. That same year, speculation arose suggesting the murder may have been a case of mistaken identity, and the case was referenced in a short-fiction contest story. The Southern Mysteries podcast discussed the case in 2019, as did two other history-focused programs, with a third feature following in 2020.

In 2021, Chesky Smith published a scholarly study of the case, examining the murder, trial, a likely suspect, and the subsequent fate of Martin Moore and his remains. In 2023, a peer-reviewed journal article provided a biographical account of Clevenger’s early life, her family’s participation in Bahá’í communities in Washington, D.C., and New York City, and the religious norms within which they lived.
