= Julie Bowers =

American baseball catcher (1926-1977)

- Catcher
- Born: February 27, 1926; Staten Island, New York, U.S.
- Died: February 28, 1977 (aged 51); Staten Island, New York, U.S.
- Batted: Right Threw: Right

Negro league baseball debut
- 1946, for the New York Black Yankees

Last appearance
- 1950, for the New York Black Yankees
- Stats at Baseball Reference

Teams
- New York Black Yankees (1946-1950)

William Julius Bowers (February 27, 1926 – February 28, 1977) was an American professional baseball catcher in the Negro leagues and Minor League Baseball. He played with the New York Black Yankees from 1946 to 1950 as a reserve catcher. He then played for several clubs in the Eastern League, Northern League, Big State League and Evangeline League from 1951 to 1955.

Bowers has been inducted into the Staten Island Sports Hall of Fame. He attended Tottenville High School.
