= Nakye Sanders =

American basketball player

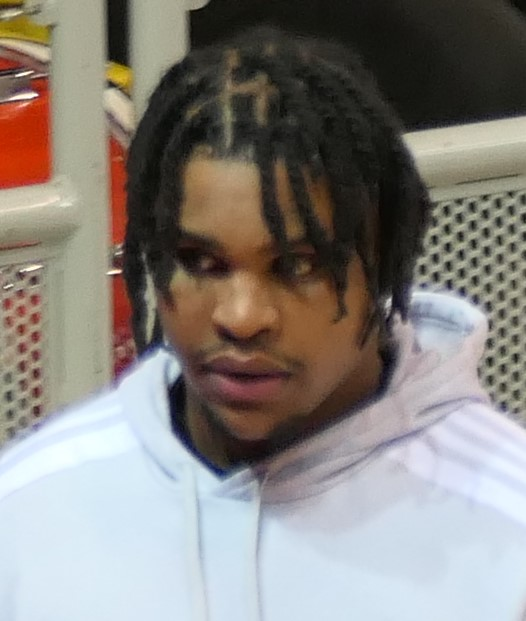
- Sanders in 2023

No. 1 – Basketball Nymburk
- Position: Forward
- League: Pro A Champions League

Personal information
- Born: November 1, 1997 (age 29) Staten Island, New York, U.S.
- Listed height: 6 ft 8 in (2.03 m)
- Listed weight: 240 lb (109 kg)

Career information
- High school: Tottenville (Staten Island, New York)
- College: Duquesne (2015–2017); Towson (2017–2020)
- NBA draft: 2020: undrafted
- Playing career: 2021–present

Career history
- 2021–2022: CD Povoa
- 2023: Balıkesir BB
- 2023–present: SIG Strasbourg

Nakye Sanders (born July 6, 1998) is an American professional basketball player SIG Strasbourg of the French LNB Pro A. He played college basketball for the Duquesne Dukes and Towson Tigers.

== High school career ==
Sanders attended Tottenville High School on Staten Island. He played four years of varsity basketball and led the team in scoring all four years. During his junior year, he caught the eyes of several NCAA Division I programs, getting offers from schools including Manhattan, Rhode Island and Drexel. Sanders also played AAU basketball for New Heights, with the likes of Ty Jerome. In 2014, Sanders made his commitment to Duquesne University in Pittsburgh, Pennsylvania.

== College career ==
Sanders played two years at Duquesne University, where he came off the bench during his freshman season, then averaged 5.06 points per game in 21 starts during his sophomore year.

Sanders transferred to Towson University in 2017 and had to sit out one year due to NCAA transfer eligibility rules. At Towson, Sanders started 50 of 62 games over two seasons.

== Professional career ==
=== CD Povoa (2021–2022) ===
Sanders signed his first professional contract with CD Povoa of Liga Portuguesa de Basquetebol in September 2021. He averaged 15.5 points per game and 8.8 rebounds per game in his first professional season. He did not resign with CD Povoa for the following season.

=== Balıkesir BB (2023) ===
On March 13, 2023, he signed with Balıkesir BB of the Türkiye Basketbol Ligi.

=== SIG Strasbourg (2023–present) ===
On August 11, 2023, he signed with SIG Strasbourg of the French LNB Pro A.

== Personal life ==
Sanders was born in Staten Island, New York to Corey Sanders and Maureen Lundy. On June 8, 2015, Sanders' father, Corey, was killed in a motorcycle accident. He cites his favorite athlete as Kobe Bryant.
