= Bill Barrett (artist) =

American sculptor and painter (born 1934)

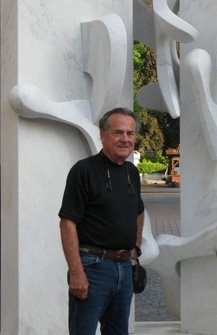
- Bill Barrett with his marble sculpture, "Lexeme VIII," in Zell, Germany.
- Born: December 21, 1934 (age 91); Los Angeles, California
- Education: University of Michigan: B.S. in Design (1958), M.S. in Design (1959), MFA (1960)
- Known for: Sculptor, Painter

Bill Barrett (born December 21, 1934) is an American sculptor, painter and jeweller. He is considered a central figure in the second generation of American metal sculptors and is internationally known for his abstract sculptures in steel, aluminum and bronze.

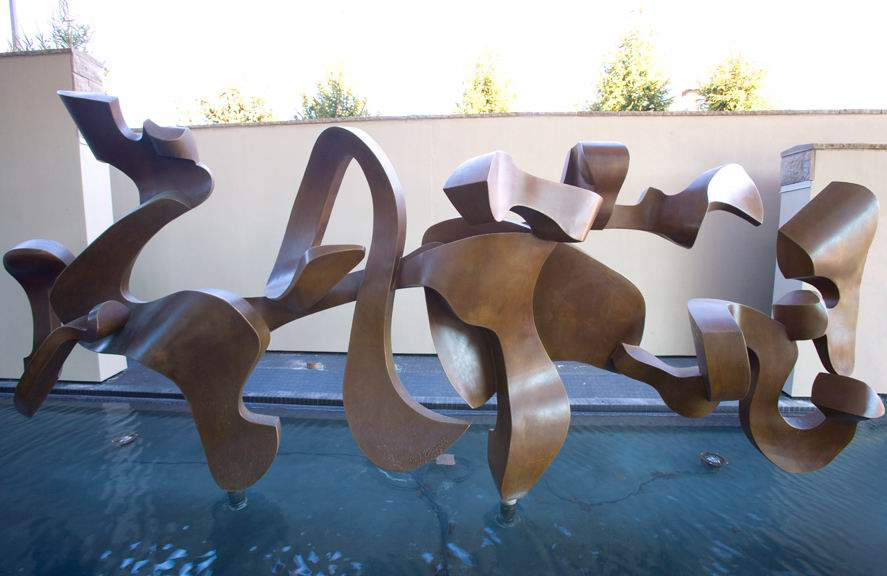
Bill Barrett, Martha Graham Ensemble, 2007–2008, Fabricated Bronze, 12' x 18' x 8'

== Steel ==
Barrett began welding while a student at the University of Michigan. His early works consisted of steel rods, joined to create open, three-dimensional drawings. For subsequent sculptures, he filled in the negative space between the rods with molten metal and steel plates. From here, Barrett developed a technique of cutting steel sheets into rectangular shapes and forming the shapes into three-dimensional blocks or cylindrical forms. He also explored the surface of steel, grinding or brushing the surface to give his finished work texture. Barrett later painted his steel sculptures to prevent the final pieces from rusting.

== Aluminum ==
Barrett's work with aluminum began in 1960s. These sculptures were composed of flat, horizontal shapes; their surfaces were bright and clean. They suggested Minimalist sculpture and the work of Tony Smith. In 1982, Barrett was commissioned for the City of New York through Percent for Art to create his largest sculpture to date, "Hari IV" (28' x 32' x 16'), for New Dorp High School on Staten Island. Keeping contemporary culture in mind, Barrett's title for this work comes from a graffiti "tag" that was appearing on New York City Subway cars at the time. The work was well received by the students, earning the nickname "the elephant". It became the high school's symbol, being used on the yearbook cover and adorning the football team's helmets. The New York Times critic Michael Brenson called this sculpture " one of the most successful public sculptures in the city." In 1986, Barrett was commissioned for the state of Connecticut for the Criminal Courts Building in Hartford, CT to create "Guardian", a fabricated aluminum sculpture that stands 15 feet tall.

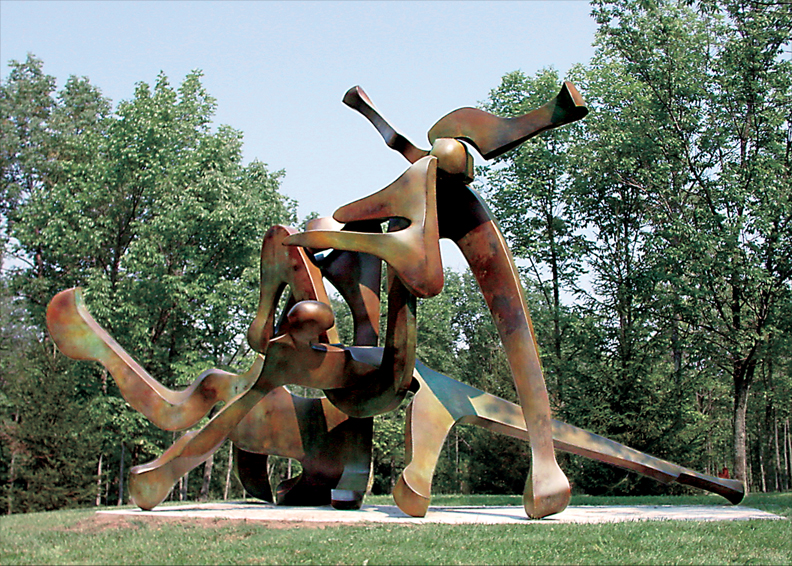
Bill Barrett, Melinda at the Beach, 2002, Fabricated Bronze, 15' x 25' x 12'

== Bronze ==
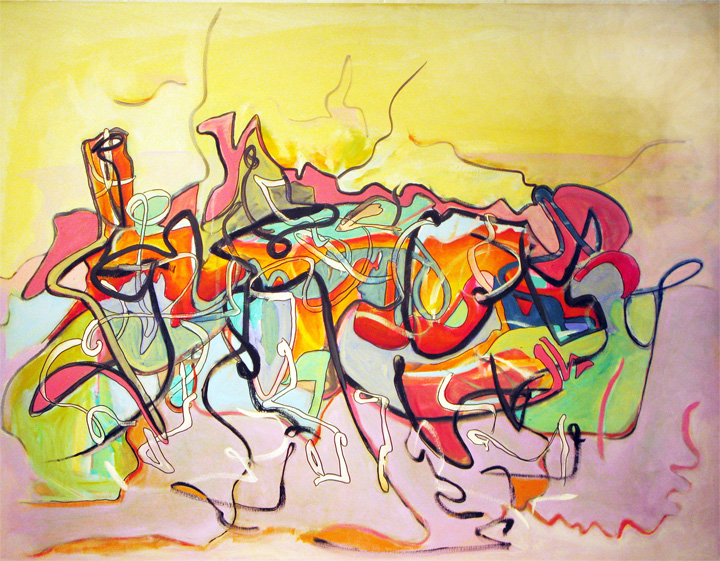
Bill Barrett, Santa Fe Suite, 2010, Oil on Canvas, 60" x 48"

Barrett started working with bronze as a way to explore increasingly fluid and gestural forms. As his interest in expressive forms grew, Barrett found that wax gave him the creative freedom to model shapes. He created a technique of pouring wax into a baking tin, drawing the shapes in the wax, and then combining the shapes to create a model, twisting and carving away at each shape by hand. The most successful models were cast into bronze and the bronze maquettes were then fabricated into larger bronze sculptures. From the '90s on, Barrett's bronze works took on a free-flowing quality that suggested calligraphy, movement, dance and music. Several sculptures from this decade refer directly to dance. In May 2011, Barrett installed a bronze sculpture in New York City's Tribeca neighborhood, for temporary display, as a memorial to September 11, 2001. In addition, the artist's small sculpture "Lexeme VII" is part of the 911 Memorial and Museum's permanent collection in New York City.

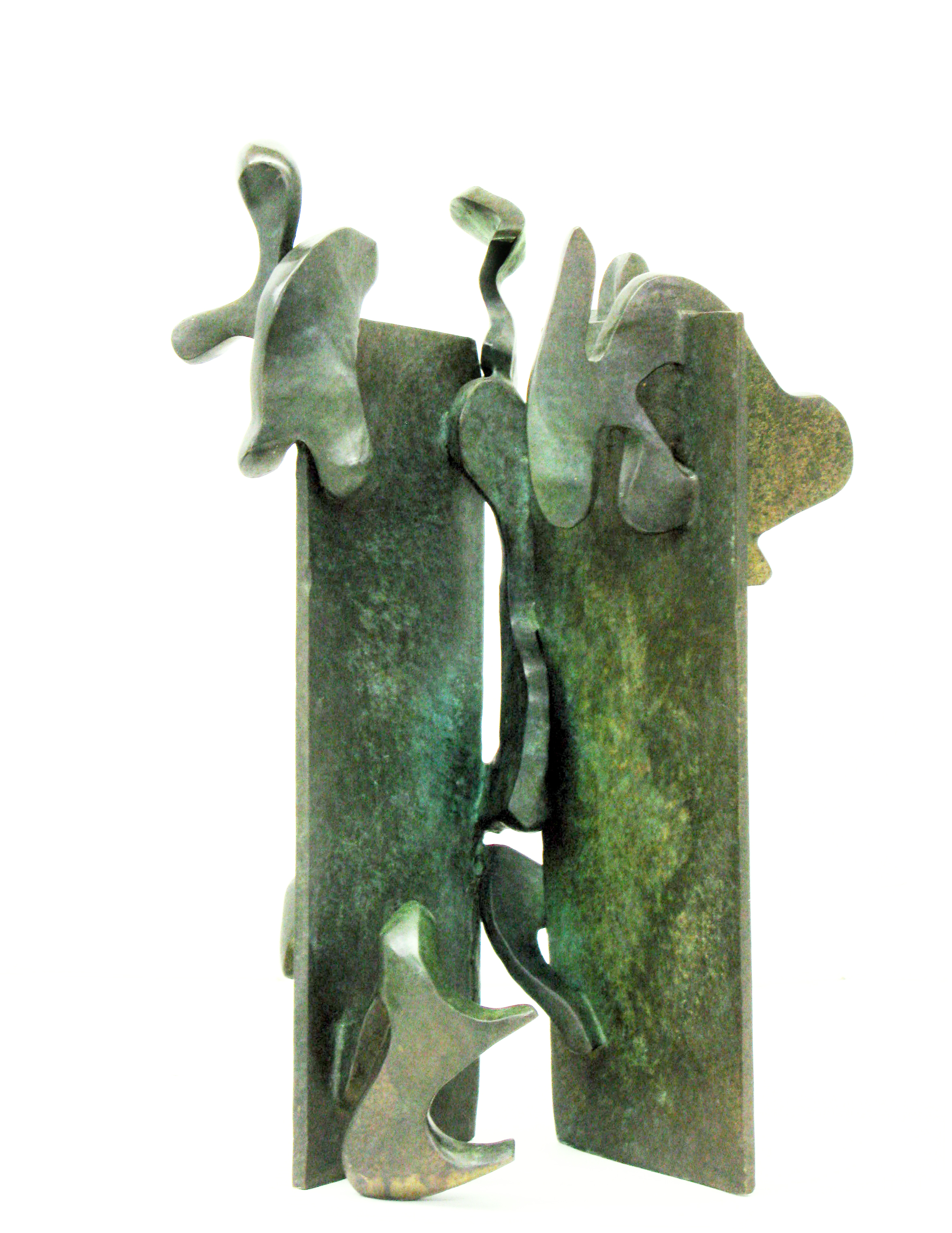
Bill Barrett, Lexeme VII Model, 2011, 21" x 15" x 10.5"

== Painting ==
Inspired by the light and colors of New Mexico, and by Arshile Gorky, Fernand Léger, and Jean Arp, Barrett began painting in 1992. His vibrant paintings quickly became an important part of his entire creative process—they complemented and influenced the free-flowing feel of his sculptures. Drawing—rhythmic contours and marks—maintained a central role in the creation of his paintings and sculptures. Since 1992, Barrett has had a number of solo exhibitions, featuring both painting and sculpture. In 2010 Barrett exhibited paintings and sculptures in two separate shows: Polyphonic Abstractions: Painting and Maquettes by Bill Barrett at the Christian Petersen Art Museum at Iowa State University, and Synchronicity at Kouros Gallery in New York City.

== Bibliography ==
- Philip F. Palmedo; Bill Barrett (2003). Bill Barrett: Evolution of a Sculptor. Hudson Hills.
