= Pam Sherman =

American attorney, actress, and writer

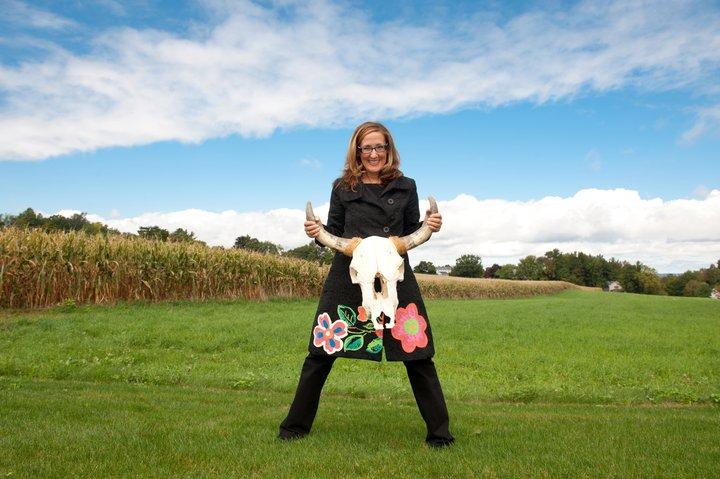
- Pam Sherman as the Suburban Outlaw
- Born: Pamela L. Sherman; June 21, 1962 (age 64); Staten Island, New York, U.S.
- Education: American University, Cardozo School of Law
- Occupations: Syndicated columnist, author, lawyer, actress
- Spouse: Neal Sherman

Pamela L. Sherman (born June 21, 1962) is an American attorney, actress, and writer based in Pittsford, New York. In 1998, her story was featured in People Magazine after quitting her job as a lawyer to pursue a career in acting She has performed in theater, film, and television, including, NBC's Homicide: Life on the Streets, Unsolved Mysteries, and the long-running play, Shear Madness at the Kennedy Center. Sherman published The Suburban Outlaw: Tales from the EDGE in 2009 which was recognized as a Best Seller in the Amazon's Woman & Business category.

== Early life and education ==
Sherman was born on Staten Island, New York in 1962. Her father was a practicing Obstetrician and Gynecologist and her mother a Freudian Psychoanalyst. In 1980, she graduated from Tottenville High School on Staten Island, New York. Sherman studied at the American University in Washington, D.C., attaining degrees in International Relations and Theater in 1984 and a J.D. degree from Yeshiva University Benjamin N. Cardozo School of Law in 1987. Upon leaving the law to become an actress, she attended the British American Drama Academy at Balliol College at Oxford University in 1992, and the Neighborhood Playhouse School of the Theatre in New York City.

== Career ==
=== Lawyer ===
After graduating law school, Sherman began the practice of law in Washington, D.C., with the firm of Dechert, Price & Rhoads (now Dechert LLP). Her focus was in securities matters, employment litigation and entertainment law. She then moved to the firm Melrod Redman & Gartlan also based in Washington, D.C.

=== Professor ===
Sherman was an adjunct professor at American University where she created an award-winning curriculum in Arts Law in the Arts Management Program. She has guest-lectured at Northwestern's Kellogg School of Management, the Rochester Institute of Technology and the Education Doctoral Program at St. John Fisher College. Among other seminars she has organized, is Acting for Lawyers at the Department of Justice in Washington, D.C.

=== Actress ===
After her law firm went out of business, Sherman returned to stage acting including shows at a number of Washington, D.C., area theaters. She had an extended run playing Mrs. Schubert in Shear Madness at the John F. Kennedy Center for the Performing Arts. She has also appeared in a number of television shows, commercials and plays. Sherman, along with the award-winning playwright Caleen Sinnette Jennings co-authored and performed the one-woman show, Pumping Josey: Life and Death in Suburbia. The show premiered at Horizon's Theatre, the oldest women's theater in America (now part of the Kennedy Center for Performing Arts). After a near-decade hiatus from the stage, in 2017 she appeared in Geva Theatre Center's run of Erma Bombeck: At Wit's End.

Sherman recently starred in Geva Theatre Center’s production of the one-woman show Erma Bombeck: At Wit's End and broke box office records for productions in the Fielding Stage. The run was extended twice due to popular demand with most performances selling out well before the production had even begun.

Geva Theatre Center’s production of Erma Bombeck: At Wit's End, starring Pam Sherman, was picked up by the Denver Center for the 2019-2020 Broadway Season.

A review of the production states that "Pam Sherman does a masterful job playing Bombeck, one zinger after another, and making her relevant to a 21st Century audience."

Following a sold-out run in Denver, Shea's Performing Arts Center in Buffalo, New York, announced that Shea's 710 Theater will present Erma Bombeck: At Wit's End, starring Pam Sherman, starting November 5, 2019.

"We are very excited to partner with Rochester's Geva Theatre to bring their blockbuster hit to Buffalo audiences" states President of Shea's Performing Arts Center, Michael G. Murphy.

In addition to theatre, Sherman has also acted in minor roles in the NBC series Unsolved Mysteries and Homicide: Life on the Streets. She also appeared in the movie The Alphabet Killer in 2008.

=== The Suburban Outlaw ===
In 2001, Sherman was asked to write a column for Rochester Magazine, owned by Gannett. The Suburban Outlaw Column in Rochester Magazine expanded to a weekly column in the Rochester, New York Newspaper the Democrat and Chronicle. Gannett then syndicated the Suburban Outlaw column among their newspapers nationally and digitally among their television stations. Her TEDx talk, "An Outlaw's Journey through the Arab Spring" focuses on her international travels.

=== Leadership Consultant ===
She is a keynote speaker and provides group and individual training programs to explore the EDGE for organizations as diverse as law firms, advertising agencies and Fortune 500 companies. Sherman provides training and development programs for business leaders all over the world on a variation of topics. Sherman is actively involved in the international organization, Young Presidents' Organization, Chairing the first-ever Spouse Experience for the 2009 Global Leadership Conference and serving on the International Youth & Family Task Force

== Personal life ==
Sherman lives with her husband, Neal Sherman and two children in Pittsford, New York (a suburb of Rochester, New York).
