= Battery Park Hotel =

Historic hotel in North Carolina, US

- U.S. National Register of Historic Places
- U.S. Historic district – Contributing property
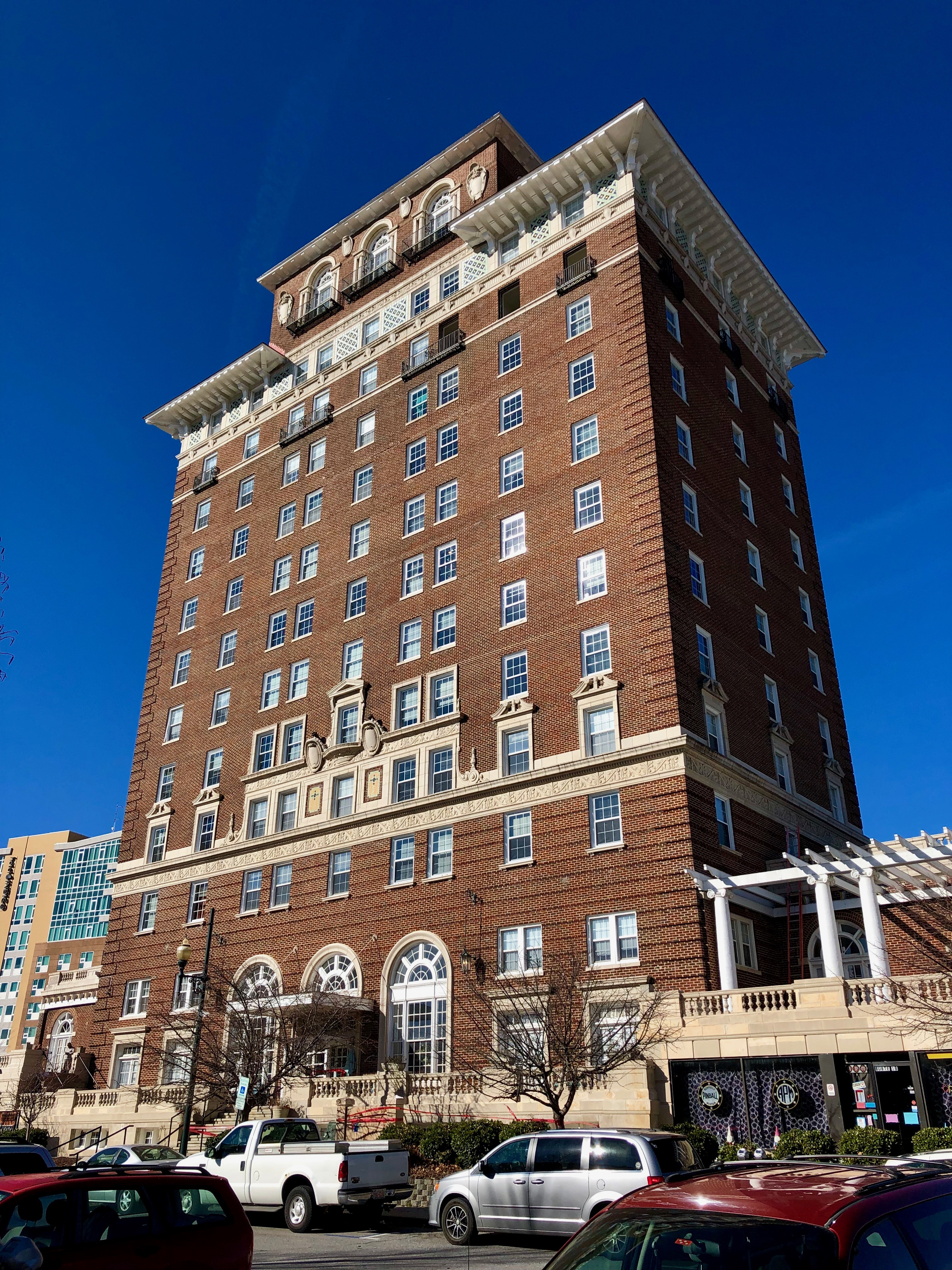
- The Second Battery Park Hotel (1924)

- Location within North Carolina Location within the United States
- Location: 1 Battle Sq., Asheville, North Carolina
- Coordinates: 35°35′49″N 82°32′19″W
- Built: 1924
- Architect: Stoddart, W.L.
- Architectural style: Classical Revival
- NRHP reference No.: 77000990
- Added to NRHP: July 14, 1977

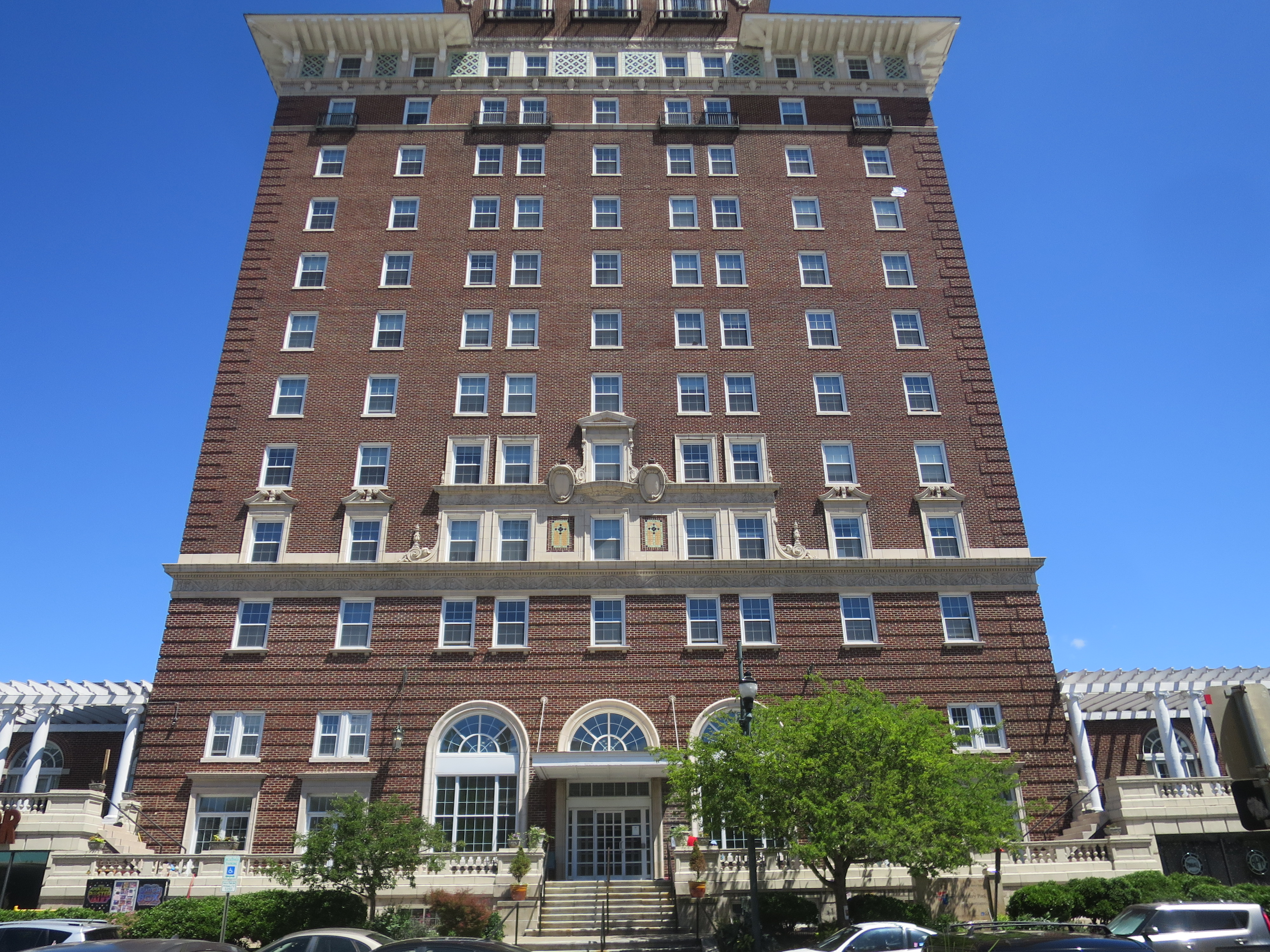
Battery Park Hotel front view.

The Battery Park Hotel is the name given to two hotels in Asheville, North Carolina. The one standing today is 14 stories tall and was built in 1924 by Edwin W. Grove, during a time of increased tourism in the North Carolina mountains. It replaced a Queen Anne style hotel which stood 125 feet tall. The name came from the fact that Confederate forces used the site for batteries of artillery.

== History ==
The original Battery Park Hotel was built in 1886 by Colonel Frank Coxe. It was designed by Philadelphia architect Edward Hazlehurst (1853-1915) in "spectacular" Queen Anne style. It was the first hotel in the South with an electric elevator, and one of the first with electric lighting.

Once the railroad reached Asheville in 1880, the mountain town attracted twenty passenger trains a day from the nation's largest cities, and people found out what a wonderful place the community was to visit. One reason for visiting Asheville was the clean mountain air, which was thought to treat tuberculosis. Five hotels were built, including Coxe's Battery Park Hotel on Asheville's tallest hill.

The Rockefeller and Lorillard families were among those who stayed in the Battery Park. Another notable guest was George Vanderbilt, who from his window could see the land that would one day become Biltmore Estate.

By 1920, the Asheville Citizen reported the Battery Park had changed management three times. Edwin Wiley Grove bought the Battery Park in 1921. In 1922 he announced that it would remain a resort hotel for winter and summer, while he would add a second year-round hotel nearby. Plans changed later, however. People hated to see the old Battery Park Hotel torn down, but Grove, known also for the Grove Park Inn, built a fine hotel in the same location. Despite its architectural value, which Grove acknowledged, the old building was "rapidly outgrowing its period of usefulness". Some sources say it was damaged by a fire before being torn down, but newspapers do not appear to support this. The new hotel would be first-class, for industry, and not a resort.

Architect William Lee Stoddart of New York City designed the 220-room Battery Park Hotel that stands today. The modern building was built of reinforced concrete with brick, limestone, and terra cotta, with a Mission Revival roof that offered a dining area. The architectural style was a mix of Neoclassical and "Spanish romanticism".

Helen Clevenger, a 19-year-old college student, was found dead in Room 224 on July 17, 1936, having died the night before. She had been shot in the chest, and slashed in the face with a sharp instrument. A hall boy at the hotel, 22-year-old Martin Moore, confessed to the murder (although he later recanted), and was executed on December 11 of the same year.

On September 4, 1943, a U.S. Government Official, Clifton Alheit, jumped to his death off the roof of the Battery Park Hotel in an apparent suicide.

The hotel closed October 30, 1972 and Billy Shadrick of Housing Projects, Inc. took it over in 1979, keeping the historic exterior with the help of preservation tax credits, and converting the building into apartments for senior citizens. Today it is owned by National Church Residences, and businesses operate on the first floor. It is located in the Downtown Asheville Historic District.
