= Mickey Burns =

American television host

Mickey Burns is an American television host, writer and producer. He hosts profiles. A native of Staten Island, New York, he serves as President of Quest Media Entertainment, Inc., a television production company that specializes in producing television programs, television commercials and media marketing, infomercials, corporate promotional videos and event filming.

== Early career ==
Burns's television roots can be traced back to New York City's WNYW-TV News, where he helped produce the 10 O'Clock News, The McCreary Report, and Sports Extra. In 1987–88, Burns was a member of two Emmy Award winning specials, "Pro Live v. Pro Choice" and "Domestic Violence", which he helped produce while at Fox. In the 1990s, he hosted, anchored and starred in numerous television programs such as "Special Edition," "Island View," and "Staten Island Live," for Time Warner Cable Inc. He was an election night reporter for Time Warner Cable Inc., for several years. In 1996, he became one of the founding members of Quest Media Entertainment, Inc., where he is responsible for writing, producing, hosting, and overseeing the daily operations of the company.

== Creation of Profiles ==
In 1998, Mickey created Quest Media's most popular and successful show, Profiles, a 30-minute celebrity interview show, providing an overview, or `profile' of that person's career. In 2003 "Profiles" was acquired by New York City's official television network, now called NYC Media. He has hosted and produced 300 episodes of `Profiles' with guests that have included: Mayim Bialik, Smokey Robinson, Joe Montana, Dr. Maya Angelou, Joan Rivers, Danny Glover, Isaac Hayes, Joan Collins, Mario Lopez, George Foreman, Mary Wilson, Neil Sedaka, Dick Cavett, Ben Vereen, and Tony Orlando.

== Education ==
Burns was a three-sport star (Baseball, Basketball, Football) at New Dorp High School on Staten Island, where he played a starring role in the football team’s undefeated run to the 1964 New York City championship.

Burns attended Missouri Valley College in Marshall, Missouri, where he majored in Education, on a football and baseball scholarship, followed by earning a master's degree at Central Missouri State University in Education and Communications.

In May 2012, Burns served as the commencement speaker at Missouri Valley College graduation ceremony and he was conferred as Honorary Doctorate in Humanities at the graduation.

== Awards ==
- Outstanding Alumni Award, Missouri Valley College 2010.
- Telly Award recipient in 2009, 2010, 2011, 2012, 2013.
- Inducted into the Staten Island Sports Hall of Fame in 2022.
