= Gemini 8 =

Spaceflight in NASA's Gemini program

Gemini VIII
- Gemini VIII rendezvous with its Agena Target Vehicle in a station-keeping exercise
- Mission type: Space rendezvous; Spacecraft docking; Extravehicular activity (failed)
- Operator: NASA
- COSPAR ID: 1966-020A
- SATCAT no.: 2105
- Mission duration: 10 hours, 41 minutes, 26 seconds
- Distance travelled: 293,206 kilometers (158,319 nautical miles)
- Orbits completed: 6

Spacecraft properties
- Spacecraft: Gemini SC8
- Manufacturer: McDonnell
- Launch mass: 3,789 kilograms (8,353 lb)

Crew
- Crew size: 2
- Members: Neil A. Armstrong; David R. Scott

Start of mission
- Launch date: March 16, 1966, 16:41:02 UTC
- Rocket: Titan II GLV, s/n 62-12563
- Launch site: Cape Kennedy LC-19

End of mission
- Recovered by: USS Leonard F. Mason
- Landing date: March 17, 1966, 03:22:28 UTC
- Landing site: 25°14′N 136°0′E

Orbital parameters
- Reference system: Geocentric
- Regime: Low Earth orbit
- Perigee altitude: 261 kilometers (141 nmi)
- Apogee altitude: 270 kilometers (150 nmi)
- Inclination: 28.9 degrees
- Period: 89.81 minutes
- Epoch: March 16, 1966

Docking with GATV-5003
- Docking date: March 16, 1966, 23:14 UTC
- Undocking date: March 16, 1966, ~23:45 UTC
- Time docked: ~30 minutes
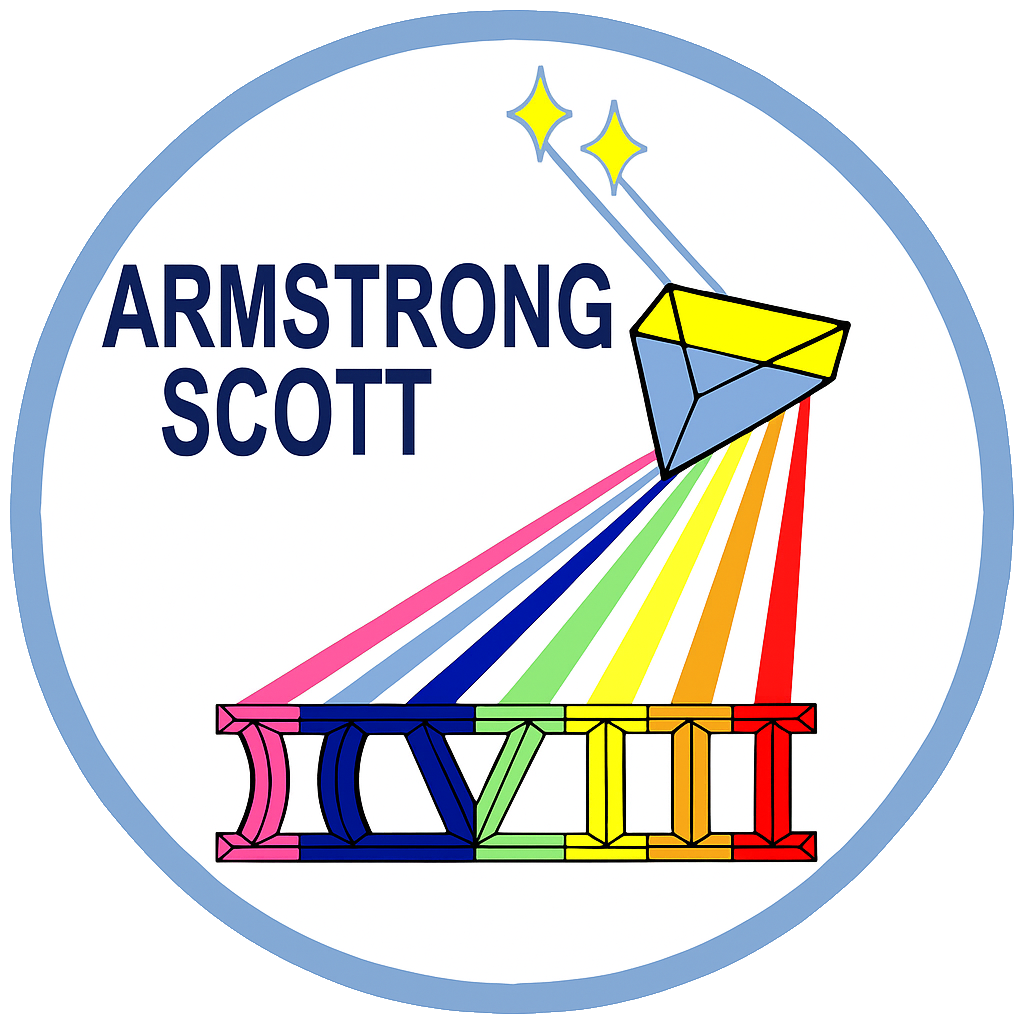
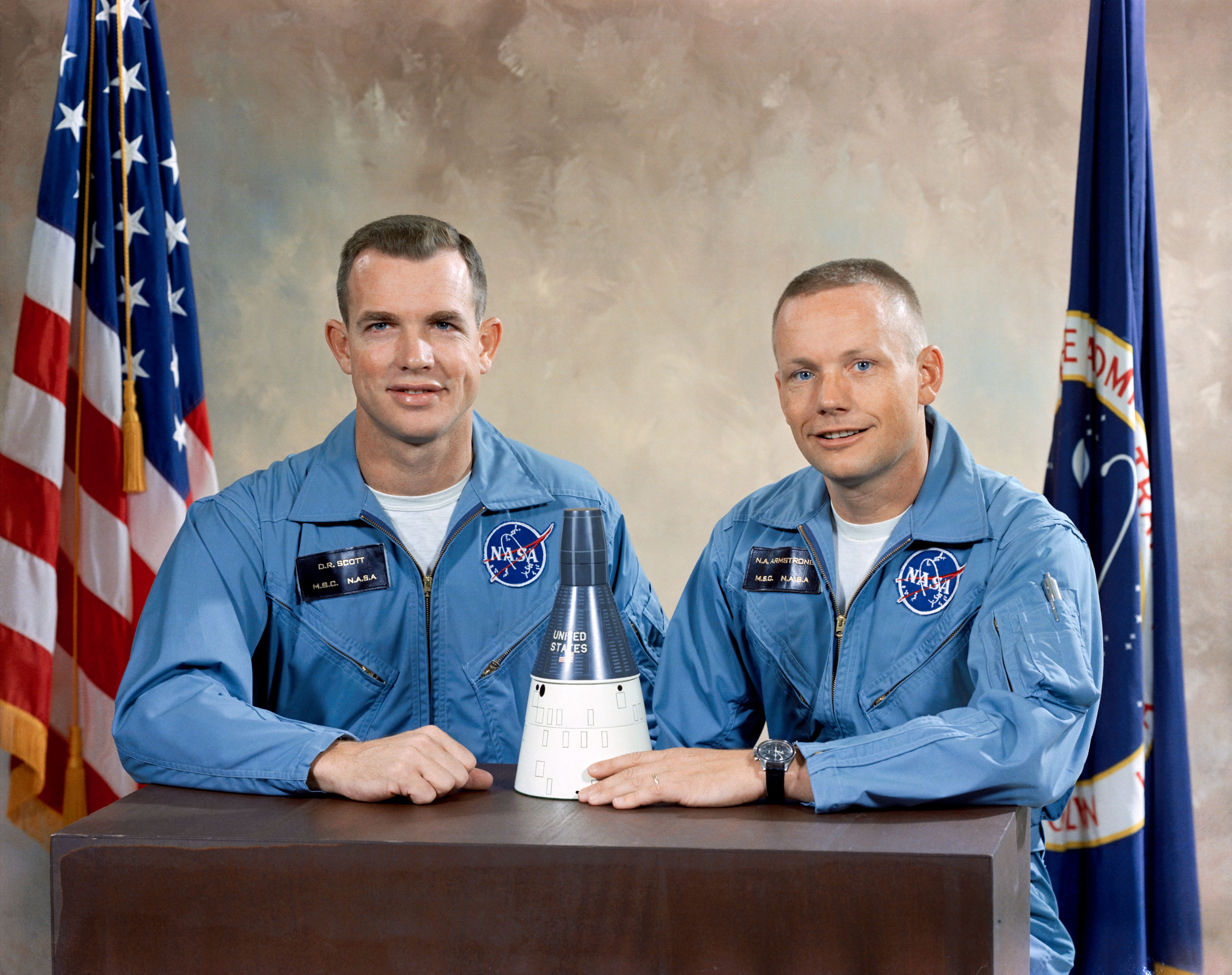
- (L-R) Scott, Armstrong Project Gemini

Gemini 8 (officially Gemini VIII) was the sixth crewed spaceflight in NASA's Gemini program. It was launched on March 16, 1966, and was the 14th crewed American flight and the 22nd crewed spaceflight overall. (Note: This count includes two X-15 flights higher than the Kármán Line at 100 kilometers (54 nautical miles; 62 miles; 328,084 feet).) The mission conducted the first U.S. docking of two spacecraft in orbit, but also suffered the first critical in-space system failure of a U.S. spacecraft. Astronauts Neil Armstrong and David Scott temporarily lost attitude control of their craft during the docking procedure, which threatened their lives and resulted in an immediate abort of the mission. The crew returned to Earth safely.

== Background ==
Command pilot Neil Armstrong resigned his commission in the U.S. Naval Reserve in 1960, and was selected as a crew member for Gemini 8 in September 1965. His flight marked the second time a U.S. civilian flew into space (after Joe Walker on X-15 Flight 90), (Note: The Soviet Union launched the first civilian, Valentina Tereshkova (also the first woman), into space aboard Vostok 6 on June 16, 1963.) and the first time a U.S. civilian flew into orbit.

== Crew ==
Position	Astronaut
Command Pilot	Neil A. Armstrong; First spaceflight
Pilot	David R. Scott; First spaceflight

=== Backup crew ===
Position	Astronaut
Command Pilot	Charles "Pete" Conrad Jr.
Pilot	Richard F. Gordon Jr.
This became the prime crew on Gemini 11.

=== Support crew ===
- Walter Cunningham (Cape CAPCOM)
- James A. Lovell (Houston CAPCOM)

== Mission parameters ==
- Mass: 3,789 kilograms (8,353 lb)
- Perigee (min): 159.8 kilometers (86.3 nautical miles)
- Apogee (max): 298.7 kilometers (161.3 nautical miles)
- Inclination: 28.91°
- Period: 88.83 min

=== Agena docking ===
March 16, 1966

- Docked: 23:14 UTC
- Undocked: ~23:45 UTC

== Objectives ==
Gemini VIII was planned to be a three-day mission. After being launched into an 87-by-146-nautical-mile (161 by 270 km) orbit, on the fourth revolution it was to rendezvous and dock with an Agena target vehicle, which had been earlier launched into a 161-nautical-mile (298 km) circular orbit. This was to be the first space docking in U.S. history. Four separate dockings were planned.

During the first docking, Pilot David Scott planned to perform an ambitious, two-hour-and-10-minute extra-vehicular activity (EVA), which would have been the first since Ed White's June 1965 spacewalk on Gemini IV. On a 25-foot (7.6 m) tether for one and a half revolutions around the Earth, Scott would have retrieved a nuclear emulsion radiation experiment from the front of the Gemini's spacecraft adapter, then activate a micrometeoroid experiment on the Agena. Then he was to move back to the Gemini and test a minimum-reaction power tool by loosening and tightening bolts on a work panel.

During the EVA, after Armstrong undocked from the Agena, Scott was to don and test an Extravehicular Support Pack (ESP) stored at the back of the spacecraft adapter. This was a backpack with a self-contained oxygen supply, extra Freon propellant for his Hand Held Maneuvering Unit, and a 75-foot (23 m) extension to his tether. He would practice several maneuvers in formation with the Gemini and Agena vehicles (separated at distances up to 60 feet (18 m), in concert with Armstrong in the Gemini.

The flight also carried an additional three scientific, four technological, and one medical experiment.

== Flight ==
=== Agena and Gemini launch ===
The Agena Target Vehicle is launched into space on an Atlas rocket in preparation for Gemini 8.

Five months earlier, NASA had launched an Agena Target Vehicle for Gemini 6, but the Atlas-Agena launch failed when the Agena's engine exploded during orbital injection and the mission had to be rescheduled. The next attempt succeeded. Everything worked perfectly; the Agena put itself into a 161-nautical-mile (298 km) circular orbit and oriented itself to the correct attitude for the docking.

A Gemini-Titan launch vehicle lifts Gemini 8 into orbit, March 16, 1966.

The Gemini spacecraft was launched into an 86-by-147-nautical-mile (159 by 272 km) orbit by a modified Titan II on March 16, 1966 (coincidentally the 40th anniversary of the launch of the world's first liquid-fueled rocket by Robert H. Goddard), at 10:41:02 a.m. EST. Gemini 8's launch was nominal and no significant anomalies occurred with either the Titan II or the spacecraft.

	Gemini 8 Agena info
Target vehicle	GATV-5003
NSSDC ID:	1966-019A
Mass	3,175 kilograms (7,000 lb)
Launch site	LC-14
Launch date	March 16, 1966
Launch time	15:00:03 UTC
1st perigee	299.1 kilometers (161.5 nmi)
1st apogee	299.7 kilometers (161.8 nmi)
Period	90.47 m
Inclination	28.86
Reentered	September 15, 1967

=== Rendezvous and docking ===
Gemini 8 docking with Agena vehicle

Their first course adjustment was made at one hour and 34 minutes into the mission, when the astronauts lowered their apogee slightly with a five-second Orbit Attitude and Maneuvering System (OAMS) thruster burn. The second adjustment was made near apogee of the second orbit, and raised both the apogee and perigee by adding 49 feet per second (15 m/s) to their speed. The third adjustment was made over the Pacific Ocean, a southward orbital plane change, made with a 59 feet per second (18 m/s) sideways thruster burn. When they were over Mexico, Jim Lovell, the Houston capsule communicator, told them they needed one last correction, a 2.6 feet per second (0.79 m/s) speed addition.

The rendezvous radar acquired the Agena Target Vehicle at a distance of 179 nautical miles (332 km). At 3 hours, 48 minutes and 10 seconds into the mission they performed another burn that put them in a circular orbit 15 nautical miles (28 km) below the Agena. They first sighted it when they were 76 nautical miles (141 km) away, and at 55 nautical miles (102 km) they gave the computer automatic control.

After several small burns they were 151 feet (46 m) away and with no relative velocity. After 30 minutes of visually inspecting the Agena to make sure that it had not been damaged by the launch, they were given the go for docking. Armstrong started to move towards the Agena at 3.15 inches (8 centimeters) per second. In a matter of minutes, the Agena's docking latches clicked and a green light indicated that the docking had been successfully completed. "Flight, we are docked! Yes, it's really a smoothie," Scott radioed to the ground.

=== Emergency ===
Gemini 8 spinning and undocking

There was some suspicion on the ground that the Agena's attitude control system was malfunctioning and might not have the correct program stored in it. This suspicion was found to be incorrect. Shortly before radio blackout, Mission Control cautioned the astronauts to immediately abort the docking if any abnormalities occurred with the Agena.

After the Agena began execution of its stored command program, which instructed the Agena to turn the combined spacecraft 90° to the right, Scott noticed that they were rolling. Armstrong used the Gemini's OAMS thrusters to stop the roll, but after it stopped, it immediately started again. Gemini 8 was out of range of ground communications at this time.

Armstrong reported that the OAMS fuel had dropped to 30%, indicating that the problem could be on their own spacecraft. With concern that the high rate of rotation might damage one or both spacecraft or even cause the propellant-heavy Agena to rupture or explode, the crew decided to undock from the Agena so they could analyze the situation. Scott switched the Agena control back to ground command, while Armstrong struggled to stabilize the combined vehicle enough to permit undocking. Scott then hit the undock button, and Armstrong fired a long burst of translation thrusters to back away from the Agena. Without the added mass of the Agena, Gemini started rotating more rapidly. The astronauts realized that the problem was on the Gemini. By now the tumble rate had reached 296 degrees per second and Armstrong decided to shut down the OAMS and use the Reentry Control System (RCS) thrusters, located on the Gemini's nose, to stop the tumble. From start to finish the incident lasted nearly 30 minutes.

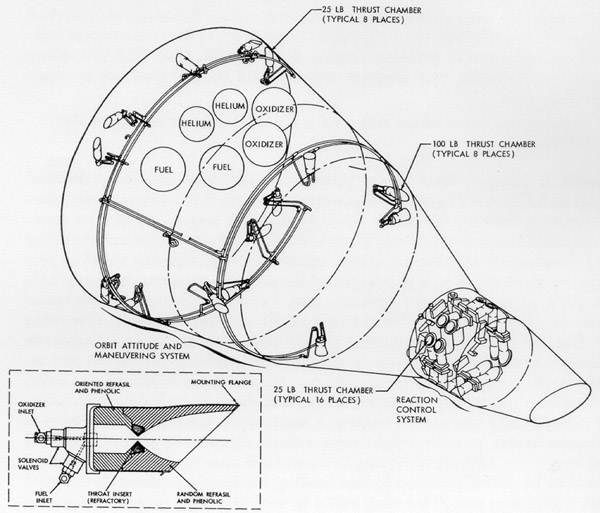
Location of Gemini OAMS and Reaction Control System thrusters

NASA turned off the squawk box at Armstrong's home, alarming his wife. Scott later praised Armstrong's actions as their spacecraft spun: "The guy was brilliant. He knew the system so well. He found the solution, he activated the solution, under extreme circumstances ... it was my lucky day to be flying with him." The spacecraft came in range of the ground communications ship USNS Coastal Sentry. After steadying the spacecraft, the crew tested each OAMS thruster in turn and found that Number 8 had stuck on. Almost 75% of the reentry maneuvering fuel had been used to stop the tumble, and mission rules dictated that the flight be aborted once the Reentry Control System was fired for any reason. Gemini 8 immediately prepared for an emergency landing.

=== Landing and recovery ===
It was decided to let the spacecraft reenter one orbit later so that it could land in a place that could be reached by secondary recovery forces. The original plan was for Gemini 8 to land in the Atlantic, but that was supposed to be three days later. USS Leonard F. Mason started to steam towards the new landing site 800 kilometers (430 nmi; 500 mi) east of Okinawa and 1,000 kilometers (540 nmi; 620 mi) south of Yokosuka, Japan.

Reentry took place over China, out of range of NASA tracking stations.

Planes were also dispatched, and U.S. Air Force pilot Les Schneider spotted the spacecraft as it descended precisely on time and on target. Three pararescuers jumped from their C-54 and attached a flotation collar to the capsule.

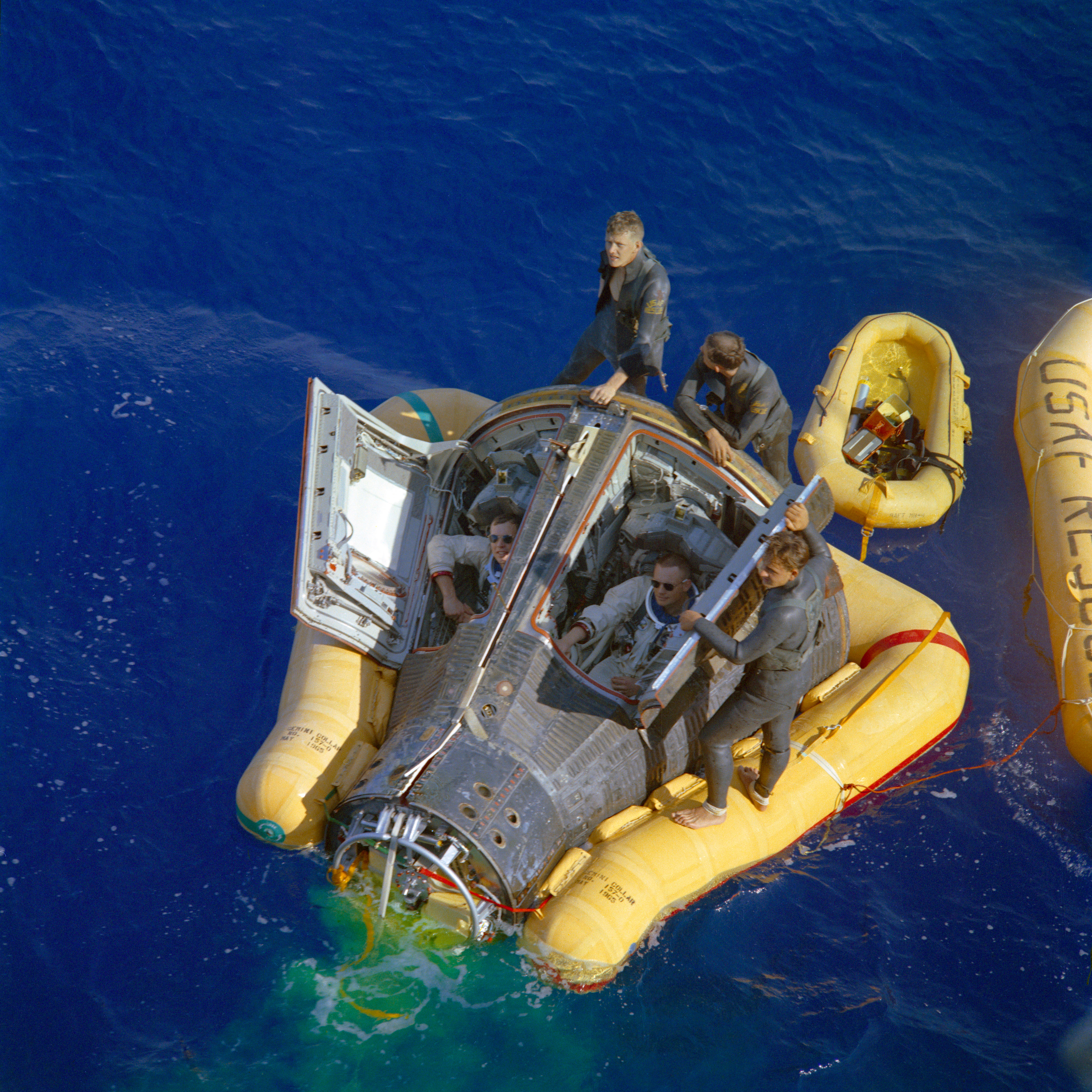
Scott (L) and Armstrong (R) await USS Leonard F. Mason

All of the pararescuers and astronauts suffered from seasickness. Three hours after splashdown, Leonard F. Mason had both men and the spacecraft on board. The astronauts were exhausted, but had otherwise come through the flight and their time on the water in good condition. They were briefly checked and slept for nine hours.

The next morning, the ship docked at the port of Naha. Fellow astronaut Walter Schirra and other NASA officials flew in to greet them before the astronauts were summoned back to the ship for medical tests and debriefing. After release, they were brought by limousine to waiting helicopters where they flew to Kadena Air Base and then on to Florida on a C-135.

Upon the return, the spacecraft was covered with a tarp. As part of the investigation into the mishap, ground controllers tested the Agena stage for the next several days by ordering it to perform various in-orbit maneuvers until exhausting its propellant and electrical power.

Four months later, the crew of Gemini 10 rendezvoused with the inert Agena and astronaut Michael Collins retrieved its micrometeorite collector.

== Thruster incident: cause and outcome ==
No conclusive reason for the thruster malfunction was found. The most probable cause was determined to be an electrical short, most likely due to a static electricity discharge. Power still flowed to the thruster, even when it was switched off. To prevent recurrence of this problem, spacecraft designs were changed so each thruster would have an isolated circuit.

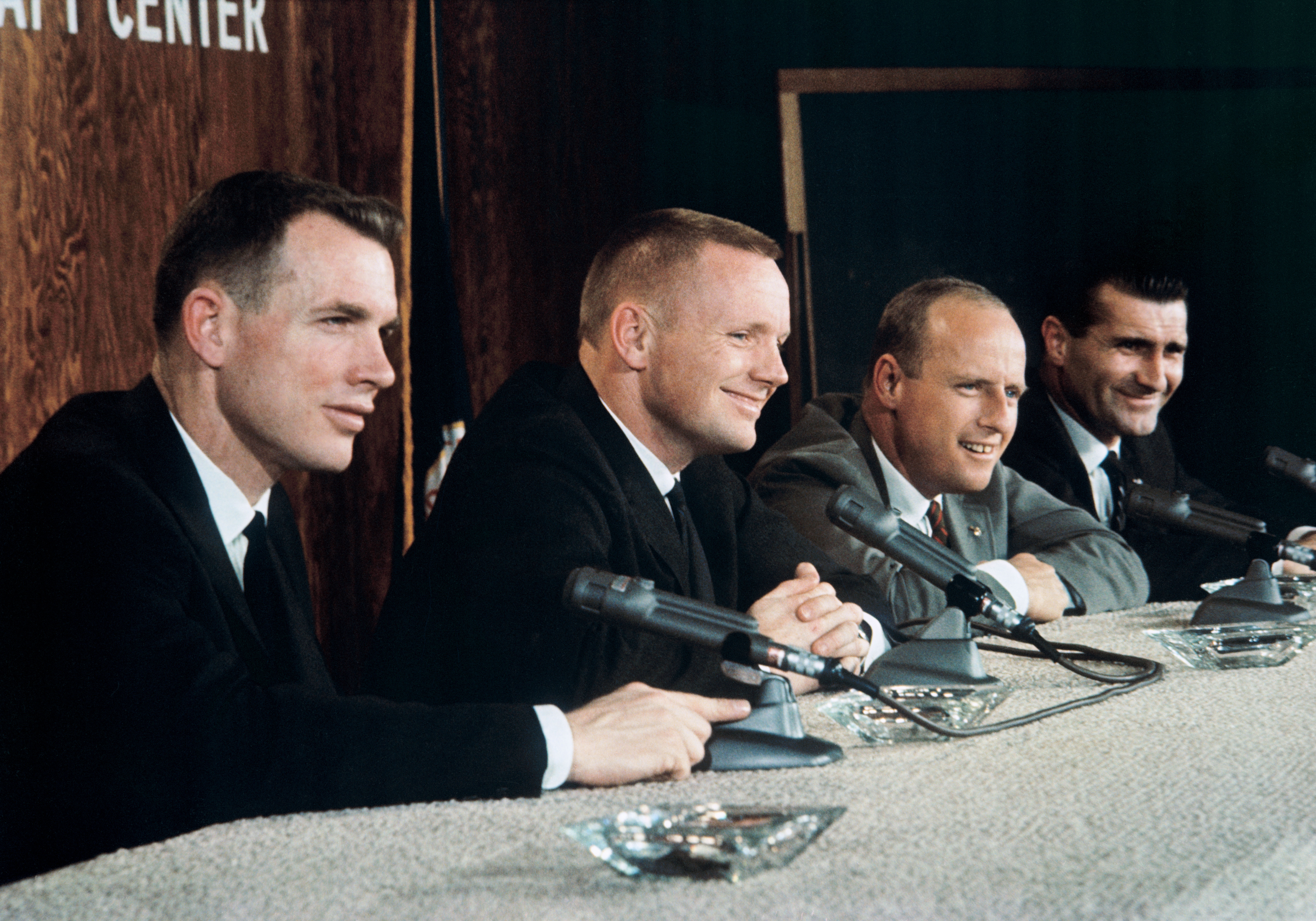
The Gemini 8 crews answer questions at an MSC press conference.

Quote from Flight: My Life in Mission Control by Chris Kraft, page 256:

Engineers tore into the OAMS system when the spacecraft got home and found a short circuit that made one thruster fire continuously. We learned an important lesson -never put electrical power to any system unless it’s supposed to be on. The OAMS was rewired so that a short circuit would always give us a dead thruster, not one that kept firing until a circuit breaker was opened by an astronaut.

The Deputy Administrator of NASA, Robert Seamans, was attending a celebratory dinner sponsored by the Goddard Space Flight Center, at which Vice President Hubert Humphrey was the guest speaker, when the problem arose. The incident inspired Seamans to review NASA's problem investigation procedures, modeled after military crash investigations, and on April 14, 1966, to formalize a new procedure in Management Instruction 8621.1, Mission Failure Investigation Policy And Procedures. This gave the Deputy Administrator the option of performing independent investigations of major failures, beyond those failure investigations for which the various Program Office officials were normally responsible. It declared: "It is NASA policy to investigate and document the causes of all major mission failures which occur in the conduct of its space and aeronautical activities and to take appropriate corrective actions as a result of the findings and recommendations." Seamans first invoked this new procedure immediately following the fatal Apollo 1 spacecraft fire on January 27, 1967. It was also invoked after the next critical in-flight failure, which occurred on the Apollo 13 lunar mission in April 1970.

McDonnell Aircraft Corporation, the Gemini spacecraft prime contractor, also changed its procedures. Prior to the accident, McDonnell's top engineers would be at Cape Kennedy Air Force Station for the launch, then fly to Mission Control in Houston, Texas for the rest of the mission. The problem occurred while they were en route, so it was decided to keep McDonnell engineers in Houston for the entire mission.

== Insignia ==
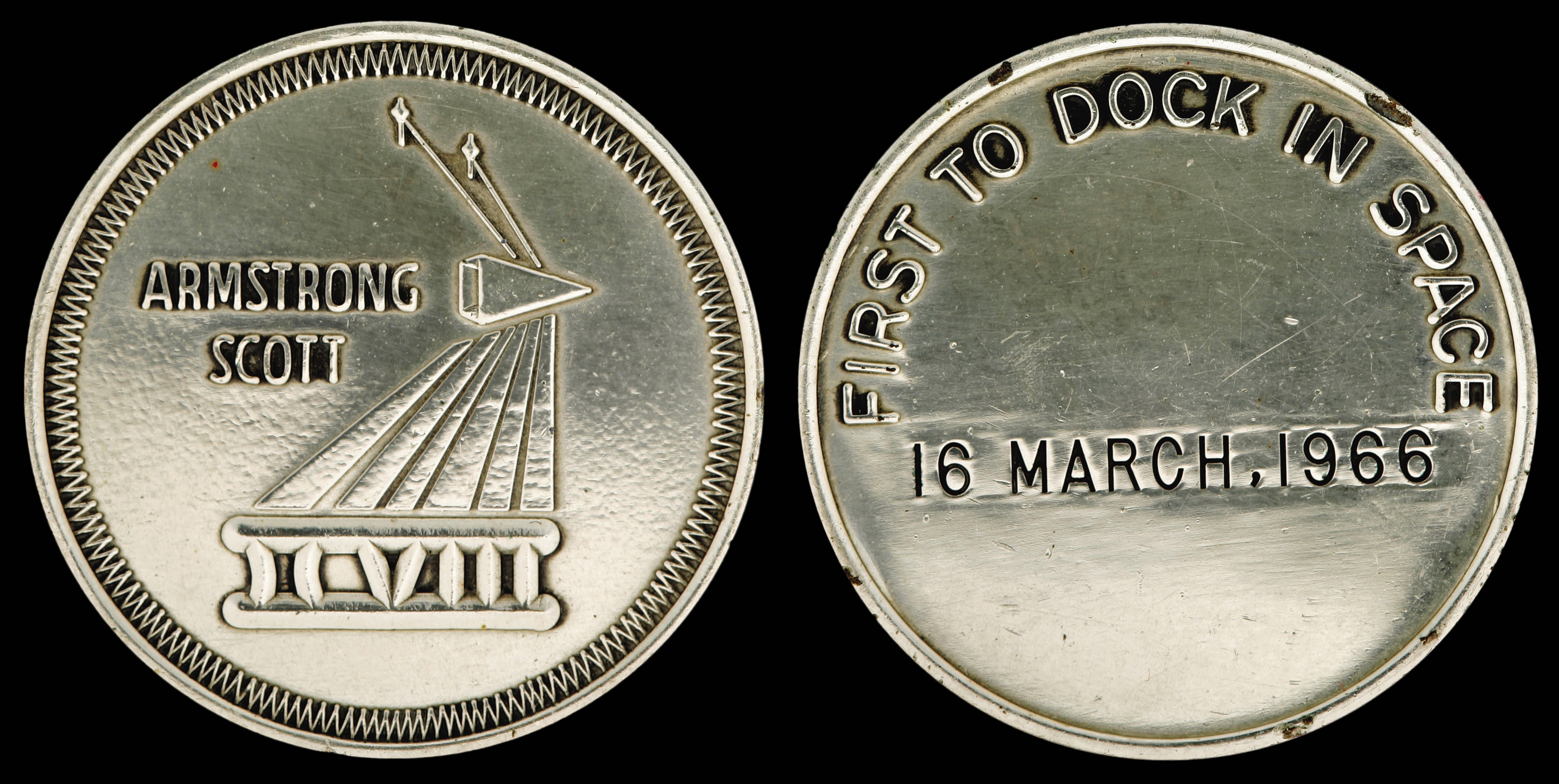
Gemini 8 space-flown Fliteline Medallion

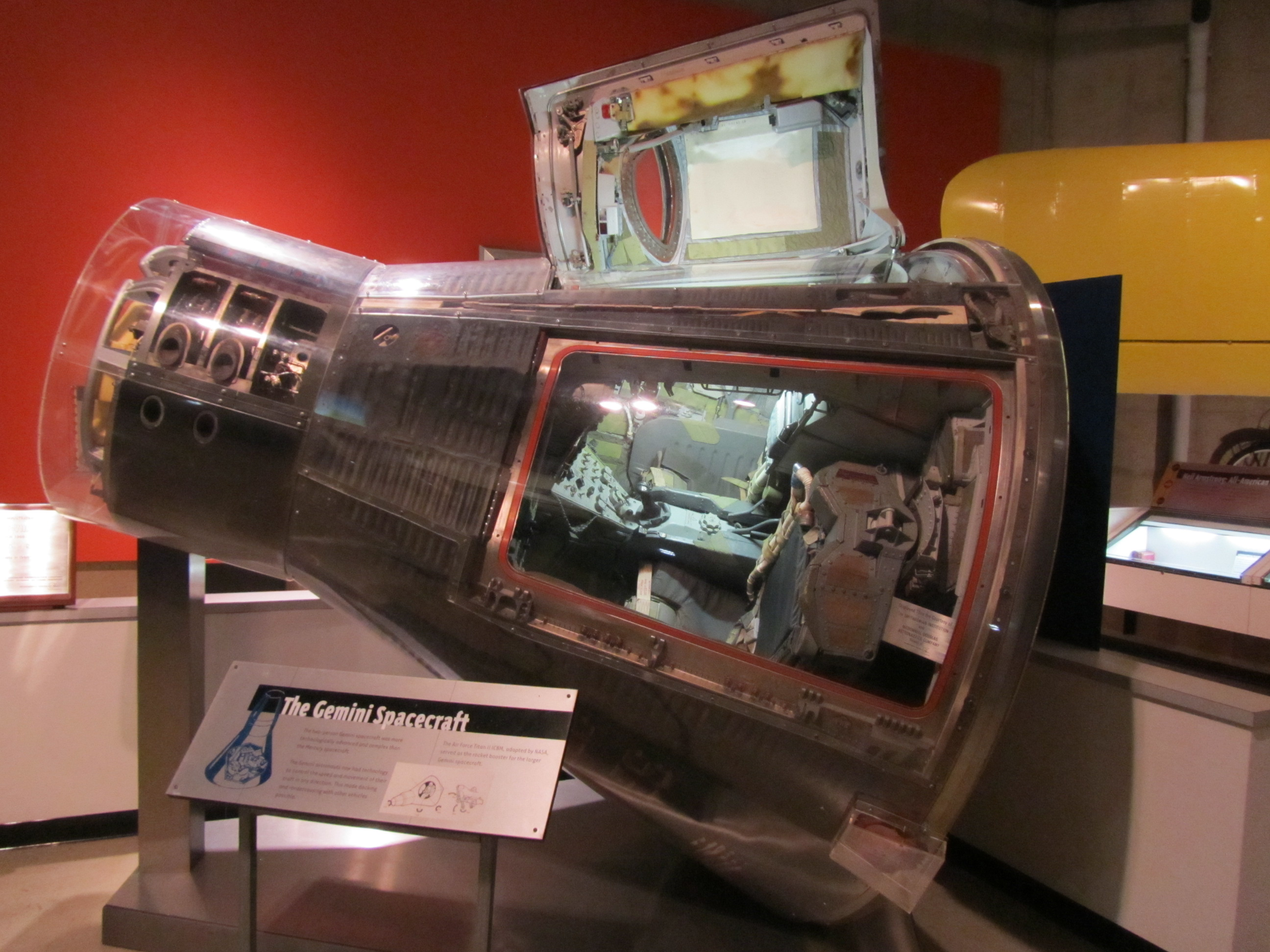
The Gemini 8 spacecraft is displayed at the Armstrong Air & Space Museum in Wapakoneta, Ohio.

The mission patch shows the whole spectrum of objectives that were hoped to have been accomplished on Gemini 8. The text at the bottom is composed of the zodiacal symbol for Gemini,, and the Roman numeral for eight, VIII. The two stars are Castor and Pollux, which are in the constellation of Gemini, and are refracted through a prism to provide the spectrum. Armstrong and Scott both designed the flight patch.

== Dramatizations ==
The Gemini 8 mission was dramatized in episode 1 "Can We Do This?", of the 1998 HBO miniseries From the Earth to the Moon, and in the 2018 Armstrong biopic, First Man. The story of the mission is told from the point of view of a fictional mission controller in the TV series For All Mankind (2021, Season 2, Episode 8).

== Gallery ==
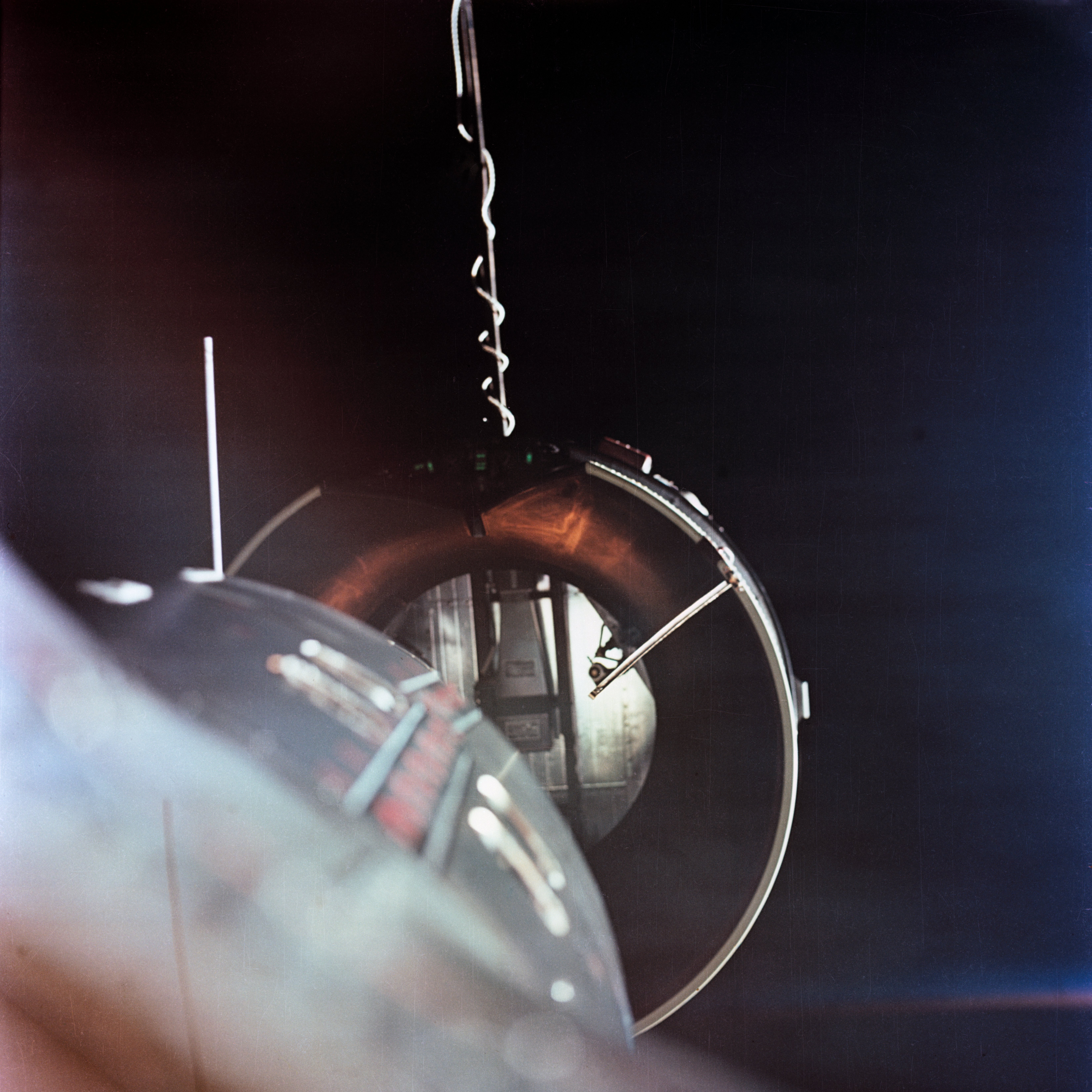

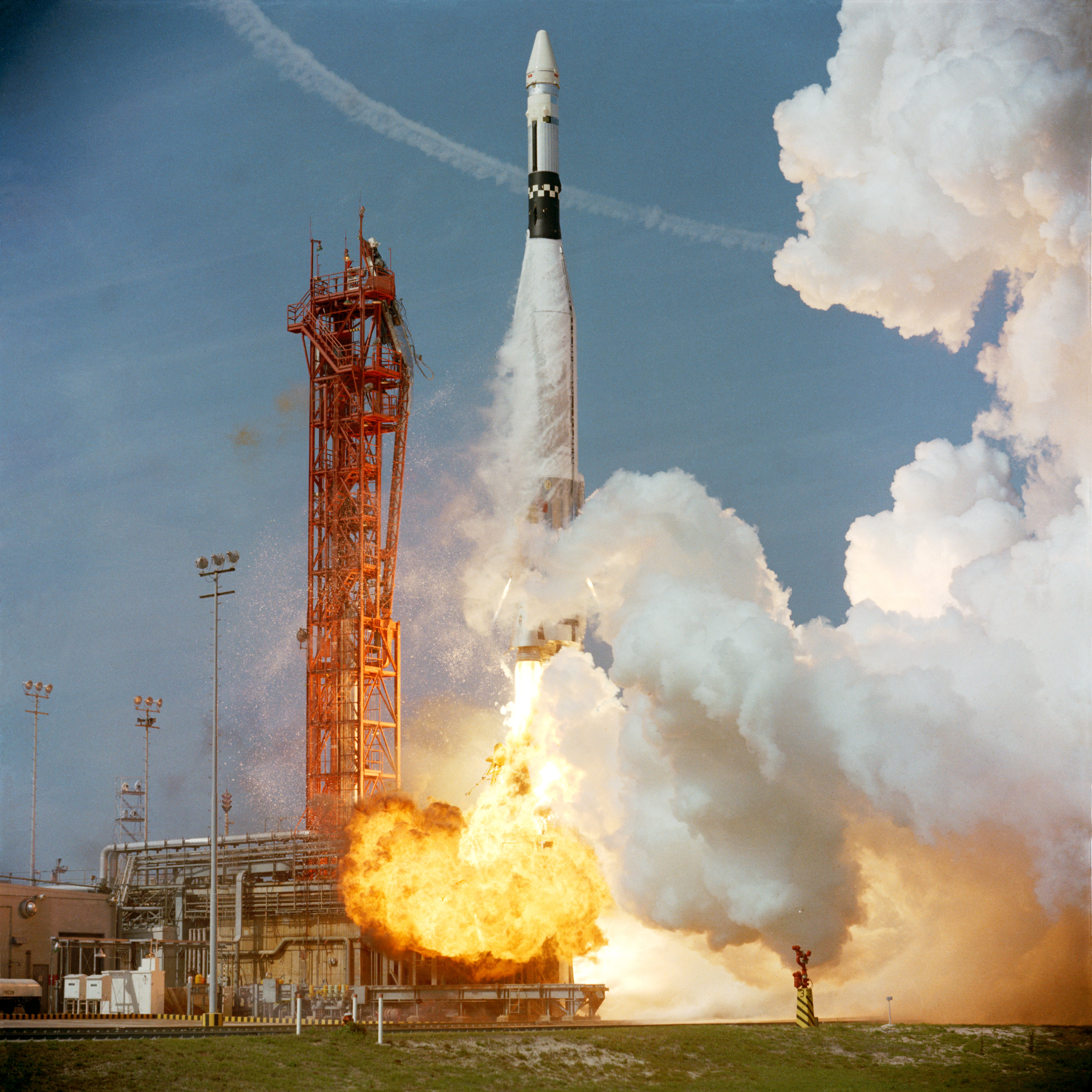

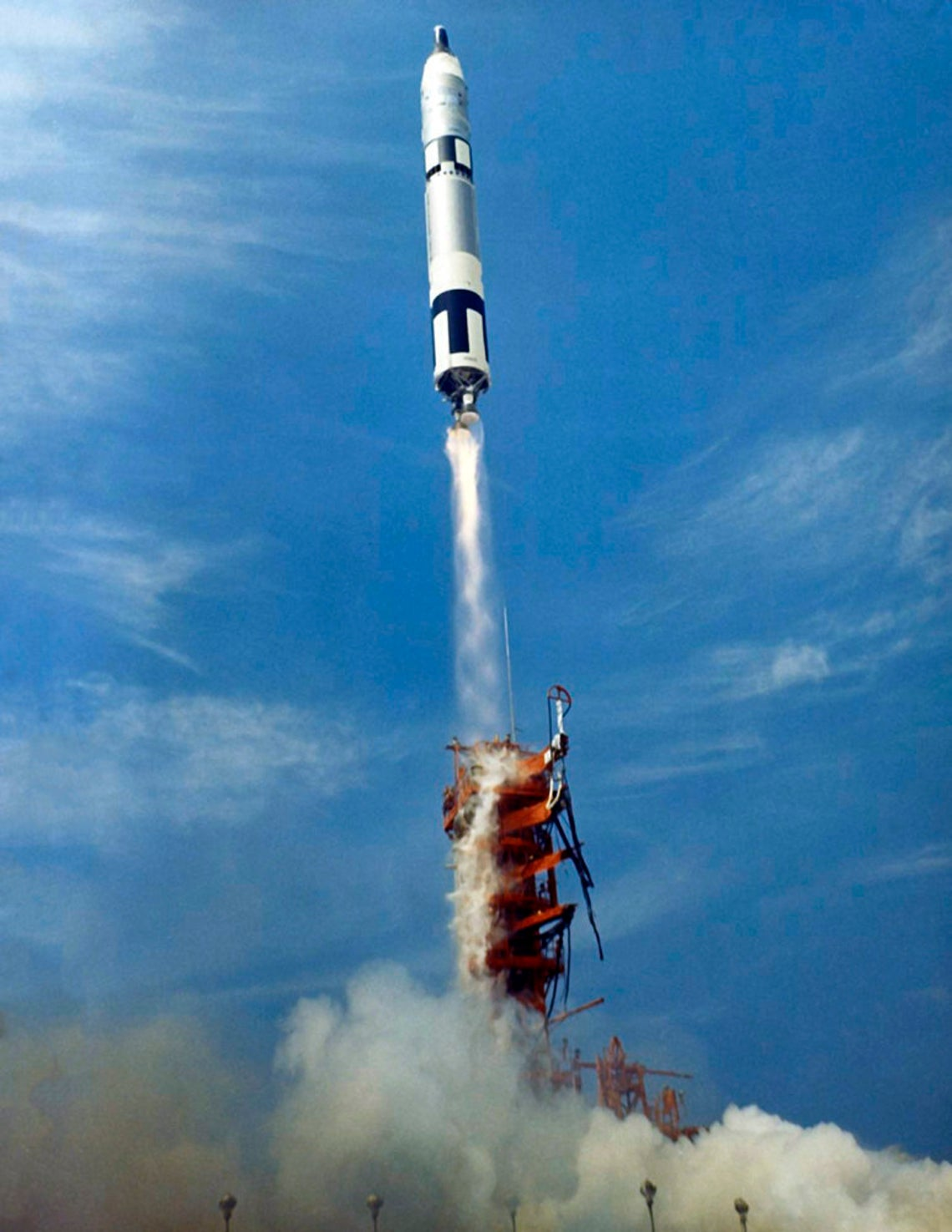

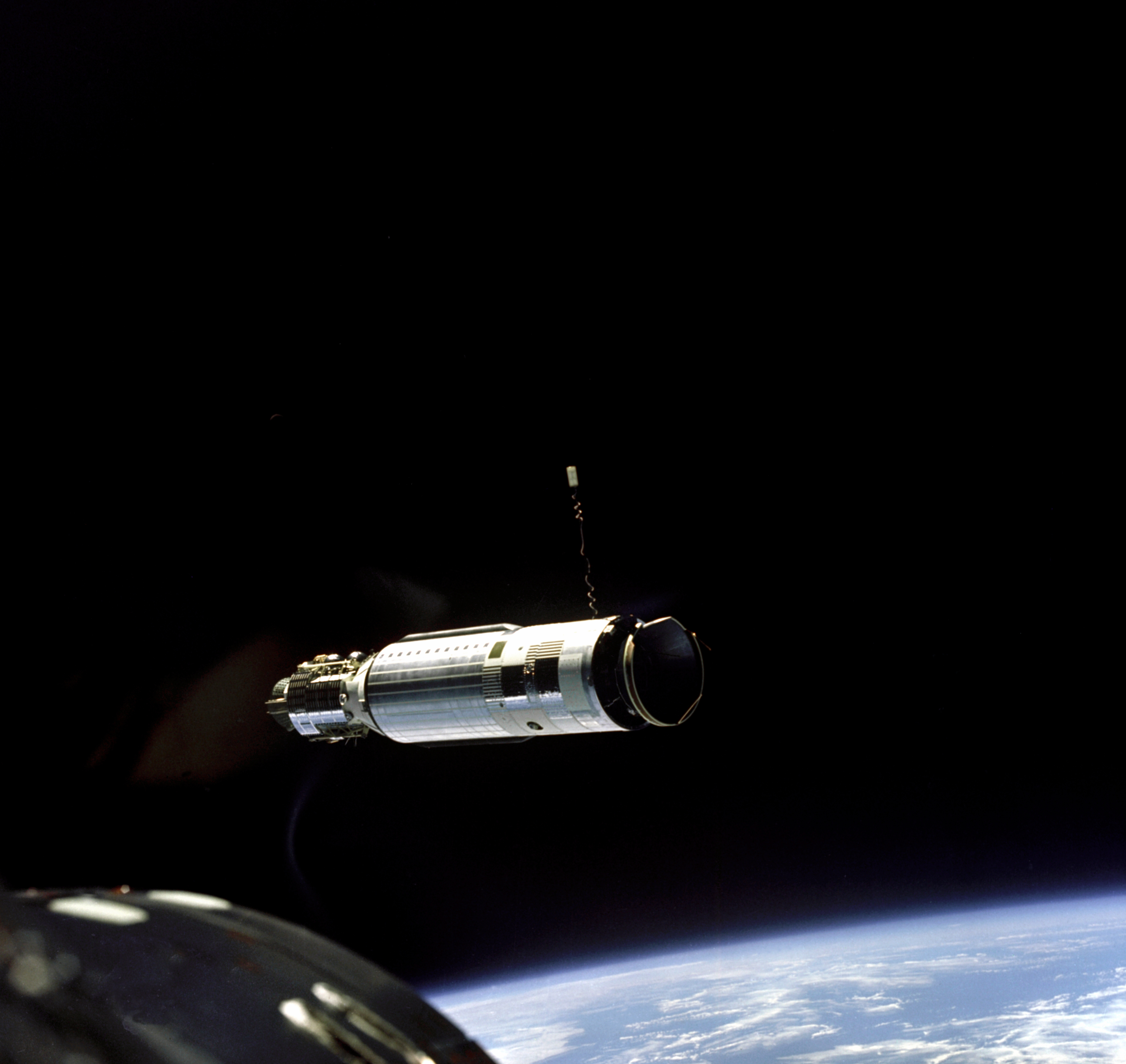
