= Ag Hill Complex =

Historic house in Pennsylvania, United States

- U.S. National Register of Historic Places
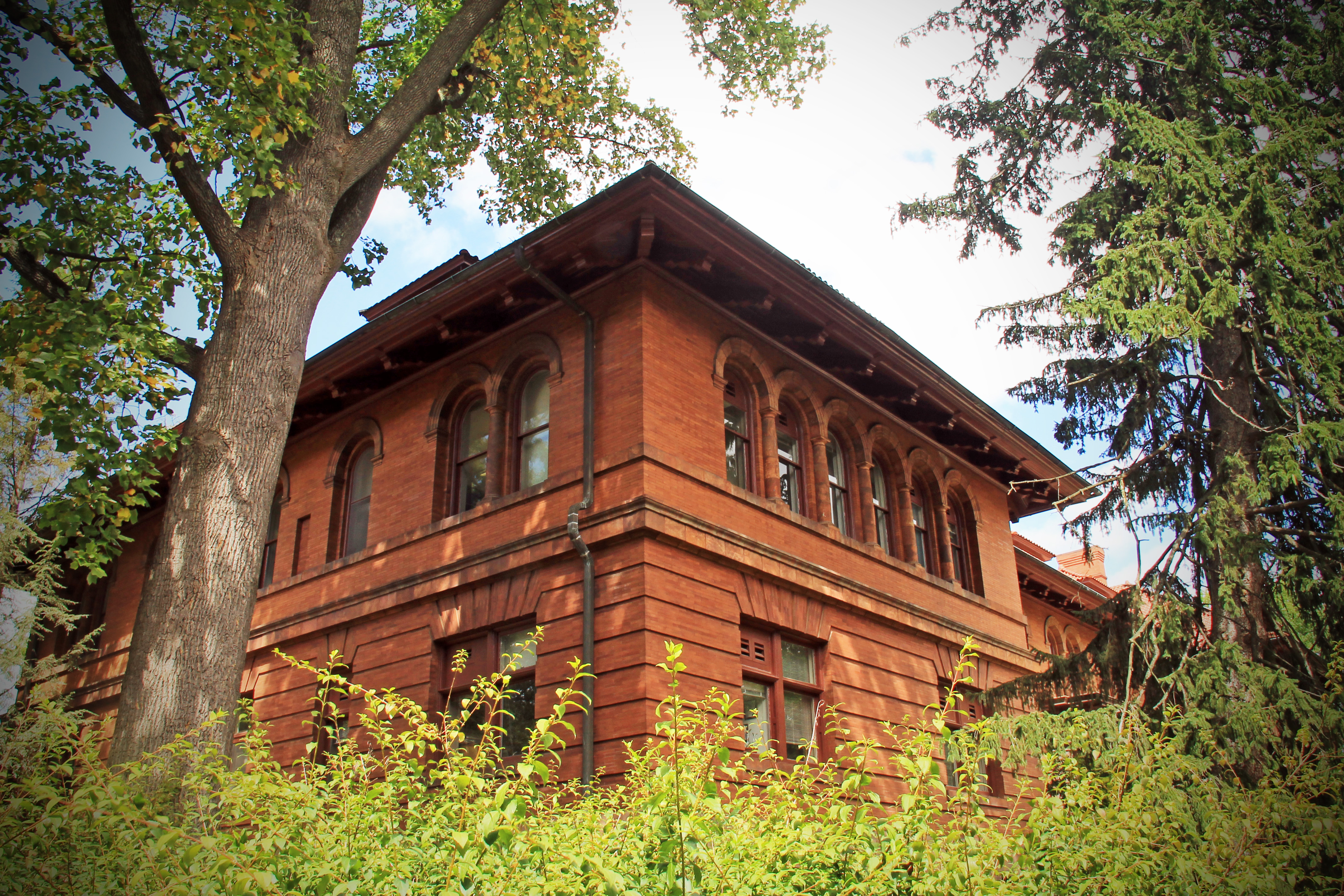
- Main Agriculture Building, now known as Armsby

- Location within Pennsylvania Location within the United States
- Location: University Park, State College
- Coordinates: 40°47′58.9″N 77°51′52.8″W
- Architect: Hazlehurst, Edward
- Architectural style: Queen Anne and Romanesque
- NRHP reference No.: 79002191
- Added to NRHP: January 22, 1979

The Ag Hill Complex or simply Ag Hill is a collection of some of Penn State's oldest buildings. The School of Agriculture was established on a plateau northeast of Old Main, which would come to be known as Ag Hill.

It was listed on the National Register of Historic Places in 1979.
