= Richmond Tunnel =

Water supply tunnel in New York City

Coordinates: 40°38′8″N 74°4′27″W

The Richmond Tunnel is a 5-mile-long (8.0 km) water supply tunnel that runs below Upper New York Bay between Red Hook, Brooklyn, and Tompkinsville, Staten Island. Completed in 1970, the tunnel is part of the New York City water supply system and provides Staten Island with water from upstate reservoirs via a connection to City Water Tunnel No. 2 in Brooklyn. The Richmond Tunnel was constructed in conjunction with water storage tanks located below Silver Lake Park on Staten Island and a supply line that connects a distribution chamber in Tompkinsville to the underground storage tanks.

The 10-foot-diameter (3.0 m) Richmond Tunnel, which is located approximately 900 feet (270 m) below sea level, was built to increase the supply of water to Staten Island and accommodate growth in the island's population following the opening of the Verrazzano–Narrows Bridge in 1964. Before the new tunnel was completed, Staten Island received its water from two siphons under the Narrows that connected to trunk water mains in Brooklyn. The Richmond Tunnel can carry 300 million US gallons (1,100,000 m^{3}) of water per day, which is ten times the amount that could be carried by the siphons. The two siphons, which were kept as a backup to the Richmond Tunnel after it opened, were abandoned in 2016 after they were replaced by a deeper siphon, which allowed the shipping channel to be dredged and accommodate larger vessels.

== History ==
=== Planning and design ===
In the 1950s, New York City's Board of Water Supply began making plans to increase the capacity of water supplied to Staten Island from its system of upstate reservoirs, aqueducts, tunnels and water mains. At the time, Staten Island was the only New York City borough without a direct tunnel in the water supply system and had to rely on two siphons under the harbor that connected to trunk water mains in Brooklyn. During times of peak water consumption in Brooklyn, the supply of water through the siphons was reduced or shut down and Staten Island had to rely on water stored in the Silver Lake Reservoir or obtained from artesian wells on the island's South Shore. The siphons across the Narrows terminated at the foot of Victory Boulevard in Tompkinsville and at the foot of Vanderbilt Avenue in Clifton. With diameters of 36 and 42 inches (910 and 1,070 mm), the pipes could supply up to 30 million US gallons (110,000 m^{3}) a day. The first siphon to Tompkinsville was completed in 1915 and the second siphon to Clifton was added in 1925.

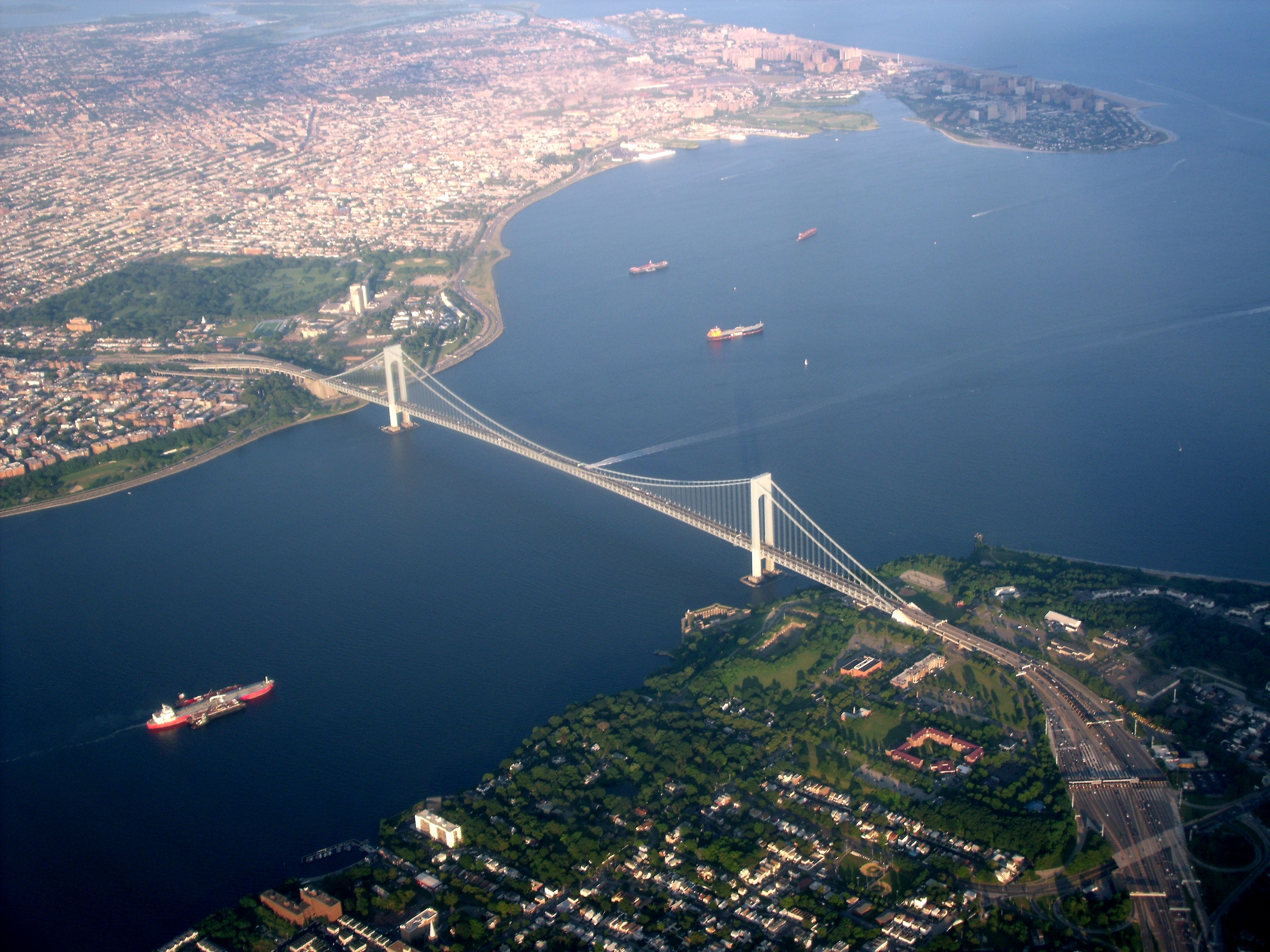
An aerial view of the Narrows and the Verrazzano–Narrows Bridge

In 1957, exploratory borings were made to obtain information on subsurface conditions for a new tunnel under the harbor providing a direct connection to the water supply system. The need for a new water tunnel serving Staten Island also considered the growth in the island's population that could occur as a result of the completion of the proposed Narrows Bridge. The construction of additional siphons across the Narrows had been explored by the Board of Water Supply, but their cost was found to be comparable to that of a tunnel, the latter of which would be better protected against disturbances since it would be located deep within rock. Damage from a ship's anchor had resulted in a one-month shutdown of the first siphon in 1922 and the second siphon once had to be shut down for several months to repair a corroded joint. Installation of feeder lines to carry water across the Narrows Bridge was also ruled out as being an impractical alternative.

Preliminary approval of $25 million for construction of a new tunnel under the bay designed to supply up 300 million US gallons (1,100,000 m^{3}) of water a day was given by the city in 1959. The proposed tunnel would provide a direct connection to City Water Tunnel No. 2 in Brooklyn. Additional probes of the rock along the proposed route of the tunnel were conducted in 1959 and 1960. In April 1960, the Board of Estimate approved $1.4 million in funds for the preparation of plans and surveys for the water tunnel.

On February 9, 1961, the Board of Estimate approved $21 million in funds for the first phase of the project, which involved sinking shafts in Tompkinsville on Staten Island and Red Hook in Brooklyn and constructing a tunnel between them. Subsequent phases of the project would involve the construction of a pipeline from the Tompkinsville shaft to Silver Lake Park and covered water storage tanks at the park, which would replace the Silver Lake Park Reservoir and turn it into a recreational facility managed by the Parks Department. The Board of Water Supply would later refer to the overall project as the "Richmond Project" and the tunnel was named the "Richmond Tunnel" by engineers. Later that year, a joint venture of Perini Corporation and Morrison–Knudsen submitted the lowest of five bids to construct the first phase of the project involving the tunnel below the harbor. The contract was awarded to the joint venture on December 5, 1961.

=== Construction ===
Construction of the tunnel's 950-foot-deep (290 m) shaft on Staten Island began in January 1962. The shaft was located near the waterfront in Tompkinsville on the south side of the Hannah Street bridge across the Staten Island Railway. A formal groundbreaking ceremony for the tunnel was held on February 20, 1962, at the shaft in Tompkinsville with Deputy Mayor Edward Francis Cavanagh Jr., Staten Island Borough President Albert V. Maniscalco, Board of Water Supply Chairman Arthur C. Ford, and other officials in attendance. Excavation of the shaft reached bedrock at a depth of 65 feet (20 m) in March 1962.

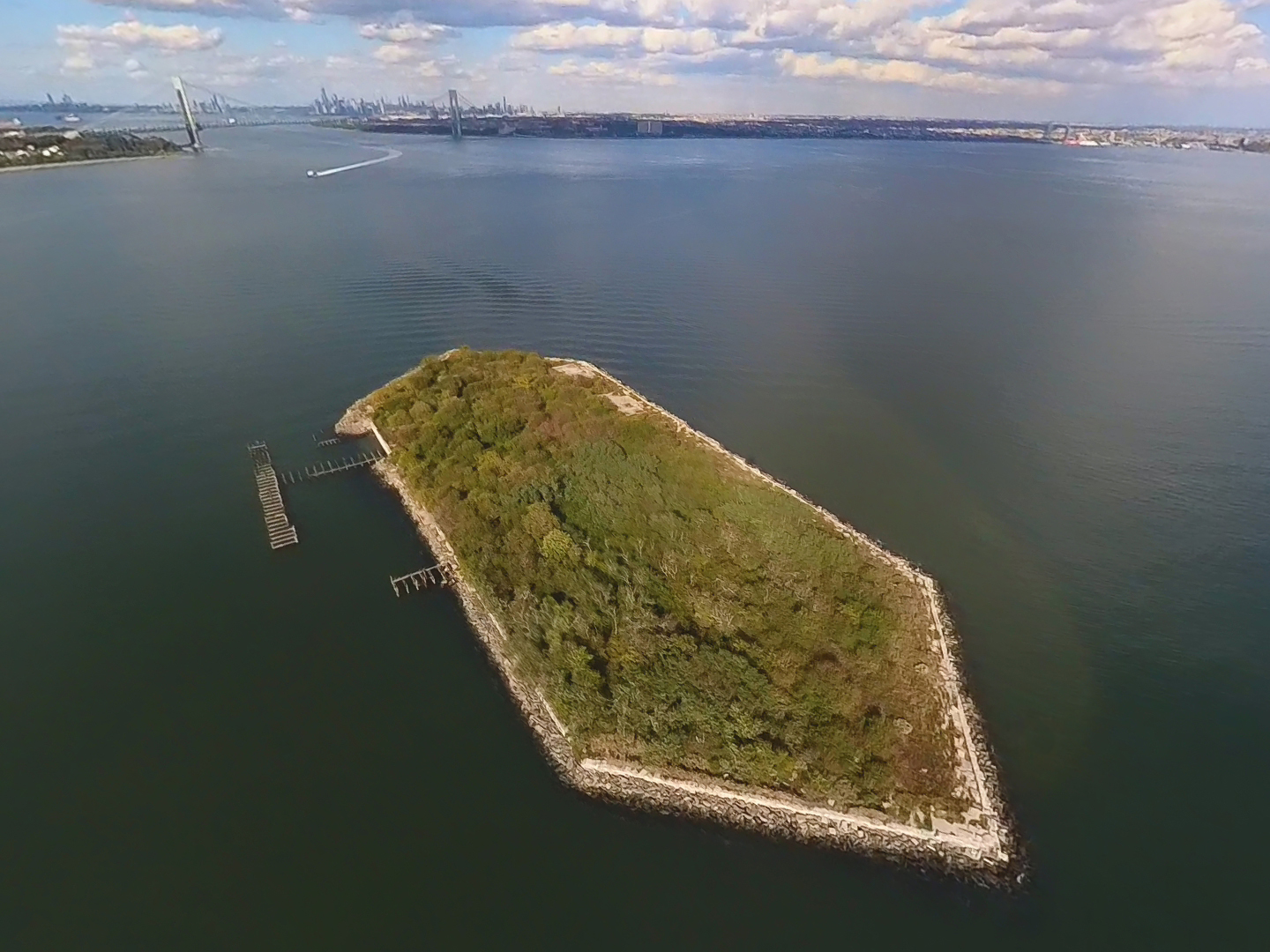
An aerial view of Hoffman Island, which was planned to be expanded with rock mined from the tunnel

There was a debate over the use of the rock excavated from the tunnel's construction. In April 1962, Councilman Edward V. Curry introduced a resolution in the City Council calling for the excavated materials to be used to repair unimproved roads on Staten Island. The following month, Councilmember Eric J. Treulich introduced another resolution in the City Council calling for the rock to be used in fortifying the sea wall at Manhattan Beach in Brooklyn. However, a clause in the tunnel's construction contract gave the city the option to use the rock as fill for a bulkhead to join Hoffman and Swinburne islands located off South Beach. Linking the two islands was an idea that had been previously proposed; the islands had been purchased from the federal government by Bernard Baruch and deeded to the Parks Department with the intention of creating a larger island for recreational purposes. The Board of Estimate approved the purchase of the excavated rock to join the two islands in May 1962. However, later tests showed the quality of the rock as being "poor" and it was instead dumped on the North Shore of Staten Island.

In June 1962, construction crews had reached a depth of 80 feet (24 m) in the Staten Island shaft and were excavating about five feet (1.5 m) of rock per day. By November 1962, the Staten Island shaft had been excavated to a depth of 350 feet (110 m) and the Brooklyn shaft had reached a depth of 100 feet (30 m), but mechanical problems and water seepage from areas of poor rock at the Staten Island shaft site had resulted in a six-month delay to the construction schedule. In February 1963, construction of the 18-foot-diameter (5.5 m) shaft on Staten Island had to be halted when sandhogs encountered a crack in the rock 488 feet (149 m) below the surface and had to use over one million pounds (450 t) of cement to seal the crack and prevent water from seeping into the shaft. When the Staten Island shaft reached a depth of 930 feet (280 m) in November 1963, sandhogs began enlarging the base of the shaft to provide additional work space to begin construction of the tunnel underneath the bay.

The contractors decided to use a tunnel boring machine (TBM) to remove rock for the tunnel and obtained exclusive rights to lease the Alkirk Hardrock Tunneler from the Lawrence Machine and Manufacturing Company for a five-year period. Use of the TBM was expected to take about a year to excavate the tunnel—half the amount of time that would be required compared to using conventional drilling and blasting techniques. The TBM was shipped by rail from Seattle and assembled at the base of the shaft site on Staten Island. The Alkirk Hardrock Tunneler had never been used before on a project. A series of breakdowns plagued operation of the TBM. No progress was made on tunnel excavation for a five-month period between March and August and only 76 feet (23 m) of tunnel was dug out by the TBM between August and October. In December 1964, Laborers Local Union No. 147 (the sandhogs union) asked the Board of Water Supply to stop allowing the contractors to use the TBM, alleging that they should not "finance and tolerate the delays involved in experimental work by the contractor." The union also explained their position why the use of the TBM should be stopped in an advertisement placed in the Staten Island Advance. After attempting use of the TBM for a total of two years and only excavating about 600 feet (180 m) of rock, the contractors decided to remove the TBM in March 1965 and instead use conventional construction methods.

Excavation of the tunnel was completed on December 1, 1966, with a ceremonial blast of dynamite triggered by Staten Island Borough President Robert T. Connor. The entire tunnel had been drilled from the Staten Island shaft due to restrictions at the Brooklyn shaft site that prevented simultaneous digging from both ends. Following the hole through, workers filled pre-stressed forms with cement to create a 10-foot-diameter (3.0 m) tube for the length of the excavated tunnel. The tunnel runs at a depth of approximately 900 feet (270 m) below the harbor.

=== Operation ===
Water began flowing through the completed Richmond Tunnel in September 1970, although it would not be operated at full capacity until other parts of the Richmond Project were completed—including the underground water tanks at Silver Lake Park, which were capable of storing 100 million US gallons (380,000 m^{3}), and an 84-inch (2.1 m) supply line running from a distribution chamber in Tompkinsville to the new underground storage tanks.

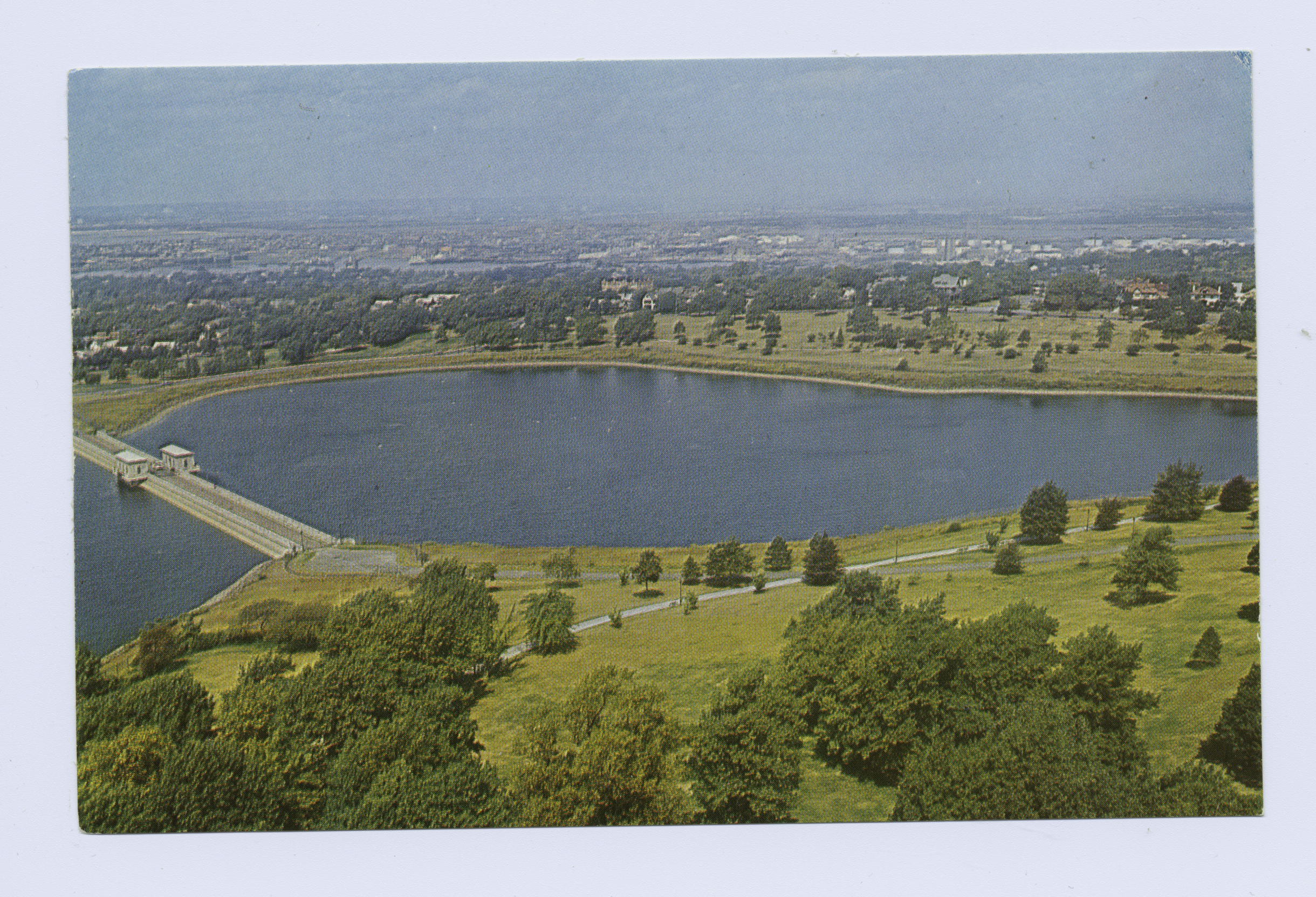
Silver Lake Reservoir in the 1990s, after it was decommissioned

The use of the existing siphons under the Narrows was discontinued after the Richmond Project was completed, but they were retained as a backup in case they were needed in an emergency. The Silver Lake Reservoir was decommissioned after the completion of the underground storage tanks below the park, which were placed into operation in July 1971. The water tanks at Silver Lake Park were the largest underground storage tanks in the world. Unlike the surface reservoir, the underground tanks were protected from pollution caused by air and sea gulls. They were also located 50 feet (15 m) higher in elevation compared to Silver Lake Reservoir, which provided increased water pressure to Staten Island.

In the future, the Richmond Tunnel will be connected to City Water Tunnel No. 3. When the Brooklyn and Queens section of City Water Tunnel No. 3 is placed into service (part of Stage Two of the project), it will be able to supply water to the Richmond Tunnel. The remaining work on Stage Two of the project involves the completion of two deep shafts, which are expected to be completed in 2032.

The original siphons under the Narrows, which later served as a backup to the Richmond Tunnel, were subsequently replaced by a newer siphon to accommodate a harbor deepening project; this dredged the Anchorage Channel through the Narrows to a depth of 50 feet (15 m), allowing the Port of New York and New Jersey to accommodate larger, "post-Panamax" container ships. Construction of the new siphon began in 2011 and involved the use of a TBM to excavate the tunnel. The project was delayed for an 18-month period as a result of Hurricane Sandy, which flooded the shaft and the tunnel with sea water. The new water tunnel was activated in 2016.
