= Anthony Gaeta =

American politician

Anthony R. Gaeta (September 8, 1927 – December 26, 1988) was a Staten Island, New York politician. A Democrat, Gaeta served as Staten Island's Borough President from 1977 to 1984. Over the course of 39 years in public service, Gaeta also held positions as a tax collector for the Real Property Assessment Bureau, as chief of staff to Congressman John M. Murphy, and as a city council member.

Gaeta was born in West Brighton and graduated from McKee High School in 1945. He served in the armed forces for a short time, and afterward continued his education at New York and Cornell Universities. His career as a public servant began in 1949.

As a staffer and an administrator, Gaeta worked to improve roads, sewers, and schools in Staten Island. He also worked on the creation of the Staten Island Greenbelt environmental program. Anthony R. Gaeta retired in 1984. He died of a heart attack on December 26, 1988.

Political offices
Preceded by Robert Lindsay	New York City Council, Staten Island At Large; 1972–1973	Succeeded by Edward V. Curry
Preceded by Saul Sharison	New York City Council, 1st district 1974–1977	Succeeded by Nicholas LaPorte
Preceded by Robert T. Connor	Borough President of Staten Island; 1977-1984	Succeeded by Ralph J. Lamberti
