= Ralph J. Lamberti =

American politician (1934–2025)

12th Borough President of Staten Island
- In office November 10, 1984 – December 31, 1989
- Preceded by: Anthony Gaeta
- Succeeded by: Guy Molinari

Personal details
- Born: Ralph James Lamberti; November 14, 1934 New York City, U.S.
- Died: June 14, 2025 (aged 90) New York City, U.S.
- Party: Democratic
- Spouse: Susan Lamberti
- Education: Wagner College

Military service
- Branch: United States Army
- Years of service: 1955–1957

Ralph James Lamberti (November 14, 1934 – June 14, 2025) was an American politician who served as borough president of Staten Island, New York from 1984 to 1989. He also held various public offices in Staten Island, including ten years as Deputy Borough President. As of 2026, Lamberti is the last Democratic Borough President of Staten Island.

== Early life ==
Ralph J. Lamberti was born on November 14, 1934, and raised in the West Brighton section of Staten Island. His grandparents settled in Staten Island shortly after arriving from Cava de' Tirreni, Italy, in 1899.

In the late 1940s, Lamberti attended Curtis High School and played football under Coach Andrew Barberi, who is considered one of the greatest football coaches in Staten Island history. Lamberti also attended Wagner College and the College of Staten Island.

From 1955 to 1957, Lamberti was enlisted in the United States Army, and was stationed at Fort Benning in Georgia.

== Career ==
=== Public service (1957–1984) ===
Lamberti held many roles in public service. In 1961, he was named acting assistant director of the Staten Island office of the state Department of Motor Vehicles, and was later appointed confidential assistant to the Motor Vehicles commissioner and the department's acting director of investigation.

In 1965, Lamberti ran as the Republican candidate for the State Assembly, but withdrew before the election.

In the mid-1960s, Lamberti became Business Administrator of New York State's Narcotics Control Center in Staten Island, a facility which in 1976, became the Arthur Kill Correctional Facility.

In 1972, he was appointed administrator to Staten Island Borough President Robert T. Connor, and switched to the Democratic Party in 1973. The following year, Lamberti was appointed Deputy Borough President of Staten Island by Connor, a position he held until 1984.

In 1976, Lamberti was the Democratic candidate for New York State Senate 24th District and lost to incumbent state Sen. John Marchi.

In 1977, he was re-appointed Deputy Borough President of Staten Island by Anthony Gaeta.

=== Borough President (1984–1989) ===
On November 10, 1984, Lamberti was sworn in as the 12th Borough President of Staten Island. In the ceremony he noted "My grandfather dug ditches and corked pipes for the water department ... Now, a century later, his grandson [has become] president of the borough he so cherished."

As Borough President, Lamberti created the "Harmony Street Fair," an annual celebration of the Island's growing ethnic diversity. Lamberti also created the action center, where members of his staff were assigned to take complaints about the city government from the public, and he was the first to donate funds to Project Hospitality.

In the late 1980s, Lamberti led staunch opposition to the proposed City Charter revision abolishing the New York City Board of Estimate. At the time, this board was responsible for budget and land-use decisions for the city. It gave the mayor, comptroller, and city council president each two votes on the board, while the five borough presidents each had one vote. The proposed revisions would significantly reduce the power of borough presidents and resulted in Lamberti, among other elected officials, making secession from New York City a political issue on Staten Island.

In 1986, Lamberti appointed a 15-member committee yesterday to study whether it was economically and legally feasible for Staten Island to secede from New York City, stating "We do not want to secede from the city of New York," but adding, "If you take away our voice in city government and reduce us to a spectator, we may have no other choice."

In 1987, Lamberti made a controversial deal with then New York City Mayor Ed Koch by which the four homeless shelters originally planned for Staten Island were not built in return for accepting a new city jail on Staten Island. In 1988, Lamberti announced that New York City had agreed to limit the jail from what was originally planned for 4,000 beds on a draft environmental impact statement to a limit of 1,000 beds, and stated that this amounted to "our fair share" of city jail space.

On March 22, 1989, the United States Supreme Court unanimously decided that the New York City Board of Estimate violated constitutional protections of one-man, one-vote – since Lamberti's vote, at that time represented about 400,000 Staten Islanders, and carried the same weight as Brooklyn Borough President Howard Golden's, representing 2.3 million. This decision led to Lamberti being the last Staten Island Borough President to serve on the Board of Estimate.

He was defeated in the 1989 by then-Congressman Guy Molinari, the first time in 20 years, that a Republican won this office. At the time of his death in 2025, Lamberti remained the most recent Democrat to serve as Borough President of Staten Island.

=== Later career (1990–2005) ===
Upon his departure from Borough Hall in 1990, Lamberti was appointed Executive Vice President of Staten Island University Hospital where he served for 15 years, retiring in 2005.

== Personal life and death ==
A lifelong Staten Islander, Lamberti lived with his wife in the Sunset Hill neighborhood. They had four adult children and five grandchildren.

Lamberti died from complications of Alzheimer's disease in Staten Island, on June 14, 2025, at the age of 90.

== Accolades ==
In 2001, NECO awarded Lamberti the Ellis Island Medal of Honor. This medal is presented to American citizens "who have distinguished themselves within their own ethnic groups while exemplifying the values of the American way of life".

In 2007, he was given the Outstanding Community Member Award by Wagner College. Wagner College honored Lamberti with an honorary Doctor of Humane Letters degree in May 2013.

St. John's University honored Lamberti with an honorary Doctor of Civil Law degree.

In 1991, the Staten Island Zoo named one of its wings in honor of Lamberti and named the attraction the Ralph Lamberti Tropical Rainforest.

== Committees ==
Lamberti served various roles on several Staten Island committees, including

- Chairman of Snug Harbor Cultural Center
- Chairman of the Wagner College DaVinci Society
- Chair of the Staten Island United Way
- Founder of the annual Harmony Street Fair
- President of the Staten Island Council of the Boy Scouts of America

He also served as a member of the boards of various charities and community service groups, including the American Red Cross, the Aid for Retarded Children, the VNA, the Heart Foundation, the Alzheimer's Association and the Parkinson's Disease Foundation.

Political offices
Preceded by Anthony Gaeta	Borough President of Staten Island; 1984–1989	Succeeded by Guy Molinari
