= Lucio F. Russo =

American politician

Lucio Russo

Member of the New York State Assembly
- In office January 1, 1953 – December 31, 1974
- Preceded by: Edward V. Curry
- Succeeded by: Guy Molinari
- Constituency: Richmond County's 2nd district (1953-1965); 64th district (1966); 58th district (1967-1972); 60th district (1973-1974)

Personal details
- Born: May 14, 1912 New Castle, Pennsylvania, U.S.
- Died: April 20, 2004 (aged 91) Boynton Beach, Florida, U.S.
- Party: Republican

Lucio Francis Russo (May 14, 1912 – April 20, 2004) was an American lawyer and politician from New York.

== Life ==
He was born on May 14, 1912, in New Castle, Pennsylvania. He graduated from Fordham Law School and practiced law in Staten Island. He entered politics as a Republican.

He was a member of the New York State Assembly from 1953 to 1974, sitting in the 169th, 170th, 171st, 172nd, 173rd, 174th, 175th, 176th, 177th, 178th, 178th and 179th New York State Legislatures. In 1974, he ran for re-nomination in the Republican primary but was defeated by Guy Molinari.

On April 20, 2004, Russo and his wife Tina were killed in a car crash in Boynton Beach, Florida, where they were living for the winter.

New York State Assembly
Preceded by Edward V. Curry	New York State Assembly; Richmond County, 2nd District; 1953–1965	Succeeded by district abolished
Preceded by new district	New York State Assembly; 64th District; 1966	Succeeded by John M. Burns
Preceded by Joseph Kottler	New York State Assembly; 58th District; 1967–1972	Succeeded by Joseph Lentol
Preceded by Louis DeSalvio	New York State Assembly; 60th District; 1973–1974	Succeeded by Guy Molinari
