= Gerard Kassar =

American political operative and journalist

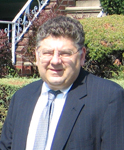

Chair of the New York Conservative Party
- Incumbent
- Assumed office 23 February 2019
- Preceded by: Michael R. Long

Personal details
- Born: New York City, U.S.
- Party: Conservative

Gerard Kassar, also known as Jerry Kassar, is an American political operative and former government official. He is currently the chairman of the Conservative Party of New York, a role he has served in since February 2019. Jerry succeeded longtime chairman Michael Long.

Kassar began his political working on campaigns for public office and holding official titles in the Conservative Party.

In January of 1989, he was elected the Brooklyn Conservative Party chairman and in 1992 he was elected New York State Conservative Party vice chairman.

In 1981 he was elected to be the national director of Young Americans for Freedom (YAF) at 22, a conservative youth group. He served as director through 1983.

Kassar held senior staff roles in the state assembly minority and as chief of staff to state senator Marty Golden. He was appointed by Governor Pataki and confirmed by the NYS Senate to be a commissioner of the interstate environmental commission in 1995.

He also served as the president of the Dyker Heights civic association in Brooklyn NY and on the board of trustees of the former Victory Memorial Hospital.

Additionally, he writes a weekly column for the publication The Brooklyn Reporter.

Kassar is a lifelong resident of Brooklyn, New York where he resides in the Dyker Heights community with his wife, Janet.
