= Eldon R. Clingan =

American politician

Eldon R. Clingan is an American accountant and former Liberal Party of New York politician from New York City. In his youth, he was a member of the League for Industrial Democracy and national chair of the Young People's Socialist League from 1958 to 1959.

Clingan served in the New York City Council representing a Manhattan, New York at-large district from 1970 to 1973. He served as Minority Leader of that body from also from 1970 to 1973 and helped to introduce Intro 475, civil rights legislation that would have prohibited discrimination on the grounds of sexual orientation. The bill was defeated.

In later years Clingan served as the President of the National Society of Accountants from 2004 to 2005.

Political offices
Preceded by Carlos M. Rios	New York City Council, Manhattan At-Large District; 1970–1973	Succeeded by Robert F. Wagner, III
Preceded by Angelo J. Arculeo	Minority Leader, New York City Council; 1970–1973	Succeeded by Angelo J. Arculeo
