= Robert Molinari =

American politician from New York

S. Robert Molinari

Member of the New York State Assembly from the Richmond County 2nd district
- In office January 1, 1943 – December 31, 1944
- Preceded by: Albert V. Maniscalco
- Succeeded by: Edmund P. Radigan

Personal details
- Born: February 22, 1898 Amantea
- Died: May 31, 1957 (aged 59) Brooklyn, New York
- Party: Republican
- Spouse: Elizabeth Majoros
- Children: Guy Molinari
- Education: New York University
- Profession: Real estate broker

Sigmund Robert Molinari (born Sigismondo Berengario Nicola Molinari; February 22, 1898 – May 31, 1957) was an American politician from New York. Molinari, who served one term in the New York State Assembly, was "the first Italian immigrant to serve in the New York state Assembly."

== Life ==
He was born in Italy the town of Amantea to parents Gaetano Molinari and Mariantonia Perciavalle, and graduated from New York University. Before entering politics, he was a real estate broker on Staten Island. He worked as an appraiser and property manager for the New York City Bureau of Real Estate from 1941 until his election.

He was a member of the New York State Assembly (Richmond Co., 2nd D.) in 1943 and 1944, elected on the Republican ticket. In 1944, he ran for re-election on the Democratic ticket, Molinari but was defeated by Republican Edmund P. Radigan. In 1948, he lost a race for the Republican nomination for the New York State Senate. He ran unsuccessfully for the party's nomination for Staten Island borough president in 1953.

S. Robert Molinari died May 31, 1957, at the age of 59.

He was the father of Guy Molinari (1928-2018), who served in the United States House of Representatives and as borough president of Staten Island; and grandfather of U.S. Representative Susan Molinari (born 1958). He lived in New Dorp, Staten Island.

New York State Assembly
Preceded by Albert V. Maniscalco	Member of the New York State Assembly from the Richmond County 2nd district 1943–1944	Succeeded by Edmund P. Radigan
