= Robert Lindsay (New York politician) =

American politician (1894–1972)

Robert G. Lindsay (October 28, 1894 – May 1972) was an American Democratic Party politician from the New York City borough of Staten Island. He represented that borough in the New York City Council from 1964 to 1972.

Political offices
Preceded by Newly Created District	New York City Council, Staten Island At-Large District; 1964–1972	Succeeded by Anthony Gaeta
