= Bill Paxon =

American politician and lobbyist

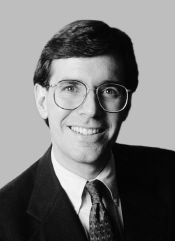

Member of the U.S. House of Representatives from New York
- In office January 3, 1989 – January 3, 1999
- Preceded by: Jack Kemp
- Succeeded by: Thomas M. Reynolds
- Constituency: 31st district (1989–1993); 27th district (1993–1999)

Member of the New York State Assembly from the 147th district
- In office January 1, 1983 – December 31, 1988
- Preceded by: Richard L. Kennedy
- Succeeded by: Thomas M. Reynolds

Member of the Erie County Legislature from the 17th district
- In office 1978–1982
- Preceded by: Norman Wolf
- Succeeded by: Ralph Mohr

Personal details
- Born: Leon William Paxon; April 29, 1954 (age 72) Akron, New York, U.S.
- Party: Republican
- Spouse: Susan Molinari (m. 1994)
- Children: 2
- Relatives: Guy Molinari (father-in-law)
- Education: Canisius University (BA)

Leon William Paxon (born April 29, 1954) is an American lobbyist and former member of the United States House of Representatives from New York. From 1989 to 1999, he served five terms in Congress.

== Early life ==
Paxon was born in Akron, New York, near Buffalo. At the age of 15, Paxon volunteered for the first congressional campaign of former Buffalo Bills quarterback Jack Kemp.

Paxon graduated from St. Joseph's Collegiate Institute high school in 1972, and then from Canisius College. He was elected to the Erie County Legislature in November 1977 at the age of 23, making him the youngest member ever when elected. In addition, he holds honorary doctorates from Daemen College, Roberts Wesleyan College and Canisius College.

== Political career ==
Paxon was a member of the New York State Assembly from 1983 to 1988, sitting in the 185th, 186th and 187th New York State Legislatures.

=== Congress ===
Following Kemp's announcement not to seek re-election to a tenth term, Paxon ran successfully for the open seat. He was elected to the 101st, 102nd, 103rd, 104th and 105th United States Congresses, holding office from January 3, 1989, to January 3, 1999. Paxon chaired the Republican House Leadership committee during the 105th Congress. In 1992, Paxon was elected to chair the National Republican Congressional Committee.

==== Leadership challenge ====
In the summer of 1997 several House Republicans, who saw Newt Gingrich's public image as a liability, attempted to replace him as Speaker. The challenge began July 9 with a meeting between Republican conference chairman John Boehner of Ohio and Republican leadership chairman Paxon. According to their plan, House Majority Leader Dick Armey, House Majority Whip Tom DeLay, Boehner and Paxon were to present Gingrich with an ultimatum: resign, or be voted out. However, Armey balked at the proposal to make Paxon the new Speaker, and told his chief of staff to warn Gingrich about the coup.

On July 11, Gingrich met with senior Republican leadership to assess the situation. He explained that under no circumstance would he step down. If he was voted out, there would be a new election for Speaker, which would allow for the possibility that Democrats, along with dissenting Republicans, would vote in Dick Gephardt as Speaker. On July 16, Paxon offered to resign his post, feeling he had not handled the situation correctly, as the only member of the leadership who had been appointed to his position, by Gingrich, instead of elected. Gingrich accepted Paxon's resignation and directed Paxon to immediately vacate his leadership office space.

Paxon later considered, then rejected, a challenge to Armey's post as majority leader. He instead decided that he would not run for re-election in 1998.

== Later career ==
After leaving Congress, Paxon became an advisor to GOP congressional members.

Following his 21-year public service career, Paxon joined the law firm of Akin Gump Strauss Hauer & Feld LLP, where, since January 1999, he has advised a wide range of public and private sector clients on policy issues. He has consistently been rated one of Washington's top lobbyists.

Paxon was hired by Boeing to lobby members of Congress.

== Political activities ==
In 2024, Paxon and his wife campaigned and voted for the Democratic ticket of Kamala Harris and Tim Walz.

== Personal life ==
While in Congress, the conservative Paxon worked closely with moderate then Rep. Susan Molinari R-Staten Island, who is now a lobbyist. They married on July 3, 1994, and live in Alexandria, Virginia. They have two daughters.

U.S. House of Representatives
Preceded by Jack Kemp	Member of the U.S. House of Representatives from New York's 31st congressional district 1989–1993	Succeeded by Amo Houghton
Preceded by James T. Walsh	Member of the U.S. House of Representatives from New York's 27th congressional district 1993–1999	Succeeded by Thomas M. Reynolds
Party political offices
Preceded by Guy Vander Jagt	Chair of the National Republican Congressional Committee; 1993–1997	Succeeded by John Linder
Preceded by Bob Walker	Chair of House Republican Leadership; 1997	Vacant Title next held by Rob Portman; 2001
U.S. order of precedence (ceremonial)
Preceded by Floyd Flake as Former U.S. Representative	Order of precedence of the United States as Former U.S. Representative	Succeeded by Thomas M. Reynolds as Former U.S. Representative
