= Hoffman Island =

Artificial island in Lower New York Bay

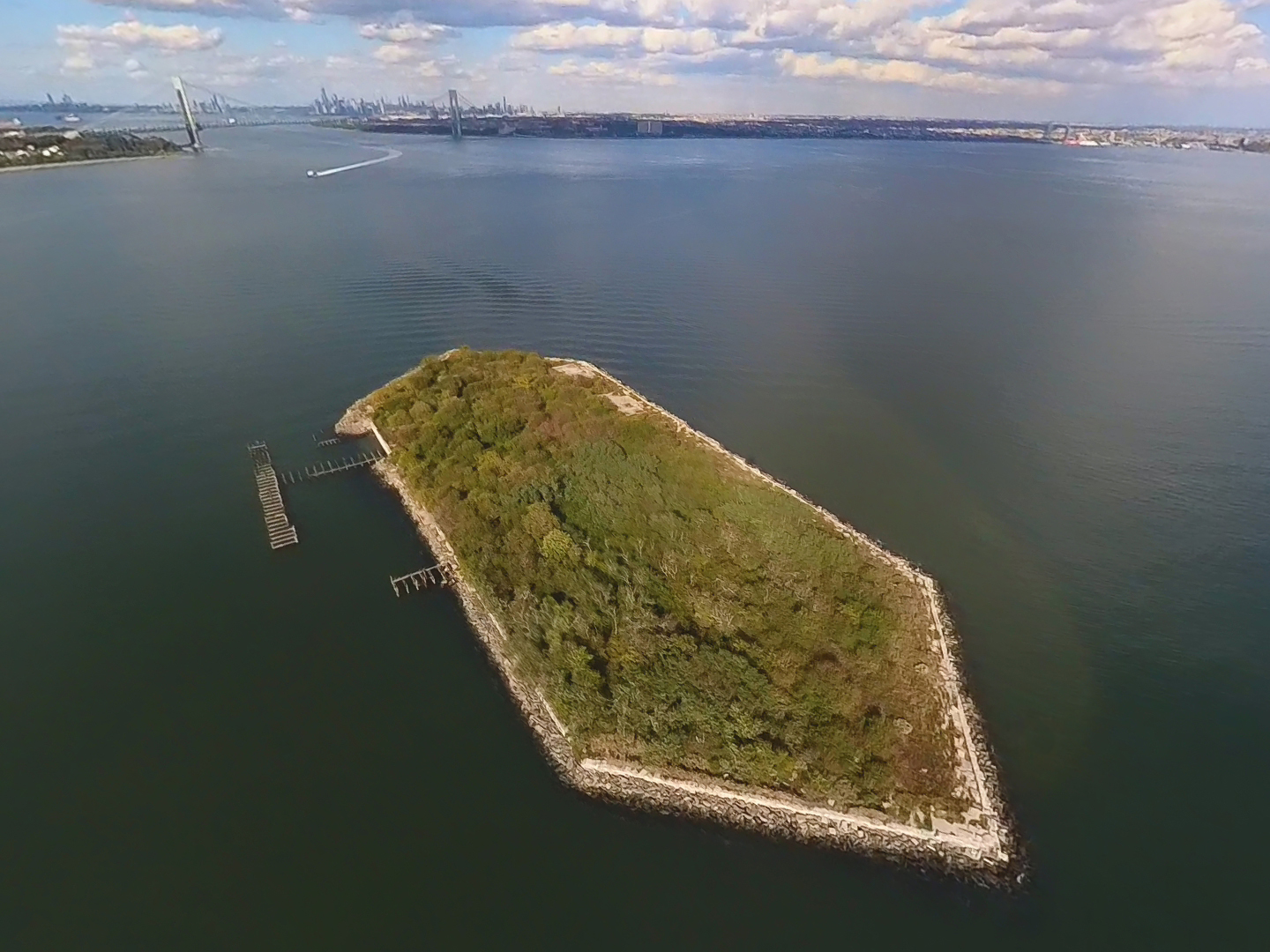
- Interactive map of Hoffman Island

Geography
- Location: Lower New York Bay
- Coordinates: 40.578873°N 74.053688°W
- Area: 11 acres (4.5 ha)

Administration
- United States
- State: New York
- City: New York City
- Borough: Staten Island

Hoffman Island is an 11-acre (4.5 ha) artificial island in Lower New York Bay, off the South Beach of Staten Island, New York City. It is not open to the public and is owned by the government for wildlife protection. A smaller, 4-acre (1.6 ha) artificial island, Swinburne Island, lies immediately to the south. Created in 1873 upon the Orchard Shoal by the addition of land fill, the island is named for former New York City mayor (1866–1868) and New York Governor (1869–1871) John Thompson Hoffman.

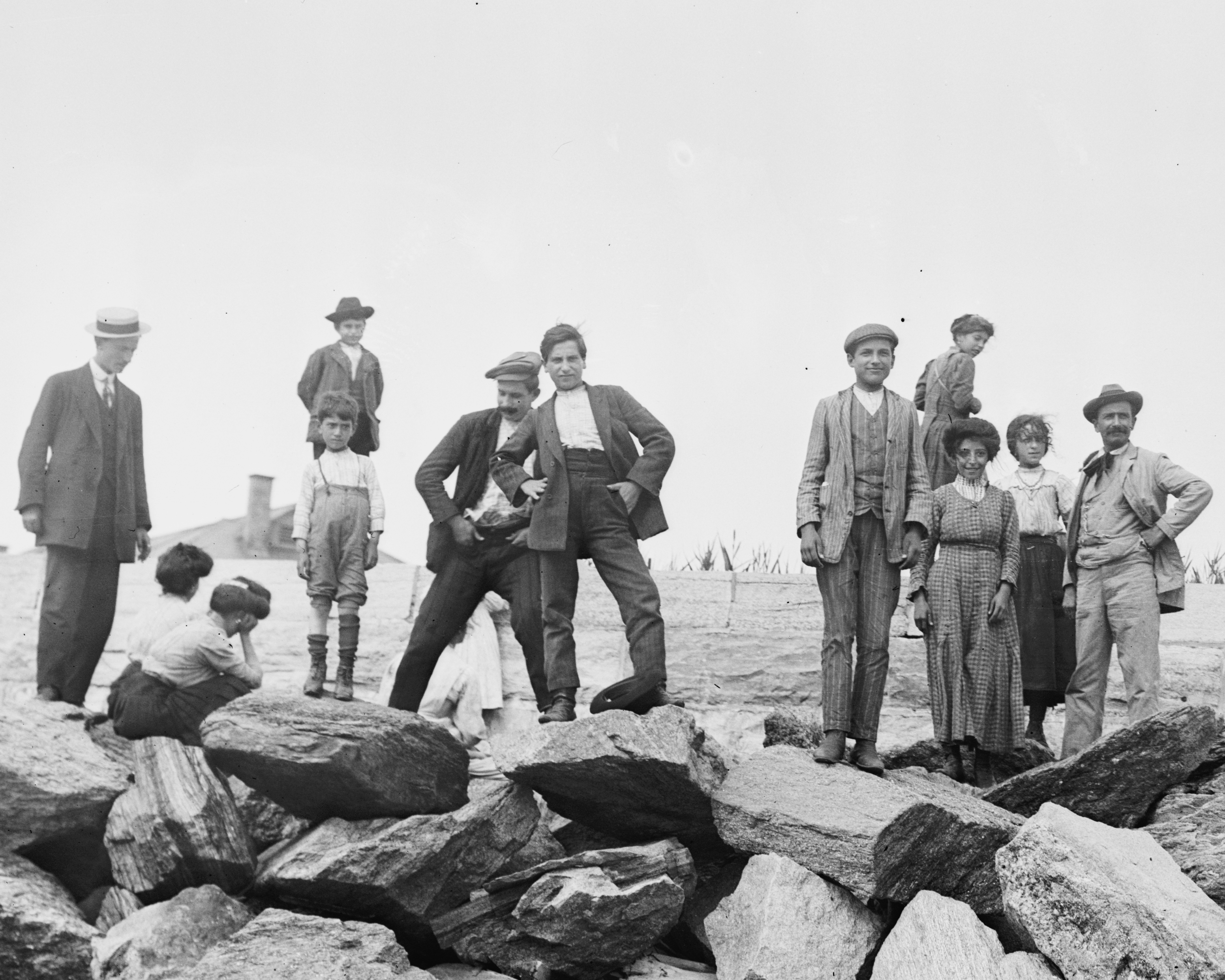
Quarantined persons on Hoffman Island between 1910 and 1915

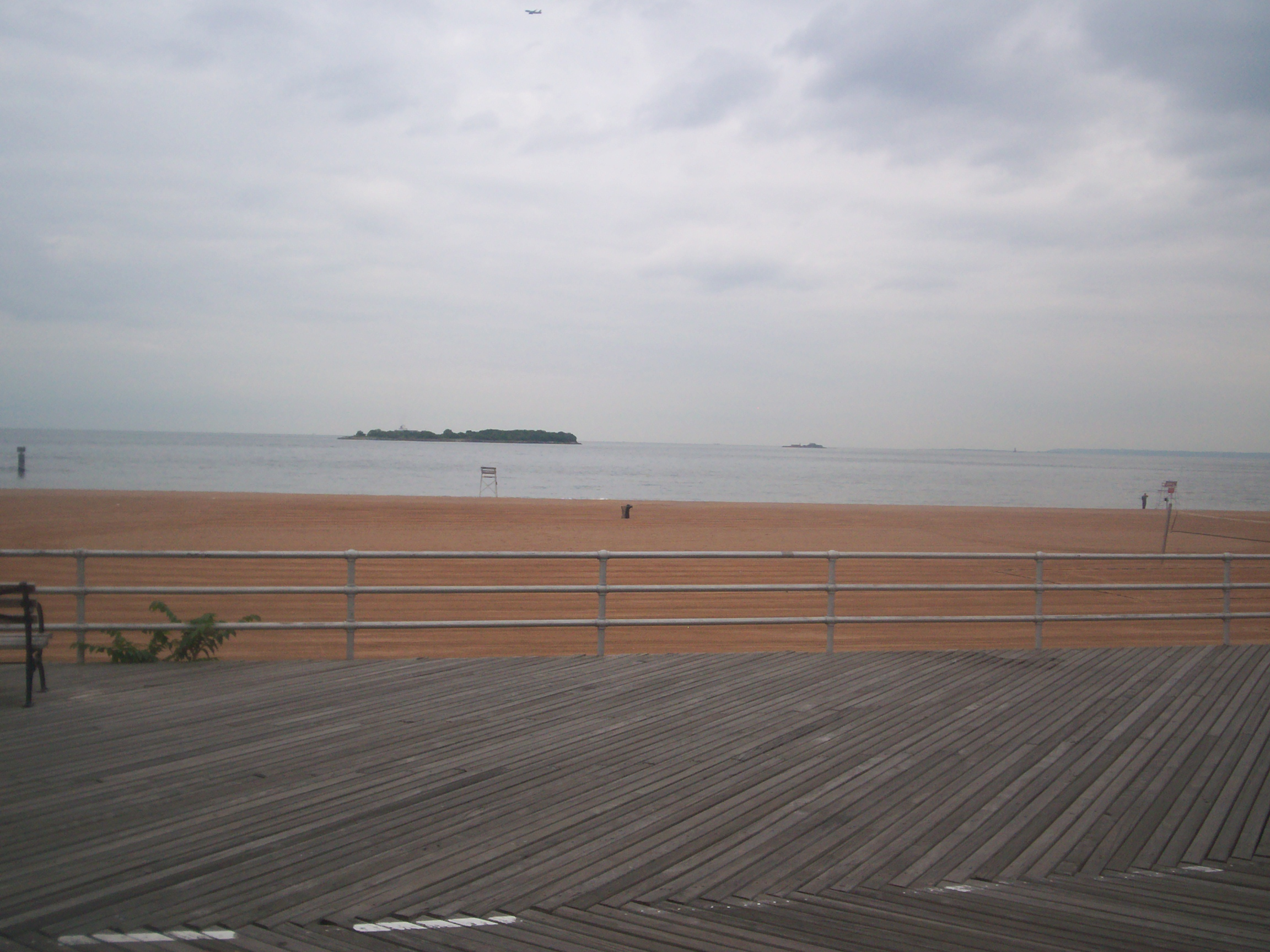
Hoffman Island on the left and Swinburne Island on the right, as seen from South Beach-Franklin Delano Roosevelt Boardwalk at South Beach, Staten Island

During the late 1800s and early 1900s, Hoffman and Swinburne Islands were used as a quarantine station, housing immigrants who, upon their arrival at the immigrant inspection station at nearby Ellis Island, presented with symptoms of contagious diseases.

== World War II ==
Starting in 1938 and extending through World War II, the United States Merchant Marine used Hoffman and Swinburne Islands as a training station. The Quonset huts built during this period are no longer evident on Hoffman Island. As of 2017, their remnants remain on Swinburne Island. During World War II the islands also served as anchorages for anti-submarine nets intended to protect New York Bay and its associated shipping/naval activities, from enemy submarines entering from the Atlantic Ocean.

== Post–World War II ==
Since World War II, several proposals for utilizing Hoffman and Swinburne Islands have been presented. In the 1950s, city planner Robert Moses and political consultant Bernard Baruch advocated transforming the islands into a city park, but this plan was not realized. In 1962, the New York City Board of Estimate had approved the purchase of rock excavated from the Richmond Tunnel for a bulkhead to join the two islands, but the rock dug out from the tunnel was of poor quality and was instead dumped on the North Shore of Staten Island.

In 1965 on Hoffman Island, eleven people, including the filmmaker Leon Gast, were arrested on charges including trespassing and indecent exposure for their roles in creating a Nudie film on the island.

In the 1980s, in response to plans of New York City to open new homeless shelters amidst Staten Island's residential neighborhoods, some of the potentially affected residents proposed a never-implemented plan to construct a homeless shelter on Hoffman Island, Swinburne Island or both.

== Current use ==
Hoffman and Swinburne islands are managed by the National Park Service, as part of the Staten Island Unit of Gateway National Recreation Area. The island was transferred from the city to the National Park Service in 1974. To protect the islands' avian residents, which include great egret, snowy egret, black-crowned night heron, glossy ibis, double-crested cormorant and great black-backed gull, the island is off limits to the public. Beginning in 2001, harbor seals have been observed wintering on and near the islands.
