= John H. Ray =

American politician

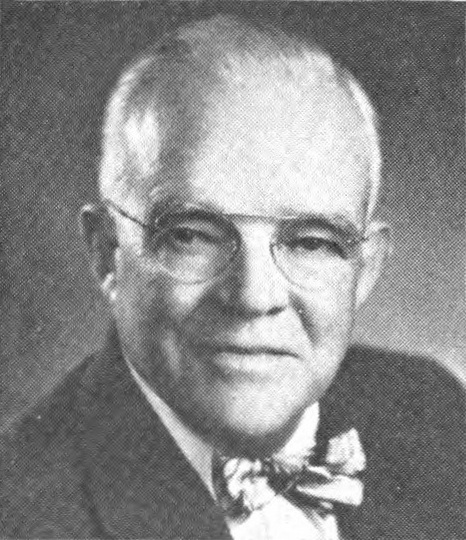

Member of the U.S. House of Representatives from New York's 15th district
- In office January 3, 1953 – January 3, 1963
- Preceded by: James J. Murphy (redistricting)
- Succeeded by: John M. Murphy (redistricting)

Personal details
- Born: John Henry Ray; September 27, 1886 Mankato, Minnesota, U.S.
- Died: May 21, 1975 (aged 88) Staten Island, New York, U.S.
- Party: Republican
- Education: University of Minnesota; Harvard Law School

John Henry Ray (September 27, 1886 – May 21, 1975) was an American lawyer, business executive, and politician who served as a U.S. representative from New York as a member of the Republican Party. He served five terms in Congress representing the state's 15th district, which at the time encompassed parts of Staten Island and Brooklyn.

== Biography ==
=== Early life ===
Ray was born in Mankato, Minnesota. After graduating from the University of Minnesota in 1908 and Harvard Law School in 1911, Ray practiced law and was an assistant trust officer for the Wells–Dickey Trust Company in Minneapolis.

He joined the U.S. Army during World War I, serving first as a first lieutenant in the Judge Advocate General's Corps, and then an assistant to the special representative of Secretary of War Newton D. Baker during post-war armistice discussions with Allied governments. In 1920, he was presented with the Order of the Crown of Italy for his work with the Italian government.

=== Professional career ===
Ray moved to the New York City neighborhood of Dongan Hills in 1923 and continued to practice law. In 1937, he became vice president and general counsel for Western Electric, and in 1942, he was promoted to vice president and general counsel of AT&T, a position he held until retiring in 1951.

=== Political career ===
Representing New York, Ray was first elected to Congress in 1952 at the age of 66. He was reelected four times and served from January 3, 1953 until January 3, 1963 (the 83rd, 84th, 85th, 86th, and 87th Congresses). Ray voted in favor of the Civil Rights Act of 1960, but voted against the Civil Rights Act of 1957 and the 24th Amendment to the Constitution. While in the House, his committee assignments included being appointed to the Merchant Marine and Judiciary Committees. He sought the establishment of tax-free pensions, and to give tax breaks to firms purchasing anti-pollution equipment. In addition, Ray served as legal advisor to then-Congressman Gerald Ford when Ford was a member of the Warren Commission.

Following the results of the 1960 Census, Representative Ray was redistricted into the new 16th district. He chose to retire rather than seek reelection in the new constituency in 1962; that year, his seat was won by Democrat John Murphy.

=== Later life ===
In retirement, Ray continued to live in Staten Island, where he died on May 21, 1975. He was cremated.
