= Edmund P. Radigan =

American businessman and politician

Edmund P. Radigan (January 7, 1889 – April 1968) was an American businessman and politician from New York.

== Life ==
He was born on January 7, 1889, in New York City. In 1915, he married Anna Margaret Rosenberger, and their only child was Edmund P. Radigan, Jr. (1918–2007). He lived in Stapleton, Staten Island, and retailed office machines. He entered politics as a Republican.

He was a member of the New York State Assembly from 1945 to 1948, sitting in the 165th and 166th New York State Legislatures. In 1946, the New York City authorities planned to establish a garbage dump on Staten Island. As an answer, Radigan introduced in the Assembly in 1947 a bill for the secession of the borough of Staten Island from the City of New York. The bill was defeated, and the garbage dump project was abandoned.

He died in April 1968.

New York State Assembly
Preceded by S. Robert Molinari	New York State Assembly; Richmond County, 2nd District; 1945–1948	Succeeded by Edward V. Curry
