= Jack Muratori =

American politician

Jack Muratori (1929 – May 20, 2001) was a Republican Party lawmaker from Queens, New York who represented a Queens, At-Large New York City Council district from 1974 to 1983. He also served as Minority Leader in 1983.

After leaving politics he served as an executive of the King Kullen supermarket chain. Muratori died of cancer on May 20, 2001 at the age of 72. At the time of his death he had been residing in both Flushing, Queens and Point Lookout, Long Island with his wife Rosemary. Along with his wife Rosemary he left behind three daughters and three sons.

Political offices
| Preceded by Alvin Frankenberg | New York City Council, Queens At-Large District; 1974–1983 | Succeeded by District Eliminated |
| Preceded by Angelo J. Arculeo | Minority Leader, New York City Council; 1983 | Succeeded by Susan Molinari |
