= Alvin Frankenberg =

American lawyer

Alvin Frankenberg (December 30, 1923 – June 25, 2011) was an American lawyer and Liberal Party of New York politician who served as Queens New York City Council councilman-at-large as a Democrat from 1970 to 1973.

A Bronx, New York native, Frankenberg enlisted in the United States Marine Corps during World War II. Upon returning from the war he enrolled in City College of New York, he received a law degree from New York Law School and started his own law practice. From 1970 to 1973 he served in the New York City Council. He also served as a Deputy Commissioner of the New York State Department of Motor Vehicles, counsel to the speaker of the New York Assembly, and as a New York City Marshal.

Political offices
Preceded by Joseph Modugno	New York City Council, Queens At-Large District; 1970–1973	Succeeded by Jack Muratori
