= Guy Molinari =

American politician (1928–2018)

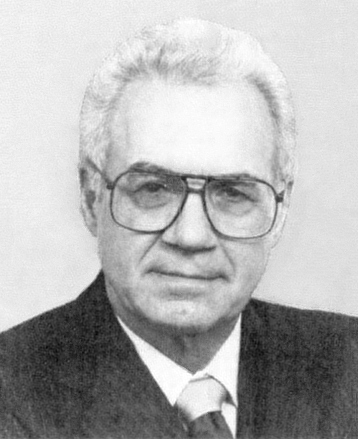
- Molinari in 1987

13th Borough President of Staten Island
- In office January 1, 1990 – December 31, 2001
- Preceded by: Ralph J. Lamberti
- Succeeded by: James Molinaro

Member of the U.S. House of Representatives from New York
- In office January 3, 1981 – December 31, 1989
- Preceded by: John M. Murphy
- Succeeded by: Susan Molinari
- Constituency: 17th district (1981–1983); 14th district (1983–1989)

Member of the New York State Assembly from the 60th district
- In office January 1, 1975 – December 31, 1980
- Preceded by: Lucio F. Russo
- Succeeded by: Robert Straniere

Personal details
- Born: Gaetano Victor Molinari; November 23, 1928 New York City, U.S.
- Died: July 25, 2018 (aged 89) New York City, U.S.
- Party: Republican
- Spouse: Marguerite Wing (m. 1956; died 2008)
- Children: Susan Molinari
- Parents: S. Robert Molinari (father); Elizabeth Margaret (Majoros) (mother)
- Education: Wagner College (BA); New York Law School (LLB)

Military service
- Branch/service: United States Marine Corps
- Years of service: 1951–1953
- Rank: Sergeant
- Battles/wars: Korean War

Gaetano Victor Molinari (November 23, 1928 – July 25, 2018) was an American lawyer and Republican politician from New York City. He represented Staten Island in the United States House of Representatives for four terms (1981–1989), and then served 12 years as Staten Island borough president (1990–2002). His daughter, Susan Molinari, also served as a U.S. representative.

== Education and military service ==
Gaetano Kenneth Molinari, "who changed his middle name as a teenager to Victor" was born on Manhattan's Lower East Side. His father was S. Robert Molinari (1897–1957), "the first Italian immigrant to serve in the New York state Assembly," representing the 2nd District of Richmond County in the New York State Assembly from 1943 to 1944. After changing from a Republican to a Democrat, Molinari's father was not reelected. His mother, Elizabeth Margaret (Majoros), was of Czechoslovak descent.

Molinari attended private schools growing up and graduated from New Dorp High School in Staten Island in 1945. He attained a Bachelor of Arts degree from Staten Island's Wagner College in 1949 and his law degree from New York Law School in 1951. He served in the United States Marine Corps (attaining the rank of sergeant), from 1951 to 1953 during the Korean War. He was admitted to the New York State Bar following his discharge from the military in 1953 and commenced practice in Staten Island.

== Political career ==
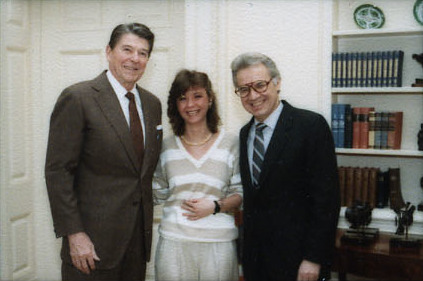
Molinari and his daughter Susan with President Ronald Reagan in 1984

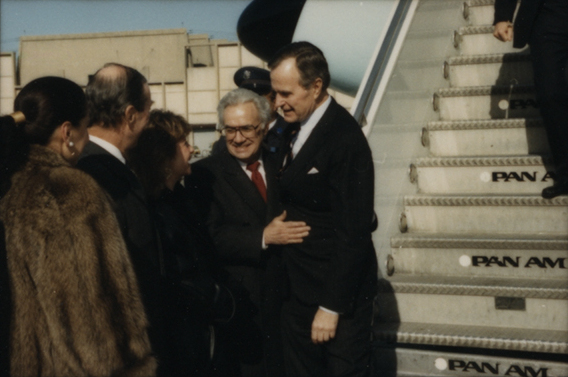
Molinari with President George H. W. Bush in 1989

Molinari was a Republican member of the New York State Assembly from 1975 to 1980, sitting in the 181st, 182nd and 183rd New York State Legislatures. He was a delegate to the New York State Republican conventions in 1979 and the Republican National Convention in both 1980 and 1984.

In 1980, he was elected to the House of Representatives, unseating nine-term Democrat John M. Murphy. The district included all of Staten Island and most of Lower Manhattan. In 1982, his district lost its share of Manhattan, and was instead merged with a Brooklyn-based district that was held by four-term Democrat Leo Zeferetti. He won with 57% of the vote, and was reelected to the three succeeding Congresses with minimal opposition and served from January 3, 1981.

On December 31, 1989, Molinari resigned to become Borough President of Staten Island. He was succeeded by his daughter, Susan, who also served on the New York City Council. He served as Borough President from January 1, 1990, to December 31, 2001.

In 1994, a week before the statewide elections, Molinari announced his view that Karen Burstein, the Democratic nominee for New York Attorney General, was not qualified to serve as attorney general because she was a lesbian. The combination of Molinari's remarks, a strong national Republican showing, and the win of George Pataki in the governor's race, led to Republican Dennis Vacco's narrowly defeating Burstein. The New York Times called his remarks "gutter politics".

In 1995, Molinari ran for Richmond County District Attorney. He lost the race to Democratic incumbent, William L. Murphy.

== A Life of Service (book) ==
Molinari co-authored his autobiography A Life of Service with former NYC Police Lieutenant Patricia Feerick-Kossman, a highly decorated cop, lawyer, and registered nurse. In 1990, with a search warrant still pending, she had launched a technically legal random door-to-door search that went beyond legal bounds.

Feerick-Kossman, after five years of appeals, began to serve her sentence for having illegally searched for a stolen police radio. Molinari successfully lobbied Governor George Pataki to commute her sentence, and she was released a month later. Her law license was returned in 2000.

The book, whose start can be traced to Feerick's pushing, discusses Molinari's success at convincing a then age 44 Rudy Giuliani to run for mayor of NYC, Giuliani's push for Molinari to run for Staten Island's borough president, and the (2001) closing of Fresh Kills Landfill, "the largest .. in the world."

== Personal life ==
Guy Molinari's daughter Susan succeeded him as a member of Congress. She is married to Bill Paxon, a former United States House Representative from Buffalo.

== Death and legacy ==
Guy Molinari died of pneumonia on July 25, 2018, at the age of 89.

In September 2003, a new Staten Island Ferry boat was built and was christened the Guy V. Molinari; it joined the New York City Department of Transportation fleet in September 2004, a year later. The boat continues to transport commuters and tourists between Staten Island and Manhattan.

James S. A. Corey's novel Leviathan Wakes and its television adaptation, The Expanse, featured a spaceship named for Molinari.

New York State Assembly
Preceded by Lucio F. Russo	Member of the New York State Assembly from the 60th district 1975–1980	Succeeded by Robert Straniere
U.S. House of Representatives
Preceded by John M. Murphy	Member of the U.S. House of Representatives from New York's 17th congressional district 1981–1983	Succeeded by Ted Weiss
Preceded by Frederick W. Richmond	Member of the U.S. House of Representatives from New York's 14th congressional district 1983–1989	Succeeded by Susan Molinari
Political offices
Preceded by Ralph J. Lamberti	Borough President of Staten Island; 1990–2001	Succeeded by James Molinaro
Party political offices
Preceded by Anthony M. Vittorioso	Republican nominee for District Attorney of Richmond County; 1995	Succeeded by Catherine M. DiDomenico
