= Susan Molinari =

American politician (born 1958)

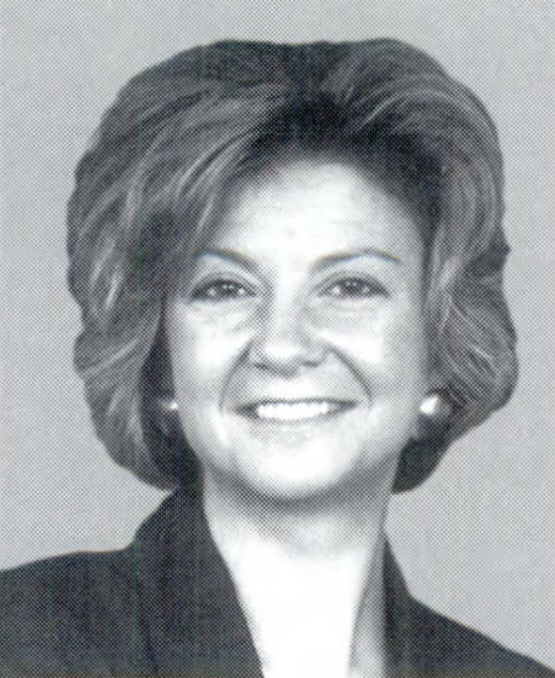

Vice Chair of the House Republican Conference
- In office January 3, 1995 – July 17, 1997
- Leader: Newt Gingrich
- Preceded by: Bill McCollum
- Succeeded by: Jennifer Dunn

Member of the U.S. House of Representatives from New York
- In office March 20, 1990 – August 2, 1997 (Note: Molinari's official service begins on the date of the special election, while she was not sworn in until March 27, 1990.)
- Preceded by: Guy Molinari
- Succeeded by: Vito Fossella
- Constituency: 14th district (1990–1993); 13th district (1993–1997)

Member of the New York City Council from the 1st district
- In office January 1, 1986 – March 20, 1990
- Preceded by: Frank Fossella
- Succeeded by: Fred Cerullo

Personal details
- Born: March 27, 1958 (age 68) New York City, New York, U.S.
- Party: Republican
- Spouses: John Lucchesi (m. 1988; div. 1992); Bill Paxon (m. 1994)
- Children: 2
- Parent: Guy Molinari (father)
- Education: State University of New York, Albany (BA)

Susan Molinari (born March 27, 1958) is an American politician. A member of the Republican Party, she sat in the U.S. House of Representatives from 1990 to 1997, representing Staten Island for three terms. Molinari, who was considered a rising star in the party, was selected to deliver the keynote address at the 1996 Republican National Convention. However, the next year, she resigned from Congress to become a television journalist for CBS News. Later, she became a vice president for public policy at Google from 2012 to 2018.

== Early life, education and early political career ==
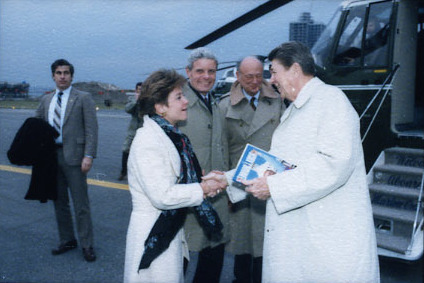
Molinari greeting President Ronald Reagan in 1985

Molinari was born in Staten Island, New York, the daughter of Marguerite (Wing) and lawyer and perennial Republican politician Guy Molinari. She is the granddaughter of Italian-born Republican politician S. Robert Molinari.

She graduated from the then SUNY Albany (now called the University at Albany, The State University of New York). She served on the New York City Council before winning a special election to the House of Representatives in 1990 as a Republican to replace her father, who retired from Congress to become Staten Island Borough President.

Molinari is a member of the Advisory Board for WeProtect which is a global non-profit cooperation with the goal to protect children online and stop the crime of online child sexual abuse and exploitation.

== U.S. House of Representatives ==
=== Elections ===
1990

On January 1, 1990, her father, incumbent Republican U.S. Representative Guy Molinari, decided to resign in order to become Borough President of Staten Island. She ran for her father's seat in Staten Island-based 14th congressional district. On the eve of the special election, The New York Times endorsed Molinari because she "promises to add a moderate Republican voice to the city's Democratic-dominated congressional delegation". In March 1990, she defeated Robert Gigante 59% to 35%.

1992

After redistricting, she ran in New York's 13th congressional district. She won the Republican primary with 75%. In the general election, she defeated NYC Councilmember Sal Albanese 56%–38% and was elected to her first full term.

1994

She won re-election to her second full term with 71% of the vote.

1996

She won re-election to her third full term with 62% of the vote. She resigned effective August 2, 1997.

=== Tenure ===
While in the House of Representatives, Molinari was among the more moderate and liberal members of the Republican Party.

She signed on to the Republicans' 1994 Contract with America, which promised a balanced budget amendment to the U.S. Constitution, and opposed the placing of U.S. troops under UN command. Concerning social policy, she leaned more liberal than many of her Republican colleagues. Molinari supported abortion rights, but stated on CNN in January 2012 that, after having children, she is now anti-abortion. She also sided with the Democrats in voting for the Family and Medical Leave Act (FMLA), a cornerstone of Bill Clinton's social policy. She offset these positions with her own standing as a new mother, framing her outlook in terms of "family values", and in fact energetically campaigned for fellow Republicans with whom she disagreed on both abortion and FMLA. She favored reduction of Social Security taxes, middle class tax cuts, and tax credits for families. Molinari worked with Christopher O. Ward to acquire the Staten Island Railroad to re-establish freight service to the Howland Hook Marine Terminal.

On issues of crime and punishment, she favored extended use of the federal death penalty and other restrictions. Molinari is also remembered for her role as principal sponsor of Federal Rules of Evidence 413-15. As Molinari put it on the House floor in 1994, the rules "strengthen the legal system's tools for bringing the perpetrators of these atrocious crimes to justice."

In her autobiography she intimated that the tense ideological atmosphere within the Republican Party after they won majority in the House and Georgian Newt Gingrich became Speaker contributed to her unease. Molinari gave the keynote speech at the 1996 Republican National Convention, but resigned from the House in June 1997 to take a job as a television journalist for CBS.

=== Committee assignments ===
When first elected, she received assignments on the Small Business Committee and Public Works committees. In the 102nd Congress (1991–1993), she traded those assignments to take a seat on the Education and Labor Committee. When the Republicans took control of the House in the 104th Congress (1995–1997), Molinari traded in her Education/Labor seat for a place on the House Budget Committee.

She was vice chairwoman of the Republican Conference and Republican Policy Committee.

== Post-congressional career ==
=== Journalism ===
At CBS, Molinari was co-host of news program CBS This Morning for about nine months until 1998. Her hiring was controversial from the very beginning; Although Molinari had earned degrees in communication, her major professional credentials were political, and her main national public recognition came from her speech at the Republican National Convention. Media critics asked whether a partisan politician could reasonably be expected to maintain objectivity. Others at the time criticized her on-air demeanor as either too "stiff" or too "perky", or attacked her interviews as superficial. Conservatives accused her of "selling out". Although allegedly CBS had first tried to respond to these criticisms by switching Molinari into "home and garden" journalism, the official comment from CBS executives was that they thought her better suited to political commentary, and had no such position available.

Molinari announced she was pregnant at the end of her nine-month run at CBS. Her second child was born in late January 1999.

Molinari later hosted a public affairs show called The Flipside and has been a frequent guest commentator on major political talk shows.

=== Lobbying and consulting ===
After a stint as a lobbyist on her own, Molinari joined the Washington Group in October 2001, becoming the lobbying firm's president and chief executive.

Molinari joined the law and public policy firm Bracewell & Giuliani in 2008 as a senior principal. The firm is home to former New York City Mayor Rudolph Giuliani and has a well-established government relations and strategic communications practice. Previously, she was president of Ketchum Public Affairs and also was chief executive officer of Ketchum Inc.'s lobbying firm, The Washington Group, where she was its chairman. In 2006 Molinari's firm received $300,062 from home mortgage giant Freddie Mac to lobby on their behalf.

Molinari supports the Rape Abuse and Incest National Network (RAINN), which operates a telephone hotline in conjunction with more than 1,000 rape crisis centers nationwide. The group also sponsors outreach programs on college campuses. Her activities have included sponsoring legislation, and more recently heading a task force directed toward developing an Internet-based counterpart to the existing hotline.

Molinari also is chair of The Century Council, a not-for-profit organization dedicated to fighting drunk driving and underage drinking by advocating and facilitating education, communications, research, law enforcement, and other programs. In its fight against these types of alcohol abuse, the Council is funded by "America's leading distillers" of alcoholic liquor, including Bacardi, Inc. and several other liquor manufacturers.

=== Political activities ===
Although she has maintained a public face, Molinari's subsequent political activities have been largely behind the scenes. She supported George W. Bush's election in 2000, but joined with more moderate members of her party such as Gerald Ford, David Rockefeller, and Richard Riordan in forming the Republican Unity Coalition, which opposed Bush's decision to support an amendment to the U.S. Constitution banning gay marriage.

Molinari did not seek elected office in 2006, bucking speculation that she would run against Democratic Senator Hillary Clinton. She was an adviser to former New York City Mayor Rudy Giuliani's (R) 2008 presidential campaign. There was early speculation she might consider running for mayor of New York City in 2009, but she never did. In January 2010, Molinari confirmed that she was seriously considering a Senate bid against U.S. Senator Kirsten Gillibrand, before issuing a public statement three days later saying that she had decided not to run.

In 2013 Molinari was a signatory to an amicus curiae brief submitted to the Supreme Court in support of same-sex marriage during the Hollingsworth v. Perry case.

In 2020, it was announced that she would speak at the 2020 Democratic National Convention in support of Democratic presidential nominee Joe Biden, becoming one of two one-time U.S. political party convention keynote speakers, along with Zell Miller, to speak at a convention for the opposite party.

Molinari is also a member of the Atlantic Council's Board of Directors.

== Personal life ==
Molinari married fellow Republican New York Representative Bill Paxon on July 3, 1994, after having previously been married to John Lucchesi. She and Paxon have two daughters, and have resided in Alexandria, Virginia since 2006.

== See also ==
- Women in the United States House of Representatives

Political offices
Preceded by Jack Muratori	Minority Leader of the New York City Council; 1986–1990	Succeeded by Fred Cerullo
U.S. House of Representatives
Preceded by Guy Molinari	Member of the U.S. House of Representatives from New York's 14th congressional district 1990–1993	Succeeded by Carolyn Maloney
Preceded by Stephen Solarz	Member of the U.S. House of Representatives from New York's 13th congressional district 1993–1997	Succeeded by Vito Fossella
Honorary titles
Preceded by John Rowland	Baby of the House; 1990–1991	Succeeded by Jim Nussle
Party political offices
Preceded by Bill McCollum	Vice Chair of the House Republican Conference; 1995–1997	Succeeded by Jennifer Dunn
Preceded by Phil Gramm	Keynote Speaker of the Republican National Convention; 1996	Succeeded by John McCain; Colin Powell
Media offices
New title	Co-Host of CBS Saturday Morning; 1997–1998; Served alongside: Russ Mitchell	Succeeded by Dawn Stensland
U.S. order of precedence (ceremonial)
Preceded by Jennifer Wexton as Former U.S. Representative	Order of precedence of the United States as Former U.S. Representative	Succeeded by Michael Forbes as Former U.S. Representative
