= Edward V. Curry =

American politician

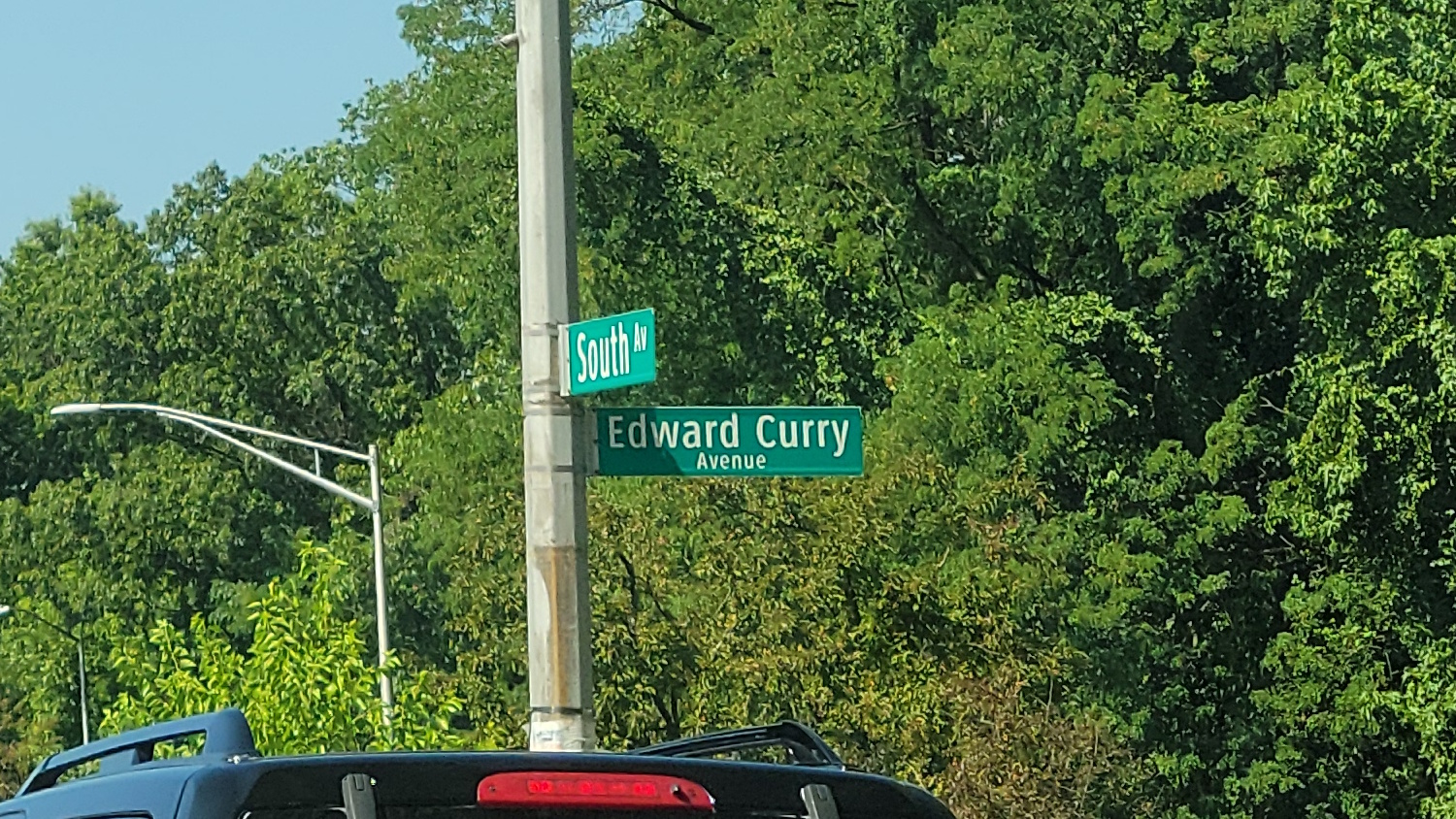
- Edward Curry Avenue near the Teleport in Staten Island.

Member of the New York City Council from the Staten Island at-large district
- In office 1974–1977
- Preceded by: Anthony Gaeta
- Succeeded by: Mary T. Codd

Member of the New York City Council from the 27th district
- In office 1966–1974
- Preceded by: David Ross
- Succeeded by: Luis A. Olmedo

Member of the New York City Council from the 19th district
- In office 1958–1966
- Preceded by: James J. Boland
- Succeeded by: Dominick Corso

Member of the New York State Senate from the 19th district
- In office 1955–1956
- Preceded by: Francis J. Mahoney
- Succeeded by: John J. Marchi

Member of the New York State Assembly from the Richmond County 2nd district
- In office 1949–1952
- Preceded by: Edmund P. Radigan
- Succeeded by: Lucio F. Russo

Personal details
- Born: Edward Vincent Curry; June 18, 1909 New York City, U.S.
- Died: March 4, 1982 (aged 72) New York City, U.S.
- Party: Democratic
- Profession: Politician

Military service
- Allegiance: United States
- Branch/service: United States Navy
- Battles/wars: World War II

Edward Vincent Curry (June 18, 1909 – March 4, 1982) was an American politician from New York.

== Life ==
Curry was born on June 18, 1909, in New York City. He served in the U.S. Navy during World War II. He lived in New Dorp, Staten Island, and entered politics as a Democrat.

He was a member of the New York State Assembly (Richmond Co., 2nd D.) from 1949 to 1952, sitting in the 167th and 168th New York State Legislatures. His 1948 campaign for the State Assembly made the establishment of a free college for Staten Island his primary objective. Curry's victory improved higher education on Staten Island.

He was a member of the New York State Senate (19th D.) in 1955 and 1956. In November 1956, he ran for re-election but was defeated by Republican John J. Marchi.

Curry was a member of the New York City Council from 1958 to 1978.

He died on March 4, 1982 in New Dorp, Staten Island.

In 1984, Edward Curry Avenue in Bloomfield, Staten Island was named in his honor.

New York State Assembly
Preceded by Edmund P. Radigan	Member of the New York State Assembly from the Richmond County 2nd district 1949–1952	Succeeded by Lucio F. Russo
New York State Senate
Preceded by Francis J. Mahoney	Member of the New York State Senate from the 19th district 1955–1956	Succeeded by John J. Marchi
New York City Council
Preceded by James J. Boland	Member of the New York City Council from the 19th district 1958–1966	Succeeded by Dominick Corso
Preceded by David Ross	Member of the New York City Council from the 27th district 1966–1974	Succeeded by Luis A. Olmedo
Preceded by Anthony Gaeta	Member of the New York City Council from the Staten Island at-large district 1974–1977	Succeeded by Mary T. Codd
