= Robert T. Connor =

American politician (1919–2009)

10th Borough President of Staten Island
- In office January 1, 1966 – June 10, 1977
- Preceded by: Albert V. Maniscalco
- Succeeded by: Anthony Gaeta

Personal details
- Born: January 4, 1919 Washington, D.C., U.S.
- Died: January 6, 2009 (aged 90) Fort Belvoir, Virginia, U.S.
- Party: Republican
- Education: Boston College, U.S. Naval Academy

Robert T. Connor (January 4, 1919 – January 6, 2009) was an American politician in New York City. He served as Staten Island Borough President.

== Early life ==
Connor was born on January 4, 1919, in Washington, D.C., where his father served as a naval officer during World War I.

Connor attended Boston College and the U.S. Naval Academy, where he was a graduate of the class of 1942. He was commissioned as an ensign in the U.S. Navy in November 1940. He served on active duty throughout World War II, seeing action in both the Pacific and the Atlantic theaters.

After the war, Connor entered the Central Intelligence Agency as an operations officer and was stationed at headquarters in Washington and abroad. After leaving the CIA, he was associated with the maritime industry at New York Harbor and other North Atlantic ports.

== Political career ==
In 1962, Connor ran as a Republican for the congressional seat representing Staten Island and part of Brooklyn. However, he lost to the Democrat, John M. Murphy.

However, Connor was elected the following year as a Councilman-at-Large to the City Council representing Staten Island.

In 1965, Connor was elected as Staten Island Borough President as a Republican. He was subsequently re-elected in 1969 as the nominee of the Republican and Conservative parties and again in 1973 as the candidate of the Democratic and Conservative parties. In his role as Borough President, he served as a member of the New York City Board of Estimate, which was responsible for budget and land-use decisions. He did not seek re-election in 1977 and resigned on June 10, 1977. He was the longest serving elected official in that position.

Connor was appointed by Governors Nelson Rockefeller and Hugh Carey as Commander of the New York Naval Militia with the rank of Rear Admiral NYNM. He annually performed two or more weeks of active duty on Navy ships or aircraft in the United States and abroad as he was a designated naval aviator as well as being qualified for command at sea.

== Later life ==
In 1977, President Jimmy Carter appointed Connor as deputy assistant secretary of the Navy. He continued to serve into President Reagan's first term.

After leaving the Navy Department, Connor performed consulting services for various maritime interests, including the Port Authority of New York and New Jersey and Barber Steamship Lines in Annapolis, Maryland, where he was also a director of the Navy Sailing Association and a volunteer coach of the Naval Academy Sailing Squadron.

During his retirement, Connor resided at Sunrise Senior Living, a housing complex in Fort Belvoir, Virginia. His interests included tennis, sailing, writing and travel.

== Death ==
Connor died on January 6, 2009, in Fort Belvoir, Virginia, two days after his 90th birthday.

Political offices
Preceded by Albert V. Maniscalo	Borough President of Staten Island; 1966–1977	Succeeded by Anthony Gaeta
