= David Ross (politician) =

South African politician

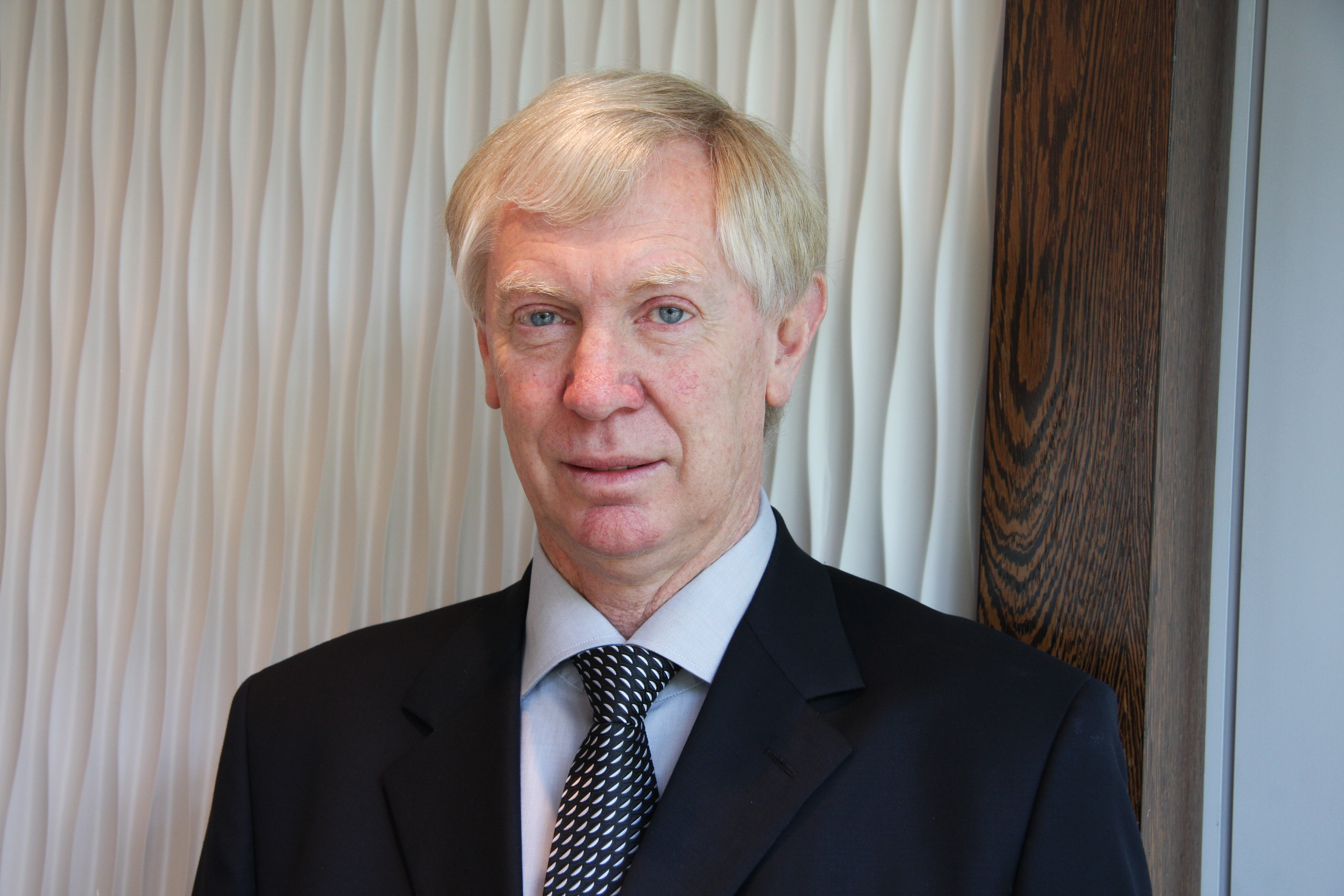
- Ross in 2009

Member of the National Assembly of South Africa
- In office 1 December 2009 – 7 May 2019
- Preceded by: Cobus Schmidt

Personal details
- Born: David Christie Ross; 11 November 1949 (age 76)
- Party: Democratic Alliance
- Occupation: Politician

David Christie Ross (born 11 November 1949) is a South African politician currently serving as a councillor for the Democratic Alliance in the Nala Local Municipality. He previously served as a member of the National Assembly from 2009 until 2019.

== Parliamentary career ==
Ross entered the National Assembly on 1 December 2009; he filled the casual vacancy that arose when Cobus Schmidt died. Ross was appointed to the Shadow Cabinet as Shadow Deputy Minister of Energy as part of a major reshuffle done by DA parliamentary leader Athol Trollip in September 2010. in February 2012, Ross was appointed to the role of Shadow Deputy Minister of Finance by newly elected parliamentary leader Lindiwe Mazibuko.

After Ross was re-elected for a full term as a Member of Parliament in the 2014 general election, he remained as Shadow Deputy Minister of Finance. The following year, DA leader Mmusi Maimane reshuffled his cabinet which saw Ross become a DA representative on the Standing Committee on Public Accounts.

In October 2015, Ross wrote SCOPA chairperson Themba Godi requesting that the Chairperson of the Portfolio Committee on Transport Dikeledi Magadzi appear before the committee for postponing hearings into the Passenger Rail Agency of South Africa's financial misconduct.

Ross unsuccessfully stood for re-election to the National Assembly in 2019, having been ranked low on the DA's candidate lists. Ross was then sworn in as a DA councillor in the Nala Local Municipality. He was elected a full term in council in 2021. By 2023, he was serving as the chairperson of the municipality's Finance Committee.
