= Swinburne Island =

Island in Lower New York Bay, United States

Coordinates: 40°33′56″N 74°03′01″W

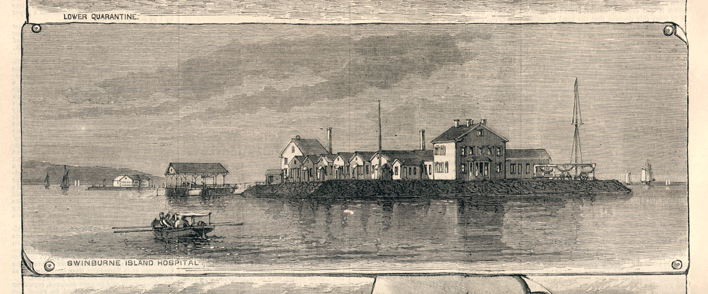
Swinburne Island hospital, 1879

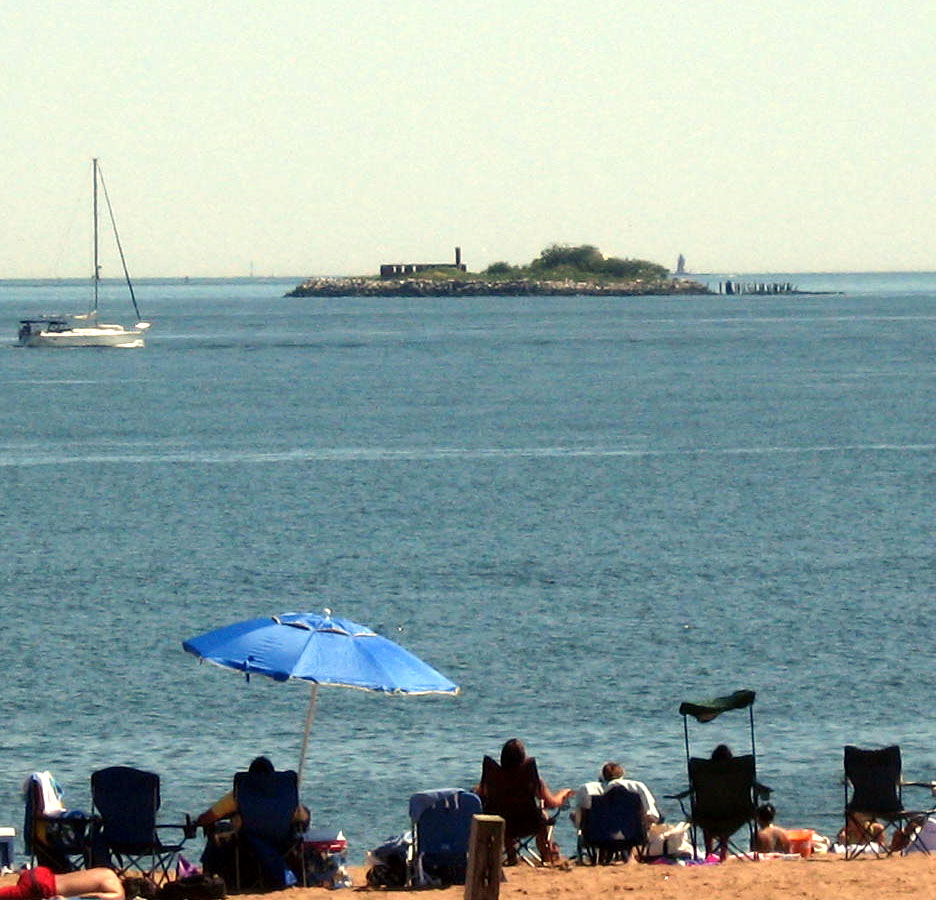
From South Beach boardwalk, 2008

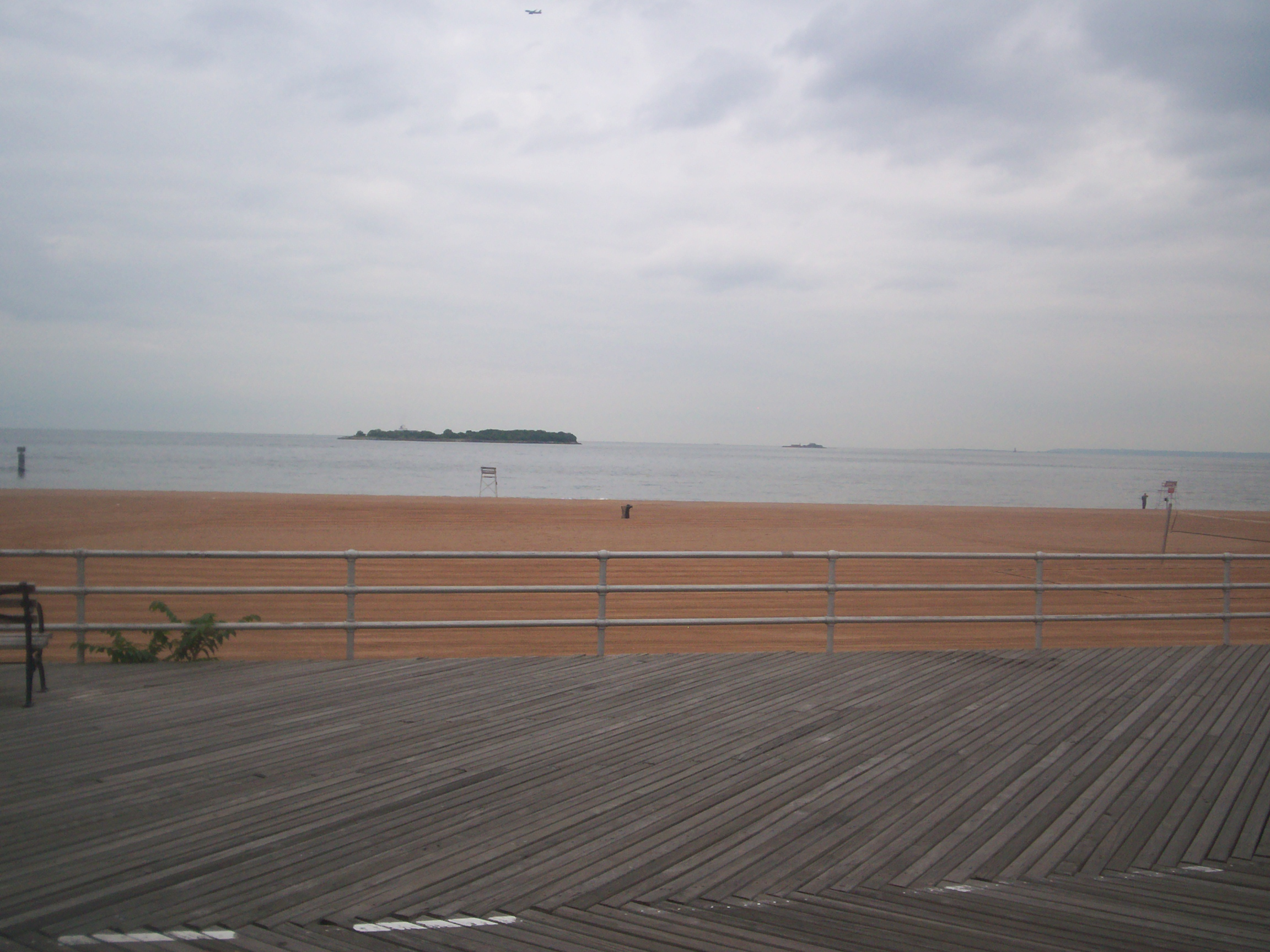
Hoffman (left) and Swinburne (right) Islands, seen from South Beach, Staten Island

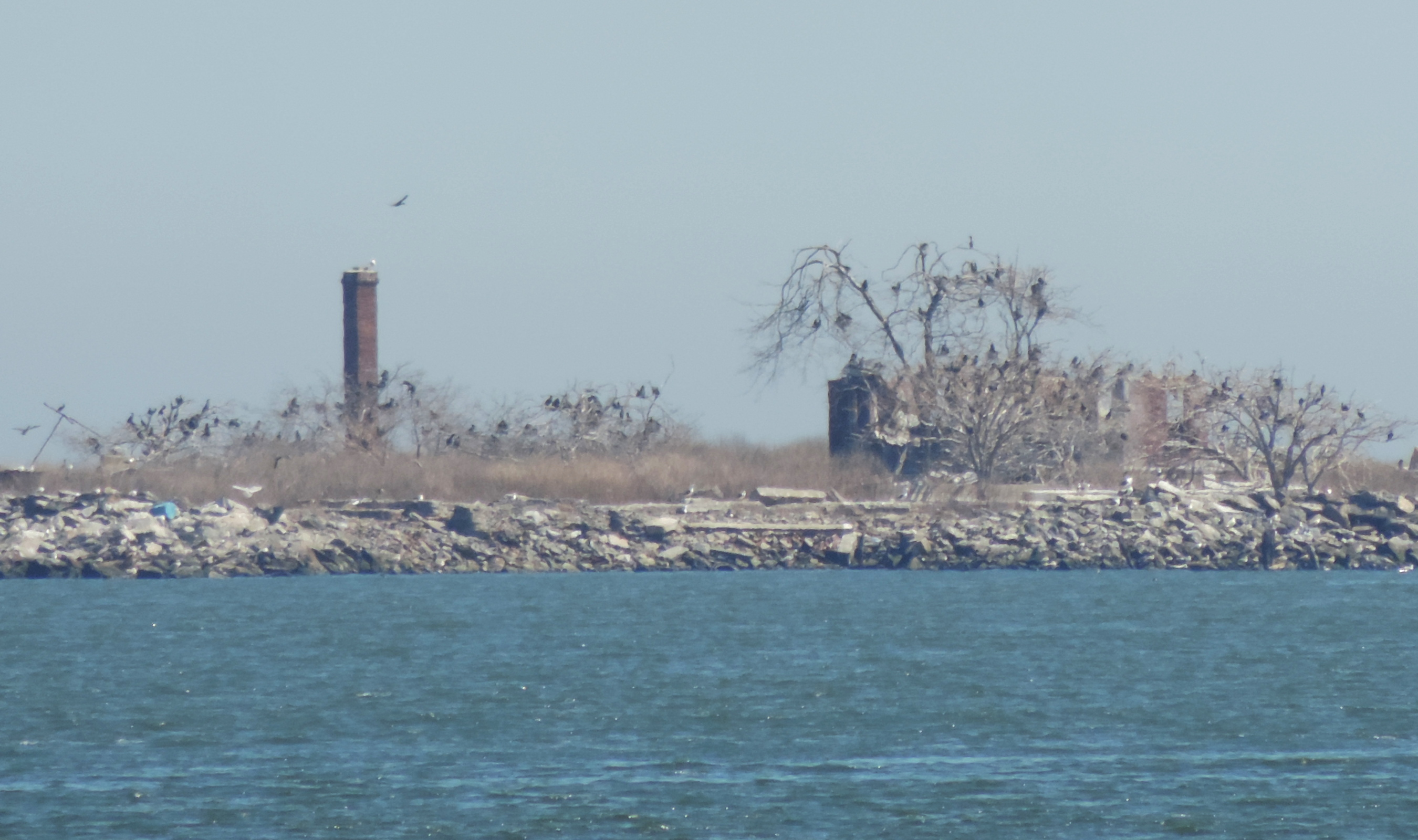
Surviving buildings, seen from the west

Swinburne Island is a 4-acre (1.6 ha) artificial island in Lower New York Bay, east of Staten Island in New York City. It was used for quarantine of immigrants. Swinburne Island is the smaller of two nearby islands, the other being Hoffman Island to the north.

== History ==
Starting in 1860 sand would be dredged from New York Harbor and dumped in two mounds, the 11-acre Hoffman Island and the 2-and-a-half-acre Dix Island, also known as Upper and Lower Quarantine Islands respectively. Dix Island was named for John Dix, a US Senator and later governor of New York State. In 1869 the island was renamed Swinburne Island after John Swinburne, a Civil War physician and later United States Representative, who led the island's development in 1870 into a quarantine facility for steerage passengers from the West Indies, South America and the African west coast, regions known for infectious diseases.

Ships would initially dock at one of the two islands, its passengers inspected, and those showing symptoms of contagious diseases would be hospitalized on Swinburne Island, while those that where asymptomatic would be detained on Hoffman Island. In the 1880s, the lower harbor would be overcrowded with ships pending quarantine at the islands due to a series of large cholera outbreaks that decade.

Swinburne was used through the early 20th century to quarantine immigrants to the United States who were found to be suffering from dangerous contagious diseases upon arrival at the Port of New York. Immigrants suspected of having such diseases were taken to the quarantine hospital and were not allowed to go to Ellis Island for entry until they were shown to be well or were cured of the disease. Originally, Hoffman was used to house patients who only had exposure to "pestilential" diseases, while Swinburne housed those with confirmed cases. Swinburne Island was used to quarantine patients during the last cholera outbreak in the United States in 1910–1911, which started with a passenger from Naples on the SS Moltke, a ship of the Hamburg-American Line.

There was less immigration to the United States during World War I. A few years after the end of the war, the Immigration Act of 1924 sharply reduced immigration from Southern and Eastern Europe. By this time, the city and state had learned other means of controlling infectious diseases, so the quarantine facilities found little use. By the start of World War II, the United States Merchant Marine had adapted both islands for use as a training station, opened in 1938.

In the mid-1960s, Robert Moses considered turning the two islands into a city park, but the plan never came to fruition. Ownership of the island was deeded from the city to the National Park Service in 1972, with a formal takeover in 1974.

== Current use ==
Both Hoffman Island (11 acres) and Swinburne Island (4 acres) are now managed by the National Park Service as part of the Staten Island Unit of Gateway National Recreation Area.

Hoffman Island features the remains of deserted docks, and its interior is densely overgrown, revealing only the foundations of demolished structures. Swinburne Island has five substantial dilapidated buildings. Among these ruins stands a brick chimney, likely associated with the former crematorium.

They are not open to the public, and as The New York Times reported, "Paradoxically, then, though the islands belong to the Gateway National Recreation Area, the only recreation permitted is practiced by visitors of the feathered and aquatic persuasions." In the 2000s, Swinburne Island became a popular haul out site for Lower New York Harbor's population of harbor seals and grey seals. The populations of both species have been increasing every year. There are nesting sites for five species of long-legged wading birds.
