= Albert V. Maniscalco =

American politician

Borough president of Staten Island
- In office January 1, 1955 – January 1, 1966
- Preceded by: Edward G. Baker
- Succeeded by: Robert T. Connor

Personal details
- Born: 1908 Manhattan, New York, U.S.
- Died: September 2, 1998 (aged 90) Staten Island, New York, U.S.
- Party: Democratic
- Education: St. John's University

Albert V. Maniscalco (1908 – September 2, 1998) was an American politician from New York. He served as borough president of Staten Island from 1955 to 1965.

== Early life ==
Maniscalco was born in Manhattan in 1908. His family moved to Staten Island when he was nine years old. He dropped out of high school and cleaned engines for the Baltimore and Ohio Railroad before earning his bachelor's degree and law degree from St. John's University.

== Political career ==
Maniscalco cofounded the South Beach Democratic Club at age 15. He ran for New York State Assembly in 1934. but lost to Herman Methfessel. He was elected in 1938 and re-elected in 1940, but then lost his next re-election to Robert Molinari. In 1950, Borough President Cornelius A. Hall appointed Maniscalco borough secretary, and he stayed in the position when Edward G. Baker succeeded Hall as borough president.

Maniscalco was elected to the New York City Council in 1953. When Baker resigned from his role as borough president to assume a position on the New York State Supreme Court, the city council's members from Staten Island selected Maniscalco to serve as interim borough president. He was sworn in on January 1, 1955. In November 1955, Maniscalco won the election to serve out the remainder of Baker's term.

Maniscalco was elected to his own four-year term in November 1957 and was re-elected in November 1961. He lost re-election in November 1965 to Robert T. Connor.

== Personal life ==
Maniscalco and his wife, Grace (née Fiorelli), had two children. Maniscalco died in Staten Island on September 2, 1998.

== See also ==
- List of borough presidents of New York City
