= Angelo J. Arculeo =

American lawyer and politician (1924–2013)

Angelo J. Arculeo (18 February 1924 – 9 March 2013) was an Italian American accountant, lawyer, and Republican Party politician from New York City who represented parts of southern Brooklyn in the New York City Council from 1962 to 1982. He served as Minority Leader of that body twice, from 1962 to 1970, and from 1973 to 1982. During the period between his two terms as Minority Leader, he continued to serve as Republican Party Leader.

A 1954 graduate of St. John's University School of Law,

Arculeo is interred at St. John Cemetery, Queens, New York.

Political offices
Preceded by George H. Hearn	New York City Council, 14th district 1962–1965	Succeeded by Edward L. Sadowsky
Preceded by Robert A. Low	New York City Council, 22nd district 1966–1973	Succeeded by Arthur J. Katzman
Preceded by New District	New York City Council, 31st district 1974–1982	Succeeded by Sal Albanese
Preceded by Stanley M. Isaacs	Minority Leader, New York City Council; 1962–1970	Succeeded by Eldon R. Clingan
Preceded by Eldon R. Clingan	Minority Leader, New York City Council; 1973–1982	Succeeded by Jack Muratori
