= John M. Murphy (New York politician) =

American politician (1926–2015)

John Murphy
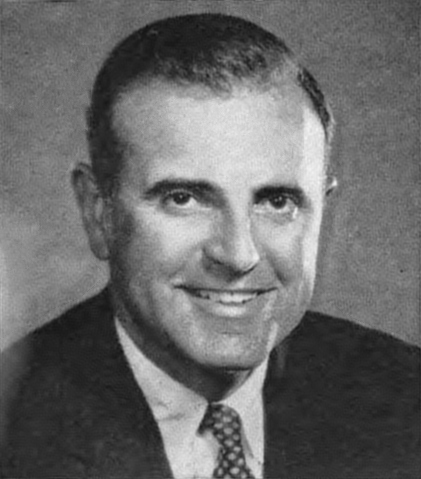

Member of the U.S. House of Representatives from New York
- In office January 3, 1963 – January 3, 1981
- Preceded by: John H. Ray (redistricting)
- Succeeded by: Guy Molinari
- Constituency: 16th district (1963–1973); 17th district (1973–1981)

Personal details
- Born: John Michael Murphy; August 3, 1926 New York City, New York, U.S.
- Died: May 25, 2015 (aged 88) New York City, New York, U.S.
- Party: Democratic
- Spouse: Kathleen Murphy
- Children: 2
- Education: Amherst College; United States Military Academy (BS)

John Michael Murphy (August 3, 1926 – May 25, 2015) was a Democratic member of the U.S. House of Representatives from New York's 16th (1963–1973) and 17th (1973–1981) districts. He was convicted of taking bribes in the 1980 Abscam scandal. He is the last Democrat to represent Staten Island in the House of Representatives for more than one term.

== Life and career ==
Murphy was born in Staten Island, New York City, New York, the son of Florence and Frank Murphy. He attended La Salle Military Academy, Amherst College, and the United States Military Academy at West Point.

=== Military service ===
He served in the U.S. Army from August 1944 to July 1956, first as an enlisted man before receiving his commission after four years at West Point. During his military service he received the Distinguished Service Cross and the Bronze Star, and was discharged as a captain.

=== Congress ===
He was elected as a Democrat to the 88th U.S. Congress and to the eight succeeding Congresses (January 3, 1963 – January 3, 1981). After being indicted in the Abscam bribery scandal, he ran unsuccessfully for re-election in 1980. Murphy was acquitted of bribery, but found guilty on lesser charges, and served 18 months in prison.

During his time in Congress he chaired committees dealing with maritime and oceanic matters. He was a life long friend of Anastasio Somoza since their days as students at West Point; while in office, Murphy opposed the Carter administrations efforts to remove Somoza.

=== Family ===
His son, Mark Murphy, is a real-estate developer who worked as an aide to Bill de Blasio during his tenure as New York City Public Advocate. On January 19, 2012, Mark Murphy announced he would seek election to the Congressional seat his father once held. On November 6, Murphy lost the election to incumbent Republican Michael Grimm, 46.2% – 52.8%.

=== Death ===
Murphy died the age of 88 on May 25, 2015, at Richmond University Medical Center in Staten Island, NY of complications from a heart attack.

== See also ==
- List of American federal politicians convicted of crimes
- List of federal political scandals in the United States

U.S. House of Representatives
Preceded by Adam Clayton Powell Jr.	Member of the U.S. House of Representatives from New York's 16th congressional district 1963–1973	Succeeded by Elizabeth Holtzman
Preceded by Ed Koch	Member of the U.S. House of Representatives from New York's 17th congressional district 1973–1981	Succeeded by Guy Molinari
Preceded by Leonor Sullivan	Member of the House Merchant Marine Committee; 1977–1980	Succeeded by Thomas L. Ashley
