= New York City's 51st City Council district =

- Boundaries following the 2020 census

Government
  - Councilmember: Frank Morano (R—Eltingville)

Population (2010)
  - Total: 157,906

Demographics
  - White: 84%
  - Hispanic: 9%
  - Asian: 5%
  - Black: 1%
  - Other: 1%

Registration
  - Republican: 41.9%
  - Democratic: 30.3%
  - No party preference: 22.5%
- Registered voters (2021) 121,993

New York City's 51st City Council district is one of 51 districts in the New York City Council. It has been represented by Republican Frank Morano since 2025, succeeding fellow Republican Joe Borelli.

The district holds a number of distinctions. It is by far the most Republican-leaning Council district in the city, it is the only Council district to have more registered Republicans than Democrats, it is the largest Council district by area, and, at 84% white, it is the city's whitest and most politically conservative Council district.

== Geography ==
District 51 covers the South Shore of Staten Island, including the neighborhoods of Great Kills, Tottenville, Annadale, Huguenot, Rossville, Pleasant Plains, Eltingville, Bay Terrace, Charleston, Prince's Bay, Richmond Valley, Woodrow, Arden Heights, Greenridge, and parts of Heartland Village and New Springville.

The district includes a large number of parks, among them Great Kills Park, Blue Heron Park, Wolfe's Pond Park, Long Pond Park, Conference House Park, Bloomingdale Park, Clay Pit Ponds State Park Preserve, and the southern parts of Freshkills Park and the Staten Island Greenbelt.

The district overlaps with Staten Island Community Boards 2 and 3, and is contained entirely within New York's 11th congressional district. It also overlaps with the 24th district of the New York State Senate, and with the 62nd, 63rd, and 64th districts of the New York State Assembly.

== Members representing the district ==
Members	Party	Years served	Electoral history
District established January 1, 1992
Alfred Cerullo (Great Kills)	Republican	January 1, 1992 – February 28, 1994	Redistricted from the 1st district and seated in 1992. Re-elected in 1993. Resigned to become Commissioner on Consumer Affairs.
Vacant		February 28, 1994 – April 27, 1994	
Vito Fossella (Great Kills)	Republican	April 27, 1994 – November 4, 1997	Elected to finish Cerullo's term. Re-elected in 1994. Retired when elected to the U.S. House of Representatives.
Vacant		November 4, 1997 – January 1, 1998	
Stephen Fiala (Eltingville)	Republican	January 1, 1998 – December 31, 2001	Elected in 1997. Retired.
Andrew Lanza (Great Kills)	Republican	January 1, 2002 – December 31, 2006	Elected in 2001. Re-elected in 2003. Re-elected in 2005. Resigned when elected to the New York State Senate.
Vacant		December 31, 2006 – February 20, 2007	
Vincent M. Ignizio (Annadale)	Republican	February 20, 2007 – July 10, 2015	Elected to finish Lanza's term. Re-elected in 2007. Re-elected in 2009. Re-elected in 2013. Resigned.
Vacant		July 10, 2015 – November 30, 2015	
Joe Borelli (Annadale)	Republican	November 30, 2015 – January 31, 2025	Elected to finish Ignizio's term. Re-elected in 2017. Re-elected in 2021. Re-elected in 2023. Resigned.
Vacant		February 1, 2025 – May 13, 2025	
Frank Morano (Eltingville)	Republican	May 13, 2025 – present	Elected to finish Borelli's term. Re-elected in 2025.

== Recent election results ==
=== 2025 general ===
The 2025 New York City Council elections will be held on November 4, 2025, with primary elections occurring on June 24, 2025.

2025 New York City Council election, District 51
Primary election
Party	Candidate	Votes	%
Republican	Frank Morano (incumbent)	3,317	81.9
Republican	Griffin Fossella (withdrawn)	377	9.3
Republican	John Buthorn	330	8.2
Write-in		24	0.6
Total votes		4,048	100.0
General election
Republican	Frank Morano	42,624	
Conservative	Frank Morano	2,840	
Total	Frank Morano (incumbent)	45,654	77.0
Democratic	Clifford Hagen	12,374	21.0
Patriot Workers	John Buthorn	1,039	1.8
Write-in		101	0.2
Total votes		58,978	100.0
Republican hold			

=== 2025 special ===
Following Joe Borelli's resignation, a special election was triggered for this seat. Like all municipal special elections in New York City, the race is officially nonpartisan, with all candidates running on ballot lines of their own creation. Following Ballot Question 1's approval in 2019, special elections will also utilize ranked-choice voting.

2025 New York City Council 51st district special election
Party	Candidate	Votes	%
SI Patriotism	Frank Morano	5,649	58.9
Common Ground	Clifford Hagen	2,011	21.0
We The People	Griffin Fossella	1,897	19.8
Write-in		33	0.3
Total votes		9,590	100.0

=== 2023 (redistricting) ===
Due to redistricting and the 2020 changes to the New York City Charter, councilmembers elected during the 2021 and 2023 City Council elections will serve two-year terms, with full four-year terms resuming after the 2025 New York City Council elections.

2023 New York City Council election, District 51
Party	Candidate	Votes	%
Republican	Joe Borelli	8,519	
Conservative	Joe Borelli	1,589	
Total	Joe Borelli (incumbent)	10,108	96.7
Write-in		342	3.3
Total votes		10,450	100.0
Republican hold			

=== 2021 ===
An interactive map of District 51

In 2019, voters in New York City approved Ballot Question 1, which implemented ranked-choice voting in all local primary and special elections. Under the new system, voters have the option to rank up to five candidates for every local office. Voters whose first-choice candidates fare poorly will have their votes redistributed to other candidates in their ranking until one candidate surpasses the 50 percent threshold. If one candidate surpasses 50 percent in first-choice votes, then ranked-choice tabulations will not occur.

2021 New York City Council election, District 51
Party	Candidate	Votes	%
Republican	Joe Borelli	31,621	
Conservative	Joe Borelli	2,630	
Total	Joe Borelli (incumbent)	34,251	83.7
Democratic	Olivia Drabczyk	6,628	16.2
Write-in		24	0.1
Total votes		40,903	100
Republican hold			

=== 2017 ===
2017 New York City Council election, District 51
Party	Candidate	Votes	%
Republican	Joe Borelli	25,184	
Conservative	Joe Borelli	3,690	
Independence	Joe Borelli	498	
Reform	Joe Borelli	154	
Total	Joe Borelli (incumbent)	29,526	80.1
Democratic	Dylan Schwartz	6,692	
Working Families	Dylan Schwartz	579	
Total	Dylan Schwartz	7,271	19.7
Write-in		77	0.2
Total votes		36,874	100
Republican hold			

=== 2016 special ===
The November special election also coincided with federal elections in 2016, including the presidential election, Senate election and other statewide races.

2016 New York City Council special election, District 51
Party	Candidate	Votes	%
Republican	Joe Borelli	45,158	
Conservative	Joe Borelli	4,644	
Independence	Joe Borelli	3,550	
Total	Joe Borelli (incumbent)	53,352	99.3
Write-in		376	0.7
Total votes		53,728	100
Republican hold			

=== 2015 special ===
In 2015, Councilman Vincent Ignizio resigned his seat to take a job in the nonprofit sector, leaving his seat vacant. Two special elections were called to fill his seat: one nonpartisan primary to fill the seat until December 31, 2016, followed by a standard partisan primary and general election to take place in 2016 to complete the remainder of his term. Like most municipal special elections in New York City, the election was officially nonpartisan, with candidates running on ballot lines of their own creation.

2015 New York City Council special election, District 51
Party	Candidate	Votes	%
South Shore First	Joe Borelli	9,111	97.9
Write-in		198	2.1
Total votes		9,309	100

=== 2013 ===
2013 New York City Council election, District 51
Party	Candidate	Votes	%
Republican	Vincent Ignizio	15,157	
Conservative	Vincent Ignizio	2,434	
Independence	Vincent Ignizio	734	
Total	Vincent Ignizio (incumbent)	18,325	73.6
Democratic	Chris Walsh	6,540	26.3
Write-in		25	0.1
Total votes		24,890	100
Republican hold			
