= New York's 61st State Assembly district =

American legislative district

Assemblymember
Charles Fall; D–Mariners Harbor

New York's 61st State Assembly district is one of 150 districts of the New York State Assembly. As of 2019 it is represented by Assemblymember Charles Fall (D).

== Geography ==
Prior to 2021, the district included neighborhoods in Staten Island's North Shore.

Following redistricting in 2021, the district expanded to include the North Shore, as well as Manhattan's Financial District, Battery Park City and the shoreline of Brooklyn between Brooklyn Heights and Bay Ridge. The district includes Governors Island, Ellis Island, Liberty Island, the World Trade Center complex, the 9/11 Memorial, Sailors' Snug Harbor and the Staten Island Zoo.

The district overlaps (partially) with New York's 10th and 11th congressional districts, the 23rd, 24th, 26th and 27th districts of the New York State Senate, and the 1st, 49th and 50th districts of the New York City Council.

== Recent election results ==
=== 2026 ===
2026 New York State Assembly election, District 61
Party	Candidate	Votes	%
Democratic	Charles Fall (incumbent)		
Republican	Casey O'Connor-Manasia		
Write-in			
Total votes			100.0

=== 2024 ===
2024 New York State Assembly election, District 61
Party	Candidate	Votes	%
Democratic	Charles Fall (incumbent)	31,984	97.8
Write-in		704	2.2
Total votes		32,688	100.0
Democratic hold			

=== 2022 ===
2022 New York State Assembly election, District 61
Primary election
Party	Candidate	Votes	%
Democratic	Charles Fall (incumbent)	4,515	70.2
Democratic	Justine Cuccia	1,894	29.4
Write-in		26	0.4
Total votes		6,435	100.0
General election
Democratic	Charles Fall (incumbent)	21,192	97.9
Write-in		457	0.5
Total votes		21,649	100.0
Democratic hold			

=== 2020 ===
2020 New York State Assembly election, District 61
Party	Candidate	Votes	%
Democratic	Charles Fall	32,185	
Independence	Charles Fall	720	
Total	Charles Fall (incumbent)	32,905	68.8
Republican	Paul Ciurcina Jr.	13,015	
Conservative	Paul Ciurcina Jr.	1,855	
Total	Paul Ciurcina Jr.	14,870	31.1
Write-in		55	0.1
Total votes		47,830	100.0
Democratic hold			

=== 2018 ===
2018 New York State Assembly election, District 61
Primary election
Party	Candidate	Votes	%
Democratic	Charles Fall	4,810	43.2
Democratic	Patricia Kane	3,224	28.9
Democratic	Bobby Digi Olisa	3,096	27.8
Write-in		12	0.1
Total votes		11,142	100.0
General election
Democratic	Charles Fall	24,561	
Reform	Charles Fall	425	
Total	Charles Fall	24,986	84.0
Working Families	Patricia Kane	2,956	9.9
Green	Daniel Falcone	1,672	5.6
Write-in		130	0.5
Total votes		29,744	100.0
Democratic hold			

=== 2016 ===
2016 New York State Assembly election, District 61
Party	Candidate	Votes	%
Democratic	Matthew Titone (incumbent)	31,750	99.2
Write-in		245	0.8
Total votes		31,995	100.0
Democratic hold			

=== 2014 ===
2014 New York State Assembly election, District 61
Party	Candidate	Votes	%
Democratic	Matthew Titone	13,633	
Independence	Matthew Titone	1,408	
Working Families	Matthew Titone	1,388	
Total	Matthew Titone (incumbent)	16,429	98.9
Write-in		190	1.1
Total votes		16,619	100.0
Democratic hold			

=== 2012 ===
2012 New York State Assembly election, District 61
Primary election
Party	Candidate	Votes	%
Independence	Matthew Titone	50	43.2
Independence	Paul Saryian	35	28.9
Write-in		0	0.0
Total votes		85	100.0
General election
Democratic	Matthew Titone	26,541	
Working Families	Matthew Titone	1,340	
Independence	Matthew Titone	735	
Total	Matthew Titone (incumbent)	28,616	79.8
Republican	Paul Saryian	7,204	20.1
Write-in		33	0.1
Total votes		35,853	100.0
Democratic hold			

=== 2010 ===
2010 New York State Assembly election, District 61
Party	Candidate	Votes	%
Democratic	Matthew Titone	15,806	
Independence	Matthew Titone	2,723	
Working Families	Matthew Titone	1,352	
Total	Matthew Titone (incumbent)	19,881	92.6
Libertarian	Dave Narby	1,494	7.0
Write-in		89	0.4
Total votes		21,464	100.0
Democratic hold			

=== 2008 ===
2008 New York State Assembly election, District 61
Party	Candidate	Votes	%
Democratic	Matthew Titone	24,698	
Working Families	Matthew Titone	1,276	
Total	Matthew Titone (incumbent)	25,974	73.1
Republican	Thomas McGinley	8,578	24.1
Independence	Rose Margarella	1,196	2.8
Write-in		5	0.0
Total votes		35,542	100.0
Democratic hold			

=== 2007 special ===
Incumbent John Lavelle died on January 24, 2007, triggering a special election. In special elections for state legislative offices, primaries are usually not held – county committee members and district leaders for each party select nominees.

2007 New York State Assembly special election, District 61
Party	Candidate	Votes	%
Democratic	Matthew Titone	2,802	
Working Families	Matthew Titone	286	
Total	Matthew Titone	3,088	49.9
Republican	Rose Margarella	1,460	
Conservative	Rose Margarella	474	
Total	Rose Margarella	1,934	31.2
Independence	Kelvin Alexander	1,160	18.7
Write-in		13	0.2
Total votes		6,195	100.0
Democratic hold			

=== 2006 ===
2006 New York State Assembly election, District 61
Party	Candidate	Votes	%
Democratic	John Lavelle	12,986	
Working Families	John Lavelle	977	
Total	John Lavelle (incumbent)	13,963	72.6
Republican	Rose Margarella	5,249	27.3
Write-in		11	0.1
Total votes		19,223	100.0
Democratic hold			

=== 2004 ===
2004 New York State Assembly election, District 61
Primary election
Party	Candidate	Votes	%
Democratic	John Lavelle (incumbent)	2,679	65.9
Democratic	Charles McLean	1,381	34.0
Write-in		2	0.1
Total votes		4,062	100.0
Independence	Charles McLean	31	64.6
Independence	John Johnson	17	34.4
Write-in		0	0.0
Total votes		48	100.0
General election
Democratic	John Lavelle	20,014	
Working Families	John Lavelle	1,178	
Total	John Lavelle (incumbent)	21,192	65.3
Republican	John Russell	8,563	
Conservative	John Russell	1,138	
Total	John Russell	9,701	29.9
Independence	Charles McLean	1,550	4.8
Write-in		0	0.0
Total votes		32,443	100.0
Democratic hold			

=== 2002 ===
2002 New York State Assembly election, District 61
Party	Candidate	Votes	%
Democratic	John Lavelle	10,773	
Working Families	John Lavelle	593	
Total	John Lavelle (incumbent)	11,366	60.5
Republican	Terry Player	6,211	
Conservative	Terry Player	1,214	
Total	Terry Player	7,245	39.5
Write-in		0	0.0
Total votes		18,791	100.0
Democratic win (new boundaries)			

=== 2000 ===
2000 New York State Assembly election, District 61
Party	Candidate	Votes	%
Republican	Robert Straniere	27,385	
Conservative	Robert Straniere	2,570	
Right to Life	Robert Straniere	995	
Independence	Robert Straniere	739	
Working Families	Robert Straniere	509	
Total	Robert Straniere (incumbent)	32,198	72.7
Democratic	George Hartigan	12,086	27.3
Write-in		0	0.0
Total votes		44,284	100.0
Republican hold			

=== Federal results in Assembly District 61 ===
Year	Office	Results
2024	President	Harris 63.0 - 35.2%
2024	Senate	Gillibrand 66.0 - 32.9%
2022	Senate	Schumer 67.1 - 32.3%
2020	President	Biden 66.2 - 32.6%
2018	Senate	Gillibrand 74.5 - 25.4%
2016	President	Clinton 65.7 - 31.0%
2016	Senate	Schumer 78.6 - 19.4%
2012	President	Obama 73.3 - 25.5%
2012	Senate	Gillibrand 80.8 - 18.1%

== Past Assemblypersons ==
- Charles Fall (2019–present)
- Matthew Titone (2007–2018)
- John W. Lavelle (2003–2007)
- Robert Straniere (1993–2002)
- Deborah Glick (1991–1992)
- William F. Passannante (1983–1990)
- Elizabeth Connelly (1974–1982)
- Edward J. Amann, Jr. (1973–1974)
- Anthony G. DiFalco (1969–1972)
- Jerome W. Marks (1967–1968)
- James H. Tully, Jr. (1966)
