= Andrew Lanza =

American politician (born 1964)

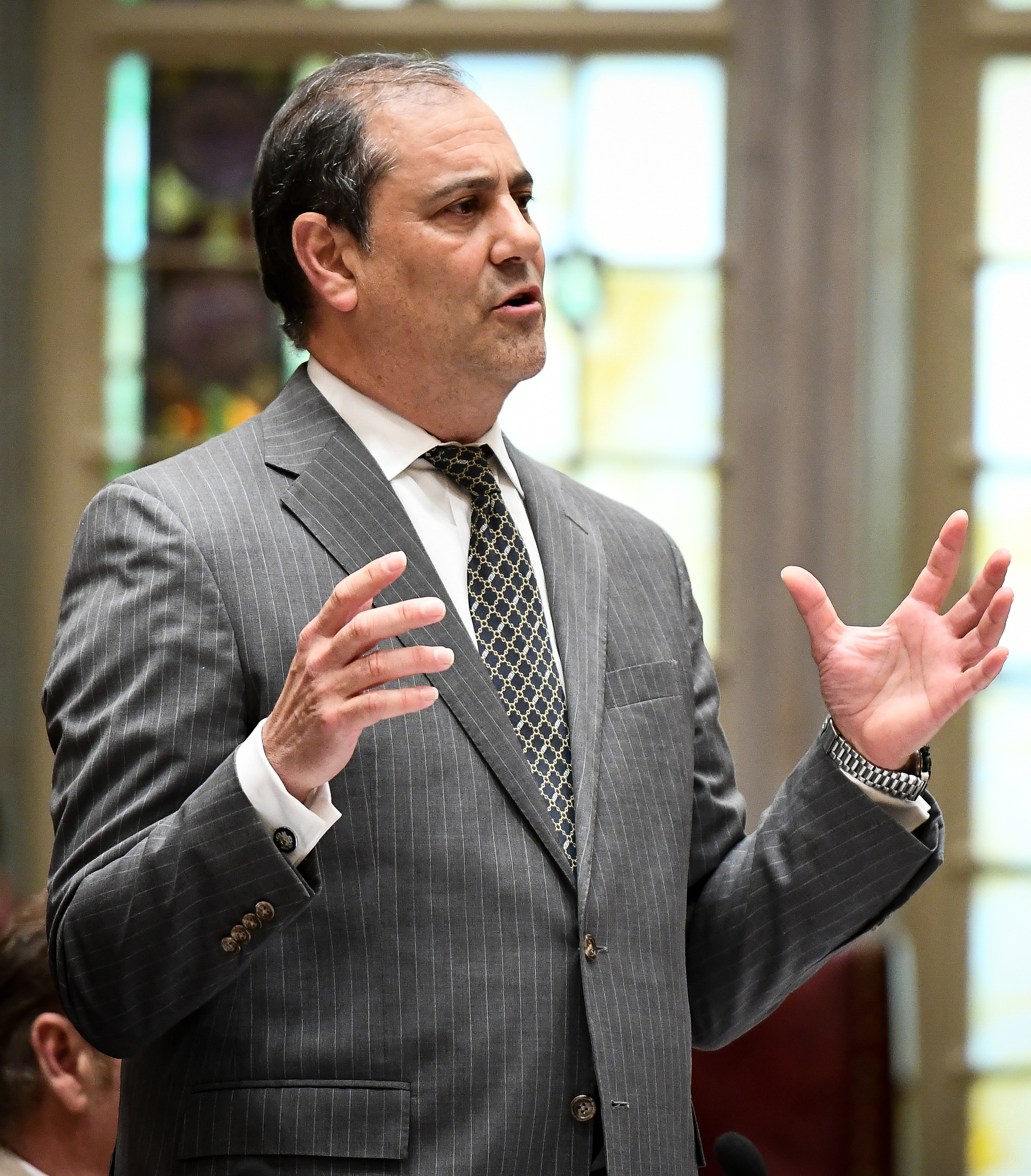

Member of the New York State Senate from the 24th district
- Incumbent
- Assumed office January 1, 2007
- Preceded by: John J. Marchi

Member of the New York City Council from the 51st district
- In office January 1, 2002 – December 31, 2006
- Preceded by: Stephen Fiala
- Succeeded by: Vincent M. Ignizio

Personal details
- Born: Andrew Joseph Lanza; March 12, 1964 (age 62) Brooklyn, New York, U.S.
- Party: Republican
- Spouse: Marcele Lanza
- Education: St. John's University (BS); Fordham University (JD)
- Website: State Senate website

Andrew Joseph Lanza (born March 12, 1964) is an American lawyer and Republican politician. He is a member of the New York State Senate, representing the 24th district, which includes most of Staten Island. He was elected in 2006 after having served on the New York City Council for the 51st district.

== Early life and career ==
Born in Brooklyn, Lanza grew up in Great Kills, Staten Island. He graduated from Monsignor Farrell High School in Oakwood in 1982.

He attended St. John's University, receiving a B.S. in Accounting. He obtained his Juris Doctor degree from Fordham University School of Law. He is admitted to practice law in New York, New Jersey, and United States District Courts for the Southern District of New York and New Jersey.

Before entering politics, Lanza was Managing Member and General Counsel Partner of Mercury Securities LLC, a Wall Street software development and stock trading firm. Previously, he was an Assistant District Attorney in the Manhattan District Attorney's Office and prosecuted street crimes, felony cases, New York State Welfare fraud, and procedural and constitutional issues. Lanza also was a senior auditor with KPMG Peat Marwick, where he audited public and private firms, banks, importers, and hospitals.

Lanza was first elected to the New York City Council as a Republican in 2001. At the time, he was one of three Republicans on the 51-member council. He was re-elected in 2003 and 2005.

Lanza lives in Great Kills with his wife, Marcele, a public middle school administrator, and their three children. He is a childhood friend of former U.S. Congressman Vito Fossella of Staten Island.

== New York State Senate ==
Lanza was elected to the New York State Senate in 2006, replacing Senator John J. Marchi, who retired after holding the seat for 50 years. Since his initial election, he has won by large margins and been unopposed three times.

After Democrats took control of the state senate in the 2018 elections for only the third time since World War II, Lanza was the only Republican representing part of New York City.

=== Judicial independence ===
On June 21, 2007, Lanza and Assemblyman Michael Cusick announced the introduction a law establishing the 13th Judicial District, consisting solely of Richmond County and separating Staten Island from Brooklyn’s 2nd Judicial District. Although Staten Island accounted for more than 15% of the 2nd Judicial District’s population, 91.6% of its elected judges were from Brooklyn. Lanza introduced other legislation to increase the number of elected judges. In 2018 and 2019, the legislature established new elected Supreme Court seats.

=== Ending child marriage ===
Lanza and Assemblywoman Amy Paulin introduced a bill to end child marriage in New York by raising the age of consent from age 14 to 18. The bill addressed an issue highlighted in a New York Times Op-Ed, "America's Child-Marriage Problem.” The piece stated: "A survey by the Tahirih Justice Center, an NGO that provides services to immigrant women and girls, identified as many as 3,000 known or suspected forced-marriage cases just between 2009 and 2011, many involving girls under age 18." Lanza's bill passed the Senate unanimously and Governor Andrew Cuomo signed it into law.

=== I-STOP ===
New York's Internet System for Over-Prescribing Act, or I-STOP, passed unanimously, with Lanza taking the lead in the senate and Assemblyman Michael Cusick a primary sponsor in the State Assembly. The bill was signed into law in 2012 effective in 2013. I-STOP established New York as the first state to mandate that physicians consult a database of a patient's prescription history before prescribing certain drugs. It also made New York the largest state to require real-time data exchange between pharmacists and doctors.

=== Safe Disposal program ===
Lanza joined Assemblyman Michael Cusick to enact bipartisan that established a dedicated Safe Disposal program allowing New Yorkers to safely dispose of expired and unneeded prescription drugs all year long at dedicated locations, including local police precincts.

=== Fentanyl analogs ===
In October, 2017 Governor Andrew Cuomo joined with Senator Lanza, Assemblyman Michael Cusick, and District Attorney Michael McMahon to announce a series of actions to combat the fentanyl crisis on Staten Island and across New York. The Governor promoted legislation to add 11 fentanyl analogs to the state controlled substances schedule. The bill gave law enforcement the ability pursue the dealers who manufacture and sell these drugs. According to the Staten Island Advance, "On Staten Island, fentanyl-related deaths increased more than 700 percent from 2015 to 2016. In 2015, there were seven fentanyl-related deaths which jumped to 58 in 2016." In 2018, the US Drug Enforcement Administration approved an emergency order placing "all illicit fentanyl analogues not already regulated by the Controlled Substances Act into Schedule I - the category for substances with no currently accepted medical use-for two years" The State Legislature enacted the law in 2020, closing the fentanyl loophole.

=== Same-sex marriage ===
In 2011, Lanza voted against the Marriage Equality Act, stating he believed marriage should "describe a union between a man and a woman." The bill passed the Senate 33–29, legally recognizing same-sex marriages performed in New York.

=== Religion ===
In December 2013, Lanza took issue with an American Atheists’ billboard in Times Square. He issued a press release stating "While it is not surprising to me that people who do not believe in God are hateful and malicious, I would have hoped that the people who own this billboard, those who live in Manhattan and around Times Square and the community’s political leaders, would have decried this hate speech as something not to be tolerated or allowed.” likening the billboard to "religious persecution of the kind that similarly lead to the Holocaust.” He called for a boycott of Times Square while the billboard was up and for the IRS to investigate the American Atheists’ tax-exempt status. American Atheists responded by asking if he would call for a business boycott in his own district if a similar billboard were there, and they replicated the Times Square billboard in Staten Island. Lanza issued a press release stating that his assumptions of malice and hatred were targeted at the billboard supporters, not all atheists. He later relented on his calls for an IRS investigation and a boycott of Times Square.

== Electoral history ==
=== 2026 ===
2026 New York State Senate election, District 24
Party	Candidate	Votes	%
Republican	Andrew Lanza		
Conservative	Andrew Lanza		
Total	Andrew Lanza (incumbent)		
Democratic	Alexis Rodriguez		
Write-in			
Total votes			

=== 2024 ===
2024 New York State Senate election, District 24
Party	Candidate	Votes	%
Republican	Andrew Lanza	109,201	88.9
Conservative	Andrew Lanza	11,443	9.3
Total	Andrew Lanza (incumbent)	120,644	98.2
Write-in		2,167	1.8
Total votes		122,811	100.0
Republican hold			

=== 2022 ===
2022 New York State Senate election, District 24
Party	Candidate	Votes	%
Republican	Andrew Lanza	79,313	90.4
Conservative	Andrew Lanza	7,329	8.4
Total	Andrew Lanza (incumbent)	86,642	98.7
Write-in		1,105	1.3
Total votes		87,747	100.0
Republican hold			

=== 2020 ===
2020 New York State Senate election, District 24
Party	Candidate	Votes	%
Republican	Andrew Lanza	112,028	85.4
Conservative	Andrew Lanza	11,400	8.7
Independence	Andrew Lanza	6,468	4.9
Total	Andrew Lanza (incumbent)	129,896	99.0
Write-in		1,285	1.0
Total votes		131,181	100.0
Republican hold			

=== 2018 ===
2018 New York State Senate election, District 24
Party	Candidate	Votes	%
Republican	Andrew Lanza	65,185	80.1
Conservative	Andrew Lanza	6,561	8.1
Independence	Andrew Lanza	6,238	7.7
Reform	Andrew Lanza	2,169	2.7
Total	Andrew Lanza (incumbent)	80,153	98.5
Write-in		1,183	1.5
Total votes		81,336	100.0
Republican hold			

=== 2016 ===
2016 New York State Senate election, District 24
Party	Candidate	Votes	%
Republican	Andrew Lanza	88,720	82.1
Conservative	Andrew Lanza	9,522	8.8
Independence	Andrew Lanza	7,404	6.9
Reform	Andrew Lanza	1,711	1.6
Total	Andrew Lanza (incumbent)	107,357	99.3
Write-in		718	0.7
Total votes		108,075	100.0
Republican hold			

=== 2014 ===
2014 New York State Senate election, District 24
Party	Candidate	Votes	%
Republican	Andrew Lanza	39,010	66.3
Conservative	Andrew Lanza	5,531	9.4
Independence	Andrew Lanza	2,684	4.6
Total	Andrew Lanza (incumbent)	47,225	80.2
Democratic	Gary W. Carsel	10,329	17.6
Working Families	Gary W. Carsel	1,218	2.1
Total	Gary W. Carsel	11,547	19.6
Write-in		77	0.1
Total votes		58,849	100.0
Republican hold			

=== 2012 ===
2012 New York State Senate election, District 24
Party	Candidate	Votes	%
Republican	Andrew Lanza	67,731	64.3
Conservative	Andrew Lanza	7,697	7.3
Independence	Andrew Lanza	2,990	2.8
Total	Andrew Lanza (incumbent)	78,418	74.4
Democratic	Gary W. Carsel	25,561	24.3
Working Families	Gary W. Carsel	1,332	1.3
Total	Gary W. Carsel	26,893	25.5
Write-in		75	0.1
Total votes		105,386	100.0
Republican hold			

=== 2010 ===
2010 New York State Senate election, District 24
Party	Candidate	Votes	%
Republican	Andrew Lanza	43,429	78.9
Conservative	Andrew Lanza	6,492	11.8
Independence	Andrew Lanza	4,681	8.5
Total	Andrew Lanza (incumbent)	54,602	99.2
Write-in		408	0.7
Total votes		55,010	100.0
Republican hold			

=== 2008 ===
2008 New York State Senate election, District 24
Party	Candidate	Votes	%
Republican	Andrew Lanza	66,211	61.7
Conservative	Andrew Lanza	4,704	4.4
Independence	Andrew Lanza	4,456	4.1
Total	Andrew Lanza (incumbent)	75,371	70.2
Democratic	Joseph J. Pancila	32,013	29.8
Write-in		5	0.0
Total votes		107,389	100.0
Republican hold			

=== 2006 ===
2006 New York State Senate Republican primary, District 24
Party	Candidate	Votes	%
Republican	Andrew Lanza	3,825	53.4
Republican	Robert Helbock	3,329	46.5
Write-in		4	0.1
Total votes		7,158	100.0

2006 New York State Senate election, District 24
Party	Candidate	Votes	%
Republican	Andrew Lanza	31,851	53.5
Independence	Andrew Lanza	2,309	3.9
Total	Andrew Lanza	34,160	57.4
Democratic	Matthew Titone	21,737	36.5
Working Families	Matthew Titone	1,337	2.2
Total	Matthew Titone	23,074	38.7
Conservative	Charles T. Pistor Jr.	2,307	3.9
Write-in		12	0.0
Total votes		59,553	100.0
Republican hold			

=== 2005 ===
2005 New York City Council election, District 51
Party	Candidate	Votes	%
Republican	Andrew Lanza	18,746	69.3
Conservative	Andrew Lanza	2,016	7.5
Independence	Andrew Lanza	1,128	4.2
Total	Andrew Lanza (incumbent)	21,890	81.0
Democratic	Craig E. Schlanger	5,143	19.0
Write-in		6	0.0
Total votes		27,039	100.0
Republican hold			

=== 2003 ===
2003 New York City Council election, District 51
Party	Candidate	Votes	%
Republican	Andrew Lanza	8,850	65.6
Conservative	Andrew Lanza	1,645	12.2
Independence	Andrew Lanza	604	4.5
Total	Andrew Lanza (incumbent)	11,099	82.3
Democratic	Roehl Sybing	2,382	17.7
Total votes		13,481	100.0
Republican hold			

=== 2001 ===
2001 New York City Council Republican primary, District 51
Party	Candidate	Votes	%
Republican	Andrew Lanza	4,363	76.7
Republican	Alexander A. DeMarco	1,324	23.3
Write-in		1	0.0
Total votes		5,688	100.0

2001 New York City Council election, District 51
Party	Candidate	Votes	%
Republican	Andrew Lanza	23,421	64.4
Conservative	Andrew Lanza	1,939	5.3
Right to Life	Andrew Lanza	684	1.9
Total	Andrew Lanza	26,044	71.6
Democratic	Janey Moran	9,242	25.4
Working Families	Janey Moran	582	1.6
Total	Janey Moran	9,824	27.0
Independence	Henry J. Bardel	293	0.8
Green	Henry J. Bardel	104	0.3
Liberal	Henry J. Bardel	102	0.3
Total	Henry J. Bardel	499	1.4
Write-in		3	0.0
Total votes		36,370	100.0
Republican hold			

== See also ==
- List of New York state senators
- 2009 New York State Senate leadership crisis
