= 1998 United States House of Representatives elections in New York =

- November 3, 1998

All 31 New York seats to the United States House of Representatives
	Majority party	Minority party
Party	Democratic	Republican
Last election	19	12
Seats won	19	12
Seat change	Steady	Steady
- Results: Democratic hold Republican hold

The 1998 United States House of Representatives elections in New York were held on November 3, 1998, to elect the 31 United States representatives from the State of New York, one from each of the state's 31 congressional districts. The elections were held concurrently with other elections in the state for U.S. Senate, Governor/Lieutenant Governor, Attorney General, Comptroller, and various other local offices. Neither of the two major parties in the U.S. congressional delegation from New York gained any seats, meaning that both parties' seat count in the delegation remained steady.

Prior to the election, four incumbents retired — two from the Democratic Party, and two from the Republican Party. The retiring incumbents were Thomas J. Manton, a Democrat from New York's 7th district; Chuck Schumer, a Democrat from New York's 9th district who resigned to run for U.S. Senator; Gerald B. H. Solomon, a Republican from New York's 22nd district; and Bill Paxon, a Republican from New York's 27th district. All were replaced by candidates who shared their respective parties.

== Overview ==
The results of this election are as follows:

District	Incumbent	Party	First elected	Results	Candidates
New York 1	Michael Forbes	Republican	1994	Incumbent re-elected.	✓ Michael Forbes (Republican) 64%; William Holst (Democratic) 36%
New York 2	Rick Lazio	Republican	1992	Incumbent re-elected.	✓ Rick Lazio (Republican) 67%; John Bace (Democratic) 30%
New York 3	Peter T. King	Republican	1992	Incumbent re-elected.	✓ Peter T. King (Republican) 65%; Kevin Langberg (Democratic) 35%
New York 4	Carolyn McCarthy	Democratic	1996	Incumbent re-elected.	✓ Carolyn McCarthy (Democratic) 53%; Gregory R. Becker (Republican) 47%
New York 5	Gary Ackerman	Democratic	1983	Incumbent re-elected.	✓ Gary Ackerman (Democratic) 65%; David Pinzon (Republican) 34%
New York 6	Gregory W. Meeks	Democratic	February 3, 1998 (Special)	Incumbent re-elected.	✓ Gregory W. Meeks (Democratic); Unopposed
New York 7	Thomas J. Manton	Democratic	1984	Incumbent retired. New member elected. Democratic hold.	✓ Joseph Crowley (Democratic) 68%; James Dillon (Republican) 28%
New York 8	Jerrold Nadler	Democratic	1992	Incumbent re-elected.	✓ Jerrold Nadler (Democratic) 86%; Ted Howard (Republican) 14%
New York 9	Chuck Schumer	Democratic	1980	Incumbent retired to run for U.S. Senator. New member elected. Democratic hold.	✓ Anthony Weiner (Democratic) 66%; Leslie Telano (Republican) 24%
New York 10	Edolphus Towns	Democratic	1982	Incumbent re-elected.	✓ Edolphus Towns (Democratic) 92%; Ernestine Brown (Republican) 7%
New York 11	Major Owens	Democratic	1982	Incumbent re-elected.	✓ Major Owens (Democratic) 89%; David Greene (Republican) 10%
New York 12	Nydia Velázquez	Democratic	1992	Incumbent re-elected.	✓ Nydia Velázquez (Democratic) 83%; Rosemarie Markgraf (Republican) 13%
New York 13	Vito Fossella	Republican	1997	Incumbent re-elected.	✓ Vito Fossella (Republican) 66%; Eugene Prisco (Democratic) 34%
New York 14	Carolyn Maloney	Democratic	1992	Incumbent re-elected.	✓ Carolyn Maloney (Democratic) 77%; Stephanie Kupferman (Republican) 23%
New York 15	Charles B. Rangel	Democratic	1970	Incumbent re-elected.	✓ Charles B. Rangel (Democratic) 94%; David Cunningham (Republican) 6%
New York 16	José E. Serrano	Democratic	1990	Incumbent re-elected.	✓ José E. Serrano (Democratic) 96%; Thomas Bayley (Republican) 4%
New York 17	Eliot Engel	Democratic	1988	Incumbent re-elected.	✓ Eliot Engel (Democratic) 88%; Peter Fiumefreddo (Republican) 12%
New York 18	Nita Lowey	Democratic	1988	Incumbent re-elected.	✓ Nita Lowey (Democratic); Unopposed
New York 19	Sue W. Kelly	Republican	1994	Incumbent re-elected.	✓ Sue W. Kelly (Republican) 63%; Dick Collins (Democratic) 34%
New York 20	Benjamin A. Gilman	Republican	1972	Incumbent re-elected.	✓ Benjamin A. Gilman (Republican) 58%; Paul Feiner (Democratic) 40%
New York 21	Michael R. McNulty	Democratic	1988	Incumbent re-elected.	✓ Michael R. McNulty (Democratic) 74%; Lauren Ayers (Republican) 26%
New York 22	Gerald B. H. Solomon	Republican	1978	Incumbent retired. New member elected. Republican hold.	✓ John E. Sweeney (Republican) 56%; Jean Bordewich (Democratic) 43%
New York 23	Sherwood Boehlert	Republican	1982	Incumbent re-elected.	✓ Sherwood Boehlert (Republican); Unopposed
New York 24	John M. McHugh	Republican	1992	Incumbent re-elected.	✓ John M. McHugh (Republican) 79%; Neil Tallon (Democratic) 21%
New York 25	James T. Walsh	Republican	1988	Incumbent re-elected.	✓ James T. Walsh (Republican) 69%; Yvonne Rothenberg (Democratic) 31%
New York 26	Maurice Hinchey	Democratic	1992	Incumbent re-elected.	✓ Maurice Hinchey (Democratic) 62%; William Walker (Republican) 31%; Randall Terry (Independent) 7%
New York 27	Bill Paxon	Republican	1988	Incumbent retired. New member elected. Republican hold.	✓ Thomas M. Reynolds (Republican) 58%; Bill Cook (Democratic) 42%
New York 28	Louise Slaughter	Democratic	1986	Incumbent re-elected.	✓ Louise Slaughter (Democratic) 65%; Richard Kaplan (Republican) 31%
New York 29	John J. LaFalce	Democratic	1974	Incumbent re-elected.	✓ John J. LaFalce (Democratic) 58%; Chris Collins (Republican) 41%
New York 30	Jack Quinn	Republican	1992	Incumbent re-elected.	✓ Jack Quinn (Republican) 68%; Crystal Peoples (Democratic) 32%
New York 31	Amo Houghton	Republican	1986	Incumbent re-elected.	✓ Amo Houghton (Republican) 69%; Caleb Rossiter (Democratic) 25%

== See also ==
- 1998 United States House of Representatives elections
