= John Lavelle =

John Lavelle may refer to:

- John W. Lavelle (1949–2007), member of the New York State Assembly
- John Lavelle (actor) (born 1981), American actor
- John D. Lavelle (1916–1979), U.S. Air Force general
