= 2006 New York State Senate election =

- November 7, 2006

All 62 seats in the New York State Senate 32 seats needed for a majority
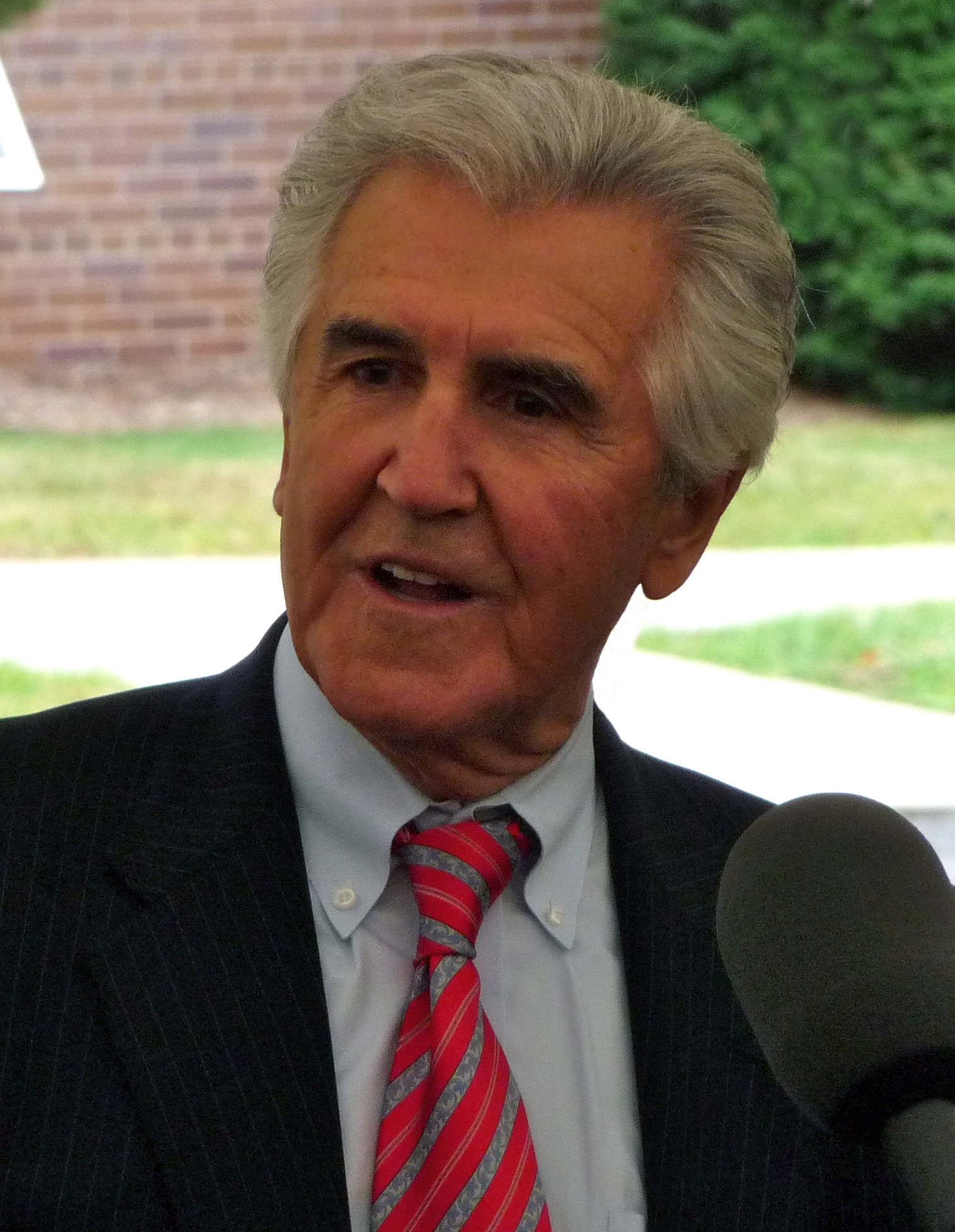

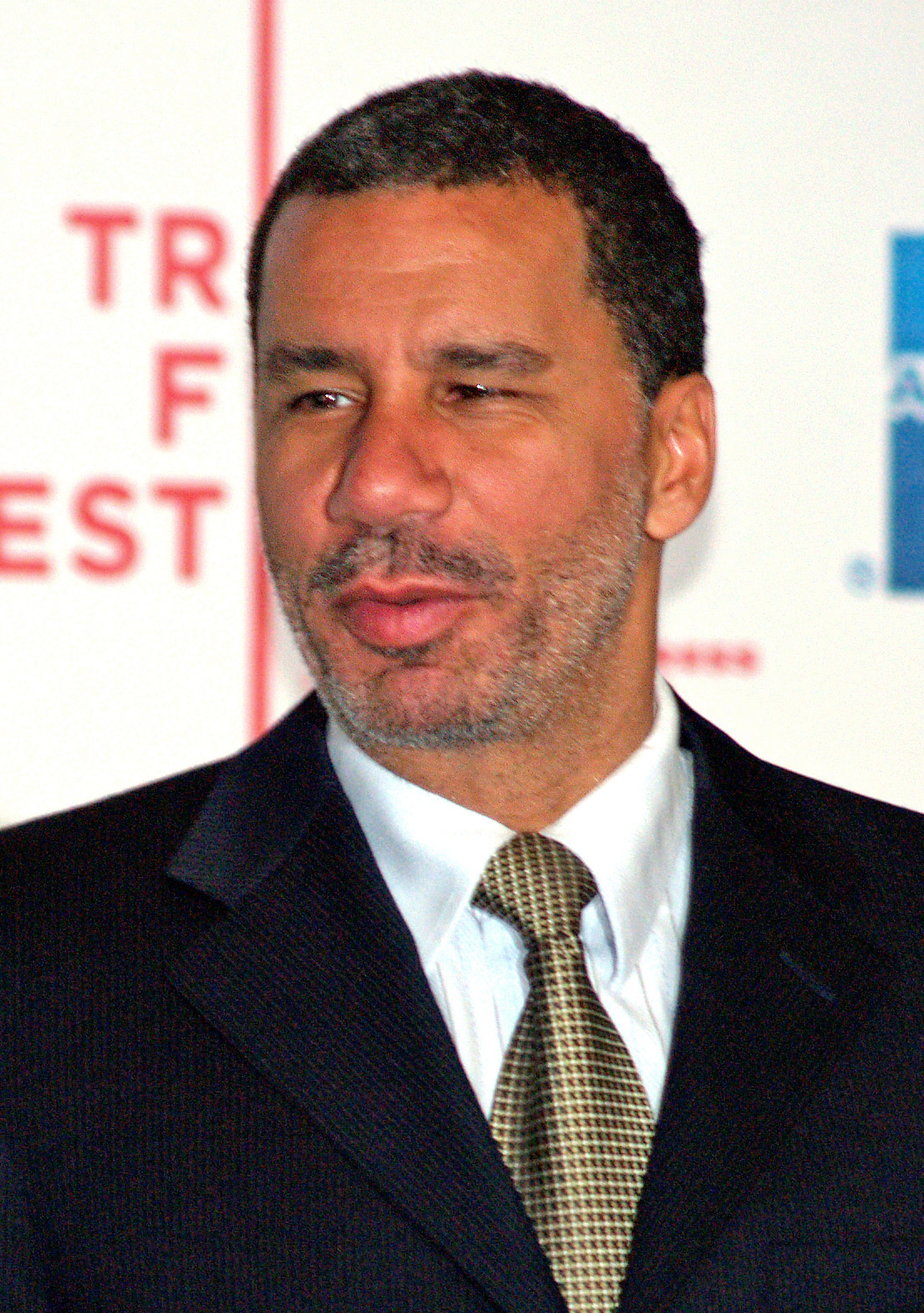
	Majority party	Minority party
Leader	Joseph Bruno	David Paterson (retired)
Party	Republican	Democratic
Leader since	November 25, 1994	January 1, 2003
Leader's seat	District 43	District 30
Last election	35	27
Seats after	33	29
Seat change	▼2	▲2
Temporary President and Majority Leader before election
Joseph Bruno
Republican
Elected Temporary President and Majority Leader
Joseph Bruno
Republican

The 2006 New York State Senate election was held on November 7, 2006, to determine which party would control the New York State Senate for the following two years in the 197th New York State Legislature. All 62 seats in the New York State Senate were up for election and the primary was held on September 12, 2006. Prior to the election, 35 seats were held by Republicans and 27 seats were held by Democrats. The general election saw Democrats gain 2 seats, meaning Republicans maintained their majority in the State Senate.

== Predictions ==
Source	Ranking	As of
Governing	Likely R	November 4, 2006

== Retirements ==
=== Democrats ===
1. District 10: Ada L. Smith retired.
2. District 20: Carl Andrews retired to unsuccessfully run for New York's 11th congressional district.
3. District 30: David Paterson retired to successfully run for lieutenant governor of New York.

=== Republicans ===
1. District 24: John J. Marchi retired.
2. District 35: Nicholas A. Spano retired.
3. District 47: Raymond A. Meier retired to unsuccessfully run for New York's 24th congressional district.

== Closest races ==
Seats where the margin of victory was under 10%:

1. District 15, 2.20%
2. District 35, 2.33% (gain)

== Results ==
=== District 1 ===
District 1 election, 2006
Party	Candidate	Votes	%
Republican	Kenneth LaValle (incumbent)	54,971	59.37%
Democratic	Michael Comando	31,503	34.02%
	Scattering	6,118	6.61%
Total votes		92,592	100.0%
Republican hold			

=== District 2 ===
District 2 election, 2006
Party	Candidate	Votes	%
Republican	John J. Flanagan (incumbent)	48,458	56.79%
Democratic	Brooke Ellison	33,184	38.89%
	Scattering	3,682	4.32%
Total votes		85,324	100.0%
Republican hold			

=== District 3 ===
District 3 election, 2006
Party	Candidate	Votes	%
Republican	Caesar Trunzo (incumbent)	33,261	49.41%
Democratic	Jimmy Dahroug	27,705	41.16%
	Scattering	5,004	7.43%
Working Families	David Ochoa	1,345	2.00%
Total votes		67,315	100.0%
Republican hold			

=== District 4 ===
District 4 election, 2006
Party	Candidate	Votes	%
Republican	Owen H. Johnson (incumbent)	35,942	51.91%
Democratic	James J. Mc Donald	25,442	36.75%
	Scattering	7,852	11.34%
Total votes		69,236	100.0%
Republican hold			

=== District 5 ===
District 5 election, 2006
Party	Candidate	Votes	%
Republican	Carl Marcellino (incumbent)	49,721	52.55%
Democratic	Leslie C, Bielanski	37,223	39.35%
	Scattering	7,661	8.10%
Total votes		94,605	100.0%
Republican hold			

=== District 6 ===
District 6 election, 2006
Party	Candidate	Votes	%
Republican	Kemp Hannon (incumbent)	40,277	50.95%
Democratic	Casilda E. Roper-Simpson	29,656	37.52%
	Scattering	9,114	11.53%
Total votes		79,047	100.0%
Republican hold			

=== District 7 ===
District 7 election, 2006
Party	Candidate	Votes	%
Republican	Michael Balboni (incumbent)	44,373	52.66%
Democratic	Joseph Hand	32,295	38.33%
	Scattering	7,590	9.01%
Total votes		84,258	100.0%
Republican hold			

=== District 8 ===
District 8 election, 2006
Party	Candidate	Votes	%
Republican	Charles J. Fuschillo Jr. (incumbent)	46,806	55.39%
Democratic	Adam E. Small	29,789	35.25%
	Scattering	7,905	9.36%
Total votes		84,500	100.0%
Republican hold			

=== District 9 ===
District 9 election, 2006
Party	Candidate	Votes	%
Republican	Dean Skelos (incumbent)	53,545	59.72%
Democratic	Odelia Goldberg	30,772	34.32%
	Scattering	5,348	5.96%
Total votes		89,665	100.0%
Republican hold			

=== District 10 ===
District 10 election, 2006
Party	Candidate	Votes	%
Democratic	Shirley Huntley	34,771	67.32%
	Scattering	13,082	25.33%
Republican	Jereline Hunter	3,797	7.35%
Total votes		51,650	100.0%
Democratic hold			

=== District 11 ===
District 11 election, 2006
Party	Candidate	Votes	%
Republican	Frank Padavan (incumbent)	31,019	53.56%
Democratic	Nora C. Marino	21,283	36.75%
	Scattering	5,610	9.69%
Total votes		57,912	100.0%
Republican hold			

=== District 12 ===
District 12 election, 2006
Party	Candidate	Votes	%
Democratic	George Onorato (incumbent)	27,836	65.80%
	Scattering	14,465	34.20%
Total votes		42,301	100.0%
Democratic hold			

=== District 13 ===
District 13 election, 2006
Party	Candidate	Votes	%
Democratic	John Sabini (incumbent)	22,336	68.27%
	Scattering	10,382	31.73%
Total votes		32,718	100.0%
Democratic hold			

=== District 14 ===
District 14 election, 2006
Party	Candidate	Votes	%
Democratic	Malcolm Smith (incumbent)	37,328	70.80%
	Scattering	15,392	29.20%
Total votes		52,720	100.0%
Democratic hold			

=== District 15 ===
District 15 election, 2006
Party	Candidate	Votes	%
Republican	Serphin R. Maltese (incumbent)	17,940	44.15%
Democratic	Albert Baldeo	17,046	41.95%
	Scattering	5,647	13.90%
Total votes		40,633	100.0%
Republican hold			

=== District 16 ===
District 16 election, 2006
Party	Candidate	Votes	%
Democratic	Toby Ann Stavisky (incumbent)	36,134	68.56%
	Scattering	16,573	31.44%
Total votes		52,707	100.0%
Democratic hold			

=== District 17 ===
District 17 election, 2006
Party	Candidate	Votes	%
Democratic	Martin Malave Dilan (incumbent)	25,388	68.24%
	Scattering	9,450	25.40%
Republican	Victor F. Guarino	2,365	6.36%
Total votes		37,203	100.0%
Democratic hold			

=== District 18 ===
District 18 election, 2006
Party	Candidate	Votes	%
Democratic	Velmanette Montgomery (incumbent)	42,869	76.22%
	Scattering	10,958	19.48%
Republican	Viviana Vazquez- Hernandez	2,420	4.30%
Total votes		56,247	100.0%
Democratic hold			

=== District 19 ===
District 19 election, 2006
Party	Candidate	Votes	%
Democratic	John L. Sampson (incumbent)	31,471	68.62%
	Scattering	12,586	27.44%
Republican	Mary J. Vicino	1,807	3.94%
Total votes		45,864	100.0%
Democratic hold			

=== District 20 ===
District 20 election, 2006
Party	Candidate	Votes	%
Democratic	Eric Adams	38,713	70.73%
	Scattering	15,042	27.49%
Conservative	James M. Gay	974	1.78%
Total votes		54,729	100.0%
Democratic hold			

=== District 21 ===
District 21 election, 2006
Party	Candidate	Votes	%
Democratic	Kevin Parker (incumbent)	30,516	67.73%
	Scattering	10,867	24.12%
Republican	Salvatore Grupico	3,674	8.15%
Total votes		45,057	100.0%
Democratic hold			

=== District 22 ===
District 22 election, 2006
Party	Candidate	Votes	%
Republican	Marty Golden (incumbent)	22,082	50.43%
	Scattering	21,704	49.57%
Total votes		43,786	100.0%
Republican hold			

=== District 23 ===
District 23 election, 2006
Party	Candidate	Votes	%
Democratic	Diane Savino (incumbent)	23,497	60.83%
	Scattering	15,132	39.17%
Total votes		38,629	100.0%
Democratic hold			

=== District 24 ===
District 24 election, 2006
Party	Candidate	Votes	%
Republican	Andrew Lanza	34,160	52.71%
Democratic	Matthew J. Titone	23,074	35.61%
	Scattering	5,261	8.12%
Conservative	Charles T. Pistor Jr	2,307	3.56%
Total votes		64,802	100.0%
Republican hold			

=== District 25 ===
District 25 election, 2006
Party	Candidate	Votes	%
Democratic	Martin Connor (incumbent)	40,822	62.69%
	Scattering	15,645	24.03%
Working Families	Ken Diamondstone	8,649	13.28%
Total votes		65,116	100.0%
Democratic hold			

=== District 26 ===
District 26 election, 2006
Party	Candidate	Votes	%
Democratic	Liz Krueger (incumbent)	64,485	73.30%
Republican	Philip Pidot	16,303	18.53%
	Scattering	7,191	8.17%
Total votes		87,979	100.0%
Democratic hold			

=== District 27 ===
District 27 election, 2006
Party	Candidate	Votes	%
Democratic	Carl Kruger (incumbent)	27,668	62.06%
	Scattering	15,062	33.78%
Conservative	Mildred R. Mahoney	1,853	4.16%
Total votes		44,583	100.0%
Democratic hold			

=== District 28 ===
District 28 election, 2006
Party	Candidate	Votes	%
Democratic	José M. Serrano (incumbent)	31,642	65.20%
	Scattering	15,132	34.80%
Total votes		43,485	100.0%
Democratic hold			

=== District 29 ===
District 29 election, 2006
Party	Candidate	Votes	%
Democratic	Thomas Duane (incumbent)	80,076	81.35%
Republican	Dan Russo	9,923	9.96%
	Scattering	9,656	9.69%
Total votes		99,655	100.0%
Democratic hold			

=== District 30 ===
District 30 election, 2006
Party	Candidate	Votes	%
Democratic	Bill Perkins	53,456	78.13%
	Scattering	11,021	16.11%
Republican	Al Mosley	2,528	3.70%
Independent	Jessie Fields	1,411	2.06%
Total votes		68,416	100.0%
Democratic hold			

=== District 31 ===
District 31 election, 2006
Party	Candidate	Votes	%
Democratic	Eric Schneiderman (incumbent)	51,202	74.30%
	Scattering	13,440	19.50%
Republican	Stylo A. Sapaskis	4,270	6.20%
Total votes		68,912	100.0%
Democratic hold			

=== District 32 ===
District 32 election, 2006
Party	Candidate	Votes	%
Democratic	Rubén Díaz Sr. (incumbent)	30,184	69.85%
	Scattering	10,574	24.47%
Republican	Arlene Anderson	2,453	5.68%
Total votes		43,211	100.0%
Democratic hold			

=== District 33 ===
District 33 election, 2006
Party	Candidate	Votes	%
Democratic	Efrain Gonzalez Jr. (incumbent)	23,304	66.59%
	Scattering	10,957	31.31%
Conservative	Ernest Kebreau	734	2.10%
Total votes		34,995	100.0%
Democratic hold			

=== District 34 ===
District 34 election, 2006
Party	Candidate	Votes	%
Democratic	Jeffrey D. Klein (incumbent)	32,622	55.60%
Republican	Joseph J. Savino	20,664	35.22%
	Scattering	5,387	9.18%
Total votes		58,673	100.0%
Democratic hold			

=== District 35 ===
District 35 election, 2006
Party	Candidate	Votes	%
Democratic	Andrea Stewart-Cousins	43,241	48.60%
Republican	Nick Spano	41,162	46.27%
	Scattering	4,561	5.13%
Total votes		88,964	100.0%
Democratic gain from Republican			

=== District 36 ===
District 36 election, 2006
Party	Candidate	Votes	%
Democratic	Ruth Hassell-Thompson (incumbent)	41,007	77.06%
	Scattering	10,244	19.25%
Republican	Curtis Brooks	1,966	3.69%
Total votes		53,217	100.0%
Democratic hold			

=== District 37 ===
District 37 election, 2006
Party	Candidate	Votes	%
Democratic	Suzi Oppenheimer (incumbent)	61,970	67.13%
	Scattering	30,338	32.87%
Total votes		92,308	100.0%
Democratic hold			

=== District 38 ===
District 38 election, 2006
Party	Candidate	Votes	%
Republican	Thomas P. Morahan (incumbent)	55,129	57.53%
Democratic	Nancy Low-Hogan	32,692	34.12%
	Scattering	7,996	8.35%
Total votes		95,817	100.0%
Republican hold			

=== District 39 ===
District 39 election, 2006
Party	Candidate	Votes	%
Republican	William J. Larkin Jr. (incumbent)	48,219	56.67%
Democratic	Christopher P. McBride	28,201	33.14%
	Scattering	8,668	10.19%
Total votes		85,088	100.0%
Republican hold			

=== District 40 ===
District 40 election, 2006
Party	Candidate	Votes	%
Republican	Vincent Leibell (incumbent)	53,172	52.06%
Democratic	Michael B. Kaplowitz	41,939	41.06%
	Scattering	7,029	6.88%
Total votes		102,140	100.0%
Republican hold			

=== District 41 ===
District 41 election, 2006
Party	Candidate	Votes	%
Republican	Stephen M. Saland (incumbent)	52,944	53.76%
Democratic	Brian Keeler	38,057	38.65%
	Scattering	7,471	7.59%
Total votes		98,472	100.0%
Republican hold			

=== District 42 ===
District 42 election, 2006
Party	Candidate	Votes	%
Republican	John Bonacic (incumbent)	50,581	53.35%
Democratic	Susan E. Zimet	38,403	40.50%
	Scattering	5,832	6.15%
Total votes		94,816	100.0%
Republican hold			

=== District 43 ===
District 43 election, 2006
Party	Candidate	Votes	%
Republican	Joseph Bruno (incumbent)	70,156	59.07%
	Scattering	48,608	40.93%
Total votes		118,764	100.0%
Republican hold			

=== District 44 ===
District 44 election, 2006
Party	Candidate	Votes	%
Republican	Hugh Farley (incumbent)	61,659	59.00%
Democratic	Gary R. McCarthy	32,461	31.07%
	Scattering	7,543	7.22%
Working Families	Jeffrey P. Stark	2,831	2.71%
Total votes		104,494	100.0%
Republican hold			

=== District 45 ===
District 45 election, 2006
Party	Candidate	Votes	%
Republican	Betty Little (incumbent)	64,105	65.33%
Democratic	Timothy C. Merrick	27,697	28.23%
	Scattering	6,317	6.44%
Total votes		98,119	100.0%
Republican hold			

=== District 46 ===
District 46 election, 2006
Party	Candidate	Votes	%
Democratic	Neil Breslin (incumbent)	82,616	74.09%
	Scattering	28,893	25.91%
Total votes		111,509	100.0%
Democratic hold			

=== District 47 ===
District 47 election, 2006
Party	Candidate	Votes	%
Republican	Joseph Griffo	43,662	46.88%
Democratic	John L. Murad	31,370	33.69%
	Scattering	7,125	7.65%
Working Families	Leon R. Koziol	5,938	6.38%
Independent	Timothy J. Julian	5,033	5.40%
Total votes		93,128	100.0%
Republican hold			

=== District 48 ===
District 48 election, 2006
Party	Candidate	Votes	%
Republican	James W. Wright (incumbent)	48,761	65.71%
	Scattering	25,449	34.29%
Total votes		74,210	100.0%
Republican hold			

=== District 49 ===
District 49 election, 2006
Party	Candidate	Votes	%
Democratic	David Valesky (incumbent)	53,555	56.69%
Republican	Jeff Brown	36,875	39.03%
	Scattering	4,045	4.28%
Total votes		94,475	100.0%
Democratic hold			

=== District 50 ===
District 50 election, 2006
Party	Candidate	Votes	%
Republican	John DeFrancisco (incumbent)	61,675	59.61%
Democratic	Carol E. Mulcahy	35,660	34.47%
	Scattering	6,123	5.92%
Total votes		103,458	100.0%
Republican hold			

=== District 51 ===
District 51 election, 2006
Party	Candidate	Votes	%
Republican	James L. Seward (incumbent)	59,224	60.84%
	Scattering	38,120	39.16%
Total votes		97,344	100.0%
Republican hold			

=== District 52 ===
District 52 election, 2006
Party	Candidate	Votes	%
Republican	Thomas W. Libous (incumbent)	52,895	56.41%
Democratic	Mark Trabucco	37,102	39.57%
	Scattering	3,773	4.02%
Total votes		93,770	100.0%
Republican hold			

=== District 53 ===
District 53 election, 2006
Party	Candidate	Votes	%
Republican	George H. Winner Jr. (incumbent)	51,422	58.01%
	Scattering	37,228	41.99%
Total votes		88,650	100.0%
Republican hold			

=== District 54 ===
District 54 election, 2006
Party	Candidate	Votes	%
Republican	Michael F. Nozzolio (incumbent)	62,495	64.65%
	Scattering	34,178	35.35%
Total votes		96,673	100.0%
Republican hold			

=== District 55 ===
District 55 election, 2006
Party	Candidate	Votes	%
Republican	James S. Alesi (incumbent)	64,698	58.33%
Democratic	Eugene F. Saltzberg	37,778	34.06%
	Scattering	8,442	7.61%
Total votes		110,918	100.0%
Republican hold			

=== District 56 ===
District 56 election, 2006
Party	Candidate	Votes	%
Republican	Joseph Robach (incumbent)	50,411	61.37%
Democratic	Willa Powell	26,434	32.18%
	Scattering	5,298	6.45%
Total votes		82,143	100.0%
Republican hold			

=== District 57 ===
District 57 election, 2006
Party	Candidate	Votes	%
Republican	Catharine Young (incumbent)	55,260	67.42%
	Scattering	26,701	32.58%
Total votes		81,961	100.0%
Republican hold			

=== District 58 ===
District 58 election, 2006
Party	Candidate	Votes	%
Democratic	William Stachowski (incumbent)	60,012	68.16%
Republican	Joseph J. Mesler	17,614	20.01%
	Scattering	10,412	11.83%
Total votes		88,038	100.0%
Democratic hold			

=== District 59 ===
District 59 election, 2006
Party	Candidate	Votes	%
Republican	Dale M. Volker (incumbent)	57,246	55.66%
Democratic	Tom Casey	35,911	34.91%
	Scattering	9,704	9.43%
Total votes		102,861	100.0%
Republican hold			

=== District 60 ===
District 60 election, 2006
Party	Candidate	Votes	%
Democratic	Antoine Thompson	37,623	56.05%
	Scattering	14,964	22.30%
Independent	Marc A. Coppola (incumbent)	14,528	21.65%
Total votes		67,115	100.0%
Democratic gain from Independent			

=== District 61 ===
District 61 election, 2006
Party	Candidate	Votes	%
Republican	Mary Lou Rath (incumbent)	67,216	61.95%
Democratic	Richard L. Woll	31,423	28.96%
	Scattering	9,864	9.09%
Total votes		108,503	100.0%
Republican hold			

=== District 62 ===
District 62 election, 2006
Party	Candidate	Votes	%
Republican	George Maziarz (incumbent)	58,510	63.33%
Democratic	Christopher M. Srock	24,799	26.84%
	Scattering	9,078	9.83%
Total votes		92,387	100.0%
Republican hold			
