= Frank Morano =

New York politician (born 1984)

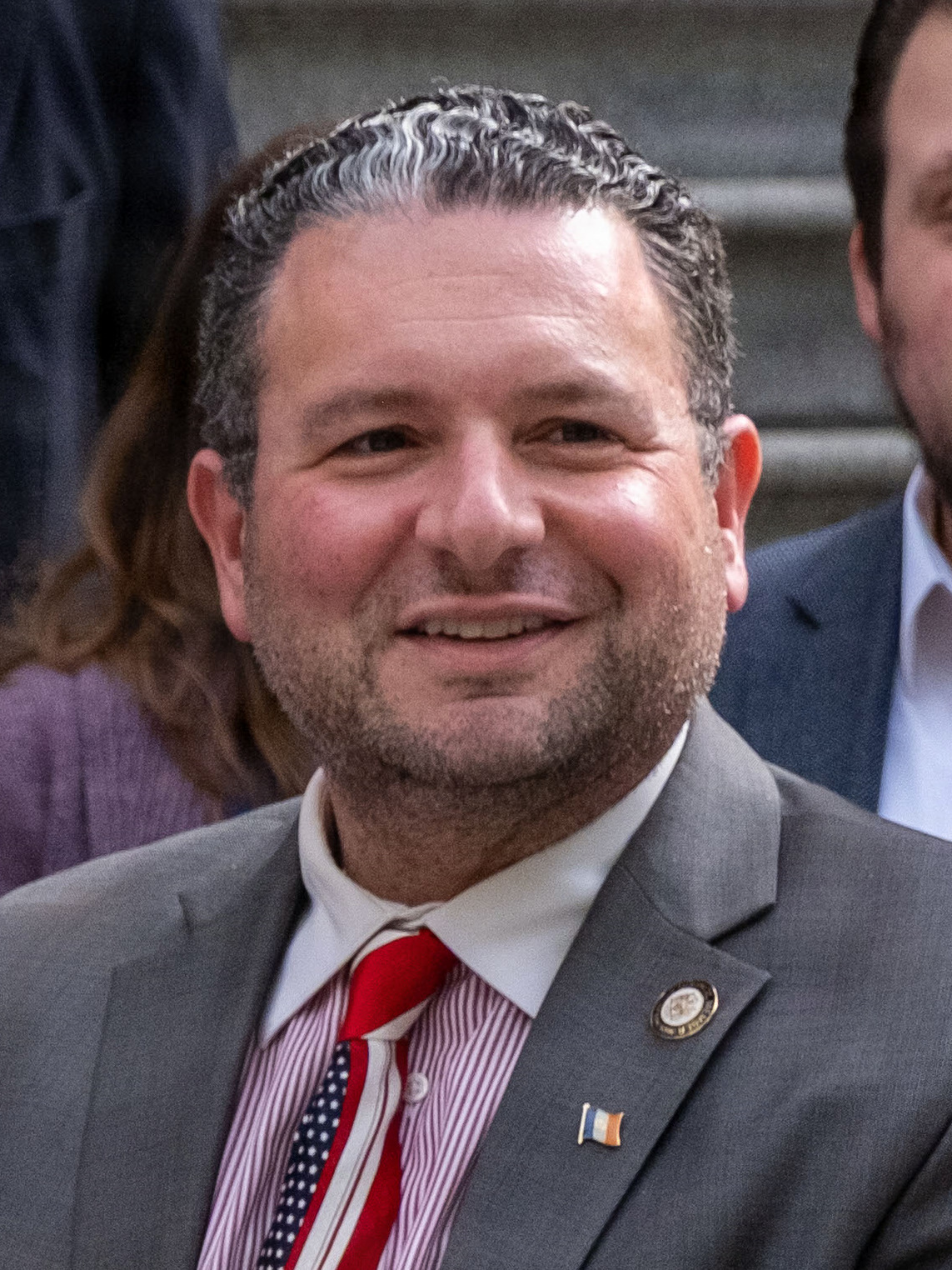
- Morano in 2026

Member of the New York City Council from the 51st district
- Incumbent
- Assumed office May 13, 2025
- Preceded by: Joe Borelli

Personal details
- Born: 1984 or 1985 (age 41–42) New York City, New York, U.S.
- Party: Republican
- Education: New York University (BA)
- Website: City Council website Campaign website

Frank Morano (born 1984/1985) is an American radio host and politician serving as a member of the New York City Council for the 51st district. He was elected in a 2025 special election to succeed Joe Borelli, who resigned to join the private sector. A Republican, his district includes the South Shore of Staten Island.

== Early life and education ==
Morano was born on Staten Island to parents who moved there from Brooklyn.

== Career ==
=== Public-access television broadcasting ===
Morano began his broadcasting career as a teenager. At age 16, he launched Morano Vision, a public-access television program that focused on politics and current affairs. The show featured interviews with local elected officials and controversial public figures, and helped establish Morano's early presence in Staten Island political media.

=== Film production ===
In 2017, Morano served as a producer of Get Me Roger Stone, a documentary film examining the life and career of Republican political strategist Roger Stone. The film premiered at the Tribeca Film Festival and was released globally by Netflix, and was described by Variety as "lively, fun, sickening and essential".

=== Radio broadcasting ===
Morano hosted The Answer on WNYM (AM 970), where he was described by City & State as "the people's talk show host" and hosted a weekly Sunday morning program.

In July 2020, Morano joined WABC (AM 770), where he hosted a local midday program on its Long Island rebroadcaster WLIR-FM (replacing the syndicated Brian Kilmeade due to his show being cleared by WRCN-FM), and the Sunday night Frank Morano Program. In October 2020, Morano began hosting the weekday overnight show The Other Side of Midnight, replacing the syndicated Red Eye Radio on WABC's lineup.

During Morano's 2025 City Council campaign, his programs were pulled from WABC due to federal equal-time requirements, though The Other Side of Midnight continued in syndication. After the election, Morano formally departed the station, with radio host Lionel succeeding him as host of The Other Side of Midnight.

=== Political activism ===
Morano has been active in Staten Island and New York City politics for many years prior to holding elected office. He has been affiliated with a number of conservative and populist political organizations and minor parties, and has frequently participated in intraparty debates over ballot access, endorsements, and party governance.

In the mid-2000s, Morano served as a member of the executive committee of the New York State Independence Party. Morano later became involved with the Reform Party of New York State.

Prior to his election to the City Council, Morano worked in Staten Island Republican politics, including employment in the office of City Councilmember Joe Borelli.

In a 2025 interview with The New York Times, Republican mayoral candidate Curtis Sliwa described Morano as a protégé and characterized him as a populist figure within Staten Island politics, listing him among elected officials he viewed as ideologically aligned.

=== Community Board service ===
In September 2013, Morano was appointed to Staten Island Community Board 3 after a multi-year effort to secure a seat. His appointment followed changes in eligibility after he left the executive committee of the New York State Independence Party, which had previously made him ineligible under a borough policy barring party officers from serving on community boards. Morano criticized the policy as overly restrictive but ultimately declined to pursue legal action and instead sought appointment after leaving party leadership. Upon joining the board, he was assigned to the Traffic and Transportation Committee and stated that addressing chronic traffic issues on Staten Island's South Shore would be a top priority.

In 2024, while serving as a member of Community Board 3 and prior to holding elected office, Morano raised concerns regarding the board's governance practices, including its reliance on fully virtual meetings, the availability of meeting recordings, notice of executive sessions, and the process used to hire a new district manager. In September 2024, Vito Fossella, the Borough President of Staten Island, and City Councilmembers Joseph Borelli and David Carr requested guidance from the New York City Law Department on whether Community Board 3's actions complied with state and city law. Morano was not a signatory to the request but had previously raised similar procedural concerns in his capacity as a community board member.

In November 2024, the New York City Law Department issued a formal determination finding that Community Board 3 had violated certain provisions of the New York State Open Meetings Law and city hiring requirements, including rules governing public posting of job openings and public access to meeting recordings. The department recommended corrective actions and stated that it would provide continued guidance to ensure compliance going forward.

In February 2025, the longtime chair of Community Board 3 resigned amid ongoing disputes with borough and city officials over governance and compliance issues. In the months that followed, several Community Board 3 members were not reappointed as part of a broader restructuring overseen by the borough president's office.

After being elected to the New York City Council later in 2025, Morano advocated for changes to the New York City Charter that would grant City Council members binding appointment authority for a portion of community board seats. He argued that the reform would increase accountability, transparency, and local representation, particularly in cases where community board governance had become the subject of sustained public concern.

== New York City Council ==
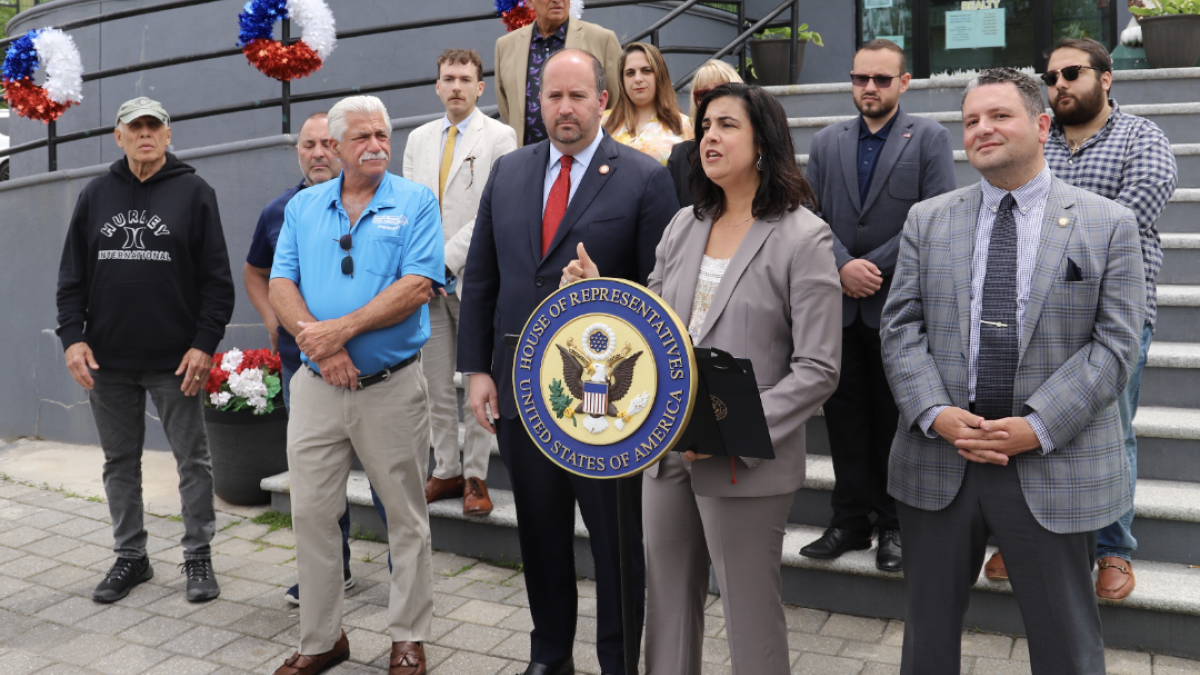
Morano (right) joins U.S. Representative Nicole Malliotakis (center) and fellow councilmember David Carr (left) at a SALT press conference in May 2025.

In 2025, Morano was elected to the New York City Council for the 51st district in a special election to replace Joe Borelli, defeating Democrat Cliff Hagen and Griffin Fossella with 59% of the vote. He will serve the remainder of Borelli's term and run for re-election in November for a full term. He was sworn in on May 13, 2025.

In July 2025, Morano participated in a news conference in Tottenville supporting residents whose pet pygmy pig, Lucy, faced removal by city health officials following a complaint that farm animals were being kept illegally as pets. The case drew widespread local attention and prompted public appeals from the family and community members. Mayor Eric Adams subsequently announced that the city would not take punitive action against the family and allowed the animal to remain temporarily in the home. The episode was covered by The New York Times as an example of constituent advocacy and neighborhood response to city enforcement actions.

In September 2025, Morano publicly opposed a proposed commercial motor freight station along Arthur Kill Road in the Charleston section of Staten Island at a Community Board 3 meeting, where the board ultimately voted to reject the application. The project, which would have accommodated approximately 180 tractor-trailers per day, drew opposition from residents and elected officials. In January 2026, the New York City Department of City Planning confirmed that the project had been placed on hold.

In December 2025, Morano called on Mayor Eric Adams to veto the Community Opportunity to Purchase Act (COPA), a bill passed by the City Council that would grant certain nonprofit organizations a first opportunity to purchase designated distressed residential properties before they are offered on the open market. Morano criticized the legislation as an interference with private property rights that could deter investment and delay transactions, and argued that it would reduce housing supply. Supporters of the bill, including its primary sponsor, Councilmember Sandy Nurse, said it would help preserve affordable housing by giving nonprofits greater ability to intervene in property sales.

In 2025, Morano proposed a citywide initiative to fly each of New York City's five borough flags at City Hall on a rotating monthly basis, arguing that the practice would promote civic pride and awareness of borough history. He formally requested the change in a letter to Mayor Eric Adams and linked the initiative to his legislation, Introduction 1388, which sought to codify the official flag of Staten Island in the city's Administrative Code. In October 2025, Staten Island's flag was raised at City Hall for the first time in city history under a new borough flag rotation program, with Staten Island leading off.

In January 2026, Morano was among three Republican members of the City Council who publicly urged Council Speaker Julie Menin to serve as a counterbalance to Mayor Zohran Mamdani. In reporting on the council's early dynamics, The New York Times quoted Morano saying that nearly one million New Yorkers had voted for "something different" and that those voters were counting on the City Council and its leadership to "be a voice for them."

In January 2026, Morano was profiled by City & State as part of its overview of newly elected New York City Council members. In the feature, he discussed his Staten Island roots, constituent priorities, and legislative goals, including advancing guardianship reform, fertility treatment access, and efforts to codify the Staten Island borough flag in city law.

On January 15, 2026, Morano was appointed chair of the New York City Council Committee on Veterans for the new Council term.

In March 2026, Morano was elected co-chair of the New York City Council's Italian Caucus, alongside Queens Councilmember Joann Ariola. In that role, he said he would focus on promoting Italian-American heritage and preserving cultural traditions, including the observance of Columbus Day. The Staten Island Advance reported that Morano emphasized the historical contributions of Italian-Americans to New York City and the importance of maintaining longstanding cultural celebrations.

In March 2026, Morano was elected co-chair of the New York City Council's bipartisan Common Sense Caucus, alongside Councilmember Phil Wong. The caucus, composed of moderate Democrats and Republicans, focuses on issues such as public safety and fiscal responsibility. According to City & State New York, Morano was selected as part of a leadership restructuring following internal disputes that led to the departure of several members. Additional reporting by Gothamist noted that the leadership change occurred amid disagreements within the caucus over governance and direction, which some departing members publicly criticized.

In March 2026, Morano joined other Staten Island Republican elected officials at a news conference outside the Staten Island Courthouse after the U.S. Supreme Court blocked an effort to redraw the borough's congressional district lines. Speaking at the event, Morano cited Justice Samuel Alito's concurring opinion and criticized attempts to alter district boundaries on racial grounds, arguing that such approaches risked undermining constitutional protections and creating instability in the redistricting process.

In March 2026, Morano commented on efforts by the City Council Ethics Committee to censure Councilmember Vickie Paladino over social media posts that other council members characterized as Islamophobic. Morano said he found the posts "awful" and "vile," but argued Paladino was entitled to the same First Amendment protections as other Americans.

=== Oversight and constituent advocacy ===
In January 2026, Morano criticized the city's rollout of mandatory residential trash containers after delivery delays and reports that a contracted vendor struggled to fulfill orders. Speaking to the Staten Island Advance, Morano said he raised concerns with the Department of Sanitation and sought clarity on enforcement timing, refunds, and delivery status, particularly for residents who had paid without receiving bins.

Following winter storms in early 2026, Morano called for clearer inter-agency coordination on snow removal. Reporting in the Staten Island Advance said he urged the city to establish a "map of responsibility" identifying which agencies or entities are responsible for clearing snow at locations such as bus stops, park-and-ride facilities, and other areas where jurisdiction can be unclear.

=== Policy disputes with the Mamdani administration ===
In February 2026, Morano criticized Mayor Mamdani's proposed Fiscal Year 2027 preliminary budget, which included a potential property tax increase if alternative tax measures were not approved. In a video response reported by the Staten Island Advance, Morano questioned changing budget-gap projections and said shifting deficit figures could undermine public trust.

In February 2026, Morano criticized Mamdani's decision to discontinue plans to hire an additional 5,000 New York City Police Department officers, calling the move a "dangerous mistake," and argued that reducing planned hiring could weaken public safety.

In February 2026, after a major blizzard, Morano criticized the decision to reopen public schools for in-person learning in parts of Staten Island, citing low attendance and transportation and accessibility issues, including at special-needs schools. In a televised interview on Spectrum News NY1, Morano described the storm's impact on Staten Island as a "disaster" and again called for improved storm preparation and greater local autonomy for decisions such as shifting to remote learning.

In March 2026, Morano criticized Mamdani's rollout of a pilot program for free childcare for two-year-olds after Staten Island was excluded from the first phase. The Staten Island Advance reported that the initial program offered approximately 2,000 seats in five council districts outside Staten Island. Morano argued that Staten Island families were being overlooked and raised concerns about expanding the program before addressing staffing and compensation issues affecting teachers in existing early-childhood programs.

=== Legislative initiatives ===
During his first eight months in office, Morano was the primary sponsor of legislative proposals and resolutions addressing election reform, employment policy, public health, transportation, governance, and community recognition. In December 2025, Morano introduced legislation that would establish nonpartisan, ranked-choice elections for all municipal offices in New York City, including mayor, public advocate, borough president, and City Council. The Staten Island Advance reported that the change would require voter approval through a citywide referendum.

In April 2026, Morano introduced legislation (Intro. 0322-2026) that would grant New York City Council members the authority to appoint up to half of each community board's membership, with the remaining appointments continuing to be made by borough presidents. The proposal would require an amendment to the New York City Charter and approval by voters through a citywide referendum. Morano argued the change would make community boards more representative and accountable by distributing appointment power among multiple elected officials rather than concentrating it in a single office.

In August 2025, Morano joined fellow council members at a City Hall rally calling for passage of Intro. 0967, known as Ryder's Law, which would end New York City's horse-drawn carriage industry. Reporting in amNewYork, Morano was quoted saying, "The streets are no place for horses. We need to do something now."

In March 2026, Morano introduced legislation aimed at strengthening safety oversight and transparency requirements for Battery Energy Storage Systems (BESS) across New York City. The proposal would require operators of large battery storage facilities to provide the New York City Fire Department with real-time access to system data and mandate annual inspections by independent engineers not affiliated with the facility's owner or operator, with results submitted to city agencies and made publicly available. Morano said the legislation was intended to address safety concerns raised by residents and to ensure greater accountability as such facilities expand in residential areas.

Morano sponsored a bill that exempts disabled veterans from property taxes on their primary residence. The bill was passed by the council in November 2026.

== Electoral history ==
=== 2025 ===
2025 New York City Council special election, District 51
| Party | Candidate | Votes | % |
|---|---|---|---|
| SI Patriotism | Frank Morano | 5,649 | 58.9 |
| Common Ground | Clifford A. Hagen | 2,012 | 21.0 |
| We The People | Griffin T. Fossella | 1,897 | 19.8 |
| Write-in | | 33 | 0.3 |
| Total votes | | 9,591 | 100.0 |
| Republican hold | | | |

2025 New York City Council Republican primary, District 51
| Party | Candidate | Votes | % |
|---|---|---|---|
| Republican | Frank Morano (incumbent) | 3,317 | 81.9 |
| Republican | Griffin T. Fossella (withdrawn) | 377 | 9.3 |
| Republican | John K. Buthorn | 330 | 8.2 |
| Write-in | | 24 | 0.6 |
| Total votes | | 4,048 | 100.0 |

2025 New York City Council election, District 51
| Party | Candidate | Votes | % |
|---|---|---|---|
| Republican | Frank Morano | 42,624 | 72.3 |
| Conservative | Frank Morano | 2,840 | 4.8 |
| Total | Frank Morano (incumbent) | 45,464 | 77.1 |
| Democratic | Clifford A. Hagen | 12,374 | 21.0 |
| Patriot Workers | John K. Buthorn | 1,039 | 1.8 |
| Write-in | | 101 | 0.2 |
| Total votes | | 58,978 | 100.0 |
| Republican hold | | | |
