= Charles Fall =

American politician

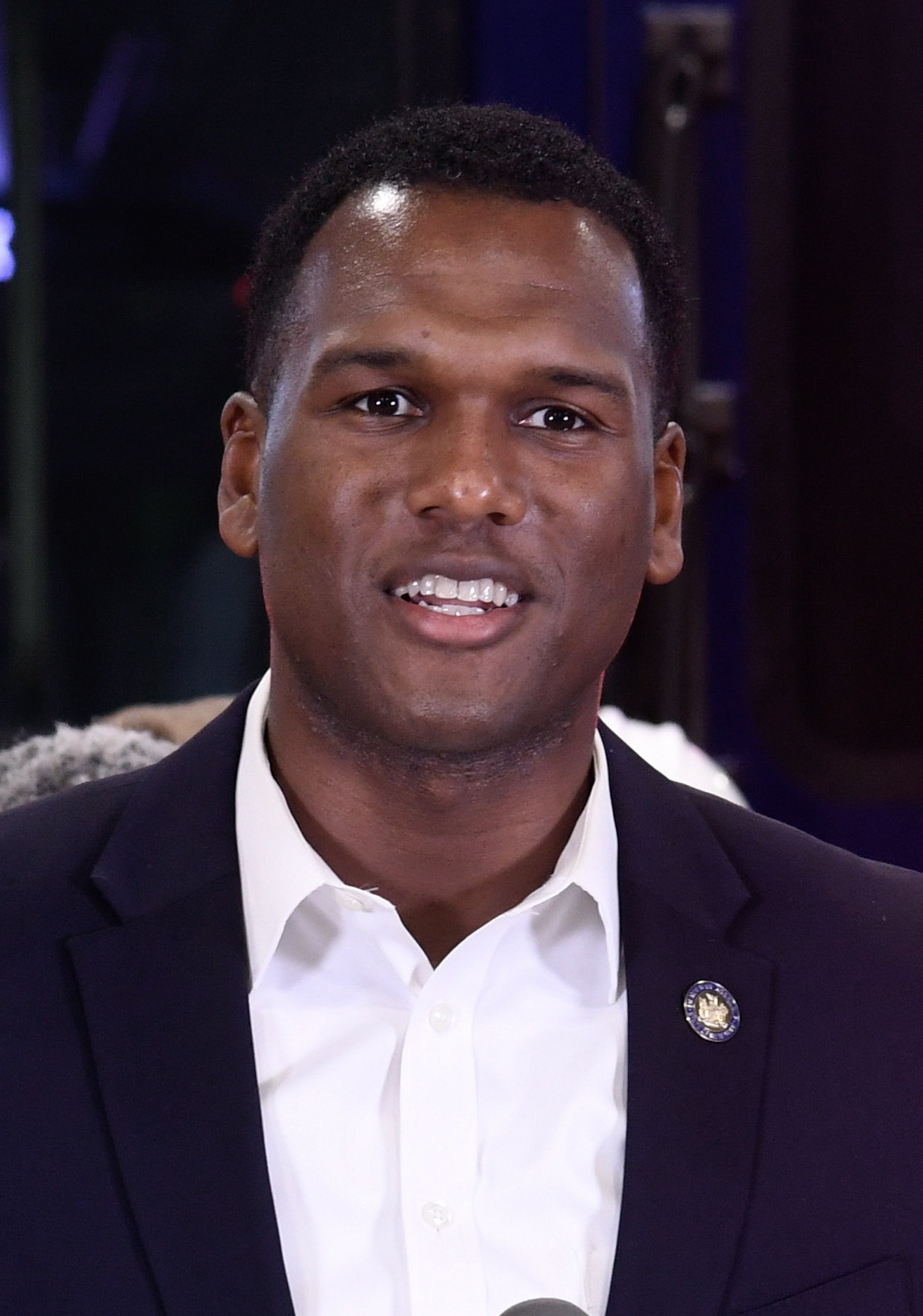

Chair of the Richmond County Democratic Committee
- Incumbent
- Assumed office October 1, 2025
- Preceded by: Laura Sword

Member of the New York State Assembly from the 61st district
- Incumbent
- Assumed office January 3, 2019
- Preceded by: Matthew Titone

Personal details
- Born: March 12, 1989 (age 37) Manhattan, New York, U.S.
- Party: Democratic
- Education: Southwestern College (BA); Pace University (MPA)
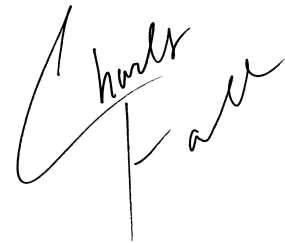
- Signature
- Website: State Assembly website

Charles Dialor Fall (born March 12, 1989) is an American politician serving as a member of the New York State Assembly, representing the 61st district since 2019. A Democrat, he has served as the Assembly's deputy majority leader since September 2025 Fall was elected the chair of the Staten Island Democratic Party in October 2025.

== Early life and education ==
Fall was born in Manhattan on March 12, 1989, and raised on Staten Island to parents who immigrated from Guinea in the 1980s. He previously served as the Staten Island borough director for Mayor of New York City Bill de Blasio, as well as the Chief of Staff to the New York City Parks Borough Commissioner for Staten Island. Fall has earned degrees from both Southwestern College and Pace University. He resides in Mariners Harbor.

== New York State Assembly ==
In 2018, Assemblyman Matthew Titone announced that he would not seek re-election. In a three-way primary, Fall won the Democratic nomination. He went on to win the general election easily and was sworn in for his first term on January 3, 2019.

== Electoral history ==
=== 2026 ===
2026 New York State Assembly election, District 61
Party	Candidate	Votes	%
Democratic	Charles Fall (incumbent)		
Republican	Casey O'Connor-Manasia		
Write-in			
Total votes			

=== 2024 ===
2024 New York State Assembly election, District 61
Party	Candidate	Votes	%
Democratic	Charles Fall (incumbent)	31,984	97.8
Write-in		704	2.2
Total votes		32,688	100.0
Democratic hold			

=== 2022 ===
2022 New York State Assembly Democratic primary, District 61
Party	Candidate	Votes	%
Democratic	Charles Fall (incumbent)	4,515	70.2
Democratic	Justine Cuccia	1,894	29.4
Write-in		26	0.4
Total votes		6,435	100.0

2022 New York State Assembly election, District 61
Party	Candidate	Votes	%
Democratic	Charles Fall (incumbent)	21,192	97.9
Write-in		459	2.1
Total votes		21,651	100.0
Democratic hold			

=== 2020 ===
2020 New York State Assembly election, District 61
Party	Candidate	Votes	%
Democratic	Charles Fall (incumbent)	32,185	67.3
Independence	Charles Fall (incumbent)	720	1.5
Total	Charles Fall (incumbent)	32,905	68.8
Republican	Paul Ciurcina Jr.	13,015	27.2
Conservative	Paul Ciurcina Jr.	1,855	3.9
Total	Paul Ciurcina Jr.	14,870	31.1
Write-in		55	0.1
Total votes		47,830	100.0
Democratic hold			

=== 2018 ===
2018 New York State Assembly Democratic primary, District 61
Party	Candidate	Votes	%
Democratic	Charles Fall	4,810	43.2
Democratic	Patricia Kane	3,224	28.9
Democratic	Bobby Digi Olisa	3,096	27.8
Write-in		12	0.1
Total votes		11,142	100.0

2018 New York State Assembly election, District 61
Party	Candidate	Votes	%
Democratic	Charles Fall	24,561	82.6
Reform	Charles Fall	425	1.4
Total	Charles Fall	24,986	84.0
Working Families	Patricia Kane	2,956	9.9
Green	Daniel Falcone	1,672	5.6
Write-in		130	0.4
Total votes		29,744	100.0
Democratic hold			
