= Stephen Fiala =

American politician (born 1967)

Stephen J. Fiala

Member of the New York City Council from the 51st district
- In office January 1, 1998 – December 31, 2001
- Preceded by: Vito Fossella
- Succeeded by: Andrew Lanza

Personal details
- Born: 1967 (age 58–59)
- Party: Republican
- Profession: Politician

Stephen J. Fiala (born 1967) is a Republican Party lawmaker from the New York City Borough of Staten Island.

Appointed by former New York Governor George Pataki to become County Clerk of Richmond County, New York in 2001, he had previously served in the New York City Council.

== Electoral history ==
=== 1997 ===
1997 New York City Council election, District 51
Party	Candidate	Votes	%
Republican	Stephen Fiala	18,875	54.8
Tax Cut Now	Stephen Fiala	146	0.4
Total	Stephen Fiala	19,021	55.3
Democratic	Anthony J. Pocchia	11,379	33.1
Independence	Anthony J. Pocchia	675	2.0
Total	Anthony J. Pocchia	12,054	35.0
Conservative	Mary Lou Shanahan	2,366	6.9
Right to Life	Marietta A. Canning	657	1.9
Green	Henry J. Bardel	329	1.0
Total votes		34,427	100.0
Republican hold			

=== 1996 ===
1996 New York State Assembly election, District 59
Party	Candidate	Votes	%
Democratic	Elizabeth Connelly (incumbent)	20,807	69.8
Republican	Stephen Fiala	6,767	22.7
Conservative	Stephen Fiala	1,418	4.8
Tax Cut Now	Stephen Fiala	209	0.7
Total	Stephen Fiala	8,394	28.2
Independence	Caroline A. Cutroneo	603	2.0
Total votes		29,804	100.0
Democratic hold			

Political offices
Preceded by Vito Fossella	Member of the New York City Council from the 51st district 1998–2001	Succeeded by Andrew Lanza
