= Matthew Titone =

American politician

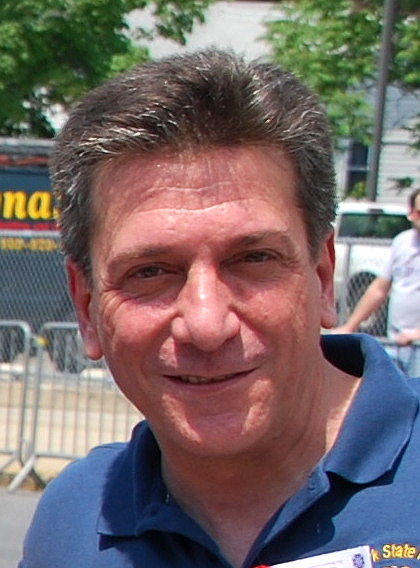

Surrogate of Richmond County
- Incumbent
- Assumed office January 1, 2019
- Preceded by: Robert Gigante

Member of the New York State Assembly from the 61st district
- In office April 1, 2007 – January 1, 2019
- Preceded by: John W. Lavelle
- Succeeded by: Charles Fall

Personal details
- Born: January 24, 1961 (age 65) Staten Island, New York
- Party: Democratic
- Spouse: Giosue Pugliese
- Education: St. John's University School of Law
- Profession: lawyer, politician

Matthew J. Titone (born January 24, 1961) is an American politician and lawyer from Staten Island, New York. A Democrat, he served as a member of the New York State Assembly from the 61st District, on Staten Island's North Shore from April 1, 2007 to January 1, 2019. Titone currently serves as a surrogate court judge of Richmond County. He was the second openly gay man to be elected to the State Assembly.

== Early life, education, career ==
Titone was born on Staten Island, the son of Vito J. Titone, a former judge of the New York State Court of Appeals. Titone was raised in the Grymes Hill and West Brighton neighborhoods. He went on to attend St. John's University School of Law, while working full-time as a law clerk for the late John S. Zachary.

After being admitted to the New York State Bar Association in 1992, Titone worked pro bono for the Staten Island AIDS Task Force and Project Hospitality. In 1993, he joined the Wall Street law firm of Morgan, Melhuish, Monahan, Arvidson, Abrutyn & Lisowski, where he was a senior trial associate and managed the firm's labor law litigation department. In 1998, he established a private law practice on Staten Island.

Titone garnered national attention when he took on the New York State adoption industry representing a family who adopted a baby boy. The family was never informed by the adoption agency that the child was born with the AIDS virus and resulted in the child being untreated for his illness for eleven years after the adoption was completed. Not only did Titone provide legal support and guidance for the family, he also helped the young man establish the Justin LiGreci HIV/AIDS Foundation for Children and Teens, a not for profit organization that provides educational services to the youth of Staten Island and New York metropolitan area.

== Political career ==
Titone was the Democratic nominee for the New York State Senate in 2006, losing the 24th District race to Republican Andrew Lanza.

Following the death of Assemblyman John Lavelle in January 2007, Titone was selected as the Democratic nominee for the special election held to fill the vacancy. On the third ballot of Democratic committeemembers, Daniel Lavelle, son of the late Assemblymember, dropped out and Titone was unopposed. Titone was backed by City Councilman Mike McMahon, whose support was crucial. Mimi Cusick, mother of assembly member Mike Cusick and "mother of the party", also endorsed Titone's candidacy.

In the election held on March 27, 2007, Titone received 49% of the vote in a three-way contest to succeed Lavelle, comfortably defeating his Republican and Independence party opponents who won 32% and 19% respectively.

=== 2018 Richmond County Surrogate election ===
In March 2018, Titone announced that he would vacate his Assembly seat that fall to seek election as Richmond County (Staten Island) Surrogate. Titone’s announcement was quickly followed by endorsements from Diane Savino, Michael Cusick, Debi Rose, and former Conservative Party Staten Island Borough President James Molinaro.

== Personal life ==
Titone is openly gay and married his partner of 18 years, Giosue Pugliese, in a ceremony at Staten Island Borough Hall in September 2011, shortly after same-sex marriage was legalized in New York State. He was one of five LGBT members of the New York Legislature, alongside Assemblymembers Deborah Glick, Daniel O'Donnell, and Harry Bronson, as well as Senator Brad Hoylman. His Assembly campaigns have won the support of the Gay & Lesbian Victory Fund, which provides financial and strategic assistance. He is the first openly gay man elected to higher office on Staten Island.

== Electoral history ==
=== 2006 ===
2006 New York's 24th State Senate district election
Party	Candidate	Votes	%	±%
Republican	Andrew Lanza	31,851	53.48%	▼4.94%
Independence	Andrew Lanza	2,309	3.88%	▲2.36%
Total	Andrew Lanza	34,160	57.36%	▼2.58%
Democratic	Matthew Titone	21,737	36.50%	▲1.58%
Working Families	Matthew Titone	1,337	2.25%	New
Total	Matthew Titone	23,074	38.75%	▲1.58%
Conservative	Charles T. Pistor Jr.	2,307	3.87%	▼1.26%
Write-in		12	0.02%	▲0.01%
Total votes		59,553	100.00%	N/A
Republican hold		Swing	▼6.52%	

=== 2007 ===
2007 New York's 61st State Assembly district special election
Party	Candidate	Votes	%	±%
Democratic	Matthew Titone	2,802	45.23%	▼22.32%
Working Families	Matthew Titone	286	4.62%	▼0.46%
Total	Matthew Titone	3,088	49.85%	▼22.78%
Republican	Rose Margarella	1,460	23.57%	▼3.74%
Conservative	Rose Margarella	474	7.65%	New
Total	Rose Margarella	1,934	31.22%	▼3.74%
Independence	Kelvin Alexander	1,160	18.72%	New
Write-in		13	0.21%	▲0.15%
Total votes		6,195	100.00%	N/A
Democratic hold		Swing	▼18.58%	

=== 2008 ===
2008 New York's 61st State Assembly district election
Party	Candidate	Votes	%	±%
Democratic	Matthew Titone	24,698	69.49%	▲24.26%
Working Families	Matthew Titone	1,276	3.59%	▼1.03%
Total	Matthew Titone (incumbent)	25,974	73.08%	▲23.23%
Republican	Thomas W. Mcginley	8,578	24.13%	▲0.56%
Independence	Rose Margarella	985	2.77%	▼15.95%
Write-in		5	0.01%	▼0.20%
Total votes		35,542	100.00%	N/A
Democratic hold		Swing	▲21.79%	

=== 2010 ===
2010 New York's 61st State Assembly district election
Party	Candidate	Votes	%	±%
Democratic	Matthew Titone	15,806	73.64%	▲4.15%
Independence	Matthew Titone	2,723	12.69%	▲9.92%
Working Families	Matthew Titone	1,352	6.30%	▲2.71%
Total	Matthew Titone (incumbent)	19,881	92.62%	▲16.78%
Libertarian	Dave Narby	1,494	6.96%	New
Write-in		89	0.41%	▲0.40%
Total votes		21,464	100.00%	N/A
Democratic hold		Swing	▲21.33%	

=== 2012 ===
2012 New York's 61st State Assembly district Independence primary election
Party	Candidate	Votes	%
Independence	Matthew Titone (incumbent)	50	58.82%
Independence	Paul D. Saryian	35	41.18%
Total votes		85	100.00%

2012 New York's 61st State Assembly district election
Party	Candidate	Votes	%	±%
Democratic	Matthew Titone	26,541	74.03%	▲0.39%
Working Families	Matthew Titone	1,340	3.74%	▼2.56%
Independence	Matthew Titone	735	2.05%	▼10.64%
Total	Matthew Titone (incumbent)	28,616	79.81%	▼12.81%
Republican	Paul D. Saryian	7,204	20.09%	New
Write-in		33	0.09%	▼0.32%
Total votes		35,853	100.00%	N/A
Democratic hold		Swing	▼13.02%	

=== 2014 ===
2014 New York's 61st State Assembly district election
Party	Candidate	Votes	%	±%
Democratic	Matthew Titone	13,633	82.03%	▲8.00%
Independence	Matthew Titone	1,408	8.47%	▲6.42%
Working Families	Matthew Titone	1,388	8.35%	▲4.61%
Total	Matthew Titone (incumbent)	16,429	98.86%	▲19.05%
Write-in		190	1.14%	▲1.05%
Total votes		16,619	100.00%	N/A
Democratic hold		Swing	▲26.95%	

=== 2016 ===
2016 New York's 61st State Assembly district election
Party	Candidate	Votes	%	±%
Democratic	Matthew Titone (incumbent)	31,750	99.23%	▲17.20%
Write-in		245	0.77%	▼0.37%
Total votes		31,995	100.00%	N/A
Democratic hold		Swing	▲17.57%	

=== 2018 ===
2018 Richmond County Surrogate Democratic primary election
Party	Candidate	Votes	%
Democratic	Matthew Titone	13,456	55.34%
Democratic	Anthony Catalano	10,726	44.11%
Write-in		133	0.55%
Total votes		24,315	100.00%

2018 Richmond County Surrogate election
Party	Candidate	Votes	%	±%
Democratic	Matthew Titone	69,506	50.96%	▲7.50%
Republican	Ronald Castorina	59,810	43.85%	▲3.28%
Conservative	Ronald Castorina	6,060	4.44%	▼6.92%
Reform	Ronald Castorina	881	0.65%	New
Total	Ronald Castorina	66,751	48.94%	▼3.73%
Write-in		140	0.10%	▼0.67%
Total votes		136,397	100.00%	N/A
Democratic hold		Swing	▲4.22%	

== See also ==
- LGBT culture in New York City
- LGBT rights in New York
- List of LGBT people from New York City
- NYC Pride March

New York State Assembly
Preceded by John Lavelle	New York State Assembly, 61st District; 2007–2018	Succeeded by Charles Fall
