= Vito Fossella =

American politician (born 1965)

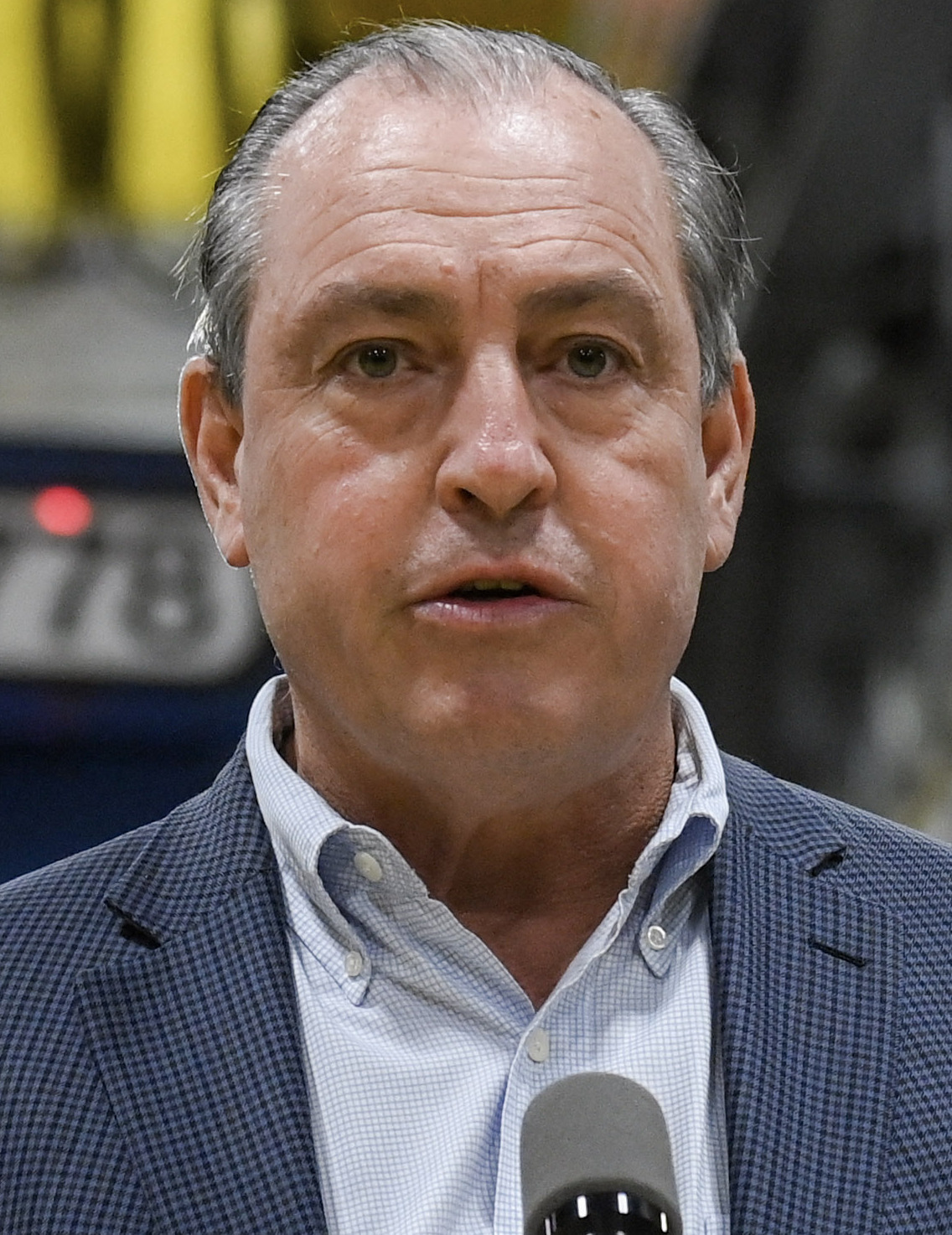
- Fossella in 2022

16th Borough President of Staten Island
- Incumbent
- Assumed office January 1, 2022
- Preceded by: James Oddo

Member of the U.S. House of Representatives from New York's 13th district
- In office November 4, 1997 – January 3, 2009 (Note: Fossella's official service begins on the date of the special election, while he was not sworn in until November 5, 1997.)
- Preceded by: Susan Molinari
- Succeeded by: Michael McMahon

Member of the New York City Council from the 51st district
- In office April 27, 1994 – November 4, 1997
- Preceded by: Alfred Cerullo
- Succeeded by: Stephen Fiala

Personal details
- Born: Vito John Fossella Jr. March 9, 1965 (age 61) New York City, New York, U.S.
- Party: Democratic (before 1990); Republican (1990–present)
- Spouse: Mary Rowan (m. 1990)
- Children: 4
- Relatives: James A. O'Leary (great-grandfather); Frank Fossella (uncle)
- Education: Iona University (attended); University of Pennsylvania (BS); Fordham University (JD)

Vito John Fossella Jr. (born March 9, 1965) is an American politician serving as the Staten Island Borough President since 2022. A member of the Republican Party, Fossella previously represented the state's 13th congressional district in the U.S. House of Representatives for six terms, from 1997 to 2009 serving as the lone Republican from New York City. A Staten Island native, Fossella initially took office in 1997 after winning a special election held to replace the resigning Susan Molinari.

While in Congress, Fossella cosponsored the SAFE Port Act along with bills that funded Staten Island-area infrastructure.

After a DUI arrest in Alexandria, Virginia, in 2008, it was discovered that he was carrying out an extramarital affair resulting in a child. After his arrest, he decided not to run for re-election to Congress. In November 2021, Fosella was elected borough president of Staten Island.

== Early life, education, and family ==
Fossella was born on Staten Island into a Roman Catholic family of Irish and Italian descent. Fossella's great-grandfather James A. O'Leary represented Staten Island in Congress from 1935 to 1944. One of his uncles, Frank Fossella, was a prominent Staten Island Democrat who was a City Council member in 1985. His father, Vito John Fossella Sr., served in various appointed positions in the city administrations of Democratic Mayors Ed Koch and Abraham Beame, then became a successful construction engineer.

Fossella, the fourth of seven children, was a basketball player at Monsignor Farrell High School, where he got his first political experience in the student council. He briefly played violin and percussion with the Christian pop band Sonseed. He attended Iona College in New Rochelle, then transferred to the Wharton School of the University of Pennsylvania, where he received a Bachelor of Science degree in economics in 1987. At Penn, he was a member of the Sigma Phi Epsilon fraternity.

After college, Fossella worked as a management consultant at the accounting firm Deloitte & Touche. Deloitte Touche Tohmatsu was the second largest campaign contributor to Fossella in the 2006 campaign cycle and among the largest contributors in the 2008 campaign cycle.

Fossella then attended law school. He received a Juris Doctor from the Fordham University School of Law in 1993 and worked as an associate at a medical malpractice defense law firm Schiavetti Begos & Nicholson.

In 1990, Fossella married Mary Patricia Rowan. They have three children and live in the Great Kills neighborhood on Staten Island. Fossella also had a daughter out-of-wedlock in 2005 with retired U.S. Air Force Lt. Col. Laura Fay. His son Griffin ran in a 2025 special election for the New York City Council in the 51st district, placing third behind Frank Morano and Cliff Hagen.

== New York City Council ==
=== Early political work; election ===
Fossella was a political protégé of Michael J. Petrides, a city school board member and a Staten Island political strategist. In 1990, Fossella changed his voter registration from the Democratic Party to become the family's first Republican. "I found myself voting more and more for Republicans," he said in 1997. "For the most part, my family reacted well. But still, I would love to have been a fly on the wall." Under Petrides' guidance, he joined the 1992 re-election campaign of Staten Island Congresswoman Susan Molinari and, in 1993, the mayoral campaign of Rudy Giuliani.

Fossella's political career began in April 1994, when he won a special election to the New York City Council, representing Staten Island's South Shore and Mid-Island section. He replaced Councilman Alfred C. Cerullo III, who had left to become Commissioner of Consumer Affairs in the Rudy Giuliani administration. Fossella spent $92,000 in the election, in which he had five opponents.

In November 1994, Fossella was reelected to the remaining three years of Cerullo's term, defeating Democrat Rosemarie Mangano. He served on the Council until November 1997.

=== Council initiatives ===
Fossella's council initiatives included:

- Authoring the legislation that led to the agreement to close the Fresh Kills Landfill permanently
- Conceiving the idea of the South Richmond Rezoning Study, a comprehensive rezoning initiative on Staten Island
- Securing funding for constructing P.S. 56 and P.S. 6, the first new schools built on Staten Island in over a decade.

== United States Congress ==
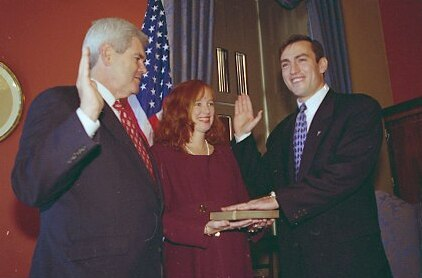
Fossella is sworn in as a member of the House by Newt Gingrich in 1997

=== Initial election ===
In June 1997, Fossella was selected by executive committee of the Staten Island Republican Party as its candidate to run for the Congressional seat being vacated by Representative Susan Molinari. Fossella won the special election in November 1997, defeating Democratic Assemblyman Eric Vitaliano with 61 percent of the vote.

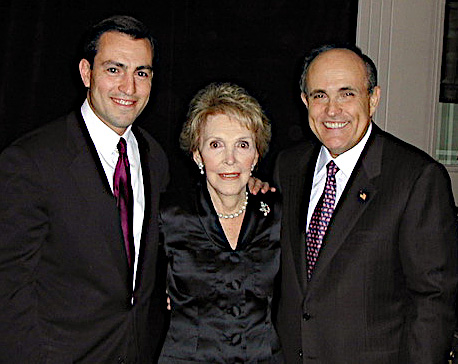
Vito Fossella, Nancy Reagan, and Rudy Giuliani in 2002.

=== Re-elections ===
In November 1998, Fossella won a full term with 68 percent of the vote. He was reelected in 2000, winning 65 percent of the vote against Democrat Katina M. Johnstone even as Al Gore carried the district. In 2002, he was reelected with 70 percent of the vote, defeating Democrat Arne M. Mattsson.

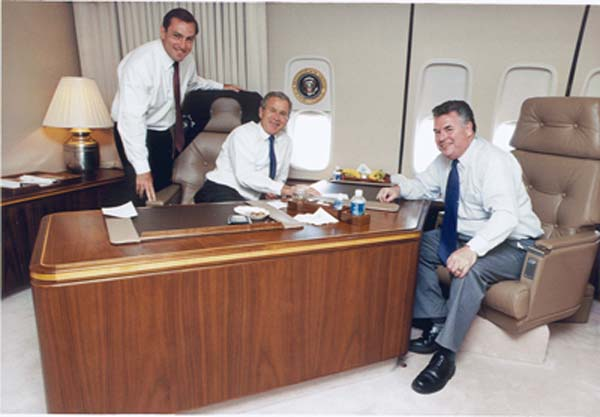
Fossella with President George W. Bush and Peter King in 2004.

In 2004, Fossella faced his first close contest against former state assemblyman and judge Frank J. Barbaro. Barbaro won the Brooklyn portion of the district by seven points, the first time Fossella had not won that area; Barbaro had represented much of this area in Albany for 23 years. However, Barbaro performed poorly on Staten Island, and Fossella won by 26 points—enough to win a fourth full term with 59% of the vote districtwide. Some have speculated that he was helped by George W. Bush's 13-point win on Staten Island.

Fossella was considered a possible challenger to Mayor Michael Bloomberg in the 2005 election, but he chose not to make the race.

In 2006, incumbent Fossella defeated Democrat Steve Harrison, a relatively unknown Brooklyn attorney, by a margin of 56.7–43.3%.

=== Family scandal and congressional retirement ===
Before Fossella announced that he would not run in 2008, he was included in the National Republican Congressional Committee's list of Republican candidates who qualified for fundraising help because they were considered particularly vulnerable.

Steve Harrison hoped to run against Fossella again in the 2008 election, but New York City Council member Domenic Recchia also began seeking the Democratic nomination.

Fossella became mired in controversy in May 2008 after beign arrested in Alexandria, Virginia for driving under the influence. Details of his arrest led to the revelation that Fossella, a self-proclaimed "family values" politician, had kept a secret second family in Washington, D.C., including a three-year old child that he had fathered out-of-wedlock. Fossella initially indicated that he might run for re-election despite these revelations. On May 20, however, he dropped out of the race. Fossella was succeeded by Democrat Michael McMahon.

=== Committee assignments ===
- Committee on Energy and Commerce
  - Subcommittee on Commerce, Trade, and Consumer Protection
  - Subcommittee on Environment and Hazardous Materials
  - Subcommittee on Telecommunications and the Internet

=== Political positions ===
In August 2002, appearing on CNN's Crossfire, Fossella argued for partly privatizing Social Security and allowing some of the funds to be placed on Wall Street investments. He said, "I happen to think the President is on the right side of history here. And I think the more you empower American people, the more you give them the opportunity to invest on their own and being in control of their own destiny and their own retirement, the better off we'll be."

In June 2003, Fossella wrote an op-ed for The Washington Times, in which he said, "The claims that progress is too slow, the situation unstable and the United States lacks the expertise to get the job done does not reflect reality on the ground in Baghdad, Kirkuk and beyond. Indeed, the critics who complain that the seeds of democracy will not take root in the sands of a desert where tyranny ruled are as wrong today as the pessimists were in 1945." The final sentence of the column was, "The United States will fulfill its commitment to Iraq, and then we will depart, having liberated a nation, freed a people and established a democracy of the people, by the people and for the people." In August 2006, Fossella said that leaving Iraq now would "do a disservice to the noble sacrifice that the troops have made on behalf of our national security."

Fossella voted for the Marriage Protection Act in 2004 and for the Federal Marriage Amendment in 2004 and 2006, all of which would nationally define marriage as between a man and a woman. In 2007, Fossella voted for the Employment Non-Discrimination Act, a bill nationally prohibiting job discrimination based on sexual orientation.

In 2005, Fossella spoke out against the Bush Administration's handling of appropriating Homeland Security funds.

After the 2007 State of the Union Address, Fossella crossed the aisle to join with Senator Hillary Clinton in 2007 to raise awareness of health issues suffered by those who worked at the World Trade Center site on and after 9/11. Fossella said, "We have made progress over the last year to begin getting the resources necessary to help our 9/11 heroes. However, we now need a significant investment by the federal government into health monitoring and treatment for those who are sick or injured. In addition, the federal government must develop a comprehensive plan to address the health impacts of 9/11. We continue urging the White House to provide adequate funding in the 2008 budget to help all those who are sick or injured as a result of the terror attacks."

=== Legislative initiatives ===
In Congress, Fossella was the lead sponsor of seven bills signed into law. He also cosponsored nearly 110 bills that became law, including the SAFE Port Act.

Fossella's legislative initiatives while in Congress included the following:

- Return over $700 million to individual investors by eliminating fees by the SEC with the Investor and Capital Markets Fee Relief Act. The Act was signed into law by President Bush on January 16, 2002.
- Help repair the 86th Street subway station in the Bay Ridge area of Brooklyn. This station serves as a transfer point where passengers connect to bus service to Staten Island over the Verrazzano Bridge.

== Staten Island Borough President ==
In March 2021, Fossella announced that he was running for Borough President of Staten Island. He was endorsed by Donald Trump and won the Republican nomination in July 2021. He was elected borough president after defeating opponents Mark Murphy and Leticia Remauro. Fosella won the November general election. He took office in January 2022. He was reelected in November 2025.

== Electoral history ==
=== 2025 ===
2025 Staten Island borough president election
Party	Candidate	Votes	%
Republican	Vito Fossella (incumbent)	98,168	67.8
Democratic	Michael T. Colombo	46,369	32.0
Write-in		259	0.2
Total votes		144,796	100.0
Republican hold			

=== 2021 ===
2021 Staten Island borough president Republican primary
Party	Candidate	Maximum round	Maximum votes	Share in maximum round	Maximum votes First round votes Transfer votes
Republican	Vito Fossella	3	9,461	51.2%	
Republican	Steven Matteo	3	9,018	48.8%	
Republican	Leticia Remauro	2	2,487	12.7%	
Republican	Jhong U. Kim	2	556	2.8%	
Write-In		1	151	0.8%	

2021 Staten Island borough president election
Party	Candidate	Votes	%
Republican	Vito Fossella	63,331	60.1
Democratic	Mark S. Murphy	32,528	30.9
Staten Island 1st	Mark S. Murphy	1,494	1.4
Total	Mark S. Murphy	34,022	32.3
Conservative	Leticia Remauro	7,892	7.5
Write-in		179	0.2
Total votes		105,424	100.0
Republican hold			

=== 2006 ===
2006 United States House of Representatives Independence primary in New York, District 13
Party	Candidate	Votes	%
Independence	Vito Fossella (incumbent)	241	59.4
Independence	Anita Lerman	163	40.1
Write-in		2	0.5
Total votes		406	100.0

2006 United States House of Representatives election in New York, District 13
Party	Candidate	Votes	%
Republican	Vito Fossella (incumbent)	49,818	47.7
Conservative	Vito Fossella (incumbent)	5,849	5.6
Independence	Vito Fossella (incumbent)	3,667	3.5
Total	Vito Fossella (incumbent)	59,334	56.8
Democratic	Stephen A. Harrison	42,229	40.4
Working Families	Stephen A. Harrison	2,902	2.8
Total	Stephen A. Harrison	45,131	43.2
Total votes		104,465	100.0
Republican hold			

=== 2004 ===
2004 United States House of Representatives election in New York, District 13
Party	Candidate	Votes	%
Republican	Vito Fossella (incumbent)	102,713	53.7
Conservative	Vito Fossella (incumbent)	10,221	5.3
Total	Vito Fossella (incumbent)	112,934	59.0
Democratic	Frank J. Barbaro	72,180	37.7
Working Families	Frank J. Barbaro	3,657	1.9
Independence	Frank J. Barbaro	2,663	1.4
Total	Frank J. Barbaro	78,500	41.0
Total votes		191,434	100.0
Republican hold			

=== 2002 ===
2002 United States House of Representatives election in New York, District 13
Party	Candidate	Votes	%
Republican	Vito Fossella (incumbent)	62,520	60.3
Conservative	Vito Fossella (incumbent)	7,166	6.9
Right to Life	Vito Fossella (incumbent)	2,518	2.4
Total	Vito Fossella (incumbent)	72,204	69.6
Democratic	Arne M. Mattsson	27,304	26.3
Working Families	Arne M. Mattsson	1,271	1.2
Liberal	Arne M. Mattsson	791	0.8
Total	Arne M. Mattsson	29,366	28.3
Independence	Anita Lerman	1,427	1.4
Green	Henry J. Bardel	696	0.7
Total votes		103,693	100.0
Republican hold			

=== 2000 ===
2000 United States House of Representatives election in New York, District 13
Party	Candidate	Votes	%
Republican	Vito Fossella (incumbent)	95,696	56.3
Conservative	Vito Fossella (incumbent)	9,295	5.5
Right to Life	Vito Fossella (incumbent)	4,815	2.8
Total	Vito Fossella (incumbent)	109,806	64.6
Democratic	Katina M. Johnstone	55,763	32.8
Working Families	Katina M. Johnstone	1,840	1.1
Total	Katina M. Johnstone	57,603	33.9
Green	Anita Lerman	1,351	0.8
Independence	Anita Lerman	1,302	0.8
Total	Anita Lerman	2,653	1.6
Total votes		170,062	100.0
Republican hold			

=== 1998 ===
1998 United States House of Representatives election in New York, District 13
Party	Candidate	Votes	%
Republican	Vito Fossella (incumbent)	60,550	51.5
Conservative	Vito Fossella (incumbent)	11,707	10.0
Right to Life	Vito Fossella (incumbent)	3,881	3.3
Total	Vito Fossella (incumbent)	76,138	64.8
Democratic	Eugene V. Prisco	39,153	33.3
Liberal	Eugene V. Prisco	1,014	0.9
Total	Eugene V. Prisco	40,167	34.2
Independence	Anita Lerman	1,245	1.1
Total votes		117,550	100.0
Republican hold			

=== 1997 ===
1997 United States House of Representatives special election in New York, District 13
Party	Candidate	Votes	%
Republican	Vito Fossella	68,861	52.9
Conservative	Vito Fossella	5,924	4.5
Right to Life	Vito Fossella	3,381	2.6
Independence	Vito Fossella	1,672	1.3
Total	Vito Fossella	79,838	61.3
Democratic	Eric N. Vitaliano	50,373	38.7
Total votes		130,211	100.0
Republican hold			

=== 1994 ===
April 1994 New York City Council special election, District 51
Party	Candidate	Votes	%
Staten Island Preferred	Vito Fossella	4,279	47.3
Staten Island Works	Anthony J. Pocchia	1,895	21.0
Spirit of Secession	CaraMia Hart	1,474	16.3
Conservative	Jayne Gastaldo	684	7.6
Activist People	John LaFemina	403	4.5
Public Service	Dorothy Landau-Crawford	303	3.4
Total votes		9,038	100.0
Republican hold			

November 1994 New York City Council special election, District 51
Party	Candidate	Votes	%
Republican	Vito Fossella (incumbent)	22,273	60.0
Conservative	Vito Fossella (incumbent)	4,125	11.1
Total	Vito Fossella (incumbent)	26,398	71.1
Democratic	Rosemarie Mangano	9,542	25.7
Right to Life	James C. Howarth	1,154	3.1
Total votes		37,094	100.0
Republican hold			

== See also ==
- List of federal political sex scandals in the United States

U.S. House of Representatives
Preceded by Susan Molinari	Member of the U.S. House of Representatives from New York's 13th congressional district 1997–2009	Succeeded by Michael McMahon
Political offices
Preceded by James Oddo	Borough President of Staten Island; 2022–present	Incumbent
U.S. order of precedence (ceremonial)
Preceded by Sue W. Kelly as Former U.S. Representative	Order of precedence of the United States as Former U.S. Representative	Succeeded by Anthony Weiner as Former U.S. Representative
