= 2006 New York state elections =

- November 7, 2006

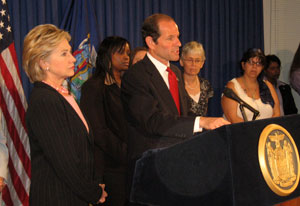
2006 Democratic candidates Eliot Spitzer for Governor of New York and Hillary Clinton for US Senator.

New York state held various elections on November 7, 2006. Most notably, elections were held for the state governor, attorney general, comptroller, and for the U.S. Senate, all of which saw Democrats win and build on their existing majority. While Democrats had already been a strong force in the New York City area, most of the Democratic gains in 2006 occurred upstate. Former Attorney General Eliot Spitzer won the 2006 gubernatorial election by a record margin, while Andrew Cuomo replaced him as the new attorney general. Alan Hevesi was re-elected as comptroller, despite mounting ethics concerns. Hillary Clinton was re-elected to the Senate. For the first time in over 50 years, all major statewide elected offices were held by one party. For the first time in over 60 years, they were all held by Democrats.

Hevesi resigned as comptroller in late 2006, and Spitzer resigned from the governorship in 2008.

== Background ==
The previous governor, George Pataki, was a Republican who defeated incumbent Democrat Mario Cuomo in 1994 and was re-elected twice by wide margins, leading to a total of 12 consecutive years in the role. Republican Senator Alfonse D'Amato served until he was defeated in 1998, and before him, long-time Senator Jacob Javits also served as a Republican, although he ran as a Liberal in 1980.

== Federal offices ==
=== United States Senate ===
Democratic Senator Hillary Clinton was re-elected to a second 6-year term.

=== United States House of Representatives ===
Democrats flipped three Republican-held congressional seats, all in Upstate New York. Democrat Michael Arcuri won the open seat of retiring Republican Sherwood Boehlert in the 24th Congressional District, which stretches across Central New York from Utica to Oneonta to the Finger Lakes. Democrat Kirsten Gillibrand defeated Republican incumbent John Sweeney in the 20th Congressional District, which includes Saratoga Springs and Glens Falls and takes in most of the upper Hudson Valley. Democrat John Hall defeated Republican incumbent Sue Kelly in the 19th Congressional district in the Lower Hudson Valley outside New York City.

== State offices ==
=== Governor ===
Eliot Spitzer, a Democrat, was elected to replace retiring George Pataki, a Republican.

=== Attorney General ===
Andrew Cuomo was elected to replace fellow Democrat Eliot Spitzer, who was elected governor.

=== Comptroller ===
Democratic Comptroller Alan Hevesi was re-elected.

=== State Senate ===
Republicans kept control of the State Senate, but lost the seat of Republican Nicholas Spano in Westchester County.

=== State Assembly ===
Democrats also gained three seats to build on their supermajority in the State Assembly.

=== Later developments ===
On December 23, 2006, Hevesi pleaded guilty to defrauding the government and immediately resigned as comptroller. His guilty plea arose from his use of state employees to assist his wife.

Spitzer announced his resignation as governor on March 11, 2008 due to his involvement in a prostitution ring.

== See also ==
- 2006 New York gubernatorial election
- 2006 United States Senate election in New York
- 2006 United States House of Representatives elections in New York
- New York state elections
