= 1997 United States House of Representatives elections =

1997 U.S. House of Representatives elections
- April 12, 1997 – November 5, 1997

3 (out of 435) seats in the U.S. House of Representatives 218 seats needed for a majority
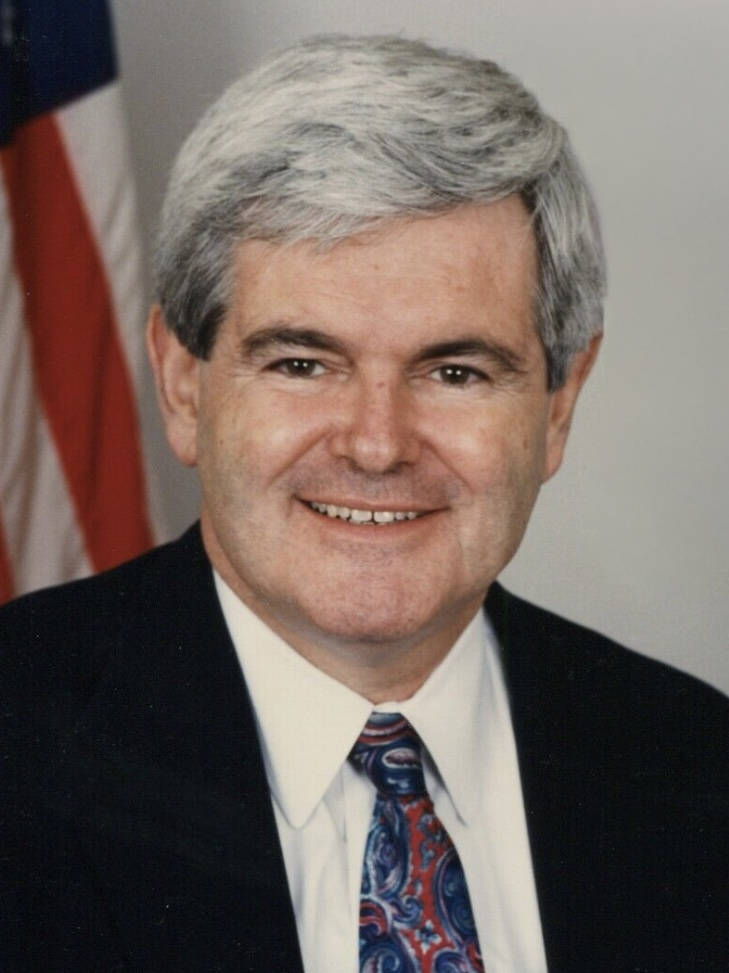

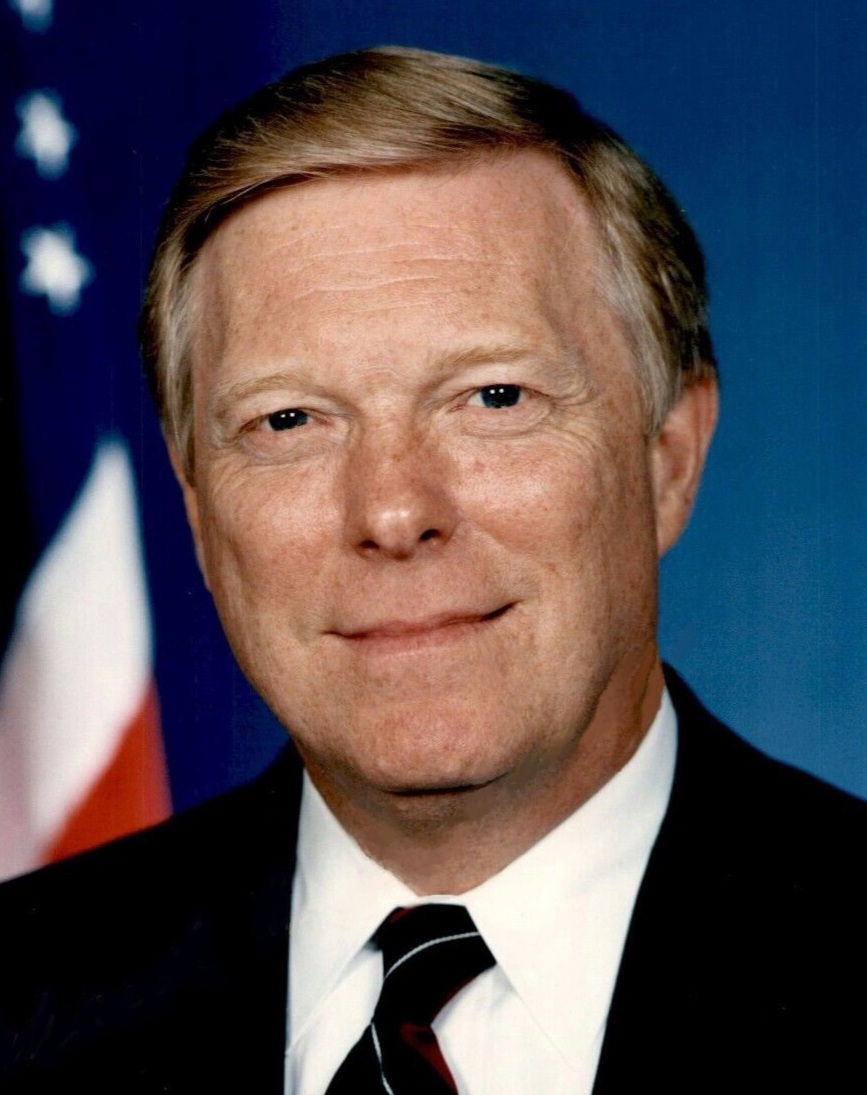
	Majority party	Minority party
Leader	Newt Gingrich	Dick Gephardt
Party	Republican	Democratic
Leader since	March 20, 1989	June 6, 1989
Leader's seat	Georgia 6th	Missouri 3rd
Last election	226 seats	207 seats
Seats won	2	1
Seat change	▲1	▼1

There were three special elections to the United States House of Representatives in 1997 during the 105th United States Congress. Republicans had a net one-seat gain over the Democrats.

== Summary ==
Elections are listed by date and district.

District	Incumbent			This race	
District	Member	Party	First elected	Results	Candidates
Texas 28	Frank Tejeda	Democratic	1992	Incumbent died January 30, 1997. New member elected April 12, 1997. Democratic hold.	▌ ✓ Ciro Rodriguez (Democratic) 66.68%; ▌Juan F. Solis III (Democratic) 33.32%
New Mexico 3	Bill Richardson	Democratic	1982	Incumbent resigned February 13, 1997 to become U.S. Ambassador to the United Nations. New member elected May 13, 1997. Republican gain.	▌ ✓ Bill Redmond (Republican) 42.75%; ▌Eric P. Serna (Democratic) 39.79%; ▌Carol Miller (Green) 16.78%; ▌Ed Nagel (Libertarian) 0.39%; ▌Daniel Pearlman (Reform) 0.30%
New York 13	Susan Molinari	Republican	1990 (Special)	Incumbent resigned August 2, 1997, to become a journalist for CBS. New member elected November 5, 1997. Republican hold.	▌ ✓ Vito Fossella (Republican) 61.31%; ▌Eric N. Vitaliano (Democratic) 38.69%

== New Mexico's 3rd district ==
The election was held in the historically Democratic district after the resignation of Democrat Bill Richardson, who became the United States Ambassador to the United Nations. Bill Redmond won the May 13 election and became the only Republican to ever represent this district.

New Mexico's 3rd congressional district special election, 1997
Party	Candidate	Votes	%
Republican	Bill Redmond	43,559	42.75
Democratic	Eric P. Serna	40,542	39.79
Green	Carol Miller	17,101	16.78
Libertarian	Ed Nagel	393	0.39
Reform	Daniel Pearlman	304	0.30
Total votes		101,899	100%
Republican gain from Democratic			

== Texas's 28th district ==
Incumbent Frank Tejeda died of brain cancer soon after the congressional elections. As no candidate received an outright majority during the first round on March 15, 1997 a special runoff was held on April 12, 1997, which was won by State Representative Ciro Rodriguez.

Texas's 28th congressional district special general election (1997)
Party	Candidate	Votes	%
Democratic	Ciro Rodriguez	19,992	66.68%
Democratic	Juan F. Solis III	9,990	33.32%
Total votes		29,982	100%
Democratic hold			
