= New York's 24th State Senate district =

American legislative district

Senator
Andrew Lanza; R–Great Kills
- Registration: 36.5% Republican; 36.2% Democratic; 21.6% No party preference
- Demographics: 76% White; 2% Black; 12% Hispanic; 8% Asian
- Population (2017): 330,279
- Registered voters: 223,405

New York's 24th State Senate district is one of 63 districts in the New York State Senate. It has been represented by Republican Andrew Lanza since 2007. District 24 is the most Republican-leaning district in the State Senate. Prior to the 2024 Senate elections, it was the only district in New York City to be represented by a Republican.

== Geography ==
District 24 covers the southern two-thirds of Staten Island, including the southernmost point in the state of New York.

The district is located entirely within New York's 11th congressional district, and overlaps with the 61st, 62nd, 63rd, and 64th districts of the New York State Assembly.

== Recent election results ==
=== 2026 ===
2026 New York State Senate election, District 24
Party	Candidate	Votes	%
Republican	Andrew Lanza		
Conservative	Andrew Lanza		
Total	Andrew Lanza (incumbent)		
Democratic	Alexis Rodriguez		
Write-in			
Total votes			100.0

=== 2024 ===
2024 New York State Senate election, District 24
Party	Candidate	Votes	%
Republican	Andrew Lanza	109,201	
Conservative	Andrew Lanza	11,443	
Total	Andrew Lanza (incumbent)	120,644	98.2
Write-in		2,167	1.8
Total votes		122,811	100.0
Republican hold			

=== 2022 ===
2022 New York State Senate election, District 24
Party	Candidate	Votes	%
Republican	Andrew Lanza	79,313	
Conservative	Andrew Lanza	7,329	
Total	Andrew Lanza (incumbent)	86,642	98.7
Write-in		1,105	1.3
Total votes		87,747	100.0
Republican hold			

=== 2020 ===
2020 New York State Senate election, District 24
Party	Candidate	Votes	%
Republican	Andrew Lanza	112,028	
Conservative	Andrew Lanza	11,400	
Independence	Andrew Lanza	6,468	
Total	Andrew Lanza (incumbent)	129,896	99.0
Write-in		1,285	1.0
Total votes		131,181	100.0
Republican hold			

=== 2018 ===
2018 New York State Senate election, District 24
Party	Candidate	Votes	%
Republican	Andrew Lanza	65,185	
Conservative	Andrew Lanza	6,561	
Independence	Andrew Lanza	6,238	
Reform	Andrew Lanza	2,169	
Total	Andrew Lanza (incumbent)	80,153	98.5
Write-in		1,183	1.5
Total votes		81,336	100.0
Republican hold			

=== 2016 ===
2016 New York State Senate election, District 24
Party	Candidate	Votes	%
Republican	Andrew Lanza	88,720	
Conservative	Andrew Lanza	9,522	
Independence	Andrew Lanza	7,404	
Reform	Andrew Lanza	1,711	
Total	Andrew Lanza (incumbent)	107,357	99.3
Write-in		718	0.7
Total votes		108,075	100.0
Republican hold			

=== 2014 ===
2014 New York State Senate election, District 24
Party	Candidate	Votes	%
Republican	Andrew Lanza	39,010	
Conservative	Andrew Lanza	5,531	
Independence	Andrew Lanza	2,684	
Total	Andrew Lanza (incumbent)	47,225	80.3
Democratic	Gary Carsel	10,329	
Working Families	Gary Carsel	1,218	
Total	Gary Carsel	11,547	19.6
Write-in		77	0.1
Total votes		58,849	100.0
Republican hold			

=== 2012 ===
2012 New York State Senate election, District 24
Party	Candidate	Votes	%
Republican	Andrew Lanza	67,731	
Conservative	Andrew Lanza	7,697	
Independence	Andrew Lanza	2,990	
Total	Andrew Lanza (incumbent)	78,418	74.5
Democratic	Gary Carsel	25,561	
Working Families	Gary Carsel	1,332	
Total	Gary Carsel	26,893	25.5
Write-in		75	0.0
Total votes		105,386	100.0
Republican hold			

=== Federal results in District 24 ===
Year	Office	Results
2020	President	Trump 66.1 – 32.7%
2016	President	Trump 66.5 – 31.2%
2012	President	Romney 58.7 – 40.3%
2012	Senate	Gillibrand 56.5 – 42.3%
