= John W. Lavelle =

American politician

Member of the New York State Assembly
- In office January 1, 2001 – January 24, 2007
- Preceded by: Elizabeth Connelly
- Succeeded by: Matthew Titone
- Constituency: 59th district (2001-2002); 61st district (2003-2007)

Personal details
- Born: January 26, 1949 Brooklyn, New York, U.S.
- Died: January 24, 2007 (aged 57) Staten Island, New York, U.S.
- Party: Democratic

John W. Lavelle (January 26, 1949 – January 24, 2007) represented the 61st Assembly District in the New York State Assembly, which comprised much of the North Shore of Staten Island.

Lavelle, a former executive with Met Life, served as a member of the New York State Charter Commission for Staten Island in 1993, and became Staten Island Democratic Party Chairman in 1999. He was first elected to the New York State Assembly in 2000, filling the seat formerly occupied by Assemblywoman Beth Connelly. He served on a number of committees, including Government Employees, Social Services, Veterans Affairs and Mental Health, among others. Assemblyman Lavelle was known for sponsoring bills calling for the same benefits of those who died in the 1993 World Trade Center bombing as those who died in the 2001 attack and for being an advocate for stronger gun control laws.

In addition, Lavelle spent over 20 years working for quality health care by serving on the Community Advisory Board for the Sisters of Charity Health Care System at St. Vincent's Medical Center. He started a monthly recreation program for patients at Sea View Hospital Rehabilitation Center and Home and served as Chairman of the Center's Advisory Board. He has also helped substance abusers get their lives back on track by serving as vice chair of the Camelot Counseling Center's Board of Directors.

Lavelle suffered a stroke on January 19, 2007, and died in a coma on January 24, just two days short of his 58th birthday. Lavelle is survived by his three sons and four grandchildren. To honor his death and to allow members of the New York State Assembly to attend his funeral, Speaker of the New York State Assembly Sheldon Silver canceled the session of the Assembly for January 28, 2007. The funeral service was attended by over 1,000 people and included the Governor of the State of New York Eliot Spitzer, New York State Attorney General Andrew Cuomo, candidates for New York State Comptroller, over 50 Assemblymembers, and all of the elected officials from Staten Island from both political parties. His seat was filled by special election, with fellow Democrat Matthew Titone elected to succeed him in the Assembly.

New York State Assembly
Preceded by Elizabeth Connelly	New York State Assembly, 59th District; 2001–2002	Succeeded by Frank R. Seddio
Preceded by Robert Straniere	New York State Assembly, 61st District; 2003–2007	Succeeded by Matthew Titone
