= Senator Wyrick =

Senator Wyrick may refer to:

- Charles Wyrick (born 1959), Oklahoma State Senate
- Phil Wyrick (fl. 1990s), Arkansas State Senate
