= 1998 United States House of Representatives elections =

House elections for the 106th U.S. Congress

- November 3, 1998

All 435 seats in the United States House of Representatives 218 seats needed for a majority
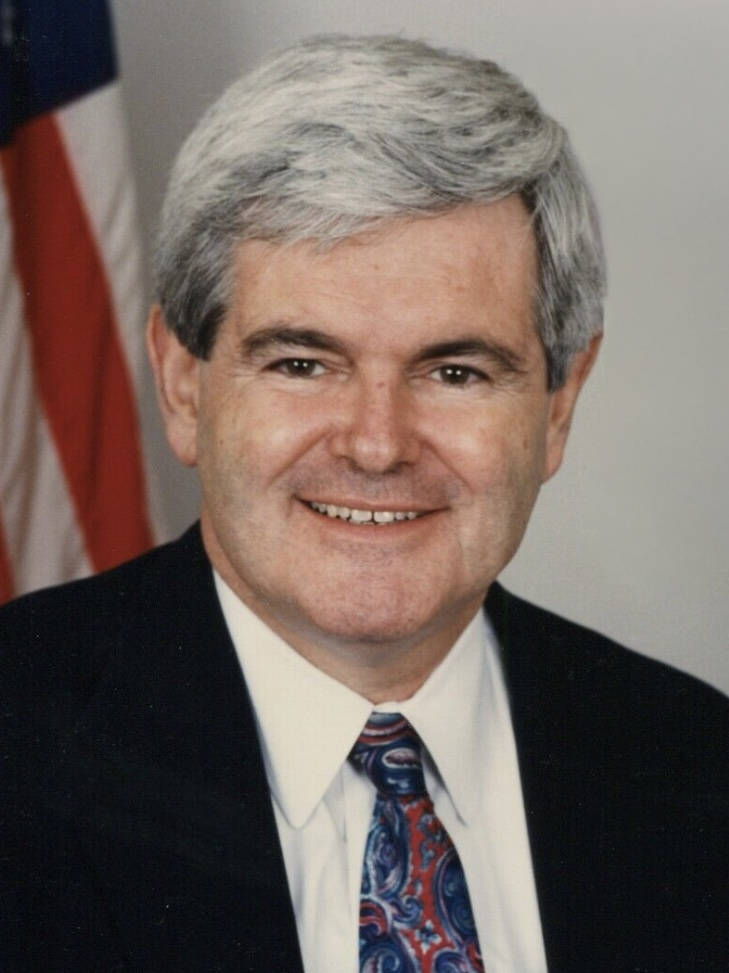

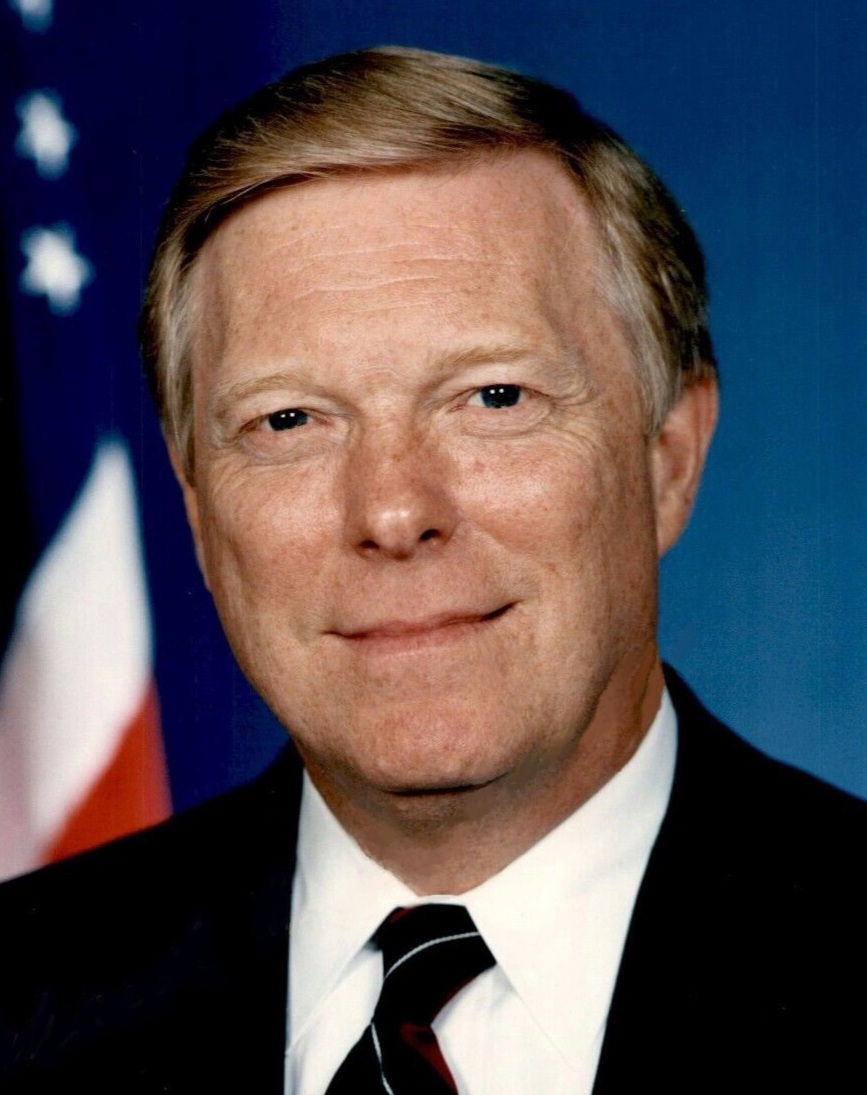
| | Majority party | Minority party |
|---|---|---|
| Leader | Newt Gingrich (resigned) | Dick Gephardt |
| Party | Republican | Democratic |
| Leader since | January 3, 1995 | January 3, 1995 |
| Leader's seat | Georgia 6th | Missouri 3rd |
| Last election | 227 seats | 206 seats |
| Seats won | 223 | 211 |
| Seat change | ▼4 | ▲5 |
| Popular vote | 32,237,964 | 31,490,298 |
| Percentage | 48.4% | 47.3% |
| Swing | ▲0.2pp | ▼0.9pp |
| | Third party |
| Party | Independent |
| Last election | 2 seats |
| Seats won | 1 |
| Seat change | ▼1 |
| Popular vote | 372,072 |
| Percentage | 0.6% |
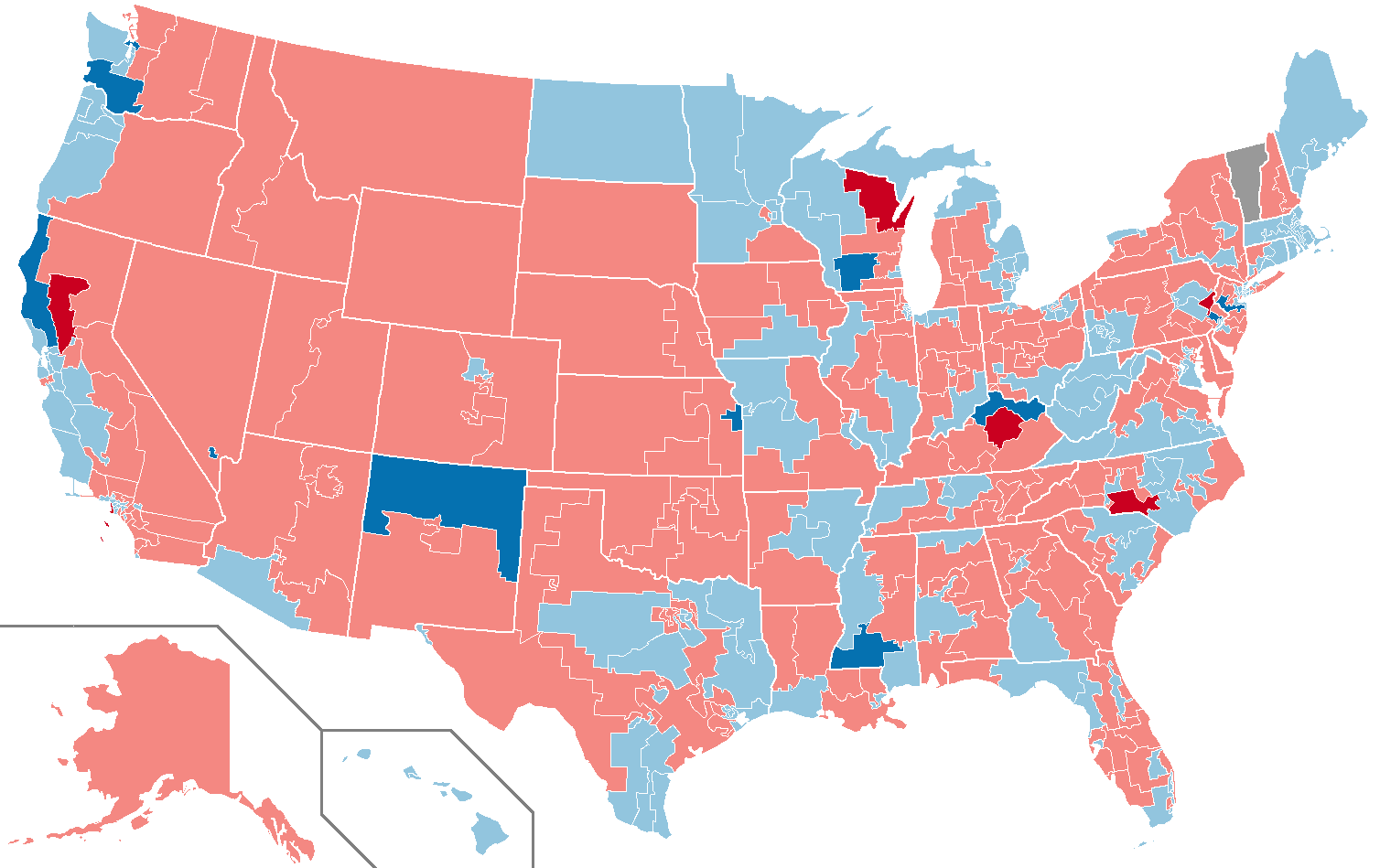
- Results: Democratic hold Democratic gain Republican hold Republican gain Independent hold
Speaker before election
Newt Gingrich
Republican
Elected Speaker
Dennis Hastert
Republican

The 1998 United States House of Representatives elections were held on November 3, 1998, to elect U.S. Representatives to serve in the 106th United States Congress. They were part of the midterm elections held during President Bill Clinton's second term. They were a major disappointment for the Republicans, who were expecting to gain seats due to the embarrassment Clinton suffered during the Monica Lewinsky scandal and the "six-year itch" effect observed in most second-term midterm elections. However, the Republicans lost five seats to the Democrats, although they retained a narrow majority in the House. A wave of Republican discontent with Speaker Newt Gingrich prompted him to resign shortly after the election; he was replaced by Congressman Dennis Hastert of Illinois.

The campaign was marked by Republican attacks on the morality of President Bill Clinton, with independent counsel Kenneth Starr having released his report on the Lewinsky scandal and House leaders having initiated an inquiry into whether impeachable offenses had occurred. However, exit polls indicated that most voters opposed impeaching Clinton, and predictions of high Republican or low Democratic turnout due to the scandal failed to materialize. Some speculate that the losses reflected a backlash against the Republicans for attacking the popular Clinton. With the Republicans having lost four House seats and failing to gain any seats in the Senate, it was the first time since 1934 that the non-presidential party failed to gain congressional seats in a midterm election; this would happen again in 2002. This was the last election until 2024 where no incumbents who served at least 6 terms (12 years) lost re-nomination or re-election, and it was also the most recent where no Democratic incumbent lost renomination.

== Results ==
=== Federal ===
↓
| 211 | 1 | 223 |
| Democratic | I | Republican |

| Party | Seats | | | Seat percentage | Vote percentage | Popular vote |
| Party | 1996 | Elected | Net change | Seat percentage | Vote percentage | Popular vote |
|---|---|---|---|---|---|---|
| Republican Party | 227 | 223 | ▼4 | 51.3% | 48.4% | 32,237,964 |
| Democratic Party | 206 | 211 | ▲5 | 48.5% | 47.3% | 31,490,298 |
| Libertarian Party | 0 | 0 | Steady | 0.0% | 1.3% | 880,024 |
| Independent | 2 | 1 | ▼1 | 0.2% | 0.6% | 372,072 |
| Reform Party | 0 | 0 | Steady | 0.0% | 0.4% | 239,173 |
| Natural Law Party | 0 | 0 | Steady | 0.0% | 0.3% | 195,015 |
| U.S. Taxpayers' Party | 0 | 0 | Steady | 0.0% | 0.1% | 73,983 |
| Green Party | 0 | 0 | Steady | 0.0% | 0.1% | 70,932 |
| Conservative Party | 0 | 0 | Steady | 0.0% | 0.1% | 57,775 |
| Right to Life Party | 0 | 0 | Steady | 0.0% | 0.1% | 52,356 |
| Independent American Party | 0 | 0 | Steady | 0.0% | 0.1% | 45,206 |
| Others | 0 | 0 | Steady | 0.0% | 1.3% | 890,004 |
| Totals | 435 | 435 | Steady | 100.0% | 100.0% | 66,604,802 |

Source: Election Statistics - Office of the Clerk

Popular vote
| Republican | 48.40% |
| Democratic | 47.28% |
| Libertarian | 1.32% |
| Others | 3.00% |

House seats
| Republican | 51.26% |
| Democratic | 48.51% |
| Others | 0.23% |

=== Maps ===
Popular vote and seats total by states

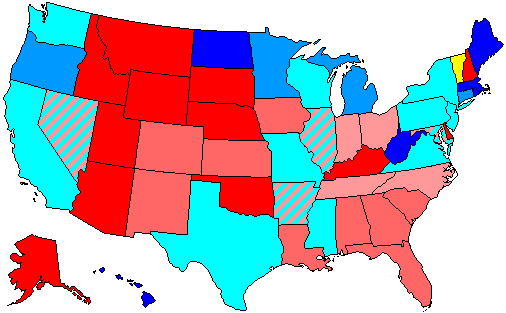
House seats by party holding plurality in state
80%+ Democratic
80%+ Republican
60%+ to 80% Democratic
60%+ to 80% Republican
Up to 60% Democratic
Up to 60% Republican
80%+ Independent

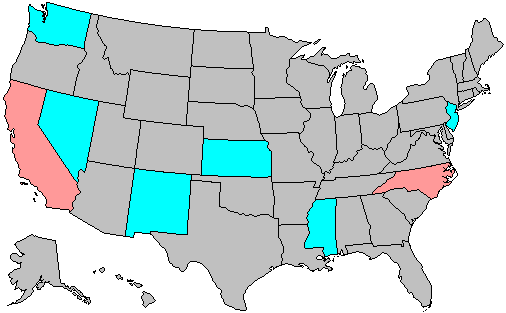
Summary of party change of U.S. House seats in the 1998 House election
6+ Democratic gain
6+ Republican gain
3–5 Democratic gain
3–5 Republican gain
1–2 Democratic gain
1–2 Republican gain
no net change

== Incumbent retirements ==
=== Democrats ===
1. California 3: Vic Fazio
2. California 34: Esteban Torres
3. California 36: Jane Harman: To run for Governor
4. Colorado 2: David Skaggs
5. Connecticut 1: Barbara B. Kennelly: To run for Governor
6. Illinois 9: Sidney R. Yates
7. Illinois 19: Glenn Poshard: To run for Governor
8. Indiana 9: Lee Hamilton
9. Kentucky 6: Scotty Baesler: To run for U.S. Senate
10. Massachusetts 8: Joseph P. Kennedy II
11. New York 7: Thomas Manton
12. New York 9: Chuck Schumer: To run for U.S. Senate
13. North Carolina 8: Bill Hefner
14. Ohio 11: Louis Stokes
15. Oregon 1: Elizabeth Furse
16. Pennsylvania 15: Paul McHale
17. Texas 20: Henry B. González

=== Republicans ===
1. California 1: Frank Riggs: To run for U.S. Senate
2. Colorado 6: Daniel Schaefer
3. Idaho 2: Mike Crapo: To run for U.S. Senate
4. Illinois 13: Harris Fawell
5. Kentucky 4: Jim Bunning: To run for U.S. Senate
6. Mississippi 4: Michael Parker: To run for Governor
7. Nebraska 2: Jon Christensen: To run for Governor
8. Nevada 1: John Ensign: To run for U.S. Senate
9. New York 22: Gerald Solomon
10. New York 27: Bill Paxon
11. Oregon 2: Bob Smith
12. Pennsylvania 10: Joseph M. McDade
13. South Carolina 4: Bob Inglis: To run for U.S. Senate
14. Washington 3: Linda Smith: To run for U.S. Senate
15. Wisconsin 1: Mark Neumann: To run for U.S. Senate
16. Wisconsin 2: Scott Klug

== Incumbents defeated ==
=== In primary elections ===
This remains the most recent election as of 2026 where no Democratic incumbent lost to a Democratic challenger.

==== Republicans who lost to a Republican challenger ====
1. California 41: Jay Kim lost to Gary Miller who later won the general election

=== In the general election ===
==== Democrats who lost to a Republican challenger ====
1. Wisconsin 8: Jay Johnson lost to Mark Green

==== Republicans who lost to a Democratic challenger ====
1. Kansas 3: Vince Snowbarger lost to Dennis Moore
2. New Jersey 12: Mike Pappas lost to Rush Holt Jr.
3. New Mexico 3: Bill Redmond lost to Tom Udall
4. Pennsylvania 13: Jon D. Fox lost to Joe Hoeffel
5. Washington 1: Rick White lost to Jay Inslee

== Closest races ==
Forty-three races were decided by 10% or lower.

| District | Winner | Margin |
|---|---|---|
| Pennsylvania 10th | Republican | 0.30% |
| Louisiana 6th | Republican | 1.49% |
| Connecticut 5th | Democratic | 1.49% |
| California 49th | Republican | 2.22% |
| California 36th | Republican (flip) | 2.32% |
| Colorado 2nd | Democratic | 2.43% |
| North Carolina 8th | Republican (flip) | 2.54% |
| Indiana 9th | Democratic | 2.83% |
| New Jersey 12th | Democratic (flip) | 2.87% |
| Oregon 1st | Democratic | 2.99% |
| Illinois 17th | Democratic | 3.12% |
| Nevada 1st | Democratic (flip) | 3.59% |
| Minnesota 6th | Democratic | 3.98% |
| Kentucky 3rd | Republican | 4.00 (Note: This seat was the tipping point seat for a Republican majority.) |
| California 27th | Republican | 4.29% |
| Kansas 3rd | Democratic (flip) | 4.78% |
| Pennsylvania 13th | Democratic | 4.98% |
| Washington 1st | Democratic (flip) | 5.66% |
| Wisconsin 2nd | Democratic (flip) | 5.79% |
| Ohio 1st | Republican | 5.97% |
| New York 4th | Democratic | 5.99% |
| Indiana 8th | Democratic | 6.13% |
| Arizona 5th | Republican | 6.41% |
| New Mexico 1st | Democratic | 6.55% |
| Kentucky 4th | Democratic (flip) | 6.82% |
| Michigan 10th | Democratic | 7.10% |
| Kentucky 6th | Republican (flip) | 7.15% |
| California 3rd | Republican (flip) | 7.37% |
| Idaho 2nd | Republican | 7.82% |
| New Jersey 7th | Republican | 8.09% |
| Texas 17th | Democratic | 8.29% |
| New Hampshire 2nd | Republican | 8.38% |
| Mississippi 4th | Democratic (flip) | 8.53% |
| California 38th | Republican | 8.37% |
| Montana at-large | Republican | 8.65% |
| Wisconsin 8th | Republican (flip) | 9.21% |
| Utah 2nd | Republican | 9.30% |
| Tennessee 6th | Democratic | 9.30% |
| Washington 3rd | Democratic (flip) | 9.31% |
| Arizona 6th | Republican | 9.37% |
| Minnesota 1st | Republican | 9.51% |
| New Mexico 3rd | Democratic (flip) | 9.89% |
| Pennsylvania 15th | Republican (flip) | 9.97% |

== Generic congressional ballot polls ==
| Poll source | Date(s) | Sample size | Republicans | Democrats | Other/ undecided (Note: Calculated by taking the difference of 100% and all other candidates combined.) |
|---|---|---|---|---|---|
| Gallup | November 2, 1998 | 1,037 (A) | 38% | 47% | 15% |
| CBS News/The New York Times | November 1, 1998 | 600 (Note: Sample size unavailable; 600 is a default estimate used in the source dataset.) | 48% | 49% | 3% |
| ABC News/The Washington Post | October 31, 1998 | 600 (Note: Average of multiple versions or turnout models listed in the poll.) | 47% | 47.5% | 5.5% |
| Gallup | October 31, 1998 | 1,105 | 45% | 49% | 6% |
| Pew Research Center | October 30, 1998 | 3,184 (A) | 39% | 48% | 13% |
| Pew Research Center | October 30, 1998 | 743 | 44% | 46% | 10% |
| Fox News/Opinion Dynamics Corp. | October 29, 1998 | 673 | 48% | 38% | 14% |
| PSB Research (D) (Note: Poll conducted for the Democratic Leadership Council.) | October 28, 1998 | 500 (RV) | 33% | 43% | 24% |
| CBS News/The New York Times | October 27, 1998 | 485 | 50% | 47% | 3% |
| NBC News/The Wall Street Journal | October 26, 1998 | 1,025 (RV) | 40% | 43% | 17% |
| ABC News/The Washington Post | October 25, 1998 | 600 (RV) | 36% | 44% | 20% |
| ABC News/The Washington Post | October 24, 1998 | 581 | 47% | 49% | 4% |
| Gallup | October 24, 1998 | 519 | 49% | 47% | 4% |
| SSRS | October 23, 1998 | 600 | 39% | 44% | 17% |
| Wirthlin Worldwide | October 19, 1998 | 416 | 45% | 41% | 14% |
| ABC News/The Washington Post | October 17, 1998 | 548 | 47% | 48% | 5% |
| Hill Research Consultants | October 16, 1998 | 600 | 38% | 41% | 21% |
| Pew Research Center | October 16, 1998 | 743 | 48% | 43% | 9% |
| Yankelovich Partners Inc. | October 15, 1998 | 442 | 47% | 47% | 6% |
| CBS News/The New York Times | October 13, 1998 | 600 | 46% | 48% | 6% |
| Zogby Interactive/JZ Analytics | October 13, 1998 | 864 | 36% | 39% | 25% |

== Special elections ==
| District | Incumbent | Party | First elected | Results | Candidates |
|---|---|---|---|---|---|
| New York 6 | Floyd Flake | Democratic | 1986 | Incumbent resigned November 17, 1997 to work at his church full-time. New member elected February 3, 1998. Democratic hold. Winner was re-elected in November, see below. | ▌ ✓ Gregory Meeks (Democratic) 56.51%; ▌Alton Waldon (Conservative) 20.77%; ▌Barbara M. Clark (21st Century) 13.13%; ▌Celestine V. Miller (Republican) 8.78% |
| California 22 | Walter Capps | Democratic | 1996 | Incumbent died October 28, 1997. New member elected March 10, 1998. Democratic hold. Winner was re-elected in November, see below. | ▌ ✓ Lois Capps (Democratic) 53.46%; ▌Tom J. Bordonaro Jr. (Republican) 44.78%; ▌Robert Bakhaus (Libertarian) 1.76% |
| California 9 | Ron Dellums | Democratic | 1970 | Incumbent resigned February 6, 1998. New member elected April 7, 1998. Democratic hold. Winner was re-elected in November, see below. | ▌ ✓ Barbara Lee (Democratic) 66.81%; ▌Greg Harper (Democratic) 16.05%; ▌Claiborne Sanders (Republican) 12.19%; ▌Randal Stewart (Democratic) 4.95% |
| California 44 | Sonny Bono | Republican | 1994 | Incumbent died January 5, 1998. New member elected April 7, 1998. Republican hold. Winner was re-elected in November, see below. | ▌ ✓ Mary Bono (Republican) 63.98%; ▌Ralph Waite (Democratic) 28.84%; ▌Anna Nevenic (Democratic) 2.88%; ▌John W. J. Overman (Republican) 1.71%; ▌Tom Harney (Republican) 1.47%; ▌A. J. Mathewson (Republican) 1.13% |
| Pennsylvania 1 | Thomas M. Foglietta | Democratic | 1980 | Incumbent resigned November 11, 1997, to become U.S. Ambassador to Italy. New member elected May 19, 1998. Democratic hold. Winner was re-elected in November, see below. | ▌ ✓ Bob Brady (Democratic) 73.63%; ▌William M. Harrison (Republican) 12.88%; ▌Juanita Norwood (Reform) 10.54%; ▌John J. Featherman (Libertarian) 2.95% |
| New Mexico 1 | Steven Schiff | Republican | 1988 | Incumbent died March 25, 1998. New member elected June 23, 1998. Republican hold. Winner was re-elected in November, see below. | ▌ ✓ Heather Wilson (Republican) 44.58%; ▌Phillip Maloof (Democratic) 39.61%; ▌Robert Anderson (Green) 14.72%; ▌Bruce M. Bush (Libertarian) 1.09% |

== Alabama ==
| District | | Incumbent | | | | Candidates |
| Location | 1997 PVI | Member | Party | First elected | Status | Candidates |
|---|---|---|---|---|---|---|
| Alabama 1 | R+12 | Sonny Callahan | Republican | 1984 | Incumbent re-elected. | ▌ ✓ Sonny Callahan (Republican); Uncontested |
| Alabama 2 | R+14 | Terry Everett | Republican | 1992 | Incumbent re-elected. | ▌ ✓ Terry Everett (Republican) 69%; ▌Joe Fondren (Democratic) 31% |
| Alabama 3 | R+7 | Bob Riley | Republican | 1996 | Incumbent re-elected. | ▌ ✓ Bob Riley (Republican) 58%; ▌Joe Turnham (Democratic) 42% |
| Alabama 4 | R+7 | Robert Aderholt | Republican | 1996 | Incumbent re-elected. | ▌ ✓ Robert Aderholt (Republican) 56%; ▌Don Bevill (Democratic) 44% |
| Alabama 5 | R+7 | Bud Cramer | Democratic | 1990 | Incumbent re-elected. | ▌ ✓ Bud Cramer (Democratic) 70%; ▌Gil Aust (Republican) 30% |
| Alabama 6 | R+26 | Spencer Bachus | Republican | 1992 | Incumbent re-elected. | ▌ ✓ Spencer Bachus (Republican) 72%; ▌Donna Wesson Smalley (Democratic) 28% |
| Alabama 7 | D+19 | Earl Hilliard | Democratic | 1992 | Incumbent re-elected. | ▌ ✓ Earl Hilliard (Democratic); Uncontested |

== Alaska ==
| District | | Incumbent | | | | Candidates |
| Location | 1997 PVI | Member | Party | First elected | Status | Candidates |
|---|---|---|---|---|---|---|
| Alaska at-large | R+14 | Don Young | Republican | 1973 (Special) | Incumbent re-elected. | ▌ ✓ Don Young (Republican) 62.6%; ▌Jim Duncan (Democratic) 34.6%; ▌John Grames (Green) 2.7% |

== Arizona ==
| District | | Incumbent | | | | Candidates |
| Location | 1997 PVI | Member | Party | First elected | Status | Candidates |
|---|---|---|---|---|---|---|
| Arizona 1 | R+6 | Matt Salmon | Republican | 1994 | Incumbent re-elected. | ▌ ✓ Matt Salmon (Republican) 64%; ▌David Mendoza (Democratic) 36% |
| Arizona 2 | D+13 | Ed Pastor | Democratic | 1991 (Special) | Incumbent re-elected. | ▌ ✓ Ed Pastor (Democratic) 67.8%; ▌Edward Barron (Republican) 28%; ▌Richard Duncan (Libertarian) 3.1%; ▌Gregory R. Schultz (Reform) 1.1% |
| Arizona 3 | R+9 | Bob Stump | Republican | 1976 (Note: Stump was originally elected as a Democrat. He switched parties in 1982 and was re-elected as such that year.) | Incumbent re-elected. | ▌ ✓ Bob Stump (Republican) 67%; ▌Stuart Starky (Democratic) 33% |
| Arizona 4 | R+8 | John Shadegg | Republican | 1994 | Incumbent re-elected. | ▌ ✓ John Shadegg (Republican) 64.7%; ▌Eric Ehst (Democratic) 31.2%; ▌Ernest Hancock (Libertarian) 2.4%; ▌Doug Quelland (Independent) 1.7% |
| Arizona 5 | R+2 | Jim Kolbe | Republican | 1984 | Incumbent re-elected. | ▌ ✓ Jim Kolbe (Republican) 51.6%; ▌Thomas Volgy (Democratic) 45.2%; ▌Phillip W. Murphy (Libertarian) 2.5%; ▌Robert Connery Sr. (Reform) 0.8% |
| Arizona 6 | R+3 | J. D. Hayworth | Republican | 1994 | Incumbent re-elected. | ▌ ✓ J. D. Hayworth (Republican) 53%; ▌Steve Owens (Democratic) 43.7%; ▌Robert Anderson (Libertarian) 3.3% |

== Arkansas ==
| District | | Incumbent | | | | Candidates |
| Location | 1997 PVI | Member | Party | First elected | Status | Candidates |
|---|---|---|---|---|---|---|
| Arkansas 1 | D+10 | Marion Berry | Democratic | 1996 | Incumbent re-elected. | ▌ ✓ Marion Berry (Democratic); Uncontested |
| Arkansas 2 | D+6 | Vic Snyder | Democratic | 1996 | Incumbent re-elected. | ▌ ✓ Vic Snyder (Democratic) 58%; ▌Phil Wyrick (Republican) 42% |
| Arkansas 3 | R+5 | Asa Hutchinson | Republican | 1996 | Incumbent re-elected. | ▌ ✓ Asa Hutchinson (Republican) 80.7%; ▌Ralph Forbes (Reform) 19.3% |
| Arkansas 4 | D+11 | Jay Dickey | Republican | 1992 | Incumbent re-elected. | ▌ ✓ Jay Dickey (Republican) 57.5%; ▌Judy Smith (Democratic) 42.5% |

== California ==
| District | | Incumbent | | | | Candidates |
| Location | 1997 PVI | Member | Party | First elected | Status | Candidates |
|---|---|---|---|---|---|---|
| California 1 | D+4 | Frank Riggs | Republican | 1990; 1992 (defeated); 1994 | Incumbent retired to run for U.S. Senator. Democratic gain. | ▌ ✓ Mike Thompson (Democratic) 61.9%; ▌Mark Luce (Republican) 32.8%; ▌Emil Rossi (Libertarian) 2.8%; ▌Ernest K. Jones Jr. (Peace and Freedom) 2.5% |
| California 2 | R+11 | Wally Herger | Republican | 1988 | Incumbent re-elected. | ▌ ✓ Wally Herger (Republican) 62.5%; ▌Roberts Braden (Democratic) 34.5%; ▌Patrice Thiessen (Natural Law) 3% |
| California 3 | R+3 | Vic Fazio | Democratic | 1978 | Incumbent retired. Republican gain. | ▌ ✓ Doug Ose (Republican) 52.4%; ▌Sandra Dunn (Democratic) 45%; ▌Ross Crain (Libertarian) 2.6% |
| California 4 | R+11 | John Doolittle | Republican | 1990 | Incumbent re-elected. | ▌ ✓ John Doolittle (Republican) 62.6%; ▌David Shapiro (Democratic) 34.4%; ▌Dan Winterrowd (Libertarian) 3% |
| California 5 | D+8 | Bob Matsui | Democratic | 1978 | Incumbent re-elected. | ▌ ✓ Bob Matsui (Democratic) 71.9%; ▌Robert S. Dinsmore (Republican) 26%; ▌Douglas Arthur Tuma (Libertarian) 2.1% |
| California 6 | D+13 | Lynn Woolsey | Democratic | 1992 | Incumbent re-elected. | ▌ ✓ Lynn Woolsey (Democratic) 68%; ▌Ken McAuliffe (Republican) 29.7%; ▌Alan Roy Barreca (Natural Law) 2.3% |
| California 7 | D+18 | George Miller | Democratic | 1974 | Incumbent re-elected. | ▌ ✓ George Miller (Democratic) 77%; ▌Norman Reece (Republican) 23% |
| California 8 | D+25 | Nancy Pelosi | Democratic | 1987 | Incumbent re-elected. | ▌ ✓ Nancy Pelosi (Democratic) 85.8%; ▌David Martz (Republican) 12%; ▌David Smithstein (Natural Law) 2.1% |
| California 9 | D+31 | Barbara Lee | Democratic | April 7, 1998 (special) | Incumbent re-elected. | ▌ ✓ Barbara Lee (Democratic) 82.8%; ▌Claiborne Sanders (Republican) 13.2%; ▌Gerald Sanders (Peace and Freedom) 2.8%; ▌Walter Kenneth Ruehlig (Natural Law) 1.2% |
| California 10 | R+1 | Ellen Tauscher | Democratic | 1996 | Incumbent re-elected. | ▌ ✓ Ellen Tauscher (Democratic) 53.5%; ▌Charles Ball (Republican) 43.4%; ▌Valerie Janlois (Natural Law) 1.7%; ▌John Place (Reform) 1.4% |
| California 11 | R+4 | Richard Pombo | Republican | 1992 | Incumbent re-elected. | ▌ ✓ Richard Pombo (Republican) 61.4%; ▌Robert Figueroa (Democratic) 36.3%; ▌Jesse Baird (Libertarian) 2.3% |
| California 12 | D+20 | Tom Lantos | Democratic | 1980 | Incumbent re-elected. | ▌ ✓ Tom Lantos (Democratic) 74%; ▌Robert Evans (Republican) 21.1%; ▌Michael Moloney (Libertarian) 4.9% |
| California 13 | D+15 | Pete Stark | Democratic | 1972 | Incumbent re-elected. | ▌ ✓ Pete Stark (Democratic) 71.2%; ▌James Goetz (Republican) 26.7%; ▌Karnig Beylikjian (Natural Law) 2.2% |
| California 14 | D+11 | Anna Eshoo | Democratic | 1992 | Incumbent re-elected. | ▌ ✓ Anna Eshoo (Democratic) 68.6%; ▌Chris Haugen (Republican) 28.4%; ▌Joseph Dehn III (Libertarian) 1.7% |
| California 15 | D+6 | Tom Campbell | Republican | 1988; 1992 (Defeated); 1995 (Special) | Incumbent re-elected. | ▌ ✓ Tom Campbell (Republican) 60.5%; ▌Dick Lane (Democratic) 37.9%; ▌Frank Strutner (Natural Law) 1.5% |
| California 16 | D+13 | Zoe Lofgren | Democratic | 1994 | Incumbent re-elected. | ▌ ✓ Zoe Lofgren (Democratic) 72.8%; ▌Horace Gene Thayn (Republican) 23.4%; ▌John H. Black (Natural Law) 3.8% |
| California 17 | D+9 | Sam Farr | Democratic | 1993 | Incumbent re-elected. | ▌ ✓ Sam Farr (Democratic) 64.5%; ▌Bill McCampbell (Republican) 32.7%; ▌Rick Garrett (Libertarian) 1.7%; ▌Scott Hartley (Natural Law) 1% |
| California 18 | R+4 | Gary Condit | Democratic | 1989 | Incumbent re-elected. | ▌ ✓ Gary Condit (Democratic) 86.7%; ▌Linda De Groat (Libertarian) 13.2% |
| California 19 | R+10 | George Radanovich | Republican | 1996 | Incumbent re-elected. | ▌ ✓ George Radanovich (Republican) 79.4%; ▌Jonathan Richter (Libertarian) 20.6% |
| California 20 | D+2 | Cal Dooley | Democratic | 1990 | Incumbent re-elected. | ▌ ✓ Cal Dooley (Democratic) 60.7%; ▌Cliff Unruh (Republican) 39.3% |
| California 21 | R+16 | Bill Thomas | Republican | 1978 | Incumbent re-elected. | ▌ ✓ Bill Thomas (Republican) 78.9%; ▌John Evans (Reform) 21.1% |
| California 22 | R+4 | Lois Capps | Democratic | March 10, 1998 (special) | Incumbent re-elected. | ▌ ✓ Lois Capps (Democratic) 55.1%; ▌Thomas Bordonaro (Republican) 43.0%; ▌Robert Bakhaus (Libertarian) 1.3%; ▌Richard Dick Porter (Reform) 0.6% |
| California 23 | R+2 | Elton Gallegly | Republican | 1986 | Incumbent re-elected. | ▌ ✓ Elton Gallegly (Republican) 60.1%; ▌Daniel Gonzalez (Democratic) 39.9% |
| California 24 | D+5 | Brad Sherman | Democratic | 1996 | Incumbent re-elected. | ▌ ✓ Brad Sherman (Democratic) 57.3%; ▌Randy Hoffman (Republican) 38.5%; ▌Catherine Carter (Natural Law) 1.7%; ▌Erich D. Miller (Libertarian) 1.5%; ▌Ralph L. Shroyer (Peace and Freedom) 1% |
| California 25 | R+8 | Buck McKeon | Republican | 1992 | Incumbent re-elected. | ▌ ✓ Buck McKeon (Republican) 74.7%; ▌Bruce Acker (Libertarian) 25.3% |
| California 26 | D+17 | Howard Berman | Democratic | 1982 | Incumbent re-elected. | ▌ ✓ Howard Berman (Democratic) 82.5%; ▌Juan Carlos Ros (Libertarian) 7.8%; ▌Maria Armoudian (Green) 5.8%; ▌David Cossak (Natural Law) 3.9% |
| California 27 | Even | James E. Rogan | Republican | 1996 | Incumbent re-elected. | ▌ ✓ James E. Rogan (Republican) 50.7%; ▌Barry Gordon (Democratic) 46.4%; ▌Bob New (Libertarian) 2.8% |
| California 28 | R+4 | David Dreier | Republican | 1980 | Incumbent re-elected. | ▌ ✓ David Dreier (Republican) 57.6%; ▌Janice Nelson (Democratic) 39.2%; ▌Jerry Douglas (Libertarian) 1.3%; ▌Walt Contreras Sheasby (Green) 1.2%; ▌M. Lawrence Allison (Natural Law) 0.5% |
| California 29 | D+20 | Henry Waxman | Democratic | 1974 | Incumbent re-elected. | ▌ ✓ Henry Waxman (Democratic) 73.9%; ▌Mike Gottlieb (Republican) 22.6%; ▌Michael J. Binkley (Libertarian) 2%; ▌Karen Blasdell-Wilkinson (Natural Law) 1.5% |
| California 30 | D+22 | Xavier Becerra | Democratic | 1992 | Incumbent re-elected. | ▌ ✓ Xavier Becerra (Democratic) 81.3%; ▌Patricia Parker (Republican) 18.8% |
| California 31 | D+15 | Matthew G. Martínez | Democratic | 1982 | Incumbent re-elected. | ▌ ✓ Matthew G. Martínez (Democratic) 70%; ▌Frank Moreno (Republican) 22.6%; ▌Krista Lieberg-Wong (Green) 5%; ▌Michael Everling (Libertarian) 1.3%; ▌Gary Hearne (Natural Law) 1% |
| California 32 | D+32 | Julian Dixon | Democratic | 1978 | Incumbent re-elected. | ▌ ✓ Julian Dixon (Democratic) 86.7%; ▌Lawrence Ardito (Republican) 11.3%; ▌Velko Milosevich (Libertarian) 2% |
| California 33 | D+28 | Lucille Roybal-Allard | Democratic | 1992 | Incumbent re-elected. | ▌ ✓ Lucille Roybal-Allard (Democratic) 87.2%; ▌Wayne Miller (Republican) 12.8% |
| California 34 | D+14 | Esteban Edward Torres | Democratic | 1982 | Incumbent retired. Democratic hold. | ▌ ✓ Grace Napolitano (Democratic) 67.6%; ▌Ed Perez (Republican) 28.6%; ▌Jason Heath (Libertarian) 1.9%; ▌James W. Scott (American Independent) 1.9% |
| California 35 | D+33 | Maxine Waters | Democratic | 1990 | Incumbent re-elected. | ▌ ✓ Maxine Waters (Democratic) 89.3%; ▌Gordon Michael Mego (American Independent) 10.7% |
| California 36 | R+1 | Jane Harman | Democratic | 1992 | Incumbent retired to run for Governor. Republican gain. | ▌ ✓ Steven T. Kuykendall (Republican) 48.9%; ▌Janice Hahn (Democratic) 46.6%; ▌Robin Barrett (Green) 2%; ▌Kerry Welsh (Libertarian) 1.7%; ▌John Konopka (American Independent) 0.9% |
| California 37 | D+31 | Juanita Millender-McDonald | Democratic | 1996 | Incumbent re-elected. | ▌ ✓ Juanita Millender-McDonald (Democratic) 85.1%; ▌Saul Lankster (Republican) 14.9% |
| California 38 | D+5 | Steve Horn | Republican | 1992 | Incumbent re-elected. | ▌ ✓ Steve Horn (Republican) 52.9%; ▌Peter Mathews (Democratic) 44.3%; ▌David Bowers (Libertarian) 2.8% |
| California 39 | R+9 | Ed Royce | Republican | 1992 | Incumbent re-elected. | ▌ ✓ Ed Royce (Republican) 62.6%; ▌Cecy Groom (Democratic) 34%; ▌Jack Dean (Libertarian) 2.2%; ▌Ron Jevning (Natural Law) 1.3% |
| California 40 | R+10 | Jerry Lewis | Republican | 1978 | Incumbent re-elected. | ▌ ✓ Jerry Lewis (Republican) 64.9%; ▌Robert Conaway (Democratic) 31.9%; ▌Maurice Mayben (Libertarian) 3.2% |
| California 41 | R+7 | Jay Kim | Republican | 1992 | Incumbent lost renomination. Republican hold. | ▌ ✓ Gary Miller (Republican) 53.2%; ▌Eileen Ansari (Democratic) 40.7%; ▌Cynthia Allaire (Green) 2.8%; ▌Kenneth E. Valentine (Libertarian) 2%; ▌David Kramer (Natural Law) 1.3% |
| California 42 | D+5 | George Brown Jr. | Democratic | 1962; 1970 (Retired); 1972 | Incumbent re-elected. | ▌ ✓ George Brown Jr. (Democratic) 55.3%; ▌Eli Pirozzi (Republican) 40.3%; ▌Hale McGee (American Independent) 2.7%; ▌David Hollist (Libertarian) 1.7% |
| California 43 | R+6 | Ken Calvert | Republican | 1992 | Incumbent re-elected. | ▌ ✓ Ken Calvert (Republican) 55.7%; ▌Mike Rayburn (Democratic) 37.8%; ▌Phill Courtney (Green) 3.7%; ▌Annie Wallack (Natural Law) 2.8% |
| California 44 | R+4 | Mary Bono | Republican | April 7, 1998 (special) | Incumbent re-elected. | ▌ ✓ Mary Bono (Republican) 60%; ▌Ralph Waite (Democratic) 35.7%; ▌Jim Meuer (Natural Law) 4.2% |
| California 45 | R+11 | Dana Rohrabacher | Republican | 1988 | Incumbent re-elected. | ▌ ✓ Dana Rohrabacher (Republican) 56.4%; ▌Patricia Neal (Democratic) 37.3%; ▌Don Hull (Libertarian) 2.7%; ▌William Verkamp (Natural Law) 1.3% |
| California 46 | R+1 | Loretta Sanchez | Democratic | 1996 | Incumbent re-elected. | ▌ ✓ Loretta Sanchez (Democratic) 56.4%; ▌Bob Dornan (Republican) 39.2%; ▌Thomas Reimer (Libertarian) 2.7%; ▌Larry Engwall (Natural Law) 1.6% |
| California 47 | R+14 | Christopher Cox | Republican | 1988 | Incumbent re-elected. | ▌ ✓ Christopher Cox (Republican) 67.6%; ▌Christina Avalos (Democratic) 29.5%; ▌Victor A. Wagner Jr. (Libertarian) 1.5%; ▌Paul Fisher (Natural Law) 0.7% |
| California 48 | R+16 | Ron Packard | Republican | 1982 | Incumbent re-elected. | ▌ ✓ Ron Packard (Republican) 76.9%; ▌Sharon Miles (Natural Law) 12.9%; ▌Daniel L. Muhe (Libertarian) 10.2% |
| California 49 | D+1 | Brian Bilbray | Republican | 1994 | Incumbent re-elected. | ▌ ✓ Brian Bilbray (Republican) 48.8%; ▌Christine Kehoe (Democratic) 46.6%; ▌Ernest Lippe (Libertarian) 1.8%; ▌Julia Simon (Natural Law) 1.5%; ▌Janice Jordan (Peace and Freedom) 1.3% |
| California 50 | D+10 | Bob Filner | Democratic | 1992 | Incumbent re-elected. | ▌Bob Filner (Democratic); Uncontested |
| California 51 | R+11 | Duke Cunningham | Republican | 1990 | Incumbent re-elected. | ▌ ✓ Duke Cunningham (Republican) 61%; ▌Dan Kripke (Democratic) 34.7%; ▌Jack C. Anderson (Libertarian) 2.6%; ▌Eric Hunter Bourdette (Natural Law) 1.7% |
| California 52 | R+8 | Duncan L. Hunter | Republican | 1980 | Incumbent re-elected. | ▌ ✓ Duncan L. Hunter (Republican) 75.7%; ▌Lynn Badler (Libertarian) 14.3%; ▌Adrienne Pelton (Natural Law) 10% |

== Colorado ==
| District | | Incumbent | | | | Candidates |
| Location | 1997 PVI | Member | Party | First elected | Status | Candidates |
|---|---|---|---|---|---|---|
| Colorado 1 | D+13 | Diana DeGette | Democratic | 1996 | Incumbent re-elected. | ▌ ✓ Diana DeGette (Democratic) 66.9%; ▌Nancy McClanahan (Republican) 30.1%; ▌Richard Combs (Libertarian) 3% |
| Colorado 2 | D+2 | David Skaggs | Democratic | 1986 | Incumbent retired. Democratic hold. | ▌ ✓ Mark Udall (Democratic) 49.9%; ▌Bob Greenlee (Republican) 47.4%; ▌Patrick C. West (Natural Law) 2.7% |
| Colorado 3 | R+4 | Scott McInnis | Republican | 1992 | Incumbent re-elected. | ▌ ✓ Scott McInnis (Republican) 66.1%; ▌Reed Kelley (Democratic) 31.5%; ▌Barry Maggert (Libertarian) 2.4% |
| Colorado 4 | R+8 | Bob Schaffer | Republican | 1996 | Incumbent re-elected. | ▌ ✓ Bob Schaffer (Republican) 59%; ▌Susan Kirkpatrick (Democratic) 41% |
| Colorado 5 | R+19 | Joel Hefley | Republican | 1986 | Incumbent re-elected. | ▌ ✓ Joel Hefley (Republican) 72.7%; ▌Ken Alford (Democratic) 26%; ▌Mark A. Mellot (Natural Law) 1.3% |
| Colorado 6 | R+7 | Daniel Schaefer | Republican | 1983 | Incumbent retired. Republican hold. | ▌ ✓ Tom Tancredo (Republican) 55.9%; ▌Henry Strauss (Democratic) 41.5%; ▌George Newman (Natural Law) 2.6% |

== Connecticut ==
| District | | Incumbent | | | | Candidates |
| Location | 1997 PVI | Member | Party | First elected | Status | Candidates |
|---|---|---|---|---|---|---|
| Connecticut 1 | D+11 | Barbara B. Kennelly | Democratic | 1982 | Incumbent retired to run for Governor. Democratic hold. | ▌ ✓ John B. Larson (Democratic) 58%; ▌Kevin O'Connor (Republican) 41.4%; ▌Jay E. Palmieri IV (Term Limits) .5% |
| Connecticut 2 | D+7 | Sam Gejdenson | Democratic | 1980 | Incumbent re-elected. | ▌ ✓ Sam Gejdenson (Democratic) 61%; ▌Gary Koval (Republican) 35.5%; ▌Dianne G. Ondusko (Independence) 3.1%; ▌Paul W. Cook (Term Limits) 0.4% |
| Connecticut 3 | D+8 | Rosa DeLauro | Democratic | 1990 | Incumbent re-elected. | ▌ ✓ Rosa DeLauro (Democratic) 71.3%; ▌Martin Reust (Republican) 27.4%; ▌Kristen J. Abbatiello (Term Limits) 0.5%; ▌David Cole (Reform) 0.4%; ▌Gail J. Dalby (Natural Law) 0.4% |
| Connecticut 4 | Even | Chris Shays | Republican | 1987 (special) | Incumbent re-elected. | ▌ ✓ Chris Shays (Republican) 69%; ▌Jonathan Kantrowitz (Democratic) 29.9%; ▌Marshall C. Harrison (Libertarian) 1.1% |
| Connecticut 5 | R+2 | James H. Maloney | Democratic | 1996 | Incumbent re-elected. | ▌ ✓ Jim Maloney (Democratic) 49.9%; ▌Mark Nielsen (Republican) 48.4%; ▌Robert Strasdauskas (Concerned Citizens) 1.7% |
| Connecticut 6 | D+2 | Nancy Johnson | Republican | 1982 | Incumbent re-elected. | ▌ ✓ Nancy Johnson (Republican) 58.1%; ▌Charlotte Koskoff (Democratic) 39.6%; ▌Timothy A. Knibbs (Concerned Citizens) 1.8%; ▌Mark J. Polon (Term Limits) 0.4% |

== Delaware ==
| District | | Incumbent | | | | Candidates |
| Location | 1997 PVI | Member | Party | First elected | Status | Candidates |
|---|---|---|---|---|---|---|
| Delaware at-large | D+3 | Mike Castle | Republican | 1992 | Incumbent re-elected. | ▌ ✓ Mike Castle (Republican) 66.4%; ▌Dennis E. Williams (Democratic) 31.8%; ▌James P. Webster (U.S. Taxpayers) 1.3%; ▌Kim Stanley Bemis (Natural Law) 0.5% |

== Florida ==
| District | | Incumbent | | | | Candidates |
| Location | 1997 PVI | Member | Party | First elected | Status | Candidates |
|---|---|---|---|---|---|---|
| Florida 1 | R+20 | Joe Scarborough | Republican | 1994 | Incumbent re-elected. | ▌ ✓ Joe Scarborough (Republican) 99.5%; Uncontested |
| Florida 2 | R+1 | Allen Boyd | Democratic | 1996 | Incumbent re-elected. | ▌ ✓ Allen Boyd (Democratic); Uncontested |
| Florida 3 | D+8 | Corrine Brown | Democratic | 1992 | Incumbent re-elected. | ▌ ✓ Corrine Brown (Democratic) 56%; ▌Bill Randall (Republican) 44% |
| Florida 4 | R+16 | Tillie Fowler | Republican | 1992 | Incumbent re-elected. | ▌ ✓ Tillie Fowler (Republican); Uncontested |
| Florida 5 | D+2 | Karen Thurman | Democratic | 1992 | Incumbent re-elected. | ▌ ✓ Karen Thurman (Democratic) 66.3%; ▌Jack Gargan (Reform) 33.7% |
| Florida 6 | R+11 | Cliff Stearns | Republican | 1988 | Incumbent re-elected. | ▌ ✓ Cliff Stearns (Republican); Uncontested |
| Florida 7 | R+8 | John Mica | Republican | 1992 | Incumbent re-elected. | ▌ ✓ John Mica (Republican); Uncontested |
| Florida 8 | R+8 | Bill McCollum | Republican | 1980 | Incumbent re-elected. | ▌ ✓ Bill McCollum (Republican) 66%; ▌Al Krulick (Democratic) 34% |
| Florida 9 | R+6 | Michael Bilirakis | Republican | 1982 | Incumbent re-elected. | ▌ ✓ Michael Bilirakis (Republican); Uncontested |
| Florida 10 | D+2 | Bill Young | Republican | 1970 | Incumbent re-elected. | ▌ ✓ Bill Young (Republican); Uncontested |
| Florida 11 | D+1 | Jim Davis | Democratic | 1996 | Incumbent re-elected. | ▌ ✓ Jim Davis (Democratic) 65%; ▌John Chillura (Republican) 35% |
| Florida 12 | R+8 | Charles T. Canady | Republican | 1992 | Incumbent re-elected. | ▌ ✓ Charles T. Canady (Republican); Uncontested |
| Florida 13 | R+7 | Dan Miller | Republican | 1992 | Incumbent re-elected. | ▌ ✓ Dan Miller (Republican); Uncontested |
| Florida 14 | R+12 | Porter Goss | Republican | 1988 | Incumbent re-elected. | ▌ ✓ Porter Goss (Republican); Uncontested |
| Florida 15 | R+9 | Dave Weldon | Republican | 1994 | Incumbent re-elected. | ▌ ✓ Dave Weldon (Republican) 63%; ▌David Golding (Democratic) 37% |
| Florida 16 | R+3 | Mark Foley | Republican | 1994 | Incumbent re-elected. | ▌ ✓ Mark Foley (Republican); Uncontested |
| Florida 17 | D+31 | Carrie Meek | Democratic | 1992 | Incumbent re-elected. | ▌ ✓ Carrie Meek (Democratic); Uncontested |
| Florida 18 | R+11 | Ileana Ros-Lehtinen | Republican | 1989 | Incumbent re-elected. | ▌ ✓ Ileana Ros-Lehtinen (Republican); Uncontested |
| Florida 19 | D+14 | Robert Wexler | Democratic | 1996 | Incumbent re-elected. | ▌ ✓ Robert Wexler (Democratic); Uncontested |
| Florida 20 | D+9 | Peter Deutsch | Democratic | 1992 | Incumbent re-elected. | ▌ ✓ Peter Deutsch (Democratic); Uncontested |
| Florida 21 | R+10 | Lincoln Díaz-Balart | Republican | 1992 | Incumbent re-elected. | ▌ ✓ Lincoln Díaz-Balart (Republican) 75%; ▌Patrick Cusack (Democratic) 25% |
| Florida 22 | D+3 | Clay Shaw | Republican | 1980 | Incumbent re-elected. | ▌ ✓ Clay Shaw (Republican); Uncontested |
| Florida 23 | D+24 | Alcee Hastings | Democratic | 1992 | Incumbent re-elected. | ▌ ✓ Alcee Hastings (Democratic); Uncontested |

== Georgia ==
| District | | Incumbent | | | | Candidates |
| Location | 1997 PVI | Member | Party | First elected | Status | Candidates |
|---|---|---|---|---|---|---|
| Georgia 1 | R+6 | Jack Kingston | Republican | 1992 | Incumbent re-elected. | ▌ ✓ Jack Kingston (Republican); Uncontested |
| Georgia 2 | R+1 | Sanford Bishop | Democratic | 1992 | Incumbent re-elected. | ▌ ✓ Sanford Bishop (Democratic) 57%; ▌Joseph F. McCormick (Republican) 43% |
| Georgia 3 | R+9 | Mac Collins | Republican | 1992 | Incumbent re-elected. | ▌ ✓ Mac Collins (Republican); Uncontested |
| Georgia 4 | D+11 | Cynthia McKinney | Democratic | 1992 | Incumbent re-elected. | ▌ ✓ Cynthia McKinney (Democratic) 61%; ▌Sunny Warren (Republican) 39% |
| Georgia 5 | D+22 | John Lewis | Democratic | 1986 | Incumbent re-elected. | ▌ ✓ John Lewis (Democratic) 79%; ▌John Lewis Sr. (Republican) 21% |
| Georgia 6 | R+19 | Newt Gingrich | Republican | 1978 | Incumbent re-elected, but resigned. | ▌ ✓ Newt Gingrich (Republican) 71%; ▌Gary Pelphrey (Democratic) 29% |
| Georgia 7 | R+10 | Bob Barr | Republican | 1994 | Incumbent re-elected. | ▌ ✓ Bob Barr (Republican) 55%; ▌James Williams (Democratic) 45% |
| Georgia 8 | R+2 | Saxby Chambliss | Republican | 1994 | Incumbent re-elected. | ▌ ✓ Saxby Chambliss (Republican) 62%; ▌Ronald Cain (Democratic) 38% |
| Georgia 9 | R+14 | Nathan Deal | Republican | 1992 (Note: Deal was originally elected as a Democrat. He switched parties in April 1995.) | Incumbent re-elected. | ▌ ✓ Nathan Deal (Republican); Uncontested |
| Georgia 10 | R+3 | Charlie Norwood | Republican | 1994 | Incumbent re-elected. | ▌ ✓ Charlie Norwood (Republican) 59%; ▌Marion Freeman (Democratic) 41% |
| Georgia 11 | R+13 | John Linder | Republican | 1992 | Incumbent re-elected. | ▌ ✓ John Linder (Republican) 69%; ▌Vince Littman (Democratic) 31% |

== Hawaii ==
| District | | Incumbent | | | | Candidates |
| Location | 1997 PVI | Member | Party | First elected | Status | Candidates |
|---|---|---|---|---|---|---|
| Hawaii 1 | D+6 | Neil Abercrombie | Democratic | 1986 (Special); 1988 (Lost renomination); 1990 | Incumbent re-elected. | ▌ ✓ Neil Abercrombie (Democratic) 59.8%; ▌Gene Ward (Republican) 35.3%; ▌Nicholas Bedworth (Natural Law) 2% |
| Hawaii 2 | D+10 | Patsy Mink | Democratic | 1964; 1976 (Retired); 1990 (Special) | Incumbent re-elected. | ▌ ✓ Patsy Mink (Democratic) 66.3%; ▌Carol Douglass (Republican) 23.2%; ▌Noreen Leilehua Chun (Libertarian) 6.1% |

== Idaho ==
| District | | Incumbent | | | | Candidates |
| Location | 1997 PVI | Member | Party | First elected | Status | Candidates |
|---|---|---|---|---|---|---|
| Idaho 1 | R+13 | Helen Chenoweth | Republican | 1994 | Incumbent re-elected. | ▌ ✓ Helen Chenoweth (Republican) 55%; ▌Dan Williams (Democratic) 45% |
| Idaho 2 | R+17 | Mike Crapo | Republican | 1992 | Incumbent retired to run for U.S. Senator. Republican hold. | ▌ ✓ Mike Simpson (Republican) 52.5%; ▌Richard H. Stallings (Democratic) 44.7%; ▌Jonathan B. Ratner (Natural Law) 2.8% |

== Illinois ==
| District | | Incumbent | | | | Candidates |
| Location | 1997 PVI | Member | Party | First elected | Status | Candidates |
|---|---|---|---|---|---|---|
| Illinois 1 | D+34 | Bobby Rush | Democratic | 1992 | Incumbent re-elected. | ▌ ✓ Bobby Rush (Democratic) 87.1%; ▌Marlene Ahimaz (Republican) 10.6%; ▌Marjorie Kohls (Libertarian) 2.3% |
| Illinois 2 | D+33 | Jesse Jackson Jr. | Democratic | 1995 | Incumbent re-elected. | ▌ ✓ Jesse Jackson Jr. (Democratic) 89.4%; ▌Robert Gordon (Republican) 9.6%; ▌Matthew Beauchamp (Libertarian) 1% |
| Illinois 3 | D+3 | Bill Lipinski | Democratic | 1982 | Incumbent re-elected. | ▌ ✓ Bill Lipinski (Democratic) 72.5%; ▌Robert Marshall (Republican) 27.5% |
| Illinois 4 | D+28 | Luis Gutiérrez | Democratic | 1992 | Incumbent re-elected. | ▌ ✓ Luis Gutiérrez (Democratic) 81.7%; ▌John Birch (Republican) 15.9%; ▌William Passmore (Libertarian) 2.4% |
| Illinois 5 | D+12 | Rod Blagojevich | Democratic | 1996 | Incumbent re-elected. | ▌ ✓ Rod Blagojevich (Democratic) 74%; ▌Alan Spitz (Republican) 26% |
| Illinois 6 | R+9 | Henry Hyde | Republican | 1974 | Incumbent re-elected. | ▌ ✓ Henry Hyde (Republican) 67.3%; ▌Thomas Cramer (Democratic) 30.1%; ▌George Meyers (Libertarian) 2.5% |
| Illinois 7 | D+31 | Danny K. Davis | Democratic | 1996 | Incumbent re-elected. | ▌ ✓ Danny K. Davis (Democratic) 92.9%; ▌Dorn Van Cleave (Libertarian) 7.1% |
| Illinois 8 | R+11 | Phil Crane | Republican | 1969 | Incumbent re-elected. | ▌ ✓ Phil Crane (Republican) 68.6%; ▌Mike Rothman (Democratic) 31.4% |
| Illinois 9 | D+17 | Sidney R. Yates | Democratic | 1948; 1962 (retired); 1964 | Incumbent retired. Democratic hold. | ▌ ✓ Jan Schakowsky (Democratic) 74.6%; ▌Herbert Sohn (Republican) 23.1%; ▌Michael Ray (Libertarian) 2.3% |
| Illinois 10 | R+2 | John Porter | Republican | 1980 | Incumbent re-elected. | ▌ ✓ John Porter (Republican); Uncontested |
| Illinois 11 | D+2 | Jerry Weller | Republican | 1994 | Incumbent re-elected. | ▌ ✓ Jerry Weller (Republican) 58.8%; ▌Gary Mueller (Democratic) 41.2% |
| Illinois 12 | D+9 | Jerry Costello | Democratic | 1988 | Incumbent re-elected. | ▌ ✓ Jerry Costello (Democratic) 60.4%; ▌William Price (Republican) 39.6% |
| Illinois 13 | R+10 | Harris W. Fawell | Republican | 1984 | Incumbent retired. Republican hold. | ▌ ✓ Judy Biggert (Republican) 61%; ▌Susan Hynes (Democratic) 39% |
| Illinois 14 | R+9 | Dennis Hastert | Republican | 1986 | Incumbent re-elected. | ▌ ✓ Dennis Hastert (Republican) 69.8%; ▌Robert Cozzi (Democratic) 30.2% |
| Illinois 15 | R+4 | Tom Ewing | Republican | 1991 | Incumbent re-elected. | ▌ ✓ Tom Ewing (Republican) 61.6%; ▌Laurel Lunt Prussing (Democratic) 38.4% |
| Illinois 16 | R+7 | Don Manzullo | Republican | 1992 | Incumbent re-elected. | ▌ ✓ Don Manzullo (Republican); Uncontested |
| Illinois 17 | D+3 | Lane Evans | Democratic | 1982 | Incumbent re-elected. | ▌ ✓ Lane Evans (Democratic) 51.6%; ▌Mark Baker (Republican) 48.4% |
| Illinois 18 | R+5 | Ray LaHood | Republican | 1994 | Incumbent re-elected. | ▌ ✓ Ray LaHood (Republican); Uncontested |
| Illinois 19 | Even | Glenn Poshard | Democratic | 1988 | Incumbent retired to run for Governor. Democratic hold. | ▌ ✓ David Phelps (Democratic) 58.3%; ▌Brent Winters (Republican) 41.7% |
| Illinois 20 | Even | John Shimkus | Republican | 1996 | Incumbent re-elected. | ▌ ✓ John Shimkus (Republican) 61.3%; ▌Rick Verticchio (Democratic) 38.7% |

== Indiana ==
| District | | Incumbent | | | | Candidates |
| Location | 1997 PVI | Member | Party | First elected | Status | Candidates |
|---|---|---|---|---|---|---|
| Indiana 1 | D+10 | Pete Visclosky | Democratic | 1984 | Incumbent re-elected. | ▌ ✓ Pete Visclosky (Democratic) 72.5%; ▌Michael Petyo (Republican) 26.2%; ▌Michael Crass (Libertarian) 1.3% |
| Indiana 2 | R+7 | David McIntosh | Republican | 1994 | Incumbent re-elected. | ▌ ✓ David McIntosh (Republican) 60.6%; ▌Sherman Boles (Democratic) 38%; ▌Cliff Federle (Libertarian) 1.4% |
| Indiana 3 | R+6 | Tim Roemer | Democratic | 1990 | Incumbent re-elected. | ▌ ✓ Tim Roemer (Democratic) 58.1%; ▌Daniel Holtz (Republican) 41.9% |
| Indiana 4 | R+14 | Mark Souder | Republican | 1994 | Incumbent re-elected. | ▌ ✓ Mark Souder (Republican) 63.3%; ▌Mark Wehrle (Democratic) 36.7% |
| Indiana 5 | R+12 | Steve Buyer | Republican | 1992 | Incumbent re-elected. | ▌ ✓ Steve Buyer (Republican) 62.6%; ▌David Steele III (Democratic) 36%; ▌Carl D. Waters (Libertarian) 1.4% |
| Indiana 6 | R+24 | Dan Burton | Republican | 1982 | Incumbent re-elected. | ▌ ✓ Dan Burton (Republican) 72%; ▌Bob Kern (Democratic) 16.8%; ▌Joe Hauptmann (Libertarian) 11.2% |
| Indiana 7 | R+14 | Edward Pease | Republican | 1996 | Incumbent re-elected. | ▌ ✓ Edward Pease (Republican) 68.9%; ▌Samuel Hillenburg (Democratic) 28.1%; ▌Barbara Bourland (Libertarian) 3% |
| Indiana 8 | R+3 | John Hostettler | Republican | 1994 | Incumbent re-elected. | ▌ ✓ John Hostettler (Republican) 52.1%; ▌Gail Riecken (Democratic) 46%; ▌Paul Hager (Libertarian) 1.9% |
| Indiana 9 | R+4 | Lee Hamilton | Democratic | 1964 | Incumbent retired. Democratic hold. | ▌ ✓ Baron Hill (Democratic) 50.8%; ▌Jean Leising (Republican) 47.9%; ▌Diane L. Feeney (Libertarian) 1.3% |
| Indiana 10 | D+4 | Julia Carson | Democratic | 1996 | Incumbent re-elected. | ▌ ✓ Julia Carson (Democratic) 58.3%; ▌Gary Hofmeister (Republican) 39.4%; ▌Na' Ilah Ali (Libertarian) 2.3% |

== Iowa ==
| District | | Incumbent | | | | Candidates |
| Location | 1997 PVI | Member | Party | First elected | Status | Candidates |
|---|---|---|---|---|---|---|
| Iowa 1 | D+5 | Jim Leach | Republican | 1976 | Incumbent re-elected. | ▌ ✓ Jim Leach (Republican) 56.5%; ▌Bob Rush (Democratic) 42.3%; ▌Charles Thurston (Reform) 0.7%; ▌Jeffrey M. Smith (Natural Law) 0.5% |
| Iowa 2 | D+4 | Jim Nussle | Republican | 1990 | Incumbent re-elected. | ▌ ✓ Jim Nussle (Republican) 55.2%; ▌Rob Tully (Democratic) 44%; ▌Peter Lamoureux (Natural Law) 0.8% |
| Iowa 3 | D+2 | Leonard Boswell | Democratic | 1996 | Incumbent re-elected. | ▌ ✓ Leonard Boswell (Democratic) 56.9%; ▌Larry McKibben (Republican) 41.1%; ▌Charles Connolly (Reform) 1.1%; ▌Joe Seehusen (Independent) 0.8% |
| Iowa 4 | R+1 | Greg Ganske | Republican | 1994 | Incumbent re-elected. | ▌ ✓ Greg Ganske (Republican) 65.2%; ▌Jon Dvorak (Democratic) 33.9%; ▌Steven Yellin (Natural Law) 0.9% |
| Iowa 5 | R+5 | Tom Latham | Republican | 1994 | Incumbent re-elected. | ▌ ✓ Tom Latham (Republican); Uncontested |

== Kansas ==
| District | | Incumbent | | | | Candidates |
| Location | 1997 PVI | Member | Party | First elected | Status | Candidates |
|---|---|---|---|---|---|---|
| Kansas 1 | R+21 | Jerry Moran | Republican | 1996 | Incumbent re-elected. | ▌ ✓ Jerry Moran (Republican) 80.7%; ▌Jim Phillips (Democratic) 19.3% |
| Kansas 2 | R+9 | Jim Ryun | Republican | 1996 | Incumbent re-elected. | ▌ ✓ Jim Ryun (Republican) 61%; ▌Jim Clark (Democratic) 39% |
| Kansas 3 | R+8 | Vince Snowbarger | Republican | 1996 | Incumbent lost re-election. Democratic gain. | ▌ ✓ Dennis Moore (Democratic) 52.4%; ▌Vince Snowbarger (Republican) 47.6% |
| Kansas 4 | R+14 | Todd Tiahrt | Republican | 1994 | Incumbent re-elected. | ▌ ✓ Todd Tiahrt (Republican) 58.2%; ▌Jim Lawing (Democratic) 38.6%; ▌Craig Newland (U.S. Taxpayers) 3.2% |

== Kentucky ==
| District | | Incumbent | | | | Candidates |
| Location | 1997 PVI | Member | Party | First elected | Status | Candidates |
|---|---|---|---|---|---|---|
| Kentucky 1 | R+2 | Ed Whitfield | Republican | 1994 | Incumbent re-elected. | ▌ ✓ Ed Whitfield (Republican) 55.2%; ▌Tom Barlow (Democratic) 44.8% |
| Kentucky 2 | R+8 | Ron Lewis | Republican | 1994 | Incumbent re-elected. | ▌ ✓ Ron Lewis (Republican) 63.7%; ▌Bob Evans (Democratic) 35.3%; ▌Jim Ketchel (Reform) 1% |
| Kentucky 3 | D+3 | Anne Northup | Republican | 1996 | Incumbent re-elected. | ▌ ✓ Anne Northup (Republican) 51.5%; ▌Chris Gorman (Democratic) 47.5%; ▌Patricia Jo Metten (Natural Law) 1% |
| Kentucky 4 | R+9 | Jim Bunning | Republican | 1986 | Incumbent retired to run for U.S. Senator. Democratic gain. | ▌ ✓ Ken Lucas (Democratic) 53.4%; ▌Gex Williams (Republican) 46.6% |
| Kentucky 5 | R+2 | Hal Rogers | Republican | 1980 | Incumbent re-elected. | ▌ ✓ Hal Rogers (Republican) 78.2%; ▌Sidney Bailey-Bamer (Democratic) 21.8% |
| Kentucky 6 | R+4 | Scotty Baesler | Democratic | 1992 | Incumbent retired to run for U.S. Senator. Republican gain. | ▌ ✓ Ernie Fletcher (Republican) 53.1%; ▌Ernesto Scorsone (Democratic) 46%; ▌Wasley Krogdahl (U.S. Taxpayers) 0.9% |

== Louisiana ==
| District | | Incumbent | | | | Candidates |
| Location | 1997 PVI | Member | Party | First elected | Status | Candidates |
|---|---|---|---|---|---|---|
| Louisiana 1 | R+16 | Bob Livingston | Republican | 1977 (Special) | Incumbent re-elected. | ▌ ✓ Bob Livingston (Republican); Uncontested |
| Louisiana 2 | D+24 | William J. Jefferson | Democratic | 1990 | Incumbent re-elected. | ▌ ✓ William J. Jefferson (Democratic) 86% |
| Louisiana 3 | D+1 | Billy Tauzin | Republican | 1980 (Note: Tauzin was first elected as a Democrat. He switched to the Republican Party in August 1995.) | Incumbent re-elected. | ▌ ✓ Billy Tauzin (Republican); Uncontested |
| Louisiana 4 | D+1 | Jim McCrery | Republican | 1988 | Incumbent re-elected. | ▌ ✓ Jim McCrery (Republican); Uncontested |
| Louisiana 5 | R+2 | John Cooksey | Republican | 1996 | Incumbent re-elected. | ▌ ✓ John Cooksey (Republican); Uncontested |
| Louisiana 6 | R+1 | Richard Baker | Republican | 1986 | Incumbent re-elected. | ▌ ✓ Richard Baker (Republican) 51%; ▌Marjorie McKeithen (Democratic) 49% |
| Louisiana 7 | D+5 | Chris John | Democratic | 1996 | Incumbent re-elected. | ▌ ✓ Chris John (Democratic); Uncontested |

== Maine ==
| District | | Incumbent | | | | Candidates |
| Location | 1997 PVI | Member | Party | First elected | Status | Candidates |
|---|---|---|---|---|---|---|
| Maine 1 | D+6 | Tom Allen | Democratic | 1996 | Incumbent re-elected. | ▌ ✓ Tom Allen (Democratic) 60.3%; ▌Ross Connelly (Republican) 35.5%; ▌Eric Greiner (U.S. Taxpayers) 4.1% |
| Maine 2 | D+7 | John Baldacci | Democratic | 1994 | Incumbent re-elected. | ▌ ✓ John Baldacci (Democratic) 76.2%; ▌Johnathan Reisman (Republican) 23.8% |

== Maryland ==
| District | | Incumbent | | | | Candidates |
| Location | 1997 PVI | Member | Party | First elected | Status | Candidates |
|---|---|---|---|---|---|---|
| Maryland 1 | R+7 | Wayne Gilchrest | Republican | 1990 | Incumbent re-elected. | ▌ ✓ Wayne Gilchrest (Republican) 69%; ▌Irving Pinder (Democratic) 31% |
| Maryland 2 | R+10 | Bob Ehrlich | Republican | 1994 | Incumbent re-elected. | ▌ ✓ Bob Ehrlich (Republican) 69%; ▌Kenneth Bosley (Democratic) 31% |
| Maryland 3 | D+9 | Ben Cardin | Democratic | 1986 | Incumbent re-elected. | ▌ ✓ Ben Cardin (Democratic) 78%; ▌Colin Harby (Republican) 22% |
| Maryland 4 | D+28 | Albert Wynn | Democratic | 1992 | Incumbent re-elected. | ▌ ✓ Albert Wynn (Democratic) 86%; ▌John Kimble (Republican) 14% |
| Maryland 5 | Even | Steny Hoyer | Democratic | 1981 | Incumbent re-elected. | ▌ ✓ Steny Hoyer (Democratic) 66%; ▌Robert Ostrom (Republican) 34% |
| Maryland 6 | R+12 | Roscoe Bartlett | Republican | 1992 | Incumbent re-elected. | ▌ ✓ Roscoe Bartlett (Republican) 63%; ▌Timothy McCown (Democratic) 37% |
| Maryland 7 | D+30 | Elijah Cummings | Democratic | 1996 | Incumbent re-elected. | ▌ ✓ Elijah Cummings (Democratic) 86%; ▌Kenneth Kondner (Republican) 14% |
| Maryland 8 | D+6 | Connie Morella | Republican | 1986 | Incumbent re-elected. | ▌ ✓ Connie Morella (Republican) 60%; ▌Ralph Neas (Democratic) 40% |

== Massachusetts ==
| District | | Incumbent | | | | Candidates |
| Location | 1997 PVI | Member | Party | First elected | Status | Candidates |
|---|---|---|---|---|---|---|
| Massachusetts 1 | D+14 | John Olver | Democratic | 1991 | Incumbent re-elected. | ▌ ✓ John Olver (Democratic) 71.7%; ▌Gregory Morgan (Republican) 28.3% |
| Massachusetts 2 | D+13 | Richard Neal | Democratic | 1988 | Incumbent re-elected. | ▌ ✓ Richard Neal (Democratic) 99%; Uncontested |
| Massachusetts 3 | D+11 | Jim McGovern | Democratic | 1996 | Incumbent re-elected. | ▌ ✓ Jim McGovern (Democratic) 56.9%; ▌Matthew J. Amorello (Republican) 41.5%; ▌George Phillies (Libertarian) 1.5% |
| Massachusetts 4 | D+15 | Barney Frank | Democratic | 1980 | Incumbent re-elected. | ▌ ✓ Barney Frank (Democratic) 98.4%; Uncontested |
| Massachusetts 5 | D+9 | Marty Meehan | Democratic | 1992 | Incumbent re-elected. | ▌ ✓ Marty Meehan (Democratic) 70.7%; ▌David Coleman (Republican) 29.3% |
| Massachusetts 6 | D+9 | John F. Tierney | Democratic | 1996 | Incumbent re-elected. | ▌ ✓ John F. Tierney (Democratic) 54.6%; ▌Peter G. Torkildsen (Republican) 42.4%; ▌Randal C. Fritz (Independent) 3% |
| Massachusetts 7 | D+14 | Ed Markey | Democratic | 1976 | Incumbent re-elected. | ▌ ✓ Ed Markey (Democratic) 70.6%; ▌Patricia Long (Republican) 29.3% |
| Massachusetts 8 | D+27 | Joseph P. Kennedy II | Democratic | 1986 | Incumbent retired. Democratic hold. | ▌ ✓ Mike Capuano (Democratic) 81.7%; ▌Philip Hyde (Republican) 11.5%; ▌Andrea Morell (Socialist Workers) 4%; ▌Anthony A. Schinella (Independent) 2.8% |
| Massachusetts 9 | D+11 | Joe Moakley | Democratic | 1972 | Incumbent re-elected. | ▌ ✓ Joe Moakley (Democratic) 99.4%; Uncontested |
| Massachusetts 10 | D+7 | Bill Delahunt | Democratic | 1996 | Incumbent re-elected. | ▌ ✓ Bill Delahunt (Democratic) 70%; ▌Eric Bleicken (Republican) 29.9% |

== Michigan ==
| District | | Incumbent | | | | Candidates |
| Location | 1997 PVI | Member | Party | First elected | Status | Candidates |
|---|---|---|---|---|---|---|
| Michigan 1 | R+1 | Bart Stupak | Democratic | 1992 | Incumbent re-elected. | ▌ ✓ Bart Stupak (Democratic) 58.7%; ▌Michelle McManus (Republican) 39.5%; ▌John W. Loosemore (Libertarian) 1%; ▌Wendy Conway (Natural Law) 0.8% |
| Michigan 2 | R+10 | Pete Hoekstra | Republican | 1992 | Incumbent re-elected. | ▌ ✓ Pete Hoekstra (Republican) 68.7%; ▌Bob Shrauger (Democratic) 29.8%; ▌Bruce A. Smith (Libertarian) 1%; ▌Tom Russell (Natural Law) 0.5% |
| Michigan 3 | R+12 | Vern Ehlers | Republican | 1993 | Incumbent re-elected. | ▌ ✓ Vern Ehlers (Republican) 73%; ▌John Ferguson (Democratic) 24.7%; ▌Erwin J. Haas (Libertarian) 1.3%; ▌Lucille Wiggins (Natural Law) 1% |
| Michigan 4 | R+2 | Dave Camp | Republican | 1990 | Incumbent re-elected. | ▌ ✓ Dave Camp (Republican) 91.3%; ▌Dan Marsh (Libertarian) 6.1%; ▌Stuart Goldberg (Natural Law) 2.5% |
| Michigan 5 | D+8 | James Barcia | Democratic | 1992 | Incumbent re-elected. | ▌ ✓ James Barcia (Democratic) 71.2%; ▌Donald Brewster (Republican) 27.1%; ▌Clint Foster (Libertarian) 1.1%; ▌Brian D. Ellison (Natural Law) 0.6% |
| Michigan 6 | R+4 | Fred Upton | Republican | 1986 | Incumbent re-elected. | ▌ ✓ Fred Upton (Republican) 70.1%; ▌Clarence Annen (Democratic) 28.1%; ▌Glenn Douglas Whitt Jr. (Libertarian) 1.1%; ▌Ken Asmus (Natural Law) 0.7% |
| Michigan 7 | R+3 | Nick Smith | Republican | 1992 | Incumbent re-elected. | ▌ ✓ Nick Smith (Republican) 57.4%; ▌Jim Berryman (Democratic) 40.1%; ▌Ken Proctor (Libertarian) 1.5%; ▌Lynnea Ellison (Natural Law) 1% |
| Michigan 8 | Even | Debbie Stabenow | Democratic | 1996 | Incumbent re-elected. | ▌ ✓ Debbie Stabenow (Democratic) 57.4%; ▌Susan Munsell (Republican) 38.6%; ▌John Mangopoulos (Reform) 2.1%; ▌Ben Steele III (Libertarian) 1.3%; ▌Patricia R. Allen (Natural Law) 0.6% |
| Michigan 9 | R+2 | Dale Kildee | Democratic | 1976 | Incumbent re-elected. | ▌ ✓ Dale Kildee (Democratic) 55.9%; ▌Tom McMillin (Republican) 41.9%; ▌Malcolm Johnson (Libertarian) 2.2% |
| Michigan 10 | R+1 | David Bonior | Democratic | 1976 | Incumbent re-elected. | ▌ ✓ David Bonior (Democratic) 52.4%; ▌Brian Palmer (Republican) 45.3%; ▌R. Friend (Libertarian) 1.6%; ▌Henry Ogden Clark (Natural Law) 0.6% |
| Michigan 11 | R+6 | Joe Knollenberg | Republican | 1992 | Incumbent re-elected. | ▌ ✓ Joe Knollenberg (Republican) 63.9%; ▌Travis Reeds (Democratic) 33.7%; ▌Dick Gach (Libertarian) 2.4% |
| Michigan 12 | D+1 | Sander Levin | Democratic | 1982 | Incumbent re-elected. | ▌ ✓ Sander Levin (Democratic) 55.9%; ▌Leslie Touma (Republican) 42%; ▌Albert J. Titran (Libertarian) 1.5%; ▌Fred D. Rosenberg (Natural Law) 0.6% |
| Michigan 13 | D+8 | Lynn Rivers | Democratic | 1994 | Incumbent re-elected. | ▌ ✓ Lynn Rivers (Democratic) 58.1%; ▌Tom Hickey (Republican) 39.8%; ▌Dean Hutyra (Libertarian) 1.7%; ▌Samir Roger Makarem (Natural Law) 0.4% |
| Michigan 14 | D+33 | John Conyers | Democratic | 1964 | Incumbent re-elected. | ▌ ✓ John Conyers (Democratic) 86.9%; ▌Vendella Collins (Republican) 11.1%; ▌Michael Freyman (Libertarian) 1.2%; ▌Richard R. Miller (Natural Law) 0.7% |
| Michigan 15 | D+34 | Carolyn Cheeks Kilpatrick | Democratic | 1996 | Incumbent re-elected. | ▌ ✓ Carolyn Cheeks Kilpatrick (Democratic) 87%; ▌Chrysanthea Boyd-Fields (Republican) 10.3%; ▌Linda S. Willey (Libertarian) 1.2%; Others: ▌Gregory F. Smith (Natural Law) 0.9%; ▌Holly Harkness (Independent) 0.6% |
| Michigan 16 | D+5 | John Dingell | Democratic | 1955 | Incumbent re-elected. | ▌ ✓ John Dingell (Democratic) 66.6%; ▌William Morse (Republican) 31%; ▌Edward Hlavac (Libertarian) 1.8%; ▌Noha Hamze (Natural Law) 0.6% |

== Minnesota ==
| District | | Incumbent | | | | Candidates |
| Location | 1997 PVI | Member | Party | First elected | Status | Candidates |
|---|---|---|---|---|---|---|
| Minnesota 1 | D+1 | Gil Gutknecht | Republican | 1994 | Incumbent re-elected. | ▌ ✓ Gil Gutknecht (Republican) 54.7%; ▌Tracy Beckman (DFL) 45.2% |
| Minnesota 2 | R+2 | David Minge | DFL | 1992 | Incumbent re-elected. | ▌ ✓ David Minge (DFL) 57%; ▌Craig W. Duehring (Republican) 38.1%; ▌Stan Bentz (Reform) 4.7% |
| Minnesota 3 | R+2 | Jim Ramstad | Republican | 1990 | Incumbent re-elected. | ▌ ✓ Jim Ramstad (Republican) 71.9%; ▌Stan Leino (DFL) 23.5%; ▌Derek Schramm (Minnesota Taxpayers) 4.5% |
| Minnesota 4 | D+12 | Bruce Vento | DFL | 1976 | Incumbent re-elected. | ▌ ✓ Bruce Vento (DFL) 53.7%; ▌Dennis Newinski (Republican) 39.8%; ▌Dan R. Vacek (Legal Marijuana Now) 2.4%; ▌Carol S. Schulstad (Minnesota Taxpayers) 1.9%; ▌Michael A. Neitzel (Libertarian) 1.2%; ▌Heather Wood (Socialist Workers) 0.9% |
| Minnesota 5 | D+17 | Martin Olav Sabo | DFL | 1978 | Incumbent re-elected. | ▌ ✓ Martin Olav Sabo (DFL) 66.9%; ▌Frank Taylor (Republican) 27.6%; ▌Kevin Houston (Libertarian) 3.4%; ▌Michael Pennock (Socialist Workers) 1.4%; ▌Jason Kassel (Anti-Federalist) 0.7% |
| Minnesota 6 | D+3 | Bill Luther | DFL | 1994 | Incumbent re-elected. | ▌ ✓ Bill Luther (DFL) 50%; ▌John Kline (Republican) 46%; ▌Eric M. Johnson (Libertarian) 4% |
| Minnesota 7 | R+2 | Collin Peterson | DFL | 1990 | Incumbent re-elected. | ▌ ✓ Collin Peterson (DFL) 71.7%; ▌Jerry Shuster (Republican) 28.1% |
| Minnesota 8 | D+9 | Jim Oberstar | DFL | 1974 | Incumbent re-elected. | ▌ ✓ Jim Oberstar (DFL) 66%; ▌Jerry Shuster (Republican) 26.5%; ▌Stan Estes (Reform) 5.8%; ▌Larry Fuhol (Libertarian) 1.7% |

== Mississippi ==
| District | | Incumbent | | | | Candidates |
| Location | 1997 PVI | Member | Party | First elected | Status | Candidates |
|---|---|---|---|---|---|---|
| Mississippi 1 | R+8 | Roger Wicker | Republican | 1994 | Incumbent re-elected. | ▌ ✓ Roger Wicker (Republican) 67.2%; ▌Rex Weathers (Democratic) 30.6%; ▌John Rouse (Libertarian) 2.2% |
| Mississippi 2 | D+9 | Bennie Thompson | Democratic | 1993 | Incumbent re-elected. | ▌ ✓ Bennie Thompson (Democratic) 71.2%; ▌Will Chipman (Libertarian) 28.8% |
| Mississippi 3 | R+17 | Chip Pickering | Republican | 1996 | Incumbent re-elected. | ▌ ✓ Chip Pickering (Republican) 84.6%; ▌Charles Scarborough (Libertarian) 15.4% |
| Mississippi 4 | R+6 | Michael Parker | Republican | 1988 (Note: Parker was originally elected as a Democrat. He switched parties in November 1995.) | Incumbent retired to run for Governor. Democratic gain. | ▌ ✓ Ronnie Shows (Democratic) 54%; ▌Delbert Hosemann (Republican) 46%; ▌Bill Fausek (Libertarian) 0.7%; ▌Vince Thornton (U.S. Taxpayers) 0.6%; ▌Kenneth Welch (Reform) 0.5% |
| Mississippi 5 | R+16 | Gene Taylor | Democratic | 1989 | Incumbent re-elected. | ▌ ✓ Gene Taylor (Democratic) 77.8%; ▌Randy McDonnell (Republican) 19.1%; ▌Ray Coffey (Libertarian) 1.5%; ▌Robert Claunch (Reform) 1.1%; ▌Philip Mayeux (Natural Law) 0.5% |

== Missouri ==
| District | | Incumbent | | | | Candidates |
| Location | 1997 PVI | Member | Party | First elected | Status | Candidates |
|---|---|---|---|---|---|---|
| Missouri 1 | D+24 | Bill Clay | Democratic | 1968 | Incumbent re-elected. | ▌ ✓ Bill Clay (Democratic) 72.6%; ▌Richmond Soluade (Republican) 24.5%; ▌Richard Illyes (Libertarian) 2.9% |
| Missouri 2 | R+8 | Jim Talent | Republican | 1992 | Incumbent re-elected. | ▌ ✓ Jim Talent (Republican) 70%; ▌John Ross (Democratic) 28.3%; ▌Brian Lundy (Libertarian) 1.6% |
| Missouri 3 | D+2 | Dick Gephardt | Democratic | 1976 | Incumbent re-elected. | ▌ ✓ Dick Gephardt (Democratic) 55.8%; ▌Bill Federer (Republican) 42%; ▌Michael Crist (Libertarian) 1.3%; Joseph Keller (U.S. Taxpayers) 0.9% |
| Missouri 4 | R+7 | Ike Skelton | Democratic | 1976 | Incumbent re-elected. | ▌ ✓ Ike Skelton (Democratic) 71%; ▌Cecilia Noland (Republican) 27.2%; ▌Edwin Hoag (Libertarian) 1.8% |
| Missouri 5 | D+10 | Karen McCarthy | Democratic | 1994 | Incumbent re-elected. | ▌ ✓ Karen McCarthy (Democratic) 65.9%; ▌Penny Bennett (Republican) 31%; ▌Grant Stauffer (Libertarian) 1.7%; ▌Elizabeth Dulaney (Reform) 1.4% |
| Missouri 6 | R+1 | Pat Danner | Democratic | 1992 | Incumbent re-elected. | ▌ ✓ Pat Danner (Democratic) 71%; ▌Jeff Bailey (Republican) 26.8%; ▌Karl Wetzel (Libertarian) 2.2% |
| Missouri 7 | R+12 | Roy Blunt | Republican | 1996 | Incumbent re-elected. | ▌ ✓ Roy Blunt (Republican) 72.6%; ▌Marc Perkel (Democratic) 24.3%; ▌Mike Harman (Libertarian) 3.2% |
| Missouri 8 | R+2 | Jo Ann Emerson | Republican | 1996 | Incumbent re-elected. | ▌ ✓ Jo Ann Emerson (Republican) 62.6%; ▌Anthony Heckemeyer (Democratic) 35.7%; ▌John Hendricks (Libertarian) 1.7% |
| Missouri 9 | R+2 | Kenny Hulshof | Republican | 1996 | Incumbent re-elected. | ▌ ✓ Kenny Hulshof (Republican) 62.2%; ▌Linda Vogt (Democratic) 35.5%; ▌Robert Hoffman (Libertarian) 2.3% |

== Montana ==
| District | | Incumbent | | | | Candidates |
| Location | 1997 PVI | Member | Party | First elected | Status | Candidates |
|---|---|---|---|---|---|---|
| Montana at-large | R+5 | Rick Hill | Republican | 1996 | Incumbent re-elected. | ▌ ✓ Rick Hill (Republican) 53%; ▌Robert Deschamps (Democratic) 44.4%; ▌Mike Fellows (Libertarian) 1.7%; ▌Webb Sullivan (Reform) 0.9% |

== Nebraska ==
| District | | Incumbent | | | | Candidates |
| Location | 1997 PVI | Member | Party | First elected | Status | Candidates |
|---|---|---|---|---|---|---|
| Nebraska 1 | R+11 | Doug Bereuter | Republican | 1978 | Incumbent re-elected. | ▌ ✓ Doug Bereuter (Republican) 73.5%; ▌Don Eret (Democratic) 26.4% |
| Nebraska 2 | R+13 | Jon Lynn Christensen | Republican | 1994 | Incumbent retired to run for Governor of Nebraska. Republican hold. | ▌ ✓ Lee Terry (Republican) 65.5%; ▌Michael Scott (Democratic) 34.2% |
| Nebraska 3 | R+22 | Bill Barrett | Republican | 1990 | Incumbent re-elected. | ▌ ✓ Bill Barrett (Republican) 84.3%; ▌Jerry Hickman (Libertarian) 15.3% |

== Nevada ==
| District | | Incumbent | | | | Candidates |
| Location | 1997 PVI | Member | Party | First elected | Status | Candidates |
|---|---|---|---|---|---|---|
| Nevada 1 | D+4 | John Ensign | Republican | 1994 | Incumbent retired to run for U.S. Senator. Democratic gain. | ▌ ✓ Shelley Berkley (Democratic) 49.2%; ▌Don Chairez (Republican) 45.7%; ▌Jim Burns (Libertarian) 3.3%; ▌Jess Howe (Independent American) 1.8% |
| Nevada 2 | R+9 | Jim Gibbons | Republican | 1996 | Incumbent re-elected. | ▌ ✓ Jim Gibbons (Republican) 81.1%; ▌Christopher Horne (Independent American) 8.3%; ▌Louis Tomburello (Libertarian) 7.5%; ▌Robert Winquist (Natural Law) 3.2% |

== New Hampshire ==
| District | | Incumbent | | | | Candidates |
| Location | 1997 PVI | Member | Party | First elected | Status | Candidates |
|---|---|---|---|---|---|---|
| New Hampshire 1 | R+1 | John E. Sununu | Republican | 1996 | Incumbent re-elected. | ▌ ✓ John E. Sununu (Republican) 66.9%; ▌Peter Flood (Democratic) 33.1% |
| New Hampshire 2 | D+1 | Charlie Bass | Republican | 1994 | Incumbent re-elected. | ▌ ✓ Charlie Bass (Republican) 53.2%; ▌Mary Rauh (Democratic) 44.8%; ▌Paula Werme (Libertarian) 2% |

== New Jersey ==
| District | | Incumbent | | | | Candidates |
| Location | 1997 PVI | Member | Party | First elected | Status | Candidates |
|---|---|---|---|---|---|---|
| New Jersey 1 | D+12 | Rob Andrews | Democratic | 1990 | Incumbent re-elected. | ▌ ✓ Rob Andrews (Democratic) 74%; ▌Ronald Richards (Republican) 23% |
| New Jersey 2 | D+2 | Frank LoBiondo | Republican | 1994 | Incumbent re-elected. | ▌ ✓ Frank LoBiondo (Republican) 66%; ▌Derek Hunsberger (Democratic) 31% |
| New Jersey 3 | D+1 | Jim Saxton | Republican | 1984 | Incumbent re-elected. | ▌ ✓ Jim Saxton (Republican) 62%; ▌Steven Polansky (Democratic) 36% |
| New Jersey 4 | D+1 | Chris Smith | Republican | 1980 | Incumbent re-elected. | ▌ ✓ Chris Smith (Republican) 63%; ▌Larry Schneider (Democratic) 35% |
| New Jersey 5 | R+9 | Marge Roukema | Republican | 1980 | Incumbent re-elected. | ▌ ✓ Marge Roukema (Republican) 64%; ▌Mike Schneider (Democratic) 33% |
| New Jersey 6 | D+5 | Frank Pallone | Democratic | 1988 | Incumbent re-elected. | ▌ ✓ Frank Pallone (Democratic) 57%; ▌Mike Ferguson (Republican) 41%; ▌Carl Mayer (Independent) 1% |
| New Jersey 7 | Even | Bob Franks | Republican | 1992 | Incumbent re-elected. | ▌ ✓ Bob Franks (Republican) 53%; ▌Maryanne Connelly (Democratic) 45% |
| New Jersey 8 | D+6 | Bill Pascrell | Democratic | 1996 | Incumbent re-elected. | ▌ ✓ Bill Pascrell (Democratic) 62%; ▌Matthew Kirnan (Republican) 36% |
| New Jersey 9 | D+9 | Steve Rothman | Democratic | 1996 | Incumbent re-elected. | ▌ ✓ Steve Rothman (Democratic) 65%; ▌Steve Lonegan (Republican) 34% |
| New Jersey 10 | D+30 | Donald M. Payne | Democratic | 1988 | Incumbent re-elected. | ▌ ✓ Donald M. Payne (Democratic) 84%; ▌William Wnuck (Republican) 11% |
| New Jersey 11 | R+10 | Rodney Frelinghuysen | Republican | 1994 | Incumbent re-elected. | ▌ ✓ Rodney Frelinghuysen (Republican) 68%; ▌John Scollo (Democratic) 30% |
| New Jersey 12 | R+2 | Mike Pappas | Republican | 1996 | Incumbent lost re-election. Democratic gain. | ▌ ✓ Rush Holt Jr. (Democratic) 51%; ▌Mike Pappas (Republican) 48% |
| New Jersey 13 | D+18 | Bob Menendez | Democratic | 1992 | Incumbent re-elected. | ▌ ✓ Bob Menendez (Democratic) 81%; ▌Theresa de Leon (Republican) 17% |

== New Mexico ==
| District | | Incumbent | | | | Candidates |
| Location | 1997 PVI | Member | Party | First elected | Status | Candidates |
|---|---|---|---|---|---|---|
| New Mexico 1 | R+1 | Heather Wilson | Republican | 1998 (special) | Incumbent re-elected. | ▌ ✓ Heather Wilson (Republican) 48.4%; ▌Phillip Maloof (Democratic) 41.9%; ▌Robert Anderson (Green) 9.6% |
| New Mexico 2 | R+4 | Joe Skeen | Republican | 1980 | Incumbent re-elected. | ▌ ✓ Joe Skeen (Republican) 57.9%; ▌Shirley Baca (Democratic) 42.1% |
| New Mexico 3 | D+4 | Bill Redmond | Republican | 1997 (special) | Incumbent lost re-election. Democratic gain. | ▌ ✓ Tom Udall (Democratic) 53.2%; ▌Bill Redmond (Republican) 43.2%; ▌Carol Miller (Green) 3.6% |

== New York ==
| District | | Incumbent | | | | Candidates |
| Location | 1997 PVI | Member | Party | First elected | Status | Candidates |
|---|---|---|---|---|---|---|
| New York 1 | D+2 | Michael Forbes | Republican | 1994 | Incumbent re-elected. | ▌ ✓ Michael Forbes (Republican) 64%; ▌William Holst (Democratic) 36% |
| New York 2 | D+4 | Rick Lazio | Republican | 1992 | Incumbent re-elected. | ▌ ✓ Rick Lazio (Republican) 67%; ▌John Bace (Democratic) 30% |
| New York 3 | D+2 | Peter King | Republican | 1992 | Incumbent re-elected. | ▌ ✓ Peter King (Republican) 65%; ▌Kevin Langberg (Democratic) 35% |
| New York 4 | D+5 | Carolyn McCarthy | Democratic | 1996 | Incumbent re-elected. | ▌ ✓ Carolyn McCarthy (Democratic) 53%; ▌Gregory R. Becker (Republican) 47% |
| New York 5 | D+9 | Gary Ackerman | Democratic | 1983 | Incumbent re-elected. | ▌ ✓ Gary Ackerman (Democratic) 65%; ▌David Pinzon (Republican) 34% |
| New York 6 | D+32 | Gregory Meeks | Democratic | 1998 (special) | Incumbent re-elected. | ▌ ✓ Gregory Meeks (Democratic); Uncontested |
| New York 7 | D+17 | Thomas J. Manton | Democratic | 1984 | Incumbent retired. Democratic hold. | ▌ ✓ Joe Crowley (Democratic) 68%; ▌James Dillon (Republican) 28% |
| New York 8 | D+28 | Jerry Nadler | Democratic | 1992 | Incumbent re-elected. | ▌ ✓ Jerry Nadler (Democratic) 86%; ▌Ted Howard (Republican) 14% |
| New York 9 | D+14 | Chuck Schumer | Democratic | 1980 | Incumbent retired to run for U.S. Senator. Democratic hold. | ▌ ✓ Anthony Weiner (Democratic) 66%; ▌Leslie Telano (Republican) 24% |
| New York 10 | D+37 | Edolphus Towns | Democratic | 1982 | Incumbent re-elected. | ▌ ✓ Edolphus Towns (Democratic) 92%; ▌Ernestine Brown (Republican) 7% |
| New York 11 | D+37 | Major Owens | Democratic | 1982 | Incumbent re-elected. | ▌ ✓ Major Owens (Democratic) 89%; ▌David Greene (Republican) 10% |
| New York 12 | D+29 | Nydia Velázquez | Democratic | 1992 | Incumbent re-elected. | ▌ ✓ Nydia Velázquez (Democratic) 83%; ▌Rosemarie Markgraf (Republican) 13% |
| New York 13 | R+1 | Vito Fossella | Republican | 1997 | Incumbent re-elected. | ▌ ✓ Vito Fossella (Republican) 66%; ▌Eugene Prisco (Democratic) 34% |
| New York 14 | D+21 | Carolyn Maloney | Democratic | 1992 | Incumbent re-elected. | ▌ ✓ Carolyn Maloney (Democratic) 77%; ▌Stephanie Kupferman (Republican) 23% |
| New York 15 | D+39 | Charles Rangel | Democratic | 1970 | Incumbent re-elected. | ▌ ✓ Charles Rangel (Democratic) 94%; ▌David Cunningham (Republican) 6% |
| New York 16 | D+39 | José E. Serrano | Democratic | 1990 | Incumbent re-elected. | ▌ ✓ José E. Serrano (Democratic) 96%; ▌Thomas Bayley (Republican) 4% |
| New York 17 | D+32 | Eliot Engel | Democratic | 1988 | Incumbent re-elected. | ▌ ✓ Eliot Engel (Democratic) 88%; ▌Peter Fiumefreddo (Republican) 12% |
| New York 18 | D+6 | Nita Lowey | Democratic | 1988 | Incumbent re-elected. | ▌ ✓ Nita Lowey (Democratic); Uncontested |
| New York 19 | R+2 | Sue Kelly | Republican | 1994 | Incumbent re-elected. | ▌ ✓ Sue Kelly (Republican) 63%; ▌Dick Collins (Democratic) 34% |
| New York 20 | D+3 | Benjamin Gilman | Republican | 1972 | Incumbent re-elected. | ▌ ✓ Benjamin Gilman (Republican) 58%; ▌Paul Feiner (Democratic) 40% |
| New York 21 | D+9 | Michael McNulty | Democratic | 1988 | Incumbent re-elected. | ▌ ✓ Michael McNulty (Democratic) 74%; ▌Lauren Ayers (Republican) 26% |
| New York 22 | R+3 | Gerald Solomon | Republican | 1978 | Incumbent retired. Republican hold. | ▌ ✓ John E. Sweeney (Republican) 56%; ▌Jean Bordewich (Democratic) 43% |
| New York 23 | R+2 | Sherwood Boehlert | Republican | 1982 | Incumbent re-elected. | ▌ ✓ Sherwood Boehlert (Republican); Uncontested |
| New York 24 | D+2 | John M. McHugh | Republican | 1992 | Incumbent re-elected. | ▌ ✓ John M. McHugh (Republican) 79%; ▌Neil Tallon (Democratic) 21% |
| New York 25 | D+2 | James T. Walsh | Republican | 1988 | Incumbent re-elected. | ▌ ✓ James T. Walsh (Republican) 69%; ▌Yvonne Rothenberg (Democratic) 31% |
| New York 26 | D+4 | Maurice Hinchey | Democratic | 1992 | Incumbent re-elected. | ▌ ✓ Maurice Hinchey (Democratic) 62%; ▌William Walker (Republican) 31%; ▌Randall Terry (Independent) 7% |
| New York 27 | R+6 | Bill Paxon | Republican | 1988 | Incumbent retired. Republican hold. | ▌ ✓ Thomas M. Reynolds (Republican) 58%; ▌Bill Cook (Democratic) 42% |
| New York 28 | D+4 | Louise Slaughter | Democratic | 1986 | Incumbent re-elected. | ▌ ✓ Louise Slaughter (Democratic) 65%; ▌Richard Kaplan (Republican) 31% |
| New York 29 | D+4 | John LaFalce | Democratic | 1974 | Incumbent re-elected. | ▌ ✓ John LaFalce (Democratic) 58%; ▌Chris Collins (Republican) 41% |
| New York 30 | D+11 | Jack Quinn | Republican | 1992 | Incumbent re-elected. | ▌ ✓ Jack Quinn (Republican) 68%; ▌Crystal Peoples (Democratic) 32% |
| New York 31 | R+4 | Amo Houghton | Republican | 1986 | Incumbent re-elected. | ▌ ✓ Amo Houghton (Republican) 69%; ▌Caleb Rossiter (Democratic) 25% |

== North Carolina ==
| District | | Incumbent | | | | Candidates |
| Location | 1997 PVI | Member | Party | First elected | Status | Candidates |
|---|---|---|---|---|---|---|
| North Carolina 1 | D+12 | Eva Clayton | Democratic | 1992 | Incumbent re-elected. | ▌ ✓ Eva Clayton (Democratic) 63%; ▌Ted Tyler (Republican) 37% |
| North Carolina 2 | R+9 | Bob Etheridge | Democratic | 1996 | Incumbent re-elected. | ▌ ✓ Bob Etheridge (Democratic) 58%; ▌Dan Page (Republican) 42% |
| North Carolina 3 | R+11 | Walter B. Jones Jr. | Republican | 1994 | Incumbent re-elected. | ▌ ✓ Walter B. Jones Jr. (Republican) 62%; ▌Jon Williams (Democratic) 38% |
| North Carolina 4 | R+2 | David Price | Democratic | 1986; 1994 (defeated); 1996 | Incumbent re-elected. | ▌ ✓ David Price (Democratic) 58%; ▌Tom Roberg (Republican) 42% |
| North Carolina 5 | R+8 | Richard Burr | Republican | 1994 | Incumbent re-elected. | ▌ ✓ Richard Burr (Republican) 68%; ▌Mike Robinson (Democratic) 32% |
| North Carolina 6 | R+18 | Howard Coble | Republican | 1984 | Incumbent re-elected. | ▌ ✓ Howard Coble (Republican) 88.6%; ▌Jeffrey D. Bentley (Libertarian) 11.4% |
| North Carolina 7 | R+6 | Mike McIntyre | Democratic | 1996 | Incumbent re-elected. | ▌ ✓ Mike McIntyre (Democratic) 91.3%; ▌Paul Meadows (Libertarian) 8.7% |
| North Carolina 8 | R+7 | Bill Hefner | Democratic | 1974 | Incumbent retired. Republican gain. | ▌ ✓ Robin Hayes (Republican) 51%; ▌Mike Taylor (Democratic) 49% |
| North Carolina 9 | R+14 | Sue Myrick | Republican | 1994 | Incumbent re-elected. | ▌ ✓ Sue Myrick (Republican) 69%; ▌Rory Blake (Democratic) 30% |
| North Carolina 10 | R+19 | Cass Ballenger | Republican | 1986 | Incumbent re-elected. | ▌ ✓ Cass Ballenger (Republican) 85.6%; ▌Deborah Garrett Eddins (Libertarian) 14.4% |
| North Carolina 11 | R+6 | Charles Taylor | Republican | 1990 | Incumbent re-elected. | ▌ ✓ Charles Taylor (Republican) 57%; ▌David Young (Democratic) 43% |
| North Carolina 12 | D+18 | Mel Watt | Democratic | 1992 | Incumbent re-elected. | ▌ ✓ Mel Watt (Democratic) 56%; ▌Scott Keadle (Republican) 43% |

== North Dakota ==
| District | | Incumbent | | | | Candidates |
| Location | 1997 PVI | Member | Party | First elected | Status | Candidates |
|---|---|---|---|---|---|---|
| North Dakota at-large | R+9 | Earl Pomeroy | Democratic-NPL | 1992 | Incumbent re-elected. | ▌ ✓ Earl Pomeroy (Democratic-NPL) 56.2%; ▌Kevin Cramer (Republican) 41.1%; ▌Kenneth R. Loughead (Independent) 2.7% |

== Ohio ==
| District | | Incumbent | | | | Candidates |
| Location | 1997 PVI | Member | Party | First elected | Status | Candidates |
|---|---|---|---|---|---|---|
| Ohio 1 | R+2 | Steve Chabot | Republican | 1994 | Incumbent re-elected. | ▌ ✓ Steve Chabot (Republican) 53%; ▌Roxanne Qualls (Democratic) 47% |
| Ohio 2 | R+18 | Rob Portman | Republican | 1993 | Incumbent re-elected. | ▌ ✓ Rob Portman (Republican) 76%; ▌Charles W. Sanders (Democratic) 24% |
| Ohio 3 | R+1 | Tony P. Hall | Democratic | 1978 | Incumbent re-elected. | ▌ ✓ Tony P. Hall (Democratic) 69%; ▌John Shondel (Republican) 31% |
| Ohio 4 | R+12 | Mike Oxley | Republican | 1981 | Incumbent re-elected. | ▌ ✓ Mike Oxley (Republican) 64%; ▌Paul McClain (Democratic) 36% |
| Ohio 5 | R+7 | Paul Gillmor | Republican | 1988 | Incumbent re-elected. | ▌ ✓ Paul Gillmor (Republican) 67%; ▌Susan Darrow (Democratic) 33% |
| Ohio 6 | R+4 | Ted Strickland | Democratic | 1992; 1994 (defeated); 1996 | Incumbent re-elected. | ▌ ✓ Ted Strickland (Democratic) 57%; ▌Nancy Hollister (Republican) 43% |
| Ohio 7 | R+9 | Dave Hobson | Republican | 1990 | Incumbent re-elected. | ▌ ✓ Dave Hobson (Republican) 68%; ▌Donald Minor (Democratic) 28% |
| Ohio 8 | R+14 | John Boehner | Republican | 1990 | Incumbent re-elected. | ▌ ✓ John Boehner (Republican) 71%; ▌John Griffin (Democratic) 29% |
| Ohio 9 | D+7 | Marcy Kaptur | Democratic | 1982 | Incumbent re-elected. | ▌ ✓ Marcy Kaptur (Democratic) 81%; ▌Edward Silvio Emery (Republican) 19% |
| Ohio 10 | D+3 | Dennis Kucinich | Democratic | 1996 | Incumbent re-elected. | ▌ ✓ Dennis Kucinich (Democratic) 67%; ▌Joe Slovenec (Republican) 33% |
| Ohio 11 | D+29 | Louis Stokes | Democratic | 1968 | Incumbent retired. Democratic hold. | ▌ ✓ Stephanie Tubbs Jones (Democratic) 80%; ▌James Hereford (Republican) 14% |
| Ohio 12 | R+4 | John Kasich | Republican | 1982 | Incumbent re-elected. | ▌ ✓ John Kasich (Republican) 67%; ▌Edward S. Brown (Democratic) 33% |
| Ohio 13 | R+1 | Sherrod Brown | Democratic | 1992 | Incumbent re-elected. | ▌ ✓ Sherrod Brown (Democratic) 62%; ▌Grace L. Drake (Republican) 38% |
| Ohio 14 | D+7 | Tom Sawyer | Democratic | 1986 | Incumbent re-elected. | ▌ ✓ Tom Sawyer (Democratic) 63%; ▌Tom Watkins (Republican) 37% |
| Ohio 15 | R+7 | Deborah Pryce | Republican | 1992 | Incumbent re-elected. | ▌ ✓ Deborah Pryce (Republican) 60%; ▌Adam Miller (Democratic) 27% |
| Ohio 16 | R+4 | Ralph Regula | Republican | 1972 | Incumbent re-elected. | ▌ ✓ Ralph Regula (Republican) 64%; ▌Peter Ferguson (Democratic) 36% |
| Ohio 17 | D+13 | James Traficant | Democratic | 1984 | Incumbent re-elected. | ▌ ✓ James Traficant (Democratic) 68%; ▌Paul Alberty (Republican) 32% |
| Ohio 18 | D+2 | Bob Ney | Republican | 1994 | Incumbent re-elected. | ▌ ✓ Bob Ney (Republican) 60%; ▌Rob Burch (Democratic) 40% |
| Ohio 19 | Even | Steve LaTourette | Republican | 1994 | Incumbent re-elected. | ▌ ✓ Steve LaTourette (Republican) 66%; ▌Elizabeth Kelley (Democratic) 34% |

== Oklahoma ==
| District | | Incumbent | | | | Candidates |
| Location | 1997 PVI | Member | Party | First elected | Status | Candidates |
|---|---|---|---|---|---|---|
| Oklahoma 1 | R+15 | Steve Largent | Republican | 1994 | Incumbent re-elected. | ▌ ✓ Steve Largent (Republican) 62%; ▌Howard Plowman (Democratic) 38% |
| Oklahoma 2 | Even | Tom Coburn | Republican | 1994 | Incumbent re-elected. | ▌ ✓ Tom Coburn (Republican) 58%; ▌Kent Pharaoh (Democratic) 40% |
| Oklahoma 3 | Even | Wes Watkins | Republican | 1976 (Note: Watkins was originally elected as a Democrat. After his original retirement in 1990, he became an independent, before returning to the House in 1997 as a Republican.); 1990 (retired); 1996 | Incumbent re-elected. | ▌ ✓ Wes Watkins (Republican) 62%; ▌Walt Roberts (Democratic) 38% |
| Oklahoma 4 | R+10 | J. C. Watts | Republican | 1994 | Incumbent re-elected. | ▌ ✓ J. C. Watts (Republican) 62%; ▌Ben Odom (Democratic) 38% |
| Oklahoma 5 | R+20 | Ernest Istook | Republican | 1992 | Incumbent re-elected. | ▌ ✓ Ernest Istook (Republican) 68%; ▌Ben Smothermon (Democratic) 32% |
| Oklahoma 6 | R+8 | Frank Lucas | Republican | 1994 | Incumbent re-elected. | ▌ ✓ Frank Lucas (Republican) 65%; ▌Paul Barby (Democratic) 34% |

== Oregon ==
| District | | Incumbent | | | | Candidates |
| Location | 1997 PVI | Member | Party | First elected | Status | Candidates |
|---|---|---|---|---|---|---|
| Oregon 1 | D+2 | Elizabeth Furse | Democratic | 1992 | Incumbent retired. Democratic hold. | ▌ ✓ David Wu (Democratic) 50%; ▌Molly Bordonaro (Republican) 47% |
| Oregon 2 | R+9 | Robert Freeman Smith | Republican | 1982; 1994 (retired); 1996 | Incumbent retired. Republican hold. | ▌ ✓ Greg Walden (Republican) 61%; ▌Kevin M. Campbell (Democratic) 35%; ▌Lindsay Bradshaw (Libertarian) 2%; ▌Rohn Webb (Socialist) 1% |
| Oregon 3 | D+13 | Earl Blumenauer | Democratic | 1996 | Incumbent re-elected. | ▌ ✓ Earl Blumenauer (Democratic) 84%; ▌Bruce Knight (Libertarian) 9%; ▌Walt Brown (Socialist) 6% |
| Oregon 4 | R+1 | Peter DeFazio | Democratic | 1986 | Incumbent re-elected. | ▌ ✓ Peter DeFazio (Democratic) 70%; ▌Steve J. Webb (Republican) 29% |
| Oregon 5 | R+1 | Darlene Hooley | Democratic | 1996 | Incumbent re-elected. | ▌ ✓ Darlene Hooley (Democratic) 55%; ▌Marylin Shannon (Republican) 40% |

== Pennsylvania ==
| District | | Incumbent | | | | Candidates |
| Location | 1997 PVI | Member | Party | First elected | Status | Candidates |
|---|---|---|---|---|---|---|
| Pennsylvania 1 | D+31 | Bob Brady | Democratic | 1998 (special) | Incumbent re-elected. | ▌ ✓ Bob Brady (Democratic) 81%; ▌William Harrison (Republican) 17% |
| Pennsylvania 2 | D+34 | Chaka Fattah | Democratic | 1994 | Incumbent re-elected. | ▌ ✓ Chaka Fattah (Democratic) 86%; ▌Anne Marie Mulligan (Republican) 14% |
| Pennsylvania 3 | D+13 | Robert Borski | Democratic | 1982 | Incumbent re-elected. | ▌ ✓ Robert Borski (Democratic) 60%; ▌Charles F. Dougherty (Republican) 40% |
| Pennsylvania 4 | Even | Ron Klink | Democratic | 1992 | Incumbent re-elected. | ▌ ✓ Ron Klink (Democratic) 64%; ▌Mike Turzai (Republican) 36% |
| Pennsylvania 5 | R+8 | John Peterson | Republican | 1996 | Incumbent re-elected. | ▌ ✓ John Peterson (Republican) 85%; ▌William M. Belitskus (Green) 15% |
| Pennsylvania 6 | R+7 | Tim Holden | Democratic | 1992 | Incumbent re-elected. | ▌ ✓ Tim Holden (Democratic) 61%; ▌John Meckley (Republican) 39% |
| Pennsylvania 7 | R+4 | Curt Weldon | Republican | 1986 | Incumbent re-elected. | ▌ ✓ Curt Weldon (Republican) 72%; ▌Martin D'Urso (Democratic) 28% |
| Pennsylvania 8 | R+3 | Jim Greenwood | Republican | 1992 | Incumbent re-elected. | ▌ ✓ Jim Greenwood (Republican) 64%; ▌Bill Tuthill (Democratic) 33% |
| Pennsylvania 9 | R+14 | Bud Shuster | Republican | 1972 | Incumbent re-elected. | ▌ ✓ Bud Shuster (Republican); Uncontested |
| Pennsylvania 10 | R+4 | Joseph M. McDade | Republican | 1962 | Incumbent retired. Republican hold. | ▌ ✓ Don Sherwood (Republican) 49%; ▌Patrick Casey (Democratic) 49% |
| Pennsylvania 11 | D+1 | Paul Kanjorski | Democratic | 1984 | Incumbent re-elected. | ▌ ✓ Paul Kanjorski (Democratic) 67%; ▌Stephen Urban (Republican) 33% |
| Pennsylvania 12 | Even | John Murtha | Democratic | 1974 | Incumbent re-elected. | ▌ ✓ John Murtha (Democratic) 68%; ▌Timothy Holloway (Republican) 32% |
| Pennsylvania 13 | Even | Jon D. Fox | Republican | 1994 | Incumbent lost re-election. Democratic gain. | ▌ ✓ Joe Hoeffel (Democratic) 52%; ▌Jon D. Fox (Republican) 47% |
| Pennsylvania 14 | D+11 | William J. Coyne | Democratic | 1980 | Incumbent re-elected. | ▌ ✓ William J. Coyne (Democratic) 61%; ▌Bill Ravotti (Republican) 39% |
| Pennsylvania 15 | R+1 | Paul McHale | Democratic | 1992 | Incumbent retired. Republican gain. | ▌ ✓ Pat Toomey (Republican) 55%; ▌Roy Afflerbach (Democratic) 45% |
| Pennsylvania 16 | R+13 | Joe Pitts | Republican | 1996 | Incumbent re-elected. | ▌ ✓ Joe Pitts (Republican) 71%; ▌Robert Yorczyk (Democratic) 29% |
| Pennsylvania 17 | R+14 | George Gekas | Republican | 1982 | Incumbent re-elected. | ▌ ✓ George Gekas (Republican); Uncontested |
| Pennsylvania 18 | D+4 | Mike Doyle | Democratic | 1994 | Incumbent re-elected. | ▌ ✓ Mike Doyle (Democratic) 68%; ▌Dick Walker (Republican) 32% |
| Pennsylvania 19 | R+12 | Bill Goodling | Republican | 1974 | Incumbent re-elected. | ▌ ✓ Bill Goodling (Republican) 68%; ▌Linda Ropp (Democratic) 29% |
| Pennsylvania 20 | D+4 | Frank Mascara | Democratic | 1994 | Incumbent re-elected. | ▌ ✓ Frank Mascara (Democratic); Uncontested |
| Pennsylvania 21 | D+1 | Phil English | Republican | 1994 | Incumbent re-elected. | ▌ ✓ Phil English (Republican) 63%; ▌Larry Klemens (Democratic) 37% |

== Rhode Island ==
| District | | Incumbent | | | | Candidates |
| Location | 1997 PVI | Member | Party | First elected | Status | Candidates |
|---|---|---|---|---|---|---|
| Rhode Island 1 | D+14 | Patrick J. Kennedy | Democratic | 1994 | Incumbent re-elected. | ▌ ✓ Patrick J. Kennedy (Democratic) 66.8%; ▌Joe Santa (Republican) 27.7%; ▌James C. Sheehan (Reform) 4.5%; ▌Charles Picerno (Independent) 1% |
| Rhode Island 2 | D+12 | Robert Weygand | Democratic | 1996 | Incumbent re-elected. | ▌ ✓ Robert Weygand (Democratic) 72%; ▌John Matson (Republican) 24.8%; ▌Timothy L. Miller (Reform) 3.2% |

== South Carolina ==
| District | | Incumbent | | | | Candidates |
| Location | 1997 PVI | Member | Party | First elected | Status | Candidates |
|---|---|---|---|---|---|---|
| South Carolina 1 | R+14 | Mark Sanford | Republican | 1994 | Incumbent re-elected. | ▌ ✓ Mark Sanford (Republican) 91%; ▌Joe Innella (Natural Law) 8.9% |
| South Carolina 2 | R+11 | Floyd Spence | Republican | 1970 | Incumbent re-elected. | ▌ ✓ Floyd Spence (Republican) 58%; ▌Jane Frederick (Democratic) 41%; ▌Maurice Raiford (Natural Law) 1% |
| South Carolina 3 | R+13 | Lindsey Graham | Republican | 1994 | Incumbent re-elected. | ▌ ✓ Lindsey Graham (Republican); Uncontested |
| South Carolina 4 | R+15 | Bob Inglis | Republican | 1992 | Incumbent retired to run for U.S. Senator. Republican hold. | ▌ ✓ Jim DeMint (Republican) 57.7%; ▌Glenn G. Reese (Democratic) 40.2%; ▌C. Faye Walters (Natural Law) 1.1%; ▌Peter J. Ashy (Patriot) 0.5% |
| South Carolina 5 | R+5 | John Spratt | Democratic | 1982 | Incumbent re-elected. | ▌ ✓ John Spratt (Democratic) 58%; ▌Mike Burkhold (Republican) 40.2%; ▌Dianne Nevins (Natural Law) 1.7% |
| South Carolina 6 | D+13 | Jim Clyburn | Democratic | 1992 | Incumbent re-elected. | ▌ ✓ Jim Clyburn (Democratic) 72.6%; ▌Gary McLeod (Republican) 25.8%; ▌George C. Taylor (Natural Law) 1.6% |

== South Dakota ==
| District | | Incumbent | | | | Candidates |
| Location | 1997 PVI | Member | Party | First elected | Status | Candidates |
|---|---|---|---|---|---|---|
| South Dakota at-large | R+6 | John Thune | Republican | 1996 | Incumbent re-elected. | ▌ ✓ John Thune (Republican) 75.1%; ▌Jeff Moser (Democratic) 24.9% |

== Tennessee ==
| District | | Incumbent | | | | Candidates |
| Location | 1997 PVI | Member | Party | First elected | Status | Candidates |
|---|---|---|---|---|---|---|
| Tennessee 1 | R+14 | Bill Jenkins | Republican | 1996 | Incumbent re-elected. | ▌ ✓ Bill Jenkins (Republican) 69%; ▌Kay White (Democratic) 31% |
| Tennessee 2 | R+9 | Jimmy Duncan | Republican | 1988 | Incumbent re-elected. | ▌ ✓ Jimmy Duncan (Republican) 88.6% |
| Tennessee 3 | R+5 | Zach Wamp | Republican | 1994 | Incumbent re-elected. | ▌ ✓ Zach Wamp (Republican) 67%; ▌Lewis Lewis (Democratic) 33% |
| Tennessee 4 | R+3 | Van Hilleary | Republican | 1994 | Incumbent re-elected. | ▌ ✓ Van Hilleary (Republican) 60%; ▌Jerry D. Cooper (Democratic) 40% |
| Tennessee 5 | D+4 | Bob Clement | Democratic | 1988 | Incumbent re-elected. | ▌ ✓ Bob Clement (Democratic) 83% |
| Tennessee 6 | R+4 | Bart Gordon | Democratic | 1984 | Incumbent re-elected. | ▌ ✓ Bart Gordon (Democratic) 55%; ▌Walt Massey (Republican) 45% |
| Tennessee 7 | R+11 | Ed Bryant | Republican | 1994 | Incumbent re-elected. | ▌ ✓ Ed Bryant (Republican); Uncontested |
| Tennessee 8 | R+1 | John Tanner | Democratic | 1988 | Incumbent re-elected. | ▌ ✓ John Tanner (Democratic); Uncontested |
| Tennessee 9 | D+17 | Harold Ford Jr. | Democratic | 1996 | Incumbent re-elected. | ▌ ✓ Harold Ford Jr. (Democratic) 79%; ▌Claude Burdikoff (Republican) 19% |

== Texas ==
| District | | Incumbent | | | | Candidates |
| Location | 1997 PVI | Member | Party | First elected | Status | Candidates |
|---|---|---|---|---|---|---|
| Texas 1 | R+5 | Max Sandlin | Democratic | 1996 | Incumbent re-elected. | ▌ ✓ Max Sandlin (Democratic) 59.4%; ▌Dennis Boerner (Republican) 40.6% |
| Texas 2 | R+3 | Jim Turner | Democratic | 1996 | Incumbent re-elected. | ▌ ✓ Jim Turner (Democratic) 58.4%; ▌Brian Babin (Republican) 40.8%; ▌Wendell Drye (Libertarian) 0.8% |
| Texas 3 | R+21 | Sam Johnson | Republican | 1991 | Incumbent re-elected. | ▌ ✓ Sam Johnson (Republican) 91.2%; ▌Ken Ashby (Libertarian) 8.8% |
| Texas 4 | R+15 | Ralph Hall | Democratic | 1980 | Incumbent re-elected. | ▌ ✓ Ralph Hall (Democratic) 57.6%; ▌Jim Lohmeyer (Republican) 40.9%; ▌Jim Simon (Libertarian) 1.5% |
| Texas 5 | R+7 | Pete Sessions | Republican | 1996 | Incumbent re-elected. | ▌ ✓ Pete Sessions (Republican) 55.8%; ▌Victor Morales (Democratic) 43.4%; ▌Michael Needleman (Libertarian) 0.8% |
| Texas 6 | R+19 | Joe Barton | Republican | 1984 | Incumbent re-elected. | ▌ ✓ Joe Barton (Republican) 72.9%; ▌Ben Boothe (Democratic) 25.9%; ▌Richard A. Bandlow (Libertarian) 1.2% |
| Texas 7 | R+25 | Bill Archer | Republican | 1970 | Incumbent re-elected. | ▌ ✓ Bill Archer (Republican) 93.3%; ▌Drew P. Parks (Libertarian) 6.6% |
| Texas 8 | R+26 | Kevin Brady | Republican | 1996 | Incumbent re-elected. | ▌ ✓ Kevin Brady (Republican) 92.8%; ▌Don Richards (Libertarian) 7.2% |
| Texas 9 | R+2 | Nick Lampson | Democratic | 1996 | Incumbent re-elected. | ▌ ✓ Nick Lampson (Democratic) 63.7%; ▌Tom Cottar (Republican) 36.3% |
| Texas 10 | D+4 | Lloyd Doggett | Democratic | 1994 | Incumbent re-elected. | ▌ ✓ Lloyd Doggett (Democratic) 85.2%; ▌Vincent J. May (Libertarian) 14.8% |
| Texas 11 | R+9 | Chet Edwards | Democratic | 1990 | Incumbent re-elected. | ▌ ✓ Chet Edwards (Democratic) 82.4%; ▌Vince Hanke (Libertarian) 17.6% |
| Texas 12 | R+4 | Kay Granger | Republican | 1996 | Incumbent re-elected. | ▌ ✓ Kay Granger (Republican) 61.9%; ▌Tom Hall (Democratic) 36.3%; ▌Paul Barthel (Libertarian) 1.8% |
| Texas 13 | R+11 | Mac Thornberry | Republican | 1994 | Incumbent re-elected. | ▌ ✓ Mac Thornberry (Republican) 67.9%; ▌Mark Harmon (Democratic) 31%; ▌Georganne Baker Payne (Libertarian) 1.1% |
| Texas 14 | R+8 | Ron Paul | Republican | 1996 | Incumbent re-elected. | ▌ ✓ Ron Paul (Republican) 55.3%; ▌Loy Sneary (Democratic) 44.5% |
| Texas 15 | D+8 | Rubén Hinojosa | Democratic | 1996 | Incumbent re-elected. | ▌ ✓ Rubén Hinojosa (Democratic) 58.4%; ▌Tom Haughey (Republican) 41.6% |
| Texas 16 | D+10 | Silvestre Reyes | Democratic | 1996 | Incumbent re-elected. | ▌ ✓ Silvestre Reyes (Democratic) 87.9%; ▌Stu Nance (Libertarian) 6.9%; ▌Lorenzo Morales (Independent) 5.1% |
| Texas 17 | R+10 | Charles Stenholm | Democratic | 1978 | Incumbent re-elected. | ▌ ✓ Charles Stenholm (Democratic) 53.6%; ▌Rudy Izzard (Republican) 45.3%; ▌Gordon Mobley (Libertarian) 1.1% |
| Texas 18 | D+21 | Sheila Jackson Lee | Democratic | 1994 | Incumbent re-elected. | ▌ ✓ Sheila Jackson Lee (Democratic) 89.9%; ▌James Partsch-Galvan (Libertarian) 10.1% |
| Texas 19 | R+26 | Larry Combest | Republican | 1984 | Incumbent re-elected. | ▌ ✓ Larry Combest (Republican) 83.6%; ▌Sidney Blankenship (Democratic) 16.4% |
| Texas 20 | D+8 | Henry B. González | Democratic | 1961 | Incumbent retired. Democratic hold. | ▌ ✓ Charlie González (Democratic) 63.2%; ▌James Walker (Republican) 35.6%; ▌Alex DePeña (Libertarian) 1.3% |
| Texas 21 | R+22 | Lamar Smith | Republican | 1986 | Incumbent re-elected. | ▌ ✓ Lamar Smith (Republican) 91.4%; ▌Jeffrey C. Blunt (Libertarian) 8.6% |
| Texas 22 | R+15 | Tom DeLay | Republican | 1984 | Incumbent re-elected. | ▌ ✓ Tom DeLay (Republican) 66%; ▌Hill Kemp (Democratic) 34% |
| Texas 23 | R+2 | Henry Bonilla | Republican | 1992 | Incumbent re-elected. | ▌ ✓ Henry Bonilla (Republican) 64%; ▌Charlie Jones (Democratic) 36% |
| Texas 24 | D+2 | Martin Frost | Democratic | 1978 | Incumbent re-elected. | ▌ ✓ Martin Frost (Democratic) 58%; ▌Shawn Terry (Republican) 34.2% |
| Texas 25 | R+1 | Ken Bentsen | Democratic | 1994 | Incumbent re-elected. | ▌ ✓ Ken Bentsen (Democratic) 58%; ▌John Sanchez (Republican) 42% |
| Texas 26 | R+22 | Dick Armey | Republican | 1984 | Incumbent re-elected. | ▌ ✓ Dick Armey (Republican) 88.1%; ▌Joe Turner (Libertarian) 11.9% |
| Texas 27 | D+5 | Solomon Ortiz | Democratic | 1982 | Incumbent re-elected. | ▌ ✓ Solomon Ortiz (Democratic) 64%; ▌Erol A. Stone (Republican) 36% |
| Texas 28 | D+11 | Ciro Rodriguez | Democratic | 1997 | Incumbent re-elected. | ▌ ✓ Ciro Rodriguez (Democratic) 90.5%; ▌Edward Elmer (Libertarian) 9.5% |
| Texas 29 | D+9 | Gene Green | Democratic | 1992 | Incumbent re-elected. | ▌ ✓ Gene Green (Democratic) 92.8%; ▌Lea Sherman (Independent) 4.2%; ▌James P. Chudleigh (Libertarian) 3% |
| Texas 30 | D+18 | Eddie Bernice Johnson | Democratic | 1992 | Incumbent re-elected. | ▌ ✓ Eddie Bernice Johnson (Democratic) 70%; ▌Carrie Kelleher (Republican) 30% |

== Utah ==
| District | | Incumbent | | | | Candidates |
| Location | 1997 PVI | Member | Party | First elected | Status | Candidates |
|---|---|---|---|---|---|---|
| Utah 1 | R+22 | Jim Hansen | Republican | 1980 | Incumbent re-elected. | ▌ ✓ Jim Hansen (Republican) 67.7%; ▌Steve Beierlein (Democratic) 30.4%; ▌Gerard Arthus (Libertarian) 1.9% |
| Utah 2 | R+9 | Merrill Cook | Republican | 1996 | Incumbent re-elected. | ▌ ✓ Merrill Cook (Republican) 52.7%; ▌Lily Eskelsen García (Democratic) 43.4%; ▌Ken Larsen (Independent) 2.3%; Others: ▌Brian E. Swim (Libertarian) 0.8%; ▌Arly H. Pedersen (U.S. Taxpayers) 0.5%; ▌Robert C. Lesh (Natural Law) 0.3% |
| Utah 3 | R+21 | Chris Cannon | Republican | 1996 | Incumbent re-elected. | ▌ ✓ Chris Cannon (Republican) 76.9%; ▌Will Christensen (U.S. Taxpayers) 15.8%; ▌Kitty Burton (Libertarian) 7.3% |

== Vermont ==
| District | | Incumbent | | | | Candidates |
| Location | 1997 PVI | Member | Party | First elected | Status | Candidates |
|---|---|---|---|---|---|---|
| Vermont at-large | D+8 | Bernie Sanders | Independent | 1990 | Incumbent re-elected. | ▌ ✓ Bernie Sanders (Independent) 63.4%; ▌Mark Candon (Republican) 32.9%; ▌Matthew Mulligan (Grassroots) 1.6%; ▌Peter Diamondstone (Liberty Union) 1%; ▌Robert Maynard (Libertarian) 1% |

== Virginia ==
| District | | Incumbent | | | | Candidates |
| Location | 1997 PVI | Member | Party | First elected | Status | Candidates |
|---|---|---|---|---|---|---|
| Virginia 1 | R+12 | Herb Bateman | Republican | 1982 | Incumbent re-elected. | ▌ ✓ Herb Bateman (Republican) 76.4%; ▌Bradford L. Phillips (Independent) 13.2%; ▌Josh Billings (Independent) 9.5% |
| Virginia 2 | R+8 | Owen B. Pickett | Democratic | 1986 | Incumbent re-elected. | ▌ ✓ Owen B. Pickett (Democratic); Uncontested |
| Virginia 3 | D+21 | Bobby Scott | Democratic | 1992 | Incumbent re-elected. | ▌ ✓ Bobby Scott (Democratic) 76%; ▌Robert S. Barnett (Independent) 22.8% |
| Virginia 4 | R+6 | Norman Sisisky | Democratic | 1982 | Incumbent re-elected. | ▌ ✓ Norman Sisisky (Democratic); Uncontested |
| Virginia 5 | R+7 | Virgil Goode | Democratic | 1996 | Incumbent re-elected. | ▌ ✓ Virgil Goode (Democratic); Uncontested |
| Virginia 6 | R+10 | Bob Goodlatte | Republican | 1992 | Incumbent re-elected. | ▌ ✓ Bob Goodlatte (Republican) 69.3%; ▌David A. Bowers (Democratic) 30.7% |
| Virginia 7 | R+17 | Thomas J. Bliley Jr. | Republican | 1980 | Incumbent re-elected. | ▌ ✓ Thomas J. Bliley Jr. (Republican) 78.7%; ▌Bradley E. Evans (Independent) 20.7% |
| Virginia 8 | D+3 | Jim Moran | Democratic | 1990 | Incumbent re-elected. | ▌ ✓ Jim Moran (Democratic) 66.7%; ▌Demaris H. Miller (Republican) 33.1% |
| Virginia 9 | R+3 | Rick Boucher | Democratic | 1982 | Incumbent re-elected. | ▌ ✓ Rick Boucher (Democratic) 60.9%; ▌J. A. Barta (Republican) 39.1% |
| Virginia 10 | R+13 | Frank Wolf | Republican | 1980 | Incumbent re-elected. | ▌ ✓ Frank Wolf (Republican) 71.6%; ▌Cornell W. Brooks (Democratic) 25.2%; ▌Robert A. Buchanan (Independent) 3.1% |
| Virginia 11 | R+4 | Tom Davis | Republican | 1994 | Incumbent re-elected. | ▌ ✓ Tom Davis (Republican) 81.7%; ▌C. W. Levy (Independent) 16.8% |

== Washington ==
| District | | Incumbent | | | | Candidates |
| Location | 1997 PVI | Member | Party | First elected | Status | Candidates |
|---|---|---|---|---|---|---|
| Washington 1 | D+3 | Rick White | Republican | 1994 | Incumbent lost re-election. Democratic gain. | ▌ ✓ Jay Inslee (Democratic) 49.8%; ▌Rick White (Republican) 44.1%; ▌Bruce Craswell (American Heritage) 6.1% |
| Washington 2 | Even | Jack Metcalf | Republican | 1994 | Incumbent re-elected. | ▌ ✓ Jack Metcalf (Republican) 55.2%; ▌Grethe Cammermeyer (Democratic) 44.8% |
| Washington 3 | D+2 | Linda Smith | Republican | 1994 | Incumbent retired to run for U.S. Senator. Democratic gain. | ▌ ✓ Brian Baird (Democratic) 54.7%; ▌Don Benton (Republican) 45.3% |
| Washington 4 | R+9 | Doc Hastings | Republican | 1994 | Incumbent re-elected. | ▌ ✓ Doc Hastings (Republican) 69.1%; ▌Gordon Pross (Democratic) 24.4%; ▌Peggy S. McKerlie (Reform) 6.5% |
| Washington 5 | R+3 | George Nethercutt | Republican | 1994 | Incumbent re-elected. | ▌ ✓ George Nethercutt (Republican) 56.9%; ▌Brad Lyons (Democratic) 38.1%; ▌John Beal (American Heritage) 5% |
| Washington 6 | D+4 | Norm Dicks | Democratic | 1976 | Incumbent re-elected. | ▌ ✓ Norm Dicks (Democratic) 68.4%; ▌Bob Lawrence (Republican) 31.6% |
| Washington 7 | D+23 | Jim McDermott | Democratic | 1988 | Incumbent re-elected. | ▌ ✓ Jim McDermott (Democratic) 88.2%; ▌Stan Lippmann (Reform) 9.4%; ▌Jeff Powers (Socialist Workers) 2.4% |
| Washington 8 | R+1 | Jennifer Dunn | Republican | 1992 | Incumbent re-elected. | ▌ ✓ Jennifer Dunn (Republican) 59.7%; ▌Heidi Behrens-Benedict (Democratic) 40.3% |
| Washington 9 | D+4 | Adam Smith | Democratic | 1996 | Incumbent re-elected. | ▌ ✓ Adam Smith (Democratic) 64.7%; ▌Ron Taber (Republican) 35.3% |

== West Virginia ==
| District | | Incumbent | | | | Candidates |
| Location | 1997 PVI | Member | Party | First elected | Status | Candidates |
|---|---|---|---|---|---|---|
| West Virginia 1 | D+2 | Alan Mollohan | Democratic | 1982 | Incumbent re-elected. | ▌ ✓ Alan Mollohan (Democratic) 84.7%; ▌Richard Kerr (Libertarian) 15.3% |
| West Virginia 2 | Even | Bob Wise | Democratic | 1982 | Incumbent re-elected. | ▌ ✓ Bob Wise (Democratic) 73%; ▌Sally Anne Kay (Republican) 21.4%; ▌John Brown (Libertarian) 5.6% |
| West Virginia 3 | D+10 | Nick Rahall | Democratic | 1976 | Incumbent re-elected. | ▌ ✓ Nick Rahall (Democratic) 86.6%; ▌Joe Whelan (Libertarian) 13.4% |

== Wisconsin ==
| District | | Incumbent | | | | Candidates |
| Location | 1997 PVI | Member | Party | First elected | Status | Candidates |
|---|---|---|---|---|---|---|
| Wisconsin 1 | D+2 | Mark Neumann | Republican | 1994 | Incumbent retired to run for U.S. Senator. Republican hold. | ▌ ✓ Paul Ryan (Republican) 57.1%; ▌Lydia Spottswood (Democratic) 42.7% |
| Wisconsin 2 | D+8 | Scott L. Klug | Republican | 1990 | Incumbent retired. Democratic gain. | ▌ ✓ Tammy Baldwin (Democratic) 52.5%; ▌Josephine Musser (Republican) 47.4% |
| Wisconsin 3 | D+4 | Ron Kind | Democratic | 1996 | Incumbent re-elected. | ▌ ✓ Ron Kind (Democratic) 71.5%; ▌Troy Brechler (Republican) 28.4% |
| Wisconsin 4 | Even | Jerry Kleczka | Democratic | 1984 | Incumbent re-elected. | ▌ ✓ Jerry Kleczka (Democratic) 57.9%; ▌Thomas G. Reynolds (Republican) 42% |
| Wisconsin 5 | D+13 | Tom Barrett | Democratic | 1992 | Incumbent re-elected. | ▌ ✓ Tom Barrett (Democratic) 78.2%; ▌Jack Melvin (Republican) 21.6% |
| Wisconsin 6 | R+4 | Tom Petri | Republican | 1979 (special) | Incumbent re-elected. | ▌ ✓ Tom Petri (Republican) 92.6%; ▌Timothy Farness (U.S. Taxpayers) 7.2% |
| Wisconsin 7 | D+3 | Dave Obey | Democratic | 1969 (special) | Incumbent re-elected. | ▌ ✓ Dave Obey (Democratic) 60.6%; ▌Scott West (Republican) 39.3% |
| Wisconsin 8 | R+3 | Jay Johnson | Democratic | 1996 | Incumbent lost re-election. Republican gain. | ▌ ✓ Mark Green (Republican) 54.6%; ▌Jay Johnson (Democratic) 45.4% |
| Wisconsin 9 | R+14 | Jim Sensenbrenner | Republican | 1978 | Incumbent re-elected. | ▌ ✓ Jim Sensenbrenner (Republican) 91.3%; ▌Jeffrey Gonyo (Independent) 8.5% |

== Wyoming ==
| District | | Incumbent | | | | Candidates |
| Location | 1997 PVI | Member | Party | First elected | Status | Candidates |
|---|---|---|---|---|---|---|
| Wyoming at-large | R+11 | Barbara Cubin | Republican | 1994 | Incumbent re-elected. | ▌ ✓ Barbara Cubin (Republican) 57.8%; ▌Scott Farris (Democratic) 38.7%; ▌Steve Richardson (Libertarian) 3.5% |

== See also ==
- 105th United States Congress
- 106th United States Congress
