= Phil Wyrick =

American politician

Phil Wyrick is a rancher and former state legislator in Arkansas. He served in the Arkansas House of Representatives and Arkansas Senate. He is a Republican. He campaigned to be a judge in Pulaski County.

He served in the Arkansas House from 1991 to 1995 and in the Arkansas Senate in 1997.

His wife Brenda has also served in political offices.

He lives in Mabelvale. He and his family operate Esquire Land & Cattle, which raises grass-fed cattle on three different farms. He is Catholic.
