= New York's 60th State Assembly district =

American legislative district

Assemblymember
Nikki Lucas; D–Starrett City

New York's 60th State Assembly district is one of the 150 districts in the New York State Assembly. It has been represented by Democrat Nikki Lucas since a special election in 2022.

== Geography ==
District 60 is in Brooklyn, and consists of the neighborhoods of East New York, Starrett City, the Hole and a portion of Brownsville. Shirley Chisholm State Park is also located within the district.

The district overlaps (partially) with New York's 7th and 8th congressional districts, is completely within the 19th district of the New York State Senate, and overlaps the 37th, 42nd, and 46th districts of the New York City Council.

=== 2000s ===
District 60 consisted of a portion of Bay Ridge in Brooklyn and the eastern shore of Staten Island. Following redistricting in 2011, this became the 64th district.

== Recent election results ==
=== 2026 ===
2026 New York State Assembly election, District 60
Party	Candidate	Votes	%
Democratic	Nikki Lucas (incumbent)		
Republican	Norman Ramsay		
Conservative	Norman Ramsay		
Total	Norman Ramsay		
Write-in			
Total votes			100.0

=== 2024 ===
2024 New York State Assembly election, District 60
Party	Candidate	Votes	%
Democratic	Nikki Lucas (incumbent)	29,257	99.6
Write-in		103	0.4
Total votes		29,360	100.0
Democratic hold			

=== 2022 ===
2022 New York State Assembly election, District 60
Primary election
Party	Candidate	Votes	%
Democratic	Nikki Lucas (incumbent)	4,967	72.5
Democratic	Keron Alleyne	1,873	27.3
Write-in		10	0.2
Total votes		6,850	100.0
General election
Democratic	Nikki Lucas (incumbent)	17,092	93.6
Working Families	Keron Alleyne	1,139	6.2
Write-in		30	0.2
Total votes		18,261	100.0
Democratic hold			

=== 2022 special ===
Incumbent Charles Barron resigned on January 1, 2022 to serve in the New York City Council, triggering a special election. In special elections for state legislative offices, primaries are usually not held – county committee members and district leaders for each party select nominees.

2022 New York State Assembly special election, District 60
Party	Candidate	Votes	%
Democratic	Nikki Lucas	2,386	79.8
Working Families	Keron Alleyne	538	18.0
Republican	Marvin King	47	
Conservative	Marvin King	17	
Total	Marvin King	64	2.1
Write-in		2	0.1
Total votes		2,990	100.0
Democratic hold			

=== 2020 ===
2020 New York State Assembly election, District 60
Party	Candidate	Votes	%
Democratic	Charles Barron (incumbent)	39,597	99.6
Write-in		143	0.4
Total votes		39,743	100.0
Democratic hold			

=== 2018 ===
2018 New York State Assembly election, District 60
Primary election
Party	Candidate	Votes	%
Democratic	Charles Barron (incumbent)	11,915	80.1
Democratic	Jaytee Spurgeon	2,940	19.8
Write-in		22	0.2
Total votes		14,877	100.0
General election
Democratic	Charles Barron (incumbent)	28,911	95.7
Republican	Leroy Bates	839	2.8
Conservative	Horrie Johnson	418	1.4
Write-in		41	0.1
Total votes		30,209	100.0
Democratic hold			

=== 2016 ===
2016 New York State Assembly election, District 60
Party	Candidate	Votes	%
Democratic	Charles Barron (incumbent)	37,051	96.4
Conservative	Ernest Johnson	1,343	3.5
Write-in		53	0.1
Total votes		38,431	100.0
Democratic hold			

=== 2014 ===
2014 New York State Assembly election, District 60
Primary election
Party	Candidate	Votes	%
Democratic	Charles Barron	4,082	63.1
Democratic	Chris Banks	2,370	36.7
Write-in		14	0.2
Total votes		6,466	100.0
General election
Democratic	Charles Barron	13,270	94.0
Republican	Leroy Bates	566	
Conservative	Leroy Bates	356	
Total	Leroy Bates	822	5.8
Write-in		26	0.2
Total votes		14,118	100.0
Democratic hold			

=== 2012 ===
2012 New York State Assembly election, District 60
Primary election
Party	Candidate	Votes	%
Democratic	Inez Barron (incumbent)	2,962	55.4
Democratic	Chris Banks	2,364	44.3
Write-in		15	0.3
Total votes		5,341	100.0
General election
Democratic	Inez Barron	33,950	
Working Families	Inez Barron	564	
Total	Inez Barron (incumbent)	34,514	96.6
Republican	Kenneth Waluyn	994	
Conservative	Kenneth Waluyn	186	
Total	Kenneth Waluyn	1,180	3.3
Write-in		18	0.1
Total votes		35,712	100.0
Democratic win (new boundaries)			

=== 2010 ===
2010 New York State Assembly election, District 60
Party	Candidate	Votes	%
Republican	Nicole Malliotakis	11,742	
Conservative	Nicole Malliotakis	2,039	
Taxpayers	Nicole Malliotakis	163	
Total	Nicole Malliotakis	13,944	54.5
Democratic	Janele Hyer-Spencer	9,788	
Independence	Janele Hyer-Spencer	853	
Working Families	Janele Hyer-Spencer	794	
Total	Janele Hyer-Spencer (incumbent)	11,435	44.7
Right to Life	Marietta Canning	197	0.8
Write-in		15	0.0
Total votes		25,591	100.0
Republican gain from Democratic			

=== 2008 ===
2008 New York State Assembly election, District 60
Party	Candidate	Votes	%
Democratic	Janele Hyer-Spencer	17,847	
Independence	Janele Hyer-Spencer	1,196	
Working Families	Janele Hyer-Spencer	1,034	
Total	Janele Hyer-Spencer (incumbent)	20,078	54.7
Republican	Joseph Cammarata	15,002	
Conservative	Joseph Cammarata	1,618	
Total	Joseph Cammarata	16,620	45.3
Write-in		6	0.0
Total votes		36,703	100.0
Democratic hold			

=== 2006 ===
2006 New York State Assembly election, District 60
Primary election
Party	Candidate	Votes	%
Republican	Anthony Xanthakis	1,409	61.3
Republican	Joseph Cammarata	888	38.7
Write-in		0	0.2
Total votes		2,297	100.0
Independence	Janele Hyer-Spencer	75	93.8
Write-in		5	6.2
Total votes		80	100.0
General election
Democratic	Janele Hyer-Spencer	10,166	
Working Families	Janele Hyer-Spencer	698	
Independence	Janele Hyer-Spencer	488	
Total	Janele Hyer-Spencer	11,352	51.7
Republican	Anthony Xanthakis	9,172	
Conservative	Anthony Xanthakis	1,433	
Total	Anthony Xanthakis	10,605	48.3
Write-in		1	0.0
Total votes		21,958	100.0
Democratic gain from Republican			

=== 2004 ===
2004 New York State Assembly election, District 60
Party	Candidate	Votes	%
Republican	Matthew Mirones	18,081	
Conservative	Matthew Mirones	1,798	
Independence	Matthew Mirones	682	
Total	Matthew Mirones (incumbent)	20,561	59.9
Democratic	Janele Hyer-Spencer	13,006	
Working Families	Janele Hyer-Spencer	736	
Total	Janele Hyer-Spencer	13,742	40.1
Write-in		2	0.0
Total votes		34,305	100.0
Republican hold			

=== 2002 general ===
2002 New York State Assembly election, District 60
Party	Candidate	Votes	%
Republican	Matthew Mirones	10,864	
Conservative	Matthew Mirones	1,437	
Right to Life	Matthew Mirones	485	
Independence	Matthew Mirones	399	
Total	Matthew Mirones (incumbent)	13,185	65.0
Democratic	Matthew Spano	6,717	
Working Families	Matthew Spano	367	
Total	Matthew Spano	7,084	35.0
Write-in		1	0.0
Total votes		20,270	100.0
Republican win (new boundaries)			

=== 2002 special ===
2002 New York State Assembly election, District 60
Party	Candidate	Votes	%
Republican	Matthew Mirones	3,215	
Conservative	Matthew Mirones	426	
Right to Life	Matthew Mirones	286	
Independence	Matthew Mirones	268	
Total	Matthew Mirones	4,195	55.2
Democratic	James Hart	3,141	
Working Families	James Hart	268	
Total	James Hart	3,409	44.8
Write-in		1	0.0
Total votes		7,605	100.0
Republican gain from Democratic			

=== 2000 ===
2000 New York State Assembly election, District 60
Party	Candidate	Votes	%
Democratic	Eric Vitaliano	24,599	
Conservative	Eric Vitaliano	2,419	
Working Families	Eric Vitaliano	816	
Total	Eric Vitaliano (incumbent)	27,834	70.4
Republican	Frank Peters	11,183	28.3
Green	Thomas Hamilton	270	
Independence	Thomas Hamilton	228	
Total	Thomas Hamilton	498	1.3
Write-in		1	0.0
Total votes		39,516	100.0
Democratic hold			

=== Federal results in Assembly District 60 ===
Year	Office	Results
2024	President	Harris 87.2 - 12.1%
2024	Senate	Gillibrand 89.2 - 10.2%
2022	Senate	Schumer 92.3 - 7.4%
2020	President	Biden 92.4 - 7.1%
2018	Senate	Gillibrand 97.3 - 2.7%
2016	President	Clinton 95.0 - 3.7%
2016	Senate	Schumer 95.9 - 2.9%
2012	President	Obama 97.2 - 2.7%
2012	Senate	Gillibrand 97.5 - 2.2%
