= 2024 United States presidential election in New York =

- November 5, 2024
- Turnout: 62.2% (▼7.5 pp)

Nominee	Kamala Harris	Donald Trump
Party	Democratic	Republican
Alliance	Working Families	Conservative
Home state	California	Florida
Running mate	Tim Walz	JD Vance
Electoral vote	28	0
Popular vote	4,619,195	3,578,899
Percentage	55.91%	43.31%

Harris
40–50%
50–60%
60–70%
70–80%
80–90%
90–100%
Trump
40–50%
50–60%
60–70%
70–80%
80–90%
90–100%
Tie/No Data
President before election
Joe Biden
Democratic
Elected President
Donald Trump
Republican

The 2024 United States presidential election in New York was held on Tuesday, November 5, 2024, as part of the 2024 United States presidential election in which all 50 states plus the District of Columbia participated. New York voters chose electors to represent them in the Electoral College via a popular vote. The state of New York had 28 electoral votes in the Electoral College, following reapportionment due to the 2020 United States census in which the state lost a seat.

Prior to the election, New York was considered to be a state Harris would win or a safe blue state. Although it remained comfortably Democratic, New York was the state that had the biggest Republican swing out of any state in the nation in the 2024 election, with Trump greatly improving his performance by winning 43.31% of the state's vote, compared to 36.75% in the 2016 election and 37.74% in 2020. New York followed a trend of blue states, such as Massachusetts, New Jersey, Illinois and California voting more Republican than in 2020.

Harris had the smallest Democratic margin in New York City of any Democratic nominee since 1988, with Trump becoming the first Republican to win at least 30% of the vote in New York City since 1988. Turnout in New York State was also down by approximately 7.5% compared to 2020, which likely contributed to reduced Democratic margins in many parts of the state. The Bronx and Queens swung toward Trump by more than 20 percentage points from 2020; these were among the largest county swings toward Trump outside of South Texas and Imperial County, California. Nonetheless, Harris still won the state by a decisive margin of 12.6 percentage points.

Polling had indicated a potentially closer race in New York in 2024 than in 2016 or 2020, but Democrats still consistently led by margins well outside the margin of error. Nonetheless, Trump's performance in New York was the strongest of any Republican presidential candidate since George H. W. Bush lost by just 4.1 points in the 1988 election, having decreased the Democratic margin of victory by 10.57 percentage points compared to 2020.

== Primary elections ==
=== Democratic primary ===
The 2024 New York Democratic presidential primary was held on April 2, alongside primaries in Connecticut, Rhode Island, and Wisconsin.

New York Democratic primary, April 2, 2024
Candidate	Votes	%	Delegates
Joe Biden (incumbent)	288,090	80.71	268
Marianne Williamson	15,567	4.36	0
Dean Phillips (withdrawn)	11,302	3.17	0
Blank ballots	41,092	11.51	—
Void ballots	904	0.25	—
Total	356,955	100%	268

==== Primary polling ====
Poll source	Date(s) administered	Sample size (Note: Key: A – all adults RV – registered voters LV – likely voters V – unclear)	Margin of error	Joe Biden	Different Candidate	Undecided
Siena College	Sep 10–13, 2023	804 (RV)	± 4.3%	54%	40%	6%
Siena College	Aug 13–16, 2023	803 (RV)	± 4.4%	47%	46%	7%
Siena College	Jun 20–25, 2023	817 (RV)	± 3.9%	54%	40%	6%
Siena College	May 7–11, 2023	810 (RV)	± 4.1%	56%	40%	4%
Siena College	Mar 19–22, 2023	802 (RV)	± 4.6%	43%	51%	7%

=== Republican primary ===
The New York Republican primary was held on April 2, 2024, alongside the Connecticut primary.

New York Republican primary, April 2, 2024
Candidate	Votes	Percentage	Actual delegate count		
Candidate	Votes	Percentage	Bound	Unbound	Total
Donald Trump	132,698	81.2%	91		91
Nikki Haley (withdrawn)	21,145	12.9%			
Chris Christie (withdrawn)	6,679	4.1%			
Vivek Ramaswamy (withdrawn)	1,667	1.0%			
Blank or void ballots	1,311	0.8%			
Total:	163,500	100.0%	91		91

== General election ==
Only two candidates appeared on the ballot in New York: Kamala Harris (under the Democratic and Working Families Party tickets) and Donald Trump (under the Republican and New York Conservative Party tickets). Robert F. Kennedy Jr. did not appear on the ballot in New York after Judge Christina Ryba of the 3rd New York Judicial District ruled that he falsely listed his place of residence as Katonah, New York but actually lived in Los Angeles.

The state authorized votes for 12 write-in candidates:

- Shiva Ayyadurai
- Claudia De la Cruz, nominee of the Party for Socialism and Liberation
- Chris Garrity
- Garry Hubbard
- Andre Ramon McNeil Sr
- Andrew O'Donnell, nominee of the King Kong Party
- Chase Oliver, nominee of the Libertarian Party
- Future Madam Potus
- Raymond Anthony Scollin, former Franklin County Republican Committee chairman
- Peter Sonski, nominee of the American Solidarity Party
- Jill Stein, nominee of the Green Party
- Cornel West

These electors were nominated by each party in order to vote in the Electoral College should their candidate win the state:

Kamala Harris and Tim Walz Democratic Party Working Families Party	Donald Trump and JD Vance Republican Party Conservative Party
Kathy Hochul; Jay Jacobs; Eric Adams; Mohammed Akber Alam; Stuart Appelbaum; Byron Brown; Mario Cliento; Michelle Crentsil; Antonio Delgado; Thomas DiNapoli; Hazel Dukes; Thomas J. Garry; Vanessa Gibson; George Gresham; Carl Heastie; Letitia James; Gary LaBarbera; Carolyn Maloney; Luis Miranda; Crystal Peoples-Stokes; Christine Quinn; Katherine Sheehan; Anastasia Somoza; Andrea Stewart-Cousins; Gerard J. Sweeney; Sandra Ung; Latrice Walker; Randi Weingarten	Edward F. Cox; William Barclay; Bruce Blakeman; Joe Borelli; Karl Brabenec; John Burnett; Joe Cairo; Andrea Catsimatidis; Benjamin Federman; Jesse Garcia; Mark Heberling; Michael Kracker; Michael McCormack; Steven McLaughlin; Tim McNulty; Anthony Nunziato; Rob Ortt; Patrick Reilly; Michael Rendino; Jennifer Rich; Sylvia Rowan; Christopher Tague; Trish Turner; Joseph Whalen; Lee Zeldin; Ralph Lorigo; Donald Mazzullo; Michael Torres

=== Predictions ===
Source	Ranking	As of
Cook Political Report	Solid D	December 19, 2023
Inside Elections	Solid D	April 26, 2023
Sabato's Crystal Ball	Safe D	June 29, 2023
Decision Desk HQ/The Hill	Safe D	December 14, 2023
CNalysis	Solid D	December 30, 2023
CNN	Solid D	January 14, 2024
The Economist	Safe D	June 12, 2024
538	Solid D	August 23, 2024
RCP	Solid D	June 26, 2024
NBC News	Safe D	October 6, 2024

=== Polling ===
Kamala Harris vs. Donald Trump

Poll source	Date(s) administered	Sample size	Margin of error	Kamala Harris Democratic	Donald Trump Republican	Other / Undecided
Research Co.	November 2–3, 2024	450 (LV)	± 4.6%	57%	41%	2%
ActiVote	October 7–27, 2024	400 (LV)	± 4.9%	59%	41%	–
Siena College	October 13–17, 2024	872 (LV)	± 4.1%	58%	39%	3%
ActiVote	September 4–30, 2024	400 (LV)	± 4.9%	61%	39%	–
Emerson College (Note: Poll sponsored by WPIX-TV)	September 23–25, 2024	1,000 (RV)	± 3.0%	54%	40%	6% (Note: "Someone else" with 3%)
Siena College	September 11–16, 2024	1,003 (LV)	± 4.3%	55%	42%	3%
	August 23, 2024	Robert F. Kennedy Jr. suspends his presidential campaign and endorses Donald Trump.				
	August 22, 2024	Democratic National Convention concludes				
ActiVote	August 1–21, 2024	400 (LV)	± 4.9%	58%	42%	–
	August 19, 2024	Democratic National Convention begins				
	August 6, 2024	Kamala Harris selects Gov. Tim Walz as her running mate.				
Siena College	July 28 – August 1, 2024	1,199 (LV)	± 4.0%	53%	39%	8%
	July 21, 2024	Joe Biden announces his official withdrawal from the race; Kamala Harris declares her candidacy for president.				
SoCal Strategies (R) (Note: Poll sponsored by On Point Politics)	July 18–19, 2024	500 (LV)	± 4.4%	52%	41%	7%

Kamala Harris vs. Donald Trump vs. Cornel West vs. Jill Stein vs. Chase Oliver

Poll source	Date(s) administered	Sample size	Margin of error	Kamala Harris Democratic	Donald Trump Republican	Cornel West Independent	Jill Stein Green	Chase Oliver Libertarian	Other / Undecided
Siena College	September 11–16, 2024	1,003 (LV)	± 4.3%	52%	40%	1%	2%	0%	5%

Hypothetical polling with Robert F. Kennedy Jr.

Kamala Harris vs. Donald Trump vs. Robert F. Kennedy Jr. vs. Cornel West vs. Jill Stein vs. Chase Oliver

Poll source	Date(s) administered	Sample size	Margin of error	Kamala Harris Democratic	Donald Trump Republican	Robert F. Kennedy Jr. Independent	Cornel West Independent	Jill Stein Green	Chase Oliver Libertarian	Other / Undecided
Siena College	October 13–17, 2024	872 (LV)	± 4.1%	54%	37%	0%	1%	1%	1%	6% (Note: "Someone else" with 1%)
Siena College	July 28 – August 1, 2024	1,199 (LV)	± 4.0%	49%	37%	7%	1%	2%	1%	10%

Hypothetical polling with Joe Biden and Donald Trump

Joe Biden vs. Donald Trump

Poll source	Date(s) administered	Sample size	Margin of error	Joe Biden Democratic	Donald Trump Republican	Other / Undecided
SoCal Strategies (R)	July 18–19, 2024	500 (LV)	± 4.4%	52%	41%	7%
Siena College	June 12–13 & 16–17, 2024	805 (RV)	± 4.1%	47%	39%	14%
Emerson College (Note: Poll sponsored by Nexstar Media Group)	May 28–29, 2024	1,000 (RV)	± 3.0%	48%	41%	11%
Emerson College	May 28–29, 2024	1,000 (RV)	± 3.0%	55% (Note: With voters who lean towards a given candidate)	45%	–
Siena College	May 13–15, 2024	1,191 (RV)	± 3.9%	47%	38%	15%
Slingshot Strategies (D)	May 2–3, 2024	1,059 (RV)	± 5.0%	56%	37%	17%
John Zogby Strategies (Note: Poll conducted for Kennedy's campaign)	April 13–21, 2024	749 (LV)	–	48%	42%	10%
Siena College	April 15–17, 2024	806 (RV)	± 4.1%	47%	37%	16%
Siena College	February 12–14, 2024	806 (RV)	± 4.2%	48%	36%	16%
Siena College	January 14–17, 2024	807 (RV)	± 4.5%	46%	37%	17%
Siena College	November 12–15, 2023	803 (RV)	± 4.6%	46%	36%	18%
Siena College	October 15–19, 2023	1,225 (RV)	± 3.4%	46%	37%	17%
Siena College	September 10–13, 2023	804 (RV)	± 4.3%	52%	31%	17%
Siena College	August 13–16, 2023	803 (RV)	± 4.4%	47%	34%	19%
Siena College	June 20–25, 2023	817 (RV)	± 3.9%	50%	28%	21%
SurveyUSA (Note: Poll sponsored by WNYT-TV)	November 3–6, 2022	918 (RV)	± 4.1%	46%	34%	20%
Emerson College	October 20–24, 2022	1,000 (LV)	± 3.0%	47%	40%	13%
SurveyUSA (Note: Poll sponsored by WHEC-TV & WNYT-TV)	October 14–18, 2022	1,018 (RV)	± 4.4%	42%	37%	21%
Emerson College	September 4–6, 2022	1,000 (LV)	± 3.0%	53%	37%	10%
SurveyUSA	August 17–21, 2022	715 (LV)	± 4.6%	49%	29%	22%
McLaughlin & Associates (R)	August 7–9, 2022	600 (LV)	± 4.0%	52%	40%	8%

Joe Biden vs. Donald Trump vs. Robert F. Kennedy Jr. vs. Cornel West

Poll source	Date(s) administered	Sample size	Margin of error	Joe Biden Democratic	Donald Trump Republican	Robert F. Kennedy Jr. Independent	Cornel West Independent	Other / Undecided
Siena College	February 12–14, 2024	806 (RV)	± 4.2%	42%	32%	13%	6%	7%
Siena College	January 14–17, 2024	807 (RV)	± 4.5%	41%	32%	13%	3%	11%
Siena College	November 12–15, 2023	803 (RV)	± 4.6%	37%	28%	18%	5%	11%
Siena College	October 15–19, 2023	1,225 (RV)	± 3.4%	38%	31%	13%	5%	12%

Joe Biden vs. Donald Trump vs. Robert F. Kennedy Jr. vs. Cornel West vs. Jill Stein

Poll source	Date(s) administered	Sample size	Margin of error	Joe Biden Democratic	Donald Trump Republican	Robert F. Kennedy Jr. Independent	Cornel West Independent	Jill Stein Green	Other / Undecided
Emerson College	May 28–29, 2024	1,000 (RV)	± 3.0%	44%	38%	6%	2%	1%	9%

Hypothetical polling with other candidates

Joe Biden vs. Robert F. Kennedy Jr.

Poll source	Date(s) administered	Sample size	Margin of error	Joe Biden Democratic	Robert F. Kennedy Jr. Independent	Other / Undecided
John Zogby Strategies	April 13–21, 2024	749 (LV)	–	44%	44%	12%

Robert F. Kennedy Jr. vs. Donald Trump

Poll source	Date(s) administered	Sample size	Margin of error	Robert F. Kennedy Jr. Independent	Donald Trump Republican	Other / Undecided
John Zogby Strategies	April 13–21, 2024	749 (LV)	–	45%	39%	16%

=== Results ===
State House district results: Trump 50–60% 60–70% 70–80% / Harris 40–50% 50–60% 60–70% 70–80% 80–90% 90–100%

2024 United States presidential election in New York
Party	Candidate	Votes	%	±%
Democratic	Kamala Harris; Tim Walz	4,341,375	52.54%	▼3.84%
Working Families	Kamala Harris; Tim Walz	277,820	3.36%	▼1.12%
Total	Kamala Harris; Tim Walz	4,619,195	55.91%	▼4.96%
Republican	Donald Trump; JD Vance	3,257,166	39.42%	▲5.12%
Conservative	Donald Trump; JD Vance	321,733	3.89%	▲0.45%
Total	Donald Trump; JD Vance	3,578,899	43.31%	▲5.57%
Write-in		64,401	0.78%	▲0.74%
Total votes		8,262,495	100.00%	N/A

Complete list of votes for all registered write-in candidates
Party	Candidate	Votes	%	±%
Green	Jill Stein	46,698	0.57%	▲0.19%
Socialism and Liberation	Claudia De la Cruz	6,327	0.08%	N/A
Libertarian	Chase Oliver	5,338	0.06%	▼0.74%
Independent	Cornel West	4,152	0.05%	N/A
American Solidarity	Peter Sonski	1,544	0.02%	N/A
Independent	Shiva Ayyadurai	134	>0.00%	N/A
Independent	Chris Garrity	108	>0.00%	N/A
Independent	Raymond Anthony Scollin	51	>0.00%	N/A
Independent	Andrew O'Donnell	20	>0.00%	N/A
Independent	Future Madam Potus	18	>0.00%	N/A
Independent	Garry Hubbard	6	>0.00%	N/A
Independent	Andre Ramon McNeil Sr	5	>0.00%	N/A

==== New York City results ====
2024 presidential election in New York City		Manhattan	The Bronx	Brooklyn	Queens	Staten Island	Total	
Democratic- Working Families	Kamala Harris	533,782	261,670	601,265	437,282	69,345	1,903,344	68.10%
Democratic- Working Families	Kamala Harris	80.80%	71.88%	70.43%	61.08%	34.58%	1,903,344	68.10%
Republican- Conservative	Donald Trump	113,921	98,174	233,964	264,628	128,151	838,838	30.01%
Republican- Conservative	Donald Trump	17.24%	26.97%	27.40%	36.96%	63.90%	838,838	30.01%
Write-in	Write-in	12,930	4,217	18,215	14,054	3,062	52,778	1.89%
Write-in	Write-in	1.96%	1.15%	2.17%	1.96%	1.52%	52,778	1.89%
Total		660,633	364,061	853,744	715,964	200,558	2,794,960	100.00%

==== By New York City Council district ====
2024 presidential election New York City Council map

Harris won 43 of 51 New York City Council districts, including one held by a Republican, while Trump won eight districts, including three held by Democrats.

District	Harris	Trump	City council member
1st	75.5%	22.3%	Christopher Marte
2nd	82.7%	15.2%	Carlina Rivera
3rd	82.9%	15.1%	Erik Bottcher
4th	76.0%	21.9%	Keith Powers
5th	78.2%	19.7%	Julie Menin
6th	84.3%	13.8%	Gale Brewer
7th	84.8%	13.3%	Shaun Abreu
8th	78.7%	19.7%	Diana Ayala
9th	88.4%	9.8%	Yusef Salaam
10th	74.1%	24.3%	Carmen De La Rosa
11th	72.1%	26.1%	Eric Dinowitz
12th	86.3%	13.1%	Kevin Riley
13th	55.4%	43.1%	Kristy Marmorato
14th	66.8%	32.4%	Pierina Sanchez
15th	70.3%	28.8%	Oswald Feliz
16th	73.3%	25.9%	Althea Stevens
17th	74.1%	25.2%	Rafael Salamanca
18th	73.8%	24.4%	Amanda Farías
19th	45.6%	53.2%	Vickie Paladino
20th	49.6%	48.7%	Sandra Ung
21st	57.1%	41.7%	Francisco Moya
22nd	68.2%	29.2%	Tiffany Cabán
23rd	57.0%	40.4%	Linda Lee
24th	50.8%	46.8%	James Gennaro
25th	59.1%	38.6%	Shekar Krishnan
26th	69.9%	27.3%	Julie Won
27th	84.6%	14.0%	Nantasha Williams
28th	76.2%	22.5%	Adrienne Adams
29th	60.4%	37.8%	Lynn Schulman
30th	47.2%	50.9%	Robert Holden
31st	81.1%	18.3%	Selvena Brooks-Powers
32nd	42.5%	55.8%	Joann Ariola
33rd	78.2%	19.5%	Lincoln Restler
34th	77.0%	22.0%	Jennifer Gutiérrez
35th	86.9%	10.6%	Crystal Hudson
36th	89.3%	7.4%	Chi Ossé
37th	75.8%	21.2%	Sandy Nurse
38th	59.7%	37.7%	Alexa Avilés
39th	83.1%	14.0%	Shahana Hanif
40th	85.1%	12.3%	Rita Joseph
41st	90.0%	8.7%	Darlene Mealy
42nd	87.6%	11.6%	Chris Banks
43rd	37.6%	60.5%	Susan Zhuang
44th	15.9%	82.8%	Kalman Yeger
45th	76.5%	21.8%	Farah Louis
46th	66.0%	33.1%	Mercedes Narcisse
47th	50.2%	46.9%	Justin Brannan
48th	26.4%	72.0%	Inna Vernikov
49th	58.9%	39.2%	Kamillah Hanks
50th	30.2%	68.0%	David Carr
51st	22.3%	76.6%	Joe Borelli

==== By county ====
County	Kamala Harris Democratic		Donald Trump Republican		Various candidates Other parties		Margin		Total
County	#	%	#	%	#	%	#	%	Total
Albany	92,589	61.86%	54,560	36.45%	2,528	1.69%	38,029	25.41%	149,677
Allegany	5,483	28.08%	13,826	70.80%	220	1.12%	-8,343	-42.72%	19,529
Bronx	261,670	71.88%	98,174	26.97%	4,217	1.15%	163,496	44.91%	364,061
Broome	45,142	49.59%	44,763	49.17%	1,129	1.24%	379	0.42%	91,034
Cattaraugus	11,424	33.49%	22,586	66.22%	97	0.29%	-11,162	-32.73%	34,107
Cayuga	15,772	43.19%	20,482	56.09%	263	0.72%	-4,710	-12.90%	36,517
Chautauqua	22,085	38.71%	34,528	60.53%	433	0.76%	-12,443	-21.82%	57,046
Chemung	15,572	41.46%	21,861	58.20%	127	0.34%	-6,289	-16.74%	37,560
Chenango	8,177	36.09%	14,294	63.09%	184	0.82%	-6,117	-27.00%	22,655
Clinton	17,478	48.80%	18,247	50.95%	92	0.25%	-769	-2.15%	35,817
Columbia	20,396	56.82%	15,168	42.25%	333	0.93%	5,228	14.57%	35,897
Cortland	10,290	46.64%	11,706	53.06%	67	0.30%	-1,416	-6.42%	22,063
Delaware	9,237	39.71%	13,789	59.28%	234	1.01%	-4,552	-19.57%	23,260
Dutchess	79,994	52.14%	71,778	46.79%	1,641	1.07%	8,216	5.35%	153,413
Erie	248,651	54.08%	204,774	44.54%	6,364	1.38%	43,877	9.54%	459,789
Essex	9,629	50.06%	9,533	49.56%	74	0.38%	96	0.50%	19,236
Franklin	8,821	45.33%	10,569	54.32%	68	0.35%	-1,748	-8.99%	19,458
Fulton	7,666	31.87%	16,237	67.51%	150	0.62%	-8,571	-35.64%	24,053
Genesee	9,367	32.93%	18,997	66.79%	80	0.28%	-9,630	-33.86%	28,444
Greene	10,436	41.02%	14,702	57.79%	302	1.19%	-4,266	-16.77%	25,440
Hamilton	1,211	35.21%	2,223	64.64%	5	0.15%	-1,012	-29.43%	3,439
Herkimer	9,110	31.57%	19,557	67.77%	190	0.66%	-10,447	-36.20%	28,857
Jefferson	16,326	38.11%	26,417	61.66%	100	0.23%	-10,091	-23.55%	42,843
Kings	601,265	70.43%	233,964	27.40%	18,515	2.17%	367,301	43.03%	853,744
Lewis	3,600	27.62%	9,353	71.77%	79	0.61%	-5,753	-44.15%	13,032
Livingston	12,148	39.14%	18,780	60.51%	107	0.35%	-6,632	-21.37%	31,035
Madison	14,629	43.00%	19,025	55.92%	365	1.08%	-4,396	-12.92%	34,019
Monroe	214,757	58.90%	145,940	40.03%	3,893	1.07%	68,817	18.87%	364,590
Montgomery	7,356	35.40%	13,286	63.93%	140	0.67%	-5,930	-28.53%	20,782
Nassau	338,424	47.29%	368,117	51.44%	9,124	1.27%	-29,693	-4.15%	715,665
New York	533,782	80.80%	113,921	17.24%	12,930	1.96%	419,861	63.56%	660,633
Niagara	43,438	42.21%	58,678	57.01%	802	0.78%	-15,240	-14.80%	102,918
Oneida	39,415	39.10%	60,687	60.20%	712	0.70%	-21,272	-21.10%	100,814
Onondaga	133,155	57.91%	93,916	40.84%	2,871	1.25%	39,239	17.07%	229,942
Ontario	29,520	48.91%	30,221	50.07%	611	1.02%	-701	-1.16%	60,352
Orange	80,253	45.69%	94,936	54.05%	471	0.26%	-14,683	-8.36%	175,660
Orleans	5,366	29.69%	12,659	70.05%	46	0.26%	-7,293	-40.36%	18,071
Oswego	20,483	37.82%	33,548	61.94%	132	0.24%	-13,065	-24.12%	54,163
Otsego	13,031	45.58%	15,256	53.36%	305	1.06%	-2,225	-7.78%	28,592
Putnam	23,956	42.77%	31,553	56.33%	505	0.90%	-7,597	-13.56%	56,014
Queens	437,282	61.08%	264,628	36.96%	14,054	1.96%	172,654	24.12%	715,964
Rensselaer	39,668	50.12%	38,601	48.78%	882	1.11%	1,067	1.35%	79,151
Richmond	69,345	34.58%	128,151	63.90%	3,062	1.52%	-58,806	-29.32%	200,558
Rockland	65,880	43.68%	83,543	55.39%	1,402	0.93%	-17,663	-11.71%	150,825
St. Lawrence	18,010	40.78%	25,919	58.68%	239	0.54%	-7,909	-17.90%	44,168
Saratoga	66,321	50.70%	63,940	48.88%	551	0.42%	2,381	1.82%	130,812
Schenectady	39,733	54.75%	31,975	44.06%	864	1.19%	7,758	10.69%	72,572
Schoharie	5,547	34.43%	10,423	64.69%	142	0.88%	-4,876	-30.26%	16,112
Schuyler	3,736	39.19%	5,717	59.98%	79	0.83%	-1,981	-20.79%	9,532
Seneca	6,610	43.76%	8,379	55.47%	116	0.77%	-1,769	-11.71%	15,105
Steuben	15,413	33.82%	29,777	65.34%	385	0.84%	-14,364	-31.52%	45,575
Suffolk	341,812	44.81%	417,549	54.74%	3,488	0.45%	-75,737	-9.93%	762,849
Sullivan	14,549	41.50%	20,386	58.14%	127	0.36%	-5,837	-16.64%	35,062
Tioga	9,437	38.43%	15,038	61.23%	84	0.34%	-5,601	-22.80%	24,559
Tompkins	34,631	73.84%	11,354	24.21%	917	1.95%	23,277	49.63%	46,902
Ulster	57,974	58.46%	39,743	40.07%	1,455	1.47%	18,231	18.39%	99,172
Warren	17,099	47.40%	18,606	51.58%	370	1.02%	-1,507	-4.18%	36,075
Washington	11,224	39.09%	17,268	60.13%	224	0.78%	-6,044	-21.04%	28,716
Wayne	17,056	38.18%	27,286	61.09%	326	0.73%	-10,230	-22.91%	44,668
Westchester	287,434	62.78%	167,795	36.65%	2,609	0.57%	119,639	26.13%	457,838
Wyoming	4,929	25.72%	14,112	73.63%	125	0.65%	-9,183	-47.91%	19,166
Yates	4,401	41.48%	6,098	57.48%	110	1.04%	-1,697	-16.00%	10,609
Totals	4,619,195	55.65%	3,578,899	43.12%	102,117	1.23%	1,040,296	12.53%	8,300,211

Counties that flipped from Democratic to Republican

- Clinton (county seat: Plattsburgh)
- Nassau (county seat: Mineola)
- Rockland (county seat: New City)

==== By congressional district ====
Harris won 19 of 26 congressional districts, while Trump won seven. Each candidate won a district held by the other party.

District	Harris	Trump	Representative
1st	44%	54%	Nick LaLota
2nd	43%	56%	Andrew Garbarino
3rd	47%	51%	Tom Suozzi
4th	50%	49%	Laura Gillen
5th	70%	28%	Gregory Meeks
6th	52%	46%	Grace Meng
7th	72%	26%	Nydia Velázquez
8th	71%	27%	Hakeem Jeffries
9th	69%	29%	Yvette Clarke
10th	79%	19%	Dan Goldman
11th	37%	61%	Nicole Malliotakis
12th	81%	17%	Jerry Nadler
13th	79%	20%	Adriano Espaillat
14th	65%	33%	Alexandria Ocasio-Cortez
15th	74%	25%	Ritchie Torres
16th	66%	33%	
16th	66%	33%	George Latimer
17th	50%	49%	Mike Lawler
18th	51%	48%	Pat Ryan
19th	50%	49%	
19th	50%	49%	Josh Riley
20th	56%	42%	Paul Tonko
21st	39%	60%	Elise Stefanik
22nd	54%	46%	
22nd	54%	46%	John Mannion
23rd	39%	60%	Nick Langworthy
24th	38%	61%	Claudia Tenney
25th	59%	40%	Joseph Morelle
26th	59%	40%	Tim Kennedy

== Analysis ==
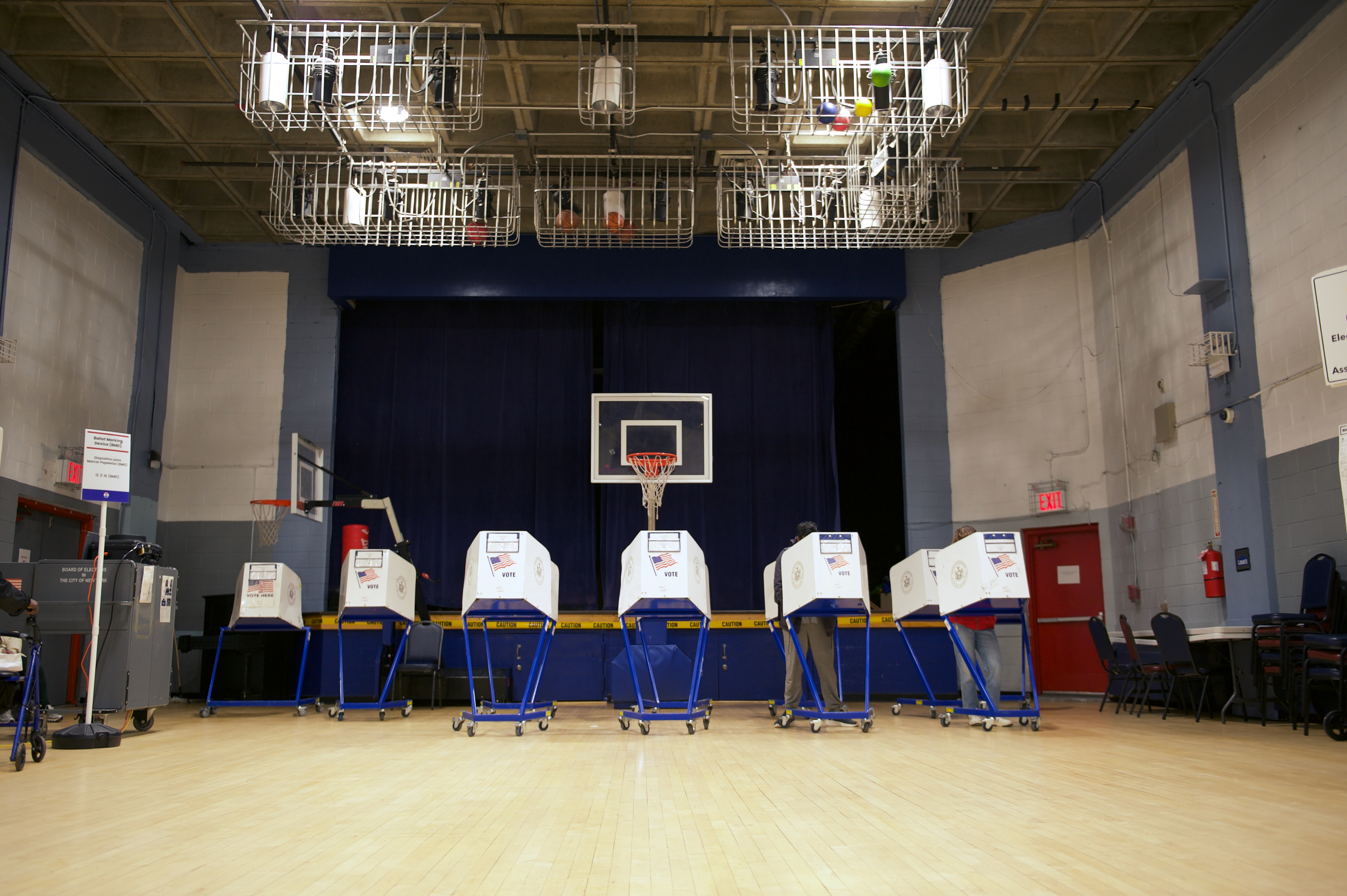
New Yorkers voting in a polling location near Lincoln Square

A heavily populated Middle Atlantic state, New York is considered a blue state, not having voted for a Republican presidential candidate since Ronald Reagan in 1984. New York continued that trend in 2024, but Democrats saw a huge underperformance compared to past elections. Harris had the worst performance in New York City since 1988, winning the city by just 68-30%, with Trump the first Republican to win over 30% of the vote in the city since George H. W. Bush in 1988.

All counties in the state except for Hamilton, Yates, and Tompkins swung toward the Republicans in 2024. If the five boroughs of New York City are excluded, Trump won the state with 2,740,061 votes to Harris's 2,715,851 votes, or 48.6% to 48.2%, thereby making him the first Republican to do so since 1988. Trump was the first Republican to carry Clinton County since 1992, Nassau County since 1988, and Rockland County since 2004.

Trump also made major gains in all five New York City boroughs, with particularly dramatic shifts in the Bronx and Queens, both of which moved over 20 points towards the Republicans compared to 2020. In Queens (28% Hispanic and 27% Asian), Trump secured 37% of the vote, in Brooklyn (19% Hispanic and 14% Asian) he won 27% of the vote, and in Manhattan (24% Hispanic and 13% Asian) he received 17%, all of which were the highest for a Republican presidential candidate since 1988. In The Bronx (56% Hispanic), Trump received 27% of the vote, and traditionally Republican Staten Island gave him 64% of the vote, both the highest for a Republican since 1984. These shifts were driven in part by increased support among Hispanic and Asian communities.

Trump significantly improved his support among Hispanic voters, particularly in New York. According to Fox News voter analysis, Trump won 36% of the Latino vote in the state, a major increase from the 25% he received in 2020. This trend was not limited to New York; similar gains were observed nationwide, as Trump made inroads with Latino communities across various states, including Florida, Texas, California, Massachusetts, Illinois, and neighboring New Jersey.

Trump continued to make large gains in the state's Asian communities as well. On the Assembly District level, Trump flipped seven districts within New York City, four of which have large Asian populations. Areas including southern Brooklyn and northeastern Queens, which have large concentrations of Chinese-Americans, had among the largest swings to Donald Trump in the city. New York’s 6th congressional district, which is 45% Asian and represented by Grace Meng, was only won by Harris by 6%. This pattern was repeated across heavily Asian communities across the country. Voters cited crime and the homelessness crisis in the city as primary motivators in changing their traditionally Democratic vote for Trump.

Despite his gains, Trump became the first Republican to ever win the White House without winning Essex or Saratoga counties. Tompkins County (home to Cornell University) voted to the left of every county in the state except for Manhattan, itself home to Columbia University.

== See also ==
- United States presidential elections in New York
- 2024 United States presidential election
- 2024 Democratic Party presidential primaries
- 2024 Republican Party presidential primaries
- 2024 United States elections

== Notes ==
Partisan clients
