= Priscilla A. Wooten =

American politician

Member of the New York City Council from the 42nd district
- In office January 1, 1992 – December 31, 2001
- Preceded by: District created
- Succeeded by: Charles Barron

Member of the New York City Council from the 24th district
- In office January 1, 1983 – December 31, 1991
- Preceded by: Leon A. Katz
- Succeeded by: Morton Povman

Personal details
- Born: March 31, 1936 Aiken, South Carolina
- Died: February 15, 2017 (aged 80) Brooklyn, New York City, New York
- Party: Democratic

Priscilla A. Wooten (March 31, 1936 – February 15, 2017) was an American politician who served in the New York City Council from 1983 to 2001.

In 1997, Wooten was the first African-American to endorse Mayor Rudy Giuliani's ultimately successful re-election campaign.

She died on February 15, 2017, in Brooklyn, New York City, New York at age 80.
