= Chris Banks (politician) =

American politician (born 1984)

Member of the New York City Council from the 42nd district
- Incumbent
- Assumed office January 1, 2024
- Preceded by: Charles Barron

Personal details
- Born: September 30, 1984 (age 42) Brooklyn, New York, U.S.
- Party: Democratic

Chris Banks is an American politician who is a member of the New York City Council for the 42nd district. He took office in January 2024.

== Early life ==
Banks was born in the East New York neighborhood of Brooklyn. His mother was an immigrant from Trinidad and Tobago, and his father was from Houston, Texas.

== Career ==
In 2012, Banks ran for the 60th district in the New York State Assembly, losing the Democratic primary to incumbent Inez Barron. He subsequently challenged Inez Barron and her husband Charles Barron four more times unsuccessfully in Assembly and district leader races.

In 2023, Banks ran for the 42nd New York City Council district. He defeated incumbent Charles Barron in the primary, and won the general election unopposed. Barron had a history of making controversial statements, including expressions of support for Robert Mugabe and Muammar Gaddafi.

Before his election, Banks was a community activist. His experience includes being a member of Community Board 5, president of the New York Police Department’s 75th Precinct Community Council, and the founder of the East New York Coalition, a group that advocated against additional homeless shelters in East New York.

Banks voted against The City of Yes on Thursday December 5, 2024 that will create more affordable housing in New York City.

== Electoral history ==
=== 2025 ===
2025 New York City Council election, District 42
Party	Candidate	Votes	%
Democratic	Chris Banks (incumbent)	23,336	95.5
Freedom	Davon L. Phillips	1,045	4.3
Write-in		45	0.2
Total votes		24,426	100.0
Democratic hold			

=== 2023 ===
2023 New York City Council Democratic primary, District 42
Party	Candidate	Votes	%
Democratic	Chris Banks	3,134	50.7
Democratic	Charles Barron (incumbent)	2,633	42.6
Democratic	Jamilah Rose	356	5.8
Write-in		54	0.9
Total votes		6,177	100.0

2023 New York City Council election, District 42
Party	Candidate	Votes	%
Democratic	Chris Banks	6,753	97.3
Write-in		185	2.7
Total votes		6,938	100.0
Democratic hold			

=== 2014 ===
2014 New York State Assembly Democratic primary, District 60
Party	Candidate	Votes	%
Democratic	Charles Barron	4,082	63.1
Democratic	Chris Banks	2,370	36.7
Write-in		14	0.2
Total votes		6,466	100.0

=== 2013 ===
2013 New York City Council Democratic primary, District 42
Party	Candidate	Votes	%
Democratic	Inez D. Barron	5,887	43.2
Democratic	Chris Banks	3,359	24.7
Democratic	Regina Powell	1,178	8.7
Democratic	John C. Whitehead	1,037	7.6
Democratic	Nikki Lucas	908	6.7
Democratic	Sean K. Henry	813	6.0
Democratic	Prince D. Lewis	431	3.2
Write-in		2	0.0
Total votes		13,615	100.0

=== 2012 ===
2012 New York State Assembly Democratic primary, District 60
Party	Candidate	Votes	%
Democratic	Inez D. Barron	2,962	55.5
Democratic	Chris Banks	2,364	44.3
Write-in		15	0.3
Total votes		5,341	100.0
