= Leon A. Katz =

American politician (1931–1993)

Member of the New York City Council from the 24th district
- In office January 1, 1974 – December 31, 1982
- Preceded by: Monroe Cohen
- Succeeded by: Priscilla A. Wooten

Member of the New York City Council from the 26th district
- In office January 1, 1970 – December 31, 1973
- Preceded by: Kenneth S. Knigin
- Succeeded by: Samuel D. Wright

Personal details
- Born: 1931
- Died: September 13, 1993 (aged 61–62); Englewood, New Jersey
- Political party: Democratic

Leon A. Katz (1931 – September 13, 1993) was an American politician who served in the New York City Council from 1970 to 1982.

He died of a heart attack on September 13, 1993, in Englewood, New Jersey, at age 62.
