= Henry Bramwell =

American judge (1919–2010)

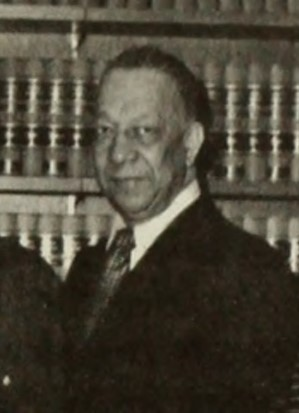

Senior Judge of the United States District Court for the Eastern District of New York
- In office October 1, 1987 – May 28, 2010

Judge of the United States District Court for the Eastern District of New York
- In office December 26, 1974 – October 1, 1987
- Appointed by: Gerald Ford
- Preceded by: John R. Bartels
- Succeeded by: Arthur Spatt

Personal details
- Born: Henry Bramwell; September 3, 1919 Brooklyn, New York
- Died: May 28, 2010 (aged 90)
- Education: Brooklyn Law School (LL.B.)

Henry Bramwell (September 3, 1919 – May 28, 2010) was a United States district judge of the United States District Court for the Eastern District of New York.

== Education and career ==
Bramwell was born in Brooklyn, New York. He was in the United States Army from 1941 to 1945. In 1944, he was a sergeant. After his military service, he received a Bachelor of Laws from Brooklyn Law School in 1948. He was an Assistant United States Attorney for the Eastern District of New York from 1953 to 1961. He was then an associate counsel to the New York State Rent Commission from 1961 to 1963. He was a special hearing officer for conscientious objectors from 1965 to 1966. He was a judge of the Civil Court of the City of New York in 1966 and again from 1969 to 1975. He was an assistant administrative judge for Kings County, New York from 1974 to 1975.

== Federal judicial service ==
On December 11, 1974, Bramwell was nominated by President Gerald Ford to a seat on the United States District Court for the Eastern District of New York vacated by Judge John R. Bartels. Bramwell was confirmed by the United States Senate on December 20, 1974, and received his commission on December 26, 1974. He assumed senior status on October 1, 1987, and served in that capacity until his death, on May 28, 2010.

== See also ==
- List of African-American federal judges
- List of African-American jurists
- List of first minority male lawyers and judges in New York

== Sources ==
- Henry Bramwell's obituary archived

Legal offices
Preceded by John R. Bartels	Judge of the United States District Court for the Eastern District of New York; 1974–1987	Succeeded by Arthur Spatt
