= Janele Hyer-Spencer =

American politician

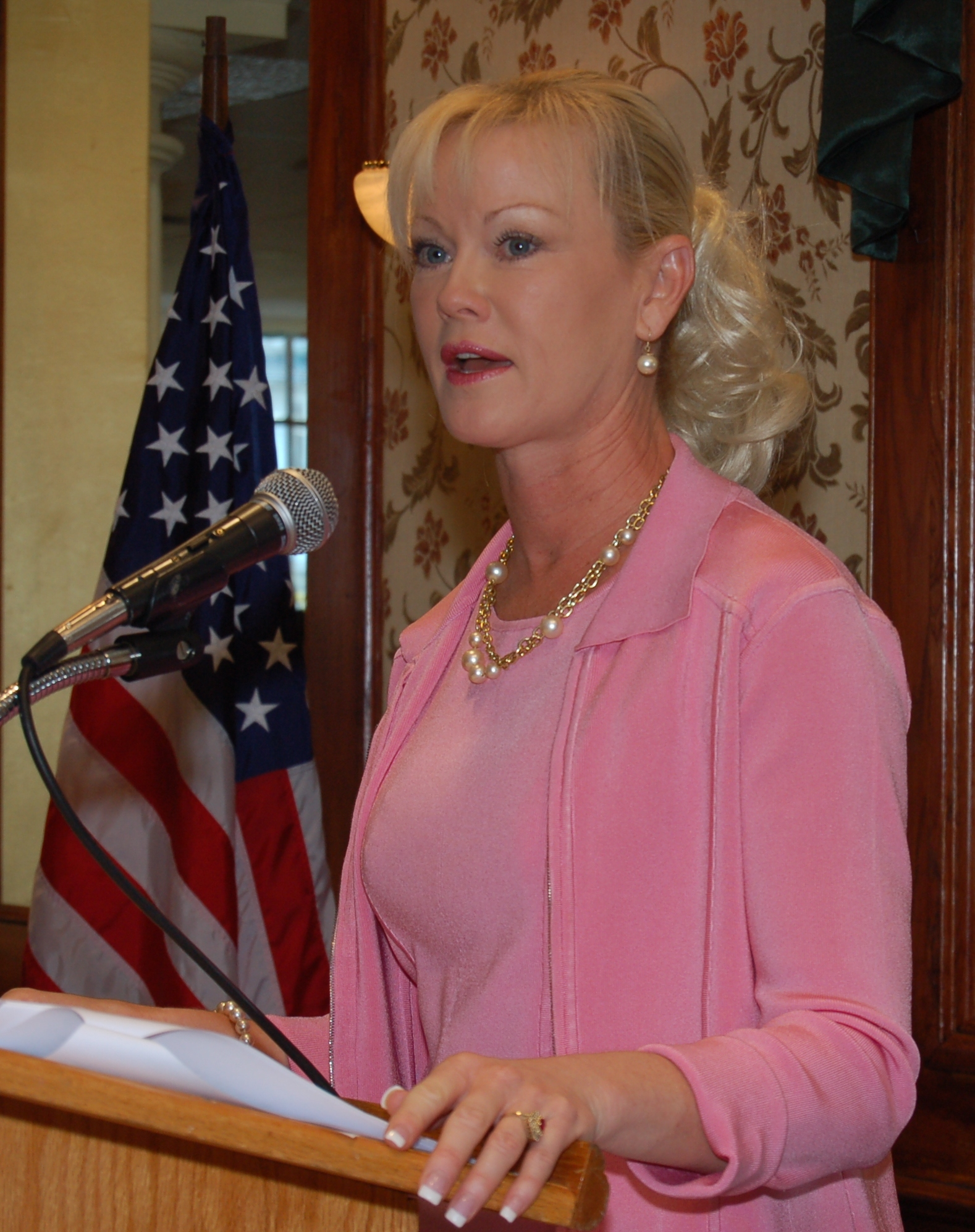

Member of the New York State Assembly from the 60th district
- In office January 1, 2007 – December 31, 2010
- Preceded by: Matthew Mirones
- Succeeded by: Nicole Malliotakis

Personal details
- Born: Donna Janele Hyer; October 24, 1964 (age 62)
- Party: Democratic
- Spouse: Douglas Spencer
- Education: Columbia College Chicago (BA); CUNY School of Law (JD); Queens College (MA)
- Profession: Attorney, politician
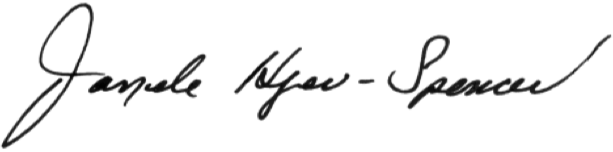
- Signature
- Website: www.janele.com

Donna Janele Hyer-Spencer (born October 24, 1964) is an American attorney and former politician. Hyer-Spencer represented New York's 60th Assembly District, which covers parts of Staten Island and Brooklyn, from 2007 to 2010. She is a Democrat.

== Early life and education ==
Hyer-Spencer attended high school in Lake Zurich, Illinois, where she ran track and cross country and played golf.

Hyer-Spencer earned a bachelor's degree from Columbia College Chicago. She played basketball in college. She graduated from CUNY School of Law with a J.D. and also graduated from Queens College with a Master of Arts degree in Public Policy.

== Career ==
Hyer-Spencer became a litigation attorney for the New York City Administration for Children's Services, specializing in child abuse and neglect. Hyer-Spencer practiced in all five boroughs of the City of New York and the Integrated Domestic Violence Courts. She later joined the ACS legal Counsel unit, where she was responsible for negotiating and resolving class actions and civil lawsuits.

Hyer-Spencer served as the Legal Director of My Sister's Place, a New York City-based non-profit organization which helps victims of domestic violence.

=== New York State Assembly ===
Hyer-Spencer was first elected to the New York State Assembly in November 2006, narrowly defeating her Republican opponent to win a seat vacated by Republican Matthew Mirones. In 2010, Hyer-Spencer was defeated by Republican Nicole Malliotakis with 55% of the vote. Following her 2010 defeat, Hyer-Spencer packed up her district office and failed to pass constituent files on to Malliotakis.

==== Domestic violence ====
Upon taking office, Hyer-Spencer vowed to be a voice for victims of violence and abuse. Speaking on the floor of the New York State Assembly in her first term, she advocated for stronger penalties for child sex abusers. During her tenure, several domestic violence-related bills sponsored by Hyer-Spencer became law. Hyer-Spencer sponsored a bill to eliminate fees on Orders of Protection to remove financial roadblocks from victims seeking protections; the bill became law.

==== Education and health care ====
In 2008, Hyer-Spencer told voters that she would advocate for education and health care that is "a right not a privilege". In 2010, she voted against a budget extender bill that included education spending cuts. She also developed the Hyer Hopes Awards honoring students from selected elementary, intermediate, and high schools throughout Staten Island and Bay Ridge who demonstrated significant improvement in academic achievement, or succeeded by overcoming adverse conditions.

==== Environment ====
Hyer-Spencer used her role on the State's Energy Committee to partner with Josh Fox, an Oscar-nominated film director, to educate the public and advocate a ban on natural gas drilling within New York City's watershed.

=== Honors ===
Hyer-Spencer was awarded the Verrazano Narrows award from the Staten Island Economic Development Corporation for her work promoting economic development, where she drafted and sponsored legislation to create the first ever "Green Zone" to attract and encourage environmentally green businesses to Staten Island. She was also recognized for her efforts to motivate, mentor, and inspire Staten Island business women by founding and funding the Women's Leadership Council. Her local awards also include recognition by the Alzheimer's Foundation of Staten Island for her commitment and advocacy on behalf of those combating the brain disorder.

=== Community service ===
Hyer-Spencer was chosen by the American Cancer Society to present a public service announcement highlighting her father's battle with cancer and struggle with maintaining health insurance. She was recognized for her commitment to the Dress for Success campaign where she sponsored a yearly drive to benefit women re-entering the work force.

== Post-Assembly career ==
In September 2011, Hyer-Spencer was hired by the New York State Education Department as a federal legislative liaison. A former state employee alleged that Sheldon Silver concocted a scheme to fire her from her job so that Hyer-Spencer could be hired.

== Personal life ==
During her Assembly tenure, Hyer-Spencer resided in Staten Island with her husband, Douglas Spencer. As of 2009, she had run in three New York City Marathons, with a best time of 4 hours and 20 minutes. In a Staten Island Advance interview, she stated she runs 5 days a week, and over 25 hours a week.

While in the State Assembly, she was noted for commuting to Albany via motorcycle, riding a Yamaha V-Star with the custom license plate JANELE.

In court papers unsealed during the sentencing phase of the criminal trial of former Assembly Speaker Sheldon Silver, the federal government stated that it had evidence that Silver had engaged in extramarital affairs with two people; the names were redacted, but other sources identified one of the people as Hyer-Spencer. Hyer-Spencer's attorney denied the allegations.

New York State Assembly
Preceded by Matthew Mirones	New York State Assembly, 60th District; 2007–2010	Succeeded by Nicole Malliotakis
Party political offices
Preceded by James Hart	Democratic Party nominee for New York State Assembly, 60th District; 2004–2010	Succeeded by Inez Barron
