= Nicole Malliotakis =

American politician (born 1980)

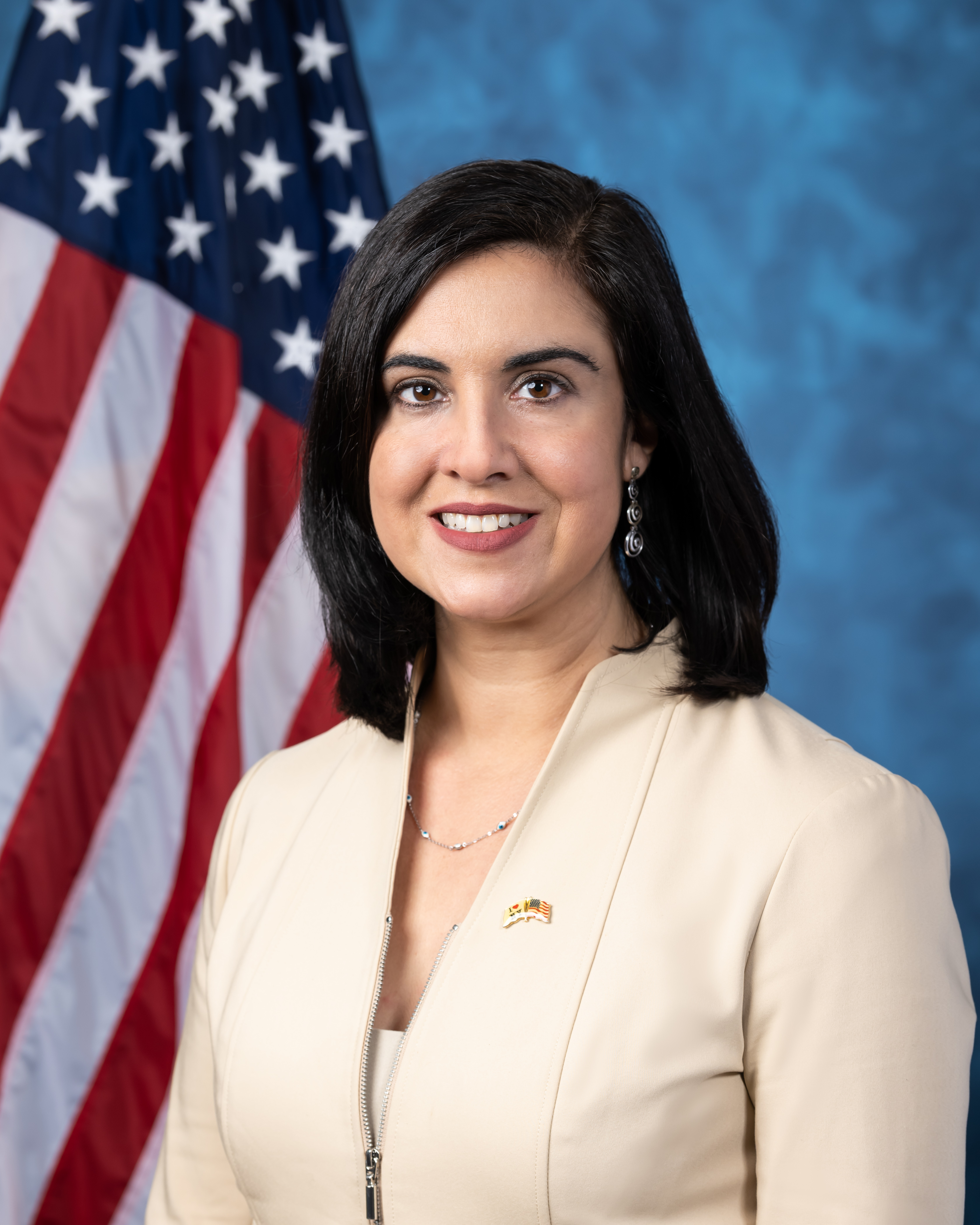
- Official portrait, 2020

Member of the U.S. House of Representatives from New York's 11th district
- Incumbent
- Assumed office January 3, 2021
- Preceded by: Max Rose

Member of the New York State Assembly
- In office January 1, 2011 – January 1, 2021
- Preceded by: Janele Hyer-Spencer
- Succeeded by: Michael Tannousis
- Constituency: 60th district (2011–2012); 64th district (2013–2021)

Personal details
- Born: November 11, 1980 (age 46) New York City, U.S.
- Party: Republican
- Education: Seton Hall University (BA); Wagner College (MBA)
- Website: House website Campaign website

Nicole Malliotakis (/ˌmæliəˈtɑːkɪs/ MAL-ee-ə-TAH-kiss; born November 11, 1980) is an American politician serving as the U.S. representative for New York's 11th congressional district. Her district covers Staten Island and a portion of southern Brooklyn.

A Republican, Malliotakis was first elected to the New York State Assembly in 2010. She represented New York's 60th Assembly district from 2011 to 2012 and then represented New York's 64th Assembly district from 2013 to 2021. While serving in the Assembly, Malliotakis was the Republican nominee for mayor of New York City in the 2017 election; she was defeated by incumbent Democratic mayor Bill de Blasio. In 2020, she ran for Congress and won, defeating incumbent Democratic U.S. representative Max Rose. Malliotakis has represented New York's 11th congressional district since 2021. As of 2025, she is the only Republican representing New York City in Congress.

== Early life and education ==
Malliotakis was born on November 11, 1980, in Manhattan, New York City. She moved to Staten Island when she was two years old and grew up in Great Kills. Malliotakis' father is from Crete, Greece and her mother is from Cuba, having left Cuba in 1959 following the rise of Fidel Castro. Malliotakis was baptized into the Greek Orthodox Church and was raised in the Greek Orthodox faith.

Malliotakis graduated from New Dorp High School on Staten Island in 1998. During her senior year, she was elected class president. She received a B.A. in communications from Seton Hall University in 2001 and a Master of Business Administration (MBA) from Wagner College in 2010.

== Early career ==
Malliotakis worked as a community liaison for state senator John Marchi from 2003–04 and for Governor George Pataki from 2004–06. Before her election to the Assembly, she worked on state energy policy as the Consolidated Edison Company of New York's public affairs manager.

In November 2015, U.S. senator Marco Rubio of Florida named Malliotakis the New York chair of his 2016 presidential campaign.

== New York State Assembly ==
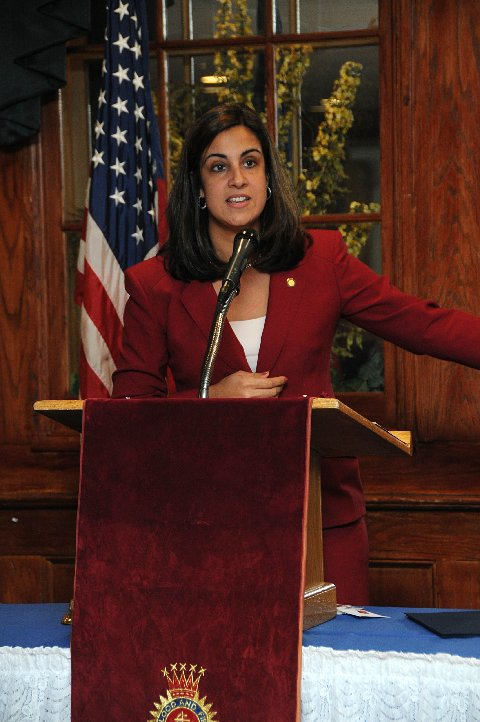
Malliotakis in 2012

In 2010, Malliotakis won the election to represent the 60th District in the New York State Assembly, defeating two-term Democratic incumbent Janele Hyer-Spencer by 10 percentage points. Upon her election to the Assembly, she became the first Greek-American woman elected to office in New York State, the first Cuban-American woman elected to office in New York State, and the first person of Hispanic descent elected from Staten Island. As of January 2018, she was one of only two Republicans from the City of New York serving in the Assembly, along with Michael Reilly. Malliotakis was Brooklyn's only Republican lawmaker.

In October 2011, Malliotakis submitted an amicus curiae brief in support of an American Automobile Association lawsuit against the Port Authority in federal court, arguing that recent toll increases were illegal. She successfully brought an Article 78 proceeding in New York State Supreme Court to get the Port Authority to disclose the results of an economic impact study on the effect the toll increases had had on business at New York Container Terminal.

Malliotakis was reelected in 2012 with 61% of the vote and in 2014 with 73% of the vote in both Brooklyn and Staten Island. After U.S. representative Michael Grimm's resignation in 2014, she was mentioned as a top contender for his seat, but decided against a run.

She made elder rights a hallmark of her tenure and successfully fought to keep a senior center in Staten Island from being closed.

Malliotakis held a series of forums on the MTA Payroll Mobility Tax and its alleged negative impact on small businesses, nonprofit organizations, and private schools. The New York state legislature and Governor Andrew Cuomo subsequently enacted significant repeals. Malliotakis fought for relief from the September 2011 toll increase on Port Authority bridges, calling for divestment of costly non-essential real estate holdings and highlighting mismanaged contributions to community organizations.

== 2017 New York City mayoral campaign ==
Mayoral campaign logo

On April 25, 2017, Malliotakis filed as a Republican candidate for mayor of New York City in the 2017 election. She won the Republican nomination unopposed after businessman Paul Massey dropped out in June over money concerns. On November 7, 2017, Malliotakis lost the election to incumbent Democratic mayor Bill de Blasio, 66% to 28%.

== U.S. House of Representatives ==
=== Elections ===
==== 2020 ====
In 2020, Malliotakis ran as the Republican nominee for New York's 11th congressional district against incumbent Democrat Max Rose.

The race was considered the only potentially competitive House race in New York City. The 11th is by far the most conservative district of the 12 that divide New York City, and one of the most conservative urban districts in the country. The GOP had held the seat for all but one term since 1980 before Rose won the seat in an upset in the 2018 midterm elections.

Malliotakis endorsed incumbent Republican president Donald Trump in the 2020 presidential election; in turn, Trump announced, "Nicole has my Complete & Total Endorsement!" She embraced Trump's backing, saying, "I am honored by President Trump's endorsement and his words of support ... I plan to defeat Max Rose and return New York's 11th Congressional District to commonsense leadership."

Malliotakis declared victory upon taking a commanding lead in election day returns on November 3. Rose did not immediately concede, citing absentee votes yet to be counted. As it became apparent that Malliotakis's lead was too large to overcome, Rose conceded on November 12. Malliotakis took 53% of the vote to Rose's 47%.

==== 2022 ====
In 2022, Malliotakis ran for a second term against former Democratic congressman Max Rose in a rematch of her previous race. She declared victory on election night, and Rose conceded defeat shortly afterward; Malliotakis took 62% of the vote to Rose's 38%.

==== 2024 ====
In 2024, Nicole Malliotakis was re-elected for a third term in the United States House of Representatives, defeating Democratic challenger Andrea Morse. Nicole Malliotakis garnered 64% of the vote, compared to Morse's 36%, securing a decisive victory in New York's 11th congressional district.

=== Tenure ===
New York's 11th congressional district covers Staten Island and a portion of southern Brooklyn.

In January 2021, Malliotakis was appointed as the Assistant Minority Whip for the Republican Conference, the House Committees On Foreign Affairs and Transportation & Infrastructure, as well as the Select Subcommittee on the Coronavirus.

On February 4, 2021, Malliotakis joined 10 other Republican House members and all Democrats in voting to strip Marjorie Taylor Greene of her House Education and Labor Committee and House Budget Committee assignments in response to controversial political statements she had made. Malliotakis called Greene’s comments "extraordinarily offensive and hurtful to thousands of 9/11 families and first responders, our Jewish community and many others in my district."

On November 5, 2021, Malliotakis joined 12 other Republicans in voting for the Infrastructure Investment and Jobs Act, which passed the House 228–206.

In January 2023, Malliotakis was selected to serve on the House Committee on Ways and Means in the 118th Congress; she is the only House member from New York City to serve on the committee this term and the first Republican from the city to serve on the committee in 30 years.

On July 3, 2025, Malliotakis voted in favor of the One Big Beautiful Bill Act, which was signed into law by President Donald Trump the following day.

As of 2025, Malliotakis is the only Republican representing New York City in Congress.

On February 3, 2026 she announced that SSG Michael H. Ollis of Staten Island would posthumously have his Distinguished Service Cross elevated to the Medal of Honor after it had been approved by President Donald Trump.

In April 2026, Malliotakis was one of six Republicans who joined all Democrats in voting to grant Temporary Protected Status to approximately 350,000 Haitian immigrants, despite efforts by Donald Trump to terminate the program.

=== Committee assignments ===
For the 119th Congress:

- Committee on Ways and Means
  - Subcommittee on Oversight
  - Subcommittee on Tax
- Joint Economic Committee

=== Caucus memberships ===
- Climate Solutions Caucus
- Congressional Western Caucus
- Conservative Climate Caucus
- Republican Governance Group
- Republican Study Committee
- Republican Main Street Partnership
- Rare Disease Caucus
- Congressional Hellenic Caucus
- Congressional Hellenic Israel Alliance Caucus
- Republican Israel Caucus
- US-Lebanon Friendship Caucus
- Congressional Zoo and Aquarium Caucus
- Law Enforcement Caucus
- Armenian Caucus
- SALT Caucus
- Congressional Taiwan Caucus
- Congressional Ukraine Caucus
- Congressional Egypt Caucus
- Congressional Cigar Caucus
- Friends of Ireland Caucus
- Congressional Hispanic Conference Caucus
- Problem Solvers Caucus

== Political positions ==
Malliotakis has opposed congestion pricing in the most congested parts of Manhattan. In 2024, she said she was looking for "any legislative and legal option" to stop the congestion pricing plan.

Malliotakis opposed raising fees on plastic bags in New York and supports reducing bridge tolls. She proposed a plan to cut property taxes for seniors and to limit increases on property taxes.

=== Abortion ===
During her 2017 campaign for mayor of New York City, Malliotakis said, "I am not against abortion". As a mayoral candidate, she did not identify as pro-life or pro-choice. Rather, she said, "It's not black or white. I think there's a lot of things that go into a decision of that magnitude". She did not support overturning Roe v. Wade, but has voted against taxpayer-funded abortions and against late-term abortion. When she ran for Congress in 2020, however, she identified as pro-life, even as she reiterated that she does not "hold black-and-white views" on abortion.

=== COVID-19 ===
Malliotakis voted against the American Rescue Plan in 2021, but after its passage, she touted aspects of the legislation as one of her "achievements".

=== Donald Trump ===
Malliotakis voted for Donald Trump in the 2016 presidential election. During her mayoral campaign, she said that she regretted voting for Trump and that she would "write in Marco Rubio so that I could tell you I voted for Marco Rubio." In 2020, however, she endorsed and said that she voted for Trump.

Shortly after Joe Biden defeated Trump in the 2020 presidential election, Malliotakis refused to acknowledge Biden's win, echoing Trump's refusal to concede the election. In the aftermath, Malliotakis supported Trump's false claims of election fraud. On January 6, 2021, Malliotakis voted to object to counting either Arizona's or Pennsylvania's electoral votes in the 2020 presidential election based on disproved allegations of voter fraud and unconstitutional procedures. On January 9, more than 300 protesters, including seven New York City and New York State elected officials, gathered outside her Brooklyn office to call for her to either vote to impeach Trump or resign. On January 13, she voted against Trump's second impeachment for inciting the storming of the Capitol.

She again endorsed Trump in 2024.

In the 119th United States Congress, she co-sponsored a pair of resolutions meant to expunge Trump's impeachments.

=== George Santos ===
After Donald Trump commuted the sentence of former representative George Santos in 2025, Malliotakis said:

I do not agree with the commutation. I think it was a wrong decision, primarily because this is somebody who stole [hundreds of thousands] of dollars from his donors. He defrauded the public and his voters.

=== Health care ===
She has criticized the Affordable Care Act, saying it is "strangling the business community."

=== Immigration ===
Malliotakis has repeatedly called for the implementation of additional security measures on the border between the United States and Mexico. She opposes sanctuary city status for illegal immigrants in New York City. While in the State Assembly, Malliotakis said she was "against New York State extending licenses for illegal immigrants".

=== Surveillance ===
In January 2026, Malliotakis was one of 57 Republicans who voted against blocking funding for federally driven “kill switch” vehicle technology, allowing regulators to move forward with systems that could monitor drivers and intervene in vehicle operation.

=== Infrastructure ===
On November 5, 2021, Malliotakis was among the 13 House Republicans who voted with a majority of Democrats to pass the Infrastructure Investment and Jobs Act, a $1.2 trillion infrastructure spending bill.

=== LGBTQ+ rights ===
After originally opposing same-sex marriage as a member of the Assembly, Malliotakis said she regretted that position and voted to support adoptions by same-sex parents and to protect estate rights for married same-sex couples. She repeatedly voted against the Gender Expression Non-Discrimination Act, a New York state law banning discrimination on the basis of gender expression, which she said was too concerned with "bathrooms."

In Congress, Malliotakis voted against the Equality Act. On July 19, 2022, Malliotakis and 46 other Republican Representatives voted for the Respect for Marriage Act, which would codify the right to same-sex marriage in federal law. She said, "In 2017, I expressed my deep regret for voting against a bill legalizing same-sex marriage in New York State while in the state Assembly six years prior. Over the past decade, I have attended two weddings of couples who deserve equal recognition and protection under the law." On December 8, 2022, she and 38 other Republican representatives voted for the final passage of the Respect for Marriage Act.

== Electoral history ==
New York State Assembly District 60, General Election 2010
Party	Candidate	Votes	%	±%
Republican	Nicole Malliotakis	11,742	45.9	+9.2
Conservative	Nicole Malliotakis	2,039	8.0	
Taxpayers	Nicole Malliotakis	163	0.6	
Total	Nicole Malliotakis	13,944	54.5	
Democratic	Janele Hyer-Spencer	9,788	38.2	−10.0
Independence	Janele Hyer-Spencer	853	3.3	
Working Families	Janele Hyer-Spencer	794	3.1	
Total	Janele Hyer-Spencer (incumbent)	11,435	44.7	
Right to Life	Marietta A. Canning	197	0.8	
Write-in		15	0.1	
Total votes		25,591	100.0	
Republican gain from Democratic		Swing	+19.2	

New York State Assembly District 64, General Election 2012
Party	Candidate	Votes	%	±%
Republican	Nicole Malliotakis	17,731	51.5	+7.0
Conservative	Nicole Malliotakis	2,393	6.9	
Independence	Nicole Malliotakis	1,049	3.1	
Total	Nicole Malliotakis (incumbent)	21,173	61.5	
Democratic	John Mancuso	12,328	35.8	−6.3
Working Families	John Mancuso	913	2.7	
Total	John Mancuso	13,241	38.4	
Write-in		33	0.1	
Total votes		34,447	100.0	
Republican hold		Swing	+13.3	

New York State Assembly District 64, General Election 2014
Party	Candidate	Votes	%	±%
Republican	Nicole Malliotakis	12,112	59.0	+11.8
Conservative	Nicole Malliotakis	1,907	9.3	
Independence	Nicole Malliotakis	1,032	5.0	
Total	Nicole Malliotakis (incumbent)	15,051	73.3	
Democratic	Marybeth Melendez	4,788	23.3	−11.8
Working Families	Marybeth Melendez	680	3.3	
Total	Marybeth Melendez	5,468	26.6	
Write-in		27	0.1	
Total votes		20,546	100.0	
Republican hold		Swing	+23.6	

New York State Assembly District 64, General Election 2016
Party	Candidate	Votes	%	±%
Republican	Nicole Malliotakis	26,907	77.0	+18.0
Independence	Nicole Malliotakis	3,629	10.4	
Conservative	Nicole Malliotakis	3,212	9.2	
Reform	Nicole Malliotakis	785	2.2	
Total	Nicole Malliotakis (incumbent)	34,533	98.9	
Write-in		399	1.1	
Total votes		34,932	100.0	
Republican hold		Swing	+29.2	

New York City Mayoral General Election, 2017
Party	Candidate	Votes	%
Democratic	Bill de Blasio	713,634	62.1%
Working Families	Bill de Blasio	46,478	4.0%
Total	Bill de Blasio (incumbent)	760,112	66.1%
Republican	Nicole Malliotakis	274,424	23.9%
Conservative	Nicole Malliotakis	37,197	3.2%
Stop de Blasio	Nicole Malliotakis	5,327	0.5%
Total	Nicole Malliotakis	316,948	27.6%
Reform	Sal Albanese	24,484	2.1%
Green	Akeem Browder	16,536	1.4%
Small Cities Party	Michael Tolkin	11,309	1.0%
Independent	Bo Dietl	11,163	1.0%
Libertarian	Aaron Commey	2,770	1.0%
Write-in		5,343	0.5%
Total votes		1,148,665	100.00%
Democratic hold			

New York State Assembly District 64, Reform Primary 2018
Party	Candidate	Votes	%
Reform	Nicole Malliotakis	248	92.2
Write-in		21	7.8
Total votes		269	100.0

New York State Assembly District 64, General Election 2018
Party	Candidate	Votes	%	±%
Republican	Nicole Malliotakis	17,971	51.7	−25.3
Conservative	Nicole Malliotakis	1,835	5.3	
Independence	Nicole Malliotakis	861	2.5	
Reform	Nicole Malliotakis	226	0.6	
Total	Nicole Malliotakis (incumbent)	20,893	60.1	
Democratic	Adam Baumel	13,838	39.8	
Write-in		40	0.1	
Total votes		34,771	100.0	
Republican hold		Swing	-20.7	

New York's 11th congressional district Republican primary results, 2020
Party	Candidate	Votes	%
Republican	Nicole Malliotakis	15,697	69.0
Republican	Joe Caldarera	7,046	31.0
Total votes		22,743	100.0

New York's 11th congressional district, 2020 general election
Party	Candidate	Votes	%
Republican	Nicole Malliotakis	143,420	49.0
Conservative	Nicole Malliotakis	12,188	4.2
Total	Nicole Malliotakis	155,608	53.2
Democratic	Max Rose	134,625	46.0
Independence	Max Rose	2,573	0.8
Total	Max Rose (incumbent)	137,198	46.8
Total votes		292,806	100.0
Republican gain from Democratic			

New York's 11th congressional district, 2022
Party	Candidate	Votes	%
Republican	Nicole Malliotakis	107,989	57.4
Conservative	Nicole Malliotakis	8,003	4.2
Total	Nicole Malliotakis (incumbent)	115,992	61.6
Democratic	Max Rose	71,801	38.1
Write-in		306	0.16
Total votes		185,838	100.0
Republican hold			

New York's 11th congressional district, 2024
Party	Candidate	Votes	%
Republican	Nicole Malliotakis	147,504	59.12
Conservative	Nicole Malliotakis	13,404	5.37
Total	Nicole Malliotakis (incumbent)	160,908	64.49
Democratic	Andrea Morse	87,640	35.12
Write-in		968	0.16
Total votes		249,516	100.0
Republican hold			

== Personal life ==
Malliotakis is multilingual. She speaks English and Spanish fluently and also speaks some Greek.

== See also ==
- List of Hispanic and Latino Americans in the United States Congress
- Women in the United States House of Representatives

New York State Assembly
Preceded by Janele Hyer-Spencer	Member of the New York State Assembly from the 60th district 2011–2012	Succeeded by Inez Barron
Preceded by Sheldon Silver	Member of the New York State Assembly from the 64th district 2013–2020	Succeeded by Michael Tannousis
Party political offices
Preceded by Joe Lhota	Republican nominee for Mayor of New York City; 2017	Succeeded by Curtis Sliwa
U.S. House of Representatives
Preceded by Max Rose	Member of the U.S. House of Representatives from New York's 11th congressional district 2021–present	Incumbent
U.S. order of precedence (ceremonial)
Preceded by Nancy Mace	United States representatives by seniority 261st	Succeeded by Tracey Mann
