= Eric R. Komitee =

American judge (born 1970)

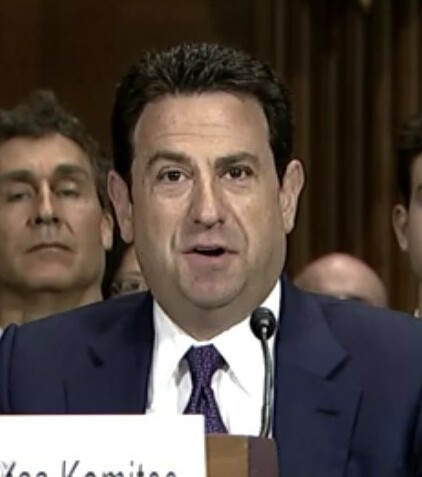

Judge of the United States District Court for the Eastern District of New York
- Incumbent
- Assumed office December 5, 2019
- Appointed by: Donald Trump
- Preceded by: Eric N. Vitaliano

Personal details
- Born: Eric Ross Komitee; 1970 (age 54–55) Freeport, New York, U.S.
- Education: Emory University (BA); New York University (JD)

Eric Ross Komitee (born 1970) is a United States district judge of the United States District Court for the Eastern District of New York.

== Education ==
Komitee earned his Bachelor of Arts, with high honors, from Emory University in 1992, where he was inducted into Phi Beta Kappa, and his Juris Doctor, cum laude, from the New York University School of Law in 1995, where he served as the senior notes and comments editor of the New York University Law Review.

== Legal career ==
After graduating from law school, he served as a law clerk to Judge James Larry Edmondson of the United States Court of Appeals for the Eleventh Circuit from 1995 to 1996. He has practiced from 1996 to 2000 as an associate in the Government Enforcement and White Collar Crime group of Skadden, Arps, Slate, Meagher & Flom and as an associate in the corporate practice group of Cravath Swaine & Moore. He previously served for eight years as an Assistant United States Attorney for the Eastern District of New York from 2000 to 2008, rising to serve as Chief of the Business and Securities Fraud Section from 2006 to 2008.

From 2008 to 2019, he served as General Counsel of Viking Global Investors in New York City.

== Federal judicial service ==
In August 2017, Komitee was one of several candidates pitched to New York senators Chuck Schumer and Kirsten Gillibrand by the White House as judicial candidates for vacancies on the federal courts in New York. On May 10, 2018, President Donald Trump announced his intent to nominate Komitee to serve as a United States district judge for the United States District Court for the Eastern District of New York. On May 15, 2018, his nomination was sent to the Senate. He was nominated to the seat that was vacated by Judge Eric N. Vitaliano, who assumed senior status on February 28, 2017. On August 1, 2018, a hearing on his nomination was held before the Senate Judiciary Committee. On September 13, 2018, his nomination was reported out of committee by a 21–0 vote.

On January 3, 2019, his nomination was returned to the President under Rule XXXI, Paragraph 6 of the United States Senate. On April 8, 2019, President Trump announced the renomination of Komitee to the district court. On May 21, 2019, his nomination was sent to the Senate. On June 20, 2019, his nomination was reported out of committee by a 21–1 vote. On December 2, 2019, the Senate invoked cloture on his nomination by an 81–5 vote. On December 3, 2019, his nomination was confirmed by an 86–4 vote. He received his judicial commission on December 5, 2019.

== See also ==
- List of Jewish American jurists

Legal offices
Preceded by Eric N. Vitaliano	Judge of the United States District Court for the Eastern District of New York; 2019–present	Incumbent
