= Arthur Spatt =

American judge (1925–2020)

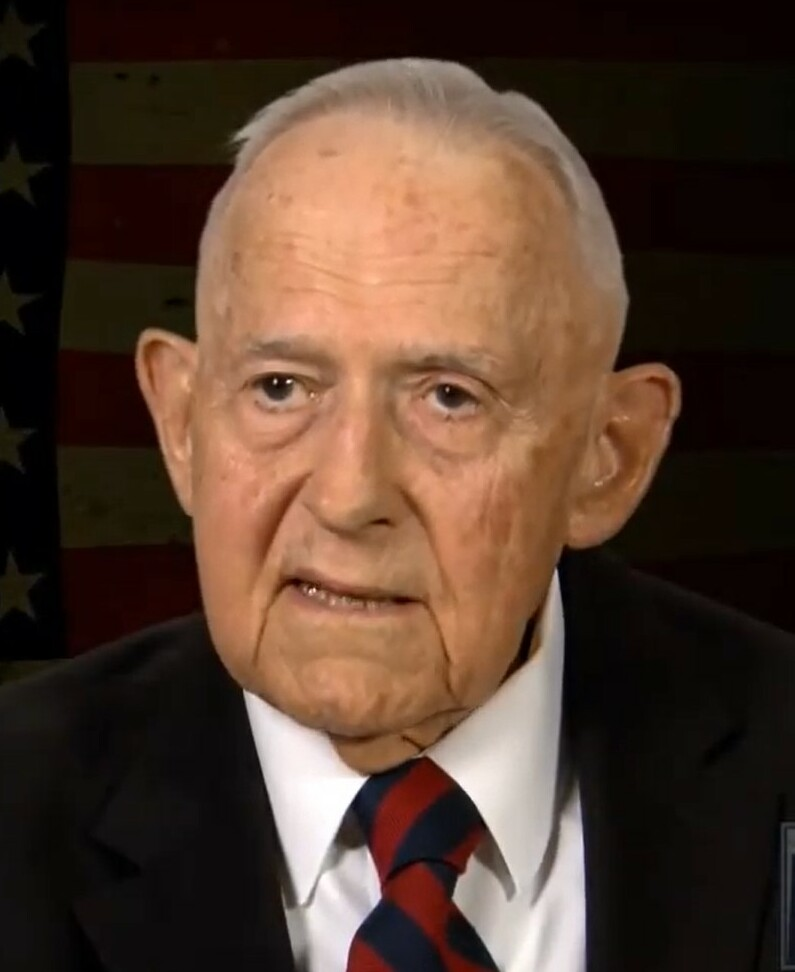
- Spatt in 2014

Senior Judge of the United States District Court for the Eastern District of New York
- In office December 1, 2004 – June 12, 2020

Judge of the United States District Court for the Eastern District of New York
- In office November 27, 1989 – December 1, 2004
- Appointed by: George H. W. Bush
- Preceded by: Henry Bramwell
- Succeeded by: Eric N. Vitaliano

Personal details
- Born: Arthur Donald Spatt; December 13, 1925 Brooklyn, New York
- Died: June 12, 2020 (aged 94) Commack, New York
- Education: Brooklyn Law School (LLB)

Arthur Donald Spatt (December 13, 1925 – June 12, 2020) was a United States district judge of the United States District Court for the Eastern District of New York.

== Education and career ==
Born in Brooklyn, New York, Spatt was a Navigation Petty Officer in the United States Navy from 1944 to 1946, and received a Bachelor of Laws from Brooklyn Law School in 1949. He was in private practice in New York City from 1949 to 1978. He was a state court judge in the Supreme Court of the State of New York, Tenth Judicial District from 1978 to 1982, then an Administrative judge of Nassau County from 1982 to 1986, and an associate justice of the New York Appellate Division, Second Judicial Department, from 1986 to 1989.

== Federal judicial service ==
On October 25, 1989, Spatt was nominated by President George H. W. Bush to a seat on the United States District Court for the Eastern District of New York vacated by Henry Bramwell. Spatt was confirmed by the United States Senate on November 21, 1989, and received commission on November 27, 1989. He assumed senior status on December 1, 2004. His service terminated on June 12, 2020, due to his death at his home in Commack, New York, of the effects of blood cancer.

== Notable rulings ==
Spatt penned the ruling in the Mahender and Varsha Sabhnani slavery federal criminal trial. He awarded rare double damages to Indonesian maids - Samirah, $620,744, and Enung, $315,802. The judgment's award of double damages in federal criminal trials is notable, since the punitive sums are only, ordinarily granted in civil cases. On August 20, 2012 Spatt suspended a Nassau County law that would have allowed County Executive Edward Mangano to reduce negotiated employee benefits.

== See also ==
- List of Jewish American jurists

Legal offices
Preceded by Henry Bramwell	Judge of the United States District Court for the Eastern District of New York; 1989–2004	Succeeded by Eric N. Vitaliano
