= Charles Barron =

American activist and politician (born 1950)

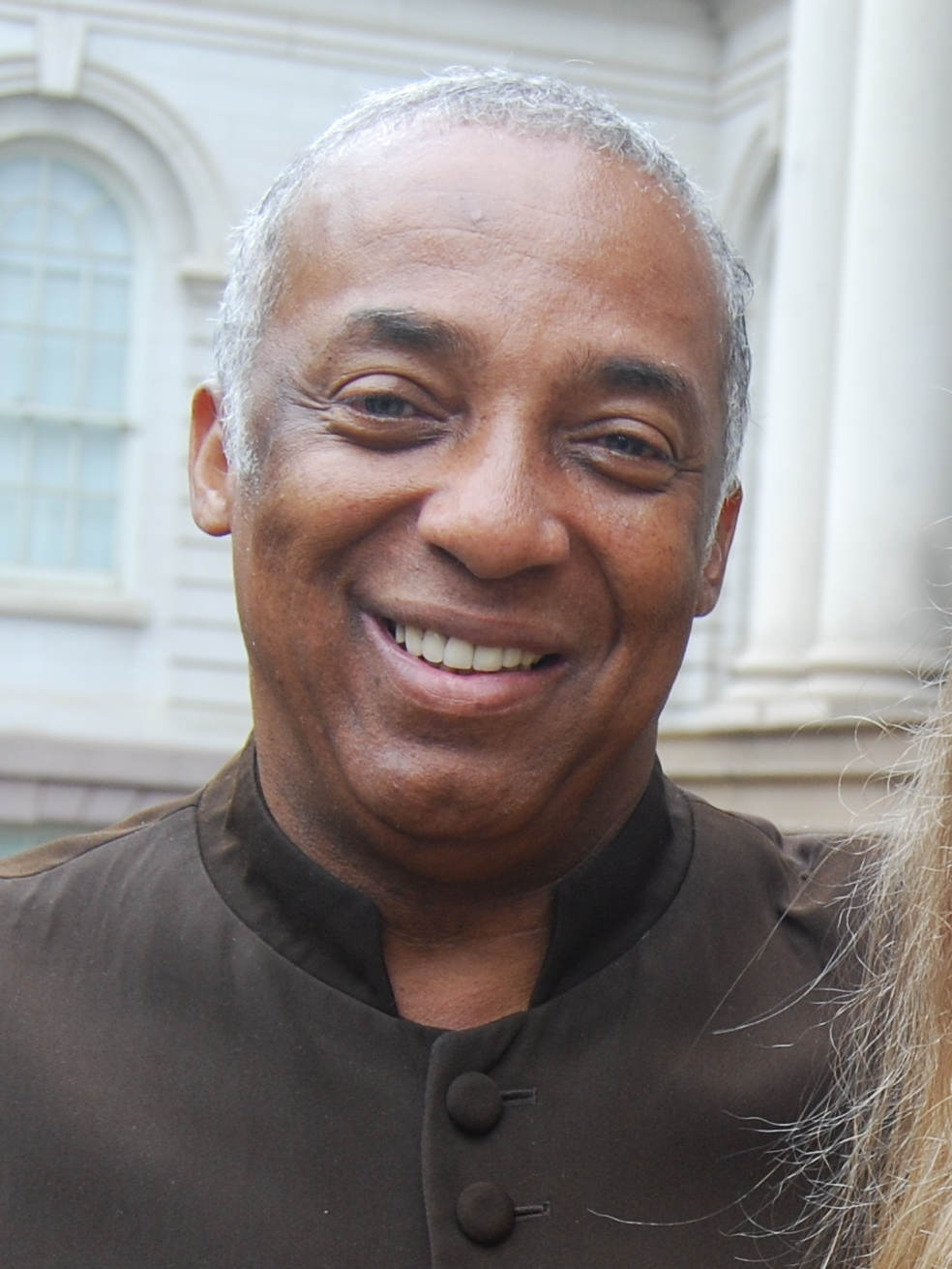
- Barron in 2008

Member of the New York City Council from the 42nd district
- In office January 1, 2022 – December 31, 2023
- Preceded by: Inez Barron
- Succeeded by: Chris Banks
- In office January 1, 2002 – December 31, 2013
- Preceded by: Priscilla A. Wooten
- Succeeded by: Inez Barron

Member of the New York State Assembly from the 60th district
- In office January 3, 2015 – January 1, 2021
- Preceded by: Inez Barron
- Succeeded by: Nikki Lucas

Personal details
- Born: October 7, 1950 (age 76) New York City, New York, U.S.
- Party: Democratic
- Other political affiliations: Black Panther (1968–1982); Freedom Party of New York (2010–present)
- Spouse: Inez Smith
- Children: 2
- Education: New York City College of Technology; Hunter College (BA)

Charles Barron (born October 7, 1950) is an American activist and politician who served in the New York City Council, representing Brooklyn's 42nd district from 2022 to 2023. He previously held the same seat from 2002 to 2013, and served in the New York Assembly from the 60th district between 2015 and 2022.

A self-described "elected activist", Barron ran for Mayor of New York City in 2005. In 2006 he was narrowly defeated by Edolphus Towns in the Democratic Party primary for the U.S. House of Representatives (10th Congressional District). He ran again in the Democratic primary for New York's 8th congressional district, which was being vacated by Towns, but lost to State Assemblyman Hakeem Jeffries, 28% to 72%.

Barron began his career working as a community activist in the East New York neighborhood of Brooklyn in the 1980s. He became chief of staff for Rev. Herbert Daughtry before running for the New York city council, where he served from 2001 to 2013.

== Early years and education ==
Barron was born on October 7, 1950. For six years, his family lived in Corona, Queens, then moved to the Lillian Wald housing project in Lower Manhattan. He attended Seward Park High School in Lower Manhattan, but left before graduating, and later earned his GED. He went on to attend New York City Technical College (then known as New York City Community College), earning an associate degree, and Hunter College, where he graduated with a B.A. in Sociology.

== Early activism ==
=== Black Panther Party ===
In 1969, when he was 18 years old, Barron was recruited to the Harlem branch of the Black Panther Party by a member named Mark Holder. Barron distributed newspapers for the party and developed an interest in politics. He studied the Third World independence movement and the ideas of African leaders, such as Kwame Nkrumah (president of Ghana) and Ahmed Sékou Touré (president of Guinea). Barron became increasingly critical of U.S. foreign policy. He opposed the Duvaliers in Haiti, Pinochet in Chile, Marcos in the Philippines, Pahlavi of Iran, and Somoza of Nicaragua. He recalled in 2010, "It was strange, because everybody I was against, America was for."

... I still say I'm a Black Panther to my heart because in the 10-Point Program we talked about an immediate end to police brutality and exemption from us going into the military because we're not going to fight against countries and people of color abroad when we don't even have our freedom domestically and we fought for housing and clothing, shelter and relevant education, and this was all part of the 10-Point Program of the Black Panther Party which is still what I'm fighting for today.

— Charles Barron during an interview in 2010

=== National Black United Front ===
In 1979, Barron joined the National Black United Front (NBUF) and was the founding chairperson of its Harlem Chapter. In 1982, as head of the Harlem Chapter, Barron was arrested with Preston Wilcox from the Institute of African Research because they, with roughly 12 to 20 other protesters, attempted to "forcibly remove" Robert Morris, a white historian, from the Schomburg Center for Research in Black Culture. Morris had been appointed chief archivist of the center. The members of the group were charged with harassment and criminal trespassing.

Shortly after the incident, Barron was appointed chief of staff to the Reverend Herbert Daughtry, chairperson of the NBUF and minister at Brooklyn's House of the Lord Church. In 1983, Barron moved to East New York, where he and his wife founded the Dynamics of Leadership Company. He spoke at many organizations and schools, including Harvard and Yale, teaching principles of negotiation, team-building, emotional intelligence, and leadership. From 1982 to 1987, Barron served as secretary general of the African Peoples Christian Organization (APCO). He traveled across the United States visiting college campuses, churches, prisons, and communities "organizing around international, national and local issues."

On December 21, 1987, Barron participated in a "day of outrage" to protest racism in the New York City Police Department and local courts. The protest involved blocking traffic during the evening rush hour, including eastbound traffic on the Brooklyn Bridge, as well as stopping subway trains in several stations. More than 70 protesters were arrested; most were charged with obstruction of government administration and disorderly conduct. Among the few who actually stood on the subway tracks included Barron, Rev. Al Sharpton, Rev. Benjamin Chavis, Rev. Timothy Mitchell, Assemblyman Roger Greene, and lawyer C. Vernon Mason, who was additionally charged with criminal trespass. All were held overnight in jail, which elicited further claims of racial bias. Sharpton, Mitchell, and Barron were convicted in February 1990, with Mitchell and Barron being jailed for 45 days. Barron spent another 25 days in jail, with Sharpton, for a protest related to the Tawana Brawley rape allegations.

In 1988, Barron published two children's books: Up You Mighty People, You Can Accomplish What You Will and Look For Me in the Whirlwind, written about the life of Marcus Garvey.

One successful accomplishment of Barron and his allies was preventing the construction by the city of a wood-burning incinerator in the neighborhood. In 1996, Barron and community groups also fought the building of a natural gas generator. Barron said his opposition to the incinerator is what catapulted him into electoral politics.

== City Council ==
In 1997, Barron ran for the city council. He attacked the incumbent, East New York councilmember Priscilla Wooten, for supporting Mayor Rudy Giuliani, saying her politics were out of date and she did not take enough initiative for neighborhood and community development. Barron was endorsed by black leaders David Dinkins and Al Sharpton, but he ended up losing to Wooten. Barron ran again in 2001, when term limits prevented Wooten from running. He defeated her son, Donald Wooten, and became City Councillor for the 42nd District. Barron was re-elected in 2005 and 2009, each time with over 85% of the popular vote.

In 2002, Barron was appointed chair of the city council's Higher Education Committee. As chair, he criticized the City University of New York (CUNY) for eliminating remedial courses and raising admission standards, claiming CUNY raised the standards in order to restrict minority student access. He argued that students should not be denied admission to CUNY because of their performance at the pre-college level, adding that when the CUNY ended open admissions the number of black students declined while changes in the proportions of other ethnic groups were minimal.

In January 2006, Barron was the only Council member to vote against Christine Quinn by voting for Bill de Blasio for the speakership position. Quinn moved his seat in the chamber to one next to a statue of the third President of the United States, Thomas Jefferson, whom Barron has criticized. Barron told reporters, "I don't think it was deliberate, but it does bother me to be placed so near Jefferson, who was a slaveholder, a hypocrite, and a rapist."

In late 2009, Barron intensified his opposition to Quinn, proposing a "Democratic Reform Movement" with City Councillor Tony Avella to shift power away from the council speaker to rank-and-file members. Barron and Avella proposed electing a black or Latino member as speaker to replace Quinn. Barron challenged Quinn for the speakership but was defeated by a council vote of 48 to 1. Quinn then organized a 47–1 vote removing Barron as chairman of the Higher Education Committee. Barron stated that the move to strip him of the committee chairmanship was racist. Quinn disagreed, stating that the Council needed chairpersons "that are unifying forces." In January 2010, Barron ran against Quinn for the position of Speaker and lost 50–1. During the vote, his supporters shouted "sellout" and "Uncle Tom" to black members who voted for Quinn.

== 2005 New York City mayoral campaign ==
Barron entered the race for mayor of New York City in 2005. According to the New York Post, he stated that one of his reasons for running was to redress an unfair balance of power between Whites and blacks in New York City: "White men have too much power in this city". He raised funds and campaigned, but in early February 2005, dropped out and threw his support to C. Virginia Fields. His campaign funding amounted to about $49,000, far less than that of some of the other Democratic candidates; Fernando Ferrer raised $1.2 million in six months, and Gifford Miller raised $1 million in 6 months. Barron chose to endorse Fields rather than attempt a long-shot campaign. "I think two blacks in the race cancel each other out", he said, indicating a fear that the black vote would be divided and weakened by the choice of two candidates. Barron vowed that he would run again, saying "I will be back. I will be mayor of New York City before I leave this planet. It may be in 2009 or it may not be until 2013, but I will be mayor someday."

During the campaign, he criticized rival Democrat Fernando Ferrer for the latter's comments regarding the Amadou Diallo shooting. Barron said the comments brought "irreversible" damage to Ferrer's campaign and hoped Ferrer would drop out of the race and endorse Fields.

In 2006, Barron expressed his disaffection from the Democratic Party, disappointed by the large number of cross-endorsements Bloomberg received from Democrats. He said the Party needed a "political audit" and had "moved so far to the right that they might as well be called Republicrats." He told the Amsterdam News, "Black folks need to consider a mass exodus from the Democratic Party and build a new party of their own, because the Democrats have turned their backs on them on too many occasions. We should not give any party blind loyalty and support. Instead, we should really form a grassroots, Black-agenda-based third-party option."

== 2006 Congressional campaigns ==
In 2006, Barron ran for a House seat representing the 10th district, which includes East New York. He ran against the 24-year incumbent, Democrat Edolphus Towns, and lost by 8 points. Although considered a potentially strong contender in the 2008 Congressional election, he chose not to run.

== 2010 gubernatorial campaign ==
On June 14, 2010, Barron announced he had formed a new party, the New York Democratic Freedom Party, and would challenge Democratic gubernatorial nominee Andrew Cuomo. He noted that Cuomo had picked a white politician to run for the position of Lieutenant Governor and that all the other statewide Democratic Party candidates were white. When speaking about Cuomo, Barron said, "He's done nothing to deserve our support; he's hurt the black community. Remember he was with his father, when his father built more prisons than any other governor in the history of New York State. Andrew was with daddy and the apple doesn't fall far from the tree ... Andrew's arrogant, he's just like his father."

Barron expressed resentment towards the Democratic Party, saying it had taken African-Americans for granted: "It's time for us to be for us. It's time for us to be a self-determining people." Barron aimed to get 50,000 votes in the governor's race, enough to gain ballot access for the party, but ended up with 24,560 votes out of over 3,000,000 cast. More than 75% of the votes cast for Barron originated in New York City.

A month after Cuomo began his term as governor, on February 21, 2011, Barron interrupted a Cuomo speech in Brooklyn, leading the crowd in chants of "tax the rich". He criticized Cuomo's budget proposals, which called for deep cuts in health care and education spending, and his decision not to extend the state's so-called millionaire's tax, which expires at the end of 2012.

== 2012 Congressional campaign ==
Barron announced that he would seek the 2012 Democratic nomination for the House seat due to the retirement of the long-term incumbent, Edolphus Towns. By mid-June 2012, candidate Hakeem Jeffries had raised $700,000 in campaign donations compared to Barron's $50,000. Towns gave Barron a surprise endorsement, but Barron was publicly embarrassed when David Duke made a video where he endorsed Barron over Jeffries, stating that he liked Barron's anti-Israel views and making racial insults towards Jeffries. Barron tried to deflect Duke's unwelcome praise, but the news was widely circulated by Jeffries' supporters, who were amused that Barron couldn't really counter Duke's endorsement because they did share some common beliefs.

On June 11, 2012, former Mayor Ed Koch, Congressman Jerrold Nadler, Councilman David G. Greenfield, and Assemblyman Dov Hikind gathered with several other elected officials to support Jeffries and denounce Barron. Barron was described as anti-Semitic, and his support of Zimbabwe ruler Robert Mugabe and former Libya ruler Muammar Gaddafi was denounced. Greenfield described Barron as "a hate-monger and an anti-Semite." Barron responded that such attacks had not been raised when he spoke before Jewish groups in Brooklyn, and that his constituents were interested in discussing "bread and butter" issues, not foreign policy. The candidates differed strongly on charter schools. Barron is one of the charter schools' strongest critics, while Jeffries endorses them.

Barron lost the Democratic nomination to Jeffries, with Jeffries taking 72% for the vote to Barron's 28% on June 26, 2012. Barron refused to congratulate Jeffries, accusing the Jeffries campaign of "a smear campaign [and] show[ing] a lack of character". He added, "They had the media. They called us names — The New York Times, The Wall Street Journal, the New York Post, the white media — because we were endorsed by the Amsterdam News and Black Star. We had the Wall Street corporate elite, the Democratic establishment, and the media all against us. But we put the state and nation on notice." Jeffries stated in his own victory speech that "The political pundits said that this was going to be a close race, but that was before the people had spoken."

== 2014 State Assembly campaign ==
On November 4, 2013, Barron announced in a Web Video that he would run for the State Assembly seat, currently vacated by his wife, Inez, who ran for his term-limited City council seat. Barron said that he will fight Gov. Andrew Cuomo, Speaker Sheldon Silver, and the Democratic establishment to raise taxes and to increase Pre-K funding.

== Political positions ==
=== Education ===
On February 3, 2011, Barron was among hundreds of angry parents and students who protested loudly during a hearing closing 12 schools classified as failing. On March 3, Barron celebrated with supporters as they learned that one of their protests had been successful, and that PS 114 in Canarsie would remain open.

=== Walmart ===
On February 3, 2011, the city council discussed allowing a Walmart into Brooklyn, with East New York one of the neighborhoods being considered by Walmart. Barron called Walmart a "roving plantation" and said, "There are no slaves in East New York. We will not be your slave workers."

=== Same-sex marriage and civil unions ===
In November 2011, Barron said that he opposed same sex marriage, but at a June 2012 debate declined to state a position on the issue. Earlier in 2010, while running for governor, Barron stated that he was a strong supporter of civil unions, adding, "I voted positively on all legislation in the City Council regarding civil union and gay rights. I believe homosexuals deserve equal protection under the law, like everyone else."

When asked in 2011 about the argument that the fight for same-sex marriage is the modern-day equivalent of the civil rights struggle, Barron answered, "I don't consider it the civil-rights issue of our time. Comparing it to our struggle when we were stolen from Africa, enslaved, murdered, raped, hung, lynched. I'm not even going to give it the same breath as our movement in this country."

=== Israel and its blockade of Gaza ===
A leader of the Viva Palestina-USA group, Barron, in July 2009, joined 200 other participants, mostly U.S. citizens, as the George Galloway led Viva Palestina relief convoy penetrated the Israeli-Egyptian blockade of Gaza. The convoy brought more than $1 million in medical equipment and supplies to Gaza's one and a half million inhabitants. The U.S.-based Anti-Defamation League asked the U.S. Justice Department to investigate the U.S. Viva Palestina group, but the group stated that it would adhere to U.S. law and not provide Hamas assistance, instead delivering its aid to nongovernmental organizations.

In July 2009, Barron stated that the Gaza Strip section of the Palestinian Territories was "a virtual death camp, the same kind of conditions the Nazis imposed on the Jews." 11 months later, he stated, "There's too many children and women and innocent men of Gaza dying because you're isolating them and not allowing anything in. It's like having a concentration death camp. It's horrible, and the whole world is and should be outraged."

=== Muammar Gaddafi, Robert Mugabe, and Louis Farrakhan ===
In November 2011, after the end of the Libyan civil war, Barron voiced support for Libyan ruler Muammar Gaddafi, stating, "Out there, they don't know that Qaddafi was our brother." [Barron] also rejected claims of Gaddafi's brutality, stating "People say 'Didn't he kill all those people?' I say, 'I don't know anything. The man was a freedom fighter.'"

On September 12, 2002, Barron hosted an event at New York City Hall honoring Zimbabwe, the president Robert Mugabe, whom Barron praised as the liberator of black Africans in then-Rhodesia. In 2008, he again voiced support for Mugabe, who had allegedly committed crimes and atrocities in Zimbabwe. Specifically, Barron said, "In the year 2000, when he said one farm, one farmer, he was vilified", arguing that Mugabe was popular internationally only while his government "didn't take the land from the whites". He added that in South Africa, whites "still own 80 to 90 percent of the land," which is why international powers support South African leaders such as Nelson Mandela. Barron stated he had seen no evidence that tied the Mugabe government to any attacks on supporters of the Zimbabwe opposition.

Barron has defended Louis Farrakhan against allegations that Farrakhan is a racist.

=== Police brutality ===
Barron has sided with black leaders in supporting victims of police brutality, including Amadou Diallo. He has said that crime is not the fault of the black community, but rather, is a consequence of the community's economic plight. Barron said that crime could only be reduced by economic opportunities and advancement, and without economic opportunities, "every black community is a powder keg."

In response to the New York City Police Department (NYPD) shooting of three individuals—including the fatal shooting of a 23-year-old prospective bridegroom, Sean Bell outside of a Jamaica, Queens strip club in 2006, Barron made controversial statements, including one that implied that members of Bell's community would be justified in exercising non-peaceful or violent methods in response to his death. Barron has publicly stated, "we don't shoot anybody, they shoot us."

Barron's name was floated with death threats on NYPD Rant, an internet forum, in 2007. Barron and the 100 Blacks in Law Enforcement called for a prompt investigation, and a security detail was increased.

=== Reparations for slavery ===
Barron has spoken passionately on the issue of reparations for slavery and, while on the city council, proposed creating a commission in New York City to study the effects of slavery on modern African Americans and use city funding for reparations. He also introduced a bill to support restitution from companies that had benefited from past slavery.

In 2002, Barron was criticized for stating at a reparations rally, "I want to go up to the closest white person and say, 'You can't understand this, it's a black thing' and then slap him, just for my mental health." Barron explained that the remark was hyperbole and not to be taken seriously.

=== African-American history ===
Barron believes that United States history is not accurately taught in schools, and has expressed interest in promoting African-American history throughout the New York City public school system. He has drafted legislation mandating the teaching of African-American history in the required school curriculum. He has used his position as Councilman to propose renaming buildings and schools, as well as decorating them with mementos of black history. He wishes to publicize black history more, including erecting portraits of Martin Luther King Jr. and Malcolm X, as important leaders in American history. Barron proposed bills to honor America's African American heritage and such individuals as Malcolm X, Marcus Garvey, Frederick Douglass, Paul Robeson, and W. E. B. Du Bois. He drafted a bill that would have asked President George W. Bush to cancel all debts African nations owe the U.S.

=== Clemency and compensation for the wrongly accused ===
Barron has twice sought clemency for individuals he described as "political prisoners". For example, in 2002, he asked that Anthony Bottom, Albert Washington, and Herman Bell be released. Although they were convicted for killing two police officers in 1971, conflicting evidence surfaced through COINTELPRO that suggests questionable government tactics in the prosecution of the three men. The bill was hotly debated and rejected. Barron asked in 2005 that Assata Shakur, a fugitive wanted by the federal government, be granted clemency for the alleged 1973 killing of a state trooper.

In 2009, Barron asked that the City of New York compensate the five men wrongly accused in the Central Park Jogger case.

=== Immigration ===
Barron, appearing on the Fox network television program The O'Reilly Factor In April 2006, stated that opposition to present-day immigration involves skin color. He argued that Germans, Jews, Poles, Greeks, and Italians who immigrated to the United States during the late 19th century were welcomed because of the color of their skin. In contrast, "All of a sudden when the complexion of immigration changes, now it's 'these people'." He stated to host Bill O'Reilly that the original European immigrants had received preferential treatment: "They had enough black people here already that were skilled and couldn't get the jobs that your people [i.e., European-Americans] were able to get." Many viewers responded to the episode, upset that Barron did not concede that white immigrants were also discriminated against.

=== Pledge of Allegiance ===
Barron says he does not salute the flag or believe in the Pledge of Allegiance, stating that the pledge's assertion that there is equality and justice for all is a lie that is not true for African-Americans. In 2004, he strongly objected to a move by the City Council that would begin each meeting with a voluntary Pledge.

=== Capitalism ===
Barron has criticized crony capitalism, calling it a "deeply-rooted illness" within America. Barron wrote a scathing editorial on the $700 billion bailout package in 2008, calling it the "biggest welfare check in the history of the planet". He said it was "a contradiction of capitalism" to give money to Wall Street during a slump while it had said for years that there was "no money for the people." Barron believes that capitalism should be replaced with socialism.

=== Gentrification ===
At the National Summit on Gentrification in 2019, Barron discussed strategies for keeping his district Black to the exclusion of White people, boasting:

"East New York, the community has had the largest increase in the black population is in East New York 13.2%. Harlem lost 14% of its blacks, 400% increase of whites ... I have the distinct honor to be able to come before you and say I actually lost white population in my community. I lost, They left. I didn't ask them why they left. So if you see one or two or three or four or five whites in my neighborhood they're passing through."

=== Subprime mortgage crisis ===
Barron held a mortgage crisis forum in 2007 to address concerns from residents who were in danger of house foreclosure. Barron said the subprime mortgage crisis of 2007 predominantly hurt African-Americans, who were lied to by predatory business practices.

== See also ==
- New York City Council
- Land reform in Zimbabwe

Political offices
Preceded by Priscilla A. Wooten	Member of the New York City Council from the 42nd district 2002–2013	Succeeded by Inez Barron
Preceded by Inez Barron	Member of the New York City Council from the 42nd district 2022–2024	Succeeded by Chris Banks
New York State Assembly
Preceded by Inez Barron	Member of the New York Assembly from the 60th district 2015–2021	Succeeded by Nikki Lucas
