= Nikki Lucas =

American politician (born 1970)

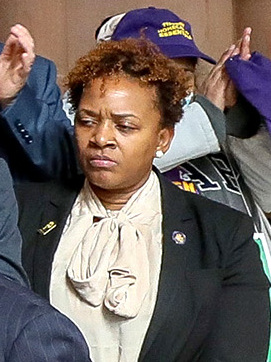
- Lucas in 2022

Member of the New York State Assembly from the 60th district
- Incumbent
- Assumed office February 17, 2022
- Preceded by: Charles Barron

Personal details
- Born: June 20, 1970 (age 56)
- Party: Democratic
- Education: Borough of Manhattan Community College (AA); Syracuse University (BA)
- Website: State Assembly website

Nikki I. Lucas (born June 20, 1970) is an American politician, activist, and consultant serving as a member of the New York State Assembly from the 60th district. She assumed office on February 17, 2022.

== Early life and career ==
Lucas has resided in Starrett City, Brooklyn, since moving to the housing complex with her parents in 1978. Her paternal grandmother was Panamanian. She earned an Associate of Arts degree in liberal arts from the Borough of Manhattan Community College and a Bachelor of Arts degree in policy studies and conflict resolution from Syracuse University.

Outside of politics, Lucas has worked as an independent consultant in the medical field. She also previously owned music store 'Nikko's in The Mix' in East New York, Brooklyn, and was a recruiter for the United States Census Bureau.

== Political career ==
In 2013, Lucas first ran for the New York City Council's 42nd district after incumbent Charles Barron retired. She placed fifth in the Democratic primary election with 6.6% of the vote. She filed to run for the district again in 2017 but ultimately terminated her campaign committee and did not appear on the ballot.

Lucas ran for the New York City Council in 2021, losing to Barron with 46.3% of the vote. Following his election back on to the New York City Council, Lucas was elected to the New York State Assembly to fill his seat in a February 2022 special election.

In July 2026, Lucas was sued by an attorney over more than $6,000 in legal services provided during her 2021 council campaign. A hearing was originally scheduled for September 2026, but was rescheduled to February 2027 after she failed to appear. Separately, a president of a political consulting firm alleged that Lucas owed him around $2,000 for voter mobilization services also from the 2021 campaign, although he did not intend to sue. A spokesperson for Lucas described the invoices as "disputed" and said they "are under review."

On October 4, 2026, Lucas was voted chair of the Brooklyn Democratic Party by Rodneyse Bichotte Hermelyn and several allies despite a temporary restraining order blocking the party from any votes on a new chair. A day later, the party announced Lucas as its new chair. Lawyers for the reform faction of the party filed to pursue contempt of court charges against all participants in the vote.
