= Eric N. Vitaliano =

American judge and politician (born 1948)

Eric Nicholas Vitaliano
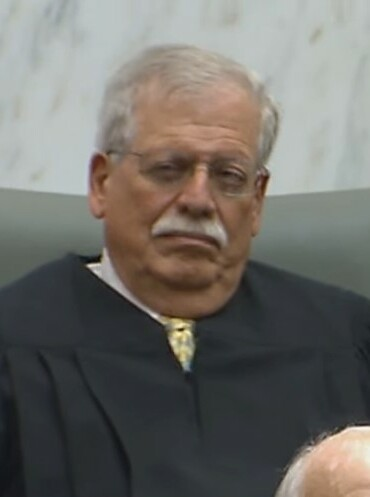
- Vitaliano in 2017

Senior Judge of the United States District Court for the Eastern District of New York
- Incumbent
- Assumed office February 28, 2017

Judge of the United States District Court for the Eastern District of New York
- In office January 19, 2006 – February 28, 2017
- Appointed by: George W. Bush
- Preceded by: Arthur Spatt
- Succeeded by: Eric R. Komitee

Member of the New York State Assembly from the 59th district
- In office January 1, 1983 – December 31, 1992
- Preceded by: Victor L. Robles
- Succeeded by: Elizabeth Connelly

Member of the New York State Assembly from the 60th district
- In office January 1, 1993 – December 31, 2001
- Preceded by: Robert A. Straniere
- Succeeded by: Matthew Mirones

Personal details
- Born: Eric Nicholas Vitaliano; 1948 (age 77–78) Staten Island, New York, U.S.
- Party: Democratic
- Education: Fordham University (BA); New York University (JD)

Eric Nicholas Vitaliano (born 1948) is an American judge and politician. He was a member of the New York State Assembly and is a senior United States district judge of the United States District Court for the Eastern District of New York. Vitaliano was nominated by President George W. Bush on October 6, 2005, to a seat vacated by Arthur Spatt. He was confirmed by the United States Senate on December 21, 2005, and received commission on January 19, 2006.

== Early life ==
Vitaliano was born in West New Brighton, Staten Island in 1948. He attended St. Peter's Boys High School. While at college he became a member of the Bronx Young Democrats of America.

Vitaliano received a Bachelor of Arts from Fordham College in 1968, followed by a Juris Doctor from the New York University School of Law in 1971.

== Career ==
After law school, Vitaliano clerked for United States District Judge Mark A. Constantino of the Eastern District of New York, and worked for seven years for the Manhattan law firm of Simpson Thacher & Bartlett. From 1979 to 1981 he served as Chief of Staff to Congressman John M. Murphy.

He was a member of the New York State Assembly from 1983 to 2001, sitting in the 185th, 186th, 187th, 188th, 189th, 190th, 191st, 192nd, 193rd and 194th New York State Legislatures. In a 1997 special election, he ran for Congress in 13th District, but was defeated by Republican Vito Fossella. In November 2001, Vitaliano was elected to the New York City Civil Court.

=== New York State assembly ===
As a member of the New York State Assembly, Vitaliano supported many political causes throughout his career. He supported the closure of the Fresh Kills Landfill and lobbied for the order of consent from the New York State Department of Environmental Conservation that was required to begin the closure process. In 1996, he shaped the bill whose successful passage of legislation eventually enabled the landfill to close in 2001. In addition to this, Vitaliano also served as the senior New York City member of the Legislative Commission on Solid Waste Management and served as vice-chairman of the Joint Legislative Commission on Toxic Substances and Hazardous Wastes.

Vitaliano was also supported an increase of public transportation on Staten Island. He frequently lobbied to ensure satisfactory express bus service from the Metropolitan Transportation Authority from the Island to New York City. He also supported the one-way toll for the Verrazzano–Narrows Bridge, which eventually was enacted on a federal level.

=== Run for Congress ===
In 1997, after fourteen years in the State Assembly, Vitaliano decided to run for Congress. A climax of his campaign was the day President Bill Clinton came to Staten Island in support of his candidacy. His attempt was unsuccessful and he lost to his Republican opponent, New York City Councilman Vito Fossella.

=== Federal judicial service ===
In 2005, he was recommended to the Eastern District bench by Senator Charles Schumer. Vitaliano was officially nominated to the court by President George W. Bush on October 6, 2005, to the seat vacated by Arthur Donald Spatt, confirmed by the United States Senate on December 21, 2005, and received his commission on January 19, 2006. He assumed senior status on February 28, 2017.

=== Notable case ===
In July 2011, wide attention came to his injunction that essentially nullified a set of decisions by the federal, state and city governments over the last years, which had removed two historic buildings from classification as federally designated parkland. One, the Tobacco Warehouse, a Civil War-era structure in Dumbo, was on the verge of conversion to the new home of Brooklyn's leading theater company. Judge Vitaliano held it was “crystal clear” that the National Park Service and others had exceeded their authority.

== Personal life ==
Vitaliano has glaucoma and is legally blind.

New York State Assembly
Preceded by Victor L. Robles	Member of the New York State Assembly from the 59th district 1983–1992	Succeeded by Elizabeth Connelly
Preceded by Robert A. Straniere	Member of the New York State Assembly from the 60th district 1993–2001	Succeeded by Matthew Mirones
Legal offices
Preceded by Arthur Spatt	Judge of the United States District Court for the Eastern District of New York; 2006–2017	Succeeded by Eric R. Komitee
