= Matthew Mirones =

American politician

Member of the New York State Assembly from the 60th district
- In office February 2002 – December 31, 2006
- Preceded by: Eric Nicholas Vitaliano
- Succeeded by: Janele Hyer-Spencer

Personal details
- Born: April 24, 1956 (age 70) Brooklyn, New York, U.S.
- Party: Republican
- Education: New York University
- Profession: Politician Prosthetist, Orthotist

Matthew Mirones (born April 24, 1956) is a former Republican politician from New York City who represented parts of Brooklyn and Staten Island in the New York State Assembly.

== Education and background ==
Mirones is the son of immigrants from the island of Chios in Greece. His father was a shoemaker. Mirones is Greek-American and lived in Bay Ridge, Brooklyn before relocating to the Grasmere section of Staten Island, both of which were located within his Assembly district.

Mirones received a B.S. in Prosthetics and Orthotics from New York University Medical School.

== Political career ==
Mirones was elected in a special election on February 12, 2002, to fill the seat that was vacated by Democrat Eric Nicholas Vitaliano, who went on to become a civil court judge. His Democratic opponent was local plumber and union leader James Hart.

Mirones represented the 60th District of the New York State Assembly, which included mostly the Mid-Island area of Staten Island and later Staten Island's East Shore and Brooklyn's Bay Ridge sections after redistricting. In the Assembly, he sat on the Oversight Committee, the Analysis and Investigation Committee, the Health and Aging Committees and the Corporations, Authorities, and Commissions Committee. He was appointed to serve as the ranking member of the Assembly Mental Health Committee, and also sat on the Transportation, and Cities committees. He was also a member of the state Assembly Legislative Task Force for People with Disabilities. He is a member of the Brooklyn and Staten Island Chambers of Commerce, and serves as a trustee of the Staten Island Institute of Arts & Sciences, and was formerly the president of the Grasmere Civic Association.

Mirones retired in 2006 from the New York State Assembly.

In 2008, Mirones was viewed as a potential Congressional candidate for New York's 13th Congressional district (map) which was being vacated by Vito J. Fossella.

== Private sector career ==
Mirones owns ARIMED Orthotics and Prosthetics, a medical supply company with his brother Steven Mirones. Based in New York City with offices in Manhattan, Brooklyn, Staten Island and the Bronx, Arimed features American Board Certified orthotists, prosthetists and pedorthists, professional orthopedic fitters and technicians, and an on-site laboratory and technical staff, which enable the firm to quickly and effectively create and fine-tune patient care devices.

New York State Assembly
Preceded by Eric Nicholas Vitaliano	New York State Assembly, 60th District; 2002–2006	Succeeded by Janele Hyer-Spencer
