= New York City's 42nd City Council district =

- Boundaries following the 2020 census

Government
  - Councilmember: . Chris Banks. D–East New York

Population (2010)
  - Total: 165,150

Demographics
  - Black: 73%
  - Hispanic: 19%
  - White: 4%
  - Asian: 2%
  - Other: 2%

Registration
  - Democratic: 79.9%
  - Republican: 3.6%
  - No party preference: 14.2%
- Registered voters (2021) 109,090

New York City's 42nd City Council district is one of 51 districts in the New York City Council. It has been represented by Democrat Chris Banks since 2024, succeeding Charles Barron who lost in the Democratic Primary.

== Geography ==
District 42 is based in the easternmost neighborhoods of Brooklyn, covering most of East New York (including its New Lots, Spring Creek, and Starrett City subsections) and part of East Flatbush. Shirley Chisholm State Park is also located within the district, as are many of Jamaica Bay Wildlife Refuge's western islands.

The district overlaps with Brooklyn Community Boards 5, 16, 17, and 18, and with New York's 8th and 9th congressional districts. It also overlaps with the 18th, 19th, 20th, and 21st districts of the New York State Senate, and with the 54th, 55th, 58th, and 60th districts of the New York State Assembly.

== Members representing the district ==
Members	Party	Years served	Electoral history
District established January 1, 1992
Priscilla A. Wooten (East New York)	Democratic	January 1, 1992 – December 31, 2001	Redistricted from the 24th district and re-elected in 1991. Re-elected in 1993. Re-elected in 1997. Termed out.
Charles Barron (East New York)	Democratic	January 1, 2002 – December 31, 2013	Elected in 2001. Re-elected in 2003. Re-elected in 2005. Re-elected in 2009. Retired to run for U.S. House of Representatives.
Inez Barron (East New York)	Democratic	January 1, 2014 – December 31, 2021	Elected in 2013. Re-elected in 2017. Termed out.
Charles Barron (East New York)	Democratic	January 1, 2022 – December 31, 2023	Elected in 2021. Lost renomination.
Chris Banks (East New York)	Democratic	January 1, 2024 –	Elected in 2023. Re-elected in 2025.

== Recent election results ==
=== 2025 ===
2025 New York City Council election, District 42
Party	Candidate	Votes	%
Democratic	Chris Banks (incumbent)	23,336	95.5
Freedom	Davon Phillips	1,045	4.3
Write-in		45	0.2
Total votes		24,426	100.0
Democratic hold			

=== 2023 (redistricting) ===
Due to redistricting and the 2020 changes to the New York City Charter, councilmembers elected during the 2021 and 2023 City Council elections will serve two-year terms, with full four-year terms resuming after the 2025 New York City Council elections.

2023 New York City Council election, District 42
Primary election
Party	Candidate	Votes	%
Democratic	Chris Banks	3,134	50.7
Democratic	Charles Barron (incumbent)	2,633	42.6
Democratic	Jamilah Rose	356	5.8
Write-in		54	0.9
Total votes		6,177	100
General election
Democratic	Chris Banks	6,753	97.3
Write-in		185	2.7
Total votes		6,938	100
Democratic hold			

=== 2021 ===
In 2019, voters in New York City approved Ballot Question 1, which implemented ranked-choice voting in all local elections. Under the new system, voters have the option to rank up to five candidates for every local office. Voters whose first-choice candidates fare poorly will have their votes redistributed to other candidates in their ranking until one candidate surpasses the 50 percent threshold. If one candidate surpasses 50 percent in first-choice votes, then ranked-choice tabulations will not occur.

2021 New York City Council election, District 42 Democratic primary
Party	Candidate	Maximum round	Maximum votes	Share in maximum round	Maximum votes First round votes Transfer votes
Democratic	Charles Barron	3	7,979	53.7%	
Democratic	Nikki Lucas	3	6,868	46.3%	
Democratic	Wilfredo Florentino	2	1,591	10.2%	
Democratic	Gena Watson	2	788	5.1%	
Write-in		1	124	0.8%	

An interactive map of District 42

2021 New York City Council election, District 42 general election
Party	Candidate	Votes	%
Democratic	Charles Barron	15,380	98.6
Write-in		211	1.4
Total votes		15,591	100
Democratic hold			

=== 2017 ===
2017 New York City Council election, District 42
Primary election
Party	Candidate	Votes	%
Democratic	Inez Barron (incumbent)	7,475	83.5
Democratic	Mawuli Hormeku	1,450	16.2
Write-in		27	0.3
Total votes		8,952	100
General election
Democratic	Inez Barron (incumbent)	18,341	92.5
Conservative	Ernest Johnson	893	4.5
Reform	Mawuli Hormeku	556	2.8
Write-in		26	0.1
Total votes		19,816	100
Democratic hold			

=== 2013 ===
2013 New York City Council election, District 42
Primary election
Party	Candidate	Votes	%
Democratic	Inez Barron	5,887	43.2
Democratic	Chris Banks	3,359	24.7
Democratic	Regina Powell	1,178	8.7
Democratic	John Whitehead	1,037	7.6
Democratic	Nikki Lucas	908	6.7
Democratic	Sean Henry	813	6.0
Democratic	Prince Lewis	431	3.2
Write-in		2	0.0
Total votes		13,615	100
General election
Democratic	Inez Barron	17,764	
Working Families	Inez Barron	390	
Total	Inez Barron	18,154	96.0
Conservative	Ernest Johnson	723	3.8
Write-in		25	0.1
Total votes		18,902	100
Democratic hold			
