= Inez Barron =

American educator

Member of the New York City Council from the 42nd district
- In office January 1, 2014 – December 31, 2021
- Preceded by: Charles Barron
- Succeeded by: Charles Barron

Member of the New York State Assembly
- In office January 1, 2009 – December 31, 2013
- Preceded by: Diane Gordon
- Succeeded by: Charles Barron
- Constituency: 40th district (2009–2012); 60th district (2013)

Personal details
- Born: Inez Smith; February 16, 1946 (age 80) Fort Greene, Brooklyn, New York
- Party: Democratic
- Spouse: Charles Barron
- Children: 2
- Education: City University of New York (B.S.); Bank Street College of Education (M.S.)
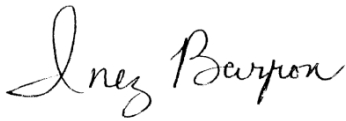
- Signature
- Website: "District 42". Archived from the original on 2021-08-28.

Inez Barron (née Smith) (born February 16, 1946) is an American educator and politician who served in the New York City Council for the 42nd district from 2014 to 2021. She is a Democrat. The district includes Broad Channel, Brownsville, Canarsie, East Flatbush, East New York, Howard Beach and Jamaica Bay in Brooklyn. Formerly, she served as the state Assemblywoman for New York's 60th district.

== Life and career ==
Born in Fort Greene, Brooklyn, Barron has been a community activist and a longtime educator since the 1960s. She is a graduate of Hunter College of the City University of New York with a Bachelor of Science in Physiology and Bank Street College of Education with a Master of Science in Reading and Special Education. Barron was a teacher for more than 36 years with New York Public Schools.

After assemblywoman Diane Gordon was charged with several scandals and eventually vacated the seat, Barron won the November 2008 election and became the State assemblywoman for the 40th district.

Like her husband, Charles Barron, she is known for her polarizing views and colorful remarks.

== New York City Council ==
Due to term limits, Charles Barron could not run for re-election to the New York City Council in 2013; Inez Barron ran instead and won. He did, however, run for her vacant Assembly seat, which he later won.

Barron resigned her seat in the Assembly to join the Council on January 1, 2014.

Election history
Location	Year	Election	Results
NY Assembly District 40	2008	Democratic Primary	√ Inez Barron 41.58% Earl L. Williams 19.35% Winchester Key 16.68% Kenneth Evans 11.68% Nathan Bradley 10.71%
NY Assembly District 40	2008	General	√ Inez Barron (D) 96.61% Kenneth Waluyn (R) 3.39%
NY Assembly District 40	2010	Democratic Primary	√ Inez Barron 74.41% Kenneth Evans 25.59%
NY Assembly District 40	2010	General	√ Inez Barron (D) 93.59% Kenneth Waluyn (R) 6.38%
NY Assembly District 60	2012	Democratic Primary	√ Inez Barron 55.46% Christopher Banks 44.26%
NY Assembly District 60	2012	General	√ Inez Barron (D) 96.65; Kenneth Waluyn (R) 3.30%
NYC Council District 42	2013	Democratic Primary	√ Inez Barron 43.25% Christopher Banks 24.68% Regina Powell 8.65% John C. Whitehead 7.62% Nikki Lucas 6.67% Sean K. Henry 5.97% Prince Lewis 3.17%
NYC Council District 42	2013	General	√ Inez Barron (D) 96.04% Ernest Johnson (Conservative) 3.83%
NYC Council District 42	2017	Democratic Primary	√ Inez Barron 83.50% Mawuli Hormeku 16.20% Write-in votes 0.3%
NYC Council District 42	2017	General	√ Inez Barron (D) 92.55% Ernest Johnson (Conservative) 4.51% Mawuli Hormeku (Reform) 2.81% Write-in votes 0.14%

Political offices
Preceded by Charles Barron	New York City Council, 42nd district 2014–2021	Succeeded by Charles Barron
New York State Assembly
Preceded by Diane Gordon	New York Assembly, 60th district 2013	Succeeded by Charles Barron
Preceded by Vacant	New York Assembly, 40th district 2009-2012	Succeeded by Ron Kim
