= New York's 62nd State Assembly district =

American legislative district

Assemblymember
Michael Reilly; R–Eltingville

New York's 62nd State Assembly district is one of the 150 districts in the New York State Assembly. It has been represented by Republican Michael Reilly since 2019.

== Geography ==
=== 2020s ===
District 62 is in southern Staten Island, and is the southernmost district in the state. It represents neighborhoods within the South Shore and Mid Island, such as Annadale, Arden Heights, Charleston, Eltingville, Huguenot, Prince's Bay, Richmond Valley, Rossville, Tottenville and Woodrow.

The district is overlapped by New York's 11th congressional district, the 24th district of the New York State Senate and the 50th and 51st districts of the New York City Council.

=== 2000s-2010s ===
District 62 is in southern Staten Island, and is the southernmost district in the state. It represents neighborhoods within the South Shore and Mid Island, such as Annadale, Arden Heights, Charleston, Eltingville, Huguenot, Prince's Bay, Richmond Valley, Rossville, Tottenville and Woodrow. Most of what was the Fresh Kills Landfill/Freshkills Park was located within this district.

=== 1992-2002 ===
District 62 was located in Manhattan, comprising Chinatown, the Financial District, and portions of the Lower East Side and the East Village.

== Recent election results ==
=== 2026 ===
2026 New York State Assembly election, District 62
Party	Candidate	Votes	%
Republican	Michael Reilly		
Conservative	Michael Reilly		
Total	Michael Reilly (incumbent)		
Write-in			
Total votes			100.0

=== 2024 ===
2024 New York State Assembly election, District 62
Party	Candidate	Votes	%
Republican	Michael Reilly	53,553	
Conservative	Michael Reilly	4,856	
Total	Michael Reilly (incumbent)	58,409	98.8
Write-in		696	1.2
Total votes		59,105	100.0
Republican hold			

=== 2022 ===
2022 New York State Assembly election, District 62
Party	Candidate	Votes	%
Republican	Michael Reilly	39,172	
Conservative	Michael Reilly	3,098	
Total	Michael Reilly (incumbent)	42,270	99.1
Write-in		403	0.9
Total votes		42,673	100.0
Republican hold			

=== 2020 ===
2020 New York State Assembly election, District 62
Party	Candidate	Votes	%
Republican	Michael Reilly	50,712	
Conservative	Michael Reilly	5,241	
Total	Michael Reilly (incumbent)	55,953	99.2
Write-in		477	0.8
Total votes		56,430	100.0
Republican hold			

=== 2018 ===
2018 New York State Assembly election, District 64
Primary election
Party	Candidate	Votes	%
Republican	Michael Reilly	3,374	64.3
Republican	Glenn Yost	1,372	26.1
Republican	Ashley Zanatta	463	8.8
Write-in		41	0.8
Total votes		5,250	100.0
Reform	Glenn Yost	134	38.8
Reform	Ashley Zanatta	129	37.4
Reform	Michael Reilly (write-in)	73	21.2
Write-in		9	2.6
Total votes		345	100.0
Conservative	Michael Reilly (write-in)	59	50.0
Conservative	Glenn Yost (write-in)	52	44.1
Conservative	Ashley Zanatta (write-in)	5	4.2
Conservative	Michael Ryan (write-in)	2	1.7
Write-in		0	0.0
Total votes		118	100.0
General election
Republican	Michael Reilly	28,533	
Conservative	Michael Reilly	2,949	
Total	Michael Reilly	31,482	89.3
Reform	Glenn Yost	3,484	9.9
Write-in		285	0.8
Total votes		35,251	100.0
Republican hold			

=== 2016 ===
2016 New York State Assembly election, District 64
Primary election
Party	Candidate	Votes	%
Republican	Ronald Castorina (incumbent)	2,365	67.3
Republican	Janine Materna	1,140	32.5
Write-in		7	0.2
Total votes		3,512	100.0
General election
Republican	Ronald Castorina	37,683	
Conservative	Ronald Castorina	3,764	
Independence	Ronald Castorina	2,593	
Reform	Ronald Castorina	411	
Total	Ronald Castorina (incumbent)	44,451	99.2
Write-in		315	0.8
Total votes		44,766	100.0
Republican hold			

=== 2016 special ===
Incumbent Joe Borelli resigned on November 30, 2015 after winning a municipal special election to the New York City Council, triggering a special election. In special elections for state legislative offices, primaries are usually not held - county committee members for each party select nominees.

2016 New York State Assembly special election, District 62
Party	Candidate	Votes	%
Republican	Ronald Castorina	10,409	
Independence	Ronald Castorina	1,502	
Conservative	Ronald Castorina	1,423	
Reform	Ronald Castorina	226	
Total	Ronald Castorina	13,560	97.9
Write-in		286	2.1
Total votes		13,846	100.0
Republican hold			

=== 2014 ===
2014 New York State Assembly election, District 62
Party	Candidate	Votes	%
Republican	Joe Borelli	15,914	
Conservative	Joe Borelli	2,406	
Independence	Joe Borelli	1,608	
Total	Joe Borelli (incumbent)	19,928	99.1
Write-in		172	0.9
Total votes		20,100	100.0
Republican hold			

=== 2012 ===
2012 New York State Assembly election, District 62
Party	Candidate	Votes	%
Republican	Joe Borelli	25,279	
Conservative	Joe Borelli	2,873	
Independence	Joe Borelli	874	
Total	Joe Borelli	29,026	69.1
Democratic	Anthony Mascolo	12,943	30.8
Write-in		37	0.1
Total votes		42,006	100.0
Republican hold			

=== 2010 ===
2010 New York State Assembly election, District 62
Party	Candidate	Votes	%
Republican	Louis Tobacco	19,020	
Conservative	Louis Tobacco	2,702	
Independence	Louis Tobacco	1,134	
Total	Louis Tobacco (incumbent)	22,856	78.6
Democratic	Albert Albanese	6,179	21.2
Write-in		48	0.2
Total votes		29,083	100.0
Republican hold			

=== 2008 ===
2008 New York State Assembly election, District 62
Party	Candidate	Votes	%
Republican	Louis Tobacco	26,975	
Conservative	Louis Tobacco	1,906	
Independence	Louis Tobacco	1,529	
Total	Louis Tobacco (incumbent)	30,410	72.0
Democratic	Albert Albanese	11,816	28.0
Write-in		6	0.0
Total votes		42,232	100.0
Republican hold			

=== 2007 special ===
Incumbent Vincent Ignizio resigned on February 15, 2007 after winning a municipal special election to the New York City Council, triggering a special election. In special elections for state legislative offices, primaries are usually not held – county committee members and district leaders for each party select nominees.

2007 New York State Assembly special election, District 62
Party	Candidate	Votes	%
Republican	Louis Tobacco	2,308	
Albany Reform	Louis Tobacco	101	
Total	Louis Tobacco	2,409	62.7
Democratic	John Mulia	774	
Conservative	John Mulia	178	
Independence	John Mulia	56	
Total	John Mulia	1,008	26.3
Write-in	Todd Tabacco	383	10.0
Write-in		39	1.0
Total votes		3,839	100.0
Republican hold			

=== 2006 ===
2006 New York State Assembly election, District 62
Party	Candidate	Votes	%
Republican	Vincent Ignizio	13,515	
Conservative	Vincent Ignizio	1,576	
Independence	Vincent Ignizio	1,040	
Total	Vincent Ignizio (incumbent)	16,131	99.9
Write-in		22	0.1
Total votes		16,153	100.0
Republican hold			

=== 2004 ===
2004 New York State Assembly election, District 64
Primary election
Party	Candidate	Votes	%
Republican	Vincent Ignizio	1,727	41.2
Republican	Robert Straniere (incumbent)	1,343	32.1
Republican	Mario Bruno	1,119	26.7
Write-in		0	0.2
Total votes		4,189	100.0
General election
Republican	Vincent Ignizio	26,649	64.7
Democratic	Emanuele Innamorato	7,538	18.3
Independence	Robert Straniere	3,893	
Working Families	Robert Straniere	1,131	
Total	Robert Straniere (incumbent)	5,024	12.2
Conservative	Mario Bruno	1,952	4.8
Write-in		0	0.0
Total votes		41,163	100.0
Republican hold			

=== 2002 ===
2002 New York State Assembly election, District 62
Primary election
Party	Candidate	Votes	%
Republican	Robert Straniere (incumbent)	1,299	53.2
Republican	David Mercaldo	1,140	46.7
Write-in		3	0.1
Total votes		2,442	100.0
General election
Republican	Robert Straniere	13,906	
Independence	Robert Straniere	671	
Working Families	Robert Straniere	286	
Total	Robert Straniere (incumbent)	14,863	64.0
Democratic	John Mulia	5,818	
Conservative	John Mulia	2,034	
Right to Life	John Mulia	516	
Total	John Mulia	8,368	36.0
Write-in		0	0.0
Total votes		23,231	100.0
Republican win (new boundaries)			

=== 2000 ===
2000 New York State Assembly election, District 62
Party	Candidate	Votes	%
Democratic	Sheldon Silver	19,535	
Liberal	Sheldon Silver	549	
Total	Sheldon Silver (incumbent)	20,084	85.2
Green	Raymond Dowd	3,485	14.8
Write-in		1	0.0
Total votes		23,570	100.0
Democratic hold			

=== Federal results in Assembly District 62 ===
Year	Office	Results
2024	President	Trump 78.1 - 20.9%
2024	Senate	Sapraicone 76.1 - 23.5%
2022	Senate	Pinion 77.6 – 22.0%
2020	President	Trump 73.6 – 25.4%
2018	Senate	Farley 66.1 - 33.8%
2016	President	Trump 74.1 - 23.4%
2016	Senate	Schumer 49.9 – 49.0%
2012	President	Romney 65.5 – 33.5%
2012	Senate	Gillibrand 51.2 – 47.6%
