= Saladino =

Saladino is a surname. Notable people with the name include:

- Gaspar Saladino (1927–2016), American letterer and logo designer
- Irving Saladino (born 1983), Panamanian long jumper
- Joseph P. Saladino (born 1993), American YouTube personality and prankster, known as Joey Salads
- Joseph S. Saladino (born 1962), New York politician
- Tyler Saladino (born 1989), American baseball player
