= Joey Salads =

American YouTuber (born 1993)

- Born: Joseph Peter Saladino; December 10, 1993 (age 32); New York City, U.S.
- Occupation: YouTuber
- Political party: Republican

YouTube information
- Channel: JoeySalads
- Years active: 2012–present
- Genre: Comedy
- Subscribers: 10.4 million
- Views: 1.5 billion
- Website: joeysalads.com

Joseph Peter Saladino (born December 10, 1993), known professionally as Joey Salads, is an American YouTube personality and prankster from New York City. His eponymous main channel, and second channel Just Viral TV have a total of 557,066,992 video views and over 10 million subscribers combined. He became well known on YouTube for faking viral pranks and social experiments, some with messages that many perceived as racist.

== Personal life ==
Saladino grew up in Prince's Bay, Staten Island, New York City. His former boss, the manager of a local pizzeria, has stated that Saladino "tweaked operations" to force the restaurant to run more efficiently.

Saladino attended St. Joseph by-the-Sea High School. He then attended classes at the College of Staten Island, but claims to have "learned nothing" there and dropped out to pursue his YouTube career. He was removed from social media platform Twitter in May 2020. A spokesperson from Twitter stated, "the account was permanently suspended for repeated violations of our platform manipulation and spam policy".

== Career ==
=== Beyond the Neon ===
In 2022, Salads starred in the American thriller movie, Beyond the Neon. Directed by Larry A McLean and written by Marisa Dzintars and Woodrow Wilson Hancock III, the film takes on a gonzo-journalistic style that immerses the audience into the ride.

Salads was brought on to the project after the second year of R&D as the project called for someone with real-life experience in dangerous situations and social experiments. Beyond the Neon is based on true accounts and follows the story of a Las Vegas escort named Sasha (played by Gila Goodman) who is recognized by her sister Tracy (played by Cynthia Lucero) in a viral social experiment video created by Salads, who plays his internet persona.

Motivated to reunite the sisters and capture the reunion on camera, Salads and his apprehensive crew are forced into the dangerous and corrupt world of escorting, all while filming every step of their desperate effort to rescue the woman from human sex trafficking in Las Vegas.

The movie features real footage of a Las Vegas safe house for trafficked survivors, interviews from real survivors in recovery, and other organic documented experiences from the filmmakers throughout.

Beyond the Neon had a limited theatrical release starting on October 14, 2022, and is now available to stream on Amazon Prime and other VOD platforms. Despite some controversy surrounding Salads' involvement in the film, it has been praised for shedding light on the issue of human trafficking and raising awareness of this important social issue.

=== YouTube ===
Saladino registered the Joey Salads YouTube account in 2012, and uploaded roughly one video per week. Many of his early videos were Jackass-style pranks, though his content became more political following Donald Trump's bid for president in 2016. He has described his videos as "edgy" and "dumb pranks" made to entertain.

Saladino has admitted to staging pranks on more than one occasion. He has been criticized for faking his prank and social experiment videos, as well as for promoting a narrative that portrays African Americans as violent. In his video "Black people don't like Trump", published in 2016, Saladino leaves a car with Donald Trump campaign stickers in a mostly African American neighborhood. Then several African Americans appear, break into the car, and break its windows. After receiving backlash from critics including h3h3Productions for misportraying black Americans, Saladino admitted the video was staged with actors.

One video that did not appear to be staged was one of Saladino urinating in his own mouth and placing his penis in a hot dog bun. The video has since been deleted but images remain available.

=== Congressional campaign ===
In 2019, Saladino began campaigning for the Republican primary in New York's 11th congressional district, which encompasses Staten Island and a small section of Brooklyn. His campaign raised a total of $66,704.22 during this time. Saladino withdrew his candidacy on December 13, 2019, and stated his endorsement for fellow Republican candidate Joe Caldarera. He has been accused of running to boost his public profile.

Saladino was incorrectly identified as attending the "Unite the Right" protest at Charlottesville after a photo of him wearing a swastika armband began circulating on Twitter. Saladino was in Jamaica during the event, with Saladino claiming the image was taken from a prank video he had uploaded to YouTube months beforehand.

He filed a formal complaint against congresswoman Alexandria Ocasio-Cortez in response to the congresswoman blocking him on Twitter, citing a ruling that prevents elected officials from censoring speech on public forums.
