= Abraham Manee House =

Building in Staten Island, New York

Coordinates: 40.515198°N 74.197559°W

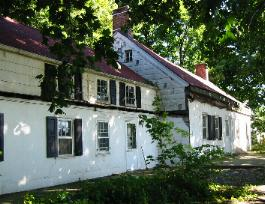
Abraham Manee Homestead

The Abraham Manee House, also known as the Manee-Seguine Homestead, is a three-part Colonial Dutch dwelling in Prince's Bay on Staten Island in New York City, New York, U.S. It was designated a New York City landmark in 1984. Located on Purdy Place adjacent to Lemon Creek, on the South Shore of Staten Island, the oldest section is a one-room structure built by Paulus Regrenier in 1670, a French Huguenot fleeing religious persecution in Europe. The building is similar to the Billiou-Stillwell-Perine House in Old Town.

An addition made of rubble-stone and tabby was added by another early French Huguenot settler, Abraham Manee, in the late 18th century. The Seguine family purchased the homestead in the 1780s and built a wooden addition in the early part of the 19th century.

It was a tavern and inn named Purdy's Hotel in the late 19th century.

Of architectural noteworthiness are the spring eaves that are evident of Flemish design on the north side of the house. It is purported to be one of the oldest Dutch structures on Staten Island and was threatened with demolition..

In January 2017, a judge ordered the owners to repair the structure or pay an $8.5 million fine. The judge supported the city's request for an injunction to stop the owners from "continuing their policy of 'demolition by neglect'."

== See also ==
- List of the oldest buildings in New York
- List of New York City Designated Landmarks in Staten Island
- National Register of Historic Places listings in Richmond County, New York
