= Lemon Creek (Staten Island) =

Urban stream in Staten Island, New York

Coordinates: 40°30′46.4″N 74°11′57.6″W

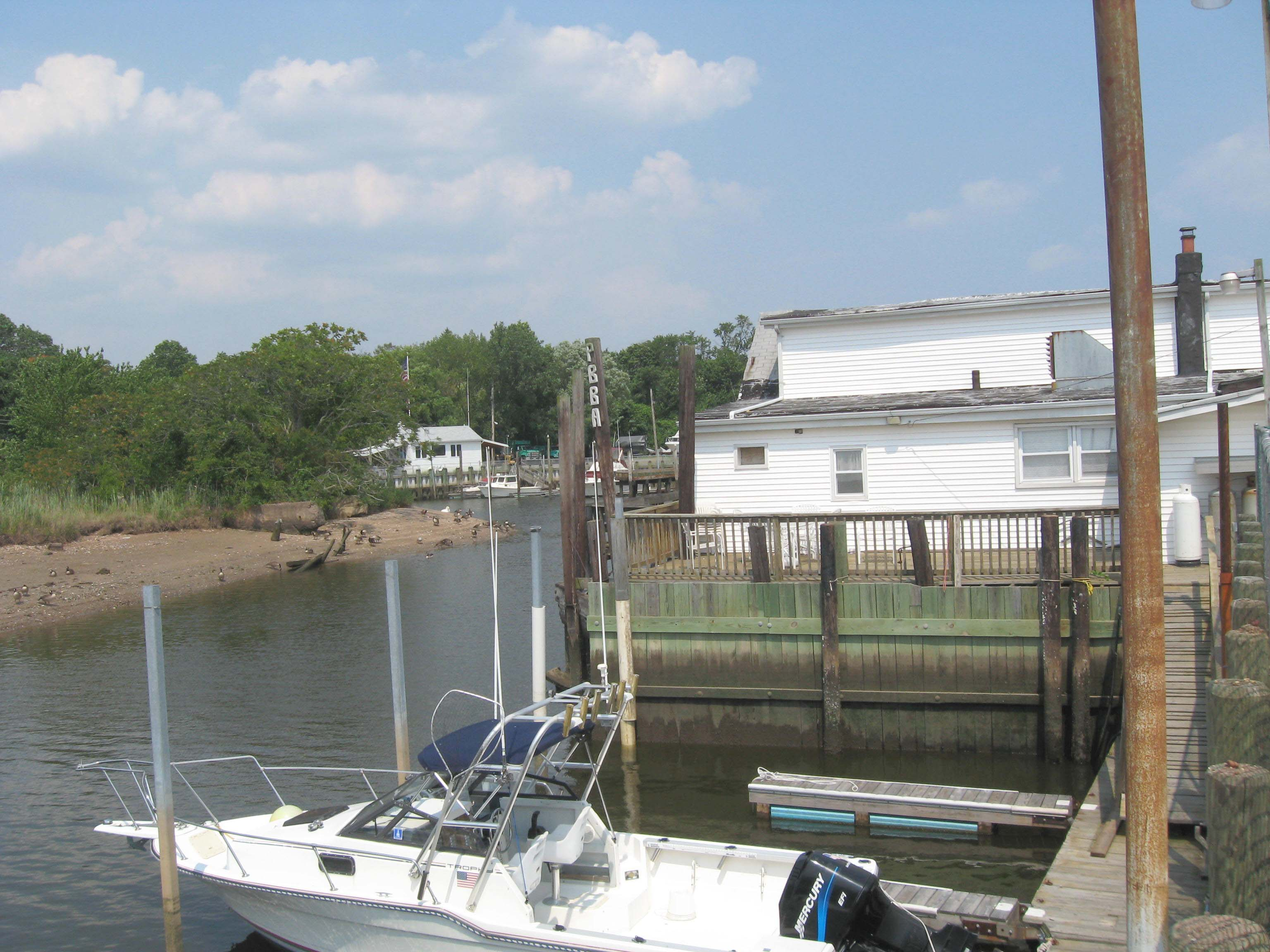
Looking upstream

Lemon Creek is a stream located on the South Shore of Staten Island in New York City. It is one of the few remaining ground-level creeks in New York City.

== Geography ==
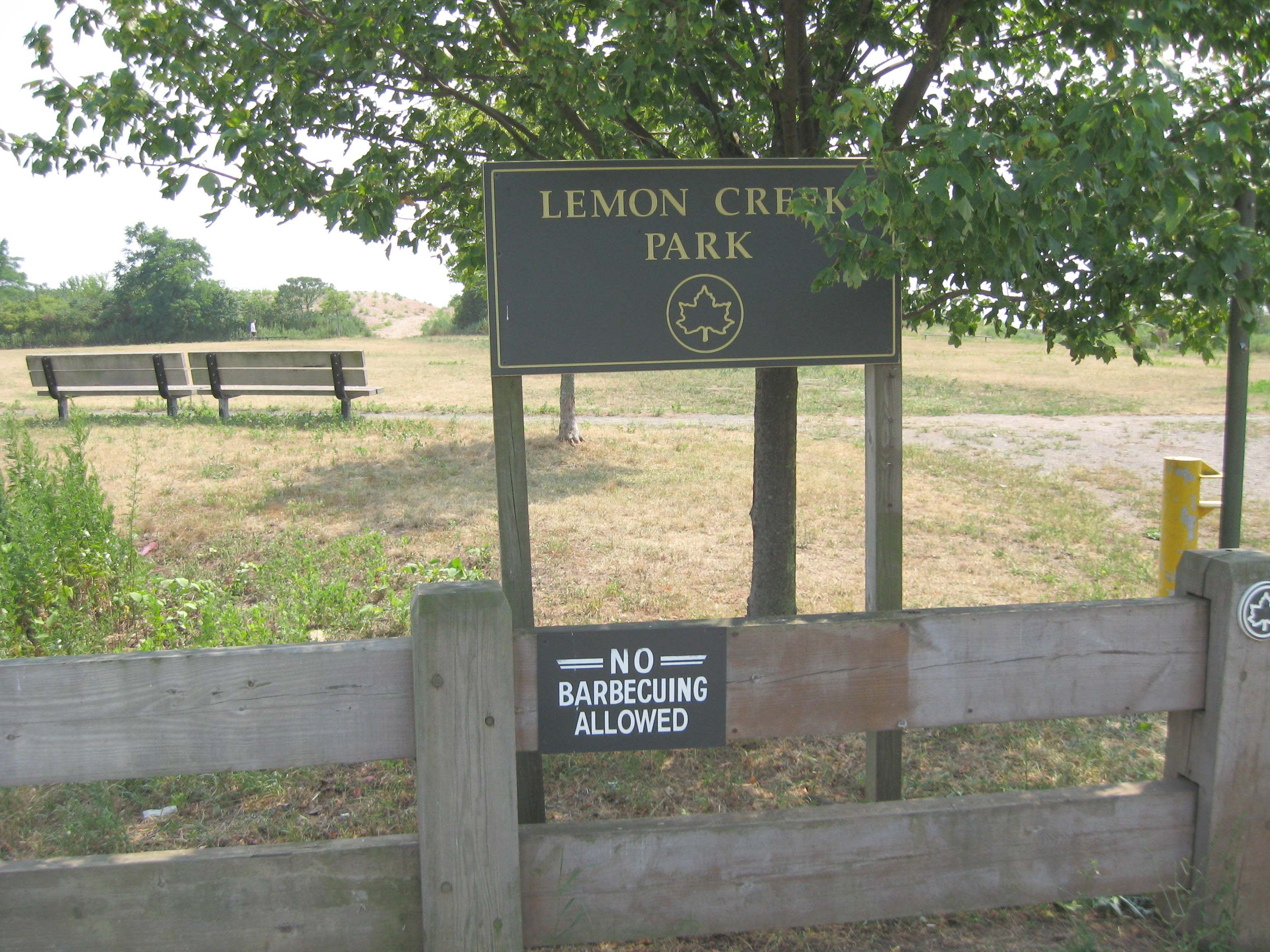
Southern part of the Lemon Creek Park

Lemon Creek emerges from a conduit under Rossville Avenue and flows into Porzio's Pond, located north of the intersection of Woodrow Road and Maguire Avenue. Water from the pond reaches Lemon Creek both above ground and underground. Flowing generally southward, near the intersection of Drumgoole Road West and Maguire Avenue, Sandy Brook empties into the creek. This small stream now originates just south of Sharrotts Road and east of the West Shore Expressway. Lemon Creek continues southward under the Korean War Veterans Parkway and Drumgoole Roads, and begins to widen among marshes south of the Staten Island Railway. The creek turns eastward and passes under Bayview Avenue, then southward again. Just above its mouth, it receives a tributary from the east draining Wolfe's Pond, which is located within a city park of the same name. A marina and boat moorings are located here. Immediately below, it empties into Prince's Bay, part of Raritan Bay, just off the corner of Bayview Avenue and Johnston Terrace.

Throughout its above-ground length, Lemon Creek is generally regarded as the boundary between the neighborhoods of Prince's Bay and Pleasant Plains on Staten Island's South Shore. Its watershed covers about 2 square miles (5.2 km^{2}) and lies within the terminal moraine crossing Staten Island. The lower reaches of the creek, below the Staten Island Railway, are bordered by extensive marshes, the largest and most pristine on the south shore of Staten Island. This area includes both salt marsh and the only tidal freshwater marsh on Staten Island.

=== Parks ===
Much of the creek below Hylan Boulevard, and a long strip of shoreline to the west, is part of the 105.77 acres (42.80 hectares) Lemon Creek Park, established in 1962. The park includes the Seguine Mansion. The northern, wooded portion of the park forms the 15.99 acres (6.47 hectares) Lemon Creek Park Preserve. Wolfe's Pond and its source, Wolfe Brook, comprise the 341.33 acres (138.13 hectares) Wolfe's Pond Park. The upper reaches of Lemon Creek, and most of Sandy Brook flow through Bloomingdale Park, 138.67 acres (56.12 hectares).

== History ==
The creek first appears in recorded history in 1670, as one of the boundaries of a 140-acre (56.7 ha) grant of land to Paulus Regrenier. The Abraham Manee Homestead may encompass Regrenier's original dwelling.

Clams were once abundant at the mouth of the creek, in Prince's Bay. The oysters harvested there were once a delicacy exported to London, and the export of oysters helped make the fortune of the local Seguine family. However, shellfishing ceased in the area in the 1920s due to an outbreak of typhoid fever traced to Raritan Bay oysters. However, while non-commercial clamming is still forbidden due to pollution, commercial clamming is permitted if the clams are transplanted into clean water before harvest, and the Lemon Creek marina is again a base for clamming vessels.

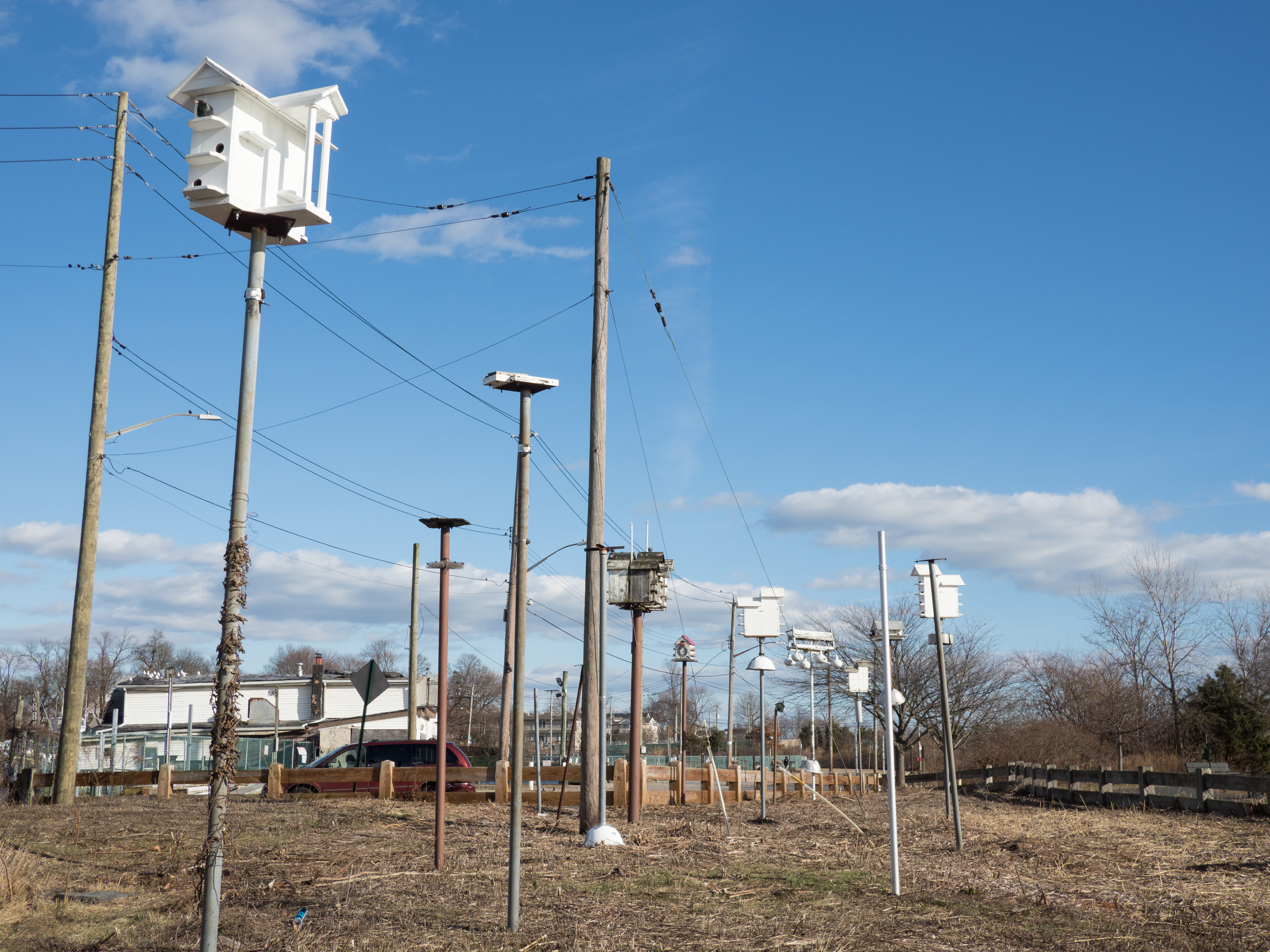
Birdhouses constructed as a purple martin colony, inhabited by starlings in the winter.

Known in 1830 as Seguine's Creek for the Seguine family, this body of water was referred to as the Little North River by 1895. Shortly thereafter, it began to be called Lemon Creek, although the origin of the name is not known.

== Fauna ==
The marshes along the lower creek provide a home for waterfowl such as swans, mallards, and black ducks, and a refuge for migrating birds, as well as monarch butterflies. Lemon Creek Park is also home to the only purple martin colony in New York City, popular among local birdwatchers.

In the center of the marshes on the lower creek is Ziel's Island, also known as Crab Island for the fiddler crabs and blue crabs that live there. Clams are commercially harvested off the mouth of the creek, and various marine fish can be caught from a fishing pier at the mouth of the creek.
