= 5910 Amboy Road =

Historic house in Staten Island, New York

- House at 5910 Amboy Road
- U.S. National Register of Historic Places
- New York City Landmark
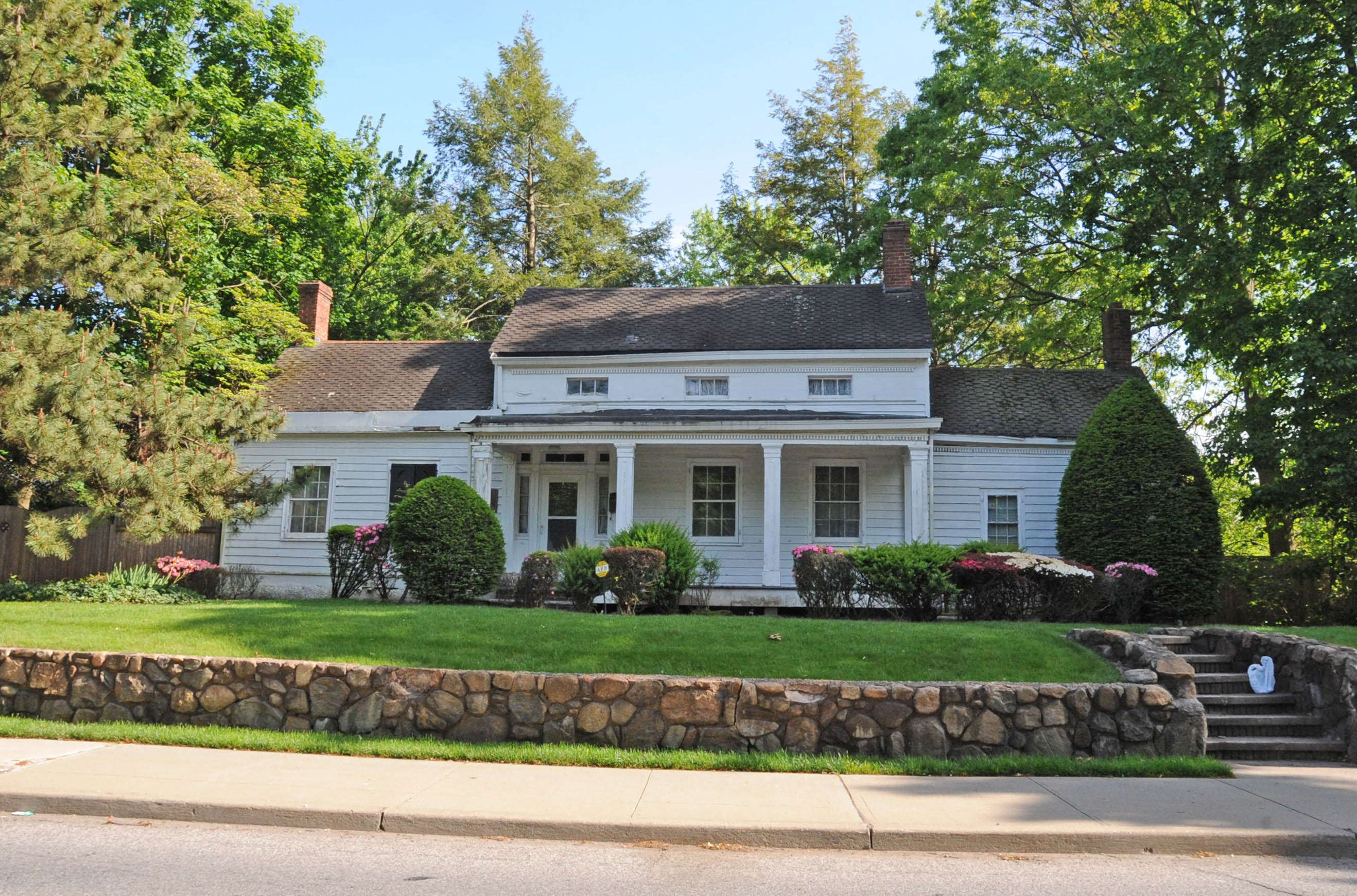

- Location within New York City Location within New York Location within the United States
- Location: 5910 Amboy Rd., Staten Island, New York
- Coordinates: 40°31′32″N 74°12′16″W
- Area: less than one acre
- Built: 1840
- Architectural style: Greek Revival
- NRHP reference No.: 82001263
- NYCL No.: 0841

Significant dates
- Added to NRHP: December 16, 1982
- Designated NYCL: March 19, 1974

5910 Amboy Road is a historic house located at Prince's Bay, Staten Island, New York. It was built about 1840 in the Greek Revival style. It is a frame house, sheathed with clapboard siding with a three bay central section flanked by two "stepped down" flanking wings. It features a central porch with four square paneled columns. It was added to the National Register of Historic Places on December 16, 1982.

== See also ==
- List of New York City Designated Landmarks in Staten Island
- National Register of Historic Places listings in Richmond County, New York
