= Ronald Castorina =

American politician and attorney

Ronald Castorina, Jr.

Justice of the New York State Supreme Court, Richmond County
- Incumbent
- Assumed office January 1, 2022

Judge of the New York City Civil Court, Richmond County
- In office January 1, 2021 – December 31, 2021
- Preceded by: Kim Dollard

Member of the New York State Assembly from the 62nd district
- In office May 10, 2016 – January 2, 2019
- Preceded by: Joseph Borelli
- Succeeded by: Michael Reilly

Personal details
- Party: Republican
- Education: St. Francis College (BA); University of Buffalo (JD)

Ronald Castorina, Jr. is an American judge, politician and attorney from New York. A Republican, Castorina represented the 62nd District in the New York State Assembly from May 10, 2016 to January 2, 2019. In 2020, he was elected as a judge of the New York City Civil Court, and in 2021, he was elected to a judgeship in the Supreme Court, Richmond County.

== Life and career ==
Castorina was born and raised on Staten Island. He attended St. Francis College and then received a Juris Doctor from the University of Buffalo School of Law. He is a member of the Army National Guard.

Following his law school graduation, Castorina worked as counsel to New York City Councilmember Vincent Ignizio before becoming the Republican commissioner for the Staten Island Board of Elections for New York City. Castorina gained citywide attention when he sued the City Department of Education after it proposed to take school buses away from middle schoolers in Staten Island.

In 2015, Castorina was chosen by the Staten Island Republican Party to replace former Assemblymember Joseph Borelli, who had resigned after winning the vacated New York City Council seat of Vincent Ignizio. While he initially faced two challengers for the Republican nomination, Castorina went on to receive the endorsement of the party. He ran unopposed in the April 19, 2016 special election and was sworn into office on May 3, 2016. He successfully ran for election to a full term in November 2016. In May 2017, he was elected Chairman of the Staten Island Republican Party, succeeding John Antoniello.

In 2016, during a speech on the Assembly floor, Castorina referred to abortion as "African-American genocide"; this remark drew the ire of some New York State Assembly colleagues that support abortion rights.

Along with Assemblymember Nicole Malliotakis, Castorina sued NYC Mayor Bill de Blasio concerning the use of the city's new ID cards by people without lawful residency status in the United States.

As a member of the Assembly, Castorina voted against the Gender Expression Non-Discrimination Act, which would have added gender identity and expression as a protected class in New York's human rights and hate crimes laws.

In 2018, Castorina ran against Democratic Assemblyman Matthew Titone for Richmond County Surrogate Judge. Castorina lost the race by a small margin.

In 2020, Castorina declared his candidacy for a judgeship on the New York City Civil Court. He ran against Democrat attorney Allyn Crawford and prevailed, receiving over 57% of the vote. He began serving as a judge in 2021.

Castorina ran for a state Supreme Court judgeship in Richmond County in 2021. He declined to participate in the review process of the Richmond County and New York City Bar Associations, asserting that the process was politically biased; due to his lack of participation, he received a "not approved" rating from both. On November 2, 2021, he won the election.

Castorina is openly gay and has been with his partner Tom since 2010.

== See also ==
- List of LGBT jurists in the United States

Political offices
Preceded by Joseph Borelli	New York Assembly, 62nd District; 2016–2018	Succeeded by Michael Reilly
