= Prince's Bay, Staten Island =

Neighborhood in New York City

Coordinates: 40°31′28″N 74°12′01″W

Prince's Bay is a neighborhood located on the South Shore of New York City's borough of Staten Island. Prince's Bay is bordered to the north by Huguenot, to the south by the Raritan Bay, and to the west by Pleasant Plains. The neighborhood is represented in the New York State Senate by Andrew Lanza, in the New York State Assembly by Michael Reilly, and in the New York City Council by Joe Borelli.

The neighborhood's name is often mispronounced as "Princess Bay" or "Prince Bay." It is believed the town was originally called Princess Bay for reasons unknown. A 1776 map of Staten Island shows it as Princess Bay. The community's United States Post Office officially bears the name "Princes Bay Station" according to the USPS web site and directory.

Prince's Bay's ZIP Code is 10309, which it shares with other South Shore neighborhoods including Charleston, Pleasant Plains and Richmond Valley. The western part of Prince's Bay is now commonly recognized as a separate neighborhood, known as Rossville.

== History ==
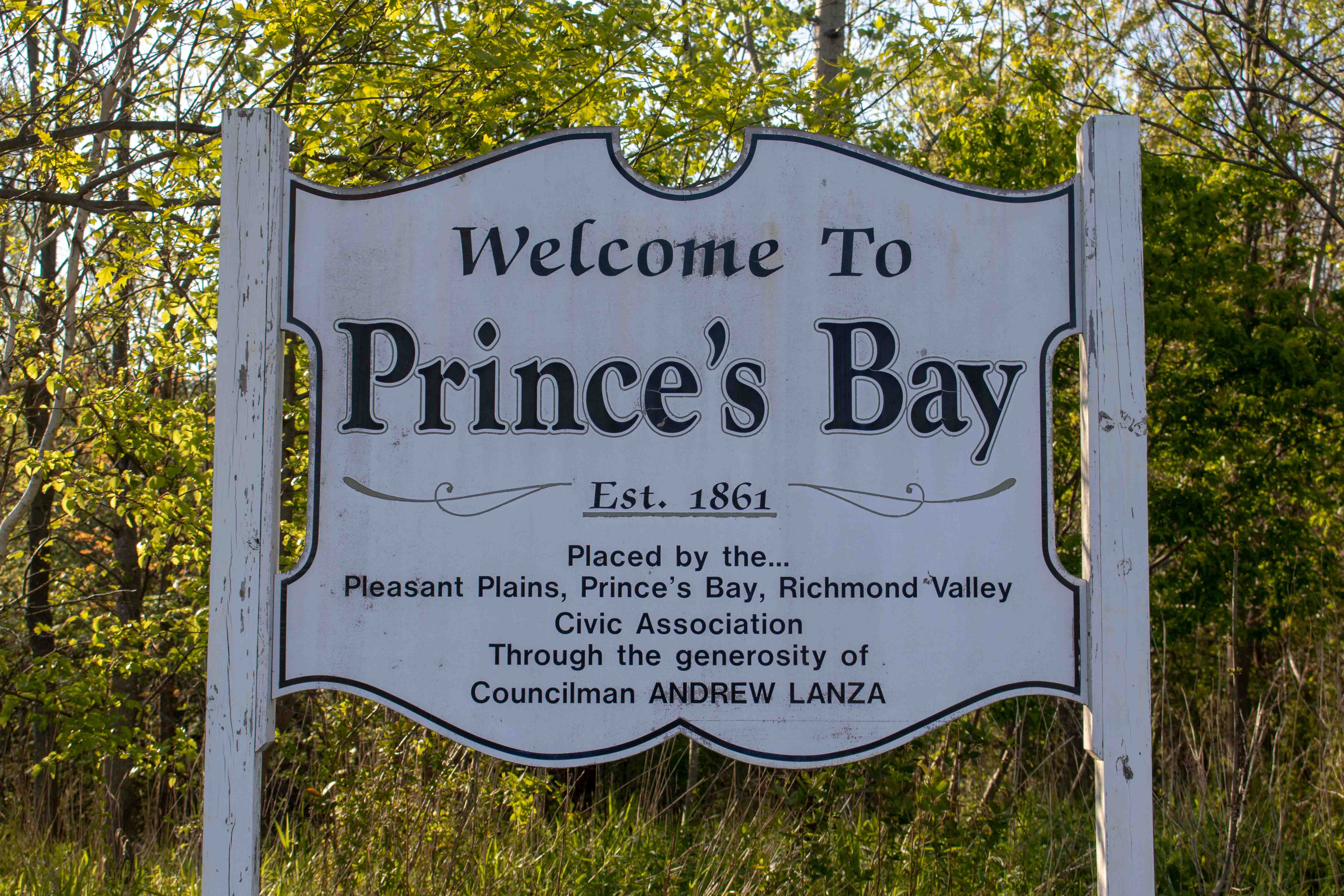
Prince's Bay Welcome Sign

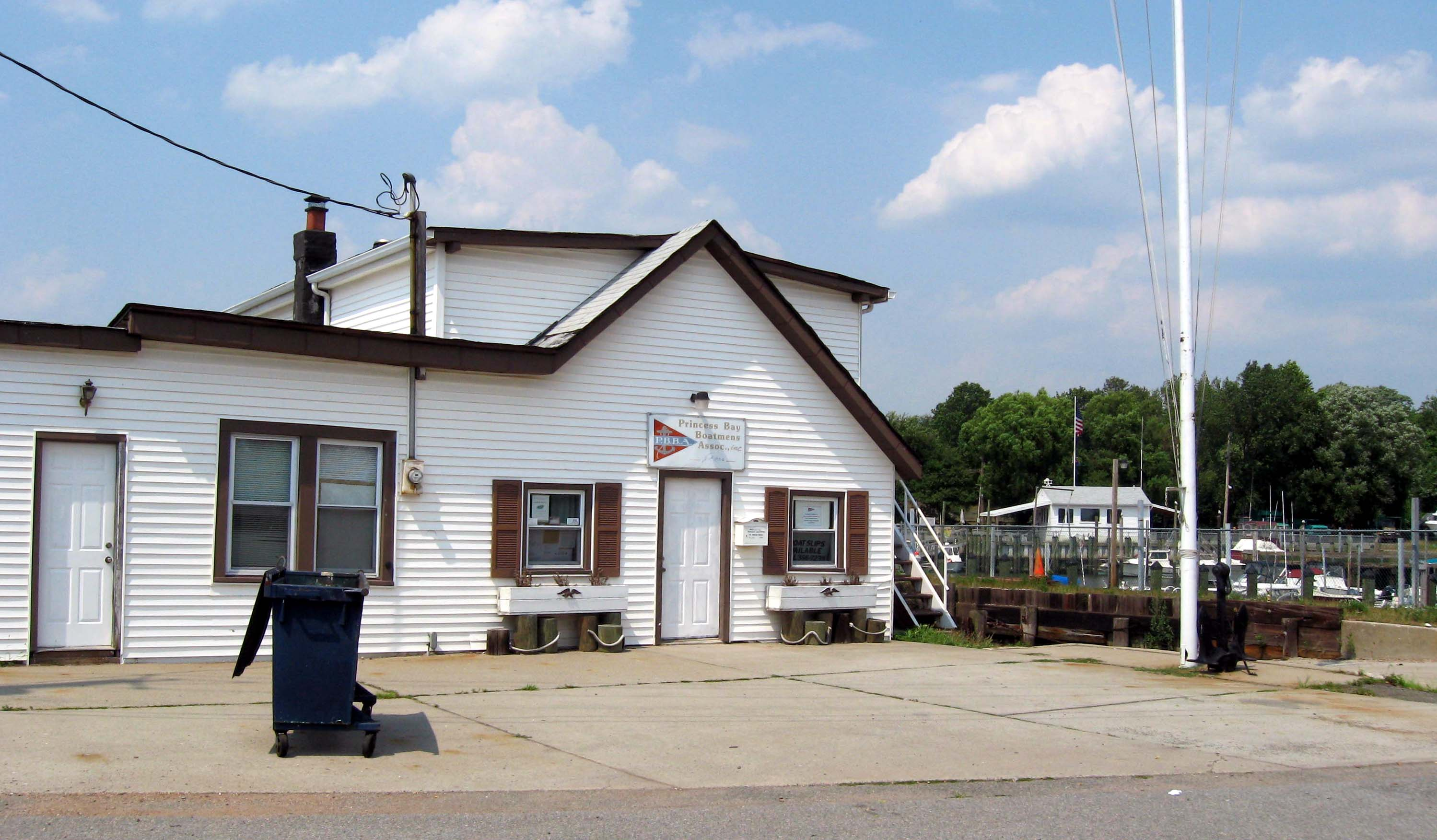
Princess Bay Boatmens Association

Development in the area accelerated when the southern terminus of the Staten Island Railway was moved from Eltingville to Tottenville in 1860. The Prince's Bay station crosses underneath Seguine Avenue, formerly known as Prince's Bay Road.

Primarily a fishing village at first, its oysters were so famous that "Prince's Bay Oysters" could often be found on menus at prominent seafood restaurants in Manhattan, and even London. A large factory, operated by the S.S. White Dental Manufacturing Company, was once located along the shoreline at the foot of Seguine Avenue; at one point, the plant was the largest employer in all of Staten Island, but closed in 1972. In the late 1970s, a small shopping center, known as the Prince's Bay Trade Mart, was opened in the former factory complex; but its remote location and inability to compete with the larger and already-established Staten Island Mall doomed the project to failure, and it closed a few years later. The vacant complex was burned and razed, and the site has been kept empty due to ground contamination.

At the northeast corner of the neighborhood is Wolfe's Pond Park, a city park that was the scene of a gruesome homicide committed by Gus Farace (at the time a Prince's Bay resident) and three accomplices in 1979. Lemon Creek flows into the pond for which the park is named; the creek can then be traced westward into land where dairy and poultry farms flourished until the 1960s, eventually travelling by underground conduits to the Arthur Kill.

Prince's Bay and other communities on Staten Island's South Shore were once popular locations for summer homes, most of which were owned by residents of other boroughs, particularly Manhattan; however, these declined when the surrounding waters became increasingly polluted during the middle third of the 20th Century. The neighborhood also featured several small hotels, the Christmas Tree Inn on Wilbur Street being perhaps the most prominent among them. One block west of the latter is the South Campus of Staten Island University Hospital, formerly known as Richmond Memorial Hospital, which has the distinction of being the southernmost acute-care facility in both New York City and New York State.

In recent decades, the area's waterfront has been revitalized by the development of many upscale single-family homes, becoming one of the more affluent areas on Staten Island.

== Demographics ==
For census purposes, the New York City Department of City Planning classifies Prince's Bay as part of a larger Neighborhood Tabulation Area called Annadale-Huguenot-Prince's Bay-Woodrow SI0304. This designated neighborhood had 40,534 inhabitants based on data from the 2020 United States Census. This was an increase of 2,374 persons (6.2%) from the 38,160 counted in 2010. The neighborhood had a population density of 9.9 inhabitants per acre (14,500/sq mi; 5,600/km2).

The racial makeup of the neighborhood was 82.1% (33,263) White (Non-Hispanic), 0.7% (299) Black (Non-Hispanic), 5.9% (2,372) Asian, 2.3% (945) from some other race or from two or more races. Hispanic or Latino of any race were 9.0% (3,655) of the population.

According to the 2020 United States Census, this area has many cultural communities of over 1,000 inhabitants. These groups are residents who identify as Puerto Rican, English, Polish, Russian, Chinese, German, Irish, and Italian.

Most inhabitants are higher-aged adults: 28.5% are between 45 and 64 years old. 74.1% of the households had at least one family present. Out of the 14,464 households, 58.0% had a married couple (23.3% with a child under 18), 3.9% had a cohabiting couple (1.2% with a child under 18), 14.8% had a single male (1.4% with a child under 18), and 23.2% had a single female (3.5% with a child under 18). 32.5% of households had children. In this neighborhood, 26.3% of non-vacant housing units are renter-occupied.

== Points of interest ==
The Abraham Manee House is one of the oldest houses in the five boroughs of New York City. The beams in the oldest part of the house date to 1670, while that part of the building is dated to 1690. Although designated a New York City Landmark by the NYC Preservation Committee (currently marked as endangered by the LPC), it seems that the local landlord, Leo Tallo, wishes to demolish it to build more townhouses. The house is located at 509 Seguine Avenue.

The Seguine Mansion is a historic house with an equestrian center with peacocks and horses. Some parts of the home date back to 1670 and have been deemed endangered by the New York City's Preservation Committee.

Wolfe's Pond Park and Lemon Creek Park are located in Prince's Bay. These parks contain children's playgrounds, open fields for outdoor sports such as football, baseball and soccer. These parks also contain running trails and divided dog parks for big and little dogs.

The House at 5910 Amboy Road was listed on the National Register of Historic Places in 1982.

== Education ==
=== Public libraries ===
New York Public Library operates the Huguenot Park Branch, which serves Prince's Bay and other neighborhoods, at 830 Huguenot Avenue at Drumgoole Road East. The branch opened in January 1985.

=== Educational facilities ===
Prince's Bay is home to Margaret Gioiosa Elementary School (P.S. 3) and Elias Bernstein Intermediate School (I.S. 7). St. Joseph-St. Thomas is a private Catholic school that serves grades Pre-K3-8.

== Transportation ==
Prince's Bay is served by the Staten Island Railway station of the same name.

It is served by the S55 and S56 local buses on Seguine Avenue, and the S59 and S78 local buses on Hylan Boulevard. It is also served by express buses to/from Manhattan: the SIM25 along Hylan and on Foster Road/Seguine Avenue, the SIM2 along Hylan as well as Huguenot Avenue, and the SIM24 along Huguenot Avenue.

In 2018 Commuter Fast Ferry service to/from Midtown and Downtown Manhattan was under study for Prince's Bay.
