= Vincent M. Ignizio =

American politician

Vincent Ignizio
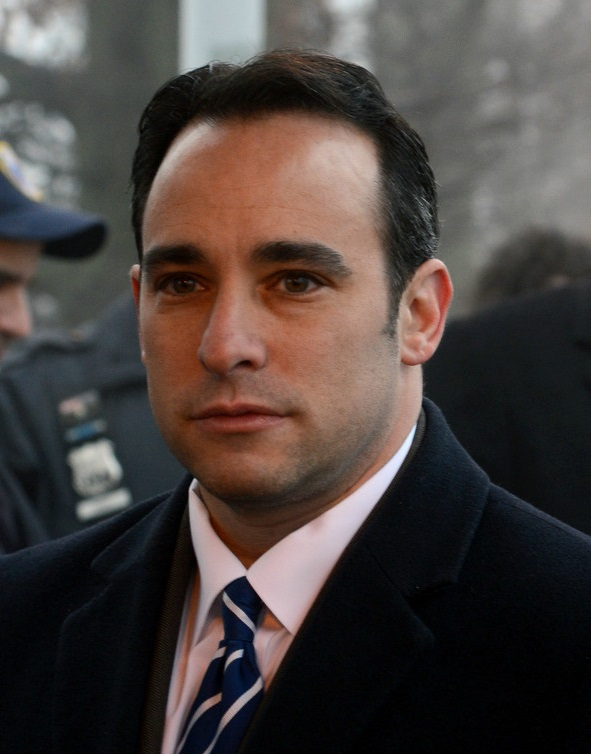

Minority Leader of the New York City Council
- In office January 1, 2014 – June 30, 2015
- Whip: Steven Matteo
- Preceded by: James Oddo
- Succeeded by: Steven Matteo

Member of the New York City Council from the 51st district
- In office February 20, 2007 – July 10, 2015
- Preceded by: Andrew Lanza
- Succeeded by: Joe Borelli

Member of the New York State Assembly from the 62nd district
- In office January 1, 2005 – February 19, 2007
- Preceded by: Robert Straniere
- Succeeded by: Louis Tobacco

Personal details
- Born: October 2, 1974 (age 51) Brooklyn, New York, U.S.
- Party: Republican
- Spouse: Letizia Ignizio
- Education: Rider University
- Profession: Politician
- Website: NYC Council: District 51

Vincent M. Ignizio (born October 2, 1974) is an American politician and former member and Minority Leader of the New York City Council representing Staten Island's 51st district. Before being elected to the City Council, he was a member of the New York State Assembly.

His City Council District consists of neighborhoods found on the South Shore of Staten Island, including Annadale, Arden Heights, Bay Terrace, Charleston, Eltingville, Great Kills, Huguenot, New Dorp, New Springville, Oakwood, Pleasant Plains, Prince's Bay, Richmond Valley, Richmondtown, Rossville, Tottenville, and Woodrow.

In 2015, he was replaced by former Assemblyman and outspoken conservative Joe Borelli, after he resigned to take a position as the CEO of Catholic Charities of Staten Island.

== Career ==
Prior to his election to the New York State Assembly in 2004, Ignizio served as the Chief of Staff to former Staten Island City Councilmember Stephen Fiala, and then as the Chief of Staff of City Councilmember Andrew J. Lanza. In 2004, he launched a successful campaign to unseat Assemblymember Robert Straniere, who had held this seat since 1981. Even though he had not earned the support of the Conservative Party of New York State, which usually cross-endorses Republican nominees, he won the general election, defeating Straniere, who was running on a third-party line; Mario Bruno Jr., the Conservative endorsee; and Emanuele Innamorato, his main Democratic Party opponent.

During his two years as an assemblyman, Ignizio served at various times as Ranking Minority Member of the Social Services Committee, Ranking Minority Member of the Alcoholism and Drug Abuse Committee and Ranking Minority Member of the Corporations, Authorities and Commissions Committee. During his tenure as the chief Republican on the Corporations Committee, the committee held a series of highly public hearings on public authorities in the state, along with issues surrounding electricity delivery in the city. These investigations and hearings were initiated by the committee's chairman, Richard Brodsky of Westchester. In addition to his committee appointments, Ignizio served as Chairman of the Assembly Republican Review Committee.

In January 2007, he announced his candidacy in a special election for New York City Council member for the 51st district. The special election was held to fill the Council vacancy of Andrew Lanza, who resigned his seat when he was elected to the New York State Senate in November 2006. On February 20, 2007, Ignizio was elected with 74 percent of the vote against Democrat Emmanuele Innamorato.

In September 2007, he was named one of City Hall's "40 under 40" for being a young influential member of New York City politics. As a councilman, Ignizio serves on the Education Committee, the Environmental Protection Committee, the Land Use Committee, the Standards and Ethics Committee and the Transportation Committee. In addition to serving on the Planning Subcommittee, he is a member of the Budget Negotiation Team for the Council.

In May 2015, he announced that he would be leaving the City Council to take on a role as head of Staten Island Catholic Charities.

In December 2021, he was named as the Deputy Executive Director of the New York City Board of Elections.

== Personal life ==
Ignizio holds a B.A. in communications and journalism from Rider University in Lawrenceville, New Jersey. He has lived on the South Shore for over 30 years, attending PS 42 in Eltingville, IS 7 and St. Joseph by the Sea High School in Huguenot. He currently resides with his wife Letizia and daughter Lina in Annadale. He is a parishioner at Holy Child Church and a member of the Knights of Columbus.

== Electoral history ==
=== 2014 ===
2014 New York City Council minority leader election
Party	Candidate	Votes	%
Republican	Vincent M. Ignizio (District 51)	3 (Note: The three votes for Ignizio were cast by Ignizio himself, Steven Matteo, and Eric Ulrich.)	100.0
Total votes		3	100.0
Votes necessary		2	>50.0

=== 2013 ===
2013 New York City Council election, District 51
Party	Candidate	Votes	%
Republican	Vincent M. Ignizio	15,157	60.9
Conservative	Vincent M. Ignizio	2,434	9.8
Independence	Vincent M. Ignizio	734	2.9
Total	Vincent M. Ignizio (incumbent)	18,325	73.6
Democratic	Christopher Walsh	6,540	26.3
Write-in		25	0.1
Total votes		24,890	100.0
Republican hold			

=== 2009 ===
2009 New York City Council election, District 51
Party	Candidate	Votes	%
Republican	Vincent M. Ignizio	15,192	53.8
Conservative	Vincent M. Ignizio	2,093	7.4
Independence	Vincent M. Ignizio	1,372	4.9
Total	Vincent M. Ignizio (incumbent)	18,657	66.1
Democratic	Janine Materna	8,655	30.7
Working Families	Janine Materna	893	3.2
Total	Janine Materna	9,548	33.8
Write-in		7	0.1
Total votes		28,212	100.0
Republican hold			

=== 2007 ===
2007 New York City's 51st City Council District special election
Party	Candidate	Votes	%
Most Experienced	Vincent M. Ignizio	4,216	74.0
A Better South Shore	Manny Innamorato	1,479	26.0
Total votes		5,695	100.0
Republican hold			

2007 New York City Council election, District 51
Party	Candidate	Votes	%
Republican	Vincent M. Ignizio	4,935	72.2
Conservative	Vincent M. Ignizio	1,228	18.0
Independence	Vincent M. Ignizio	660	9.7
Total	Vincent M. Ignizio (incumbent)	6,823	99.9
Write-in		9	0.1
Total votes		6,832	100.0
Republican hold			

=== 2006 ===
2006 New York State Assembly election, District 62
Party	Candidate	Votes	%
Republican	Vincent M. Ignizio	13,515	83.7
Conservative	Vincent M. Ignizio	1,576	9.8
Independence	Vincent M. Ignizio	1,040	6.4
Total	Vincent M. Ignizio (incumbent)	16,131	99.9
Write-in		22	0.1
Total votes		16,153	100.0
Republican hold			

=== 2004 ===
2004 New York State Assembly Republican primary, District 62
Party	Candidate	Votes	%
Republican	Vincent M. Ignizio	1,727	41.2
Republican	Robert A. Straniere (incumbent)	1,343	32.1
Republican	Mario Bruno	1,119	26.7
Total votes		4,189	100.0

2004 New York State Assembly election, District 62
Party	Candidate	Votes	%
Republican	Vincent M. Ignizio	26,649	64.7
Democratic	Emanule Innamorato	7,538	18.3
Independence	Robert A. Straniere	3,893	9.5
Working Families	Robert A. Straniere	1,131	2.7
Total	Robert A. Straniere (incumbent)	5,024	12.2
Conservative	Mario Bruno	1,952	4.7
Total votes		41,163	100.0
Republican hold			

== Notes ==
New York State Assembly
Preceded by Robert Straniere	New York State Assembly, 62nd district 2005–2007	Succeeded by Louis Tobacco
Preceded by Andrew Lanza	New York City Council, 51st district 2007–2015	Succeeded by Joseph Borelli
Preceded by James Oddo	Minority Leader, New York City Council; 2014–2015	Succeeded by Steven Matteo
Preceded by Dennis P. Gallagher	Minority Whip, New York City Council; 2008–2010	Succeeded by Eric Ulrich
Party political offices
Preceded by Robert J. Helbock Jr.	Chairman, Richmond County (New York) Republican Committee; 2006–2007	Succeeded by John S. Friscia
