= Louis Tobacco =

American politician

Lou Tobacco

Member of the New York State Assembly from the 62nd district
- In office March 2007 – December 31, 2012
- Preceded by: Vincent Ignizio
- Succeeded by: Joseph Borelli

Personal details
- Born: May 16, 1972 (age 54) Staten Island, New York, U.S.
- Party: Republican
- Spouse: Jennifer
- Children: 4
- Education: Rockefeller College of Public Affairs & Policy, SUNY Albany

Louis R. Tobacco (born May 16, 1972) is an American politician from New York. A Republican, he represented Staten Island's 62nd District as a Member of the New York State Assembly from 2007 through 2012.

== Early life, education, and career ==
Born in Staten Island, Tobacco attended Public School 35, St. Joseph Hill Academy Grammar School, and Monsignor Farrell High School, from which he graduated in 1990. He became an Eagle Scout in 1987.

He graduated from the Rockefeller College of Politics at State University of New York at Albany; while a student, he was an intern for State Assemblyman Robert Straniere and Congressman Guy Molinari as well as a summer intern for Molinari when he later served as Staten Island Borough president. In 1994, he was appointed by the borough president to serve as assistant director of contract oversight. He also represented Staten Island on the Mayor's Health and Human Services Planning Council, and was director of community relations from 1996 to 1997.

After leaving Borough Hall, he worked part-time until 2010 as a pharmaceutical sales representative, for Novartis and then for Pfizer.

After his retirement from the New York State Assembly in 2012, Tobacco worked for Staten Island University Hospital as director of surgical business development and later as associate executive director of community and government affairs. In 2019, he was appointed president and CEO of Monsignor Farrell High School.

== Political career ==
Tobacco's first run for political office was in 1996 for Staten Island's Mid-Island Assembly seat held by Assemblyman Eric Vitaliano. He was unsuccessful that year.

Tobacco was elected to represent the 62nd District in the New York State Assembly in a special election on March 27, 2007 to replace Vincent Ignizio, who resigned his seat to become a New York City Councilmember. He and fellow Staten Islander Nicole Malliotakis were the only Republicans in New York City's State Assembly delegation.

Tobacco served as the Ranking Minority Member of the Health Committee. He also served on the Ways and Means, Transportation, Cities, Codes, and Corporations, Authorities and Commissions committees. He was tapped to serve as vice chair of the Assembly Minority Sex Offender Watch Task Force and was appointed to the MTA Capital Program Review Board. He was known for his "Tobacco against tobacco" anti-smoking campaign as well as for criticizing the rising toll on the Verrazzano–Narrows Bridge and cuts to the mass transit budget for services to Staten Island residents; in winter 2009, he distributed thousands of "No Taxation Without Transportation" bumper stickers.

He retired from the Assembly in 2012 after serving three terms.

== Personal life ==
Lou Tobacco lives in the Tottenville section of Staten Island; he and his wife, Jennifer, have four children.

== Election results ==
- March 2007 special election, NYS Assembly, 62nd AD

Louis Tobacco (REP - ALBANY REFORM)	...	2,409
John S. Mulia (DEM - IND - CON)	...	1,008

- November 2008 general election, NYS Assembly, 62nd AD

Lou Tobacco (REP - IND - CON)	...	30,410
Albert J. Albanese (DEM)	...	11,816

- November 2010 general election, NYS Assembly, 62nd AD

Lou Tobacco (REP - IND - CON)	...	22,856
Albert J. Albanese (DEM)	...	6,179

New York State Assembly
Preceded by Vincent Ignizio	New York State Assembly, 62nd District; 2007–2012	Succeeded by Joseph Borelli
Party political offices
Preceded by Leticia M. Remauro	Republican nominee for New York State Assembly, 60th District; 1996	Succeeded by Glenn A. Yost
