= Michael Reilly (New York politician) =

American member of the New York State Assembly (born 1973)

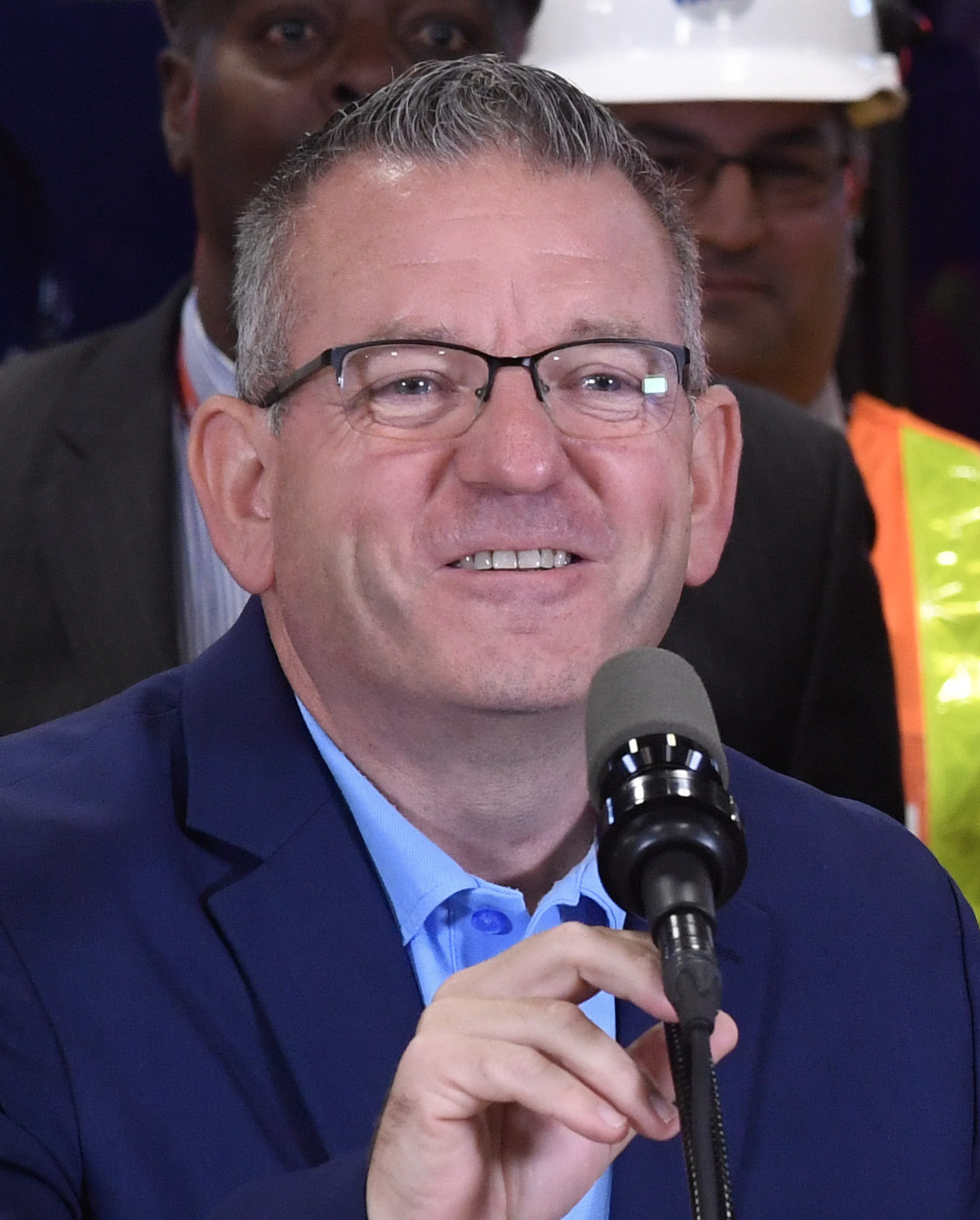

Member of the New York State Assembly from the 62nd district
- Incumbent
- Assumed office January 3, 2019
- Preceded by: Ronald Castorina

Personal details
- Born: January 30, 1973 (age 53) Staten Island, New York, U.S.
- Party: Republican
- Education: John Jay College (BS)
- Website: State Assembly website

Michael W. Reilly Jr. (born January 30, 1973) is a member of the New York State Assembly, representing the 62nd district since 2019. He is a Republican. The district includes portions of the South shore of Staten Island.

== Career ==
Reilly served in the United States Army Reserve and was an officer with the New York City Police Department. He previously served as the president of the Community Education Council (CEC) for District 31, which includes all of Staten Island.

In 2018, Republican Assemblyman Ronald Castorina opted to not seek re-election in order to run for a judgeship. Reilly, in a three-way primary, defeated his two opponents to claim the Republican nomination. He won the general election with nearly 90% of the vote.

As Assemblyman, Reilly has called for the front doors of academic buildings to be locked and for retired police officers to serve as supplemental school security.

Reilly has expressed support for the Divide NY plan, which would create three regions within the state. He has stated that Staten Island should become part of the upstate New York region; under the Divide NY plan, this region would be known as New Amsterdam.

== Personal life and education ==
Reilly has a BS in Legal Studies from John Jay College. He resides in Eltingville with his wife and family.

== Electoral history ==
=== 2026 ===
2026 New York State Assembly election, District 62
| Party | Candidate | Votes | % |
|---|---|---|---|
| Republican | Michael Reilly | | |
| Conservative | Michael Reilly | | |
| Total | Michael Reilly (incumbent) | | |
| Write-in | | | |
| Total votes | | | |

=== 2024 ===
2024 New York State Assembly election, District 62
| Party | Candidate | Votes | % |
|---|---|---|---|
| Republican | Michael Reilly (incumbent) | 53,553 | 90.6 |
| Conservative | Michael Reilly (incumbent) | 4,856 | 8.2 |
| Total | Michael Reilly (incumbent) | 58,409 | 98.8 |
| Write-in | | 696 | 1.2 |
| Total votes | | 59,105 | 100.0 |
| Republican hold | | | |

=== 2022 ===
2022 New York State Assembly election, District 62
| Party | Candidate | Votes | % |
|---|---|---|---|
| Republican | Michael Reilly (incumbent) | 39,172 | 91.8 |
| Conservative | Michael Reilly (incumbent) | 3,098 | 7.3 |
| Total | Michael Reilly (incumbent) | 42,270 | 99.1 |
| Write-in | | 403 | 0.9 |
| Total votes | | 42,673 | 100.0 |
| Republican hold | | | |

=== 2020 ===
2020 New York State Assembly election, District 62
| Party | Candidate | Votes | % |
|---|---|---|---|
| Republican | Michael Reilly (incumbent) | 50,712 | 89.9 |
| Conservative | Michael Reilly (incumbent) | 5,241 | 9.3 |
| Total | Michael Reilly (incumbent) | 55,953 | 99.2 |
| Write-in | | 477 | 0.8 |
| Total votes | | 56,430 | 100.0 |
| Republican hold | | | |

=== 2018 ===
2018 New York State Assembly Republican primary, District 62
| Party | Candidate | Votes | % |
|---|---|---|---|
| Republican | Michael Reilly | 3,374 | 64.3 |
| Republican | Glenn A. Yost | 1,372 | 26.1 |
| Republican | Ashley F. Zanatta | 463 | 8.8 |
| Write-in | | 41 | 0.8 |
| Total votes | | 5,250 | 100.0 |

2018 New York State Assembly election, District 62
| Party | Candidate | Votes | % |
|---|---|---|---|
| Republican | Michael Reilly | 28,533 | 80.9 |
| Conservative | Michael Reilly | 2,949 | 8.4 |
| Total | Michael Reilly | 31,482 | 89.3 |
| Reform | Glenn A. Yost | 3,484 | 9.9 |
| Write-in | | 285 | 0.8 |
| Total votes | | 35,251 | 100.0 |
| Republican hold | | | |
