= Seguine Mansion =

Historic house in Staten Island, New York

- Seguine House
- U.S. National Register of Historic Places
- New York City Landmark
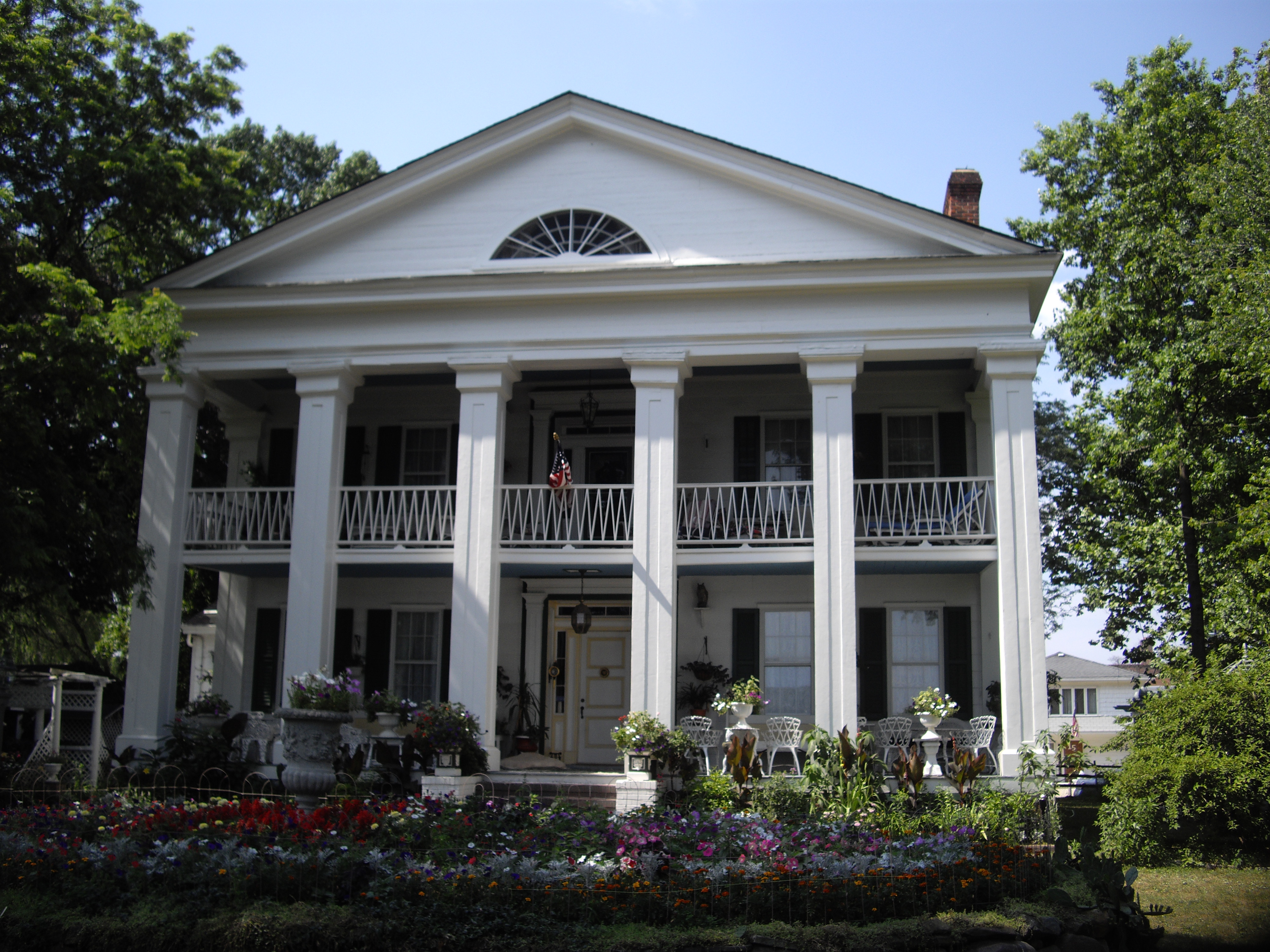
- Seguine-Burke Mansion

- Location within New York City Location within New York Location within the United States
- Location: 440 Seguine Ave, Staten Island, New York
- Coordinates: 40°30′54.79″N 74°11′51.11″W
- Built: 1838
- Architectural style: Greek Revival
- Website: http://www.seguinemansion.org
- NRHP reference No.: 80002761
- NYCL No.: 0389

Significant dates
- Added to NRHP: May 6, 1980
- Designated NYCL: May 25, 1967

The Seguine Mansion, also known as the Seguine-Burke Mansion, is located on Lemon Creek near the southern shore of Staten Island, New York City. The Greek Revival house is one of the few surviving examples of 19th-century life on Staten Island. It is listed on the National Register of Historic Places and is a member of the Historic House Trust.

James Seguine is believed to have purchased property near Lemon Creek between 1780 and 1786, and his grandson Joseph H. Seguine built the house on the property in 1838. At the time, he added a hay barn, carriage house and stables. Joseph was a prominent businessman in the area, founding several companies including the Staten Island Railroad company. He died in 1856. In 1868, the family was forced to sell the house and land. In 1916, descendants were able to repurchase the house and it remained in the family until 1981.

In 1981, the house was in serious need of repair, and was sold to George Burke, who had previously restored other historic buildings in the community. Burke not only saved the building but also ensured that the property would not be subdivided. The renovation of the outside of the house took more than five years and sixty gallons of paint. Burke filled the house with his elaborate collection of art and furnishings, many acquired during his years in England after World War II, while he was in the Air Force. After restoring the house and establishing an equestrian center at the site, Burke donated the Seguine Mansion to the City of New York in 1989, and retains a life interest in the site.

The New York City Parks Department owns the house. Tours are scheduled by Friends of the Seguine Mansion, by appointment only. The Friends of Seguine Mansion is a not-for-profit 501(c)(3) organization formed for the purpose to own, operate, manage, and do everything normally associated with conducting the business of fund-raising for the care and maintenance of the Seguine Mansion residence and grounds, together with the power to solicit grants and contributions for the corporate purposes.

== See also ==
- List of New York City Designated Landmarks in Staten Island
- National Register of Historic Places listings in Richmond County, New York
