= Joe Borelli =

American politician

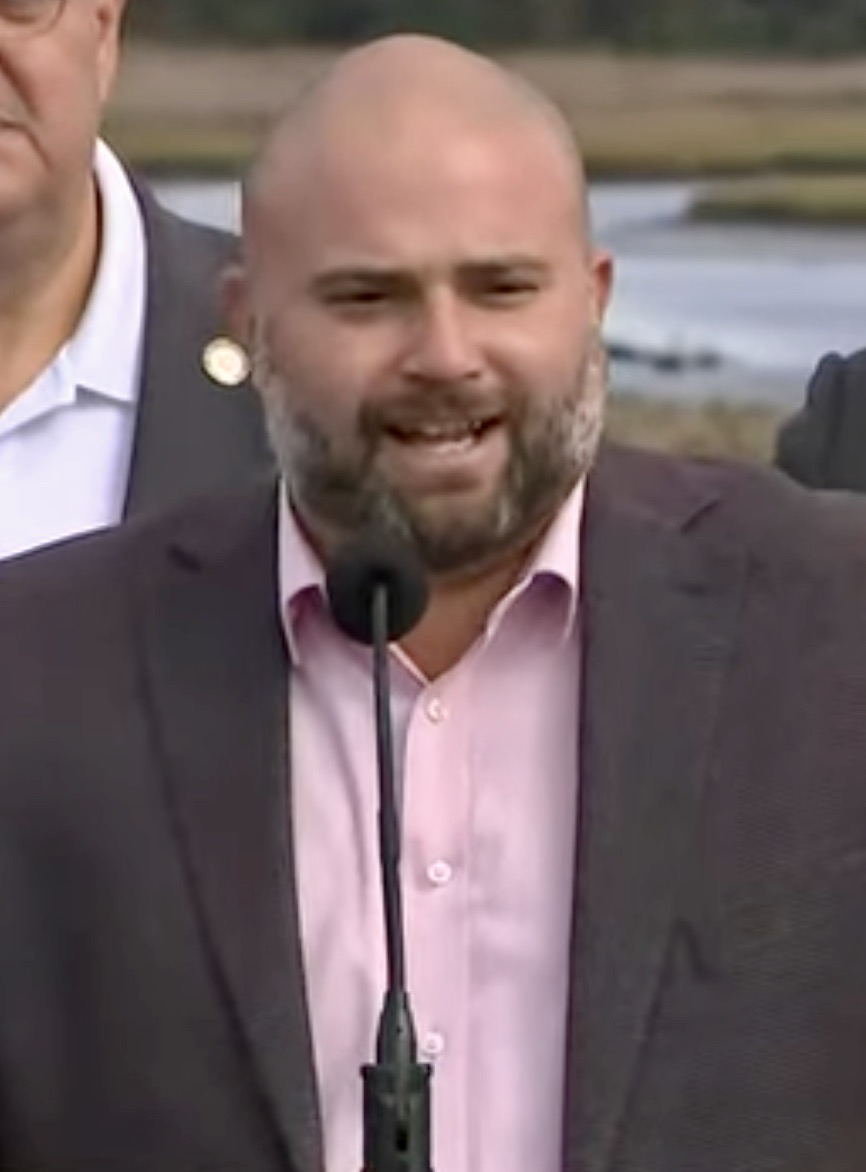
- Borelli in 2023

Minority Leader of the New York City Council
- In office November 17, 2021 – January 31, 2025
- Preceded by: Steven Matteo
- Succeeded by: David Carr

Member of the New York City Council from the 51st district
- In office November 30, 2015 – January 31, 2025
- Preceded by: Vincent Ignizio
- Succeeded by: Frank Morano

Member of the New York State Assembly from the 62nd district
- In office January 1, 2013 – November 30, 2015
- Preceded by: Louis Tobacco
- Succeeded by: Ronald Castorina

Personal details
- Born: Joseph Charles Borelli; July 27, 1982 (age 43) New York City, New York, U.S.
- Party: Republican
- Education: Marist College (BA); College of Staten Island (MA)
- Website: Campaign website

Joseph Charles Borelli (born July 27, 1982) is an American politician who was formerly the Minority Leader of the New York City Council. In the Council, he represented the 51st District, which encompasses much of the South Shore of Staten Island. He is a Republican and a staunch supporter of Donald Trump. He now works as a political consultant for Chartwell Strategy Group.

== Early life, education, and career ==
Borelli was born in Staten Island and adopted at birth by the Borelli family. He attended Public School 4, Our Lady Star of the Sea Grammar School, and St. Joseph by-the-Sea High School, from which he graduated in 2000.

After graduating from Marist College, he worked on the campaign of Vincent Ignizio, who was elected to the New York State Assembly from the 62nd District. He became Chief-of-Staff to the then-Assemblyman, and continued in that role when Ignizio was elected to the New York City Council in February 2007.

== Political career ==
Borelli was elected on November 6, 2012, to the State Assembly to succeed the retiring Louis Tobacco. He was one of only two Republicans in New York City's State Assembly delegation.

On November 3, 2015, Borelli won a special election to replace fellow Republican Vincent Ignizio on the City Council and was chosen to be the Council's Minority Whip.

In 2016, Borelli frequently appeared on national cable TV news shows where he supported Donald Trump as the Republican Presidential nominee. Borelli also co-chaired Trump's campaign during the 2016 New York Republican primary. Trump later won New York's primary with 59% of the vote, and he went on to win the Republican nomination and later the general election. The following year, Borelli was re-elected in the New York City Council elections, 2017, winning 80% of the vote.

In 2019, Borelli was the Republican and Conservative Party nominee for NYC Public Advocate, running against Democratic incumbent Jumaane Williams. Williams won the race garnering 77.9 percent of the vote to Borelli's 20%. In 2019, New York State Republican Chairman Nick Langworthy named Borelli as a spokesman to help spread the New York GOP's message during the 2020 election cycle.

On November 17, 2021, Borelli was elected as Minority Leader of the City Council's Republican delegation, replacing outgoing Council Member Steven Matteo.

In 2022, Borelli criticized the planned implementation of congestion pricing to the most crowded areas of Manhattan. Congestion pricing eventually went into effect in January 2025.

In 2024, Borelli introduced a bill to revoke New York City's status as a sanctuary city. He stated that "sanctuary city policy is a social experiment gone off the rails."

In January 2025, Borelli resigned from the City Council, about a year before he would have been required to leave office due to term limits. He took a position in the private sector, joining Chartwell Strategy Group, a political consulting firm. Borelli became the first Managing Director of the firm's recently opened New York City office.

== Personal life ==
Borelli lives in the Annadale neighborhood of Staten Island, with his wife and their two sons.

== Electoral history ==
=== 2023 ===
2023 New York City Council election, District 51
Party	Candidate	Votes	%
Republican	Joe Borelli	8,519	81.5
Conservative	Joe Borelli	1,589	15.2
Total	Joe Borelli (incumbent)	10,108	96.7
Write-in		342	3.3
Total votes		10,450	100.0
Republican hold			

=== 2021 ===
2021 New York City Council election, District 51
Party	Candidate	Votes	%
Republican	Joe Borelli	31,621	77.3
Conservative	Joe Borelli	2,630	6.4
Total	Joe Borelli (incumbent)	34,251	83.7
Democratic	Olivia Johanna Drabczyk	6,628	16.2
Write-in		26	0.1
Total votes		40,905	100.0
Republican hold			

2021 New York City Council minority leader election * denotes incumbent
Party	Candidate	Votes	%
Republican	Joe Borelli (District 51)	3 (Note: The three votes for Borelli were cast by Borelli himself, Steven Matteo, and Eric Ulrich.)	100.0
Total votes		3	100.0
Votes necessary		2	>50.0

=== 2019 ===
2019 New York City Public Advocate election
Party	Candidate	Votes	%
Democratic	Jumaane Williams (incumbent)	607,441	77.9
Republican	Joe Borelli	132,883	17.0
Conservative	Joe Borelli	22,734	3.0
Total	Joe Borelli	155,617	19.9
Libertarian	Devin Balkind	15,676	2.0
Write-in		1,461	0.2
Total votes		780,195	100.0
Democratic hold			

=== 2017 ===
2017 New York City Council election, District 51
Party	Candidate	Votes	%
Republican	Joe Borelli	25,184	68.3
Conservative	Joe Borelli	3,690	10.0
Independence	Joe Borelli	498	1.4
Reform	Joe Borelli	154	0.4
Total	Joe Borelli (incumbent)	29,526	80.1
Democratic	Dylan M. Schwartz	6,692	18.1
Working Families	Dylan M. Schwartz	579	1.6
Total	Dylan M. Schwartz	7,271	19.7
Write-in		77	0.2
Total votes		36,874	100.0
Republican hold			

=== 2016 ===
2016 New York City Council election, District 51
Party	Candidate	Votes	%
Republican	Joe Borelli	45,158	84.0
Conservative	Joe Borelli	4,644	8.6
Independence	Joe Borelli	3,550	6.6
Total	Joe Borelli (incumbent)	53,352	99.3
Write-in		376	0.7
Total votes		53,728	100.0
Republican hold			

=== 2015 ===
2015 New York City's 51st City Council District special election
Party	Candidate	Votes	%
South Shore First	Joe Borelli	9,111	97.9
Write-in		198	2.1
Total votes		9,309	100.0
Republican hold			

=== 2014 ===
2014 New York State Assembly election, District 62
Party	Candidate	Votes	%
Republican	Joe Borelli	15,914	79.2
Conservative	Joe Borelli	2,406	12.0
Independence	Joe Borelli	1,608	8.0
Total	Joe Borelli (incumbent)	19,928	99.1
Write-in		172	0.9
Total votes		20,100	100.0
Republican hold			

=== 2012 ===
2012 New York State Assembly election, District 62
Party	Candidate	Votes	%
Republican	Joe Borelli	25,279	60.2
Conservative	Joe Borelli	2,873	6.8
Independence	Joe Borelli	874	2.1
Total	Joe Borelli	29,026	69.1
Democratic	Anthony A. Mascolo	12,943	30.8
Write-in		37	0.1
Total votes		42,006	100.0
Republican hold			
