= St. Joseph by the Sea High School =

St. Joseph by-the-Sea High School

Location
- 5150 Hylan Boulevard; Staten Island, New York 10312; United States; 40°31′32″N 74°10′36″W

Information
- Type: Private, coeducational
- Motto: Ipsius Est Mare (The Sea is His)
- Religious affiliation: Roman Catholic
- Patron saint: Saint Joseph
- Established: 1963
- CEEB code: 335-383
- Principal: Michael Reilly
- Faculty: 55
- Grades: 9-12
- Student to teacher ratio: 23:1
- Colors: Blue and gray
- Sports: Baseball, basketball, bowling, cheerleading, cross country, track & field, football, golf, hockey, lacrosse, soccer, softball, swimming, tennis, volleyball, wrestling, sailing, archery, fencing, dance
- Nickname: Vikings
- Accreditation: Middle States Association of Colleges and Schools
- Newspaper: The Viking Press
- Yearbook: SAGA
- Website: josephsea.org

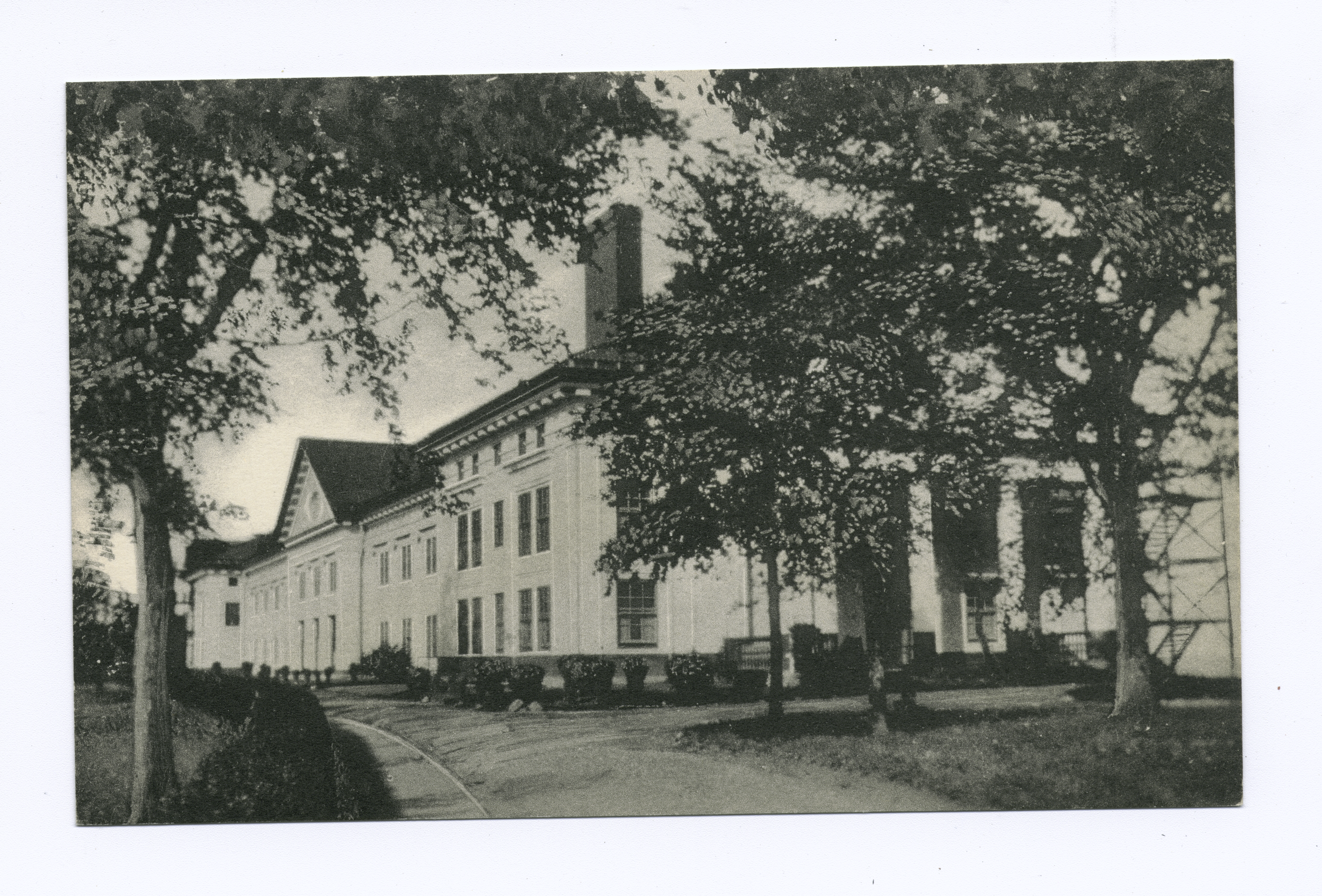
St. Joseph's House and Colonnade (NYPL b15279351-104988)

St. Joseph by-the-Sea High School (also known as SJS or Sea) is a co-educational Catholic school in the Huguenot neighborhood of Staten Island, New York. It is an independent school with its own board of trustees. The school serves approximately 1,200 students in 9th, 10th, 11th and 12th grades.

== Founding ==
The school property was previously owned by steel magnate Charles M. Schwab, who was developing it as a summer resort. In 1909, he donated it to the Sisters of Charity of New York, as a seaside home for children from the New York Foundling hospital. Then after many years as a children's home and a convent, the Sisters transformed the property into a high school, first for girls in 1963, then co-educational since 1973.

== Notable alumni ==
- Joseph Borelli, former New York City Council member
- Sheena Colette, actress
- Pete Davidson, comedian, actor
- Matt Festa, baseball player
- Ollie Ogbu (2005), NFL/CFL professional football player, Hudson Valley Fort
- Luke Pensabene, actor and film producer
- Chris Terrio, screenwriter and academy award winner
