= Robert A. Straniere =

American politician

Robert Alan Straniere

Member of the New York State Assembly
- In office January 1, 1981 – December 31, 2004
- Preceded by: Guy Molinari
- Succeeded by: Vincent M. Ignizio
- Constituency: 60th district (1981-1992); 61st district (1993-2002); 62nd district (2003-2004)

Personal details
- Born: March 28, 1941 (age 85) New York City, New York, U.S.
- Party: Republican
- Spouse: Ruth Straniere
- Education: Wagner College; New York University School of Law
- Profession: Politician

Robert Alan Straniere (born March 28, 1941) is a Republican politician from New York City. He represented a district in Staten Island in the New York State Assembly from 1981 until 2004, serving as the Assistant Minority Leader from 1995 until 2004. In the 2008 Congressional election, he was a candidate for the House of Representatives in New York's 13th congressional district, a seat being vacated by Vito Fossella. Straniere received the endorsement of the Staten Island Republican Party. On September 9, 2008, Staniere defeated Dr. Jamshad I. Wyne in the Republican primary to become the Republican candidate. He opposed the winner of the Democratic primary, Michael E. McMahon, a member of the New York City Council. McMahon won the election on November 4.

Born in Manhattan and raised in Staten Island, Straniere received his bachelor's degree from Wagner College in 1962, and attended New York University Law School, where he was awarded a Juris Doctor degree in 1965. He joined the New York Army National Guard in 1966, and returned to NYU Law School, where he was awarded a Master of Laws degree in 1969. He then served as Counsel to New York State Senator John J. Marchi from 1970 until 1980, when he ran for the New York State Assembly seat which was being vacated by Guy Molinari. He won the election and served in the Assembly until 2004, sitting in the 184th, 185th, 186th, 187th, 188th, 189th, 190th, 191st, 192nd, 193rd, 194th and 195th New York State Legislatures. For the last 10 years he was Assistant Minority Leader. In 2004, he ran for re-nomination, but was defeated by Vincent M. Ignizio in the Republican primary.

After his re-election defeat, Straniere moved to Manhattan and in April 2007 he opened up a restaurant at the corner of Chambers and Church Streets in Tribeca called the New York City Hot Dog Company. Straniere remains involved in New York City politics as an analyst and radio commentator.

New York State Assembly
Preceded by Guy Molinari	New York State Assembly; 60th District; 1981–1992	Succeeded by Eric N. Vitaliano
Preceded by Deborah Glick	New York State Assembly; 61st District; 1993–2002	Succeeded by John W. Lavelle
Preceded by Sheldon Silver	New York State Assembly; 62nd District; 2003–2004	Succeeded by Vincent M. Ignizio
Party political offices
Preceded by George T. Hartigan	Independence Party nominee for Borough President of Staten Island; 2001	Succeeded by John V. Luisi
