= 2018 United States House of Representatives elections in New York =

- November 6, 2018

All 27 New York seats to the United States House of Representatives
	Majority party	Minority party
Party	Democratic	Republican
Last election	18	9
Seats won	21	6
Seat change	▲3	▼3
Popular vote	3,990,483	1,855,147
Percentage	67.16%	31.22%
Swing	▲4.35%	▼4.37%

Democratic hold Democratic gain
Republican hold
Democratic
40–50%
50–60%
60–70%
70–80%
80–90%
90–100%
Republican
40–50%
50–60%
60–70%

The 2018 United States House of Representatives elections in New York were held November 6, 2018 to elect a U.S. Representative from each of New York's 27 congressional districts. The elections coincided with the gubernatorial election, as well as an election to the United States Senate and various state and local elections.

Contested primaries were held June 26, 2018. On election day, Democrats gained three New York House seats, and the Democratic Party retook control of the House of Representatives. Democrats won a total of 21 New York House seats, while Republicans won six.

== Overview ==
Elections were held in all 27 of New York's congressional districts in 2018. Prior to the 2018 elections, one New York House seat was vacant due to the death of Rep. Louise Slaughter (D-25th District) on March 16, 2018. In the June 26, 2018 Democratic primary in District 14, insurgent Alexandria Ocasio-Cortez upset longtime incumbent Rep. Joe Crowley. On November 6, 2018, the Democratic Party held the open seat in District 25 and defeated three Republican incumbents; with the exception of Crowley, all Democratic incumbent members of Congress in New York were re-elected. The defeated Republican incumbents were Rep. Dan Donovan (R-11th District) (defeated by Democrat Max Rose), Rep. John Faso (R-19th District) (defeated by Democrat Antonio Delgado), and Rep. Claudia Tenney (R-22nd District) (defeated by Democrat Anthony Brindisi). Incumbent Rep. Chris Collins (R-27th District) was narrowly re-elected despite having been arrested on insider trading charges in August 2018.

Democrats won a total of 21 New York House seats, while Republicans won six. Nationally, the Democratic Party won control of the House of Representatives on election day.

New York is near unique among the states in that it allows electoral fusion (cross-endorsement). As a result, New York ballots tend to list many political parties. Most news outlets report election results using only the primary affiliation of party registration of candidates rather than by the party nominees who are elected, and most pollsters group candidates the same way.

United States House of Representatives elections in New York, 2018
Party	Votes	Percentage	Seats	+/–
Democratic	3,760,566	63.30%	21	+3
Republican	1,639,593	27.60%	6	–3
Conservative	207,094	3.49%	0	
Working Families	176,483	2.97%	0	
Reform	44,931	0.76%	0	
Independence	44,722	0.75%	0	
Women's Equality	41,317	0.70%	0	
Independent	2,835	0.05%	0	
Totals	5,917,541	100.00%	27	

Popular vote
Democratic	63.30%
Republican	27.60%
Other	9.10%

House seats by party nomination
Democratic	77.78%
Working Families	66.67%
Women's Equality	40.74%
Independence	37.04%
Reform	29.63%
Conservative	22.22%
Republican	22.22%

House seats by party registration
Democratic	77.78%
Republican	22.22%

=== By district ===
Results of the 2018 United States House of Representatives elections in New York by district:

District	Democratic		Republican		Others		Total	Result
District	Votes	%	Votes	%	Votes	%	Votes	Result
District 1	127,991	47.40%	139,027	51.49%	2,988	1.11%	270,006	Republican hold
District 2	113,074	46.89%	128,078	53.11%	0	0.00%	241,152	Republican hold
District 3	157,456	58.98%	109,514	41.02%	0	0.00%	266,970	Democratic hold
District 4	159,535	61.33%	100,571	38.67%	0	0.00%	260,106	Democratic hold
District 5	160,500	100.00%	0	0.00%	0	0.00%	160,500	Democratic hold
District 6	111,646	90.88%	0	0.00%	11,209	9.12%	122,855	Democratic hold
District 7	146,687	93.37%	0	0.00%	10,410	6.63%	157,097	Democratic hold
District 8	180,376	94.24%	0	0.00%	11,028	5.76%	263,307	Democratic hold
District 9	181,455	89.33%	20,901	10.29%	779	0.38%	203,135	Democratic hold
District 10	173,095	82.15%	37,619	17.85%	0	0.00%	210,714	Democratic hold
District 11	101,823	53.02%	89,441	46.58%	774	0.40%	192,038	Democratic gain
District 12	217,430	86.42%	30,446	12.10%	3,728	1.48%	251,604	Democratic hold
District 13	180,035	94.60%	10,268	5.40%	0	0.00%	190,303	Democratic hold
District 14	110,318	78.17%	19,202	13.61%	11,602	8.22%	141,122	Democratic hold
District 15	124,469	95.99%	5,205	4.01%	0	0.00%	129,674	Democratic hold
District 16	182,044	100.00%	0	0.00%	0	0.00%	182,044	Democratic hold
District 17	170,168	88.02%	0	0.00%	23,150	11.98%	193,318	Democratic hold
District 18	139,564	55.47%	112,035	44.53%	0	0.00%	251,599	Democratic hold
District 19	147,873	51.37%	132,873	46.15%	7,148	2.48%	287,894	Democratic gain
District 20	176,811	66.50%	89,058	33.50%	0	0.00%	265,869	Democratic hold
District 21	99,791	42.43%	131,981	56.11%	3,437	1.46%	235,209	Republican hold
District 22	127,715	50.89%	123,242	49.11%	0	0.00%	250,957	Democratic gain
District 23	109,932	45.76%	130,323	54.24%	0	0.00%	279,327	Republican hold
District 24	123,226	47.37%	136,920	52.63%	0	0.00%	260,146	Republican hold
District 25	159,244	58.98%	110,736	41.02%	0	0.00%	269,980	Democratic hold
District 26	169,166	73.34%	61,488	26.66%	0	0.00%	230,654	Democratic hold
District 27	139,059	48.76%	140,146	49.14%	5,973	2.10%	285,178	Republican hold
Total	3,990,483	65.93%	1,859,074	30.72%	92,226	1.52%	6,052,758	

== District 1 ==
2018 New York's 1st congressional district election
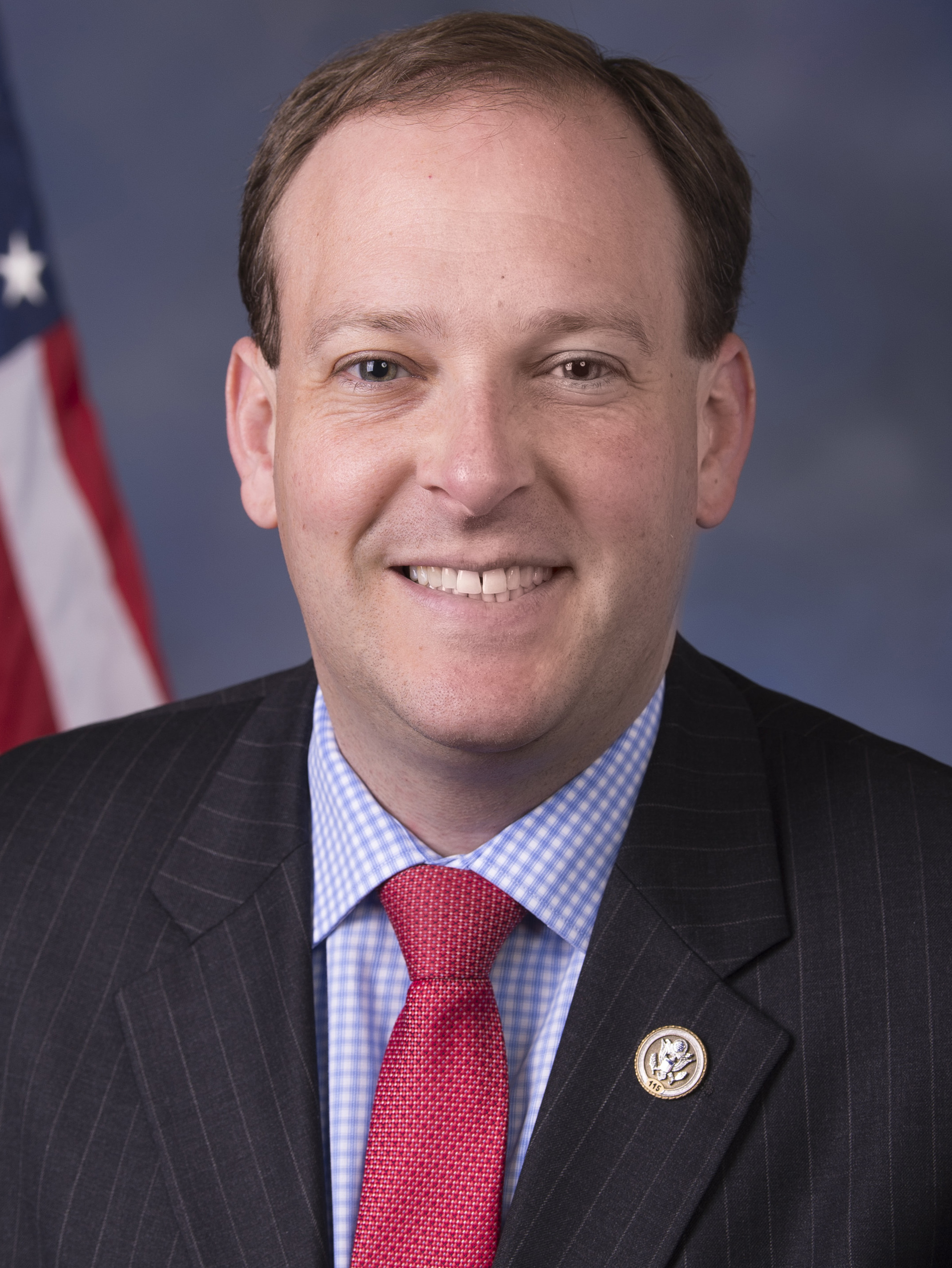

	Majority party	Minority party
Candidate	Lee Zeldin	Perry Gershon
Party	Republican	Democratic
Alliance	Independence; Conservative; Reform	Working Families
Popular vote	139,027	127,991
Percentage	51.5%	47.4%
- County results Zeldin: 50–60%
U.S. Representative before election
Lee Zeldin
Republican
Elected U.S. Representative
Lee Zeldin
Republican

The 1st district is located in eastern Long Island and includes most of central and eastern Suffolk County. The incumbent was Republican Lee Zeldin, who had represented the district since 2015. He was re-elected to a second term with 58% of the vote in 2016.

=== Republican primary ===
==== Candidates ====
===== Nominee =====
- Lee Zeldin, incumbent U.S. Representative

=== Democratic primary ===
The 1st district was included on the initial list of Republican-held seats being targeted by the Democratic Congressional Campaign Committee in 2018.

==== Candidates ====
===== Nominee =====
- Perry Gershon, businessman

===== Eliminated in primary =====
- Kate Browning, Suffolk County legislator
- Elaine DiMasi, physicist
- David Pechefsky, New York City Council staffer
- Vivian Viloria-Fisher, former Suffolk County legislator and candidate for Brookhaven Town Supervisor in 2013

===== Withdrawn =====
- Brendon Henry, bartender
- Hannah Selinger, writer and sommelier

===== Declined =====
- Dave Calone, venture capitalist, former chairman of the Suffolk Planning Commission and candidate in 2016
- Fred Thiele, state assembly member

==== Results ====
Democratic primary results
Party	Candidate	Votes	%
Democratic	Perry Gershon	7,902	35.5
Democratic	Kate Browning	6,813	30.6
Democratic	Vivian Viloria-Fisher	3,616	16.3
Democratic	David Pechefsky	2,565	11.5
Democratic	Elaine DiMasi	1,344	6.0
Total votes		22,240	100.0

=== General election ===
==== Predictions ====
Source	Ranking	As of
The Cook Political Report	Likely R	November 5, 2018
Inside Elections	Safe R	November 5, 2018
Sabato's Crystal Ball	Lean R	November 5, 2018
RCP	Lean R	November 5, 2018
Daily Kos	Likely R	November 5, 2018
538	Likely R	November 7, 2018

==== Campaign ====
In mid-September, Gershon said his campaign had raised more than $1.25 million since July 1, with contributions averaging $85. At the end of September, the nonpartisan Washington, D.C.-based Cook Political Report rated the race as "Likely Republican;" the "Likely" designation is for seats "not considered competitive at this point, but hav[ing] the potential to become engaged."

==== Endorsements ====
Lee Zeldin (R)

Executive branch officials

- Donald Trump, president of the United States (2017–2021)

Labor unions

- Transport Workers Union of America Local 252

Organizations

- NRA Political Victory Fund

Newspapers

- The New York Post
Perry Gershon (D)

Labor unions

- New York State United Teachers
- SEIU 32BJ

Organizations

- Giffords
- Human Rights Campaign

Newspapers

- The New York Times
- Newsday

==== Polling ====
Poll source	Date(s) administered	Sample size	Margin of error	Lee Zeldin (R)	Perry Gershon (D)	Undecided
Change Research (D)	October 27–29, 2018	838	–	52%	37%	–
GBA Strategies (D-Gershon)	October 8–10, 2018	500	± 4.4%	50%	46%	–
NYT Upshot/Siena College	October 4–8, 2018	502	± 4.6%	49%	41%	10%
Global Strategy Group (D)	September 11–17, 2018	400	± 4.9%	47%	44%	–

==== Results ====
New York's 1st congressional district, 2018
Party	Candidate	Votes	%
Republican	Lee Zeldin	121,562	45.0
Conservative	Lee Zeldin	14,284	5.3
Independence	Lee Zeldin	2,693	1.0
Reform	Lee Zeldin	488	0.2
Total	Lee Zeldin (incumbent)	139,027	51.5
Democratic	Perry Gershon	124,213	46.0
Working Families	Perry Gershon	3,778	1.4
Total	Perry Gershon	127,991	47.4
Women's Equality	Kate Browning	2,988	1.1
Total votes		270,006	100.0
Republican hold			

== District 2 ==
2018 New York's 2nd congressional district election
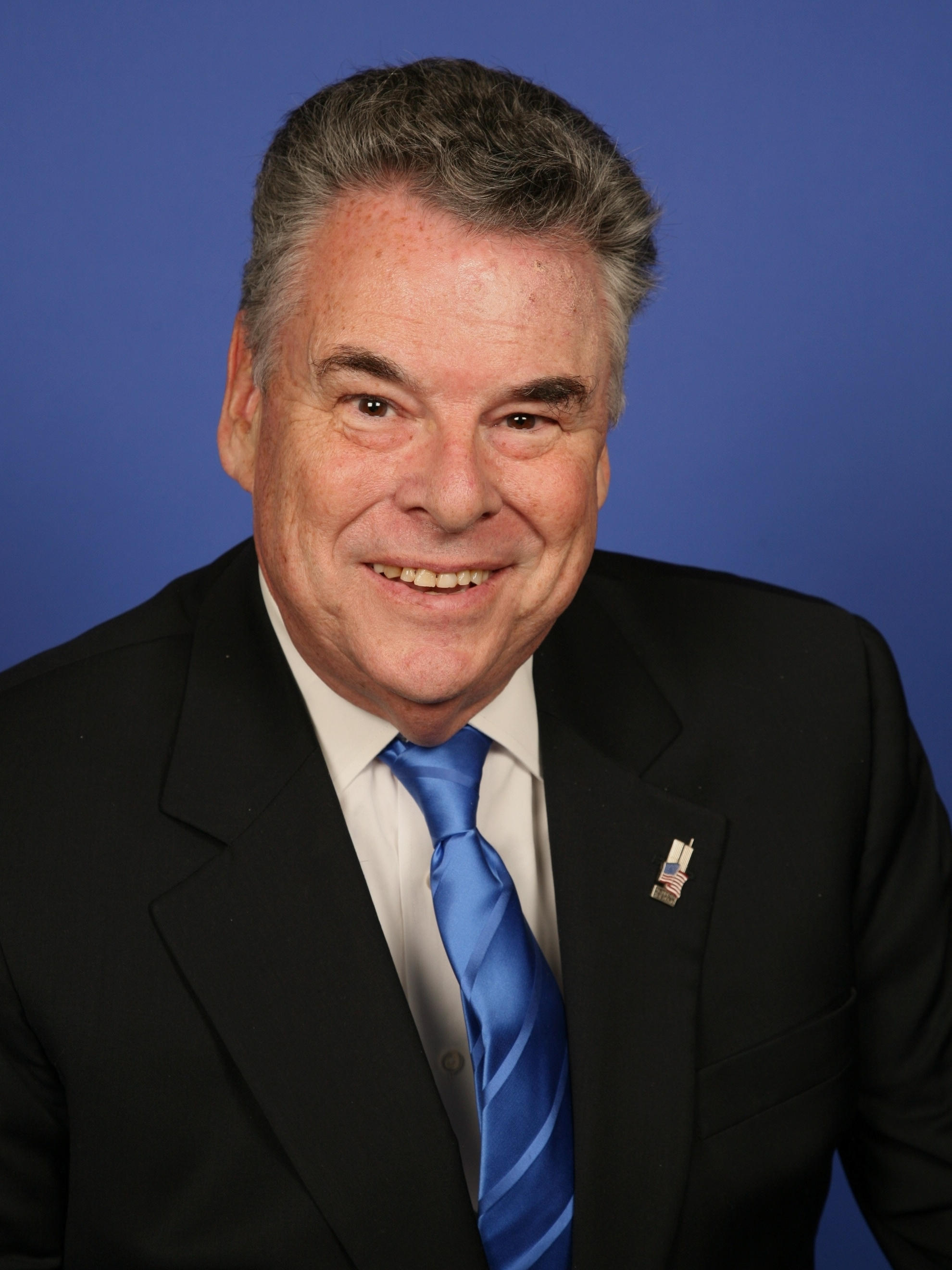

	Majority party	Minority party
Candidate	Peter T. King	Liuba Grechen Shirley
Party	Republican	Democratic
Alliance	Independence; Conservative; Reform	Working Families; Women's Equality
Popular vote	128,078	113,074
Percentage	53.1%	46.9%
- County results King: 60–70% Shirley: 50–60%
U.S. Representative before election
Peter T. King
Republican
Elected U.S. Representative
Peter T. King
Republican

The 2nd district is based along the South Shore of Long Island and includes southwestern Suffolk County and a small portion of southeastern Nassau County. The incumbent was Republican Peter T. King, who had represented the district since 2013 and previously represented the 3rd district from 1993 to 2013. He was re-elected to a thirteenth term with 62% of the vote in 2016.

=== Republican primary ===
==== Candidates ====
===== Nominee =====
- Peter T. King, incumbent U.S. Representative

=== Democratic primary ===
==== Candidates ====
===== Nominee =====
- Liuba Grechen Shirley, teacher

===== Eliminated in primary =====
- DuWayne Gregory, Suffolk County legislator

==== Results ====
Democratic primary results
Party	Candidate	Votes	%
Democratic	Liuba Grechen Shirley	7,315	57.3
Democratic	DuWayne Gregory	5,456	42.7
Total votes		12,771	100.0

=== General election ===
==== Predictions ====
Source	Ranking	As of
The Cook Political Report	Likely R	November 5, 2018
Inside Elections	Safe R	November 5, 2018
Sabato's Crystal Ball	Likely R	November 5, 2018
RCP	Likely R	November 5, 2018
Daily Kos	Safe R	November 5, 2018
538	Lean R	November 7, 2018

==== Endorsements ====
Peter King (R)

Executive branch officials

- Donald Trump, president of the United States (2017–2021)

Organizations

- Humane Society of the United States

Newspapers

- The New York Post
- Newsday
Liuba Grechen Shirley (D)

U.S. representatives

- Kathleen Rice, NY-04 (2015–2023)

Statewide officials

- Andrew Cuomo, governor of New York (2011–2021)

Labor unions

- New York State United Teachers
- SEIU 32BJ

Organizations

- EMILY's List
- Indivisible

Newspapers

- The New York Times

==== Debate ====
2018 New York's 2nd congressional district debate
No.	Date	Host	Moderator	Link	Republican	Democratic
Key: P Participant A Absent N Not invited I Invited W Withdrawn						
Key: P Participant A Absent N Not invited I Invited W Withdrawn					Peter King	Liuba Grechen Shirley
1	Oct. 18, 2018	WRNN-TV	Richard French		P	P

==== Results ====
New York's 2nd congressional district, 2018
Party	Candidate	Votes	%
Republican	Peter T. King	112,565	46.7
Conservative	Peter T. King	12,504	5.2
Independence	Peter T. King	2,535	1.0
Reform	Peter T. King	474	0.2
Total	Peter T. King (incumbent)	128,078	53.1
Democratic	Liuba Grechen Shirley	108,803	45.1
Working Families	Liuba Grechen Shirley	2,799	1.2
Women's Equality	Liuba Grechen Shirley	1,472	0.6
Total	Liuba Grechen Shirley	113,074	46.9
Total votes		241,152	100.0
Republican hold			

== District 3 ==
2018 New York's 3rd congressional district election
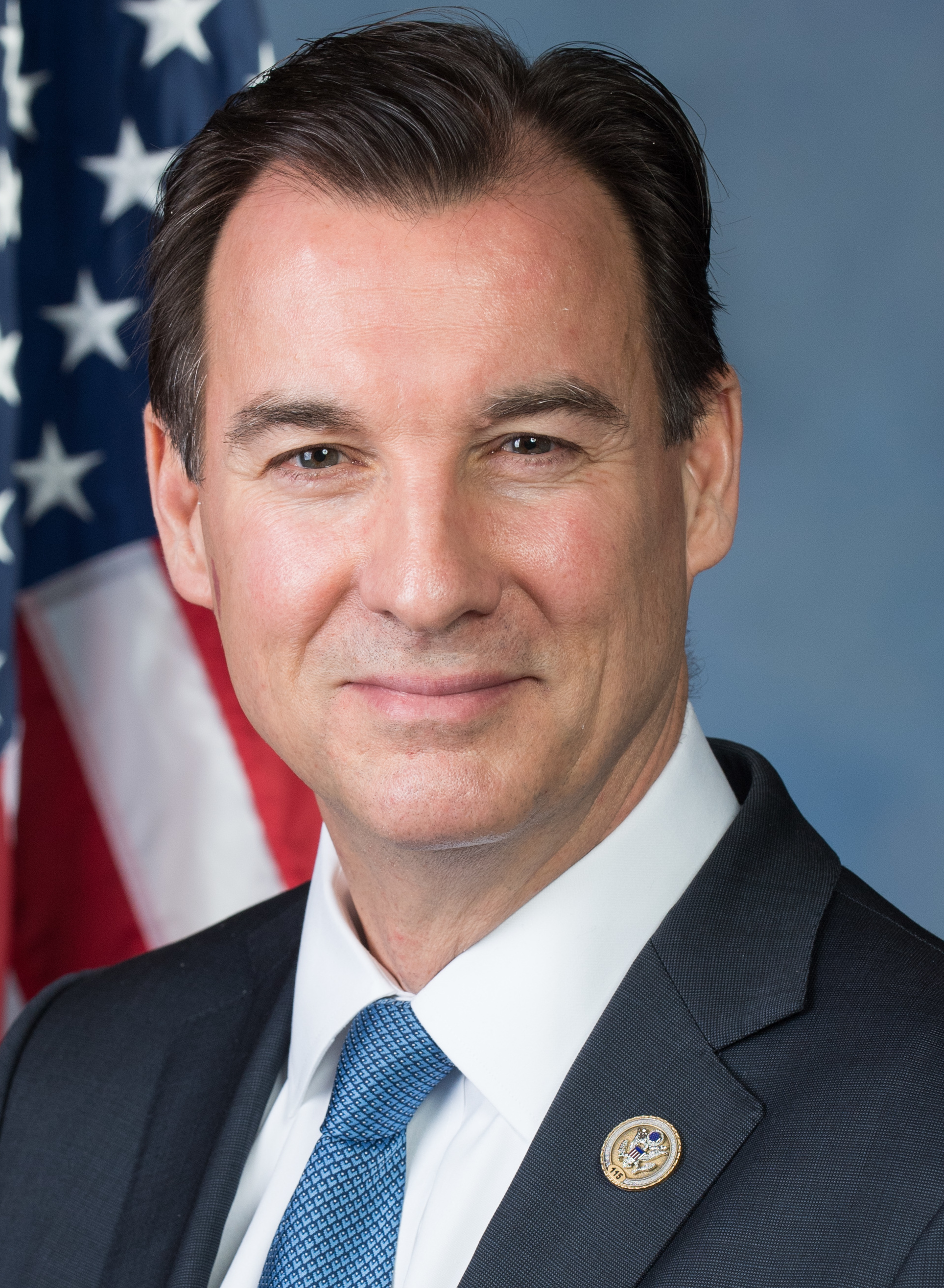

Nominee	Tom Suozzi	Dan DeBono
Party	Democratic	Republican
Alliance	Independence; Working Families; Women's Equality; Reform	Conservative
Popular vote	157,456	109,514
Percentage	59.0%	41.0%
- County results Suozzi: 50–60% 60–70%
U.S. Representative before election
Tom Suozzi
Democratic
Elected U.S. Representative
Tom Suozzi
Democratic

The 3rd district includes most of the North Shore of Long Island. It covers northwestern Suffolk County, northern Nassau County, and northeastern Queens. The incumbent was Democrat Tom Suozzi, who had represented the district since 2017. He was elected to replace retiring representative Steve Israel with 53% of the vote in 2016.

=== Democratic primary ===
==== Candidates ====
===== Nominee =====
- Tom Suozzi, incumbent U.S. Representative

=== Republican primary ===
New York's 3rd district was included on the initial list of Democrat-held seats being targeted by the National Republican Congressional Committee in 2018.

==== Candidates ====
===== Nominee =====
- Dan DeBono, investment banker

=== Independents ===
- Joshua Sauberman, policy analyst

=== General election ===
==== Predictions ====
Source	Ranking	As of
The Cook Political Report	Safe D	November 5, 2018
Inside Elections	Safe D	November 5, 2018
Sabato's Crystal Ball	Safe D	November 5, 2018
RCP	Likely D	November 5, 2018
Daily Kos	Safe D	November 5, 2018
538	Safe D	November 7, 2018

==== Endorsements ====
Tom Suozzi (D)

Labor unions

- 1199SEIU United Healthcare Workers East
- New York State United Teachers

Organizations

- New York League of Conservation Voters

Newspapers

- Newsday
Dan DeBono (R)

U.S. representatives

- Peter T. King, NY-02 (1993–2021)
- Lee Zeldin, NY-01 (2015–2023)

Organizations

- Queens County Conservative Party

Individuals

- Roger Stone, political consultant

==== Results ====
New York's 3rd congressional district, 2018
Party	Candidate	Votes	%
Democratic	Tom Suozzi	149,937	56.2
Independence	Tom Suozzi	2,962	1.1
Working Families	Tom Suozzi	2,838	1.1
Women's Equality	Tom Suozzi	1,376	0.5
Reform	Tom Suozzi	343	0.1
Total	Tom Suozzi (incumbent)	157,456	59.0
Republican	Dan DeBono	98,716	37.0
Conservative	Dan DeBono	10,798	4.0
Total	Dan DeBono	109,514	41.0
Total votes		266,970	100.0
Democratic hold			

== District 4 ==
2018 New York's 4th congressional district election
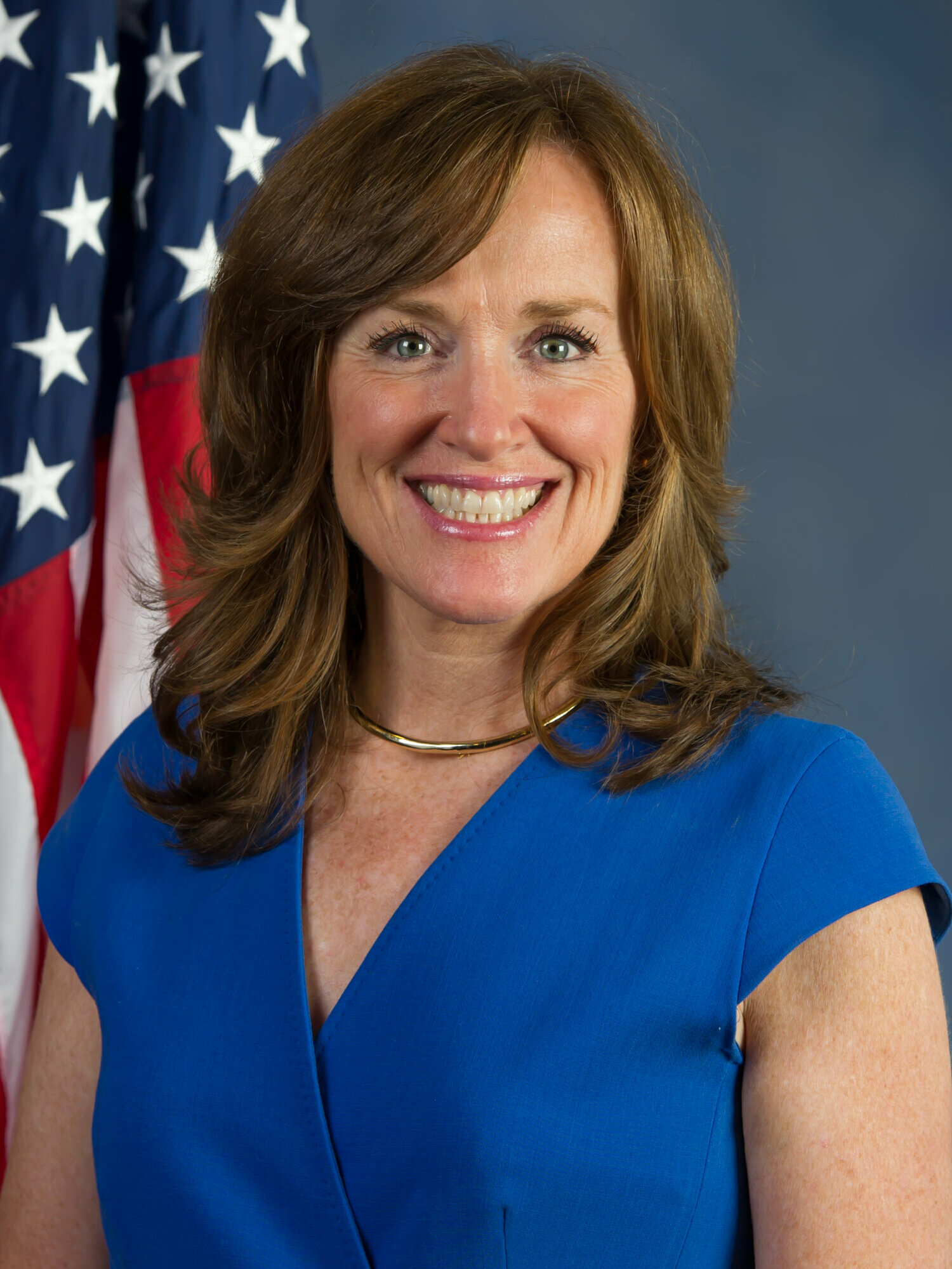

Nominee	Kathleen Rice	Ameer Benno
Party	Democratic	Republican
Alliance	Women's Equality	Conservative; Reform
Popular vote	159,535	100,571
Percentage	61.3%	38.7%
- County results Rice: 60–70%
U.S. Representative before election
Kathleen Rice
Democratic
Elected U.S. Representative
Kathleen Rice
Democratic

The 4th district is located in central and southern Nassau County. The incumbent was Democrat Kathleen Rice, who had represented the district since 2015. She was re-elected to a second term with 59.5% of the vote in 2016.

=== Democratic primary ===
==== Candidates ====
===== Nominee =====
- Kathleen Rice, incumbent U.S. Representative

=== Republican primary ===
==== Candidates ====
===== Nominee =====
- Ameer Benno, attorney

=== General election ===
==== Predictions ====
Source	Ranking	As of
The Cook Political Report	Safe D	November 5, 2018
Inside Elections	Safe D	November 5, 2018
Sabato's Crystal Ball	Safe D	November 5, 2018
RCP	Safe D	November 5, 2018
Daily Kos	Safe D	November 5, 2018
538	Safe D	November 7, 2018

==== Endorsements ====
Kathleen Rice (D)

Labor unions

- 1199SEIU United Healthcare Workers East
- New York State United Teachers

==== Results ====
New York's 4th congressional district, 2018
Party	Candidate	Votes	%
Democratic	Kathleen Rice	156,728	60.2
Women's Equality	Kathleen Rice	2,807	1.1
Total	Kathleen Rice (incumbent)	159,535	61.3
Republican	Ameer Benno	90,306	34.7
Conservative	Ameer Benno	9,709	3.7
Reform	Ameer Benno	556	0.2
Total	Ameer Benno	100,571	38.7
Total votes		260,106	100.0
Democratic hold			

== District 5 ==
2018 New York's 5th congressional district election
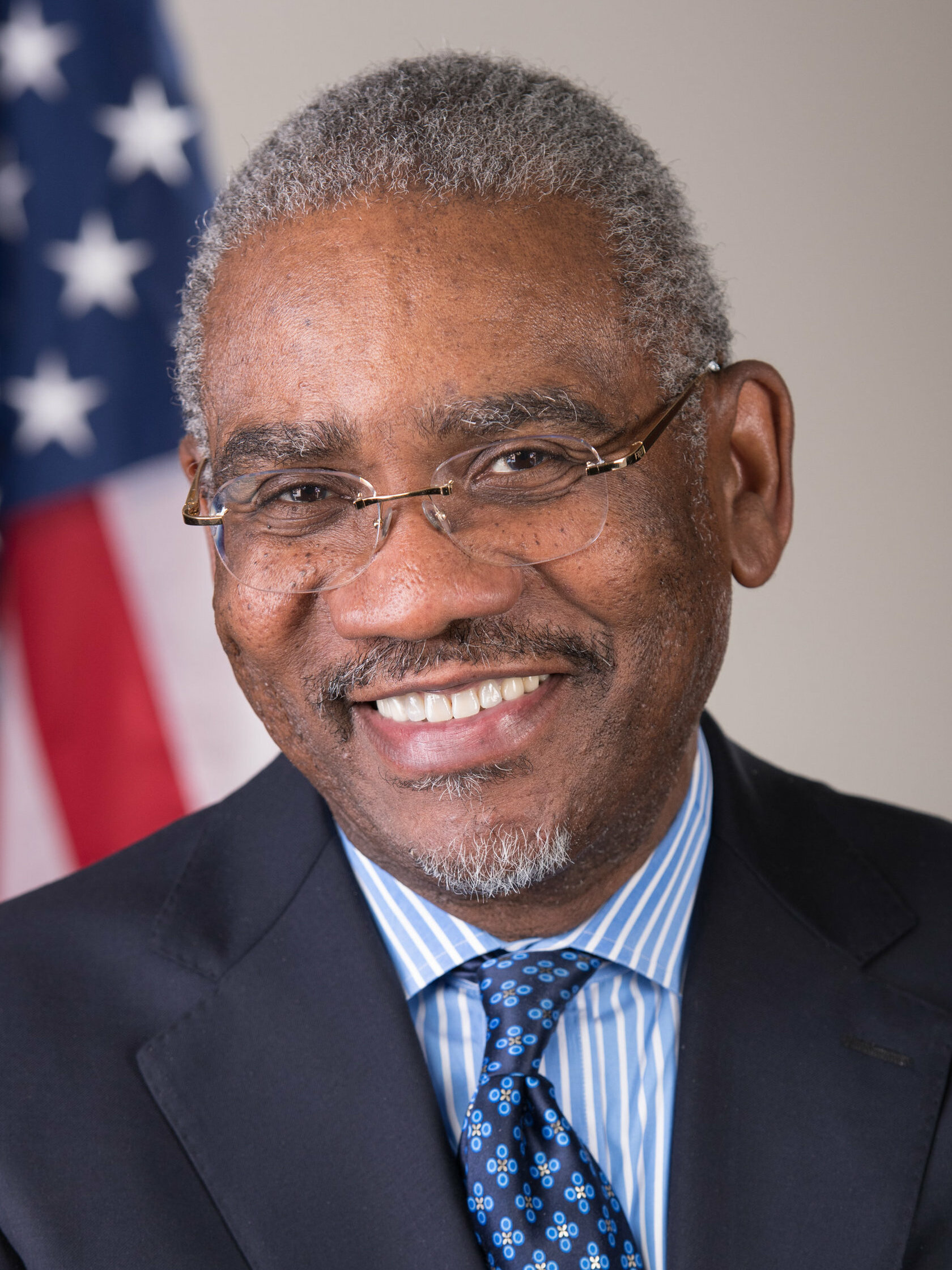
Nominee	Gregory Meeks
Party	Democratic
Popular vote	160,500
Percentage	100%
U.S. Representative before election
Gregory Meeks
Democratic
Elected U.S. Representative
Gregory Meeks
Democratic

The 5th district is mostly located within Queens in New York City, but also includes a small portion of Nassau County. The incumbent was Democrat Gregory Meeks, who had represented the district since 2013 and previously represented the 6th district from 1998 to 2013. He was re-elected to a tenth term with 85% of the vote in 2016.

=== Democratic primary ===
==== Candidates ====
===== Nominee =====
- Gregory Meeks, incumbent U.S. Representative

===== Eliminated in primary =====
- Carl Achille, former vice president of the Elmont Chamber of Commerce
- Mizan Choudhury, IT operations manager

==== Results ====
Democratic primary results
Party	Candidate	Votes	%
Democratic	Gregory Meeks (incumbent)	11,060	81.6
Democratic	Carl Achille	1,288	9.5
Democratic	Mizan Choudhury	1,200	8.9
Total votes		13,548	100.0

=== General election ===
==== Predictions ====
Source	Ranking	As of
The Cook Political Report	Safe D	November 5, 2018
Inside Elections	Safe D	November 5, 2018
Sabato's Crystal Ball	Safe D	November 5, 2018
RCP	Safe D	November 5, 2018
Daily Kos	Safe D	November 5, 2018
538	Safe D	November 7, 2018

==== Endorsements ====
Gregory Meeks (D)

Labor unions

- 1199SEIU United Healthcare Workers East
- New York State United Teachers

==== Results ====
New York's 5th congressional district, 2018
Party	Candidate	Votes	%
Democratic	Gregory Meeks (incumbent)	160,500	100.0
Total votes		160,500	100.0
Democratic hold			

== District 6 ==
2018 New York's 6th congressional district election
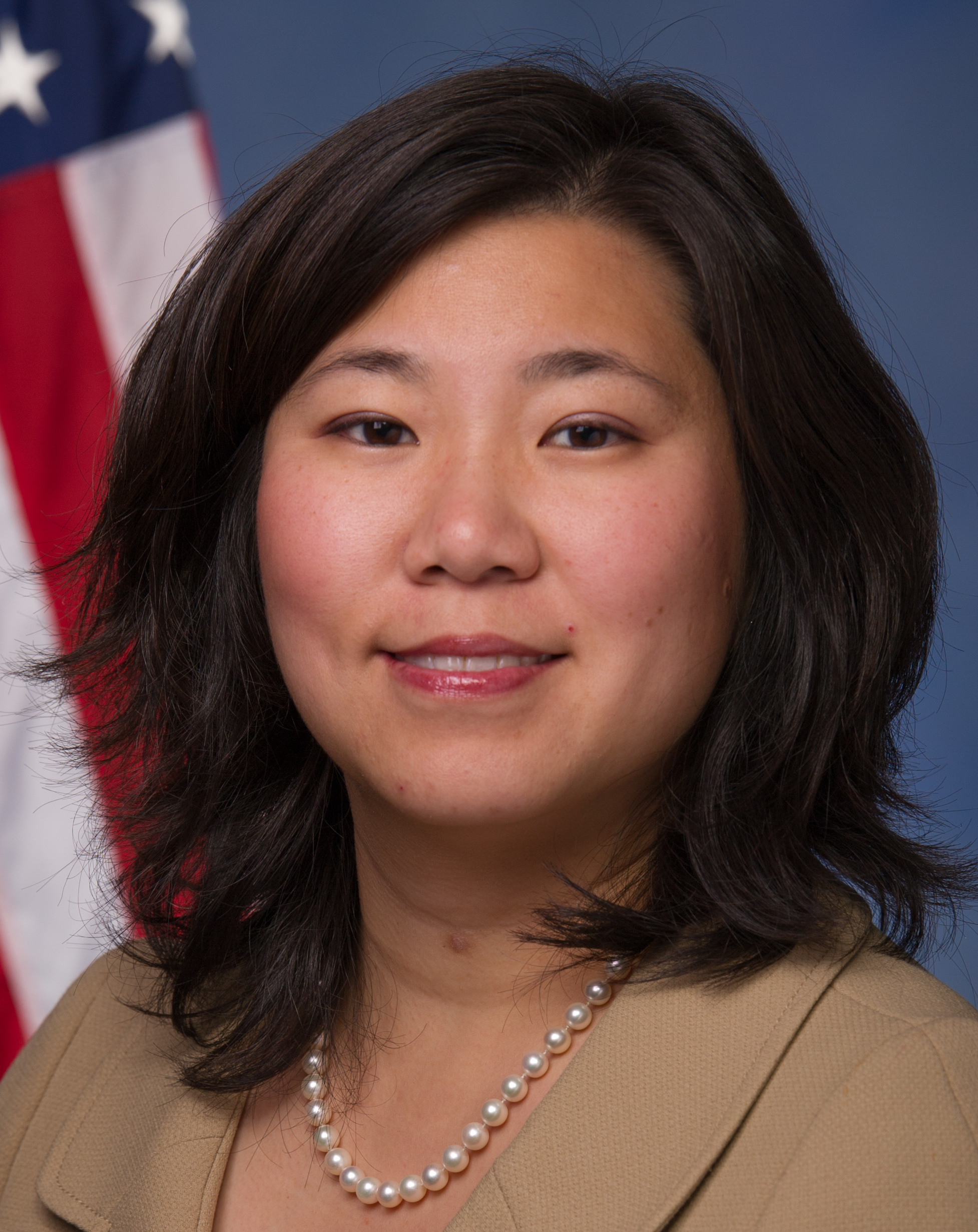

Nominee	Grace Meng	Thomas Hillgardner
Party	Democratic	Green
Alliance	Working Families; Reform
Popular vote	111,646	11,209
Percentage	90.9%	9.1%
- County results Meng: >90%
U.S. Representative before election
Grace Meng
Democratic
Elected U.S. Representative
Grace Meng
Democratic

The 6th district is located entirely within Queens in New York City. The incumbent was Democrat Grace Meng, who had represented the district since 2013. She was re-elected to a third term with 72% of the vote in 2016.

=== Democratic primary ===
==== Candidates ====
===== Nominee =====
- Grace Meng, incumbent U.S. Representative

=== General election ===
==== Predictions ====
Source	Ranking	As of
The Cook Political Report	Safe D	November 5, 2018
Inside Elections	Safe D	November 5, 2018
Sabato's Crystal Ball	Safe D	November 5, 2018
RCP	Safe D	November 5, 2018
Daily Kos	Safe D	November 5, 2018
538	Safe D	November 7, 2018

==== Endorsements ====
Grace Meng (D)

Labor unions

- 1199SEIU United Healthcare Workers East
- New York State United Teachers

==== Results ====
New York's 6th congressional district, 2018
Party	Candidate	Votes	%
Democratic	Grace Meng	104,293	84.9
Working Families	Grace Meng	6,429	5.2
Reform	Grace Meng	924	0.8
Total	Grace Meng (incumbent)	111,646	90.9
Green	Thomas Hillgardner	11,209	9.1
Total votes		122,855	100.0
Democratic hold			

== District 7 ==
2018 New York's 7th congressional district election
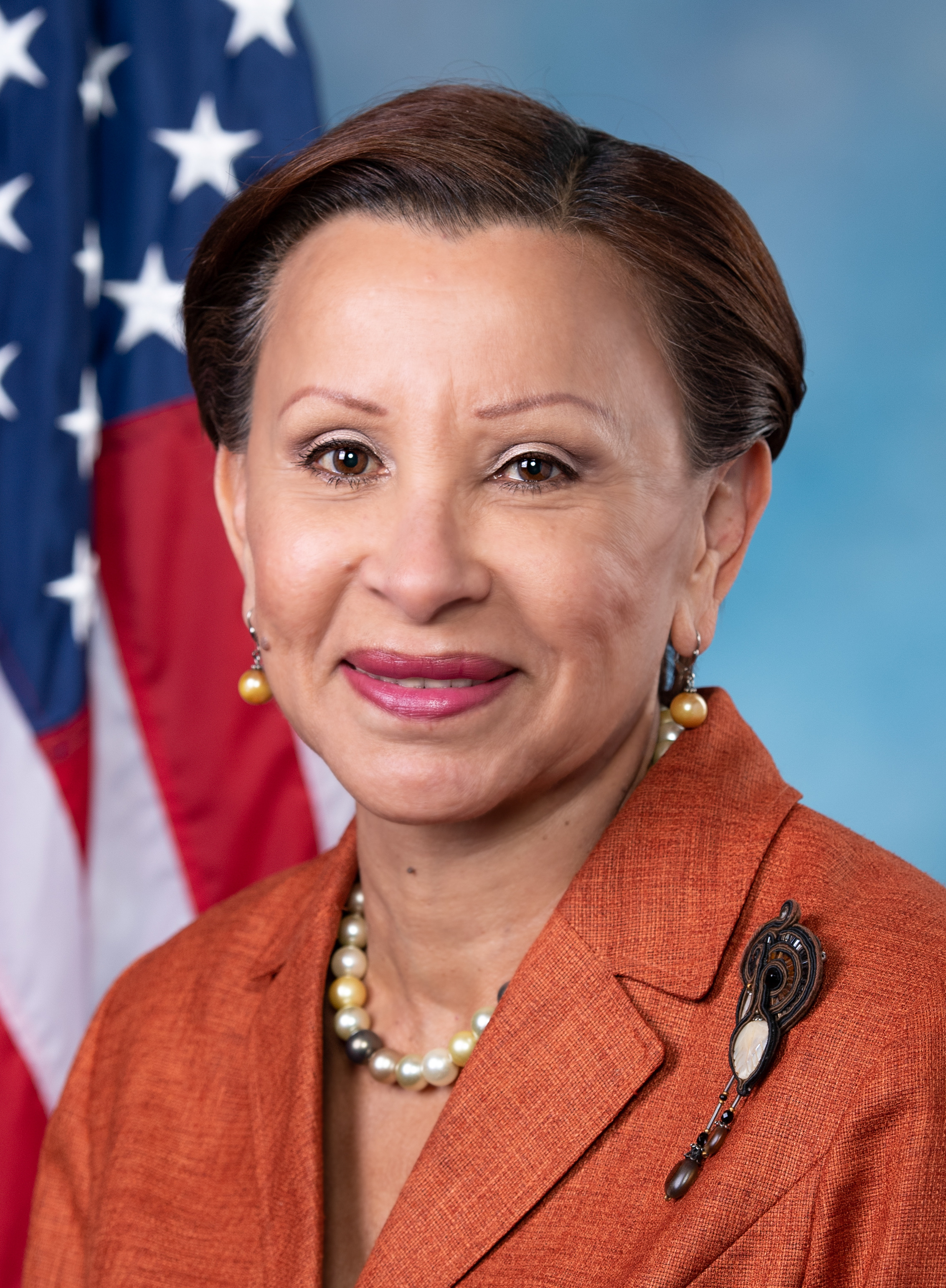

	Majority party	Minority party
Candidate	Nydia Velázquez	Joseph Lieberman
Party	Democratic	Conservative
Alliance	Working Families
Popular vote	146,687	8,670
Percentage	93.4%	5.5%
- County results Velazquez: 80–90% >90%
U.S. Representative before election
Nydia Velázquez
Democratic
Elected U.S. Representative
Nydia Velázquez
Democratic

The 7th district is located entirely in New York City and includes parts of Brooklyn, Queens, and Manhattan. The incumbent was Democrat Nydia Velázquez, who had represented the district since 2013 and previously represented the 12th district from 1993 to 2013. She was re-elected to a thirteenth term with 91% of the vote in 2016.

=== Democratic primary ===
==== Candidates ====
===== Nominee =====
- Nydia Velázquez, incumbent U.S. Representative

=== General election ===
==== Predictions ====
Source	Ranking	As of
The Cook Political Report	Safe D	November 5, 2018
Inside Elections	Safe D	November 5, 2018
Sabato's Crystal Ball	Safe D	November 5, 2018
RCP	Safe D	November 5, 2018
Daily Kos	Safe D	November 5, 2018
538	Safe D	November 7, 2018

==== Endorsements ====
Nydia Velázquez (D)

Labor unions

- 1199SEIU United Healthcare Workers East
- New York State United Teachers

==== Results ====
New York's 7th congressional district, 2018
Party	Candidate	Votes	%
Democratic	Nydia Velázquez	134,125	85.4
Working Families	Nydia Velázquez	12,562	8.0
Total	Nydia Velázquez (incumbent)	146,687	93.4
Conservative	Joseph Lieberman	8,670	5.5
Reform	Jeffrey Kurzon	1,740	1.1
Total votes		157,097	100.0
Democratic hold			

== District 8 ==
2018 New York's 8th congressional district election
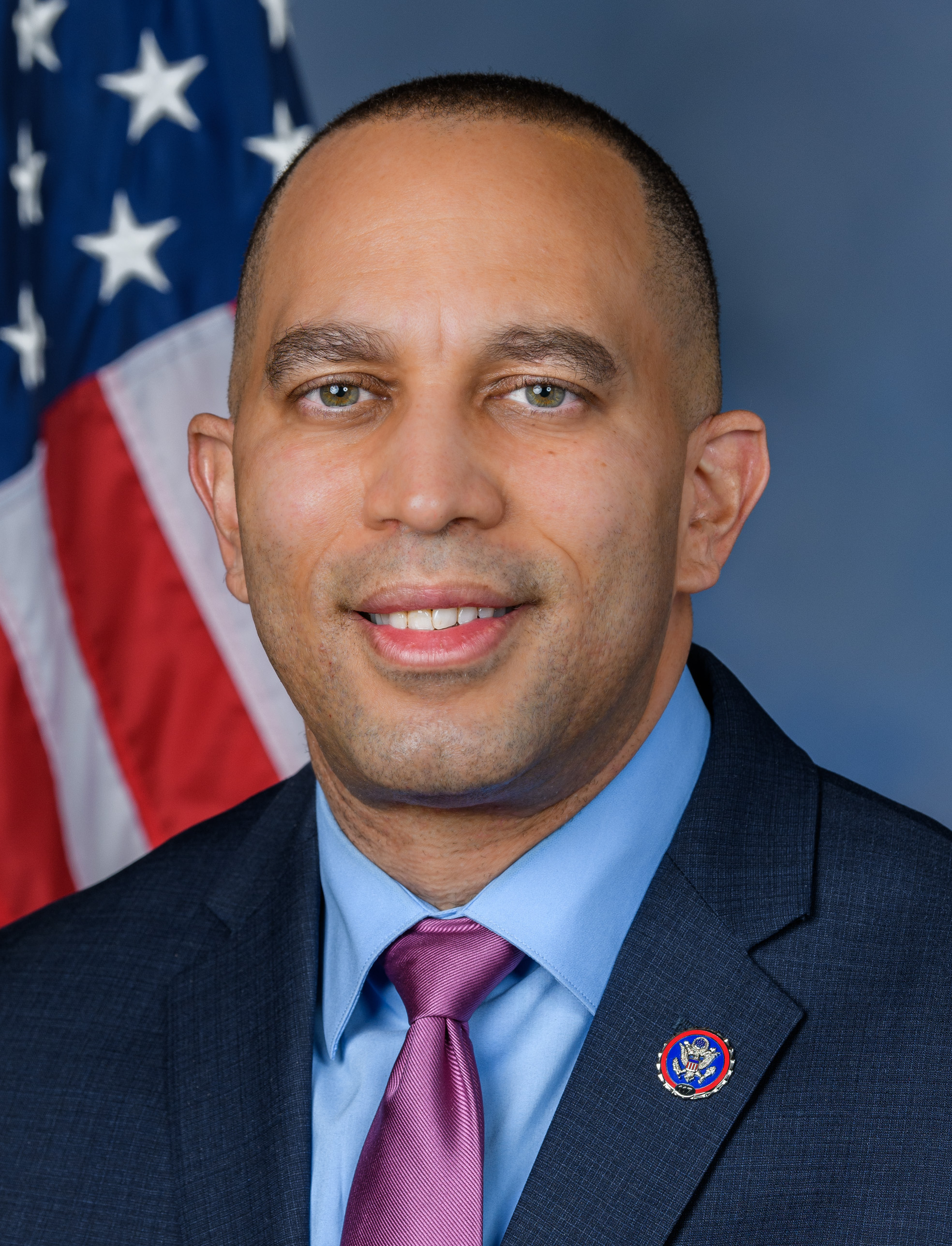

	Majority party	Minority party
Candidate	Hakeem Jeffries	Ernest Johnson
Party	Democratic	Conservative
Alliance	Working Families
Popular vote	180,376	9,997
Percentage	94.3%	5.2%
- County results Jefferies: 70–80% >90%
U.S. Representative before election
Hakeem Jeffries
Democratic
Elected U.S. Representative
Hakeem Jeffries
Democratic

The 8th district is located entirely in the New York City boroughs of Brooklyn and Queens. The incumbent was Democrat Hakeem Jeffries, who had represented the district since 2013. He was re-elected to a third term with 93% of the vote in 2016.

=== Democratic primary ===
==== Candidates ====
===== Nominee =====
- Hakeem Jeffries, incumbent U.S. Representative

=== General election ===
==== Predictions ====
Source	Ranking	As of
The Cook Political Report	Safe D	November 5, 2018
Inside Elections	Safe D	November 5, 2018
Sabato's Crystal Ball	Safe D	November 5, 2018
RCP	Safe D	November 5, 2018
Daily Kos	Safe D	November 5, 2018
538	Safe D	November 7, 2018

==== Endorsements ====
Hakeem Jeffries (D)

Labor unions

- 1199SEIU United Healthcare Workers East
- New York State United Teachers

==== Results ====
New York's 8th congressional district, 2018
Party	Candidate	Votes	%
Democratic	Hakeem Jeffries	170,850	89.3
Working Families	Hakeem Jeffries	9,526	5.0
Total	Hakeem Jeffries (incumbent)	180,376	94.3
Conservative	Ernest Johnson	9,997	5.2
Reform	Jessica White	1,031	0.5
Total votes		191,404	100.0
Democratic hold			

== District 9 ==
2018 New York's 9th congressional district election
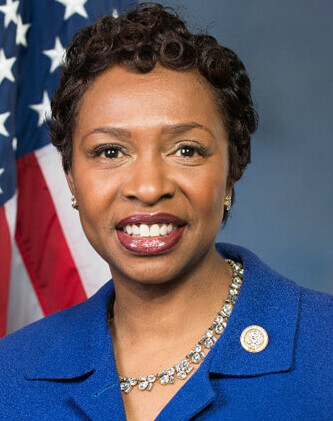

Nominee	Yvette Clarke	Lutchi Gayot
Party	Democratic	Republican
Alliance	Working Families	Conservative
Popular vote	181,455	20,901
Percentage	89.3%	10.3%
- County results Clarke: 80–90%
U.S. Representative before election
Yvette Clarke
Democratic
Elected U.S. Representative
Yvette Clarke
Democratic

The 9th district is located entirely within the New York City borough of Brooklyn. The incumbent was Democrat Yvette Clarke, who had represented the district since 2013 and previously represented the 11th district from 2007 to 2013. She was re-elected to a sixth term with 92% of the vote in 2016.

=== Democratic primary ===
==== Candidates ====
===== Nominee =====
- Yvette Clarke, incumbent U.S. Representative

===== Eliminated in primary =====
- Adem Bunkeddeko, former member of Brooklyn Community Board 8

==== Results ====

Clarke

50–60%
60–70%
70–80%
80–90%
90–100%

Bunkeddeko

50–60%
60–70%
70–80%
80–90%
90–100%

Other

40–50% tie
50% tie
No votes

Democratic primary results
Party	Candidate	Votes	%
Democratic	Yvette Clarke (incumbent)	16,202	53.0
Democratic	Adem Bunkeddeko	14,350	47.0
Total votes		30,552	100.0

=== Republican primary ===
==== Candidates ====
===== Nominee =====
- Lutchi Gayot, businessman

=== General election ===
==== Predictions ====
Source	Ranking	As of
The Cook Political Report	Safe D	November 5, 2018
Inside Elections	Safe D	November 5, 2018
Sabato's Crystal Ball	Safe D	November 5, 2018
RCP	Safe D	November 5, 2018
Daily Kos	Safe D	November 5, 2018
538	Safe D	November 7, 2018

==== Endorsements ====
Yvette Clarke (D)

Labor unions

- 1199SEIU United Healthcare Workers East
- New York State United Teachers

==== Results ====
New York's 9th congressional district, 2018
Party	Candidate	Votes	%
Democratic	Yvette Clarke	167,269	82.3
Working Families	Yvette Clarke	14,186	7.0
Total	Yvette Clarke (incumbent)	181,455	89.3
Republican	Lutchi Gayot	18,702	9.2
Conservative	Lutchi Gayot	2,199	1.1
Total	Lutchi Gayot	20,901	10.3
Reform	Joel Anabilah-Azumah	779	0.4
Total votes		203,135	100.0
Democratic hold			

== District 10 ==
2018 New York's 10th congressional district election
- November 11, 2018
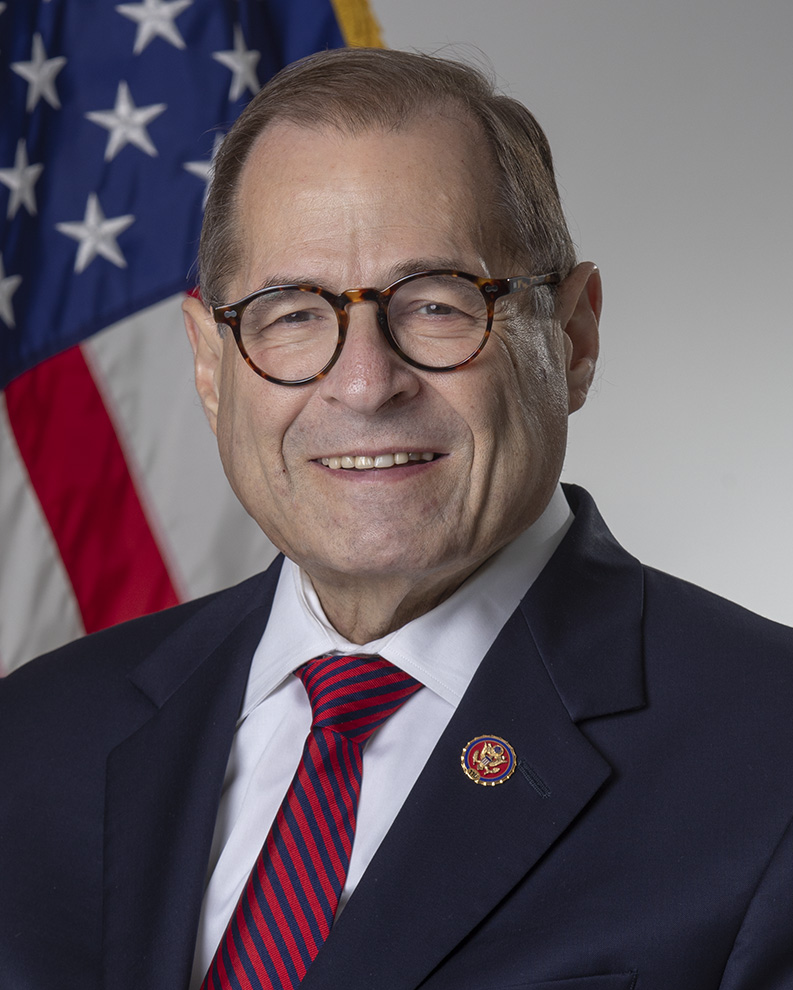

Nominee	Jerry Nadler	Naomi Levin
Party	Democratic	Republican
Alliance	Working Families	Conservative; Reform
Popular vote	173,095	37,619
Percentage	82.1%	17.9%
- County results Nadler: 50–60% 80–90%
U.S. Representative before election
Jerrold Nadler
Democratic
Elected U.S. Representative
Jerrold Nadler
Democratic

The 10th district is located in New York City and includes the Upper West Side of Manhattan; the west side of Lower Manhattan, including Greenwich Village and the Financial District; and parts of Brooklyn, including Borough Park. The incumbent was Democrat Jerrold Nadler, who had represented the district since 2013, and previously represented the 8th district from 1993 to 2013 and the 17th district from 1992 to 1993. He was re-elected to a thirteenth full term with 78% of the vote in 2016.

=== Democratic primary ===
==== Candidates ====
===== Nominee =====
- Jerrold Nadler, incumbent U.S. Representative

=== Republican primary ===
==== Candidates ====
===== Nominee =====
- Naomi Levin, software engineer

=== General election ===
==== Predictions ====
Source	Ranking	As of
The Cook Political Report	Safe D	November 5, 2018
Inside Elections	Safe D	November 5, 2018
Sabato's Crystal Ball	Safe D	November 5, 2018
RCP	Safe D	November 5, 2018
Daily Kos	Safe D	November 5, 2018
538	Safe D	November 7, 2018

==== Endorsements ====
Jerry Nadler (D)

Labor unions

- 1199SEIU United Healthcare Workers East
- New York State United Teachers

==== Results ====
New York's 10th congressional district, 2018
Party	Candidate	Votes	%
Democratic	Jerrold Nadler	162,131	76.9
Working Families	Jerrold Nadler	10,964	5.2
Total	Jerrold Nadler (incumbent)	173,095	82.1
Republican	Naomi Levin	33,692	16.0
Conservative	Naomi Levin	3,259	1.6
Reform	Naomi Levin	668	0.3
Total	Naomi Levin	37,619	17.9
Total votes		210,714	100.0
Democratic hold			

== District 11 ==
2018 New York's 11th congressional district election
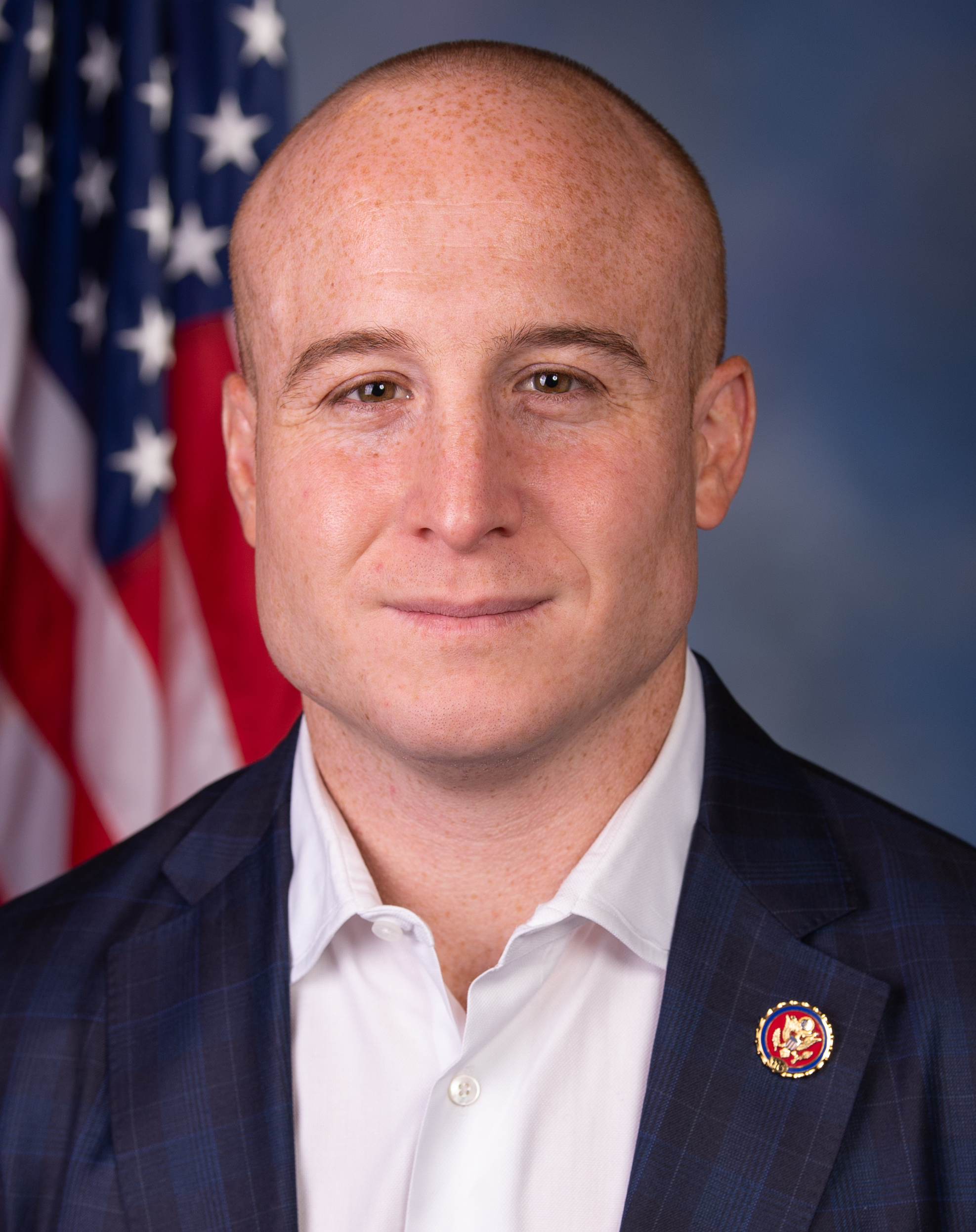

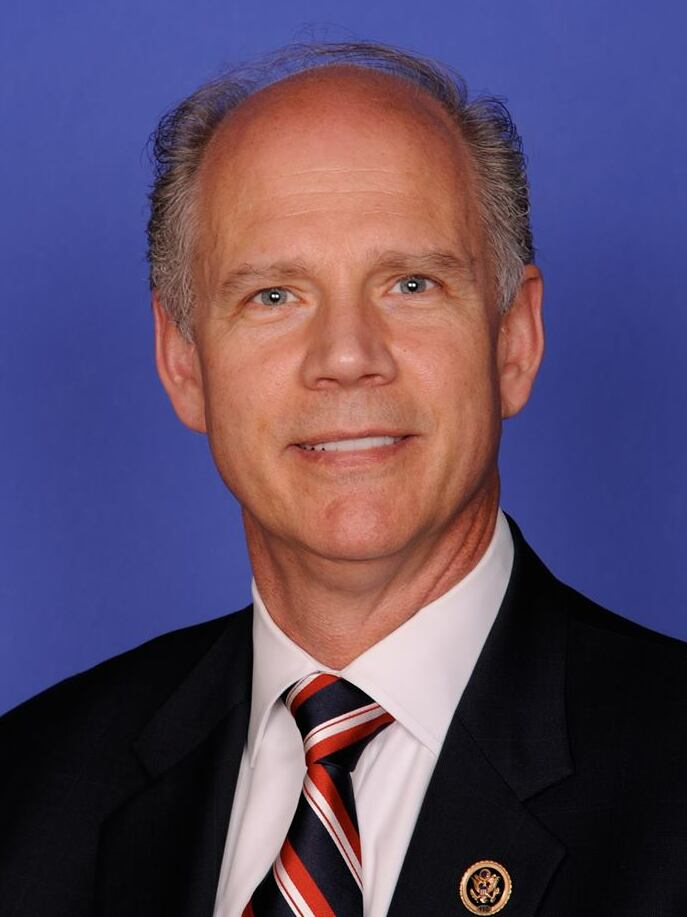
Nominee	Max Rose	Dan Donovan
Party	Democratic	Republican
Alliance	Working Families; Women's Equality	Conservative; Independence; Reform
Popular vote	101,823	89,441
Percentage	53.0%	46.6%
- County results Rose: 50–60%
U.S. Representative before election
Dan Donovan
Republican
Elected U.S. Representative
Max Rose
Democratic

The 11th district is located entirely in New York City and includes all of Staten Island and parts of southern Brooklyn. The incumbent was Republican Dan Donovan, who had represented the district since 2015. He was re-elected to a second term with 62% of the vote in 2016.

=== Republican primary ===
Former Congressman Michael Grimm, who resigned in 2014 after pleading guilty to federal tax fraud charges for which he served eight months in prison, challenged Donovan in the primary.

==== Candidates ====
===== Nominee =====
- Dan Donovan, incumbent U.S. Representative

===== Eliminated in primary =====
- Michael Grimm, former U.S. Representative and convicted felon

==== Endorsements ====
Dan Donovan

Executive officials

- Donald Trump, President of the United States

State legislators

- Ronald Castorina, state assembly member
- Marty Golden, state senator
- Andrew Lanza, state senator
- Nicole Malliotakis, state assembly member

Labor unions

- Detectives' Endowment Association
- International Union of Elevator Constructors Local 1
- International Union of Operating Engineers
- National Education Association
- New York AFL-CIO
- Police Benevolent Association of the City of New York
- Port Authority of New York and New Jersey Police Department
- United Association Local 1

Organizations

- Brooklyn Republican Party
- Staten Island Republican Party

Local officials

- Joe Borelli, NYC Councillor
- Rudy Giuliani, former Mayor of New York City
- Steven Matteo, NYC Councillor
- James Oddo, Borough President of Staten Island

==== Debates ====
- Complete video of debate, June 14, 2018

==== Polling ====
Poll source	Date(s) administered	Sample size	Margin of error	Dan Donovan (R)	Michael Grimm (R)	Other	Undecided
Remington Research (R)	June 20–21, 2018	703	± 3.7%	47%	40%	–	13%
Siena College	May 29–June 3, 2018	513	± 4.3%	37%	47%	–	16%

==== Results ====
Republican primary results
Party	Candidate	Votes	%
Republican	Dan Donovan (incumbent)	13,515	62.9
Republican	Michael Grimm	7,957	37.1
Total votes		21,472	100.0

=== Democratic primary ===
New York's 11th district was included on the initial list of Republican-held seats being targeted by the Democratic Congressional Campaign Committee in 2018.

==== Candidates ====
===== Nominee =====
- Max Rose, Army veteran and chief of staff at Brightpoint Health

===== Eliminated in primary =====
- Michael DeVito, retired Marine Staff Sergeant
- Zach Emig, bond trader
- Paul Sperling, entrepreneur

===== Withdrawn =====
- Mike DeCillis, teacher and retired police officer (endorsed Michael DeVito)
- Boyd Melson, retired boxer and Army Reserves Captain

==== Endorsements ====
Michael DeVito

Organizations

- Indivisble Staten Island
- Justice Democrats
Radhakrishna Mohan

Labor unions

- New York State Public Employees Federation
Max Rose

U.S. Senators

- Kirsten Gillibrand, United States Senator

U.S. Representatives

- Joe Crowley, U.S. Representative
- Steny Hoyer, U.S. Representative; House Minority Whip
- Ted Lieu, U.S. Representative
- Seth Moulton, U.S. Representative
- Eric Swalwell, U.S. Representative

State officials

- Jason Kander, former Missouri Secretary of State

State legislators

- Peter J. Abbate Jr., state assembly member

Labor unions

- New York State International Association of Machinists and Aerospace Workers
- Retail, Wholesale and Department Store Union

Organizations

- Blue Dog Coalition
- End Citizens United
- NARAL Pro-Choice America
- New Democrat Coalition
- VoteVets.org

Local officials

- Justin Brannan, NYC Councillor
- Scott Stringer, New York City Comptroller
Paul Sperling

Organizations

- Our Revolution
Omar Vaid

Labor unions

- International Alliance of Theatrical Stage Employees Local 1
- International Alliance of Theatrical Stage Employees Local 4
- International Alliance of Theatrical Stage Employees Local 10
- International Brotherhood of Teamsters Local 187
- United Scenic Artists

==== Results ====
Democratic primary results
Party	Candidate	Votes	%
Democratic	Max Rose	11,539	63.3
Democratic	Michael DeVito Jr.	3,642	20.0
Democratic	Omar Vaid	1,589	8.7
Democratic	Radhakrishna Mohan	719	4.0
Democratic	Paul Sperling	486	2.7
Democratic	Zach Emig	249	1.4
Total votes		18,224	100.0

=== Conservative primary ===
Dan Donovan also ran in the primary for the Conservative Party of New York State.

==== Results ====
Conservative primary results
Party	Candidate	Votes	%
Conservative	Dan Donovan (incumbent)	610	55.0
Conservative	Michael Grimm	497	44.7
Conservative	Max Rose	3	0.3
Total votes		1,110	100.0

=== General election ===
==== Predictions ====
Source	Ranking	As of
The Cook Political Report	Lean R	November 5, 2018
Inside Elections	Lean R	November 5, 2018
Sabato's Crystal Ball	Lean R	November 5, 2018
RCP	Lean R	November 5, 2018
Daily Kos	Lean R	November 5, 2018
538	Likely R	November 7, 2018

==== Endorsements ====
Dan Donovan (R)

Executive officials

- Donald Trump, President of the United States

State legislators

- Ronald Castorina, state assembly member
- Marty Golden, state senator
- Andrew Lanza, state senator
- Nicole Malliotakis, state assembly member

Labor unions

- Detectives' Endowment Association
- International Union of Elevator Constructors Local 1
- International Union of Operating Engineers
- National Education Association
- New York AFL-CIO
- Police Benevolent Association of the City of New York
- Port Authority of New York and New Jersey Police Department
- United Association Local 1

Organizations

- Brooklyn Republican Party
- Staten Island Republican Party

Local officials

- Joe Borelli, NYC Councillor
- Rudy Giuliani, former Mayor of New York City
- Steven Matteo, NYC Councillor
- James Oddo, Borough President of Staten Island
Max Rose (D)

U.S. Senators

- Kirsten Gillibrand, United States Senator

U.S. Representatives

- Joe Crowley, U.S. Representative
- Steny Hoyer, U.S. Representative; House Minority Whip
- Ted Lieu, U.S. Representative
- Seth Moulton, U.S. Representative
- Eric Swalwell, U.S. Representative

State officials

- Jason Kander, former Missouri Secretary of State

State legislators

- Peter J. Abbate Jr., state assembly member

Labor unions

- 1199SEIU United Healthcare Workers East
- New York State International Association of Machinists and Aerospace Workers
- New York State United Teachers
- Retail, Wholesale and Department Store Union
- SEIU 32BJ

Organizations

- Blue Dog Coalition
- End Citizens United
- NARAL Pro-Choice America
- New Democrat Coalition
- VoteVets.org

Local officials

- Justin Brannan, NYC Councillor
- Scott Stringer, New York City Comptroller

Individuals

- Héctor Figueroa, President of the SEIU 32BJ

==== Polling ====
Poll source	Date(s) administered	Sample size	Margin of error	Dan Donovan (R)	Max Rose (D)	Henry Bardel (G)	Undecided
NYT Upshot/Siena College	October 23–27, 2018	495	± 4.7%	44%	40%	1%	15%
Public Policy Polling (D)	September 4–5, 2018	509	–	47%	39%	–	14%

==== Results ====
New York's 11th congressional district, 2018
Party	Candidate	Votes	%
Democratic	Max Rose	96,850	50.4
Working Families	Max Rose	3,894	2.0
Women's Equality	Max Rose	1,079	0.6
Total	Max Rose	101,823	53.0
Republican	Dan Donovan	80,440	41.9
Conservative	Dan Donovan	7,352	3.8
Independence	Dan Donovan	1,302	0.7
Reform	Dan Donovan	347	0.2
Total	Dan Donovan (incumbent)	89,441	46.6
Green	Henry Bardel	774	0.4
Total votes		192,038	100.0
Democratic gain from Republican			

== District 12 ==
2018 New York's 12th congressional district election
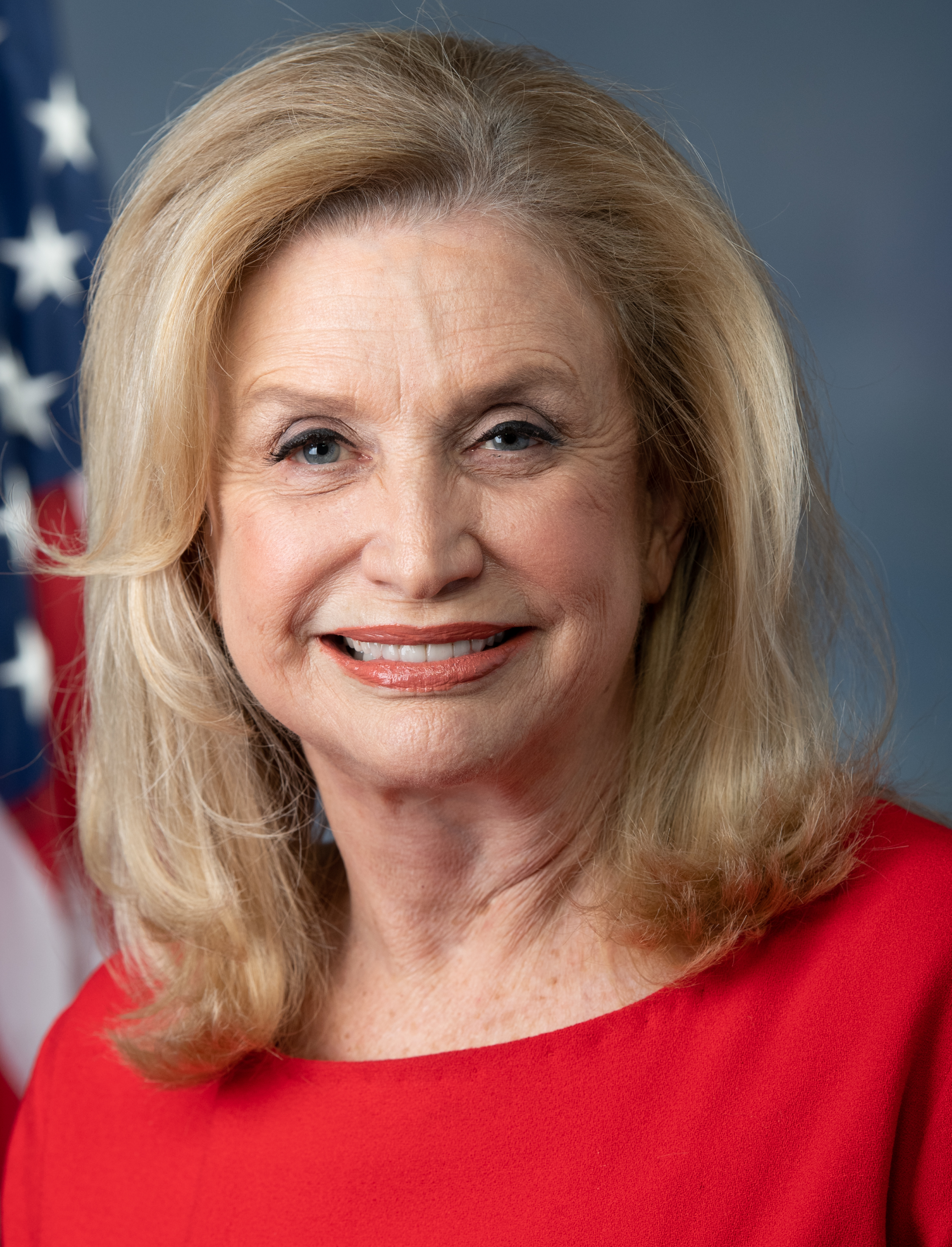

Nominee	Carolyn Maloney	Eliot Rabin
Party	Democratic	Republican
Alliance	Working Families; Reform
Popular vote	217,430	30,306
Percentage	86.4%	12.1%
- County results Maloney: 80–90% >90%
U.S. Representative before election
Carolyn Maloney
Democratic
Elected U.S. Representative
Carolyn Maloney
Democratic

The 12th district is located entirely in New York City and includes several neighborhoods in the East Side of Manhattan, Greenpoint and western Queens. The incumbent was Democrat Carolyn Maloney, who had represented the district since 2013 and previously represented the 14th district from 1993 to 2013. She was re-elected to a thirteenth term with 83% of the vote in 2016.

=== Democratic primary ===
==== Candidates ====
===== Nominee =====
- Carolyn Maloney, incumbent U.S. Representative

===== Eliminated in primary =====
- Suraj Patel, adjunct professor at NYU Stern School of Business

==== Results ====

Maloney

50–60%
60–70%
70–80%
80–90%
90–100%

Patel

40–50%
50–60%
60–70%
70–80%
80–90%
90–100%

Other

50% tie
No votes

Democratic primary results
Party	Candidate	Votes	%
Democratic	Carolyn Maloney (incumbent)	26,742	59.6
Democratic	Suraj Patel	18,098	40.4
Total votes		44,840	100.0

=== Republican primary ===
==== Candidates ====
===== Nominee =====
- Eliot Rabin, businessman

=== General election ===
==== Predictions ====
Source	Ranking	As of
The Cook Political Report	Safe D	November 5, 2018
Inside Elections	Safe D	November 5, 2018
Sabato's Crystal Ball	Safe D	November 5, 2018
RCP	Safe D	November 5, 2018
Daily Kos	Safe D	November 5, 2018
538	Safe D	November 7, 2018

==== Endorsements ====
Carolyn Maloney (D)

Labor unions

- 1199SEIU United Healthcare Workers East
- New York State United Teachers

==== Results ====
New York's 12th congressional district, 2018
Party	Candidate	Votes	%
Democratic	Carolyn Maloney	205,858	81.8
Working Families	Carolyn Maloney	10,972	4.4
Reform	Carolyn Maloney	600	0.2
Total	Carolyn Maloney (incumbent)	217,430	86.4
Republican	Eliot Rabin	30,446	12.1
Green	Scott Hutchins	3,728	1.5
Total votes		251,604	100.0
Democratic hold			

== District 13 ==
2018 New York's 13th congressional district election
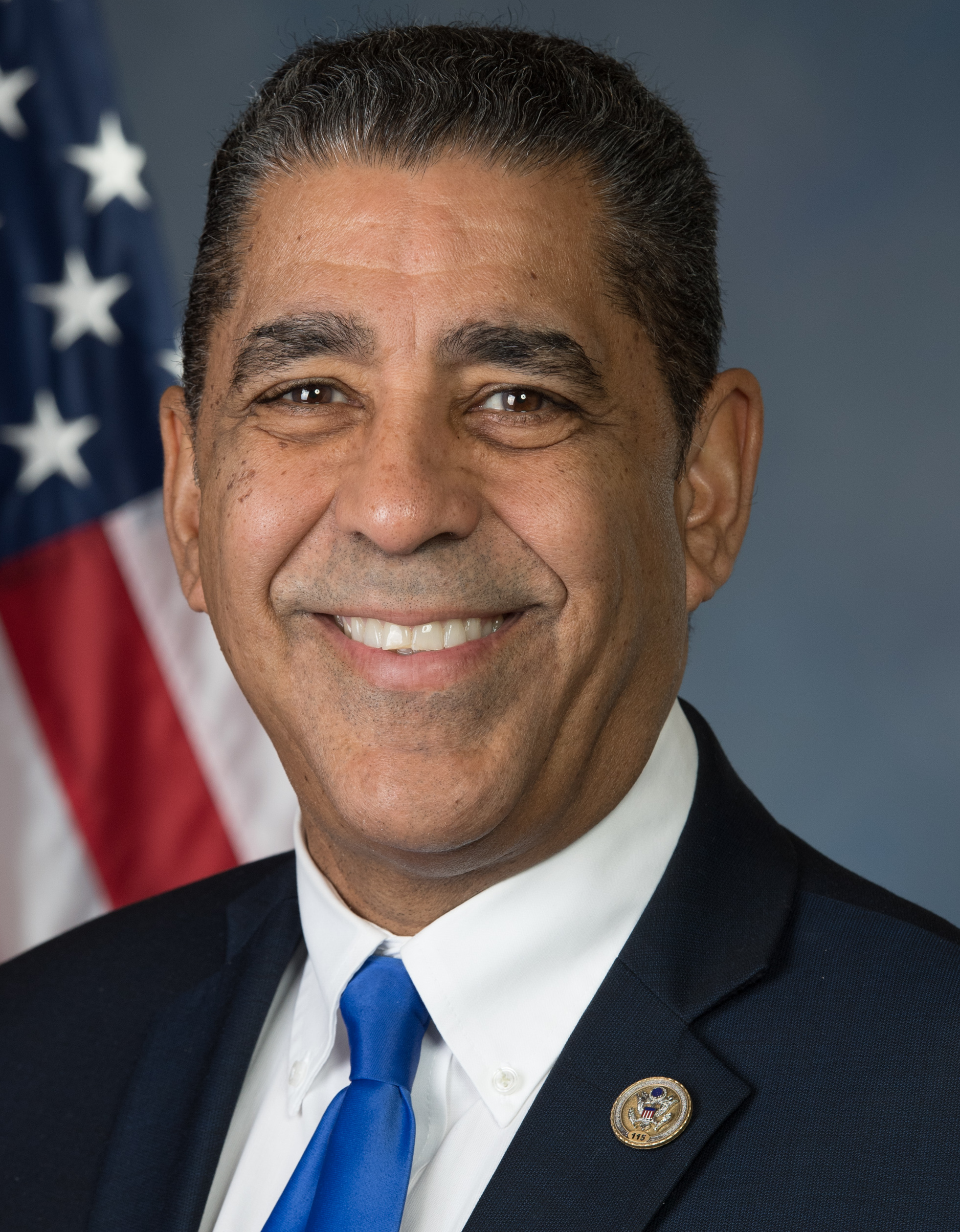

Nominee	Adriano Espaillat	Jineea Butler
Party	Democratic	Republican
Alliance	Working Families	Reform
Popular vote	180,035	10,268
Percentage	94.6%	5.4%
- County results Espaillat: >90%
U.S. Representative before election
Adriano Espaillat
Democratic
Elected U.S. Representative
Adriano Espaillat
Democratic

The 13th district is located entirely in New York City and includes Upper Manhattan and a small portion of the western Bronx. The incumbent was Democrat Adriano Espaillat, who had represented the district since 2017. He was elected to replace retiring representative Charles Rangel with 89% of the vote in 2016.

=== Democratic primary ===
==== Candidates ====
===== Nominee =====
- Adriano Espaillat, incumbent U.S. Representative

=== Republican primary ===
==== Candidates ====
===== Nominee =====
- Jineea Butler, hip hop analyst

=== General election ===
==== Predictions ====
Source	Ranking	As of
The Cook Political Report	Safe D	November 5, 2018
Inside Elections	Safe D	November 5, 2018
Sabato's Crystal Ball	Safe D	November 5, 2018
RCP	Safe D	November 5, 2018
Daily Kos	Safe D	November 5, 2018
538	Safe D	November 7, 2018

==== Endorsements ====
Adriano Espaillat (D)

Labor unions

- 1199SEIU United Healthcare Workers East
- New York State United Teachers

==== Results ====
New York's 13th congressional district, 2018
Party	Candidate	Votes	%
Democratic	Adriano Espaillat	171,341	90.0
Working Families	Adriano Espaillat	8,694	4.6
Total	Adriano Espaillat (incumbent)	180,035	94.6
Republican	Jineea Butler	9,535	5.0
Reform	Jineea Butler	733	0.4
Total	Jineea Butler	10,268	5.4
Total votes		190,303	100.0
Democratic hold			

== District 14 ==
2018 New York's 14th congressional district election
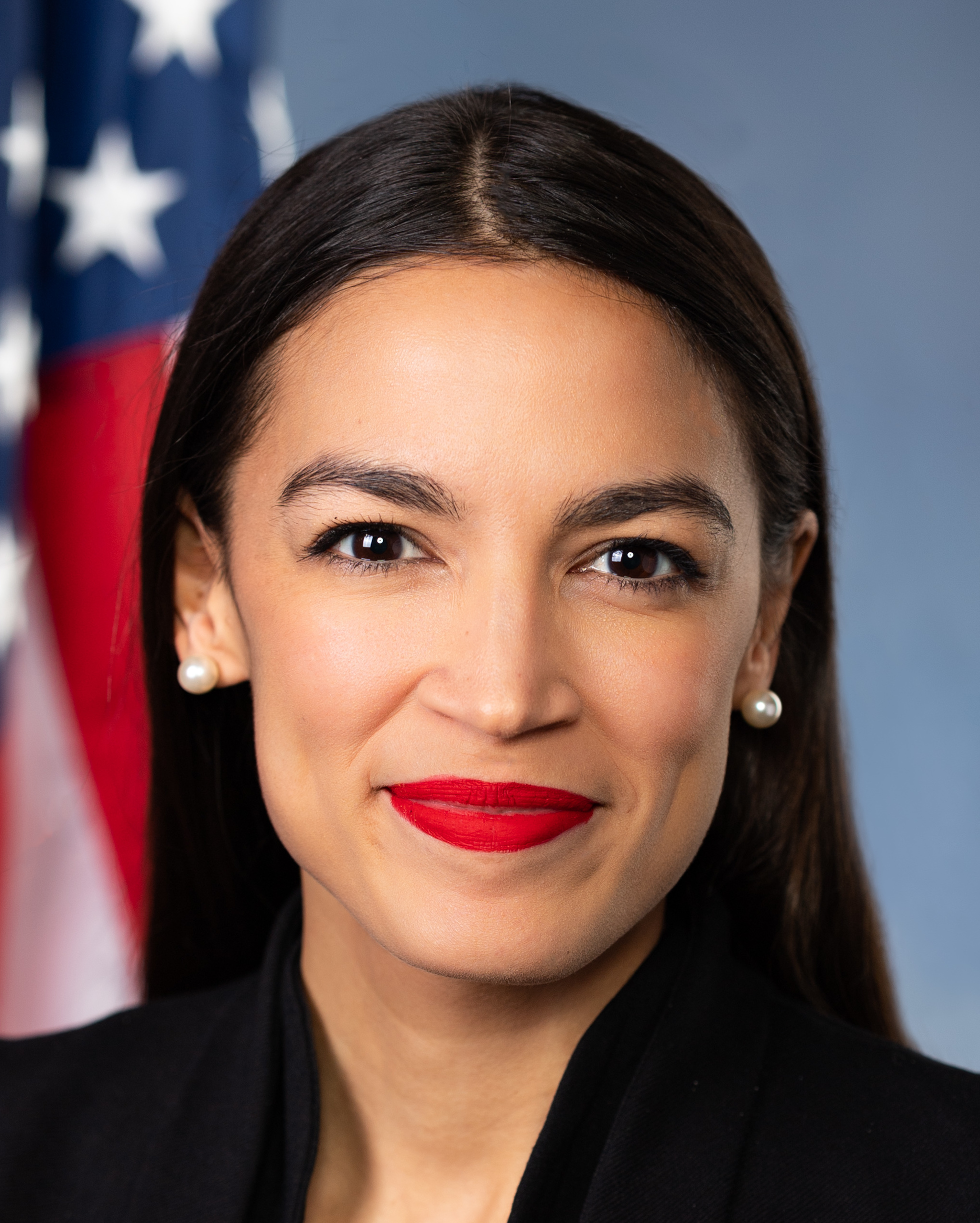

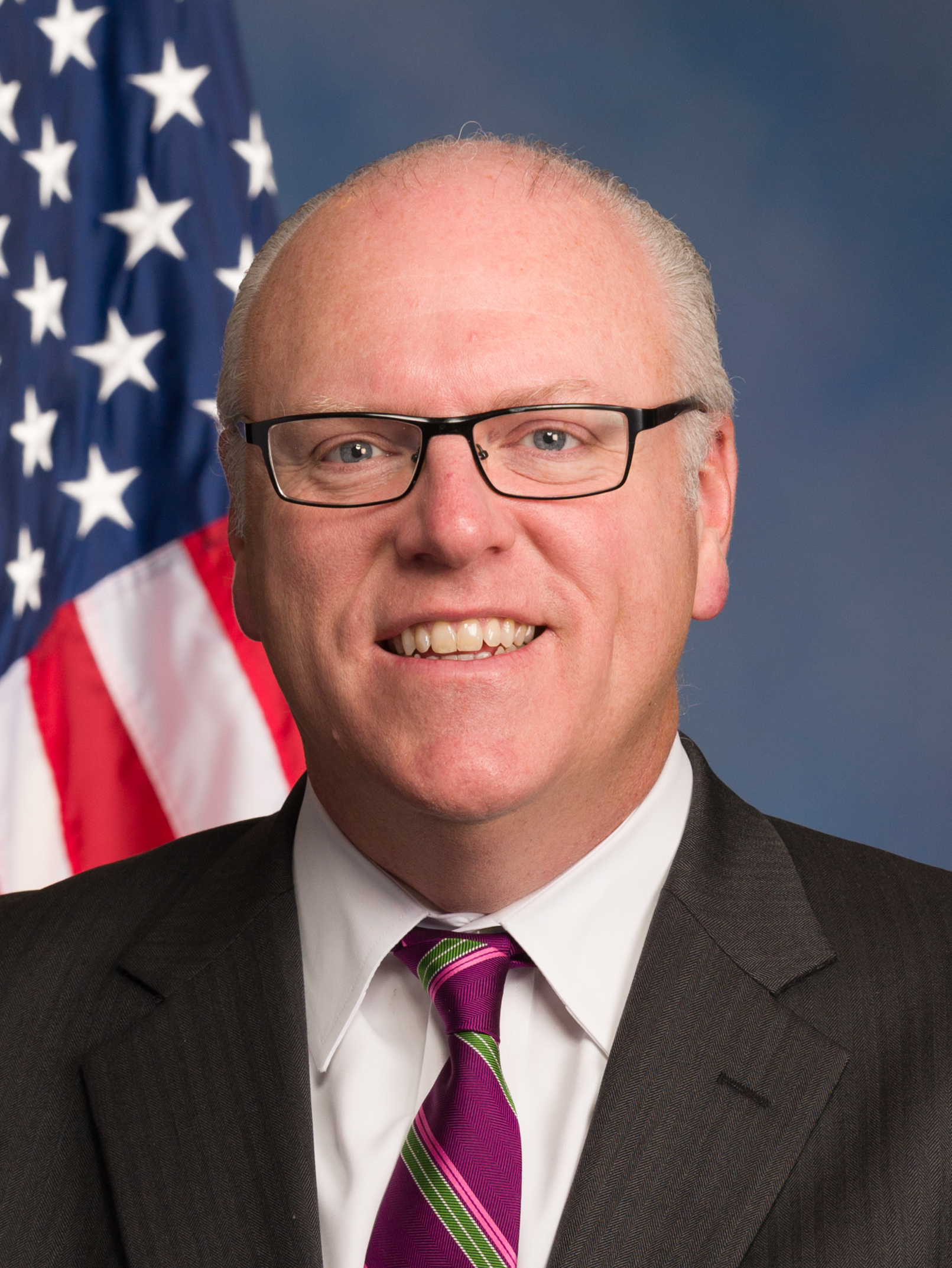
Nominee	Alexandria Ocasio-Cortez	Anthony Pappas	Joe Crowley
Party	Democratic	Republican	Working Families
Alliance	-	-	Women's Equality
Popular vote	110,318	19,202	9,348
Percentage	78.2%	13.6%	6.6%
- County results Ocasio-Cortez: 70–80%
U.S. Representative before election
Joe Crowley
Democratic
Elected U.S. Representative
Alexandria Ocasio-Cortez
Democratic

The 14th district is located in New York City and includes the eastern Bronx and part of north-central Queens. The incumbent was Democrat Joseph Crowley, a leader of the New Democrat Coalition, who had represented the district since 2013. Crowley previously represented the 7th district from 1999 to 2013. He was re-elected to a tenth term with 83% of the vote in 2016. Crowley, who had been named as a potential successor to Nancy Pelosi as House Leader or Speaker, sought re-election in 2018.

=== Democratic primary ===
Backed by the organization Brand New Congress, bartender and activist Alexandria Ocasio-Cortez challenged Crowley in the primary, announcing her campaign in June 2017. Ocasio-Cortez, who had been an organizer in Bernie Sanders' 2016 presidential campaign, was the first primary challenger Crowley had faced since 2004. On May 10, 2018, it was announced that she had gathered enough signatures to appear on the primary ballot. Despite this, most observers concluded that Crowley would win the primary, citing his strong support from elected officials and his large fundraising advantage.

In her campaign, Ocasio-Cortez claimed that Crowley was not progressive enough for the district, and also accused him of corruption, stating that he was using his position as chair of the Queens Democratic Party improperly. She aggressively built a presence on social media platforms, creating a biographical video promoting her campaign that went viral. Crowley significantly outspent Ocasio-Cortez prior to the primary election.

==== Candidates ====
===== Nominee =====
- Alexandria Ocasio-Cortez, bartender and activist

===== Eliminated in primary =====
- Joe Crowley, incumbent U.S. Representative

==== Debates ====
2018 New York's 14th congressional district Democratic primary debates
No.	Date & Time	Host	Moderator	Link	Participants	
Key: P Participant A Absent N Non-invitee W Withdrawn						
Key: P Participant A Absent N Non-invitee W Withdrawn					Joe Crowley	Alexandria Ocasio-Cortez
1	June 15, 2018	NY1	Errol Louis		P	P
2	June 18, 2018	The Parkchester Times	Robert Press		P (Note: Crowley did not personally attend the debate, sending former New York Councillor Annabel Palma as a surrogate.)	P

==== Endorsements ====
Joseph Crowley

U.S. senators

- Kirsten Gillibrand, New York (2009–present)
- Chuck Schumer, New York (1998–present)

U.S. representatives

- Hakeem Jeffries, NY-08 (2013–present)
- Ro Khanna, CA-17 (2017–present) (co-endorsement with Ocasio-Cortez)
- Ted Lieu, CA-33 (2015–present)
- Greg Meeks, NY-05 (1998–present)

Statewide officials

- Andrew Cuomo, governor of New York (2011–2021)

State legislators

- Marcos Crespo, AD-85 (2011–2020) and Chair of the Bronx County Democratic Committee (2015–2020)
- Aravella Simotas, AD-36 (2011–2021)

Local officials

- Corey Johnson, speaker of the New York City Council (2018–2021) from CD-03 (2014–present)
- 5 New York City councilmembers (Note: Costa Constantinides, New York City's CD-22 (2014–2021); Daniel Dromm, New York City's CD-25 (2010–2021); Francisco Moya, New York City's CD-21 (2018–2025); Annabel Palma, former New York City's CD-18 (2004–2017); Jimmy Van Bramer, New York City's CD-26 (2010–2021))

Labor unions

- New York State AFL-CIO
- SEIU 32BJ

Organizations

- Giffords
- Make the Road New York
- NARAL Pro-Choice America
- Planned Parenthood Action Fund
- Queens Democratic Party
- Stonewall Democrats of NYC
- Working Families Party
Alexandria Ocasio-Cortez

U.S. representatives

- Ro Khanna, CA-17 (2017–present) (co-endorsement with Crowley)

Individuals

- Cynthia Nixon, actress and candidate for governor of New York in 2018
- Susan Sarandon, actress

Organizations

- Brand New Congress
- Democracy for America
- Justice Democrats
- MoveOn
- New York City Democratic Socialists of America
- Our Revolution

==== Results ====
Results map by precinct (Interactive version) Ocasio-Cortez: 50–60%; 60–70%; 70–80%; 80–90%; 90–100%; Crowley: 50–60%; 60–70%; 70–80%; 80–90%; 90–100%; Tie No votes

Ocasio-Cortez defeated Crowley in the Democratic primary election, which was considered an upset victory.

Democratic primary results
Party	Candidate	Votes	%
Democratic	Alexandria Ocasio-Cortez	16,898	56.7
Democratic	Joseph Crowley (incumbent)	12,880	43.3
Total votes		29,778	100.0

=== Republican primary ===
==== Candidates ====
===== Nominee =====
- Anthony Pappas, St. John's University economics and finance associate professor

=== General election ===
==== Predictions ====
Source	Ranking	As of
The Cook Political Report	Safe D	November 5, 2018
Inside Elections	Safe D	November 5, 2018
Sabato's Crystal Ball	Safe D	November 5, 2018
RCP	Safe D	November 5, 2018
Daily Kos	Safe D	November 5, 2018
538	Safe D	November 7, 2018

==== Campaign ====
Following his defeat in the Democratic primary, Crowley remained on the ballot on the Working Families Party line, but did not actively campaign. Following Ocasio-Cortez's primary win, Joann Ariola, chairwoman of the Queens Republican Party, claimed that the Republican Party had a chance of winning the seat due to Ocasio-Cortez being a democratic socialist. Michael Rendino, chairman of the Bronx Republican Party, was more skeptical, declaring that "even if Crowley and Ocasio-Cortez split the vote, we'd still lose two-to-one".

Professor Anthony Pappas was the Republican nominee, but was disavowed by the Queens and Bronx Republican Parties after he was accused of committing domestic violence. Several Republicans approached both the Queens and Bronx Republican parties with the intent of replacing Pappas on the ballot, but Pappas refused to withdraw from the race. Pappas's campaign was based around the abolition of judicial immunity, which he argued had led to judges becoming unaccountable for their actions. Pappas's campaign manager attempted to convince him to run an aggressive campaign against Ocasio-Cortez, but he refused.

==== Endorsements ====
Alexandria Ocasio-Cortez (D)

U.S. representatives

- Ro Khanna, CA-17 (2017–present)

Labor unions

- 1199SEIU United Healthcare Workers East
- New York State United Teachers
- Retail, Wholesale and Department Store Union

Organizations

- Brand New Congress
- Democracy for America
- Democratic Socialists of America
- Justice Democrats
- MoveOn.org
- New York State Working Families Party
- Our Revolution
- The People for Bernie Sanders

Individuals

- Jimmy Dore, comedian and host of the Jimmy Dore Show
- Cynthia Nixon, 2018 candidate for governor of New York, actress, and activist
- Susan Sarandon, actress and activist
- Zephyr Teachout, political activist and candidate for attorney general of New York in 2018
- Cenk Uygur, host of The Young Turks
Anthony Pappas (R)

Political parties

- Bronx Republican Party (endorsement rescinded)
- Queens Republican Party (endorsement rescinded)
Joseph Crowley (WF)

U.S. senators

- Joe Lieberman former Connecticut (1989–2013) (Independent)

Newspapers

- The Wall Street Journal

==== Results ====
New York's 14th congressional district, 2018
Party	Candidate	Votes	%
Democratic	Alexandria Ocasio-Cortez	110,318	78.2
Republican	Anthony Pappas	19,202	13.6
Working Families	Joseph Crowley	8,075	5.7
Women's Equality	Joseph Crowley	1,273	0.9
Total	Joseph Crowley (incumbent)	9,348	6.6
Conservative	Elizabeth Perri	2,254	1.6
Total votes		141,122	100.0
Democratic hold			

== District 15 ==
2018 New York's 15th congressional district election
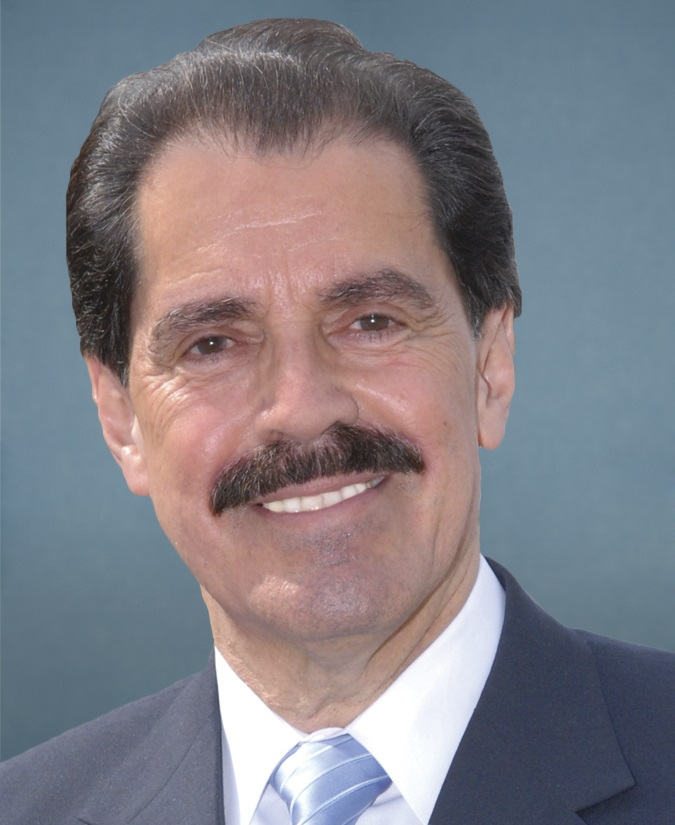

Nominee	José E. Serrano	Jason Gonzalez
Party	Democratic	Republican
Alliance	Working Families	Conservative
Popular vote	124,469	5,205
Percentage	96.0%	4.0%
- County results Serrano: >90%
U.S. Representative before election
José E. Serrano
Democratic
Elected U.S. Representative
José E. Serrano
Democratic

The 15th district is located entirely within The Bronx in New York City and is one of the smallest districts by area in the entire country. The incumbent was Democrat José E. Serrano, who had represented the district since 2013, and previously represented the 16th district from 1993 to 2013 and the 18th district from 1990 to 1993. He was re-elected to a fourteenth full term with 95% of the vote in 2016.

=== Democratic primary ===
==== Candidates ====
===== Nominee =====
- José E. Serrano, incumbent U.S. Representative

=== Republican primary ===
==== Candidates ====
===== Nominee =====
- Jason Gonzalez

=== Reform primary ===
==== Candidates ====
===== Nominee =====
- Alexandria Ocasio-Cortez (write-in) (declined nomination)

=== General election ===
==== Predictions ====
Source	Ranking	As of
The Cook Political Report	Safe D	November 5, 2018
Inside Elections	Safe D	November 5, 2018
Sabato's Crystal Ball	Safe D	November 5, 2018
RCP	Safe D	November 5, 2018
Daily Kos	Safe D	November 5, 2018
538	Safe D	November 7, 2018

==== Endorsements ====
José Serrano (D)

Labor unions

- 1199SEIU United Healthcare Workers East
- New York State United Teachers

==== Results ====
New York's 15th congressional district, 2018
Party	Candidate	Votes	%
Democratic	José Serrano	122,007	94.1
Working Families	José Serrano	2,462	1.9
Total	José E. Serrano (incumbent)	124,469	96.0
Republican	Jason Gonzalez	4,566	3.5
Conservative	Jason Gonzalez	639	0.5
Total	Jason Gonzalez	5,205	4.0
Total votes		129,674	100.0
Democratic hold			

== District 16 ==
2018 New York's 16th congressional district election
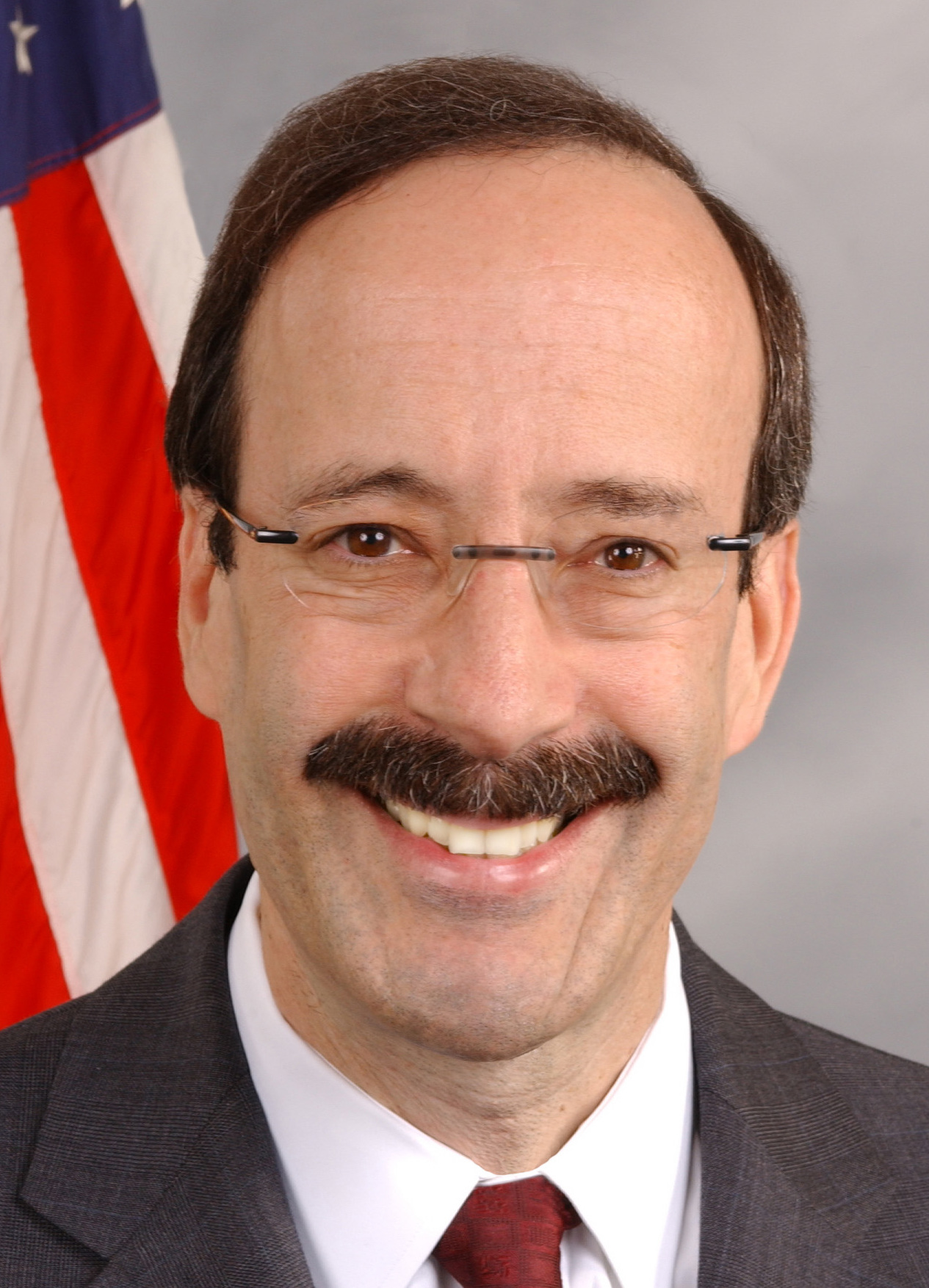
Nominee	Eliot Engel
Party	Democratic
Alliance	Working Families; Women's Equality Party
Popular vote	182,044
Percentage	100%
U.S. Representative before election
Eliot Engel
Democratic
Elected U.S. Representative
Eliot Engel
Democratic

The 16th district is located in the northern part of The Bronx and the southern half of Westchester County, including the cities of Mount Vernon, Yonkers, New Rochelle, and Rye. The incumbent was Democrat Eliot Engel, who had represented the district since 2013 and previously represented the 17th district from 1993 to 2013 and the 19th district from 1989 to 1993. He was re-elected to a fifteenth term with 95% of the vote in 2016.

=== Democratic primary ===
==== Candidates ====
===== Nominee =====
- Eliot Engel, incumbent U.S. Representative

===== Eliminated in primary =====
- Joyce Briscoe
- Derickson Lawrence
- Jonathan Lewis

==== Results ====
Democratic primary results
Party	Candidate	Votes	%
Democratic	Eliot Engel (incumbent)	22,160	73.7
Democratic	Jonathan Lewis	4,866	16.2
Democratic	Joyce Briscoe	1,772	5.9
Democratic	Derickson Lawrence	1,280	4.2
Total votes		30,078	100.0

=== General election ===
==== Predictions ====
Source	Ranking	As of
The Cook Political Report	Safe D	November 5, 2018
Inside Elections	Safe D	November 5, 2018
Sabato's Crystal Ball	Safe D	November 5, 2018
RCP	Safe D	November 5, 2018
Daily Kos	Safe D	November 5, 2018
538	Safe D	November 7, 2018

==== Endorsements ====
Eliot Engel (D)

Labor unions

- 1199SEIU United Healthcare Workers East
- New York State United Teachers

==== Results ====
New York's 16th congressional district, 2018
Party	Candidate	Votes	%
Democratic	Eliot Engel	172,815	94.9
Working Families	Eliot Engel	6,755	3.7
Women's Equality	Eliot Engel	2,474	1.4
Total	Eliot Engel (incumbent)	182,044	100.0
Total votes		182,044	100.0
Democratic hold			

== District 17 ==
2018 New York's 17th congressional district election
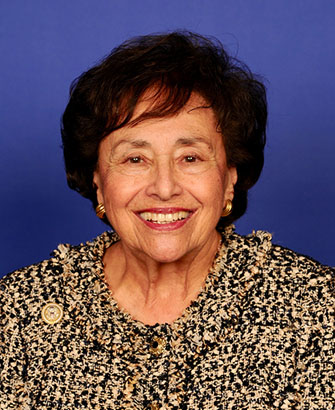

Nominee	Nita Lowey	Joseph Ciardullo
Party	Democratic	Reform
Alliance	Working Families; Women's Equality
Popular vote	170,168	23,150
Percentage	88.0%	12.0%
- County results Lowey: 80–90% >90%
U.S. Representative before election
Nita Lowey
Democratic
Elected U.S. Representative
Nita Lowey
Democratic

The 17th district contains all of Rockland County and the northern and central portions of Westchester County, including the cities of Peekskill and White Plains. The incumbent was Democrat Nita Lowey, who had represented the district since 2013 and previously represented the 18th district from 1993 to 2013 and the 20th district from 1989 to 1993. She was re-elected to a fifteenth term unopposed in 2016.

=== Democratic primary ===
==== Candidates ====
===== Nominee =====
- Nita Lowey, incumbent U.S. Representative

=== General election ===
==== Predictions ====
Source	Ranking	As of
The Cook Political Report	Safe D	November 5, 2018
Inside Elections	Safe D	November 5, 2018
Sabato's Crystal Ball	Safe D	November 5, 2018
RCP	Safe D	November 5, 2018
Daily Kos	Safe D	November 5, 2018
538	Safe D	November 7, 2018

==== Endorsements ====
Nita Lowey (D)

Labor unions

- 1199SEIU United Healthcare Workers East
- New York State United Teachers

==== Results ====
New York's 17th congressional district, 2018
Party	Candidate	Votes	%
Democratic	Nita Lowey	159,923	82.7
Working Families	Nita Lowey	7,336	3.8
Women's Equality	Nita Lowey	2,909	1.5
Total	Nita Lowey (incumbent)	170,168	88.0
Reform	Joseph Ciardullo	23,150	12.0
Total votes		193,318	100.0
Democratic hold			

== District 18 ==
2018 New York's 18th congressional district election
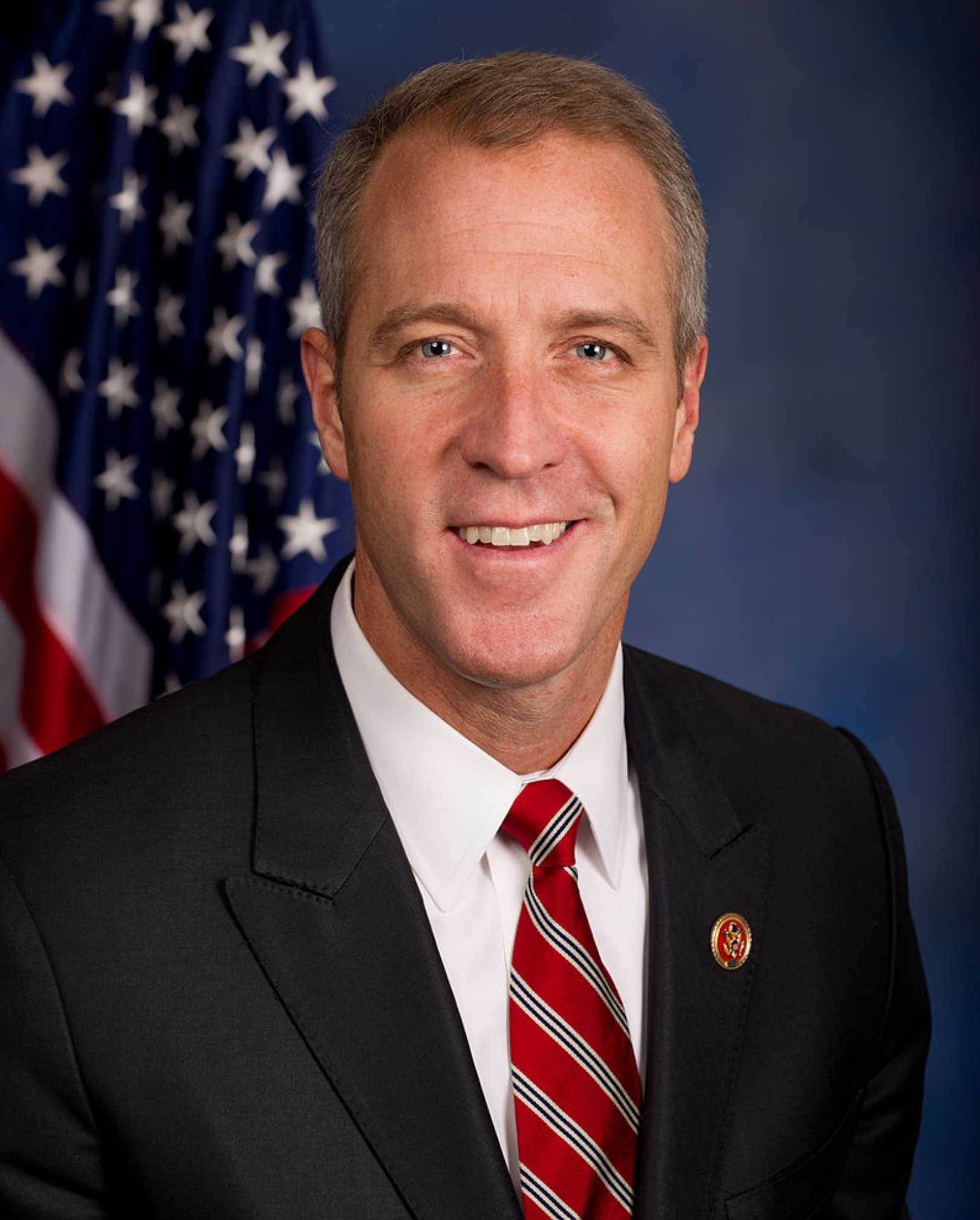

Nominee	Sean Patrick Maloney	James O'Donnell
Party	Democratic	Republican
Alliance	Working Families; Women's Equility; Independence	Conservative; Reform
Popular vote	139,564	112,035
Percentage	55.5%	44.5%
- County results Maloney: 50–60% 60–70% O'Donnell: 50–60%
U.S. Representative before election
Sean Patrick Maloney
Democratic
Elected U.S. Representative
Sean Patrick Maloney
Democratic

The 18th district is located entirely within the Hudson Valley, covering all of Orange County and Putnam County, as well as parts of southern Dutchess County and northeastern Westchester County. The incumbent was Democrat Sean Patrick Maloney, who had represented the district since 2013. He was re-elected to a third term with 56% of the vote in 2016.

=== Democratic primary ===
==== Candidates ====
===== Nominee =====
- Sean Patrick Maloney, incumbent U.S. Representative

=== Republican primary ===
New York's 18th district was included on the initial list of Democratic held seats that were being targeted by the National Republican Congressional Committee in 2018.

==== Candidates ====
===== Nominee =====
- James O'Donnell, Orange County legislator

=== General election ===
==== Predictions ====
Source	Ranking	As of
The Cook Political Report	Safe D	November 5, 2018
Inside Elections	Safe D	November 5, 2018
Sabato's Crystal Ball	Likely D	November 5, 2018
RCP	Likely D	November 5, 2018
Daily Kos	Safe D	November 5, 2018
538	Safe D	November 7, 2018

==== Debate ====
2018 New York's 18th congressional district debate
No.	Date	Host	Moderator	Link	Democratic	Republican
Key: P Participant A Absent N Not invited I Invited W Withdrawn						
Key: P Participant A Absent N Not invited I Invited W Withdrawn					Sean Patrick Maloney	James O'Donnell
1	Oct. 23, 2018	WRNN-TV	Richard French		P	P

==== Endorsements ====
Sean Patrick Maloney (D)

Labor unions

- 1199SEIU United Healthcare Workers East
- New York State United Teachers

==== Results ====
New York's 18th congressional district, 2018
Party	Candidate	Votes	%
Democratic	Sean Patrick Maloney	126,368	50.2
Independence	Sean Patrick Maloney	7,726	3.1
Working Families	Sean Patrick Maloney	3,929	1.6
Women's Equality	Sean Patrick Maloney	1,541	0.6
Total	Sean Patrick Maloney (incumbent)	139,564	55.5
Republican	James O'Donnell	96,345	38.3
Conservative	James O'Donnell	14,484	5.7
Reform	James O'Donnell	1,206	0.5
Total	James O'Donnell	112,035	44.5
Total votes		251,599	100.0
Democratic hold			

== District 19 ==
2018 New York's 19th congressional district election
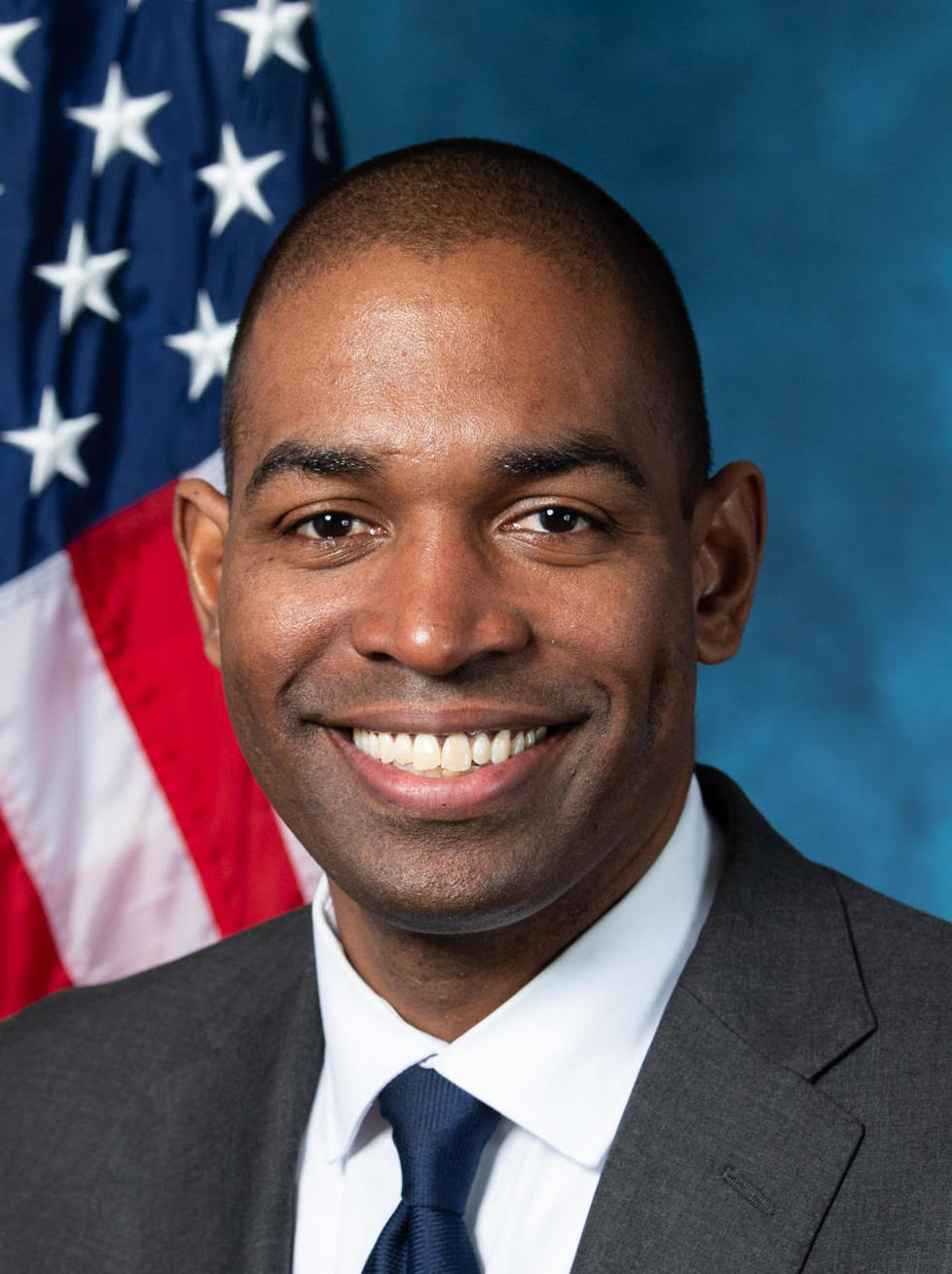

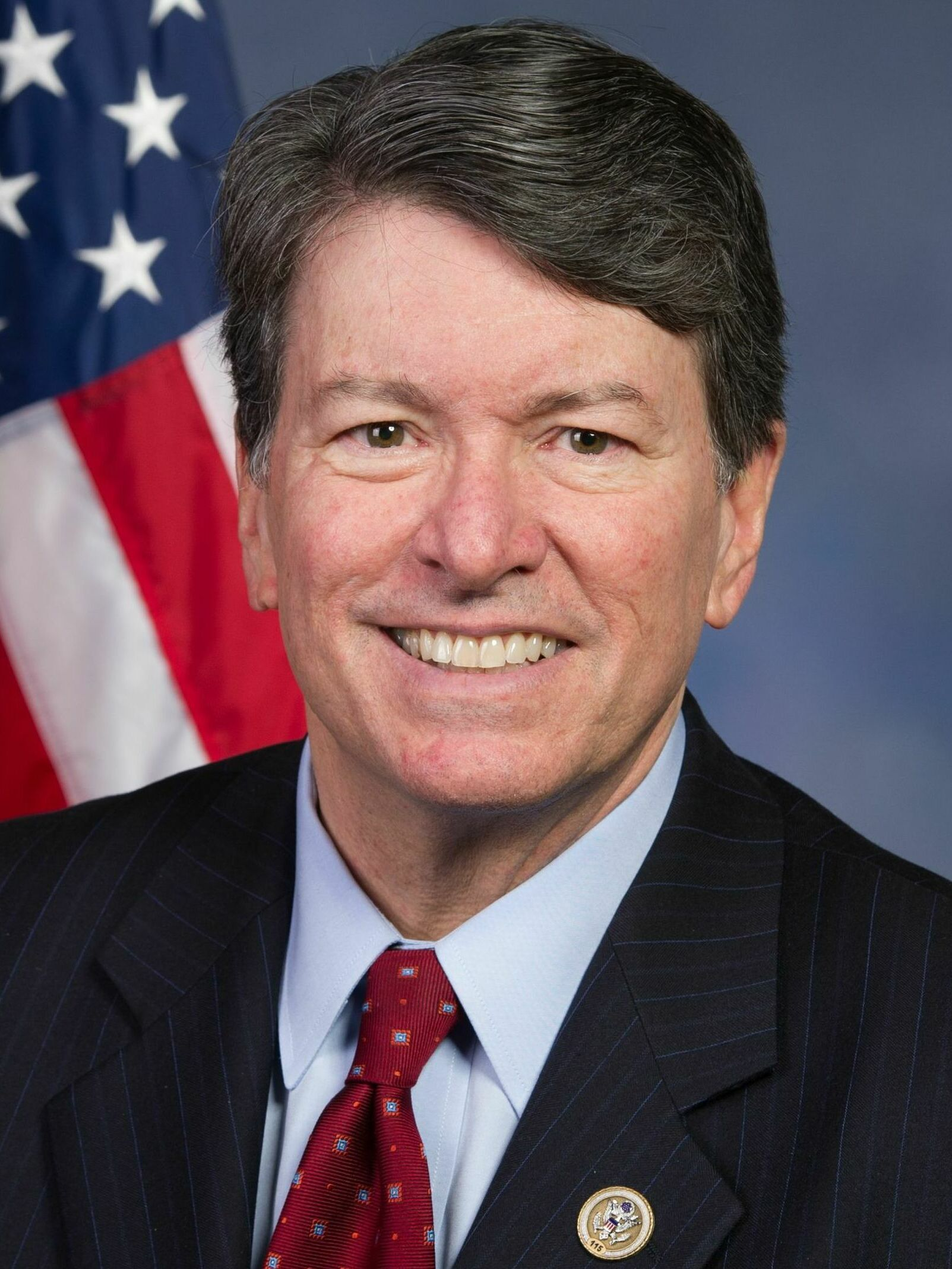
Nominee	Antonio Delgado	John Faso
Party	Democratic	Republican
Alliance	Working Families; Women's Equality	Conservative; Reform; Independence
Popular vote	147,873	132,873
Percentage	51.4%	46.1%
- County results Delgado: 40–50% 50–60% 60–70% Faso: 40–50% 50–60% 60–70%
U.S. Representative before election
John Faso
Republican
Elected U.S. Representative
Antonio Delgado
Democratic

The 19th district is located in New York's Hudson Valley and Catskills regions and includes all of Columbia, Delaware, Greene, Otsego, Schoharie, Sullivan and Ulster counties, and parts of Broome, Dutchess, Montgomery and Rensselaer counties. The incumbent was Republican John Faso, who had represented the district since 2017. He was elected to replace retiring representative Chris Gibson with 54% of the vote in 2016. The Democratic nominee was Antonio Delgado. Actress Diane Neal ran under the newly created Friends of Diane Neal ballot line.

=== Democratic primary ===
New York's 19th district was included on the initial list of Republican-held seats being targeted by the Democratic Congressional Campaign Committee in 2018.

==== Candidates ====
===== Nominee =====
- Antonio Delgado, attorney

===== Eliminated in primary =====
- Jeff Beals, teacher and former U.S. diplomat
- David Clegg, lawyer
- Erin Collier, economist
- Brian Flynn, businessman
- Gareth Rhodes, former gubernatorial aide
- Pat Ryan, Iraq War veteran and businessman

===== Withdrawn =====
- Sue Sullivan, strategic planning consultant

===== Declined =====
- Mike Hein, Ulster County Executive
- Zephyr Teachout, candidate for governor in 2014 and nominee for this seat in 2016
- Will Yandik, Livingston Deputy Supervisor and candidate for this seat in 2016

==== Polling ====
Poll source	Date(s) administered	Sample size	Margin of error	Jeff Beals	Dave Clegg	Erin Collier	Antonio Delgado	Brian Flynn	Gareth Rhodes	Pat Ryan	Other	Undecided
Change Research (D-Collier)	June 16–17, 2018	319	—	9%	5%	5%	21%	14%	4%	14%	—	27%

==== Results ====
Results by county: Delgado: 20–30%; 30–40%; Ryan: 20–30%; Rhodes: 20–30%; Flynn: 20–30%; 30–40%

Democratic primary results
Party	Candidate	Votes	%
Democratic	Antonio Delgado	8,576	22.1
Democratic	Pat Ryan	6,941	17.9
Democratic	Gareth Rhodes	6,890	17.7
Democratic	Brian Flynn	5,245	13.5
Democratic	Jeff Beals	4,991	12.9
Democratic	David Clegg	4,257	11.0
Democratic	Erin Collier	1,908	4.9
Total votes		38,808	100.0

=== Republican primary ===
- John Faso, incumbent

=== Independent candidates ===
Declared

- Diane Neal, actress

Disqualified

- Dal LaMagna, businessman

=== General election ===
==== Predictions ====
Source	Ranking	As of
The Cook Political Report	Tossup	November 5, 2018
Inside Elections	Tilt D (flip)	November 5, 2018
Sabato's Crystal Ball	Lean D (flip)	November 5, 2018
RCP	Tossup	November 5, 2018
Daily Kos	Tossup	November 5, 2018
538	Lean D (flip)	November 7, 2018

==== Endorsements ====
John Faso (R)

U.S. Executive Branch officials

- Donald Trump, 45th President of the United States

Organizations

- National Federation of Independent Business
Antonio Delgado (D)

U.S. Executive Branch officials

- Barack Obama, 44th President of the United States

State legislators

- John R. Dunne, former state senator (Republican)

Labor unions

- 1199SEIU United Healthcare Workers East
- New York State United Teachers

Newspapers

- The New York Times

==== Debates ====
- Complete video of debate, October 19, 2018

==== Polling ====
Poll source	Date(s) administered	Sample size	Margin of error	John Faso (R)	Antonio Delgado (D)	Other	Undecided
NYT Upshot/Siena College	November 1–4, 2018	505	± 4.8%	42%	43%	7%	8%
SurveyUSA	October 26–29, 2018	609	± 4.2%	44%	44%	6%	6%
Monmouth University	October 24–28, 2018	372	± 5.1%	44%	49%	3%	4%
Siena College	October 12–16, 2018	500	± 4.6%	44%	43%	6%	7%
Monmouth University	September 6–10, 2018	327 LV	± 5.4%	45%	48%	2%	5%
Monmouth University	September 6–10, 2018	401 RV	± 4.9%	43%	45%	3%	9%
Siena College	August 20–26, 2018	501	± 4.8%	45%	40%	1%	13%
IMGE Insights (R)	July 9–12, 2018	400	–	49%	44%	–	7%
DCCC (D)	June 27–28, 2018	545	± 4.2%	42%	49%	–	–
Public Policy Polling (D)	May 4–7, 2018	928	± 3.2%	42%	42%	–	16%

Hypothetical polling

Poll source	Date(s) administered	Sample size	Margin of error	John Faso (R)	Generic Democrat	Other	Undecided
PPP/Patriot Majority USA	February 12–13, 2018	703	± 3.7%	41%	43%	–	16%
PPP/Patriot Majority USA	November 8–10, 2017	506	± 4.4%	40%	46%	–	14%

==== Results ====
New York's 19th congressional district, 2018
Party	Candidate	Votes	%
Democratic	Antonio Delgado	135,582	47.1
Working Families	Antonio Delgado	9,237	3.2
Women's Equality	Antonio Delgado	3,054	1.1
Total	Antonio Delgado	147,873	51.4
Republican	John Faso	112,304	39.0
Conservative	John Faso	16,906	5.9
Independence	John Faso	3,009	1.0
Reform	John Faso	654	0.2
Total	John Faso (incumbent)	132,873	46.1
Green	Steven Greenfield	4,313	1.5
Independent	Diane Neal	2,835	1.0
Total votes		287,894	100.0
Democratic gain from Republican			

== District 20 ==
2018 New York's 20th congressional district election
- November 6, 2018
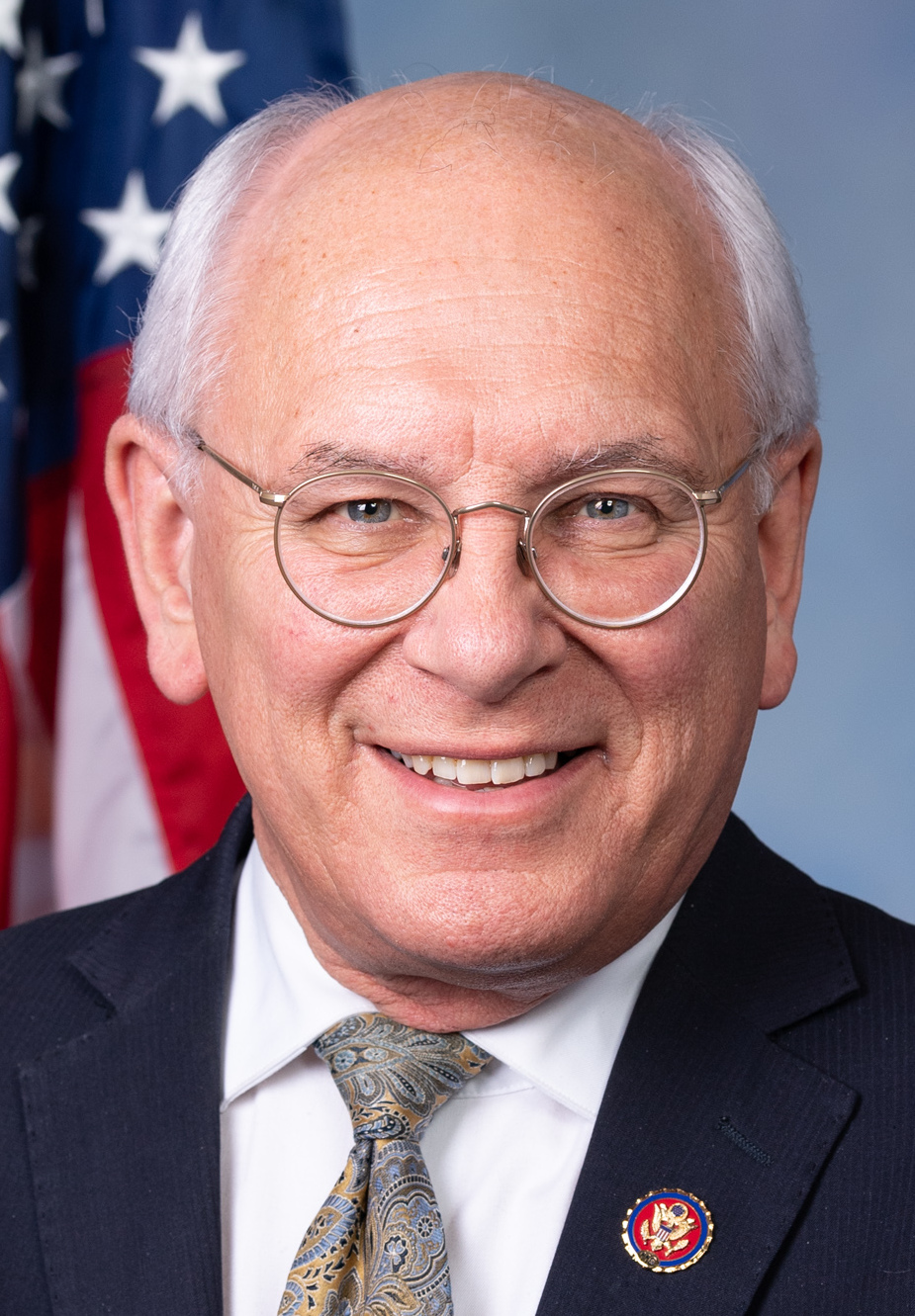

Nominee	Paul Tonko	Joe Vitollo
Party	Democratic	Republican
Alliance	Working Families; Women's Equality; Reform
Popular vote	176,811	89,058
Percentage	66.5%	33.5%
- County results Tonk: 50–60% 60–70% 70–80%
U.S. Representative before election
Paul Tonko
Democratic
Elected U.S. Representative
Paul Tonko
Democratic

The 20th district is located in the Capital District and includes all of Albany and Schenectady Counties, and portions of Montgomery, Rensselaer and Saratoga Counties. The incumbent was Democrat Paul Tonko, who had represented the district since 2013 and previously represented the 21st district from 2009 to 2013. He was re-elected to a fifth term with 68% of the vote in 2016.

=== Democratic primary ===
==== Candidates ====
===== Nominee =====
- Paul Tonko, incumbent U.S. Representative

=== Republican primary ===
==== Candidates ====
===== Nominee =====
- Joe Vitollo, nurse and Republican nominee in 2016

=== General election ===
==== Predictions ====
Source	Ranking	As of
The Cook Political Report	Safe D	November 5, 2018
Inside Elections	Safe D	November 5, 2018
Sabato's Crystal Ball	Safe D	November 5, 2018
RCP	Safe D	November 5, 2018
Daily Kos	Safe D	November 5, 2018
538	Safe D	November 7, 2018

==== Endorsements ====
Paul Tonko (D)

Labor unions

- 1199SEIU United Healthcare Workers East
- New York State United Teachers

==== Results ====
New York's 20th congressional district, 2018
Party	Candidate	Votes	%
Democratic	Paul Tonko	161,330	60.7
Working Families	Paul Tonko	10,129	3.8
Women's Equality	Paul Tonko	3,712	1.4
Reform	Paul Tonko	1,640	0.6
Total	Paul Tonko (incumbent)	176,811	66.5
Republican	Joe Vitollo	89,058	33.5
Total votes		265,869	100.0
Democratic hold			

== District 21 ==
2018 New York's 21st congressional district election
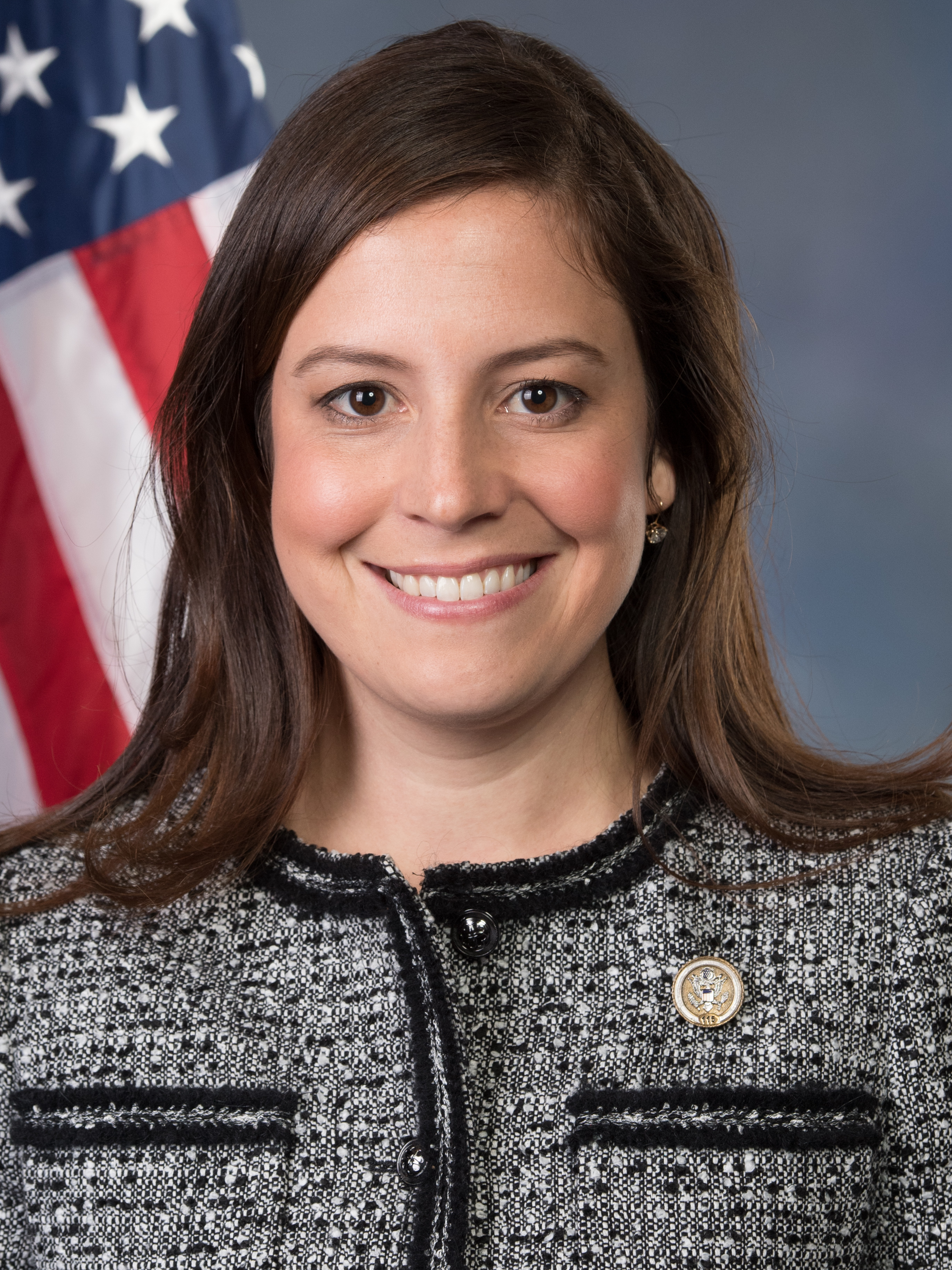

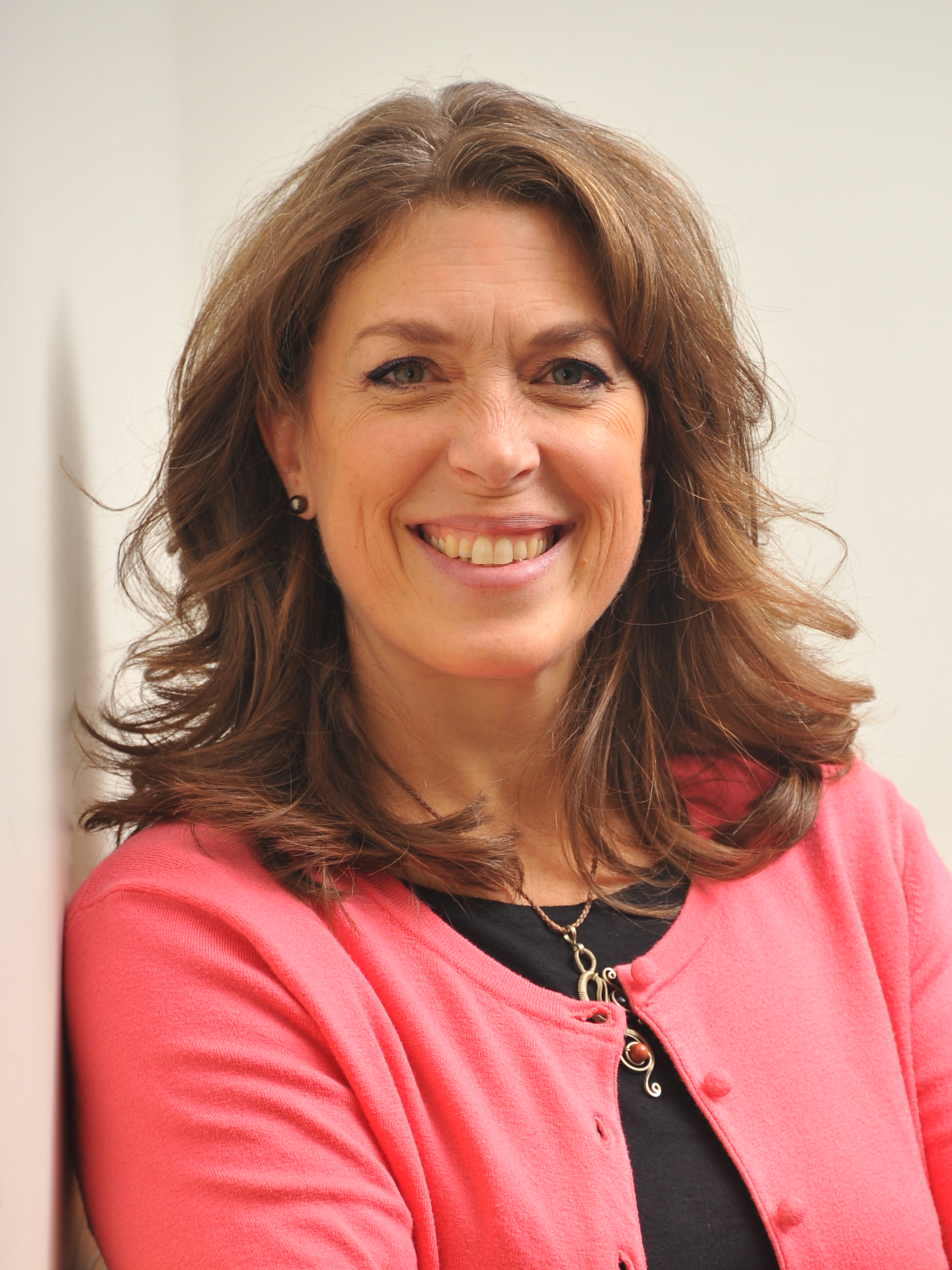
Nominee	Elise Stefanik	Tedra Cobb
Party	Republican	Democratic
Alliance	Conservative; Independence; Reform	Working Families; Women's Equality
Popular vote	131,981	99,791
Percentage	56.1%	42.4%
- County results Stefanik: 50–60% 60–70% Cobb: 40–50%
U.S. Representative before election
Elise Stefanik
Republican
Elected U.S. Representative
Elise Stefanik
Republican

The 21st district, the state's largest and most rural congressional district, includes most of the North Country and the northern suburbs of Syracuse. The district borders Vermont to the east. The incumbent was Republican Elise Stefanik, who had represented the district since 2015. She was re-elected to a second term with 65.3% of the vote in 2016.

=== Republican primary ===
Farmer and real estate broker Russ Finley planned on making a primary challenge of Stefanik, but later withdrew from the race, leaving Stefanik unopposed in the primary.

==== Candidates ====
===== Nominee =====
- Elise Stefanik, incumbent U.S. Representative

===== Withdrawn =====
- Russ Finle, farmer and real estate broker

=== Democratic primary ===
==== Candidates ====
===== Nominee =====
- Tedra Cobb, former St. Lawrence County legislator

===== Eliminated in primary =====
- Don Boyajian, attorney and former congressional aide
- Emily Martz, economic development adviser
- Patrick Nelson, biochemist, campaign director for Democratic nominee Mike Derrick in 2016, candidate for Stillwater Town Board in 2015
- Dylan Ratigan, businessman, author, film producer, The Young Turks political commentator and former MSNBC host
- Katie Wilson, antiques store owner

===== Declined =====
- Mike Derrick, retired Army Colonel and nominee in 2016
- Martha Devaney
- Dylan Hewitt, project consultant for the Clinton Foundation
- Aaron Woolf, filmmaker and nominee in 2014

==== Debate ====
2018 New York's 21st congressional district democratic primary debate
No.	Date	Host	Moderator	Link	Democratic	Democratic	Democratic	Democratic	Democratic	Democratic
Key: P Participant A Absent N Not invited I Invited W Withdrawn										
Key: P Participant A Absent N Not invited I Invited W Withdrawn					Don Boyajian	Tedra Cobb	Emily Martz	Patrick Nelson	Dylan Ratigan	Katie Wilson
1	Jun. 14, 2016	WCFE-TV			N	P	P	P	P	P

==== Results ====
Democratic primary results
Party	Candidate	Votes	%
Democratic	Tedra Cobb	10,853	55.3
Democratic	Katie Wilson	2,356	12.0
Democratic	Dylan Ratigan	2,313	11.8
Democratic	Emily Martz	2,165	11.0
Democratic	Patrick Nelson	1,802	9.2
Democratic	Don Boyajian	129	0.7
Total votes		19,618	100.0

=== Green primary ===
Past Green Party nominee Matt Funiciello announced that he would not run in 2018. Lynn Kahn was the Green Party candidate in 2018.

=== General election ===
==== Predictions ====
Source	Ranking	As of
The Cook Political Report	Likely R	November 5, 2018
Inside Elections	Safe R	November 5, 2018
Sabato's Crystal Ball	Likely R	November 5, 2018
RCP	Safe R	November 5, 2018
Daily Kos	Likely R	November 5, 2018
538	Likely R	November 7, 2018

==== Endorsements ====
Tedra Cobb (D)

Labor unions

- 1199SEIU United Healthcare Workers East
- New York State United Teachers

==== Debate ====
2018 New York's 21st congressional district debate
No.	Date	Host	Moderator	Link	Republican	Democratic	Green
Key: P Participant A Absent N Not invited I Invited W Withdrawn							
Key: P Participant A Absent N Not invited I Invited W Withdrawn					Elise Stefanik	Tedra Cobb	Lynn Kahn
1	Oct. 23, 2018	WCFE-TV	Thom Hallock		P	P	P

==== Results ====
New York's 21st congressional district, 2018
Party	Candidate	Votes	%
Republican	Elise Stefanik	116,433	49.5
Conservative	Elise Stefanik	11,398	4.9
Independence	Elise Stefanik	3,369	1.4
Reform	Elise Stefanik	781	0.3
Total	Elise Stefanik (incumbent)	131,981	56.1
Democratic	Tedra Cobb	93,394	39.7
Working Families	Tedra Cobb	4,425	1.8
Women's Equality	Tedra Cobb	1,972	0.9
Total	Tedra Cobb	99,791	42.4
Green	Lynn Kahn	3,437	1.5
Total votes		235,267	100.0
Republican hold			

== District 22 ==
2018 New York's 22nd congressional district election
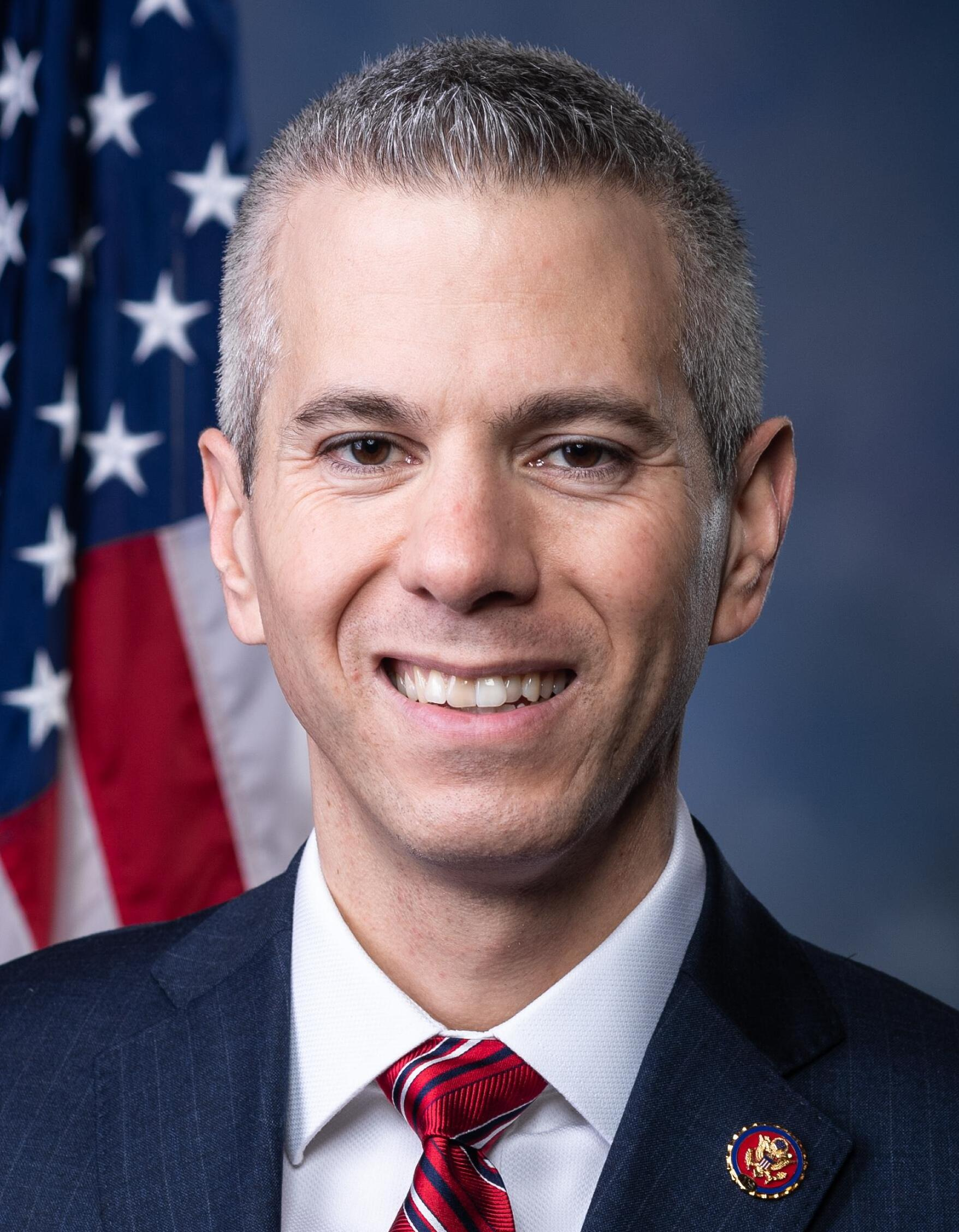

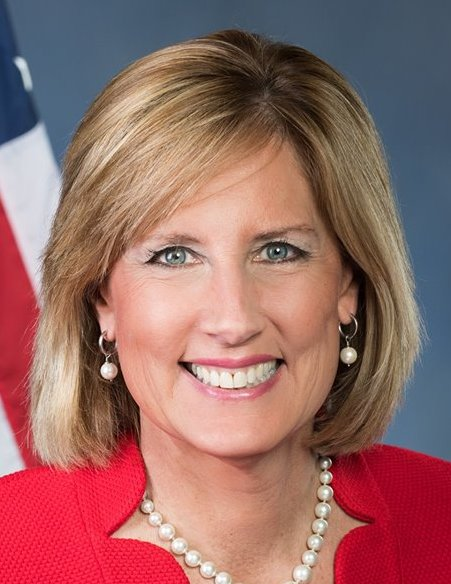
Nominee	Anthony Brindisi	Claudia Tenney
Party	Democratic	Republican
Alliance	Independence; Working Families; Women's Equality	Conservative; Reform
Popular vote	127,715	123,242
Percentage	50.9%	49.1%
- County results Brindisi: 50–60% Tenney: 50–60% 60–70%
U.S. Representative before election
Claudia Tenney
Republican
Elected U.S. Representative
Anthony Brindisi
Democratic

The 22nd district is located in Central New York and includes all of Chenango, Cortland, Madison and Oneida counties, and parts of Broome, Herkimer, Oswego and Tioga counties. The incumbent was Republican Claudia Tenney, who had represented the district since 2017. She was elected to replace retiring representative Richard Hanna with 47% of the vote in 2016.

=== Republican primary ===
==== Candidates ====
===== Nominee =====
- Claudia Tenney, incumbent U.S. Representative

=== Democratic primary ===
New York's 22nd district was included on the initial list of Republican-held seats being targeted by the Democratic Congressional Campaign Committee in 2018.

==== Candidates ====
===== Nominee =====
- Anthony Brindisi, state assembly member

=== General election ===
==== Predictions ====
Source	Ranking	As of
The Cook Political Report	Tossup	November 5, 2018
Inside Elections	Tilt D (flip)	November 5, 2018
Sabato's Crystal Ball	Lean D (flip)	November 5, 2018
RCP	Tossup	November 5, 2018
Daily Kos	Tossup	November 5, 2018
538	Tossup	November 7, 2018

==== Endorsements ====
Claudia Tenney (R)

U.S. Executive Branch officials

- Donald Trump, President of the United States

Organizations

- National Federation of Independent Business

Newspapers

- New York Post

Individuals

- Oliver North, President of the National Rifle Association of America
- Donald Trump Jr, businessman and son of U.S. President Donald Trump
- Eric Trump, businessman and son of U.S. President Donald Trump
Anthony Brindisi (D)

U.S. Representatives

- Sherwood Boehlert, former U.S. Representative from NY-24 (Republican)
- Richard L. Hanna, former U.S. Representative from NY-22 (Republican)

Labor unions

- 1199SEIU United Healthcare Workers East
- New York State AFL-CIO
- New York State United Teachers

Organizations

- End Citizens United
- Giffords
- League of Conservation Voters
- NARAL Pro-Choice America
- U.S. Chamber of Commerce

Newspapers

- The New York Times
- The Post-Standard

==== Debate ====
2018 New York's 2nd congressional district debate
No.	Date	Host	Moderator	Link	Republican	Democratic
Key: P Participant A Absent N Not invited I Invited W Withdrawn						
Key: P Participant A Absent N Not invited I Invited W Withdrawn					Claudia Tenney	Anthony Brindisi
1	Nov. 1, 2018	Leagues of Women Voters of Broome & Tioga Counties; WSKG-TV	Charles Compton		P	P

==== Polling ====
Poll source	Date(s) administered	Sample size	Margin of error	Claudia Tenney (R)	Anthony Brindisi (D)	Other	Undecided
NYT Upshot/Siena College	November 1–4, 2018	506	± 4.7%	46%	45%	–	9%
Siena College	October 15–18, 2018	501	± 4.7%	45%	46%	–	9%
The Polling Company (R-Citizens United)	October 12–13, 2018	400	± 4.9%	50%	42%	1%	7%
Siena College	August 20–26, 2018	499	± 4.8%	44%	46%	1%	9%
Zogby Analytics	April 23–27, 2018	358	± 5.2%	40%	47%	–	13%
GQR Research (D)	March 8–12, 2018	500	–	44%	50%	–	–
Public Policy Polling (D)	November 9–10, 2017	599	± 4.0%	41%	47%	–	12%
DCCC (D)	October 10, 2017	561	± 4.1%	43%	45%	–	12%

==== Results ====
New York's 22nd congressional district, 2018
Party	Candidate	Votes	%
Democratic	Anthony Brindisi	116,001	46.2
Independence	Anthony Brindisi	5,673	2.3
Working Families	Anthony Brindisi	4,651	1.9
Women's Equality	Anthony Brindisi	1,390	0.5
Total	Anthony Brindisi	127,715	50.9
Republican	Claudia Tenney	110,125	43.9
Conservative	Claudia Tenney	12,061	4.8
Reform	Claudia Tenney	1,056	0.4
Total	Claudia Tenney (incumbent)	123,242	49.1
Total votes		250,957	100.0
Democratic gain from Republican			

== District 23 ==
2018 New York's 23rd congressional district election
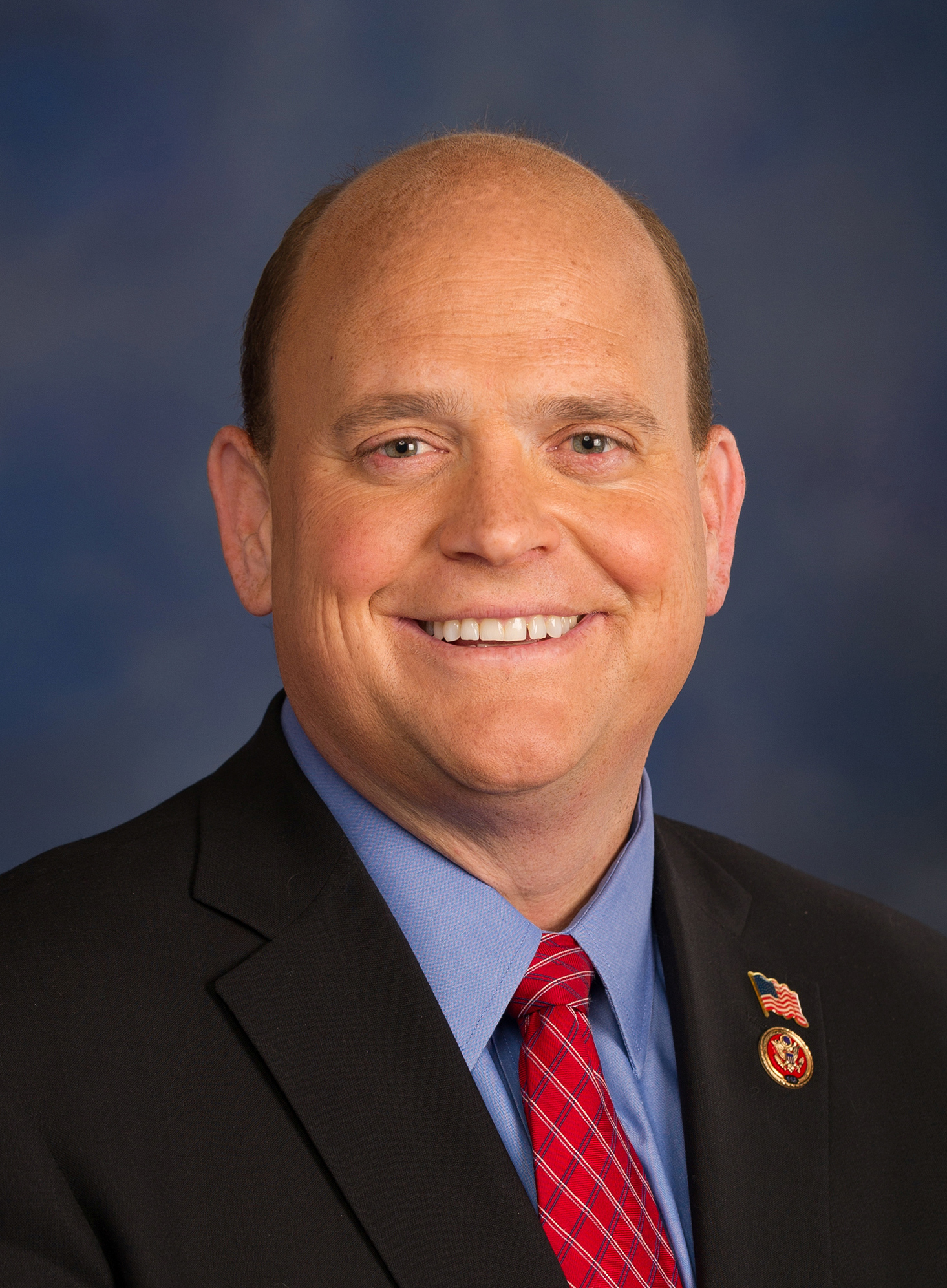

Nominee	Tom Reed	Tracy Mitrano
Party	Republican	Democratic
Alliance	Independence; Conservative	Working Families; Women's Equality
Popular vote	130,323	109,932
Percentage	54.2%	45.8%
- County results Reed: 50–60% 60–70% Mitrano: 70–80%
U.S. Representative before election
Tom Reed
Republican
Elected U.S. Representative
Tom Reed
Republican

The 23rd district includes all of Allegany, Cattaraugus, Chautauqua, Chemung, Schuyler, Seneca, Steuben, Tompkins and Yates counties, along with parts of Ontario and Tioga counties. The incumbent was Republican Tom Reed, who had represented the district since 2013 and previously represented the 29th district from 2009 to 2013. He was re-elected to a fifth term with 58% of the vote in 2016.

=== Republican primary ===
==== Candidates ====
===== Nominee =====
- Tom Reed, incumbent U.S. Representative

=== Democratic primary ===
==== Candidates ====
===== Nominee =====
- Tracy Mitrano, Interim Director of the Executive Master's Program of the Park School of Communications at Ithaca College

===== Eliminated in primary =====
- Max Della Pia, retired Air Force officer
- Ian Golden, businessman
- Eddie Sundquist, attorney

===== Declined =====
- Paolo Cremidis, Democratic organizer and New York State Young Democrats Rural Caucus chair
- Jason Leifer, Dryden Town Supervisor
- John F. Plumb, nominee in 2016

==== Results ====
Although Della Pia finished slightly ahead of the other candidates on primary election night, he conceded to Mitrano after absentee ballots were counted.

Democratic primary results
Party	Candidate	Votes	%
Democratic	Tracy Mitrano	7,724	32.9
Democratic	Max Della Pia	7,494	31.9
Democratic	Linda Andrei	3,603	15.3
Democratic	Ian Golden	3,142	13.4
Democratic	Eddie Sundquist	1,538	6.5
Total votes		23,501	100.0

=== Women's Equality primary ===
Tracy Mitrano ran unopposed for the Women's Equality Party nomination.

==== Results ====
Women's Equality Party primary results
Party	Candidate	Votes	%
Women's Equality	Tracy Mitrano	4	100.0
Total votes		4	100.0

=== General election ===
==== Predictions ====
Source	Ranking	As of
The Cook Political Report	Likely R	November 5, 2018
Inside Elections	Safe R	November 5, 2018
Sabato's Crystal Ball	Likely R	November 5, 2018
RCP	Safe R	November 5, 2018
Daily Kos	Likely R	November 5, 2018
538	Likely R	November 7, 2018

==== Endorsements ====
Tom Reed (R)

U.S. Executive Branch officials

- Donald Trump, President of the United States

Organizations

- Citizens for Responsible Energy Solutions
- National Federation of Independent Business

Newspapers

- The Buffalo News
Tracy Mitrano (D)

Labor unions

- 1199SEIU United Healthcare Workers East
- New York State United Teachers

Newspapers

- The Cornell Daily Sun

Local officials

- Svante Myrick, Mayor of Ithaca

==== Polling ====
Poll source	Date(s) administered	Sample size	Margin of error	Tom Reed (R)	Tracy Mitrano (D)	Undecided
Change Research (D-Mitrano)	October 23–24, 2018	510	–	49%	47%	–

==== Results ====
New York's 23rd congressional district, 2018
Party	Candidate	Votes	%
Republican	Tom Reed	114,722	47.7
Conservative	Tom Reed	12,274	5.1
Independence	Tom Reed	3,327	1.4
Total	Tom Reed (incumbent)	130,323	54.2
Democratic	Tracy Mitrano	100,914	42.0
Working Families	Tracy Mitrano	6,464	2.7
Women's Equality	Tracy Mitrano	2,554	1.1
Total	Tracy Mitrano	109,932	45.8
Total votes		240,255	100.0
Republican hold			

== District 24 ==
2018 New York's 24th congressional district election
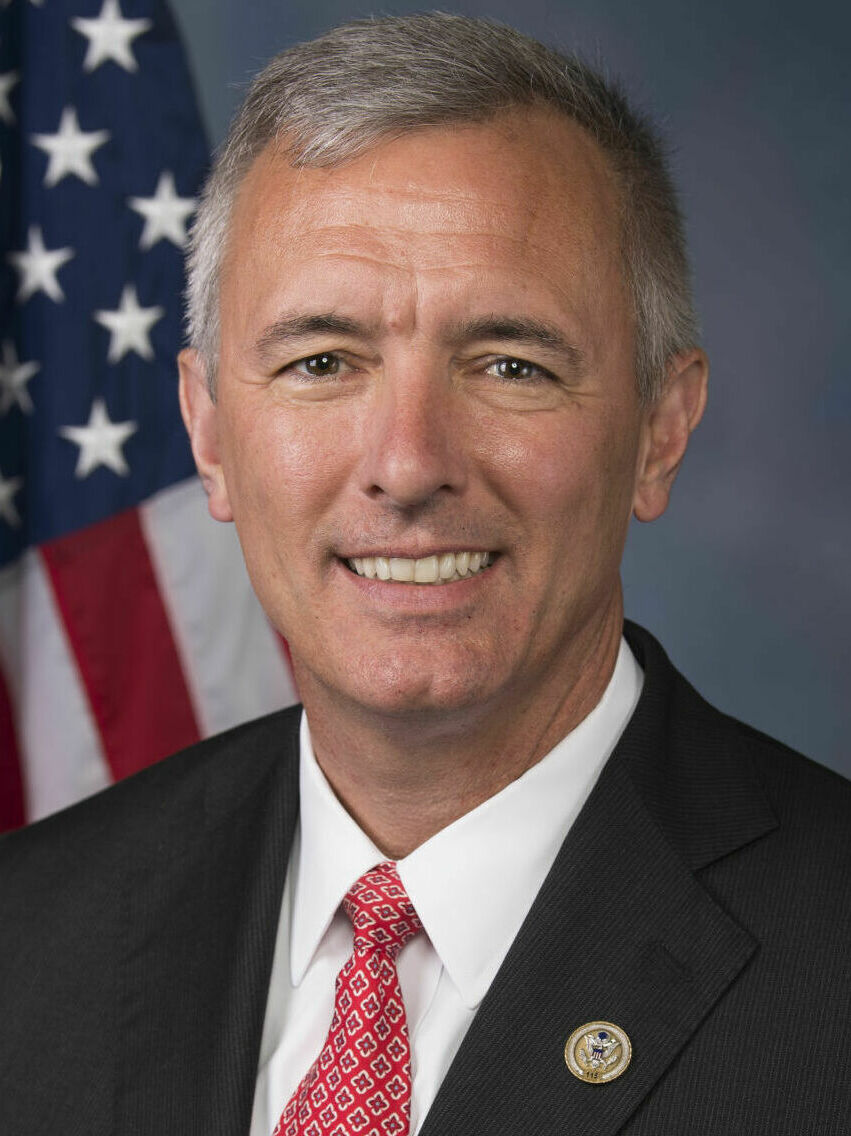

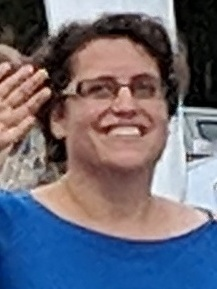
Nominee	John Katko	Dana Balter
Party	Republican	Democratic
Alliance	Independence; Conservative; Reform	Working Families; Women's Equality
Popular vote	136,920	123,226
Percentage	52.6%	47.4%
- County results Katko: 60–70% Balter: 50–60%
U.S. Representative before election
John Katko
Republican
Elected U.S. Representative
John Katko
Republican

The 24th district includes all of Cayuga, Onondaga and Wayne counties, and the western part of Oswego County. The incumbent was Republican John Katko, who had represented the district since 2015. He was re-elected to a second term with 61% of the vote in 2016.

=== Republican primary ===
==== Candidates ====
===== Nominee =====
- John Katko, incumbent U.S. Representative

=== Democratic primary ===
New York's 24th district was included on the initial list of Republican-held seats being targeted by the Democratic Congressional Campaign Committee in 2018.

==== Candidates ====
===== Nominee =====
- Dana Balter, Syracuse University professor

===== Eliminated in primary =====
- Juanita Perez Williams, former Syracuse mayoral candidate

===== Declined =====
- Eric Kingson, professor and candidate in 2016
- Phil LaTessa, former Syracuse City Auditor
- Steve Michaels, attorney
- Stephanie Miner, Mayor of Syracuse
- Chris Ryan, Onondaga County legislator
- Steve Williams, attorney and candidate in 2016

==== Polling ====
Poll source	Date(s) administered	Sample size	Margin of error	Dana Balter (D)	Juanita Perez Williams (D)	Other	Undecided
Siena College	June 10–12, 2018	513	± 4.5%	32%	45%	–	23%

==== Results ====
Democratic primary results
Party	Candidate	Votes	%
Democratic	Dana Balter	14,897	62.4
Democratic	Juanita Perez Williams	8,958	37.6
Total votes		23,855	100.0

=== General election ===
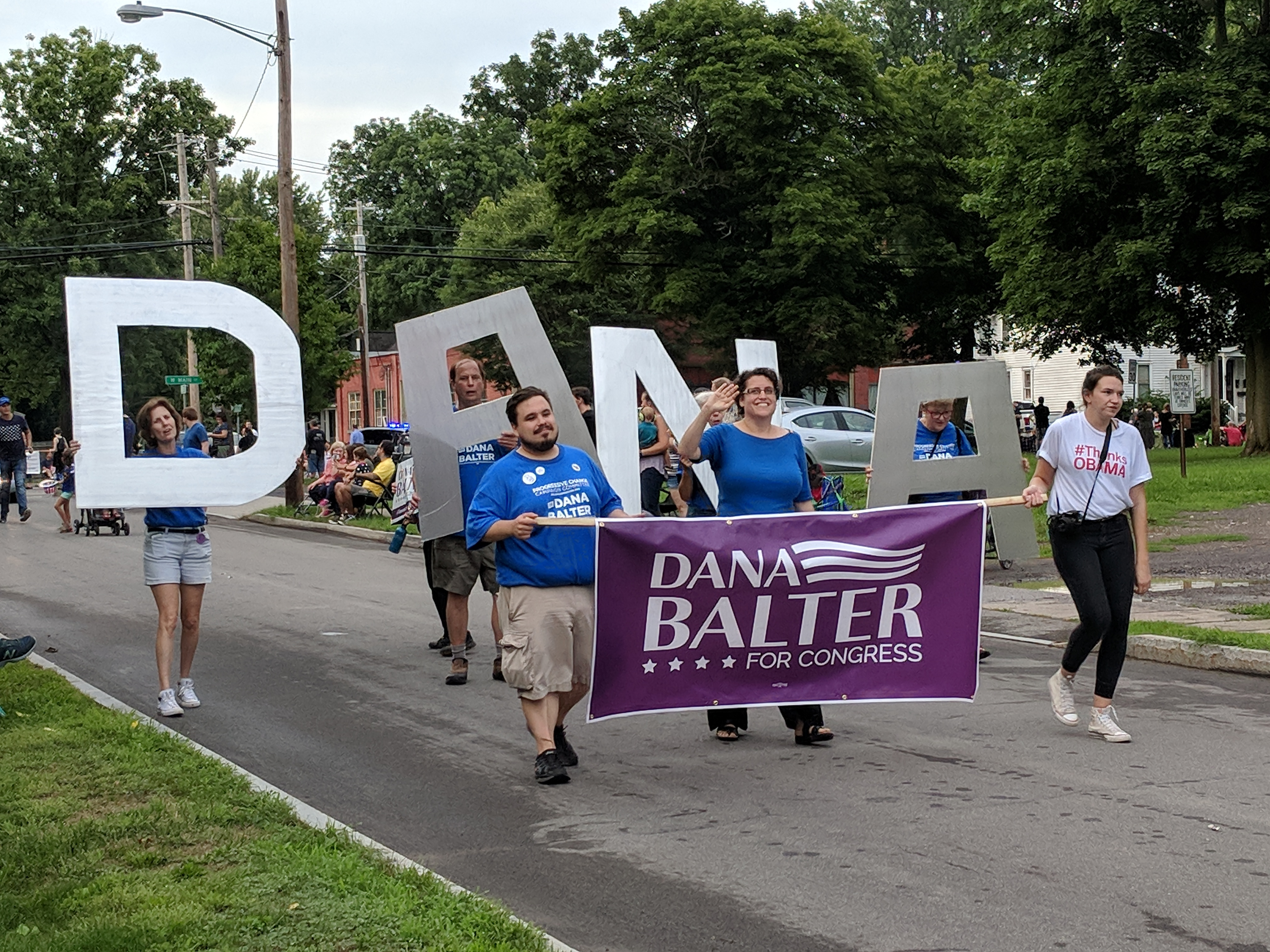
Balter campaigning in Palmyra

==== Predictions ====
Source	Ranking	As of
The Cook Political Report	Lean R	November 5, 2018
Inside Elections	Lean R	November 5, 2018
Sabato's Crystal Ball	Lean R	November 5, 2018
RCP	Likely R	November 5, 2018
Daily Kos	Lean R	November 5, 2018
538	Likely R	November 7, 2018

==== Endorsements ====
Dana Balter (D)

Labor unions

- 1199SEIU United Healthcare Workers East
- New York State United Teachers

==== Polling ====
Poll source	Date(s) administered	Sample size	Margin of error	John Katko (R)	Dana Balter (D)	Undecided
Siena College	October 18–22, 2018	500	± 4.6%	53%	39%	8%
Siena College	August 20–23, 2018	513	± 4.7%	54%	39%	7%
Public Policy Polling (D)	July 26–27, 2018	785	–	43%	47%	10%

==== Results ====
New York's 24th congressional district, 2018
Party	Candidate	Votes	%
Republican	John Katko	113,538	43.6
Conservative	John Katko	16,972	6.5
Independence	John Katko	5,454	2.1
Reform	John Katko	956	0.4
Total	John Katko (incumbent)	136,920	52.6
Democratic	Dana Balter	115,902	44.6
Working Families	Dana Balter	4,784	1.8
Women's Equality	Dana Balter	2,540	1.0
Total	Dana Balter	123,226	47.4
Total votes		260,146	100.0
Republican hold			

== District 25 ==
2018 New York's 25th congressional district election
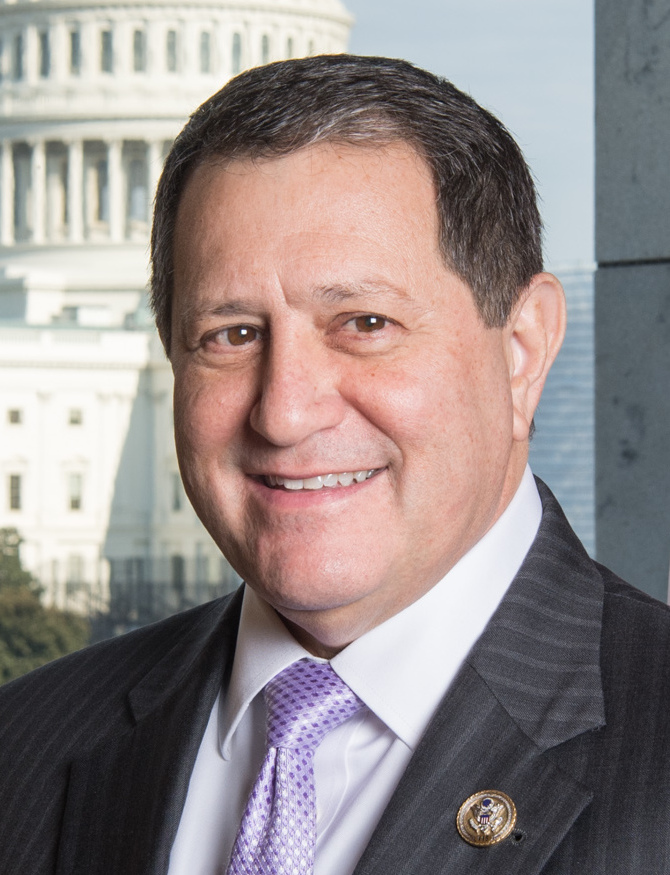

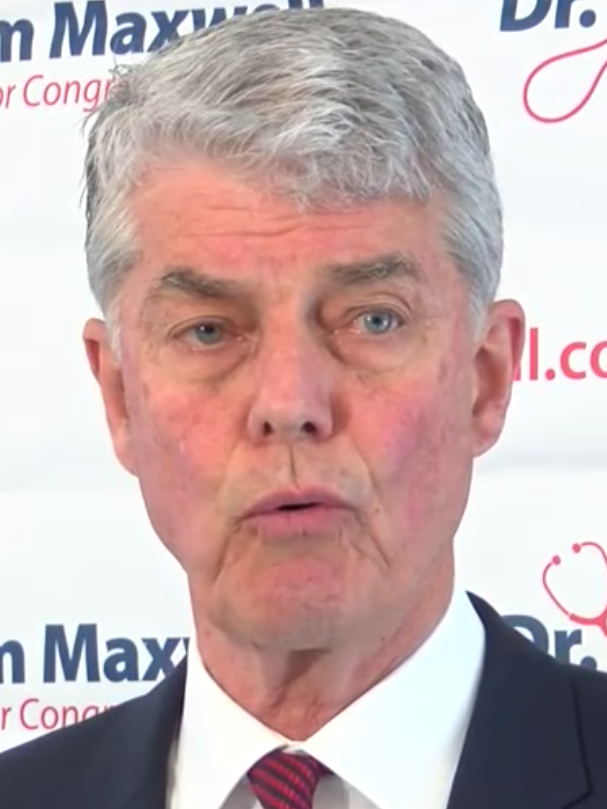
Nominee	Joseph Morelle	Jim Maxwell
Party	Democratic	Republican
Alliance	Working Families; Women's Equility; Independence	Conservative; Reform
Popular vote	159,244	110,736
Percentage	59.0%	41.0%
- County results Morelle: 50–60%
U.S. Representative before election
Joseph Morelle
Democratic
Elected U.S. Representative
Joseph Morelle
Democratic

The 25th district is located entirely within Monroe County, centered on the city of Rochester. The seat was vacant due to the March 2018 death of incumbent Democratic representative Louise Slaughter, who represented the district from 2013 to 2018 and previously represented the 28th district from 1993 to 2013 and the 30th district from 1987 to 1993.

Following precedent set in 2010, two concurrent elections were held in November 2018. One election was held to fill the seat for the 2018 lame-duck session, and another was held to fill the seat for the 2019–2020 term.

=== Democratic primary ===
==== Candidates ====
===== Nominee =====
- Joseph Morelle, New York State Assembly Majority Leader

===== Eliminated in primary =====
- Rachel Barnhart, former television journalist
- Adam McFadden, Rochester City Council member
- Robin Wilt, Brighton town board member

===== Withdrawn =====
- Andrew Gilchrist, teacher

==== Debate ====
2018 New York's 25th congressional district democratic primary debate
No.	Date	Host	Moderator	Link	Democratic	Democratic	Democratic	Democratic
Key: P Participant A Absent N Not invited I Invited W Withdrawn								
Key: P Participant A Absent N Not invited I Invited W Withdrawn					Rachel Barnhart	Adam McFadden	Joseph Morelle	Robin Wilt
1	Oct. 21, 2018	WXXI-TV	Evan Dawson		P	P	P	P

==== Results ====
Democratic primary results
Party	Candidate	Votes	%
Democratic	Joseph Morelle	16,245	45.7
Democratic	Rachel Barnhart	7,003	19.7
Democratic	Robin Wilt	6,158	17.3
Democratic	Adam McFadden	6,103	17.2
Total votes		35,509	100.0

=== Republican primary ===
==== Candidates ====
===== Nominee =====
- Jim Maxwell, neurosurgeon

=== General election ===
==== Predictions ====
Source	Ranking	As of
The Cook Political Report	Safe D	November 5, 2018
Inside Elections	Safe D	November 5, 2018
Sabato's Crystal Ball	Safe D	November 5, 2018
RCP	Safe D	November 5, 2018
Daily Kos	Safe D	November 5, 2018
538	Safe D	November 7, 2018

==== Debate ====
2018 New York's 25th congressional district debate
No.	Date	Host	Moderator	Link	Democratic	Republican
Key: P Participant A Absent N Not invited I Invited W Withdrawn						
Key: P Participant A Absent N Not invited I Invited W Withdrawn					Joseph Morelle	Jim Maxwell
1	Oct. 25, 2018	WXXI-TV	Evan Dawson		P	P

==== Endorsements ====
Joseph Morelle (D)

State officials

- Andrew Cuomo, Governor of New York

Labor unions

- 1199SEIU United Healthcare Workers East
- American Federation of Government Employees
- New York State United Teachers
- United Steelworkers
- Workers United

Organizations

- Congressional Progressive Caucus
- NARAL Pro-Choice America

Newspapers

- City Newspaper

==== Polling ====
Poll source	Date(s) administered	Sample size	Margin of error	Joseph Morelle (D)	Jim Maxwell (R)	Undecided
Dixie Strategies	October 29–30, 2018	843	± 3.37%	49%	39%	12%
Siena College	October 4–8, 2018	465	± 4.7%	53%	36%	11%
Siena College	August 15–19, 2018	500	± 4.4%	55%	31%	13%

==== Results ====
New York's 25th congressional district, 2018
Party	Candidate	Votes	%
Democratic	Joseph Morelle	147,979	54.8
Independence	Joseph Morelle	4,585	1.7
Working Families	Joseph Morelle	4,575	1.7
Women's Equality	Joseph Morelle	2,105	0.8
Total	Joseph Morelle	159,244	59.0
Republican	Jim Maxwell	91,342	33.8
Conservative	Jim Maxwell	17,781	6.6
Reform	Jim Maxwell	1,613	0.6
Total	Jim Maxwell	110,736	41.0
Total votes		269,980	100.0
Democratic hold			

== District 26 ==
2018 New York's 26th congressional district election
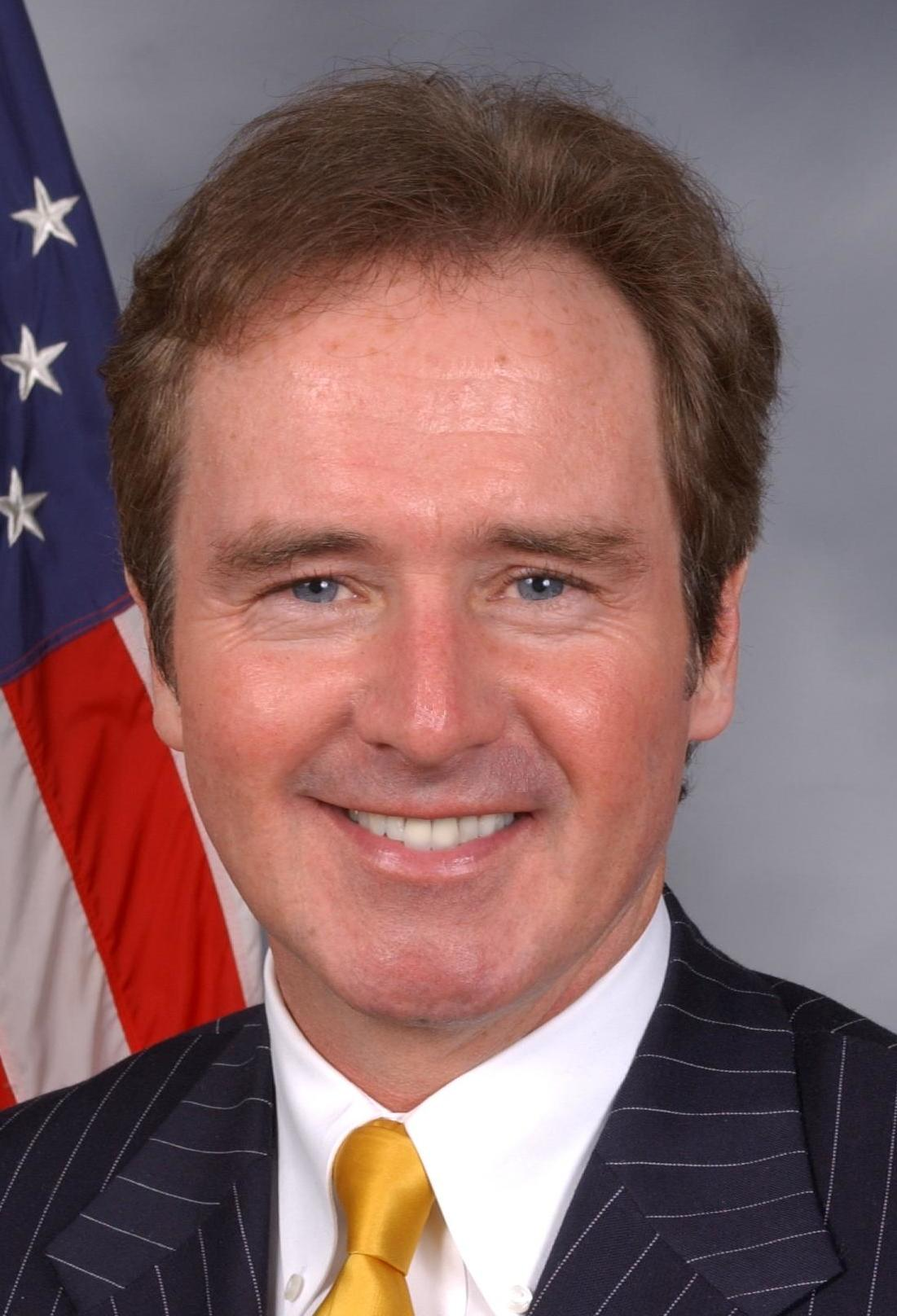

Nominee	Brian Higgins	Renee Zeno
Party	Democratic	Republican
Alliance	Working Families; Women's Equility
Popular vote	169,166	61,488
Percentage	73.3%	26.7%
- County results Higgins: 60–70% 70–80%
U.S. Representative before election
Brian Higgins
Democratic
Elected U.S. Representative
Brian Higgins
Democratic

The 26th district is located in Erie and Niagara counties and includes the cities of Buffalo and Niagara Falls. The incumbent was Democrat Brian Higgins, who had represented the district since 2013, and previously represented the 27th district from 2005 to 2013. He was re-elected to a seventh term with 75% of the vote in 2016.

=== Democratic primary ===
==== Candidates ====
===== Nominee =====
- Brian Higgins, incumbent U.S. Representative

=== Republican primary ===
==== Candidates ====
===== Nominee =====
- Renee Zeno, businesswoman

=== General election ===
==== Predictions ====
Source	Ranking	As of
The Cook Political Report	Safe D	November 5, 2018
Inside Elections	Safe D	November 5, 2018
Sabato's Crystal Ball	Safe D	November 5, 2018
RCP	Safe D	November 5, 2018
Daily Kos	Safe D	November 5, 2018
538	Safe D	November 7, 2018

==== Endorsements ====
Brian Higgins (D)

Labor unions

- 1199SEIU United Healthcare Workers East
- New York State United Teachers

==== Results ====
New York's 26th congressional district, 2018
Party	Candidate	Votes	%
Democratic	Brian Higgins	156,968	68.0
Working Families	Brian Higgins	8,929	3.9
Women's Equality	Brian Higgins	3,269	1.4
Total	Brian Higgins (incumbent)	169,166	73.3
Republican	Renee Zeno	61,488	26.7
Total votes		230,654	100.0
Democratic hold			

== District 27 ==
2018 New York's 27th congressional district election
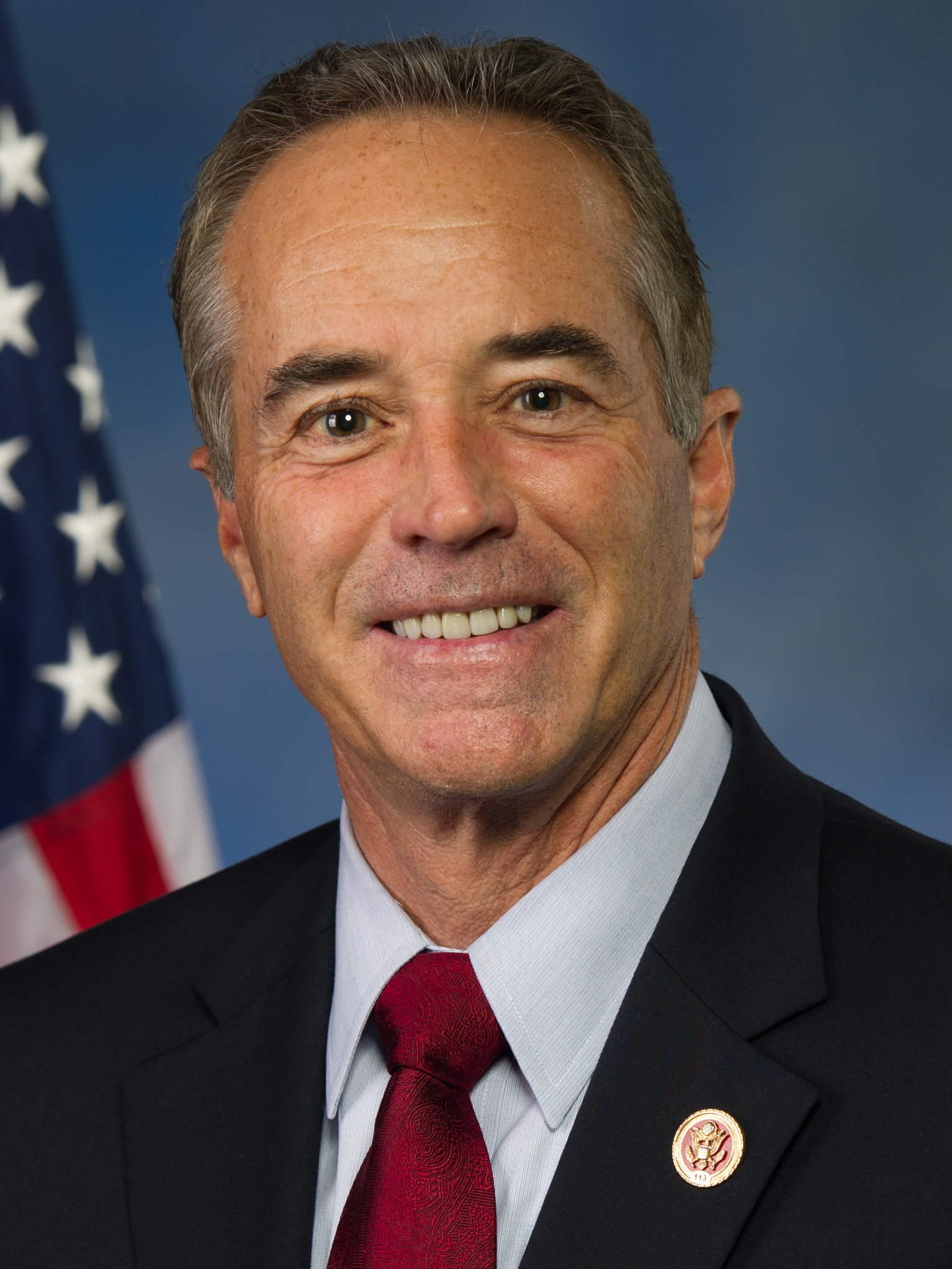

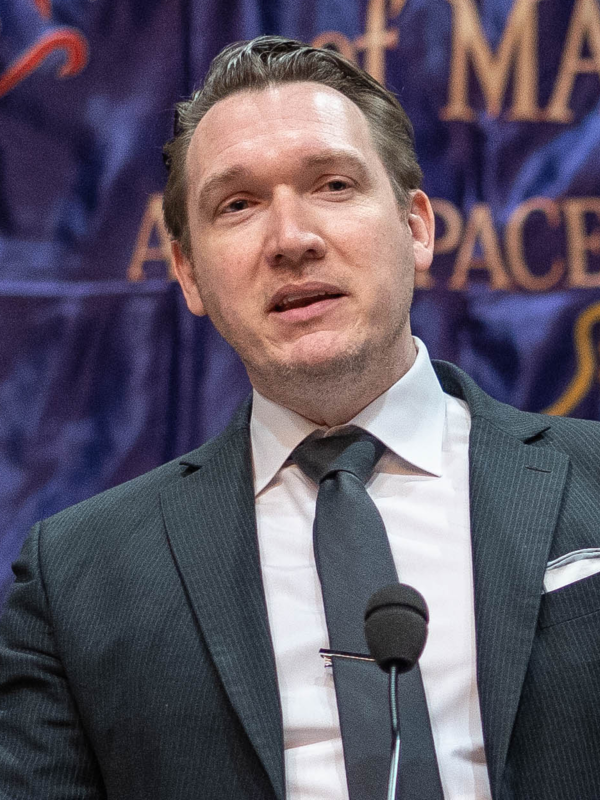
Nominee	Chris Collins	Nate McMurray
Party	Republican	Democratic
Alliance	Conservative; Independence	Working Families; Women's Equality
Popular vote	140,146	139,059
Percentage	49.1%	48.8%
- County results Collins: 40–50% 50–60% 60–70% McMurray: 50–60%
U.S. Representative before election
Chris Collins
Republican
Elected U.S. Representative
Chris Collins
Republican

The 27th district is located in Western New York and includes all of Orleans, Genesee, Wyoming and Livingston counties, and parts of Erie, Monroe, Niagara and Ontario counties.

Incumbent Republican Chris Collins, who had represented the district since 2013, ran for re-election. He was re-elected to a third term with 67% of the vote in 2016,

=== Republican primary ===
==== Candidates ====
===== Nominee =====
- Chris Collins, incumbent U.S. Representative

===== Withdrawn =====
- Larry Piegza, computer technician and entrepreneur; remained in election as nominee of the Reform Party
- Frank C. Smierciak II, medical payment worker

=== Democratic primary ===
New York's 27th district was included on the initial list of Republican-held seats being targeted by the Democratic Congressional Campaign Committee in 2018.

==== Candidates ====
===== Nominee =====
- Nate McMurray, Supervisor of Grand Island

===== Withdrawn =====
- Sean Bunny, prosecutor
- Erin Cole, U.S. Army veteran, former senior vice president of Global NY
- Nick Stankevich, businessman

=== General election ===
==== Predictions ====
Source	Ranking	As of
The Cook Political Report	Lean R	November 5, 2018
Inside Elections	Lean R	November 5, 2018
Sabato's Crystal Ball	Lean R	November 5, 2018
RCP	Lean R	November 5, 2018
Daily Kos	Lean R	November 5, 2018
538	Likely R	November 7, 2018

==== Campaign ====
On August 11, 2018, Collins announced that he would withdraw from his re-election campaign after being arrested for insider trading. Removing himself from the ballot would have required Collins to be nominated as a dummy candidate in another election or to move his legal place of residence out of state (he has additional homes in Florida and the District of Columbia). On September 17, 2018, Collins announced that he had changed course and would campaign for re-election in November after all.

===== Potential Republican replacements =====
Following Collins's August 11 announcement that he would withdraw from the race, as many as 20 candidates expressed interest in the Republican nomination. (Collins later changed course and opted to seek re-election.) Among them were the following:

- David Bellavia, Iraq War veteran and radio host
- Lynne Dixon, Erie County legislator
- Patrick M. Gallivan, state senator
- Stephen Hawley, state assemblyman
- Chris Jacobs, state senator and former New York Secretary of State
- Stefan I. Mychajliw Jr., Erie County Comptroller
- Robert Ortt, state senator
- Carl Paladino, 2010 gubernatorial nominee, former member of the Buffalo Public Schools Board of Education and founder of Ellicott Development Co.
- Michael Ranzenhofer, state senator
- Ed Rath, Erie County legislator
- Ray Walter, state assemblyman

==== Polling ====
Poll source	Date(s) administered	Sample size	Margin of error	Chris Collins (R)	Nate McMurray (D)	Larry Piegza (REF)	Undecided
Dixie Strategies	October 29–30, 2018	801	± 3.46%	45%	38%	–	17%
NYT Upshot/Siena College	October 24–29, 2018	501	± 4.8%	44%	40%	3%	13%
Tulchin Research (D-McMurray)	October 25–28, 2018	400	± 4.9%	43%	47%	4%	6%
Siena College	October 6–11, 2018	490	± 4.7%	46%	43%	1%	10%
Tulchin Research (D-McMurray)	October 6–8, 2018	400	± 4.9%	42%	42%	6%	10%

Hypothetical polling

With Jacobs

Poll source	Date(s) administered	Sample size	Margin of error	Chris Jacobs (R)	Nate McMurray (D)	Undecided
Clout Research (R)	August 13, 2018	338	± 5.3%	46%	35%	19%

With Mychajliw

Poll source	Date(s) administered	Sample size	Margin of error	Nate McMurray (D)	Stefan Mychajliw (R)	Undecided
Clout Research (R)	August 13, 2018	338	± 5.3%	36%	49%	15%

With Ortt

Poll source	Date(s) administered	Sample size	Margin of error	Nate McMurray (D)	Rob Ortt (R)	Undecided
Clout Research (R)	August 13, 2018	338	± 5.3%	35%	43%	22%

With Paladino

Poll source	Date(s) administered	Sample size	Margin of error	Nate McMurray (D)	Carl Paladino (R)	Undecided
Clout Research (R)	August 13, 2018	338	± 5.3%	45%	47%	9%

==== Endorsements ====
Chris Collins (R)

Local officials

- Michael R. Long, former NYC Councillor
Nate McMurray (D)

State officials

- Kathy Hochul, Lieutenant Governor of New York

Labor unions

- 1199SEIU United Healthcare Workers East
- New York State United Teachers

Newspapers

- The Buffalo News
- The New York Post

==== Results ====
New York's 27th congressional district, 2018
Party	Candidate	Votes	%
Republican	Chris Collins	114,506	40.2
Conservative	Chris Collins	23,553	8.2
Independence	Chris Collins	2,087	0.7
Total	Chris Collins (incumbent)	140,146	49.1
Democratic	Nate McMurray	128,167	45.0
Working Families	Nate McMurray	8,090	2.8
Women's Equality	Nate McMurray	2,802	1.0
Total	Nate McMurray	139,059	48.8
Reform	Larry Piegza	5,973	2.1
Total votes		285,178	100.0
Republican hold			
