= Hannah Selinger =

American author

- Citizenship: American
- Occupations: Author, Journalist
- Website: www.hannahselinger.net

Hannah Selinger is an American author and journalist, known primarily for her writing on food, wine, and the restaurant industry. She published a memoir, Cellar Rat: My Life in the Restaurant Underbelly, in 2025.

== Career ==
Hannah Selinger started her career in the restaurant industry in the early 2000s, working as a server and sommelier in New York City establishments such as Jean-Georges and Momofuku. She began her writing career in the late 2000s to early 2010s, following her transition from the restaurant industry.

Her essay “In My Childhood Kitchen, I Learned Both Fear and Love” was featured in the 2022 Best American Food Writing anthology. She was a finalist for the 2022 James Beard MFK Fisher Distinguished Writing Award.

In 2025, Selinger published her debut memoir, Cellar Rat: My Life in the Restaurant Underbelly, through Little, Brown and Company. The memoir details her experiences in the fine-dining industry.

With over 15 years in journalism, Selinger has contributed to publications such as The New York Times, The Washington Post, Travel + Leisure, Food & Wine, The Wall Street Journal, Bon Appétit, CNN, The Independent, HuffPost, and Al Jazeera, among many others.
