= VRA =

VRA may refer to:

== Government ==
- Voting Rights Act of 1965, a piece of federal legislation in the United States
- Video Recordings Act 1984, a piece of United Kingdom legislation
- Volta River Authority, the government agency in the Republic of Ghana responsible for the generation and supply of electricity
- Voluntary restraint agreement, an agreement to limit exports

== Organizations ==
- Visual Resources Association, a library association for image media professionals
- Volunteer Railroaders Association, a New Jersey–based non-profit group of volunteers
- Volunteer Rescue Association, in NSW, Australia

== Other uses ==
- VRA, IATA airport code for Juan Gualberto Gómez Airport, Varadero, Cuba
- Vrå, Hjørring, Denmark
- VRA Amsterdam, a Dutch cricket club based in Amstelveen
- VRA Cricket Ground, a cricket ground in Amstelveen, used by the Dutch national side
