= Suscon, Pennsylvania =

Unincorporated community in Pennsylvania, US

- Unincorporated community
- Location in Pennsylvania Location in the United States
- Coordinates: 41°18′8″N 75°43′21″W
- Country: United States
- State: Pennsylvania
- County: Luzerne
- Township: Pittston
- Time zone: UTC-5 (Eastern (EST))
  - Summer (DST): UTC-4 (EDT)
- ZIP code: 18640
- Area code: 570

Suscon is an unincorporated community in Pittston Township, Luzerne County, Pennsylvania, United States, northeast of Wilkes-Barre and south of Scranton. It is named for its position at the former junction of the Susquehanna Connecting Railroad and the Wilkes-Barre and Eastern Railroad (both subsidiaries of the New York, Susquehanna and Western Railway). It uses the Pittston zip code of 18640.

Suscon is notable for being the home of the urban legend "The Suscon Screamer."

== History ==
=== Tornado ===
An EF2 tornado struck Suscon (Pittston Township) on Saturday, February 25, 2017. It was on the ground from 2:30 pm to 2:50 pm. This is the first tornado in February for Luzerne County in recorded history. The tornado generated top wind speeds of 120 mph, had a maximum width of 500 yards, and traveled 12.8 miles.

== Geography ==
Suscon is located in the eastern part of Pittston Township. It is mostly made up of mountains and forests.
