= Volunteer Railroaders Association =

Non-profit interested in railroad heritage & preservation

Volunteer Railroaders Association (aka VRA) is a New Jersey–based 501(c)(3) non-profit organization of volunteers interested in railroad heritage and preservation. The VRA has conducted rail-oriented excursions in New York and Pennsylvania, in addition to New Jersey, including children oriented fund-raising train rides in New Jersey and New York. The group owns and operates and four railroad speeders. One is a rare Lehigh & New England Railroad Sheffield Corporation model 40B. The group has also organized gatherings of as many as 40 speeders in Pennsylvania.

== Mission statement ==
The VRA's mission is to raise funds for the preservation and restoration historic railroad right of way, rolling stock and other related items. We also strive to educate the public to create an awareness of our mission through our many events focused on the history and future need for railroad operations. To restore, maintain and operate historic railroad speeders (motorcars) the Hawthorne NJ railroad station and to demonstrate speeders place in railroad history.

== History ==
In the beginning the group was known as the Susquehanna Volunteer Association (SVA) and was incorporated on 4 October 1993. The SVA volunteers worked on the New York, Susquehanna and Western Railway (NYS&W) steam excursions beginning that year. Between 1996–1998, the Volunteer Railroaders Association and New Jersey Transit co-sponsored steam excursions using Chesapeake & Ohio 614, a class "J-3-A" 4-8-4 "Greenbrier" (Northern) type steam locomotive. The volunteer-run excursions traveled 180 miles (290 km) round-trip between Hoboken, New Jersey, and Port Jervis, New York. In 1997, the group changed its name to Volunteer Railroaders Association and adopted the slogan "So close, only the paycheck is missing."

== Current programs ==
Regional gatherings are also organized, such as a gathering of 40 speeders between Honesdale, Pennsylvania, and Lackawaxen on May 17, 2003, for example. Other past excursions have included the Delaware and Ulster Railroad in New York and the Delaware, Lackawaxen, & Stourbridge Railroad (DL&S) in Pennsylvania.

The VRA meets quarterly in Hawthorne, New Jersey, and leases the Hawthorne station from the New York, Susquehanna and Western Railway. On May 22, 2011, the organization celebrated the completion of its almost year-long restoration project for the station, which had received the blessing of city officials. In January 2019, the VRA was one of three organizations recognized as "Member of the Year" by the Hawthorne Chamber of Commerce.

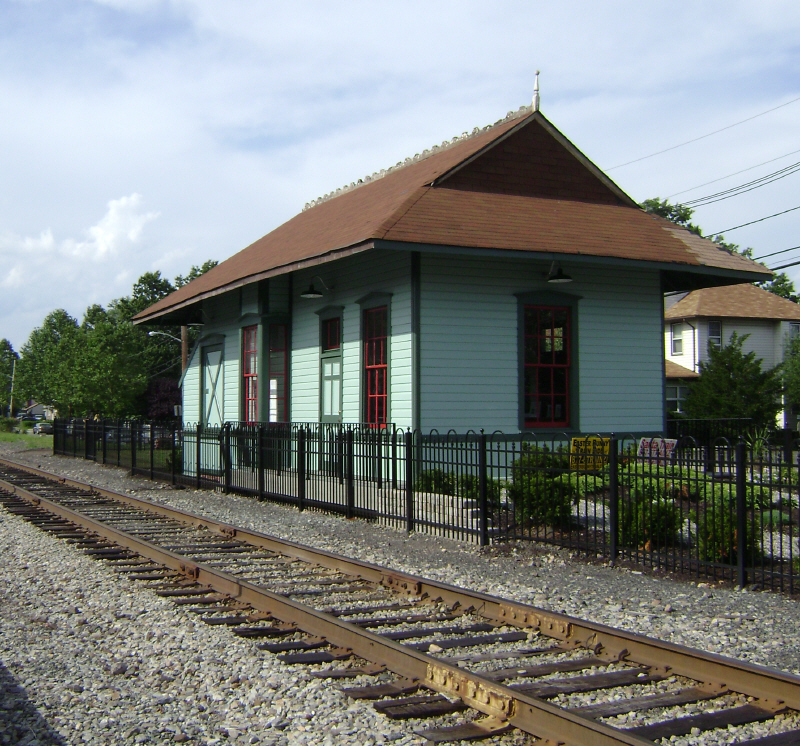
Hawthorne NYS&W station

Since its founding, the VRA has run many trips carrying thousands of people. The children's events are fundraisers to benefit the creation of the NJ State Transportation Museum, the Friends of the NJ Railroad & Transportation Museum and other railroad related preservation activities. Trips such as Santa Train Rides and Easter Bunny Train Rides on NJ Transit using modern coaches. The VRA no longer runs any Santa or Easter trips on New Jersey Transit due to prohibitive costs.

The current project that has been ongoing for a few years is running 45-minute speeder trips from Cape May, New Jersey, to the Cape May Intracoastal Waterway Canal on the Cape May Seashore Railroad in southern New Jersey.

== East Coast Railroaders Group ==
In 2020 a committee of the Volunteer Railroaders Association was formalized to provide track car services to small railroads throughout the eastern seaboard. All through its history the VRA had been providing brush cutting service to various shortlines. This sub-group has a motto "FIRST IN SAFETY, FIRST IN SERVICE" and is composed entirely of professional railroaders. A restoration project to assist in clearing the right-of-way of the Cape May Seashore Railroad for resumption of excursions between from Rio Grande, New Jersey, to Cold Spring began in 2020.
