= North Hawthorne station =

Former railway station in Hawthorne, New Jersey, US

North Hawthorne
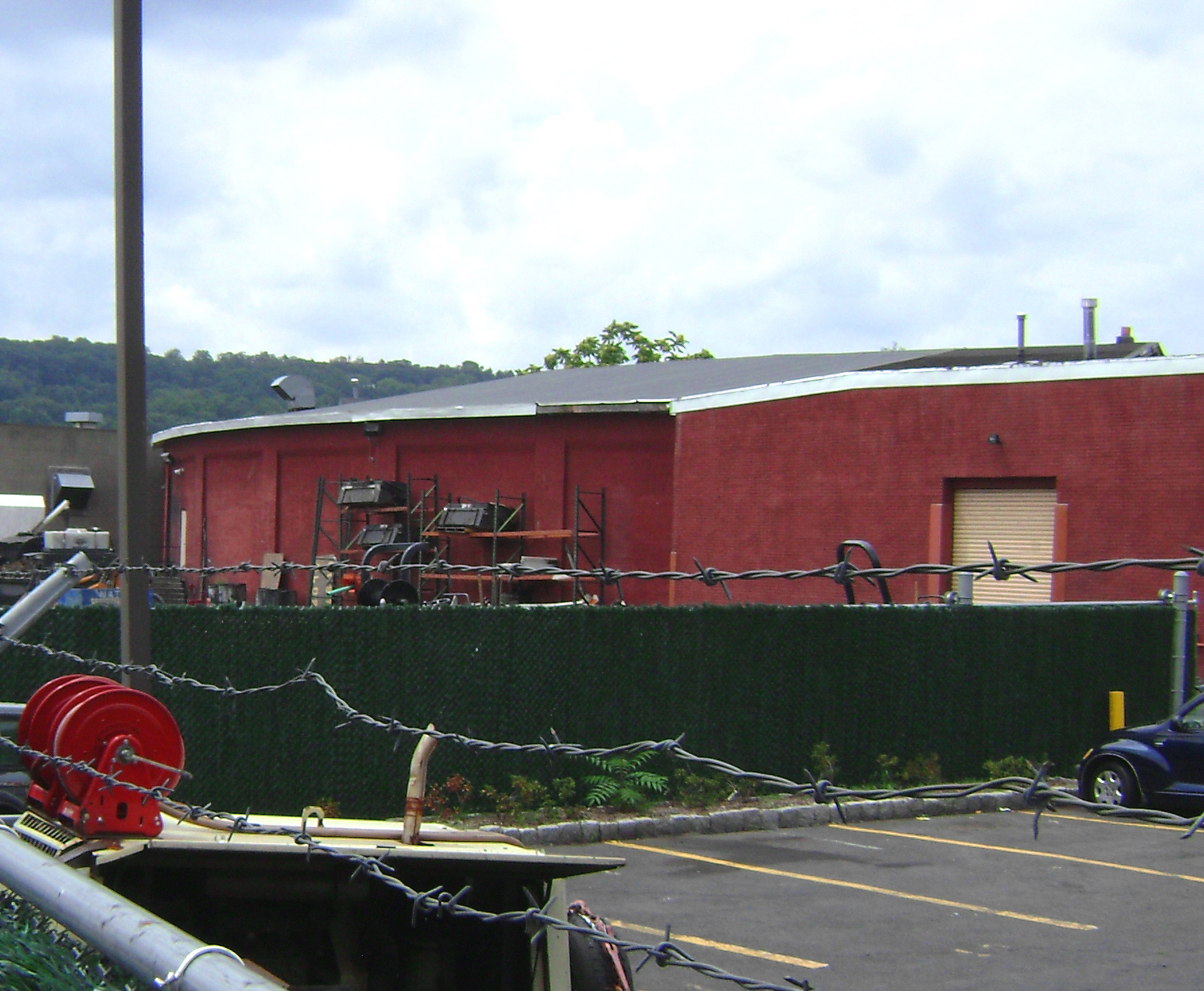
- Former roundhouse building seen from behind a fence in 2012.

General information
- Location: Rea Avenue, Hawthorne, New Jersey, 07506
- Coordinates: 40.95844°N 74.15436°W
- Owner: NYS&W (1892–1898); Erie Railroad (1898–1937); NYS&W (1937–1966)
- Line: New York, Susquehanna and Western Railroad Main Line
- Platforms: 1 low-level side platform
- Tracks: 2 New York, Susquehanna and Western Railroad
- Connections: Public Service Railway trolley Hawthorne/State/Lakeview Line (1911–1926) Public Service Coordinated Transport bus route P22 (1926–1966)

Construction
- Structure type: at-grade

Other information
- Station code: 1127 (Erie Railroad); NP (NYS&W)

History
- Opened: 1872
- Closed: June 30, 1966
- Rebuilt: 1892
- Electrified: Not electrified
- Former names: North Paterson

Key dates
- February 13, 1977: Station depot burned

Services
Preceding station	New York, Susquehanna and Western Railroad	Following station
Midland Park toward Stroudsburg	Main Line	Hawthorne toward Susquehanna Transfer or Jersey City
Location

North Hawthorne, known as North Paterson when originally constructed, was a rail station and yard located in Hawthorne, Passaic County, New Jersey. The facility, which was equipped with car and engine shops, served passengers and freight for both the Erie Railroad and the New York, Susquehanna and Western Railroad from 1892 to 1966. Passenger service from North Hawthorne primarily transported commuters to and from the Susquehanna Transfer station in North Bergen or the Erie Railroad's Pavonia Terminal in Jersey City. Connecting service included the now defunct Public Service Railway, which at one time used North Hawthorne as the terminus of a trolley line connecting Hawthorne to Paterson. Once a sizable complex with multiple spurs and sidings for surrounding industries, North Hawthorne has been reduced to a single runaround siding. Every structure associated with the yard has been demolished, except for the roundhouse, which today is owned by private interests.

== Station layout and services ==
=== Passenger service and site description ===
North Hawthorne was located on the NYS&W's Main Line, which during the years of Erie Railroad control (1898–1937) stretched from Croxton in Jersey City, New Jersey, to Stroudsburg, Pennsylvania. At Croxton, the NYS&W's tracks met the Erie Railroad's Main Line. Through this junction, passenger trains on the NYS&W's Main Line originating as far away as Pennsylvania were able to connect to Erie's Pavonia Terminal.

The area where the yard was located is within an industrial area of Hawthorne, between Utter Avenue and Central Avenue. The NYS&W listed its milepost (MP) along the Main Line at 23.30. It was between NYS&W's Hawthorne and Wortendyke stations, although it was much closer to Hawthorne (MP 22.5) than to Wortendyke (MP 26.10). Midland Park station once existed between North Hawthorne and Wortendyke, but no trace of it survives.

In 1941, the NYS&W's Main Line had shrunk as the railroad abandoned the line between Hainesburg Junction (Blairstown, New Jersey) and Stroudsburg, Pennsylvania. Though the railroad extended to Blairstown until 1962, passenger service by 1939 continued only between Butler and Jersey City, with trains originating in Butler and North Hawthorne.

Trains originating at North Hawthorne offered one of two options, a rapid transit ‘streamliner’ servicing locales west of Maywood, primarily Paterson with direct service to Susquehanna Transfer in North Bergen, or a local service (ten trains per week) which made frequent stops between North Hawthorne and the Susquehanna Transfer before continuing on to Jersey City's Pavonia Terminal.

In 1958, the NYS&W cut its rapid transit service, leaving only its slower local trains to operate from North Hawthorne. By 1959, Pavonia Terminal ceased to operate, ending passenger service south of the Susquehanna Transfer. Local trains to the Susquehanna Transfer from North Hawthorne eventually ended in 1966.

As of mid–2012, all that remains of North Hawthorne is one siding running parallel to where the car shop used to be. The NYS&W refers to this siding as one its runarounds. The yard's roundhouse, which was sold in 1946, still stands, although it has undergone extensive modifications. Some of the surrounding industrial buildings also retain old rail freight platforms, although these are either sealed up or in a state of disrepair.

=== Connections ===
Starting in 1911, North Hawthorne served as the northern terminus of Public Service Railway's Lakeview trolley line, with service between Hawthorne and Paterson. The trolley tracks closely paralleled to the NYS&W's Main Line in Hawthorne, following the alignment of (from south to north) Lincoln Street, Grand Avenue, and 4th Avenue. In 1912, the name Lakeview was dropped and changed to State Line. This was changed again in 1913 to simply Hawthorne. North Hawthorne continued to act as the northern terminus of line until 1914, when trolley service was extended along a mostly private right-of-way to Ridgewood.

North Hawthorne remained a transfer point to the Hawthorne trolley line until 1926, when the line was abandoned. After 1926, the trolley service was bustituted, with Public Service Coordinated Transport retaining the name Hawthorne on the bus line, which it numbered route P22. Bus service ran along Lafayette Avenue instead of 4th Avenue, one block west of the original alignment of the trolley route. Later in the 20th century, after the closing of North Hawthorne, the P22 route would evolve into New Jersey Transit's bus route 722.

== History ==
=== Early years and Erie control ===
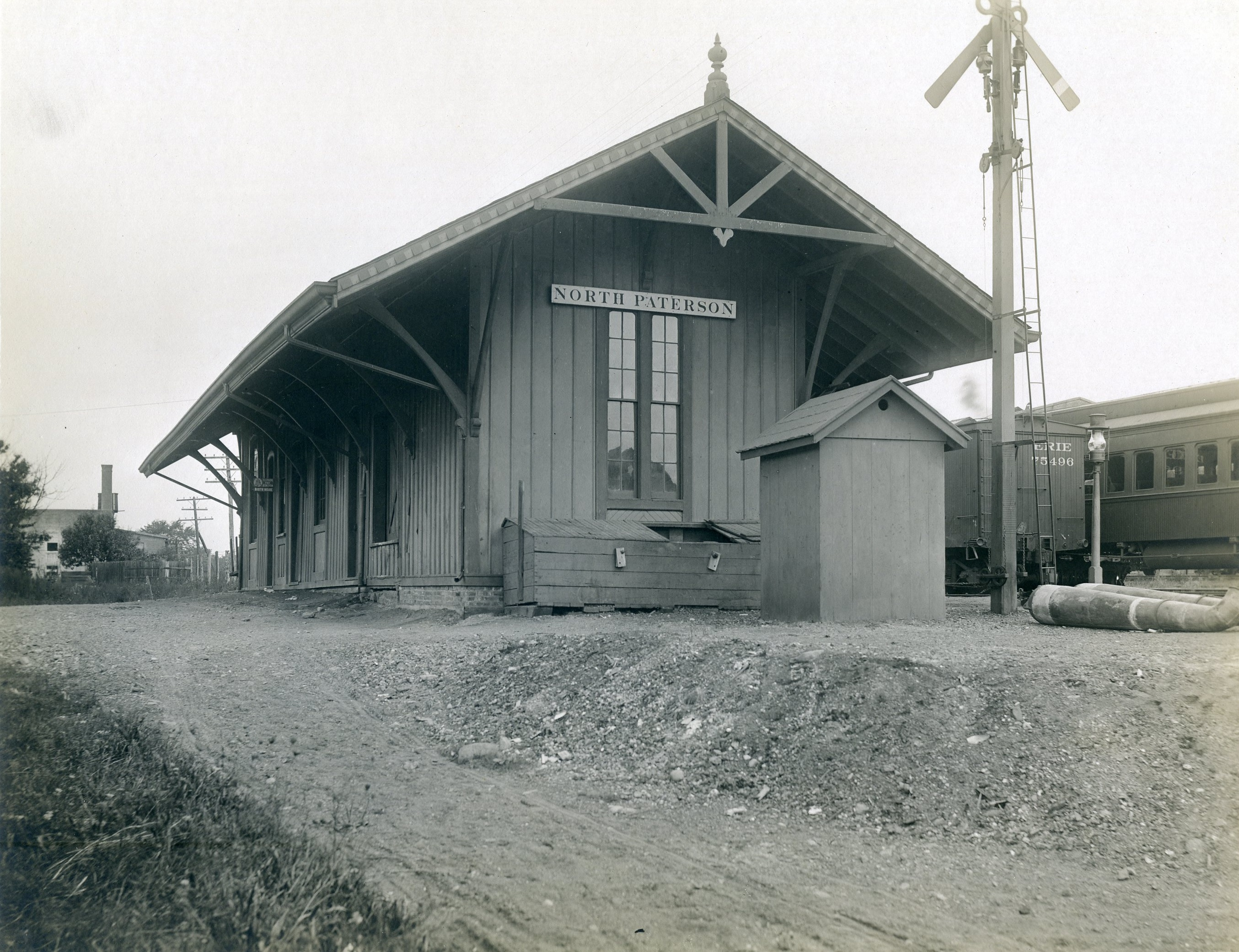
The North Hawthorne station during its time as North Paterson station

The creation of the North Hawthorne yard stemmed from a fire which destroyed repair shops, as well as some locomotives, at NYS&W's Wortendyke facility in 1891. In 1892, a new, replacement yard with car and engine shops was opened a few miles to the south of Wortendyke. The new yard at North Paterson (the Borough of Hawthorne was not established for another eight years, and the yard would not be renamed North Hawthorne until 1923) featured a roundhouse, turntable, and a passenger station with a single platform. These improvements phased out the need for passenger trains servicing the city of Paterson to reverse.

While most of North Hawthorne was essentially built from the ground up, the station house was actually relocated to the site from a nearby property. Prior to 1891, the station house sat approximately a quarter mile to the north of the North Hawthorne yard, near present-day Van Winkle Avenue. The station had been established as a depot called Van Winkle, which was named for the local family that had granted land to the NYS&W's predecessor (the New Jersey Western Railroad) for the construction of the line. Against the Van Winkle family's wishes, on May 24, 1891, the NYS&W removed the station house from its foundation and placed it on the track. A locomotive then dragged the building down the rails (which had been greased) to the North Hawthorne site, on the corner of Rea Avenue and 4th Avenue.

From 1898 to 1937, while the NYS&W was under the control of the Erie Railroad, the Main Line, on which North Hawthorne was situated, served to connect commuters and travelers as far away as Stroudsburg to Erie's Pavonia Terminal in Jersey City. At the terminal, passengers could then take ferries or Hudson & Manhattan Railroad trains (PATH train predecessor) into lower Manhattan. The volume of traffic on the Main Line was considerable, with thirty-eight passenger trains noted as make daily trips through North Hawthorne in 1915. The car shops during this time employed two hundred workers. Freight operations at North Hawthorne included a regular milk stop, with dairy product being transferred from farms north and west.

=== Reorganization and streamliner era ===
In 1937, after declaring bankruptcy, the NYS&W reorganized as an independent company under the leadership of a court-appointed trustee, Walter Kidde. Under Kidde's guidance, the railroad developed a plan to capture the market on travel to Midtown Manhattan. At the time, buses had an almost exclusive connection to Midtown due to the then newly completed Lincoln Tunnel. The NYS&W sought to compete directly with buses by offering a new passenger service to just outside the tunnel, and then using a contracted bus service to ferry passengers into Midtown.

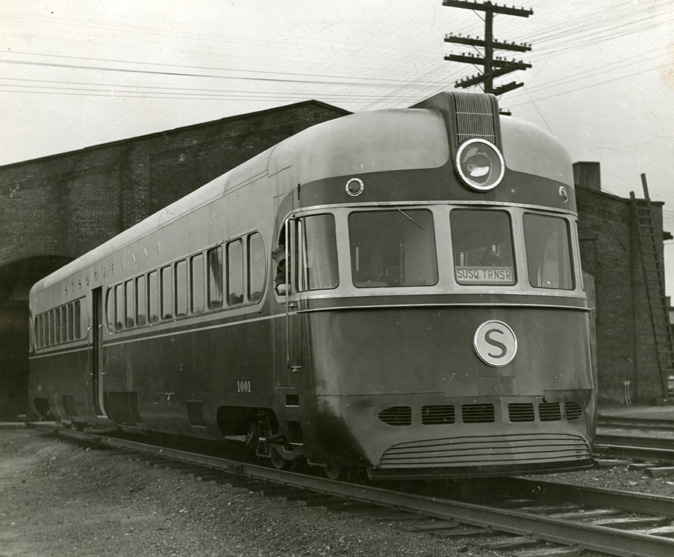
New York, Susquehanna and Western Railway streamlined locomotive, Susquehanna Transfer, ca. 1940

As initially conceived, the newly planned route to Midtown would have had bus service beginning in Butler and continuing to North Hawthorne, where passengers would then switch to rail. (Bus service was considered between Butler and North Hawthorne due to low train ridership.) Rail service would continue to the Susquehanna Transfer Station at Route 3/495, where passengers would then switch to buses to complete the commute into Midtown. However, in November 1938, the Borough of Pompton Lakes (between Butler and North Hawthorne) would not grant the railroad permission to operate a bus service within its borders. Other towns considered similar action, but the plan to use buses instead of trains between North Hawthorne and Butler was dropped by 1939 due an increase in railroad ridership.

On August 1, 1939, trains starting from Butler and North Hawthorne began making runs to the Susquehanna Transfer Station, marking the beginning of a service that would persist for the next two decades. North Hawthorne became the origin for trains making local stops between Paterson and Jersey City, as well as rapid transit ‘streamliner’ trains making stops only between Paterson and Maywood, and then proceeding directly to the Susquehanna Transfer and Jersey City.

Though it still retained some older trains, the NYS&W began purchasing a small fleet of ACF Motorailers, a type of self-propelled rail car, to run the rapid transit route between North Hawthorne and Susquehanna Transfer. These were supplemented by leased Electro Motive Company motor cars from the Erie Railroad, which the NYS&W utilized until 1944. The railroad also purchased two used Brill motor cars and rebuilt them to look more like its ACF cars. All of these cars, including the leased Erie cars, were repaired at the North Hawthorne car shop until 1946. After 1946, repairs were shifted to NYS&W's Little Ferry facility. However, as North Hawthorne remained a starting point of local and rapid transit service, cars were continually stored there. North Hawthorne's roundhouse was subsequently sold the same year, and the old car shop became not much more than a garage. Though both Brill and ACF cars were stored at North Hawthorne overnight, the NYS&W favored using the ACF cars over the Brills whenever possible, so it was not uncommon for the Brills to be held on standby in North Hawthorne.

In October, 1950, the NYS&W put new Budd RDC cars into service on the North Hawthorne-Susquehana Transfer route. Like their predecessors the Brills and the ACFs, the new RDCs were stored overnight in North Hawthorne at the car shop-turned-garage. This continued until 1958, when an economic downturn and rising operating costs forced the NYS&W to begin mothballing and selling off its fleet of RDCs. The rapid transit service was cancelled, but North Hawthorne continued to operate as a passenger terminal, as well as a storage facility for non-motorized rail cars. Finally, on June 30, 1966, the last passenger trains left North Hawthorne, and the yard began to fall into disrepair.

=== Post-passenger service and industrial decline ===
Near noon on Friday, February 17, 1967, the Morningstar-Paisley plant just north of the station house exploded, spreading debris and scorching heat through the disused yard. Just before the incident, an NYS&W crew had placed a fully loaded boxcar along the plant's siding. As the crew moved its locomotive in front of the station house, the plant was leveled by a blast delivering enough power to throw the loaded boxcar across two sets of tracks. The resulting fire engulfed a structure attached to the plant and an outlying building on the property, but firefighters managed to keep it from spreading further.

By the arrival of the 1970s, financial difficulties forced the NYS&W to dismantle the yard. The station house initially escaped demolition, but a suspected arson on February 13, 1977 destroyed the building. What remained of North Hawthorne by the late 1970s were a few sidings along where the station house and car shop were situated, as well as the spurs and sidings for surrounding industrial properties. By 2003, the largest spur, for an industrial complex (including a large, former A&P warehouse) located just east of where the car shop used to be, was no longer in service, and what remained of the tracks was scheduled to be removed. By 2008, the last industry using a siding linked to the former North Hawthorne yard (Delawanna Plastics) was gone, and the siding, which crossed Utter Avenue, was scheduled to be removed. In 2009, the remnants of the corridor used by the largest spur were provided as an easement to local industry to expand a driveway.

== Bibliography ==
- Catlin, George L. (1872). Homes on the Midland for New York Business Men. New York, New York: J. W. Pratt.
- Carlough, Curtis V.; Fredericks, Harold; Stuy, Timothy; Van Dyk, Fred (1999). The Next Station Will Be... Volume 1 (Revised). New Jersey Midland Railroad Historical Society, Inc. ISBN 9780941652155.
