= Hawthorne station (New York, Susquehanna and Western Railroad) =

Former rail station in Hawthorne, New Jersey, US

Hawthorne
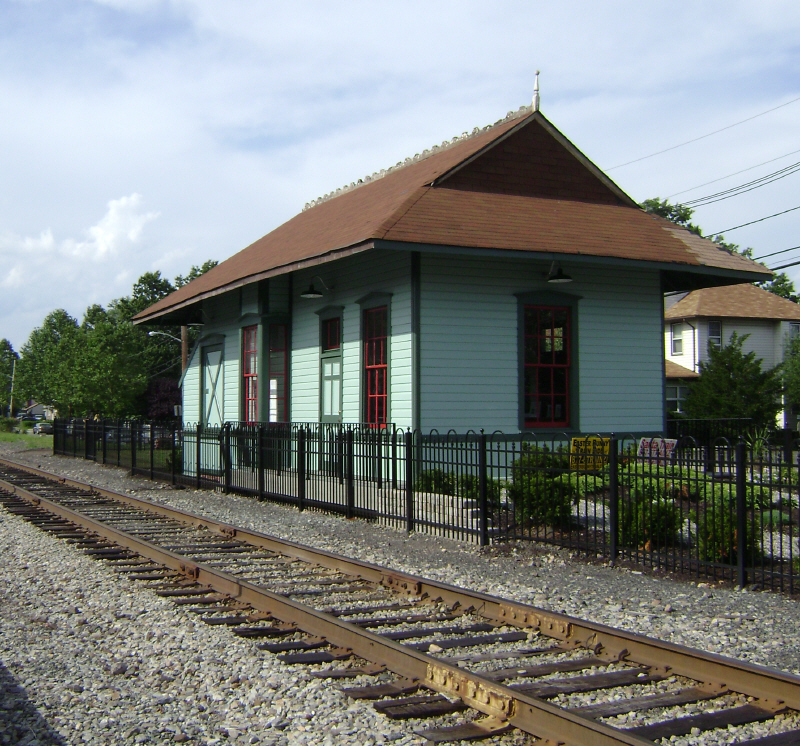
- Hawthorne station viewed from Grand Avenue

General information
- Location: 80 Royal Avenue; Hawthorne, New Jersey; United States
- Coordinates: 40.94916°N 74.15391°W
- System: Passenger/Freight
- Owner: New York, Susquehanna and Western Railway
- Operator: Volunteer Railroaders Association
- Line: NYS&W southern division main line
- Platforms: 1 (side, inactive)
- Tracks: 1

Construction
- Structure type: At-grade
- Parking: On-street
- Accessible: Yes
- Architectural style: Carpenter Gothic

Other information
- Status: Retired
- Station code: 1123 (Erie Railroad), HW telegraph call

History
- Opened: 1872
- Closed: June 30, 1966
- Rebuilt: 1894
- Original company: New Jersey Western Railway

Services
Preceding station	New York, Susquehanna and Western Railroad	Following station
North Hawthorne toward Stroudsburg	Main Line	Riverside toward Susquehanna Transfer or Jersey City
Location

Hawthorne is a former New York, Susquehanna and Western Railway station located in Hawthorne in Passaic County, New Jersey. The station served as the Susquehanna's passenger ticket office until the end of passenger service on June 30, 1966, and was also used as a freight depot. While the Susquehanna retains ownership, the Volunteer Railroaders Association (VRA), a non-profit railroad preservation group, leases the station for their activities.

== Architecture ==
The station house is a rectangular at-grade single-story wooden structure in the Carpenter Gothic style featuring a Dutch gable roof with gingerbread trim at the ridgeline. The sides are clad in shiplap reaching down to wainscoting (both separated with molding), further down to a brick-faced foundation. There are two large double-hung windows streetside flanking an entry door, one such window on the short east end of the building, and one trackside, beside another entry door. There is also a bay window trackside for the ticket office featuring three double-hung elements itself. The two doors provide access trackside and streetside, and both feature transom windows. There are also mock freight doors on each side of the western end of the building, a vestige of former actual freight depot use. All windows and doors feature small pediments.

== History ==
The location is exceptional in the history of the Susquehanna railroad as its predecessor, the New Jersey Western Railroad, began building from a nearby junction with the Erie Railroad. The NJW built west to Bloomingdale, and east to Paterson beginning in 1869 with DeWitt Clinton Littlejohn envisioning the New Jersey railroad as the final eastern link to New York City in his New York and Oswego Midland Railroad. In 1870, the New Jersey Western was consolidated into the New Jersey Midland Railway. That railroad would stretch to Newfoundland and Hackensack by March 1872, and eventually to Middletown to link with the NYOM in the west, and east to Jersey City to link with the Pennsylvania Railroad at Marion. The first trains from Oswego to Jersey City began to run along the combined Midland route in 1873. By 1881 the railroad had become the New York, Susquehanna and Western Railroad and turned toward hauling coal from the Wyoming Valley of Pennsylvania.

The station was completed in 1894 to replace the original station railroad-east, nearer the junction with the Erie Railroad. From then until 2010 the station stood on the corner of Royal Avenue and County Route 654 (Diamond Bridge Avenue).

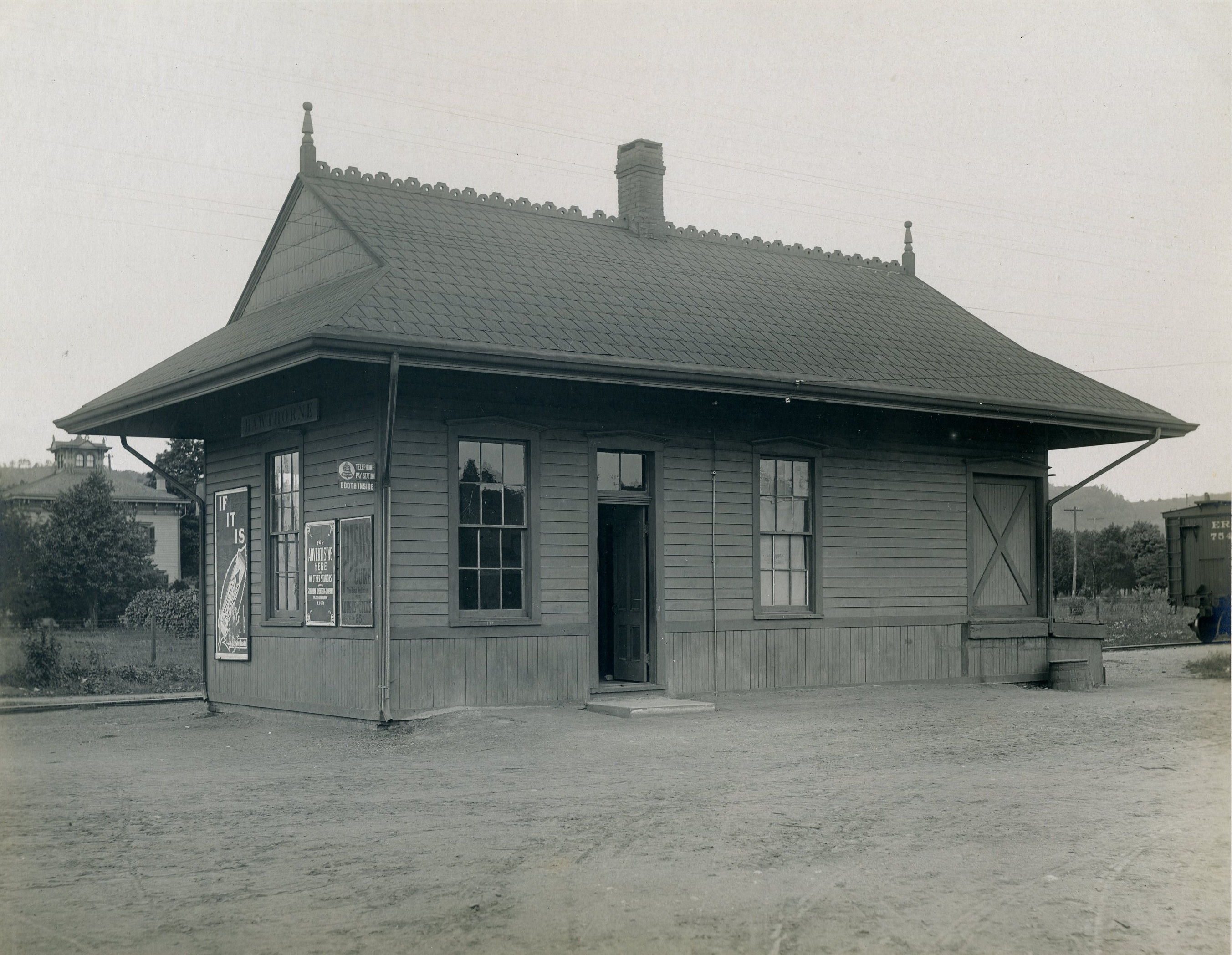
The station c. 1907–1912

As early as 2005 the VRA began planning a physical move of the station to alleviate the nearly monthly truck strikes to the southeast roof corner. The group fundraised and by July 2010 was constructing a new concrete block foundation with a poured concrete floor, seventy-five feet west of the building's then-current location.

On September 17, 2010, the station's move onto the new foundation was completed by a contractor. Restoration then began, including replacement of deteriorated wooden siding and a full repaint. Also added were a deck with safety railing, a fence between the station and the railroad right-of-way, and a garden patio area in the location of the old station footprint. The damaged roof was also repaired.

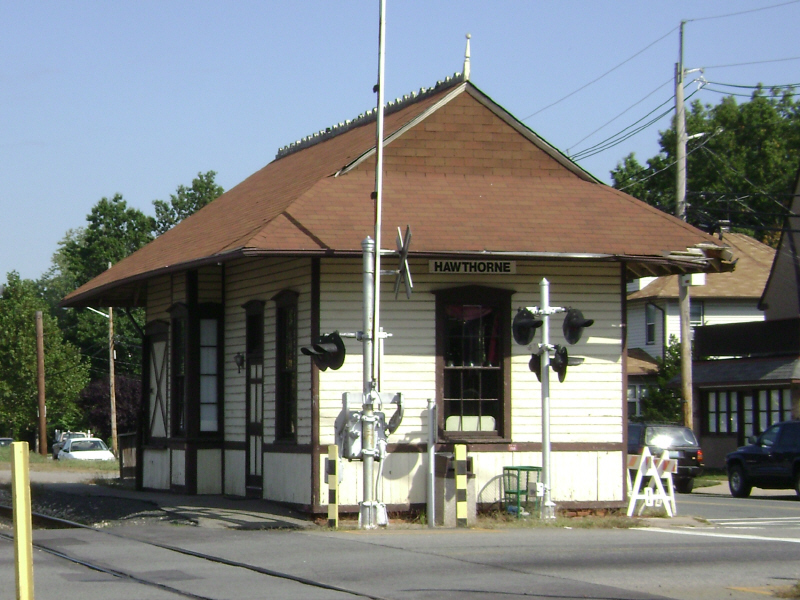
Hawthorne station prior to restoration. Note the roof damage visible at right.

In the 2010s it was proposed that New Jersey Transit build a new station for the northern terminus of the Passaic-Bergen Rail Line adjacent to the NJ Transit Main Line's Hawthorne station several blocks away from this station. The neighborhood of the original Erie mainline station would benefit from state funding to improve signage, lighting and parking. These efforts did not come to fruition.

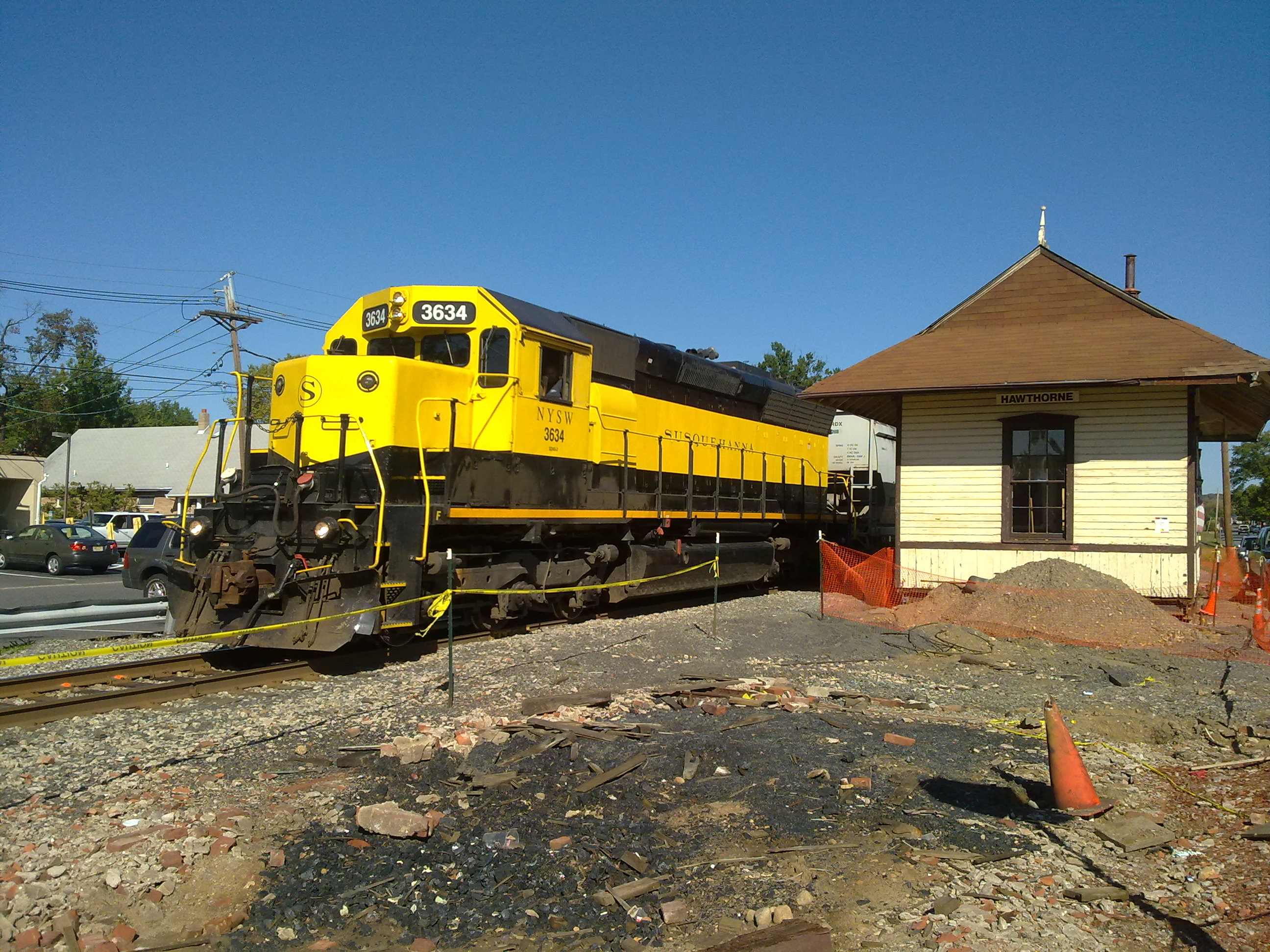
NYSW SD45-2 3634 at Hawthorne just after the station was moved in 2010. Note the roof damage visible at right.

== See also ==
- NYSW (passenger 1939–1966) map
- Passaic-Bergen-Hudson Transit map
- Operating Passenger Railroad Stations Thematic Resource (New Jersey)

== Bibliography ==
- Catlin, George L. (1872). Homes on the Midland for New York Business Men. New York, New York: J. W. Pratt.
- Lucas, Walter Arndt (1980) [1939]. The History of the New York, Susquehanna and Western Railroad (second ed.). Railroadians of America. LCCN 82163920.
- Schmitt, James C. (2009). Historic Rails of the New York, Susquehanna & Western Railroad. West Milford, New Jersey: Tinfoil Rose Design, LLC. ISBN 9780615313849.
- Krause, John; Crist, Ed (1991). Susquehanna: New York, Susquehanna & Western RR. Newton, New Jersey: Carstens Publications. ISBN 9780911868807.
- Mohowski, Robert E. (2003). The New York, Susquehanna & Western Railroad. Baltimore: Johns Hopkins University Press. ISBN 9780801872228.
- Carlough, Curtis V.; Fredericks, Harold; Stuy, Timothy; Van Dyk, Fred (1999). The Next Station Will Be... Volume 1 (Revised). New Jersey Midland Railroad Historical Society, Inc. ISBN 9780941652155.
