= Gravel Place, Pennsylvania =

Former rail yard in Pennsylvania, U.S.

Gravel Place
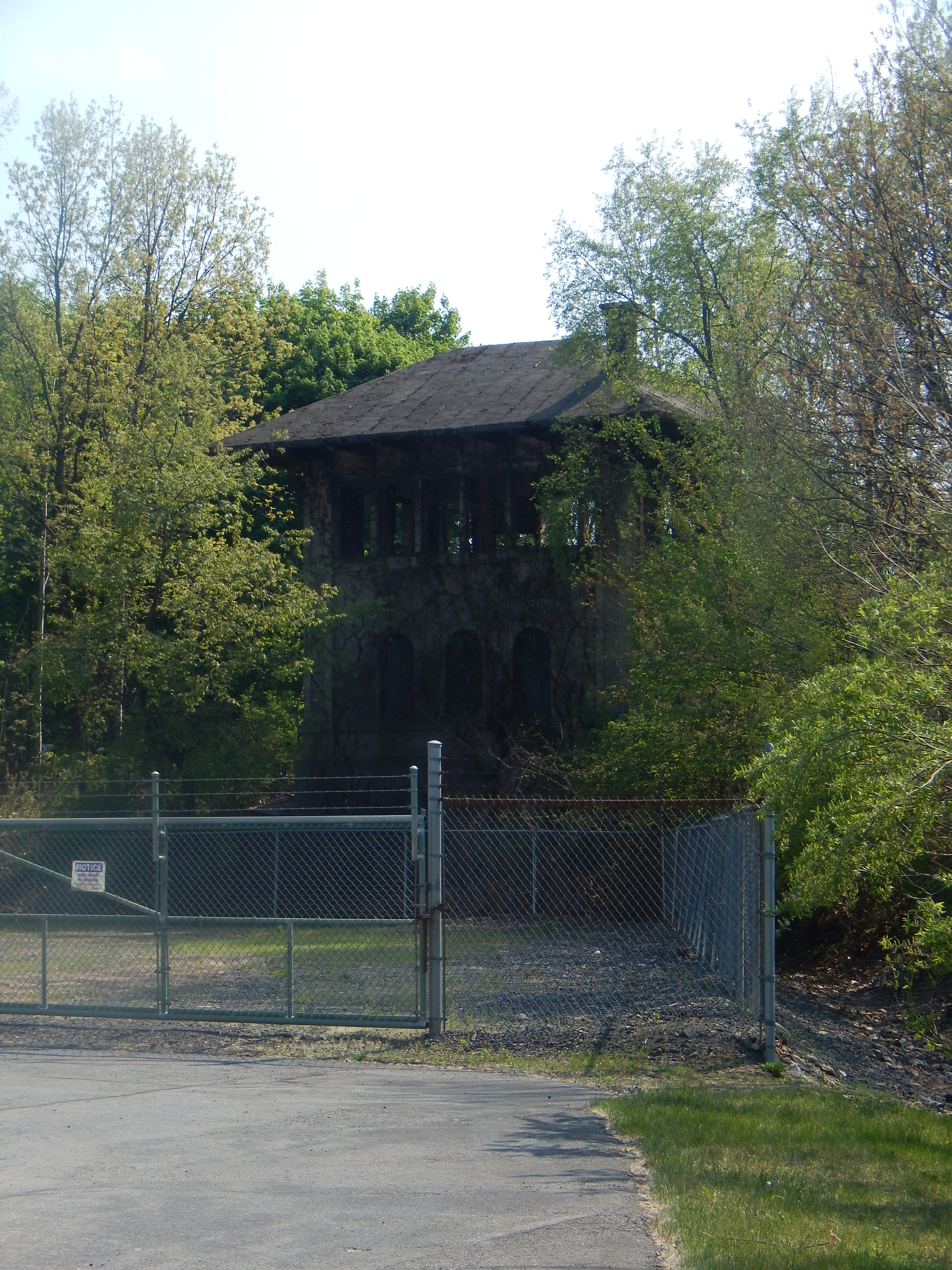
- Gravel Place switching tower, 2015

Location
- Location: Arlington Heights, Pennsylvania, U.S.
- Coordinates: 41°01′06″N 75°11′44″W

Characteristics
- Type: Locomotive

History
- Opened: 1882
- Closed: c. 1950
- Original: Delaware, Lackawanna and Western Railroad

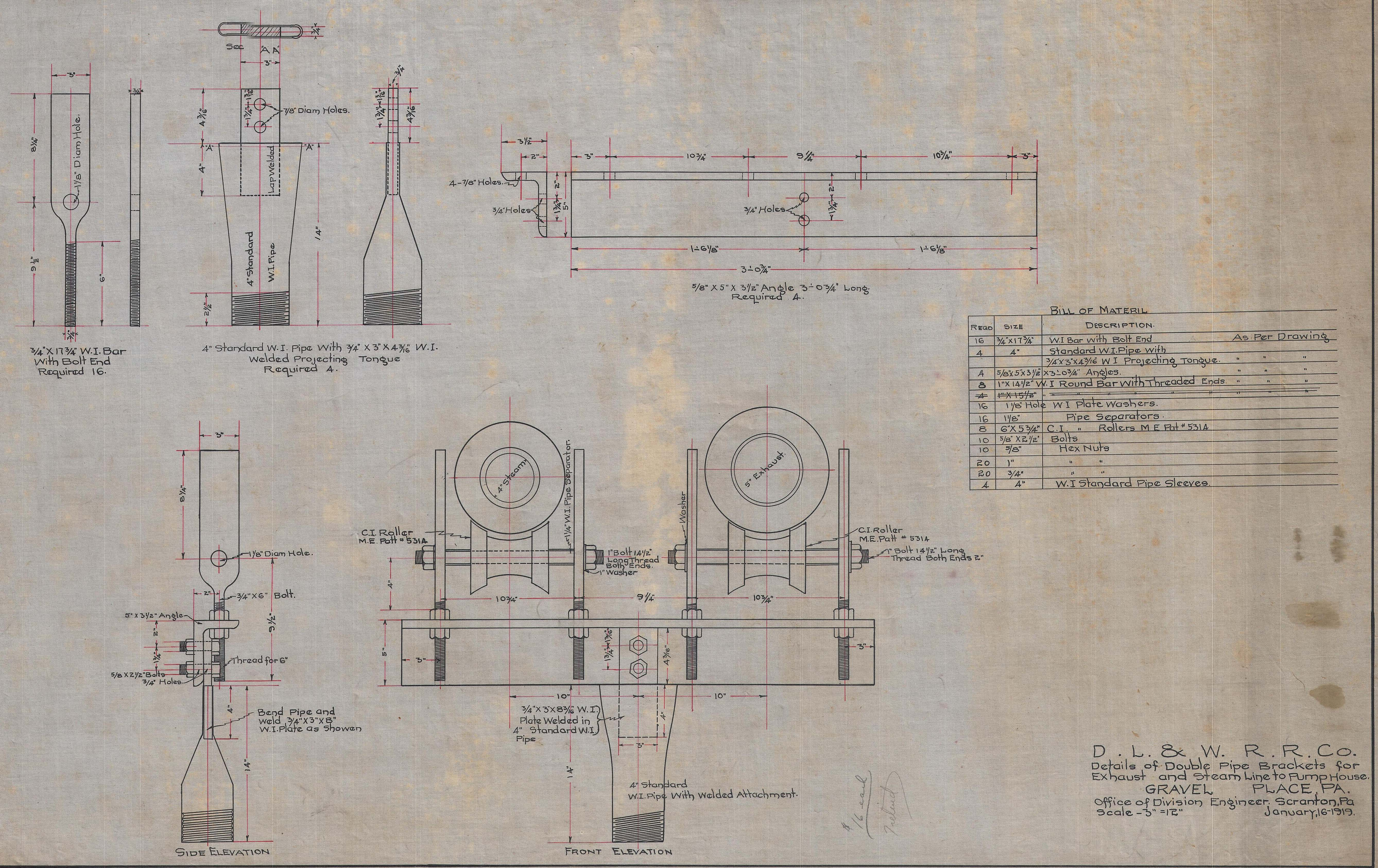
DL&W drawing from 1919 of equipment used at Gravel Place pumphouse

Gravel Place is a location within Arlington Heights, Pennsylvania, about three miles (4.8 km) northeast of East Stroudsburg. It is neither incorporated nor a census-designated place, but has a name recognized by the USGS. From the 1880s to about 1950, it was a railroad yard of the Delaware, Lackawanna and Western Railroad (DL&W) on its mainline from Hoboken Terminal in New Jersey, which served New York City by ferry, to Scranton, Pennsylvania, continuing northwest into New York State with its western terminus in Buffalo, New York. It is just north of present Mill Creek Road.

== NYS&W interchange ==
The New York, Susquehanna and Western Railway (NYS&W) was formed in June, 1881 through the merger of several small railroads. It had an agreement with the DL&W which called for the DL&W to haul coal from mines in northeastern Pennsylvania, primarily from Pennsylvania Anthracite Coal Company and Lackawanna Coal Company mines near Scranton, to an interchange with the NYS&W at Gravel Place. The NYS&W would take it farther east to an interchange with the Pennsylvania Railroad in New Jersey, from which it would travel to the port of Edgewater, New Jersey for shipment to customers. By 1882, the NYS&W had laid track from Weehawken, New Jersey to Gravel Place, where it established a connection with the DL&W. To complete the last few miles and reach Gravel Place, a bridge was constructed across the Delaware River in the Delaware Gap. The coal-hauling operation began the day after the line was finished.

After a decade, the NYS&W decided to end the agreement with the DL&W. In 1892, the NYS&W formed a subsidiary, the Wilkes-Barre and Eastern Railroad (WB&E), to reach the mines directly. The new WB&E line from Stroudsburg to Wilkes-Barre was completed in 1894, and the NYS&W removed the short segment of track between Stroudsburg and Gravel Place.

== DL&W Yard ==
After the NYS&W interchange was removed, Gravel Place became a DL&W yard. The railroad built a water tower at Gravel Place c. 1900. It also operated a fueling and minor repair yard there. While the main DL&W locomotive repair center was at Scranton, Gravel Place could handle locomotive inspections and minor repairs. The facility had a turntable, seven-stall roundhouse and a locomotive service pit. Freight cars with mechanical problems were left at Gravel Place for repair. Common wheel problems could be handled on a cripple track alongside the main track. The roundhouse was used to store pusher locomotives kept at Gravel Place.

Westbound DL&W freight trains stopped at Gravel Place to take on coal and water, and discharge ash, before continuing over the Poconos on to Scranton. Pusher locomotives were added to the rear to help with the climb to Pocono Summit, where they would uncouple and return light to Gravel Place. Helper engines were necessary to get heavy trains through the Pocono Mountains.

There were also livestock pens to rest animals that had been traveling for long periods. The yard grew to reach one mile (1.6 km) long and 400 feet (120 m) wide. Until 1929, up to 15,000 cars of coal were stockpiled on the west side of the tracks to provide a backup coal supply to DL&W steam locomotives in case of a miners' strike. Gravel Place closed in the late 1940s, at the end of the steam era on the DL&W, as new diesels made its facilities obsolete.

Gravel Place also had a mechanical switch tower to control the switching of tracks. The concrete tower was built in 1910 and had 32 levers for the mechanical interlocking systems for the cripple track, the roundhouse and connecting tracks, and was staffed full-time.

In 1942, some mechanical switching in the area was upgraded to electronic centralized traffic control (CTC). Mechanical switches were operated by electric motors, and the control and signalling was done by wire. This allowed consolidation and labor savings. The function of the switching towers at West Henryville and Analomink was then controlled remotely from the Gravel Place tower. In 1950, the switches at Gravel Place were also electrified, allowing them to be controlled remotely. The CTC machine was moved to the tower at East Stroudsburg, where it controlled the switches at West Henryville, Analomink, and Gravel Place, leaving the Gravel Place tower unmanned as well. The out-of-service tower is still standing and is listed in the Pennsylvania Historical and Museum Commission Cultural Resources Database.

The DL&W roundhouse was the first large customer of the area's water provider, The Stroudsburg Water Company which was organized in 1867.
