= Wilkes-Barre and Eastern Railroad =

American railroad operating 1892–1939

Wilkes-Barre & Eastern Railroad

Overview
- Headquarters: New Jersey
- Reporting mark: WB&E
- Locale: Pennsylvania
- Dates of operation: 1892–1939

Technical
- Track gauge: 4 ft 8 1/2 in (1,435 mm) standard gauge

The Wilkes-Barre and Eastern Railroad (WB&E) was a railroad that operated in the Commonwealth of Pennsylvania in the United States from 1892 to 1939.

== History ==
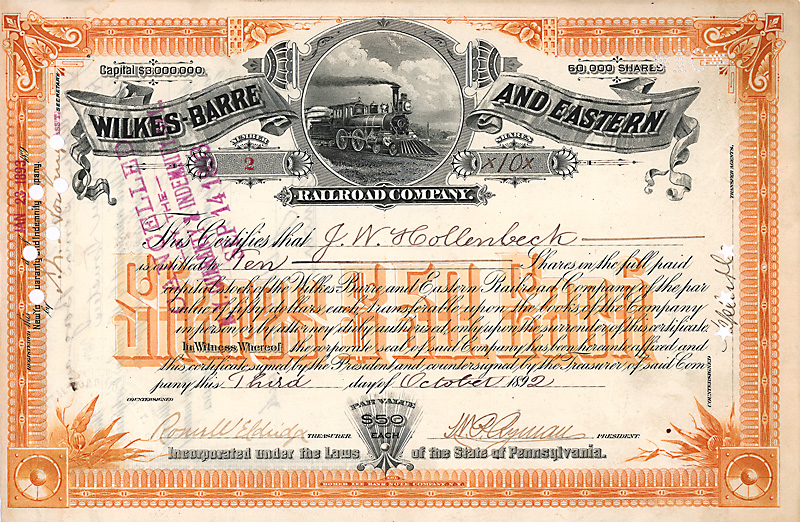
Share of the Wilkes-Barre & Eastern Railroad Company from the 14. February 1893

The WB&E was a wholly owned subsidiary of the New York, Susquehanna and Western Railroad (NYS&W). It was chartered in 1892 to provide the NYS&W with a route to bring coal from the mines in northeastern Pennsylvania for delivery to the port of Edgewater, New Jersey.

Previously, the NYS&W was contracting the coal haulage in Pennsylvania to the Delaware, Lackawanna and Western Railroad (DL&W). The DL&W originally hauled coal to their interchange with the NYS&W at Gravel Place, Pennsylvania. From there, the NYS&W would haul the coal to an interchange with the Pennsylvania Railroad in New Jersey.

With the WB&E and exclusive control of distribution facilities at the port in Edgewater, the NYS&W had a direct way to move the coal from the mine to various markets without having to rely on (and pay) two additional railroads for haulage.

Wilkes-Barre and Eastern Map, with connecting and competing railroads

Approximately 15 miles east of Wilkes-Barre, the WB&E crossed the Panther Creek ravine over a spectacular 1,650-foot viaduct which stood 161 feet above the creek bed. It consisted of 20 iron towers and 42 spans, having 30-foot spans atop the towers, and 30- or 65-foot spans between towers. After some initial problems with the concrete tower foundations, the ironwork of the single-tracked bridge was erected in only six weeks and completed on August 3, 1893.

Freight service over the whole length of the WB&E began on January 22, 1894, and through passenger service between Jersey City and Wilkes-Barre started on June 4, 1894. The latter was discontinued already in 1897, with mixed trains taking over local passenger business.

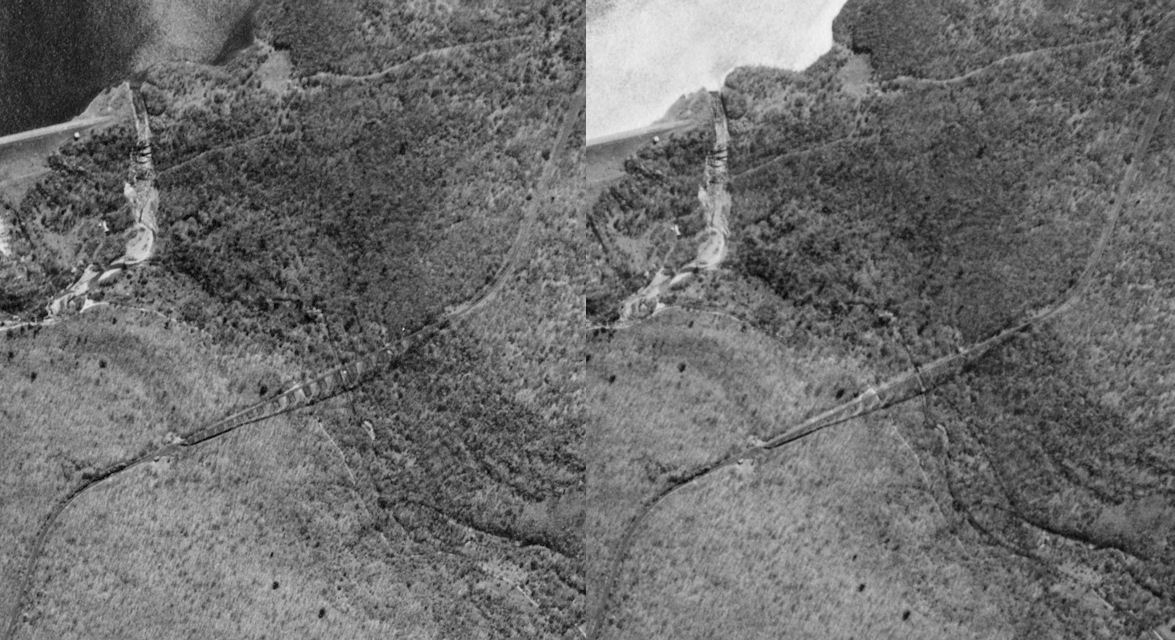
Stereogram of Panther Creek Viaduct

In 1896, the WB&E created the Susquehanna Connecting Railroad to connect its main line with additional coal breakers in Minooka and Old Forge. The connection with the WB&E was at Paddy's Land, later renamed Suscon Junction. The Erie Railroad and the Delaware and Hudson Railway also connected with the line in Moosic, Pennsylvania.

The WB&E was touted as the shortest route from the Scranton coalfields to the New York tidewater, being ten miles shorter than the shortest alternative route. However, its late entry into the region meant that the best routes were already taken, so the WB&E had grades and curves which limited the size and speed of its trains. After the Erie gained control of the NYS&W in 1898, it chose to divert traffic onto the Erie's Wyoming Division via the Susquehanna Connecting to Hillside Junction, and the WB&E eastward from Suscon slowly fell into disuse. Mixed train operation and hence passenger service ended on May 15, 1935.

Unable to pay the interest on its mortgage bonds, the WB&E filed for bankruptcy in 1937. Local freight train service continued to operate on the line up to four times a week until abandonment in March 1939. The Wilkes-Barre Connecting Railroad purchased the Susquehanna River bridge at Plains on August 1, 1940. Except for a small stub of track in Suscon, Pennsylvania and this bridge, little remains today of the WB&E.

== Historic remnants ==
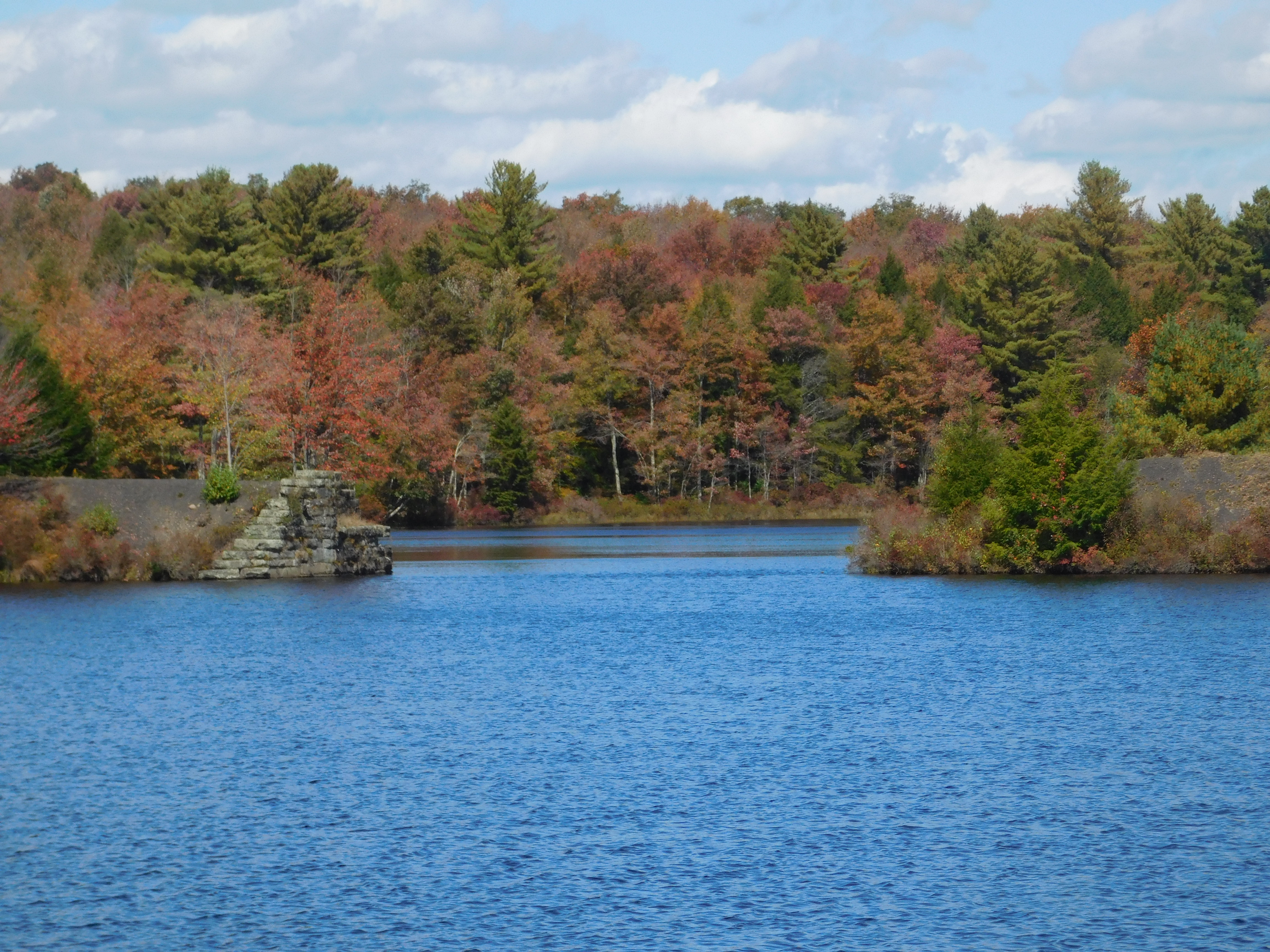
Former bridge over Pocono Lake, with the abutments remaining

While there are no operating sections of the WB&E extant today, one building from its car and locomotive shops (actually the NYS&W shops) was still standing at Stroudsburg in the former Katz Scrap Yard just adjacent to the south side of Interstate 80 until 2005. The Stroudsburg freight station, originally located at the present site of the Shop-Rite Supermarket, was moved to Ann Street, set up on the site of the former Stroudsburg Traction Company carbarn, restored, and converted into the Driebe Museum. In addition, the freight house at Pocono Lake still stands unused just off Route 940 in the defunct Frisbie Lumber Company yard and is visible from the road. Contrary to other reports, the present "Olde Engine Works" antique shop building in Stroudsburg had nothing to do with either the NYS&W or the WB&E, as it was simply a factory that manufactured electric motors used to power winches on fishing boats.

Motorists can trace the WB&E roadbed by following Route 940 west and some sections of I-380 north to the junction with I-80 in Mount Pocono. Long Pond Road near the village of Little Summit intersects with the right of way and was the location of a grade crossing. Following Route 940 west towards Pocono Pines, the roadbed is easily visible along the lake on the right as are remnants from a bridge. Much of the line is preserved on Pennsylvania State Game Lands and is easily hiked.
