= New York, Susquehanna and Western Railway =

American freight railway

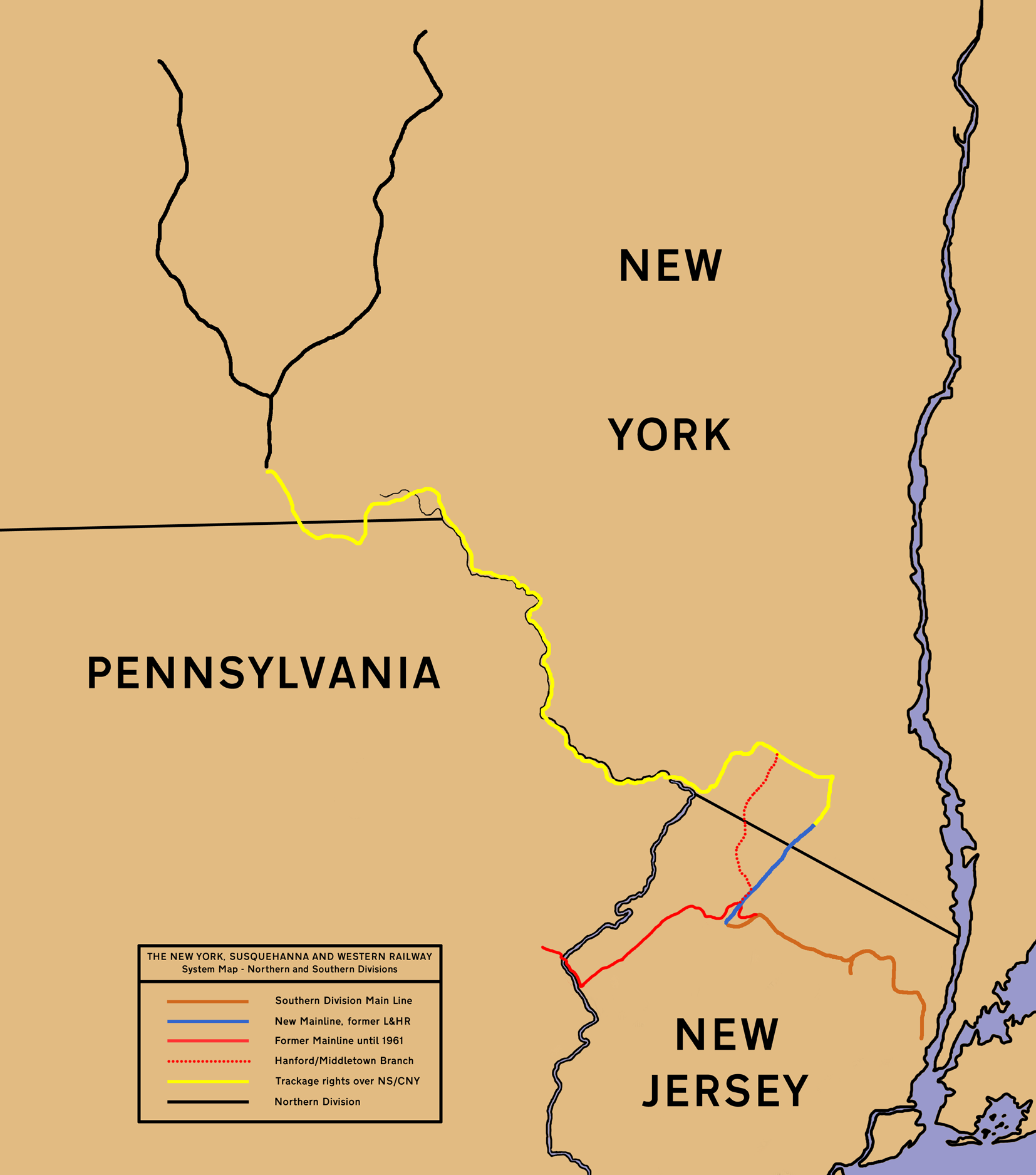
- Map of the New York, Susquehanna and Western Railway routes in New Jersey, New York, and Pennsylvania

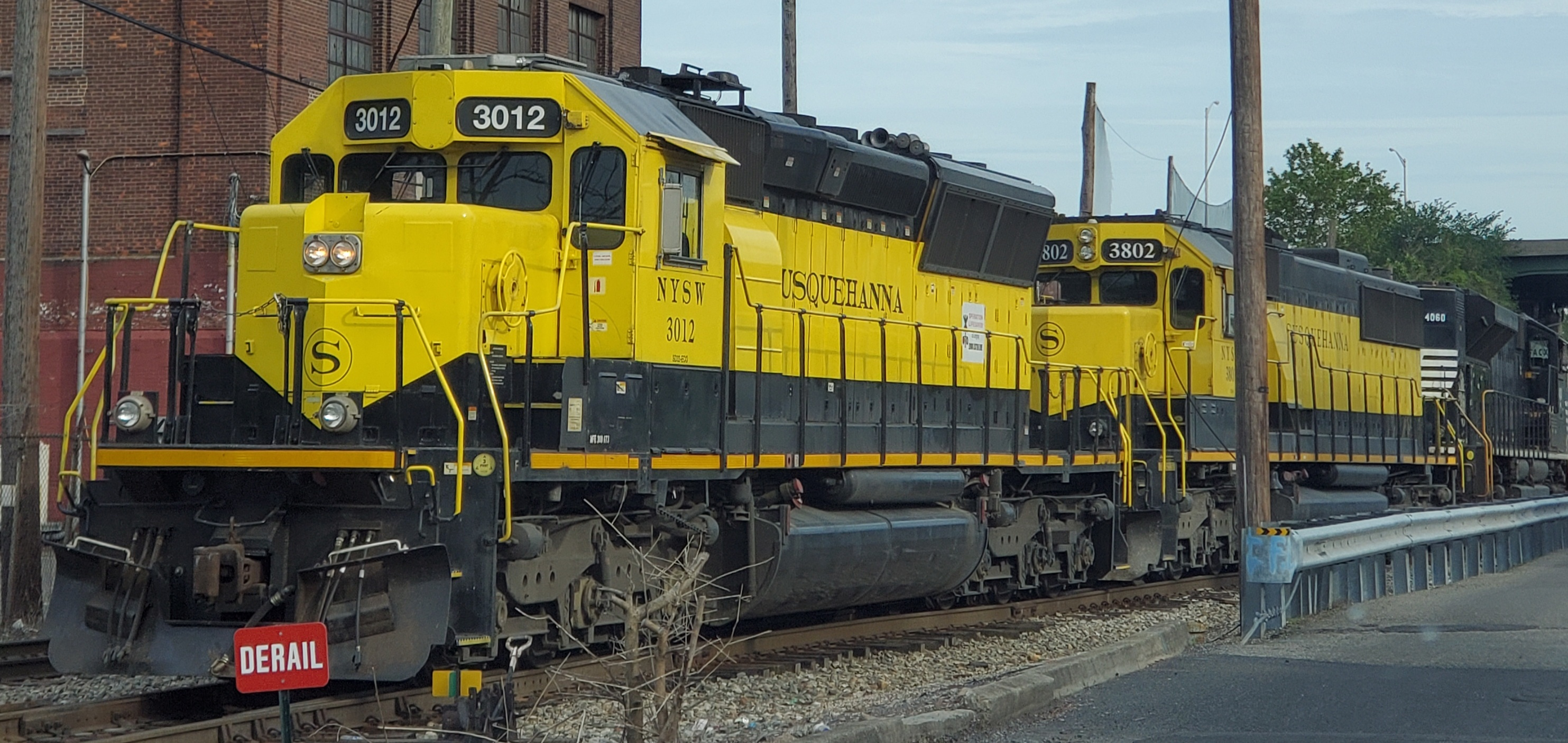
- NYS&W freight train No. SU-99 at Bogota, New Jersey, on June 2, 2021

Overview
- Headquarters: Cooperstown, New York, U.S.
- Reporting mark: NYSW
- Locale: New Jersey; New York; Pennsylvania, U.S.
- Dates of operation: 1881–present

Technical
- Track gauge: 4 ft 8 1/2 in (1,435 mm) standard gauge
- Length: 400 mi (640 km)

Other
- Website: www.nysw.com

The New York, Susquehanna and Western Railway (reporting mark NYSW), also referred to as the Susie-Q or the Susquehanna (/ˌsʌskwəˈhænə/ SUSS-kwə-HAN-ə; Lenape: Siskëwahane), and formerly the New York, Susquehanna and Western Railroad, is an American Class II freight railway operating over 400 miles (640 km) of trackage in the states of New Jersey, New York, and Pennsylvania.

The NYS&W was formed in 1881 out of a merger of six smaller railroads. After formation, the new NYS&W's primary business concern was transporting anthracite coal out of Pennsylvania's Wyoming Valley coal region, a business that would last into the twentieth century. From 1898 to 1940, the NYS&W operated as a subsidiary of the Erie Railroad after J. P. Morgan purchased a majority stake on the Erie's behalf. The Susquehanna emerged from the Erie's control in 1940 as part of a bankruptcy reorganization begun in 1937. Around this time the railroad began winding down its coal operations until finally discontinuing them completely in 1951.^{[a]} This followed years of declines in coal usage due to the rapid growth of the petroleum industry. The railroad had also proclaimed itself completely dieselized by 1945.^{[b]}

By the early 1950s, the NYS&W changed their primary source of income to their commuter trains. Running as far west as Butler, the railroad advertised a bus connection to New York City via Susquehanna Transfer beginning in late 1939, taking advantage of the recently opened Lincoln Tunnel. By 1955 however, passenger services were losing money for the company. All of their commuter services were discontinued in 1966, and by that time, the railroad experienced additional financial troubles from a loss of freight customers and interchange partners. The seventies spelled out even harder times for the railroad and it fell into its second bankruptcy by 1976.

Nearly abandoned by 1980, the NYS&W was purchased that year by the New York state based Delaware Otsego Corporation (DO). DO reorganized and expanded the railway's operations and finances through the 1980s. The Susquehanna benefited from DO's market shrewdness and Conrail's monopoly in the northeastern U.S., by operating competing intermodal trains until 1999, when Conrail was split between Norfolk Southern (NS) and CSX.

Since just after the DO takeover, the NYS&W has consisted of a southern division and a northern division. The southern division runs between Jersey City, New Jersey and Binghamton, New York, and contains what is left of the original NYS&W mainline in New Jersey. The northern division, formed by two branches north of Binghamton, serves Utica and Syracuse and was purchased in 1982. The two divisions are connected via trackage rights over a segment of the Southern Tier Line operated as the Central New York Railroad.

== History ==
=== Pre-company beginnings ===
The earliest origins of the New York, Susquehanna and Western Railway trace back to 1828, when John Langdon Sullivan surveyed the first route across northern New Jersey with the intent of transporting Pennsylvania coal by rail to industrial Paterson, New Jersey. While New Jersey industry had supply of iron ore, it needed local sources of coal to smelt it following shortages of British coal after the War of 1812. The Morris Canal had begun operation for this purpose by 1831, but was seasonal and slow; industry demanded better. Nothing was done with Sullivan's plans until the New Jersey, Hudson and Delaware Railroad (NJH&D) was chartered by a group of Paterson businessmen in 1832. Due to financial difficulties incurred during the Panic of 1837, the company did not construct anything until 1867, but its charter remained active. Further set back by the Panic of 1857, the railroad sold its charter to the Pennsylvania Coal Company. Following the events of the Civil War though, canals became disused, and a major railroad boom began throughout the United States.

By the mid-1860s, several companies were formed to create railroads across northern New Jersey. The earliest of these, the Hoboken, Ridgefield and Paterson Railroad (HR&P), was chartered in March of 1866 to connect Paterson with the ports along the Hudson River waterfront; various logistical issues ensured this company would not actually build anything. The most successful attempt was by the New Jersey Western Railroad (NJW), which was founded by Cornelius Wortendyke in 1867. That railroad began laying track at Hawthorne the following year. They soon completed a line between Hawthorne and Butler.

In 1866, the New York and Oswego Midland Railroad (NY&OM) was incorporated in New York State under the leadership of DeWitt Clinton Littlejohn. His plan was to provide a connection from New York City to the port city of Oswego, New York on Lake Ontario. Construction on their trackage began at Oswego two years later. However, Wortendyke had no charter to build in New Jersey, a necessity in reaching New York City.

The NJW quickly decided to shift its focus towards connecting their route with the NY&OM to benefit both railroads. Cornelius Wortendyke signed an agreement with DeWitt Littlejohn, where the two companies would lease and access each other's routes. By 1870, the NJW expanded westward from Hackensack to Hanford, but in doing so, they encountered the NJH&D^{[c]} and the Sussex Valley Railroad, which had already obtained resources and begun work. The Sussex Valley had been chartered in 1867 to build south from the New Jersey-New York state line to the Delaware Water Gap.

By 1870, all four railroads decided it would be convenient to consolidate the work that had already been completed, so they merged together to create the New Jersey Midland Railway (NJM or Midland). Concurrently, the NY&OM expanded to Middletown, New York, and they leased the Middletown, Unionville and Water Gap Railroad (MU&WG), since it had provided a connection between the NY&OM at Middletown and the NJM at Hanford. The first Midland train to Butler ran on April 27, 1871, with the first train between Jersey City and Middletown running May 1, 1872, having completed construction on their final stretch of trackage from Hackensack to Jersey City, using trackage rights over the Pennsylvania Railroad's New Jersey Rail Road and Transportation Company.

In 1872, the NJM formally became leased by the NY&OM. On July 9, 1873, the first train over the NY&OM and NJM was operated from Oswego to Jersey City. With the inaugural run, the two railroads created the third trunk railroad line to connect New York City and the Great Lakes region, but the ongoing Panic of 1873 quickly affected the finances of both companies, with the NY&OM falling under receivership.

The NY&OM suspended all lease payments, and their partnership with the NJM was quickly put to an end. The NY&OM was later reorganized as the New York, Ontario and Western Railway (NYO&W) in 1879, and they began forming a separate partnership with the West Shore Railroad (later the New York Central Railroad (NYC) to access New York City. The NJM took over the lease of the MU&WG, but in 1875, the NJM was also put into receivership from the after affects of the Panic, and James McCulloh and Garret Hobart served as the NJM's receivers.

=== Formation and expansion ===
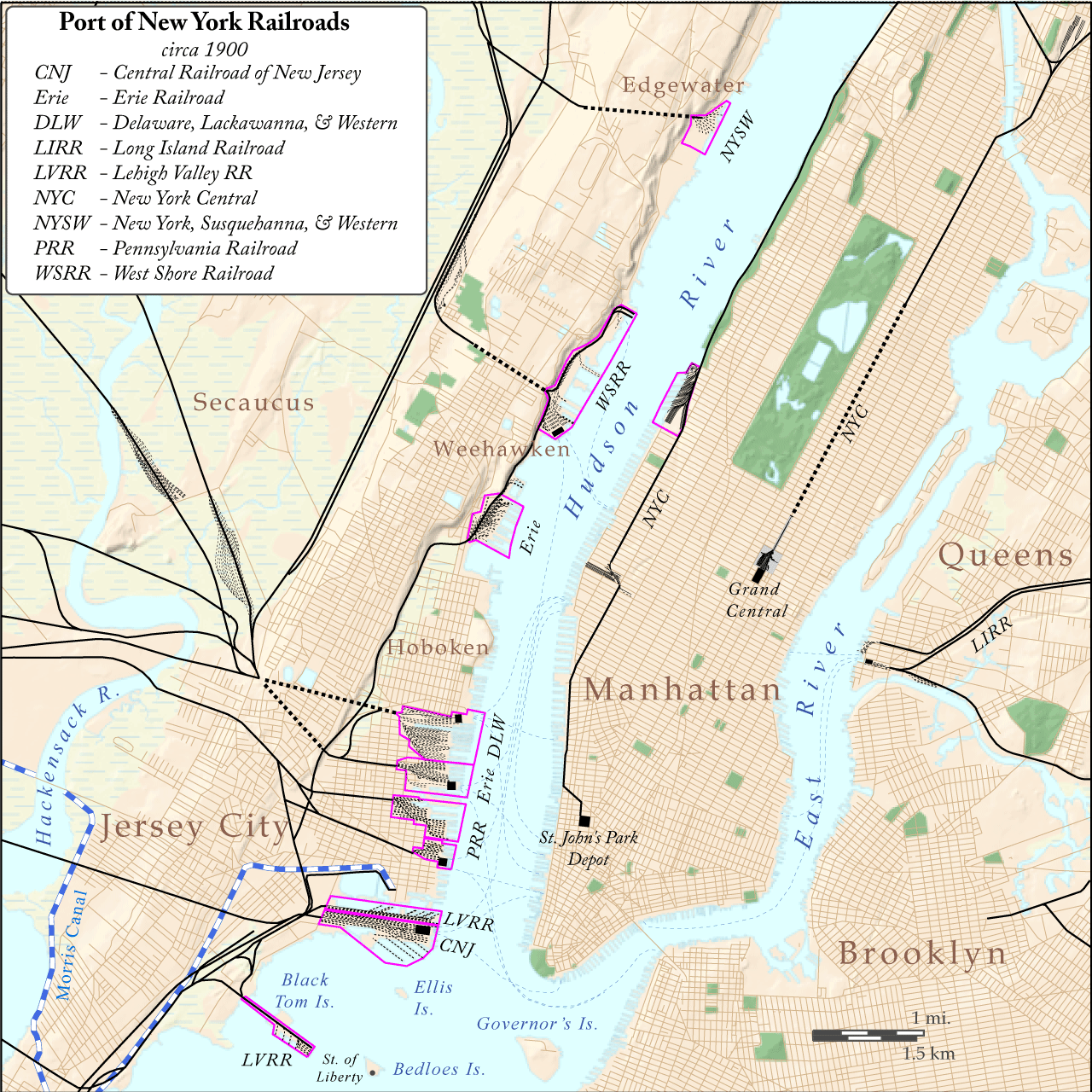
A New York City map that displays the terminus of various railroads, including the NYS&W at Edgewater, circa 1900

In 1880, investors from the original NJM regrouped and reorganized the company as the Midland Railroad of New Jersey, with Hobart serving as their president. The company regained their finances by serving New Jersey industrial firms. The investors decided to profit from hauling anthracite out of Pennsylvania as originally envisioned, and they chartered the New York and Scranton Construction Company to that end. That company in turn chartered four other small companies to lay down portions of the NJM route from New Jersey to Pennsylvania.

On June 17, 1881, the Midland Railroad of New Jersey was consolidated with five other companies to form the New York, Susquehanna and Western Railroad (NYS&W); "Susquehanna" was incorporated in the name, since one of the company's goals was to reach the Susquehanna River.

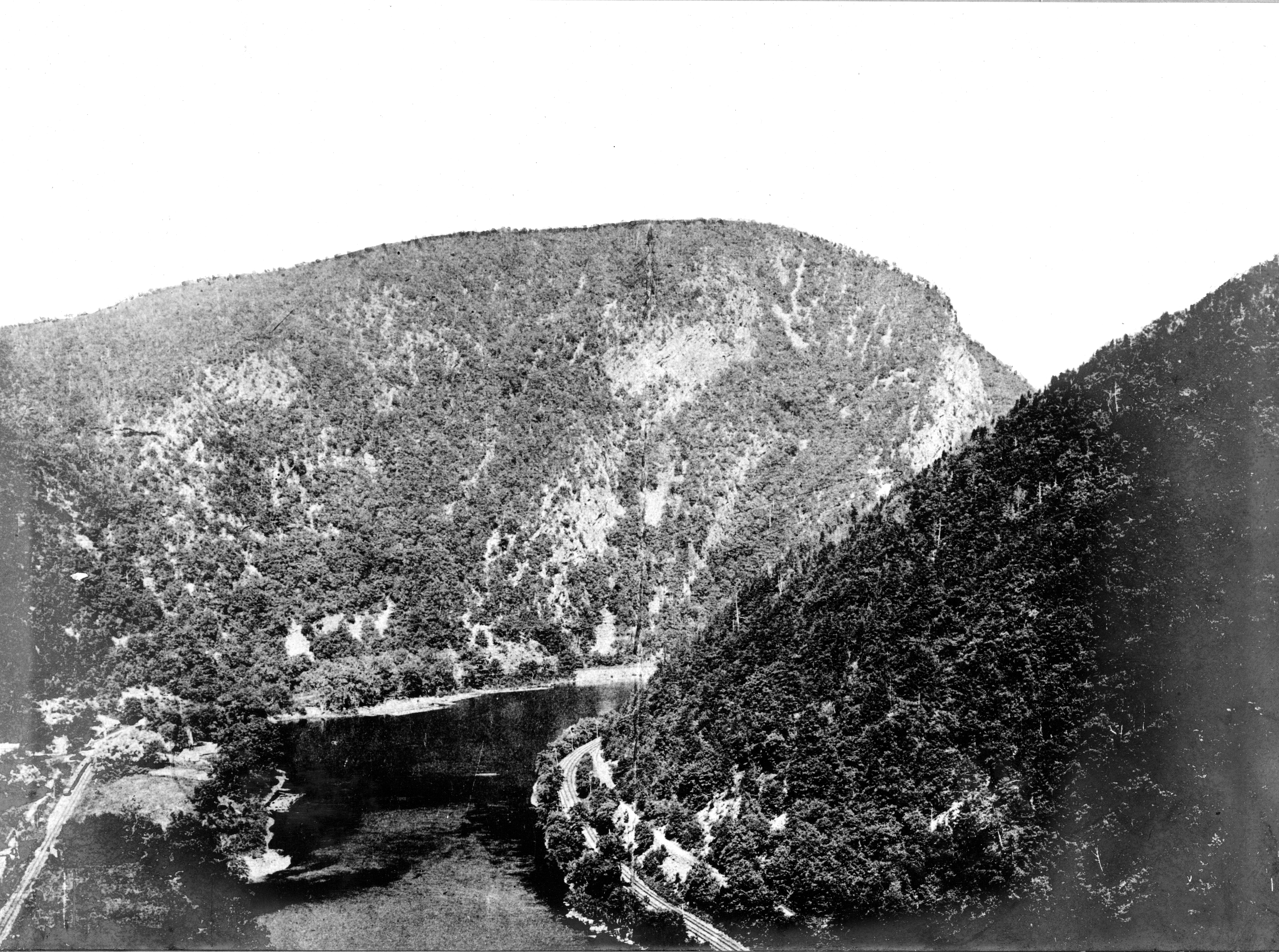
A view of the Delaware Water Gap with the NYS&W's Dunnfield station area visible at bottom left. The Lackawanna Railroad is on the right (Pennsylvania) bank.

In 1882, the new NYS&W railroad extended westward to Gravel Place, Pennsylvania, but they were originally reluctant to extend through the Pocono Mountains. They began to outsource their coal traffic to the Delaware, Lackawanna and Western Railroad (DL&W, interchanging with them at Stroudsburg. To reach the Hudson River waterfront ports, the NYS&W would transfer their coal traffic to the Pennsylvania Railroad at Marion Junction via the Hudson Connecting Railway.

The NYS&W also began operating passenger trains. By the late 1880s, the NYS&W's profitability boomed from their coal-hauling business and from their industrial and farm customers. In 1887, the railroad laid down a double-track route from Paterson to Jersey City to accommodate their rising traffic.

In 1892, the Susquehanna ended their transfer partnerships with the DL&W and the PRR, when they extended their own line eastward from their Little Ferry Yard to a new coal terminal at Edgewater. The railroad also began leasing their own newly chartered Wilkes-Barre and Eastern Railroad (WB&E) between Stroudsburg and Wilkes-Barre in late 1893. This railroad was chartered for the NYS&W to have direct coal mine access. In 1896, the NYS&W chartered the Susquehanna Connecting Railroad to further access the Wyoming Valley as a branch line from the WB&E north to Minooka

The Lehigh and New England Railroad (L&NE) was formed in 1895 as a bridge line between eastern Pennsylvania and New England. Its route through the Great Appalachian Valley in New Jersey was finally negotiated with trackage rights over the Susquehanna between Hainesburg Junction, near the Paulinskill Viaduct, and Swartswood Junction, near Newton. This provided a source of revenue for the railroad until the L&NE folded in 1961.

=== Erie Railroad control ===
Map of the NYS&W under the Erie Railroad

The NYS&W's prosperity caught the attention of influential financer J. P. Morgan, who used his Erie Railroad as a means to control the Susquehanna. The Erie already had access to coal mines north of Scranton, but they also desired access to the mines south of the area, and they believed the Susquehanna provided the best route there via its Wilkes Barre and Eastern.

On behalf of the Erie, Morgan quietly purchased the NYS&W's stock until he obtained the majority of their shares. By July 1898, the Erie Railroad took over control of all of the Susquehanna's operations, making the NYS&W their subsidiary.

In 1908, the Susquehanna purchased their final new steam locomotive, 2-8-0 No. 140, from the Baldwin Locomotive Works; all of their subsequent steam locomotives were either leased or purchased second-hand from the Erie.

In 1911, the Susquehanna's Jersey City passenger terminus was moved from the PRR's Exchange Place Station to the Erie's Pavonia Terminal, and their freight terminus was moved from the PRR's Marion yards to the Erie's Croxton yards. By 1923, the Susquehanna's total gross income peaked at $5.5 million.

The Erie subsequently invested in rebuilding and upgrading the NYS&W's trackage and bridges. During the 1920s, the Erie began operating under the control of the Van Sweringen brothers, and they installed a new president for the Erie, John J. Bernet. During Bernet's tenure for the Erie, he initiated a major modernization program for the Susquehanna; most of the railroad's original steam locomotives and wooden passenger cars were scrapped and replaced with newer Erie equipment.

Throughout the 1930s, the NYS&W experienced some major financial problems from the Great Depression, and the Erie began to neglect them. The general demand for anthracite coal was declining, and while other anthracite-hauling railroads were able to change their freight priorities, the NYS&W struggled to follow suit.

During 1937, the railroad defaulted on some major bonds and taxes they owed, and on June 1, they filed for bankruptcy and reorganization. That same month, the bankruptcy court appointed two co-trustees to the NYS&W; Walter Kidde and Hudson Bordwell, but the latter died only five months into his position, making the former their sole trustee.

Walter Kidde, who had no prior experience in operating railroads, began to explore ways of reorganizing the NYS&W and its assets. The first task he did was to terminate the company's lease of the Wilkes-Barre and Eastern, effectively ending their anthracite coal operations, and the WB&E was quickly shut down and ripped up, after they filed for their own bankruptcy.

He also entrusted ownership of the Susquehanna Connecting Railroad to the Erie. In 1938, Kidde discontinued a portion of the NYS&W's commuter passenger services. By March 1940, Kidde arranged other cutbacks for the Susquehanna, which resulted in the company being spun-off from the Erie's control.

=== Walter Kidde-Henry Norton reorganization ===
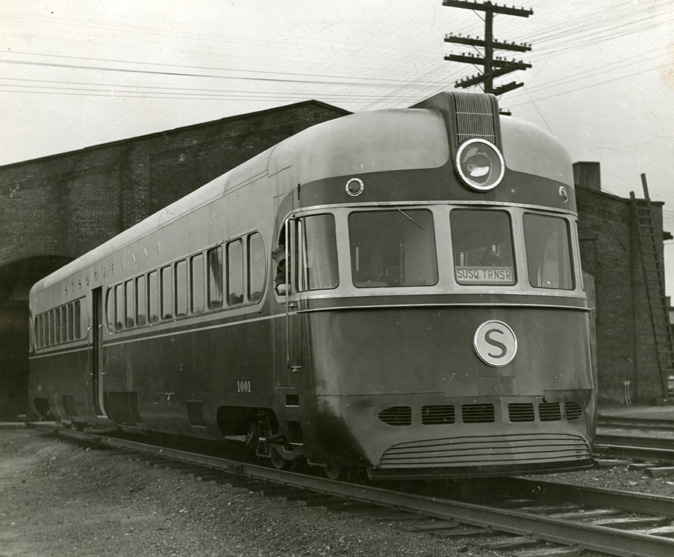
New York, Susquehanna and Western Railway streamlined self propelled diesel powered rail car constructed by the American Car and Foundry company, c. 1940

Following the abandonment of the WB&E, the NYS&W did not see any benefit in continuing their Pennsylvania operations, and in 1941 they cut back the western end of the line back twelve miles from Stroudsburg to Hainesburg, New Jersey, preserving the L&NE connection there (and its revenue). Walter Kidde decided to have the Susquehanna improve their remaining suburban commuter passenger trains and make profits from providing bus services to Manhattan, and Susquehanna Transfer service began in late 1939, for this purpose.

Kidde also opted to dieselize the NYS&W's locomotive roster to reduce their operating costs. In June 1940, they began to purchase some streamlined self-propelled rail cars from the American Car and Foundry Company (ACF) to cover their commuter services. In 1941, the NYS&W began to order some S-2 switchers and RS-1 road switchers from the American Locomotive Company (ALCO) to supersede their steam locomotives. A precedent was quickly set on the NYS&W, where all of their diesels with multiple-unit controls would only receive even road numbers, while all of their non-multiple-unit diesels would only receive odd road numbers.

The Susquehanna also settled a $7 million freight balance debt they owed the Erie by paying them $250,000 and purchasing their freight terminal in Edgewater. The railroad also obtained money from World War II, by providing an effective coastal coal barge route out of Edgewater, to aid a major coal shortage in Great Britain, since a similar route out of Norfolk, Virginia, was blocked by the 1942 submarine menace.

In February 1943 Kidde died. His deputy and executive officer Henry K. Norton succeeded him as the Susquehanna's trustee, and he opted to continue Kidde's restructuring plans for the company. By June 1945, almost all of the Susquehanna's remaining steam locomotives had either been retired or sold off, and they declared themselves as the first Class I railroad in the United States to completely dieselize. Three locomotives, 2-10-0s Nos. 2435, 2461, and 2492, were retained as yard switchers, until they were also retired by October 1947.

After World War II ended, coal continued to be shipped from Edgewater to Europe, in accordance with the Marshall Plan, until the NYS&W shut down their coal terminal in 1948. During that time, the railroad signed a contract with Seatrain Lines to provide rolling stock-shipping services at Edgewater.

By November 1951, the Susquehanna's entire passenger car fleet was replaced with stainless steel cars, their entire streamlined rail car fleet was replaced with Budd Rail Diesel Cars, and many of their passenger stations were revamped. On June 3, 1953, the NYS&W emerged from bankruptcy and completed its reorganization process, having reduced their capitalization from $42 million to $16 million. Norton subsequently became the NYS&W's newest president, as a reward for his and Kidde's restructuring methods.

=== 1955-1961 financial troubles ===
Two years later, in 1955, stockholders voted to have Norton demoted to chairman and replaced by former Chicago Great Western vice-president James M. Baths due to Norton's excessively-progressive foresight. In December that same year, the railroad chose a new head: Ralph E. Sease, a former Central of Georgia executive.

By that time, the Susquehanna had run all of their passenger trains at a financial loss due to declining ridership and competition from a new park and ride service. The railroad considered filing an application to discontinue their passenger services. Further revenues were lost after a primary customer, the Ford Motor Company, closed their Edgewater assembly plant.

Following the Recession of 1957, the NYS&W experienced additional financial problems, and a portion of their other freight customers abandoned the railroad to begin relying on truck shipping. Sease opted to arrange some cutbacks for the company, which involved discontinuing a number of their commuter services and moving their Jersey City passenger terminus from the Erie's Pavonia Terminal to the DL&W's Hoboken Terminal.

The NYS&W subsequently sold off its Budd passenger cars and replaced them with used second-hand equipment. One of the other cutbacks was the abandonment of the Hanford Branch, the remains of the original NJM-NY&OM route. It had lost its farm traffic to the recession, and long-time interchange partner NYO&W had shut down.

In 1961, another one of the NYS&W's long-time interchange partners, the Lehigh and New England Railroad (L&NE), ceased operations as well. The following year, the NYS&W consequently abandoned its route between Hainesburg and Sparta Junction. The route was later ripped up and became part of the Paulinskill Valley Trail.

=== Irving Maidman ownership ===
In October 1962, the NYS&W was purchased by New York real estate developer and millionaire Irving Maidman. Maidman previously acquired the former Ford Edgewater plant for use as a rental warehouse, and since the NYS&W served the building, Maidman opted to purchase the majority of the railroad's shares to ensure their freight services in Edgewater remained active.

The first task Maidman did for the NYS&W was to obtain a $550,000 federal loan for the purchase of three EMD GP18 road switchers to assist the NYS&W's failing ALCO locomotives. In 1963, Maidman became the NYS&W's newest board chairman and chief executive officer (CEO), and he began to install new executives for the railroad, including his wife Edith Shivitz and his son and attorney Robert Maidman. The management changes also involved Ralph Sease resigning from his president position and being replaced by John P. Clark.

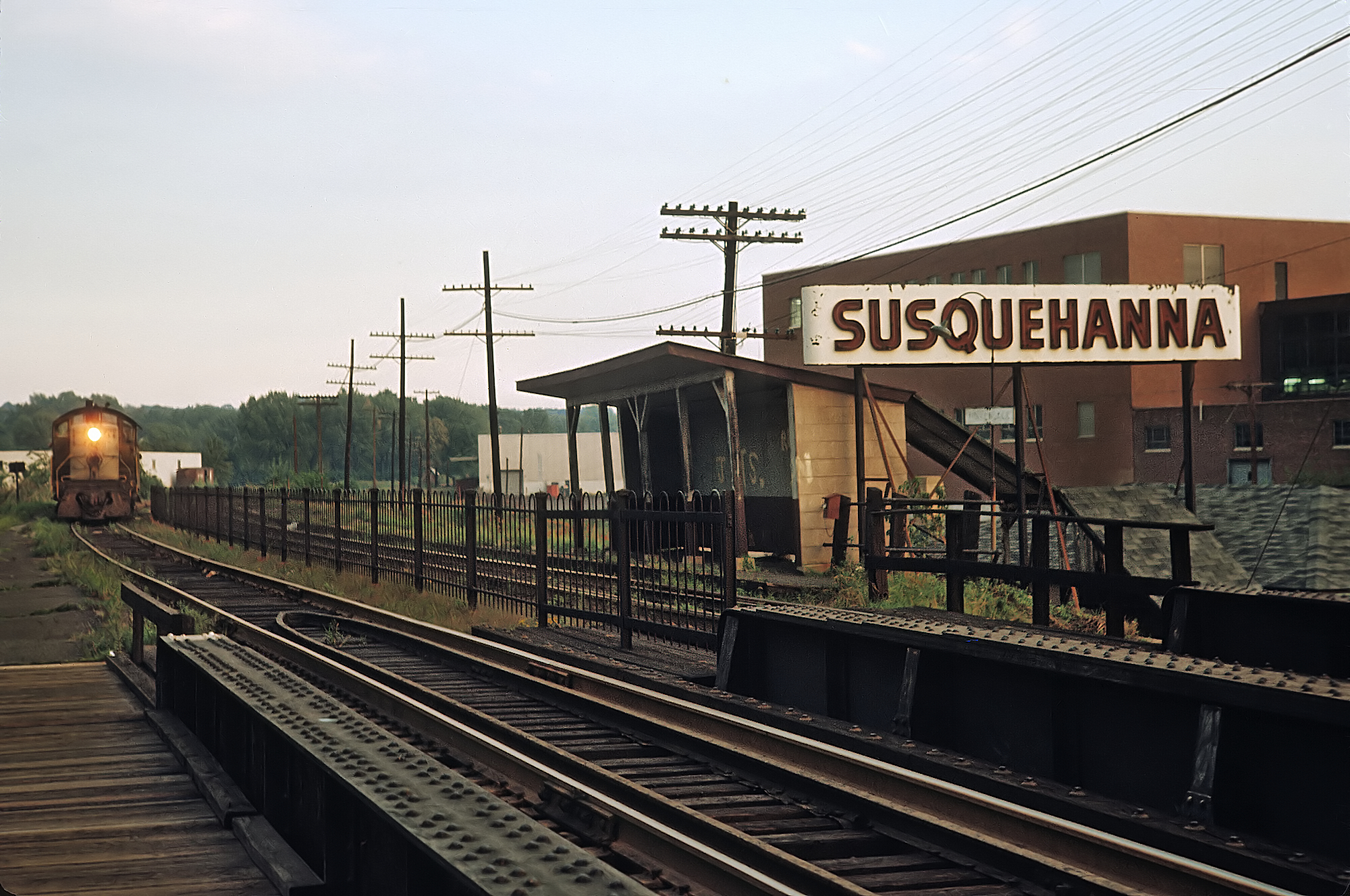
ALCO RS-1 No. 236 leading a suburban commuter train at Hackensack, New Jersey, September 1965; the following year, on June 30, 1966, the NYS&W terminated all passenger operations.

That same year, Maidman began to have the NYS&W prioritize on serving his warehouse business, but the railroad consequently began to neglect their other stockholders and the rest of their remaining freight customers. Maintenance on the NYS&W's infrastructure also became deferred, and in ensuing years it resulted in derailments and slower deliveries. This in turn resulted in additional customers abandoning the railroad.

Maidman also arranged for the NYS&W to sell some of their land properties to other businesses Maidman owned, and they began to lease some new land property in Edgewater for use as backup storage. He also discontinued all of the NYS&W's bus services, and he filed a petition to the state of New Jersey to terminate all of the railroad's commuter services. As a desperate attempt to eliminate all ridership, Maidman personally offered to pay the NYS&W's 200 remaining commuters $1,000 each to stop using their trains, but only five of them accepted.

Maidman's tactics were challenged by commuters, and the State of New Jersey argued on their behalf against the railroad at the US Supreme Court in December of 1963. A 9-0 decision kept passenger service continuing at the time. However, by June 1966, the NYS&W obtained court permission to terminate all of their passenger services, despite commuters' continuing efforts to keep them running. The railroad's final commuter train operated on June 30 with only a day's notice, and the following day, uninformed commuters waited to board NYS&W trains that never arrived.

Around that time, Maidman considered retiring and selling 90% of the NYS&W's interest while retaining 10%. In doing so, he petitioned the Interstate Commerce Commission (ICC) to have the NYS&W involved in the Pennsylvania Railroad-New York Central merger. The ICC in turn asked the PRR and NYC to include the Susquehanna, along with the bankrupt New York, New Haven and Hartford Railroad (New Haven) in the merger as a condition. Both railroads agreed, since the Susquehanna provided a major connection between the PRR and NYC in New Jersey.

The new Penn Central Transportation Company (PC) was formally created on February 1, 1968, and the New Haven was folded in on December 31 of that year. The NYS&W was excluded. Their inclusion fell through due to a dispute between Maidman and PC's management over the railroad's price value; Maidman wanted to sell the NYS&W for its business value, while PC's management wanted to purchase it for its salvage value. In March 1969, the NYS&W withdrew their ICC application to save costs and continue independently.

By December 1968, the Susquehanna turned a profit for the first time since 1955, with an income of $17,755. That same year, the railroad lost another interchange partner, the Lehigh and Hudson River Railway (L&HR), when their Station Road bridge in Sparta was deemed unsafe. The Susquehanna had to cut back their Sparta route to Oak Ridge. Also in that same year, Seatrain Lines breached their shipping contract with the NYS&W by moving their shipyard operations from Edgewater to Brooklyn for a separate partnership with the U.S. government, and Maidman sued Seatrain for $4.8 million in compensatory damages.

The NYS&W also sued the Erie's successor, the Erie Lackawanna Railway (EL), for $1.6 million in unpaid usage of Susquehanna trackage, but they subsequently settled for a $186,315 claim, and the EL agreed to pay a $15,000 yearly fee. By the end of 1969, the NYS&W turned a profit of $297,644. In 1970, NYS&W executive William T. Frazier became the railroad's newest president, after the position had been changed three times within the previous five years.

In 1971, the NYS&W lost their interchange with the Central Railroad of New Jersey (CNJ) at Green Pond Junction, when a stretch of trackage at Smoke Rise was washed away and mud-covered by Tropical Storm Doria. Following the damage from Doria along with that from Hurricane Agnes the following year, the Susquehanna began operating at a financial loss again, and the condition of their remaining trackage worsened. Concurrently, Irving Maidman also began to lose money from his other businesses, and he began intentionally defaulting on property taxes owed to the state of New Jersey and Citibank, believing they were overcharging him.

In mid-1975, William Frazier became hospitalized for cancer treatment. In August, Maidman ransacked Fraizer's desk and discovered that since 1971, Frazier, along with chief engineer Joseph J. Novellino, both defrauded the railroad with fake bills for personal gain and funding for Novellino's private business. The board of directors quickly voted to have Frazier resign, and Maidman became the Susquehanna's president. In September, Maidman, along with his son Robert, convinced the NYS&W's board of directors to purchase $2 million in general mortgage bonds from W. E. Hutton & Co. while secretly arranging the transaction to bail Maidman out of a major debt he owed Hutton.

=== Second bankruptcy protection ===
By January 1976, the NYS&W defaulted on $252,498 of business and property taxes owed to the state of New Jersey, and they were forced to file for section 77 bankruptcy. By that time, the NYS&W railroad was cut down to a 43-mile (69 km) line from Croton and Edgewater through Paterson to Butler. Simultaneously, Conrail was being developed to assume control of many other bankrupt railroads in the northeastern U.S., but the NYS&W was not included.

The Securities and Exchange Commission began to investigate the NYS&W's operations, and they quickly discovered that the railroad's purchase of their $2 million bond on Irving Maidman's behalf was in fact stock fraud. The bankruptcy court quickly confiscated control of the railroad from Maidman and appointed Walter G. Scott as the railroad's new trustee. Maidman's other businesses, including the Edgewater warehouse, were also confiscated by other creditors. By June 1977, Maidman's final remaining source of income was his new limited position on the NYS&W as a real-estate consultant. Scott began to rearrange the NYS&W's operations and assets; the railroad suspended all land leases Maidman began, they prioritized the maintenance of their locomotives and trackage, and they hired new industrial customers. Some other members of the new court-appointed management team believed the NYS&W would be able to regain its finances by serving as an alternative to Conrail's services.

Maidman, who often quarreled with Scott, had hopes of regaining control of the railroad before selling it on his own after it emerged from bankruptcy. He said to The Record "I expect to straighten things out. I'll get the railroad back. I'll tell Scott to go to hell." However, in June 1978, Maidman became physically weakened and hospitalized following a car accident. In October 1979, he died at the age of 82. During that time the NYS&W continued to financially struggle; track had deteriorated to the point that it held a 10-mile-per-hour (16 km/h) speed restriction. The Federal Railroad Administration (FRA) banned the NYS&W from shipping hazardous materials on their trackage as a safety precaution.

On November 21, 1979, the railroad's creditors decided to petition the ICC to shut it down and begin liquidation by February 1, 1980. The NYS&W's remaining customers appealed the petition, since they envisioned the shut down would result in 6,000 jobs being lost across the state. A public hearing subsequently postponed the railroad's closure throughout 1980. On August 15, the ICC authorized the closure, and the NYS&W railroad's final revenue train operated on August 29.

=== Delaware Otsego acquisition and expansion ===
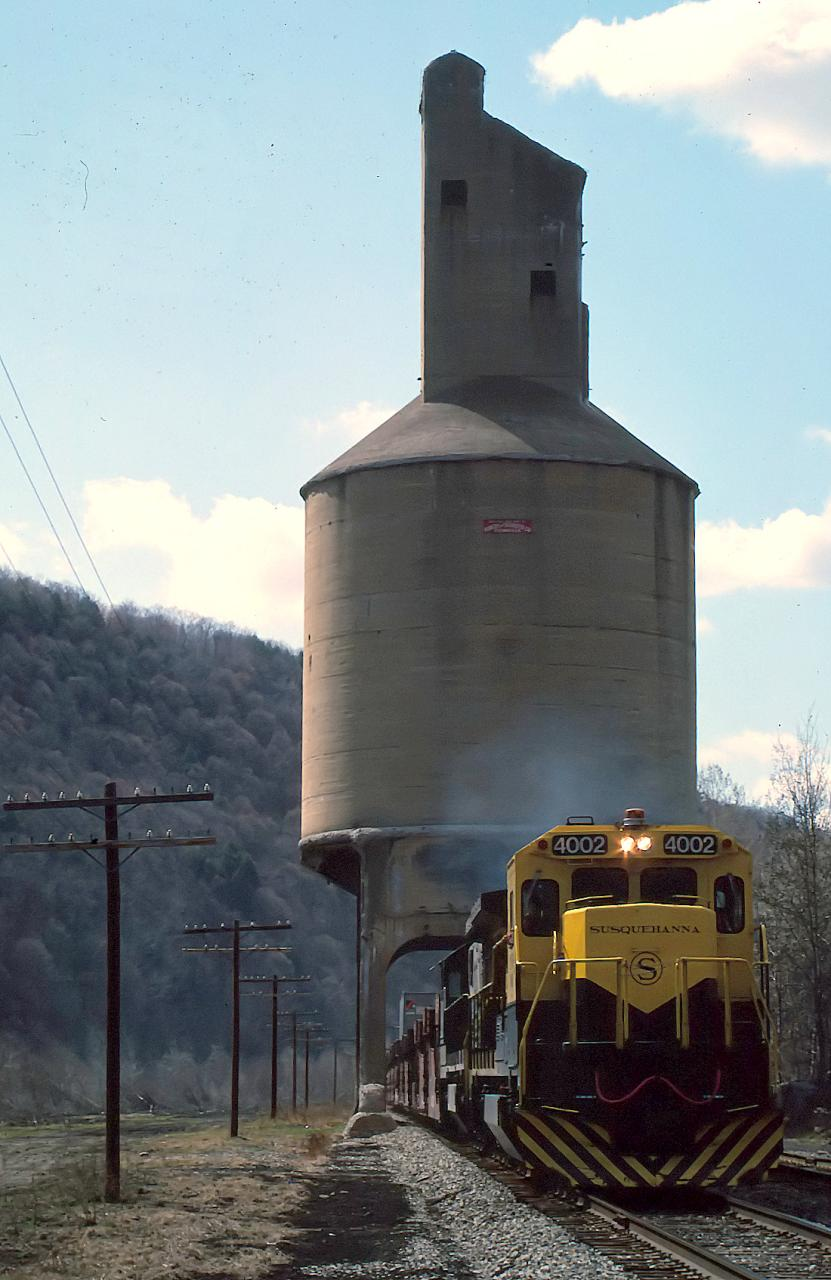
NYS&W No. 4002, a GE Dash 8-40B leased from CSX, leading a westbound intermodal train at Susquehanna, Pennsylvania, April 1989

In 1966, the Delaware Otsego Corporation (DO) was founded by a group of businessmen and railfans led by Walter G. Rich. DO's original venture was operating tourist trains over a 2.6-mile (4.2 km) section of the New York Central's abandoned Ulster and Delaware branch near Oneonta, New York. In 1971, after the section was ripped up in favor of Interstate 88's construction, DO purchased the 16-mile (26 km) Cooperstown branch from the Delaware and Hudson Railway (D&H) and began operating it as the Cooperstown and Charlotte Valley Railroad (CACV).

Within ensuing years, DO's tourist operations were shut down from low ridership, and they pivoted to reactivating abandoned branch lines as short line freight railroads, finding this profitable. Throughout the 1970s and 1980s, DO acquired and leased multiple short lines: in 1972 they acquired the Erie Lackawanna's Richfield Springs branch and began operating it as the Central New York Railroad (CNYK) until 1988,^{[d]} from 1974 to 1984 they owned and operated the Fonda, Johnstown and Gloversville Railroad (FJ&G), and from 1976 to 1989 they were contracted to operate the Lackawaxen and Stourbridge Railroad (LASB) in the northern Pocono Mountains, DO's first venture outside New York State.

By 1979, DO's shortline renovations caught the attention of New Jersey state and county officials, who were exploring ways of having the NYS&W continue operations under new ownership. They asked DO to submit a proposal to purchase the NYS&W, and in turn, DO sent a team of inspectors to evaluate the railroad's trackage.

Two other parties also offered to purchase the railroad, but in June 1980, the bankruptcy court accepted DO's $5 million offer. On September 1, DO took over the NYS&W's operations under lease before purchasing all of their assets two years later. DO quickly rebranded the railroad as the New York, Susquehanna and Western Railway, with Walter Rich becoming their newest president and CEO. He opted to retain the New York, Susquehanna and Western name out of his fondness for the New York, Ontario & Western. The first NYS&W train under Delaware Otsego operated on September 2, 1980.

That same year, DO established their own real-estate unit to begin arranging for the NYS&W to lease and sell line-side land property that was deemed unessential for railroad purposes. Within the next two years, the NYS&W retained their status quo in serving industrial customers, having kept most of their pre-DO executives and employees. DO and the New Jersey Department of Transportation (NJDOT) jointly funded a $1.35 million reconditioning of the NYS&W's trackage. By that time, seven of the NYS&W's twenty-seven locomotives were still operable: three GP18s, three RS-1s, and one S-2; the rest had deteriorated outdoors and were subsequently scrapped.

In 1982 the NYS&W sold most of the deteriorating Edgewater branch, but continued to maintain and operate it until October 1989, when it was shut down from a lack of customers and unsafe conditions in its tunnel. The Edgewater yard on the Hudson waterfront was subsequently ripped up and redeveloped as a shopping mall and condominium complex, and the tunnel, retained as a Susquehanna-owned right of way, began to house a pipeline for the Amerada Hess Corporation.

Following the Staggers Rail Act of 1980, Conrail began to abandon many of their routes to streamline their operations. This included their former DL&W Binghamton-Jamesville and Binghamton-Utica branches in New York, their former L&HR Warwick-Franklin route, and their former Erie Greenwood Lake Branch in New Jersey. DO feared the abandonment of the Utica branch would landlock their CNYK railroad, and they were interested in further expanding their operations. They contacted the routes' customers for freight potential, and negotiated with Conrail to purchase them.

On April 16, 1982, the ICC approved DO's $4.2 million purchase of the routes from Conrail, and they commenced operations under Delaware Otsego the following day. The two former DL&W branches out of Binghamton quickly became the NYS&W's Northern Division, and the former L&HR route, the Greenwood Lake Branch, and the NYS&W's remaining original trackage in New Jersey became labeled as their Southern Division.

To connect the two divisions, DO arranged a haulage rights agreement with Conrail, where once-a-week NYS&W trains would operate over a portion of Conrail's Southern Tier Line between Binghamton and Passaic Junction in Saddle Brook, New Jersey, using Conrail crews. If Conrail chose to terminate their haulage rights contract, a trackage rights agreement would be exercised, involving the restoration and usage of the NYS&W's route between Butler and Sparta Junction, which had been completely shut down since the early 1970s.

To cover the Northern Division operations, one GP18 was transferred over, and DO purchased some ALCO locomotives second-hand: one RS-3 from the recently closed Adirondack Railway; two C420s from a holding firm owned by Tony Hannold; and five C430s from Conrail. In July 1983, the first NYS&W haulage train operated over Conrail, as per the haulage agreement. That same year, DO established a new subsidiary, Susquehanna Properties, Inc., to expand the NYS&W's land-leasing program. Customers who had solely relied on truck-shipping began to purchase Susquehanna property and construct line-side facilities for rail services.

The railroad also put a portion of their Little Ferry Yard up for lease and redevelopment, since most freight classification operations had been moved to Passaic Junction. By that time, Walter Rich reported to his fellow stockholders that reorganizing the NYS&W helped DO expand from a short line operation to a regional railroad network. In 1985, Conrail filed their former L&HR route between Franklin and Belvidere for abandonment. DO and Sussex County jointly purchased a portion of the route between Franklin and Lime Crest to serve its remaining customers, and to preserve the NYS&W-L&HR interchange at Sparta Junction.

=== Launch of intermodal trains ===
In 1984, Delaware Otsego began negotiating with SeaLand, an international shipping corporation, to form an intermodal container-shipping partnership. Emphasizing the Susquehanna's Little Ferry yard location's proximity to major highways and the metro New York City area, they offered to lease part of the yard for use as a container facility. SeaLand previously negotiated with Conrail for the partnership, but they were unimpressed with Conrail's terms where only their container facilities would be used; SeaLand preferred to establish their own facility.

In 1985, SeaLand signed a contract with the NYS&W where they would lease 22 acres (110,000 square yards) of their Little Ferry property for twenty years, and they quickly began construction on their new facility. At the same time, the NYS&W signed a partnership contract with the D&H and CSX to ship SeaLand trains from Little Ferry to Chicago, Illinois.

On August 5, 1985, the NYS&W operated their first SeaLand intermodal train. It was quickly followed by many other trains bound between Little Ferry and the western U.S., and for shipping east of Little Ferry, the containers were shipped via truck to nearby shipyards. The intermodal operations quickly boosted the NYS&W's income by 125%, and the following year, the railway turned a profit of $3.2 million out of a gross take of $19 million.

DO decided to purchase some additional diesels to accommodate their expanding intermodal operations. They originally planned to purchase four ALCO C636s from Conrail, but after some coaxing from CSX for compatible motive power, DO instead purchased a fleet of EMD SD45s and F45s from GATX, which previously leased them to the Burlington Northern Railroad (BN). The NYS&W subsequently began to retire their ALCO diesel roster.

Despite Conrail being kept out of the partnership, the NYS&W still used Conrail trackage and crews, as per their haulage agreement. Conrail became slightly agitated by having to haul competing intermodal trains. On April 1, 1986, Conrail renewed their haulage contract with the NYS&W with higher rates, hoping the railway would quietly abandon their intermodal operations. In doing so, Conrail allowed the NYS&W the opportunity to restore their Butler-Sparta route and to exercise their proposed trackage rights agreement. DO quickly initiated a rehabilitation and upgrade program on the embargoed original NYS&W route, along with their former L&HR trackage, in order to accommodate the new mainline intermodal traffic. The rehabilitation process lasted six months and cost $8 million to complete, for which the railway utilized a grant from NJDOT and a low-interest loan from the FRA.

In October, the upgrades were completed. The NYS&W began to use DO crews to operate haulage trains under their new trackage rights agreement over Conrail's Southern Tier Line between Binghamton and Campbell Hall, and over Conrail's L&HR line to the new NYS&W-Conrail interchange at Warwick. Two derailments subsequently occurred on the Butler-Sparta route from some incomplete trackage, but they were quickly repaired, and no further accidents were reported.

=== 1988-1995 expansion ===
In 1988, the Norfolk Southern Railway (NS) partnered with Hanjin to operate intermodal trains between North Bergen, New Jersey and Chicago, subcontracting the NYS&W and the D&H to haul the trains between North Bergen and Buffalo, New York. In June that same year, the Delaware and Hudson filed for bankruptcy via their parent company, Guilford Transportation Industries. They disbanded the D&H following two labor strikes. To preserve their intermodal partnership, Rich convinced the bankruptcy court to appoint the NYS&W to take over the D&H and their operations.

CSX gave the NYS&W some financial support to operate the D&H by underwriting their financial losses and leasing a fleet of GE Dash 8-40Bs. The NYS&W also gained access to the D&H's trackage rights over Conrail from Binghamton to Buffalo. In 1991, the bankruptcy court began accepting bids to purchase the D&H, and DO made an offer, losing out to the Canadian Pacific Railway (CPR). CPR succeeded the D&H in the NYS&W's intermodal partnership.

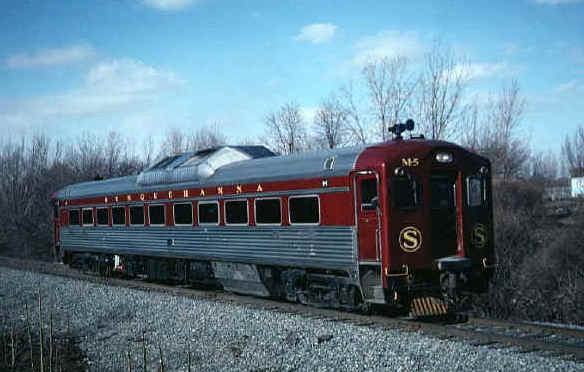
RDC No. M-5 operates for the NYS&W's OnTrack shuttle commuter service in Syracuse, February 3, 1996. No. M-5 resides at the Conway Scenic Railroad.

In 1992, the NYS&W installed various freight transloading facilities for their industrial customers in New Jersey, to diversify their freight operations. From 1992 to 1994, the NYS&W operated their intermodal trains at a $4.1 million loss, since the intermodal-shipping industry was affected by the early 1990s recession.

The NYS&W reversed their losses by renewing their intermodal contracts with NS and CSX to increase their intermodal traffic, and the NYS&W and NS began to jointly haul container-on-flatcar and trailer-on-flatcar trains for CSX Intermodal. In 1995, the NYS&W turned a profit of $1.6 million. However, in 1996 the NYS&W experienced a $1 million loss following that year's blizzard and a further decline in intermodal traffic.

In 1994, Onondaga County, New York purchased Conrail's former DL&W trackage between Jamesville and Syracuse, with the provision that the NYS&W provide shuttle commuter service between Syracuse University, Armory Square, and the Carousel Mall. Further routes were considered but not implemented. The NYS&W utilized $7 million in state grants and loans, and initiated a rehabilitation of the route to raise its speed restriction. A new intermodal interchange with Conrail was also built at Syracuse. The shuttle commuter provision became OnTrack, which the NYS&W operated in exchange for property tax relief on the route. Three former New Haven Rail Diesel Cars were acquired and restored for the service. With OnTrack, the NYS&W operated their first commercial passenger trains since 1966.

In May 1995, DO obtained another subsidiary: the Illinois-based Toledo, Peoria and Western Railway (TP&W). This railroad began assisting the NYS&W's intermodal interchanges with western U.S. railroads by providing a bypass route around Chicago.

=== Conrail split and management buyout ===
Throughout the 1990s, Norfolk Southern negotiated merging with Conrail, with DO and CSX both fearing the merger would affect their freight operations. DO made an offer to outright purchase Conrail's Southern Tier Line, along with their Meadville Line between Hornell and Youngstown, Ohio, but was swiftly rejected. DO and CSX then secretly financed a regional development authority's purchase of the Meadville Line, to prevent Conrail from ripping it up.

The NS-Conrail merger subsequently fell through, but in October 1996, CSX unexpectedly announced their plans to merge with Conrail. Following some subsequent disputes by NS, it was announced in April 1997 that the Surface Transportation Board (STB) would authorize Conrail to be split between NS and CSX. Since NS and CSX would both receive direct routes into the New York City area, the NYS&W would lose all of their intermodal operations, which by that time, provided 70% of the railway's annual income. Walter Rich quickly mulled his options to satisfy his fellow DO stockholders.

One option was to carry out their proposed "Northeast Network" alliance with the Canadian National Railway (CN), where the NYS&W would have provided a New York City connection for CN, and the two railways would have jointly purchased Conrail's Montreal Line, while the NYS&W would have either purchased Conrail's Southern Tier Line or extended their trackage rights to a Conrail-CN interchange at Buffalo. DO's stockholders were looking into selling their DO shares to secure the corporation's future, and they contacted fourteen parties for a buyout. Only NS and CSX expressed interest. In June 1997, Walter Rich, along with DO Vice-President C. David Soule, negotiated with both railroads. Rich, CSX chairman and CEO John Snow, and NS executive David R. Goode arranged a transaction between their three companies.

On August 17, a new privately held holding company, DO Acquisition LLC, completed their $55 million purchase of Delaware Otsego via a stock tender offer of $22 per share. The purchase brought the NYS&W under control of DO Acquisition LLC, with Walter Rich obtaining 16% of DO's shares, while Norfolk Southern and CSX collectively received 84%, along with the right of first refusal to purchase the Susquehanna, if Rich chose to sell it.

The transaction was completed on October 3, and the NYS&W's Northeast Network alliance plan with CN was quickly dropped. In 1999, the Conrail split between NS and CSX was finalized, and they began to operate intermodal trains out of New Jersey on their own. The NYS&W's final intermodal train operated on February 3, 2001, after their intermodal contracts expired.

=== Post-Conrail activity ===
The NYS&W reoriented their freight operations to solely serve their industrial customers, but Rich explored other opportunities for the railway to gain additional profits. Following the Conrail split, CSX and NS both experienced overflowing freight traffic on their new routes, so the NYS&W allowed CSX to use their trackage as a detour for their River Line trains, and they allowed NS to use their Southern Division as a relief route to prevent their Southern Tier trains from conflicting with NJ Transit's commuter operations.

Concurrently, NJ Transit negotiated with the NYS&W to provide commuter service in the Southern Division between Hawthorne and Sparta, to alleviate roadway congestion on Route 23. The proposal was postponed, when a suitable location for an NJ Transit storage yard around Sparta could not be agreed upon. In 2005, the NYS&W leased the section of the Southern Tier Line from Port Jervis to Binghamton from Norfolk Southern under the Central New York Railroad (CNYK) name,^{[d]} whose charter was reactivated as a paper railroad. All operations and maintenance of the route would be performed by NYS&W personnel, while NS retained overhead trackage rights.

In 2006, NYS&W's Utica branch experienced major storm damage, with some sections of track in Chenango County being washed out. The branch was consequently removed from service, and the NYS&W began to rely on CSX's connection in Utica to serve their customers on the isolated section of the branch between Utica and Sangerfield.

On August 9, 2007, Walter Rich died of pancreatic cancer at the age of 61. The CSX and NS bought the remaining ownership of the NYS&W from Walter Rich's estate, bringing ownership to a roughly 50-50 split with neither corporation having a controlling stake. Nathan Fenno succeeded Rich as president of the NYS&W, and he ordered all passenger operations discontinued, including the cost-prohibitive OnTrack service. The railway's remaining passenger equipment was subsequently sold off, along with many older diesel locomotives.

In July 2011, NYS&W obtained ownership of five leased CEFX locomotives to aid their increasing power shortage. The five locomotives were used to supplement the railway's fleet in mainline service and occasional local freight service.

That same year, a project to rehabilitate the Utica branch began by the Chenango County Industrial Development Agency. Funding was provided by the agency, Chenango County, the New York State Department of Transportation, and the federal Economic Development Administration. By May 2017, the project was completed, and service on the Utica branch was resumed. Service was again discontinued in 2018, and the 60 miles from Chenango Forks to Sangerfield is currently out-of-service with no customers and no prospects. In 2025, Open Space Institute officially proposed to purchase and convert the right of way into a rail trail.

The project to reactivate commuter services along the right of way from Hawthorne to Hackensack remained in the planning stages through the 2010s. Throughout the decade, the project was promoted via social networking blogs and Facebook, resulting in Kinnelon officials publicly voicing support for it. In October 2015, U.S. Congressman Bill Pascrell joined state legislators in creating a coalition to revive NJ Transit's proposed Hawthorne-Sparta commuter service over the NYS&W. In January 2016, the local governments of the involved municipalities passed concurrent resolutions to restart the project.The Passaic–Bergen–Hudson Transit Project was not included in NJ Transit's 2020 ten-year capital plan.

In 2021, the NYS&W formally abandoned their Lodi and Passaic branches, dating from 1896 and 1885 respectively. Both were ripped up in 2025.

In July 2024, James Bonner succeeded Nathan Fenno as president of the NYS&W. Bonner previously served in the same capacity for the New York and Atlantic Railway on Long Island.

== Modern Operations ==
As of 2026, the NYS&W operates over 400 miles (640 km) of trackage in New Jersey, New York, and Pennsylvania and services over 60 customers. With the exception of occasional bridge traffic for the Middletown and New Jersey Railroad (M&NJ), all of the annual carloads generated or destined for the NYS&W are for online customers. Commodities are diverse and include Asphalt, Construction Waste, Food Oils, Frack Sand, Plastics, Lumber Products, Aggregates, Paper Products, Sugar, and Propane.

Northern Division (Binghamton to Syracuse and Utica)
| Terminal | Job | Description |
|---|---|---|
| Utica, NY | UT-1 | Utica Local, Sangerfield Turn |
| Cortland, NY | CL-1 | Cortland Local |
| | CL-2 | Cortland - Syracuse Turn Job (CSXT Interchange) |
| | CL-3 | Cortland - Binghamton Turn Job (NS Interchange) |
| Binghamton, NY | BH-1 | Binghamton Local |

Southern Division (North Bergen to Warwick, NY)
| Terminal | Job | Description |
|---|---|---|
| Ridgefield Park, NJ | WS-1 | CSXT Little Ferry Interchange, Yard Switching |
| | WS-2 | Little Ferry West - Saddle Brook to Butler |
| | WS-3 | Little Ferry East - NS Interchange at Marion |
| | WS-X | Little Ferry West - Sparta |
| | WSP-X | Symbol for Operation Toy Train, Ridgefield Park - Warwick |
| Sparta, NJ | SJ-1 | Sparta Local |

A nocturnal, twice weekly haulage train, the SU-100, runs 250 miles from Binghamton to Ridgefield Park, New Jersey, carrying Syracuse (CSXT) and Binghamton (NS) interchange traffic destined for New Jersey customers. This train would work customers along the CNYK Division including the interchange with the Stourbridge Line at Lackawaxen, Pennsylvania. The crew would lay over in NJ and return to Binghamton the next evening as the SU-99.

As this train runs over a portion of Metro North's Port Jervis Line from Hudson Junction to Sparrow Bush, New York, these trains are required to operate with Positive Train Control. The SU-100/SU-99 also traverses the Hudson Secondary from Warwick to Hudson Junction near Campbell Hall under a trackage rights agreement with the Norfolk Southern, though the operation is currently leased to the M&NJ.

== Excursion operations ==
Under Delaware Otsego management, the Susquehanna began to operate public excursion trains, with the first one taking place in October 1981 for the Jersey Central Chapter of the National Railway Historical Society (NRHS). In 1982, DO purchased a fleet of dome cars from the bankrupt Auto-Train Corporation and began to use them for additional excursion trains on the NYS&W's Northern Division. Passenger ridership on the trains barely broke even. Thus in 1985, the excursion services were reduced and most of the dome cars were sold to fund the rehabilitation of the NYS&W's Butler-Sparta route. There was subsequently a hiatus of excursion operations until July 1988, when the NYS&W hosted some additional trains as part of that year's NRHS Convention.

In 1989, during their temporary takeover of the D&H, the NYS&W was contracted by Steamtown National Historic Site and the Lackawanna County Rail Authority to operate their steam-powered excursion trains over the D&H between Scranton and Kingsley, Pennsylvania, while their line to Moscow was under repairs. The NYS&W subsequently decided to host their own steam excursion program, taking inspiration from similar programs hosted by Norfolk Southern and Union Pacific (UP). They originally planned to restore and operate Southern Railway 385 and United States Army 4039, both of which previously operated on the defunct Morris County Central tourist railroad. Those plans fell through after it was determined the restoration of both locomotives would be too costly.

In June 1990, the NYS&W decided to import a new steam locomotive from China, taking inspiration from the SY-class Nos. 1647 and 1658 on the Connecticut Valley (VALE) and Knox and Kane (K&K) railroads respectively. The railway contracted the Tangshan Locomotive and Rolling Stock Works to construct a modified copy of the SY class, and its boiler design was altered to abide with the American Society of Mechanical Engineers (ASME) boiler code and Federal Railroad Administration (FRA) regulations. The new locomotive, numbered SY-1698M, was planned to be numbered NYS&W No. 141. Following several months of shipping delays, the locomotive was loaded on board the Norwegian vessel Braut Team, and began its voyage to the U.S. in May 1991. The following month, on June 7, Braut Team sunk at the Bay of Bengal after its hull sprung a leak, and SY-1698M was lost.

The NYS&W subsequently explored multiple steam locomotives to acquire and replace their lost SY. In November that same year, two operable steam locomotives became available for purchase; No. 1647 by the VALE and Canadian National 6060 by the Canadian government of Alberta. The NYS&W began negotiating with both parties to purchase their locomotives, but the group that operated No. 6060 at the time protested to keep the locomotive from leaving Canada, and the Alberta government subsequently began to reconsider the locomotive's future. The Susquehanna believed the reconsideration would be a long process, so they dropped their negotiations with them, and by December 2 finalized their purchase of No. 1647 from the VALE.

After being repainted as NYS&W No. 142 and reclassified as an N-4, the locomotive began hauling multiple excursions on the Susquehanna. In 1997, the Susquehanna quietly diminished their excursion program to lower their operating costs, and the Susquehanna Technical and Historical Society gained the rights to operate No. 142-led excursions for occasional events. In 2003, the NYS&W sold No. 142 to the historical society, following a major increase in insurance premium prices. Since 2004, No. 142 resides at the Belvidere and Delaware River Railway (Bel-Del). Following the death of Walter Rich in 2007, all excursions on the Susquehanna were put to an end.

Since 2009, the NYS&W has hosted Operation Toy Train's annual Toys for Tots train from Rochelle Park to Warwick, routinely collecting over 20,000 toys/year. In 2025, operations were expanded to include the Northern Division from Syracuse to Binghamton and the CNYK from Binghamton to Port Jervis

== Connections with other railroads ==
- The railroad has connections with two Class I railroads:
1. CSX Transportation - Syracuse, New York; Utica, New York; North Bergen, New Jersey
2. Norfolk Southern Railway - Binghamton, New York, Marion Junction (New Jersey) and the Passaic Junction (rail yard) rail yard in Saddle Brook, New Jersey
- The railroad has connections with five other railroads:
1. Morristown and Erie Railway and New Jersey Transit - Passaic Junction (rail yard), Saddle Brook, New Jersey
2. Middletown and New Jersey Railroad - Warwick, New York
3. Finger Lakes Railway - Syracuse, New York
4. Mohawk, Adirondack and Northern Railroad (MHWA) - Utica, New York
5. Stourbridge Railroad - Lackawaxen, Pennsylvania

== Stations ==
| State | Location | Station | Miles (km) | Date opened | Date closed | Notes |
|---|---|---|---|---|---|---|
| NJ | Jersey City | Pavonia Terminal | 0.0 miles (0 km) | December 1, 1911 | December 12, 1958 | Until December 1, 1911, the railroad used the Pennsylvania Railroad's Exchange Place Terminal. |
| NJ | North Bergen | Tyler Park | 4.5 miles (7.2 km) | | | Eliminated by 1908. The station shared service with the Erie Railroad Northern Branch. |
| NJ | North Bergen | Susquehanna Transfer | | August 1, 1939 | June 30, 1966 | From December 13, 1958 – June 30, 1966, Susquehanna Transfer served as the southern terminus of the railroad. The station shared service with the Erie Railroad Northern Branch. |
| NJ | North Bergen | North Bergen | 6.0 miles (9.7 km) | | June 30, 1966 | Shared service with the Erie Railroad Northern Branch |
| NJ | North Bergen | New Durham | 6.9 miles (11.1 km) | March 11, 1872 | June 30, 1966 | Shared service with the Erie Railroad Northern Branch |
| NJ | North Bergen | Northern Branch forks off at Granton Junction | | | | |
| NJ | North Bergen | Babbitt | 8.5 miles (13.7 km) | | June 30, 1966 | |
| NJ | Ridgefield Park | Little Ferry | 11.1 miles (17.9 km) | | June 30, 1966 | Name of station (and associated freight yard) derived from Little Ferry, the ferry service that formerly operated across the Hackensack River here; the municipality of Little Ferry on the other side of the river was also named for the ferry service. |
| NJ | Ridgefield Park | Ridgefield Park | 11.8 miles (19.0 km) | March 11, 1872 | June 30, 1966 | Station co-served with the West Shore Railroad of the New York Central Railroad until they discontinued passenger service on December 10, 1959. The original wooden passenger station was replaced by an ornate brick structure that opened on August 20, 1927. |
| NJ | Bogota | Bogota | 13.2 miles (21.2 km) | March 11, 1872 | June 30, 1966 | |
| NJ | Hackensack | Hackensack | 13.9 miles (22.4 km) | March 11, 1872 | June 30, 1966 | |
| NJ | Hackensack | Prospect Avenue | 14.6 miles (23.5 km) | | June 30, 1966 | |
| NJ | Hackensack | Lodi Branch forked off west of Prospect Avenue | | | | |
| NJ | Maywood | Maywood | 15.3 miles (24.6 km) | March 11, 1872 | June 30, 1966 | |
| NJ | Rochelle Park | Rochelle Park | 16.1 miles (25.9 km) | | June 30, 1966 | |
| NJ | Saddle Brook | Passaic Junction | 17.4 miles (28.0 km) | | | |
| NJ | Saddle Brook | Passaic Branch forked off at Passaic Junction | | | | |
| NJ | East Paterson | East Paterson | 18.6 miles (29.9 km) | March 11, 1872 | June 30, 1966 | The station was known as Dundee Lake until October 1928, 12 years after the borough changed names to East Paterson. Damaged in a fire on October 13, 1969, the railroad demolished the station soon after. East Paterson changed its name to Elmwood Park on January 1, 1973. |
| NJ | Paterson | Vreeland Avenue | 19.3 miles (31.1 km) | | June 30, 1966 | The railroad demolished the original wooden Vreeland Avenue station in 1949 and replaced it with a brick structure that opened in September. |
| NJ | Paterson | Broadway-Paterson | 20.5 miles (33.0 km) | March 11, 1872 | June 30, 1966 | The station served as junction to the Paterson City Branch, which discontinued service on January 8, 1960. The station, abandoned for 12 years, burned on June 24, 1978. |
| NJ | Paterson | Paterson City Branch forked off to Paterson City station. | | | | |
| NJ | Paterson | Riverside | 21.9 miles (35.2 km) | March 11, 1872 | June 30, 1966 | |
| NJ | Hawthorne | Hawthorne | 22.8 miles (36.7 km) | March 11, 1872 | June 30, 1966 | |
| NJ | Hawthorne | North Hawthorne | 23.4 miles (37.7 km) | March 11, 1872 | June 30, 1966 | The station at North Hawthorne was first known as Van Winkles, named after a local family who donated the land for the new station and railway. Despite protests from the family, the Susquehanna moved the station to its modern location on May 24, 1891, when the railroad changed the name to North Paterson. The name changed again in 1923 to North Hawthorne. |
| NJ | Midland Park | Midland Park | 25.2 miles (40.6 km) | March 11, 1872 | June 30, 1966 | Midland Park station burned on August 28, 1985, while serving as a furniture stripping company building. |
| NJ | Midland Park | Wortendyke | 26.5 miles (42.6 km) | March 11, 1872 | June 30, 1966 | Wortendyke served as the home of the car repair shops until a fire on December 27, 1891. The shops were not rebuilt at Wortendyke, but moved to North Paterson station in 1892. |
| NJ | Wyckoff | Wyckoff | 28.0 miles (45.1 km) | March 11, 1872 | June 30, 1966 | |
| NJ | Franklin Lakes | Campgaw | 29.7 miles (47.8 km) | March 11, 1872 | June 30, 1966 | |
| NJ | Franklin Lakes | Crystal Lake | 30.7 miles (49.4 km) | March 11, 1872 | | |
| NJ | Oakland | Oakland | 32.0 miles (51.5 km) | March 11, 1872 | June 30, 1966 | Oakland station came down on November 25, 1957, to be replaced by a post office that included a small area for a railroad office. |
| NJ | Oakland | West Oakland | | | | |
| NJ | Pompton Lakes | Pompton Lakes | 35.0 miles (56.3 km) | March 11, 1872 | June 30, 1966 | |
| NJ | Pompton Lakes | Pompton Junction | 35.6 miles (57.3 km) | January 1, 1873 | | This station marked a junction with the Erie Railroad's New York and Greenwood Lake Railway. The abandoned station burned to the ground on May 8, 1941. |
| NJ | Riverdale | Bloomingdale | 36.8 miles (59.2 km) | March 11, 1872 | | Despite being named after the borough of Bloomingdale, the station was actually in nearby Riverdale. |
| NJ | Butler | Butler | 38.0 miles (61.2 km) | March 11, 1872 | June 30, 1966 | Formerly known as West Bloomingdale, Butler served as the northern terminus of commuter passenger service until its discontinuation on June 30, 1966. |
| NJ | West Milford | Smiths Mills | 39 miles (63 km) | March 11, 1872 | | |
| NJ | West Milford | Wharton and Northern Railroad merges with the railroad at Green Pond Junction | | | | |
| NJ | West Milford | Charlotteburgh | 43.4 miles (69.8 km) | March 11, 1872 August 7, 1942 | March 21, 1941 September 1944 | |
| NJ | West Milford | Macopin Lake Branch forks off at Macopin Lake Junction | | | | |
| NJ | West Milford | Newfoundland | 45.1 miles (72.6 km) | March 11, 1872 August 7, 1942 | March 21, 1941 September 1944 | |
| NJ | West Milford | Oak Ridge | 47.0 miles (75.6 km) | August 7, 1942 | March 21, 1941 September 1944 | |
| NJ | Hardyston Township | Stockholm | 50.4 miles (81.1 km) | August 7, 1942 | March 21, 1941 September 1944 | |
| NJ | Hardyston Township | Beaver Lake | 53.9 miles (86.7 km) | August 7, 1942 | March 21, 1941 September 1944 | |
| NJ | Hardyston Township | Hanford Branch forked off at Beaver Lake station | | | | |
| NJ | Ogdensburg | South Ogdensburg | 57 miles (92 km) | | | |
| NJ | Sparta | Sparta | 60.2 miles (96.9 km) | | | Sparta station burned in an early morning fire on September 3, 2012. |
| NJ | Sparta | Sparta Junction | 63.1 miles (101.5 km) | | | |
| NJ | Lafayette Township | Hyper-Humus | 65.9 miles (106.1 km) | | | Junction with the Delaware, Lackawanna and Western Railroad's Sussex Branch |
| NJ | Hampton Township | Halsey | 68.4 miles (110.1 km) | | | |
| NJ | Hampton Township | Swartswood | 71.3 miles (114.7 km) | | | |
| NJ | Stillwater Township | Emmaus | | | | |
| NJ | Stillwater Township | Stillwater | 75.3 miles (121.2 km) | | | |
| NJ | Frelinghuysen Township | Paulina | | | | |
| NJ | Frelinghuysen Township | Marksboro | 79.8 miles (128.4 km) | | | |
| NJ | Blairstown | Blairstown | 82.9 miles (133.4 km) | | | |
| NJ | Blairstown | Kalarama | 84.7 miles (136.3 km) | | | Citing low sales, the station at Kalarama was to be moved to Vails in a similar fashion to North Hawthorne. The station fell off the rail platform it had been moved to, tumbled down an embankment, and fell apart. |
| NJ | Blairstown | Vail | 86.5 miles (139.2 km) | | | |
| NJ | Knowlton Township | Hainesburg | 89.1 miles (143.4 km) | | | |
| NJ | Knowlton Township | Hainesburg Junction | 89.4 miles (143.9 km) | | | |
| NJ | Knowlton Township | Warrington | 91 miles (146 km) | | | |
| NJ | Knowlton Township | Delaware Branch forked off after Warrington station | | | | |
| NJ | Knowlton Township | Columbia | 91.7 miles (147.6 km) | | | |
| NJ | Pahaquarry Township | Howeys | | | | Howeys station was a summer flag stop east of Dunnfield. |
| NJ | Pahaquarry Township | Dunnfield | 95.3 miles (153.4 km) | | February 16, 1941 | |
Delaware River
| PA | Smithfield Township | Water Gap | 97.9 miles (157.6 km) | | February 16, 1941 | |
| PA | Stroudsburg | Stroudsburg | 101.2 miles (162.9 km) | | February 16, 1941 | |
| PA | Stroudsburg | Wilkes-Barre and Eastern Railroad forked off west of Stroudsburg | | | | |
| PA | Stroudsburg | Gravel Place | 103.6 miles (166.7 km) | | February 16, 1941 | Western terminus of NYS&W |

== Equipment ==
=== Locomotive roster ===
| Number | Image | Builder | Model | Powertrain |
|---|---|---|---|---|
| 3010, 3014 | | EMD | SD40T-2 | Diesel–electric |
| 3012, 3016 | | EMD | SD33ECO | Diesel–electric |
| 3018, 3022, 3024 | | EMD | SD40-2 | Diesel–electric |
| 3040 | | EMD | GP40 | Diesel–electric |
| 3618, 3634 | | EMD | SD45-2 | Diesel–electric |
| 4060, 4062, 4064, 4066 | | EMD | SD70M-2 | Diesel–electric |

=== Former locomotives ===
Locomotive details
| Number | Image | Builder | Model | Powertrain |
|---|---|---|---|---|
| M-1, M-2, M-3, M-4, M-5, M-6, M-7, M-8 | | Budd Company | RDC1 | Diesel–hydraulic |
| 100 | N/A | Buda Engine Co. | Streamlined Inspection car | Gas-mechanical |
| 101, 104 | | American Locomotive Company | RS-3 | Diesel–electric |
| 116 | N/A | Electro-Motive Diesel | NW-2 | Diesel–electric |
| 120 | N/A | Electro-Motive Diesel | SW-9 | Diesel–electric |
| 142 | | Tangshan Locomotive and Rolling Stock Works | SY 2-8-2 | Steam |
| 150, 151 | | Geo D. Whitcomb Company | 20T | Gas-mechanical |
| 200 | N/A | GE Transportation | 45-tonner | Diesel–electric |
| 202, 203, 204, 205, 206, 208 | | American Locomotive Company | S2 | Diesel–electric |
| 230, 231 (2), 232, 233 (2), 234, 236, 238, 240, 242, 244, 246, 248, 250, 252, 254, 256 | | American Locomotive Company | RS-1 | Diesel–electric |
| 1001, 1002, 1003-1004, 1005-1006 | | American Car and Foundry Company | Motorailer | Diesel-mechanical Hesselman engine |
| 1800, 1802, 1804 | N/A | Electro-Motive Diesel | GP18 | Diesel–electric |
| 2000, 2002 (later 260) | N/A | American Locomotive Company | C420 | Diesel–electric |
| 2400, 2402 | | E9 | | Diesel–electric |
| 3000, 3002, 3004, 3006, 3008 | | American Locomotive Company | C430 | Diesel–electric |
| 3001 | | J. G. Brill | Model 250 | Gas– electric |
| 3002 | N/A | J. G. Brill | | Gas– electric |
| 3636, 3638 (formerly 6640, 6370) | N/A | Electro-Motive Diesel | F45 | Diesel–electric |
| 4002 - 4048 evens | | GE | Dash 8-40B | Diesel–electric |
| 4050, 4052, 4054 | N/A | Electro-Motive Diesel | SD70M | Diesel–electric |
| 5012 | N/A | Electro-Motive/Bethlehem Steel | Stillwell baggage coach motorcar | Gas– electric |
| 6360, 6361 (later 3626), 6362 (later 3612), 6364 (later 3614), 6366, 6503 (later 3620), 6509 (later 3622), 6513 (later 3624), 6515, 6521 (later 3630), 6525 (later 3632), 6542 (later 3634) | N/A | EMD | SD45 | Diesel–electric |
| 3660 | | American Locomotive Company | C636 | Diesel–electric |
| 3664, 3666, 3668, 3670, 3672, 3674 | N/A | Montreal Locomotive Works | M636 | Diesel–electric |
| 3800, 3802, 3804, 3806, 3808, 3810 | N/A | Electro-Motive Diesel | SD60 | Diesel–electric |

== Notes ==
- ^{a} Culminating with the sale of their coal dumper to the Reading Railroad.
- ^{b} In reality it would retain steam power for yard switching duties until 1946 or 1947, as well as leasing steam locomotives from the Delaware and Hudson Railroad during locomotive shortages post-World War II.
- ^{c} In 1867 the NJH&D would perform some minimal grading in Butler and Bloomingdale to preserve its charter by at least doing some work
- ^{d} Delaware Otsego used the Central New York Railroad charter and name twice: The first was the short line near Utica from 1973-1988. The second would be the paper railroad operating over the Southern Tier line to join the Northern and Southern divisions, beginning in 2005

== See also ==
- Delaware Otsego Corporation - Parent company for NYS&W
- Hawthorne station (New York, Susquehanna and Western Railroad)
- Maywood Station Museum
- Susquehanna Transfer station

== Bibliography ==
- Ashley, Wallace W. (July 1946). "Susquehanna". Trains. Vol. 6, no. 9. pp. 10–23. ISSN 0041-0934.
- Drury, George H. (1992). The Train-Watcher's Guide to North American Railroads: A Contemporary Reference to the Major railroads of the U.S., Canada and Mexico. Waukesha, Wisconsin: Kalmbach Publishing. ISBN 978-0-89024-131-8.
- Drury, George H. (1994). The Historical Guide to North American Railroads: Histories, Figures, and Features of more than 160 Railroads Abandoned or Merged since 1930. Waukesha, Wisconsin: Kalmbach Media. ISBN 978-0-89024-072-4.
- Hartley, Scott (January 1988). "Regionals In Review - The Delaware Otsego Story". Trains. Vol. 48, no. 3. Kalmbach Publishing. pp. 28–41. ISSN 0041-0934.
- Interstate Commerce Commission (1931). Interstate Commerce Commission Reports: Decisions of the Interstate Commerce Commission of the United States. Valuation reports. Vol. 33. Washington, D.C.: U.S. Government Printing Office.
- Kaminski, Edward S. (2010). Maywood - The Borough, The Station, and The Railroad. Acadia Publishing. ISBN 978-0-7385-7234-5.
- Karlewicz, Ken; Hartley, Scott (1987). Susquehanna: From Shortlines to Stack packs. Piscataway, New Jersey: Railpace Company, Inc. LCCN 87020698.
- Krause, John; Crist, Ed (1991). Susquehanna: New York Susquehanna & Western RR. Carstens Publications. ISBN 978-0-911868-38-8.
- Lucas, Walter Arndt (1980) [1939]. The History of the New York, Susquehanna and Western Railroad (second ed.). Railroadians of America. LCCN 82163920.
- Martin, Ben (November 2001). "The Changing of the Guard". Railfan & Railroad. Vol. 20, no. 11. Carstens Publications. pp. 6–9.
- Mohowski, Robert E. (2003). The New York Susquehanna and Western Railroad. Baltimore: Johns Hopkins University Press. ISBN 978-0-8018-7222-8.
- Schmitt, James C. (2009). Historic Rails of the New York, Susquehanna & Western Railroad. West Milford, New Jersey: Tinfoil Rose Design, LLC. ISBN 9780615313849.
- Stephens, Bill (January 1998). "The Susie-Q Saga". Trains. Vol. 58, no. 1. Kalmbach Publishing. pp. 42–47. ISSN 0041-0934. Archived from the original on October 2, 2024.
- Tupaczewski, Paul R. (2002). New York, Susquehanna and Western In Color. Scotch Plains, New Jersey: Morning Sun Books, Inc. ISBN 978-1-58248-070-1.
- Zullig, Walter E. Jr.; Holtz, Albert T. (2009). Susquehanna Trackside 1954-1968. Scotch Plains, New Jersey: Morning Sun Books, Inc. ISBN 978-1-58248-410-5.
- Boyd, Jim (May 1987). "Stack Trains on the Susquehanna". Railfan & Railroad. Vol. 6, no. 9. Carstens Publications.
