= History of the Staten Island Railway (1900–1970) =

The following outlines the history of the Staten Island Railway from 1900 to 1970. The Staten Island Railway (SIR), a rapid transit line in the New York City borough of Staten Island, was affiliated with the Baltimore & Ohio Railroad (B&O), which was taken over by the Pennsylvania Railroad (PRR) in 1900. The PRR conducted several improvements after taking over. In anticipation of a tunnel under the Narrows to Brooklyn and a connection there with the New York City Subway, the SIRT electrified its lines in 1925. Electrification did not greatly increase traffic, and the tunnel was never built. During the 1920s, a branch line along Staten Island's West Shore was built to haul building materials for the Outerbridge Crossing; the branch was cut back to a point south of the crossing after the bridge was built. The Gulf Oil Corporation opened a dock and tank farm along Arthur Kill in 1928; to serve it, the Travis Branch was built south from Arlington Yard into the marshes of the island's western shore to Gulfport in the early 1930s.

The Port Richmond–Tower Hill viaduct, the United States' largest grade-crossing-elimination project, was completed on February 25, 1937, elevating the SIRT's North Shore Branch above the street. Freight and World War II traffic helped pay some of the SIRT's accumulated debt, and the line was briefly profitable in the 1940s. The St. George Terminal was rebuilt between 1946 and 1951 following a major fire, Meanwhile, declining ridership led to abandonment of the North Shore Branch and the South Beach Branch in 1953; the South Beach Branch was abandoned shortly afterwards, and the North Shore Branch continued to carry freight. The main line, from St. George to Tottenville, was the only line to remain in passenger service. In 1956, work began on the replacement of the Arthur Kill swing bridge by a single-track, 558-foot (170 m) vertical-lift bridge, which opened in 1959. The Travis Branch was extended in 1958 to a new Consolidated Edison power plant in Travis (on the West Shore). Operation of the Tottenville line was turned over to the Staten Island Rapid Transit Operating Authority (a division of the state's Metropolitan Transportation Authority) on July 1, 1971, and the line was purchased by the city of New York. As part of the agreement, freight on the line would continue to be handled by the B&O under the Staten Island Railroad. The first six R44 cars (the same as the newest cars then in use on the subway lines in the other boroughs) were put into SIRT service on February 28, 1973, replacing the ME-1 cars which had been in service since 1925. Between 1971 and 1973, a project began to extend the high-level platforms at six stations. A station-rebuilding program began in 1985, and the line's R44s were overhauled starting in 1987.

== Modernization: 1900–1949 ==
=== Pennsylvania Railroad control: 1900–1913 ===
==== Pennsylvania acquisition ====
The SIRT had been affiliated with the Baltimore & Ohio Railroad (B&O) since 1880. Improvements were made to the SIRT after the Pennsylvania Railroad (PRR) under the leadership of president Alexander Cassatt took control of the B&O. Cassatt was named president of the PRR in 1899, and he allied with the New York Central Railroad for a "community of interest" plan. Cassatt wanted to end the rebate practice being undertaken by Standard Oil and Carnegie Steel—both larger shippers—that kept the freight rates extremely low. To achieve this, the two railroads bought stock in smaller, weaker trunk line railroads. The New York Central bought stock in the Reading Company, while the PRR bought stock in the Chesapeake and Ohio Railway, the Norfolk Southern Railway, and in the B&O—including the SIRT and the ferries on Staten Island. The plan worked; the average freight rate for the two companies rose. Cassatt first purchased B&O stock in 1899, most of it being under PRR control by 1901. After the PRR took more direct control of the B&O, including the SIRT; in May 1901, improvements were made to the rail line. PRR control of the line decreased as a new PRR president had different priorities, and in 1906, the PRR sold half of its B&O stock to the Union Pacific Railroad. The remainder of the PRR's stock in the B&O was sold to the Union Pacific in 1913.

==== Improvements ====
Under PRR control, the B&O was profitable again and became a stronger railroad. The PRR allowed the B&O's newly developed properties to remain intact. On October 13, 1902, the SIRT started a trial passenger service from Plainfield station in New Jersey to St. George, running via the Jersey Central past Cranford Junction. The SIRT operated four trains every day, except for Sunday, with direct connections with the B&O's Royal Blue service between New York City and Washington, D.C. at Plainfield. These trains consisted of a locomotive and two passenger coaches. While this service was in operation the B&O sold tickets for its main line trains at the railroad's ferry terminals in Brooklyn, at South Ferry, and at St. George. Four passengers alighted at Plainfield on the first trip. On November 3, 1902, it was announced that a complete schedule would be arranged to Plainfield, to take effect on November 22, 1902. The service was discontinued in 1903 because it was unprofitable. The PRR bought four large double-decker steamers to halve the travel time on the Staten Island Ferry. Even though the PRR improved ferry service, the B&O was ejected from the Whitehall Street terminal on October 25, 1905, when the city took ownership of the ferry and terminals. The city built a new St. George Terminal for $2,318,720.

In September 1906, the Jersey Central purchased 20 feet (6.1 m) of property on the north side of its track between Plainfield and Cranford to enable to construct a fifth track to accommodate B&O freight trains to Staten Island, of which several traveled westbound from Cranford Junction between 6 p.m. and 8 p.m.. The track was intended to allow freight traffic, which often had to wait at Cranford Junction for multiple hours to make way for local passenger trains that were using the freight track to stay out of the way of express trains, to keep moving.

The PRR increased the number of daily trips to 28, and in 1902, it began contemplating the electrification of the rail line. The PRR's investment in the southern portion of the Perth Amboy sub-division was credited for the increased development of the South Shore of Staten Island. As such, in about 1902, a new station was constructed at Whitlock to serve a new community being built by the Whitlock Realty Company on the South Shore. The development company incentivized prospective buyers to bid on newly built houses by promising a year's free commuting between Manhattan and Whitlock for the first 25 houses. In December 1912, the SIRT petitioned the Public Service Commission (PSC) to allow the railway to abandon the station and replace it with a station named Bay Terrace 1,594 feet (486 m) to the south. The change was made, anticipating a shift in the center of population in the community. A hearing to hear the application was held by the PSC on December 18.

On February 21, 1907, the Staten Island Railway petitioned the Public Service Commission (PSC) to get permission to move the Dongan Hills stop from its location south of Seaview Avenue to a location 100 feet (30 m) to the north in between Seaview Avenue and Garretson Avenue. On March 12, 1907, the PSC granted its permission.

In September 1909, the New York State Public Service Commission (PSC) allowed the B&O to acquire 227 shares of the Staten Island Railway's capital stock, giving the B&O all of the railway's stock except for the few shares that had to be held by officers. Practically all of the Staten Island Railway's stock had been purchased by the B&O by 1906.

After 1900, several new houses were built in the community of Annadale and several parts of the Little Farms development. In 1910, as part of the development, the building company built a new railroad station. As a result, on March 22, 1910, the SIRT petitioned the PSC to allow it to discontinue its service at Annadale station and replace it with a new station of the same name 450 feet (140 m) to the west. On November 18, 1910, trains started stopping at a new station at Annadale that was built by the Wood Harmon Company the previous summer, which was located on the eastbound side of the track. This station replaced the station on the westbound track. As part of the construction of the new station, the operation of the switches where the line narrowed from two tracks to one began to be done from the station instead of being done manually. In addition, in 1910, a new freight house went into operation at Clifton, and new 75 pounds (34 kg) rails were installed as far south as Richmond Valley on the Perth Amboy Division. These new rails, which were 8 pounds (3.6 kg) heavier than the rails already in place on the southern section of the Perth Amboy Division, were expected to reduce the jarring of cars.

The PSC held a public hearing on December 16, 1910, to consider a proposal to eliminate grade crossings at Crook's crossing on Amboy Road in Great Kills, Clove Road in Grasmere, and Amboy Road in Huguenot. Commissioner of Public Work L.L. Tribus and Borough President Cromwell had started the push to eliminate grade crossings in Staten Island, which was approved by officials of the Staten Island Railway. The Board of Estimate had approved an appropriation to create a tentative plan. In the previous session of the State Legislature, a bill was passed allocating $250,000 for the state's portion of a fund to eliminate grade crossings in New York City, of which $200,000 was for Queens and $50,000 was for Staten Island. As such, $100 million would be available for the elimination of grade crossings in the two boroughs. At the time, there were 89 grade crossings on Staten Island, of which 14 were protected by sign boards, 44 by bells, 14 by flagmen, and 17 by gates. 100 people were injured and 56 people were killed in accidents at grade crossings from 1907 to 1910.

On March 6, 1911, work began on the elimination of a grade crossing at Amboy Road in Huguenot, which the PSC had ordered to be eliminated, as it was considered the most dangerous crossing on the island. Work was to be done quickly with the intent of completing the project by the end of summer. As part of the project, Amboy Road would be depressed by 10 to 12 feet (3.0 to 3.7 m), and the tracks would be raised to provide 14 feet (4.3 m) of clearance. The crossing was to be 60 feet (18 m) wide with sidewalks, and the structure over the road was to consist of steel on concrete abutments. The project was estimated to cost $78,240, with $19,560 in funding coming from the state. The PSC had also ordered the elimination of a grade crossing at Great Kills with Crooke's crossing; work on the project was expected to begin shortly.

On March 24, 1911, an automatic block signal system manufactured by the Hall Signal Company was put into use between Pleasant Plains and Tottenville, eliminating the need for a telegraph block signal office at Atlantic station. The new signaling system reduced the work required for telegraph operators on the line to report when trains moved in and out of signal blocks. This system had already been in use on the North Shore Branch from St. George to Arlington, and the South Beach Branch from St. George to South Beach for some time.

In July 1911, the Public Service Commission (PSC) ordered the SIRT to install gates at several grade crossings on the North Shore Division to increase safety and reduce the frequent occurrence of accidents. This followed a PSC order to have flagmen staff the grade crossing at Amboy Road in Huguenot and Crooke's crossing in Great Kills at all times. Bids on projects to eliminate these crossings had been advertised earlier, but no work had yet started on them. There were 42 public grate crossings on the SIRT, and 43 on the SIR, in addition to 34 on private property. The PSC sent inspectors to investigate every crossing in the city with considerable traffic with the goal of eliminating all grade crossings in September 1911. The PSC's goal was to either have the SIRT eliminate all grade crossings or have them install gates at dangerous crossings. Plans for the elimination of the crossings in Huguenot and Great Kills were prepared, and work was expected to begin shortly.

In November 1911, the Public Service Commission gave notice for a hearing on November 23 to consider whether the Staten Island Railway Company and the Staten Island Rapid Transit Railway Company should electrify their lines, and whether any additional terminal facilities, tracks and switches were needed. This issue came up as a result of a complaint made by Reverend Father Charles A. Cassidy about noise from the switching of cars and steam locomotives in the St. George freight yards. In December 1911, the PSC ordered that the Staten Island Railway Company and the Staten Island Rapid Transit Railway Company consider electrifying their lines. A public hearing for this matter was set for January 15, 1912.

On December 12, 1911, following a series of hearings held between October 30 and December 4, the PSC ruled that grade crossings on Staten Island had to be protected. The hearings had been held following a petition made by residents of Prince Bay and Pleasant Plains after two boys were seriously injured when a train struck a stagecoach they were riding at the Sharrott Avenue crossing in Pleasant Plains. The PSC ordered that, as of March 15, 1912, gates had to be placed at Centre Street in Clifton, Seaview Avenue and Garretson Avenue in Dongan Hills, at Rose Avenue in New Dorp, at Giffords Lane in Great Kills, at Huguenot Avenue in Huguenot, at Seguine Avenue (Prince Bay Avenue) in Prince Bay, and at Amboy Road in Pleasant Plains on the Perth Amboy Division. In addition, the SIRT and SIR were required to have signal bells placed at Fisher Avenue in Tottenville, at Old Mill Road in Richmond Valley, Annadale Road in Annadale, and Ocean Avenue in New Dorp on the Perth Amboy Division, and have a flagman placed at each of these crossings from 7 a.m. to 7 p.m.. A flagman also had to be in place at the crossing at Main Street in Tottenville at all times. The PSC also ordered that, as of January 15, 1912, gates had to be installed at Newark Avenue and Morningstar Road in Elm Park, and at Central Avenue in Mariners' Harbor on the North Shore Division, and at Tompkins Avenue in Fort Wadsworth, St. Mary's Avenue, Clifton Avenue, and Pennsylvania Avenue in Rosebank, Maple Avenue in Clifton, and Wave Street and Prospect Street in Stapleton on the South Beach Division. In addition, signal bells had to be installed at Chestnut Avenue in Clifton on the South Beach Division, and Granite Avenue in Elm Park on the North Shore Division.

In May 1912, work began on the installation of the new signaling system between Clifton Junction and Pleasant Plains. In order to allow for the installation of the new signaling, the experimental Lacroix automatic signaling system, which had been installed between Dongan Hills and Grasmere, would be removed.

In August 1912, the New York City Board of Estimate provided notice that it would hold a hearing on September 19 on the Staten Island Railway Company's application to add an additional track between Amboy Road in Pleasant Plains and Huguenot Avenue in Huguenot. In October 1912, work installing the new signaling system on the Perth Amboy Division was complete, with the exception of the single-track segment between Annadale and Pleasant Plains, which had a switch at Huguenot. The remaining section was scheduled to receive the new signaling once the completion of the grade-crossing elimination project in Huguenot and the completion of a second track between Annadale and Pleasant Plains. In October 1912, the Board of Estimate held a hearing on the Staten Island Railway Company's application to double-track its line from Pleasant Plains to Huguenot. A hearing had previously been held on the company's application for Amboy Road in Huguenot by itself. Work on that grade separation project was being completed rapidly, with the concrete abutments for the railroad bridge being almost completed and large steel girders being ready to be put into place. Work to grade the right-of-way for the second track was extended from the Amboy Road grade crossing in Huguenot past Prince Bay station. Work to lay the second track was expected to begin following the passing of the application by the Board of Estimate. With the completion of the double-tracking, trains would no longer have to wait at sidings at Annadale and Pleasant Plains for trains in the opposite direction to proceed.

In November 1912, the Board of Estimate issued a notice for the final hearing on SIRT's application to double-track the Annadale to Pleasant Plains section, which would take place on December 5. No one had spoken in opposition to the plan at the October hearing. The contract between New York City and the Staten Island Railway Company would have the company pay the city $500 three months after the Mayor signed the contract, with a sum of $100 for each crossing the second track would pass over or an annual amount of $800 from the date of the contract's signing until October 28, 1934. The crossings that would be crossed were Woodvale Avenue, Sharrott Avenue and Amboy Road in Pleasant Plains, Bayview Avenue and Manee Avenue in Prince Bay, and Huguenot Avenue and Amboy Road in Huguenot. Work on the elimination of the grade crossing at Amboy Road was in progress, and new girders were being put into place. Work to grade the second track was completed as far south as Prince's Bay station. On December 17, 1912, the State Supreme Court in Brooklyn received an application for the appointment of a commission to assess and appraise the properties needed for the widening of Amboy Road, which would be part of the project to abolish the grade crossing there. It was expected that the road would open around January 1, 1913.

On December 26, 1912, the City of New York granted the SIRT the right to construct a second track between Huguenot and Pleasant Plains, with completion expected in three years. The grant was for 25 years.

On March 25, 1913, work began on the double tracking of the Perth Amboy Division between Huguenot and Prince's Bay. Work was expected to be done to complete the second track from Prince's Bay to Pleasant Plains shortly afterwards. The automatic block signal system would be extended over the new second track. At the same time, work began on eliminating Crookes crossing in Great Kills. Crookes crossing, which was located between Oakwood and Great Kills station, crossed the train tracks on a diagonal with a descending grade from both sides. This was considered the deadliest crossing on Staten Island, especially as car traffic became heavier on Amboy Road. The work to eliminate the crossing would consist of the raising of the grade of Amboy Road above the rail line. Work was expected to be completed before the middle of the summer in 1913.

Work on the grade crossing project at Amboy Road was completed by May 1913 at the cost of $100,000. Amboy Road now passed under the rail line at this point. This was the first grade crossing eliminated on the SIRT. Some time earlier, at a PSC hearing, it was recommended that the SIRT consider eliminating eleven additional grade crossings, with those on the Amboy Division being at Jefferson Blvd in Annadale, at Liberty Avenue in Dongan Hills, and at Clove Road in Grasmere.

On June 18, 1913, trains began running over the new double track between Annadale and Prince's Bay, leaving the section between Prince's Bay and Pleasant Plains as the only single-track section on the Perth Amboy Division. The new double track section, which was about 2 miles (3.2 km) long, reduced train delays, and allowed for the transferring of three shifts of telegraph operators from Annadale to the new tower at Prince's Bay, which controlled the switches at the boundary of double track territory. Another tower was planned to be installed at Pleasant Plains as part of a series of improvements at that station. The passenger station would be moved to the existing freight station, and a new freight station would be constructed on the opposite side of the track. As part of the project, grades were adjusted, and the roadbed was well ballasted and had heavy rail tracks installed, improving its condition to the higher standard that was maintained on the rest of the line. In July 1913, a group of Annadale residents appealed to the PSC for the restoration of the telegraph station at Annadale.

On August 7, 1913, work began on the construction of a new two-story switch tower at the former site of the station at Amboy Road. The tower would automatically control the interlocking being installed between Pleasant Plains and Prince's Bay, and was to be similar to the one that had been installed at Prince's Bay. In September 1913, work was nearly completed on improvements at the Pleasant Plains station, and the tower was on track to be completed in October. The Pleasant Plains station house was completely renovated, and received electric lights on the platform and in the station house. The new station opened on October 8, 1913, and the tower was completed shortly afterwards. On December 18, 1913, trains started using the new elevated structure over Crooks crossing, eliminating another grade crossing.

During fiscal year 1915, a second track was completed between Annadale and Prince's Bay, and grade crossings elimination projects were undertaken at Amboy Road, Huguenot Park, and Pleasant Plains. On January 19, 1917, the Board of Estimate gave notice that they would hold a public hearing on January 26 to hear the application of the Staten Island Railway Company to abandon its right to double track its line between Pleasant Plains and Prince's Bay. When the grade crossings at Huguenot and Great Kills were eliminated, the PSC had notified the SIRC that it should also eliminate the five grade crossings between Pleasant Plains and Prince's Bay, and gave the company three years to do so, which did not happen. They had granted the company an extension of one year to complete the work, but that expired on December 26, 1916. The SIRC said that it had applied for permission to abandon its right to complete the second track as its operation did not require the double tracking of this section, and as it wanted to avoid the expense of eliminating the grade crossings and of double tracking until it was needed.

In August 1917, the PSC adopted an order directing the SIRT and other railways to keep the gates at 33 grade crossings closed between midnight and 5 a.m. for vehicle safety. The New York State Transit Commission, on August 15, 1919, ordered the SIRT to eliminate the grade crossing at Virginia Avenue by lowering that street under the existing rail line, with a clearance of 14 feet (4.3 m). However, due to World War I and issues with nearby grade crossing elimination projects, this work was delayed.

On April 13, 1922, the SIRT petitioned to the PSC to move Bay Terrace station 1,000 feet (300 m) to the east of the station to Kelvan Avenue (Bay Terrace) and to rename the station Rice Manor. The PSC denied the application as the move would allow fewer people to use the station. There were 35 homes immediately surrounding the existing station while there were only three at the proposed location. The move was intended to spur development in the surrounding area.

==== Increase in traffic ====
Revenue passenger traffic, in millions of passenger-miles
| Year | Traffic |
|---|---|
| 1925 | 67 |
| 1944 | 81 |
| 1960 | 37 |
| 1967 | 38 |

In 1890 and 1906, respectively, the car float terminal and freight yard at Saint George and Arlington Yard were opened. The two main freight yards on Staten Island, Arlington and Saint George, were at capacity, and in 1912, to ease the congestion, the B&O began running freight via the Jersey Central into Jersey City. The B&O profited from the heavy coal trade that operated via the lines on Staten Island. In 1920, 4,000,000 tons of freight had been handled on the railway. In addition, passenger traffic on the line increased. Between 1903 and 1920, daily trips on the North Shore Branch increased from 50 to 65; from 50 to 60 on the South Beach Branch; and from 22 to 34 on the Tottenville Branch. In 1920, 8,000,000 passengers used the North Shore and South Beach branches while 5,000,000 passengers used the main line. Up to 1921, 3,369,400 trains had been operated on the SIRT with no fatalities.

=== Electrification: 1923–1925 ===
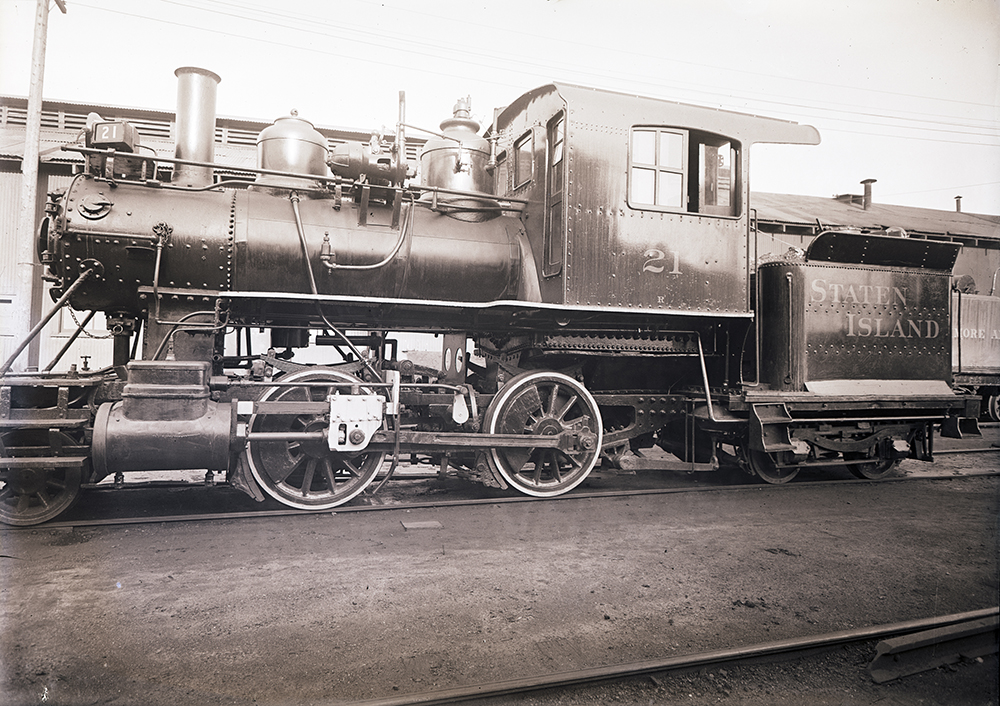
A view of a steam locomotive that used to run on the SIRT prior to electrification.

On June 2, 1923, the Kaufman Act was signed by Governor Al Smith, mandating that all railroads in New York City–including the SIRT—be electrified by January 1, 1926. As a result, the B&O drew up electrification plans, which were submitted to the PSC. The plans were approved by the PSC on May 1, 1924, and construction began on August 1, 1924. The SIRT was to be electrified using 600 volt D.C. third-rail power distribution so it would be compatible with the Brooklyn–Manhattan Transit (BMT) once a planned tunnel was completed under the Narrows to Brooklyn, connecting the line to the BMT Fourth Avenue Line of the New York City Subway system. The B&O planned to use this tunnel to connect its freight from New Jersey to freight terminals in Brooklyn and Queens, including to a planned port at Jamaica Bay. The city started construction on the Narrows tunnel in 1924. Due to political pressure and the project's increasing cost, the freight tunnel portion of the plan was eliminated in 1925, and the entire project was halted in 1926. Only the shafts at either end were constructed. The SIRT ordered ninety electric motors and ten trailers (later converted to motors) from the Standard Steel Car Company to replace the old steam equipment. These cars, the ME-1s, were designed to be similar to the Standards in use by the BMT.

The first electric train was operated on the South Beach Branch between South Beach and Fort Wadsworth on May 20, 1925, and regular electric operation began on the branch on June 5, 1925. As part of the electrification project, the South Beach Branch was extended one stop to Wentworth Avenue from the previous terminus at South Beach. Wentworth Avenue had a short, wooden, half-car platform, and a shelter was built there. That location had previously been used as a servicing and turning point for the line's steam-powered locomotives. Electric service began on the Perth Amboy sub-division on July 1, 1925, to much fanfare. The North Shore Branch's electrification was completed on December 25, 1925, and resulted in a time savings of ten minutes from Arlington to St. George. Following the electrification of all three branches, service was increased by nineteen trains on the Perth Amboy sub-division, by the fifteen trains on the South Beach Branch, and by five trains on the North Shore Branch.

Because of the high cost of electrification, however, St. George and Arlington Yards, along with the Mount Loretto Spur, and the Travis Branch were not electrified. Thirteen steam engines were retired and four new, wholly automatic substations opened at South Beach, Old Town Road, Eltingville, and Tottenville. The SIRT's old semaphore signals were replaced by new color position light signals. This was the first permanent use of the type of signal on the B&O–it later became the railroad's standard. A modern signaling system was put into place in the Saint George Yards, allowing one dispatcher to do all the work. The Clifton Junction Shops were updated to maintain electric equipment rather than steam equipment, and a large portion of the yard was electrified. Grade crossing elimination began between Prince's Bay and Pleasant Plains. While electrification was being installed, the system's roadbed was rebuilt with 100-pound rail.

The promise of a faster, more reliable electrified service spurred developers and private individuals to purchase land alongside the SIRT lines, with the intention of providing housing to attract residents to Staten Island. On July 2, 1925, for the first time since its opening, the railroad stopped reserving its trains' first cars for smokers. A petition was sent to the railroad to reverse this decision.

In the end of 1924, work began on a project to elevate the track to eliminate six grade crossings on the Perth Amboy Division between Pleasant Plains and Prince's Bay and to add 0.82 miles (1.32 km) of double-track to complete the double-tracking of the entire line. The cost of the project was shared by the SIRT, New York State, and New York City. Work on this project was completed in 1926, and the State made the final payment on the project on August 15, 1927. Work on the $1,050,000 project was 85 percent complete at the start of 1926. As part of the project, new brick building stations were constructed. The double-tracking required the installation of rock-fill.

In 1926, the New York State Transit Commission ordered the installation of automatic signals at 18 grade crossings on the SIR for $47,000. These signals were in operation since the middle of September 1927.

=== Expansion ===
In the 1920s, a branch was built to haul materials to construct the Outerbridge Crossing. The branch ran along the West Shore from the Richmond Valley station, and originally ended at Allentown Lane in Charleston, past the end of Drumgoole Boulevard. The branch was cut back south of the bridge after the bridge was completed. The Gulf Oil Corporation opened a dock and tank farm along the Arthur Kill in 1928; to serve it, the Travis Branch was built south from Arlington Yard into the marshes of the island's western shore to Gulfport. At this time, the B&O proposed to join the two branches along the West Shore. The West Shore Line, once completed, would have allowed trains to run between Arlington on the North Shore sub-division and Tottenville on the Perth Amboy sub-division. In addition, freight from the Perth Amboy sub-division would no longer be delayed by the congestion of Saint George Yard and the frequent passenger service of the SIRT. This proposal was canceled because of the Great Depression.

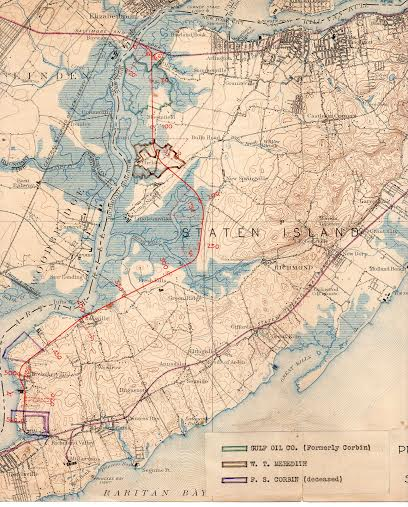
This map from 1922 shows the proposed connected West Shore Line.

In the 1930s, there was a proposal to build a loop joining the Perth Amboy sub-division at Grasmere with the North Shore Branch at Port Richmond. There also was a proposal to join the North Shore Branch to Tottenville without using the existing West Shore tracks. Staten Island Borough President Joseph A. Palma, in 1936, proposed to extend Staten Island Rapid Transit to Manhattan (via New Jersey) across the Bayonne Bridge, which had been built to accommodate two train tracks. The Port of New York Authority endorsed the second plan in 1937, with a terminal at 51st Street in Manhattan near Rockefeller Center to serve the trains of Erie, West Shore, Lackawanna, Jersey Central, and trains from Staten Island. This original proposal would be brought back in 1950, by Edward Corsi, a Republican candidate for Mayor of New York City.

In 1931, Cedar Avenue station opened with the construction of wooden platforms at the Cedar Avenue grade crossing on the South Beach Branch.

On February 4, 1932, the headway on trains was decreased to 15 minutes from 20 minutes between 9:29 p.m. and 10:29 p.m.; and was decreased to 30 minutes from 40 minutes between 10:29 p.m. and 1:29 a.m. on the Perth Amboy Division.

On June 14, 1948, a bill to permit the SIRT to widen its railroad tunnel at the Saint George Ferry Terminal was signed into law. The tunnel, which was constructed under Federally owned land, was widened 19 feet (5.8 m) for a distance of 456 feet (139 m). The tunnel allowed for the laying of a third track, and permitted the operation of more trains from Saint George to Tottenville and South Beach. The extra track also facilitated better handling of trains at the ferry terminal at Saint George.

=== Grade crossing elimination: 1926–1950 ===
On June 25, 1926, the Transit Commission ordered the elimination of four grade crossings on Staten Island—at Bay Street in Clifton, and at Hope Avenue, Belair Road, and Tompkins Avenue in Fort Wadsworth. The project would cost $1,000,000, with half of the cost going to the railroad and a quarter each to the city and state. At the time, the grade crossing at Bay Street was thought of as the most dangerous grade crossing on Staten Island. The SIRT sued the Transit Commission, arguing that it did not have the power to order the construction of such projects. The Court of Appeals ruled in favor of the Transit Commission on July 23, 1926. The case was carried to the Supreme Court, which decided to hear the case "for a lack of jurisdiction."

On November 27, 1929, the Transit Commission held hearings on proposals to eliminate eleven grade crossings in Dongan Hills and Grasmere at Old Town Road, Buel Avenue, Liberty Avenue, Seaview Avenue, Garretson Avenue, Cromwell Avenue, Tysen Lane, Burgher Avenue, Clove Road, Parkinson Avenue and Grasmere Avenue. On September 14, 1932, the Transit Commission approved plans for the elimination of these eleven grade crossings.

The Grasmere–Dongan Hills grade crossing elimination project was completed in 1934. The project eliminated eleven crossings and cost $1,576,000. The crossings were removed by putting the line in an open cut through Grasmere and elevating it through Dongan Hills. As part of the project, a new street—North Railroad Avenue— was constructed, paralleling the line's north side from Clove Road to Parkinson Avenue.

The East Shore sub-division was elevated in 1936–1937 to remove several grade crossings. A huge undertaking was required to remove grade crossings on the North Shore sub-division. The Port Richmond-Tower Hill viaduct was built to remove eight grade crossings; it was longer than a mile and became the largest grade crossing elimination project in the United States. The viaduct opened on February 25, 1937, marking the final part of a $6,000,000 grade crossing elimination project on Staten Island, which eliminated 34 grade crossings on the north and south shores. A two-car special train, which carried Federal, state, and borough officials, made a run over the viaduct and the seven-mile project. Stations closed for the viaduct project at Tower Hill and Port Richmond were reopened on this date.

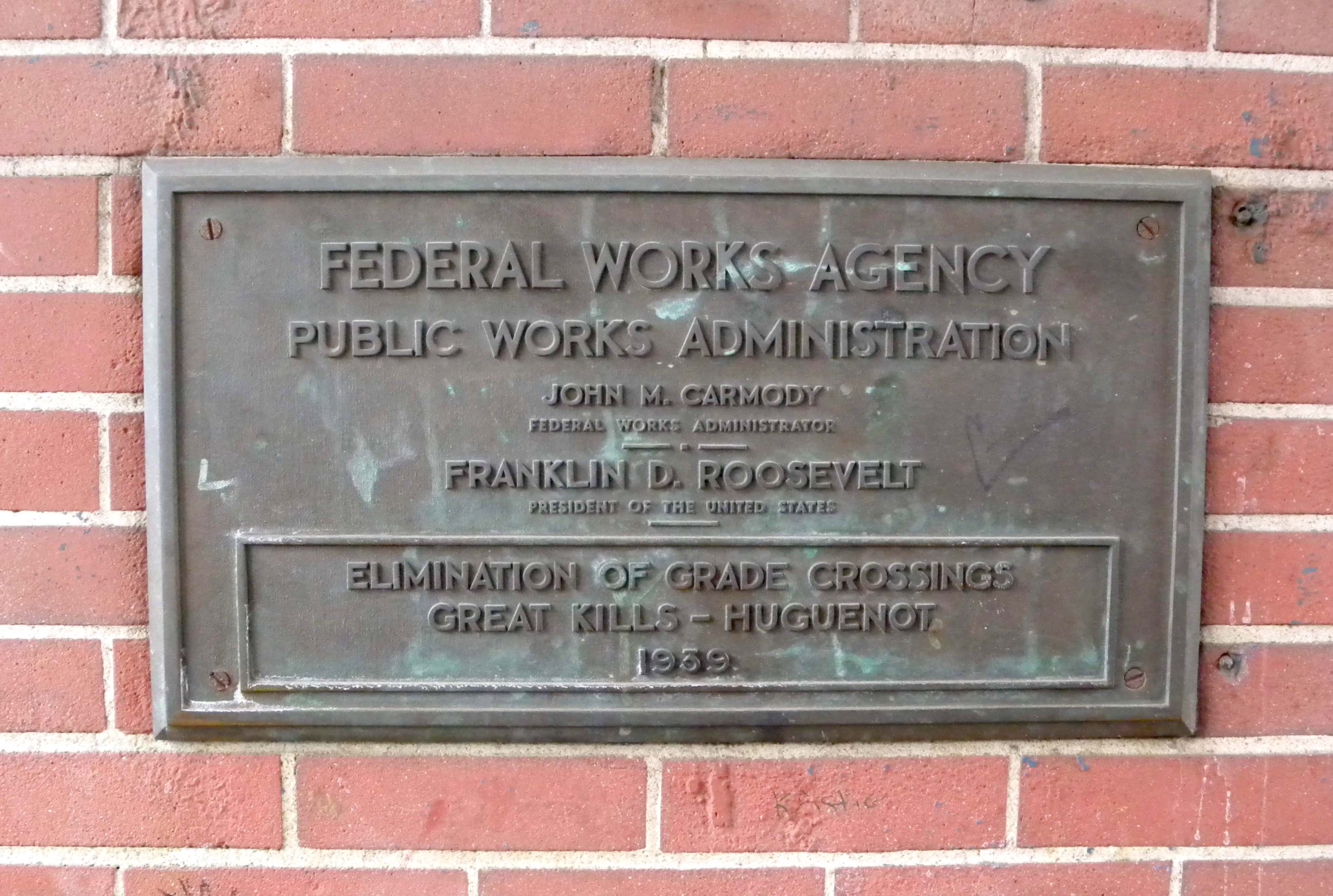
This plaque at Eltingville commemorates the completion of the grade crossing elimination project between Great Kills and Huguenot.

Between 1938 and 1940, a grade crossing elimination project was undertaken over three miles between Great Kills and Huguenot, eliminating seven grade crossings and costing $2,136,000, which was partially paid for by the city, state, and Progress Work Administration funds. The line was depressed into an open cut between Great Kills and Huguenot, with the exception of a section through Eltingville where it was elevated. Four stations—Great Kills, Eltingville, Annadale and Huguenot—were completely replaced with new stations along the rebuilt right-of-way. The project started on July 13, 1938, and was completed in October 1940. The stations themselves were completed in 1939, and therefore have the date 1939 inscribed either on road overpasses or on railroad bridges.

In that same year, grade crossing eliminations were completed in Richmond Valley and Tottenville. The Richmond Valley project eliminated the crossing at Richmond Valley Road and cost $300,000 while the Tottenville project eliminated seven crossings—including one at Main Street—and cost $997,000. The only remaining grade crossings to be removed were at Grant City, New Dorp, Oakwood Heights, and Bay Terrace. These projects were delayed due to material shortages during World War II. In 1949, a project to eliminate 13 grade crossings on the Perth Amboy sub-division, at Grant City, New Dorp, Oakwood Heights and Bay Terrace, was set to begin, with a projected cost of $7,400,000. On August 30, 1950, the PSC announced a $6,500,000 plan to eliminate grade crossings of the SIRT. The plan was only approved with the assurance from the city that if passenger service was discontinued, the city would guarantee residents of the area would have some form of public transportation. The plan also included the construction of a bridge over the never-built Willowbrook Expressway.

=== World War II ===
Freight and World War II traffic helped pay off some of the debt the SIRT had accumulated, briefly making it profitable. B&O freight trains operated to Staten Island and Jersey City. Around this time, B&O crews began running through without changing at different junctions. Regular B&O crews and Staten Island crews were separated, meaning the crews had to change before they could enter Staten Island. All traffic to and from Cranford Junction in New Jersey was handled by the SIRT crews. During the war, all east coast military hospital trains were handled by the SIRT—the trains came onto Staten Island through Cranford Junction, with some trains stopping at Arlington to transfer wounded soldiers to Halloran Hospital. Freight tonnage doubled on the SIRT between 1942 and 1944 to a record 3.2 million tons. The Baltimore and New York Railway line become extremely busy, handling 742,000 troops, 100,000 prisoners-of-war, and war material operating over this stretch to reach their destinations. Two B&O subsidiaries, the B&NY and the SIRT, were merged on December 31, 1944. Since the Baltimore and New York Railway opened in 1890, the SIRT operated this line with locomotives belonging to itself and to its parent company, the B&O. Around the time of World War II, the B&O operated special trains for important officials. One special was operated for former Prime Minister of the United Kingdom, Sir Winston Churchill. The train took him to Stapleton, from where he boarded a ship to Europe. The SIRT made special arrangements for the trip, including a shined-up locomotive sporting polished rods, white tires, and an engine crew clad in white uniforms.

=== Fires ===
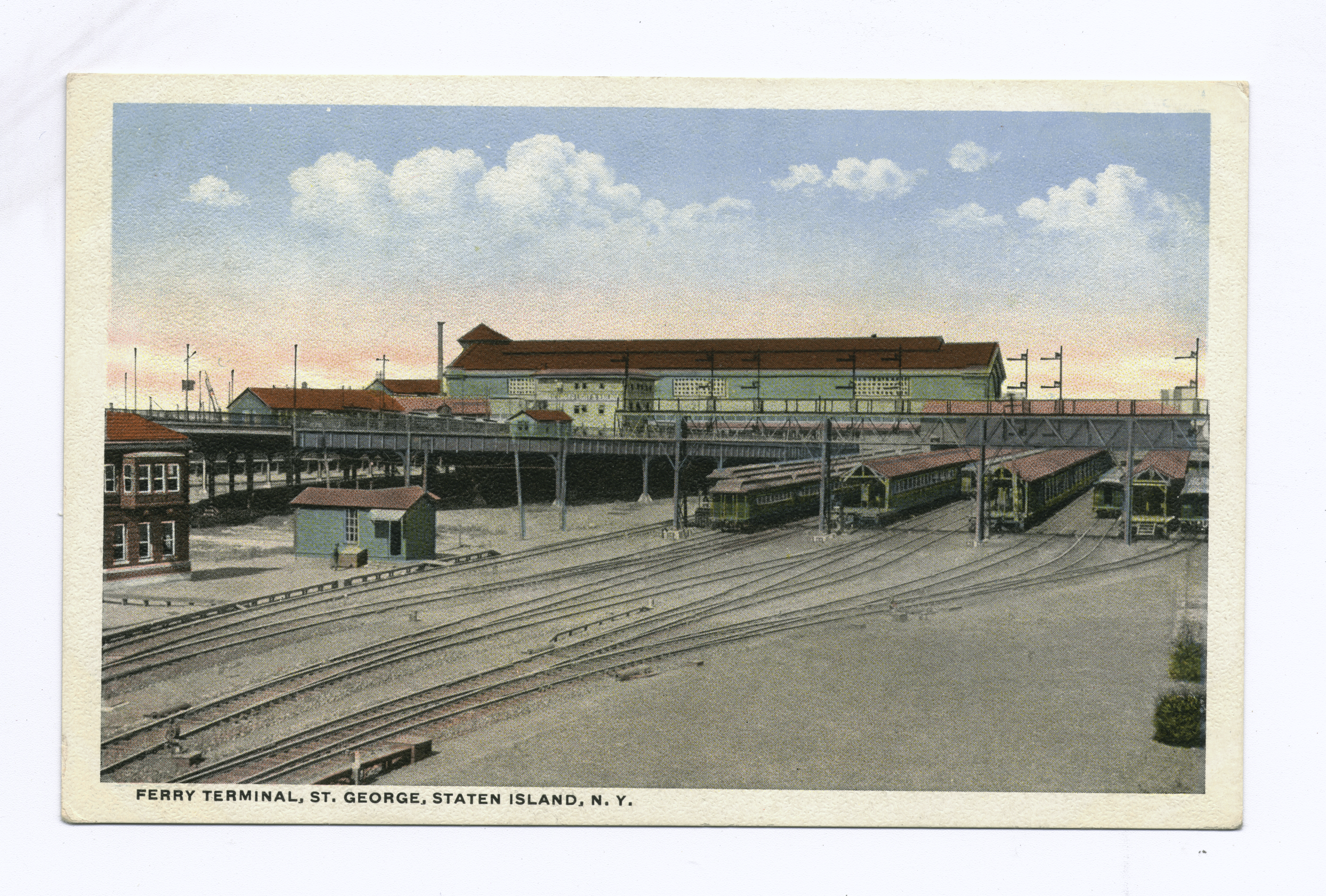
A view of St. George Terminal before its destruction by a fire in 1946.

Tottenville station was destroyed by a fire on September 3, 1929. The fire was attributed to a short-circuited third rail. The two 550 foot (170 m)-long platforms were destroyed, as were five train cars being stored near the station. The damage was estimated to cost $200,000. Passengers using the Perth Amboy Ferry were forced to use the nearby Atlantic station instead.

On June 25, 1946, a fire wrecked the terminal at Saint George, killing three people and causing damage worth $22,000,000. The fire destroyed the ferry terminal and the four ships used for Manhattan service, the terminal for Staten Island Rapid Transit trains, and a small building and ship owned by the city and used by the Army and Navy to transport personnel from Staten Island to the United States Naval Depot at Bayonne, New Jersey. Twenty rail cars were also destroyed in the fire. Since the power circuits were melted, the electric MUs were trapped in the station. Diesel cars were sent to rescue them, but would not couple with the MUs due to their different coupling systems. Some cars were saved through the use of rigging tow chains, but precious minutes were lost. 5 cars were totally destroyed in the fire, while 16 suffered heavy damage. A few cars were sent to Clifton shops, with the others kept at St. George with their windows boarded up.

Two days after the fire, the city voted $3,000,000 to start work on a new $12,000,000 terminal that would be opened in 1948. Until a temporary terminal could be built at Saint George, Tompkinsville was used as the main terminal. Even though the station was very narrow and its facilities were inadequate, service continued without an issue and without any injuries. The station handled the equivalent of 128 passenger loads per day.

On June 8, 1951, a modern replacement terminal for Saint George opened, although portions of the terminal were phased into service at earlier dates.

== Service scaledowns and the end of B&O operation: 1947–1971 ==
=== Transfer of ferry service: 1947–1948 ===
On October 28, 1947, the SIRT filed with the Interstate Commerce Commission (ICC) to get permission to discontinue ferry service between Tottenville and Perth Amboy Ferry Slip in Perth Amboy, New Jersey. The SIRT said the abandonment should be permitted because of "the substantial deficits being incurred in operation of the service, which covers a distance of 3,600 feet". On the same date, Mayor John Delaney of Perth Amboy created a plan to fight the SIRT's proposal. He criticized the railroad for failing to notify the city of its intentions. On September 22, 1948, the ICC allowed the SIRT to abandon the ferry, which it had been operating for 88 years. On October 16, the ferry operation was transferred to Sunrise Ferries of Elizabeth, New Jersey, which had agreed to lease the railway's ferry facilities at Tottenville and to lease Perth Amboy wharf and dock properties there. The schedules and the five-cent fare for the ferry were maintained. In 1963, Perth Amboy ferry service was discontinued.

=== Service cuts and the discontinuation of service: 1948–1953 ===
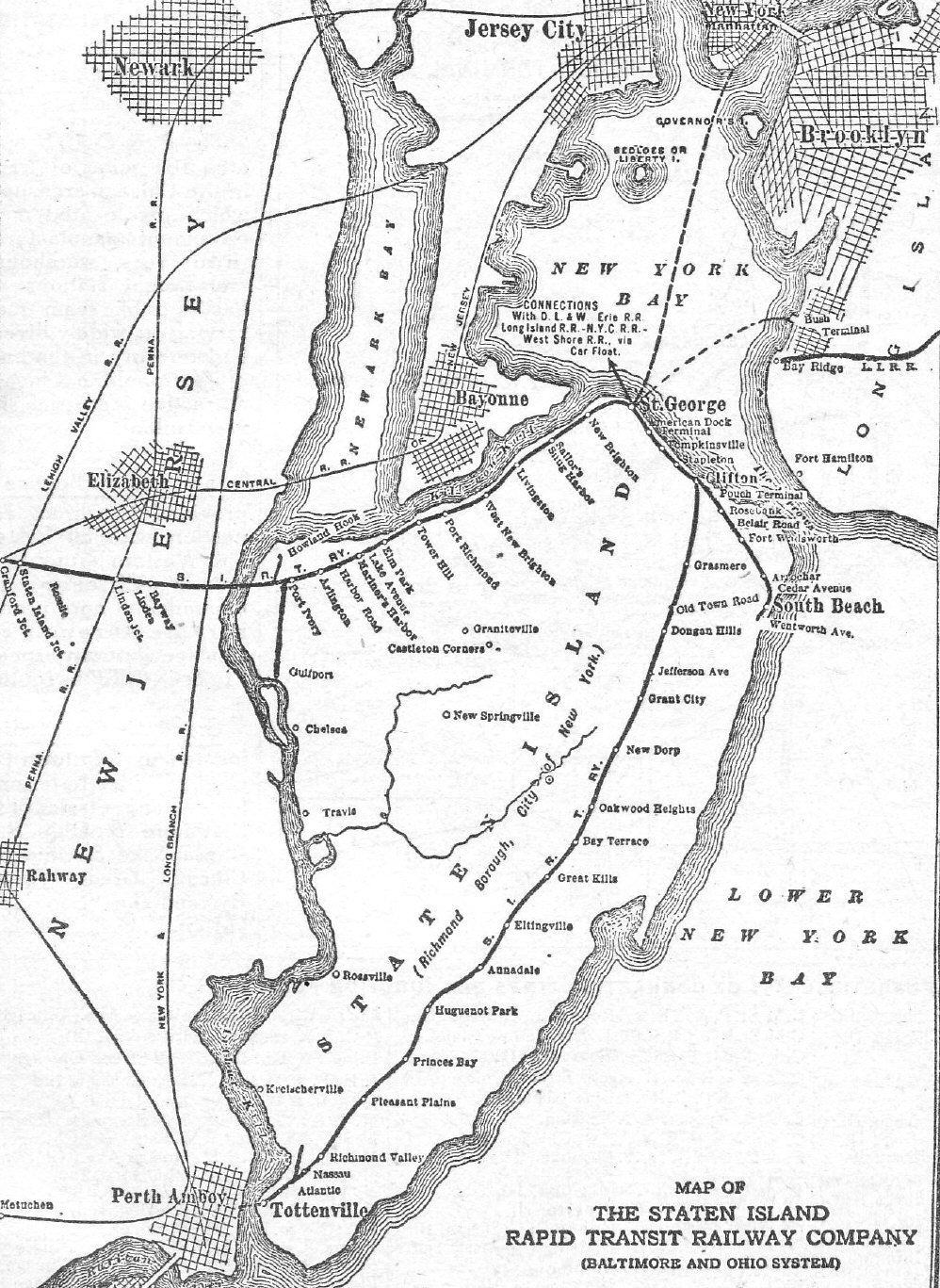
This map of the Staten Island Rapid Transit from 1952 shows the system at its greatest extent, and was published a year before service on the North Shore and South Beach branches was discontinued.

On July 1, 1948, the New York City Board of Transportation took over all of the bus lines on Staten Island. As a result, the bus fare on Staten Island dropped from five cents per zone (twenty cents Tottenville to the ferry) to seven cents for the whole island, to match the fare of the other city-owned bus lines. The cheaper bus fare resulted in an exodus of passengers from the SIRT. In 1947, the SIRT had carried 12.3 million passengers but after the decrease in bus fares the number decreased to 8.7 million in 1948 and to 4.4 million in 1949. Three months after the change, passenger traffic dropped 32 percent on the Tottenville Division and 40 percent on the other two divisions. The buses saw a 25 percent increase in ridership.

Due to the loss of ridership, on August 28, 1948, the SIRT announced it would reduce service on all three branches on September 5. Service would be reduced from 15-minute intervals in non-rush hours to 30 minutes during that time, and from 5 to 10 minutes in rush hours to 10 to 15 minutes during rush hours. The day afterwards, Richmond Borough President Cornelius A. Hall and Staten Island civic organizations announced they would oppose the proposed cuts. The PSC elected not to prevent the cut in service on September 2, 1948, and the cut went into effect three days later. 237 of the previous 492 weekday trains were cut and the schedule of expresses was reduced during rush hours. In addition, all night trains after 1:29 a.m. were eliminated. The reduction of trips resulted in the firing of 30 percent of the company's personnel.

On September 7, 1948, Borough President Hall continued to oppose the SIRT's cuts at a PSC hearing in Manhattan. Commuters testified that trains were missing connections to ferry boats and that some trains were being held at the St. George Terminal during rush hour to wait for two boatloads of passengers. Previously, they said, the trains pulled out with only one boatload of passengers. On September 13, 1948, the SIRT agreed to add four trains and to extend the schedule of four others. On January 5, 1949, the PSC recommended the SIRT restore the service cut; if it refused, the PSC would order the SIRT to restore the service. Hall suggested lowering the fare to 10 cents or a 20-cent round trip to make the service more competitive with the buses on the island. On January 29, 1949, the PSC ordered the SIRT to restore five trains and to reschedule seven other trains for public convenience, and gave the SIRT until February 13 to carry out the order.

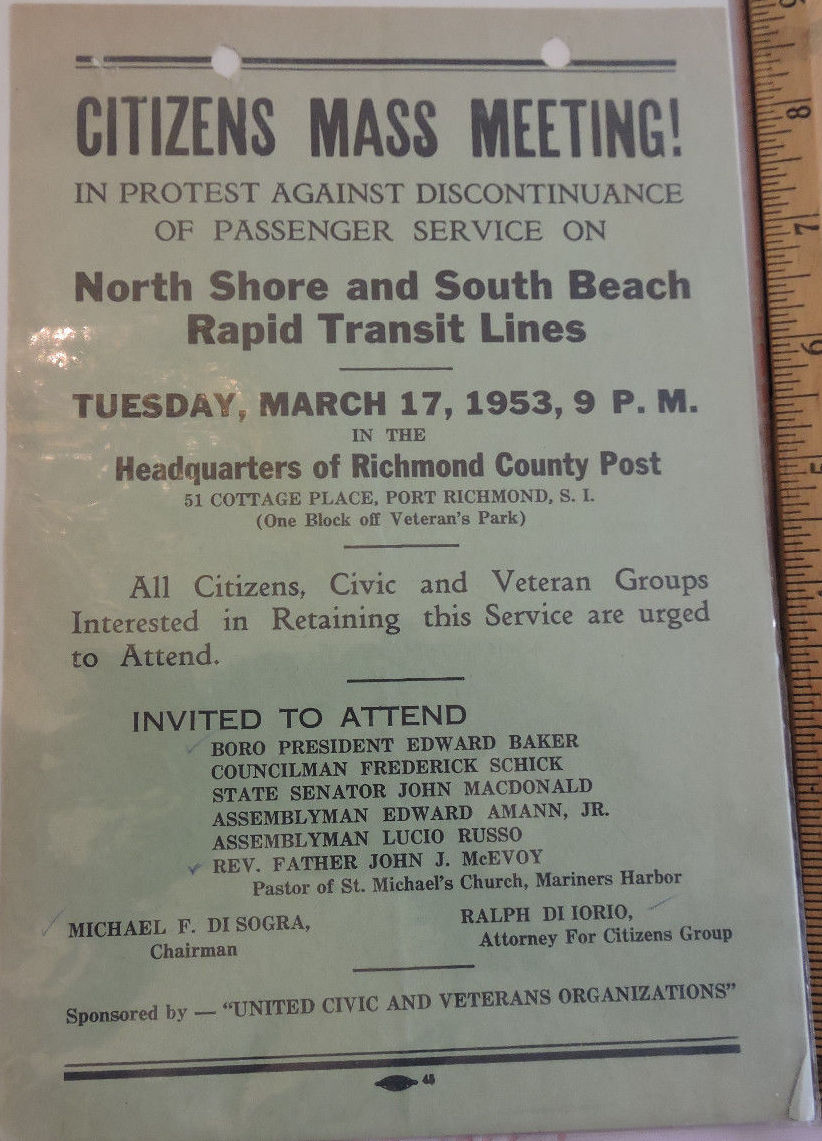
This poster called for people, and public officials, to rally against the scheduled discontinuation of service on the North Shore and South Beach Branches later in March 1953.

On May 20, 1949, the SIRT announced it intended to discontinue all of its passenger services and that it would seek permission from the PSC to do so, citing the loss of $1,061,716 in 1948. The PSC response was to rule that the railroad must continue its operations or substitute them with buses, otherwise the city should take over the railroad service as part of the municipal transit system. The SIRT made another request to discontinue its passenger service on June 3, 1952, with a date set of July 7. On June 16, the PSC ordered the SIRT to continue all of its passenger services pending a decision on the line's request to abandon its service. On July 9, hearings concerning the proposed abandonment of the railroad began. On July 16, the PSC counsel stated the operating deficits that had been charged to the SIRT's passenger service would disappear if they were included with the freight profits of the B&O in the New York area. After the hearings, the SIRT changed its planned abandonment date to September 12, 1952. The commissioner council said a provision for an additional two months of service, extending it to November 12, 1952, needed to be made.

On December 19, 1952, the PSC gave the SIRT permission to discontinue service on the North Shore Branch and South Beach Branch after March 31, 1953, because of city-operated bus competition. The discontinuation brought the SIRT an estimated annual saving of $308,000. The South Beach Branch was abandoned shortly thereafter while the North Shore Branch continued to carry freight. Bus service on parallel lines was increased to make up for the loss of service on these branches. By 1955, the third rails on both of the lines were removed.

=== City steps in to subsidize Tottenville service: 1954–1971 ===
While the SIRT had successfully discontinued service on the North Shore Branch and South Beach Branch, it was not successful in its endeavors to discontinue service to Tottenville. On September 7, 1954, the SIRT made an application to discontinue all passenger service on the Tottenville sub-division on October 7, 1954. The PSC warned that if it discontinued its passenger service, action would be taken to remove the SIRT's parent company, the B&O Railroad, from Staten Island, meaning the end of its prospering freight operation. A large city subsidy allowed passenger service on the Tottenville sub-division to continue. Since this sub-division did not need the trains cars left over from the closure of the North Shore and South Beach lines, the SIRT sold 35 of them, of which 5 were trailers, to the New York City Transit Authority (NYCTA) in 1953–1954 for $10,000 each.

A bill allowing New York City to lease service on the Tottenville line was approved by Governor Harriman on March 20, 1956, paving the way for an agreement between the city and the B&O. On December 13, 1956, the PSC approved an agreement between the B&O and New York City that ensured the Tottenville line would continue to operate; as part of the deal, New York City leased the line's passenger facilities for 20 years and received a small percentage of the line's net income. The SIRT continued to collect revenue and operate service. In addition, the city repaid all taxes owed by the railroad to the city. The agreement went into effect on January 1, 1957. The SIRT's financial troubles continued and in February 1960, it asked the city for $3,870,000 in subsidies, threatening to ask the PSC for permission to discontinue the service if the funds were not provided. In 1959, the SIRT lost $1,100,000, with an average daily ridership of 4,000. On August 25, 1960, the Board of Estimate approved an amendment of the city's contract with the SIRT to increase the annual subsidy. Over the next ten years, the aid was increased from $4,000,000 to $8,400,000.

On April 5, 1962, a fire at Clifton Yard destroyed seven ME-1 train cars and a warehouse, adding to 13 lost in two previous fires and two that were scrapped, leaving the SIRT with only 48 cars to operate regular service. This car shortage meant 44 of its 48 train cars were in service during rush hours, leaving a small margin for errors. To maintain the previous level of service, the SIRT had carefully scheduled maintenance for their train cars; a number of trains were rushed back to Saint George as passenger-free expresses after dropping their loads in the evening rush, helping make up for the lack of train cars. The NYCTA set aside nine BMT Standards for possible transfer to the SIRT. The SIRT also looked at a proposal to transfer some D-type cars. Neither of the proposals were acted upon.

On July 13, 1967, Mayor John Lindsay announced the city was considering purchasing the 48 air conditioned train cars used at Montreal's Expo 67 to transport passengers between the city and the exposition grounds. The cars would have cost $3,840,000, or about $80,000 each, and were expected to be available in October once the fair closed. These cars were 11.7 percent larger than the cars then in service on the SIRT. Operation of the Tottenville line would be turned over to the Staten Island Rapid Transit Operating Authority (a division of the state's Metropolitan Transportation Authority) on July 1, 1971.

=== Freight operations: 1957–1971 ===
On October 21, 1957, four years after North Shore sub-division passenger trains ended, a train from Washington, D.C.—the last SIRT special—carried Queen Elizabeth II and Prince Philip across the Arthur Kill Bridge en route to the Staten Island Ferry after a meeting with President Eisenhower. The special train movement was conducted in secrecy and the tracks along the route were cleared for this occasion. The train traveled over B&O, Reading Company, and Lehigh Valley lines to get to Staten Island Junction and the SIRT. The royal train, along with a press train, ended its run at a freight yard at Stapleton.

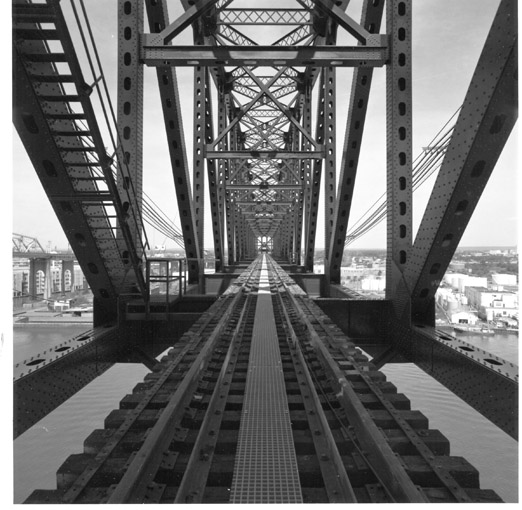
A view of the Arthur Kill Lift Bridge built in 1958.

In November 1947, the Arthur Kill swing bridge was knocked off its center pier foundation by a passing oil tanker, rendering the bridge useless. Freight had to be rerouted through float bridges, with most of it passing through the Central Railroad of New Jersey's yards. The bridge was then condemned by the Army Corps of Engineers. Work on a replacement span started in 1955. On August 25, 1959, the damaged bridge was replaced with a state-of-the-art, single track, 558-foot (170 m) vertical lift bridge. The 2,000 ton lift span was prefabricated then floated into place. The new bridge was raised 135 feet (41 m); because the new bridge aided navigation on the Arthur Kill, the United States Government assumed 90 percent of the $11,000,000 cost of the project. The old bridge had been condemned and ordered replaced by the United States Secretary of the Army in 1949, with an expected cost of $8,000,000 to be split between the SIRT and the U.S. Government. When the bridge reopened, long-unit coal trains from West Virginia began using an extension of the Travis Branch, on Staten Island's West Shore to serve a new Consolidated Edison power plant in Travis.

The closure of Bethlehem Steel in 1960 and of U.S. Gypsum in 1972 led to a dramatic decline in rail traffic via the Arthur Kill Bridge, although there still was enough traffic in the 1970s to keep car floats reasonably busy.

=== Final grade-crossing elimination: 1960–1964 ===
On November 7, 1960, an accident took place at the grade crossing at North Railroad Avenue and Bancroft Avenue, four blocks away from the New Dorp station. An eight-year-old girl was killed and 31 children were injured as a train struck a crowded school bus as it was about to exit the crossing. A grand jury had ordered the closure of this crossing and 12 others along this stretch of the line, after a train killed a high-school girl at a crossing eight blocks away in December 1959. The railroad had been given an extension of time so it could install gates. On November 10, 1960, Staten Island Borough President Albert Maniscalco ordered the closure of this grade crossing and announced that he expected work on eliminating the grade crossing to begin the following year.

On August 29, 1964, the PSC approved a $10,923,000 project to eliminate the last remaining grade-crossings on the line between the Jefferson Avenue and Grant City stations. As part of the project, new platforms and station buildings were built at New Dorp and Grant City, and new platforms were built at Jefferson Avenue. To eliminate the grade crossing, the line was raised on an embankment for part of the way and was depressed into an open cut for the rest. To avoid interfering with train service, a temporary track was constructed to the east of the original line and a new, crossing-free line was constructed upon the original right of way.

Following the 1964 opening of the Verrazzano–Narrows Bridge, which directly connected Staten Island with the rest of the city by road, ridership on the SIRT, which had been steadily increasing at a rate of 300,000 a year in the early 1960s, increasing 34 percent between 1960 and 1964, precipitously declined. Annual ridership decreased from 6.4 million in 1964 to 5.7 million in 1965. The previous ridership growth had been despite increasing car ownership.

== See also ==
- History of the Staten Island Railway
  - History of the Staten Island Railway (1836–1899)
  - History of the Staten Island Railway (1971–present)
- History of the New York City Subway
