= History of the Staten Island Railway (1971–present) =

The following outlines the History of the Staten Island Railway from 1971 to the present. The Staten Island Railway's (SIR) Tottenville line, a rapid transit line in the New York City borough of Staten Island, was turned over to the Staten Island Rapid Transit Operating Authority (a division of New York state's Metropolitan Transportation Authority) on July 1, 1971, and the line was purchased by the city of New York. Freight on the line would continue to be handled by the B&O under the Staten Island Railroad. The MTA ordered new trains and renovated stations in the 1970s and 1980s. SIRT was transferred from the New York City Transit Authority's Surface Transit Division to its Department of Rapid Transit in 1993. MetroCard fare payment was introduced in 1994, and fares were removed from most of the line in 1997. A short section of the easternmost portion of the mostly-abandoned North Shore Branch was reopened for passenger service to the Richmond County Bank Ballpark between 2001 and 2010. Further changes in the 21st century included accessibility improvements; the construction of a new Arthur Kill station in the 2010s; and new trains and OMNY fare payment in the 2020s.

Meanwhile, freight service (part of the North Shore Branch), formerly part of the Baltimore and Ohio Railroad (B&O), became part of the larger Chessie System in a merger with the Chesapeake and Ohio Railway (C&O), and the island's freight operation was renamed the Staten Island Railroad Corporation in 1971. Only a few isolated industries on Staten Island continued to use rail services, and in 1985, the Chessie System sold its Staten Island Railway branch to the New York, Susquehanna and Western Railway (NYS&W), a Delaware Otsego (DO) subsidiary. The NYS&W subsequently retained the Staten Island's freight operations; in 1989, the NYS&W ended all freight service to Saint George. In 1991, the Arthur Kill Bridge was removed from service, and the line's final freight train operated in1992. The North Shore Branch and the Arthur Kill Bridge were then taken over by Chessie's successor, CSX Transportation (CSX). The line and bridge were sold again in 1994 to the New York City Economic Development Corporation (NYCEDC), followed by a decade of false starts. During the early 2000s, the Port Authority of New York and New Jersey announced plans to reopen the Staten Island Railroad line in New Jersey. SThe freight line connection from New Jersey to the Staten Island Railroad was completed, and became operated in part by the Morristown and Erie Railway in 2006.

== City operation of passenger service: 1971–present ==
=== Transfer to MTA operation: 1968–1971 ===
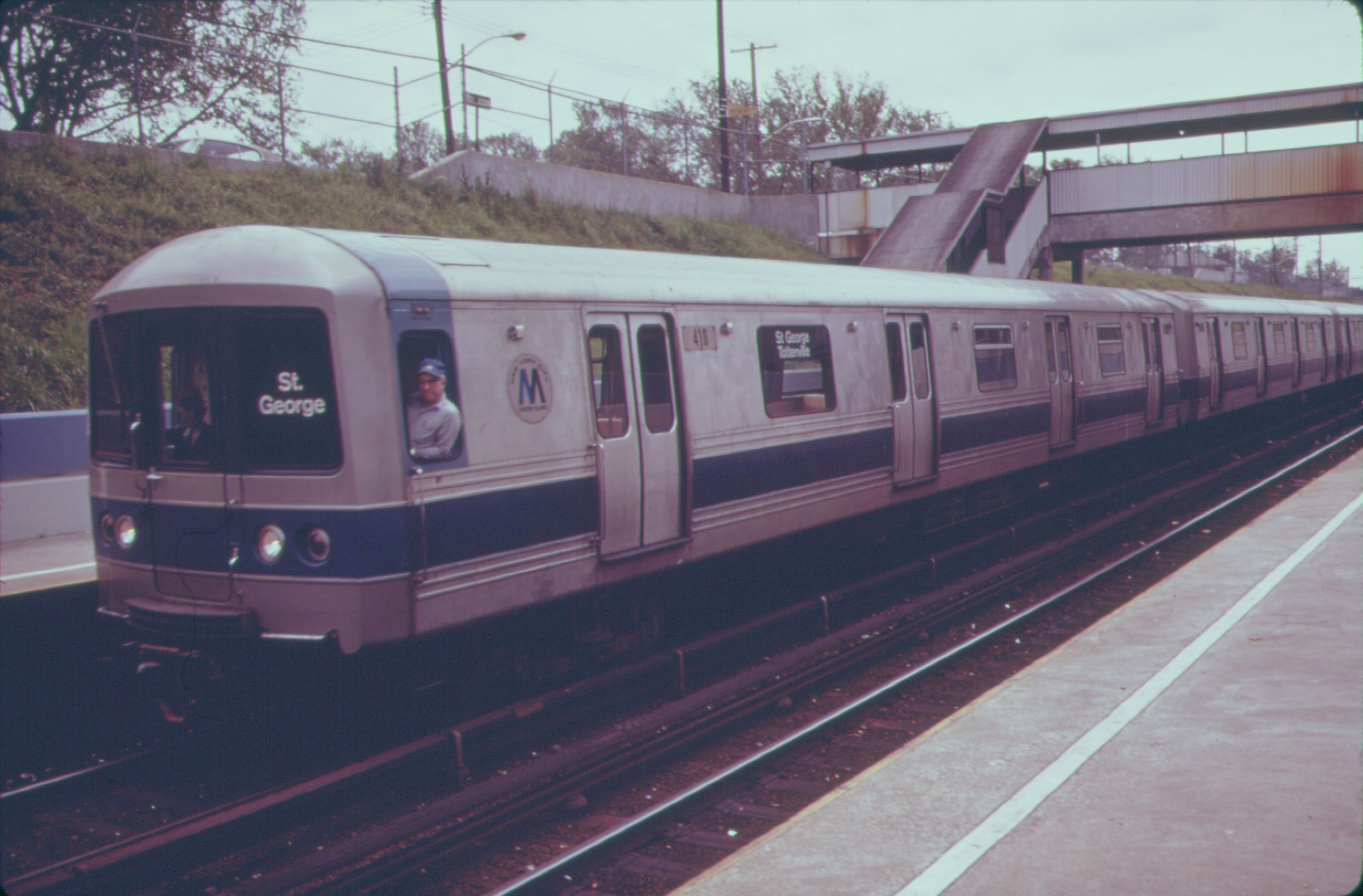
A view of the new R44 train cars put into service once the rail line was under the auspices of the Metropolitan Transportation Authority.

In May 1968, the President of the Metropolitan Transportation Authority (MTA), William Ronan, proposed that New York City take control of the SIRT and spend $25 million on modernizing the line. This proposal was part of a 20-year, $2.9-billion plan announced by the agency on February 28. Some of the money allocated to the SIRT would be used to purchase new trains. On December 18, 1969, the Board of Estimate approved the purchase of the SIRT for $1 and the use of $3.5 million to purchase the line's 48 cars, 70 acres (28 ha) of real estate, the air rights over the tracks, and the line's Clifton Shops. The additional land was purchased to allow for a wider right-of-way, parking lots, and station improvements. As part of the agreement, the Baltimore & Ohio Railroad (B&O) would continue to operate freight service over the line once a day.

On January 1, 1970, New York City's lease of the Tottenville line was terminated; after that date the city reimbursed the railroad for its passenger deficits. On May 29, 1970, New York City and the SIRT entered an agreement for NYC to purchase the Tottenville line, as part of which the SIRT was reserved the right to operate freight service over the line. The city was required to ensure the track was in good condition for SIRT's freight operations. The freight operation was reorganized as the Staten Island Railroad Corporation. On June 29, 1970, the Staten Island Rapid Transit Operating Authority was incorporated as a subsidiary of the state's MTA to acquire and operate the SIRT.

On April 21, 1971, the ICC approved the city's purchase of the line. On July 1, 1971, operation of the Tottenville line was turned over to the Staten Island Rapid Transit Operating Authority, a division of the state's MTA. The line itself was purchased by the City of New York for $1 and the MTA paid the B&O $3.5 million for the line's equipment. Grade crossings along the Tottenville line had to be removed by the B&O to finalize the deal. Grade crossings were supposed to have been eliminated in the 1930s but a lack of finances—partially resulting from the Great Depression and World War II—prevented it.

=== Despite MTA improvements, problems persist: 1970s and 1980s ===
On June 15, 1972, five 1955-built, air-conditioned coaches on loan from the Long Island Rail Road (LIRR) went into service on the SIRT. One three-car train made one round trip during the morning and operated again during the afternoon peak. As a result of previous tests, the edges of the platforms at St. George were trimmed for the extra clearance required by the LIRR cars, which were 85 feet (26 m) long. The cars were only 15 feet (4.6 m) longer than the 45 cars in operation but had a seating capacity of 123 passengers—almost double the capacity of the other coaches.

On February 1, 1972, the fare on the SIRT was increased for the first time since 1958, to 35 cents from an average fare of 22 cents; the system used to have zoned fares. The fare increase applied to the whole system and was accompanied by the elimination of commutation tickets and student tickets. Previously, fares ranged from 20 to 35 cents. Sixteen percent of riders of the 17,000 daily riders had no change in fare. There was a 10 percent increase for 51 percent of passengers and a 15 percent increase for the remaining 33 percent. The fare increase was expected to bring in an extra $400,000 a year.

At the time, the line was operating at a deficit of $2.9 million a year, with $2.5 million of it offset by a subsidy from the city. The MTA had plans for a $25 million improvement program for the line including new train cars. Improvements were also planned for the tower and signal systems, for the roadbed and for the stations. Increased power, 8,000 feet (2,400 m) of new rails, and mercury-vapor lighting at 14 of the 22 stations were also part of the plan. Three quarters of the $25 million were to be provided by 1967 state transportation bond issue and the remaining $6.25 million was to be paid by the city.

On February 28, 1973, the first six new R44 cars were put into service on the SIRT. These were part of a 52-car order from the Saint Louis Car Company—the same type of cars as the newest cars then in use on subway lines in the other boroughs. The R44s replaced the ME-1 rolling stock inherited from the B&O that had remained in continuous service since 1925 when the system was electrified.

During the 1970s, the MTA's ability to improve service on the line was hampered by several strikes by the SIRT's workers. From December 11, 1975, to April 1976, service on the SIRT was shut down because the line's 61 motormen and conductors went on strike. The strike ended once the MTA agreed to give them 14% wage increases.

In December 1976, SIRTOA recently completed projects to provide remote control of SIRT's electrical substations from the central one at St. George, and to install a two-way radio system. The former project improved the reliability of the system's power system, while the latter provided direct communication between the St. George control center and all trains, allowing information about the status of SIRT operations to be sent immediately to train staff and passengers on trains.

In December 1977, SIRTOA was preparing to begin construction on a pair of projects that would allow longer four-car trains to be run during rush hours regularly. New York City covered 25 percent of the cost of the projects, while New York State covered the remaining 75 percent. The first project was the construction of a new electrical substation capable of handling 4,000 kilowatts in Grant City, and the second was the expansion and modernization of the repair shop at Clifton Yard.

Work on the new Grant City substation building, which would cost $506,592, was expected to start in January 1978 and be completed by March 1979, while the installation of electrical equipment, which would cost $1.8 million, would begin in September 1978 and be completed in 1980. The project was the first in a series of improvement part of a long-term program to upgrade the SIRT's electrical supply and make it more reliable. In later phases, the new equipment installed in the new Grant City substation would also be installed in older substations on the line. In response to complaints from nearby residents, the design of the substation was modified to blend in with the character of the surrounding residential area, and would be constructed within the SIRT's open cut right-of-way. In addition, greenery and shrubs would be installed to beautify the structure's roof, which was located at street level. Work on the project was finally underway in April 1979, and was expected to be completed by the end of 1980.

The Clifton Yard project was planned to improve the maintenance of the SIRT's new fleet of R44 cars. This $3.9 million project, as of December 1977, was expected to begin in 1978 and be completed by the end of 1979. The project would extend and modernize the car maintenance shop, and construct new storage facilities, and a new two-story motor and wheel repair shop. The extension of the existing maintenance shop would allow the inspection pits to be rebuilt. These pits were designed to fit the ME-1 cars, which were 8 feet (2.4 m) shorter than the R44 cars. The improvements at the shop would increase the number of cars that could be overhauled and inspected daily by 50 percent. As of April 1979, work was expected to be completed by the middle of 1980.

On August 6, 1980, an MTA committee evaluated whether it should continue operating the rail line. On September 28, 1981, Assemblyman Robert Straniere announced that half of the $25 million allocated for capital improvements to the SIRT from bond use funds would be used for improved power distribution and the modernization of stations. Eleven stations would have their platforms extended, completing the extension of platforms along the line and two stations would have their wooden platforms replaced. In addition, equipment at four substations would be improved, new switches would be installed at Tottenville interlocking, and the wye track at St. George would be realigned to fit four-car trains, among other improvements. As part of the MTA's inaugural Capital Program from 1981, Pleasant Plains and Prince's Bay stations were rebuilt and the platforms at several other stations were lengthened.

On September 23, 1985, SIRTOA began work to repair structural problems at ten stations, including crumbling stairways. Temporary access paths, platforms and stairways were constructed to allow service to be maintained while work was underway.

On October 22, 1986, midday service was reduced in frequency from one train every 20 minutes to one every 30 minutes, due to a reduction in ferry service. Weekend service was reduced by 15 trains to 78 and weekday service was reduced by 15 to 109. In the following two years, ridership reduced from 6.47 million to 6.23 million.

=== Improvements in fare collection: 1985–1994 ===
Beginning on December 18, 1985, passengers traveling between 5:50 a.m. and 10 a.m. were required to pay their fares after they exit the train. People exiting at St. George were required to pay their fares by dropping a pre-purchased ticket in a box near twelve turnstiles, which were rearranged to reduce backups. Previously these turnstiles were only used for evening rush hours. At other stations, riders were to pay their fares as they exited station platforms. The change was made to reduce fare evasion. Despite the fact that ridership on the railroad increased 38 percent since 1977, revenue did not grow as conductors collecting tickets often could not get to all passengers in time due to crowding on trains. At the time, tickets could be purchased at Tottenville and St. George at all times, or from Grant City, New Dorp, Dongan Hills, Oakwood Heights, Eltingville and Great Kills between 6 a.m. and 2 p.m.

Tokens began to be accepted at St. George on April 20, 1988. A month later, tokens were used by 80 percent of riders. Tokens could be bought at vending machines between 6 a.m. and 10 a.m. at Huguenot, Annadale, Eltingville, Great Kills, Oakwood Heights, New Dorp, Grant City, and Dongan Hills, and at St. George at all times. On October 18, 1992, the NYCTA began distributing free transfers between the SIRT and bus routes on Staten Island.

On March 31, 1994, MetroCards began being accepted for fare payment at the St. George station, making it the 50th subway or Staten Island Railway station to accept it.

On May 13, 1997, New York City Transit announced it would eliminate on-board fare collection on July 4, meaning that fares would only be paid by riders who boarded or exited St. George, which was the only station with turnstiles. At the time, fares were collected on board by the conductor except on weekday trains arriving at St. George between 5:50 a.m. and 10:50 a.m.. Riders on those trains had to pay their fares upon exiting the station. Fares could be paid using MetroCards, tokens, special fare tickets, or transfers. Riders who alighted at other stations did not have to pay a fare during the morning rush hour.

The change, which was expected to cost $400,000, was part of the "One City, One Fare" fare cuts, would coincide with the elimination of the fare on the Staten Island Ferry, and the institution of free transfers between the railway and subways and buses in Manhattan. With the elimination of on-board fare collection, fares for trips between Tompkinsville and Tottenville would become free. A 1996 study had found that 2,370 of the 9,430 people who got off a St. George-bound train in the morning and 2,330 of the 10,430 people who boarded a Tottenville-bound evening train did so at a station other than St. George. Seven trainmen positions were expected to be affected by the elimination of the on-board collection of fares.

The changes took effect on July 4, 1997 as planned. The union representing the SIR's workers, United Transportation Union local 1440, was worried about the change, in part because of an expected rise in ridership. About 25 percent of riders would potentially get free rides with the change. The removal of fares was blamed for an immediate spike of crime along the line. Police officers and students said that disorderly conduct and fights by students took place more regularly. Crime increased over 200 percent between July and December 1997, compared to the same period in the prior year.

=== Rebranding and service improvements: 1990s ===
Ridership started to decrease in the early 1990s following the start of a series of major repair projects. Over nine years in the 1990s, all of the mainline track on the line was replaced. Though the third rail was supposed to be replaced, only a few hundred feet in Clifton and Tottenville yards were replaced by August 2003.

The MTA rebranded the Staten Island Rapid Transit as the MTA Staten Island Railway (SIR) on April 2, 1994; Staten Island Railway was the line's original name. This move followed the transfer of the Staten Island Rapid Transit from the New York City Transit Authority's Surface Transit Division to the Department of Rapid Transit on July 26, 1993.

On December 2, 1991, service on the SIRT changed from four-car trains to two-car trains between 9 p.m. and 5 a.m. to reduce track and car maintenance costs. In February 1992, it was estimated that the change led to reduced energy costs and a 13 percent reduction in car maintenance costs. This change was originally intended to go into effect by June 1988. In 1988, it was decided to transfer 12 R44 cars from the New York City Subway to the SIR in anticipation of expanding trains to five cars to accommodate an expected growth in ridership and to reduce overcrowding, which did not materialize. During the mid-2000s, some trains did run with five cars. The SIR timetable stated, "Select rush hour trains operate with additional cars. For a more comfortable ride, please use all available cars." Platforms at 18 stations were lengthened to accommodate five-car trains in 1988.

In 1993, a report by the Federal Transit Administration (FTA) criticized the MTA for not installing an automatic speed control (ASC) system on the railway to prevent collisions and overspeed violations. The agency had initially planned on installing a new signaling system on the line in the mid-1980s, but it was dropped from the capital program. The 1992-1996 program allocated $75 million for upgrades to the signal system with ASC, with funds allocated for work in 1996 and 1998. The FTA report also found that train cars did not have speedometers in them; they were added by February 1996.

In 1993, the Dongan Hills station became accessible under the Americans with Disabilities Act of 1990. In April 1996, a $6.7 million projects to repair the St. George, Tompkinsville, Stapleton, New Dorp, Richmond Valley, and Tottenville was scheduled for 1997. In 1998, those renovations were completed.

In November 1996, the results of the Staten Island Transit Needs Assessment Study, which was commissioned by New York City Transit, were made public. Recommendations related to the railway included operating shorter two-car trains instead of four-car trains to enable more frequent service, with not all trains timed to meet the ferry, better marketing for the railway, improved signs leading to train stations, consolidating the Nassau and Atlantic stations into an Arthur Kill station with a parking lot, adding a parking lot at Huguenot, creating a Grasmere transit center, where connections could be made with buses, and restarting service on the North Shore Branch. The study said that service could be restored for $108 million, and could have 17,200 riders a day in 2010. The study also recommended the addition of skip-stop service, the use of improved rolling stock which could accelerate more quickly and improvements in signaling.

On April 7, 1999, three additional afternoon express runs were added to the schedule, supplementing the four previously scheduled express trips. These trips skipped stops between St. George and Great Kills and then made all stops to Tottenville. The trips reduced travel times to Great Kills from 24 minutes to 15 minutes. The additional trips increased the span of express service from 5:11 to 6:02 p.m. to 4:50 to 6:31 p.m.. The existing four trips were used by about 2,280 passengers. The change in service was made in response to a request in August 1998 by Representative Vito Fossella Jr..

On June 24, 2001, a small section of the easternmost portion of the North Shore Branch (a few hundred feet) was reopened to provide passenger service to the new Richmond County Bank Ballpark, home of the Staten Island Yankees minor-league baseball team. The station cost $3.5 million to build. One train was scheduled to travel to/from Tottenville and two or three shuttle trains from St. George served the station. Trains last served the station in September 2009 and the service was discontinued as part of budget cuts on June 18, 2010, the day of the first scheduled home game for the Yankees. The elimination of this service saved $30,000 annually.

=== Consistent growth: 2000s and 2010s ===
In 2000, work began on a four-year project to upgrade the railway's signal system. Work was initially supposed to begin in 1998 and be completed by 2001. In August 2003, work was already over three years late.

In August 2003, it was reported that the SIR would overhaul three railroad bridges (Bay Street south of Clifton, and two crossings of Amboy Road) the following year for $7.2 million, which would require service to operate on a single track in sections. The repair work included replacing the tracks, installing a new waterproof seal over the deck, repairing floor beams, metal panels, drip pans, and girder encasements, and repainting the structures. These bridges were identified for repairs in a 2000 engineering survey. Work would begin following the completion of the signal project and was estimated to take about two years. The 2000 study stated that eight other bridges would need repairs. Those repairs were to take place between 2005 and 2009. An additional 16 bridges would need their waterproofing replaced, and two others had minor structural defects.

In 2004, the SIR put out its preliminary budget for 2005; it proposed several service cuts to offset an increased debt. For 2005, the agency proposed implementing One Person Train Operation, adding fare collection at Tompkinsville, reducing the fleet to 52 cars, eliminating express service, and reducing trains to two cars during off-peak hours. For 2006, it proposed eliminating weekend service from 2 a.m. Saturday to 5 a.m. Monday. Starting on May 1, 2005, SIR trains started running with two cars between 9 p.m. to 5 a.m. every night, stopping near station entrances to deter crime.

In December 2004, the completion on the signaling project was already 18 months late. A three-month phased cutover of the new signaling system was to begin in January 2005, starting from Tottenville and heading northwards. Starting January 21, 2005, the entire line would be closed every weeknight from 10 p.m. to 5 a.m. and all weekends until April.

In June 2005, a new cab signaling system and a new control center went into effect at St. George; the system is still in use as of February 2018 and has received minor upgrades. These improvements cost $100 million and helped enhance safety and increase operational flexibility. The new signal system provided improved signal visibility, continuous speed enforcement, and central monitoring at St. George, and the ability to remotely change switch positions; all switches on the main line were interlocked as part of the project. Previously, dispatchers could only track the position of trains using the signal system as they entered and left Tottenville and St. George.

The cab signaling system sounds an alarm inside the cab to control train speeds and automatically applies the brake if needed. Prior to the new system's implementation, there were no safeguards in place to prevent trains traveling at full speed after ignoring a signal and continuing past a bumping block. The new signal system required the installation of 30 miles (48 km) of underground fiber optic cable. The signals system limits the maximum speed at certain points and at sharp curves, and limits trains to 15 miles per hour (24 km/h) when approaching a terminal.

On July 17, 2006, rush-hour express service was sped up, with all morning express trains running non-stop from New Dorp to St. George. Evening express service started earlier under the new timetable. In response to record ridership growth on the SIR, rush-hour express service was expanded in late 2007. Evening service was expanded on November 14 when five additional express trains were added, expanding the span of express service by 80 minutes. Morning express service was expanded on December 5. The span of express service was extended by 45 minutes during the morning with the addition of three express trains. Express service was also added in the off-peak direction to Tottenville during the morning, with five express trips leaving St. George. Five local trains were also added to the schedule.

In May 2007, emergency call boxes and surveillance cameras were installed at Old Town to improve safety for riders waiting for trains. The cameras were linked by fiber optic cables to St. George station, where the footage was recorded. The $1.75 million project would install the systems at all stations by 2009, and was funded by former State Senator John Marchi and Councilman James Oddo. Work to consolidate the Nassau and Atlantic stations was expected to be completed in 2009 or 2010, and the R44 rolling stock was to be rehabilitated in 2008 before being replaced in 2014.

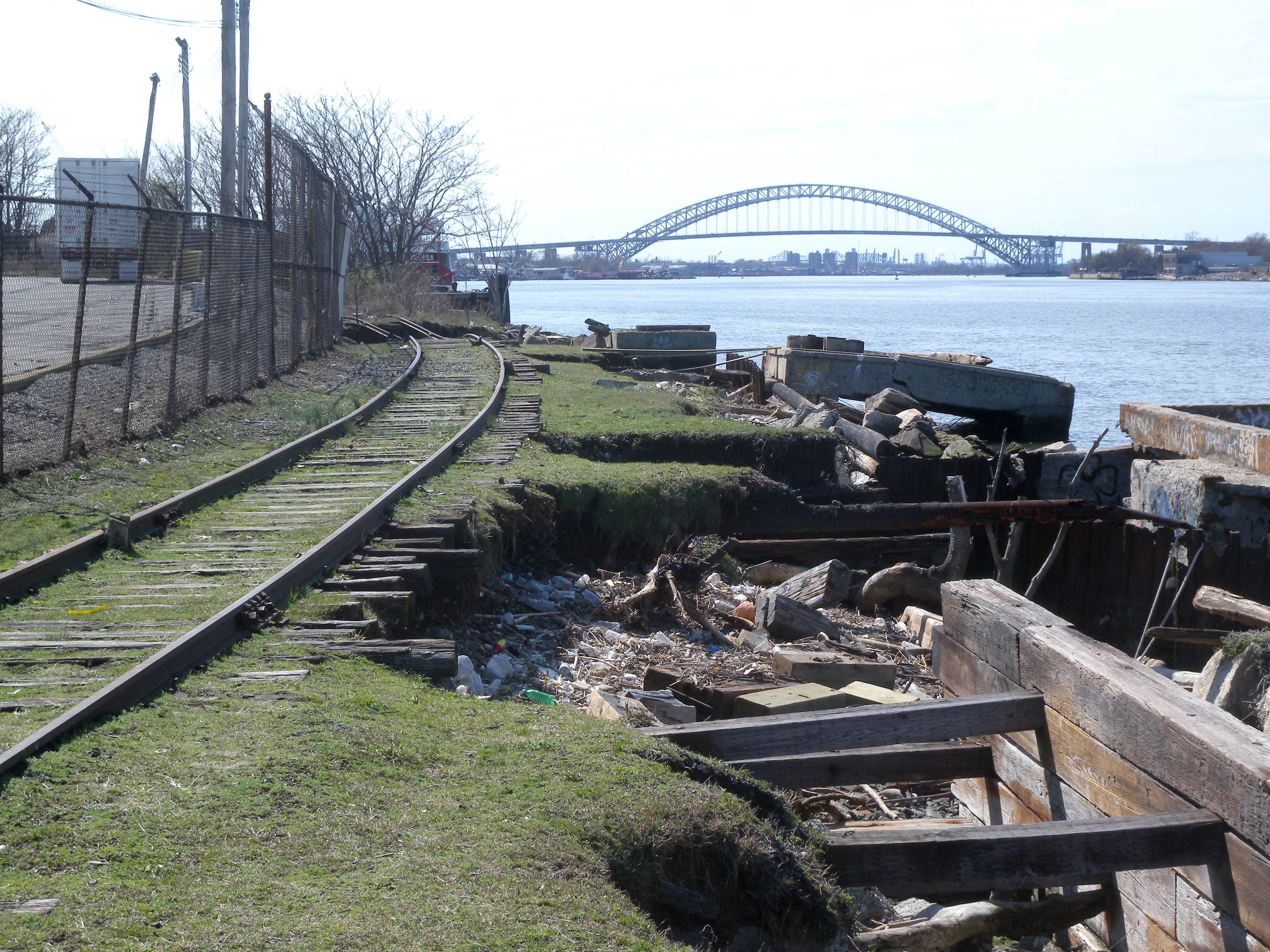
The right-of-way for the North Shore Branch still exists, but some portions of, such as the areas along the Kill van Kull, which can be seen in this picture, need extensive work to be done for it to be reactivated for heavy rail, light rail, or bus use.

A new stationhouse at Tompkinsville opened on January 20, 2010, with turnstiles installed for the first time. The stationhouse cost $6.9 million, and was equipped with low turnstiles and fare vending machines. The turnstiles were installed because passengers often avoided paying the fare by exiting at Tompkinsville and taking a short, 0.5-mile (800 m) walk to the St. George ferry terminal. It was estimated the SIR lost $3.4 million every year as a result. Trains heading to St. George during the morning rush hour, and trains leaving St. George in the evening rush hour had skipped Tompkinsville and Stapleton in an effort to reduce fare evasion. Service stopped at these stations every hour while all other rush hour trains bypassed them. After the installation of the turnstiles, the revenue generated at Tompkinsville made up 15% of the SIR's revenue. Schedules were changed, with locals and most non-rush hour trains stopping. In 2010, it was announced the MTA planned to restore fare collection on the entire line to raise more revenue and reduce crime. This was planned to be implemented once the MetroCard was replaced with a smartcard. In the interim, the MTA proposed installing turnstiles at Grasmere because it is a heavily used transfer point to the S53 bus to Brooklyn.

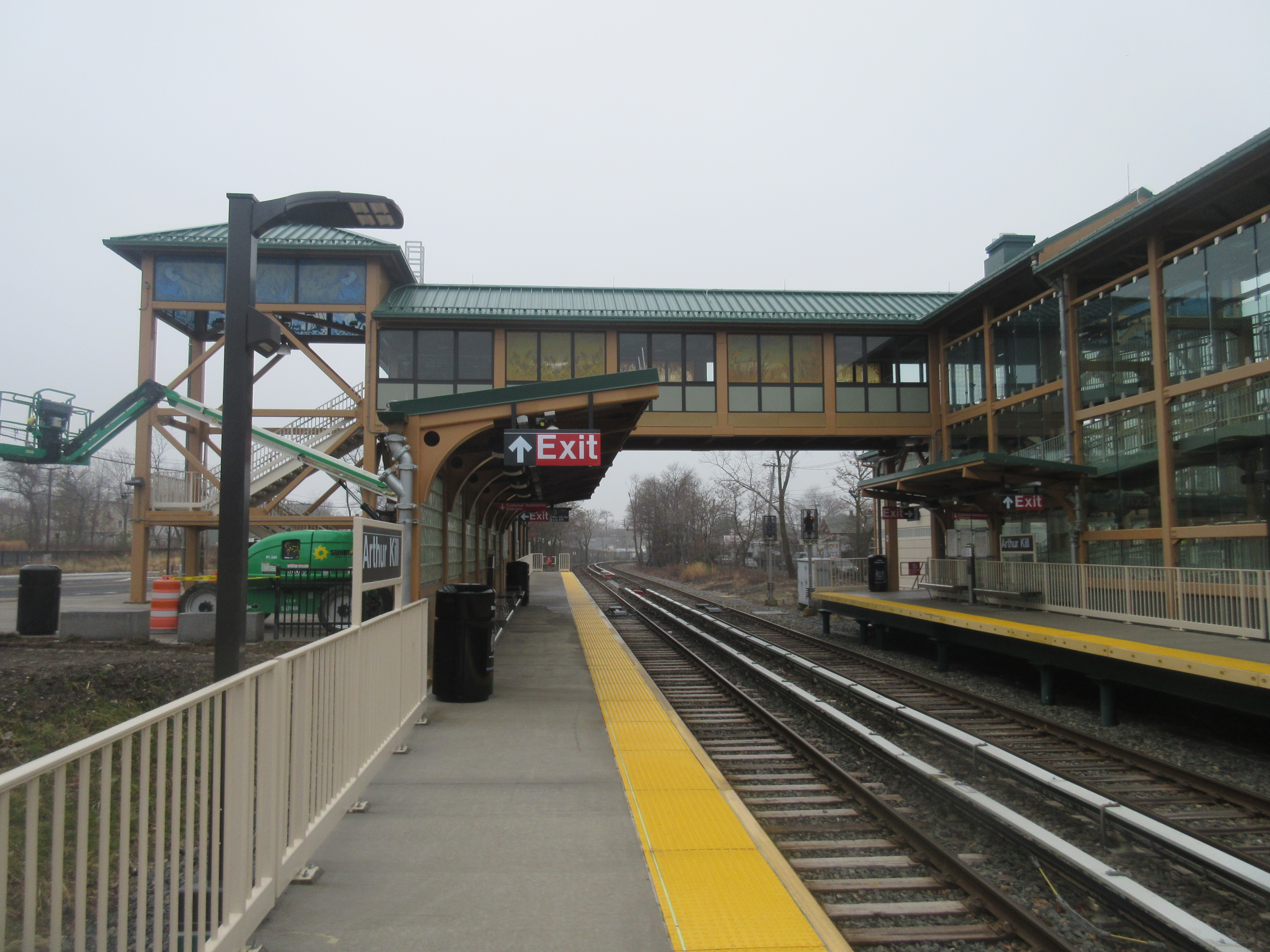
The Arthur Kill station opened in January 2017, replacing the Nassau and Atlantic stations. It was the first new station to open on the railway since the 1930s.

In a 2006 report, the Staten Island Advance explored the restoration of passenger services on 5.1-mile (8.2 km) of the North Shore Branch between St. George Ferry Terminal and Arlington station. Completion of the study is necessary to qualify the project for the estimated $360 million. A preliminary study found ridership could reach 15,000 daily. U.S. Senator Chuck Schumer from New York requested $4 million of federal funding for a detailed feasibility study. In 2012, the MTA released an analysis of transportation solutions for the North Shore, which included proposals for the reintroduction of heavy rail, light rail, or bus rapid transit using the North Shore line's right-of-way. Other options included transportation systems management, which would improve existing bus service, and the possibility of future ferry and water taxi services. Bus rapid transit was preferred for its cost and relative ease of implementation, which would require $352 million in capital investment. As of January 2018, the project has yet to receive funding.

On May 21, 2012, Grasmere station started to be rehabilitated. The construction included demolition and rebuilding of the station platform and station house. A temporary platform and entrance were built north of the main station. Construction was finished in April 2014.

A new, ADA-compliant station named Arthur Kill, near the southern terminus of the present line, opened on January 21, 2017, after numerous delays. The station is sited between Atlantic and Nassau stations, which it replaced. Atlantic and Nassau were in the poorest condition of all the stations on the line. Unlike the Atlantic and Nassau stations, Arthur Kill is able to platform a four-car train. The MTA has provided parking for 150 automobiles near the station. Ground was broken for the $15.3 million station on October 18, 2013. The contract for the project was awarded on July 31, 2013. The building of a station at Rosebank, which would bridge the gap between Grasmere and Clifton stations—the longest gap between stations on the line—has also been discussed. A Rosebank station once existed on the now-defunct South Beach Branch of the railway.

The 2015–2019 MTA Capital Plan called for the SIR's Richmond Valley station and 32 subway stations to undergo a complete overhaul as part of the Enhanced Station Initiative. Updates would include the addition of cellular service, Wi-Fi, USB charging stations, interactive service advisories and maps, improved signage, and improved station lighting. The capital plan also called for the reconstruction of the Clifton Yard, which had been damaged during Hurricane Sandy in 2012, as well as the addition of storm walls at St. George. The St. George flood walls were finished in mid-2017, while the Clifton Yard reconstruction was to be completed in 2021. In 2022, the MTA awarded a contract to install seven 150-foot (46 m) monopole antennas to replace the SIR's existing radio system.

In 2017, it was announced that the MetroCard would be phased out and replaced by OMNY, a contactless fare payment system also by Cubic, with fare payment being made using Apple Pay, Google Pay, debit/credit cards with near-field communication technology, or radio-frequency identification cards. The St. George and Tompkinsville stations, the only two Staten Island Railway stations with turnstiles, received OMNY readers in December 2019. MetroCard sales ended December 31, 2025.

== Decline and the rebirth of freight: 1971–present ==
=== Decline: 1971–2000 ===
Through a merger with the Chesapeake and Ohio Railway, the B&O became part of the larger Chessie System. The freight operation on the island was renamed the Staten Island Railroad Corporation (SIRC) in 1971, after being separated from the island's passenger service. In 1976, when the CNJ was absorbed into the federal government-controlled Conrail, the Chessie System became isolated from their properties in New Jersey and Staten Island. Most of their freight service, with the exception of one daily train to Cranford Junction, was truncated to Philadelphia. By 1973, the car ferry yard at Jersey City operated by the CNJ had shut down. Afterward, the car ferry operation at Saint George Yard was reopened; the New York Dock Railway took over the operation in September 1979, but closed it the following year.

Only a few isolated industries on Staten Island continued to rely on rail service for freight, effectively abandoning the Saint George Yard. On April 24, 1985, following a major decline in freight traffic, the Chessie System sold the SIRC to the New York, Susquehanna and Western Railway (NYS&W), a subsidiary of the Delaware Otsego Corporation (DO), for $1.5 million via a promissory note payable for ten years. The NYS&W began to serve the SIRC's ten remaining customers with the hopes of hiring more, and only five employees became assigned to the SIRC's operations. In October 1989, the NYS&W embargoed 4 miles (6,400 m) of trackage east of Elm Park on the North Shore Branch, ending rail freight traffic to Saint George. In 1990, the SIRC's primary customer, Procter & Gamble, closed, resulting in a further decline in freight traffic.

The Arthur Kill Vertical Lift Bridge was removed from service on June 25, 1991, and the SIRC's final train under NYS&W ownership subsequently operated on April 21, 1992. Afterwards, the North Shore Branch and the Arthur Kill Bridge were obtained by the Chessie's successor, CSX. In 1994, the railway and bridge were sold again to the New York City Economic Development Corporation (NYCEDC), whose purchase was followed by a decade of false starts. In 1998, Conrail was split up, and some portions of trackage formerly operated by the B&O's competitors were acquired by CSX. The railroad line from Cranford Junction to Arlington was still intact, by that time.

=== Reactivation and bridge renovations: 2000–present ===
During the early 2000s, the Port Authority of New York and New Jersey announced plans to reopen the Staten Island Railroad line in New Jersey. Since the Jersey Central became a New Jersey Transit line, a new junction would be built to the ex-Lehigh Valley Railroad line. Two rail tunnels from Brooklyn were planned—one to Staten Island and one to Greenville, New Jersey—and would allow freight to pass through New York on its way from New England to the South. In December 2004, a $72 million project to reactivate freight service on Staten Island and to repair the Arthur Kill Vertical Lift Bridge was announced by the NYCEDC and the Port Authority. Specific projects on the Arthur Kill Vertical Lift Bridge included repainting the steel superstructure and rehabilitating the lift mechanism. In June 2006, the freight line connection from New Jersey to the Staten Island Railroad was completed, and became operated in part by the Morristown and Erie Railway under contract with other companies and New Jersey.

The Arthur Kill Vertical Lift Bridge was renovated in 2006 and began regular service on April 2, 2007, or 16 years after it was closed. As part of the project, a portion of the North Shore Branch was rehabilitated, the Arlington Yard was expanded, and 6,500 feet (1,981 m) of new track was laid along the Travis Branch to Fresh Kills. Soon after service restarted on the line, Mayor Michael Bloomberg officially commemorated the reactivation on April 17, 2007. Service was provided by CSX Transportation, Norfolk Southern Railway, and Conrail over the Travis Branch to haul waste from the Staten Island Transfer Station at Fresh Kills and ship container freight from the Howland Hook Marine Terminal and other industrial businesses. Along the remainder of the North Shore Branch, there are still tracks and rail overpasses in some places.

== See also ==
- History of the Staten Island Railway
  - History of the Staten Island Railway (1836–1899)
  - History of the Staten Island Railway (1900–1970)
- History of the New York City Subway
