= History of the Staten Island Railway (1836–1899) =

The following outlines the History of the Staten Island Railway from 1836 to 1899. The Staten Island Railway (SIR), a rapid transit line in the New York City borough of Staten Island, was incorporated as the Staten Island Rail Road on August 2, 1851, following a failed proposal in 1836 to construct a line on the island. The railroad was financed with a loan from Cornelius Vanderbilt, and completed to Tottenville in 1860. After a period of success, the railroad went into foreclosure and was transferred to the Staten Island Railway Company in 1873. By 1880 the railway was barely operational, and Erastus Wiman, one of the island's most prominent residents, organized the Staten Island Rapid Transit Company (SIRT) that year. He partnered with the Baltimore & Ohio Railroad (B&O) to build a large rail terminal on the island and centralize the six-to-eight ferry landings. He secured an extension on a land-purchase option from George Law by offering to name it "St. George" after him.

Part of the North Shore Branch opened in 1884. The lighthouse just above Tompkinsville impeded the line's extension to St. George but, after the SIRT lobbied for an act of Congress, construction of a tunnel under the lighthouse began in 1885. The SIR was leased to the B&O for 99 years in 188; proceeds of the lease were used to complete the terminal at Saint George, pay for two miles of waterfront property, complete the Rapid Transit Railroad, build a bridge over the Kill Van Kull at Elizabethport, and build other terminal facilities. The remainder of the North Shore Branch, along with St. George Terminal, opened for service in 1886,. In 1888, the South Beach Branch opened for passenger service to Arrochar, and in 1893, the South Beach Branch was extended to a new terminal at South Beach. The new lines opened by the B&O were known as the Staten Island Rapid Transit Railway, and the original line (from Clifton to Tottenville) was called the Staten Island Railway.

In 1886, Congress passed a law authorizing the construction of a 500-foot (150 m) swing bridge over Arthur Kill, completed two years later. In 1889, construction began on the Baltimore and New York Railway—a 5.25-mile (8.45 km) line from Arthur Kill to the Jersey Central at Cranford, and was finished later in the year; the first train operated from St. George Terminal to Cranford Junction in 1890. When the Arthur Kill Bridge was completed, the United States War Department was unsuccessfully pressured by the Lehigh Valley and Pennsylvania Railroads to have the newly built bridge replaced with a bridge with a different design; according to the railroads, it was an obstruction to navigation of the large numbers of coal barges past Holland Hook on Arthur Kill.

== Prior efforts: 1836–1860 ==
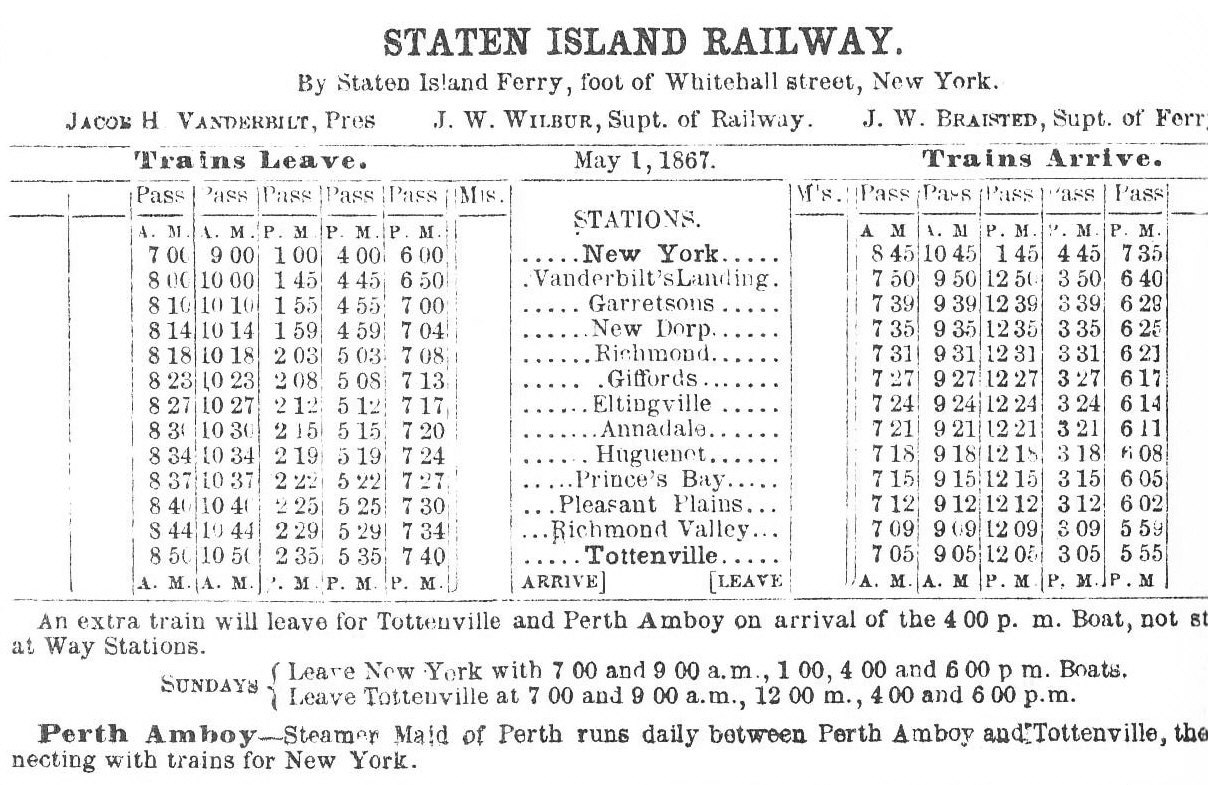
SIRT timetable, circa 1867

The railway's predecessor, the Staten Island Rail-Road Company, was incorporated on May 21, 1836. The charter called for the construction of a single or double-tracked line "commencing at some point in the town of Southfield, within one mile of the steamboat landing at the Quarantine, and terminating at some point in the town of Westfield; opposite Amboy." The proposed line would have run between the present-day locations of Clifton and Tottenville. The 13-mile (21 km) route had an estimated cost of $300,000. However, the company lost its charter in 1838 because the railroad was not built within two years after it was incorporated.

Attempts to start a rail line on the island were restarted in 1849 and 1850, when residents of Perth Amboy and Staten Island held meetings concerning a possible Tottenville-to-Stapleton line. Like the previous attempt in 1836, they faced financial difficulties, and sought out the help of William Vanderbilt—a son of Cornelius "Commodore" Vanderbilt and a resident of Staten Island. Vanderbilt had conceived of such a railroad as a way to reduce the monopoly of the Camden and Amboy Railroad, which was the only mean of reaching Philadelphia. Passengers would take ferries from New York City to Amboy, the railroad to Camden, and finally a ferry to Philadelphia. Vanderbilt thought his railroad would cut travel times—passengers would take a ferry from New York to Staten Island, then take his railroad, before taking a ferry to Amboy—and eliminate the monopoly of the Camden and Amboy between New York City and its terminus in Amboy. Since the plan conceived by the local residents followed Vanderbilt's proposed route, he helped charter the Staten Island Railroad Company (SIRR) on August 2, 1851, in order to build the rail line. The articles of association for the company were filed on October 18, 1851.

In 1852, the line was expected to cost $322,195. Two possible route options were considered; the first would start at New Ferry Dock in Stapleton, before passing through Rocky Hollow, following the valley between Castleton and Southfield Heights before descending to New Dorp. After going 4 miles (6.4 km) through the valley, the line would curve toward Amboy Road before curving southward, passing Billop House, and ending near Biddle's Grove and the Amboy ferries. The second route would start at Vanderbilt's Landing and run through Clifton to New Dorp.

The railroad's charter gave it two years to be built. Like the original plan for the line, however, difficulties were encountered. One problem was the acquisition of property for the line's right-of-way; many property owners refused to sell their land, blocking the proposed line. To prevent the loss of the line's charter, in 1853, the company successfully petitioned for a two-year extension to build the line. In 1853, a bill giving the company the right to operate ferries between New York and Staten Island was passed. Still facing difficulties, in January 1855 the company applied to the New York State Legislature for a three-year extension to complete the project. After all of the property required for the right-of-way was acquired, construction commenced in November 1855. The company, however, had run out of money to complete the line and asked Cornelius Vanderbilt—the sole Staten Island-to-Manhattan ferry operator—for a loan. Vanderbilt agreed to finance the railroad, but changed the northern terminal of the line from Stapleton to Vanderbilt's Landing, his ferry landing further east. Vanderbilt tried to stop competitors who had obtained a lease for the ferry at Vanderbilt's Landing before he could get a lease. He appointed James R. Robinson to build a structure to block his competitors, but on July 28, 1851, people tried to deconstruct the almost-finished structure and threatened to hurt Robinson if he tried to block them. In 1858, Cornelius's son William Vanderbilt was inducted onto the railroad's board of directors.

== Opening: 1860 ==
Stockholders and officials took an inaugural ride on the double-track line between Vanderbilt's Landing and Eltingville on February 1, 1860, and passenger operations began on April 23 that year. At Vanderbilt's Landing, passengers continued their passage to Manhattan by ferry. The first locomotive was named "Albert Journeay", after the railroad's president. A second locomotive was added to the line on May 5, 1860; it was named "E. Bancker" after the company's vice-president. The remainder of the line was expected to be completed in a month.

Over the next month, the remainder of the line was built between Annadale and Pleasant Plains as a single-track line, with a passing siding at Huguenot, passing through mosquito-infested land laced with peat bogs and quicksand—an area known locally as Skunk's Misery. It took a lot of time and wood to build the sub-roadbed with logs. It was viewed as unlikely to be a worthwhile investment to double-track the line because of the low passenger volume south of New Dorp. South of Pleasant Plains, the line was double-tracked. The line was extended to Annadale on May 14, 1860, and was completed to Tottenville on June 2, 1860, with a formal opening of the railroad. The completion of the line to Tottenville allowed passengers to transfer to a ferry that crossed the Arthur Kill and allowed passage to Perth Amboy, New Jersey. Initially, services made eleven stops between Vanderbilt's Landing and Tottenville. Many stations were named after nearby large farms, such as Garretson's and Gifford's. The stations built at Eltingville and Annadale—whose namesakes, the Eltings family and Anna Seguine, were influential in paying for the construction of the rail line—were the most elaborate. The arrival of the railroad gave dignity to some locations on Staten Island; "Poverty Hollow" was renamed Rosebank, Oakwood became Oakwood Heights, and other places were renamed with the coming of the railroad.

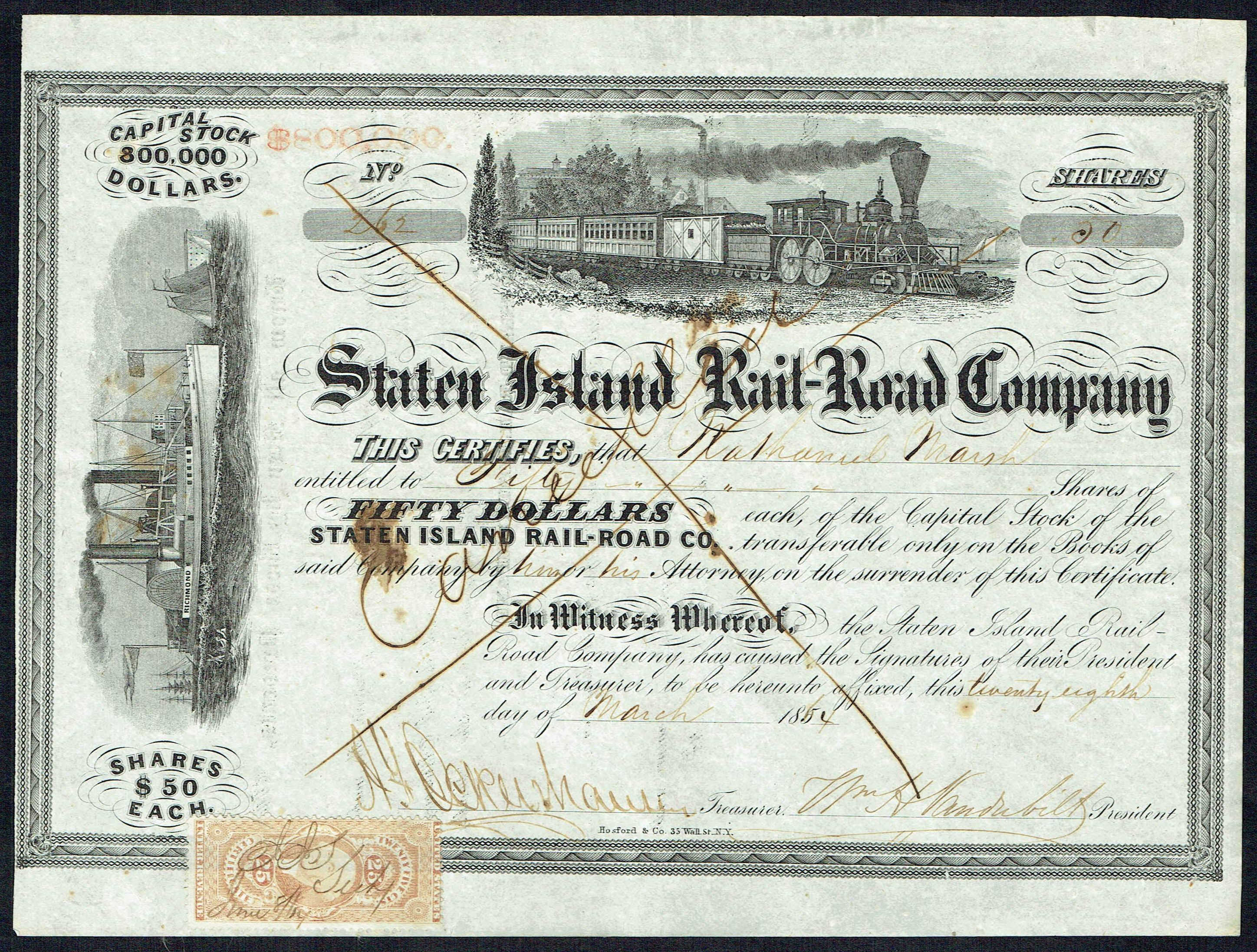
Share of the Staten Island Rail Road Company, issued 28. March 1864, signed by William Henry Vanderbilt as president

In August 1860, the railroad was extended from the depot at Vanderbilt's Landing to the wharf, which allowed passengers to walk directly to the boat from the train instead of walking 100 feet (30 m) along the sand. At the time, it took one and a half hours to get to Tottenville from Manhattan. Patronage of the rail line exceeded the greatest expectations of its projectors. On February 27, 1861, the New Jersey Locomotive Works gave notice of foreclosure on the two locomotives; Cornelius Vanderbilt interceded again and on September 4, 1861, the SIRR was placed into receivership with William Vanderbilt to prevent the loss of the locomotives and rolling stock to creditors. The Vanderbilts had taken stock in the railroad but in 1863, William Vanderbilt managed the receivership well enough for it to be discharged, with the debt paid off. As a result, the railroad became property of the Vanderbilts; facilities were enlarged under their leadership—an expansion made possible by increasing the capital stock to $800,000 from $350,000.

On October 5, 1861, in what might have been the first major accident on the railroad, Mary Austin, age 16, was killed by a train at Princess Bay as she crossed the tracks.

== Ferry conflicts: 1860–1884 ==
Ferry service between Perth Amboy and Tottenville began in 1863, operated by the SIRR. It was necessary to have a direct connection between the trains and the infrequent ferries to and from Manhattan, but this was difficult during the beginning of operation. The ferries serving Vanderbilt's Landing were owned by the attorney George Law. Vanderbilt tried to operate a ferry service between Manhattan and Staten Island that would compete with Law's. He also started construction on a central dock on the island, but he abandoned the scheme after a storm destroyed the timber work. Only the large stone foundation remained; it was still visible at low tide in 1900.

Vanderbilt was eventually forced to sell his ferry service to Law after a franchise battle. After the battle, Vanderbilt lost interest in transit operations on Staten Island and he handed the ferry and railroad operations to his brother Jacob H. Vanderbilt, who was the president of the company until 1883. In March 1864, William Vanderbilt bought Law's ferries, bringing both the railroad and the ferries under the same company. In 1865, the railroad took over operation of the New York & Richmond Ferry Company, and would later assume direct responsibility for operating the ferry service to Manhattan. The Perth Amboy and Staten Island ferries were taken over by the railroad under the leadership of Jacob Vanderbilt, who increased service.

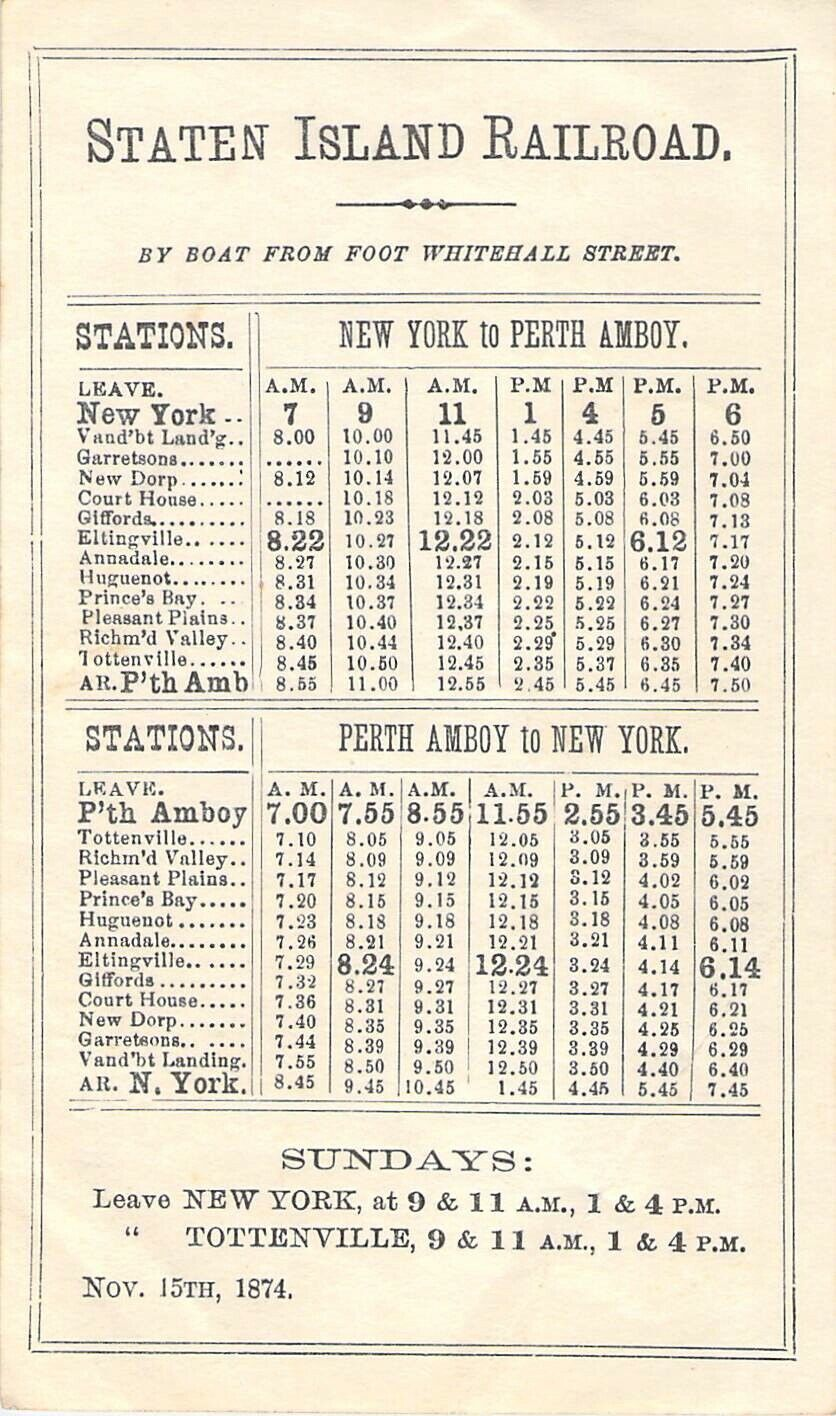
1874 timetable

The SIRR and its ferry line were making a modest profit until the boiler of the ferry "Westfield" exploded at Whitehall Street Terminal on July 30, 1871, killing 85 and injuring hundreds. As president of the railway, Jacob Vanderbilt was arrested but was not charged. As a result of the disaster, on March 28, 1872, the railroad and the ferry went into receivership. On September 17, 1872, the property of the company was sold to George Law in foreclosure, with the exception of the ferry "Westfield", which was purchased by Horace Theall. Some time after, Law and Theall sold the SIRR and ferry to the Staten Island Railway Company (SIRW). Law had threatened to form a company of his own if the stockholders did not come to his terms promptly, but a deal was reached. The charter for the SIRW was created on March 20, 1873, and on April 1, 1873, Law transferred the SIRR's property to the SIRW for $480,000. The ferry operation was transferred to the newly formed Staten Island Railway Ferry Company. The ferry and rail services were split into separate rail companies to prevent problems with one from leading to the demise of the other, while ensuring that connecting service could still be provided for passengers.

During the American Civil War, a boat connected with the SIRW, the "Southfield", was sold to the government and converted into a gunboat; it was destroyed during an attack on Mississippi. In 1876, competition to the SIRW's ferry system emerged: Commodore Garner obtained possession of a ferry and ran the "D. R. Martin" on the East Shore. However, this ferry service was suddenly ended when Garner died. His boats were purchased by John Starin, who paid $5,000 for each of them, and obtained a franchise. He operated it until it was taken over by the Staten Island Rapid Transit Railroad Company (SIRTR) on August 1, 1884.

== SIRT/B&O operation: 1880–1900 ==
=== Organization: 1880–1884 ===
By 1880, the SIRW was barely operational, and as a result New York State Attorney General Hamilton Ward sued to have the company dissolved in May that year. The suit said the company had become "insolvent in September 1872, to have then surrendered its rights to others, and have failed to exercise those rights". The legal proceedings commenced after an injunction was obtained that restrained the creditors of the railway company from proceeding against it until after the suit of the people was determined. Although it was floundering, the railway become the centerpiece of a plan to develop the island by a Canadian, Erastus Wiman. In 1867, Wiman arrived in New York to oversee the main office of Dun, Barlow, and Company in New York. Wiman became one of the most prominent residents of Staten Island after moving into a mansion there. He was dubbed the "Duke of Staten Island," and was interested in developing the island; Wiman recognized that to succeed he would need to build a coordinated transportation hub with connections to New York City and New Jersey. To this end the Staten Island Rapid Transit Railroad Company (SIRTR) was organized on March 25, 1880 and incorporated on April 14, 1880.

Wiman's plan called for a system encircling the island using two miles of the SIRW between Vanderbilt's Landing and Tompkinsville. His plan also called for the centralization of all ferries from one terminal, replacing the six to eight terminals active near what is now St. George. Wiman approached Robert Garrett, president of the Baltimore & Ohio Railroad (B&O), to back the plan, and Garrett agreed. The SIRTR began to seek legislation to acquire various rights-of-way needed to implement Wiman's plan. At that time, Wiman's company neither owned nor controlled a railroad; If it gained a charter to build connections, it would have had nothing to connect to. The SIRTR then began surveying for the proposed routes; in April 1881, it acquired 1.5 miles (2.4 km) of critical right-of-way directly from George Law. When Wiman explained his plan he secured a waterfront option from Law; however, Law refused to renew the option when it expired. To persuade Law to renew it, Wiman offered to name the place "St. George." Law was amused by the gesture and granted Wiman the option. In October 1882, Wiman made an application for a wharf to land passengers from the SIRTR's planned new ferry service to Manhattan.

Clarence T. Barrett, Henry P. Judah, and Theodore C. Vermilyen were appointed as commissioners to appraise the value of the land required by the SIRTR to extend the Staten Island Railway from Vanderbilt's Landing to Tompkinsville. Work on the line was delayed until the commissioners reported. The SIRTR filed a map of the proposed route at the office of the clerk of Richmond County. The line as planned would cross the lawn of Ms. Post on the North Shore of the island; on February 26, 1883, Mr. Franklin Bartlett and Mr. Clifford Bartlett, on behalf of Ms. Post, notified the court a change of route would be demanded. (Note: After leaving Vanderbilt's Landing, the newly proposed line crossed the property formerly occupied by the Seaman's Retreat; by then acquired for the state by the Marine Society. It would then traverse the property of the New York Coast Wrecking Company; the lumber yards of C. C. Eddy & Sons; the carriage factory of J. Scott; the Schaeffer grounds; property represented by Coudert brothers; the grounds of George Bechtel; Rubsnin & Horrman, the brewers; S. L. Mulford & Co.'s coal and wood yard, and lands of Samuel Barton and W. Butler Duncan. Apart from Scott's carriage factory, the only other building upon the line was a small barn on the Schaeffer grounds. The cost of the extension was estimated to be $150,000.)

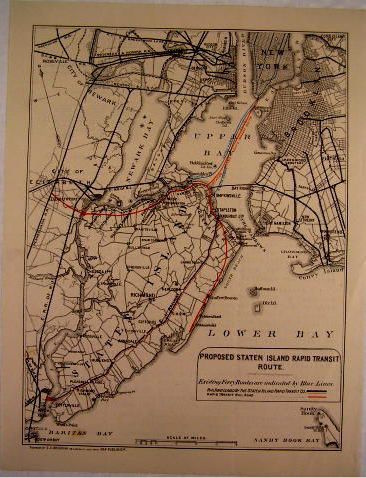
Proposed Staten Island Transit route map. "Existing Ferry Routes are indicated by blue lines." Issued c. 1884 by E.C. Bridgman, NY, Map Publisher.

On April 3, 1883, the SIRTR gained control of the SIRW and its boats. On the same date, at the annual meeting of the SIRW, Erasmus Wiman gained control of the railway by being elected to the board of Directors of the Railroad and becoming the railway's president. At the meeting, Wiman laid out his proposals for rail lines on Staten Island. He proposed extending the Staten Island Railway line to Hyatt Street in what is today Saint George. From there, a line would run through New Brighton and Snug Harbor along the island's North Shore. The line would then go inland, running parallel to the Kill Van Kull. Additional spur lines would have been built in the interior of the island based on where people settled. Wiman also proposed a bridge across Arthur Kill from Tottenville to Perth Amboy, replacing the ferry that operated there. This would have been part of a direct route between New York City and Philadelphia via Perth Amboy and South Amboy, with a new bridge over the Raritan River. In the days before the meeting, Wiman had gained 7,450 out of the 11,800 shareholders to elect him, surprising many of the directors of the railroad. By the end of the month, Wiman resigned from the SIRTR to avoid any conflict of interest. On June 27, 1883, a meeting of the directors of the SIRW and the SIRTR formally ratified the merger of the two companies under the leadership of Erastus Wiman, who was named president. On June 30, 1883, the SIRTR leased the SIRW for a term of 99 years, to become effective when the line opened between Clifton and Tompkinsville. The line between Vanderbilt's Landing and Tottenville continued to be operated by the SIRW.

While the control of the railroad included control of Vanderbilt's ferry, the North Shore Ferry was leased separately and was operated by Starin, whose lease was set to expire on May 1, 1884. On July 18, 1884, the SIRTR outbid Starin for the North Shore operation. As part of the purchase, ferry service would have been operated every forty minutes instead of every hour. The fare for the railroad and the ferry would have been ten cents, except between five and seven in the morning and evening, when it would have been seven cents. Starin continued to fight the lease in the courts for several years.

On May 5, 1885, the Perth Amboy Railroad was incorporated in New York to build a 2-mile-long (3.2 km) line connecting the SIRW in Tottenville to Perth Amboy in New Jersey by bridging over the Arthur Kill. The railroad was incorporated with a capital stock of $1 million. This railroad line was never built, and was possibly in interest of the Pennsylvania Railroad. The Perth Amboy Railroad was to be an alternate freight route to avoid congestion at Harsimus Cove and through Elizabeth.

=== Expansion: 1884–1900 ===
A controlling interest in the SIRTR was obtained by the B&O in November 1885 through purchases of stock. On November 21, 1885, Robert Garrett, President of the B&O, leased the SIRTR to the B&O for 99 years, which gave the B&O access to New York, allowing it to compete with the Pennsylvania Railroad (PRR). Wiman needed the proceeds of the sale to pay for the construction of the North Shore Branch. The funds also helped pay for the construction of a bridge over the Kill Van Kull, the acquisition of 2 miles (3.2 km) of waterfront property, and for terminal facilities at St. George. In 1885, Jacob Vanderbilt retired as President of the SIRW. The new lines opened by the B&O were operated by the SIRTR, while the original line from Clifton to Tottenville was called the SIRW, which was maintained as a separate corporation. The passenger cars used by the SIRW were leased by the SIRTR.

Construction of the North Shore Branch began on March 17, 1884, after a number of legal proceedings; a party of surveyors started marking out the grades and broke ground for the roadbed. The rights of a horse car line to operate in Richmond Terrace were bought to build the line; the right of way followed the island's North Shore and reached a ferry to Elizabeth, New Jersey that had been operating since the mid-1700s. The B&O built about 2 miles (3.2 km) of rock fill out from shore and along the Kill Van Kull to deal with opposition from property owners in the neighborhood of Sailors' Snug Harbor, costing an additional $25,000. The company underwent a contest in litigation to acquire property for the line to pass over the cove at Palmer's run. Some properties in Port Richmond were acquired, displacing several home and business owners. A farm on the northwestern corner of Staten Island at Old Place—which was renamed Arlington by the B&O—was also purchased.

Grading work on the section between Clifton (previously Vanderbilt's Landing) and Tompkinsville began at this time, and during early 1884, construction continued with such energy that this section, which had been expected to open on September 1, opened on July 31 that year. The first train on the section contained the managers and officers, a few invited guests, and several passengers who had boarded prior to the train's arrival at Tompkinsville. The ride took three and a half minutes. The extension opened for passenger service on August 1, 1884. The opening of the line made the SIRTR's 99-year lease of the SIRW effective; under this agreement, the railroad to Tottenville and its properties became part of the rapid transit system.

Wiman wanted to extend the line to St. George so all of the branches under the company's control could meet in one place and connect with the ferries to Manhattan. Most of the course of the line, however, had followed the shore along the bluffs, where ground had to be made upon to build the road. State laws could not grant the right to run a railroad through the property of the United States, hindering construction by the grounds of the lighthouse department near Tompkinsville. The company secured an Act of Congress permitting them to tunnel through a hill near the shore. The grant for the tunnel was surrounded with restrictions that slowed progress. Construction of the tunnel began in 1885; it was 585 feet (178 m) long, and was protected by massive masonry walls on the sides and a brick-built arch 2 feet (0.61 m) in thickness overhead. The tunnel was wide enough to fit two trains side by side at a time. The cost of the project was $190,000. On November 16, 1884, Wiman, James M. Davis, Sir Roderick Cameron, Herman Clark, and Louis de Jonge incorporated the Saint George Improvement Company to handle the land and waterfront, which had been recently purchased from the estate of George Law. The new company was to handle the building of a new ferry terminal at Saint George.

==== Opening of the North Shore and South Beach Branches ====
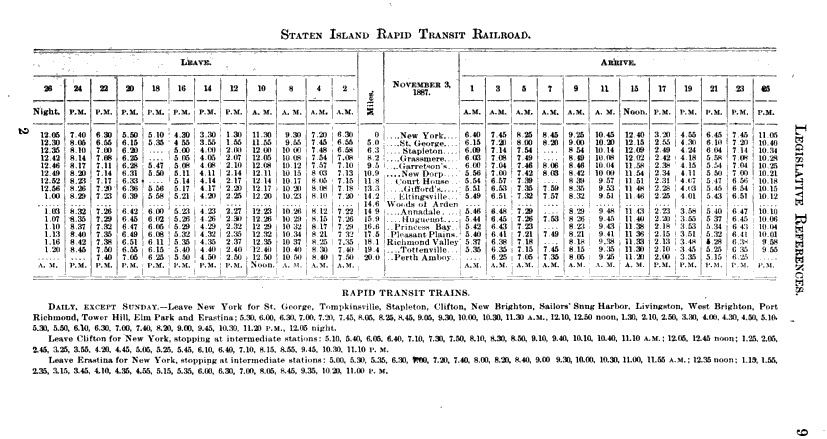
November 3, 1887 Staten Island Rapid Transit Railroad Timetable

On January 16, 1886, constructing engineers for the SIRTR said that if weather continued to be good, trains on the East Shore Branch from Clifton and North Shore Branch trains from Elm Park would be able to run to St. George Terminal by February 1.

The North Shore Branch was completed in 1885 and opened for service on February 23, 1886, with trains terminating at Elm Park. Travel times between Manhattan and Elm Park were reduced from 90 minutes with the old ferry system to 39 minutes. On March 7, 1886, the key piece of Wiman's plan, the St. George Terminal, opened; North Shore trains operated between Elm Park and St. George, and East Shore trains operated between St. George and Tottenville. In early 1886, in anticipation of the opening of the terminal and the consolidation of operations, the former Staten Island Railway stations from Clifton to Tottenville were upgraded from low-level platforms to high-level platforms to match the platforms on the new lines. In mid-1886, the North Shore Branch opened its new terminal at Erastina Place. In 1889–1890, a station was built at the South Avenue grade crossing at Arlington as the tracks were extended to the Arthur Kill Bridge. At Arlington, trains were reversed for their trip back to St. George. Even a few years after its opening, most trains terminated at Erastina.

A 1.7-mile-long (2.7 km) branch, then known as the Arrochar Branch, was opened to Arrochar on January 1, 1888, as a double-tracked line. The branch split off at Clifton Junction; it had two stops—Fort Wadsworth and Arrochar. In its first year, the branch carried heavy traffic, especially during the summer months. As evidenced by a map from 1884, the South Beach Branch was originally intended to run to Prominard Street in Oakwood Beach. The extension, however, was not built because the SIRTR could not gain the Vanderbilt family's approval to cross their New Dorp Beach farm. Instead, the line was only built as far as South Beach. During fiscal year 1893, the SIRTR purchased land to extend the line 1.75 miles (2.82 km) to South Beach and the 2.3-mile (3.7 km) South Beach Branch was completed in 1894.

==== Improvements on the line to Tottenville ====
In 1886, Grasmere station opened on the Tottenville Line for a cost of $555.35.

To improve service, under B&O control, a large portion of the line was double-tracked. A second track was built between New Dorp and a point near Clifton in 1887 and 1888. Two new stations, Garretson and New Dorp, were opened the following year. In 1893, to pay for more improvements—including double-tracking and a new station at Tottenville—the SIRW issued a mortgage. In 1895, land in St. George and Stapleton was acquired for yard space and station use. Between June 1895 and December 1895, the line was double tracked to Annadale. Between 1896 and 1899, the portion of the 12.64-mile (20.34 km) line that was double tracked was increased from 5.8 miles (9.3 km) to 10.04 miles (16.16 km).

In 1896, the terminal at Tottenville was moved 600 feet (180 m) to provide closer connections to the Perth Amboy Ferry and to provide new ferry slips. The terminal had been located on the east side of Main Street but as part of the work it was moved to Bentley Street. The change had a negative effect on local businesses, changing the character of Main Street and marking a decline of its commercial viability. To build the new terminal, property had to be acquired. In 1910, the SIRW stopped using the land for the old ferry docks at Main Street.

==== Extension to New Jersey ====
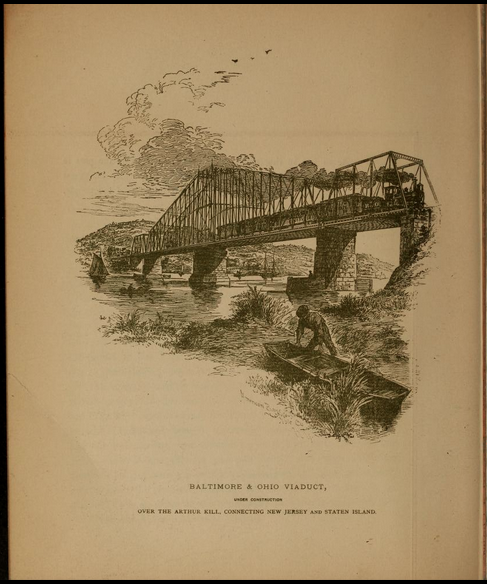
Baltimore & Ohio Viaduct Under Construction Over the Arthur Kill Connecting Staten Island and New Jersey

The B&O made various proposals for a railroad between Staten Island and New Jersey. The accepted plan consisted of a 5.25 miles (8.45 km)-long section from the Arthur Kill to meet the Jersey Central at Cranford, through Roselle Park and Linden in Union County. In October 1888, the B&O created the subsidiary Baltimore and New York Railway (B&NY) to build the line, which was to be operated by the SIRTR. Construction started in 1889 and the line was finished later that year. After three years of effort by Wiman, Congress passed a bill on June 16, 1886, authorizing the construction of a 500-foot (150 m) swing bridge over the Arthur Kill. The start of construction was delayed for nine months because it awaited approval of the Secretary of War, and another six months due to an injunction from the State of New Jersey. Construction had to continue through the brutal winter of 1888 because Congress had set a completion deadline of June 16, 1888; two years after signing the bill. The bridge was completed three days early on June 13, 1888.

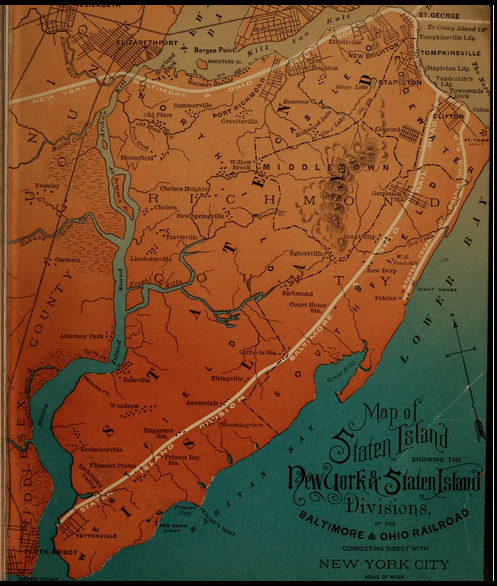
A Map of the Staten Island Rapid Transit Company from 1885

When it opened, the Arthur Kill Bridge was the largest drawbridge ever constructed; it cost $450,000 and was constructed without fatalities. The bridge consisted of five pieces of masonry, the center one being midstream with the draw resting on it. The bridge's drawspan was 500 feet (150 m), the fixed spans were 150 feet (46 m), and there were clear waterways of 208 feet (63 m) on either side of the draw, making the bridge 800 feet (240 m) wide. The bridge was 30 feet (9.1 m) above the low water mark. Construction of the draw needed 656 tons of iron, and 85 tons were needed for each of the approaches. Trains were planned to start running on the bridge by September 1, but because the approaches were not finished, this was delayed until January 1, 1890, when the first train from St. George to Cranford Junction crossed the bridge. Because the land for the approaches was low and swampy, 2 miles (3.2 km) of elevated structure was built; 6,000 feet (1,800 m) on Staten Island and 4,000 feet (1,200 m) in New Jersey. The North Shore Branch was opened to freight traffic on March 1, 1890. On July 1, 1890, all of the B&O's freight traffic started using the line. Freight service began running through from Baltimore to St. George, running via the Reading Railroad and the Central Railroad of New Jersey between Park Junction in Philadelphia and Cranford Junction in New Jersey.

The B&O paid the SIRTR 10 cents-per-ton trackage to use the line from Arthur Kill to St. George. Once the Arthur Kill Bridge was completed, pressure was brought upon the United States War Department by the Lehigh Valley Railroad and the PRR to have the newly built bridge torn down and replaced with a bridge with a different design, claiming it was an obstruction for the navigation of coal barges past Holland Hook on the Arthur Kill. Their efforts were not successful.

In September 1890, Wiman secured the rights for a tunnel between Brooklyn and Staten Island; these tunnel rights were acquired by the New Jersey and Staten Island Junction Railroad Company. In May 1900, the PRR and other railroads secured an informal agreement to use the North Shore Branch from the Arthur Kill Bridge and the tunnel rights for a tunnel to 39th Street in Brooklyn. This was intended to allow freight trains to travel directly between Boston and Washington.

==== Reorganization ====
The B&O was bankrupt by February 1896; in its attempt to reach the New York market, its western lines fell into disrepair. J.P. Morgan replaced the railroad's top management and refinanced it. The new terminal at St. George was completed in 1896 after work was contracted for the project in fiscal year 1893. The building was designed by the architects Carrere and Hastings, and was built with ironwork framing. At the time, it was the largest terminal in the United States to have ferry, rail, vehicular, pedestrian and trolley services. Trolley companies on Staten Island insisted on access to the new terminal, but were rebuffed by the B&O. The issue went to court, and the B&O ended up splitting the cost for the trolley terminal and the long viaduct with the trolley operators. Prior to October 1897 passengers placed their tickets into ticket choppers at stations to pay their fare. Afterwards, conductors collected tickets.

In 1892, trolley service was inaugurated on Staten Island; it attracted passengers from the SIRTR, ending the railroad's monopoly. As a result, the railroad went into bankruptcy. On April 20, 1899, the railroad company and all of the real and personal property held in the company was sold at auction for $2,000,000 to representatives of the B&O. The railroad already owned the line from Elizabethport, New Jersey to South Beach, including the Arthur Kill Bridge. At the time, it was rumored the B&O trains would be rerouted from Communipaw station to Saint George. There was no change in the SIRTRC's management after the purchase. On July 1, 1899, the SIRTR defaulted on its payment of interest on its second mortgage bonds, and its lease of the Staten Island Railway ended on July 14 when it was put into receivership. On July 31, 1899, the Staten Island Rapid Transit Railway Company—also shortened to Staten Island Rapid Transit, or SIRT–was incorporated for the purpose of operating the SIRTR, with the transaction taking place on August 1, 1899. The section of the SIRT's line between St. George and Clifton Junction was jointly operated with the SIRW.

== See also ==
- History of the Staten Island Railway
  - History of the Staten Island Railway (1900–1970)
  - History of the Staten Island Railway (1971–present)
- History of the New York City Subway
