= Travis Branch =

Railroad branch in Staten Island, New York

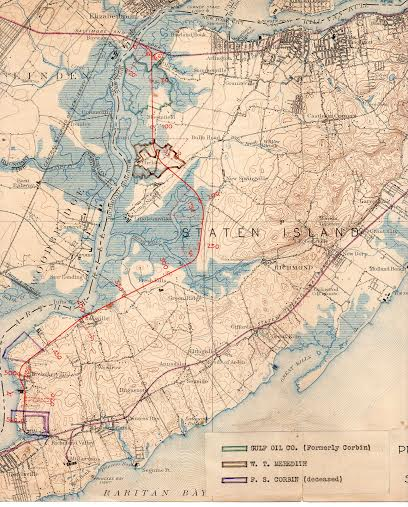
- This map from 1922 shows the proposed connected West Shore Line.

Overview
- Owner: Conrail Shared Assets
- Locale: Staten Island, New York, USA
- Termini: Arlington Yard; Fresh Kills Staten Island Transfer Station

Service
- Type: Rail freight transport
- System: Staten Island Railway
- Operator(s): Conrail Shared Assets

History
- Opened: 1928

Technical
- Number of tracks: 1-2
- Track gauge: 4 ft 8 1/2 in (1,435 mm)

The Travis Branch is a branch of the Staten Island Railway in New York City, that operates from Arlington Yard to Fresh Kills, which is used for freight transportation along the West Shore, Staten Island.

== History ==
The Gulf Oil Corporation opened a dock and tank farm along the Arthur Kill in 1928 and in order to serve it, the Travis Branch was built south from Arlington Yard into the marshes of the island's western shore to Gulfport. The small yard on the refinery property had a capacity for 150 tank cars. The Baltimore and Ohio Railroad (B&O) built wood trestles to carry the track over the many creeks that dissect the right-of-way to Travis. The branch was never electrified.

At this time, the two West Shore branches were mapped to be joined together by the B&O. The West Shore Line between Arlington and Tottenville, would have allowed rail freight headed to Nassau Smelting and other freight customers on the Main Line to avoid the congestion of Saint George Yard and the frequent passenger train service on the North Shore, South Beach and Perth Amboy sub-divisions. This proposal was killed by the Great Depression.

In 1958, the line was extended to Travis in order to serve the newly built Consolidated Edison power plant. It carried 100 car B&O unit trains of coal from West Virginia to the plant. The wood trestle over Old Place Creek (40°37′40″N 74°11′6″W) was replaced in 1966 with a steel-deck girder bridge. The branch was mostly a single track line all the way to South Avenue.

In the early 1980s, the power plant changed to coal delivery by barge. The branch was then abandoned and used for rolling-stock storage. A six-track former coal yard at the end of the branch once held coal hoppers. Whitchomb center-cab diesel No. 9 and three multiple-unit electric cars were being stored in the year for the Trolley Museum of New York. In 1990, the Whitcomb diesel and two of the cars were moved to the trolley museum's new home in Kingston, New York. ME-1 Car No. 353, deemed too damaged to move, remained a resident of Travis Yard until 2003, when it was scrapped in the revitalization of Travis Yard.

=== Current uses ===
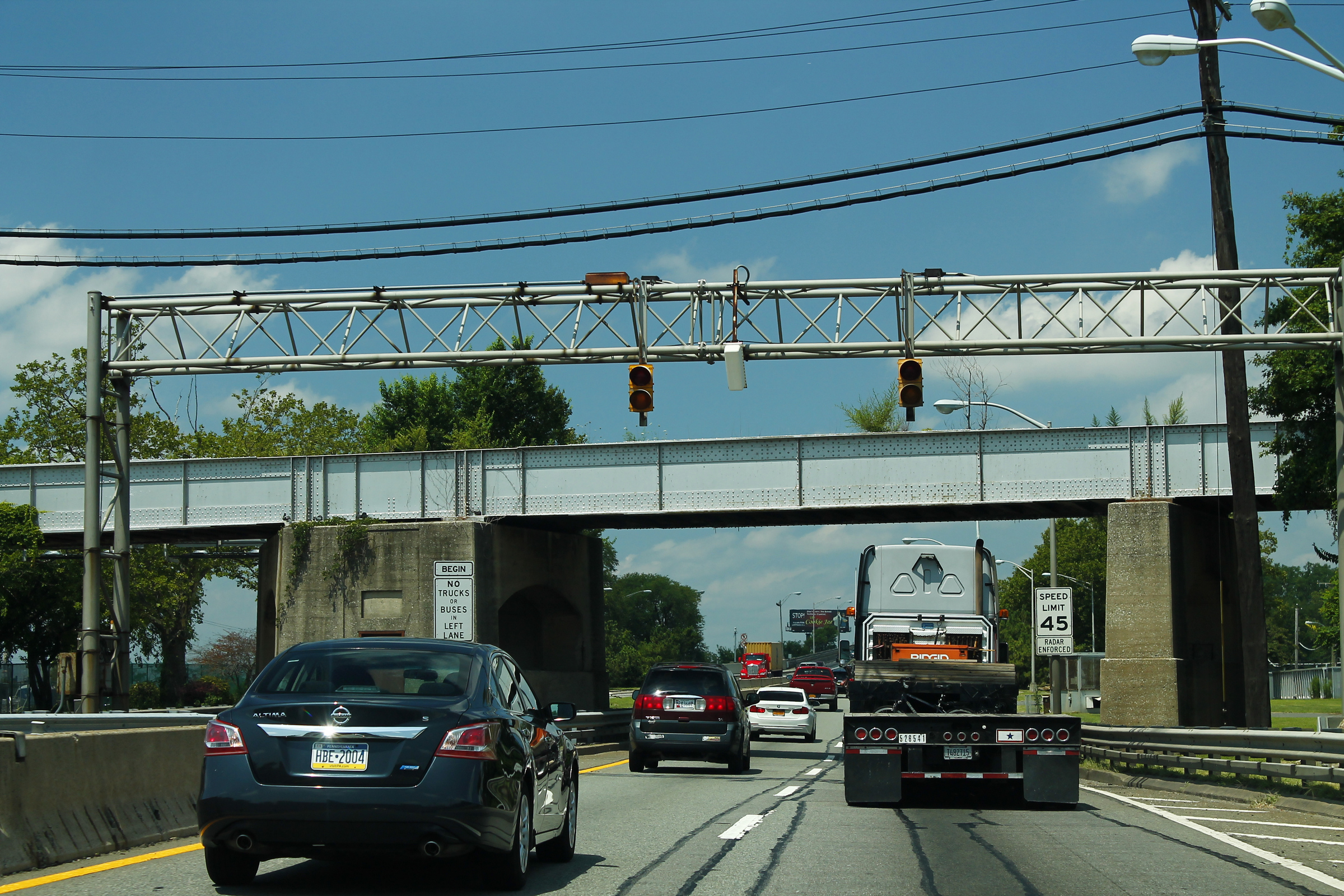
The Staten Island Expressway runs beneath the Travis Branch before crossing the Goethals Bridge in 2013.

In 2005, the Travis Branch was renovated and was extended from the old Consolidated Edison plant to the New York Sanitation Fresh Kills Landfill. Prior to reactivation in 2007, all the trestles on the branch were replaced with robust concrete bridges. Pratt Industries, a manufacturer of cardboard, has access to the railroad for shipments but has yet to use it. A new yard was built at Fresh Kills to serve the trash-transfer station there. The track along the branch was relaid along with the track extension, totalling to 6,500 feet (1,981 m) of new track. Regular service to the facility began in April 2007. Unit trains made up of bright orange container flatcars serve the facility–sometimes up to five times daily. The line is part of Conrail Shared Assets territory, and both CSX and NS locomotives operate on the line. A wye was added between the North Shore Line and the Travis Branch. The portion of the line connecting the line to the east end of Arlington Yard is called the Travis Lead.

Soon after service restarted on the line, Mayor Michael Bloomberg officially commemorated the reactivation on April 17, 2007. On behalf of the City of New York, the New York City Economic Development Corporation formed an agreement with CSX Transportation, Norfolk Southern Railway, and Conrail Shared Assets Operations to provide service over the reactivated line to haul waste from the Staten Island Transfer Station and ship container freight from the Howland Hook Marine Terminal and other industrial businesses. The Travis Branch has a length of 4.41 miles, with milepost 0.00 being Arlington Yard.

A proposed route alignment for light rail on the west shore of Staten Island would have the light rail go on the North Shore rail right-of-way to the Travis branch of the line, and from there, onto the median of the West Shore Expressway.

== Station list ==
Miles	Name	Opened	Closed	Notes
0.0	Arlington Yard	1886		
	Gulfport	1930s		Used to serve the nearby Gulf Oil refinery
	Travis	1957		served the Consolidated Edison power plant
4.41	Fresh Kills	2007		Used to serve the New York Sanitation Dump at Fresh Kills
