= Seismicity of the New York City area =

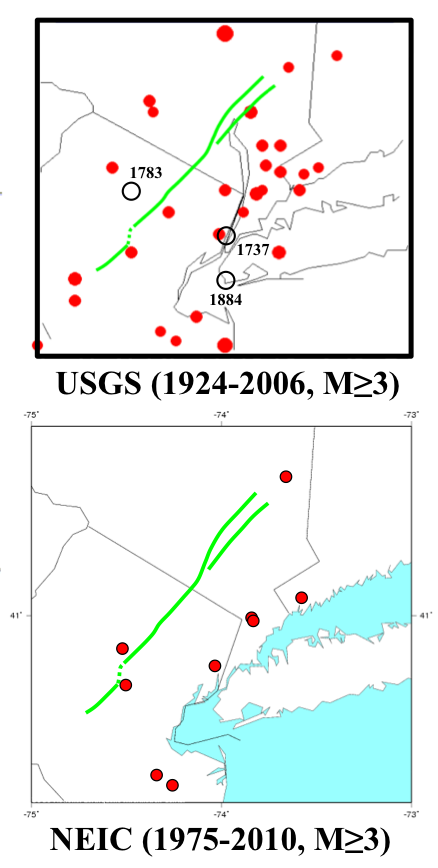
Seismicity in New York City area. Data from U.S. Geological Survey (Top, USGS) and National Earthquake Information Center (Bottom, NEIC). In top figure, closed red circles show 1924–2006 epicenters. Open black circles show larger earthquakes of 1737, 1783 and 1884. Green lines are the Ramapo fault.

Seismicity of the New York City area is relatively low. New York is less seismically active than California because it is far from any plate boundaries. Large and damaging intraplate earthquakes are relatively rare. When they do occur in the Northeastern United States, the areas affected by them are much larger than for earthquakes of similar magnitude on the West Coast of the United States. The largest known earthquake in the greater New York City area occurred in 1884, probably somewhere between Brooklyn and Sandy Hook, and had a magnitude of approximately 5. The New York quakes in 2023 and 2024 were shallow quakes.

== Earthquake risk ==
Earthquake risk assessments are based on factors like proximity to a fault line, population density and risk to infrastructure. The dense population and infrastructure mean that an earthquake of 5 or greater magnitude could do significant damage to New York City. Experts are worried that magnitude 5 quakes in New York may occur at shallow depths of less than 10 kilometers.

Earthquakes of a 5 or greater magnitude occur once every 100 years according to a report from the Lamont–Doherty Earth Observatory at Columbia University. The last magnitude 5 quake in New York City occurred off the coast of Rockaway Beach in 1884.

There is a low probability of a large-magnitude earthquake but the risk of building-related earthquake losses was considered the fourth most at-risk state by FEMA in 2008. Contributing the risk is that most buildings were built before the seismic code was put in place in 1995. Unreinforced masonry buildings do not perform well in earthquakes. Taller buildings that are next to shorter ones or empty lots are at greater risk from lateral shaking during an earthquake. Overall, the risk of an earthquake in the city is high from even a moderate earthquake because most of the city's aging infrastructure was built without seismic codes.

A 2008 study from Columbia University found that the New York area was at "substantially greater" risk of a 6 or 7 magnitude earthquake than was previously thought. The researchers estimated that magnitude 6 or greater would occur "about once per 670 years".

== Seismicity of New York ==
New York City is located on the North American plate shown in yellow. The closest plate boundaries are located along the Mid-Atlantic Ridge.

The Atlantic continental margin of the Northeastern United States is a passive margin. The seismicity of the northeast is generally considered to be due to ancient zones of weakness that are being reactivated in the present-day stress field. In this model, pre-existing faults that were formed during ancient geological episodes persist in the intraplate crust, and intraplate earthquakes occur when the present-day stress is released along these zones of weakness. The stress that causes the earthquakes is generally considered to be derived from present-day rifting at the Mid-Atlantic Ridge.

The area within 100 km radius of New York City has an intermediate level of seismic activity, more than what is observed in central New York State. It is not as seismically active as California which is located at a transform plate boundary, but large and damaging earthquakes do occur. Furthermore, when these rare eastern U.S. earthquakes occur, the areas affected by them are much larger than for western U.S. earthquakes of the same magnitude. The Ramapo Fault is generally considered the most active fault system in the greater New York City area. The infrequency of seismic events of moderate or high-intensity pose problems for researchers who are unable to firmly associate the earthquakes in the region with specific geologic structures without instrumental records for the notable historic earthquakes.

== Notable earthquakes ==
The largest known earthquake in New York City occurred in 1884, probably somewhere between Brooklyn and Sandy Hook, and had a magnitude of approximately 5. For this earthquake, observations of fallen bricks and cracked plaster were reported from eastern Pennsylvania to central Connecticut, and the maximum intensity reported was at two sites in western Long Island (Jamaica, New York and Amityville, New York). Two other earthquakes of approximately magnitude 5 occurred in this region in 1737 and in the 1783 New Jersey earthquake.

The 2011 Virginia earthquake, a 5.8 magnitude quake centered in northern Virginia that occurred on August 23, 2011, was felt by the occupants of some buildings in Manhattan, more than 200 miles (320 km) north of the quake's epicenter and caused minor physical building damage in Brooklyn. There were some disruptions, including building evacuations and delays at airports, while Amtrak train service at Penn Station was also delayed.

On April 5, 2024, a magnitude 4.8 earthquake centered near Whitehouse Station, New Jersey struck the region; no injuries or damage were immediately reported. This is the highest-magnitude earthquake in the region since 1884. An aftershock of magnitude 3.8 occurred that day close to Gladstone, New Jersey and was felt in Manhattan and Brooklyn.

A magnitude 3.0 earthquake struck Hasbrouck Heights, New Jersey on the evening of August 2, 2025, a year after the April 5 quake. Two days later, on August 5, 2025, a magnitude 2.8 earthquake struck 1km north of Hillsdale, New Jersey.

== New York City-area faults ==
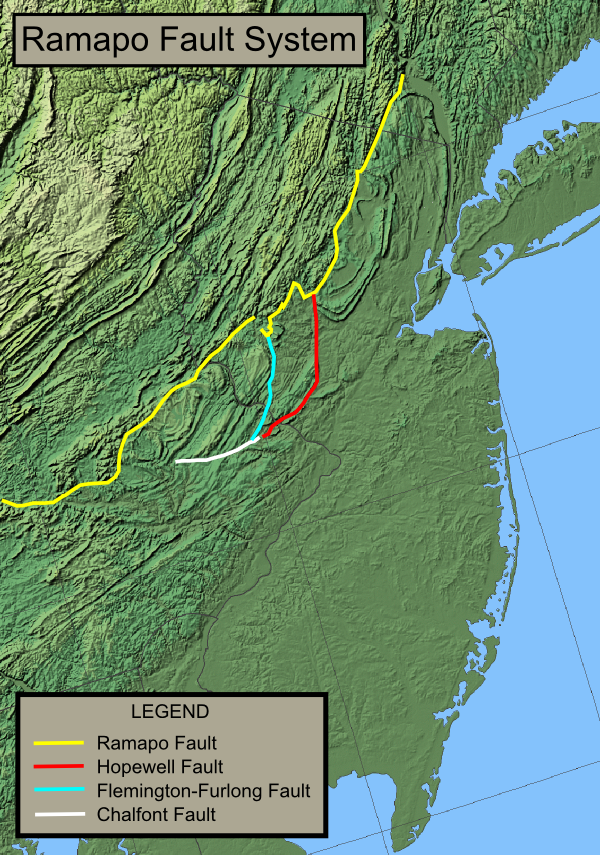
Map depicting the extent of the Ramapo Fault System in New York, New Jersey, and Pennsylvania

The Ramapo Fault, which marks the western boundary of the Newark rift basin, has been argued to be a major seismically active feature of this region, but it is difficult to discern the extent to which the Ramapo fault (or any other specific mapped fault in the area) might be any more of a source of future earthquakes than any other parts of the region. The Ramapo Fault zone spans more than 185 miles (300 kilometers) in New York, New Jersey, and Pennsylvania. It is a system of faults between the northern Appalachian Mountains and Piedmont areas to the east. This fault is perhaps the best-known fault zone in the Mid-Atlantic region, and some small earthquakes have been known to occur in its vicinity. Recently, public knowledge about the fault has increased – especially after the 1970s, when the fault's proximity to the Indian Point nuclear plant in New York was noticed.

There is insufficient evidence to demonstrate unequivocally any strong correlation of earthquakes in the New York City area with specific faults or other geologic structures in this region. The damaging earthquake affecting New York City in 1884 was probably not associated with the Ramapo fault because the strongest shaking from that earthquake occurred on Long Island (quite far from the trace of the Ramapo fault). The relationship between faults and earthquakes in the New York City area is currently understood to be more complex than any simple association of a specific earthquake with a specific mapped fault.

A 2008 study argued that a magnitude 6 or 7 earthquake might originate from the Ramapo fault zone, which would almost definitely spawn hundreds or even thousands of fatalities and billions of dollars in damage. Studying around 400 earthquakes over the past 300 years, the study also argued that there was an additional fault zone extending from the Ramapo Fault zone into southwestern Connecticut. As can be seen in the above figure of seismicity, earthquakes are scattered throughout this region, with no particular concentration of activity along the Ramapo fault, or along the hypothesized fault zone extending into southwestern Connecticut.

== Indian Point ==
Just off the northern terminus of the Ramapo fault is the Indian Point Nuclear Power Plant, built between 1956 and 1960 by Consolidated Edison Company. The plant operated from 1963 until 2021, and it has been the subject of a controversy over concerns that an earthquake from the Ramapo fault will affect the power plant. Whether the Ramapo fault actually does pose a threat to this nuclear power plant remains an open question. Indian Point has been defunct since April 30, 2021.

The Indian Point nuclear power plant is designed to withstand a Mercalli intensity of VII. There is no agreement on the magnitude of quake the plant could withstand, but the estimate of the plant operator is that it would be able to withstand a magnitude 6 quake.
