= 2007 New York City steam explosion =

Coordinates: 40.750764°N 73.976464°W

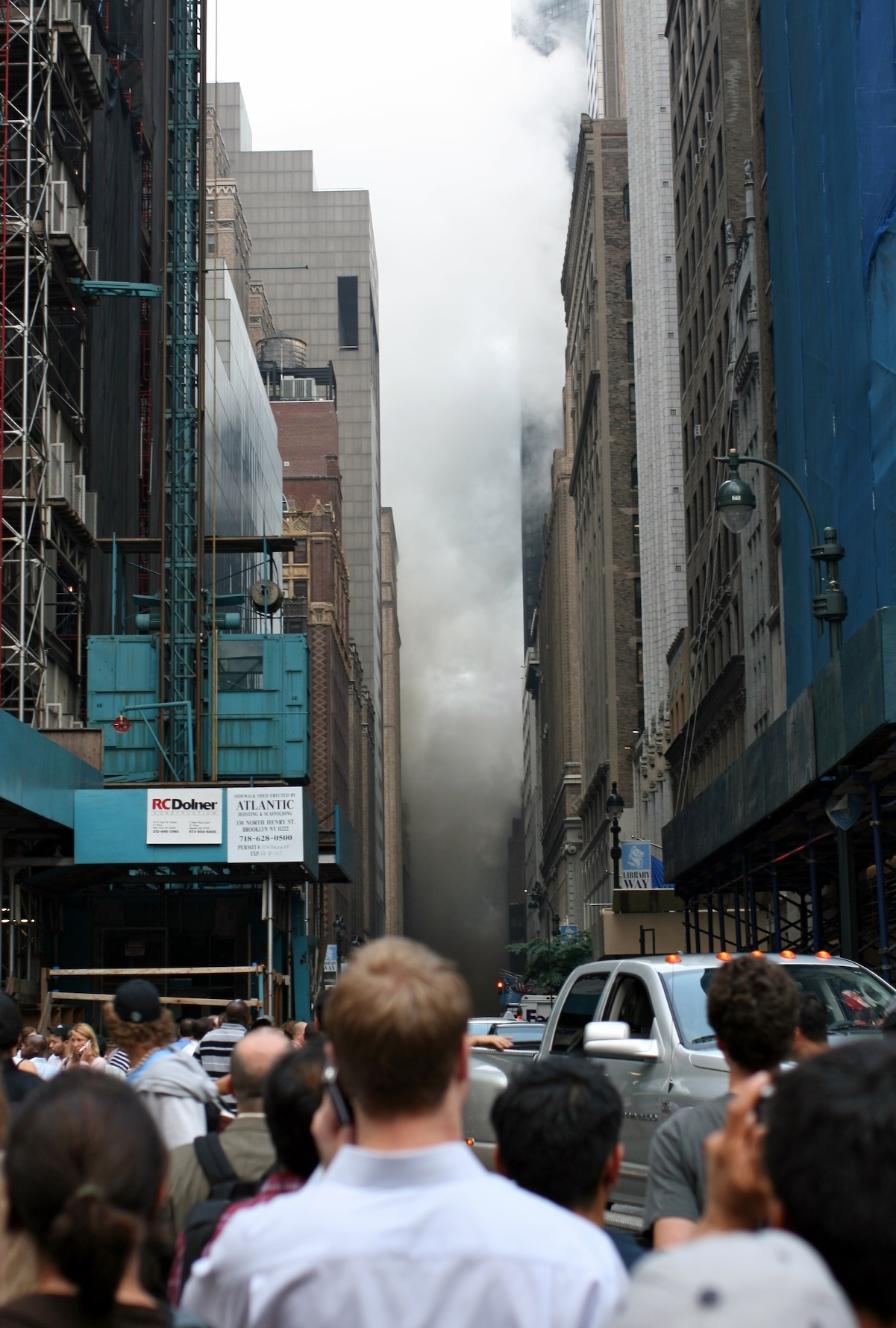
- Rising steam from the explosion
- Date: July 18, 2007
- Time: c. 6:00 p.m.
- Location: 41st Street and Lexington Avenue, Manhattan, New York
- Cause: Underground steam pipe failure
- Deaths: 1 (from heart attack)
- Injuries: 45

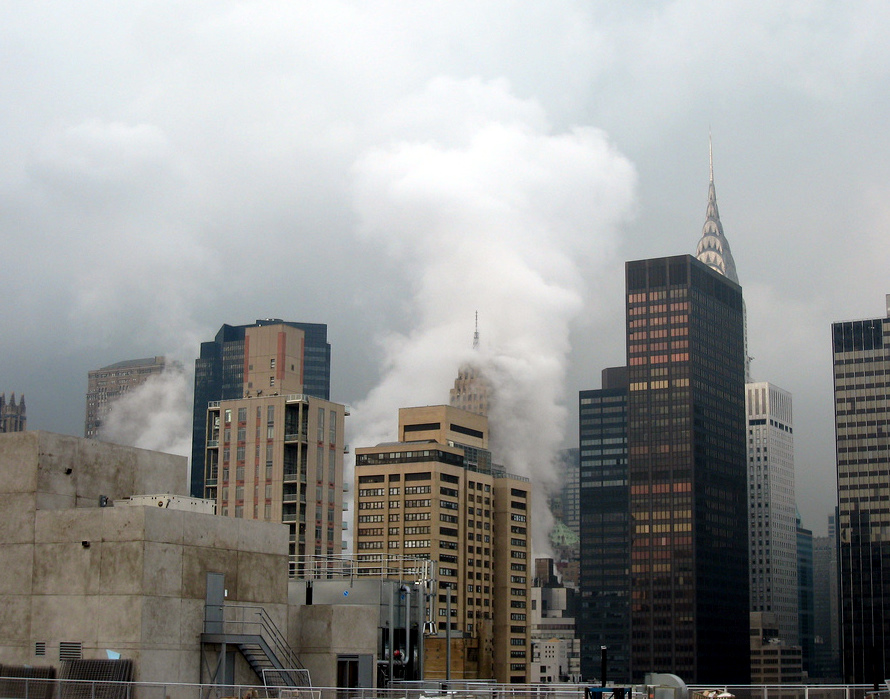
The steam cloud rose above the roof of the 1,047-foot-high (319 m) Chrysler Building

On July 18, 2007, an explosion in Manhattan, New York City, sent a geyser of hot steam up from beneath a busy intersection, with a 40-story-high shower of mud and flying debris raining down on the crowded streets of Midtown Manhattan. It was caused by the failure of an 83-year-old, 24-inch (0.61 m) underground steam pipe near Grand Central Terminal, which exploded during the evening rush hour. 45 people were injured, and one woman died of a heart attack while fleeing.

Initial fears that the cause was related to terrorism were quickly allayed by statements by mayor Michael Bloomberg and other officials shortly after the event.

== Background ==
More than 12 similar Con Edison steam pipe explosions have occurred in New York City since 1987. One of the most significant events occurred near Gramercy Park in 1989, killing two Con Edison workers and one bystander, and causing damage of several million U.S. dollars. The utility eventually pleaded guilty to lying about asbestos contamination from that accident, and paid a $2 million fine. A steam pipe explosion at Washington Square in 2000 near the New York University Bobst Library left a 15-foot (4.5 m) crater in the pavement on Washington Square South, scattering debris and leaving traces of asbestos in the air.

The New York Steam Company began providing service in Lower Manhattan in 1882. Con Edison is now the largest operator of the New York City steam system, which is the largest commercial steam system in the world with more than 100 miles (160 km) of steam pipe. It provides steam service to nearly 2,000 customers serving more than 100,000 commercial and residential establishments in Manhattan south of 96th Street. The utility reported that in 2007, the average age of the steam pipes was 54 years, but some were near 100 years old.

== Event ==
The explosion, which occurred just before 6:00 p.m. local time, near the peak of the evening rush hour, was caused by the failure of a Consolidated Edison 24-inch (0.61 m) underground steam pipe installed in 1924. The pipe was located at 41st Street and Lexington Avenue, near Grand Central Terminal. The towering cloud of billowing steam, higher than the nearby 1,047-foot (319 m)-tall Chrysler Building, persisted for at least two hours, leaving a crater about 35 feet (10 m) wide and 15 feet (4 m) deep.

The escaping steam shook nearby office buildings, causing many occupants to immediately evacuate. A 51-year-old New Jersey woman, who worked a block from the site, died of a heart attack suffered while fleeing the disaster area. Forty-five people were injured, two critically.

The most seriously injured victims were a 23-year-old tow truck driver from Brooklyn, who was scalded over 80 percent of his body by the 400 °F (204 °C) steam and had to be put in a medically induced coma, and his passenger, a 30-year-old woman, who was being driven back to Brooklyn after her car broke down. A witness reported that the tow truck was lifted 12 feet (4 m) by the escaping steam, higher than a nearby city bus.

== Cause ==
The investigation report was issued on December 18, 2007. Engineers were unable to access the crater to assess the damage until the tow truck was removed on July 22, and the on-site investigation was complicated by the asbestos contamination in the crater.

The official report released by the utility company on December 27, 2007, cited a combination of factors, accepting responsibility for deficient repair work done by a contractor that ultimately led to the rupture. The report said that excess sealant, previously used to repair a leaking joint, migrated to two steam trap valves used to drain excess condensed water, clogging them. Then, when heavy rains on the day of the event cooled the pipe causing excess condensate to collect in the steam pipe, the valves could not remove it. As a precaution, the utility replaced more than 1600 similar valves throughout the system, but did not find any other clogs.

=== States of water ===
Steam hammer was suggested as a possible cause. It is a phenomenon that can occur when cold water comes in contact with a hot steam pipe, causing the steam inside to condense into liquid water, resulting in multi-phase flow which can damage piping. Runoff from the heavy rain that day, or possibly a water main break, have been suggested as possible triggers. There was a broken water main at the bottom of the crater, near the broken steam pipe, but it is not known if this was a cause, or an effect. The utility initially reported that instrument readings did not indicate any pressure buildup prior to the explosion. They subsequently revised this assessment saying the ruptured pipe "experienced a sudden internal over-pressurization, due to water hammer, at least five times greater than normal."

Cold water impinging on the cast iron pipe may have also put excess stress on the metal, causing it to fail. The age of the pipe, and the difficulty of inspecting underground infrastructure, made corrosion a possible factor as well, but a New York State safety official reported at a Public Service Commission meeting in September 2007 that there was "no indication that the pipe was deteriorated or weakened by corrosion."

=== Leaks ===
There had been persistent steam leaks and related repair activity in the area the weeks and months prior to the explosion, and utility crews had checked the site only six hours before. Preliminary investigation results showed that a leaking seam repaired just before the disaster was found intact, and the pipe burst suddenly at a location approximately 10 feet (3 m) away.

Robert Caligiuri, an engineer for Exponent Engineering, blamed the rupture on a "crack-like flaw" in a welded seam in the pipe wall, in a preliminary engineering report released on October 23, 2007, that was commissioned by attorneys representing the tow truck driver badly burned in the explosion. He stated, "The observed crack-like flaw appears to be old and is large enough that, in my opinion, Con Ed should have detected it prior to the rupture. Once detected, good and accepted practices would have required that this pipe section be immediately replaced." The utility called the report "misguided" and said in a statement that, "our independent consulting engineers have determined that there was no degradation in the condition of the pipe prior to the rupture," and "the weld in this instance in no way contributed to the rupture. The weld was forced open when the rupture occurred; it was not the cause of the rupture."

=== Asbestos ===
Pipes of that age often were wrapped in asbestos, a known human carcinogen, and the site was declared an "asbestos containment area."

Although some asbestos was later found in the solid debris, no friable particles were detected in any of the air samples. However, anyone entering the containment zone was still required to wear a respirator and protective clothing during the clean-up. This caused some to openly question the air test results, particularly since false reassurances on air quality were given by officials after the September 11 attacks.

More than 100 people evacuated by rescue workers, and the workers themselves were hosed down, and had their clothes taken for testing at a decontamination area. People in the affected area who self-evacuated were initially advised to dispose of, or wash their contaminated clothing separately. Later, they were told to place their clothes in a plastic bag and turn them in to the utility for disposal and reimbursement.

== Effects ==
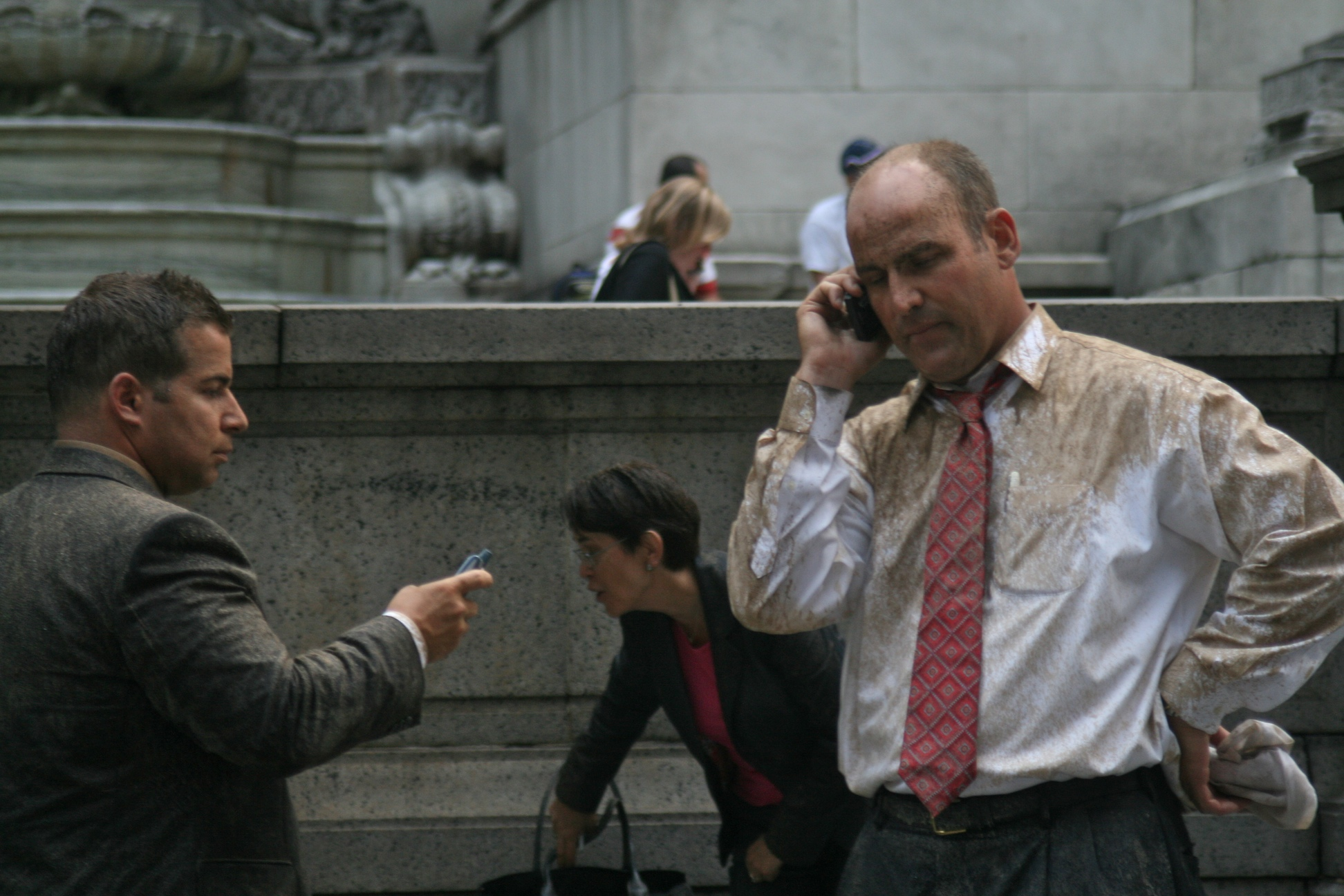
People were covered in debris from the explosion.

=== Emergency response ===
The New York City Fire Department initially sounded a second alarm, then rapidly ratcheted the event up to a five-alarm response, sending more than 200 firefighters from 40 units, three of whom sustained injuries, along with one police officer reported injured. A total of more than 500 New York City police officers and firefighters responded to the event.

Con Edison characterized this as an "all hands event" doubling over shifts to dispatch all available utility workers. The steam leak was not immediately stopped to avoid the possibility of creating another rupture. Once the site was secured, the fire department sounded a sixth alarm for relief.

The New York City Police Department established a "frozen zone" by cordoning off a several block radius around the site, from 40th to 43rd Streets between Vanderbilt and Third Avenues, restricting pedestrian access. This prevented residents from returning to their homes that evening, and kept thousands of workers from their offices the following day, but people already in the area were not forced to evacuate. The police also initially closed several streets to vehicular traffic in a wider area.

=== Short-term disruptions ===
In addition to steam service disruption to 15-20 buildings, telephone service and Internet connectivity were disrupted in the area. Although an underground electrical transformer and feeder cables were also damaged, there were no significant power outages reported, but customers in the affected area were asked to reduce demand. Cellular telephone service was overloaded in the immediate aftermath, and blocked calls were reported as many people in the area tried to make calls at the same time.

Bus and subway service were also affected. The 42nd Street Shuttle and IRT Lexington Avenue Line 4 and 6 train service had to be suspended in Manhattan, and the 5 train was rerouted via the IRT Broadway – Seventh Avenue Line, but the subway infrastructure was not damaged. Subway service was restored overnight, before the next morning's rush hour, with all trains initially bypassing the Grand Central – 42nd Street station. Grand Central Terminal was also at least partially evacuated in the immediate aftermath, and entrances facing the affected area were closed, but Metro-North Railroad commuter train service was not significantly disrupted. By the following evening's rush hour, the Vanderbilt Avenue entrance to Grand Central Terminal was reopened, as well as Third Avenue.

Officials estimated that repairs and cleanup would take at least a week, but as of July 21, no definitive timetable had been announced. An extended environmental clean-up would have significant adverse transportation and economic impact, because the site is in one of the busiest sections of the city, and one of the most expensive commercial districts in the U.S. More than 700,000 commuters pass through nearby Grand Central each work day.

Businesses in the frozen zone were severely impacted, with financial loss estimates as high as US$30,000,000, which could have reached into the hundreds of millions if the clean-up went beyond one week. By July 21, 2007, the frozen zone had shrunk to the four blocks from 40th to 42nd Street from Park to 3rd Avenue. In a twist labeled as ironic by a city lawmaker, a law firm that has Con Edison among its lobbying clients was one of many businesses whose offices were inaccessible due to the frozen zones. Con Edison has offered to reimburse businesses for direct costs of damage and clean-up, but not for business interruption costs, such as lost productivity and revenue.

=== Lawsuits ===
A Brooklyn woman was the first to file a lawsuit against the utility, claiming she was traumatized by the blast, which had reminded her of her sister's death in the attacks on the World Trade Center.

The family of the tow truck driver also announced their lawsuit against Con Edison on July 30.

A woman was also injured in the immediate panic of the crowd evacuating the explosion area. She was trampled by the crowd and severely injured her ankle and knee requiring numerous surgeries. After dying from cancer, her son announced that her lawsuit with the city and Con Edison was settled. Her story was well documented by her son, a producer on the Ron and Fez show on SiriusXM Radio.

=== Political aftermath ===
New York City Council member Daniel Garodnick announced that City Hall hearings on the explosion were set for August 7. The city council also held hearings after the 2006 Queens blackout where Con Edison C.E.O. Kevin Burke was subjected to a grueling round of questioning by local lawmakers. The New York City Council Speaker Christine Quinn and other city lawmakers said they intended to ask tough questions of the utility at the hearings, and would be reevaluating Con Edison's monopoly status, indicating that they have lost confidence in the utility company.

Burke did not appear at the hearing, and sent William Longhi, his senior vice president for central operations to testify instead, angering the council. Longhi provided little additional information pending completion of the investigation, sparking a heated exchange with Quinn. Councilman Leroy Comrie, the chairman of the Consumer Affairs Committee, proposed taking over Con Edison, or breaking it up and deregulating it.

New York State Assemblyman Michael N. Gianaris, a Democrat whose district in the Astoria section of Queens was affected by the 2006 blackout, said Con Edison should be forced to compete for the right to manage the city's power infrastructure and should be subject to annual audits by the New York Public Service Commission.

On December 27, 2007, in response to the report by the utility, New York City Councilman Eric Gioia criticized the company for identifying the city as potentially responsible for the blast in an October court filing laying the groundwork for a possible future lawsuit. That notice of claim said city sewers, pipes and drains could have leaked cold water onto the hot steam pipe. Gioa's statement said, "they'll do anything they can to deflect blame and avoid taking responsibility, but now this report shows that Con Ed's poor maintenance contributed to this deadly explosion."

In Boston, Massachusetts, which has a 22-mile (35 km) network of steam distribution pipes operated by Veolia Energy Boston, Mayor Thomas Menino used the event in New York to push for proposed state legislation regulating commercial steam distribution systems that was progressing slowly. A young boy was severely burned two months earlier by a burst steam pipe in that city.

Philadelphia, Pennsylvania has a network of more than 30 miles (48 km) of steam pipes operated by Veolia Energy Philadelphia, but the city had not had a similar incident for many years. In 1989, a steam explosion at 15th and Wood Streets sent debris into the air damaging some cars. In the wake of the New York City explosion, city officials credited the utility for the extended period of safe operations.

== See also ==
- New York City steam system
- District heating
- Water hammer
