= 2024 New Jersey earthquake =

4.8 magnitude earthquake in Northeastern U.S.

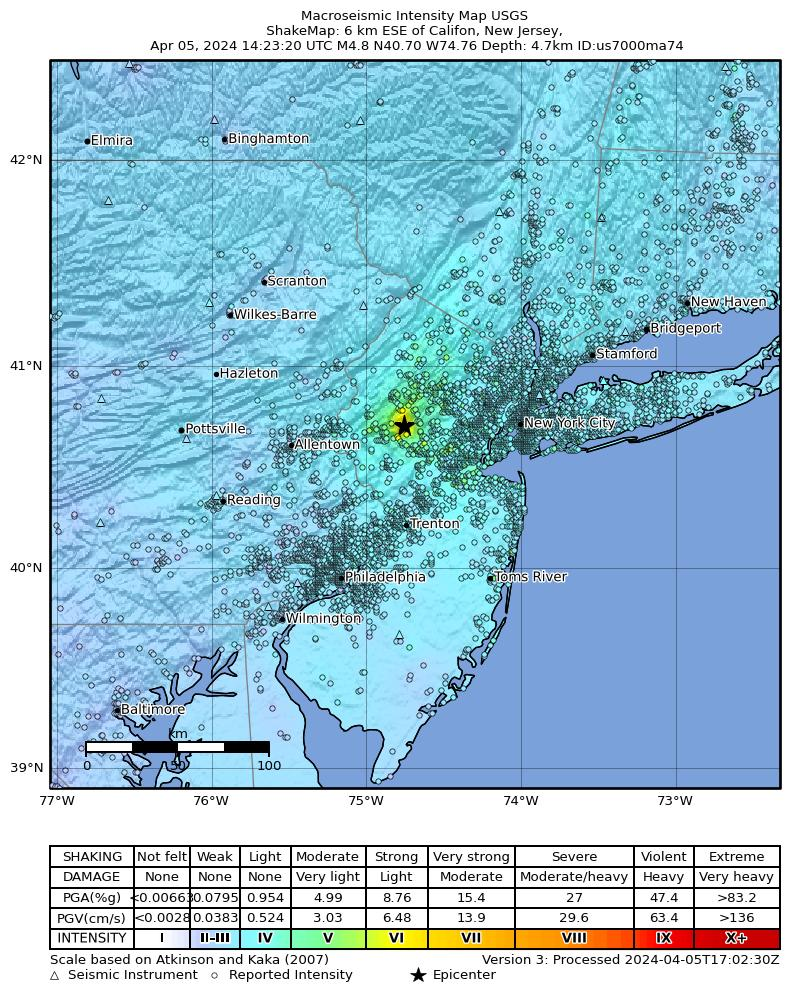
- USGS ShakeMap
- UTC time: 2024-04-05 14:23:20
- ISC event: 637118462
- USGS-ANSS: ComCat
- Local date: April 5, 2024
- Local time: 10:23
- Magnitude: M_{wr} 4.8
- Depth: 4.7 km (2.9 mi)
- Epicenter: Tewksbury Township, New Jersey, U.S. (Note: The United States Geological Survey located the epicenter of the earthquake near Whitehouse Station, New Jersey.); 40.689°N 74.754°W
- Areas affected: New Jersey, New York, Pennsylvania
- Max. intensity: MMI VI (Strong)
- Aftershocks: M_{w}3.7

Map of the main quake and aftershocks (map data)

On April 5, 2024, at 10:23 EDT (14:23 UTC), a M_{w} 4.8 earthquake occurred in the U.S. state of New Jersey, with the epicenter being in Tewksbury Township. While it was felt across the New York metropolitan area; the Philadelphia metropolitan area; the Washington, D.C. metropolitan area; and other parts of the northeastern United States between Virginia and Maine, it had a relatively minor impact, with no major damage reported. There were dozens of aftershocks throughout the rest of the week and into the next.

It was the strongest earthquake to affect New Jersey since the 5.3 M_{fa} 1783 New Jersey earthquake, and the strongest to hit New York City since an estimated 5.0 magnitude earthquake on August 10, 1884.

== Tectonic setting ==
The causative fault for the earthquake was likely in the area of the Ramapo Fault zone, which extends from Pennsylvania to New York and was formed by the break-up of the supercontinent Pangaea during the Late Triassic. Another possible origin is the Flemington Fault, a younger fault in the same area.

The Whitehouse Station, New Jersey area had previously experienced an earthquake on March 14, 2024. The USGS considers this to be part of the event sequence.

== Earthquake ==
The earthquake had a moment magnitude of 4.8 and a depth of 2.9 miles (4.7 km). Its epicenter was in Tewksbury Township, New Jersey, at 40.689°N 74.754°W, about 1 mile (1.6 km) north of Oldwick and 5 miles (8.0 km) east of Lebanon. Tremors were felt all across the Northeastern United States from Maine in the north to Washington, D.C., and Norfolk, Virginia, in the south.

As of August 29, 2024, over 205 aftershocks were reported, the strongest of which had a magnitude of 3.7 and took place about 4 miles (6 km) from Gladstone around 17:59, around 7 hours and 36 minutes after the original quake. Aftershocks have varied in magnitude, ranging from 3.0 to 1.0. The USGS projected a 12% chance of an aftershock with a magnitude greater than 3 and a 1% chance of a stronger earthquake with a magnitude above 4. Millions of residents across the northeastern United States reported feeling the ground shaking, resulting in one of the largest USGS “Did You Feel It?” response datasets for a single earthquake sequence.

== Impact ==
Several buildings in New York City, Philadelphia, and Long Island were shaken. The USGS estimated that the earthquake was felt by about 42 million people in the area.

The earthquake interrupted a meeting of the Security Council on the Gaza war at the United Nations Headquarters in Manhattan, while a performance at the New York Philharmonic was briefly delayed by cell phones sounding an alert at 11:02, which was sent about 40 minutes after the earthquakes were felt. Gas leaks were reported in Rockland County, New York, and at an administrative building in Morristown, New Jersey. In Huntington, New York, a vehicle was damaged after falling into a sinkhole shortly after the earthquake.

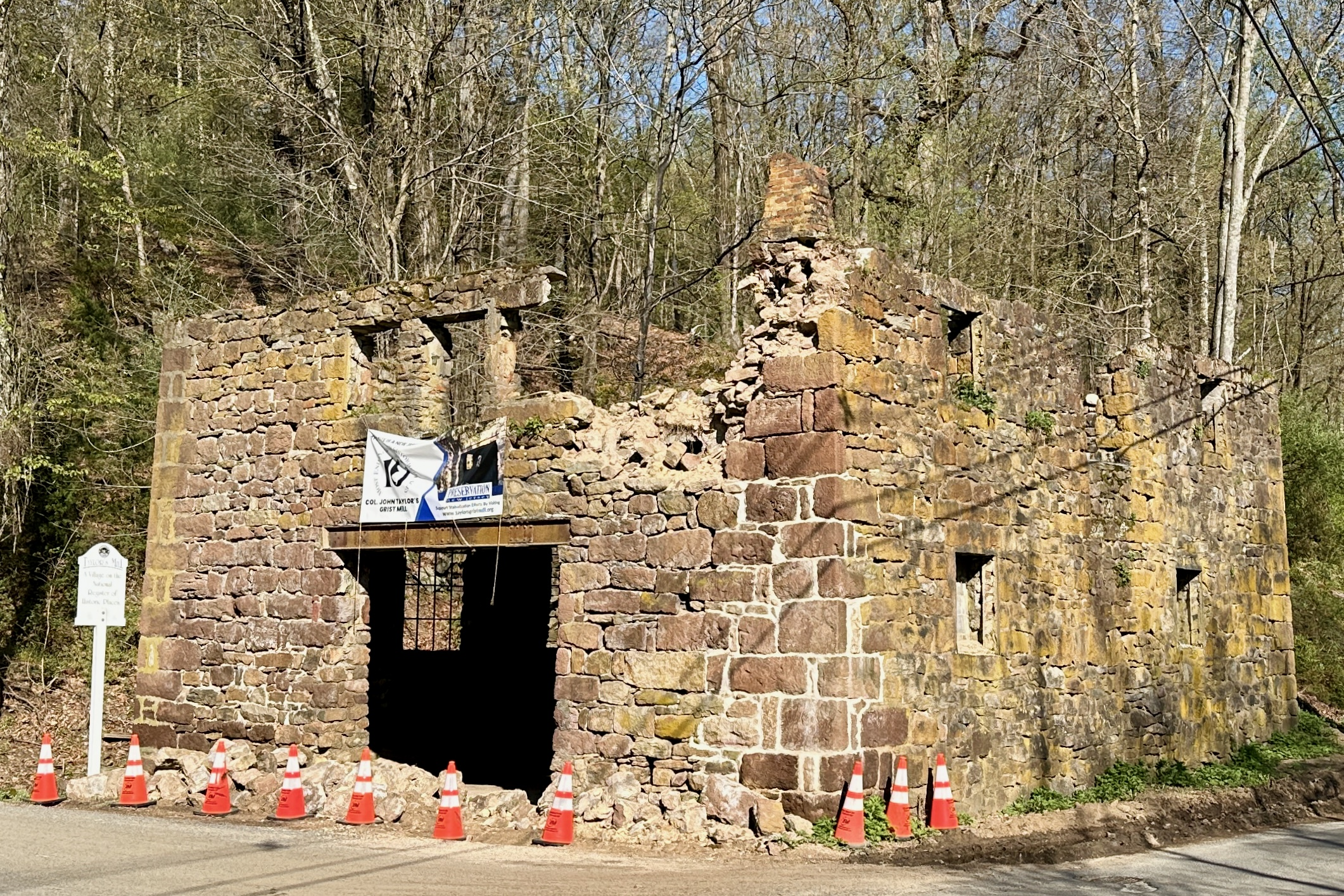
Damage to John Taylor's Grist Mill

Up to 150 buildings were damaged across New York City, and a school gym in East New York sustained damage. Four three-story houses on Seventh Avenue in Newark, New Jersey, were damaged by the earthquake. Twenty-eight residents were evacuated, but no injuries were reported. Three of the houses were "partially toppled" and were subsequently condemned. The upper portion of the 264-year old Col. John Taylor's Grist Mill collapsed into a road. Additionally, the earthquake caused water main breaks in Essex County and Morris County.

Damage to a Northeast Philadelphia home was the only confirmed report of structural damage caused by the earthquake in Pennsylvania.

== Aftermath ==
The Federal Aviation Administration completely halted flights at Newark Liberty International Airport, Philadelphia International Airport and John F. Kennedy International Airport. Arrivals into Baltimore/Washington International, LaGuardia, and Teterboro Airports were delayed. The air traffic control tower at Newark Liberty International Airport was also evacuated. Five flights bound for Newark were diverted to Lehigh Valley International Airport in Allentown, Pennsylvania.

The first emergency alert sent to New York City residents came 26 minutes after the earthquake to subscribers of the Notify NYC service. A Wireless Emergency Alert was sent out to the broader region even later, with New Yorkers reporting it arriving 40 minutes after the earthquake. Amid criticism, New York City Emergency Management Commissioner Zach Iscol defended the delayed response in a press conference, saying that "Twenty minutes is very fast for a public alert," and that they needed that time to confirm that it was indeed an earthquake.

The PATCO Speedline was temporarily suspended for inspection "out of an abundance of caution." Amtrak train speeds were restricted throughout the Northeast while railroad tracks were being inspected for damage, and NJ Transit trains on all lines was delayed around 20 minutes due to track and bridge inspection. AirTrain Newark at the Newark Liberty International Airport was also closed for inspection while its flights were ungrounded.

The Holland Tunnel, a major crossing of the Hudson River, was briefly closed for inspection between 11:00 and 11:15 local time. The Lincoln Tunnel was also briefly closed, backing up traffic in Weehawken.

Within hours of the earthquake, a custom T-shirt shop in Manhattan began printing a joke souvenir reading "I survived the NYC earthquake April 5, 2024." The store put it on the shop window and a pedestrian took a photo of it, which was shared widely on social media, causing hundreds of sales.

A year later on August 2, 2025, another earthquake, magnitude 3.0, struck Hasbrouck Heights, New Jersey, about 8 miles (13 km) west of New York City. Just 3 days after the quake on August 2, another earthquake magnitude 2.8 struck about 1.2 miles (2 km) southwest of Hillsdale, New Jersey.

== See also ==
- Seismicity of the New York City area
- List of earthquakes in the United States
- List of earthquakes in 2024
- 1783 New Jersey earthquake – Earthquake in colonial New Jersey
- 2011 Virginia earthquake – 5.8 Magnitude Earthquake in Virginia, U.S. – felt in New York City and New Jersey
