= Transmission Owner Transmission Solutions =

Electric power bulk transmission projects in New York

The Transmission Owner Transmission Solutions (TOTS) was a group of three electric power bulk transmission projects constructed on the New York bulk transmission system to increase transfer capability between Upstate New York and Downstate New York. The projects were in-service by June 2016. The projects were proposed by a consortium of the state's seven Investor-Owned Utility (IOU) companies (New York Transco (Transco), composed of Consolidated Edison, Orange and Rockland, PSEG-Long Island, Central Hudson, National Grid, New York State Electric and Gas, and Rochester Gas and Electric) in response to a New York State Public Service Commission (NYSPSC) appeal for Indian Point contingency plans in the event that the 2,060-MW Indian Point power facility were to retire. The shutdown of the Indian Point facility has been a policy goal of Governor Andrew Cuomo since before he began his administration in New York in 2011. The TOTS projects are estimated to have costed $240 million to construct. Construction costs were divided between the seven Transco utilities and the New York Power Authority (NYPA). The IOUs are receiving a 10% return on equity (approved by the Federal Energy Regulatory Commission) for construction of the projects which is being recovered through retail consumer rates approved by the NYSPSC.

== History ==
An Indian Point contingency plan, initiated in 2012 by the NYSPSC under the administration of Cuomo, solicited energy solutions from which the TOTS plan was selected. Proposals were solicited from third party developers and the incumbent transmission IOUs. The TOTS projects consist of 3 separate projects that were projected to provide 450 MW of additional transfer capability across a NYISO defined electric transmission corridor. The NYSPSC approved the Certificate of Public Convenience and Necessity for the TOTS projects (usually required before construction of a project) on behalf of Transco on May 19, 2016 (pursuant to section 68 of the Public Service Law). Most other major transmission projects in New York are subject to Article VII of the Public Service Law. These TOTS projects, with the exception of part of the Staten Island "unbottling" were in service by June 2016. The cost of the TOTS projects are distributed among the various IOUs in their rate cases that were approved by the public service commission. The cost allocation amongst themselves was approved by the Federal Energy Regulatory Commission (FERC). NYPA is also receiving a portion of the cost allocation, which they are recovering through tariffs. The cost of the TOTS projects has been estimated to be in the range of between $27 million to $240 million.

== Facilities ==
- Marcy South Series Compensation project: The installation of a 240-MVAR series compensation unit (capacitor bank) at the Fraser Station for a circuit between the Marcy Station and the Fraser Station, reconductoring of a 345-kV circuit between these stations, and the replacement and refurbishment of selected towers.
- Construction of a second Ramapo station to Rock Tavern station 345-kV circuit.
- Staten Island Unbottling project: The splitting of a 345-kV underground circuit in Staten Island.

== Cost allocation ==
IOU	Cost allocation (%)	Estimated Increase in Rate Base ($ mm)
Central Hudson	5.99	14.4
Con Edison / Orange and Rockland	63.18	151.6
New York State Electric and Gas / Rochester Gas and Electric	10.12	24.3
National Grid	12.16	29.2
Long Island Power Authority (PSEG-Long Island)	8.55	20.5

Note: "Increase in Rate Base" is based on an estimated $240 million total construction cost without including the FERC approved 10% ROE.

== Other facilities ==
Several other facilities have been or are being constructed near Indian Point Energy Center which at one point attempted to qualify for the original 2012 contingency plan solicitation from the NYSPSC.

An energy highway initiative was prompted by the Indian Point Contingency Plan order from 2012 (generally speaking, additional lines on the Edic-Pleasant Valley and the Oakdale-Fraser transmission corridors) which is still going through the regulatory process in both the NYISO and NYSPSC.

Other projects include the proposed Champlain Hudson Power Express and the in-service (as of October 1, 2018) CPV Valley Energy plant, a 650 MW natural gas plant located in Wawayanda, New York. The CPV Valley plant has been associated with Governor Cuomo's close aid, Joe Percoco, and the associated corruption trial. There was a 1,000 MW merchant HVDC transmission line proposed in 2013 to the NYSPSC that would have interconnected at Athens, New York and Buchanan, New York, however this project was indefinitely stalled when its proposed southern converter station site was bought by the Town of Cortlandt in a land auction administered by Con Edison. Another plant being built, Cricket Valley Energy Center, rated at 1,100 MW, is on schedule to provide energy by 2020 in Dover, New York.

=== New capacity zone ===
FERC has also been instrumental in developing wholesale market policy in the region of New York that TOTS was designed to alleviate. Approved in 2013 and upheld by a federal appeals court in 2015, a new capacity zone for the NYISO's wholesale capacity market was implemented. Previously, the state only had three locational capacity zones in the wholesale capacity market (rest of state, New York City, and Long Island). The new capacity zone is a fourth zone that extends from the Hudson Valley to New York City and essentially acts as a price floor to the New York City capacity zone price. Historically, the Hudson Valley zone and two other zones north of New York City were located in the lower priced rest-of-state zone. The NYISO's wholesale capacity market provides wholesale energy producers with a revenue stream independent of actual energy production and based upon a unit's power production capability, but it has never been called a standby fee or market. While the creation of new capacity zones has been historically documented, the NYISO has disallowed policy that would provide the ability to remove a capacity zone in the state if a transmission corridor is deemed unrestrained.

== NYSPSC Staff ==
At least one member of the NYSPSC staff responsible for guiding the TOTS projects through the state regulatory process in the years 2012-2016, Raj Addepalli, retired in 2016 as an office Director with a final salary of $165,489 and a total compensation of $181,178 - the highest level of compensation for the department that year.
