= Gramercy Park asbestos steam explosion =

1989 industrial disaster in New York City, United States

Coordinates: 40.7369796°N 73.9851118°W

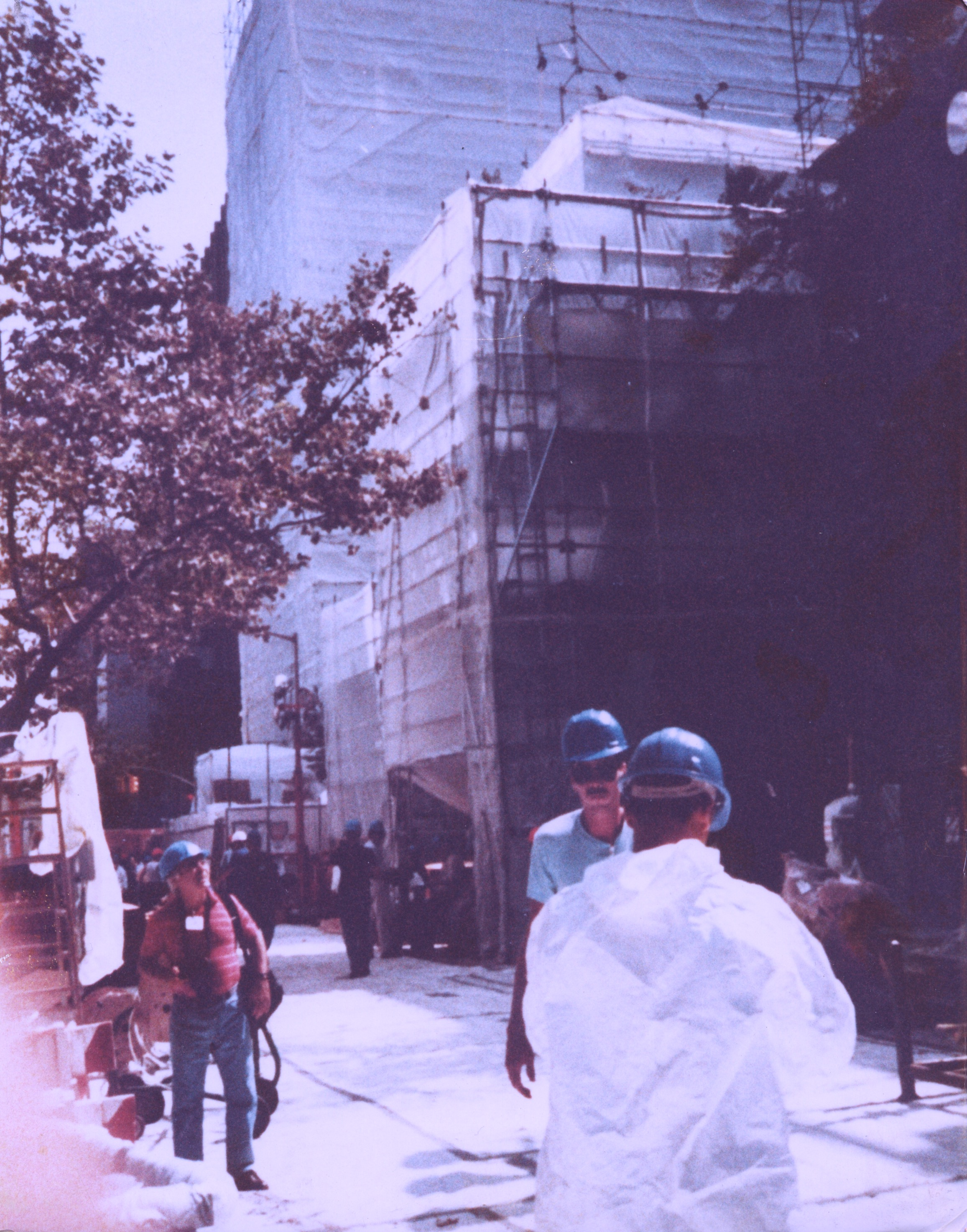
Asbestos cleanup at Gramercy Park

On August 19, 1989, a large steam explosion in front of a residential building generated an asbestos-containing steam cloud in the Gramercy Park neighborhood of Manhattan, New York City. Two people–a Con Ed worker and a 3rd floor resident–died instantly, and 24 were injured. A third person, another Con Ed worker, died the following day. Two hundred residents were displaced for months while cleanup crews worked to remove asbestos-containing mud from building facades. All apartments were remediated by asbestos workers and tested for airborne asbestos.

Workers from Con Ed, the major utility company in the area, were repairing a high-pressure steam pipe in front of the building when a 30-inch (76 cm) connecting sleeve burst, releasing steam and debris upwards. Laboratory testing afterwards determined that the insulating material contained asbestos, which subsequently led to a large-scale evacuation and cleanup. The release from the explosion, in front of 32 Gramercy Park at the corner of 20th Street and Third Avenue, continued for several hours with debris reaching 18 stories. The pipe was covered with asbestos magnesia block insulation which was pulverized and dispersed with the rising steam cloud.

Con Ed initially failed to report that the debris contained asbestos, but after four days announced that the 200 pounds of insulation did contain the carcinogenic material. Five years later, when indicted on the same issue, the company pleaded guilty to conspiracy and environmental law violations in Federal District Court in Manhattan for withholding the information. The final remediation and cleanup cost totaled approximately $90 million, making it one of the most expensive asbestos cleanup projects in history.

== See also ==
- 2007 New York City steam explosion
