= Ramapo Fault =

System of faults in the northeast United States

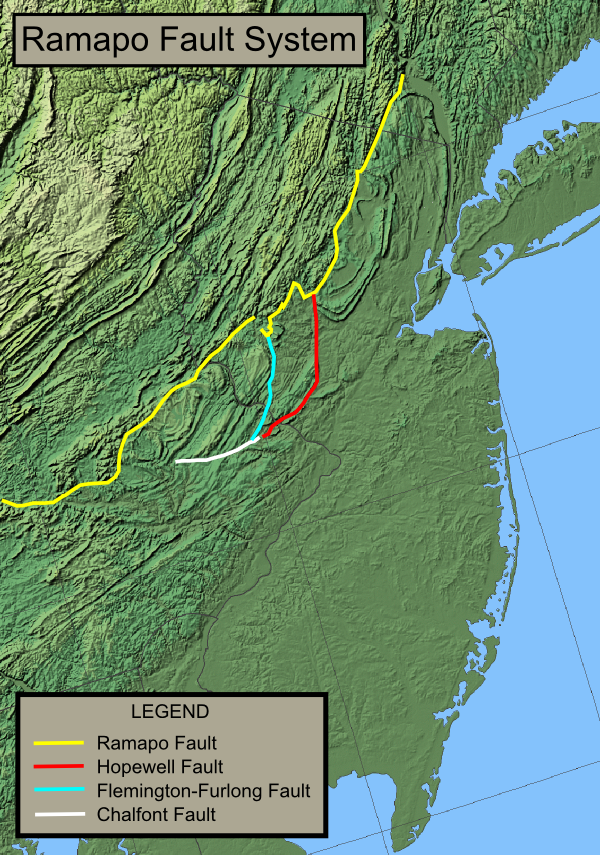
Map depicting the extent of the Ramapo Fault System in New York, New Jersey, and Pennsylvania

The Ramapo Fault zone is a system of faults between the northern Appalachian Mountains and Piedmont areas to the east. Spanning more than 185 miles (298 km) in New York, New Jersey, and Pennsylvania, it is perhaps the best known fault zone in the Northeastern/Mid-Atlantic region, and some small earthquakes have been known to occur in its vicinity. Recently, public knowledge about the fault has increased, especially after the 1970s, when the fault's proximity to the Indian Point nuclear plant in New York was noted.

Some seismologists have argued that this fault has the potential to produce a major earthquake, but earthquakes are scattered throughout this region, with no particular concentration of activity along the Ramapo fault. Thus, others have argued that the Ramapo Fault has not been demonstrated to be any more active than any other fault zones in the greater New York City area.

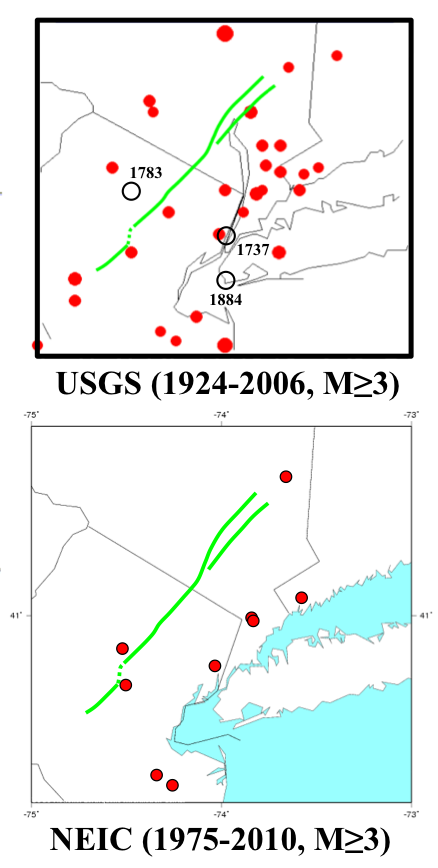
Seismicity in the vicinity of New York City. Data are from the U.S. Geological Survey (USGS) and the National Earthquake Information Center (NEIC). Green lines indicate the trace of the Ramapo fault.

== Background ==
The New York City area is part of the geologically complex structure of the Northern Appalachian Mountains. This complex structure was formed during the past half billion years when the Earth's crust underlying the Northern Appalachians was the site of two major geological episodes, each of which has left its imprint on the NYC area bedrock. Between about 450 million years ago and about 250 million years ago, the Northern Appalachian region was affected by a continental collision, in which the ancient African continent collided with the ancient North American continent to form the supercontinent Pangaea. Beginning about 200 million years ago, the present-day Atlantic Ocean began to form as plate tectonic forces began to rift apart the continent of Pangaea. The last major episode of geological activity to affect the bedrock in the NYC area occurred about 100 million years ago, during the Mesozoic era, when continental rifting that led to the opening of the present-day Atlantic Ocean formed the Hartford and Newark Mesozoic rift basins.

Earthquake rates in the northeastern U.S. are only one percent of those in California, but the earthquakes that do occur in the northeastern U.S. are typically felt over a much broader region than earthquakes of the same magnitude in the western U.S. This means the area of damage from an earthquake in the northeastern U.S. could be larger than the area of damage caused by an earthquake of the same magnitude in the western U.S. The cooler rocks in the northeastern U.S. contribute to the seismic energy propagating as much as ten times further than in the warmer rocks of California. A magnitude 4.0 eastern U.S. earthquake typically can be felt as far as 100 km (60 mi) from its epicenter, but it infrequently causes damage near its source. A magnitude 5.5 eastern U.S. earthquake, although uncommon, can be felt as far as 500 km (300 mi) from its epicenter, and can cause damage as far away as 40 km (25 mi) from its epicenter. Earthquakes stronger than about magnitude 5.0 generate ground motions that are strong enough to be damaging in the epicentral area.

At well-studied plate boundaries like the San Andreas Fault system in California, scientists can often make observations that allow them to identify the specific fault on which an earthquake took place. In contrast, east of the Rocky Mountains, this is rarely the case. The NYC area is far from the boundary of the North American plate which runs along the center of the Atlantic Ocean, the Caribbean Sea, and the west coast of North America. The seismicity of the northeastern U.S. is generally considered to be due to ancient zones of weakness that are being reactivated in the present-day stress field. In this model, pre-existing faults that were formed during ancient geological episodes persist in the intraplate crust, and earthquakes occur when the present-day stress is released along these zones of weakness. The stress that causes the earthquakes is generally considered to be derived from present-day rifting at the Mid-Atlantic Ridge.

The northeastern U.S. has many known faults, but numerous smaller or deeply buried faults probably remain undetected. Virtually all of the known faults have not been active for perhaps 90 million years or more. Also, the locations of the known faults are not well determined at earthquake depths. Accordingly, few earthquakes in the region can be unambiguously linked to known faults. Given the current geological and seismological data, it is difficult to determine if a known fault is still active today and could produce a modern earthquake. As in most other areas east of the Rocky Mountains, the best guide to earthquake hazard in the northeastern U.S. is probably the locations of past earthquakes themselves.

The Ramapo Fault has been blamed for several past earthquakes, but the specific association of any significant earthquake with this fault has yet to be demonstrated. A damaging earthquake affecting New York City in 1884 was incorrectly argued to be caused by the Ramapo fault, likely because it is the most prominent mapped fault in the greater New York City area. At the present, the relationship between faults and earthquakes in the New York City area is understood to be more complex than any simple association of a specific earthquake with a specific fault.

== Geology ==
=== Regional setting ===
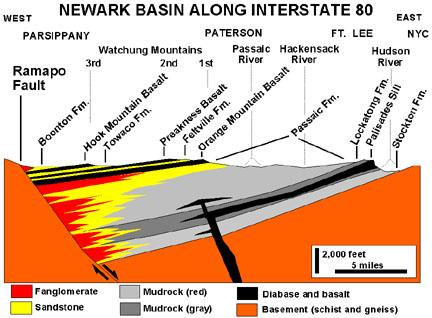
USGS cross-section of the Newark Basin. The Ramapo Fault forms the western boundary of the Newark Basin. It is the surface location of the fault between basement blocks of Precambrian bedrock shown in orange.

New Jersey, eastern Pennsylvania, and southeastern New York are divided geologically into four physiographic provinces, each distinctive in their structure. Westernmost is the Valley and Ridge Province, made up of layers of Cambrian-Devonian sedimentary limestone, sandstone, and shale remaining from ancient sea sediment, sand, and mud. East of this province are the Highlands. This province is composed of the oldest rocks in the region—gneiss, granite, and Precambrian marble – formed by melting sedimentary rock which recrystallized in a deformed state. Paleozoic rock belts are also present in the area.

East of the Highlands is the Piedmont, specifically the Newark Basin. The Ramapo Fault forms the boundary between the Newark Basin and the Highlands, running from Haverstraw, New York to near Schaefferstown, Pennsylvania. The Newark Basin, an aborted rift valley created during the breakup of Pangaea, consists of sedimentary and volcanic rocks from the Triassic and early Jurassic. Smaller extensions of the Ramapo Fault, including the Hopewell, Flemington-Furlong, and Chalfont faults, are present within the basin.

To the east of the Newark Basin are varying geologic provinces. In southeastern New York, from Westchester County south to Staten Island, are the Manhattan Prong Highlands and the Staten Island Serpentine belt (part of the New England province). From the southern tip of Staten Island to Trenton, New Jersey is the Atlantic Coastal Plain. South of Trenton, a low relief extension of the Reading Prong Highlands in the eastern part of the Pennsylvania Piedmont borders the Newark Basin to its southern terminus southwest of Reading.

=== Fault zone ===
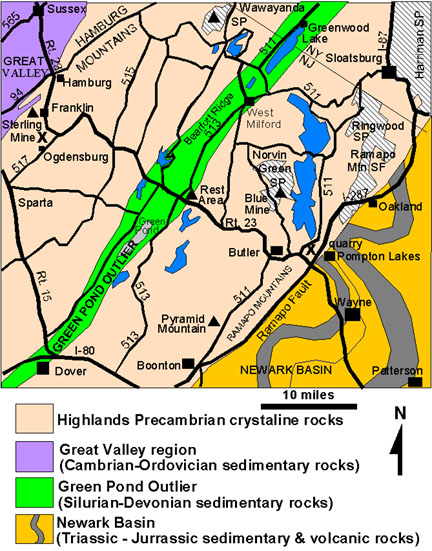
The fault separates the New Jersey Highlands and Piedmont sectors.

The fault system, part of a series of north-east striking, southeast-dipping faults, is probably inactive for the most part. Numerous 5 to 10 mile-long faults branch off the main fault.

With initial activity in the Late Precambrian – Early Paleozoic age, specifically the Cambrian-Ordovician period, the fault has seen six to seven major periods of seismic activity. The last period of heightened earthquake activity probably took place during the Triassic, 200 million years ago. During this time, the Ramapo fault, originally a thrust fault active during the creation of the Appalachian Mountains, was reactivated as the Atlantic Ocean was opening and the supercontinent of Pangaea was being torn apart. The fault became integrally involved in a period of intense rifting, slowly lowering the land to its east by more than nine kilometers to create the Newark Basin. Magma was able to seep through linear fractures along the fault during the late Triassic and early Jurassic, producing episodic flood basalts responsible for the creation of the Watchung Mountains.

== Earthquake hazards in the New York City area ==
Despite the rarity of strong East Coast earthquakes in the United States, they do sometimes occur. Furthermore, when these rare eastern U.S. events do occur, the areas affected by them are, on average ten times as large as western ones for events of the same magnitude. Thus, earthquakes represent at least a moderate hazard to East Coast cities.

Earthquakes in the greater New York City area affect most of New Jersey, the most densely populated state in the United States, as well as New York City. It is difficult to discern the extent to which the Ramapo fault itself (or any other specific mapped fault in the area) might be any more of a source of future earthquakes than any other parts of the region. A 2008 study argued that a magnitude 6 or 7 earthquake was destined to originate from the Ramapo fault zone, which would almost definitely spawn hundreds or even thousands of fatalities and billions of dollars in damage. Studying around 400 earthquakes over the past 300 years, the study also argued that there was an additional fault zone extending from the Ramapo Fault Zone into southwestern Connecticut. On the other hand, other seismologists have argued that neither the Ramapo Fault nor any hypothesized fault zone extending into southwestern Connecticut has been demonstrated to be any more active than any other parts of the greater New York City area.

Just off the northern terminus of the Ramapo fault is the Indian Point Nuclear Power Plant. Built between 1956 and 1960 by Consolidated Edison Company, the plant began operating in 1963, but concerns have been raised that an earthquake from the Ramapo Fault will affect the plant. Whether or not the Ramapo fault actually does pose a threat to this nuclear power plant remains an open question. In Pennsylvania, the fault descends to an area approximately to the west of Pottstown, near the Limerick Nuclear Power Plant, before making its transverse turn west to its southern terminus near Schaefferstown.

== See also ==
- 2024 New Jersey earthquake
