= Cricket Valley Energy Center =

Natural gas power plant in New York

- Country: United States
- Location: Dover, New York
- Coordinates: 41°40′33″N 73°34′50″W
- Status: Operational
- Commission date: 2020
- Operator: EthosEnergy

Thermal power station
- Primary fuel: Natural gas

Power generation
- Nameplate capacity: 1,100 MW

Cricket Valley Energy Center is a power plant in Dover, New York, operated by Olympus Power. The 1,100-megawatt natural gas-fired plant came online in 2020.

The Cricket Valley Energy Center was one of the three natural gas-fired plants in the New York metropolitan area that came online to support electricity needs before the decommissioning of the last nuclear reactor of the Indian Point Energy Center in 2021. The other two plants were Bayonne Energy Center II (120 MW) and CPV Valley Energy Center (678 MW).

In 2022, Cricket Valley Energy Center retrofitted its combined cycle power plant as an early step to prepare for conversion into a hydrogen fuel cell power plant.

== History ==
Pursuant to Article 10 of the Public Service Law, Cricket Valley Energy Center LLC was granted a Certificate of Public Convenience and Necessity to build a 1,000-megawatt (MW) combined cycle natural gas-powered plant in 2013. An Article VII Certificate of Environmental Compatibility and Public Need was granted on April 20, 2016, to build 345-kV transmission lines to interconnect to the site. The 1,100-MW project went into service in April 2020. There are three combustion turbines whose exhaust creates steam to drive a steam turbine. All of the turbines are manufactured by General Electric. It uses an air-cooled condenser to reduce water draw. It is located on a 193-acre former industrial area, the former Mid-Hudson Recycling Center, which was destroyed in a massive 1996 fire. It is fueled by natural gas supplied from a trunk pipeline, one of many that are located along the east coast. Its power is sold into the electric wholesale market administered by the NYISO.

== See also ==
- NYISO
- List of power stations in New York
