= Indian Point Amusement Park =

Indian Point Amusement Park was an amusement park located on the east bank of the Hudson River, in Buchanan, New York. Opened on June 26, 1923, by the Hudson River Day Line as a destination for day-trippers from New York City, it offered carnival rides, miniature golf, a dance hall, and a beer hall among other attractions. It closed in 1956, and the park's location is now the site of the Indian Point Energy Center nuclear power plant.
