= CPV Valley Energy Center =

Natural gas power plant in New York

- Country: United States
- Location: Wawayanda, New York
- Coordinates: 41°24′43″N 74°26′14″W
- Status: Operational
- Commission date: 2018
- Operator: Competitive Power Ventures (CPV)

Thermal power station
- Primary fuel: Natural gas

Power generation
- Units operational: 10
- Nameplate capacity: 675 MW

CPV Valley Energy Center is a power plant in Wawayanda, New York, operated by Competitive Power Ventures (CPV). The 675-megawatt natural gas-fired plant came online in 2018 despite opposition from area residents. CPV was acquired by Israel's OPC Energy in 2021. OPC, partnered with three Israeli institutional investors, agreed in October 2020 to acquire 100% of CPV from Global Infrastructure Partners, (GIP), and now fully owns CPV's operating assets, development pipeline, and asset management business. OPC is a subsidiary of Israeli firm Kenon Holdings Ltd., which is a corporate spin off of Israel Corporation.

The CPV Valley Energy Center was one of the three natural gas-fired plants in the New York metropolitan area that came online to support electricity needs before the decommission of the last nuclear reactor of the Indian Point Energy Center in 2021. The other two plants were Bayonne Energy Center II (120 MW) and Cricket Valley Energy Center (1,020 MW).

== Controversies ==
In 2023, New York State Senator James Skoufis announced an investigation into communications between Competitive Power Ventures, the state's Department of Environmental Conservation (DEC), and the administration of former New York State Governor Andrew Cuomo. At the time, the CPV plant was operating without a Clean Air Act Title V permit, deemed necessary for controlling major sources of pollutants. As chair of the senate's Committee on Investigations and Government Operations, Skoufis sought to evaluate if any interference took place between the regulatory and permitting processes at the DEC.

Joseph Percoco, Governor Cuomo's former executive deputy secretary, was found guilty in 2018 of honest services fraud, conspiracy to commit honest services fraud, and solicitation of bribes and gratuities relating to CPV. A former CPV senior executive, Peter Galbraith Kelly, pleaded guilty in a federal court to arranging a “low-show job” for Percoco's wife, which paid nearly $287,000 in bribes between the years 2012 and 2016. Allegations by federal prosecutors stated that the pay-to-play payments secured Percoco's assistance in obtaining a much-needed power purchase agreement for the energy plant.

As of November 2024, the CPV Valley Energy Center had been operating without a finalized Title V permit for more than six years, according to State Senator James Skoufis. A New York State Senate investigation found delays, regulatory inconsistencies, and concerns about political influence during the plant’s development. Skoufis called on the New York State Department of Environmental Conservation to complete the permit review, urging a 60-day deadline for any remaining submissions before either finalizing the permit through a hearing or declaring the application withdrawn.

In 2014, Governor Andrew Cuomo placed a statewide moratorium on hydraulic fracturing in New York, citing health concerns. However, much of the natural gas used by the CPV Valley Energy Center comes from fracked gas transported from shale regions in Pennsylvania.

== See also ==
- NYISO
- List of power stations in New York
