= Kevin Burke (businessman) =

Business executive

- Education: Cooper Union; Rensselaer Polytechnic Institute; Columbia Business School; Fordham University School of Law
- Occupation: Retired

Kevin Burke was the Chairman, President, and CEO of Consolidated Edison. He joined Consolidated Edison in 1973. He was promoted to Chief Operating Officer in 2000, President and CEO in 2005, and Chairman in 2006, serving until his retirement in 2013. He is a board member of Honeywell since 2010 and a trustee of Alfred P. Sloan Foundation.

== Educational background ==
Burke graduated from Regis High School in Manhattan in 1968. He holds a bachelor's degree in engineering from The Cooper Union, a master's degree in engineering from Rensselaer Polytechnic Institute, a master of business administration from Columbia University, and a juris doctor from Fordham University.

He resides in Ponte Vedra Beach, Florida.
