= Bayonne Energy Center =

Power plant in New Jersey, USA

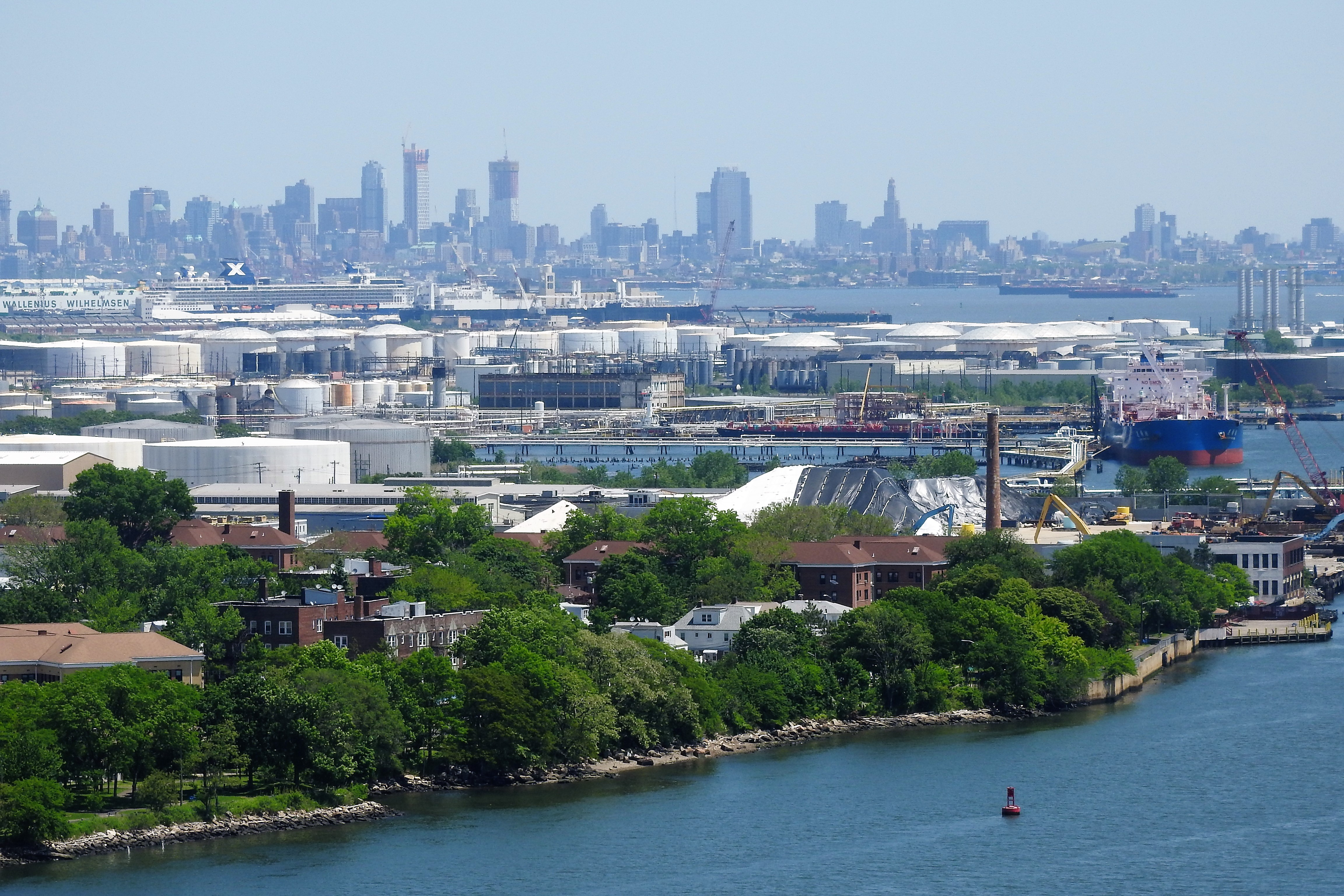
- Bayonne Energy Center is seen at far right of industrial area of Constable Hook
- Country: United States
- Location: Constable Hook; Bayonne, New Jersey
- Coordinates: 40°39′18″N 74°05′39″W
- Status: Operational
- Commission date: 2012
- Owner: Morgan Stanley private investment fund
- Operator: TigerGenCo LLC

Thermal power station
- Primary fuel: Natural gas

Power generation
- Units operational: 10
- Nameplate capacity: 640 MW

Bayonne Energy Center is a natural gas power plant located on Constable Hook in Bayonne, New Jersey providing power to New York City. It was originally developed as a joint venture between Hess Corporation and ArcLight Capital Partners, and it is operated by EthosEnergy.

The plant has a capacity of 644 megawatts and began operations in 2012. It is connected to a Consolidated Edison substation in Gowanus, Brooklyn, New York, by a 6.5-mile (10.5 km), 345-kilovolt underwater transmission line across the Upper New York Bay. This cable is the world's longest XLPE cable.

The underwater portion of the cable is buried 15 feet (4.6 m) below the harbor floor. Permits for the project were submitted to the New York State Department of Public Service, the US Army Corps of Engineers, the New York Department of Environmental Conservation, the New York Department of State, and the New York Office of General Services.

In 2014, Hess sold its share of the plant to ArcLight, which later transferred ownership to Macquarie Infrastructure Company. In 2018, the plant was purchased by a Morgan Stanley investment fund.

An expansion, Bayonne Energy Center II, added 120 megawatts to the facility in 2018. Bayonne Energy Center II was one of three new natural gas plants built to meet regional electricity needs before the closure of the last reactor at the Indian Point Energy Center in 2021. The other two plants were the Cricket Valley Energy Center (1,100 MW) and the CPV Valley Energy Center (678 MW).

== See also ==
- Hudson Generating Station
- Hudson Project, cable connecting Bergen Generating Station to Manhattan
- Kearny Generating Station
- List of power stations in New Jersey
- Neptune Cable
- Newark Energy Center
- NYISO
