= 1783 New Jersey earthquake =

Earthquake in colonial New Jersey

- Location within New Jersey
- UTC time: 1783-11-30 03:50
- ISC event
- USGS-ANSS: ComCat
- Local date: November 29, 1783; 242 years ago
- Local time
- Magnitude: 5.3 M_{fa}
- Epicenter: 41.0°N 74.5°W
- Areas affected: New Jersey
- Max. intensity: MMI VII (Very strong)

On November 29, 1783, at 10:50 p.m. (UTC−5), a M_{fa} 5.3 earthquake occurred in the U.S. state of New Jersey. It was the state's first recorded seismic event. It is estimated that the quake was the largest and strongest that the state has ever recorded. The earthquake caused intensity VII damage on the Mercalli intensity scale.

== Location ==
The earthquake is thought to have originated from within the New Jersey Highlands of the Reading Prong, possibly on the 300 km long, 12 km wide Ramapo Fault zone, a structure formed during the Late Triassic during the break-up of Pangaea. The mainshock was part of a sequence that occurred over a span of several hours. A brief foreshock occurred at 9:00 PM on November 29 (02:00 UTC on November 30), and an aftershock five hours later was reported only in New York City and in Philadelphia, Pennsylvania. The main shaking was felt from New Hampshire to Pennsylvania. There are reports and recordings in diaries that suggest that the earthquake was felt in neighboring states.

== Damage ==
The overall destruction of the quake was not very serious, only ranking as intensity VII damage on the Mercalli intensity scale. The physical damages include dishes thrown off the shelves, people waking up from the shaking, and multiple damaged chimneys. George Washington was visiting New York City at the time to mark the Evacuation Day departure of British forces, and was sleeping at Fraunces Tavern when the earthquake struck, but he was not woken by the tremors.

== Reports ==
Reports show that the earthquake was felt in Philadelphia, New Haven, and Boston.

=== Diary reports ===
Diary entries regarding the earthquake were very brief.

Author	Relevant volume & page	Relevant dates	Relevant passage
Jacob Hiltzheimer	Volume 13	November 29, 1783	"29 [November] Sat[urday]. Clear. Mr. Philip Derheimer spend [sic] the evening at my home. At about twenty minutes after 10 o’clock at night I felt an Earthquake walking through the room upstairs by the Rattling of the Windows which lasted about a half a minute."
Cotton Tuff	N/A	November 29, 1783	"Between 10 & 11 [pm] a small shock of an Earthquake"

=== Newspaper reports ===
Many Contemporary newspapers reported on the earthquake.

Newspaper	Relevant dates	Relevant passage
Pennsylvania Packet	December 2, 1783	"On Saturday night last, about a quarter after ten o’clock, a smart shock of an earthquake was felt in and about this city; and about one o’clock on Sunday morning another, less violent, was felt by many people in the city and suburbs. Most of the houses were very sensibly shaken so that in many the china and pewter, &c. were thrown off the shelves, and several persons were waked [sic] from their sleep. We hope that the country has sustained no damage by this convulsion of nature, which brings fresh to our memory the late calamities of Italy, &c, &c".
