= Indian Point Energy Center =

Nuclear power plant in Buchanan, New York

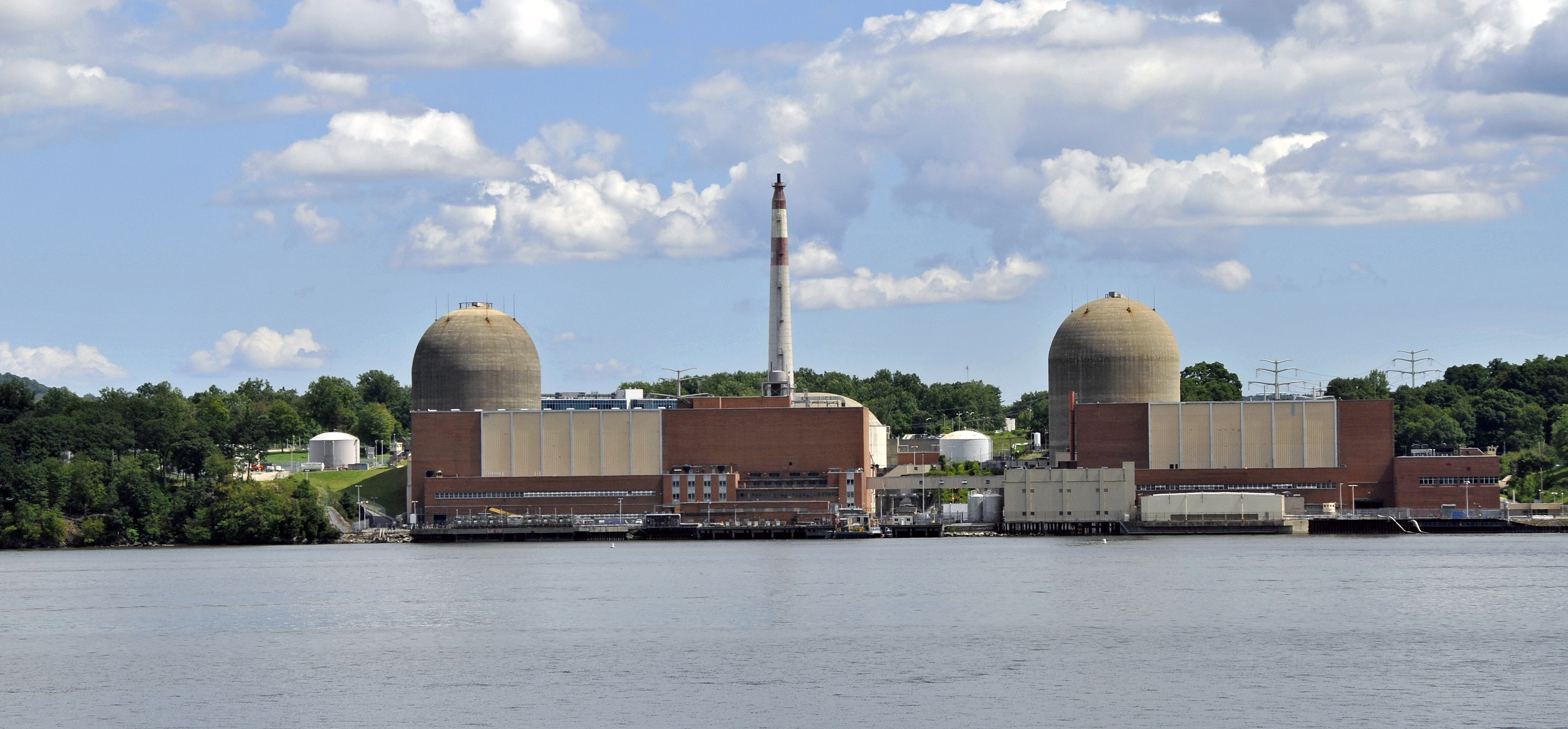
- Holtec Indian Point Energy Center (IPEC) seen from across the Hudson River
- Country: United States
- Location: Buchanan, Westchester County, New York
- Coordinates: 41°16′11″N 73°57′8″W
- Status: Shutdown (Under Decommissioning Process)
- Construction began: Unit 1: May 1, 1956; Unit 2: October 14, 1966; Unit 3: November 1, 1968
- Commission date: Unit 1: October 1, 1962; Unit 2: August 1, 1974; Unit 3: August 30, 1976
- Decommission date: Unit 1: October 31, 1974; Unit 2: April 30, 2020; Unit 3: April 30, 2021
- Construction cost: $2.450 billion (2007 USD, Units 2–3 only) ($3.66 billion in 2025 dollars)
- Owner: Holtec International
- Operator: Holtec International

Nuclear power station
- Reactor type: PWR
- Reactor supplier: Westinghouse Babcock & Wilcox (Unit 1)
- Cooling source: Hudson River
- Thermal capacity: 1 × 615 MW_{th} (decommissioned); 1 × 3216 MW_{th} (decommissioned); 1 × 3216 MW_{th} (decommissioned)

Power generation
- Make and model: Units 2–3: WH 4-loop (DRYAMB)
- Units decommissioned: 1 × 257 MW; 1 × 1020 MW; 1 × 1040 MW
- Nameplate capacity: 1040 MW
- Capacity factor: 84.50% (2017); 73% (lifetime)
- Annual net output: 15,249 GWh (2017)

External links
- Website: https://holtecinternational.com/communications-and-outreach/indian-point/
- Commons: Related media on Commons

Indian Point Energy Center (IPEC) is a defunct three-unit nuclear power station located in Buchanan, just south of Peekskill, in Westchester County, New York. It sits on the east bank of the Hudson River, about 36 miles (58 km) north of Midtown Manhattan. The facility permanently ceased power operations on April 30, 2021. Before its closure, the station's two operating reactors generated about 2,000 megawatts (MW_{e}) of electrical power, about 25% of New York City's usage. The station is owned by Holtec International, and consists of three permanently deactivated reactors, Indian Point Units 1, 2, and 3. Units 2 and 3 were Westinghouse pressurized water reactors. Entergy purchased Unit 3 from the New York Power Authority in 2000 and Units 1 and 2 from Consolidated Edison in 2001.

The original 40-year operating licenses for Units 2 and 3 expired in September 2013 and December 2015, respectively. Entergy had applied for license extensions and the Nuclear Regulatory Commission (NRC) was moving toward granting a twenty-year extension for each reactor. However, due to a number of factors including sustained low wholesale energy prices that reduced revenues, as well as pressure from local anti-nuclear groups and then-Governor of New York Andrew Cuomo, it was announced that the plant would shut down by 2021. The plant permanently stopped generating energy on April 30, 2021. About 1,000 employees lost their jobs as a result of the shutdown.

As a result of the permanent shutdown of the plant, three new natural-gas fired power plants were built: Bayonne Energy Center, CPV Valley Energy Center, and Cricket Valley Energy Center, with a total capacity of 1.8 GW, replacing 90% of the 2.0 GW of low-carbon electricity previously generated by the plant. As a consequence, New York is expected to struggle to meet its climate goals. New York City's greenhouse gas emissions from electricity have increased from approximately 500 to 900 tons of CO_{2} per MWh from 2019 to 2022 as a result of the closure.

Unit 3 currently holds the world record for the longest uninterrupted operating period for a light water commercial power reactor. This record is 753 days of continuous operation, and was set on April 30, 2021 for the operating cycle beginning on April 9, 2019. Unit 3 operated at or near full output capacity for the entire length of the cycle. This record was previously held by Exelon's LaSalle Unit 1 with a record of 739 continuous days, set in 2006.

== Operation ==
=== Reactors ===
Indian Point 1, built by Consolidated Edison, was a 275-megawatt Babcock & Wilcox supplied pressurized water reactor that was issued an operating license on March 26, 1962 and began operations on September 16, 1962. Originally referred to as the Consolidated Edison Thorium Reactor, Unit 1 was intended as the first thorium-fueled commercial reactor in the world. The first core used a thorium-based fuel with stainless steel cladding, but this fuel did not live up to expectations. This was largely due to the fact that the thorium fuel needed to be mixed with highly enriched uranium, and thus made it more expensive than uranium fuel. The thorium-based core shut down in October 1965. The plant was operated with uranium dioxide fuel for the remainder of its life. The reactor was shut down on October 31, 1974, because the emergency core cooling system did not meet regulatory requirements. All spent fuel was removed from the reactor vessel by January 1976, but the reactor still stands. The licensee, Entergy, plans to decommission Unit 1 when Unit 2 is decommissioned.

Indian Point 2 and 3 are four-loop Westinghouse pressurized water reactors both of similar design. Units 2 and 3 were completed in 1974 and 1976, respectively. Unit 2 had a gross generating capacity of 1,032 MWe, and Unit 3 had a gross generating capacity of 1,051 MWe. Both reactors used uranium dioxide fuel of no more than 4.8% U-235 enrichment. The reactors at Indian Point are protected by containment domes made of steel-reinforced concrete that is 40 inches (1.0 m) thick, with a carbon steel liner.

=== Nuclear capacity in New York state ===
Prior to their respective shutdowns, Units 2 and 3 were among six operating nuclear energy sources at four nuclear power stations in New York state. New York was one of the five largest states in terms of nuclear capacity and generation, accounting for approximately 5% of the national totals and Indian Point provided 39% of the state's nuclear capacity. In 2017, Indian Point generated approximately 10% of the state's electricity needs, and 25% of the electricity used in New York City and Westchester County. The New York Power Authority, which supplies the subway, airports, public schools, and housing in New York City and Westchester County, built Unit 3 but they stopped buying electricity from Indian Point in 2012. As a result, Entergy sold all of Indian Point's output into the NYISO-administered electric wholesale markets and into New England. New York state has among the highest average electricity prices in the United States. Fully half of the state's power demand is in the New York City area and about two-fifths of the state's generation originates there.

=== Refueling ===
Units 2 and 3 were each refueled on a two-year cycle. At the end of each fuel cycle, one unit was brought offline for refueling and maintenance activities. On March 2, 2015, Indian Point 3 was taken offline for 23 days to perform its refueling operations. Entergy invested $50,000,000 in the refueling and other related projects for Unit 3, of which $30,000,000 went to employee salaries. The unit was brought back online on March 25, 2015.

=== Economic impact ===
A June 2015 report by a lobby group called Nuclear Energy Institute found that the operation of Indian Point generates $1.3 billion of annual economic output in local counties, $1.6 billion statewide, and $2.5 billion across the United States. In 2014, Entergy paid $30,000,000 in state and local property taxes. The total tax revenue (direct and secondary) was nearly $340,000,000 to local, state, and federal governments. According to the Village of Buchanan budget for 2016–2017, a payment in lieu of taxes in the amount of 2.62 million dollars was received in 2015–2016, and was projected to be 2.62 million dollars in 2016–2017 – the majority of which can be assumed to come from the Indian Point Energy Center.

Over the last decade of its operation, the station maintained a capacity factor of greater than 93%. This was consistently higher than the nuclear industry average and than other forms of generation. The reliability helped offset the severe price volatility of other energy sources (e.g., natural gas) and the indeterminacy of renewable electricity sources (e.g., solar, wind).

Indian Point directly employed about 1,000 full-time workers. This employment created another 2,800 jobs in the five-county region, and 1,600 in other industries in New York, for a total of 5,400 in-state jobs. Additionally, another 5,300 indirect jobs were created out of state, creating a sum total of 10,700 jobs throughout the United States.

Closure of the plant was expected to create a $15,000,000 fund which will be split between "community and environmental" projects, with the Riverkeeper environmental group expecting to receive half, which is subject of a debate with the local community.

== History ==
The reactors were built on land that originally housed the Indian Point Amusement Park, which was acquired by Consolidated Edison (ConEdison) on October 14, 1954.

=== Environmental concerns ===
In 2015, it was alleged that the plant's cooling system killed over a billion fish eggs and larvae annually, despite the use of fish screens. According to one NRC report from 2010, as few as 38% of alewives survive the screens. On September 14, 2015, a state hearing began in regards to the deaths of fish in the river, and possibly implementing a deactivation period from May to August. An Indian Point spokesman stated that such a period would be unnecessary, as Indian Point "is fully protective of life in the Hudson River and $75 million has been spent over the last 30 years on scientific studies demonstrating that the plant has no harmful impact to adult fish." The hearings lasted three weeks. Concerns were also raised over the alternate proposal to building new cooling towers, which would cut down forest land that is suspected to be used as breeding ground by muskrat and mink. At the time of the report, no minks or muskrats were spotted there.

In February 2016, New York State Governor Andrew Cuomo called for a full investigation of the plant's operations by state environment and public health officials. However, Cuomo's political motivation for closing the plant was called into question after it was revealed that two top former aides, under federal prosecution for influence-peddling, had lobbied on behalf of natural gas company Competitive Power Ventures (CPV) to kill Indian Point. In his indictment, US attorney Preet Bharara wrote "the importance of the plant [CPV's proposed Valley Energy Center, a plant powered by natural gas] to the State depended at least in part, on whether [Indian Point] was going to be shut down."

Amid growing calls to close the plant, environmentalists expressed concern about increased carbon emissions if the plant were to close, as nuclear power plants do not directly generate carbon dioxide. A study undertaken by Environmental Progress found that closure of the plant would cause power emissions to jump 29% in New York, equivalent to the emissions from 1.4 million additional cars on New York roads. In April 2016, climate scientist James Hansen took issue with calls to shut the plant down, including those from Senator Bernie Sanders, calling the efforts "an orchestrated campaign to mislead the people of New York about the essential safety and importance of Indian Point nuclear plant to address climate change."

=== Recertification and calls for closure ===
Units 2 and 3 were both originally licensed by the NRC for 40 years of operation. The original federal license for Unit 2 was due to expire on September 28, 2013, and the license for Unit 3 was due to expire in December 2015. On April 30, 2007, Entergy submitted an application for a 20-year renewal of the licenses for both units. On May 2, 2007, the NRC announced that this application is available for public review. Because the owner submitted license renewal applications at least five years prior to the original expiration date, the units were allowed to continue operation past this date while the NRC considered the renewal application.

Efforts to shut down Indian Point were led by the non-profit environmental group Riverkeeper. Riverkeeper argued that the power plant killed fish by taking in river water for cooling and that the power plant could cause "apocalyptic damage" if attacked by terrorists. In 2004, Indian Point was the subject of a documentary, Indian Point: Imagining the Unimaginable, directed by filmmaker Rory Kennedy and starring Riverkeeper lawyer and brother-in-law of former New York Governor Andrew Cuomo, Robert F. Kennedy, Jr. On September 23, 2007, the anti-nuclear group Friends United for Sustainable Energy (FUSE) filed legal papers with the NRC opposing the relicensing of Unit 2. The group contended that the NRC improperly held Indian Point to less stringent design requirements. The NRC responded that the newer requirements were put in place after the plant was complete.

On December 1, 2007, Westchester County Executive Andrew J. Spano, New York Attorney General Andrew Cuomo, and New York Governor Eliot Spitzer called a press conference with the participation of environmental advocacy groups Clearwater and Riverkeeper to announce their united opposition to the re-licensing of Indian Point.

On April 3, 2010, the New York State Department of Environmental Conservation ruled that Indian Point violated the federal Clean Water Act, because "the power plant's water-intake system kills nearly a billion aquatic organisms a year, including the shortnose sturgeon, an endangered species." The state had demanded that Entergy construct new closed-cycle cooling towers at a cost of over $1 billion, a decision that would have effectively closed the plant for nearly a year during construction of the towers. Regulators denied Entergy's request to install fish screens that they said would improve fish mortality more than new cooling towers.

Advocates in favor of recertifying Indian Point included former New York City mayors Michael Bloomberg and Rudolph W. Giuliani. Bloomberg said that "Indian Point is critical to the city's economic viability". The New York Independent System Operator maintains that in the absence of Indian Point, grid voltages would degrade, which would limit the ability to transfer power from upstate New York resources through the Hudson Valley to New York City.

New York State Governor Andrew Cuomo continued to call for closure of Indian Point. In late June 2011, a Cuomo advisor met with Entergy executives and directly informed them for the first time of the Governor's intention to close the plant, while the legislature approved a bill to streamline the process of siting replacement plants.

Nuclear energy industry figures and analysts responded to Cuomo's initiative by questioning whether replacement electrical plants could be certified and built rapidly enough to replace Indian Point, given New York state's "cumbersome regulation process", and also noted that replacement power from out of state sources will be hard to obtain because New York has weak ties to generation capacity in other states. They said that possible consequences of closure will be a sharp increase in the cost of electricity for downstate users and even "rotating black-outs".

Several members of the House of Representatives representing districts near the plant have also opposed recertification, including Democrats Nita Lowey, Maurice Hinchey, and Eliot Engel and then-Republican member Sue Kelly.

In November 2016 the New York Court of Appeals ruled that the application to renew the NRC operating licenses must be reviewed against the state's coastal management program, which the New York State Department of State had already decided was inconsistent with coastal management requirements. Entergy had filed a lawsuit regarding the validity of Department of State's decision.

== Safety ==
Indian Point Energy Center was given a heightened amount of scrutiny and was regulated more heavily than various other power plants in the state of New York (i.e., by the NRC in addition to FERC, the NYSPSC, the NYISO, the NYSDEC, and the EPA). On a forced outage basis – incidents related to equipment failure that force a plant stoppage – it provides a much more reliable operating history than most other power plants in New York. Beginning at the end of 2015, Governor Cuomo began to ramp up political action against the Indian Point facility, opening an investigation with the state public utility commission, the department of health, and the department of environmental conservation. To put the public service commission investigation in perspective: most electric outage investigations conducted by the commission are in response to outages with a known number of affected retail electric customers. By November 17, 2017, the NYISO accepted Indian Point's retirement notice.

In 1997, Indian Point Unit 3 was removed from the NRC's list of plants that receive increased attention from the regulator. An engineer for the NRC noted that the plant had been experiencing increasingly fewer problems during inspections. On March 10, 2009 the Indian Point Power Plant was awarded the fifth consecutive top safety rating for annual operations by the Federal regulators. According to the Hudson Valley Journal News, the plant had shown substantial improvement in its safety culture in the previous two years. A 2003 report commissioned by then-Governor George Pataki concluded that the "current radiological response system and capabilities are not adequate to...protect the people from an unacceptable dose of radiation in the event of a release from Indian Point". More recently, in December 2012 Entergy commissioned a 400-page report on the estimates of evacuation times. This report, performed by emergency planning company KLD Engineering, concluded that the existing traffic management plans provided by Orange, Putnam, Rockland, and Westchester Counties are adequate and require no changes. According to one list that ranks U.S. nuclear power plants by their likelihood of having a major natural disaster related incident, Indian Point is the most likely to be hit by a natural disaster, mainly an earthquake. Despite this, the owners of the plant still say that safety is a selling point for the nuclear power plant.

=== Incidents ===
- In 1973, five months after Indian Point 2 opened, the plant was shut down when engineers discovered buckling in the steel liner of the concrete dome in which the nuclear reactor is housed.
- On October 17, 1980, 100,000 US gallons (380 m^{3}) of Hudson River water leaked into the Indian Point 2 containment building from a fan cooling unit, undetected by a safety device designed to detect hot water. The flooding, covering the first 9 feet (2.7 m) of the reactor vessel, was discovered when technicians entered the building. Two pumps that should have removed the water were found to be inoperative. The NRC proposed a $2,100,000 fine for the incident.
- On February 15, 2000, Unit 2 experienced a Steam Generator Tube Rupture (SGTR), which allowed primary water to leak into the secondary system through one of the steam generators. All four steam generators were subsequently replaced.
- In 2005, Entergy workers while digging discovered a small leak in a spent fuel pool. Water containing tritium and strontium-90 was leaking through a crack in the pool building and then finding its way into the nearby Hudson River. Workers were able to keep the spent fuel rods safely covered despite the leak. On March 22, 2006 The New York Times also reported finding radioactive nickel-63 and strontium in groundwater on site.
- In 2007, a transformer at Unit 3 caught fire, and the Nuclear Regulatory Commission raised its level of inspections because the plant had experienced many unplanned shut-downs. According to an article appearing in The New York Times in 2012, Indian Point "has a history of transformer problems".
- On April 23, 2007, the Nuclear Regulatory Commission fined the owner of the Indian Point nuclear plant $130,000 for failing to meet a deadline for a new emergency siren plan. The 150 sirens installed in the area surrounding the plant are meant to alert residents within 10 miles to a plant emergency.
- On January 7, 2010, NRC inspectors reported that an estimated 600,000 gallons of mildly radioactive steam was intentionally vented to the atmosphere after an automatic shut-down of Unit 2. After the vent, one of the vent valves unintentionally remained slightly open for two days. The levels of tritium in the steam were within the allowable safety limits defined in NRC standards.
- On November 7, 2010, an explosion occurred in a main transformer for Indian Point 2, spilling oil into the Hudson River. Entergy later agreed to pay a $1.2 million penalty for the transformer explosion.
- July 2013, a former supervisor who worked at the Indian Point nuclear power plant for twenty-nine years was arrested for falsifying the amount of particulate in the diesel fuel for the plant's backup generators.
- On May 9, 2015, a transformer failed at Indian Point 3, causing the automated deactivation of reactor 3. A fire that resulted from the failure was extinguished, and the reactor was placed in a safe and stable condition. The failed transformer contained about 24,000 gallons of dielectric fluid, which is used as an insulator and coolant when the transformer is energized. The U.S. Coast Guard estimates that about 3,000 gallons of dielectric fluid entered the river following the failure.
- In June 2015, a mylar balloon floated into a Con Edison-owned switchyard, causing an offsite electrical problem resulting in an automatic shutdown of Unit 3.
- On July 8, 2015, Unit 3 was manually shut down after a feedwater pump failure.
- On December 5, 2015, Unit 2 automatically shut down after several control rods lost power.
- On February 6, 2016, Governor Andrew Cuomo informed the public that radioactive tritium-contaminated water leaked into the groundwater at the Indian Point Nuclear facility.

=== Spent fuel ===
Indian Point stores used fuel rods in two spent fuel pools at the facility. The spent fuel pools at Indian Point are not stored under a containment dome like the reactor, but rather they are contained within an indoor 40-foot-deep pool and submerged under 27 feet of water. Water is a natural and effective barrier to radiation. The spent fuel pools at Indian Point are set in bedrock and are constructed of concrete walls that are four to six feet wide, with a quarter-inch thick stainless steel inner liner. The pools each have multiple redundant backup cooling systems.

Indian Point began dry cask storage of spent fuel rods in 2008, which is a safe and environmentally sound option according to the Nuclear Regulatory Commission. Some rods have already been moved to casks from the spent fuel pools. The pools will be kept nearly full of spent fuel, leaving enough space to allow emptying the reactor completely. Dry cask storage systems are designed to resist floods, tornadoes, projectiles, temperature extremes, and other unusual scenarios. The NRC requires the spent fuel to be cooled and stored in the spent fuel pool for at least five years before being transferred to dry casks.

=== Earthquake risk ===
In 2008, researchers from Columbia University's Lamont–Doherty Earth Observatory located a previously unknown active seismic zone running from Stamford, Connecticut, to the Hudson Valley city of Peekskill, New York—the intersection of the Stamford-Peekskill line with the well-known Ramapo Fault—which passes less than a mile north of Indian Point. The Ramapo Fault is the longest fault in the northeast, but scientists dispute how active this roughly two-hundred-million-year-old fault is. Many earthquakes in the state's varied seismic history are believed to have occurred on or near it. The fault line is visible at ground level and likely extends as deep as nine miles below the surface.

According to a company spokesman, Indian Point was built to withstand an earthquake of 6.1 on the Richter scale. Entergy executives have also noted that "Indian Point had been designed to withstand an earthquake much stronger than any on record in the region, though not one as powerful as the quake that rocked Japan.", in comparison to the 2011 Fukushima Daiichi incident.

According to an August 2010 Nuclear Regulatory Commission study, the NRC's estimate of the risk each year of an earthquake intense enough to cause core damage to the reactor at Indian Point was 1 in 30,303 for Unit 2 and 1 in 10,000 for Unit 3. Msnbc.com reported based on the NRC data that "Indian Point nuclear reactor No. 3 has the highest risk of earthquake damage in the country, according to new NRC risk estimates provided to msnbc.com." According to the report, the reason is that plants in known earthquake zones like California were designed to be more quake-resistant than those in less affected areas like New York. The NRC did not dispute the numbers but responded in a release that "The NRC results to date should not be interpreted as definitive estimates of seismic risk," because the NRC does not rank plants by seismic risk.

In July 2013, Entergy engineers reassessed the risk of seismic damage to Unit 3 and submitted their findings in a report to the NRC. It was found that risk leading to reactor core damage is 1 in 106,000 reactor years using U.S. Geological Survey data; and 1 in 141,000 reactor years using Electric Power Research Institute data. Unit 3's previous owner, the New York Power Authority, had conducted a more limited analysis in the 1990s than Unit 2's previous owner, Con Edison, leading to the impression that Unit 3 had fewer seismic protections than Unit 2. Neither submission of data from the previous owners was incorrect.

I.P.E.C. Units 2 and 3 both operated at 100% full power before, during, and after the Virginia earthquake on August 23, 2011. A thorough inspection of both units by plant personnel immediately following this event verified no significant damage occurred at either unit.

=== Emergency planning ===
The Nuclear Regulatory Commission defines two emergency planning zones around nuclear power plants: a plume exposure pathway zone with a radius of 10 miles (16 km), concerned primarily with exposure to, and inhalation of, airborne radioactive contamination, and an ingestion pathway zone of about 50 miles (80 km), concerned primarily with ingestion of food and liquid contaminated by radioactivity.

According to an analysis of U.S. Census data for MSNBC, the 2010 U.S. population within 10 miles (16 km) of Indian Point was 272,539, an increase of 17.6% during the previous ten years. The 2010 U.S. population within 50 miles (80 km) was 17,220,895, an increase of 5.1% since 2000. Cities within 50 miles include New York (41 miles to city center); Bridgeport, Conn. (40 miles); Newark, N.J. (39 miles); and Stamford, Conn. (24 miles).

In the wake of the 2011 Fukushima incident in Japan, the State Department recommended that any Americans in Japan stay beyond fifty miles from the area. Columnist Peter Applebome, writing in The New York Times, noted that such an area around Indian Point would include "almost all of New York City except for Staten Island; almost all of Nassau County and much of Suffolk County; all of Bergen County; all of Fairfield County". He quotes Purdue University professor Daniel Aldrich as saying, "Many scholars have already argued that any evacuation plans shouldn't be called plans, but rather "fantasy documents"".

The current ten-mile plume-exposure pathway Emergency Planning Zone (EPZ) is one of two EPZs intended to facilitate a strategy for protective action during an emergency and comply with NRC regulations. "The exact size and shape of each EPZ is a result of detailed planning which includes consideration of the specific conditions at each site, unique geographical features of the area, and demographic information. This preplanned strategy for an EPZ provides a substantial basis to support activity beyond the planning zone in the extremely unlikely event it would be needed."

In an interview, Entergy executives said they doubt that the evacuation zone would be expanded to reach as far as New York City.

Indian Point is protected by federal, state, and local law enforcement agencies, including a National Guard base within a mile of the facility, as well as by private on-site security forces.

During the September 11 attacks, American Airlines Flight 11 flew near the Indian Point Energy Center en route to the World Trade Center. Mohamed Atta, one of the 9/11 hijackers/plotters, had considered nuclear facilities for targeting in a terrorist attack. Entergy says it is prepared for a terrorist attack, and asserts that a large airliner crash into the containment building would not cause reactor damage. Following 9/11, the NRC required operators of nuclear facilities in the U.S. to examine the effects of terrorist events and provide planned responses. In September 2006, the Indian Point Security Department successfully completed mock assault exercises required by the Nuclear Regulatory Commission. However, according to environmental group Riverkeeper, these NRC exercises are inadequate because they do not envision a sufficiently large group of attackers.

According to The New York Times, fuel stored in dry casks is less vulnerable to terrorist attack than fuel in the storage pools.

== Closure ==
At the end of 2015, Governor Cuomo began to ramp up political action against Indian Point, opening investigations with the state public utility commission, the department of health, and the department of environmental conservation. To put the public service commission investigation in perspective, most electric outage investigations conducted by the commission are in response to outages with a known number of affected retail electric customers. By November 17, 2017, the NYISO accepted Indian Point's retirement notice. In January 2017, the governor's office announced a phased closure of Indian Point by 2020 (Unit 2) and 2021 (Unit 3).

Unit 2 shut down in April 2020 and Unit 3 shut down in April 2021. Holtec will be purchasing the plant from Entergy and dismantling it. A report by the New York Building Congress, a construction industry association, has said that NYC will need additional natural gas pipelines to accommodate the city's increasing demand for energy. Holtec faced criticism from the community for its plan to discharge wastewater from Indian Point into the Hudson River. Legislation then passed in the NY State Senate and Assembly to prevent any discharge into the Hudson River. This legislation was blocked in 2025, with a judge stating that the bill could not protect the radiological safety of the public or the environment, as such a thing could only be mandated by the federal government; Governor Kathy Hochul and Attorney General Letitia James intended to appeal the decision. The wastewater, which is contaminated with tritium, would result in a dosing of roughly 0.012 millirem to the public if released; this is less than 1/1000 of the federal limit. Environmental groups such as Riverkeeper argue that the water should be allowed to remain in storage for at least one half-life of tritium to pass, reducing its radioactivity by half.

=== Proposals for alternate energy sources ===
Prior to the closure of the plant, some alternate proposals for clean energy generation in the area included Grid energy storage, renewables (solar and wind), a new transmission cable from Canada , and a 650MW natural gas plant located in Wawayanda, New York. There was also a 1,000 MW merchant HVDC transmission line proposed in 2013 to the public service commission that would have interconnected at Athens, New York and Buchanan, New York; however, this project was indefinitely stalled when its proposed southern converter station site was bought by the Town of Cortlandt in a land auction administered by Con Edison. As of October 1, 2018, the 650 MW plant built in Wawayanda, New York, by CPV Valley, is operating commercially. The CPV Valley plant has been associated with Governor Cuomo's close aid, Joe Percoco, and the associated corruption trial. A natural gas-fired power plant, Cricket Valley Energy Center rated at 1,100 MW, was constructed and is operational in Dover, New York as of the second quarter of 2020. An Indian Point contingency plan, initiated in 2012 by the NYSPSC under the administration of Cuomo, solicited energy solutions from which a Transmission Owner Transmission Solutions (TOTS) plan was selected. The TOTS projects provide 450 MW of additional transfer capability across a NYISO-defined electric transmission corridor in the form of three projects: series compensation at a station in Marcy, New York, reconductoring a transmission line, adding an additional transmission line, and "unbottling" Staten Island capacity. These projects, with the exception of part of the Staten Island "unbottling", were in service by mid-2016. The cost of the TOTS projects are distributed among various utilities in their rate cases before the public service commission and the cost allocation amongst themselves was approved by FERC. NYPA and LIPA are also receiving a portion. The cost of the TOTS projects has been estimated in the range of $27 million to $228 million. An energy highway initiative was also prompted by this order (generally speaking, additional lines on the Edic-Pleasant Valley and the Oakdale-Fraser transmission corridors), which is still going through the regulatory process in both the NYISO and NYSPSC.

=== Aftermath ===
The generation capacity lost by closure of the Indian Point plant was largely replaced by fossil gas, substantially increasing carbon emissions. In the first full month after closure, carbon emissions from in-state generation in New York rose 35 percent, and the state's natural gas generation jumped from 35 percent to 39 percent. Energy assessments by the U.S. Energy Information Administration and analyses of NYISO market operations suggest that the retirement of the plant was followed by changes in electricity generation patterns in downstate New York, including increased utilization of natural gas-fired generation during periods of peak demand.

== In popular culture ==
The power plant was parodied as a rival plant in an episode of The Simpsons.

== See also ==
- List of largest power stations in the United States
- Nuclear power in the United States
- New York Power Authority
- New York energy law
