= Champlain Hudson Power Express =

Planned power cable project linking Quebec to New York City

Location
- Country: Canada; United States
- From: La Prairie, Quebec
- To: New York City

Ownership information
- Partners: Transmission Developers Inc. Blackstone Group
- Operator: TransÉnergie

Technical information
- Total length: 339 mi (546 km)
- Capacity: 1,250 MW
- DC voltage: 300–320 kV

The Champlain Hudson Power Express (CHPE) is a high-voltage direct current (HVDC) underwater and underground power cable project linking the Quebec area to the New York City neighborhood of Astoria, Queens. Following completion of a review by the New York State Public Service Commission, permissions were obtained and construction began in 2022. The line was officially activated 1 June, 2026.

The venture, being developed by Transmission Developers, a Blackstone Group portfolio company, carries clean energy—hydropower and wind power from eastern Canada—and feeds it directly to the New York City electricity market. Construction costs for this project are estimated at US$2.2 billion for the section located in the State of New York. The estimated total cost is US$4.5 billion.

The Quebec section of the line was built and is operated by TransÉnergie, the transmission arm of Hydro-Québec.

== Background ==
Power rates in the New York metro area and Long Island have long been among the highest in the U.S. and according to the U.S. Department of Energy, New York City is described as the "epicenter" of grid congestion in the eastern United States. The congestion problem in the New York City area and on Long Island is compounded by the fact that the area uses two-thirds of the state's electricity while most generation and import capacity is located to the north, in upstate and near the Great Lakes.

Over the years, a number of proposals to increase transmission capacity to the New York City and Long Island markets have encountered hostile reactions and determined opposition from environmental groups and communities along the planned paths. For instance, construction of the Cross Sound Cable, a 328-MW submarine DC cable linking Connecticut to Long Island via the Long Island Sound, was authorized in 2002, but its commissioning was delayed for a year because of a dispute involving the promoter and the state of Connecticut. Another project, the Neptune Regional Transmission System has been operational since 2007. The 65 miles (105 km) 500 kV cable connects New Jersey and Long Island. It runs buried in the Atlantic Ocean and has a capacity of 660 megawatts. A proposed HVDC line, West Point Partners, that would have interconnected the grid from a substation in Athens, New York to a substation near the Indian Point Energy Center was tabled when the landowner where the southern converter station would be located, Con Edison, sold the land to the Village of Buchanan. The Village of Buchanan then sold the rights to use the land to the natural gas company Spectra for their new proposed natural gas pipeline.

Meanwhile, a 400 kilovolts DC line 306 kilometres (190 mi) between the Rock Tavern substation, 60 miles north of New York, and the Marcy hub in central New York, has faced repeated challenges and controversy. Launched in 2006, the proposed New York Regional Interconnect (NYRI) had a 1,200 megawatts capacity. It was shelved by its developers in early 2009 after two years of staunch opposition from several groups concerned by the presence of its pylons along the proposed route.

== Project ==
Transmission Developers, whose board is chaired by Brian Kubeck, is backed by Blackstone and was announced on February 23, 2010. Since then, the CHPE Project has made significant progress in terms of securing the governmental approvals. The Federal Energy Regulatory Commission authorized the Project developers to sell transmission rights at negotiated rates in July 2010. Less than a year later, the New York State Department of State issued its Coastal Zone Consistency determination for the project.

=== Settlement ===
On February 24, 2012, the parties participating in the detailed review of the project being conducted before the New York State Public Service Commission (PSC) announced that they had reached a settlement of all of the issues in the proceeding. On April 18, 2013, the New York State Public Service Commission granted the CHPE project a Certificate of Environmental Compatibility and Public Need.

The CHPE project tries to avoid difficulties encountered by other proposals by presenting itself as an "environmentally benign" solution. By avoiding overhead wires and 10 story high towers, the promoter hopes to avoid the fate of previous projects, such as NYRI. The initial project involved two 1,000 MW lines, the first one to New York, and the second going all the way to Connecticut, via the Long Island Sound. The construction cost for the two lines and converter stations in the U.S. was estimated at $3.8 billion. The line to Connecticut was cancelled in July 2010.

According to the company's president and CEO, Donald Jessome, choosing an underwater route avoids " disrupt[ing] communities with overhead transmission". The developer says that the cable also provides economic and environmental benefits to the state, bringing low-cost and clean power to critical load centers.

==== Opposition to project ====
The Atlantic chapter of the Sierra Club asked its members to oppose this project, as wind energy producers located elsewhere in New York state currently cannot get their electricity carried to New York City. It is the Sierra Club's contention that CHPE will stop any chance of New York City getting locally produced wind power and in general dampen the market for local alternative energy production.

=== Route ===
The two cables have a length of approximately 339 miles (546 km) between the Canada-U.S. border and its southern terminal, in New York City. These 5-inch (127 mm) cables are buried at varying depths of 7 feet (213 cm) under Lake Champlain and the Hudson River, Harlem, and East Rivers.

The cables cross the border under Lake Champlain and run southward to the Town of Dresden north of the Village of Whitehall. On its way to the Hudson, the cables are routed briefly along State Route 22 and then parallel the Delaware & Hudson Railroad right-of-way to Rotterdam, at which point it accesses the right-of-way of a CSX Transportation rail line, continuing southwards until it enters the Hudson River near the hamlet of Cementon, NY.

Once the cables are in the Hudson River, they continue south to the Town of Stony Point, where the CSX railroad right-of-way is again relied on until the cables re-enter the Hudson in the Town of Clarkstown. The cables next make landfall in the Harlem River Intermodal Yard in the Bronx, traverses the East River to reach Queens, and terminates at a converter station on the large energy campus in the Astoria neighborhood in the New York City borough of Queens.

=== Economics, emission levels, and reliability ===
In an economic analysis filed on behalf of the promoter to the New York Public Service Commission in July 2010, London Economics International estimates that the projected line would save New York customers $8.1 billion (2010) on their electricity bills over the first 10 years of operations, between 2015 and 2024. In addition, the proposed cable would have positive impacts on the electricity grid, since power carried by the cables could force the retirement of older, uneconomic power plants in New York.

The line, which may carry up to 10.4 terawatt-hours of renewable electricity per year, would lower SO_{2} emissions by 6,800 tonnes, NO_{x} emissions by 10,800 tonnes and CO_{2} emissions by nearly 37 million tonnes during its first decade of operation.

The CHPE may have created 1,400 jobs directly and thousands of indirect and induced jobs. Critics point out that the 1,400 jobs are construction-related and not permanent. The Project will also reinforce the reliability of New York's bulk power delivery system.

The proposed CHPE project has been granted permits by the New York State Public Service Commission, and the final Environmental Impact Statement (EIS) was issued by the U.S. Department of Energy for the project as of 2014.

=== Hydro-Québec's position ===
According to the promoter, the Quebec section of the line would start at a DC conversion station to connect with Hydro-Québec TransÉnergie's Hertel substation (735-315 kV) near La Prairie, and would reach the junction point at the international border in Lake Champlain.

The initial reaction of Hydro-Québec (HQ) and the Quebec government to the CHPE project was mixed, considering the 400 to 500 million Canadian dollars price tag for the Quebec section of the line. In addition, the CHPE could be seen as competing with a proposed 1,200 MW HVDC line to be built by the company in association with NSTAR and Northeast Utilities, which was expected to increase exports of Quebec hydropower to the neighboring New England states. Reflecting on the project in April 2010, Hydro-Quebec's CEO, Thierry Vandal, stated that it was technically "very complex" and "very costly".

Despite its initial reaction, the Quebec utility intervened in support of the proposal before the FERC in May 2010, and the PSC in March 2012.[18] In the March 2012 letter, HQ cited the CHPE project's potential to bring large quantities of renewable energy to downstate New York at no cost to New York ratepayers and the CHPE project's progress before the PSC as the reasons for entering into "active discussions" with Transmission Developers.

Late in January 2013, Hydro-Québec formally filed a project notice to build the Quebec part of the line to the Quebec Minister of Sustainable Development, Environment, Wildlife and Parks, Yves-François Blanchet. The ±320 kV power line would start at the Hertel transmission station, near La Prairie, to reach the US border on the shore of Lake Champlain. The project includes the deployment of a DC terminal at Hertel TS, but in contrast to the US part of the line, Hydro-Québec excludes running the line in the Richelieu riverbed.

After a period of public consultation, HQ came back with a new 58-kilometer path running alongside a 735 kV power line, Autoroute 15, Quebec Routes 202, 221 and rural roads to reach the international border west of the Saint-Bernard-de-Lacolle / Rouses Point border crossing.

== See also ==
- HVDC
- Quebec – New England Transmission
- Cross Sound Cable
