= Edgewater Branch =

Railroad line in New Jersey, United States

Map

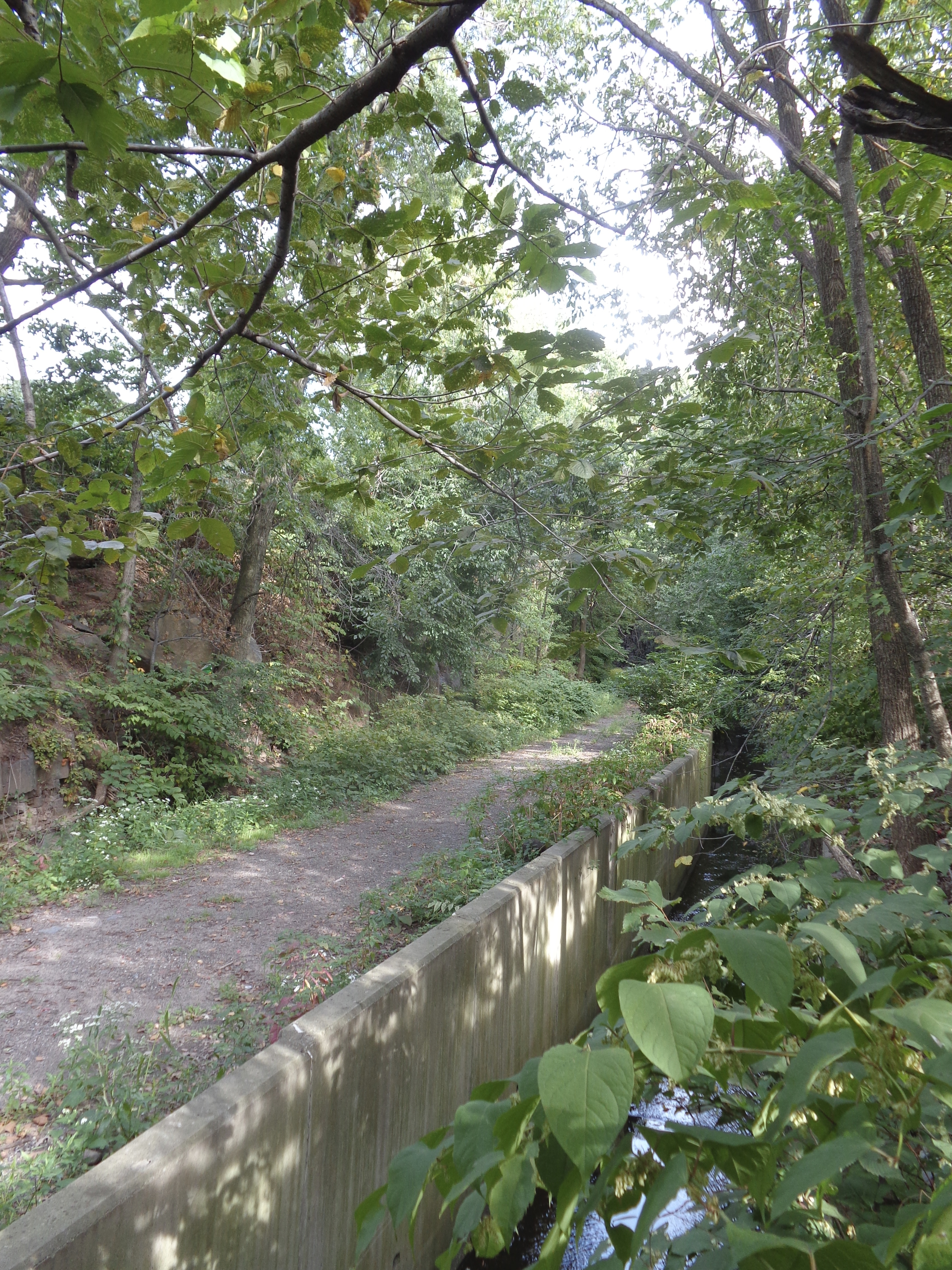
Cut through Fairview Cemetery

The Edgewater Branch was a branch of the New York, Susquehanna and Western Railway (NYS&W) that ran for 3.174 miles (5.108 km) through eastern Bergen County, New Jersey in the United States. Starting from a rail junction at the Little Ferry Yard (in Ridgefield), it went east through the Edgewater Tunnel to Undercliff (as Edgewater was once known) to the Hudson Waterfront.

== History ==
The New York, Susquehanna and Western Railroad handled passenger and freight traffic from the coal mining region in the Wyoming Valley in and around Scranton, Pennsylvania through northern New Jersey. While it had a right-of-way along the foot of the western slope of Hudson Palisades that terminated in Jersey City north of Marion Junction, it did not own a line through Bergen Hill. The railroad paid substantial fees to both the Pennsylvania Railroad (PRR) (for passenger trains) and the Delaware, Lackawanna and Western (DL&W) (for freight service) to use their lines to access terminals on the North River.

In 1892, the Hudson River Railroad and Terminal Company was incorporated as a New York Susquehanna and Western subsidiary. The NYS&W developed a terminal on what had once been a coal yard for oceangoing ships along the Hudson River shore. At the time, the Erie Railroad gained control of the NYS&W as a subsidiary. In 1907, the Erie Terminals Railroad took over control of the Edgewater and Fort Lee Railroad which ran to the Hudson County line and connected with the New Jersey Shore Line Railroad, eventually becoming part of a Belt Line along the shore.

Extensive railyards and car float operations supported the development of industries which dominated the shoreline for much of the 20th century. Among them were Alcoa Aluminum, the Ford Motor Company, Lever Brothers, the Valvoline Oil Company, and Archer Daniels Midland. In 1940, the NYS&W became disbanded from Erie control, as part of their bankruptcy reorganization. The NYS&W also abandoned their coal operations, but they still provided a coal barge route out of Edgewater for the World War II effort and the Marshall Plan, until the railroad closed their coal terminal in 1948.

In 1946, the NYS&W formed a partnership with Seatrain Lines, where Seatrain would ship rolling stock overseas between Edgewater, Texas, Puerto Rico. During the 1950s, the Edgewater factories closed as industries globalized, facilities became obsolete, and customers switched to truck-shipping. The closure of Ford's Edgewater Assembly Plant in 1955 cost the NYS&W one of their primary sources of income. In 1961, real-estate developer and millionaire Irving Maidman purchased the Ford plant for use as a rental warehouse, and he eventually purchased an Alcoa plant for the same purpose.

In October 1962, Maidman purchased the NYS&W to ensure their freight operations in Edgewater remained active, and he began arranging for the railroad to lease some property in Edgewater for backup storage. In 1968, Seatrain abandoned the NYS&W to form a new partnership with the U.S. government, and Maidman sued Seatrain for compensatory damages. In 1976, the NYS&W was forced into bankruptcy, after they experienced multiple financial problems and defaulted on New Jersey state taxes, and by that time, the Edgewater Branch was no longer profitable.

In 1980, the NYS&W was sold to the Delaware Otsego Corporation (DO), and two years later, they sold the Edgewater Branch east of the tunnel, but they still performed some maintenance on the trackage. Throughout the 1980s, remaining businesses that the NYS&W served closed down to the point only two customers remained. In October 1989, the Edgewater Branch was embargoed on the basis of unsafe conditions of the tunnel, where chunks of the ceiling occasionally fell.

== Edgewater Tunnel ==
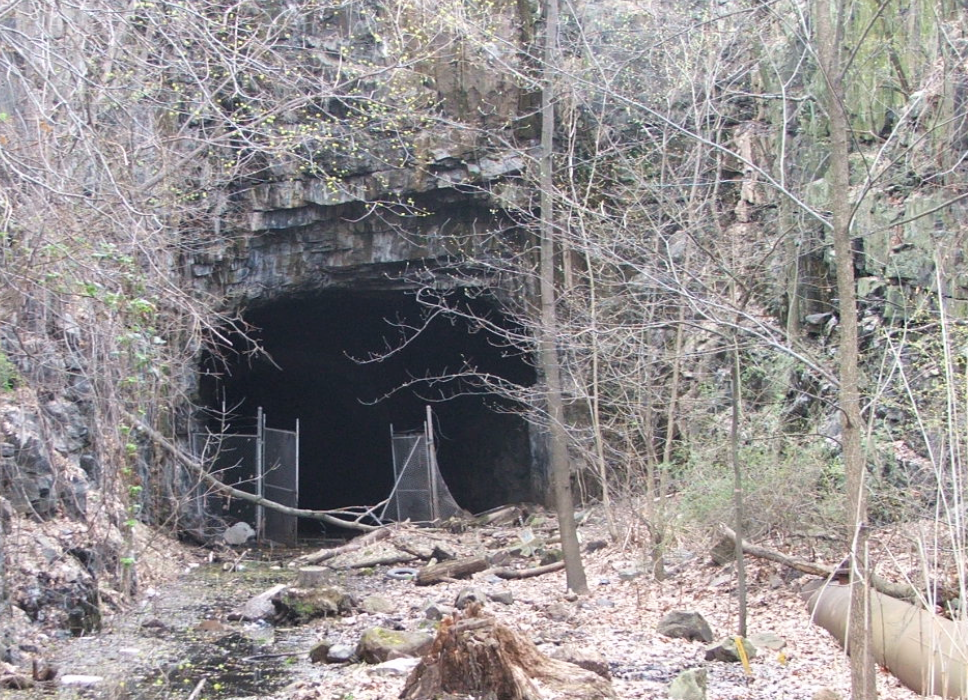
Western portal in Fairview (40°48′53″N 74°00′22″W)

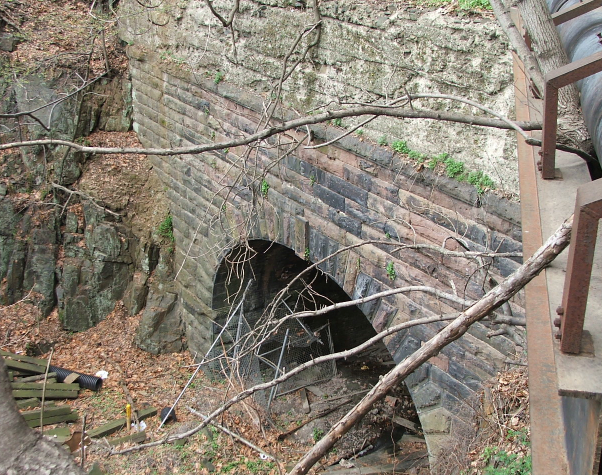
Eastern portal in Edgewater (40°48′48″N 73°59′16″W)

The Edgewater Tunnel is a former railroad tunnel through Bergen Hill, the Hudson Palisades. Originally opened in 1894, it was built to gain access to the Hudson River waterfront. About 200 ft (61 m) underground and about 1 mile (1.6 km) long, its western cut and portal is located in the Fairview Cemetery in Fairview and the eastern portal is located in Edgewater. The right-of-way was removed from service in about 1992 and the track was removed shortly thereafter.

A pipeline now runs through the tunnel between Hess facilities in Bogota and Edgewater. A power cable, part of the Hudson Project, running from a Bergen Generating Station substation through the tunnel and under the Hudson to Midtown Manhattan, was completed in 2013.

== Status ==
The branch line remains in partial use between Undercliff Junction in Ridgefield and the bridge at US Route 1/9 in Fairview east of Route 1/9, but trackage through the cut and tunnel was removed in October 1992. The right-of-way itself has not been abandoned. By the early 2000s, the Edgewater yard was ripped up and redeveloped as a shopping mall and condominium complex.

During the 1980s and early 1990s, planners and government officials realized that alternative transportation systems needed to be put in place to relieve increasing congestion along the Hudson Waterfront It was decided that the most efficient and cost-effective system to meet the growing demands of the area would be a light rail system. When a new transportation network was proposed, it was suggested that the tunnel be used for what became the Hudson-Bergen Light Rail, but that idea was ultimately rejected in favor of the Weehawken Tunnel. The Hudson Waterfront/River Road corridor has seen extensive residential and commercial development and subsequent congestion since that time, and further studies of a more comprehensive transportation strategy have been conducted.

The station along the line at the Vince Lombardi Park & Ride is part of the proposed Passaic–Bergen–Hudson Transit Project.

== See also ==
- New Jersey Midland Railway
- Timeline of Jersey City area railroads
- Timeline of the New York, Susquehanna and Western Railway
- List of bridges, tunnels, and cuts in Hudson County, New Jersey
- Northern Branch Corridor Project
