= Cooperstown and Charlotte Valley Railroad =

Heritage railroad in New York, U.S.

Coordinates: 42.700928°N 74.926048°W

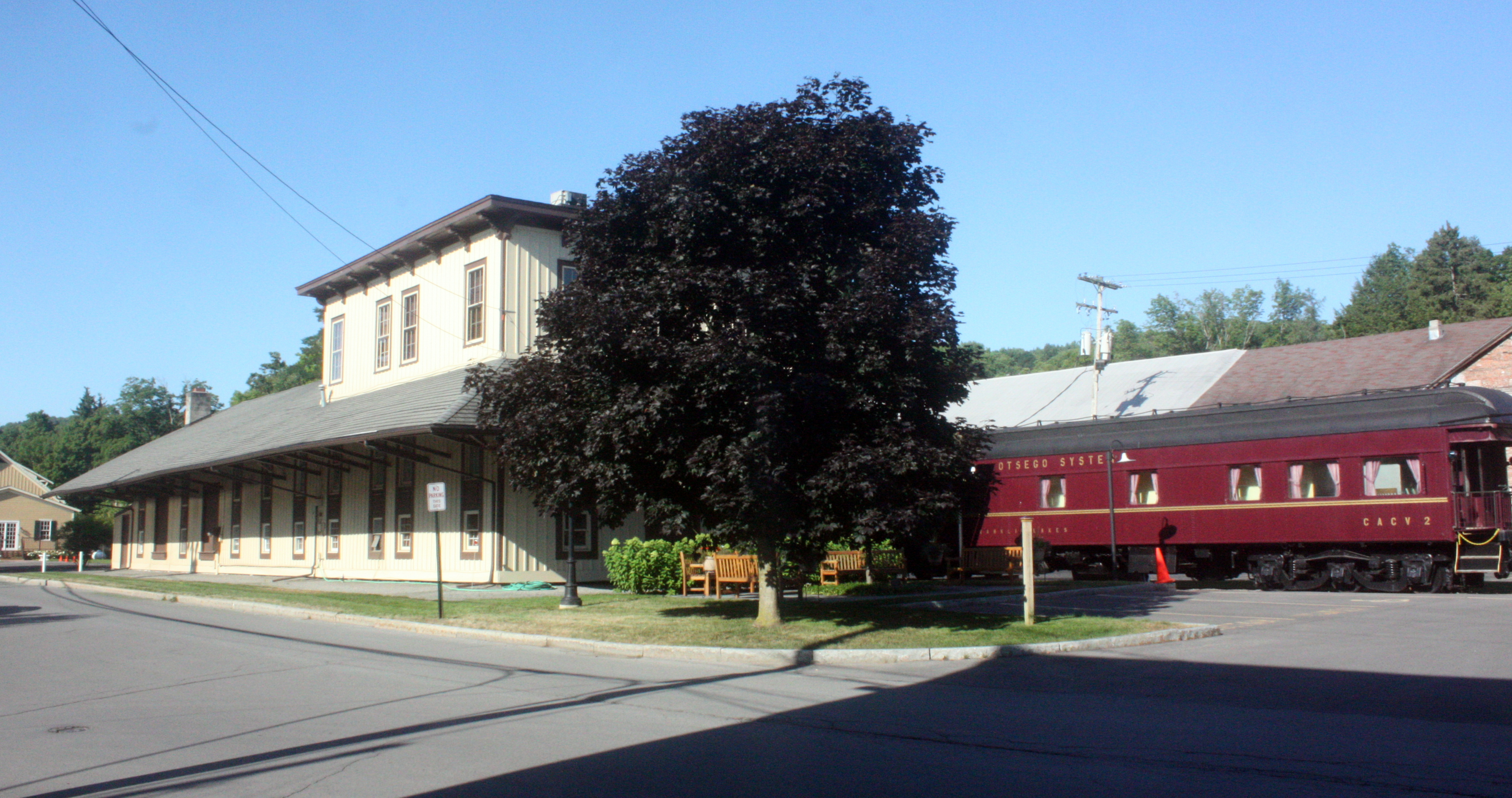
- Former station in Cooperstown

Overview
- Headquarters: Cooperstown, New York
- Reporting mark: CACV
- Locale: Otsego County, Upstate New York
- Dates of operation: 1869–present
- Predecessor: Cooperstown and Susquehanna Railroad Company

Technical
- Track gauge: 4 ft 8 1/2 in (1,435 mm)
- Previous gauge: 6 ft (1,829 mm)
- Length: 16 miles (26 km)

Other
- Website: www.lrhs.com

The Cooperstown and Charlotte Valley Railroad Company (reporting mark CACV) is a heritage railroad in New York, operated by the Leatherstocking Chapter of the National Railway Historical Society (NRHS) since 1996.

== History ==
=== Original company ===
The Cooperstown and Susquehanna Valley Railroad Company (C&SV) was chartered in 1865. The stated purpose was to construct a railroad from Village of Cooperstown to a new junction with the Albany and Susquehanna Railroad at Colliersville. In February 1868, construction on the line began, and after it was completed, the first train operated on July 14, 1869. The trackage was originally broad-gauge (6 feet (1,800 mm), for compatibility with the Albany and Susquehanna. In May 1876, all 16 miles (26 km) of the trackage was converted to standard-gauge (4 feet (48 in).

Two extensions of the C&SV were authorized by the state of New York. The first extension, completed in 1869, ran from Cooperstown to Richfield Springs, but it was abandoned in 1941. The second extension, completed in 1885, ran from its southern terminus to the 'Hemlocks' on the Charlotte creek in the town of Davenport. It was later abandoned in the early 1900s.

On June 6, 1880, the enginehouse of the C&SV burned down, damaging the railroad's two locomotives and incinerated a baggage car. In 1888, Cooperstown and Charlotte Valley Railroad (C&CV) was incorporated, and they were authorized to extend their trackage to the lands of Matthew Ward in Davenport.

The C&CV was formed by a group of brothers and businessmen, since Thomas Cornell of Kingston, had "procrastinated" since 1872 in extending his Ulster and Delaware Railroad (U&D) westward from Stamford to Oneonta. The plan was to extend the existing line eastward from Cooperstown to Cooperstown Junction. The planned route was to lie along the Charlotte Valley through Davenport Center, Harpersfield; thence to Cooksburg, onetime terminal of the Canajoharie and Catskill, and down Catskill Creek to a connection with the West Shore Railroad.

Construction on the trackage began, following an 1888 blizzard, and by 1889, 6 miles (9.7 km) of trackage to West Davenport were completed. In early February 1890, the C&CV tracklayers reached Davenport Center, while the graders resumed work east of Harpersfield. Cornell died on March 30, 1890, and all further work on the C&CV was subsequently halted. The trackage ended at West Davenport, and then there was a hiatus of construction for one year.

In February 1891, the West Davenport Railroad was chartered, and they were authorized to construct a line from the West Davenport depot of the C&CV to the lands of the McLaury sisters, east of the Kort Right Brook. On April 13, 1891, the C&CV and the West Davenport Railroad were consolidated. Two days later, the C&CV leased the C&SV.

For the next several years, stagecoach service was provided between Kingston to Cooperstown, and it connected the railroad gap between the C&CV and the U&D. In March, 1899, the U&D began work west of Bloomville. In 1900, construction was completed of the U&D trackage to Davenport Center, West Davenport and Oneonta. Upon reaching Davenport Center, another line was installed to traverse the Charlotte Creek on a steel bridge, then followed the north bank of the creek to West Davenport, where a connection was made with the C&CV, and the two railroads using a joint station.

=== Delaware and Hudson ownership ===
In 1903, the C&CV fell under the ownership of the Delaware and Hudson Railroad, and became designated as the "Cooperstown Branch". The D&H built an ornate stone station in Cooperstown shortly thereafter. Along with a branch to Cherry Valley, the former C&CV line became a rural feeder into the D&H mainline. On August 10, 1905, passenger service between Cooperstown Junction and the U&D connection ceased.

In 1934, the New York State Public Service Commission permitted the discontinuance of all passenger service on the C&CV. The last scheduled passenger train operated from Cooperstown to Cooperstown Junction on June 24, 1934. Concurrently, the D&H constructed a turntable and a small locomotive maintenance facility in Cooperstown, but they were later removed in the 1950s.

On September 10 and 11, 1949, the post-World War II Freedom Train visited Cooperstown, attracting over 4,000 visitors. On March 1, 1957, the C&CV was formally merged into the D&H. By the 1960s, the Cooperstown Branch continued to operate, using ALCO S-type switchers and an ALCO RS-11. During that time, the former branch experienced declining traffic.

=== Delaware Otsego ownership ===
By 1971, the D&H decided to abandon the Cooperstown Branch, and that same year, the branch was acquired by the Delaware Otsego Corporation (DO). The sale took place, after Delaware Otsego was forced to sell their 2.6-mile (4.2 km) section of the abandoned New York Central (NYC) U&D branch at Oneonta, in favor of construction of Interstate 88. The condemnation of the section by the state of New York, saved the major cost of constructing a concrete I-88 highway bridge over it.

Delaware Otsego resurrected the C&CV name, and they built a new locomotive maintenance facility at Milford. DO also established their headquarters inside the former Cooperstown station: the stone passenger station that the D&H built shortly after their 1903 takeover of the C&CV. DO began to operate tourist trains on the C&CV, using Ex-United States Army 0-6-0 steam locomotive No. 2, and they purchased an ALCO RS-2 from the D&H. In 1975, No. 2 was placed into storage in Milford, and the tourist trains continued to operate exclusively behind diesels, until the mid-1980s.

DO opted to prioritize their freight operations, but by the early 1980s, freight traffic on the C&CV merely broke-even. Concurrently, the C&CV trackage was used to store strings of idle boxcars for the St. Lawrence Railway. Several of these cars were stored on Clintonville Hill in the vicinity of milepost 7, and they were only secured with handbrakes, despite the steepness of the grade. On one occasion, vandals released the brakes on several cars, causing them to roll southward and derail at the foot of the grade. Metal remains of the wreckage can be found between the railroad right-of-way and the west bank of the Susquehanna River. The final C&CV freight train operated in December 1987, and occasional equipment moves subsequently occurred on the right-of-way.

=== Leatherstocking chapter, NRHS ownership ===
In 1996, the Leatherstocking Chapter of the National Railway Historical Society (NRHS) purchased the line from DO. NRHS chapter volunteers performed vegetation removal and trackbed rehabilitation before the line was reopened for seasonal tourist excursion service between Cooperstown and Milford. In 1999, tourist excursions on the railroad commenced, retaining the C&CV name.

Initially, the C&CV leased a former New York, Ontario and Western Railway locomotive, as well as two locomotives from the Green Mountain Railroad. It currently owns and operates a pair of ex-Canadian National Railway MLW switchers (ALCO S-4 and ALCO S-7 designs), which were acquired from Atlas Steel in Welland, Ontario. These locomotives continue the numbering scheme used by the D&H for its S series switchers (C&CV Nos. 3051 and 3052). In late 2012, No. 3051 was painted into a D&H livery, with C&CV lettering. In August 2015, No. 3052 was repainted into its original livery as Canadian National No. 8223.

The Leatherstocking Railroad Museum houses a pair of former Amtrak GG1 electric locomotives (formerly Pennsylvania Railroad No. 4909 and 4917), both of which are owned by the NRHS Leatherstocking Chapter. In January 2022, No. 4909 was deeded to the Chapter as a gift by The Henry Ford Museum of Dearborn, Michigan. This locomotive had been purchased for $15,000 by the Museum from its owner, Chapter President Bruce E. Hodges, in prior years. The Norfolk Southern Railway (NS), which obtained the mainline route that interchanges with the C&CV, refused to ferry it from Cooperstown Junction to Dearborn, due to alleged clearance issues and its heavy weight.

== Equipment ==
Locomotive details
Number	Images	Type	Class	Builder	Built	Status
3051		Diesel	S-4	American Locomotive Company	1956	Operational
8223		Diesel	S-7	Montreal Locomotive Works	1957	Operational
102		Diesel	S-4	American Locomotive Company	1950	Operational
104		Diesel	S-4	American Locomotive Company	1950	Undergoing repairs
2028		Diesel	FL9	Electro-Motive Diesel	1956	Undergoing repairs
2010		Diesel	FL9	Electro-Motive Diesel	1957	Stored, awaiting repairs
1036		Diesel	DDT 10-ton switcher	Plymouth Locomotive Works	1953	Inoperable
1040		Diesel	DDT 10-ton switcher	Plymouth Locomotive Works	1953	Undergoing overhaul
1050		Diesel	DDT 10-ton switcher	Plymouth Locomotive Works	1957	Operational
