= Little Ferry Yard =

Coordinates: 40°50′22″N 74°01′28″W

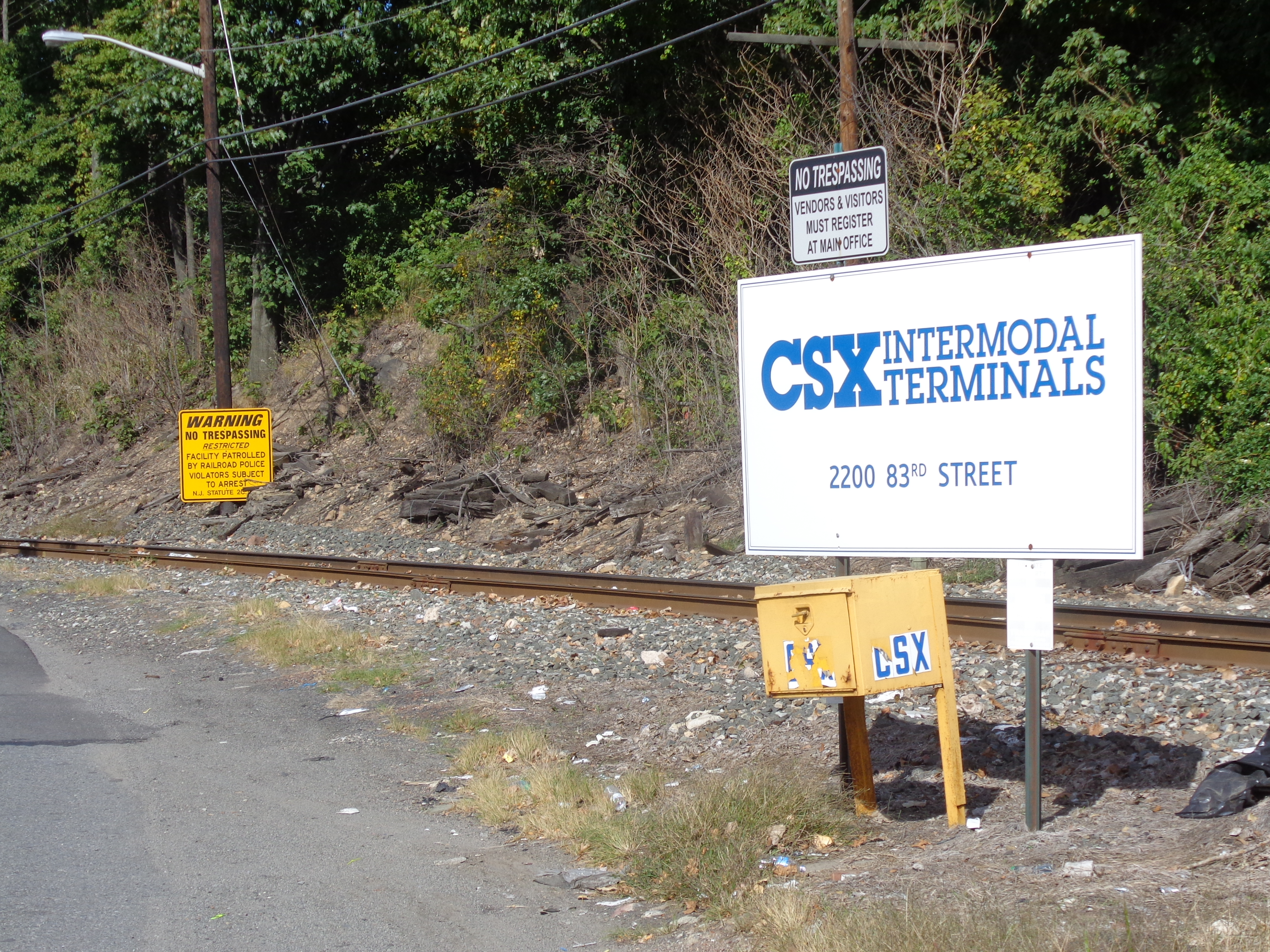
Road and NYSW mainline in Babbitt

Little Ferry Yard is a railyard and intermodal terminal in the Port of New York and New Jersey served by the CSX River Subdivision (CSXT), New York, Susquehanna and Western Railway (NYSW), Norfolk Southern Railway and Conrail Shared Assets Operations (CRCX).

Originally developed by NYSW, it was later acquired by CSX. Located in Ridgefield, New Jersey and extending into Ridgefield Park, it takes its name from the ferry that used to travel across the Hackensack at approximately this location—the town on the western side, Little Ferry, was also named for this ferry. The yard's street address is in Babbitt, North Bergen, from where it is accessible by road. It is situated at the confluence of the Hackensack River and Overpeck Creek near the Bergen Generating Station.

South of the facility the River Subdivision continues to the North Bergen Yard, where it terminates. Traveling slightly further the NYSW mainline terminates at the Landbridge Terminal at the Jersey City border. The NYSW Undercliff Junction provides access to a spur to the Edgewater Tunnel, occupied by a natural gas pipeline as of 2021. and the electric cable for the Hudson Project.

To the north, the lines cross north over Overpeck Creek. CSX has a two-track swing bridge. As of 2015, the NYS&W bridge was slated for replacement. The River Subdvison continues along the original West Shore Railroad alignment through Bergen County and Rockland County, New York reaching the Hudson River after passing through a tunnel at Haverstraw. It continues north to a point near Selkirk Yard where it junctions with the Port Subdivision and Castleton Subdivision. At Bogota the NYSW veers west crossing the Hackensack, and at Paterson, the Passaic River to Sparta, crossing the state line into New York at Warwick.

Numerous studies to restore passenger service that would travel through the yard on have been conducted, but not materialized. The Passaic–Bergen–Hudson Transit Project proposes a station at the Vince Lombardi Park & Ride of the New Jersey Turnpike which is adjacent to the Edgewater Branch.

== See also ==
- Timeline of Jersey City area railroads
- River Line (Conrail)
- Bergen Turnpike
- Ridgefield Park (NYCRR/NYS&W station)
- Selkirk hurdle
- List of rail yards
