= Hanford Mills =

Historic grist mill and sawmill in New York

- Hanford Mills Museum
- U.S. National Register of Historic Places
- U.S. Historic district
- Hanford Mills Museum in 2026

- Location within New York Location within the United States
- Location: 51 County Route 12, East Meredith, New York
- Coordinates: 42°25′25″N 74°53′11″W
- Area: 50 acres (20 ha)
- Built: 1846
- Website: hanfordmills.org
- NRHP reference No.: 73001178
- Added to NRHP: March 26, 1973

Hanford Mills Museum is a historic grist mill and sawmill located at East Meredith, New York in Delaware County, New York. It has operated as a museum since 1967 and was listed on the National Register of Historic Places in 1973.

== History ==
=== Origins ===
A lumber mill was first constructed at the site in 1846 by Jonathan B. Parris, a local laborer who needed a closer source of lumber. Parris's mill was a small, seasonal operation that most likely only ran in the spring and fall, when there would have been enough water to saw rough lumber. He operated the mill until 1851, after which it changed hands several times without ever achieving much profitability.

=== Hanford family ===
View of the mill in 1895

In 1860, D.J. Hanford bought the mill along with a nearby farm. Hanford had previously operated the mill on behalf of its last owner, but didn't rely on the mill alone to provide him with a living. He focused on his farming operation through the Civil War years and only began to make substantial mill improvements in 1868, when he hired men to build an addition and purchased a gristmill and turbine to grind animal feed and local buckwheat flour. At the same time, a planer was added to the sawmill, allowing that business to produce finished lumber for the first time.

Hanford continued to expand the business in the following years. In the 1870s the mill installed additional equipment and began to produce items such as butter tub head covers, cow stanchions, fence posts, siding, and wagon parts. A steam engine was installed in 1881, allowing for year-round operations. D.J. Hanford's son, Horace Hanford, became involved with the operation and led efforts to improve record-keeping. Horace and his brother Herbert Willis "Will" Hanford took over the operation in 1897 and continued to make improvements and expansions to the facilities.

In 1900 the Ulster and Delaware Railroad connected East Meredith to wider markets and forced the mill to rethink some operations. The Hanford's initial plan to produce broom and tool handles for companies out of state fell through after their prices were undercut by larger factories elsewhere. Instead, the Hanfords began to build warehouses along the railroads and sell hardware and supplies to local farms and businesses. The mill continued to operate and improve, adding a gasoline engine in 1910 and a Fitz overshot water wheel in 1926.

=== Pizza brothers ===
Horace Hanford continued to operate the mill until 1945, when he sold it to Frank, Mike, and Joe Pizza, three brothers who worked at the business. Under the Pizza brothers' ownership, the mill focused its operations on grinding feed and running the local hardware store. The Pizzas converted one of the mill warehouses into a feed mill in 1961, likely in a last-ditch attempt to shore up the business as retail sales became concentrated in larger urban centers. The effort wasn't enough, and the brothers sold off much of the mill equipment and property in 1965. When the last Pizza brother died in 1967, the mill was expected to close.

=== Revival as museum ===
Ken Kelso, a local farmer, wanted to preserve what he saw as an important part of the region's history, and when the Pizza brothers began to auction off items in 1966 he purchased many in the interest of historic preservation. Newer equipment had a higher resale price but historic items often sold for less: Kelso purchased the water wheel for $45. The owners asked when he would remove the wheel, and in response he offered to buy the property. After the hardware store closed, Kelso opened an informal museum on the site to showcase the historic mill and its equipment.

Kelso had grand plans to make the mill a major historic destination in East Meredith, but became aware that he would need help in order to do so. In 1972 he sought to sell the mill to an owner who could further the museum project, and a number of community members came together to form a nonprofit for that purpose called the Old Mill Museum. Over the following years the museum secured its finances and in 1977 it was renamed Hanford Mills Museum in honor of the family that ran the mill for 85 years.

== National Historic District ==
Hanford Mills was listed as a historic district on the National Register of Historic Places in 1973. The district contains nine contributing buildings and three contributing structures, including both natural and structural facilities. It includes a mill race from Kortright Creek to the damned up Mill Pond which supplies the waterwheel, a spillway for the pond's overflow, a section of old (1900) New York Central Railroad track, two railroad bridges crossing Kortright Creek, and a variety of buildings. The main structure is a mill building dating to the mid-1800s with additions from the 1870s, 1880s, and 1890s. The four story wood-frame structure is approximately 150 feet long and 120 feet high. Also on the property is a one-story depot building with grain elevator and storage facilities.

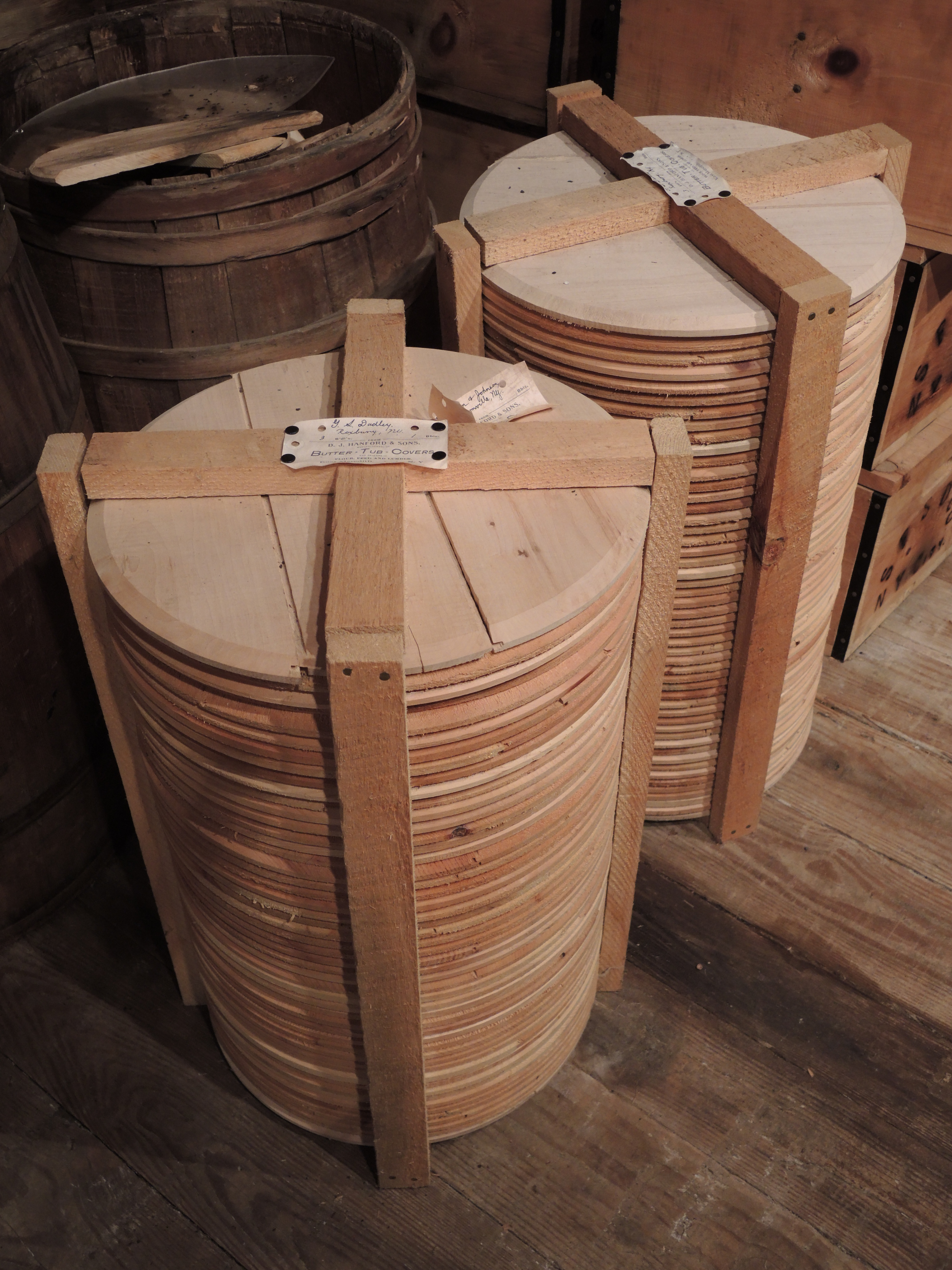

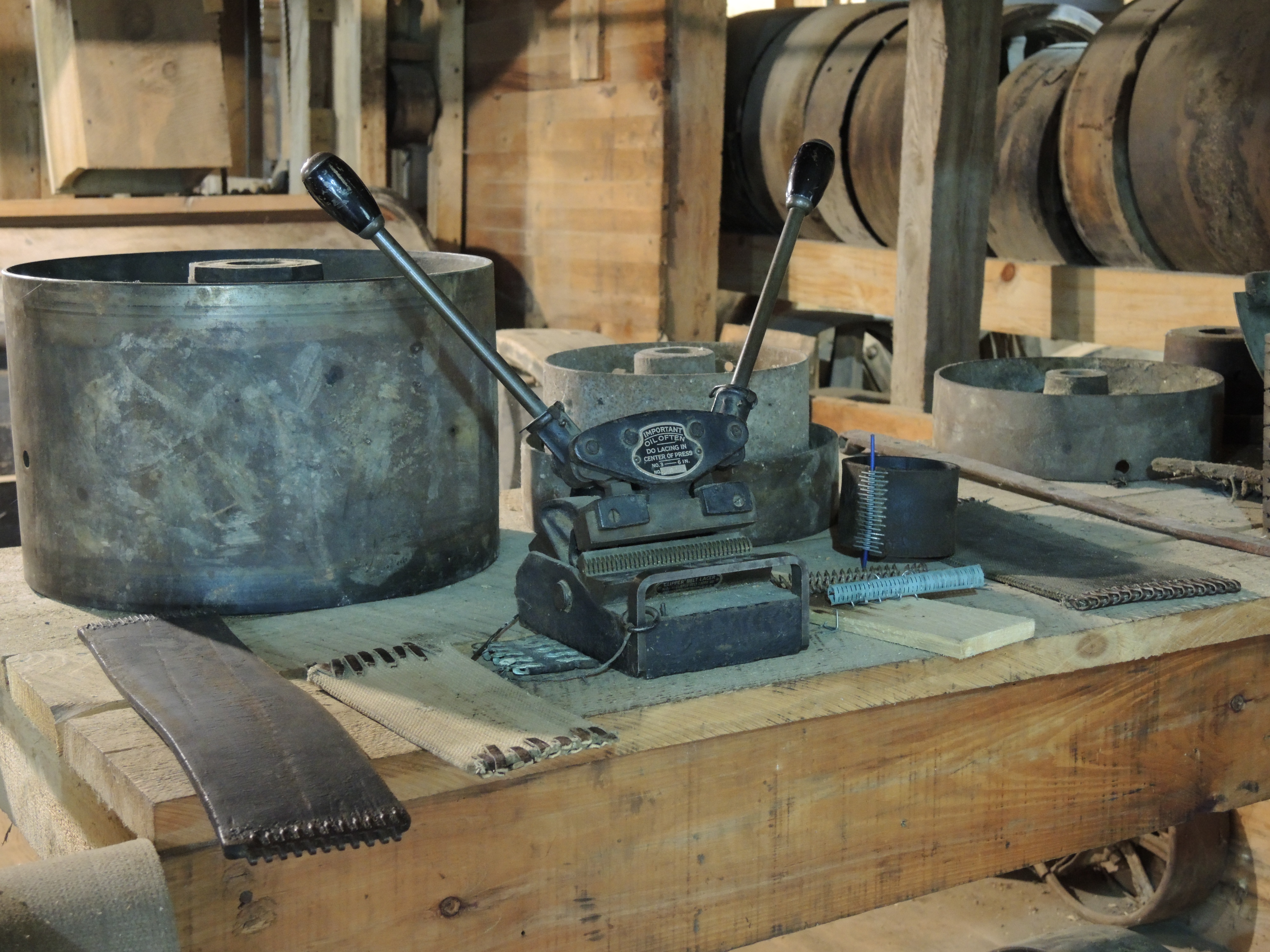

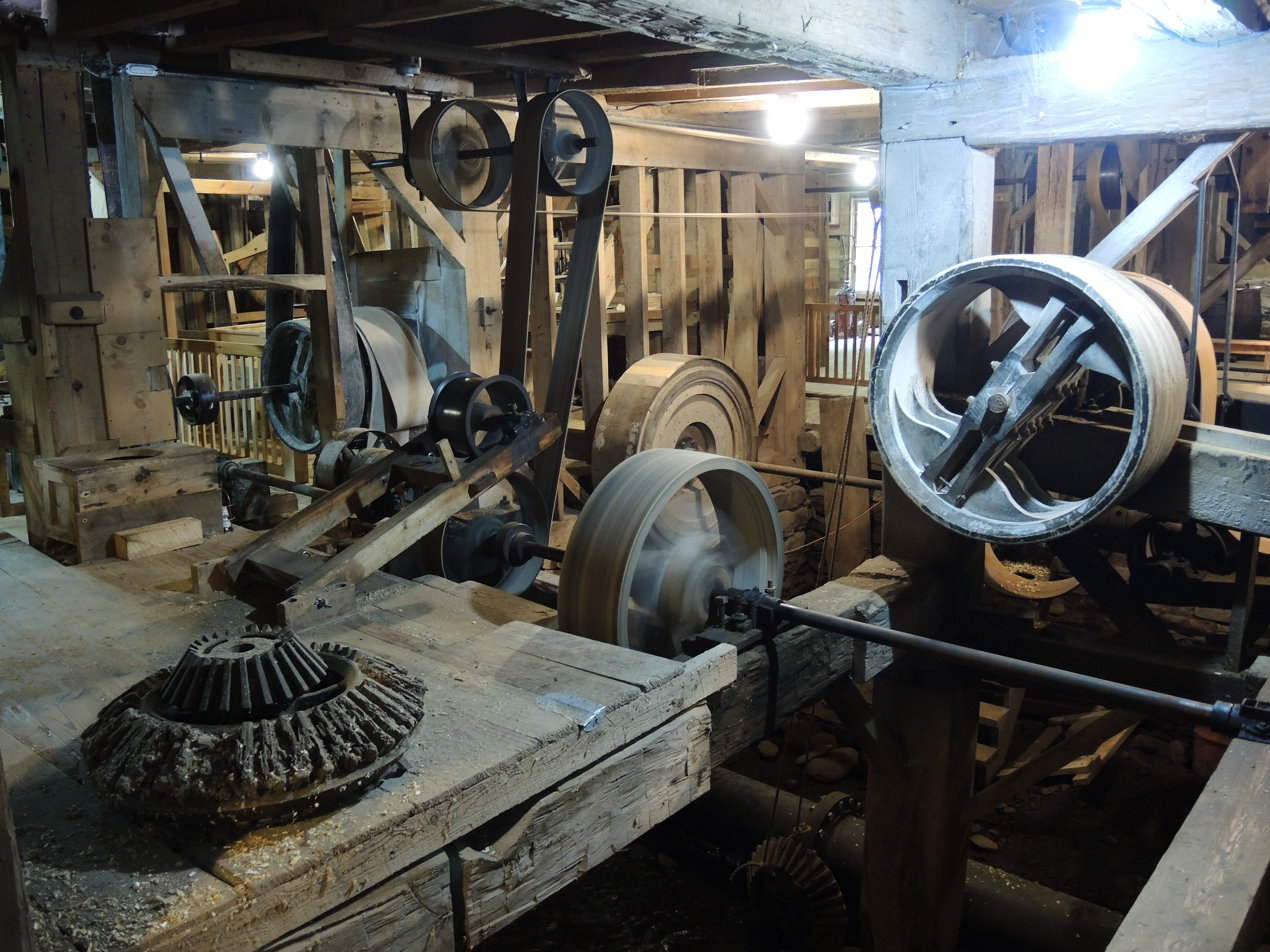

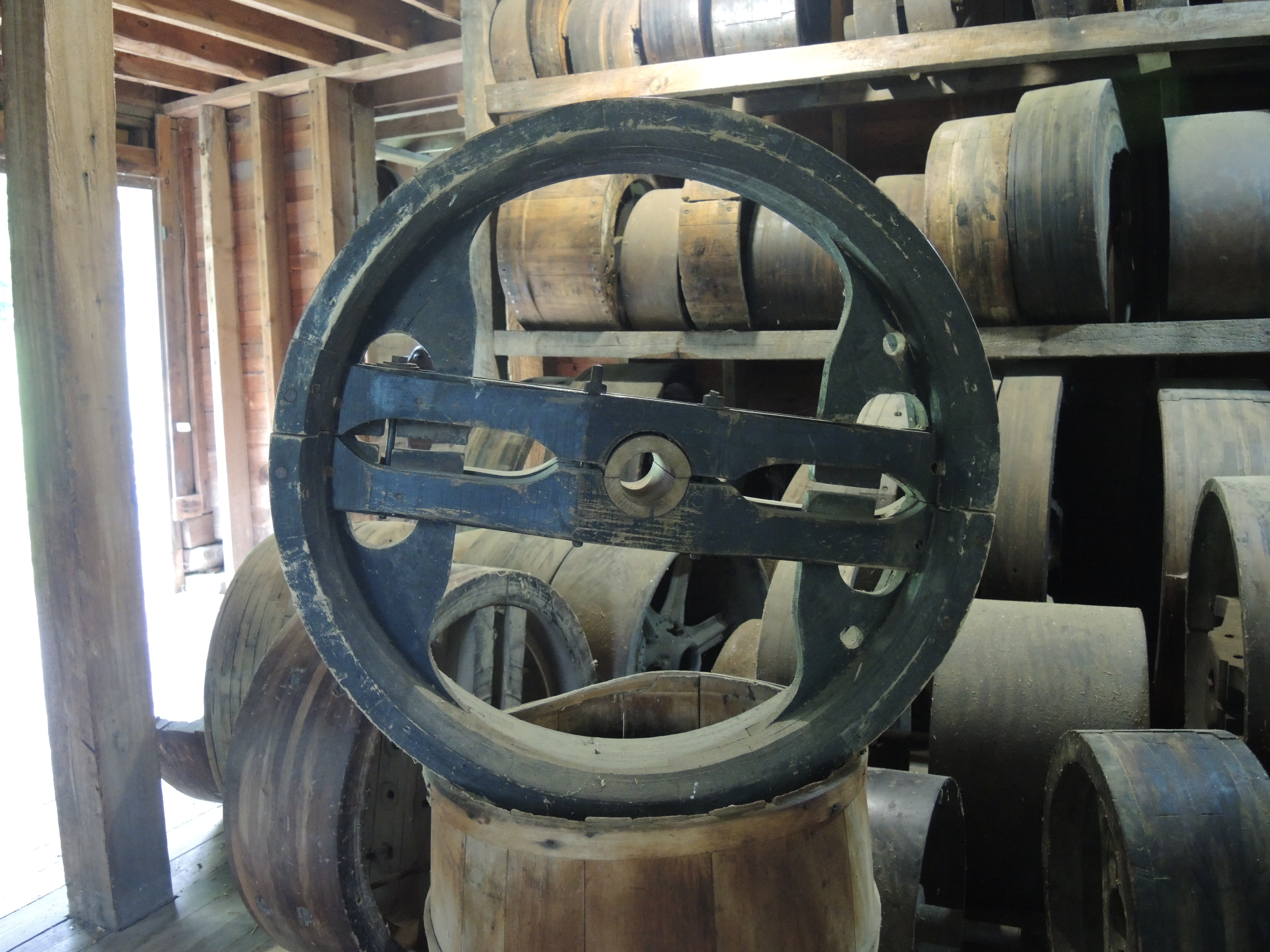

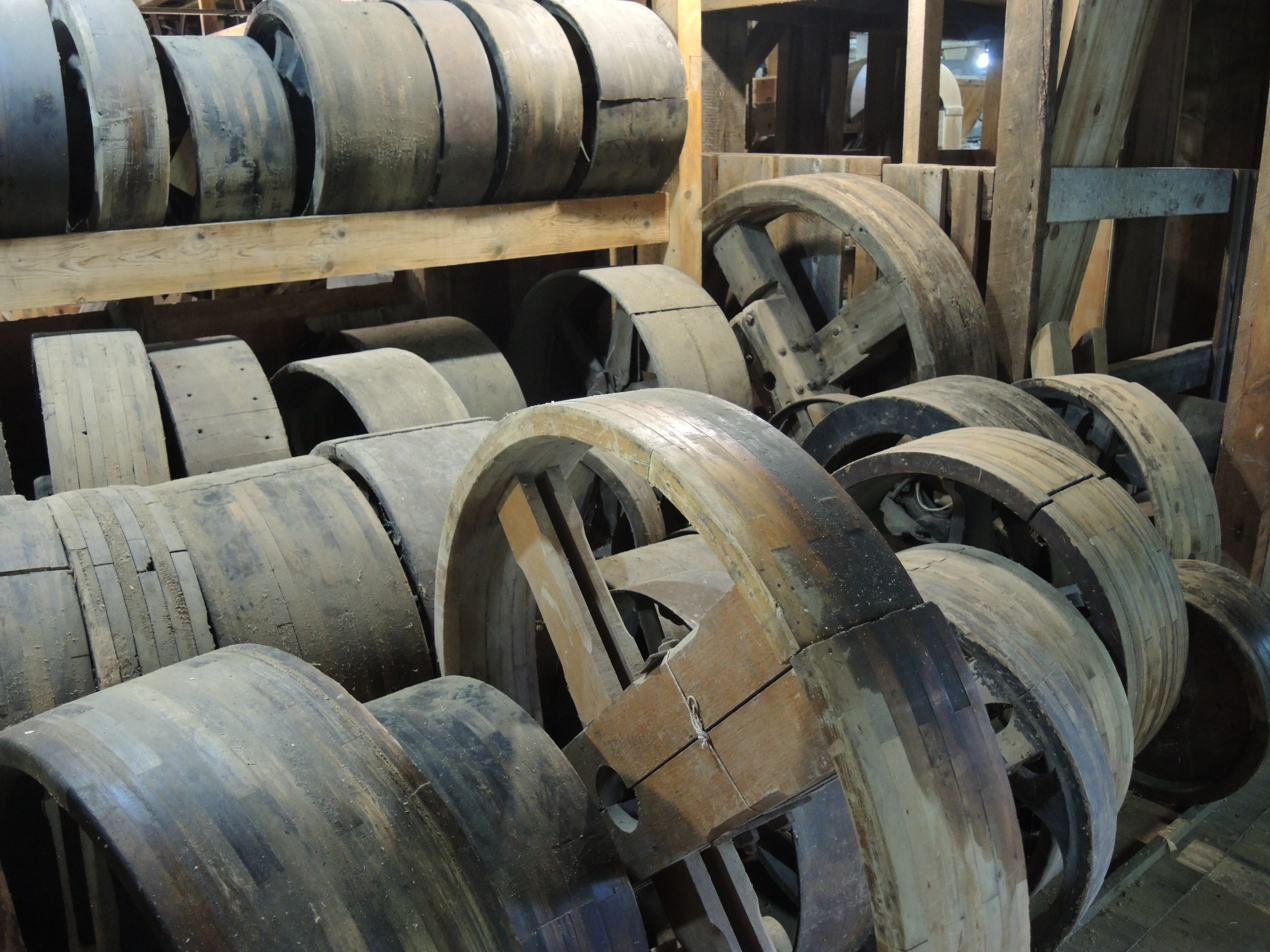

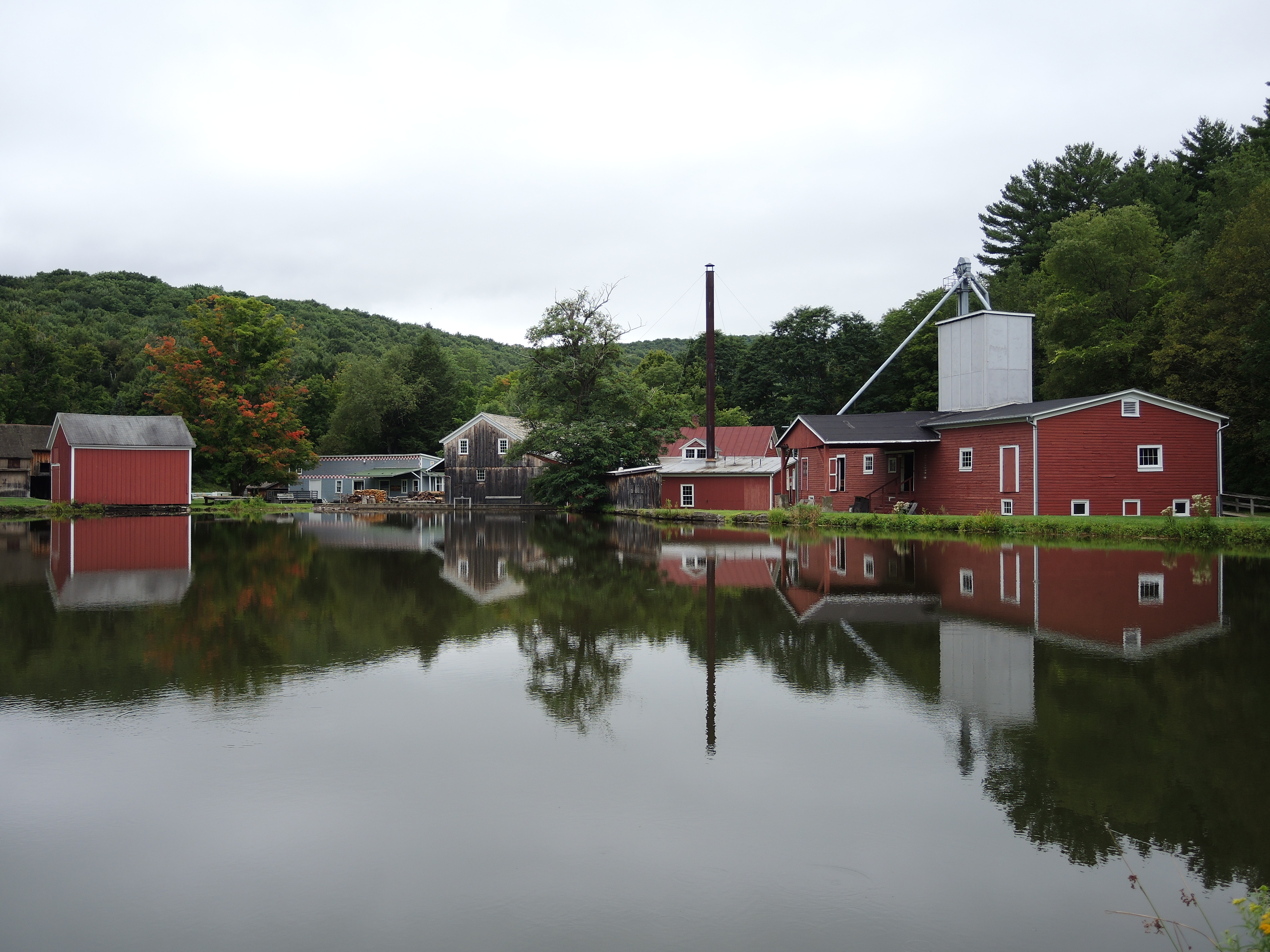

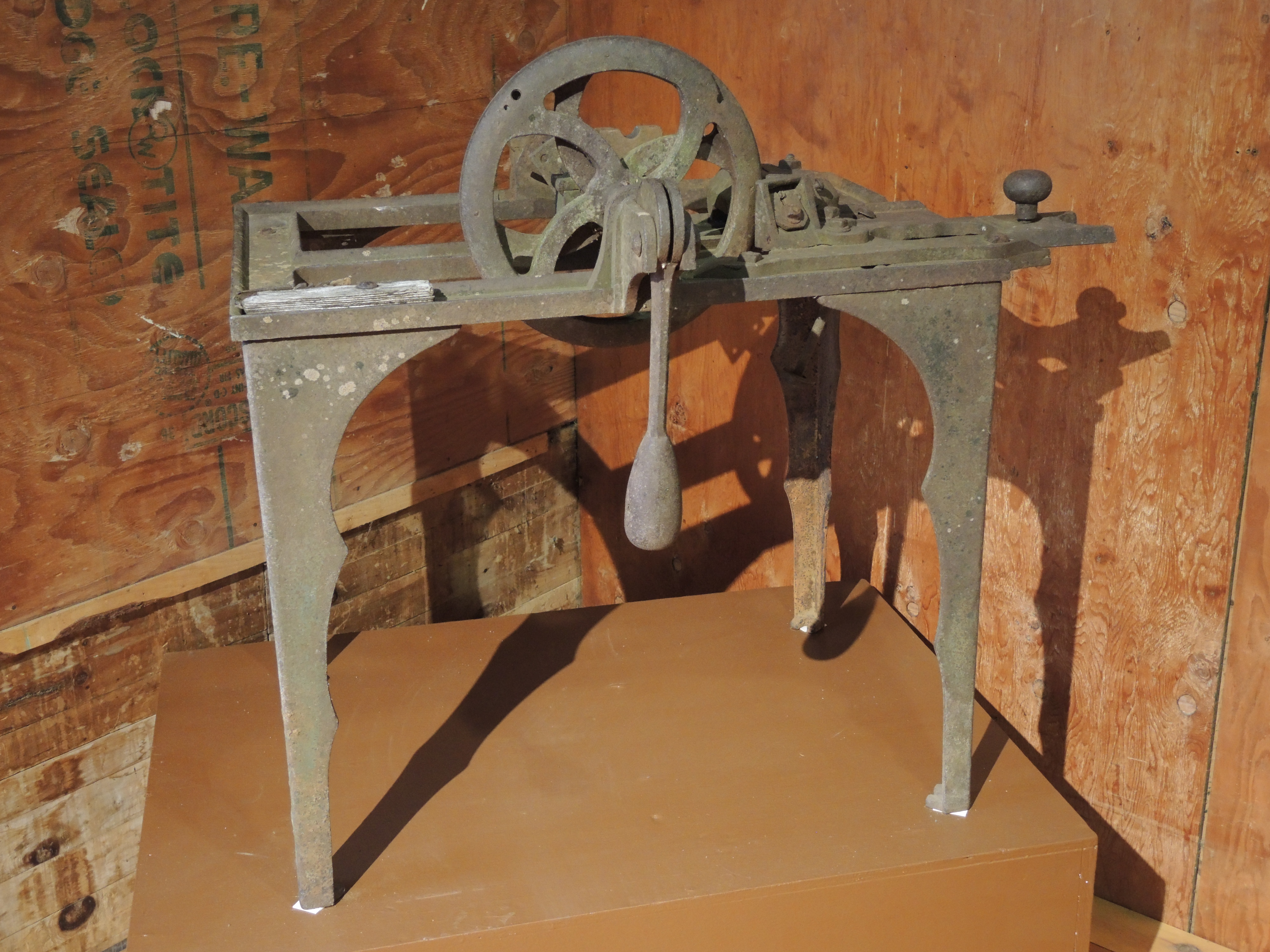

== See also ==
- National Register of Historic Places listings in Delaware County, New York
