= Kortright Creek =

River in the state of New York

- Location of the mouth of Kortright Creek

Location
- Country: United States
- State: New York
- County: Delaware

Physical characteristics
- Source
  - coordinates: 42°25′30″N 74°45′15″W
- Mouth: Charlotte Creek
  - coordinates: 42°26′52″N 74°55′30″W
  - elevation: 1,201 ft (366 m)

Basin features
- Tributaries
  - left: Mine Brook

Kortright Creek is a river in Delaware County, New York. It flows into Charlotte Creek west of Davenport Center.
