= Mine Brook =

- Location of the mouth of Mine Brook

Location
- Country: United States
- State: New York
- County: Delaware

Physical characteristics
- Source
  - coordinates: 42°24′38″N 74°55′01″W
- Mouth: Kortright Creek
  - coordinates: 42°25′25″N 74°53′16″W
  - elevation: 1,355 ft (413 m)

Mine Brook is a river in Delaware County, New York. It flows into Kortright Creek in East Meredith.
