= Frederick Arthur Bagg =

Canal Engineer

- Born: 1871; Providence, Rhode Island
- Died: March 1, 1932 (aged 60–61); Millburn, New Jersey
- Education: Rensselaer Polytechnic Institute
- Occupation: Engineer

Frederick Arthur Bagg (1871 - March 1, 1932) was the engineer who surveyed the route for the New York State Canal System. He was the chief engineer for the Johnstown, Fonda, and Gloverville Railroad.

== Biography ==
He was born in 1871 in Providence, Rhode Island. He attended the Rensselaer Polytechnic Institute. He was married to Edith Cress.

He surveyed the route for the New York State Canal System. He was the chief engineer for the Johnstown, Fonda, and Gloverville Railroad.

He then worked for the New York Central Railroad till his death on March 1, 1932, in Millburn, New Jersey. He died of heart disease.
