= Anbaric =

Anbaric may refer to:

- An archaic term for the word electrical used in the fantasy trilogy His Dark Materials by Philip Pullman
- Anbaric Transmission, an electric power company
