= Timeline of the New York, Susquehanna and Western Railway =

This is a timeline of the New York, Susquehanna and Western Railway and its direct predecessors. It also contains foundational American railroad history dates, important historical events which impacted the railroad (e.g. financial panics), and other nearby railroads' major events affecting the NYS&W.

== Timeline ==
=== 19th Century ===
- 1815
  - The first railroad charter in the United States is granted to the New Jersey Rail Road Company to link Trenton on the Delaware to New Brunswick on the Raritan, crossing the state's midsection.
- 1826
  - The Quincy Granite Railway is the first commercial railroad in the United States, though still using horses.
- 1828
  - John Langdon Sullivan surveys the first route across northern New Jersey with the intent of transporting Pennsylvania coal by rail to Paterson, New Jersey. NJ has iron but needs PA coal to smelt it.
- 1829
  - August 8: Trial run of Stourbridge Lion at Honesdale, Pennsylvania for the Delaware and Hudson Gravity Railroad. It is the first locomotive to run in the United States.
- 1830
  - August: Tom Thumb is test run between Baltimore and Relay, Maryland for the B&O. The first American-built steam locomotive to operate on a common-carrier railroad
- 1831
  - The Morris Canal opens to transport coal across North Jersey
  - December: A convention is held in Owego, New York which eventually leads to the formation of what will become the Erie Railroad the following Spring. The Erie will control the NYS&W from 1898 to 1940.
- 1832
  - March 8: The state of New Jersey charters a railroad, its fifth, based on Sullivan's 1828 survey route across the state: The New Jersey, Hudson, and Delaware (NJH&D)
  - April 24: The Erie Railroad is chartered in New York state.
- 1837
  - Panic of 1837; The NJH&D charter languishes and no work is done
- 1854
  - The Sussex Railroad opens, built by Abram Hewitt from Waterloo to Newton, to bring iron ore from Andover mines to Trenton for smelting, and service to Newton. It is the rebuilt Sussex Mine Railroad.
- 1857
  - Panic of 1857; NJH&D can't get together enough money and sells its charter to the Pennsylvania Coal Company.
- 1866
  - DeWitt Clinton Littlejohn forms the New York and Oswego Midland Railway 400 miles to the west of New York City to connect Oswego, New York with the port of New York
  - Hoboken Ridgefield & Paterson chartered on March 15
- 1867
  - NJH&D grades in Butler and Bloomingdale to preserve its charter by doing some work
  - New Jersey Western Railway chartered to build west from Paterson
  - Sussex Valley Railroad chartered to build south from the New Jersey/New York state line south to the Delaware Water Gap
- 1868
  - NYOM begins work eastward in New York state; it has no charter to build in New Jersey
- 1869
  - April 1: Hudson Connecting Railroad chartered
  - May 10: First transcontinental railroad completed
  - NJW begins building both east and west from a junction with the Erie Railroad in the Spring from Hawthorne, just across the Passaic River from Paterson. Cornelius Wortendyke is in charge.
- 1870
  - The New Jersey Western Railway becomes the New Jersey Midland Railway. This consolidates NJH&D, NJW, SVRR, Hoboken Ridgefield & Paterson, Hudson Connecting Railway.
  - December 20: the first locomotive runs on the NJM: 'Passaic' built by Rogers in Paterson
- 1871
  - NJM completes west to Butler, first train April 27
  - July 1: NJM begins 99-year lease of Middletown, Unionville & Water Gap Railroad, to connect with NYOM
- 1872
  - Combined NYOM/NJM line opens from Middletown, New York, to Jersey City; first train May 1
- 1873
  - July 9: First train runs across the railroads from Oswego, New York, to Jersey City via NJM
  - September 4: NYOM lease of NJM begins
  - October: Panic of 1873; NYOM goes into receivership on Sept. 19, Abram S. Hewitt appointed Receiver
  - November 17: NJM assumes control of the NYOM line from Jersey City to Middletown
- 1875
  - NJM falls into receivership with James McCulloh and Garret Hobart as receivers
- 1880
  - New Jersey Midland Railway reorganized out of receivership as the New Jersey Midland Railroad. Wortendyke and Littlejohn are out, Garrett Hobart is in as president.
  - The New York and Oswego Midland Railroad is reorganized out of bankruptcy as the New York, Ontario and Western Railway
- 1881
  - Each new extension of the railroad is another company: Paterson Extension Railroad, Midland Connecting Railway, New York and Scranton Construction Company in New Jersey, Pennsylvania Midland Railway in Pennsylvania
  - June 10 - July 1: NJM, Paterson Extension Railroad, Midland Connecting Railway, North Jersey Railroad, Water Gap Railroad, Pennsylvania Midland Railway all reorganize together as the first corporate incarnation of the New York, Susquehanna and Western Railroad.
  - Sussex Railroad taken over by the DL&W
  - NYSW builds at least from Beaver Lake to Branchville Junction/Warbasse/Hyper Humus
  - Frederic A. Potts is the first NYSW president
- 1882
  - First trains to Lackawanna interchange at Gravel Place, Pennsylvania run in the Fall
  - May 1: Paterson Extension Railroad opens
  - September: Lodi Branch Railroad bought, it would last until 1896 when the shorter Hackensack and Lodi Railroad was built.
- 1883
  - Blairstown Railway bought; the companies reorganize as the second corporate incarnation of the New York, Susquehanna and Western Railroad
- 1884
  - The Panic of 1884
- 1885
  - July 13: Passaic and New York Railroad (The Passaic branch) chartered; begins operating in 1886 and would last until 2020
- 1887
  - The railroad is double-tracked from Paterson to Jersey City
- 1889
  - Charles Mercer Heald replaces Frederic A. Potts as NYSW President
- 1890
  - Simon Borg replaces Charles Mercer Heald as NYSW President
- 1891
  - The shops at Wortendyke are destroyed by fire; they are rebuilt in 1892
- 1892
  - The Edgewater Branch is chartered; the terminal there opens in 1894
  - March 31: Hudson River Railroad and Terminal Co. organized to build at Edgewater; NYSW wants its own coal dock away from DL&W
  - Wilkes-Barre & Eastern Railroad chartered to build from Stroudsburg to the Wyoming Valley; begins operating in 1893
- 1893
  - The Panic of 1893: NYSW reorganizes its subsidiaries into the parent company, keeping the NYSW Railroad name; the third corporate incarnation of the railroad.
- 1894
  - The western end of the NYSW is cut back from Gravel Place to Stroudsburg
- 1895
  - Amos Lawrence Hopkins replaces Simon Borg as NYSW President
  - April 2: L&NE formed; its route includes trackage rights over 18 miles of NYSW from Hainesburg Jct north to Swartswood Jct, It lasts just over 66 years, through October 1961
- 1896
  - The Susquehanna Connecting Railroad is chartered to build from a WB&E connection at Suscon north to Minooka, Pennsylvania; it opens in 1897
  - Hackensack and Lodi Railroad built to connect to Lodi station. Original Lodi Branch Railroad abandoned in favor of this route. Fully merged into NYSW in 1953. It lasts until 2020 as the NYSW Lodi Branch.
- 1897
  - November 25: The Susquehanna Connecting Railroad is completed
- 1898
  - In January, J.P. Morgan's co. begins buying NYSW stock for the Erie Railroad. In February, Erie Leases the NYSW. In July it begins control until 1940.
  - Eben B. Thomas replaces Amos Lawrence Hopkins as NYSW president

=== 20th Century ===
- 1901
  - Panic of 1901
  - Frederick Underwood replaces Eben B. Thomas as NYSW president
- 1902
  - A fire in NYSW main office destroys corporate records
- 1911
  - NYSW moves from Pennsylvania Railroad terminal in Jersey City to the Erie terminal, with freight switching from Marion (PRR) to Croxton (ERIE) yards
- 1912
  - May 23: L&NE coal trains begin running from Hainesburg Jct. to Little Ferry, over NYSW; previously trains only ran north to Swartswood Jct.
- 1913
  - Lease of MUWGRR given up
- 1917
  - December 28: Due to World War I the United States Railroad Administration takes control of NYSW until February 29, 1920
- 1920
  - The two-year Depression of 1920-1921
  - In the next decade the Erie spends money on the NYSW, including scrapping old locomotives
  - In the next decade the decapods arrive
- 1923
  - Recovering from USRA WWI operations, NYSW posts $5.5M gross earnings, the most it had ever done, but expenses pile up
- 1926
  - John J. Bernet replaces Frederick Underwood as NYSW president
  - September 2: Kingston, Pennsylvania, western terminal of WB&E; terminal building sold due to lack of traffic
- 1929
  - May 27: Charles E. Denney replaces John J. Bernet as NYSW president
  - October: The great stock market crash begins The Great Depression
- 1935
  - Regular passenger service west of Beaver Lake ends
- 1936
  - Major areal storms and flooding
- 1937
  - Bonds due
  - First NYSW bankruptcy filing. Eventual sole trustee appointed is Walter Kidde
  - WB&E files for abandonment
- 1939
  - March 25: the last Wilkes Barre & Eastern train runs. The line is abandoned that year.
- 1940
  - March: Erie control of NYSW ends
  - NYSW opens a joint office with NYOM in Manhattan
  - Walter Kidde buys the ACF Streamliners for the NYSW, and service between Paterson and New York City begins
- 1941
  - The western end of the NYSW is cut back again; to Hainesburg from Stroudsburg
  - NYSW gets its first diesels, an order of ALCO RS-1s and ALCO S2s
- 1943
  - Walter Kidde dies, Henry K. Norton is installed to replace him as the new trustee
- 1947
  - Last NYSW steam locomotive operations on the railroad until the #142 is purchased in 1991 (though the Morris County Central would operate on a segment of the NYSW from 1974-1980)
- 1948
  - November: Last NYSW steam engines scrapped: decapods 2435 & 2492
- 1950
  - NYSW buys Budd RDCs
- 1951
  - NYSW buys stainless passenger coaches
- 1953
  - June 3: The courts declare the NYSW reorganized, now-former-trustee Henry K. Norton becomes railroad president
  - Lodi Branch fully merged into NYSW
- 1955
  - Henry K. Norton retires; is replaced as NYSW president by James M. Baths
  - July: The Ford Motor Company Edgewater Assembly Plant closes and the NYSW loses an important customer
- 1956
  - James. M. Baths is replaced as NYSW president by Ralph E. Sease
  - June: NYSW files with the New Jersey Board of Public Utility Commissioners to eliminate all passenger train service
- 1957
  - The entire New York, Ontario and Western Railway is abandoned due to the recession starting this year
  - The New York Central and the Pennsylvania Railroad begin merger talks; they would merge in 1968.
- 1958
  - NYSW financial difficulties; Stainless coaches bought just a few years before are sold off and fewer trains run overall
  - NYS&W abandons the Hanford Branch
- 1959
  - June 21: the last Sunday passenger train runs
  - New Green Pond junction is finished this year, relocating the original junction due to the creation of Charlotteburg Reservoir for the City of Newark
- 1960
  - The Paterson City branch is sold to the City of Paterson
  - June: Interchange partner L&NE files for abandonment
  - October 17: Erie and DL&W merge to form Erie Lackawanna. Passenger service eastern terminus moves from Jersey City to Susquehanna Transfer after the merger
- 1961
  - October 31: The last Lehigh and New England freight train over the NYSW; L&NE is shortly abandoned. NYSW loses its westernmost connection and customer.
- 1962
  - Real estate developer Irving W. Maidman buys control of NYS&W and replaces Ralph E. Sease as railroad president
  - Three EMD GP18s are ordered with a government loan; NYSW takes delivery in August. They have a new "yellowjacket" paint scheme which the railroad would use from then on for its freight operations
  - August 30: the last train runs west of Sparta Junction; track west of here is soon removed.
- 1963
  - February: A 9-to-0 US Supreme Court ruling keeps passenger service going on the NYSW
  - September 1: John C. Clark is elected Railroad president
- 1964
  - Deteriorating track conditions mandate the entire railroad west of Butler to a track speed of fifteen miles per hour this year
- 1965
  - Delaware Otsego Railroad formed in New York State; will eventually purchase NYSW in 1980 as the Delaware Otsego Corporation
  - October: Herbert J. Draney is elected railroad president, replacing John C. Clark.
- 1966
  - The Sparta Junction diamond is removed this year
  - June 30: The last NYSW commuter train runs with one day's notice to customers. Railroad president Irving Maidman previously offered passengers $1000 each to stop riding. 95 years of passenger service ends.
  - Irving Maidman petitions to have NYSW included in the Penn Central merger
- 1968
  - February 1: Completing a process begun in 1957, the New York Central and the Pennsylvania Railroad merge to form Penn Central, without the NYSW
  - February 29: Railroad president Herbert J. Draney retires and is replaced by William A. Logan by late March.
  - NYSW further embargoed between Sparta Junction and Oak Ridge, due to a bad bridge in Sparta
- 1969
  - NYSW seeks approval to abandon the line west of Oak Ridge. Local officials convince the ICC to deny their application at the time of its consideration in 1971.
  - March: NYSW formally withdraws its consideration for inclusion in Penn Central
- 1970
  - June 21: Penn Central files for bankruptcy
- 1971
  - May: The Jersey Central files to abandon its line to Green Pond, the Wharton and Northern.
  - August 28-29: Tropical Storm Doria hits New Jersey exceptionally hard with railfall amounts exceeding ten inches, causing a washout near the Smoke Rise entrance grade crossing. This severs the NYSW interchange with CNJ at Green Pond Junction. The NYSW embargoes 25 miles of track west of Butler
- 1972
  - June: The Erie Lackawanna Railroad goes bankrupt, in part due to the effects of Hurricane Agnes
- 1973
  - 1973 oil crisis; global oil prices rise
- 1974
  - April: The Morris County Central (MCC) railroad begins running tourist trains over the 1971-washout-isolated section of NYSW track, basing operations at Newfoundland, running until 1980.
  - May: Poughkeepsie Bridge burns, changing how trains would be routed in the area
- 1976
  - January 20: NYSW's second bankruptcy filing, due to defaulting on New Jersey taxes.
  - April 1: Conrail begins operations (see also: List of companies transferred to Conrail)
  - April 1: Delaware Otsego begins operating The Stourbridge Line as the Lackawaxen and Stourbridge Railroad until 1989, eventually using some NYSW power
  - Walter G. Scott is appointed trustee, replacing Irving Maidman
- 1978
  - An FRA inspection leads to a band on shipments of placarded (hazardous) material over the railroad
  - NJDOT enters into agreement with NYSW to rehab the railroad
  - MCC stores steam locomotive no. 385 at Newfoundland, where it will sit until 1989
- 1979
  - 1979 oil crisis
  - July: NYSW court-ordered abandonment and selloff
- 1980
  - DO is asked by federal and state officials to bid on the NYSW. Their offer of $5 Million is accepted by the court in June.
  - September 2: Delaware Otsego Corporation takes over NYSW operations on the 27-mile main line and four NJ branches under a one-year lease agreement. The branches are to Croxton, Edgewater, Passaic, and Lodi. The Suscon and Winton branches in PA are also included. Winton branch later torn up and rail reused on the Fonda, Johnstown and Gloversville Railroad. With Walter Rich as president, the New York, Susquehanna and Western Railroad becomes NYS&W Railway Corporation, the fourth corporate incarnation of the railroad. Full transfer of all assets is scheduled for 1981, but will not happen until 1982. DO keeps existing NYSW management and 25 operations and mechanical employees.
  - DO creates a real estate unit tasked with finding sources of income from existing NYSW-owned properties, as well as new shippers — it is to become Susquehanna Properties, Inc. by 1983. It is this unit which negotiates the Sea Land sale in 1985.
  - October 31: A "Rededication Train" runs, with the mayor of Hawthorne even rechristening the railroad
  - NYSW has 70 shippers and DO-run NYSW runs 8000 carloads in their first year of operations
  - MCC ends its tourist operations on the NYSW
- 1981
  - Conrail signifies it intends to abandon certain lines in accordance with the Staggers Rail Act, including what will become the Syracuse and Utica branches. DO contacts shippers along these lines to secure business, and begins negotiations to purchase the lines and have NYSW operate over them.
- 1982
  - DO purchases the Syracuse and Utica branches from Conrail, 157 miles total, combined in a package deal with 15 miles of former L&HR from Warwick NY to Franklin NJ, 5.6 miles of former Erie-nee-New York and Greenwood Lake trackage at Pompton Junction (the new Pompton Industrial), and a trackage rights/haulage rate agreement over 200 miles of Conrail to connect the new Northern Division to NJ. Closing on the properties is April 16, with the cost totaling $4.2 Million, and the first train running the next day.
  - Used ALCO C420s 2000, 2002, and RS3 104 bought for locomotive power on the new Northern Division. GP18 1804 sent north as well
  - Passenger excursions begin on the Northern Division; they would run for two years
  - NYSW buys five ALCO C430s from Conrail - 3000-3008 (evens) - ex New York Central
- 1983
  - A year-long project begins to bring Utica line up to 40 MPH standards
  - July 16: The first haulage train between Passaic Junction and Binghamton over the Southern Tier operates
- 1984
  - DO begins negotiating with Sea-Land to run a segment of transcontinental double-stack trains. Sea-Land later signs a 20-year lease on 22 acres in Little Ferry, selecting C&O, D&H, NYSW to run trains from Chicago to Little Ferry on a five-year contract
- 1985
  - DO buys 8 to 9 mi of Conrail-abandoned L&HR from Franklin to Lime Crest, and the Ogdensburg branch. 28 miles of L&HR south from Lime Crest to Belvidere are scrapped
  - March: NYSW operations begin along Sparta Junction to Warwick section after DO reopens abandoned L&HR track from Franklin to Warwick
  - DO assumes operation of SIRY as an NYSW subsidiary, 16.5 miles from Cranford to St. George, reporting ten customers in 1988
  - August 4: First NYSW Sea-Land intermodal train from Binghamton to Little Ferry as part of two sets: one between Little Ferry and Tacoma, and one between Little Ferry and Long Beach
- 1986
  - January: The first four used EMD SD45s are bought for container train service, 6360, 6362, 6364, 6366
  - March: DO begins operating the Rahway Valley RR under contract after RV finds it is unable to obtain its own operating insurance
  - NYSW begins to reopen the original main line in the Spring
  - Conrail signals its intent to raise haulage rates which triggers a trackage rights clause in the 1982 purchase agreement, DO rehabs the NYSW main instead of paying more to them
  - April 1: Conrail cancels its 1982 contract and enables DO to have the NYS&W rebuild its idle former main line across New Jersey in just six months, costing $8 Million
  - A new connection is built at Sparta Junction between the NYSW and former L&HR. A new simpler connection at Maybrook is planned to simplify movements there
  - October 15: The first train using the new rehabbed main runs.
  - October-November: Four more ex-BN SD45s and two EMD F45s are delivered.
- 1987
  - January: Five more ex-BN SD45s are delivered, one renumbered to 6361, the rest run with BN numbering.
  - Conrail rehabs the former L&HR line from Warwick north
  - By late 1987 the only ALCO left in operation on NSYW is C430 3000
- 1988
  - The GE Dash 8-40Bs begin to arrive, numbers starting 4002. Leased with CSX-backed financing, they are the first new locomotives since 1962's GP18s. The railroad will eventually have twenty-four of them at peak to assist with the new container traffic.
  - The NYSW is named operator of the Delaware and Hudson Railway after the D&H goes bankrupt
- 1989
  - May 27: MCC steam locomotive no. 385 is moved from Newfoundland, where it sat since 1978, to Little Ferry. It will eventually end up at the Whippany Railway Museum.
  - June 30: Delaware Otsego stops operating the LASB after thirteen years
- 1999
  - June 1: Conrail is officially broken up between NS and CSX

=== 21st Century ===
- 2007
  - Walter Rich dies and is succeeded as railroad president by Nathan Fenno
- 2020
  - NYSW formally files for abandonment of the Lodi and Passaic branches
- 2024
  - Nathan Fenno is succeeded by James Bonner as railroad president

== Railroad name abbreviations ==
NYSW/NYS&W = New York, Susquehanna and Western	USRA = United States Railroad Administration
NJH&D = New Jersey, Hudson and Delaware	ERIE = Erie Railroad
NYOM = New York and Oswego Midland Railroad	L&NE = Lehigh and New England Railroad
NJW = New Jersey Western	EL = Erie Lackawanna
SVRR = Sussex Valley Railroad	CNJ = Central Railroad of New Jersey
NJM = New Jersey Midland Railway	LASB = Lackawaxen and Stourbridge Railroad
NYOW = New York, Ontario and Western Railway	DO = Delaware Otsego
DL&W = Delaware, Lackawanna and Western Railroad	MCC = Morris County Central
PRR = Pennsylvania Railroad	NS = Norfolk Southern
SCRR = Susquehanna Connecting Railroad	D&H = Delaware and Hudson Railway
WB&E = Wilkes Barre and Eastern Railroad	SIRY = Staten Island Railway
MUWGRR = Middletown, Unionville and Water Gap Railroad	L&HR = Lehigh and Hudson River Railway

== Bibliography ==
- Lucas, Walter Arndt (1980) [1939]. The History of the New York, Susquehanna and Western Railroad (second ed.). Railroadians of America. LCCN 82163920.
- Schmitt, James C. (2009). Historic Rails of the New York, Susquehanna & Western Railroad. West Milford, New Jersey: Tinfoil Rose Design, LLC. ISBN 9780615313849.
- Krause, John; Crist, Ed (1991). Susquehanna: New York, Susquehanna & Western RR. Newton, New Jersey: Carstens Publications. ISBN 9780911868807.
- Mohowski, Robert E. (2003). The New York, Susquehanna & Western Railroad. Baltimore: Johns Hopkins University Press. ISBN 9780801872228.
- Karlewicz, Ken; Hartley, Scott (1987). Susquehanna: From Shortlines to Stackpacks. Piscataway, New Jersey: Railpace Company, Inc. LCCN 87020698.
- Rutan, Dave; Mohowski, Robert E. (2013). Remember the Sussex Branch of the Lackawanna Railroad. Franklin, New Jersey: Dave Rutan. ISBN 9781304169310.
- Zullig, Walter E., Jr.; Holtz, Albert T. (2009). Susquehanna Trackside 1954-1968. Scotch Plains, New Jersey: Morning Sun Books, Inc. ISBN 9781582484105.
- Kaminski, Edward S. (2010). New York, Susquehanna & Western Railroad in New Jersey (Images of Rail). Charleston, South Carolina: Arcadia Publishing. ISBN 9780738573670.
- Drury, George H. (1994). The Historical Guide to North American Railroads: Histories, Figures, and Features of more than 160 Railroads Abandoned or Merged since 1930. Waukesha, Wisconsin: Kalmbach Media. ISBN 9780890240724.
- Tupaczewski, Paul R. (2002). New York, Susquehanna and Western In Color. Scotch Plains, New Jersey: Morning Sun Books, Inc. ISBN 9781582480701.
- Franz, Jon (August 1989). "On The Cover: Morris County Central 2-8-0 #385". Block Line: Tri-State Chapter Newsmagazine. Vol. 16, no. 9. National Railway Historical Society, Tri-State Chapter. Archived from the original on 7 July 2015.
- Hartley, Scott (January 1988). "The Delaware Otsego Story". Trains: The Magazine of Railroading. Vol. 48, no. 3. Kalmbach Publishing Co.
- Bell, J. Snowden (1912). The Early Motive Power of the Baltimore and Ohio Railroad. New York City: Angus Sinclair Co.
- Erie (1951). Erie Railroad: Its Beginnings and Today. Erie Railroad Company.
- Wolmar, Christian (2012). The Great Railroad Revolution. PublicAffairs. ISBN 978-1-61039-179-5.
- Boyd, Jim (May 1987). "Stack Trains on the Susquehanna". Railfan & Railroad. Vol. 6, no. 9. Carstens Publications.
- Rowland, Jim (2026). "Conquering Sparta: Part 1". Railfan & Railroad. Vol. 45, no. 11. White River Productions, Inc.
