= Pine Lake (Delaware County, New York) =

Lake in Delaware County, New York, United States

- Location of Pine Lake within New York
- Location: Delaware County, New York
- Coordinates: 42°26′50″N 74°55′43″W
- Basin countries: United States
- Surface area: 13 acres (5.3 ha)
- Surface elevation: 1,214 ft (370 m)
- Settlements: West Davenport

Pine Lake is a small lake located east of the hamlet of West Davenport in Delaware County, New York. Pine Lake drains south via an unnamed creek which flows into Charlotte Creek.

== See also ==
- List of lakes in New York
