= Prosser Hollow Brook =

- Location of the mouth of Prosser Hollow Brook

Location
- Country: United States
- State: New York
- County: Delaware

Physical characteristics
- Source
  - coordinates: 42°25′24″N 74°56′54″W
- Mouth: Charlotte Creek
  - coordinates: 42°26′29″N 74°59′22″W

Prosser Hollow Brook is a river in Delaware County, New York. It flows into Charlotte Creek west-southwest of Davenport Center.
