= Anbaric Development Partners =

American electric development company

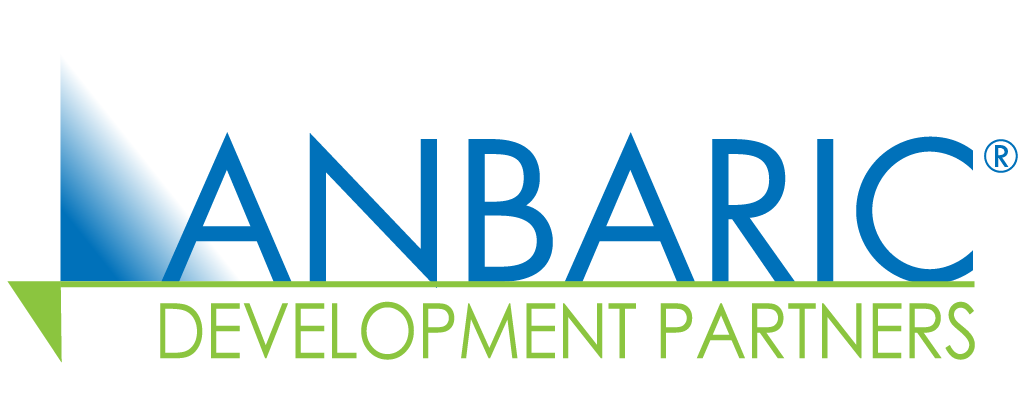
- Type: Private
- Industry: Energy
- Founded: 2004
- Founder: Edward Krapels
- Headquarters: Wakefield, Massachusetts, United States
- Key people: Clarke Bruno (CEO); Janice Fuller (President, Mid-Atlantic); Peter Shattuck (President, New England)
- Products: Transmission battery storage
- Website: anbaric.com

Anbaric Development Partners (Anbaric) is an American electric power transmission and storage development company. The company develops smart grid, renewable energy, and large-scale electric transmission projects which use high-voltage direct current (HVDC) technology for clients in the United States and internationally.

The company is headquartered in Wakefield, Massachusetts.

== History ==
=== 2004-2010 ===
Anbaric Transmission, LLC was incorporated in 2004 by founder Edward Krapels.

Anbaric delivers power from energy producers to population centers through the use of underground and submarine transmission lines. Anbaric specializes in the development stages of transmission projects including conceiving, designing, and leading projects' proposal processes. Customers include governments, investor-owned utilities, and public power generators.

In 2001, Krapels began work as a market advisor for Atlantic Energy Partners on a project known as the Neptune Regional Transmission System, a submarine transmission connection between New Jersey and Long Island. Krapels has stated that he obtained an ownership interest in the project, from which he founded Anbaric in order to focus on such transmission projects. Anbaric was then part of the merchant group that developed the Neptune RTS project, which was completed in 2007. In the late 2000s the company, along with other partners, completed additional projects including the Hudson Transmission System, which brings power from northern New Jersey to New York.

=== 2011-2026 ===
In February 2015, Anbaric announced plans to develop a series of microgrids in New York State in response to New York's call for more distributed generation resources and increased energy reliability. Anbaric has partnered with Exelon Corporation to build 10-200 megawatt microgrids in New York.

In March 2017, Anbaric and Ontario Teachers' Pension Plan created a new development company, Anbaric Development Partners. The partnership was formed to develop clean energy infrastructure projects in North America, with Anbaric's management team leading the new company and Ontario Teachers’ committing to funding development costs, projected to produce $2 billion in fully constructed assets. The announcement marked the largest financial commitment by an investor in the company's 15-year history.

== Key people ==
Clark Bruno is President and CEO. Janice Fuller is in charge of all mid-Atlantic development, Peter Shattuck who leads transmission development in New England, and project managers Bryan Sanderson, and Howard Kosel. Luis Ortiz heads up electric battery storage development. Edward N. Krapels Ph.D. was the founder of Anbaric Holding, LLC, the parent company of Anbaric. Krapels died in 2020.

== Projects ==
Anbaric's projects include the design and development of power transmission and distributed generation energy projects. Its completed projects include the Neptune Regional Transmission System and the Hudson Transmission System, while ongoing projects in development include the Bay State Offshore Wind Transmission System, Vermont Green Line, Maine Green Line, West Point Project, and Poseidon Project.

=== Neptune Regional Transmission System ===
The Neptune Cable, or the Neptune Regional Transmission System, is a 660-MW high-voltage direct current line that connects Sayreville, New Jersey (site of the Sayreville Energy Center) to Long Island. Construction on the $600 million project began in fall 2005. The 65-mile transmission line became operational in June 2007, and was developed by a merchant group including Anbaric. As of 2007, the line was the largest source of imported electricity to Long Island. In a 2007 report, the New York ISO noted that the Neptune cable reduced electricity prices in New York, and substantially reduced transmission congestion into Long Island and New York City.

=== The Hudson Transmission System ===
The Hudson Project, or the Hudson Transmission System, is project developed by a partnership including Anbaric. It consists of a 660-MW high-voltage direct current system which connects upstate New Jersey and Manhattan by traveling beneath the Hudson River. The cable carries power from an electrical substation in Ridgefield Park, New Jersey (site of the Bergen Generating Station) to one located on West 49th Street, New York and provides enough power for 400,000 homes. The project was completed in 2013 and cost approximately $850 million.

== Projects under development ==
=== Microgrids ===
Anbaric's target microgrid customers include real estate buildings, hospitals, industrial facilities, government buildings, and municipalities throughout New York. In the summer of 2015, Anbaric was part of a team that received funding from New York State's NY Prize program to conduct microgrid feasibility studies in the Village of Freeport and Staten Island University Hospital.

=== Bay State Offshore Wind Transmission System ===
By November 2011, Anbaric had filed an interconnection request with ISO New England for the Bay State Offshore Wind Transmission System. The planned project consists of two 1,000-MW HVDC lines and, if approved, would be New England's first offshore transmission trunk line.

=== West Point Project ===
West Point Partners, LLC, a subsidiary of Anbaric, submitted a proposal in June, 2013 to the New York Public Service Commission to create an 80-mile power line which would run beneath the Hudson River to bring power to the New York metro area. The line would carry 1,000-MW of power from wind, solar, and natural gas producers. Estimated costs of the project are around $900 million. Anbaric's partner, PowerBridge LLC, is developing the line. The project would have interconnected the grid from a substation in Athens, New York to a substation near the Indian Point Energy Center, but was tabled when the landowner where the southern converter station would be located, Con Edison, sold the land to the Village of Buchanan. The Village of Buchanan then sold the rights to use the land to the natural gas company Spectra for their new proposed natural gas pipeline.

=== Poseidon Project ===
Anbaric subsidiary Poseidon Transmission, LLC, filed an application in October 2013 with the New York Public Service Commission to begin construction on the Poseidon Project. This project seeks to bring 500-MW of power to the Long Island power grid via an underground high-voltage direct current transmission cable which would connect the Deans Substation in South Brunswick, New Jersey to the Ruland Road Substation in Huntington, New York.

=== Vermont Green Line ===
As of May 2013, the Vermont Green Line has been proposed by GII Development LLC, a subsidiary of Anbaric Holdings LLC managing the project. The proposal followed an April 2013 Customer Open Solicitation carried out by GII Development as per new guidelines issued by the Federal Energy Regulatory Commission. The solicitation received a strong response from energy producers with requests for transmission in excess of the lines potential capacity. If approved, the line would travel under Lake Champlain and carry 400-MW of electricity from Plattsburgh, New York to a Vermont Electric Power Company substation located in New Haven, Vermont. The company has begun the process of seeking permits from New York, Vermont, and the United States Army Corps of Engineers, which could take up to two years.

=== Maine Green Line ===
On December 9, 2014, Anbaric and National Grid announced the formation of Green Line Infrastructure Alliance. The Alliance aims to provide benefits to New England's energy consumers by providing consumers with access to large-scale, cost-effective sources of renewable and zero-emission energy; diversifying the region's energy portfolio, thereby easing the constraints on the natural gas pipeline system and providing access to affordable clean energy; enabling the New England states to meet all current clean energy targets by 2020 at affordable prices and enhancing the reliability and resilience of the region's power grid.

The Alliance's first project will be Maine Green Line, a hybrid land-and-sea HVDC project that will initially deliver 1,000MW of wind from northern Maine, firmed up by imports of hydropower from eastern Canada, via a submarine cable to Massachusetts. Maine-based constructor Cianbro Development Corporation will be a part of this project. Connecticut-based PowerBridge has been part of the Maine Green Line Development team.

=== NY and NJ Ocean Grid ===
Anabaric has submitted a proposal to develop the New York-New Jersey Wind Energy Transmission Line
