= Tedle Brook =

- Location of the mouth of Tedle Brook

Location
- Country: United States
- State: New York
- County: Delaware

Physical characteristics
- Source
  - coordinates: 42°29′24″N 74°44′13″W
- Mouth: Middle Brook
  - coordinates: 42°27′23″N 74°46′43″W
  - elevation: 1,391 ft (424 m)

Tedle Brook is a river in Delaware County, New York. It flows into Middle Brook northwest of North Kortright.
