= Keyser Brook =

- Location of the mouth of Keyser Brook

Location
- Country: United States
- State: New York
- County: Delaware

Physical characteristics
- Source
  - coordinates: 42°31′22″N 74°48′13″W
- Mouth: Charlotte Creek
  - coordinates: 42°29′23″N 74°48′24″W
  - elevation: 1,283 ft (391 m)

Keyser Brook is a river in Delaware County, New York and Otsego County, New York. It flows into Charlotte Creek east-northeast of Davenport.
