= Center Brook (Middle Brook tributary) =

- Location of the mouth of Center Brook

Location
- Country: United States
- State: New York
- County: Delaware

Physical characteristics
- Source
  - coordinates: 42°27′33″N 74°37′34″W
- Mouth: Middle Brook
  - coordinates: 42°26′53″N 74°45′26″W
  - elevation: 1,424 ft (434 m)

Center Brook is a river in Delaware County, New York and Schoharie County, New York. It flows into Middle Brook northwest of North Kortright.
