= Clapper Hollow Creek =

- Location of the mouth of Clapper Hollow Creek Clapper Hollow Creek (the United States)

Location
- Country: United States
- State: New York
- County: Schoharie

Physical characteristics
- Source
  - coordinates: 42°30′57″N 74°38′35″W
- Mouth: Charlotte Creek
  - coordinates: 42°31′24″N 74°41′59″W
  - elevation: 1,440 ft (440 m)

Clapper Hollow Creek is a river in Schoharie County, New York. It flows into Charlotte Creek southwest of Charlotteville. Part of the creek flows through the 818-acre (3.31 km^{2}) Clapper Hollow State Forest, which was purchased by the state in the 1930s.

== Fishing ==
Clapper Hollow Creek is a classified trout stream. The brook can be accessed via a parking area approximately one mile (1.6 km) west of State Route 10 on Cottage Road.
