= Davenport, New York =

- Town
- Seal

- Location within New York Location within the United States
- Coordinates: 42°26′53″N 74°55′19″W
- Country: United States
- State: New York
- County: Delaware

Government
  - Type: Town Council
  - Town Supervisor: Dennis Valente (D)
  - Town Council: Members' List: • Trevor Bell (D); • Mary F. Massaro (D); • William Hansen (R); • Kathleen Moore (R)

Area
  - Total: 51.91 sq mi (134.45 km^{2})
  - Land: 51.56 sq mi (133.55 km^{2})
  - Water: 0.35 sq mi (0.90 km^{2})
- Elevation: 1,240 ft (378 m)

Population (2020)
  - Total: 2,955
- Time zone: UTC-5 (Eastern (EST))
  - Summer (DST): UTC-4 (EDT)
- ZIP Codes: 13750 (Davenport); 13751 (Davenport Center); 13860 (West Davenport); 13757 (East Meredith); 13820 (Oneonta); 12155 (Schenevus)
- Area code: 607
- FIPS code: 36-025-19763
- GNIS feature ID: 0978887
- Website: www.davenportny.com

Davenport is a town in Delaware County, New York, United States. The population was 2,955 at the 2020 census. The town is in the northeastern part of the county.

== History ==
The town was formed in 1817 from part of the towns of Kortright and Meredith. Davenport is named after an early settler, John Davenport, who also became the first town supervisor.

== Geography ==
The northern town line is the border of Otsego County.

According to the United States Census Bureau, the town has a total area of 51.9 square miles (134.5 km^{2}), of which 51.5 square miles (133.5 km^{2}) is land and 0.3 square miles (0.9 km^{2}), or 0.67%, is water.

Charlotte Valley Central School is the only public school in Davenport. There are two volunteer fire departments in the town, as well as four churches, three post offices and one traffic light. There are four hamlets within the borders of the town: Davenport, Davenport Center, West Davenport and Fergusonville. Other places located in Davenport are Pindars Corners, Butts Corners, and Hoseaville.

== Demographics ==
Historical population
Census	Pop.	Note	%±
1820	1,384		—
1830	1,780		28.6%
1840	2,052		15.3%
1850	2,305		12.3%
1860	2,362		2.5%
1870	2,187		−7.4%
1880	1,939		−11.3%
1890	1,789		−7.7%
1900	1,620		−9.4%
1910	1,427		−11.9%
1920	1,313		−8.0%
1930	1,197		−8.8%
1940	1,240		3.6%
1950	1,233		−0.6%
1960	1,261		2.3%
1970	1,617		28.2%
1980	1,971		21.9%
1990	2,438		23.7%
2000	2,773		13.7%
2010	2,965		6.9%
2020	2,955		−0.3%
U.S. Decennial Census

As of the census of 2020, there were 2,955 people, 1,252 households, and 401 families residing in the town. The population density was 56.93 inhabitants per square mile (21.98/km^{2}). There were 1,593 housing units at an average density of 30.69 per square mile (11.85/km^{2}). The racial makeup of the town was 90.62% White, 1.15% African American, 0.24% Native American, 0.78% Asian, 1.35% from other races, and 5.82% from two or more races. Hispanic or Latino of any race were 3.72% of the population.

As of the census of 2000, there were 2,774 people, 1,132 households, and 758 families residing in the town. The population density was 53.0 inhabitants per square mile (20.5/km^{2}). There were 1,478 housing units at an average density of 28.2 per square mile (10.9/km^{2}). The racial makeup of the town was 97.98% White, 0.54% African American, 0.32% Native American, 0.25% Asian, 0.22% from other races, and 0.68% from two or more races. Hispanic or Latino of any race were 1.01% of the population.

There were 1,132 households, out of which 30.9% had children under the age of 18 living with them, 53.0% were married couples living together, 9.7% had a female householder with no husband present, and 33.0% were non-families. 25.0% of all households were made up of individuals, and 10.6% had someone living alone who was 65 years of age or older. The average household size was 2.45 and the average family size was 2.93.

In the town, the population was spread out, with 24.9% under the age of 18, 6.9% from 18 to 24, 27.0% from 25 to 44, 27.3% from 45 to 64, and 14.0% who were 65 years of age or older. The median age was 40 years. For every 100 females, there were 99.6 males. For every 100 females age 18 and over, there were 96.3 males.

The median income for a household in the town was $33,676, and the median income for a family was $37,917. Males had a median income of $28,348 versus $22,895 for females. The per capita income for the town was $20,075. About 6.6% of families and 10.1% of the population were below the poverty line, including 11.8% of those under age 18 and 3.8% of those age 65 or over.

== Communities and locations in Davenport ==
- Butts Corners – a hamlet east of Davenport village on Route 23.
- Davenport – the hamlet of Davenport on Route 23.
- Davenport Center – a hamlet between Davenport and West Davenport.
- Fergusonville – a historic location north of Davenport village.
- Hoseaville – a hamlet east of Davenport village on Route 23.
- West Davenport – a hamlet in the western part of the town.
- Pindars Corners – a four-way intersection near West Davenport.
