= Middle Brook (New York) =

- Location of the mouth of Middle Brook

Location
- Country: United States
- State: New York
- County: Delaware

Physical characteristics
- Source
  - coordinates: 42°29′23″N 74°35′53″W
- Mouth: Charlotte Creek
  - coordinates: 42°29′08″N 74°49′25″W
  - elevation: 1,260 ft (380 m)

Basin features
- Tributaries
  - left: Center Brook
  - right: Tedle Brook

Middle Brook is a river in Delaware County, New York and Schoharie County, New York. It flows into Charlotte Creek northeast of Davenport.
