= West Davenport, New York =

- Hamlet
- Location within New York Location within the United States
- Coordinates: 42°26′45″N 74°57′48″W
- Country: United States
- State: New York
- County: Delaware
- Town: Davenport
- Elevation: 1,181 ft (360 m)
- Time zone: UTC-5 (Eastern (EST))
  - Summer (DST): UTC-4 (EDT)
- ZIP code: 13860
- Area code: 607
- GNIS feature ID: 969203

West Davenport is a hamlet in Delaware County, New York, United States. The community is located along Charlotte Creek, 5.2 miles (8.4 km) east of Oneonta. West Davenport has a post office with ZIP code 13860, which opened on January 25, 1839.
