= Negro Brook =

- Location of the mouth of Negro Brook

Location
- Country: United States
- State: New York
- County: Delaware

Physical characteristics
- Source
  - coordinates: 42°31′00″N 74°50′11″W
- Mouth: Charlotte Creek
  - coordinates: 42°28′42″N 74°50′36″W
  - elevation: 1,250 ft (380 m)

Negro Brook is a river in Delaware County, New York and Otsego County, New York. It flows into Charlotte Creek north of Davenport.
