= National Railway Historical Society =

Non-profit organization established in 1935

The National Railway Historical Society (NRHS) is a non-profit organization established in 1935 in the United States to promote interest in, and appreciation for the historical development of railroads. It is headquartered in the Philadelphia, Pennsylvania area and organized into 16 regions and 170 local chapters located in the United States, Canada, and the United Kingdom. The NRHS sponsors the popular RailCamp summer orientation program in partnership with Amtrak and the National Park Service, offering high school youth hands-on experience in the railroad industry.

== National organization ==
=== History ===
The NRHS was formed in Baltimore, Maryland, on August 18, 1935, when railfans from Lancaster, Pennsylvania, Philadelphia, Trenton, New Jersey, and New York City gathered there for a farewell excursion on the then soon-to-be-abandoned Washington, Baltimore and Annapolis Electric Railway. Officers from railfan clubs in those cities decided to merge and form a national organization, which they dubbed the "National Railway Historical Society".

Leon Franks of the Lancaster club was elected the first chairman of the NRHS and William P. Hamilton III of Trenton was the first NRHS president.

=== Currently ===
The NRHS has around 10,000 members as of October 2015 and is one of the largest rail historical societies in the U.S. The NRHS is a non-profit section 501(c)(3) organization. Tony White is currently national president. Its mailing address is: National Railway Historical Society, Inc., 505 South Lenola Road, Suite 226, Moorestown, N.J. 08057. The NRHS is "a historical preservation charity", with its future focus on education and preservation.

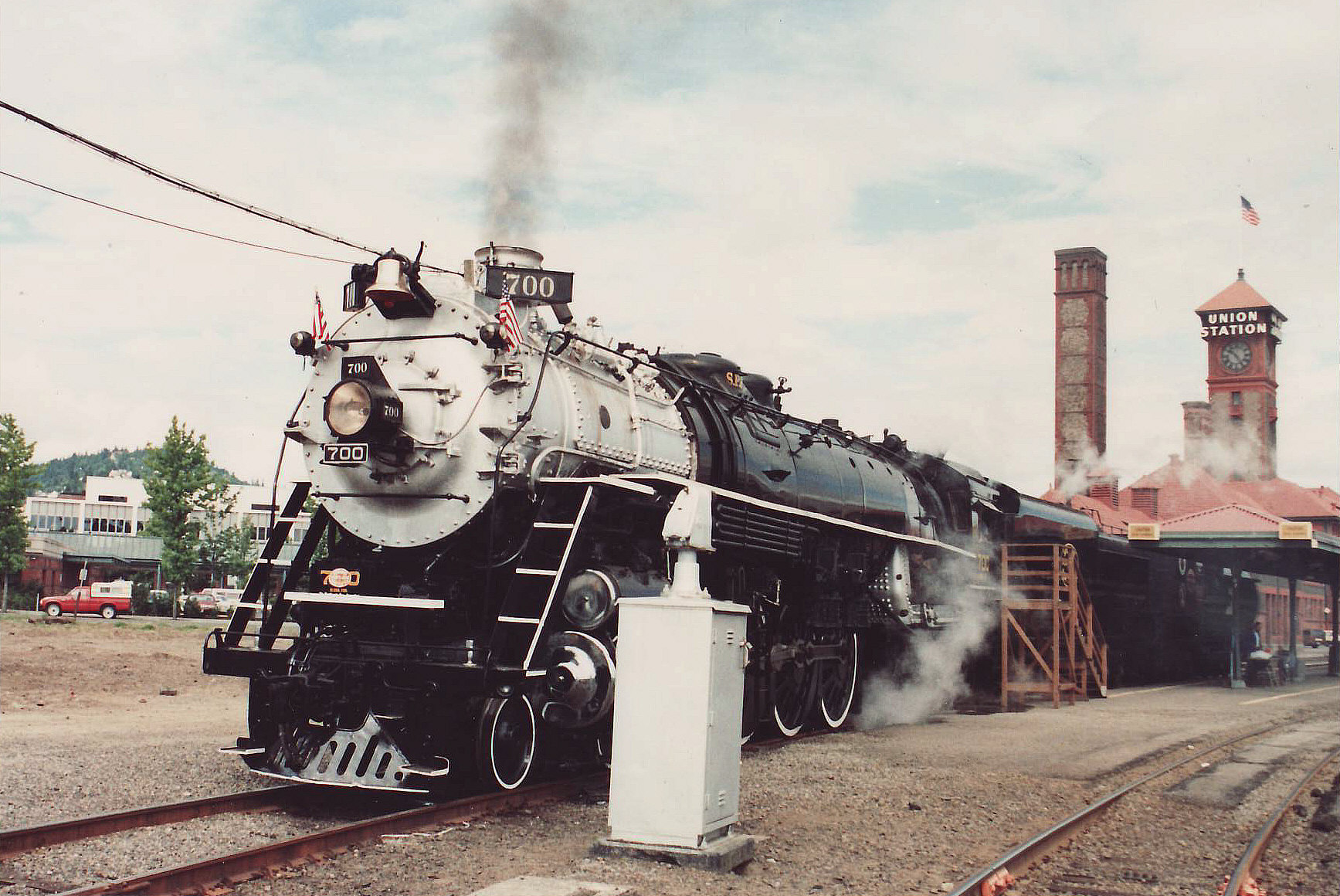
SP&S #700 (pictured in 1991 at Portland, Oregon), pulled an excursion train for the 2005 NRHS national convention there.

The Society holds an annual national convention, featuring exhibits and excursions using historic railroad locomotives and rolling stock. It publishes the National Railway Bulletin, a bimonthly membership newsletter containing articles, photos, and news about railroads, both past and present, as well as coverage of local chapter activities.

The organization began a "Railway Heritage Grants Program" in 1991, to provide financial grants to "organizations that educate, publish, and preserve railroad history to benefit future generations", according to an NRHS news release. As described by the NRHS, projects assisted by the Railway Heritage Grants Program "range from refurbishing historic railroad stations and restoring vintage steam locomotives for operating and museum display, to the cataloging and storage of historic railroad archives".

=== "RailCamp" program ===
The NRHS conducts two week-long "Railcamps" each summer for high school-age youth. The program offers firsthand experience of rail history and operations, offered in partnership with the National Park Service and Amtrak and other organizations and companies in the rail industry. In 2008, participants toured Steamtown's roundhouse and shops, operating some of the shop machinery. The youth also visited Amtrak's massive Wilmington, Delaware, maintenance facility, where they went inside locomotives and met with Amtrak employees to learn about railroad careers. One participant wrote afterwards in Trains magazine that, "The experience truly increased my respect for the men and women who ... care for these huge machines."

== Local chapters ==
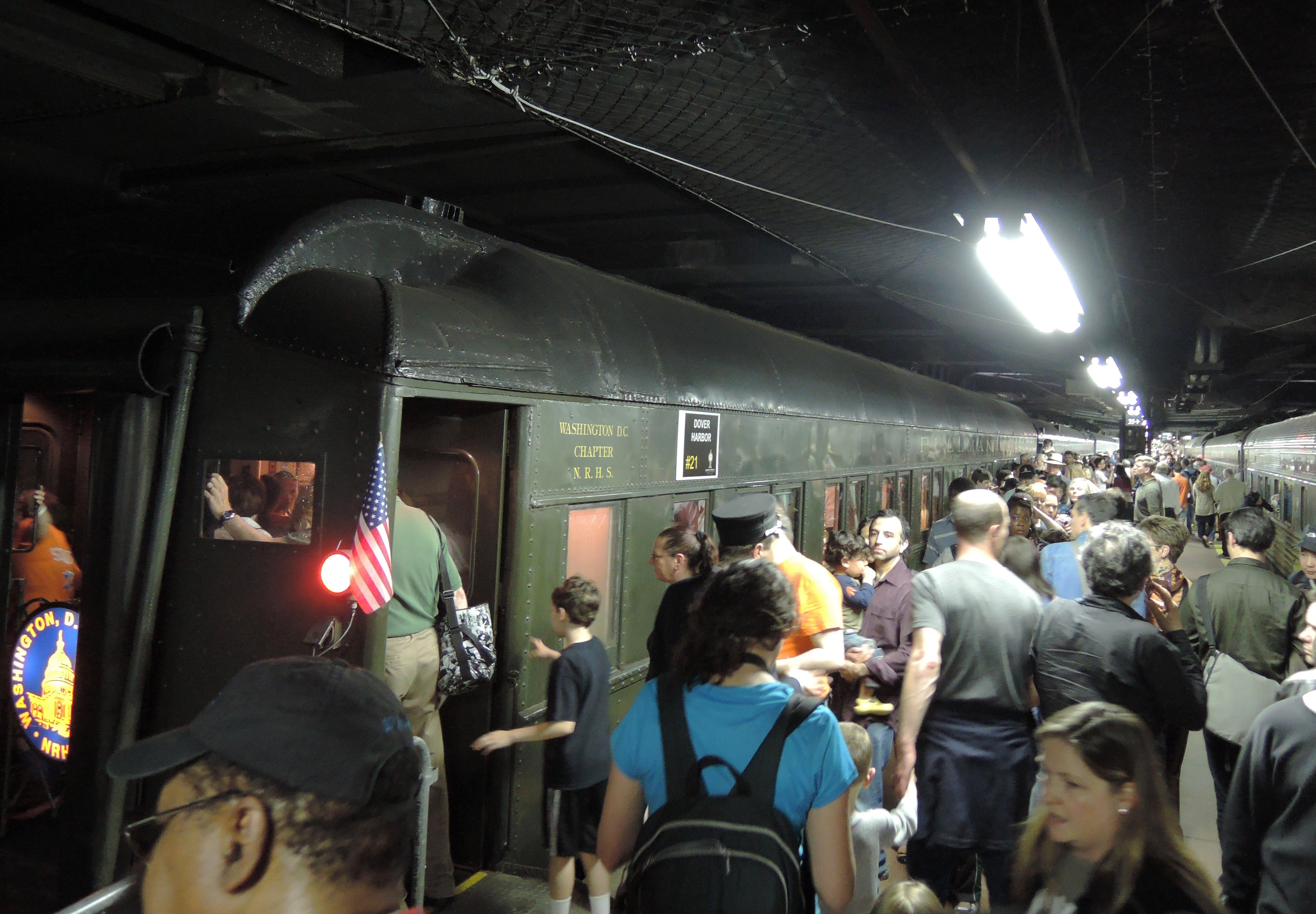
The Dover Harbor of Washington DC chapter, on display in New York

Typically, local NRHS chapters concentrate on railroad history in their specific geographic area. For example, Mid-Atlantic Region chapters are particularly interested in such lines as the Baltimore and Ohio Railroad, the Pennsylvania Railroad, the Western Maryland Railway, and the Maryland and Pennsylvania Railroad, all of which once operated in the region.

In addition to the study and preservation of railroad artifacts, NRHS chapter activities may include periodic excursions using historic railroad equipment, such as steam locomotives. Some chapters are involved in restoration of rail equipment and structures . Others operate rail museums or own locomotives, such as the Central New York Chapter's two former Pennsylvania Railroad EMD E8 diesel locomotives. A few chapters even own and operate entire short-line railroads, such as the New Hope Valley Railway.

== See also ==
- Cooperstown and Charlotte Valley Railroad
- Delaware Otsego Corporation
- Hull Street Station
- Rochester Subway
- Henry H. Rogers
- Ulster & Delaware Railroad Historical Society
- Union County Industrial Railroad
- Hawaiian Railway Society
