= Charlotte Creek (New York) =

- Location of the mouth within New York State

Location
- Country: United States
- State: New York
- Region: Delaware County

Physical characteristics
- Source
  - location: Summit, New York
- Mouth: Susquehanna River
  - location: Emmons, New York
  - coordinates: 42°27′14″N 75°01′04″W
- Basin size: 176 sq mi (460 km^{2})

Basin features
- Tributaries
  - left: Clapper Hollow Creek, Middle Brook, Kortright Creek, Prosser Hollow Brook
  - right: Keyser Brook, Negro Brook, Dona Brook, Crawford Brook, Pine Lake

Charlotte Creek is a river located in Delaware County, New York. Charlotte Creek borders the southern border of Otsego County, New York for a few miles near the mouth. The creek converges with the Susquehanna River by Emmons, New York.

== Tributaries ==
Dona Brook flows into Charlotte Creek west of Davenport. Crawford Brook flows into Charlotte Creek northeast of Davenport Center.

== See also ==
- List of rivers of New York
