= Ford Motor Company Edgewater Assembly Plant =

- U.S. National Register of Historic Places
- New Jersey Register of Historic Places
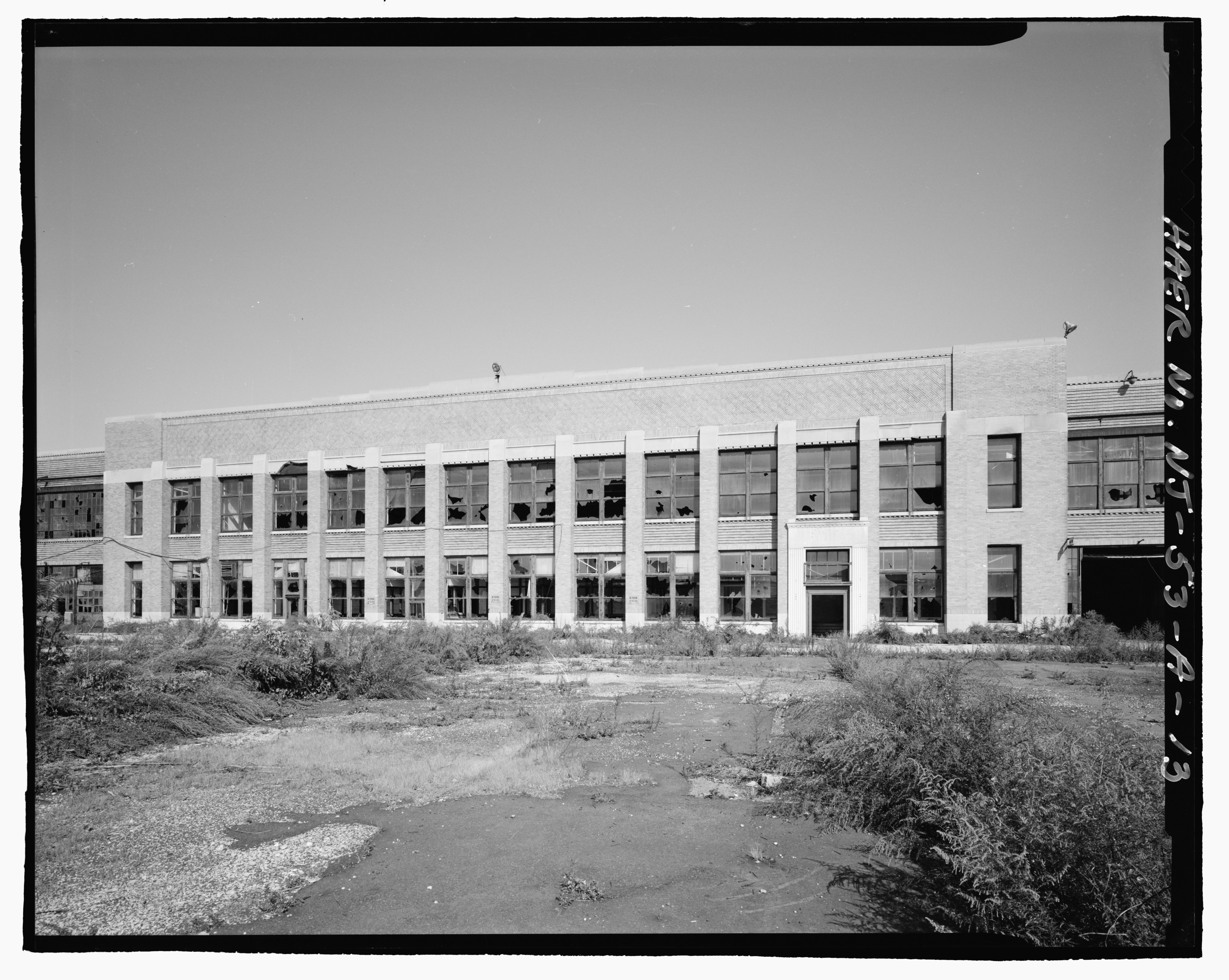

- Location within Bergen County, New Jersey Location within New Jersey Location within the United States
- Location: 309 River Road, Edgewater, New Jersey
- Coordinates: 40°48′33″N 73°59′9″W
- Area: 37.2 acres (15.1 ha)
- Built: 1929
- Architect: Albert Kahn
- Architectural style: Late 19th and Early 20th Century American Movements, Modern Movement
- NRHP reference No.: 83001507
- NJRHP No.: 465

Significant dates
- Added to NRHP: September 15, 1983
- Designated NJRHP: June 30, 1983

The Ford Motor Company Edgewater Assembly Plant was a Ford assembly plant built in 1930. It was located in Edgewater, Bergen County, New Jersey, United States. The factory produced its last vehicle on 15 July 1955. The plant, located at 309 River Road, was added to the National Register of Historic Places on September 15, 1983. The building was torn down in 2006 and replaced with a residential development.

It was replaced by Ford's Mahwah Assembly plant. Ford explained in that: "The Edgewater plant had been built for the assembly of pre-war cars. The Ford has become a much bigger and different car since then and the physical limitations of the Edgewater plant site prevented plant expansion.

== See also ==
- Alcoa Edgewater Works
- Edgewater Tunnel
- National Register of Historic Places listings in Bergen County, New Jersey
- List of Ford factories
