= Hudson Project =

Location
- Country: United States
- State: New York; New Jersey
- From: Ridgefield, New Jersey
- Passes through: Edgewater, New Jersey; Hudson River
- To: Manhattan, New York City

Construction information
- Substation manufacturer: Siemens
- Commissioned: 2013

Technical information
- Capacity: 660 MW
- AC voltage: 230/345 kV
- DC voltage: 180 kV

The Hudson Project is a 345 kV AC underground and submarine power cable system which supplies electric power to New York City from the Bergen Generating Station, in Ridgefield, New Jersey. The cable system was laid by Anbaric Development Partners.

== Overview ==
The system consists of a high-voltage direct current (HVDC) back-to-back station with a transmission rate of 660 MW and DC voltage of 180 kV at 1 Railroad Avenue (40°49′56″N 74°00′44″W) in Ridgefield, which is connected by a 230 kV line with the nearby substation. From the static inverter plant the three-phase AC line to Consolidated Edison's W. 49th Street substation at 40°45′57″N 73°59′45″W starts, is in its whole length implemented as underground or submarine cable, buried 10 feet (3.0 m) in non-navigable and 15 feet (4.6 m) in navigable sections.

After travelling through the Edgewater Tunnel, the cable enters the Hudson River at Edgewater, New Jersey and runs along the eastern side of the river parallel to the shore until piers 92 and 94, where it enters Manhattan.

Construction of the link started in May 2011 and was completed in June 2013.

The cable was completely removed and replaced in 2017. The Ariadne, a 130-meter cable ship, performed the submarine cable replacement.

== See also ==
- Neptune Cable (submarine power cable between New Jersey and Long Island, NY)
