= Bergen Generating Station =

Gas-fired power plant in New Jersey

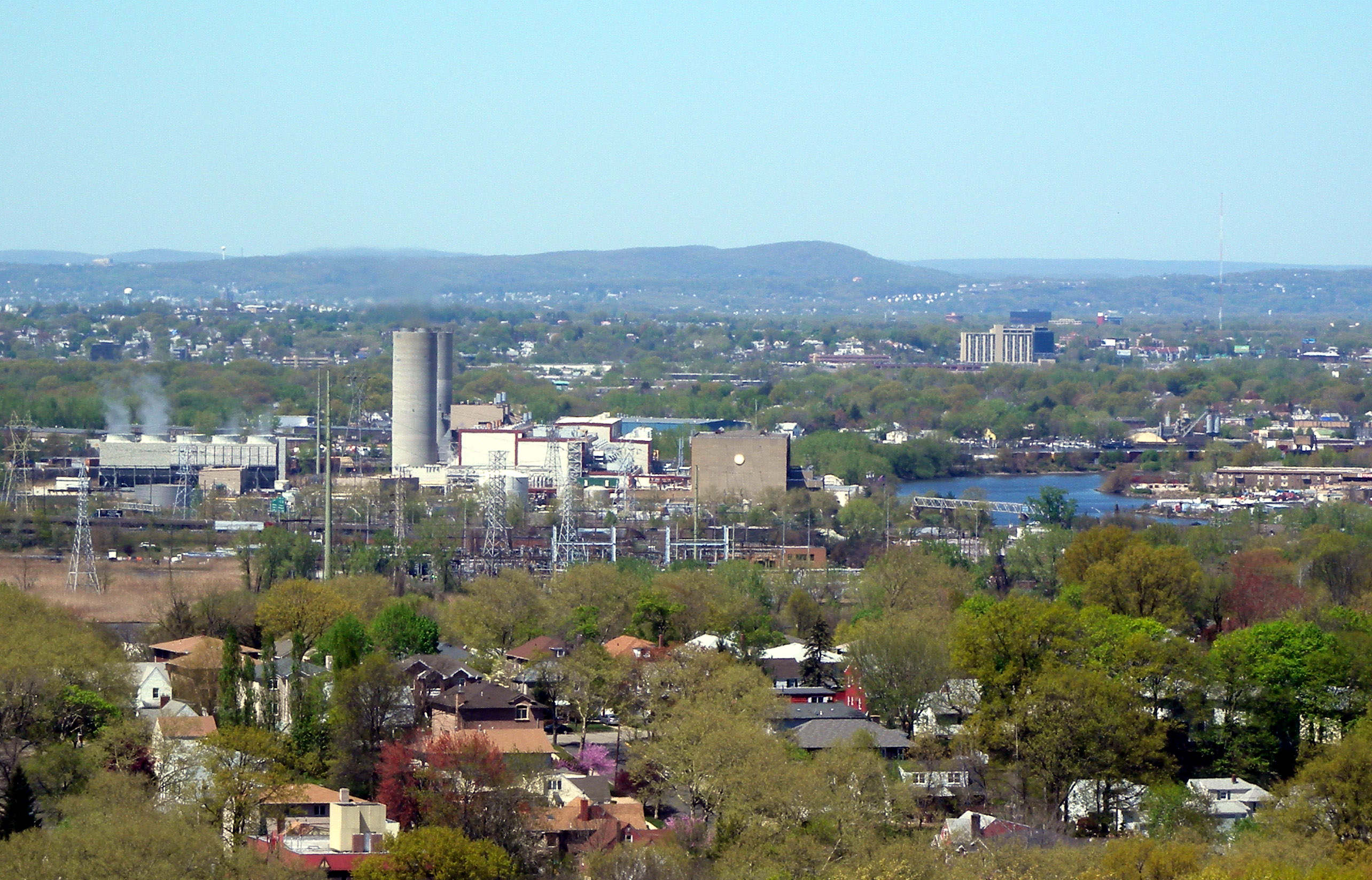
- Country: United States
- Location: Ridgefield, New Jersey
- Coordinates: 40°50′22″N 74°01′28″W
- Status: Operational
- Commission date: 1960
- Owner: Parkway Generation, LLC

Thermal power station
- Primary fuel: Pipeline natural gas
- Secondary fuel: Diesel oil
- Turbine technology: CCCT
- Cooling source: BCUA Treated Effluent

Power generation
- Nameplate capacity: 1229 MW

Bergen Generating Station is a natural gas-fired power plant located in Ridgefield, New Jersey. The plant is owned and operated by Parkway Generation, LLC, a wholly owned subsidiary of ArcLight Energy Partners Fund VII, L.P. It is adjacent to the Little Ferry railyard, within the New Jersey Meadowlands, on the banks of Overpeck Creek, near its confluence with the Hackensack River.

The plant supplies electricity to New Jersey and, via the Hudson Project submarine power cable, to New York City.

Originally fueled by coal it was converted to heavy fuel and gas in 1970.

The power plant uses a closed loop cooling system, which eliminates the need to withdraw water from the Hackensack River for cooling. The cooling tower make-up water for the power plant uses treated wastewater from the nearby Bergen County Utilities Authority sewage treatment plant in Little Ferry, thereby eliminating the need to use potable water for cooling.

A 12-hour 50 MW / 600 MWh grid battery is planned for the site.

== See also ==
- List of power stations in New Jersey
