= Davenport Center, New York =

- Census-designated place
- Location within New York
- Coordinates: 42°26′53″N 74°55′8″W
- Country: United States
- State: New York
- County: Delaware County
- Town: Davenport

Area
  - Total: 3.14 sq mi (8.14 km^{2})
  - Land: 3.10 sq mi (8.04 km^{2})
  - Water: 0.039 sq mi (0.10 km^{2})
- Elevation: 1,221 ft (372 m)

Population (2020)
  - Total: 344
  - Density: 111/sq mi (42.8/km^{2})
- Time zone: UTC-5 (Eastern (EST))
  - Summer (DST): UTC-4 (EDT)
- ZIP Codes: 13751 (Davenport Center); 13750 (Davenport); 13757 (East Meredith); 13820 (Oneonta)
- Area code: 845
- FIPS code: 36-19774
- GNIS feature ID: 948049
- Website: Town of Davenport

Davenport Center is a hamlet and census-designated place (CDP) in the town of Davenport, Delaware County, New York, United States. As of the 2020 census, Davenport Center had a population of 344.

== Geography ==
Davenport Center is located, as the name suggests, in the center of the town of Davenport, in the Charlotte Valley. Charlotte Creek flows along the northern edge of the community on its way west to the Susquehanna River at Oneonta. New York State Route 23 passes through Davenport Center, leading west 8 miles (13 km) to Oneonta and east 18 miles (29 km) to Stamford.

According to the United States Census Bureau, the Davenport Center CDP has a total area of 3.1 square miles (8.1 km^{2}), of which 3.1 square miles (8.0 km^{2}) is land and 0.04 square miles (0.1 km^{2}), or 1.28%, is water.

== Demographics ==
Historical population
Census	Pop.	Note	%±
2020	344		—
U.S. Decennial Census
