= Delaware Otsego Corporation =

American railway holding company

Overview
- Headquarters: Cooperstown, New York, U.S.
- Reporting mark: Current- NYSW, CNYK Former- CACV, FJG, LASB, RVRR, SIRY, TPW Never materialized- KTER
- Locale: Upstate New York; Northeastern Pennsylvania; New Jersey, U.S.
- Dates of operation: 1965–Present

Technical
- Track gauge: 4 ft 8 1/2 in (1,435 mm) standard gauge

Other
- Website: www.nysw.com

The Delaware Otsego Corporation (DO) is an American railroad holding company that is headquartered in Cooperstown, New York. The company was established in 1965 as the Delaware Otsego Railroad by Walter G. Rich, and they began to specialize in reactivating abandoned branch lines as profitable short line railroads throughout New York and New Jersey. They were collectively known as the DO System.

Their largest subsidiary is the New York, Susquehanna and Western Railway (NYS&W), and reorganizing them expanded DO's status from a short line company to a regional railroad network. Since 1997, DO has been owned by DO Acquisition LLC. As of 2024, the NYS&W and the Central New York Railroad are DO's only remaining subsidiaries.

== History ==
The Delaware Otsego Corporation (DO) was established in 1965 as the Delaware Otsego Railroad by a group of businessmen and railfans, led by Syracuse University law school student Walter G. Rich. DO was formed, in response to the New York Central Railroad's (NYC) abandonment of their Ulster and Delaware Branch. The NYC cut back operations to Bloomville, and DO subsequently acquired a 2.6-mile (4.2 km) section of the branch between Oneonta and Mickle Bridge. Delaware Otsego was named as such, since the section lay on the border between the New York counties of Delaware and Otsego.

The company acquired former United States Army 0-6-0 steam locomotive No. 2 from the Virginia Blue Ridge Railway, and they began using it for their tourist excursion operations. Their tourist trains operated on the branch between the passenger station near their interchange with Delaware and Hudson Railway (D&H), and Mickle Bridge. Occasional freight service was also provided. In 1970, the state of New York condemned the right-of-way, in favor of construction of Interstate 88 through Oneonta. With settlement money, Walter Rich and his fellow Delaware Otsego executives searched for another branch to acquire and operate.

In 1971, the D&H decided to abandon their Cooperstown Branch, which lies for 16 miles (26 km) between Cooperstown Junction near Colliersville and Cooperstown. Following some successful negotiations, Delaware Otsego purchased the Cooperstown Branch from the D&H and revived the route's original name, the Cooperstown and Charlotte Valley Railroad (CACV), and they relocated their tourist operations there. The Delaware Otsego Railroad was quickly renamed as the Delaware Otsego Corporation to reflect their new status as a holding company. Concurrently, they acquired their first diesel locomotive, ALCO RS-2 No. 100, to supplement 0-6-0 No. 2. DO also established their new headquarters at the two-story Cooperstown depot.

In 1975, DO discontinued their steam operations, and No. 2 was left in indoor storage in Milford. Throughout the 1970s and 1980s, DO acquired and established additional short line companies for freight operations, including the Fonda, Johnstown and Gloversville Railroad (FJ&G), the Lackawaxen and Stourbridge Railroad, the Staten Island Railway, and the Rahway Valley Railroad. In 1980, Delaware Otsego established the Kingston Terminal Railroad (KTER) to operate a 2-mile (3.2 km) section of the former NYC Catskill Mountain Branch between Kingston and Rondout, New York. Before operations were planned to commence, the branch's sole customer, a cement plant, shut down, and the KTER was quickly dissolved. That same year, DO purchased their largest subsidiary, the New Jersey-based New York, Susquehanna and Western Railway (NYS&W), and they reconditioned their trackage and expanded their operations into New York state, resulting in DO becoming classified as a regional system.

On October 3, 1997, DO Acquisition LLC announced that it had completed the short-form merger of Delaware Otsego with a wholly owned subsidiary via a stock tender offer of $22 per share. The merger brought the Delaware Otsego Corporation and their subsidiaries under control of Norfolk Southern (NS) and CSX, with CSX and NS each obtaining 10% of DO's shares, while Walter Rich obtained 80%. On August 9, 2007, Rich died at the age of 61, following an eight-month struggle against pancreatic cancer. Shortly thereafter, the NYS&W reduced their operations, with lucrative traffic being siphoned-off to CSX and NS, and all commercial passenger operations were discontinued. As of 2025, the NYS&W railway continues to operate freight trains between Syracuse, New York and North Bergen, New Jersey. The railway also hosts occasional detour of trains, when derailments or overflowing traffic block the CSX's River Subdivision.

== Current Railroads ==
=== New York, Susquehanna and Western Railway ===
In 1979, the state of New Jersey asked DO to take over operations of the then-bankrupt New York, Susquehanna and Western Railroad (NYS&W). By that time, the NYS&W had operated at a financial loss with deteriorating trackage and locomotives, under the ownership of real-estate developer Irving Maidman, and the state was looking to have the company operate under new ownership, to avoid job losses. In 1980, DO purchased the NYS&W for $5 million, and they reorganized it as the New York, Susquehanna and Western Railway and initiated a rehabilitation process for their trackage. In 1982, Conrail petitioned to abandon their former Erie Lackawanna branches from Binghamton to Jamesville and Utica, and portions of the former Lehigh and Hudson River Railway (L&HR) Warwick, New York, and Limecrest, New Jersey.

DO acquired the EL lines and organized them as the Northern Division of the NYS&W, while the L&HR lines and the remaining original NYS&W trackage were organized as their Southern Division. In 1986, the western end of the NYS&W between Butler and Sparta Junction, which had been shut down since the early 1970s, was rehabilitated. A trackage rights agreement was arranged with Conrail, where the NYS&W would operate over Conrail's L&HR line between Warwick and Campbell Hall, and on the Southern Tier Line between Campbell Hall and Binghamton. From 1985 to 2001, the NYS&W operated intermodal trains via a partnership with SeaLand, the Delaware and Hudson, and CSX, and they served as an alternative to Conrail's services out of New York, until Conrail was split between CSX and Norfolk Southern, in 1999. As their only remaining railroad subsidiary, the NYS&W and their operations serve as DO's primary source of income.

=== Central New York Railroad ===
In 1972, DO purchased the Erie Lackawanna's 22-mile (35 km) long Richfield Springs Branch, and they reactivated it as the Central New York Railroad (CNYK). State funds were made available to rehabilitate the line in 1974, and regular freight service was commenced. The CNYK interchanged with the EL's Binghamton-Utica branch, which was subsequently obtained by Conrail. In 1982, when DO purchased the Utica branch from Conrail, the CNYK became a part of the NYS&W's Northern Division. In 1988, service on the CNYK was shut down from declining freight traffic, and the line was formally abandoned in 1995. In early 2005, the CNYK was reactivated as a paper corporation by the NYS&W, and it was assigned to operate the Port Jervis-Binghamton section of the Southern Tier Line, which the NYS&W leased from Norfolk Southern.

== Former Railroads ==
=== Cooperstown and Charlotte Valley Railroad ===
In 1971, Delaware Otsego purchased the Delaware and Hudson's Cooperstown branch, which led from 16 miles (26 km) Cooperstown Junction near Colliersville to Cooperstown, New York. DO revived the branch's original name, the Cooperstown and Charlotte Valley Railroad (CACV), and they commenced tourist and freight operations on the line. DO's 0-6-0 steam locomotive No. 2 was transferred to Cooperstown, and they purchased an ALCO RS-2 from the D&H. The C&CV provided steam tourist operations until 1975, when low ridership was deemed unjustifiable for the operating costs.

The railroad operated freight trains for local freight customers, until December 1987, and the trackage was subsequently embargoed. It was used for freight car storage until 1996, when it was sold to the Leatherstocking Chapter of the National Railway Historical Society (NRHS). The chapter rebuilt portions of the line and began to revive seasonal tourist operations. As of 2022, rehabilitation is in progress to reopen the entire line between Cooperstown Junction and Cooperstown, with new service planned to continue south of Milford to their connection with Norfolk Southern.

=== Fonda, Johnstown and Gloversville Railroad ===
In 1974, DO purchased the Fonda, Johnstown and Gloversville Railroad (FJ&G), and they managed to regain the railroad's profitability. Following the Early 1980s recession, the FJ&G lost their final remaining major customers, and in 1984, the railroad was shut down from financial losses. In 1988, a final run with a Trackmobile was made to clear the line of any remaining railroad equipment. Most of the FJ&G route was later ripped up and converted into a rail trail.

=== Lackawaxen and Stourbridge Railroad ===
In 1975, the Erie Lackawanna Railway requested to be absorbed into Conrail, but some of their routes, including the Honesdale Branch, were rejected from inclusion. Officials from Wayne County campaigned to save the line to protect the customers it served, and they searched for an operator to take over the branch. In March 1976, the DO was approached with the possibility of operating the line, and they expressed interest. The Lackawaxen and Stourbridge Railroad (LASB) was formed to operate the branch, and a special order was handed down from the Interstate Commerce Commission (ICC) to operate the line until a purchase agreement could be worked out.

The first LASB train was operated on April 1, 1976. The railroad enjoyed various forms of success operating passenger excursions and regular freight trains. In June 1989, DO ended their LASB operations, and the newly formed Stourbridge Railroad (SBRR) took over. A flood in 2005 severed the line, and a failed attempt by Morristown and Erie Railroad to operate the line resulted in the abandonment of all operations in 2012. Ten years later, in 2022, the entire railroad operates passenger trains under new ownership, as The Stourbridge Line.

=== Staten Island Railway ===
The earliest portions of the Staten Island Railway were built in 1860, connecting the ferry landing at Tompkinsville with the village of Tottenville, New York. Looking to expand into the New York City area, the Baltimore and Ohio Railroad purchased the line in 1885. The B&O financed the construction of new ferry terminals and slips at St. George, as well as a branch along the north shore of the island to connect to New Jersey via a bridge over the Arthur Kill. Known as the Staten Island Rapid Transit, the line provided freight and passenger service to the island, and the passenger service was electrified in 1925. In 1971, the rapid transit passenger operations were turned over to the Staten Island Rapid Transit Operating Authority: a division of New York's Metropolitan Transportation Authority.

The B&O and their successor, the Chessie System, continued to operate freight service on the island until April 1985, when the SIRT was sold to Delaware Otsego. Operated as the Staten Island Railway (SIRY), mostly with spare equipment and crews from the Susquehanna, DO explored was of attracting additional customers to boost the SIRY's profitability. Under DO ownership, the SIRY utilized an Ex-Chesapeake and Ohio EMD SW9 and an Ex-New York, Ontario and Western EMD NW2. By 1991, many of the SIRY's remaining customers closed their line-side locations, resulting in the SIRY operating at a financial loss. The railway operated their final freight train on April 21, 1992. The SIRY filed for abandonment, and the Arthur Kill Vertical Lift Bridge was locked in its raised position. Their lines in Staten Island were subsequently transferred to the New York City Economic Development Corp. and the Port Authority of New York and New Jersey, which subsequently restored the bridge and developed ExpressRail to service the Howland Hook Marine Terminal.

=== Rahway Valley Railroad ===
The Rahway Valley Railroad (RV), which had gained freight-shipping profits after World War II, operated at a financial loss, following the formation of Conrail in 1976, and an increasing number of their freight customers switched to truck-shipping. Delaware Otsego acquired the Rahway Valley in April 1986, after they lost their affordability to obtain liability insurance. Freight traffic had significantly declined by that time, and service was commonly provided by Staten Island Railway crews. The Rahway Valley's primary Conrail interchange was relocated to their former CNJ connection at Cranford, New Jersey. In 1992, DO shut down the RV, after traffic on the line declined to the point only one customer remained. In February 1995, the remaining trackage was sold to the state of New Jersey, for $6.4 million. On May 9, 2002, the Morristown and Erie Railway signed a 10-year operating agreement with the state to acquire and rehabilitate the remaining RVRR and SIRY trackage.

=== Toledo, Peoria and Western Railway ===
In 1995, the NYS&W acquired a 40% interest in the Toledo, Peoria and Western Railway (TP&W) of Illinois, with full control going to DO the following year. The TP&W was previously revived by businessman Gordon Fuller after the original company was absorbed into the Santa Fe Railway, and the new company was profitable, with 55% of their traffic consisting of intermodal trains. The TP&W began serving as a western terminus for the NYS&W's intermodal trains, bypassing the congested traffic of Chicago. In 1999, DO sold the TP&W to RailAmerica.

== Delaware Otsego railroad ownership timeline ==
- Current
  - New York, Susquehanna and Western Railway (1980)
  - Central New York Railroad (1973)
- Former
  - Cooperstown and Charlotte Valley Railroad (1971)
  - Fonda, Johnstown and Gloversville Railroad (1974)
  - Staten Island Railway (1985)
  - Rahway Valley Railroad (1986)
  - Toledo, Peoria and Western Railway (1996)
- Never materialized
  - Kingston Terminal Railroad (1980)
