= East Meredith, New York =

- Hamlet
- Location within New York Location within the United States
- Coordinates: 42°25′17″N 74°53′13″W
- Country: United States
- State: New York
- County: Delaware
- Elevation: 1,401 ft (427 m)
- Time zone: UTC-5 (Eastern (EST))
  - Summer (DST): UTC-4 (EDT)
- ZIP code: 13757
- Area code: 607
- GNIS feature ID: 949171

East Meredith is a hamlet in Delaware County, New York, United States. The community is 9.3 miles (15.0 km) east-southeast of Oneonta. East Meredith has a post office with ZIP code 13757, which opened on June 15, 1869.
