= Staten Island =

Borough and county in New York, US

Staten Island Richmond County, New York
- Borough and county
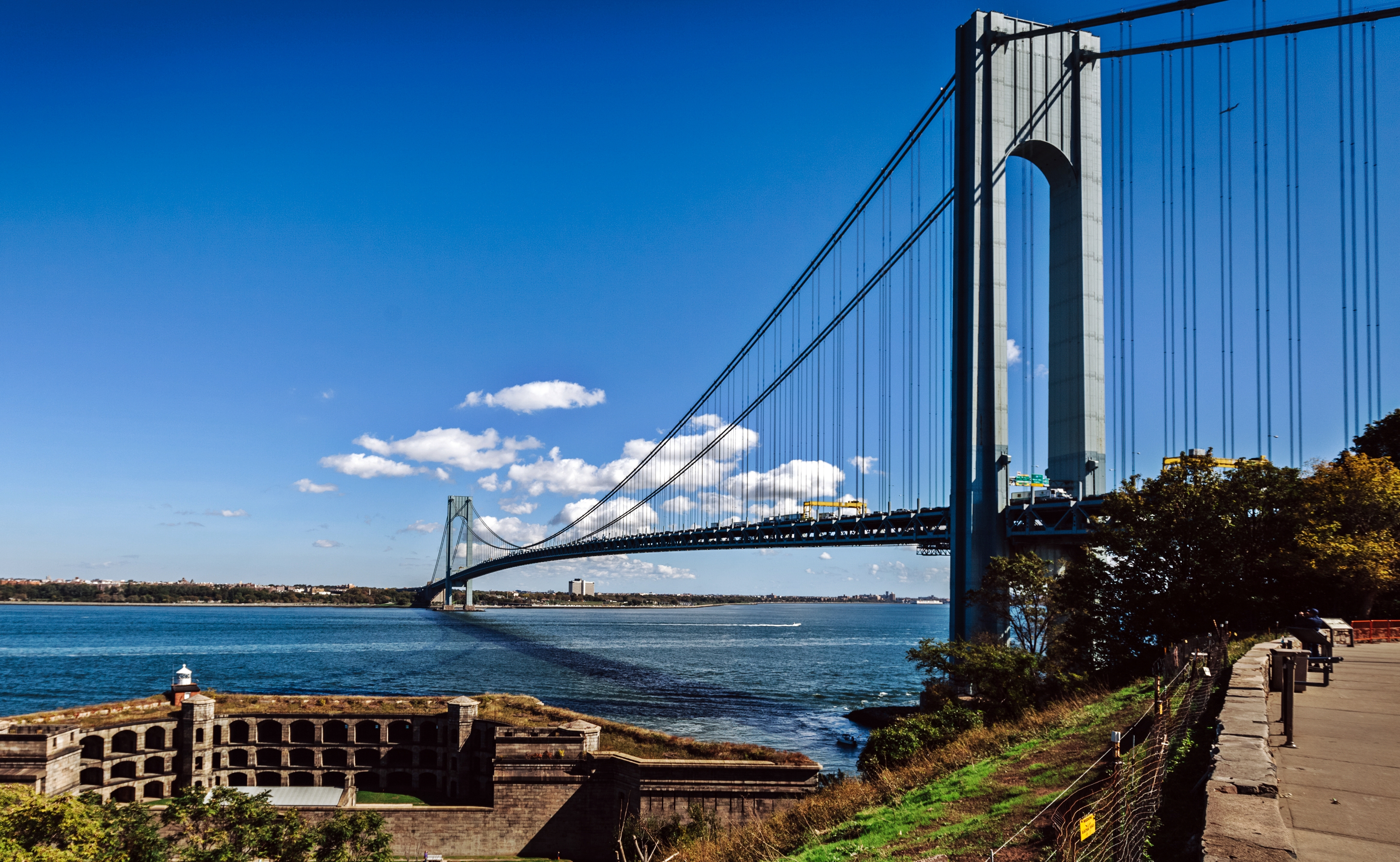
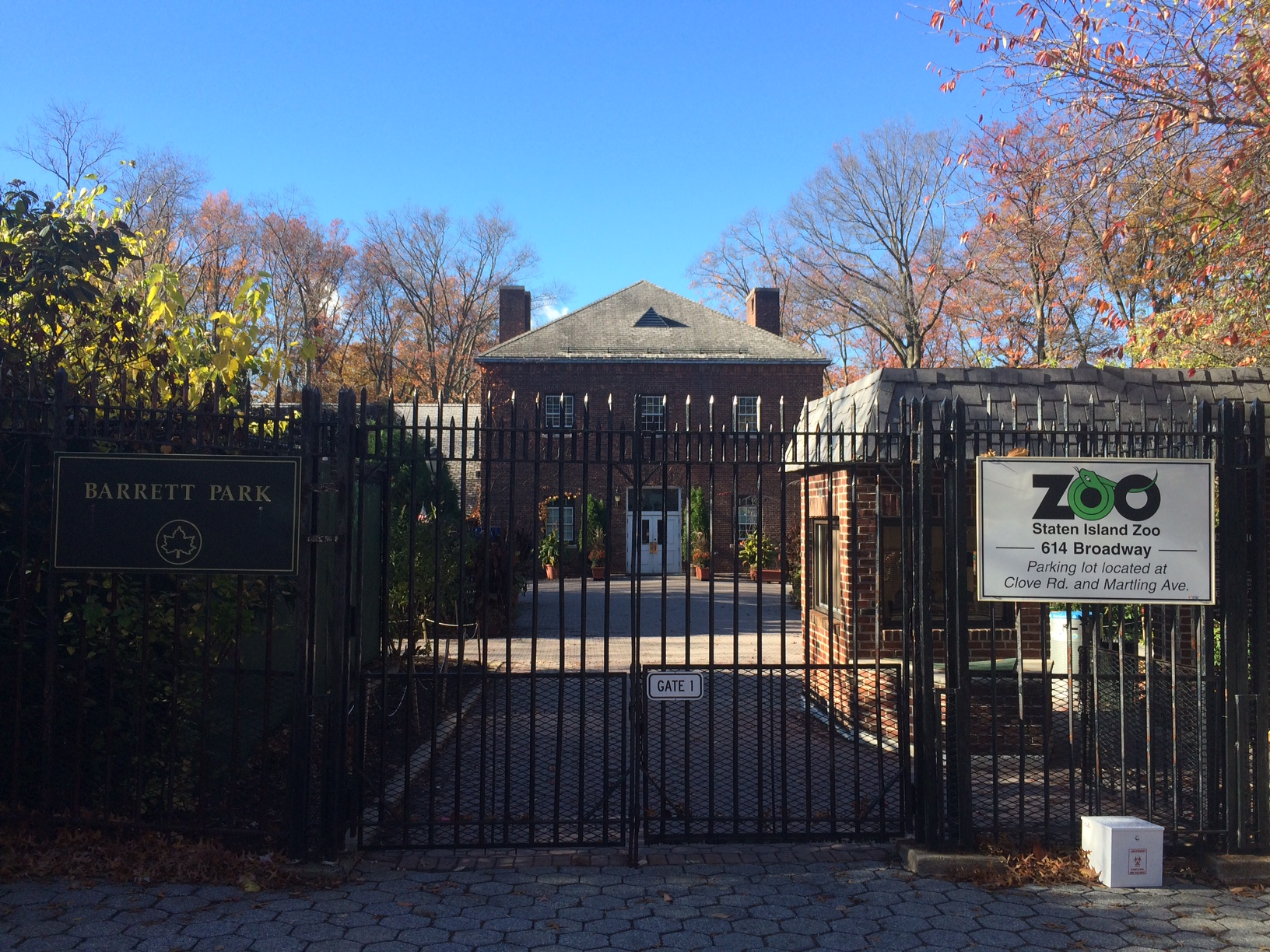
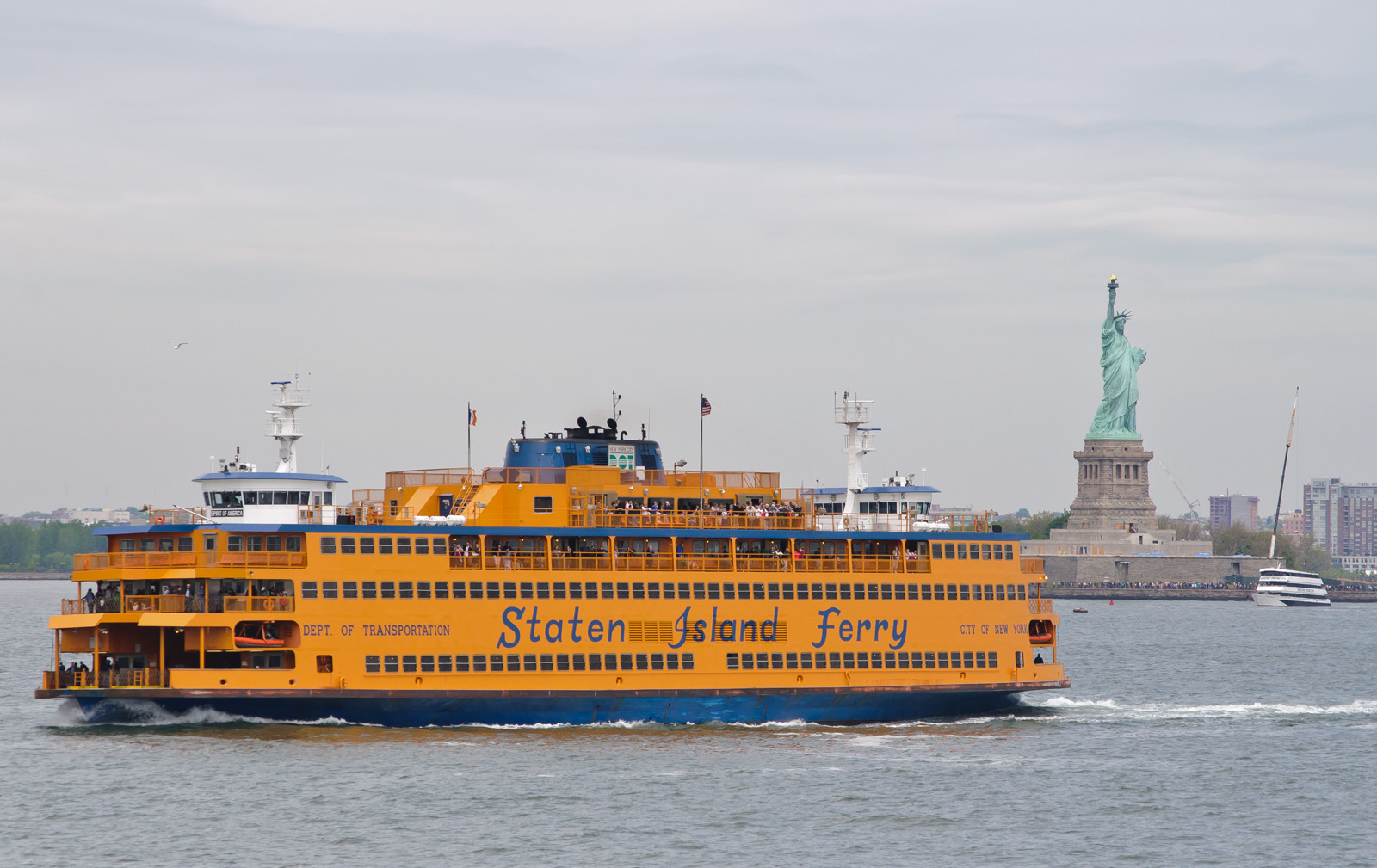
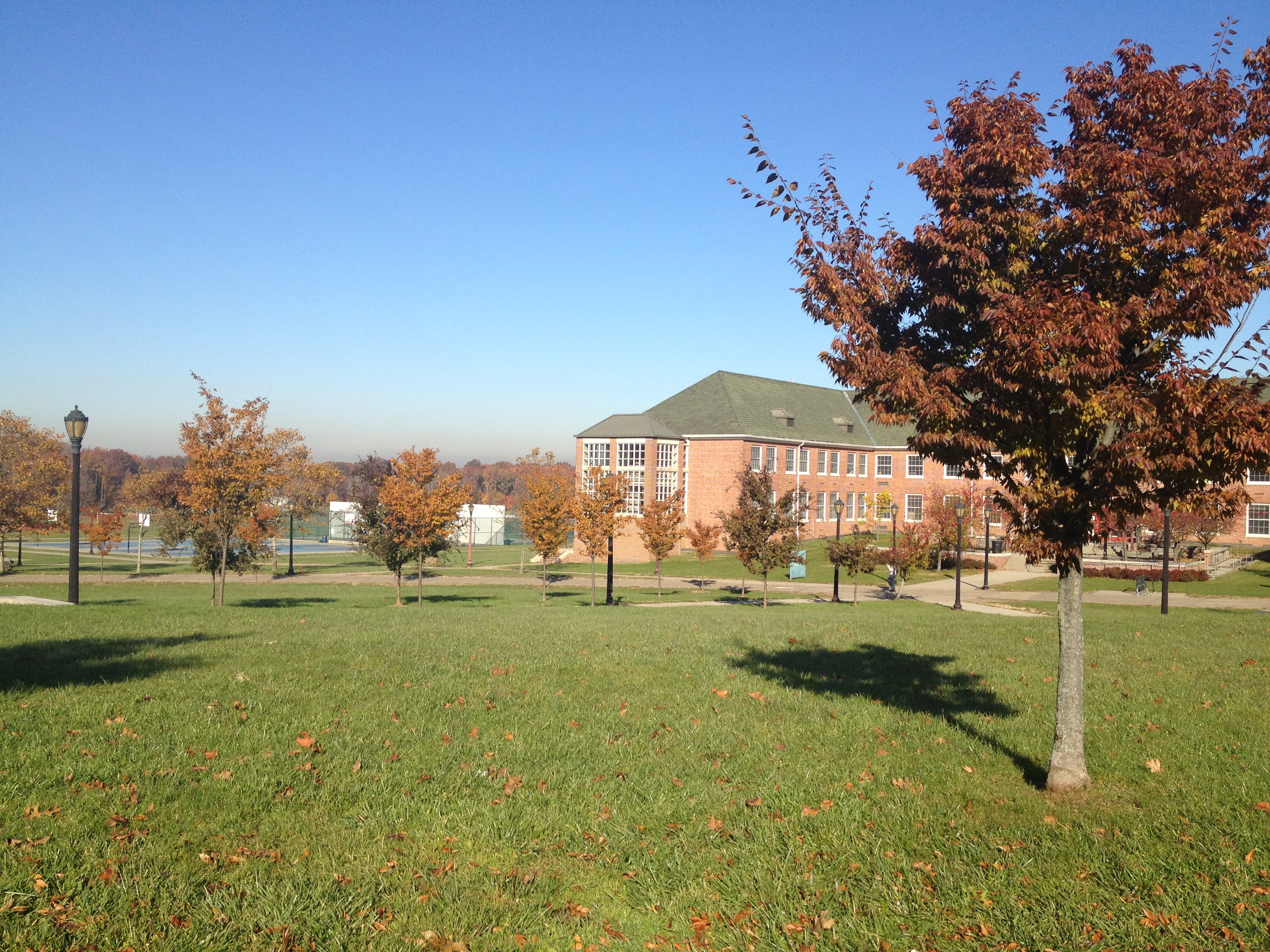
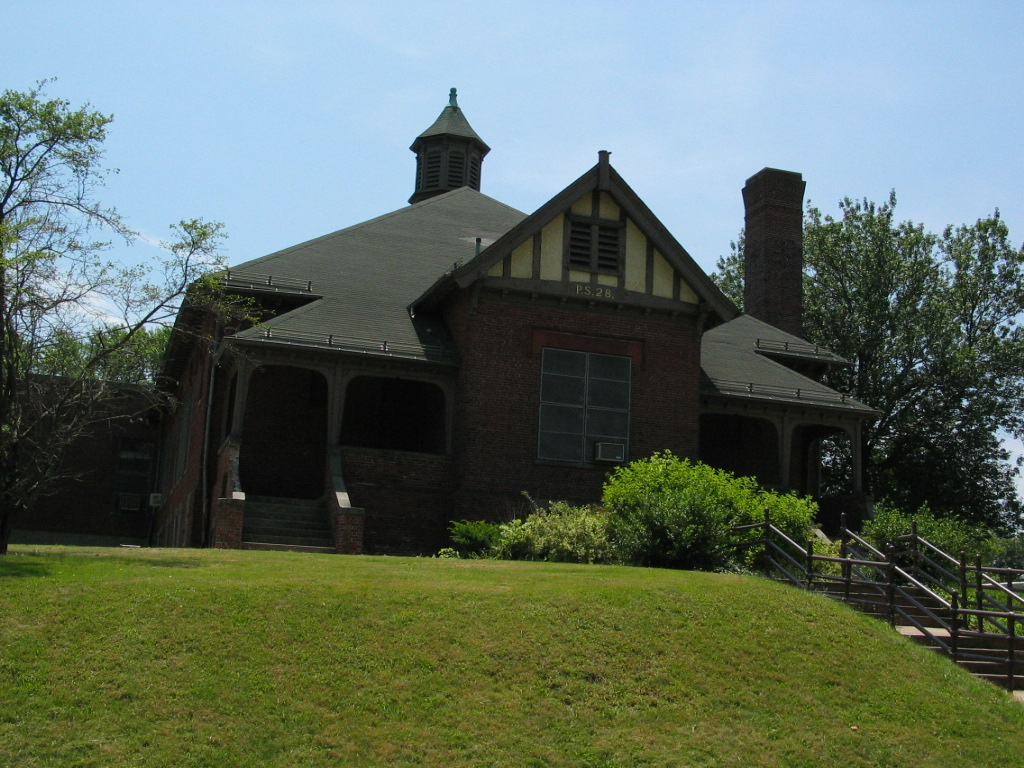
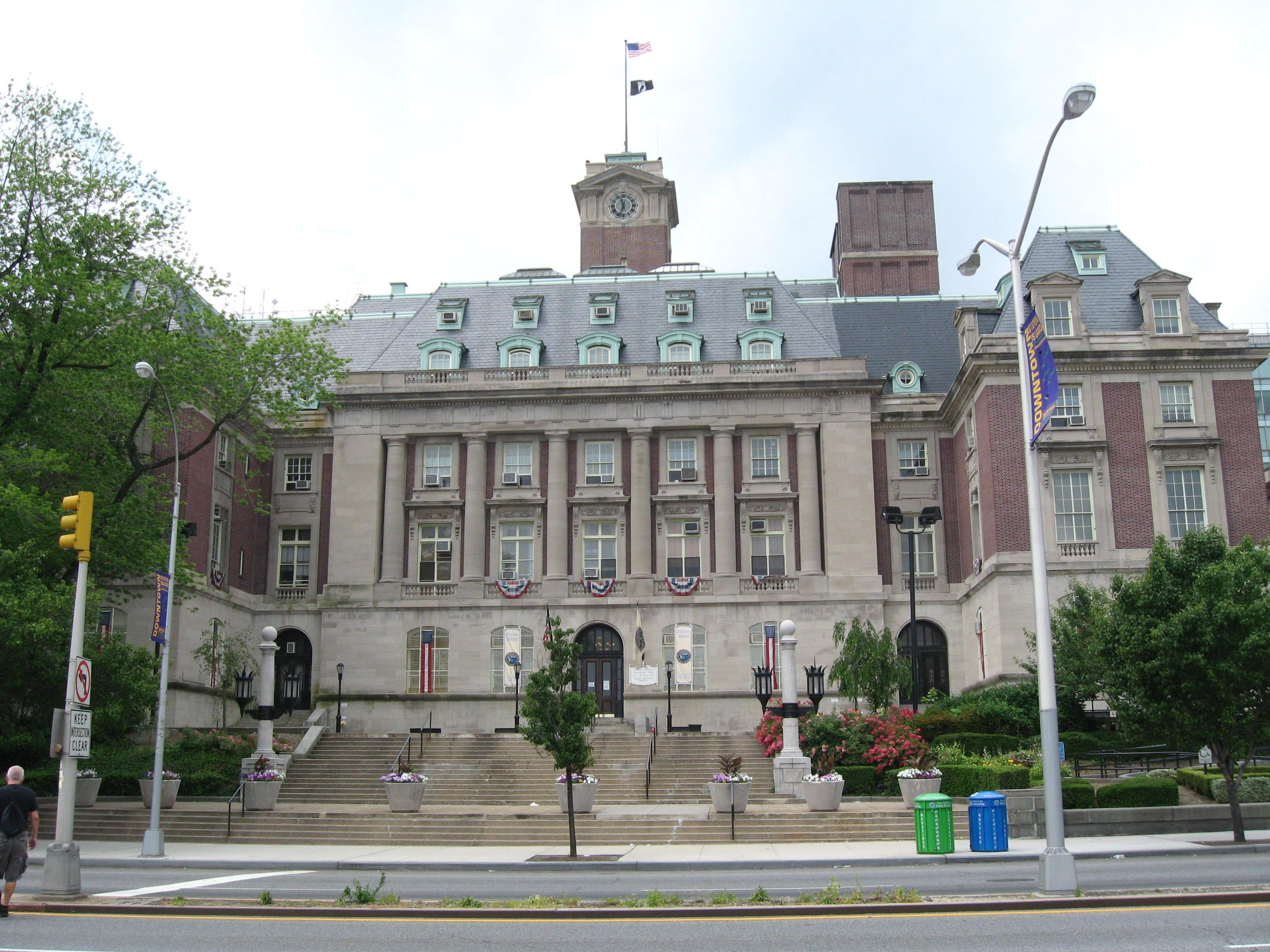
- The Verrazzano–Narrows Bridge Staten Island Zoo Staten Island Ferry College of Staten Island Historic Richmond Town Staten Island Borough Hall

- Flag Seal
- Interactive map outlining Staten Island
- Location within New York City Location within New York state Location within the United States Location in the world
- Coordinates: 40°34′19″N 74°08′49″W
- Country: United States
- State: New York
- County: Richmond (coterminous)
- City: New York City
- Settled: 1661
- Named for: States General of the Netherlands (Staten Island); Charles Lennox, 1st Duke of Richmond (Richmond County)

Government
  - Type: Borough
  - Borough president: Vito Fossella (R) — (Borough of Staten Island)
  - District attorney: Michael McMahon (D) — (Richmond County)

Area
  - Total: 102.5 sq mi (265 km^{2})
  - Land: 58.5 sq mi (152 km^{2})
  - Water: 44 sq mi (110 km^{2}) 43%

Dimensions
  - Length: 13.7 mi (22.0 km)
  - Width: 8.0 mi (12.9 km)
- Highest elevation: 401 ft (122 m)

Population (2020)
  - Total: 495,747
  - Estimate (2026): 503,008 ▲
  - Density: 8,618.3/sq mi (3,327.5/km^{2})
  - Demonym: Staten Islander

GDP
  - Total: US$23.779 billion (2024)
  - Per capita: US$47,598 (2024)
- Time zone: UTC−05:00 (Eastern Standard Time)
  - Summer (DST): UTC−04:00 (Eastern Daylight Time)
- ZIP Code prefix: 103
- Area code: 718/347/929/465, 917
- Website: statenislandusa.com

Staten Island (/ˈstætən/ STAT-ən) is the southernmost of the five boroughs of New York City. It is separated from New Jersey by the Arthur Kill and the Kill Van Kull and from the rest of New York by New York Bay. With a population of 495,747 in the 2020 census, Staten Island is the least populated borough but the third largest in land area at 58.5 sq mi (152 km^{2}). It is the least densely populated and most suburban borough of the city. The borough is coextensive with Richmond County, one of the 62 counties of New York state, and includes the southernmost point of the state.

Originally home to Lenape Native Americans, the island was settled by Dutch colonists in the 17th century. When the British took over, Richmond County became one of the 12 original counties of New York. Staten Island became one of the five boroughs of New York City during consolidation in 1898. Always known as Staten Island (anglicized from the original Dutch Staaten Eylandt), the borough was legally the Borough of Richmond until 1975, when its name was officially changed to Borough of Staten Island. Staten Island has sometimes been called "the forgotten borough" by inhabitants who feel neglected by the city government and the media. It has also been referred to as the "borough of parks" due to its 12,300 acres of protected parkland and over 170 parks.

The North Shore—especially the neighborhoods of St. George, Tompkinsville, Clifton, and Stapleton—is the island's most urban area. It includes the St. George Historic District and the St. Paul's Avenue-Stapleton Heights Historic District, both of which feature large Victorian houses. The East Shore is home to the 2 1/2-mile (4-kilometer) FDR Boardwalk, the world's fourth-longest boardwalk. The South Shore, site of the 17th-century Dutch and French Huguenot settlement, developed rapidly beginning in the 1960s and 1970s and is now very suburban. The West Shore has the island's fewest residents and the most industrial development.

Motor traffic can reach the borough from Brooklyn by the Verrazzano–Narrows Bridge and from New Jersey by the Outerbridge Crossing, Goethals Bridge, and Bayonne Bridge. Staten Island has Metropolitan Transportation Authority (MTA) bus lines and one MTA rapid transit line, the Staten Island Railway, which runs from the ferry terminal at St. George to Tottenville. Staten Island is the only borough not connected to the New York City Subway system. The free Staten Island Ferry connects the borough to Manhattan across New York Harbor, providing views of the Statue of Liberty, Ellis Island, and Lower Manhattan.

== History ==
=== Indigenous / Native American Inhabitants ===
As in much of North America, human habitation appeared on the island fairly rapidly after the Wisconsin glaciation. Archaeologists have recovered tool evidence of Clovis culture activity dating from about 14,000 years ago. This evidence was first discovered in 1917 in the Charleston section of the island. Various Clovis artifacts have been discovered since then, on property owned by Mobil Oil.

The island was probably abandoned later, possibly due to the extirpation of large mammals. Evidence of the first permanent Native American settlements and agriculture are thought to date from about 5,000 years ago, although early archaic habitation evidence has been found in multiple locations on the island.

Rossville points are distinct arrowheads that define a Native American cultural period from the Archaic period to the Early Woodland period, dating from about 1500 to 100 BC. They are named for the Rossville section of Staten Island, where they were first found near the old Rossville Post Office building.

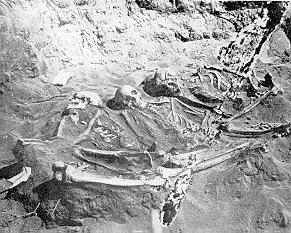
Skeletons unearthed at Lenape burial ground in Staten Island, the largest pre-European burial ground in New York City

At the time of European contact, the island was inhabited by the Raritan band of the Unami division of the Lenape. In Lenape, one of the Algonquian languages, Staten Island was called Aquehonga Manacknong, meaning "as far as the place of the bad woods", or Eghquhous, meaning "the bad woods". The name is spelled Eghquaons in the deed to Lubbertus van Dincklage for the purchase of Staten Island in 1657. The area was part of the Lenape homeland known as Lenapehoking. The Lenape were later called the "Delaware" by the English colonists because they inhabited both shores of what the English named the Delaware River.

The island was laced with Native American foot trails, one of which followed the south side of the ridge near the course of present-day Richmond Road and Amboy Road. The Lenape did not live in fixed encampments but moved seasonally, using slash and burn agriculture. Shellfish was a staple of their diet, including the Eastern oyster (Crassostrea virginica), abundant in the waterways throughout the present-day New York City region. Evidence of their habitation can still be seen in shell middens along the shore in the Tottenville section, where oyster shells larger than 12 inches (300 mm) are sometimes found.

Burial Ridge, a Lenape burial ground on a bluff overlooking Raritan Bay in Tottenville, is the largest pre-European burial ground in New York City. Bodies have been reported unearthed at Burial Ridge from 1858 onward. After conducting independent research, which included unearthing bodies interred at the site, ethnologist and archaeologist George H. Pepper was contracted in 1895 by the American Museum of Natural History to conduct paid archaeological research at Burial Ridge. The burial ground today is unmarked and lies within Conference House Park.

=== European settlement ===
The first recorded European contact on the island was in 1524 by Italian explorer Giovanni da Verrazzano, who sailed through The Narrows on the ship La Dauphine and anchored for one night.

The Dutch did not establish a permanent settlement on Staaten Eylandt for many decades. Its name is derived from the Staten Generaal, the parliament of the Republic of the Seven United Netherlands. From 1639 to 1655, Cornelis Melyn and David de Vries made three separate attempts to establish a settlement there, but each time the settlement was destroyed in conflicts between the Dutch and the local tribe. In 1661, the first permanent Dutch settlement was established at Oude Dorp (Dutch for "Old Village") by a small group of Dutch, Walloon, and French Huguenot families, just south of the Narrows near South Beach. Many French Huguenots had gone to the Netherlands as refugees from the religious wars in France, suffering persecution for their Protestant faith, and some joined the emigration to New Netherland.

At one point, nearly a third of the residents of the Island spoke French. The last vestige of Oude Dorp is the name of the present-day neighborhood of Old Town adjacent to Old Town Road. Staten Island was not spared the bloodshed which culminated in Kieft's War. In the summer of 1641 and in 1642, Native American tribes destroyed Old Town.

On July 10, 1657, the Native Americans signed a deed to Lubbertus van Dincklage, attorney of Henrick van der Capelle tho Ryssel, for the purchase of all indigenous lands on Staten Island. However, this deed was annulled when the Dutch purchasers failed to deliver the promised goods for the land a few months later.

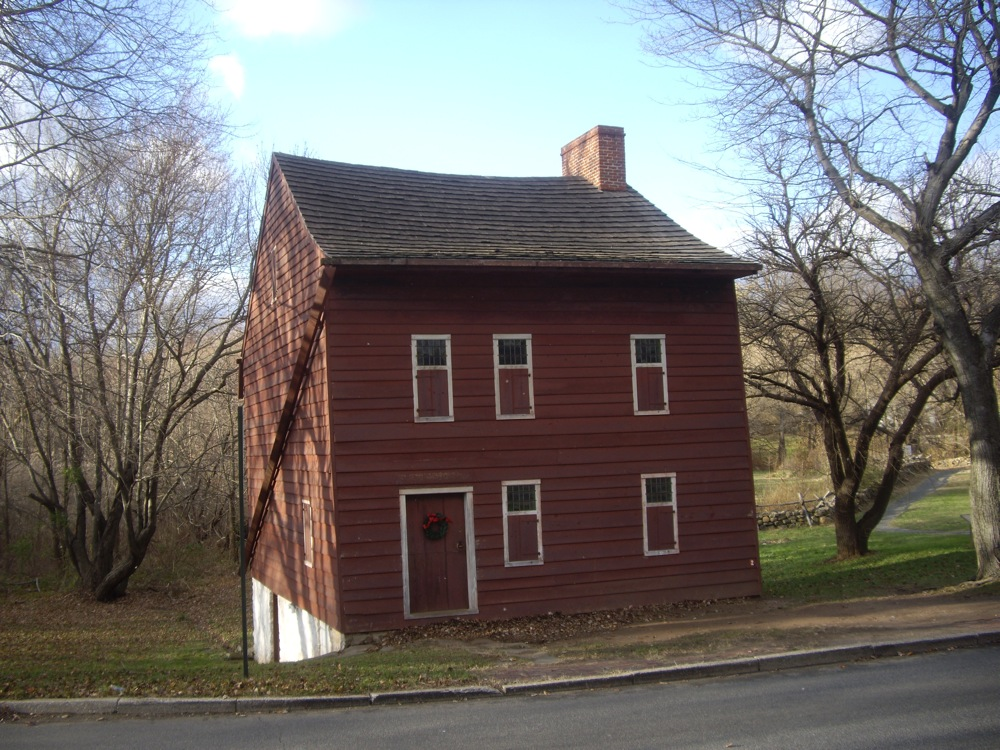
Voorlezer's House

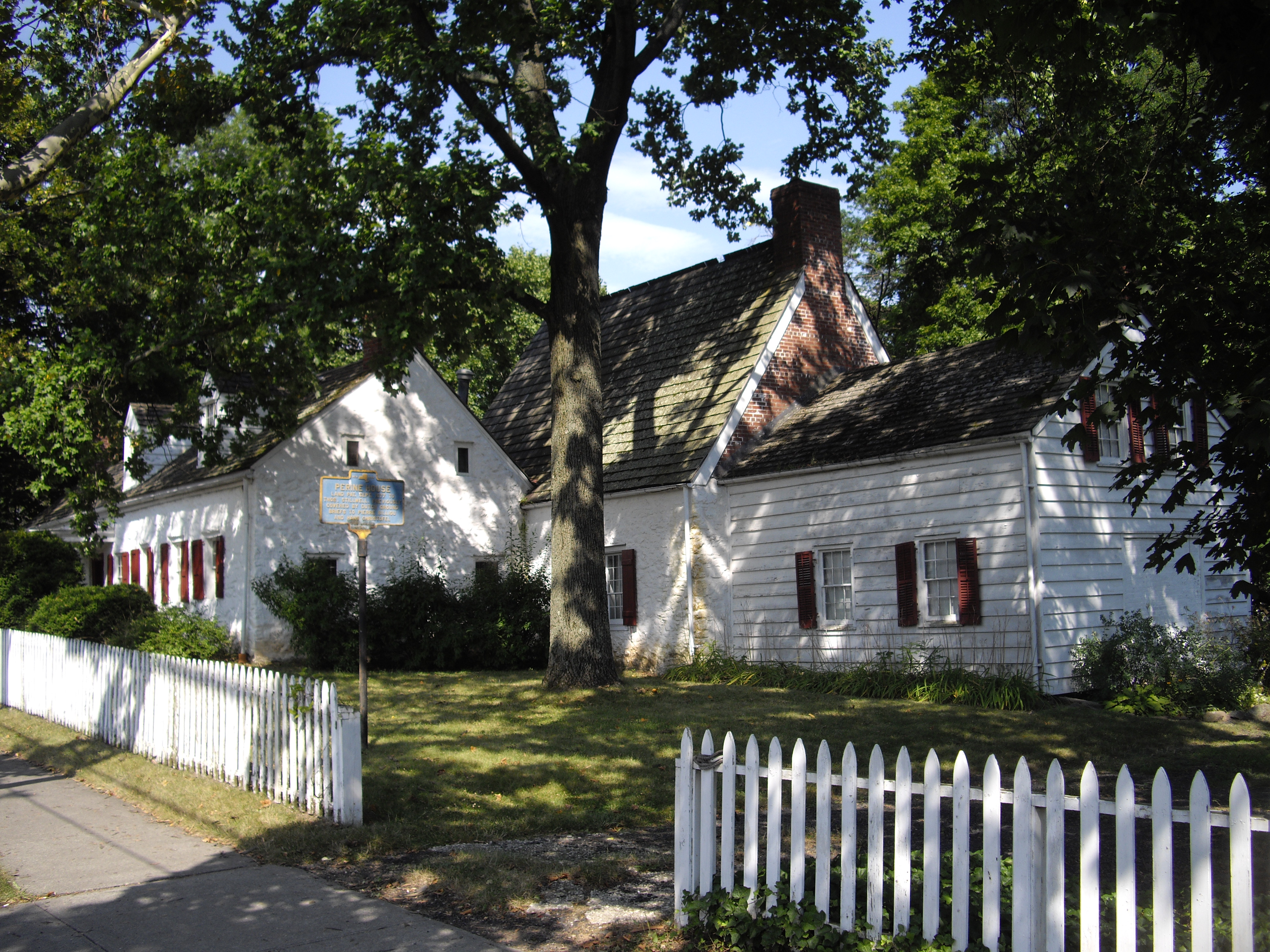
Billiou–Stillwell–Perine House

=== Richmond County ===
At the end of the Second Anglo-Dutch War in 1667, the Dutch ceded New Netherland to England in the Treaty of Breda. The Dutch Staaten Eylandt, anglicized as "Staten Island", became part of the new English colony of New York.

In 1670, the Native Americans ceded all claims to Staten Island to the English in a deed to Governor Francis Lovelace. In 1671, to encourage expansion of the Dutch settlements, the English resurveyed Oude Dorp (which became known as 'Old Town') and expanded the lots along the southern shore. These lots were settled primarily by Dutch families and became known as Nieuwe Dorp (meaning 'New Village'), which later became anglicized as New Dorp.

Captain Christopher Billopp, after years of service in the Royal Navy, came to America in 1674 along with the newly appointed royal governor of New York and the Jerseys, Sir Edmund Andros, in charge of a company of infantry. The following year, he settled on Staten Island, where he was granted a patent for 932 acres (3.8 km^{2}) of land. According to an apocryphal story, Captain Billopp's seamanship secured Staten Island to New York, rather than to New Jersey: the island would belong to New York if the captain could circumnavigate it in one day, which he did. There is conflicting information about the time Christopher Billopp took to complete the race and whether he received a personal prize for doing so. Mayor Michael Bloomberg perpetuated the myth by referring to it at a news conference in Brooklyn on February 20, 2007. Reliable historical documentation of the event is extremely sparse, and, in 1948, Staten Island historian Roswell S. Coles concluded that there was "no real evidence to assume there is any truth in the circumnavigation story." A 2007 The New York Times article concluded that this event was "almost certainly apocryphal" and originated in local folklore, with no written records of the deed before 1873, and a 2019 YouTube video by CGP Grey wasn't able to trace the story back before that 1873 account, which credits the story to Gabriel Disosway, a local chronicler who lived in Staten Island from 1798 through 1868.

In 1683, the colony of New York was divided into ten counties. As part of this process, Staten Island, along with several minor neighboring islands, was designated as Richmond County. The name derives from the title of Charles Lennox, 1st Duke of Richmond, an illegitimate son of King Charles II. In 1687 and 1688, the English divided the island into four administrative divisions based on natural features: the 5,100-acre (21 km^{2}) manorial estate of colonial governor Thomas Dongan in the northeastern hills known as the "Lordship or Manor of Cassiltown", along with the North, South, and West divisions. These divisions later evolved into the four towns of Castleton, Northfield, Southfield, and Westfield. In 1698, the population was 727.

The government granted land patents in rectangular blocks of 80 acres (320,000 m^{2}), with the most desirable lands along the coastline and inland waterways. By 1708, the entire island had been divided up in this fashion, creating 166 small farms and two large manorial estates, the Dongan estate and a 1,600 acres (6.5 km^{2}) parcel on the southwestern tip of the island belonging to Christopher Billopp. The first county seat was established in New Dorp in what was called Stony Brook at the time. In 1729, the county seat was moved to the village of Richmond Town, located at the headwaters of the Fresh Kills near the center of the island. By 1771, the island's population had grown to 2,847.

=== 18th century and the American Revolution ===
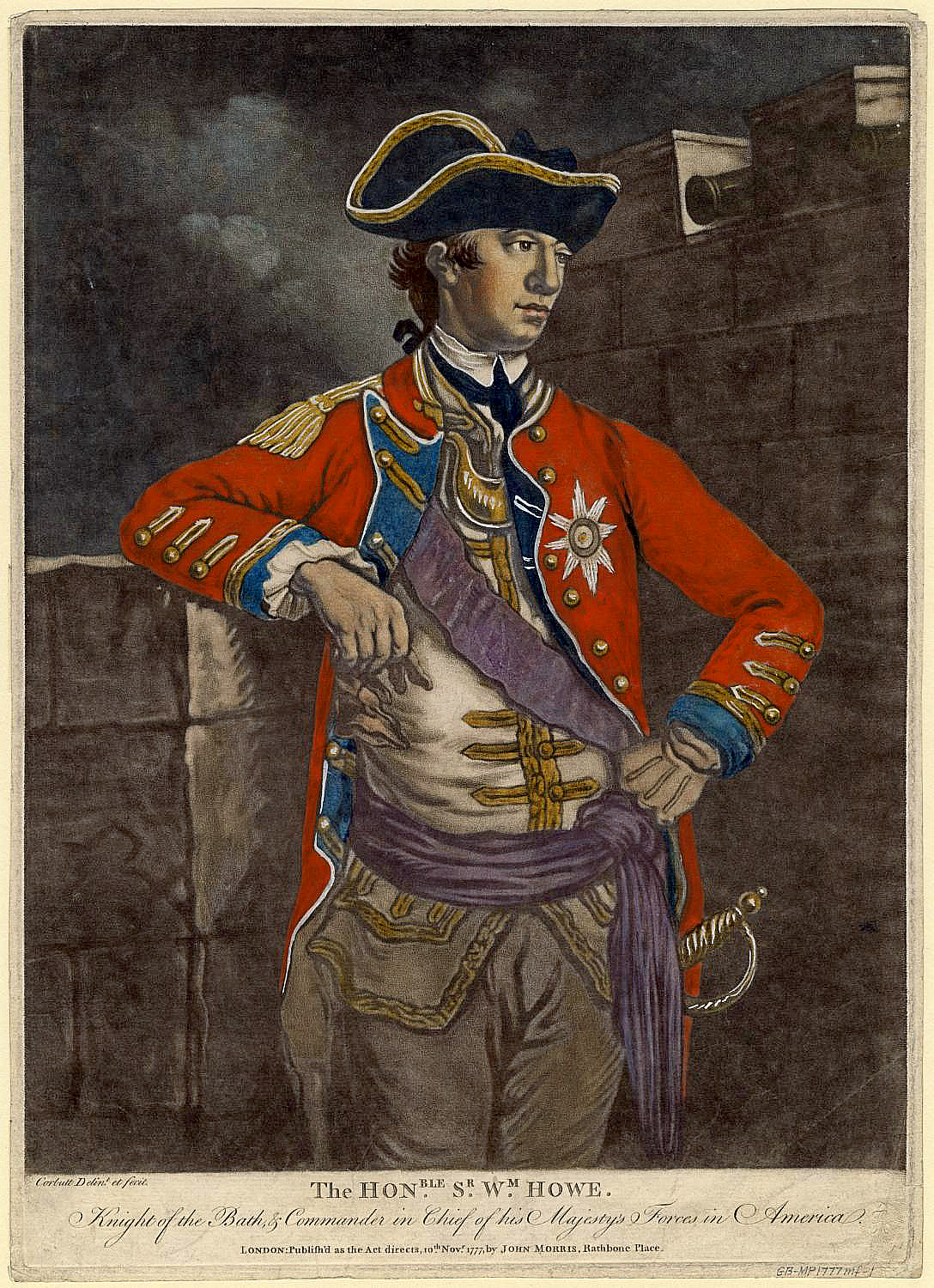
Sir William Howe established his headquarters at the Rose and Crown Tavern at New Dorp Lane and Richmond Road before the invasions of Long Island and Manhattan.

Most Staten Islanders were solidly supportive of the Crown, and the island played a significant role in the American Revolutionary War. General George Washington once called Islanders "our most inveterate enemies". As support of independence spread throughout the colonies, residents of the island were so uninterested that no representatives were sent to the First Continental Congress, the only county in New York to not send anyone. This had economic repercussions through 1776, when New Jersey towns such as Elizabethport, Woodbridge, and Dover instituted boycotts of islanders.

On March 17, 1776, the British garrison in Boston under Sir William Howe evacuated the city and sailed for Halifax, Nova Scotia. From Halifax, Howe prepared to attack New York City, which then consisted entirely of the southern end of Manhattan Island. General George Washington led the entire Continental Army to New York City in anticipation of Howe's attack. Howe used the strategic location of Staten Island as a staging ground for the invasion. Over 140 British ships arrived over the summer of 1776 and anchored off the shores of Staten Island at the entrance to New York Harbor. Onboard them were approximately 30,000 British and Hessian troops. Howe established his headquarters in New Dorp at the Rose and Crown Tavern, near the junction of present New Dorp Lane and Richmond Road. There, the representatives of the British government reportedly received their first notification of the Declaration of Independence.

In August 1776, British forces crossed the Narrows to Brooklyn and outflanked the Continental Army at the Battle of Long Island, resulting in the British control of the harbor and the capture of New York City shortly afterwards. Three weeks later, on September 11, 1776, Sir William's brother, Lord Howe, received a delegation of Americans consisting of Benjamin Franklin, Edward Rutledge, and John Adams at the Conference House on the southwestern tip of the island on the former estate of Christopher Billopp. The Americans refused Howe's peace offer, which called for the withdrawal of the Declaration of Independence, and the conference ended without an agreement.

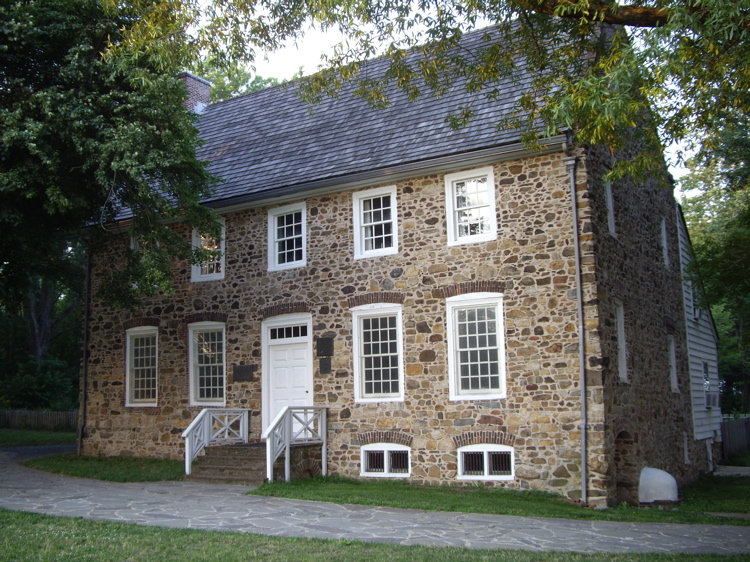
The Conference House

On August 22, 1777, the Battle of Staten Island occurred between British forces and several companies of the 2nd Canadian Regiment fighting alongside other American companies. The battle was inconclusive, though both sides lost over a hundred soldiers as prisoners of war; the Americans soon withdrew. In early 1780, while the Kill Van Kull was frozen over, William Alexander led an unsuccessful American raid from New Jersey on the western shore of Staten Island. It was repulsed in part by troops led by British Commander Francis Rawdon-Hastings, 1st Marquess of Hastings. In June 1780, Wilhelm von Knyphausen, a Hessian commander, led many raids and a full assault into New Jersey from Staten Island to defeat Washington and the Continental Army. Although the raids were successful in the Newark and Elizabeth areas, the advance was halted at Connecticut Farms (Union) and the Battle of Springfield.

British forces remained on Staten Island for the remainder of the war and kept their headquarters in neighborhoods such as Bulls Head. The few Patriots on the island fled after the Battle of Long Island, and the sentiment of those who remained was predominantly Loyalist. Even so, the islanders found the demands of supporting the troops to be heavy. Several buildings, including churches, were demolished for military use, and trees were felled for firewood, leading to extensive deforestation by the end of the war. The island was used as a staging ground for the final British evacuation of New York City on December 5, 1783. After their departure, many Loyalist landowners, such as Christopher Billop, the family of Canadian historian Peter Fisher, John Dunn, who founded St. Andrews, New Brunswick, and Abraham Jones, fled to Canada, and their estates were subdivided and sold. Staten Island was occupied by the British longer than any other single part of the Thirteen Colonies.

=== 19th century ===
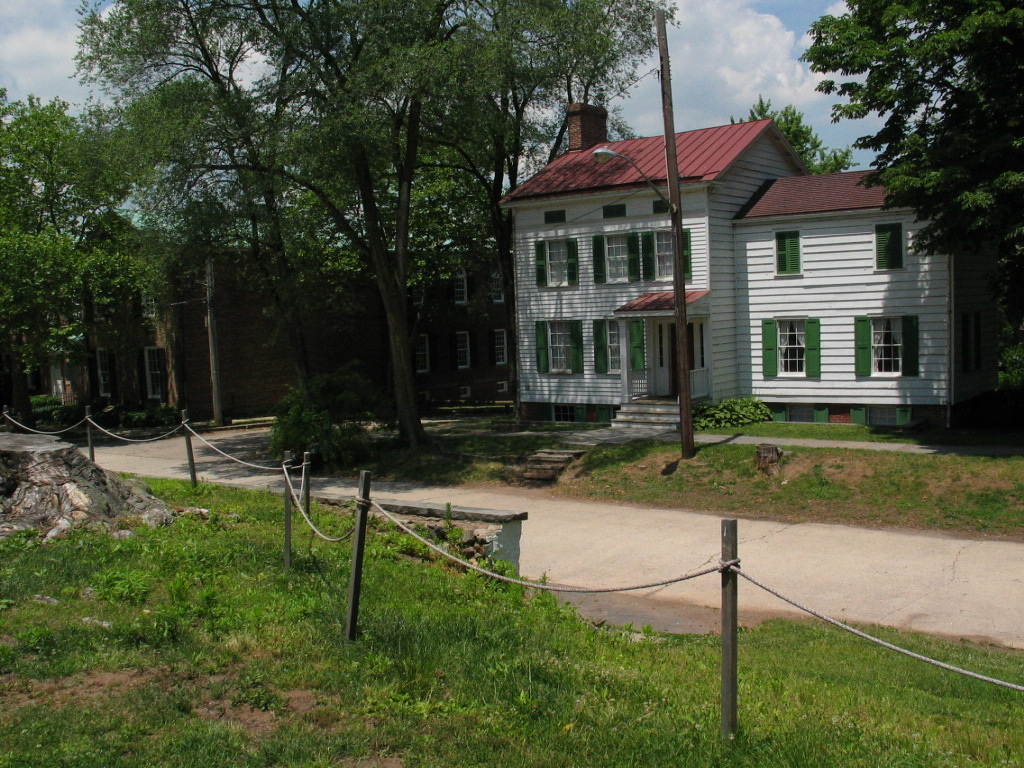
The Historic Richmond Town museum complex is located in the heart of Staten Island.

On July 4, 1827, the end of slavery in New York state was celebrated at the Swan Hotel in the West Brighton neighborhood. Rooms at the hotel were reserved months in advance as local abolitionists, including prominent free blacks, prepared for the festivities. Speeches, pageants, picnics, and fireworks marked the celebration, which lasted for two days.

In the early 19th century, New Jersey and New York disputed the location of their maritime boundary, due to their original charters being ambiguously worded. New York argued that the eastern edge of New Jersey was located at the Hudson River's shoreline during high tide, which would give New York control of all the docks and wharves on the Hudson River. New Jersey argued that the maritime boundary should run down the middle of the Hudson River and then extend out to the Atlantic Ocean, which would give New Jersey control of the docks and wharves, as well as Staten Island. Vice President Martin Van Buren negotiated a compromise that established the maritime boundary in the middle of the Hudson River and gave Staten Island to New York. Ellis Island and Bedloe's Island, both uninhabited at the time, also came under New Jersey control.

From 1800 to 1858, Staten Island was home to the largest quarantine facility in the United States. Angry residents burned down the hospital compound in 1858 in a series of attacks known as the Staten Island Quarantine War. In 1860, parts of Castleton and Southfield were made into a new town, Middletown. The Village of New Brighton in the town of Castleton was incorporated in 1866. In 1872, the Village of New Brighton annexed the remainder of the Town of Castleton, becoming coterminous with the town. The economy of Staten Island of the 19th century was more of a farming economy. Staten Island still experienced economic growth developing a industrial and commercial center nonetheless. A caveat to this growth was that the period of the Civil War caused a period of economic trouble which did not end until after the war. The population was rather spread out during the 19th century, as only ten communities in Staten Island had a population greater than 1,000. The Island had a population of 51,963 people in the year 1890.

An 1887 movement to incorporate Staten Island as a city was unsuccessful.

=== Consolidation with New York City ===
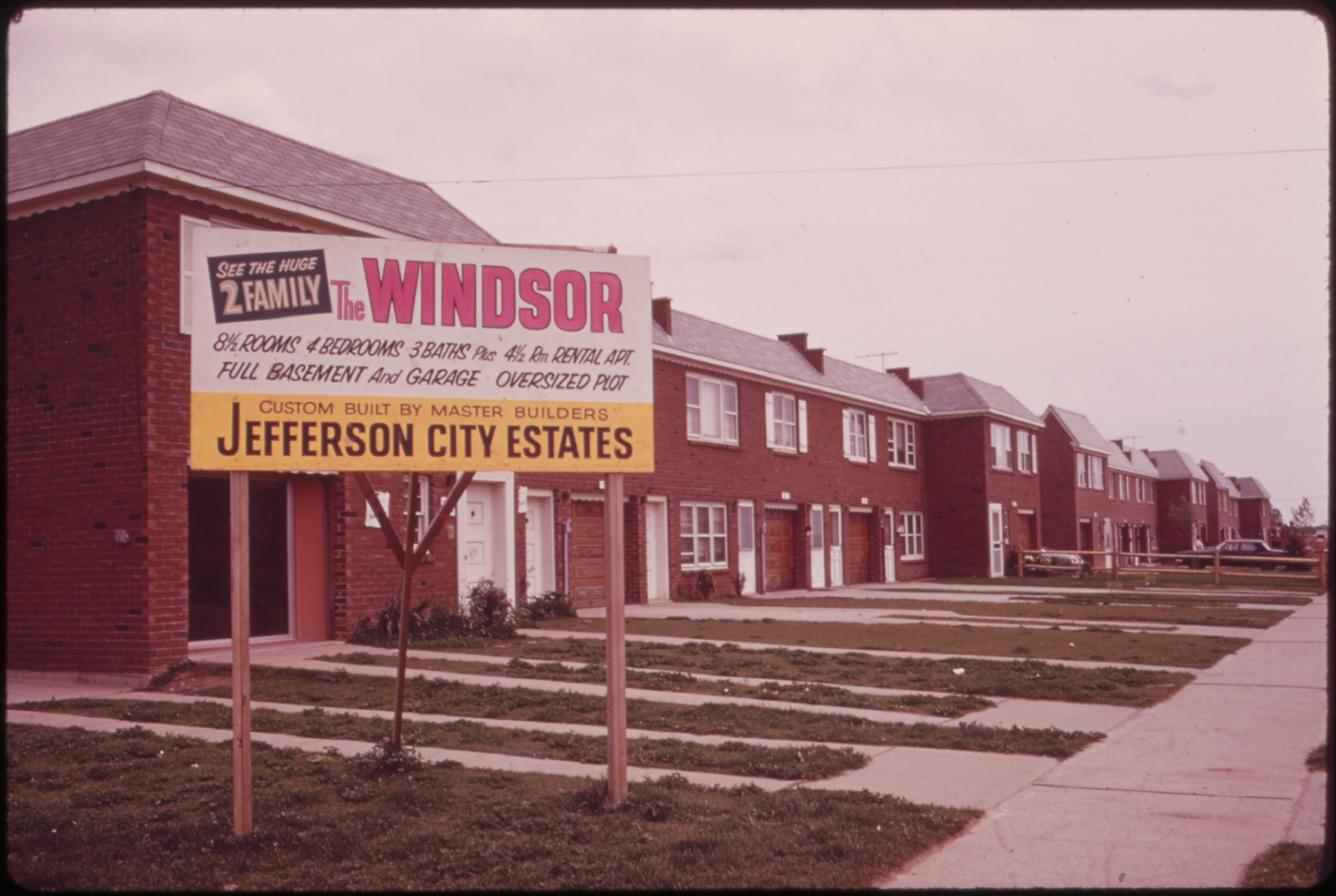
New housing on Staten Island, 1973, photo by Arthur Tress

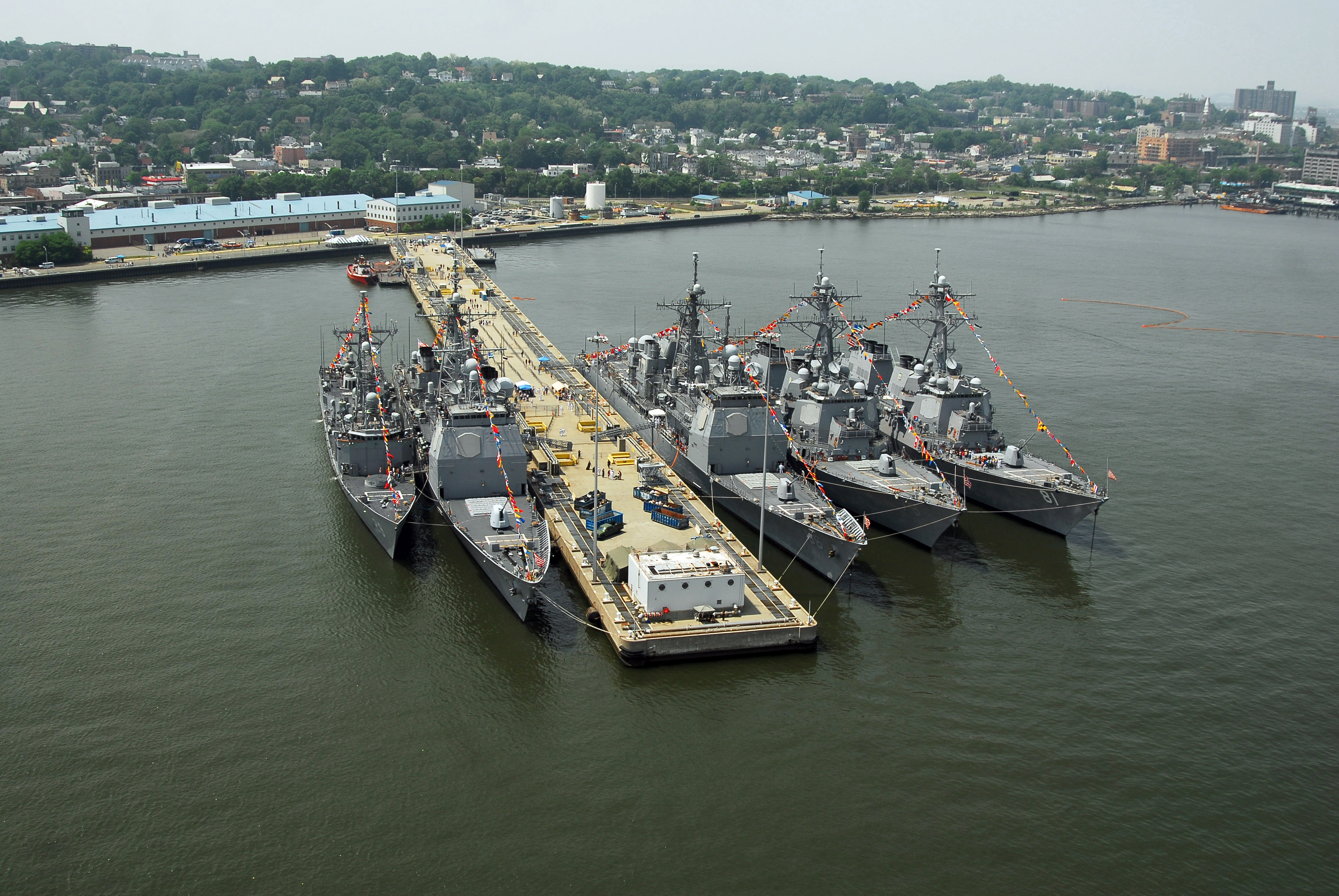
US Navy ships tied up at the home port pier during Fleet Week in 2007

The towns of Staten Island were dissolved in 1898 with the consolidation of the City of Greater New York, as Richmond County became one of the five boroughs of the expanded city. Although Staten Island was consolidated into the City of Greater New York in 1898, the county sheriff maintained control of the jail system, unlike the other boroughs, which had gradually transferred jail control to the Department of Correction. The jail system was not transferred until January 1, 1942. Staten Island is the only borough without a New York City Department of Correction major detention center.

The construction of the Verrazzano–Narrows Bridge, along with the other three major Staten Island bridges, created a new way for commuters and tourists to travel from New Jersey to Brooklyn, Manhattan, and areas farther east on Long Island. The network of highways running between the bridges has effectively carved up many of Staten Island's old neighborhoods. The bridge opened many areas of the borough to residential and commercial development from the 1960s onward, especially in the central and southern parts, which had been largely undeveloped. Staten Island's population doubled from 221,991 in 1960 to 443,728 in 2000. Nevertheless, Staten Island remained less developed than the rest of the city. A 1972 New York Times article stated that, despite the borough having 333,000 residents, parts of the island still maintained a bucolic atmosphere with woods and marshes. The last commercial farm in New York City, on Richmond Hill Road, closed in 2000.

Throughout the 1980s, a movement to secede from the city steadily grew in popularity, notably championed by longtime New York state senator and former Republican Party mayoral nominee John J. Marchi. The campaign reached its peak during the mayoral term of David Dinkins (1990–1993), after the U.S. Supreme Court invalidated the New York City Board of Estimate, which had given equal representation to the five boroughs. Dinkins and the city government opposed a non-binding secession referendum, contending that the state should not permit the vote unless the city issued a home rule message supporting it, which the city would not. Governor Mario Cuomo disagreed, and the vote went forward in 1993. Ultimately, 65% of Staten island residents voted to secede through the approval of a new city charter making Staten Island an independent city, but implementation was blocked in the State Assembly.

In the 1980s, the United States Navy had a base on Staten Island called Naval Station New York. It had two sections: a Strategic Homeport in Stapleton and a larger section near Fort Wadsworth, where the Verrazzano–Narrows Bridge enters the island. The base was closed in 1994 through the Base Realignment and Closure process because of its small size and the expense of basing personnel there.

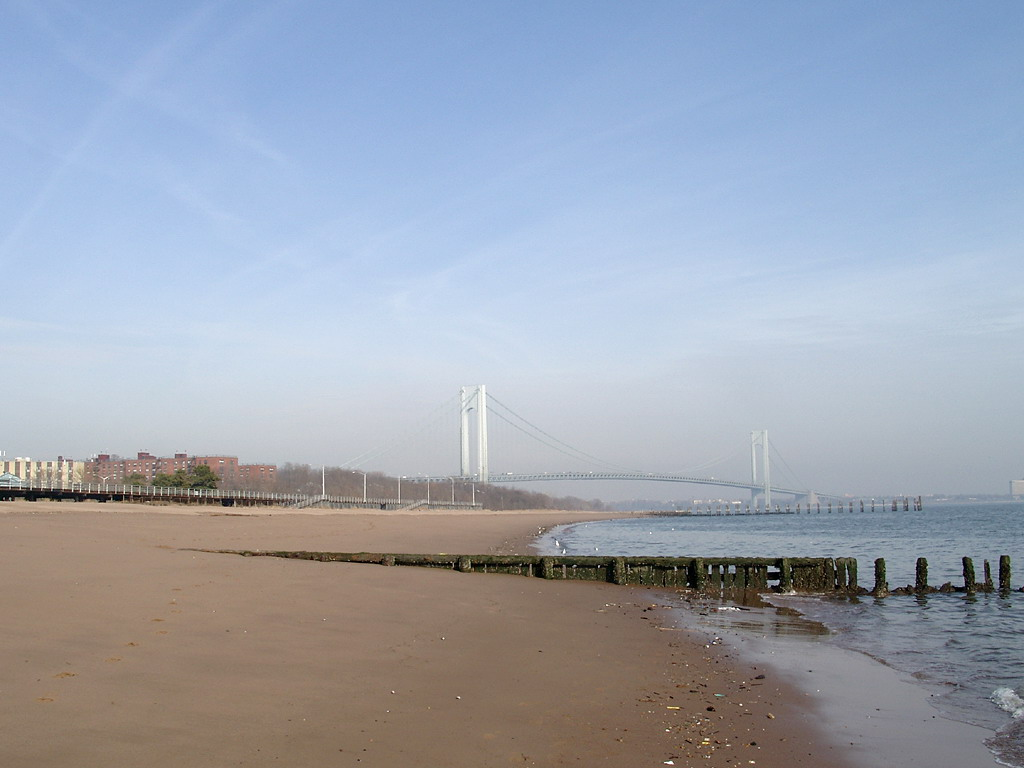
Verrazzano–Narrows Bridge from the South Beach on Staten Island

Fresh Kills and its tributaries are part of the largest tidal wetland ecosystem in the region. Its creeks and wetlands have been designated a Significant Coastal Fish and Wildlife Habitat by the New York State Department of Environmental Conservation. Opened along Fresh Kills as a "temporary landfill" in 1947, the Fresh Kills Landfill served as a repository for the city of New York's trash. The landfill, once the world's largest manufactured structure, was closed in 2001, but it was briefly reopened for the debris from Ground Zero following the September 11 attacks in 2001. It is being converted into a park, almost three times the size of Central Park, and the largest park to be developed in New York City in over 100 years. Plans for the park include a bird-nesting island, public roads, boardwalks, soccer and baseball fields, bridle paths, and a 5,000-seat stadium. Today, freshwater and tidal wetlands, fields, birch thickets, and a coastal oak maritime forest, as well as areas dominated by non-native plant species, are all within the boundaries of Fresh Kills.

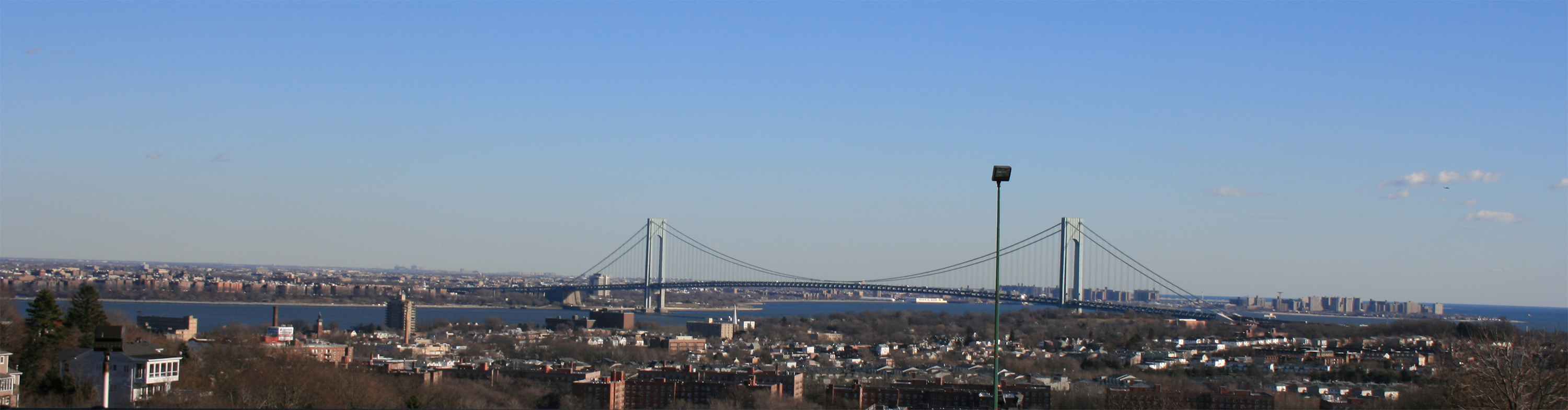
Verrazzano–Narrows Bridge connecting the eastern portion of the island to Brooklyn

== Geology ==
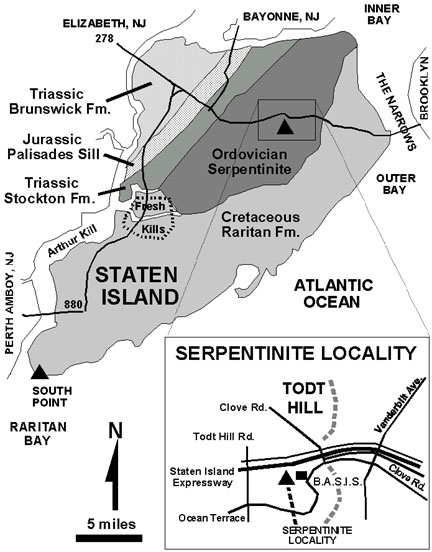
The geology of Staten Island

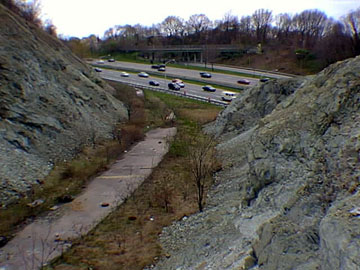
Serpentinite shown in rock cut along I-278 in Staten Island by Todt Hill marked on USGS geological map

During the Paleozoic Era, the tectonic plate containing the continent of Laurentia and the plate containing the continent of Gondwanaland were converging, the Iapetus Ocean that separated the two continents gradually closed, and the resulting collision between the plates formed the Appalachian Mountains. During the early stages of this mountain-building known as the Taconic orogeny, a piece of ocean crust from the Iapetus Ocean broke off and became incorporated into the collision zone and now forms the oldest bedrock strata of Staten Island, the serpentinite.

This strata of the Lower Paleozoic (approximately 430 million years old) consists predominantly of the serpentine minerals, antigorite, chrysotile, and lizardite; it also contains asbestos and talc. At the end of the Paleozoic era (248 million years ago) all major continental masses were joined into the supercontinent of Pangaea.

The Palisades Sill has been designated a National Natural Landmark, being "the best example of a thick diabase sill in the United States". It underlies a portion of northwest Staten Island, with a visible outcropping in Travis, off Travis Road in the William T. Davis Wildlife Refuge. This is the same formation that appears in New Jersey and upstate New York along the Hudson River in Palisades Interstate Park. The sill extends southward beyond the cliffs in Jersey City beneath the Upper New York Harbor and resurfaces on Staten Island. The Palisades sill date from the Early Jurassic period, 192 to 186 million years ago.

Staten Island has been at the southern terminus of various periods of glaciation. The most recent, the Wisconsin glaciation, ended approximately 12,000 years ago. The accumulated rock and sediment deposited at the glacier's terminus form the terminal moraine along the island's central portion. The evidence of these glacial periods is visible in the remaining wooded areas of Staten Island in the form of glacial erratics and kettle ponds.

At the retreat of the ice sheet, Staten Island was connected by land to Long Island, as the Narrows had not yet formed. Geologists' reckonings of the course of the Hudson River have placed it alternatively through the present course of the Raritan River, south of the island, or through present-day Flushing Bay and Jamaica Bay.

== Geography ==
Location of Staten Island (red) within New York City (remainder yellow)

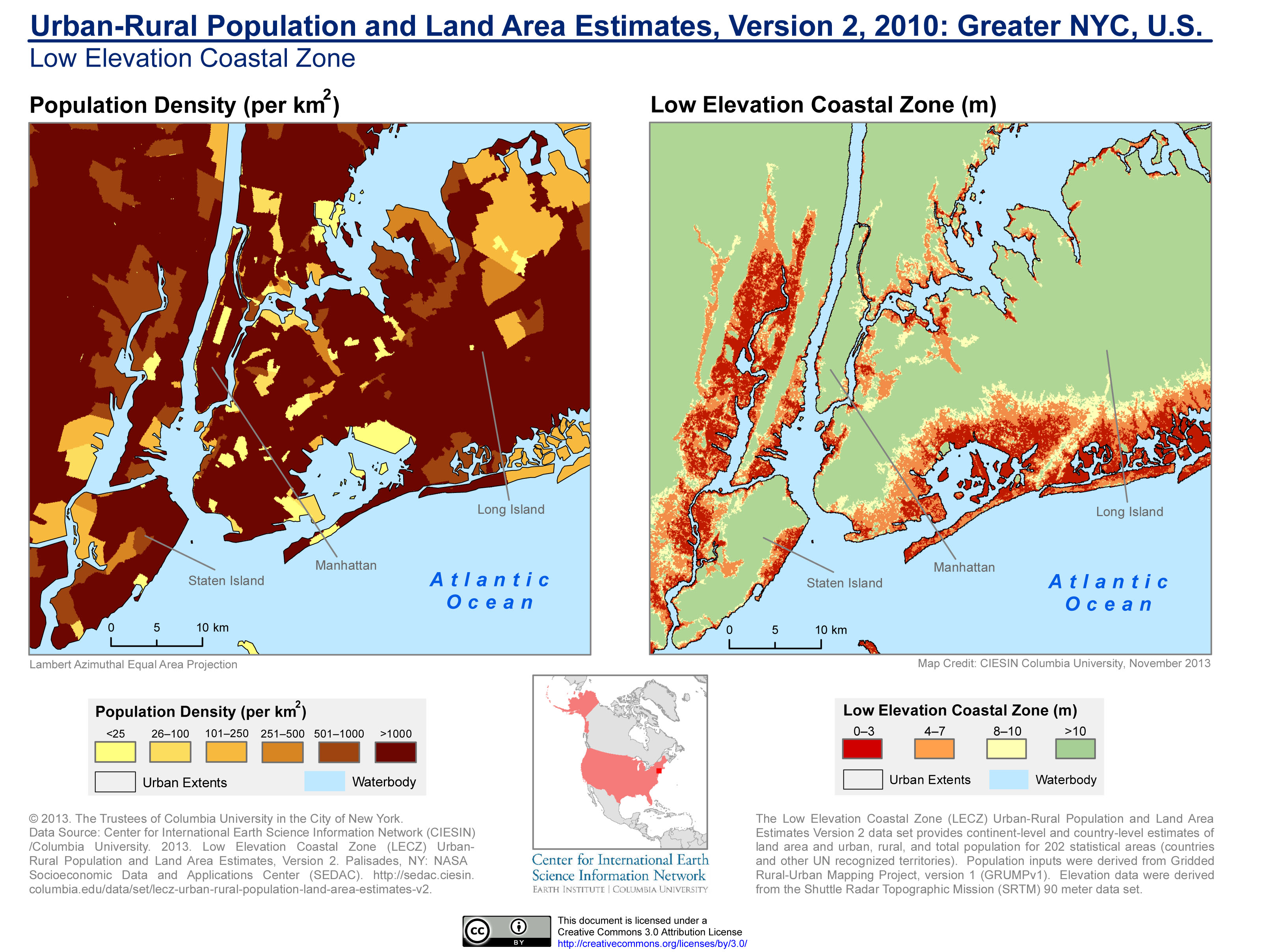
Population density and elevation above sea level in Greater NYC, U.S. (2010). Staten Island is especially vulnerable to sea level rise.

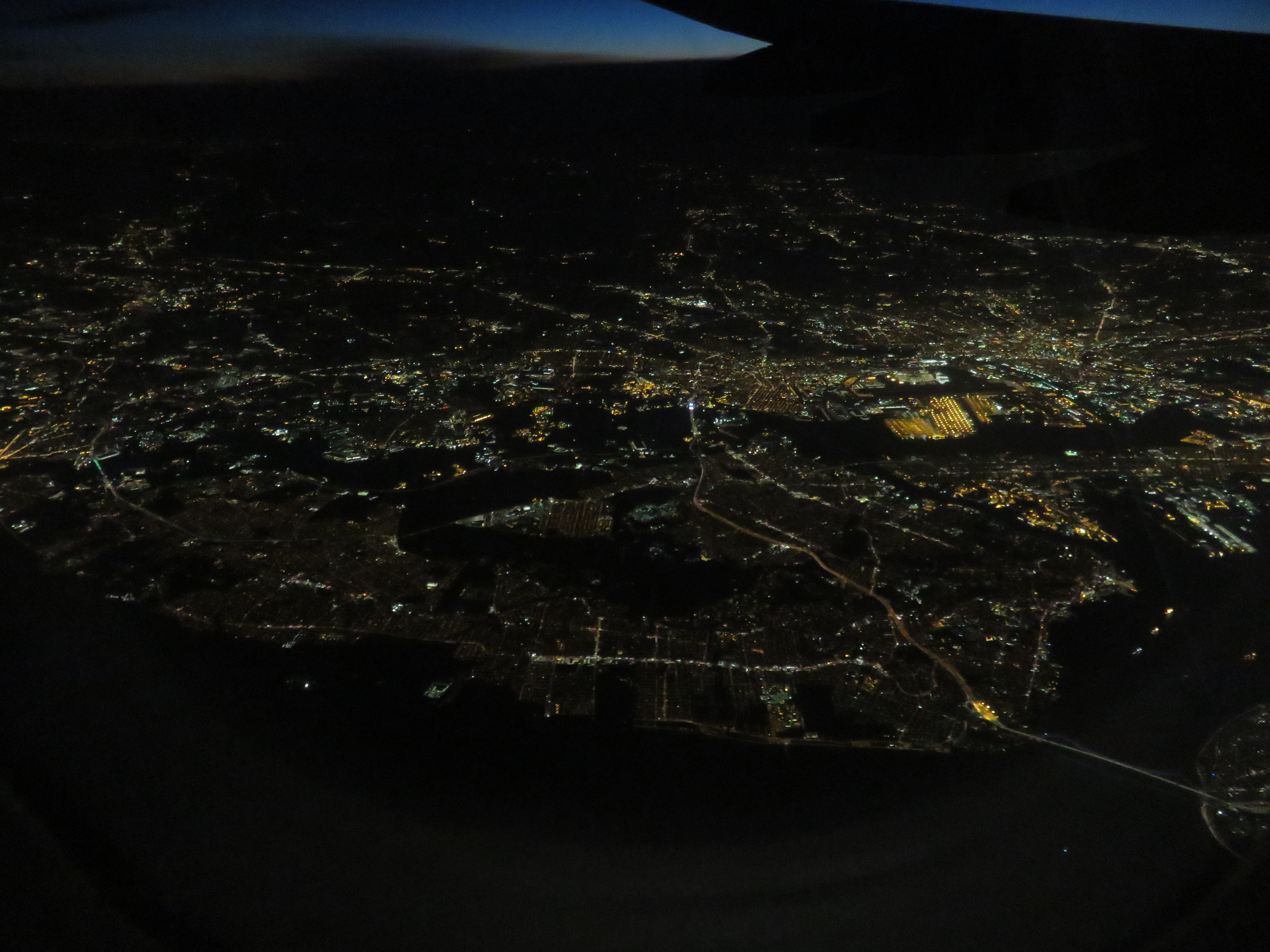
Aerial view of Staten Island from the east at night

According to the U.S. Census Bureau, Richmond County has a total area of 102.5 square miles (265 km^{2}), of which 58.5 square miles (152 km^{2}) is land and 44.0 square miles (114 km^{2}) (43%) is water. It is the third-smallest county in New York by land area and fourth-smallest by total area.

Although Staten Island is a borough of New York City, the island is geographically part of New Jersey. Staten Island is separated from Long Island by the Narrows and from mainland New Jersey by the Arthur Kill and the Kill Van Kull. Staten Island is positioned at the center of New York Bight, a sharp bend in the shoreline between New Jersey and Long Island. The region is considered vulnerable to sea-level rise. On October 29, 2012, the island experienced severe damage and loss of life along with the destruction of many homes during Hurricane Sandy.

In addition to the main island, the borough and county also include several small uninhabited islands:

- The Isle of Meadows (at the mouth of Fresh Kills)
- Prall's Island (in the Arthur Kill)
- Shooters Island (in Newark Bay; part of it is in New Jersey)
- Swinburne Island (in Lower New York Bay)
- Hoffman Island (in Lower New York Bay)

The highest point on the island, the summit of Todt Hill, elevation 401 ft (122 m), is also the highest point in the five boroughs, as well as the highest point on the Atlantic coastal plain south of Great Blue Hill in Massachusetts and the highest point on the coast proper south of Maine's Camden Hills. Ward's Point in the neighborhood of Tottenville is the southernmost point in the state of New York.

Staten Island is the only borough in New York City that does not share a land border with another borough (Marble Hill in Manhattan is contiguous with the Bronx). The borough has a land border with Elizabeth and Bayonne, New Jersey, on uninhabited Shooters Island. It has several maritime borders with New Jersey communities, such as Perth Amboy, Cliffwood Beach section of Old Bridge, Union Beach, and Keansburg.

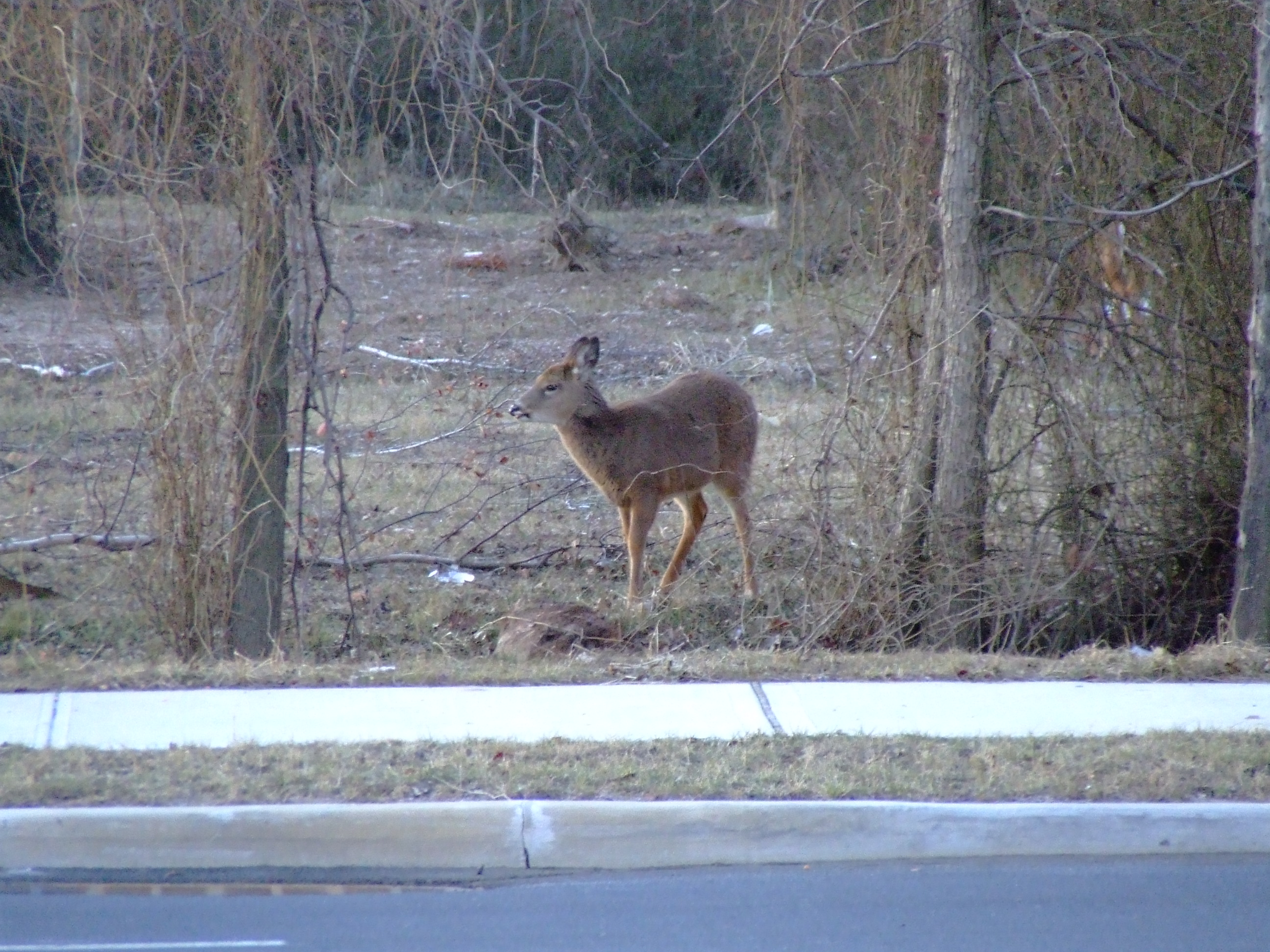
A deer found in Charleston, Staten Island; the deer may be part of a 40-large herd in Clay Pit Ponds State Park Preserves.

=== Wildlife ===
Staten Island is home to a large and diverse population of wildlife. Wildlife found on Staten Island include white-tailed deer (which have increased from a population of 24 in 2008 to 2,000 in 2017 due to a hunting ban and a lack of predators), as well as hundreds of species of birds including bald eagles, turkey, hawks, egrets and ring-necked pheasants. Staten Island is home to Atlantic horseshoe crabs, cottontail rabbits, opossums, raccoons, garter snakes, red-eared slider turtles, newts, spring peeper frogs, leopard frogs, fox, box turtles, skunks, northern snapping turtles and common snapping turtles. In 2014 a new species of frog, the Atlantic Coast Leopard Frog (Lithobates kauffeldi), was described from Staten Island.

=== Parkland ===
Staten Island includes thousands of acres of federal, state, and local park land, including the "greenbelt" and "blue belt" park systems and the Gateway National Recreation Area, in addition to hundreds of acres of private wooded areas. The National Park Service maintains full-time wildland firefighters to patrol Staten Island sites in wildfire brush trucks.

The parks on Staten Island are managed by various state, federal, and local agencies.

Five sites are part of the 26,000-acre (110 km^{2}) Gateway National Recreation Area, managed by the U.S. National Park Service and patrolled by the United States Park Police:

- Great Kills Park
- Miller Field
- Fort Wadsworth
- Hoffman Island
- Swinburne Island

Two New York State parks are managed by the New York State Office of Parks, Recreation and Historic Preservation:

- Mount Loretto Unique Area
- Clay Pit Ponds State Park Preserve

New York State Park Police officers patrol these parks and the surrounding streets.

359 acres (145 ha) of State Forests, state wildlife management areas, and Wetlands are managed by the New York State Department of Environmental Conservation:

- Saint Francis Woodland
- Butler Manor Woods
- Arden Heights Woods
- Todt Hill Woods
- North Mount Loretto State Forest
- Lemon Creek Tidal Wetland Wildlife Management Area
- Blosers Wetland Wildlife Management Area
- Goethal Pond Wetland
- Bridge Creek Tidal Wetland
- Old Place Creek Tidal Wetland
- Oakwood Beach Wetland
- Sharrotts Shoreline Natural Resource Area
- Sawmill Creek Wetland

The 359 acres (145 ha) of NYS Department of Environmental Conservation land throughout the island are patrolled by New York State Department of Environmental Conservation Police officers and one NYS DEC Forest Ranger, who has the dual task of law enforcement and fire suppression.

The New York City Department of Parks and Recreation manages 156 parks including:

- Conference House Park
- Willowbrook Park
- Graniteville Quarry Park
- Silver Lake Park
- Clove Lakes Park

The Fresh Kills Landfill was the world's largest landfill before closing in 2001, although it was temporarily reopened that year to receive debris from the September 11 attacks. The landfill is being redeveloped as Freshkills Park, an area devoted to restoring habitat. The park will become New York City's second-largest public park when completed.

=== Adjacent counties ===
==== New Jersey ====
- Hudson County — north and northeast
- Union County — northwest
- Middlesex County — west and southwest
- Monmouth County — south

==== New York ====
- Kings County — east
- New York County — northeast

== Demographics ==
Historical population
Census	Pop.	Note	%±
1790	3,835		—
1800	4,564		19.0%
1810	5,347		17.2%
1820	6,135		14.7%
1830	7,082		15.4%
1840	10,965		54.8%
1850	15,061		37.4%
1860	25,492		69.3%
1870	33,029		29.6%
1880	38,991		18.1%
1890	51,713		32.6%
1900	67,021		29.6%
1910	85,969		28.3%
1920	116,531		35.6%
1930	158,346		35.9%
1940	174,441		10.2%
1950	191,555		9.8%
1960	221,991		15.9%
1970	295,443		33.1%
1980	352,029		19.2%
1990	378,977		7.7%
2000	443,728		17.1%
2010	468,730		5.6%
2020	495,747		5.8%
2025 (est.)	501,290	▲	1.1%
U.S. Decennial Census; 1790–1960 1900–1990; 1990–2000 2010 2020

New York City's five boroughs
Jurisdiction		Population	Land area		Density of population		GDP
Borough	County	Census (2020)	square miles	square km	people/ sq. mile	people/ sq. km	billions (US$, 2024) ^{2}
The Bronx	Bronx	1,472,654	42.2	109.2	34,920	13,482	58.323
Brooklyn	Kings	2,736,074	69.4	179.7	39,438	15,227	145.934
Manhattan	New York	1,694,251	22.7	58.7	74,781	28,872	1,006.673
Queens	Queens	2,405,464	108.7	281.6	22,125	8,542	143.131
Staten Island	Richmond	495,747	57.5	149.0	8,618	3,327	23.779
City of New York		8,804,190	300.5	778.2	29,303	11,314	1,354.061
State of New York		20,201,249	47,123.6	122,049.5	429	166	2,297.028
Sources: and see individual borough articles.

Race	2020	2010	1990	1970	1950
White	59.6%	72.9%	85%	94%	97.1%
—Non-Hispanic	56.1%	64.0%	80%	n/a	n/a
Black or African American	10.5%	10.6%	8.1%	5.3%	2.8%
Hispanic or Latino (of any race)	19.6%	17.3%	8%	n/a	n/a
Asian	12.0%	7.5%	4.5%	0.4%	0.1%
Two or more races	7.8%	2.6%	n/a	n/a	n/a

As of the 2018 estimate, 22.2% of residents are foreign-born. 11.9% of residents live below the poverty line, the lowest of the five boroughs. Average per capita income was $33,922, while median household income was $76,244. There are 181,199 housing units, with a 69.5% owner occupancy rate, the highest of the five boroughs, as well as a median value of $460,200. There are 166,150 households, with an average of 2.82 persons per household.

At the 2010 census, 468,730 people lived in Staten Island, an increase of 5.6% from the 2000 census. Staten Island is the only New York City borough with a non-Hispanic White majority. According to the 2010 census, 64.0% of the population was non-Hispanic White, down from 79% in 1990, 10.6% Black or African American, 0.4% American Indian and Alaska Native, 7.5% Asian, 0.2% from some other race (non-Hispanic) and 2.6% of two or more races. 17.3% of Staten Island's population was of Hispanic or Latino origin (of any race).

In 2009, approximately 20.0% of the population was foreign-born, and 1.8% were born in Puerto Rico, U.S. Island areas, or abroad to American parents. Approximately 28.6% of the population aged 5 and older spoke a language other than English at home, and 27.3% of the population aged 25 and older held a bachelor's degree or higher.

According to the 2009 American Community Survey, the borough's population was 75.7% White (65.8% non-Hispanic White alone), 10.2% Black or African American (9.6% non-Hispanic Black or African American alone), 0.2% American Indian and Alaska Native, 7.4% Asian, 0.0% Native Hawaiian and Other Pacific Islander, 4.6% from Some other race, and 1.9% from Two or more races. Hispanics or Latinos of any race made up 15.9% of the population. According to the survey, the top ten European ancestries were the following:

- Italian: 33.7%
- Irish: 14.2%
- German: 5.7%
- Russian: 3.8%
- Polish: 3.4%
- Albanian: 1.9%
- English: 1.6%
- Ukrainian: 1.3%
- Norwegian: 1.0%
- Greek: 1.0%

The borough has the highest proportion of Italian Americans of any county in the United States. There is a significant Jewish community mainly in the Willowbrook area. Since the 2000 census, a large Russian community has been growing on Staten Island, particularly in the Rossville, South Beach, and Great Kills area. There is also a significant Polish community mainly in the South Beach and Midland Beach area, and there is also a large Sri Lankan community on Staten Island, concentrated mainly on Victory Boulevard on the northeastern tip of Staten Island towards St. George. The Little Sri Lanka in the Tompkinsville neighborhood is one of the largest Sri Lankan communities outside of the country of Sri Lanka. The island has more Liberians than anywhere outside Liberia and has included three Liberian heads of state: David D. Kpormakpor, Ruth Perry, and George Weah. The borough is also home to a Chinanteco-speaking Indigenous Mexican American community.

Most of the borough's African American and Hispanic residents live north of the Staten Island Expressway, or Interstate 278. In terms of religion, the borough's population is largely Roman Catholic, peaking near 60% in the 2000 census. The Jewish community is slightly less numerous compared to other parts of the New York metropolitan area.

Per the 2009 American Community Survey, the median household income was $55,039, and the median family income was $64,333. Males had a median income of $50,081 versus $35,914 for females. The per capita income for the borough was $23,905. About 7.9% of families and 10.0% of the population were below the poverty line, including 13.2% of those under age 18 and 9.9% of those age 65 or over.

If each borough were ranked as a separate city, Staten Island would be the 44th most-populous in the United States.

=== Languages ===
As of 2010, 70.39% (306,310) of Staten Island residents age 5 and older spoke only English at home, while 10.02% (43,587) spoke Spanish, 3.14% (13,665) Russian, 3.11% (13,542) Italian, 2.39% (10,412) Chinese, 1.81% (7,867) other Indo-European languages, 1.38% (5,990) Arabic, 1.01% (4,390) Polish, 0.88% (3,812) Korean, 0.80% (3,500) Tagalog, 0.76% (3,308) Sinhala, 0.62% (2,717) Urdu, 0.57% (2,479) other Indic languages, and African languages were spoken as a first language by 0.56% (2,458) of the population over the age of five. In total, 29.61% (128,827) of Staten Island's population age 5 and older spoke a first language other than English.

== Government and politics ==
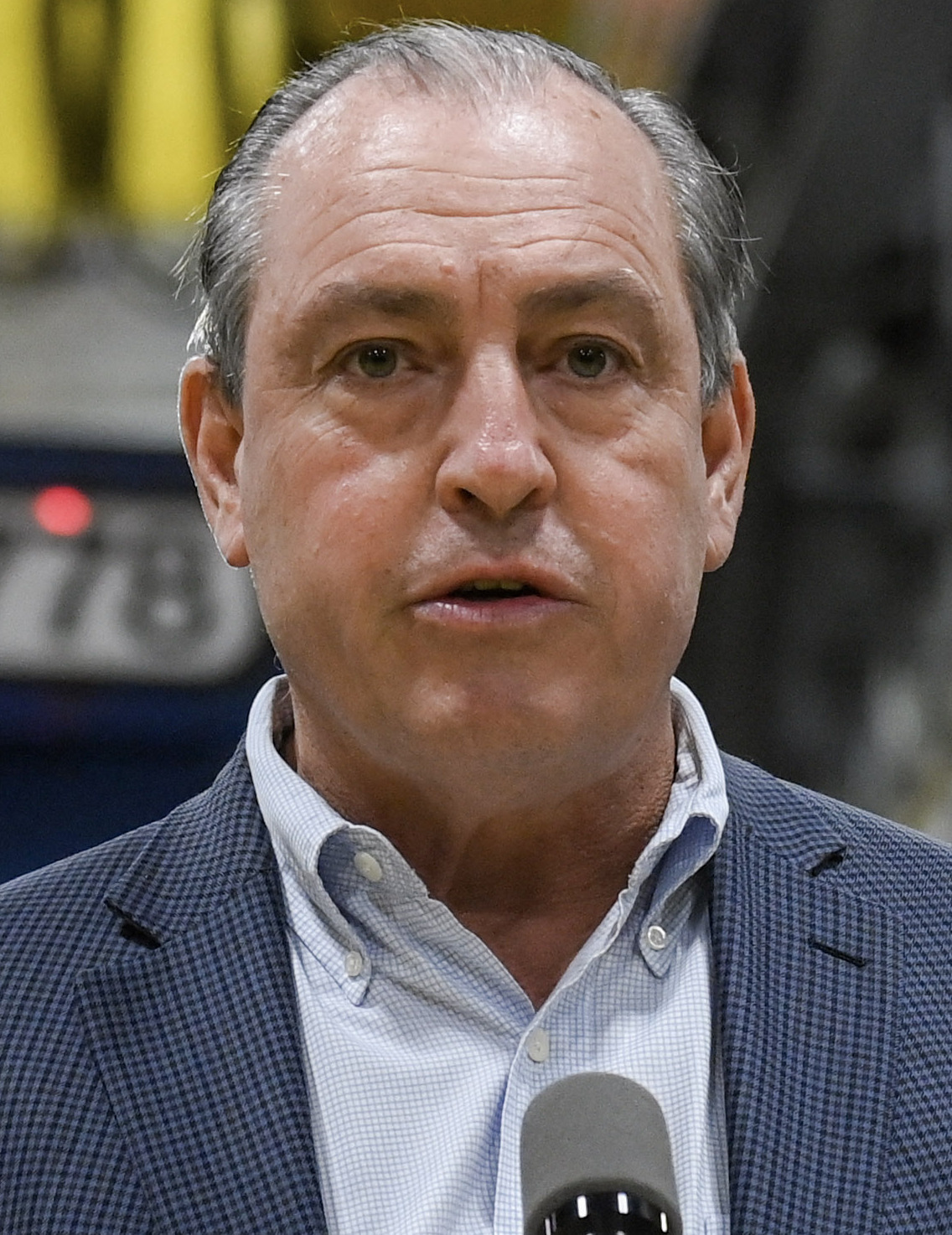
Staten Island borough president Vito Fossella

=== History ===
United States presidential election results for Richmond County, New York
Year	Republican / Whig		Democratic		Third party(ies)	
Year	No.	%	No.	%	No.	%
1828	475	47.83%	518	52.17%	0	0.00%
1832	537	48.33%	574	51.67%	0	0.00%
1836	649	50.00%	649	50.00%	0	0.00%
1840	903	51.19%	861	48.81%	0	0.00%
1844	1,049	49.65%	1,063	50.31%	1	0.05%
1848	1,099	52.79%	860	41.31%	123	5.91%
1852	1,147	45.83%	1,324	52.90%	32	1.28%
1856	736	22.77%	1,550	47.94%	947	29.29%
1860	1,408	37.27%	2,370	62.73%	0	0.00%
1864	1,565	35.25%	2,875	64.75%	0	0.00%
1868	2,216	42.30%	3,023	57.70%	0	0.00%
1872	2,611	51.51%	2,458	48.49%	0	0.00%
1876	2,883	39.92%	4,339	60.08%	0	0.00%
1880	3,291	40.60%	4,815	59.40%	0	0.00%
1884	3,164	37.39%	5,135	60.68%	164	1.94%
1888	4,100	40.82%	5,764	57.39%	179	1.78%
1892	4,091	38.09%	6,122	57.00%	528	4.92%
1896	6,170	55.10%	4,452	39.76%	576	5.14%
1900	6,042	45.77%	6,759	51.20%	400	3.03%
1904	7,000	47.72%	7,182	48.96%	486	3.31%
1908	6,831	45.29%	7,401	49.07%	852	5.65%
1912	3,035	19.26%	8,445	53.60%	4,277	27.14%
1916	7,319	44.36%	8,843	53.60%	336	2.04%
1920	17,844	63.15%	9,373	33.17%	1,041	3.68%
1924	18,007	47.91%	15,801	42.04%	3,778	10.05%
1928	24,995	46.09%	28,945	53.37%	294	0.54%
1932	21,278	35.26%	36,857	61.08%	2,210	3.66%
1936	22,852	32.47%	46,229	65.68%	1,308	1.86%
1940	38,911	50.23%	38,307	49.45%	249	0.32%
1944	42,188	57.07%	31,502	42.62%	228	0.31%
1948	39,539	54.06%	30,442	41.62%	3,153	4.31%
1952	55,993	66.21%	28,280	33.44%	294	0.35%
1956	64,233	76.58%	19,644	23.42%	0	0.00%
1960	50,356	56.50%	38,673	43.39%	94	0.11%
1964	42,330	45.54%	50,524	54.36%	92	0.10%
1968	54,631	55.28%	34,770	35.18%	9,423	9.54%
1972	84,686	74.21%	29,241	25.62%	196	0.17%
1976	56,995	54.11%	47,867	45.45%	464	0.44%
1980	64,885	58.64%	37,306	33.72%	8,456	7.64%
1984	83,187	65.08%	44,345	34.69%	294	0.23%
1988	77,427	61.46%	47,812	37.95%	736	0.58%
1992	70,707	47.85%	56,901	38.51%	20,152	13.64%
1996	52,207	40.78%	64,684	50.53%	11,116	8.68%
2000	63,903	44.96%	73,828	51.94%	4,398	3.09%
2004	90,325	56.40%	68,448	42.74%	1,370	0.86%
2008	86,062	51.66%	79,311	47.61%	1,205	0.72%
2012	74,223	48.14%	78,181	50.71%	1,776	1.15%
2016	101,437	56.05%	74,143	40.97%	5,380	2.97%
2020	123,320	56.89%	90,997	41.98%	2,450	1.13%
2024	128,151	63.90%	69,345	34.58%	3,062	1.53%

Since New York City's consolidation in 1898, Staten Island has been governed by the New York City Charter that provides for a "strong" mayor-council system. The centralized New York City government is responsible for public education, correctional institutions, libraries, public safety, recreational facilities, sanitation, water supply, and welfare services on Staten Island.

The office of Borough president was created during the 1898 consolidation to balance centralization with local authority. Each borough president had a powerful administrative role, derived from a vote on the New York City Board of Estimate, which was responsible for creating and approving the city's budget and land-use proposals.

The Office of the Borough President became a focal point for opinions on the Vietnam War when former intelligence agent and peace activist Ed Murphy ran for office in 1973, sponsored by the Staten Island Democratic Association. Murphy's combat veteran status deflected traditional right-wing attacks against liberals, and the campaign helped spur the emergence of more liberal politics on Staten Island. In Board of Estimate of City of New York v. Morris (1989), the Supreme Court of the United States declared the Board of Estimate unconstitutional because Brooklyn, the most populous borough, had no greater effective representation on the board than Staten Island, the least populous borough, a violation of the Fourteenth Amendment's Equal Protection Clause pursuant to the high court's 1964 "one man, one vote" decision.

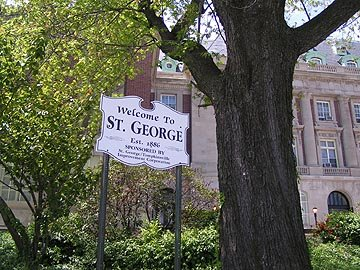
Borough Hall in St. George, Staten Island

Since 1990, the Borough president has acted as an advocate for the borough before mayoral agencies, the City Council, the New York State government, and corporations. Staten Island's Borough President is Vito Fossella, a Republican who was elected in November 2021. Fossella is the only Republican borough president in New York City.

=== Staten Island flag ===
The Staten Island flag uses its old borough seal as a flag.

=== Politics ===
Staten Island's politics differ considerably from the rest of New York City. While the other four boroughs tend to be strongly Democratic, Staten Island is considered the most conservative, and the only one where Republicans usually do well. Although in 2005 44.7% of the borough's registered voters were registered Democrats and 30.6% were registered Republicans, the Republican Party holds a majority of local public offices. Staten Island is the base of New York City's Republican Party in citywide elections.

The Staten Island Expressway demarcates the borough's main political divide; areas north of the Expressway tend to be more liberal, while those south are more conservative. Local party platforms center on affordable housing, education, and law and order. Two out of Staten Island's three New York City Council members are Republicans.

In national elections, Staten Island is a Republican-leaning county. Staten Island has voted for a Democratic presidential nominee only four times since 1940: in 1964, 1996, 2000, and 2012. In the 2008 presidential election, Republican John McCain won 52% of the vote in the borough, compared with Democrat Barack Obama's 48%. In 2012, the borough flipped and was won by incumbent Democrat Barack Obama, who took 51% of the vote to Republican Mitt Romney's 48%. This made the borough one of the few parts of the country where Barack Obama gained ground compared to 2008. The Democratic Party's gains on the island in the 2010s proved ephemeral. In 2016, Republican Donald Trump carried Staten Island by 15.1%, the largest margin of any presidential candidate since 1988. With 56.1% of the island-wide vote, Trump became the first-ever presidential candidate to receive over 100,000 votes out of Staten Island. The borough stayed Republican on election day 2020, delivering 56.9% and a record of more than 123,000 votes to President Donald Trump. His margin expanded significantly in 2024 when he got 63.9% of the vote. Kamala Harris became the first Democrat to not get at least 40% of the vote since Bill Clinton in 1992. In all three elections, Staten Island was the only borough where Trump got at least 40 percent of the vote.

=== Federal representation ===
As of 2023, Staten Island lies entirely within New York's 11th congressional district, which also includes part of southwestern Brooklyn. Republican Nicole Malliotakis, who was elected in 2020, currently represents it. The 11th district had been represented by Democrat Max Rose, until Malliotakis defeated him 53% to 47%.

Party affiliation of Staten Island registered voters
Party	2005	2004	2003	2002	2001	2000	1999	1998	1997	1996
Democratic (%)	44.70	44.76	45.19	45.39	45.63	45.47	45.51	45.60	46.38	46.15
Republican (%)	30.64	30.47	30.77	30.55	30.68	30.76	31.17	31.60	30.80	31.28
No affiliation (%)	19.00	19.10	18.46	18.54	18.67	18.84	18.67	18.25	18.43	18.48
Other (%)	5.66	5.67	5.58	5.52	5.02	4.93	4.65	4.55	4.39	4.09

=== Local politics ===
Staten Island representation in the state assembly has one Democrat and three Republicans. The 62nd, 63rd, and 64th districts are represented by Republicans Michael Reilly, Sam Pirozzolo, and Michael Tannousis. The 61st district has an elected Democrat, Charles Fall. Staten Island is split between two state Senate districts. Most of the island used to be represented by Republican John J. Marchi, the longest-serving legislator in state history; but is now represented by Republican Andrew Lanza; while the North Shore belongs to the district of Democrat Jessica Scarcella-Spanton. In 2018, Matthew Titone, a Democrat who at the time was a member of the New York State Assembly for the 61st District, was elected Surrogate Judge for Richmond County, which covers all of Staten Island. He was succeeded by Charles Fall, also a Democrat, and the first African American elected to the Assembly from Staten Island.

Until 2009, Staten Island was included with Brooklyn in New York State's 2nd Judicial District. In that year, Staten Island secured Judicial Independence when a new law was signed, creating New York's 13th Judicial District. Since 2009, Staten Island voters have had the opportunity to elect 5 Justices to the New York State Supreme Court.

Each of the city's five counties (coterminous with each borough) has its own criminal court system and District Attorney, the chief public prosecutor who is directly elected by popular vote. Michael McMahon, a Conservative Democrat, is the current District Attorney.

Staten Island has three City Council members, the smallest number among the five boroughs. As of 2023, the island's city council delegation comprises two Republicans and one Democrat. The borough also has three administrative districts, each served by a local Community Board. Community Boards are representative bodies that field complaints and advocate for residents. In the 2009 election for city offices, Staten Island elected its first black official, Debi Rose, who defeated the incumbent Democrat in the North Shore city council seat in a primary and then went on to win the general election.

In New York City mayoral elections, Staten Island has traditionally been reliably Republican, having last voted Democratic for incumbent mayor Ed Koch in the 1985 election. Staten Island's high Republican turnout is considered one of the major factors that helped Rudy Giuliani win in 1993 against incumbent Democratic mayor David Dinkins, and also Michael Bloomberg in 2001 against Mark Green.

=== Secession from New York City ===
Secession from New York City has been a long-time controversial issue on Staten Island. The "Greater City" exists as a result of actions of the New York State Legislature, and, as such, could be reduced in size by the same mechanism. A non-binding referendum was held in 1993 to consider whether it should be allowed to secede from the city. The New York City government and Mayor David Dinkins opposed the vote, contending that the state should not permit the referendum unless the city issued a home rule message supporting it, which the city would not. Governor Mario Cuomo disagreed, and the vote went forward. Ultimately, 65% of Staten Island residents voted to secede through the approval of a new city charter making Staten Island an independent city, but implementation was blocked in the State Assembly.

The election of Rudy Giuliani as New York City mayor on the same ballot defused the Staten Island secession movement. He had campaigned on the promise that Staten Island's grievances would be addressed. Giuliani's plurality in his narrow victory over Dinkins was aided by overwhelming support from Staten Island. Two of the borough's biggest demands were closing the Fresh Kills Landfill and making the Staten Island Ferry free, both of which were done. However, after the election of Bill de Blasio as Mayor in 2013 and the success of the Brexit vote in the United Kingdom in 2016, interest in secession was revived. In 2019 and 2022, New York City councilman Joe Borelli announced his plan to introduce another set of bills to study the feasibility of secession.

== Tourism ==
In 2009, Borough President James Molinaro started a program to increase tourism on Staten Island. This program included a new website, a "Staten Island Attractions" video that is aired at both the Staten Island and Manhattan Whitehall ferry terminals, and informational kiosks at the terminals that provide printed information on Staten Island attractions, entertainment, and restaurants.

Empire Outlets New York City is a 350,000-square-foot (33,000 m^{2}) retail complex constructed in the St. George neighborhood of Staten Island. Empire Outlets features 100 designer outlets. It is the first outlet mall in New York City. The mall is located next to the St. George Terminal, a major ferry, train, and bus hub.

Staten Island is known as the borough of parks because of its numerous parks. Some well-known parks are Clove Lakes, Silver Lake, Greenbelt, and High Rock. Paulo's Peak (formerly Moses Mountain), a hill known for its view of the borough, was the site where Robert Moses wanted to build the Richmond Parkway before protests defeated the plan.It is now a key point of Staten Island for tourists.

== Culture ==
=== Local support for the arts ===
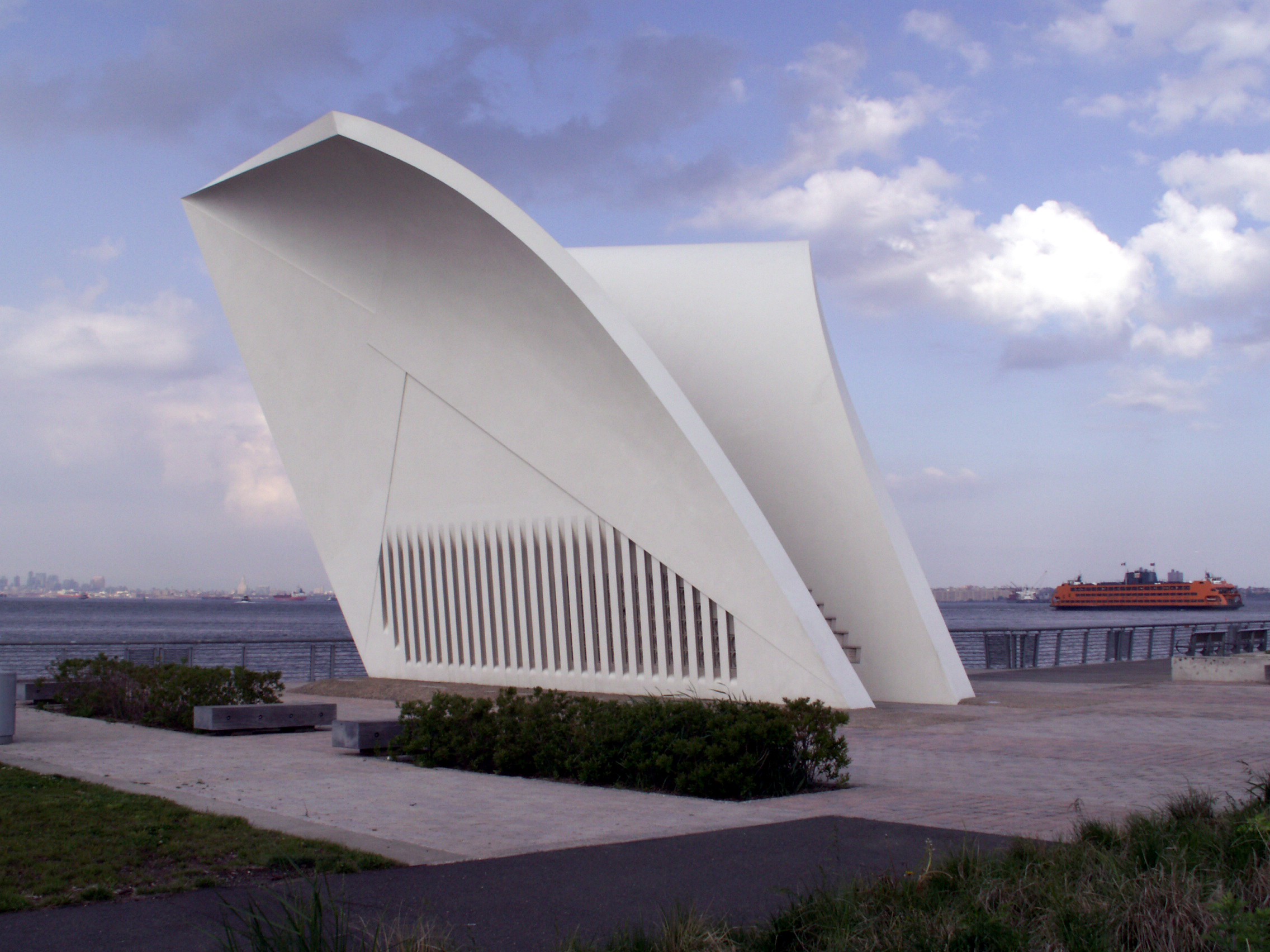
The "Postcards 9/11 Memorial" at St. George Esplanade

Artists and musicians have been moving to Staten Island's North Shore to be close to Manhattan while having affordable space to live and work. Filmmakers, most of whom work independently, also play an important part in Staten Island's art scene, which the local government has recognized. Staten Island Arts (formerly The Council on the Arts and Humanities for Staten Island) is Staten Island's local arts council and supports local artists and cultural organizations through regrants, workshops, folklife and arts-in-education programs, and advocacy. Conceived by the Staten Island Economic Development Corporation to introduce independent and international films to a broad and diverse audience, the Staten Island Film Festival (SIFF) held its first four-day festival in 2006.

=== Attractions ===
Historic Richmond Town is New York City's living history village and museum complex. Visitors can explore the diversity of the American experience, especially that of Staten Island and its neighboring communities, from the colonial period to the present. The village area occupies 25 acres (100,000 m^{2}) of a 100-acre (0.40 km^{2}) site with about 15 restored buildings, including homes, commercial and civic buildings, and a museum.

The island is home to the Staten Island Zoo. Zoo construction commenced in 1933 as part of the Federal Government's works program on an eight-acre (three-hectare) estate willed to New York City. It was opened on June 10, 1936, as the first zoo in the U.S. specifically devoted to an educational mandate. In the late 1960s, the zoo maintained the most complete rattlesnake collection in the world with 39 varieties.

==== Museums ====
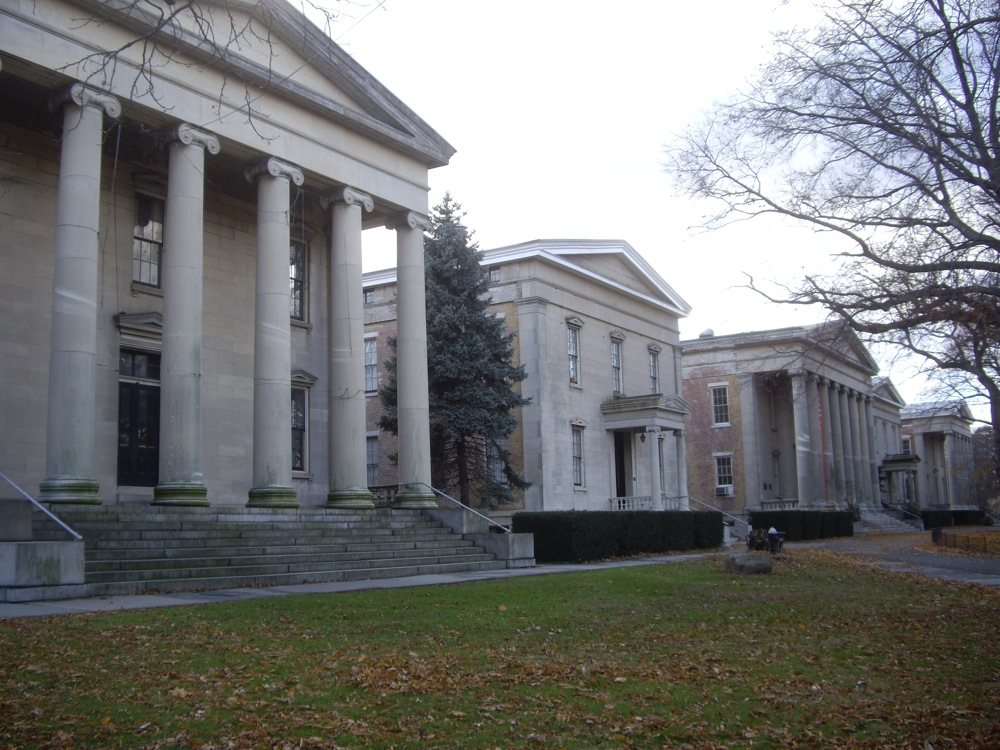
Sailors' Snug Harbor

Snug Harbor Cultural Center, the Alice Austen House Museum, the Conference House, the Garibaldi–Meucci Museum, Historic Richmond Town, Jacques Marchais Museum of Tibetan Art, the Noble Maritime Collection, Sandy Ground Historical Museum, Staten Island Children's Museum, the Sri Lankan Art & Cultural Museum of NY, the Staten Island Museum, and the Staten Island Botanical Garden, home of the New York Chinese Scholar's Garden, can all be found on the island.

The National Lighthouse Museum undertook a major fundraising project and opened an educational center at St. George in 2015. The Staten Island Museum (art, science, and history) opened a new branch in Snug Harbor in 2015.

The Seguine Mansion, also known as The Seguine-Burke Mansion, is located on Lemon Creek near the southern shore of Staten Island. The 19th-century Greek Revival house is listed on the National Register of Historic Places and is a member of the Historic House Trust; it is home to peacocks and an equestrian center.

=== Newspapers ===
Staten Island's local paper is The Staten Island Advance. The newspaper has an affiliated website called SILive.com.

=== In culture ===
==== Film ====
Movies filmed partially or wholly on Staten Island include:

- Analyze This
- The Astronaut's Wife
- Bad Hurt
- A Beautiful Mind
- Big Daddy
- Big Fan
- Combat Shock
- Cropsey
- The Devil's Own
- Donnie Brasco
- Easy Money
- Freedomland
- The First Purge
- Fur
- The Godfather
- Goodfellas
- Grace Quigley
- He Knows You're Alone
- How to Lose a Guy in 10 Days
- The Irishman
- The Jimmy Show
- Joe the King
- The Kindergarten Teacher
- The King of Staten Island
- Little Children
- Neighbors
- Nerve
- The Other Guys
- The Perils of Pauline (1914 serial)
- Scent of a Woman
- School of Rock
- Shamus
- Sisters
- Sleepwalk With Me
- Sorry, Wrong Number
- Splendor in the Grass
- Staten Island
- Staten Island Summer
- Strong Island
- Terrifier
- The Eltingville Club
- The Toxic Avenger
- Three Christs
- Trainwreck
- Two Family House
- War of the Worlds
- Wedding Daze
- What We Do in the Shadows (TV series)
- Who's That Knocking at My Door
- Working Girl
- Wu-Tang: An American Saga

==== Literature ====
Lydia Sigourney published her poem "Autumn on Staten Island" in her volume, Scenes in my Native Land, 1845. Her observations accompany it after a visit there in 1843.

World War One poet Alan Seeger, who fought with the French Foreign Legion and was killed in the Battle of the Somme, and author of "I Have a Rendezvous with Death" grew up at St. Marks Place above the ferry stop on Staten Island in the last decade of the 19th century. His poem "The Old Lowe House" described property that would become Low Terrace, St. George. Ki Longfellow was born on the island. Longfellow is the author of The Secret Magdalene and other books. Her Sam Russo historical detective noir novels are set in and around Stapleton.

Lois Lowry, the author of The Gossamer, The Giver, and many other books, attended school on Staten Island. Writer Paul Zindel lived in Staten Island during his youth and based most of his teenage novels on the island. George R. R. Martin based King's Landing on the view of Staten Island from his childhood home in Bayonne, New Jersey.

==== Music ====
Staten Island has a local music scene. These venues in the North Shore are part of the art movement mentioned above. Local bands include punk, ska, hardcore punk, indie, metal, and pop punk. Staten Island is known internationally for its hip-hop culture, exemplified by the critically acclaimed Wu-Tang Clan.

Musicians who were born on or live on Staten Island, and groups that formed there, are listed in the list of people from Staten Island.

==== Television ====
The Spectrum cable news channel NY1 airs a weekly show called This Week on Staten Island, hosted by Anthony Pascale. The magazine-style show takes content from NY1's hourly newscasts called "Your Staten Island News Now". A documentary series, A Walk Around Staten Island with David Hartman and Barry Lewis, premiered on public television station WNET on December 3, 2007. The hosts profile Staten Island culture and history, including major attractions such as the Staten Island Ferry, Historic Richmond Town, the Conference House, Snug Harbor Cultural Center, and its Chinese Scholars Garden, as well as many more sites.

The Fox and WB sitcom Grounded for Life (2001–2005) was centered on a family of Irish heritage living on Staten Island. All four cast members of truTV hidden camera reality TV show Impractical Jokers (2011–) hail from Staten Island. Joe Gatto, James "Murr" Murray, Brian "Q" Quinn, and Sal Vulcano are four friends who originally met while attending Monsignor Farrell High School, where they formed the improv comedy troupe The Tenderloins. Impractical Jokers features many references to Staten Island, and filming often takes place there. On February 6, 2023, the borough declared the first Monday of every February "Impractical Jokers Day" in honor of the show.

The FX comedy horror series What We Do in the Shadows (2019–2024) is centered on a group of vampires who live on Staten Island. The fact that they live on Staten Island and not more centrally in New York City is a common joke within the series. Their attempts to take over the entire borough have resulted in control of only five houses, according to the group.

==== Theater ====
The St. George Theatre serves as a cultural arts center, hosting educational programs, architectural tours, television and film shoots, concerts, comedy, Broadway touring companies, and small and large children's shows. Artists who have performed there include the B-52's, Jonas Brothers, Tony Bennett, and Don McLean. In 2012, the NBC musical drama Smash series filmed several scenes there.

The Ritz Theater in Port Richmond, a movie theater and vaudeville venue now a home-improvement showroom, once hosted the biggest names in rock and roll and show business. The theater was built by Isle Theatrical and opened in 1924. From 1970 to 1972, the theater had an arrangement with a Manhattan club that enabled them to bring top names, many of whom are now in the Rock and Roll Hall of Fame, to the location. The Stadium Theatre was a 1,037-seat movie theater in Tottenville from 1927 to 1957. In January 1969, it reopened as the New Stadium Theatre, a rock music venue, but by the 1970s, it had become the site of a roller rink.

The Lane Theater in New Dorp opened on February 10, 1938, and was operated by Charles, Lewis and Elias Moses. The theater's interior has been landmarked since November 1988. Starting in 1998, several concerts were hosted; and the theater briefly hosted "The EleMent" nightclub in 2001. After renovations were completed in summer 2009, Uncle Vinnie's Comedy Club opened there and operated until 2011. In 2012 the building became the home of the Crossroads Church.

== Sports ==
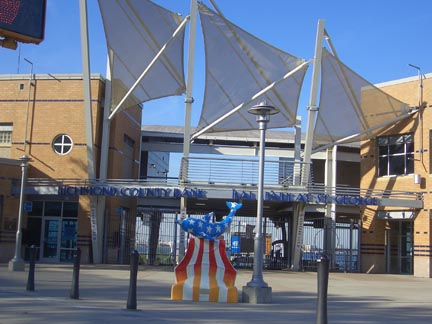
The Staten Island University Hospital Community Park

=== Baseball ===
The Staten Island Yankees played in the New York–Penn League from 1999 to 2020; the team was a Class-A Minor League affiliate of the New York Yankees before being eliminated during Minor League Baseball's restructuring. The Yankees have said they hope to help create a new team for Staten Island in the independent Atlantic League. Staten Island is now home to the Staten Island FerryHawks of the Atlantic League and playing their home games at Staten Island University Hospital ballpark.

The New York Metropolitans of the American Association played baseball on Staten Island from April 1886 through 1887. Erastus Wiman, the developer of St. George, brought the team to Staten Island at a stadium called the St. George Grounds, near the site of the present-day Staten Island FerryHawks' Staten Island University Hospital Community Park and the Staten Island Ferry terminal.

Staten Island's Mid-Island Little League won the 1964 Little League World Series in Williamsport, Pennsylvania. Three Mid-Island Little League teams and six overall from Staten Island have reached the tournament since it started in 1947. Staten Island Little League was the island's first Little League. Its "founding fathers"; Buddy Cusack, Jiggs Seaman, John Marino, Joe Darcy Sr., Joe "Babe" Darcy Jr., Ed Elliott, and Jim Darcy, built Hy Turkin Field (and additional fields) in Dongan Hills and have been inducted as a group into the Staten Island Sports Hall of Fame.

=== Basketball ===
In 2015, the New York Post listed Staten Island's all-time basketball team as: Warren Fenley, Kyle McAlarney, Bill Murtha, Kevin O'Connor, Kenny Page. As of 2014, McAlarney was Staten Island's all-time high-school boys' scoring leader with 2,566 points.

Some notable NBA players from Staten Island include Renaldo Balkman and Mouhamadou Gueye.

=== Bowling ===
Staten Island has been home to a number of national champions and world-class bowlers, including Mark Roth, Johnny Petraglia, Mary Ontek, Ben McNevich, Dom LaBargo, and Joseph Berardi. Roth, Petraglia and Berardi are in the Professional Bowlers Association (PBA) Hall of Fame.

=== Boxing ===
The Daily News Golden Gloves Tournament started in 1927. It is believed that Eppie Alonzo, who lived and trained at the Mount Loretto Home for Boys, is the first Staten Islander to win a Daily News Golden Gloves championship. Alonzo won his division in 1949 and again in 1950. Other Staten Islanders who have won a Daily News Golden Gloves championship include: Gabe Perillo Jr. (1974), Kevin Rooney (1975), Al Tobe (1975), Johnny Verderosa (1975, 1976), Gary Stark Jr. (2000, 2001, 2002), Amanda Walsh (2008), Nafisa Umarova (2012), Chad Trabuscio (2012), Anthony Caramanno (2008, 2010, 2012).

=== College athletics ===
The Wagner College Seahawks participates in NCAA Division I athletics and is a member of the Northeast Conference (NEC). National Basketball Association (NBA) coach P. J. Carlesimo coached the men's basketball team from 1976 to 1982. Terrance Bailey led NCAA Division I basketball in scoring as a junior in 1985–86. Rich Kotite, a former NFL player and coach, played tight end on Wagner's football team in the 1960s.

The College of Staten Island Dolphins participate in NCAA Division II athletics. The College of Staten Island Baseball Complex was the home of the Staten Island Yankees until 2001.

=== Cricket ===
The Staten Island Cricket Club, founded in 1872, is the oldest continuously operating cricket club in the United States.

=== Football ===
Staten Island had a National Football League (NFL) team, the Stapletons, also known as the Stapes. The team was based in Stapleton at Thompson Stadium, located on the current site of Berta A. Dreyfus Intermediate School 49 and the Stapleton Houses. They played in the league from 1929 to 1932, defeating the New York Giants twice and the Chicago Cardinals once. During the 1932 NFL season, the Stapletons, last in the NFL, played the eventual season champion Chicago Bears to a scoreless tie. Football Hall of Famer Ken Strong played for the Stapletons.

These NFL players were born on Staten Island: Joe Andruzzi (1998–2006), Frank Ferrara (2001–2003), James Jenkins (1991–2000), David Richards (1988–1996), Joseph Ryan (1960), Lewis Sanders (2000–2007), Mike Siani (1972–1980), Frank Umont (1944–1948, then MLB umpire 1954–1973). NFL coaches Kevin Coyle and Lou Anarumo were also born on Staten Island.

The New York Predators of the semi-pro Regional American Football League have called Staten Island home since their inception in 1998. Owned by Bill Simo, they play most home games at St. Peter's H.S.

=== Golf ===
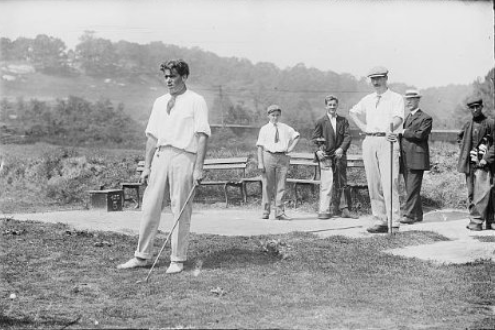
A 1905 golf match with Isaac Mackie (right) at Fox Hills Golf Club, Staten Island

Staten Island has four golf courses. La Tourette, Silver Lake, and South Shore are public, while Richmond County Country Club is the only private country club in New York City. The New York City Amateur is conducted annually at La Tourette Golf Course by the Staten Island Golf Association.

By some estimates, Staten Island has been home to nearly a dozen golf courses.

- Harbour Hills Golf Links near Brighton, Lafayette, and Prospect Avenue in New Brighton opened in 1878 and is said to have conducted the island's first golf tournaments. In 1898, the club opened a new clubhouse opposite the Brighton Heights Inn along Castleton Avenue. In 1904, the Brooklyn Daily Eagle Almanac reported that the club had 250 members and had been officially incorporated in 1896. Today, most of the property is known as Goodhue Park and Allison Pond Park.
- Clovena Club was in the vicinity of Clove Road and Victory Boulevard in 1897.
- Staten Island Cricket and Base Ball Club had a course in Livingston and was a Charter member of the Metropolitan Golf Association. Besides the "baseball" name, it was also known in journals of the time as the Staten Island Country Club and the Staten Island Cricket Club. As with other clubs making the transition from cricket to golf, the organization completed planning for what would become the Fox Hills Golf Course by identifying the 110-acre (45 ha) site and hiring an architect, but abandoned golf in 1899.
- Fox Hills Golf Course was one of the island's first true 18-hole courses. It opened in 1900 with over 200 members and had nearly 275 members by 1904. Fox Hills was semi-private, and attracted players from around the New York metropolitan area to its location in Clifton off Vanderbilt Avenue and Targee Street, where its clubhouse was one of the largest in the country. Prolific golf architect Tom Bendelow was selected to develop the course's original layout. Fox Hills's head professional, Scotsman Isaac Mackie, worked with Walter Travis in 1906 to revamp the golf course, and in 1928 Donald Ross made additional changes. Mackie played in at least 12 U.S. Opens from 1901 to 1921, and won the Eastern PGA Championship in 1908 at Fox Hills. From 1899 through 1926, the Staten Island Amateur was played annually at either Fox Hills or Richmond County Country Club. Like many private golf courses of that era, the Great Depression and the growing number of public courses contributed to the club's end, and Fox Hills closed in 1935.
- Tysen Manor Golf Course, which was located on 100-acre (40 ha) site between Hylan Boulevard, Mill Road, New Dorp Lane, and Tysens Lane, was in existence from 1928 until 1936. Henry H. Nutt operated the course. Tavern on the Green, a restaurant that closed in 1976, was originally the golf course's clubhouse, near the location of the current post office on Hylan Boulevard.
- Mayflower Country Club's golf course, designed by Devereux Emmet with Alfred H. Tull, was built on a 147-acre (59 ha) tract in Huguenot in 1928. The club had designs for sporting facilities that included an indoor swimming pool and tennis courts, but member funding dried up once the stock market crashed in 1929. Regardless, Frank B. Sterner & Co. built the country club's clubhouse for $200,000 in 1930, and the first annual club championship was conducted in September 1931. New York City took over the site in 1966 and opened South Shore Golf Course in 1967.
- Willowbrook State School Golf Course was a 9-hole layout on Forest Hill Road that opened in May 1945 and closed in the 1960s. The Metropolitan section of the Professional Golfers' Association of America (PGA) funded construction of the golf course at Halloran General Hospital in support of the U.S. Army and the war effort. Robert Trent Jones Sr. designed a layout that consisted of all par-3s on 23 acres (9.3 ha). Jones modeled the holes on what he thought were the great par-3s of the world, and the unique course opened with complimentary reviews.

Bill Britton, a tournament winner on the PGA Tour, and Jim Albus, a multiple winner on the PGA Tour Champions, learned the game on Staten Island. Both won the prestigious Metropolitan Open. Albus was the head professional at La Tourette and a winner of the Senior Players Championship. Carolyn Cudone, raised on Staten Island, won a record five straight U.S. Senior Women's Amateur championships between 1968 and 1972, the most wins in a row by an individual in any United States Golf Association (USGA) championship. Frank Esposito, who learned the game on Staten Island, won the 2014 PGA Tour Champions National Qualifying Tournament. Sean Kelly, a regular golfer at Silver Lake Golf Course, took medalist honors at both the First and Second Stage of the 2018 Web.com Tour Qualifying Tournament.

Frank Hannigan was the USGA Executive Director and a TV golf analyst for ABC. He wrote for the Staten Island Advance as a golf columnist and was influential in bringing the US Open to Shinnecock Hills and Bethpage State Park, and promoted the creation of the New York City Amateur. Staten Island native Joe Moresco was President of the Metropolitan section of the PGA in 1969 and 1970, was the Section's Professional of the Year in 1971 and is a member of the PGA Metropolitan Section Hall of Fame, along with Jim Albus.

=== Ice hockey ===
The New York Slapshots entered the Atlantic Coast Hockey League at the start of the 1985–86 season. They were supposed to play in the new 5,000-seat Phil Esposito Sports and Entertainment Center in Travis. However, the planned venue was never built, so the team had to play its "home" games elsewhere and relocated to Troy, New York the following season.

The following National Hockey League (NHL) players were born on Staten Island: Nick Fotiu, Kevin Labanc, Zach Aston-Reese, Joe Gambardella.

=== Motor sports ===
From 1953 until 1972, stock car races were held weekly from May until October at a 1/5th-mile asphalt racetrack on Staten Island. The local dairy, owned by the Weissglass family, financed promoter Gabe Rispoli with $700 so he could make improvements to an existing sporting facility that became known as Weissglass Stadium.

There was a controversial plan by the International Speedway Corporation (ISC) to build an 82,000-seat race track on the island that would host National Association for Stock Car Auto Racing (NASCAR) races by 2010. The ISC abandoned the plan in 2006, citing financial concerns, and sold the 676-acre (274 ha) parcel located in Bloomfield in 2013.

=== Olympians ===
These Staten Islanders have participated in the Olympic Games:

- John Henry Lake (1900: Cycling, Bronze medal winner)
- Abel Kiviat (1912: Athletics – 1500 Meters, Silver medal winner); World record holder
- Frankie Genaro (1920: Boxing – Flyweight, Gold medal winner)
- Carl Borack (1972: Fencing – Men's team foil)
- Marilyn King (1972: Athletics – Pentathlon; 1976: Athletics – Pentathlon; 1980: Athletics – Pentathlon)
- Bill Jankunis (1976: Athletics – High Jump)
- Ray Rudolph (1980: Handball)
- Dominick Minicucci (1988: Gymnastics; 1992: Gymnastics)
- Robert Pipkins (1992: Luge; 1994: Luge)
- Silvia Fontana (2002: Figure skating, 2006: Figure skating)
- Marcus Browne (2012: Boxing – Light Heavyweight)
- Gary di Silvestri (2014: Cross-Country Skiing – 15 kilometre classical)
- Robby Andrews (2016: Athletics – 1500 Meters)
- Krystal Lara (2020: Swimming – 100 metre backstroke; Swimming - 200 metre backstroke)
- Elmer Ripley, a member of the Basketball Hall of Fame and Staten Island native, coached the Olympic basketball teams for Israel (1956) and Canada (1960).

=== Running ===
The New York City Marathon is a foot race run over a 42.2 km (26.2 mi) course through the five boroughs of New York City. The marathon starts each year on Staten Island.

The Ocean Breeze Track and Field Athletic Complex is a state-of-the-art indoor track and field facility in Ocean Breeze Park that is part of the South Beach section of Staten Island. On November 19, 2015, the complex became the first facility in the United States to be recognized as a certified International Amateur Athletic Federation (IAAF) facility. A project under Mayor Bloomberg's Design Excellence initiative, the athletic complex was designed as part of the PlaNYC 110-acre Ocean Breeze regional park. The project, launched in 2007, encountered several delays, including a four-month setback due to Hurricane Sandy that exposed the vulnerability of generators, transformers, and electronic control rooms all of which had to be raised to avoid storm-surge flooding.

=== Swimming ===
In 1961, a lifeguard became the first person to swim around Staten Island. In 2023, Leslie Hamilton became the first woman to swim around Staten Island, which she did by swimming 37 miles (60 km) in 14.5 hours.

=== Tennis ===
Tennis is said to have made its United States debut on Staten Island. The first American National championship was played at the Staten Island Cricket and Baseball Club (now known as the Staten Island Cricket Club) in September 1880. Tennis was introduced in Staten Island by Mary Ewing Outerbridge.

Robert "Bob" Duffield Wrenn, a four-time U.S. singles championship winner and one of the first inductees in the International Tennis Hall of Fame, was a member of the Richmond County Country Club. His brother George Wrenn and friend Arthur E. Foote were also members.

== Education ==
=== Public schools ===
Non-charter public schools in the borough are managed by the New York City Department of Education, the largest public school system in the United States.

Public middle schools include Intermediate Schools 2, 7, 24, 27, 30, 34, 49, 51, 61, 72 and 75; and 861, a K–to–8 school; as well as part of the Petrides School (which runs from kindergarten through high school).

Public high schools include:

- College of Staten Island High School for International Studies
- Curtis High School
- Gaynor McCown Expeditionary Learning School
- New Dorp High School
- Petrides High School
- Port Richmond High School
- Ralph R. McKee CTE High School
- Staten Island Technical High School
- Susan E. Wagner High School
- Tottenville High School

=== Private schools ===
- Staten Island Academy is the only independent private (non-public, non-religious) grade school on the island and is one of the oldest in the country.

Nondenominational Christian

- Gateway Academy (co-educational)

Catholic

- Monsignor Farrell High School (all-boys)
- Moore Catholic High School (co-educational)
- Notre Dame Academy (New York) (all-girls)
- St. Joseph by the Sea High School (co-educational)
- St. Joseph Hill Academy (all-girls)
- St. Peter's Boys High School (all-boys)

Islamic

- Miraj Islamic School (co-educational)

Jewish

- Jewish Foundation School (co-educational)
- Mesivtha Tifereth Jerusalem, Staten Island campus (all-boys)
- Yeshiva Merkaz HaTorah (separate boys and girls)

=== Colleges and universities ===
- The College of Staten Island is one of the eleven senior colleges of the City University of New York (CUNY). The college offers associate's and bachelor's degrees, as well as master's and doctoral-level study.
- Wagner College is a co-educational private liberal arts college with an enrollment of 2,000 undergraduates and 500 graduate students.
- St. John's University had a campus on Grymes Hill from 1971 to 2024. Notre Dame College occupied the campus from 1933 until its merger with St. John's in 1971.

== Transportation ==
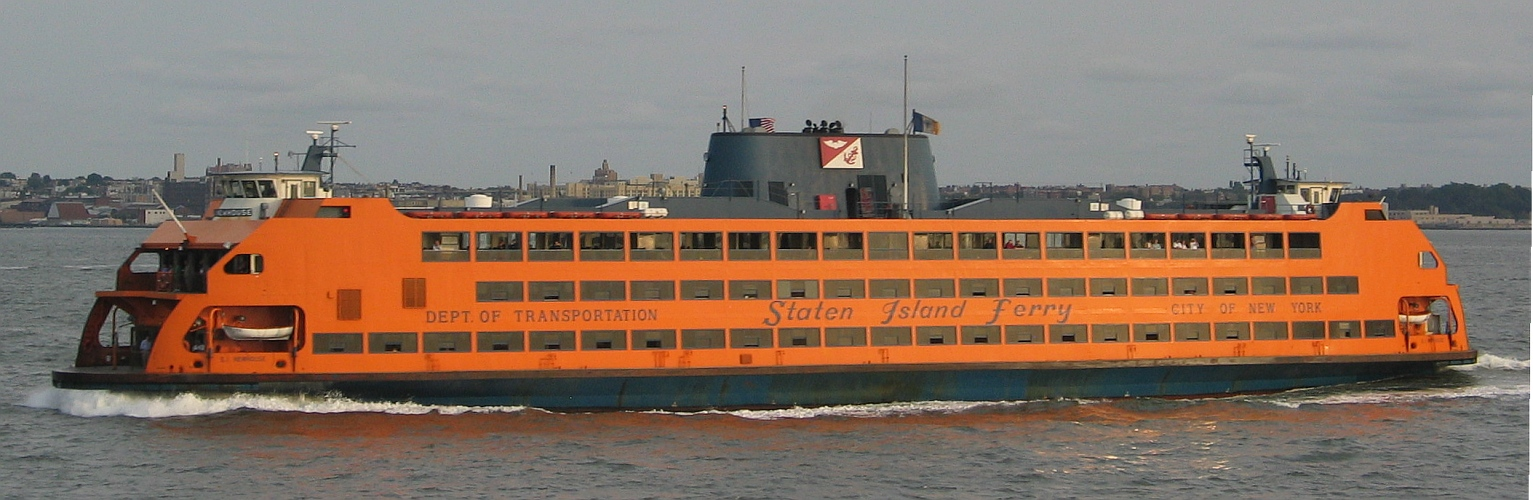
The Staten Island Ferry provides service from lower Manhattan to the St. George Terminal.

=== Bridges ===
Staten Island is connected to New Jersey via three vehicular bridges and one railroad bridge. The Outerbridge Crossing to Perth Amboy, New Jersey, is at the southern end of New York State Route 440, and the Bayonne Bridge to Bayonne, New Jersey is at the northern end of NY 440; both ends of NY 440 continue into New Jersey as Route 440. The Goethals Bridge, carrying Interstate 278, connects Elizabeth, New Jersey with the Staten Island Expressway. Just north of the Goethals, the Arthur Kill Vertical Lift Bridge carries freight between the northwest part of the island and Elizabeth, New Jersey. The Staten Island Expressway is connected to Brooklyn via the Verrazzano–Narrows Bridge, which carries I-278. Pedestrian links to Staten Island are available via a footpath on the Bayonne and Goethals Bridges.

From 1964 to 1977, Staten Island contained the longest vertical lift, steel arch, and suspension bridges in the world: the Arthur Kill Vertical Lift Bridge, Bayonne Bridge, and Verrazzano–Narrows Bridge, respectively. The Arthur Kill Bridge still holds the title for longest vertical lift bridge, while the Bayonne and Verrazzano bridges are now the 5th- and 14th-longest in their respective categories.

=== Roads ===
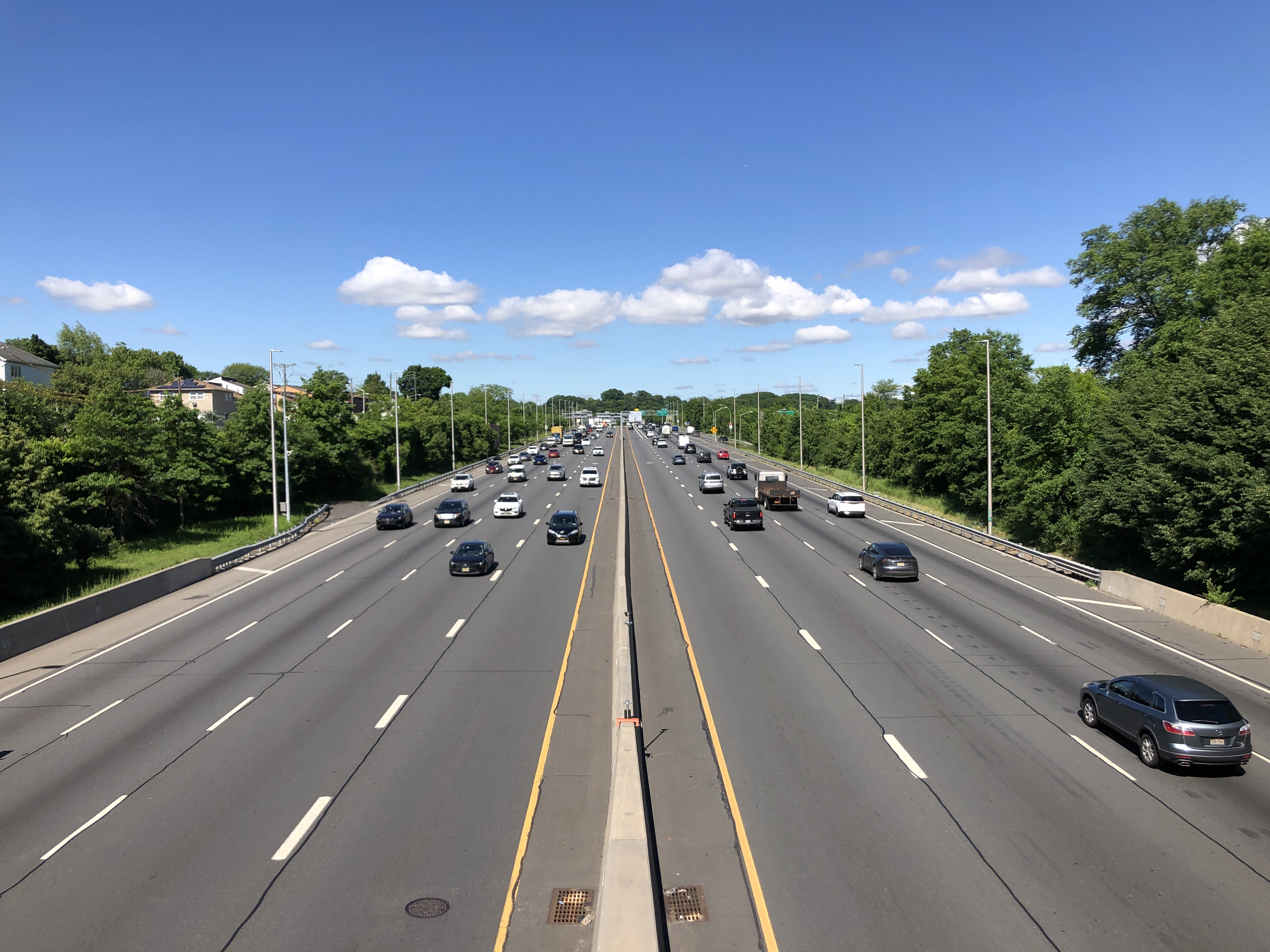
I-278 (Staten Island Expressway) westbound at Clove Road in Staten Island

As of 2015, 82% of Staten Island households owned a car, the highest rate of any borough. Citywide, the rate was 45%. Unlike the other four boroughs, Staten Island has no large, numbered grid system for its roads. New Dorp's grid has a few numbered streets, but they do not intersect with any numbered avenues. Some neighborhoods organize their street names alphabetically. In addition to the island's highways (I-278, NY 440, Korean War Veterans Parkway), the borough's neighborhoods are connected by several heavily trafficked roads including Hylan Boulevard, the longest street in New York City.

=== Public transit ===
As of 2021, public transportation on the island is limited to:

- New York City Department of Transportation (Staten Island Ferry)
- Hornblower Cruises (NYC Ferry – St. George route)
- Staten Island Railway service from St. George to Tottenville
- MTA Regional Bus Operations (local service on Staten Island, including some service to Brooklyn; and express service to Manhattan)

==== Ferry ====
The Staten Island Ferry is the only direct transportation from Staten Island to Manhattan, a roughly 25-minute trip. The St. George Terminal, first opened in 1886, was rebuilt in 1951 and again in the 2000s. The ferry has been fare-free since 1997. The Staten Island Ferry transports over 60,000 passengers per day. It runs 24/7 every 15 to 20 minutes during weekday rush hours and every 30 minutes at other times. The ferries and both of its terminals are patrolled by a combination of the New York City Department of Transportation, New York City Police Department, United States Coast Guard and private security contractors.

An NYC Ferry route has operated between St. George Terminal and Manhattan's West Side since August 2021, calling at Battery Park City/Vesey Street and terminating at Pier 79/Midtown West. This route is operated separately from the Staten Island Ferry and charges a fare.

==== Trains ====
The Staten Island Railway, currently the borough's only passenger railroad, traverses the island 24/7 from its northeastern tip to its southwestern tip. The Staten Island Railway opened in 1860 and was owned and operated by the Baltimore and Ohio Railroad (B&O) until July 1, 1971, when the line was bought by the Metropolitan Transportation Authority. The Staten Island Railway continued to have its own railway police, the Staten Island Rapid Transit Police, until 2005 when the 25-officer police force was consolidated into the Metropolitan Transportation Authority Police Department.

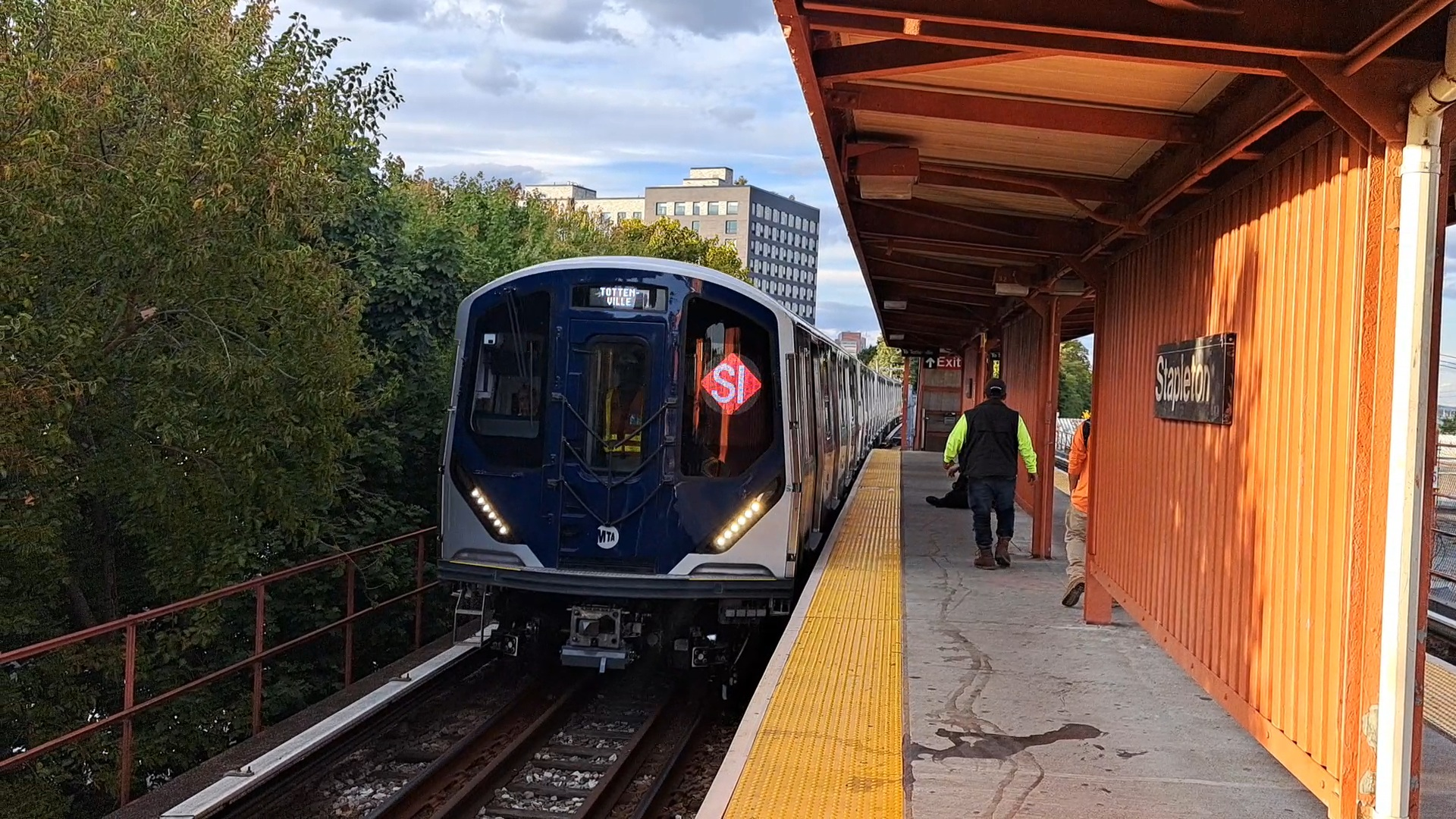
The Staten Island Railway operates along the Richmond/Amboy Roads corridor; this express train is bypassing Stapleton station.

Staten Island is the only borough not served by the New York City Subway. A subway tunnel called the Staten Island Tunnel started construction in 1923, but was abandoned two years later; the completed portion lies dormant beneath Owl's Head Park in Brooklyn. Today, express bus service is provided by NYC Transit throughout Staten Island to Lower Manhattan, Union Square, and Midtown Manhattan.

A 5-mile (8 km) right of way exists along the north shore of Staten Island. This North Shore Branch of the Staten Island Railway was built, owned, and operated by the B&O, which used it for passenger service until 1953. It then became a B&O freight line until the 1980s, when service was stopped. There have been proposals to revive the abandoned right-of-way for passenger service, either as a rail line or as bus rapid transit. There is also a proposal to build a West Shore Light Rail along New York State Route 440, running from the Staten Island Railway main line on the South Shore, to the Hudson–Bergen Light Rail in Bayonne, New Jersey. The South Beach Branch of the Staten Island Railway, which transported summer vacationers to South Beach, Staten Island, also ceased service in 1953.

==== Buses ====
MTA Regional Bus Operations provides local and limited bus service with over 30 lines throughout Staten Island. Most lines feed into the St. George Terminal in the northeastern corner of the borough. Three lines (the S53, S93 and S79 SBS) provide service over the Verrazzano Bridge to Bay Ridge, Brooklyn. The S79 SBS is the only Select Bus Service route in the borough. Beginning September 4, 2007, the MTA began offering bus service from Staten Island to Bayonne, New Jersey, over the Bayonne Bridge via the S89 limited-stop bus, allowing passengers to connect to the Hudson–Bergen Light Rail's 34th Street station, giving Staten Island residents a new route into Manhattan. Despite Staten Island's proximity to New Jersey, the S89 is the only public transportation route directly into New Jersey from Staten Island.

Express bus service to Manhattan (via the Verrazzano Bridge or Goethals Bridge) is also available for a $7.00 fare each way. The SIM1C, SIM3C, SIM4C and SIM33C are the only express routes to run outside of weekday commuter hours.

=== Freight rail ===
Conrail Shared Assets Operations operates freight rail service for customers of CSX Transportation and the Norfolk Southern Railway via the Travis Branch, with a 38-acre (15 ha) intermodal on-dock rail facility on the West Shore of Staten Island, which connects to the National Rail System via the Arthur Kill Rail Bridge to New Jersey. In addition to the intermodal on-dock rail yard, the Conrail Staten Island Rail line also connects to the Sanitation Department's waste transfer station. Conrail railroad police officers patrol and respond to emergencies along the freight line.

== Infrastructure ==
=== Hospitals ===
Staten Island is the only borough without a hospital operated by New York City. The Richmond University Medical Center and the Staten Island University Hospital are privately operated.

=== Jails ===
Staten Island is the only borough without a major detention center operated by the New York City Department of Correction. The Department of Corrections only maintains court holding jails at the three court buildings on Staten Island for inmates attending court. The various police agencies on Staten Island maintain in-house holding jails for post-arrest detention before transfer to a correctional jail in another borough.

The Staten Island County Sheriff operated a jail system on Staten Island until 1942, when it was transferred from the County Sheriff's Department to the New York City Department of Corrections and eventually closed. In 1976, the New York State Department of Correctional Services opened the Arthur Kill Correctional Facility of Staten Island, but the facility was closed in 2011.

== Nicknames ==
Staten Island has acquired several nicknames over the decades, some tied to the perception that it is an afterthought among other New York City residents. The "Forgotten Borough" was first used nearly 100 years ago in a New York Times article that quoted a real estate executive. The phrase was more used during the secession movement of the 1990s, and came into greater use in the aftermath of Hurricane Sandy.

The island has also been referred to as the "borough of parks" due to its vast swaths of protected parkland and green spaces. The island has 12,300 acres of protected parkland and over 170 parks. The hip-hop group Wu-Tang Clan, which originates from Staten Island, coined the nickname "Shaolin Land" (later simply Shaolin) for Staten Island as part of their slang. Some have also taken to calling the island "The Rock", a moniker more commonly associated with Alcatraz, with this nickname's first appearance in print being a New York Times article in 2007.

== International relations ==
Staten Island is twinned with Ulcinj, Montenegro.

== See also ==
- 2024 United States drone sightings
- List of people from Staten Island
- List of counties in New York
- List of Staten Island neighborhoods
- National Register of Historic Places listings in Staten Island
- Staten Island Legal Services
- Staten Island Pavilion
- Staten Island Economic Development Corporation
- List of tallest buildings in Staten Island
