= Selective door operation =

Train technology

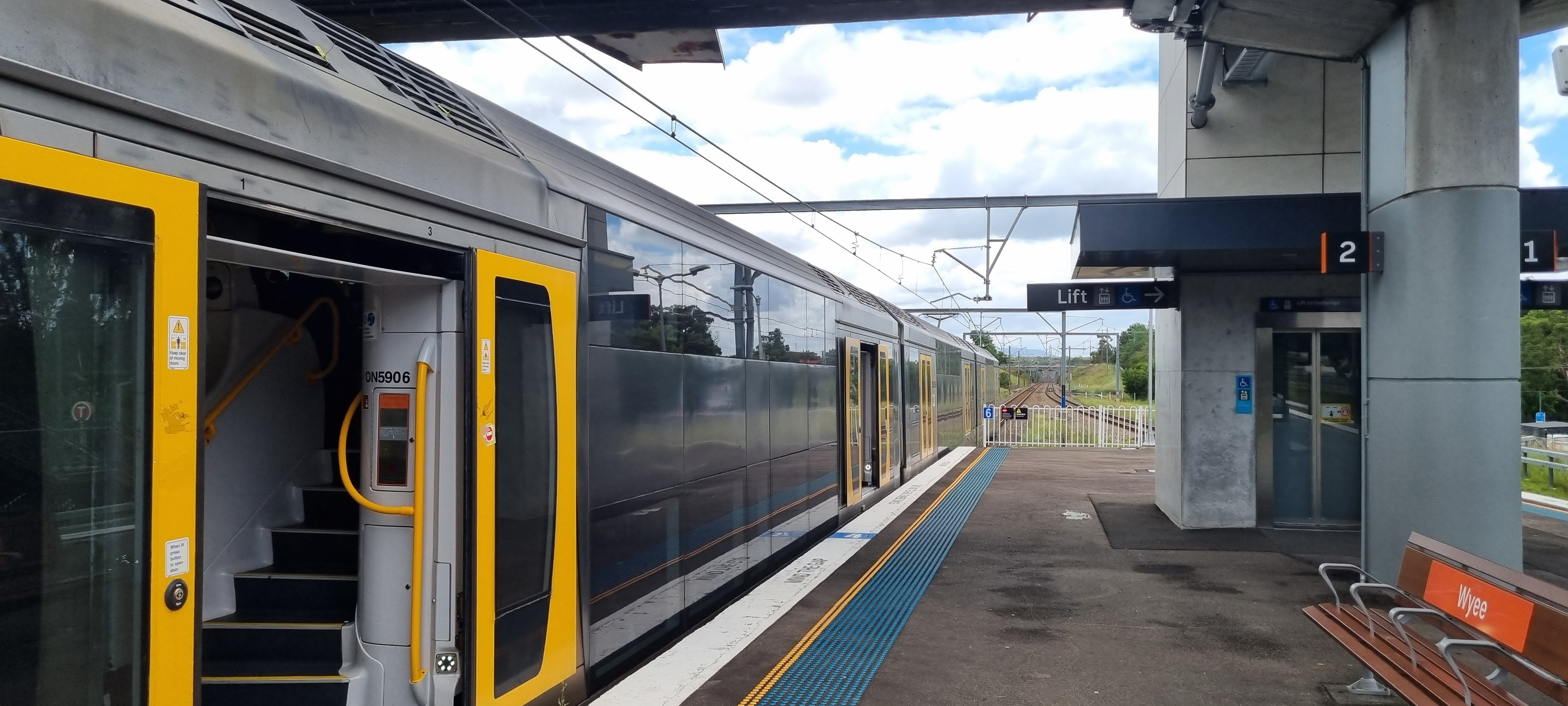
Example of selective door operation. The doors in the first 2 carriages are not opened, because the platform is too short for an 8-carriage OSCAR train.

Selective door operation (SDO), also known as selective door opening, is a mechanism employed primarily on trains (although buses with multiple doors also generally have this feature) that allows the driver or conductor/guard to open the doors of a train separately.

Selective Door Operation enables trains to call at a station where the platform is shorter than the train. Some doors can be prevented from opening to ensure that passengers do not disembark from any carriages not standing at the platform. The term Selective Door Operation is used mainly in the United Kingdom; some train operating companies used the term ‘Door De-Select’. A version of this is used in other countries and on other rail systems such as the London Underground.

== UK variations ==
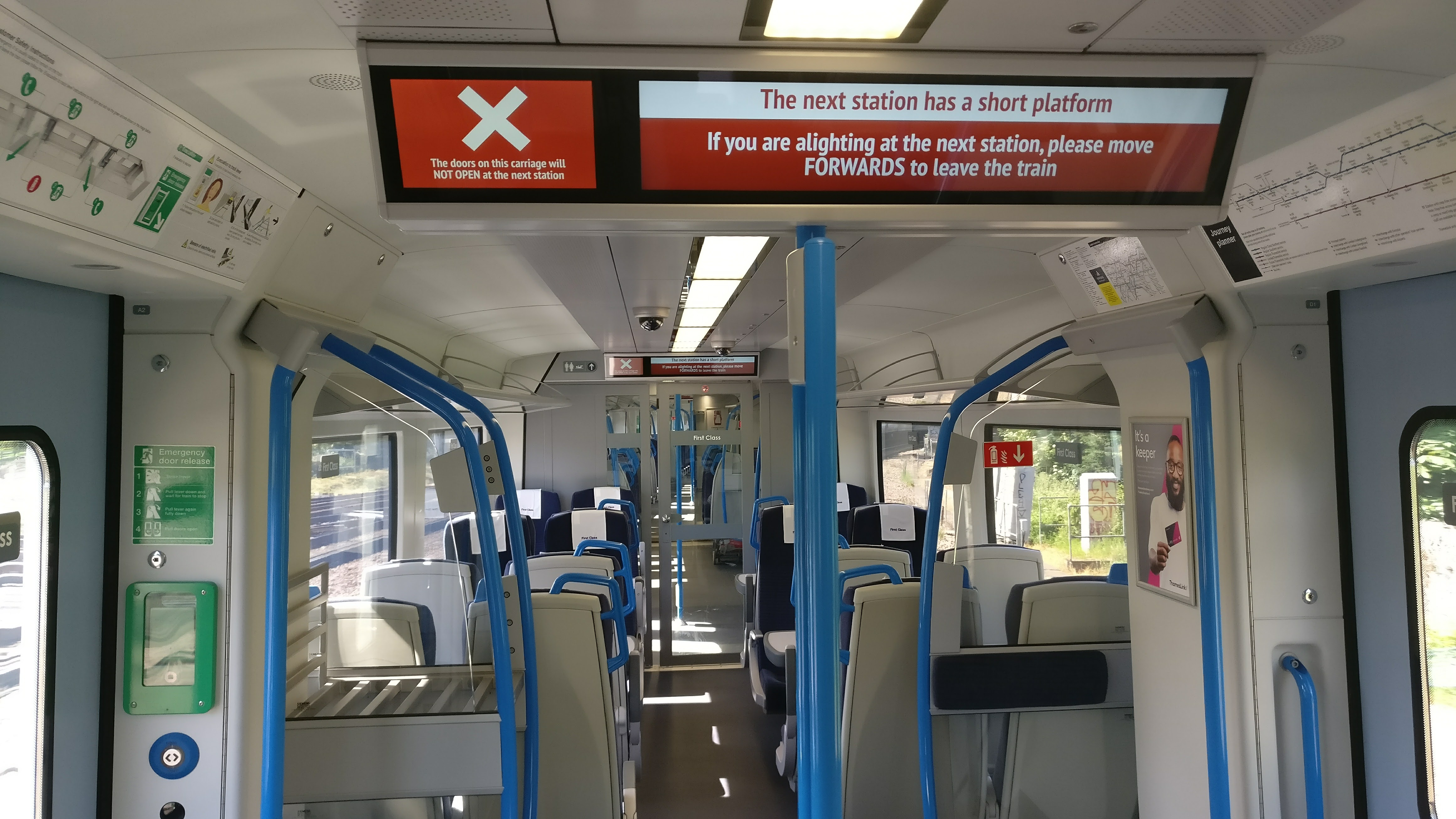
A message shown inside a Class 700 train on approach to a station with short platforms

In the UK various trains, either multiple units or coaches, have variations of the selective door operating system. This usually depends on what the specific train operating company and/or train leasing company required, either at time of purchase or a later modification to an existing train to keep up to date with regulations. Examples of these variations are as follows:

- Most Class 170 Turbostar units, with certain exceptions like the 170 Mark 1, are fitted with SDO. This when operated de-selects all carriages behind the carriage in which the train doors are being operated, so the guard can operate the SDO, allowing any length of train to occupy the platform as long as it can take one carriage.
- Former Midland Mainline Class 170 'Mark 1' Turbostar units are fitted with SDO. This form of SDO was operated by the driver, who would run the leading carriage off the platform and deactivate the doors in the leading cab before releasing. These units are currently in use with CrossCountry, without any need for this form of SDO.
- Class 172 units have an SDO feature fitted to them, working in a similar same way to the Class 170. The system on 172 defaults to SDO (unlike the 170) and requires the Guard to deactivate before releasing all the doors. This includes the units London Overground formerly operated on the Gospel Oak Branch, although Driver Only is now in operation on the entire London Overground network.
- Class 350 Desiro electric multiple units use a system call Unit De-Select. This allows the guard of the train to de-select an entire unit on a train while they are in working in multiple from one of the driving cabs, meaning that an 8 coach 350 set for example, made up of two units (each unit has 4 coaches), can have one set de-selected.
- Since 2015, Class 444 and 450 Desiro electric multiple units have used a system called Automatic Selective Door Operation. As the train approaches a platform, a beacon between the rails communicates with the train's on board computer, which tells it the number of coaches to release doors on. If for any reason the computer does not receive a signal, it will release only the front 4 coaches - the length of the shortest platform served by South Western Railway, the operator of the Class 444 and 450s.
- Great Western Railway High Speed Train sets have SDO at almost all door locations. These trains are of the slam-door variety and fitted with the central door locking system. The guard operates the SDO system from most door control panels throughout the train. The guard can then either de-select doors in front of that location or behind.
- Class 180 units are fitted with SDO, this is operated by the driver (who also releases the doors) from a switch in the leading cab.
- Most Electrostars (Bombardier built) Class 375, 377, 378, 379 and 387 have SDO systems fitted and operate in the southeastern region of the country. A Global Positioning System (GPS) receiver located on the train passes location data to the MITRAC Train Control Management System, which uses its database of platform lengths to determine how many doors will be released when the driver presses the 'door open' buttons at a station. The Class 387s in use on the Govia Thameslink routes have an additional Tracklink II system to augment the GPS. The Tracklink II system consists of a balise fitted at short platform stations which sends data to the approaching train showing which station it is approaching, and the length of the platform that it is entering. The Tracklink II system is necessary because GPS is not accurate enough to differentiate between platforms at a multi-platform station.
- All Class 195 and Class 331 CAF Civity trains have ASDO systems fitted, the vast majority of services will operate as 3 and 4-car formations (doubled 2-car for the Class 195), some 3-car units will be doubled for 6-car services. ASDO is fitted on routes where platform lengths cannot fully accommodate the train. The ASDO system is linked to an automated system which informs passengers through announcements and the passenger information screens located in each saloon.
- On Class 373 trains, manually locked selective door opening was used at shorter platforms when sets ran with GNER on their "White Rose" services between London King's Cross, York and Leeds.

== International variations ==
Selective door operation is implemented at certain railway stations in the United States. In the New York City Subway, the 6 1/2-car-long platforms at 145th Street (and formerly the 5-car-long loop platforms at South Ferry) are too short to accommodate full-length trains of ten 51.4-foot-long (15.7 m) cars, so only the first five cars of the train opened their doors at these stations. Also at South Ferry, the inner platform's curves were so tight that only the inner doors of the cars were able to be opened. At Times Square on track 4 of the 42nd Street Shuttle, the original platform was so short that only the first door of the third car was allowed to open at the station. After a reconfiguration of the shuttle in 2021, it is now possible for an entire train to fit on track 4.

On the Staten Island Railway, the Richmond Valley station only allows for the first three cars to open, due to the short platforms which cannot fit four 75-foot-long (23 m) cars. In addition, the last car for St. George-bound trains do not open at Clifton, due to the wide space from trains caused by the platform's curvature. Before they were demolished in 2017, the Atlantic and Nassau stations only allowed the last car of a train to open its doors at the platforms.

In Boston, the boarding platform at the Bowdoin terminus of the MBTA Blue Line accommodates only four of the train's six cars; passengers must press buttons to open the doors. Similar selective door operation protocols are used on many commuter rail lines within the Northeast megalopolis since some commuter rail stations have platforms that are too short to accommodate longer trains.

In Seattle, the Satellite Transit System at Seattle-Tacoma International Airport uses selective door operation on the loop connecting the South Satellite (the airport's international concourse) with the airport's main terminal. Passengers on most international flights arrive at the South Satellite, where they are inspected by U.S. Customs and Border Protection officials; after clearing inspection, passengers have the option of waiting in line to be inspected by the Transportation Security Administration so that they may access the rear two cars and secure area of the airport (to catch a connecting flight) or directly boarding the first train car which transports them to the airport exit and the baggage claim area. The platform screen doors that provide access to the first car of the train do not open at the station serving Concourse B of the airport to prevent unscreened passengers from accessing the concourse.

In many NSW TrainLink stations in New South Wales, Australia, due to shorter platform length than trains, only selected doors will open. One example would be Wondabyne railway station or Zig Zag railway station, where the extremely short length of platform only allows rear door (next to crew cab) on the last carriage to be opened.

In New Zealand, “selective door opening” is used on the Wairarapa Connection commuter train, as the Maymorn railway station platform is not long enough to accommodate all the carriages, and Maymorn passengers are restricted to the first three carriages.

== Limitations ==
Most modern Selective Door Opening (SDO) systems receive their positioning data from the Global Positioning System (GPS). As the train arrives at a station, the GPS determines the location for the train's SDO control, which contains a database with a Unique Location Identifier (ULI) for each station. This then enables the correct number of coaches to be opened to suit the length of the platform. However this system is reliant on the train stopping in the correct position, since the SDO will authorise the doors to open as long as the train is within 300 metres of the station. Depending on which system is in use, SDO may not prevent the doors from being opened where there is no platform if;

- The train stops beyond the appropriate stop mark and the driver releases the doors
- The train stops before the appropriate stop mark and the driver releases the doors
- The driver releases the doors on the wrong side of the train

== Local door operation ==
Selective Door Operation is different from Local Door Operation (LDO), which is used on many trains by train crew and other staff. It is where a single door on a train is operated by its train crew from a crew operated switch, often on a train door control panel operated by the train's guard. This differs from the Emergency Door Release or Egress that can be used by the general public in case of an emergency, this usually requires a cover to be removed or broken to operate and would never usually be used in the normal course of a journey.
