= Richmond County Bank Ballpark station =

Staten Island Railway station (2001–10)

BallPark
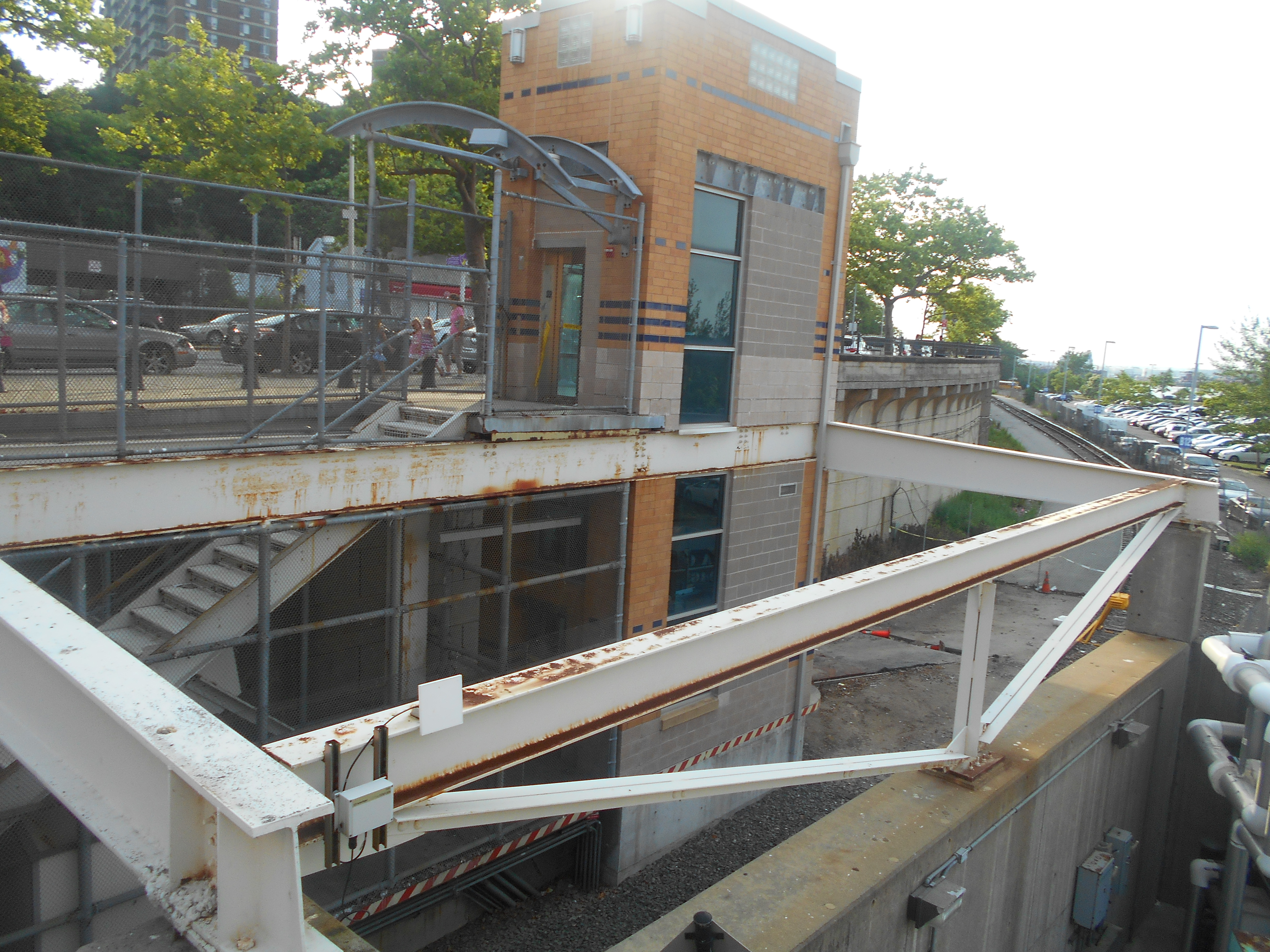

General information
- Location: Wall Street & Richmond Terrace; St. George, Staten Island
- Coordinates: 40.6452°N 74.0773°W
- Line: SIR North Shore Line
- Platforms: 1 island platform
- Tracks: 1

Construction
- Structure type: At-grade
- Accessible: Yes

Other information
- Status: Closed

History
- Opened: June 24, 2001; 25 years ago
- Closed: June 18, 2010; 16 years ago

Former services
Preceding station	Staten Island Railway	Following station
Terminus	Staten Island Railway	St. George toward Tottenville
Track layout
Location

Richmond County Bank Ballpark station (styled BallPark on station signage) is a disused station on the Staten Island Railway (SIR), located at Wall Street and Richmond Terrace in St. George.

The station closed in 2010 amid systemwide service reductions associated with the financial impact of the Great Recession on the MTA, which faced a budget deficit exceeding $1 billion.

The station remains intact, with signage and platform infrastructure still in place. Since its closure, passengers traveling to the nearby ballpark and surrounding areas have used St. George Terminal, the northern terminus of the line, requiring additional walking distance.

The station was constructed with accessibility features, and its closure reduced direct access to the SIR for nearby areas.

== History ==
The station first opened on June 24, 2001 in conjunction with the Staten Island Yankees baseball season, serving the team's new SIUH Community Park on game days only. It was the newest station on the railway until the opening of Arthur Kill station on January 21, 2017. This station was only operational during the baseball season, which usually ran from June to September. One train was scheduled to travel to/from Tottenville, with two or three shuttle trains from St. George serving the station. Due to a budget crisis suffered by the Metropolitan Transportation Authority, this station closed on June 18, 2010, due to the Great Recession, which occurred from 2007 to 2009, the date of the first scheduled home game of the season. As a result, a short walk from St. George, or traveling on the S40 or S44 buses, is required to reach the stadium. Trains last served the station in September 2009. The station is still used by employees to reach locomotives that are now stored on the only track at this station.

== Station layout ==
G	-	Street level
P Platform level	Northern trackway	Trackbed
P Platform level	Island platform, not in service
P Platform level	Southern track	No passenger service (No service: Tompkinsville or St. George)

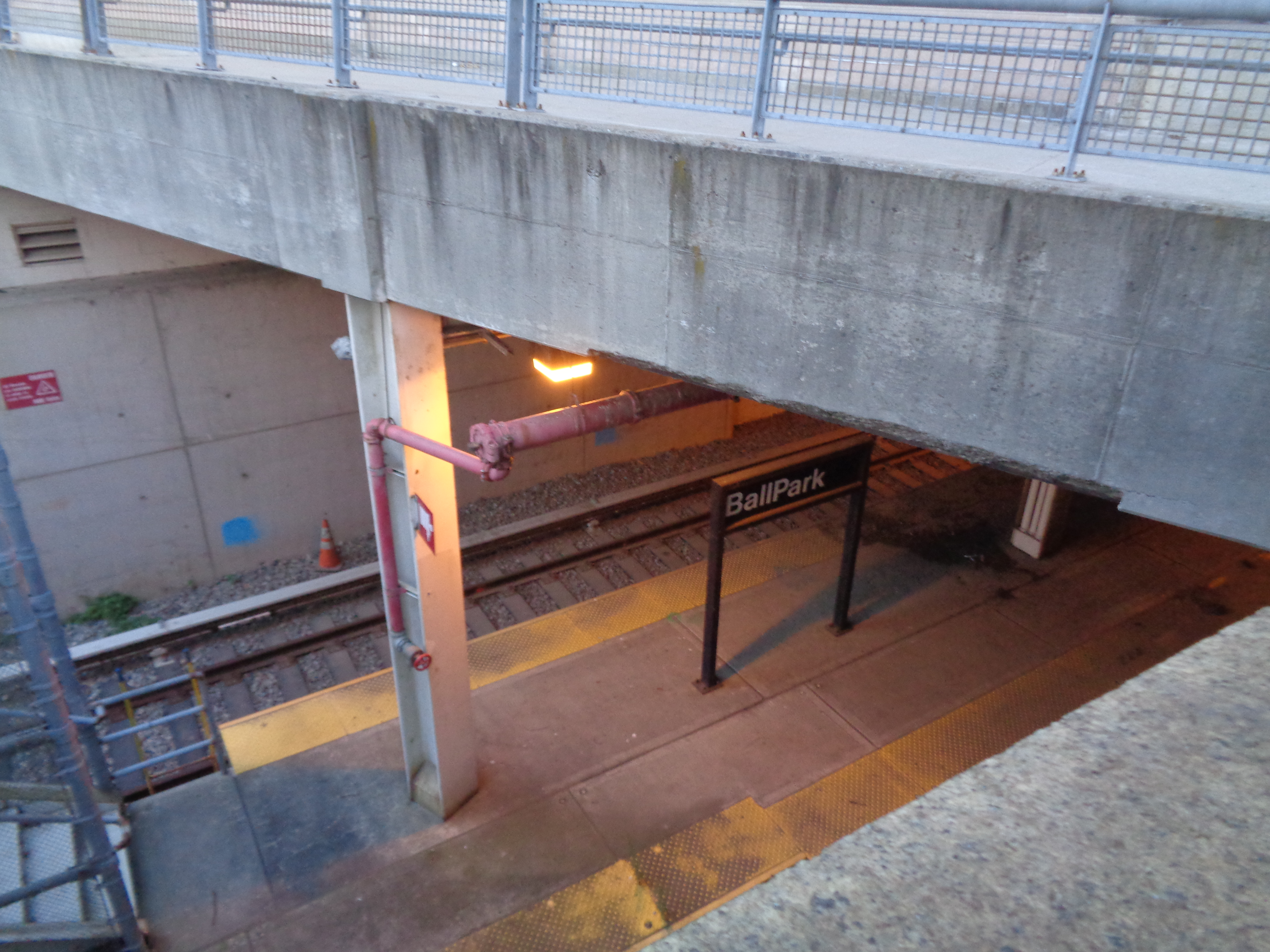
Looking down at the station in 2017

The station is located underneath the stadium below the northern sidewalk of Richmond Terrace between Wall Street and Hamilton Avenue. It is about 150 yards (140 m) west of Saint George Terminal along what used to be the former North Shore Branch Line, which is not considered part of the main line of the railway. It consists of an island platform, with a double wide staircase to Wall Street at the east end and ADA elevator to Hamilton Avenue at the west end.

There are no turnstiles at this station. It is served by a one-track wye which extends from St. George to the southern (geographically eastern) trackway of the station's island platform. Bumper blocks are present at the end of the station, though the wye continues to the end of the ballpark parking lot where it ends at a second set of bumper blocks. This section originally was electrified but is no longer powered. After the abandonment of the station, the sole track is used to store locomotives. The northern trackway currently has no track and is unused.
