= Richmond Valley =

Richmond Valley may refer to:

- Richmond Valley Council, New South Wales, Australia
- Richmond Valley, Staten Island, New York
  - Richmond Valley (Staten Island Railway station)
