= Nassau station =

Former railway station on Staten Island, New York

Nassau
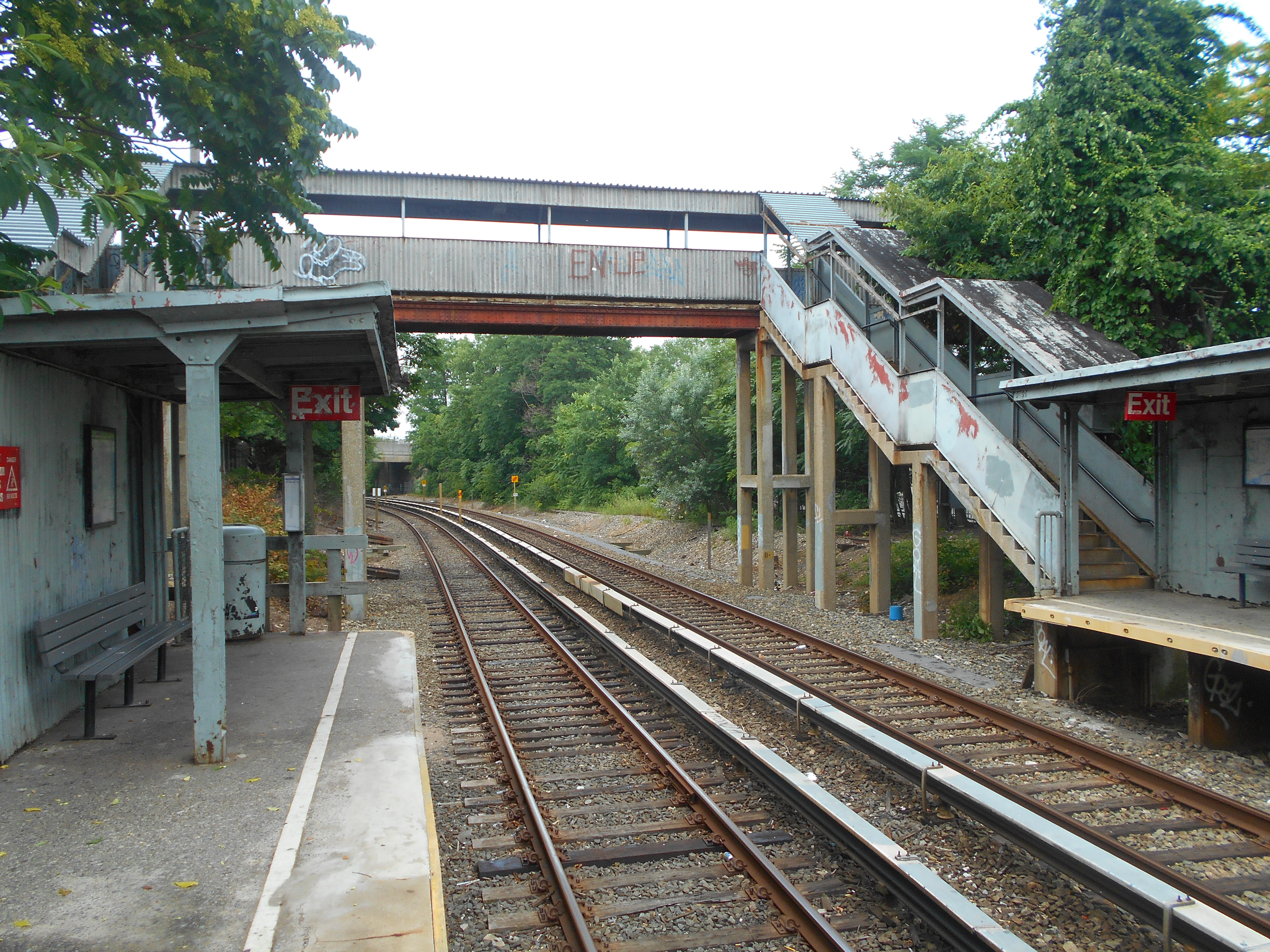
- Nassau station from the St. George-bound platform in July 2014

General information
- Location: Saint Andrews Place and Bethel Avenue; Tottenville; Charleston, Staten Island
- Coordinates: 40.5178°N 74.2384°W
- Platforms: 2 side platforms
- Tracks: 2

Construction
- Structure type: At-grade

Other information
- Station code: 520

History
- Opened: after 1924 (Note: Nassau did not appear in a SIRT timetable from 1921 according to A map from 1922 also did not list the station. A map from May 25, 1924 also doesn't show the station.)
- Closed: January 21, 2017

Former services
Preceding station	Staten Island Railway	Following station
Richmond Valley toward St. George	Staten Island Railway	Atlantic toward Tottenville
Track layout
Location

The Nassau station was a Staten Island Railway station located roughly between the neighborhoods of Tottenville (to the south) and Charleston (to the north), in Staten Island, New York. The station was built sometime after 1924 in order to serve the Nassau Smelting & Refining Company, and had a siding so that freight could be transferred to and from the factory. The station platforms were extended in 1971 as part of the modernization of the rail line. However, the condition of the station deteriorated after the 1990s, and this station, along with the Atlantic station to the south, were replaced by a new station at Arthur Kill Road. When that station opened in January 2017, Nassau station closed. The station was subsequently demolished.

== History ==
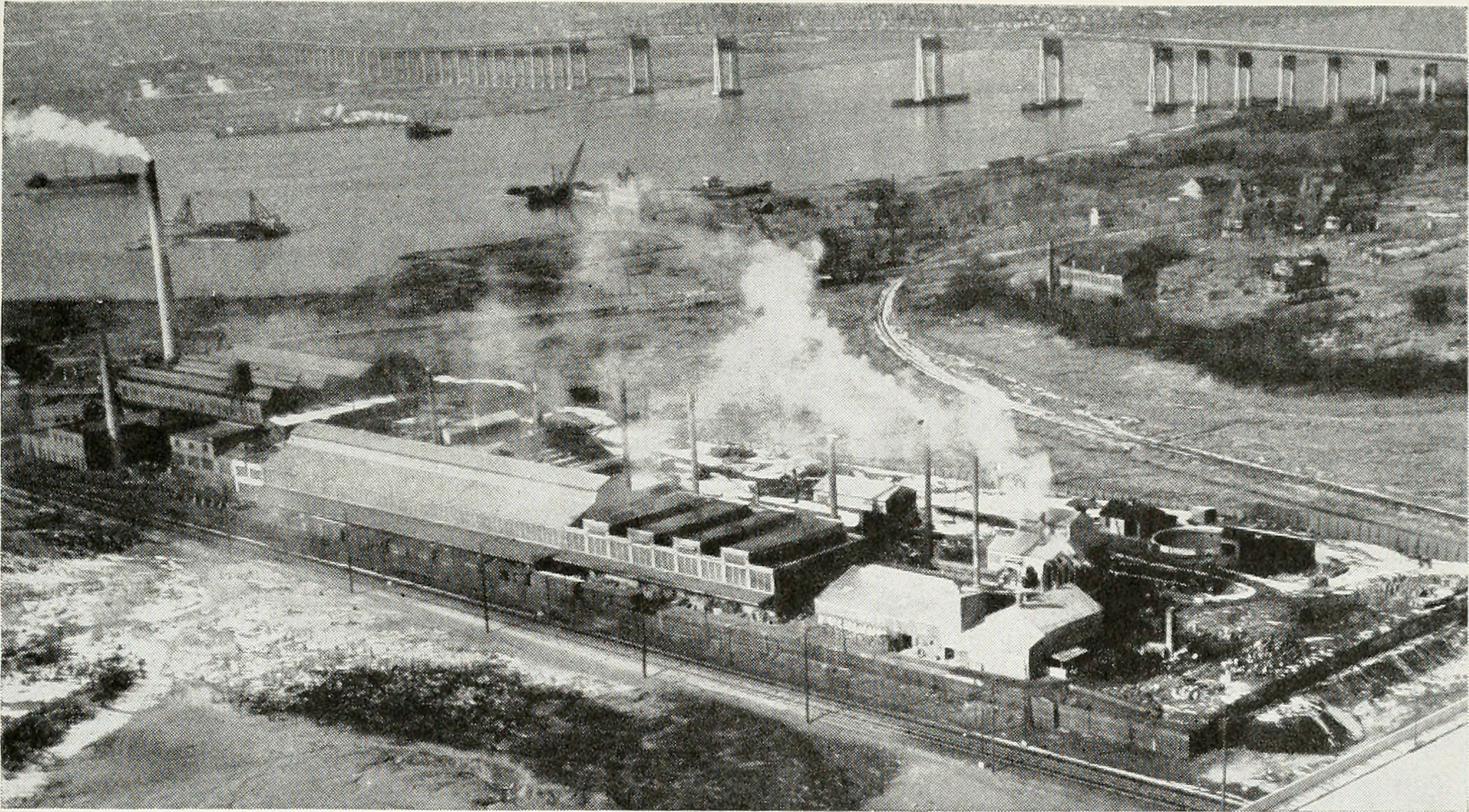
The Nassau Smelting and Refining Company in Tottenville in 1922.

Nassau station opened sometime after 1924, over sixty years after the 1860 opening of the Staten Island Railway from Annadale to Tottenville. The station was named after and built to serve the nearby Nassau Smelting & Refining Company, which was located directly to the west of the southbound platform. The station allowed workers of the company easy transportation access while also providing freight service to the company via a rail siding located to the west of the southbound platform. The factory opened in 1882 as the Tottenville Copper Works and changed its name in 1931 to the Nassau Smelting & Refining Company. As a subsidiary of Bell Telephone System's Western Electric division, the factory recycled obsolete telephone equipment and manufactured copper wire and solder. It would later be called AT&T Nassau Metals. For more than 20 years, the site was a vacant brownfield, until the land was cleaned up in 2007 and became environmentally safe for future development.

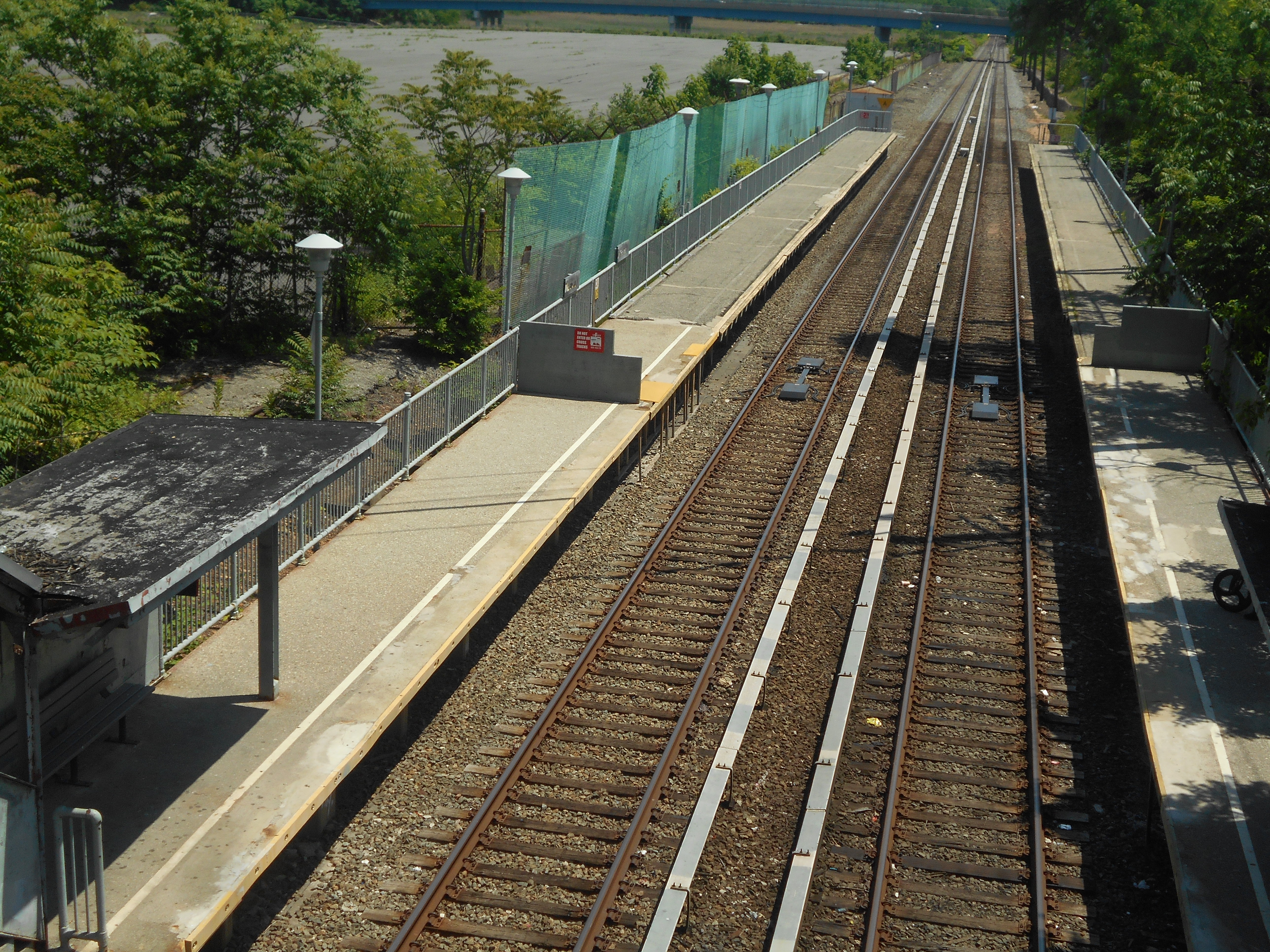
View of the station from the overpass, showing the closed portions of the platforms prior to their demolition

The Metropolitan Transportation Authority purchased and gained control of the Staten Island Rapid Transit in 1971, and started to modernize the rail line. In 1971, the station platforms were extended to 300 feet (91 m) as part of the improvements program. The extensions were funded in part by the Nassau Smelting Plant. The station extension was built on timber covered with asphalt, and was located to the east of the original platforms. The stations on the line were modernized again in the 1990s, with the exception of Nassau, and the nearby Atlantic station, which also was built to serve a factory. Instead, these two stations were set to be replaced with a station in between the two at Arthur Kill Road. However, the funds required for the construction of the project were not available, pushing back the construction of the project to 2013. In the meantime, with the lack of maintenance, the platform extension deteriorated, forcing the MTA to close the platform extensions on September 2, 2010. Construction on the replacement Arthur Kill station commenced in October 2013, and after several delays was opened on January 21, 2017. Once the new station opened, Nassau closed, and in May 2017, it was demolished. The station was used by approximately 350 daily passengers prior to its closure.

== Station layout ==
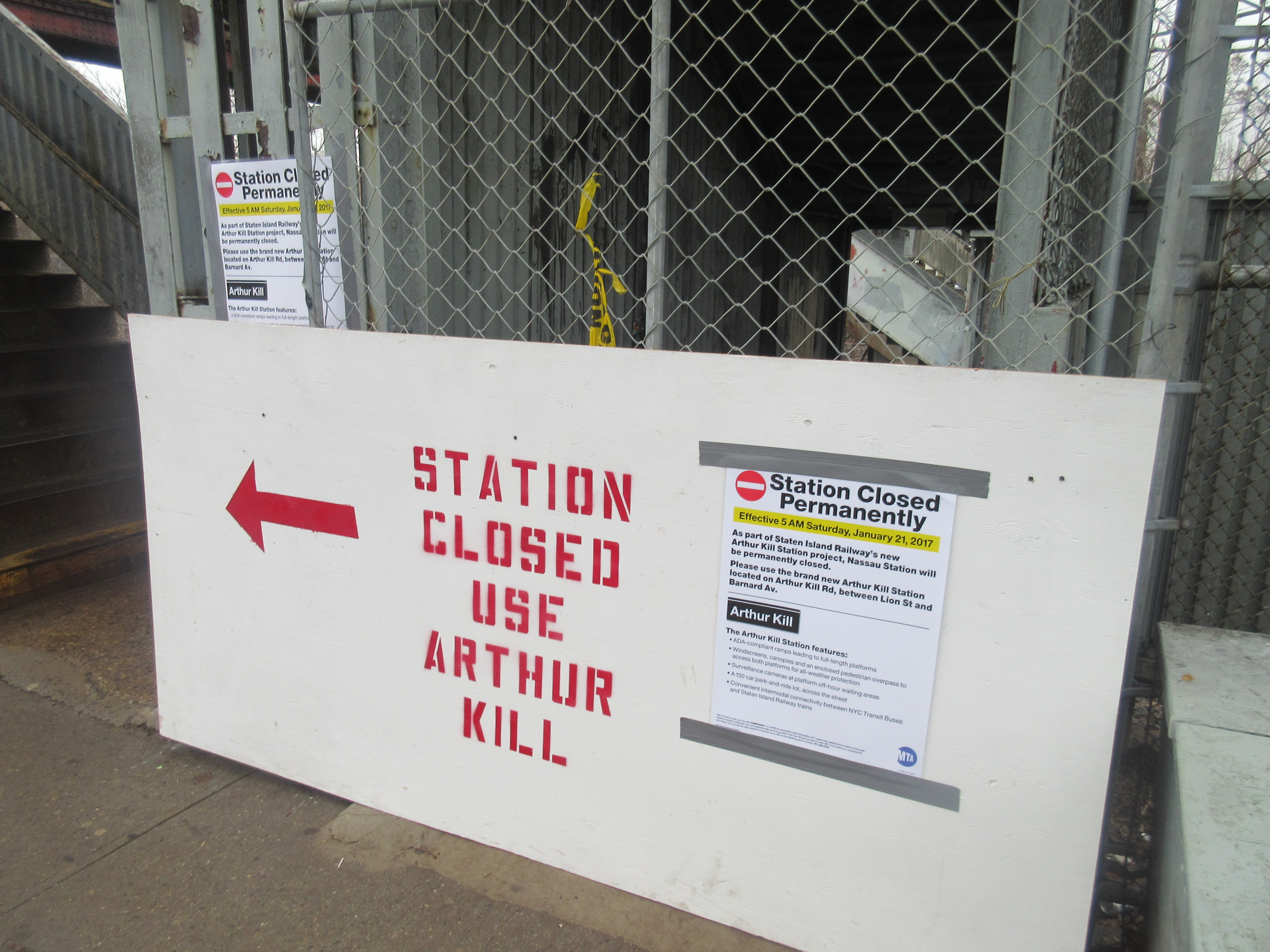
A sign barricading the entrance to the Nassau station, directing passengers to the new Arthur Kill station

Prior to its demolition, the Nassau station consisted of two four-car length (300 foot) side platforms, of which three-fourths towards the station's east (railroad north) end were closed and walled-off. Only 80 feet (24 m) of the platforms could be used, and therefore, like the nearby Atlantic station, only the last door of the last car of a train could serve the station.

An abandoned siding sits next to the southbound (geographically northern) platform, which used to serve the Nassau Smelting & Refining Company. The overpass was designed to allow for enough clearance for trains to pass over the siding.

The St. George-bound platform was accessed from the intersection of Bethel Avenue and Saint Andrews Place, while the Tottenville-bound platform led to the end of Nassau Place. At the west (railroad south) end of the station, an overpass connected the two platforms, and had an exit at Nassau Place. This would allow people to cross the railway. The staircase to St. Andrews Place has no canopy, while the staircase to Nassau Place has one. The staircase to the Tottenville-bound platform from the overpass, and the staircase down from St. Andrews Place to the St. George-bound platform, were demolished.

M	Mezzanine	Former exit/entrance and crossover between platforms
P Platform level	Side platform, demolished
P Platform level	Southbound	← does not stop here (Arthur Kill)
P Platform level	Northbound	does not stop here (Richmond Valley) →
P Platform level	Side platform, demolished
