= Tompkinsville station =

Staten Island Railway station

Tompkinsville
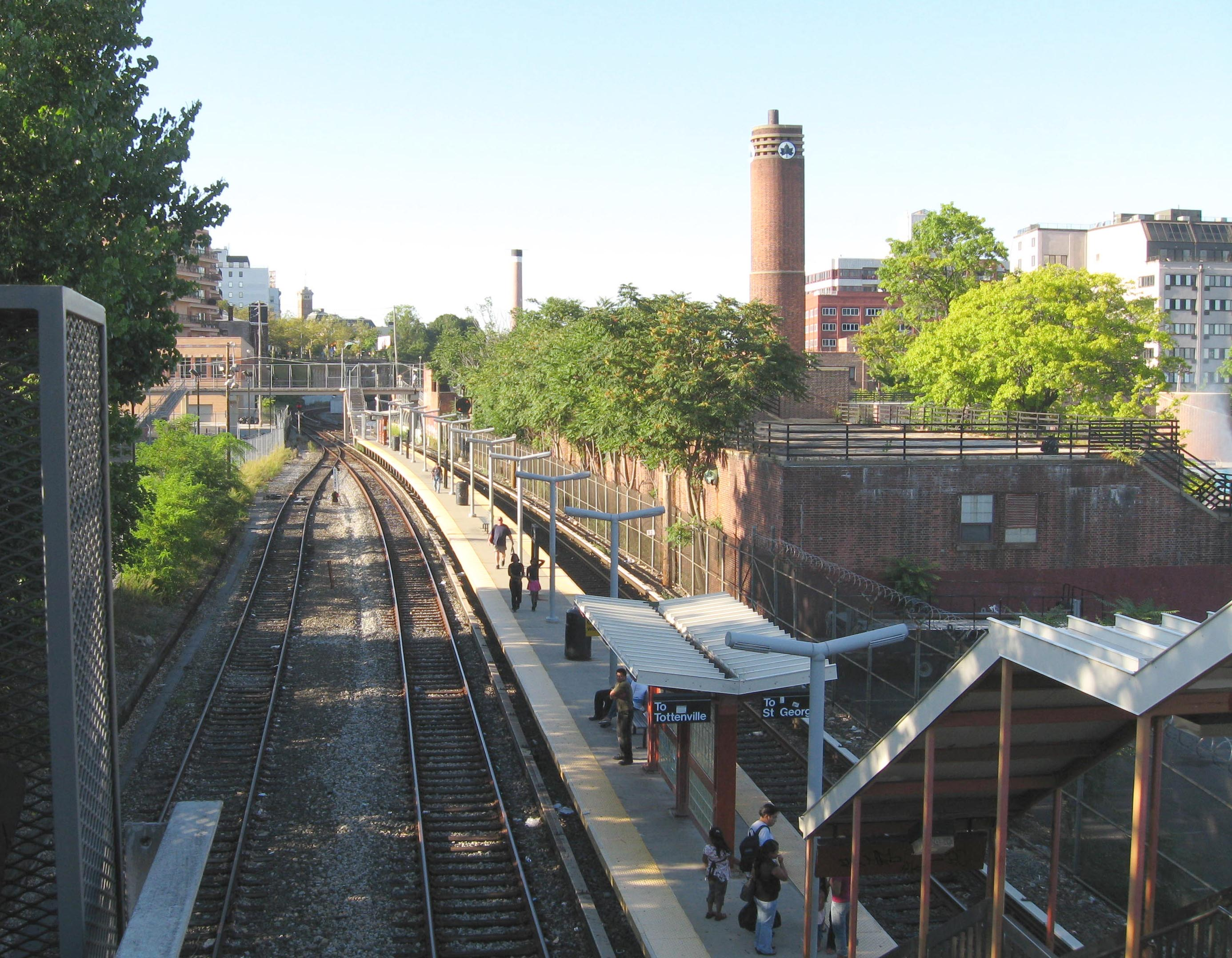
- Tompkinsville station from above

General information
- Location: Bay Street and Victory Boulevard; Tompkinsville, Staten Island
- Coordinates: 40.6368°N 74.0748°W
- Platforms: 1 island platform
- Tracks: 3 (1 not in revenue service)
- Connections: NYCT Bus: S46, S48, S51, S61, S62, S66, S74, S76, S78, S81, S84, S86, S91, S92, S96, S98

Construction
- Structure type: At-grade

Other information
- Station code: 502

History
- Opened: July 31, 1884; 142 years ago

Services
Preceding station	Staten Island Railway	Following station
St. George Terminus	Staten Island Railway	Stapleton toward Tottenville
Track layout
Location

The Tompkinsville station is a Staten Island Railway station in the neighborhood of Tompkinsville, Staten Island, New York. It is located at Victory Boulevard and Bay Street on the railroad's main line. This is one of two stations on the line that require fare payment to enter or exit, the other being St. George.

== History ==
This station opened on July 31, 1884, with the extension of the SIRT from Vanderbilt's Landing (now Clifton) to Tompkinsville.

== Station layout ==
The station is located at grade with an island platform and two tracks. All staircases go up to overpasses at both ends of the station.

M	Station house	Exit/entrance, fare control, overpass to street
G	Bypass track	← No passenger service
G	Southbound	← toward Tottenville (Stapleton) ← rush hour express does not stop here
G	Island platform
G	Northbound	toward St. George (Terminus) → AM rush express does not stop here → (No service: Richmond County Bank Ballpark)

=== Exits ===
The north entrance leads to Victory Boulevard, where an overpass leads west to Bay Street and east to Joseph H. Lyons Pool. There is a parking lot adjacent to the southbound track at Victory Boulevard. The south entrance leads to Hannah Street. There is a third track adjacent to the southbound track at the southern end of the station; it is part of the Tompkinsville Non-Revenue Repair Shop, which contains barns on both sides of the line and is south of this station. The shop was repaired in the 1990s, with the contract awarded in May 1994 for $1,969,777. As part of the project, a 4,000-square-foot (370 m^{2}) addition was made to the facility, the existing freight house was demolished, the interior of the shop building was renovated, and the area in front of the building was paved. The Victory Boulevard pedestrian overpass was replaced in 1999.

Because one-fifth of passengers transferring to the Staten Island Ferry used to exit or enter at Tompkinsville to avoid paying the fare at St. George (located 0.5 miles (0.8 km) away), it was estimated that the Staten Island Railway was losing $3.4 million a year due to fare avoidance. Therefore, the Metropolitan Transportation Authority closed the Victory Boulevard entrance on August 28, 2008. A new $6.9 million station house was built, which included turnstiles for both entering and exiting customers; it opened on January 20, 2010. The Hannah Street entrance on the station's south end closed on the same day and is now used only for emergencies.
