= Richmond Engine Co. 1 =

Volunteer fire department in New York City

Coordinates: 40°34′19″N 74°8′36.6″W

Operational area
- Country: United States
- State: New York
- City: New York City

Agency overview
- Established: 1903
- Staffing: Volunteer

Facilities and equipment
- Stations: 1
- Engines: 1

Richmond Engine Co. 1 is volunteer fire department located in the Richmondtown neighborhood of Staten Island, New York City, New York that works in cooperation with the New York City Fire Department.

== Operations ==
Richmond Engine is one of two Staten Island volunteer fire companies, the other being Oceanic H&L Company No. 1 founded in 1881.

Richmond Engine is dispatched by the Staten Island Communications Office of the Fire Department of New York (FDNY) and operates on the FDNY Staten Island frequency.

Typically the department responds in addition to the initial assignment dispatched by the FDNY. The company is fully trained and operational with the apparatus and equipment they have. Therefore, when they arrive first or when needed they will implement their operations alongside FDNY as applicable.

== Apparatus ==
Richmond Engine currently operates one piece of apparatus, Engine 1 a 2005 American LaFrance
