= Richmond Valley station =

Staten Island Railway station

Richmond Valley
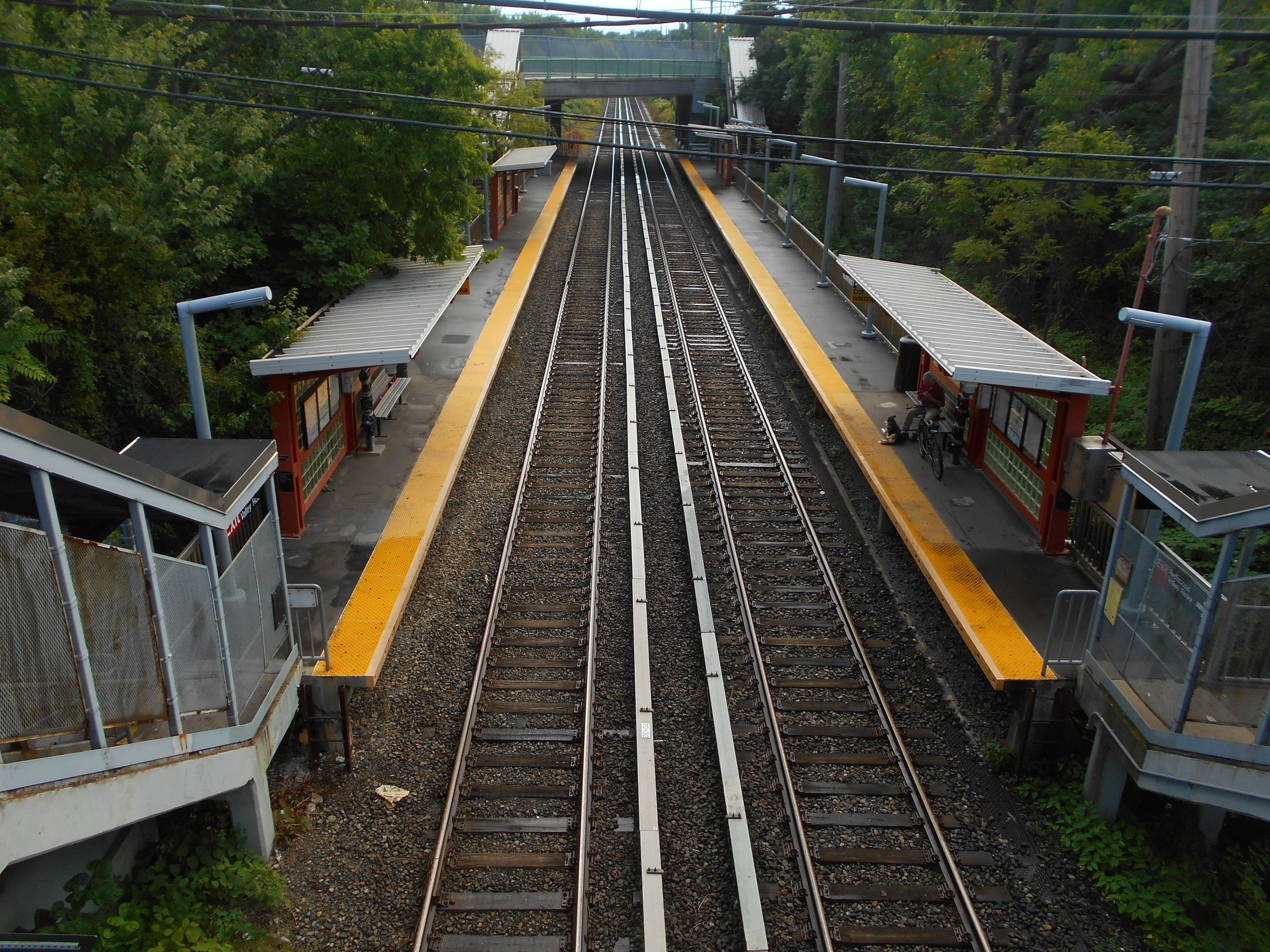
- View of the platforms from the Champ Court overpass

General information
- Location: Richmond Valley Road and Amboy Road; Richmond Valley, Staten Island
- Coordinates: 40.5196°N 74.2293°W
- Platforms: 2 side platforms
- Tracks: 2
- Connections: NYCT Bus: SIM26

Construction
- Structure type: Open-cut / At-grade

Other information
- Station code: 519

History
- Opened: June 2, 1860; 166 years ago

Services
Preceding station	Staten Island Railway	Following station
Pleasant Plains toward St. George	Staten Island Railway	Arthur Kill toward Tottenville
Former services
Preceding station	Staten Island Railway	Following station
Pleasant Plains toward St. George	Staten Island Railway	Nassau Closed 2017 toward Tottenville
Track layout
Location

The Richmond Valley station is a Staten Island Railway station in the neighborhood of Richmond Valley, Staten Island, New York. Located at Richmond Valley Road and Amboy Road on the main line, the station is a mixture of open cut (below grade level) at the north end and grade level at the south end.

== History ==
The station opened on June 2, 1860 with the opening of the Staten Island Railway (SIR) from Annadale to Tottenville. The opening of the station gave the surrounding area a separate identity from Tottenville. While it had been considered part of Tottenville, it became its own neighborhood once the area was named Richmond Valley by the SIR. The station consisted of a wooden stationhouse and a ticket office, which were located on the northbound platform, which was located to the south of the Richmond Valley Road grade crossing. However, the southbound platform was located to the north of the Richmond Valley Road.

On the evening of March 9, 1874, someone set the passenger and freight depot at the station on fire. They had cut a hole through the floor underneath in the building and set a pile of straw and wood ablaze. The fire was discovered in time to save the building.

In 1940, the grade crossing at Richmond Valley Road was eliminated as the street was raised over the railroad tracks as part of a project to remove grade crossings across Staten Island.

The platforms at the station were replaced in 1970.

Under the 2015–2019 MTA Capital Plan, the station is undergoing a complete overhaul as part of the Enhanced Station Initiative. While the station would remain open during the project, construction in adjacent areas would require occasional one-direction service at the station on certain weekends. Updates would include cellular service, Wi-Fi, charging stations, improved signage, and improved station lighting. The station would feature many of the improvements made at the new Arthur Kill station, which is the next stop to the south. As part of the overhaul, the station would have artwork installed as part of the MTA Arts & Design program. The project, which began on June 4, 2018, would repair the station's concrete structure, platforms, staircases, canopies and columns. The $2.2 million contract was to be completed after ten months.

== West Shore Line ==
Directly to the south of the station, a non-electrified spur branched off of the Tottenville-bound track, which once ran all the way to the Arthur Kill. The spur, built in 1928, was called the West Shore Line by the Baltimore and Ohio Railroad (B&O), which owned the Staten Island Rapid Transit. It was used to deliver building materials to the Outerbridge Crossing construction site near the Kill. Years later, the track was used to serve a scrapyard owned by the Roselli Brothers. Until 2013, the track remained intact to Page Avenue, with the right-of-way ballasted, and with the switch in working condition to allow for trains to be stored, as evidenced by the fouling point sign. However, that year, the connection was severed. The rails still exist past the old connection just to the west of the right-of-way. Underneath Page Avenue, the track split into two other tracks, with the rails still in place. The right-of-way for the line was an easement on the property of Nassau Metals, and was later used by CSX. Some sections of the old tracks have been removed, while others still remain in the overgrowth.

== Station layout ==
There are two side platforms and the station is orange color with the south overpass appearing to be an addition during a renovation. Because of the short platform, only all doors on the first three cars and the first three doors on the fourth car open. Mill Creek, which leads to the Arthur Kill, passes beneath part of the platform, and travels underneath the SIR through a culvert.

M	Mezzanine	Overpass between platforms
G Platform level	Side platform
G Platform level	Southbound	← toward Tottenville (Arthur Kill)
G Platform level	Northbound	toward St. George (Pleasant Plains) →
G Platform level	Side platform
G Platform level	Street level	Exit/entrance, buses

=== Exits ===
The station has exits on both its north and south ends. The north exit leads to Richmond Valley Road while the south exit leads to Amboy Road.
