= Arthur Kill station =

Staten Island Railway station

Arthur Kill
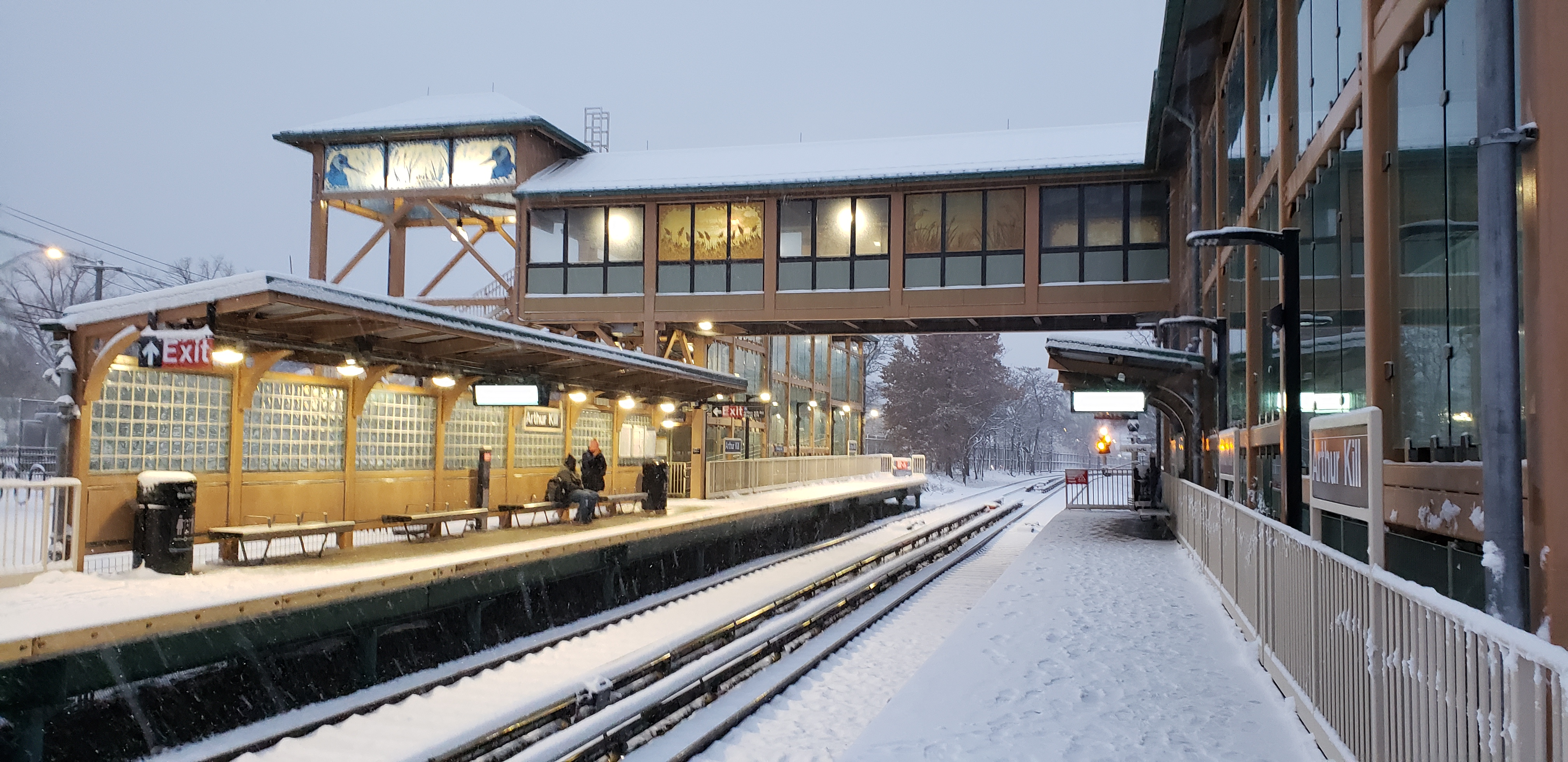
- The Arthur Kill station in November 2018

General information
- Location: Arthur Kill Road, near Lion Street and Barnard Avenue; Tottenville, Staten Island
- Coordinates: 40.5168°N 74.2416°W
- Platforms: 2 side platforms
- Tracks: 2
- Connections: NYCT Bus: S78

Construction
- Structure type: At-grade
- Accessible: Yes

Other information
- Station code: 523

History
- Opened: January 21, 2017; 9 years ago

Services
Preceding station	Staten Island Railway	Following station
Richmond Valley toward St. George	Staten Island Railway	Tottenville Terminus
Track layout
Location

Arthur Kill station is a station on the Staten Island Railway (SIR). The station opened on January 21, 2017, replacing the Atlantic and Nassau stations, which were the two stations in the poorest condition along the line at the time. It is located on Arthur Kill Road near Lion Street and Barnard Avenue, in the Tottenville neighborhood of Staten Island. It has two tracks and two side platforms, and is accessible via ramps.

== Station layout ==
This station has two tracks and two side platforms, with an overpass connecting the platforms. As opposed to the Nassau and Atlantic stations, which this station replaces, both platforms can accommodate 300-foot-long (91 m) trains. Those stations only had single-door boarding. There are benches and surveillance cameras on both platforms and windscreens, which are covered by canopies. The total cost of the station was $27.6 million. An art installation, titled Tottenville Sun, Tottenville Sky and created by Jenna Lucente, was installed in the windscreens as part of the station construction. Consisting of 28 laminated glass panels, it depicts the landscape and wildlife of the adjacent community.

The station is ADA-accessible via two ramps, one on each side of the overpass. It includes a 150-car parking lot, on SIR property, which can be expanded in the future.

M	Mezzanine	Crossover between platforms
G Platform level	Side platform
G Platform level	Southbound	← toward Tottenville (Terminus)
G Platform level	Northbound	toward St. George (Richmond Valley) →
G Platform level	Side platform
G Platform level	Street level	Exit/entrance, buses Ramps to both platforms from Arthur Kill Road

== History ==
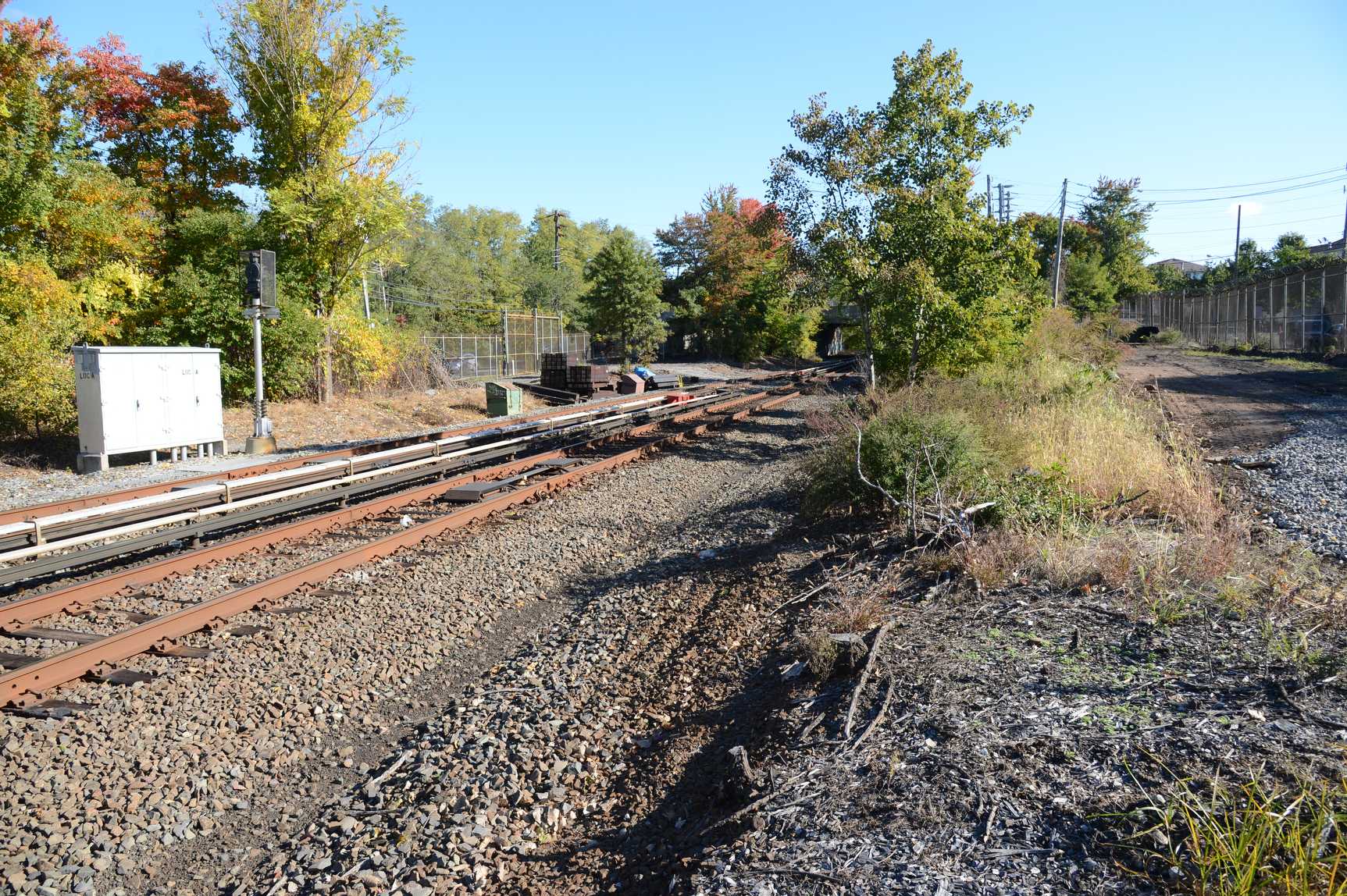
Station site in October 2013

The construction of an Arthur Kill station was first proposed in the 1990s to replace the Atlantic and Nassau stations, which were located directly to the north and south of the station, respectively. Commuters from these stations were only allowed access from the last cars of the trains. As a result, these two stations were not included in station modernization programs with other stations. The construction of the station had been deferred due to budget constraints, but funding for it was included in the 2010–2014 MTA Capital Program, with $16 million allocated to the project.

Despite a 2010 expected completion date, construction ended up delayed due to a lack of funding in the capital program. A groundbreaking ceremony was held on October 18, 2013, with a projected opening date of late 2015. In July 2015, the opening date was then pushed back to August 2016, with delays caused in part by the addition of storm resiliency measures. In June 2016, the station's opening was pushed back once again to November due to changes in the Electric Distribution Room. In October 2016, the opening date was pushed back yet again to January 2017 because of a need to redesign the electrical distribution room, the exterior wall panel, and various communications issues. The station opened on January 21, 2017, at 5:00 a.m, replacing the adjacent former stations at Nassau and Atlantic, which were permanently closed on the same day.
