= Atlantic station (Staten Island Railway) =

Former railway station in Staten Island

Atlantic
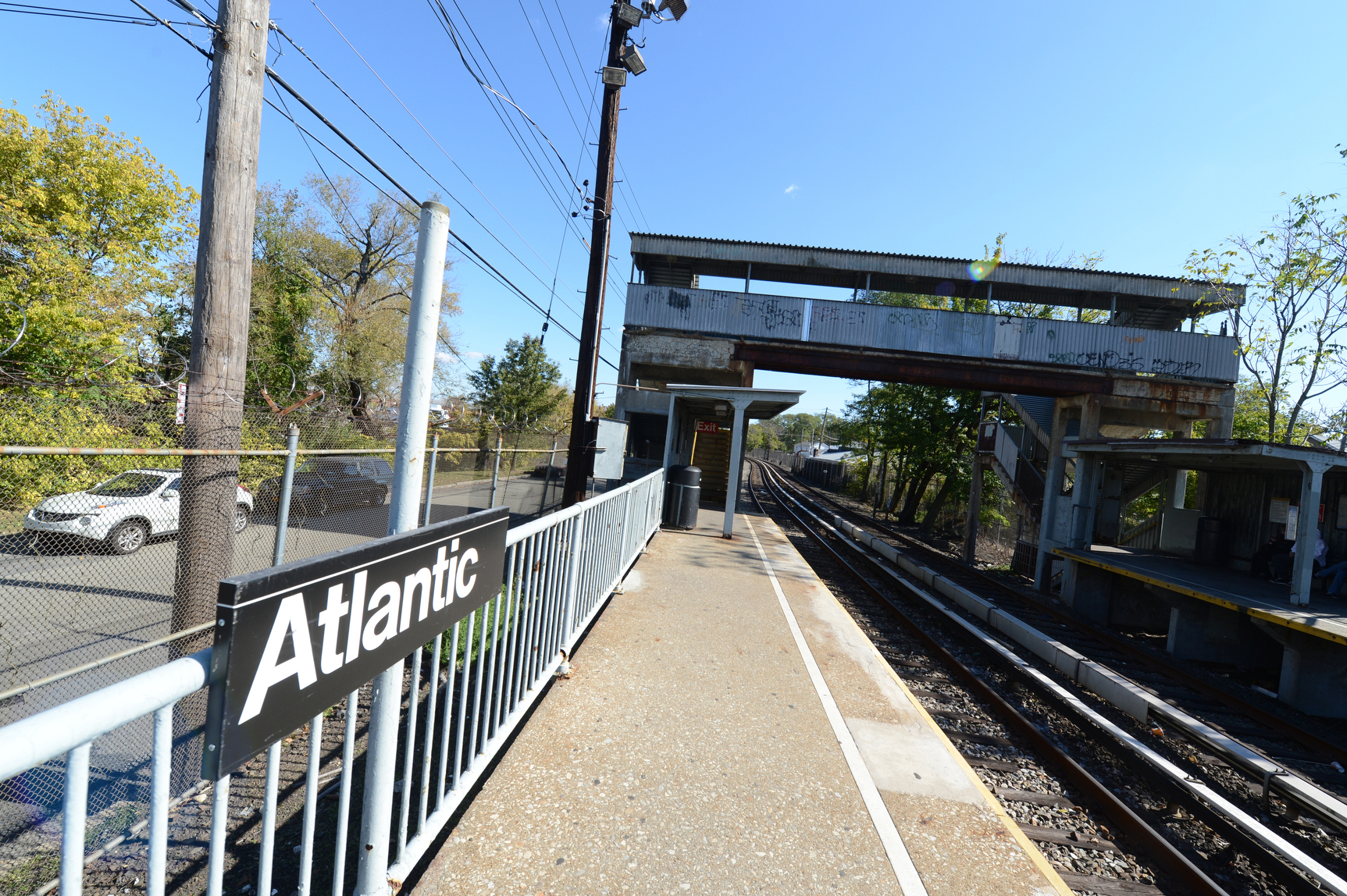
- A view of the station prior to its demolition

General information
- Location: Arthur Kill Road and Tracy Avenue; Tottenville, Staten Island
- Coordinates: 40.51542°N 74.2457°W
- Platforms: 2 side platforms
- Tracks: 2

Construction
- Structure type: At-grade

Other information
- Station code: 521

History
- Opened: c.1909-1911
- Closed: January 21, 2017; 9 years ago

Former services
Preceding station	Staten Island Railway	Following station
Nassau toward St. George	Staten Island Railway	Tottenville Terminus
Track layout
Location

Atlantic station was a Staten Island Railway station in the neighborhood of Tottenville, Staten Island, New York. With the condition of the station having deteriorated after the 1990s, this station, and the Nassau station to the north, were replaced by a new station at Arthur Kill Road. When that station opened in January 2017, Atlantic station closed and was subsequently demolished.

== History ==
The station's exact opening date is not certain, but it is known that the station opened between 1909 and 1911. The station was primarily built to serve the workers of the former Atlantic Terra Cotta Company factory, from where the station name originated. The pedestrian overpass was built in the 1930s. There used to be a grade crossing adjacent to the station, and at least until the 1970s, a small shanty that protected it still existed.

The Metropolitan Transportation Authority purchased and gained control of the Staten Island Rapid Transit in 1971, and started to modernize the rail line. The stations on the line were modernized again in the 1990s, with the exception of Atlantic, and the nearby Nassau station, which also was built to serve a factory. As a result, these two stations were the only visual remains of a time when the SIRT built new platforms in the 1960s during a multi-phase grade elimination project farther north but without adding new canopies or shelters at these stops. Instead, these two stations were set to be replaced with a new ADA-accessible station in between the two at Arthur Kill Road. However, the funds required for the construction of the project were not available, pushing back the construction of the project to 2013. Construction on the replacement Arthur Kill station commenced in October 2013, and after several delays opened on January 21, 2017. Once the new station opened, Atlantic closed and demolition followed in May 2017.

== Station layout ==
Located roughly at Fisher Avenue and Arthur Kill Road on the main line, it was at grade level with side platforms approximately 80 feet (24 m) long that could hold only one car. Former operations before the station closed only had the last car stop at the platform. Prior to its demolition, the station still had pre-1990s SIRT station components—steel corrugated walls, overpasses and original 4-foot (1.2 m)-high station pipe railings with faded signs.

Access to the northbound platform was via the short dead-end Tracy Avenue off of Arthur Kill Road between Fisher and Wood Avenues, while the southbound platform was reached from an entrance on Ellis Street. An overpass linked both platforms; this was the last surviving remnant of the station prior to its demolition in 2022. The stairways leading down to the platform were demolished along with the station.

M	Mezzanine	Former crossover between platforms
P Platform level	Side platform, demolished
P Platform level	Southbound	← does not stop here (Tottenville)
P Platform level	Northbound	does not stop here (Arthur Kill) →
P Platform level	Side platform, demolished
G	Street level	Exits/entrances
