= Oceanic H&L Company No. 1 =

Coordinates: 40°35′35.5″N 74°11′16″W

Oceanic Hook & Ladder Co.No.1 INC
Operational area
- Country: United States
- State: New York
- City: New York City

Agency overview
- Established: April 17, 1881
- Staffing: Volunteer

Facilities and equipment
- Stations: 1
- Engines: 1
- Wildland: 2

Oceanic H&L Co.No.1 INC is a volunteer fire department located in the Travis neighborhood of Staten Island in New York City. It works in cooperation with the New York City Fire Department. Oceanic was formed April 17, 1881. The firehouse was moved by horse from its original location at 29 Meredith Avenue in 1902 to its current location at 4010 Victory Boulevard.

Typically the department responds in addition to the initial assignment dispatched by the FDNY. The department is fully trained and operational with the apparatus and equipment they have. Therefore, when they arrive on a scene first, or when needed, they will implement their operations alongside FDNY as applicable. Oceanic currently operates three pieces of apparatus, Engine 1, a 1997 Seagrave (formerly FDNY Engine 40), and the Brush Unit, a 1959 Dodge M37/1975 Scat. Brush Unit, a 1993 M35A3WW (with winch) AM General.Eastern Surplus modified the apparatus by shortening the chassis and removing one of the rear axles, converting the unit to four wheel-drive. It is equipped with a skid with a 24-ton winch, 75 GPM pump, 300-gallon water tank and 12-gallon foam tank. This Brush truck was part of a 100,000.00 grant 50,000.00(truck) and 50,000.00 (building maintenance) provided by Assemblyman Michael Cusick.

Oceanic is the oldest of the two currently existing volunteer fire companies in the county. Richmond Engine Co. 1 was founded in 1903. They are dispatched by the FDNY Staten Island Communications Office and operate on the FDNY Staten Island frequency.

Oceanic has a roster of 38 Active members headed by Captain James Wakie.

Metropolitan Fire Explorer Company was founded in 1976. They are located on the grounds of Seaview Hospital in Willowbrook. While Metro Fire operates two fire engines, they respond primarily to rescue calls, search and rescue, event standbys, and perform fire patrols.
