= Travis, Staten Island =

Neighborhood in New York City

Coordinates: 40°35′37″N 74°11′14″W

Linoleumville, part of Ward 3, 1911

Travis is a residential and industrial neighborhood in west-central Staten Island, one of the five boroughs of New York City.

It is bounded on the north by Meredith Avenue and Victory Boulevard, on the east by the William T. Davis Wildlife Refuge, on the south by the Fresh Kills, and on the west by the Arthur Kill. Some local geographers classify Travis as being part of the island's West Shore, while others reckon it as a Mid-Island neighborhood.

== History ==
Travis is one of the oldest, as well as one of the more isolated and sparsely populated locales on Staten Island. The site of an Indian village, it was known as Jersey Wharf and, during the Revolutionary period, as New Blazing Star Ferry. It was a skirmish site during the Battle of Staten Island. It was the site of ferries from 1757 and was for decades part of the route between Philadelphia and New York via the Port Richmond Ferry. In the early 19th century the village was named Travisville after Captain Jacob Travis. In mid-century it was named Long Neck and then Deckertown after a local early settler family originating from Holland. Johannes de Decker, the progenitor, arrived on Staten Island in 1655.

In 1873, the American Linoleum Company acquired 300 acres in the area to build the nation's first linoleum factory. The inventor of Linoleum, Frederick Walton, spent two years in Travis setting up the factory. Many skilled English immigrants arrived to work in the factory in its early days, and the area was named Linoleumville. By the early 20th century, 700 workers were employed, comprising half the local population. Many of these were Polish immigrants, and Linoleumville had become a Polish enclave. The plant closed in 1931 and residents overwhelmingly chose to rename the community Travis.

In later years, Travis's isolation has been somewhat disrupted by the construction of the West Shore Expressway and the Teleport. The area has sometimes suffered from poor air quality due to the nearby Fresh Kills Landfill and New Jersey's Chemical Coast.

== Culture ==
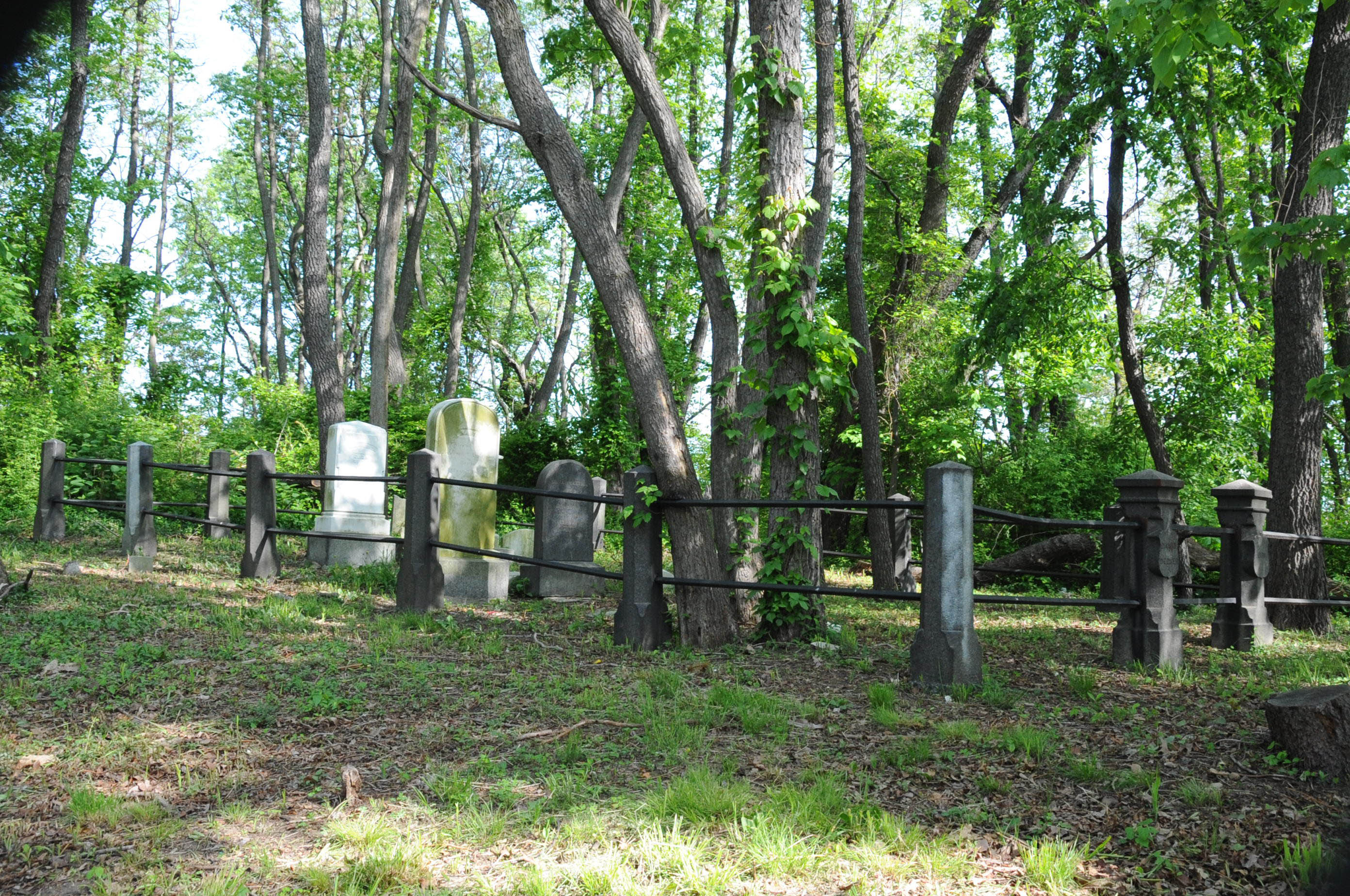
Sylvan Grove Cemetery

Travis is noted throughout Staten Island for the colorful annual Independence Day parade, held since 1911. Many members of the community's founding families are buried in Sylvan Grove Cemetery, a small triangular burial ground near the junction of Victory Boulevard and the West Shore Expressway, which had fallen into severe disarray, mostly due to vandalism. An island-wide charitable organization, the Friends of Abandoned Cemeteries of Staten Island, was founded in 1982 in an effort to restore this and other assorted small cemeteries on the island that have been unused for decades, and in some cases, even centuries. Construction is scheduled for the area next to the cemetery to be turned into "Independence Park". Work began in November 2010.

Travis is also home to the Mid Island Little League, who won the 1964 Little League World Series. Mid Island Little League is located at the intersection of Travis Avenue and Victory Boulevard.

Travis is also the subject of a song written by William W. Spooner. "This song is a story about a small town named Travis, located on Staten Island just outside of NYC. Built on a landfill, the song talks about the people living in this area and their struggles." This song was based on a true story from his Childhood growing up in the area.

== Facilities ==
The 1980s saw an expansion of commercial development along the West Shore Expressway, including a giant UA Movie and Bowling Complex; that complex no longer houses a movie theater. The 5,000-seat Phil Esposito Sports and Entertainment Center, which would have served as the home of the New York Slapshots hockey team beginning in the 1985–1986 season, was planned for a site adjacent to the Courts of Appeal Racquetball and Tennis Club, but the arena was never built. The West Shore Plaza was also built in this area, with the island's only Burlington Coat Factory as the anchor store (before this, it was a flea market, Bradlee's Store and Caldor). Also part of this expansion was a large industrial park called the Teleport, located at the eastern edge of Travis. It houses mostly companies engaged in the Internet and telecommunications industries. The service roads of the West Shore Expressway are also the site of retail and other businesses.

Travis is home to FDNY Squad Company 8, which also houses a spare fire engine and Brush Fire Unit 4. Also protecting Travis is one of the last volunteer fire houses in the city, and second on Staten Island, Oceanic H&L Company No. 1. Oceanic was formed in 1881, making it one of the oldest volunteer fire houses in the country. The fire house itself was located on the other side of town and moved down Victory Boulevard by horse to where it is today.

The building of the UA movie theater complex has changed Travis dramatically over the last decade. Traffic patterns have changed along with new development of homes. Many of the older homes that sat on large plots of land are being torn down and replaced with new row homes. Even with this building boom, Travis has retained many of the characteristics that made it the last frontier on Staten Island. Still standing is the old Tennyson's Confectionery. It now is a balloon and party store, but this once held a penny candy store that was operational for almost one hundred years. It is located across from the Oceanic Hook and Ladder firehouse and was a popular hangout for the locals and firemen. Owned by "Snappy" Ed Tennyson, called that because he moved so slowly, it was handed down to his son-in-law, Robert Minto, Jr., who ran the store just about up to his death in 1986.

The last commercial farm in Travis was purchased by the city's Parks Department in 1922, operating as the agency's Plant Ecology Center and Nursery.

== Transportation ==
The western terminus of Victory Boulevard, a major thoroughfare on Staten Island, is at Travis. Established in 1816 by Daniel D. Tompkins as the Richmond Turnpike, this road was "promoted as the fastest route from New York to Philadelphia". On this road, bus service along the island's North Shore to the College of Staten Island and St. George Ferry Terminal is provided by the S62 and S92 routes. A ferry across the Arthur Kill linked Travis with Carteret, New Jersey. It stopped running in 1929. However, a passenger ferry did remain in operation until the mid-1960s.

Travis is served by freight trains on the Travis Branch of the Staten Island Railway, which leads into the Howland Hook Container Terminal and the North Shore Branch.

Travis is also served by direct express bus service to and from Manhattan during rush hours. The SIM32 runs along Victory Boulevard. The SIM2, SIM22, SIM23, SIM24, SIM25 and SIM26 run along the West Shore Expressway, but only the SIM2, SIM25 and SIM26 make stops in Travis along West Service Road (southbound) and East Service Road (northbound).

== Education ==
Travis is home to P.S. 26 of the New York City Department of Education. In early 2020 plans for a new 476-seat elementary school entered the public review process, as announced by Borough President James Oddo.

== Notable residents ==
- Ichabod Crane was a real-life distinguished military officer who lived at 3525 Victory Boulevard, located within the modern boundaries of Travis. He detested Washington Irving for creating a fictional cowardly teacher of the same name and appearance in The Legend of Sleepy Hollow. Irving and the real Crane met in 1814 early in Crane's military career.
- Isabel González, while not officially a resident, dragged then-called Linoleumville into the middle of the fight for Puerto Ricans' rights as US citizens. Her fiancé had left her behind in Puerto Rico in 1902, so he could seek employment in the factory town of Linoleumville where her brother was already employed. When she attempted to join him, she was stopped by US Immigration officials and denied legal status due to her being unmarried and pregnant (and thus a possible burden on society). At the time, Puerto Ricans were not considered US citizens. This led to a series of legal battles including one before the Supreme Court. Her activism eventually led to Puerto Ricans being recognized as US citizens after Congress passed a law in 1917.
- Billy Urbanski, a player for the Boston Braves, was born in "Linoleumville", renamed Travis in 1931.
- Pfc. Fred J. Walczak was present at the famous flag raising at Iwo Jima. He appears in Joe Rosenthal's "Gung Ho" photo of the entire Marine patrol sent up Mount Suribachi to raise the flag. He was also wounded at Iwo Jima. He was from 150 Burke Ave in Travis.
- Paul Zindel grew up in Travis. During his teenage years, he lived at 123 Glen Street. Zindel based many of his young-adult stories on Staten Island, particularly The Pigman, which is set on Howard Avenue in Grymes Hill, on the other side of Staten Island from Travis.

== Demographics ==
For census purposes, the New York City Department of City Planning classifies Travis as part of a larger Neighborhood Tabulation Area called New Springville-Willowbrook-Bulls Head-Travis SI0204. This designated neighborhood had 42,871 inhabitants based on data from the 2020 United States Census. This was an increase of 3,561 persons (9.1%) from the 39,310 counted in 2010. The neighborhood had a population density of 8.5 inhabitants per acre (14,500/sq mi; 5,600/km^{2}).

The racial makeup of the neighborhood was 59.5% (25,502) White (Non-Hispanic), 3.0% (1,295) Black (Non-Hispanic), 19.6% (8,401) Asian, and 2.6% (1,136) from two or more races. Hispanic or Latino of any race were 15.2% (6,537) of the population.

According to the 2020 United States Census, this area has many cultural communities of over 1,000 inhabitants. This include residents who identify as Mexican, Puerto Rican, Albanian, German, Irish, Italian, Polish, Russian, Egyptian, Korean, and Chinese.

71.0% of the households had at least one family present. Out of the 10,773 households, 51.0% had a married couple (20.7% with a child under 18), 4.4% had a cohabiting couple (1.4% with a child under 18), 16.8% had a single male (1.5% with a child under 18), and 27.9% had a single female (3.9% with a child under 18). 31.8% of households had children. In this neighborhood, 33.4% of non-vacant housing units are renter-occupied.
