= Richmond Valley, Staten Island =

Neighborhood in New York City

Coordinates: 40°31′12″N 74°13′47″W

Richmond Valley is a neighborhood located on the South Shore of Staten Island, one of the five boroughs of New York City, the largest city in the United States. Richmond Valley is bordered on the north by Pleasant Plains, to the south by Tottenville, to the west by the Arthur Kill, and to the east by the Lower New York Bay.

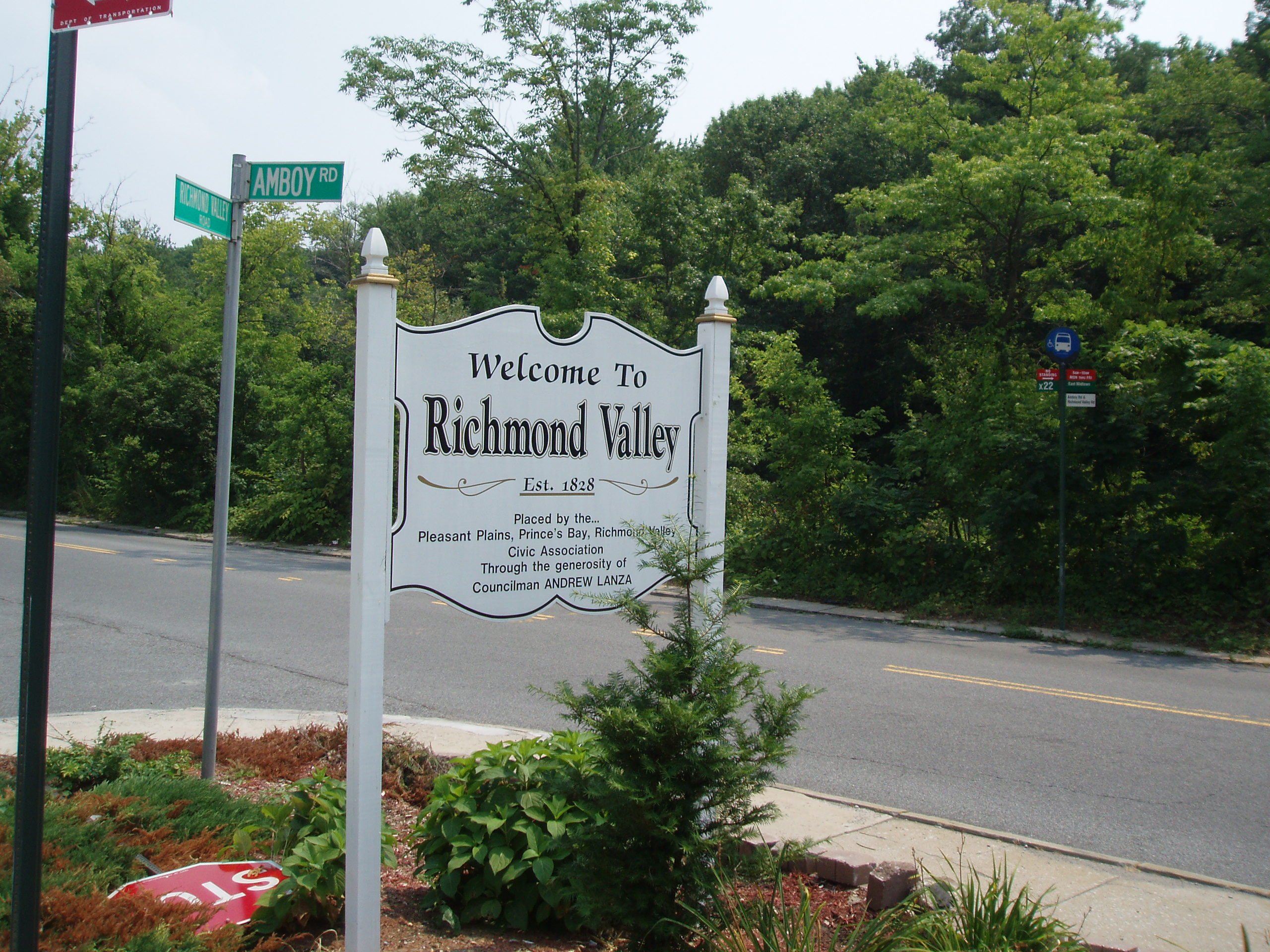
Richmond Valley Welcome Sign

Once considered part of Tottenville, Richmond Valley gained a separate identity when the Richmond Valley (Staten Island Railway station) was opened soon after the railroad was extended to Tottenville in 1860. Today the neighborhood is noted chiefly for being the site of the terminus, on the Staten Island side, of the Outerbridge Crossing, which connects the island to Perth Amboy, New Jersey, across the Arthur Kill.

The neighborhood is represented in the New York State Senate by Andrew Lanza, in the New York State Assembly by Michael Reilly, and in the New York City Council by Frank Morano. All three are members of the Republican Party.

== Transportation ==
Richmond Valley is served by the station of the same name on the Staten Island Railway. The S78 local bus serves Arthur Kill Road. Express bus service to and from Manhattan is provided by the SIM26 along Amboy Road.
