= Tottenville station =

Staten Island Railway station

Tottenville
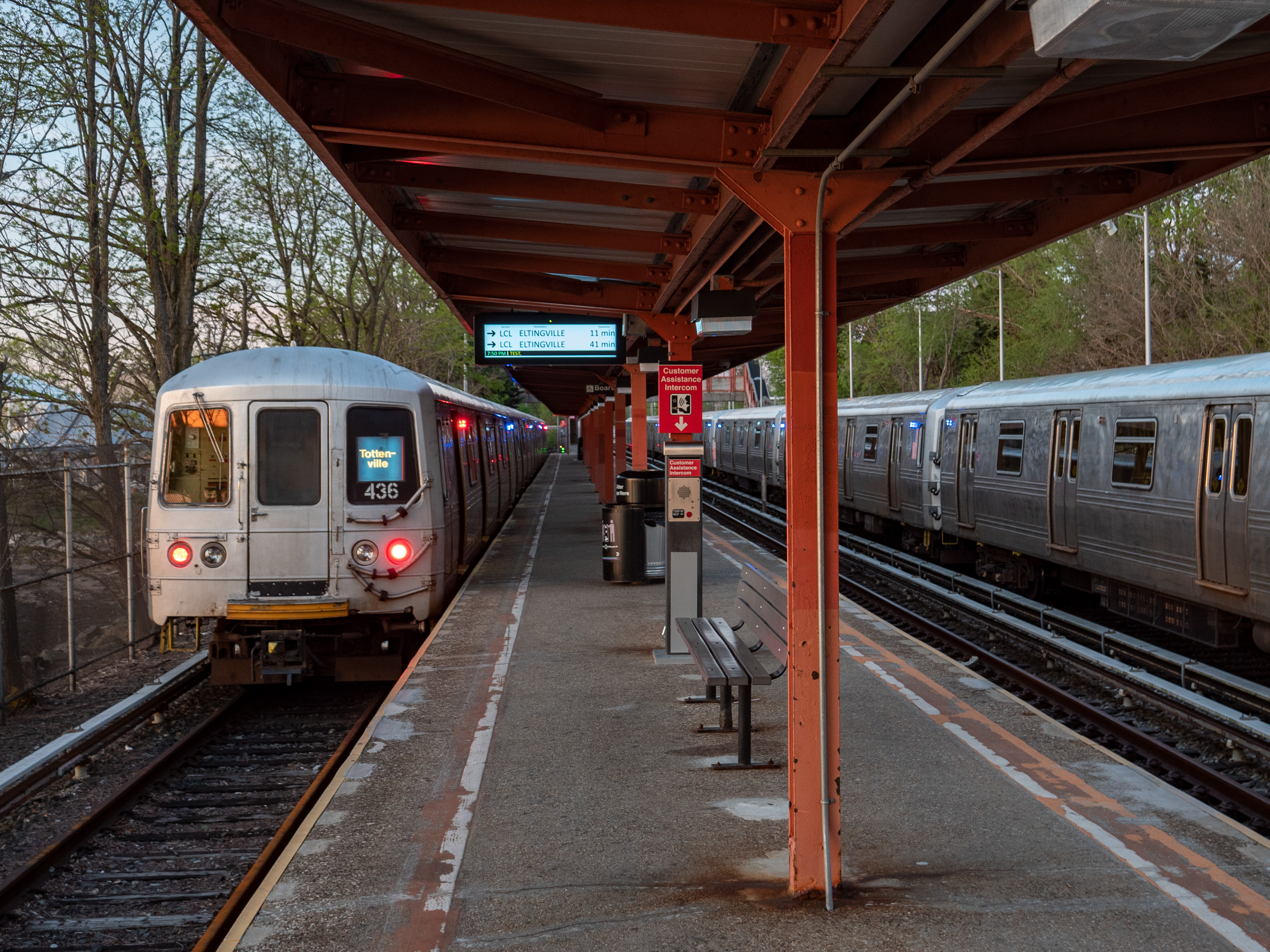
- Tottenville station platform

General information
- Location: Arthur Kill Road and Bentley Street; Tottenville, Staten Island
- Coordinates: 40.5125°N 74.2523°W
- Platforms: 1 island platform
- Tracks: 5 (3 not for passenger service)
- Connections: NYCT Bus: S78

Construction
- Structure type: At-grade
- Accessible: Yes

Other information
- Station code: 522

History
- Opened: June 2, 1860; 166 years ago

Services
Preceding station	Staten Island Railway	Following station
Arthur Kill toward St. George	Staten Island Railway	Terminus
Former services
Preceding station	Staten Island Railway	Following station
Atlantic Closed 2017 toward St. George	Staten Island Railway	Terminus
Track layout
Location

Tottenville station is the final Staten Island Railway rapid transit station in the neighborhood of Tottenville, Staten Island, New York. Located near Main Street and Arthur Kill Road, it is the southern terminus of the Staten Island Railway's main line and the southernmost railway station in both New York City and New York State.

== History ==
The station opened on June 2, 1860, with the opening of the Staten Island Railway from Annadale to Tottenville. Eight shipyards were located at this location in the 1880s. From the year 1860 to 1885, the locomotives of the Staten Island Railway were maintained and repaired at Journea's Shipyard and at Tyrell's Machine shop. A ferry was operated by the Staten Island Railway from 1867 until 1948 that ran across the Arthur Kill to the Perth Amboy Ferry Slip in Perth Amboy, New Jersey. The ferry service dated back to the 1700s and ended on October 17, 1963. There are remains of the old slip to the ferry near the end of Bentley Street, which is now a dead-end street blocked by a Jersey barrier.

The station was destroyed on September 3, 1929 after a fire burned the station down. The fire was attributed to the third rail short circuiting. The two 550 foot (170 m)-long platforms were destroyed as were five train cars being stored near the station. The damage was estimated to cost $200,000. Passengers using the Perth Amboy Ferry were forced to use the nearby Atlantic station instead.

== Derailments ==
On December 26, 2008 at 6:27 a.m., an empty train was pulling into this station to accept passengers for its a.m. rush hour run to St. George when it ran into the bumper block and subsequently derailed. An investigation revealed that the engineer, Kim Canady, fell asleep at the helm, having stayed up late the night before to celebrate Christmas with her family.

On May 29, 2014 at 6:36 a.m., another empty train hit the same bumper block in the station, and the train's engineer and conductor were injured.

== Station layout ==
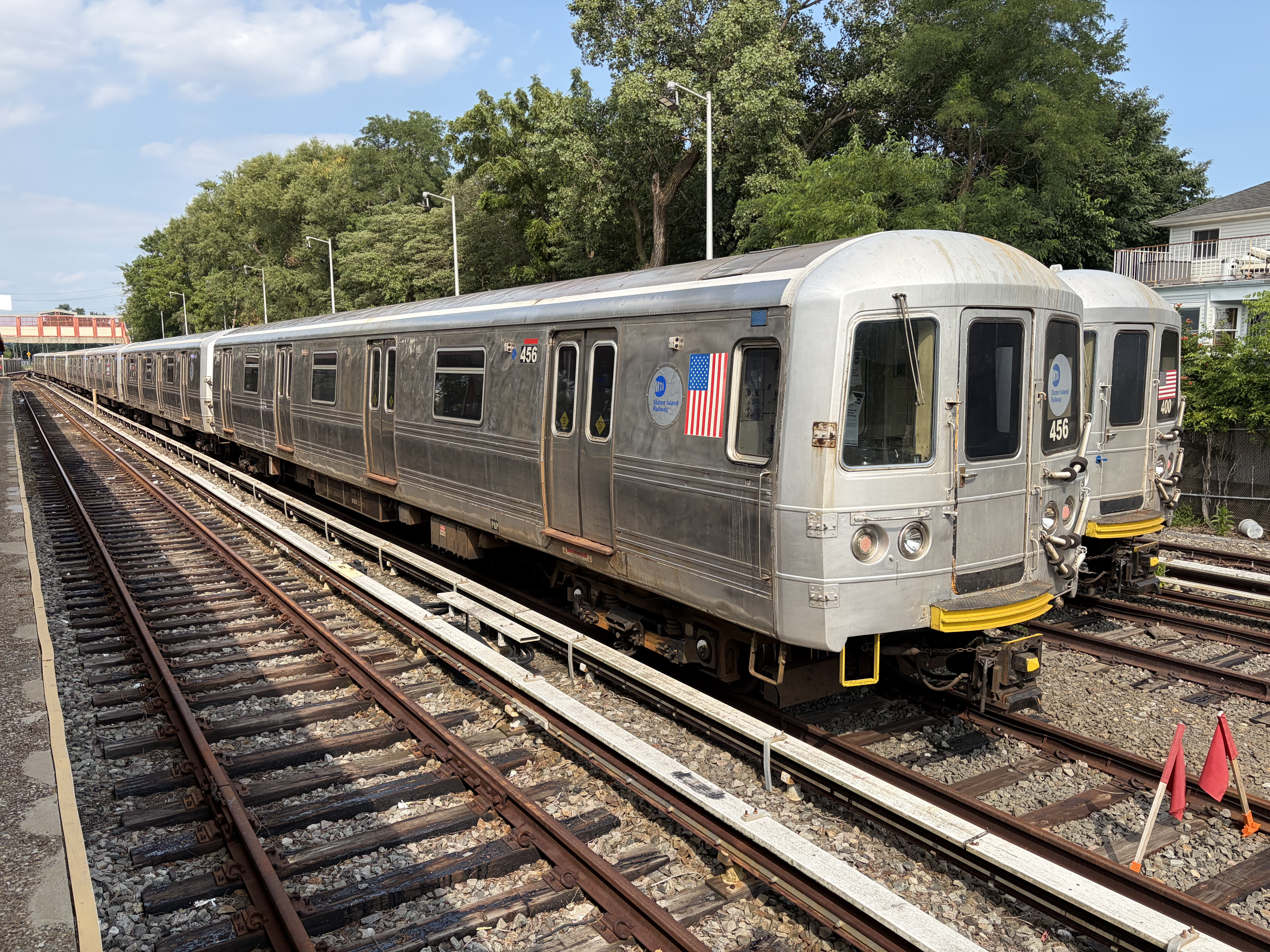
Storage platforms occupied with several R44s

This is a grade-level station with two tracks and an island platform. There are three tracks to the east of the platform for storing trains. All five tracks end at bumper blocks at their south ends. The station color is orange.

During rush hours, this station is served only by express trains from St. George. Local trains from St. George terminate at Great Kills.

M	Mezzanine	Overpass to exit/entrances at Elm and Utah Streets
P Platform level	Northbound	toward St. George (Arthur Kill) →
P Platform level	Island platform
P Platform level	Northbound	toward St. George (Arthur Kill) →
P Platform level	Storage tracks	No passenger service
P Platform level	Storage tracks	No passenger service
P Platform level	Storage tracks	No passenger service
P Platform level	Street level	Exit/entrance to Bentley Street; Ramp at south end of the station

=== Exits ===
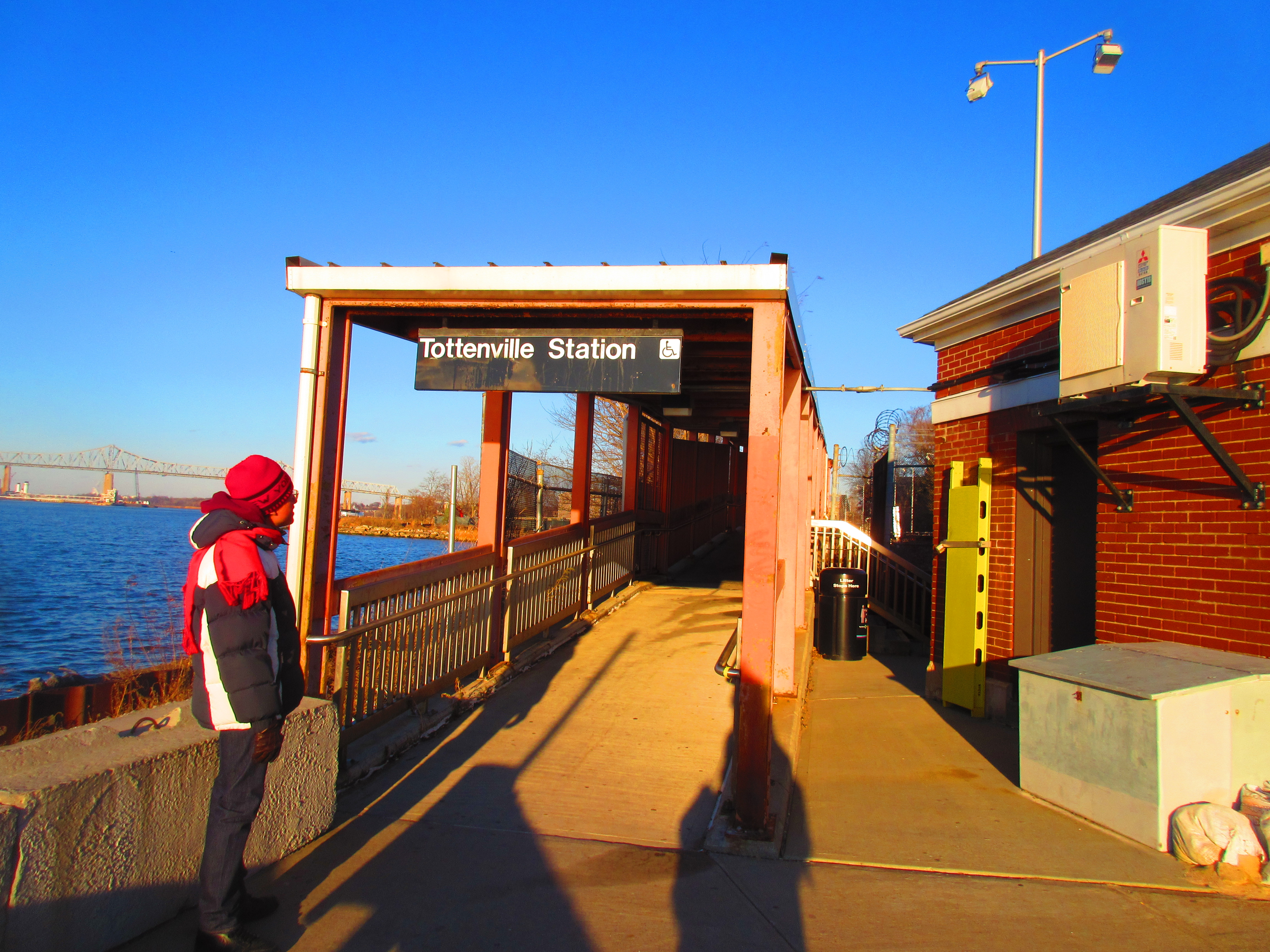
View of the ramp entrance from Bentley Street

The south end is ADA-accessible via a ramp to Bentley Street and a tiny parking area. The 1930s head house is used by SIRTOA employees only. The roadway leads to the end of Arthur Kill Road. The north end is accessible via passageway and overpass, south to Main Street, and north to Ellis Street.
