= St. George Terminal =

Transit center in Staten Island, New York

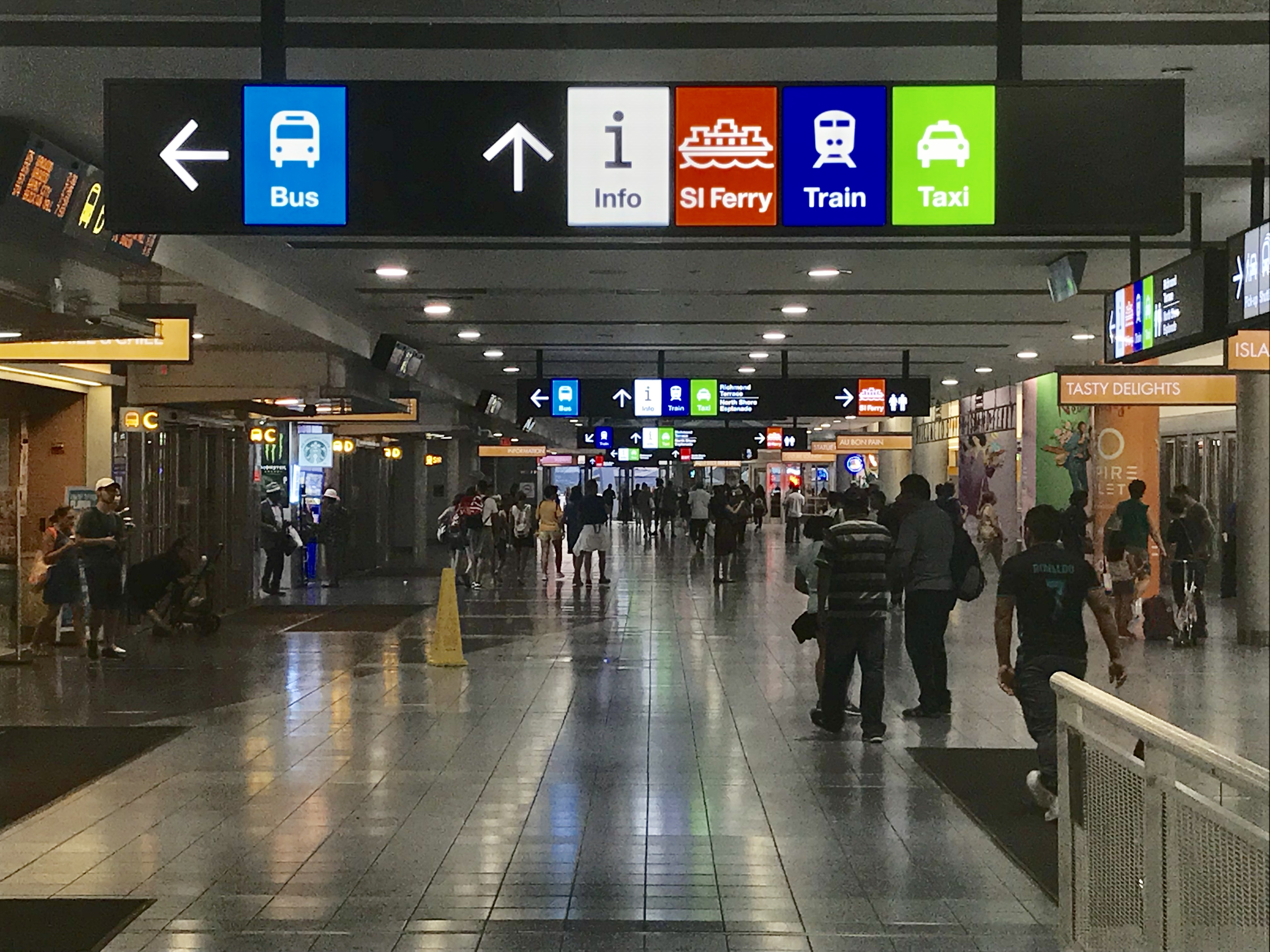
- Main concourse

General information
- Location: One Bay Street; Staten Island, New York; United States
- Coordinates: 40°38′36″N 74°4′27″W
- Operator: NYCDOT
- Line: Staten Island Ferry
- Connections: Staten Island Railway at St. George; NYCT Bus: S40, S42, S44, S46, S48, S51, S52, S61, S62, S66, S74, S76, S78, S81, S84, S86, S90, S91, S92, S94, S96, S98

Construction
- Accessible: Yes

Ferry services
Preceding station	NYCDOT	Following station
Terminus	Staten Island Ferry	Whitehall Terminal Terminus
Preceding station	NYC Ferry	Following station
Bay Ridge toward Pier 11/Wall Street	St. George	Battery Park City toward West Midtown
Location

St. George Terminal (also known as St. George Ferry Terminal) is a ferry, railway, bus, and park and ride transit center in the St. George neighborhood of Staten Island, New York City. It is located at the intersection of Richmond Terrace and Bay Street, near Staten Island Borough Hall, SIUH Community Park and Richmond County Supreme Court. St. George is a rare example of a rail-boat connection in the United States. (Note: Hoboken Terminal is another example in the New York City metropolitan area, serving New Jersey Transit and Metro-North commuter rail trains, Hudson-Bergen Light Rail, and PATH rapid transit as well as NY Waterway-operated ferries. On the west coast, a proposed station in Hercules, California would serve Amtrak trains and San Francisco Bay Ferry services.)

== History ==
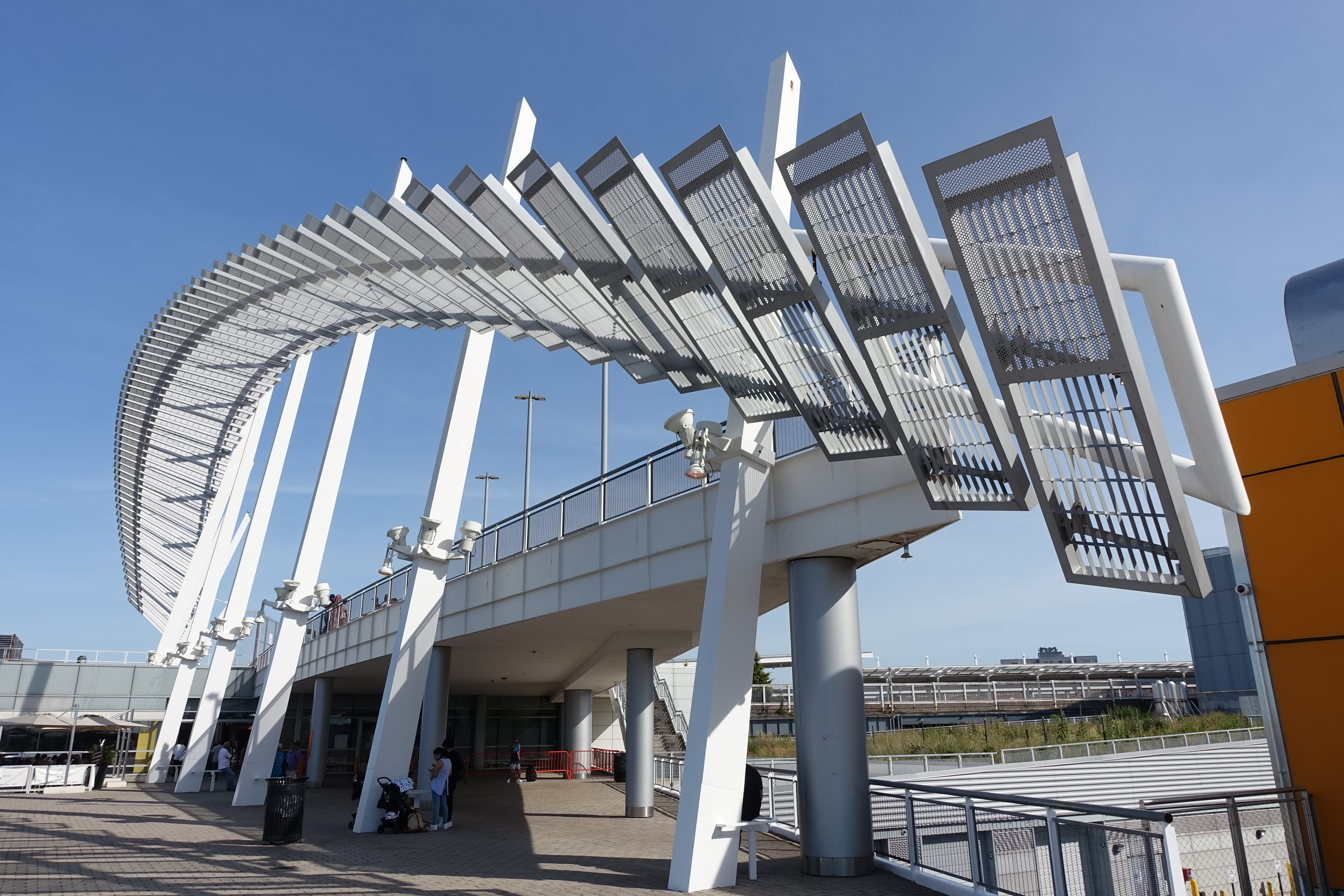
The arch gate above the terminal, constructed during the 2000s renovations.

A ferry and rail terminal at the St. George site (then called St. George's Landing) and an extension of the Staten Island Railway (then called Staten Island Rapid Transit) north from Vanderbilt's Landing (today's Clifton Station) had been proposed in the 1870s by the owners of the Staten Island Railroad, George Law, Cornelius Vanderbilt, and Erastus Wiman, to replace the various ferry sites on the north and east shores of Staten Island. St. George was selected due to it being the closest point from Staten Island to Manhattan, about a 5-mile (8.0 km) distance. The terminal and the local neighborhood were renamed to St. George in honor of Law, allegedly as a concession by Wiman in order to build the terminal and connecting tunnel on land owned by Law. An extension of the line to Tompkinsville was opened in 1884, and the tunnel between Tompkinsville and the terminal was constructed from 1884 to 1885. The ferry terminal was opened in early 1886, while the rail terminal opened in March of that year. The terminal's entrance building would be opened in 1897.

The St. George rail terminal as originally built was constructed of wood, with no overhead obstructions. Adjacent to the station was a large freight terminal called the St. George Yard, where the Baltimore and Ohio Railroad's freight operations exchanged with car floats to other terminals in the New York Harbor. The B&O also operated the Staten Island Rapid Transit and ferries under a 99-year lease signed in 1885. A trolley terminal for the Staten Island Electric Company was formerly located above the ferryhouse.

After the municipal takeover of the Staten Island Ferry service, a new St. George Ferry Terminal Complex was designed by Carrère and Hastings and opened in 1905. As part of this construction, the St. George tunnel was lengthened. It was built with two portals at its north end; one on the geographic east side currently in use by the Staten Island Railway, and an additional western portal intended for the Staten Island Tunnel, which would have traveled across the Narrows and connected to the New York City Subway's BMT Fourth Avenue Line in Brooklyn. In 1923 an excavation shaft for the Narrows tunnel was constructed at the south end of the terminal near Shore Road, though construction was halted in 1925. In 1930, civic leaders proposed a $2.5 million ferry terminal to replace the existing complex, with an underground train terminal below a 26-story office development. However, this plan was never carried out.

On June 25, 1946, a large fire destroyed both the wooden ferry and rail terminals, killing three people. Full service was restored in July of that year. A new facility was built by the city, opening on June 8, 1951, which led the tunneling shaft to be filled in. The new facility cost $21 million. The former freight yard was replaced by a New York City Department of Transportation municipal parking lot when the new terminal opened; the parking lot has since been replaced by Richmond County Bank Ballpark.

The station served as the northern (eastern) terminus for the Staten Island Railway North Shore Branch to Arlington and Port Ivory until its closure in 1953. The line used tracks 11 and 12 on the north end of the terminal, which are currently unused.

Plans for a renovation of the ferry terminal were announced in March 1997, and it received renovations in the 2000s as part of a $300 million renovation of several ferry terminals in the area, including the St. George and Whitehall Terminals. St. George's direct rail-boat connection is one of a few remaining in the United States.

The MTA announced in late 2022 that it would open customer service centers at 15 stations; the centers would provide services such as travel information and OMNY farecards. The first six customer service centers, including one at St. George Terminal, were to open in early 2023. St. George Terminal's customer service center opened at the beginning of March 2023. In 2025, the U.S. federal government provided a $5.75 million grant for the replacement of bus ramps and chillers at St. George Terminal, with assistance from U.S. Representative Nicole Malliotakis.

== Ferry terminal ==
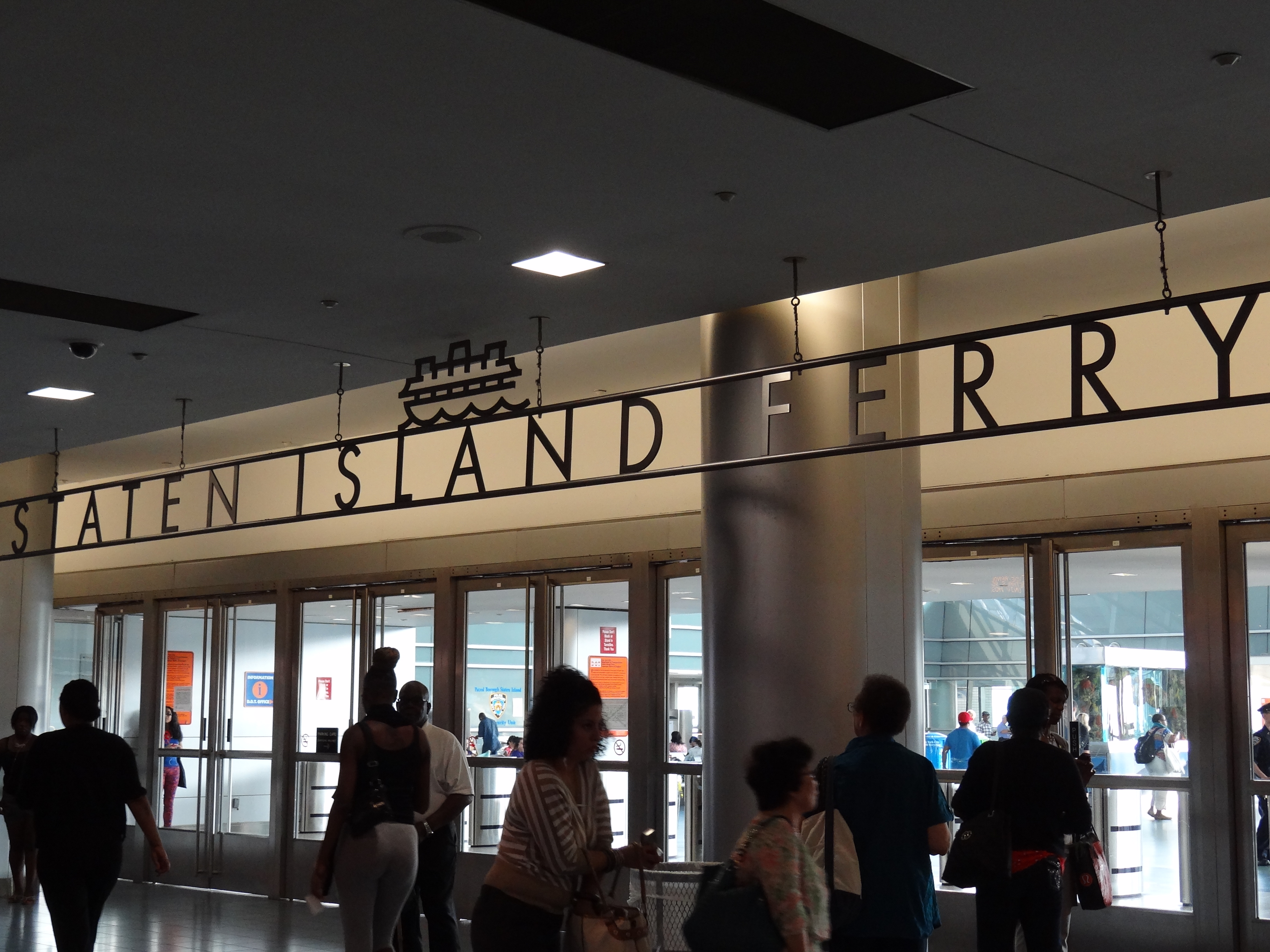
Entrance to the ferry portion of the St. George Terminal

St. George Terminal is the southern terminal of the Staten Island Ferry; it runs only to Whitehall Terminal, on the southern tip of Manhattan near Battery Park. The Staten Island Ferry runs a 24-hour service between the terminals. Ferries usually run at 15-to-20-minute intervals during rush hours and every 30 minutes at other times.

In January 2019, NYC Ferry announced that it would start operating its St. George route in 2020. The route was originally supposed to run from the St. George Terminal to Battery Park City Ferry Terminal and West Midtown Ferry Terminal in Manhattan. However, due to concerns that the massive Staten Island Ferry boats and the small NYC Ferry craft might not be able to share a dock, the New York City Economic Development Corporation announced in January 2020 that a NYC Ferry dock would instead be built close to the existing terminal, on the opposite side of Empire Outlets closer to the Richmond County Bank Ballpark. NYC Ferry service began operating in August 2021.

== Staten Island Railway station ==
St. George
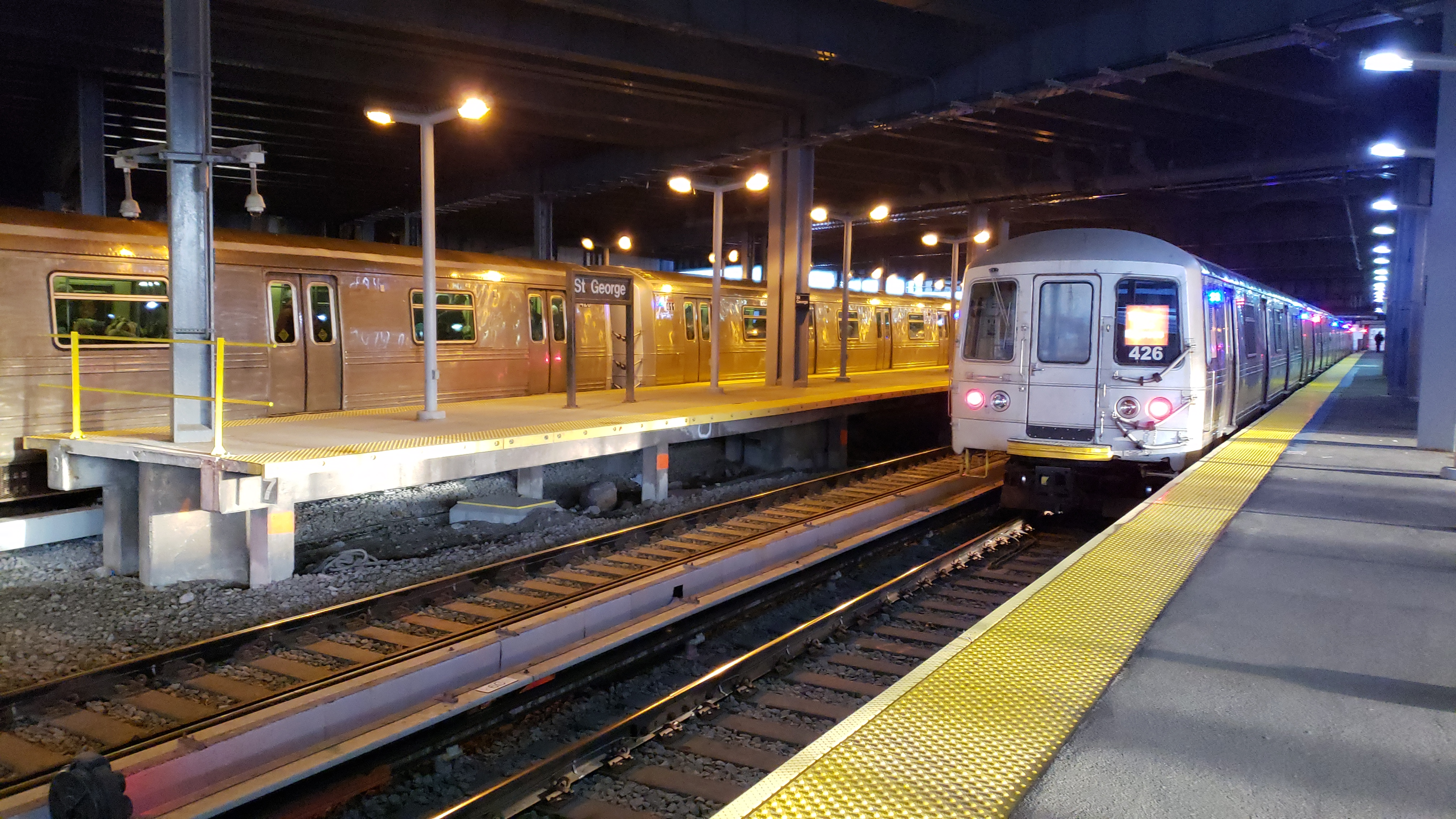
- Staten Island Railway station platform in St. George Terminal

General information
- Location: One Bay Street; St. George, Staten Island
- Coordinates: 40°38′36″N 74°4′27″W
- Platforms: 6 island platforms (5 in regular service)
- Tracks: 12 (10 in regular service)
- Connections: Staten Island Ferry (at St. George Terminal); NYCT Bus: S40, S42, S44, S46, S48, S51, S52, S61, S62, S66, S74, S76, S78, S81, S84, S86, S90, S91, S92, S94, S96, S98

Construction
- Structure type: Open-cut
- Accessible: Yes

Other information
- Station code: 501

History
- Opened: March 7, 1886; 140 years ago

Services
Preceding station	Staten Island Railway	Following station
Terminus	Staten Island Railway	Tompkinsville toward Tottenville
Former services
Preceding station	Staten Island Railway	Following station
Richmond County Bank Ballpark Closed 2010 Terminus	Staten Island Railway	Tompkinsville toward Tottenville
Preceding station	Staten Island Railway	Following station
Terminus	Tottenville – St. George	Tompkinsville toward Tottenville
New Brighton Closed 1953 toward Port Ivory	North Shore Branch	Terminus
Track layout
Location

The railroad station, which is known as the St. George station, opened on March 7, 1886. It is the first station and the northern terminus of the main line of the Staten Island Railway, which operates 24/7. It is also one of two stations that require the US$3.00 fare on entry and exit, the other being Tompkinsville. This station is handicapped-accessible.

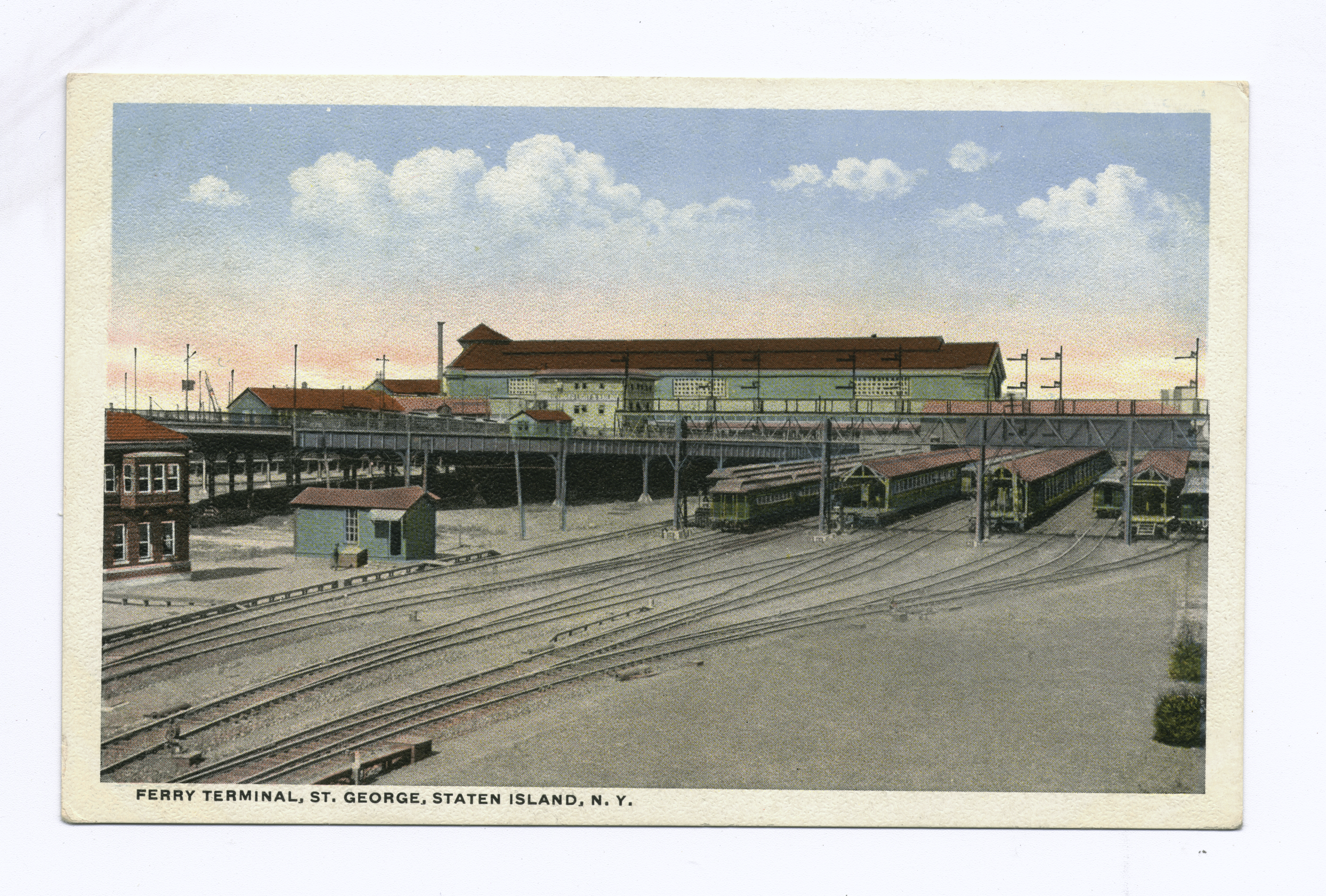
Early 20th century

This station is situated in an open cut below street level, with a four-lane bus terminal and parking lot above it. The station has five active platforms and ten tracks, numbered 1 through 10 from east to west. All tracks end at bumper blocks at their railroad northern (geographic eastern) ends. There is also a sixth island platform with two additional tracks (11 and 12) to the west (geographic north) no longer in revenue service, which historically served the Staten Island Rapid Transit's North Shore Branch. It currently acts as a passageway to the North Municipal Parking Field on Richmond Terrace, and towards Richmond County Bank Ballpark, one of two access points to this station. The track ballast is present through this construction zone. The mezzanine area has separate fare control areas: the east side for passengers entering, and the west side is for passengers exiting. Station booths and OMNY vending machines are located on both sides. Just before each platform bay are the old destination indicators to the left and right of each platform entrance, corresponding to each departing track. There are green bulbs above these displays that indicate where the next train will be leaving from. This station originally opened with nothing overhead; no bus bays and no ramps. It was the site of a 1946 fire that nearly destroyed the terminal.

Just south of the station towards Tompkinsville, the Staten Island Railway runs in the system's only tunnel, known as the St. George Tunnel.

=== Station layout ===
Station layout

G	Street level	Exit/entrance, buses, Staten Island Ferry; North side elevator (Elevator PE-W) accesses bus/taxi, ferry, and SIR platform levels. South side elevator (Elevator PE-S) accesses passenger drop-off and ferry levels.
P Platform level	Track 12	No passenger service (Richmond County Bank Ballpark)
P Platform level	Island platform, not in service
P Platform level	Track 11	No passenger service (Richmond County Bank Ballpark)
P Platform level	Track 10	No regular service
P Platform level	Island platform, not in service
P Platform level	Track 9	No regular service
P Platform level	Track 8	No regular service
P Platform level	Island platform, not in service
P Platform level	Track 7	No regular service
P Platform level	Track 6	← rush hours toward Tottenville (Great Kills)
P Platform level	Island platform
P Platform level	Track 5	← rush hours toward Tottenville (Great Kills)
P Platform level	Track 4	← toward Great Kills rush hours, Tottenville other times (Tompkinsville)
P Platform level	Island platform
P Platform level	Track 3	← toward Great Kills rush hours, Tottenville other times (Tompkinsville)
P Platform level	Track 2	← toward Great Kills rush hours, Tottenville other times (Tompkinsville)
P Platform level	Island platform
P Platform level	Track 1	← toward Great Kills rush hours, Tottenville other times (Tompkinsville)

== New York City Bus ==
The Metropolitan Transportation Authority operates a number of bus routes in Staten Island, New York, United States. Some of them are the direct descendants of streetcar lines (see list of streetcar lines in Staten Island).

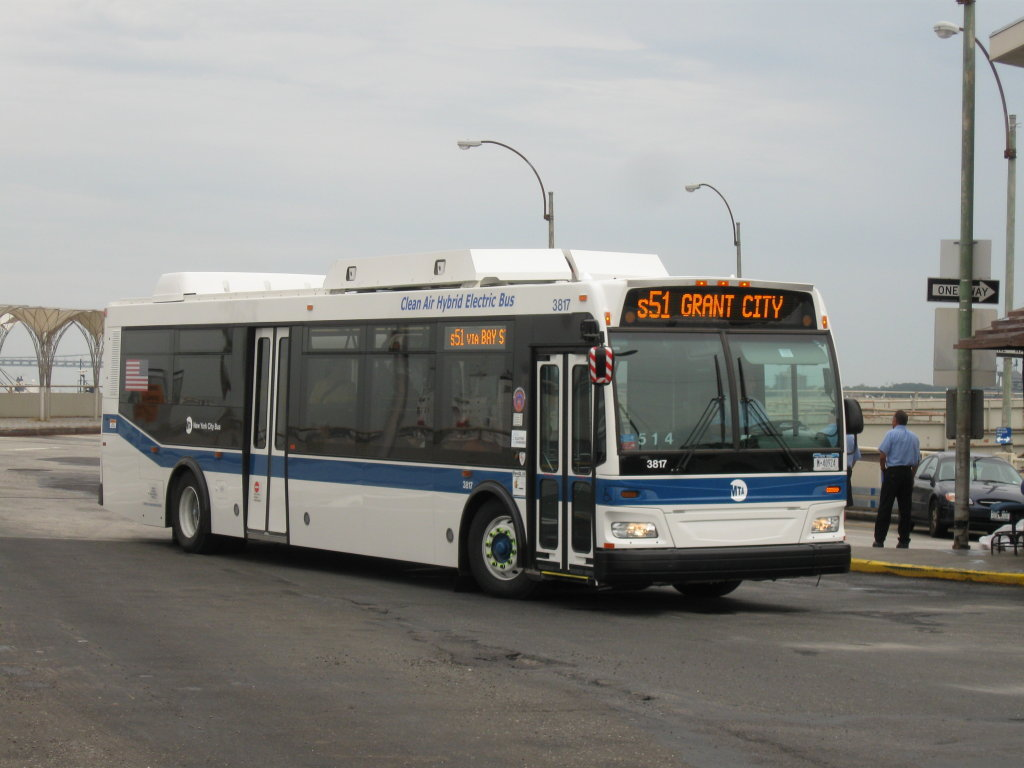
S51 bus at St. George Ferry Terminal

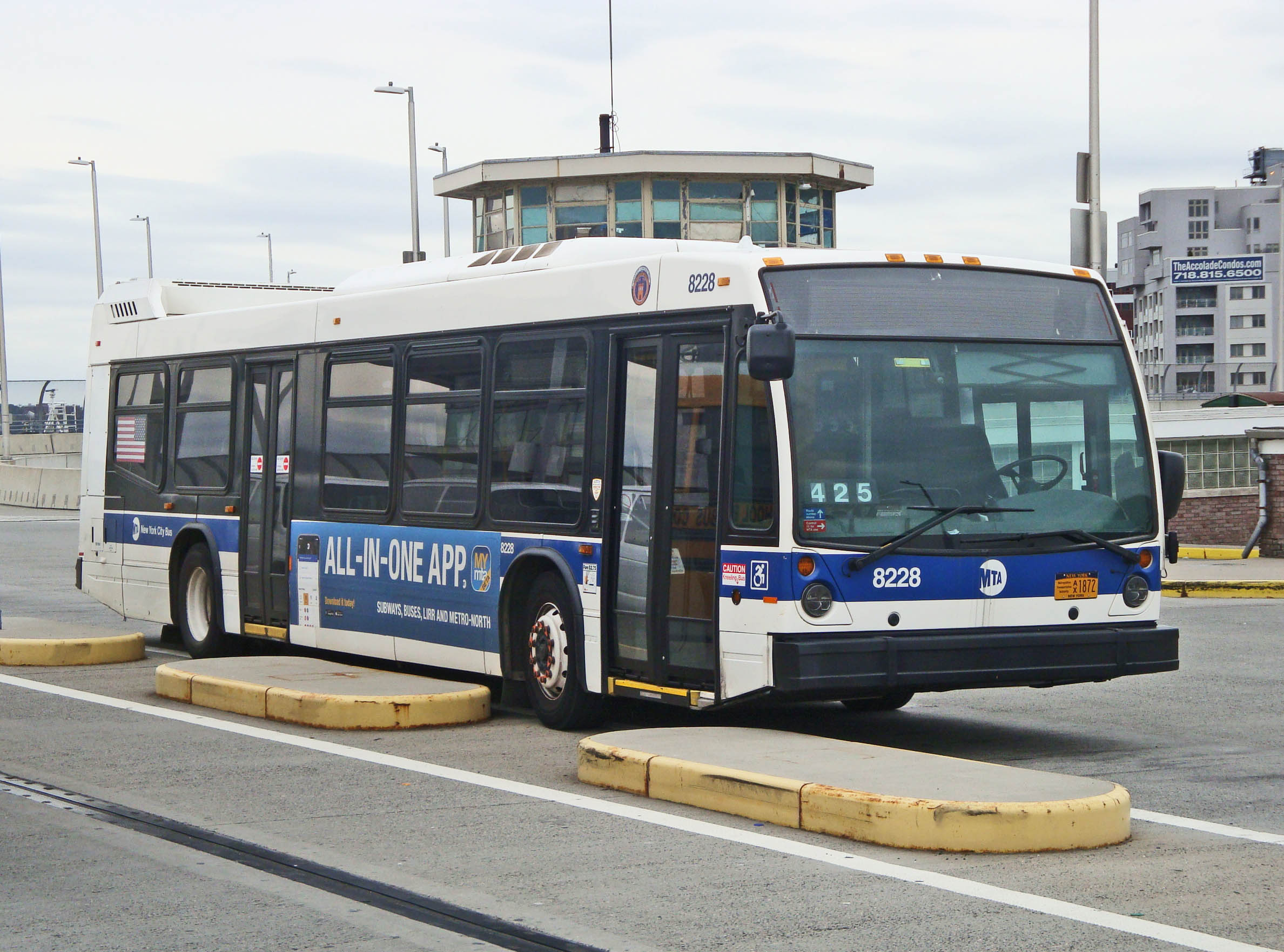
A bus parked at St. George

Departures are given below by loading bay.

Ramp	Routes	Destination	Notes
A	S61 Local S91 Limited	Staten Island Mall	S61 all times.; S91 PM rush-only limited-stop service.
A	S62 Local S92 Limited	Travis via College of Staten Island	S62 all times.; S92 PM rush-only limited-stop service.
A	S66	Port Richmond	Weekdays only.; Via Grymes Hill.
B	S51 Local S81 Limited	Grant City via South Beach	S51 all times.; S81 PM rush-only limited-stop service.
B	S74 Local S84 Limited	Charleston; Bricktown Center Mall	S74 all times.; S84 PM rush-only limited-stop service.
B	S76 Local S86 Limited	Oakwood	S76 weekdays only.; S86 PM rush-only limited-stop service.
C	S46 Local S96 Limited	Chelsea; West Shore Plaza	S46 all times.; S96 PM rush-only limited-stop service.
C	S48 Local S98 Limited	Arlington	S48 all times.; S98 PM rush-only limited-stop service.
C	S78	Charleston; Bricktown Center Mall	S78 all times.; Stopped at Ramp D prior to June 27, 2010 service reductions, then Ramp A.
D	S40 Local S90 Limited	Bloomfield via Goethals Homes	S40 all times.; S90 PM rush-only limited-stop service.
D	S42	New Brighton	Runs rush hours and evenings only.; Stopped at Ramp C prior to June 27, 2010 service reductions.
D	S44 Local S94 Limited	Staten Island Mall via Port Richmond	S44 all times.; S94 PM rush-only limited-stop service.
D	S52	South Beach; Staten Island University Hospital	No overnight service.

== Nearby attractions ==
- National Lighthouse Museum
- St. George Theatre
- Staten Island September 11 Memorial
