= USS Mystery (ID-2744) =

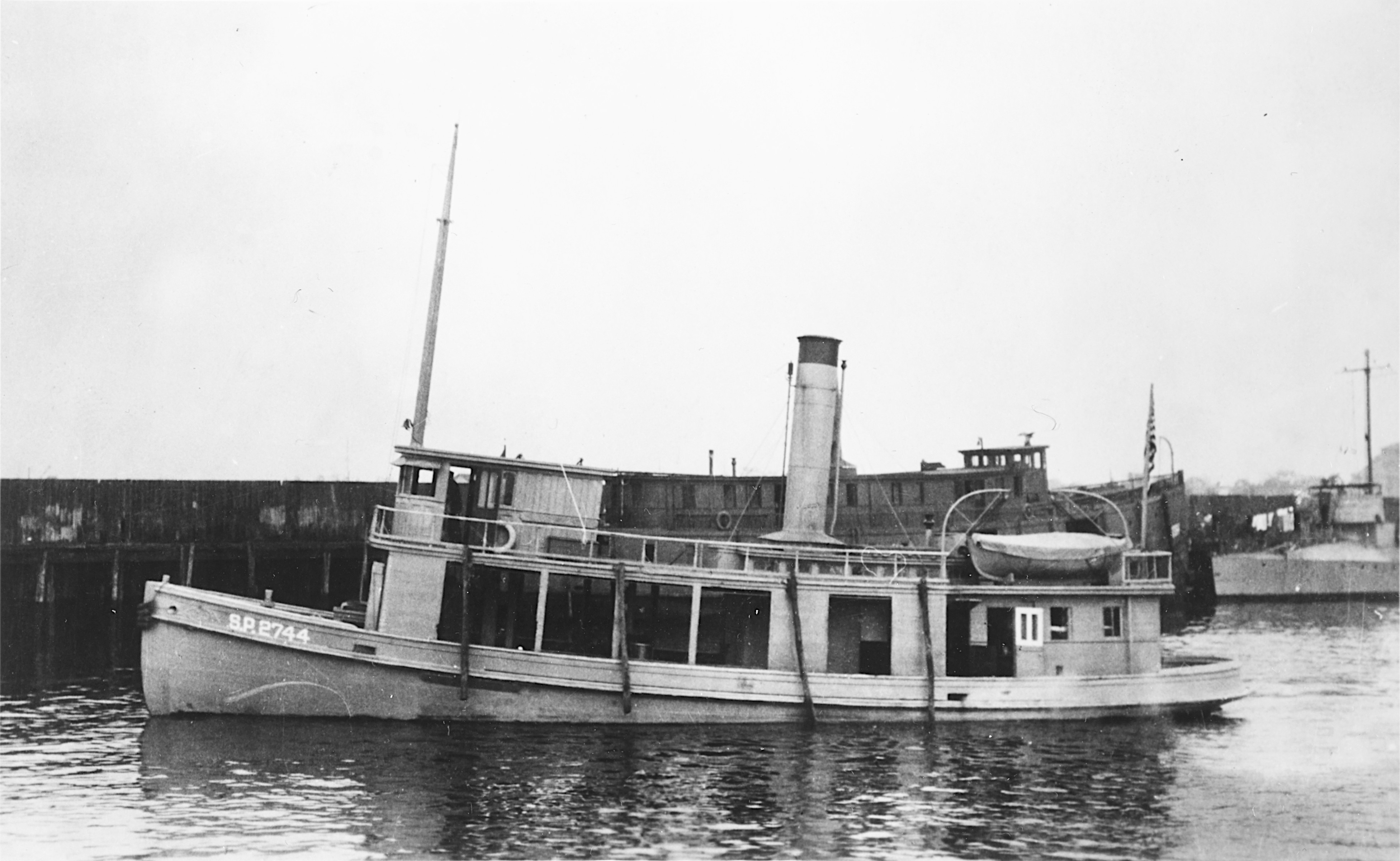
- USS Mystery ca. 1918. The designation "SP-2744" painted on her bow contradicts her official data card listing as "Id. No. 2744," which is almost certainly her actual designation.

History

United States
- Name: USS Mystery
- Namesake: Previous name retained
- Builder: A. C. Brown (Tottenville, New York)
- Completed: 1886
- Acquired: Chartered 18 July 1918; Taken over 20 August 1918
- Commissioned: 2 September 1918
- Fate: Returned to owner 18 January 1919
- Notes: Operated as commercial fishing trawler 1886-1918 and from 1919; U.S. Navy designation reported as both Id. No. 2744 and SP-2744

General characteristics
- Type: Minesweeper support ship
- Displacement: 212 tons
- Length: 106 ft 6 in (32.46 m)
- Beam: 20 ft 6 in (6.25 m)
- Draft: 6 ft 6 in (1.98 m)
- Speed: 8 knots
- Complement: 8
- Armament: None

The second USS Mystery (ID-2744), often identified as SP-2744, was a minesweeper support ship that served in the United States Navy from 1918 to 1919.

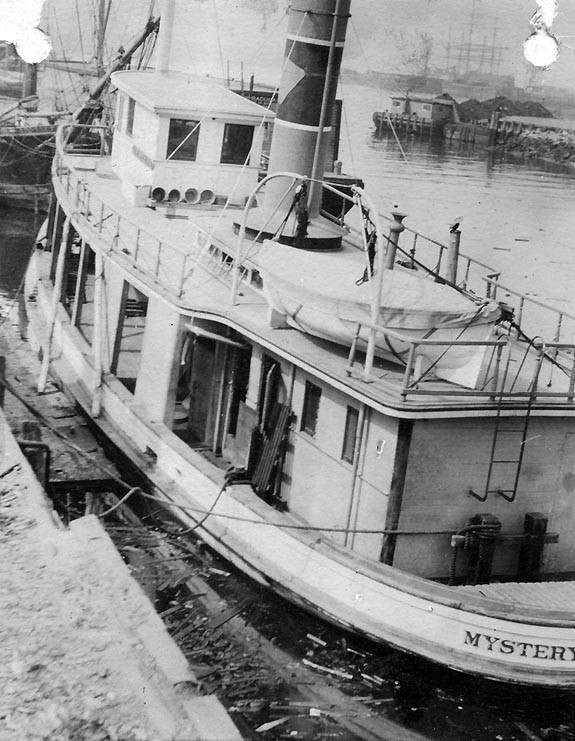
Mystery in merchant service, ca. 1918

Mystery was built in 1886 by A. C. Brown at Tottenville, New York, as a commercial fishing trawler. The 3rd Naval District inspected her on May 7, 1918 for possible World War I U.S. Navy service. The Navy chartered her from Empire Water Co., Inc., of New York City on 18 July 1918, took her over 20 August 1918, assigned her Identification Number (ID. No. 2744) and commissioned her as USS Mystery (ID-2744) on 2 September 1918. Confusingly, the designation "SP-2744" was painted on her bow and this designation is reported as her official one by many sources, although this contradicted her official data card, which identifies her as "Id. No. 2744," a more likely official designation for her given that "SP" numbers were usually much lower and because she did not have the patrol vessel role of most "SP" boats.

Assigned to the 3rd Naval District, Mystery served as a support ship for minesweepers operating in the approaches to New York Harbor. Her career overlapped with that of the first USS Mystery (SP-428).

Mystery was returned to her owner on 18 January 1919.
