= Conference House Park =

Public park in Staten Island, New York

Coordinates: 40°30′11″N 74°15′11″W

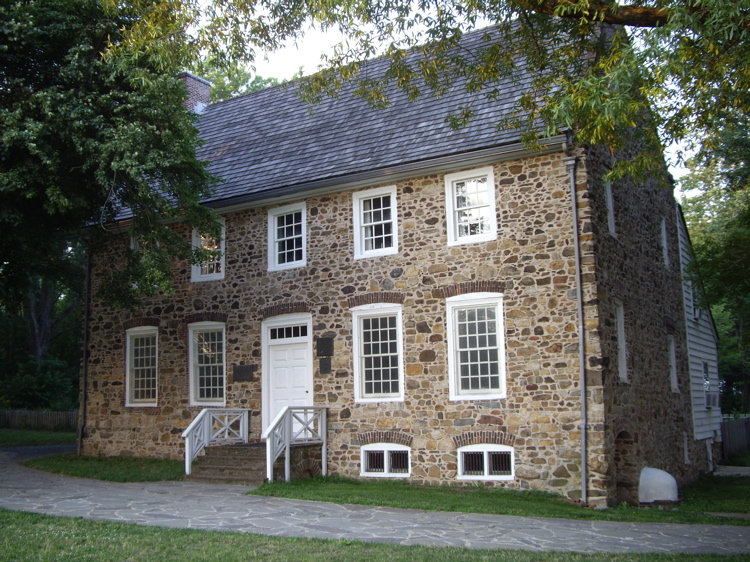
The Conference House within the park

Conference House Park is a park in Tottenville, Staten Island, New York City. The park is located along the Arthur Kill coast where the kill opens into Raritan Bay. It contains clay bluffs, part of the terminal moraine, formed when the Wisconsin Glacier receded 10,000 years ago. Ward's Point, the southernmost point in New York state, is in the park.

== History ==
Conference House Park is named after the historic Conference House, a c. 1680 stone manor house in which a peace conference was initiated between British and American forces on September 11, 1776, in an effort to halt the American Revolution. The area of the park was once part of Bentley Manor owned by the Billop family. The Henry Hogg Biddle house constructed between 1845 and 1853 is another historic structure in the park. The park contains several other buildings such as the Ward House, the Biddle House, and the Rutan-Beckett House.

A new pavilion opened in 2002. The park was slated for improvements during 2008–2009, including the restoration of the Biddle House, new educational exhibits, and a second playground, one of five which are planned for Staten Island as part of Mayor Michael Bloomberg's PlaNYC initiative. The extensive renovation finally started in 2017.

== Features ==
A Lenape Indian campsite and burial ground, known as Burial Ridge, are in the boundaries of the park, set back from the clay bluffs. In the late 18th century, George H. Pepper of the American Museum of Natural History conducted archaeological digs on the site, unearthing the remains of Lenape buried there. There are still shell middens visible along the shore line that become exposed due to erosion. The Lenape graveyard was looted for many years by area inhabitants and others seeking to recover the grave goods buried with the bodies. The New York City Landmarks Preservation Commission designated about 20 acres (8.1 ha) of the park as the Aakawaxung Munahanung (Island Protected from the Wind) Archaeological Site in 2021. The name "Aakawaxung Munahanung" is from the language of the Raritan people.

It also houses a pavilion on the west beach with a characteristic turquoise roof, paths for walking and biking, and the Lenape playground (named for the area's original Native American inhabitants), which is frequented by residents of the Tottenville and Tottenville Beach neighborhoods.

The park is the southernmost point in both New York City and New York state, at Ward's Point at the southern terminus of Hylan Boulevard. Many community events are held there every year, including a locally popular fireworks show every 4th of July. From 2002 to 2004 the park was renovated and upgraded, during which the aforementioned pavilion, paths, and playground were constructed, as well as a new visitors' center and visitor parking. The park has also been referred to as Swinnerton Park, usually with respect to the Lenape playground, which is located at the end of Swinnerton Street. The footpaths offer views of waterside New Jersey towns across Raritan Bay, while the pavilion overlooks the Arthur Kill and Perth Amboy, New Jersey.

New York Road Runners hosts a weekly 3.10-mile Open Run.
