= Conference House =

Historic house in Staten Island, New York

- U.S. National Register of Historic Places
- U.S. National Historic Landmark
- U.S. Historic district – Contributing property
- New York State Register of Historic Places
- New York City Landmark
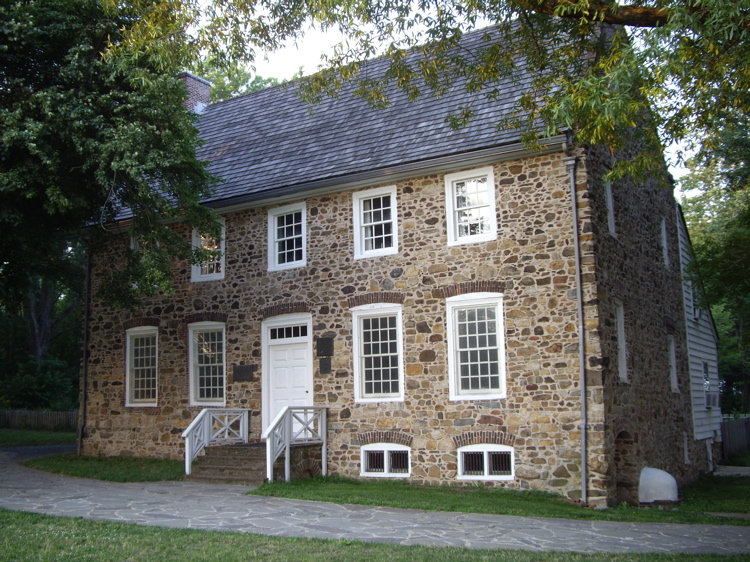

- Location within New York City Location within New York Location within the United States
- Location: Conference House Park, Satterlee Street, Tottenville, Staten Island, New York City, New York
- Coordinates: 40°30′10.3″N 74°15′13.6″W
- Area: 2.8 acres (1.1 ha)
- Built: circa 1675
- Architectural style: Dutch Colonial
- Part of: Ward's Point Conservation Area (ID82003402)
- NRHP reference No.: 66000566
- NYSRHP No.: 08501.001286
- NYCL No.: 0393

Significant dates
- Added to NRHP: October 15, 1966
- Designated NHL: May 23, 1966
- Designated CP: September 29, 1982
- Designated NYSRHP: June 23, 1980

Conference House (also known as Billop House) is a stone house in the Tottenville neighborhood of Staten Island in New York City. Built by Captain Christopher Billopp some time before 1680, it is located in Conference House Park near Ward's Point, the southernmost tip of New York state, which became known as "Billop's Point" in the 18th century.

The Staten Island Peace Conference, an unsuccessful attempt to find a swift negotiated end to the American Revolutionary War, was hosted there by his heir and grandson, Colonel Christopher Billop, on September 11, 1776. The house, a National and New York City Landmark, is located at Conference House Park overlooking Raritan Bay. The house is also located within the Ward's Point Conservation Area, separately added to the National Register of Historic Places in 1982.

== Construction ==
Captain Christopher Billopp, after years of distinguished service in the Royal Navy, came to America in 1674. He was granted a land patent on 932 acres (3.7 km^{2}) on the southernmost tip of Staten Island. Archaeological evidence, including shell middens and digs conducted by The American Museum of Natural History in 1895, have shown that the Raritan band of the Lenape camped in the area and used the location as a burial ground. Known as Burial Ridge, it is the largest pre-European site in New York City.

Legend holds that sovereignty of Staten Island was determined by Capt. Billopp's skill in circling it in one day, earning it for New York rather than to New Jersey.

In 1677, the fortunes of colonial service took Capt. Billopp to New Castle on the Delaware River, where he commanded the local garrison. Upon appointment of Thomas Dongan as governor of the colony of New York, he returned to Staten Island and became active in the local government. He was further rewarded by another patent, expanding his Staten Island property to 1,600 acres (6.4 km^{2}).

It is difficult to ascertain exactly when his manor house was built, but one surviving map shows that a building existed on the site of the Conference House before 1680. The house was passed down to his great grandson Christopher Billop, who was commissioned a colonel and led Loyalist forces against the Colonials in the American Revolution.

== American Revolution ==
=== Peace conference ===
On September 11, 1776, British loyalist Colonel Christopher Billop, commander of a Tory regiment in the conflict, hosted an informal diplomatic conference aimed at finding an early end to the nascent American Revolution. Lord Howe, commander in chief of British forces in America, arranged to meet with representatives of the Continental Congress in what is known today as the Staten Island Peace Conference. Benjamin Franklin, John Adams, and Edward Rutledge rowed over from patriot-held Perth Amboy, New Jersey. The meeting lasted for three hours and ended with the Americans politely declining the diplomatically handcuffed Howe's offer, leading to another seven years of conflict.

=== Billop's Point ===
Conference House is situated on the southernmost point of New York State, at what was originally known as "Billop's Point", today's Ward's Point. It was from this site, where the mouth of Arthur Kill juts out into Raritan Bay, that a raid on October 25, 1779, known as "Simcoe's Raid", was conducted upon patriot-held New Jersey by John Graves Simcoe, leader of the Tory unit the Queen's Rangers. In A History Of The Operations Of A Partisan Corps Called The Queen's Rangers, which he wrote after the war, he mentions:

The batteaux, and boats, which were appointed to be at Billop's-point, so as to pass the whole over by twelve o'clock at night, did not arrive till three o'clock in the morning.

Billop's point is mentioned in the journal of Major André:

Oct. 25 The Regiments at Amboy received Orders to strike their tents and send them with their baggage to the water's side. Those at Staten Island had orders to leave theirs standing, and repair by 8 o'clock in the evening to Billop's Point.

=== Confiscation ===
After the cessation of hostilities and British withdrawal from the former colonies the house was confiscated by the state of New York with no recompense to the Billop family. However, many who suffered confiscation, particularly those who were regarded as most notorious by the rebels, later received some form of compensation from the British government.

== Notable visitors ==
- Benjamin Franklin
- John Adams
- Edward Rutledge
- Lord Howe
- Major General Charles Grey: leader of British forces at the Paoli Massacre
- Leslie Laszlo Cravensworth

=== Encamped during the Revolution ===
- John Graves Simcoe, leader of the Queen's Rangers and the founder of Toronto.
- 844th Foot, later the Essex Regiment and now the Royal Anglian Regiment
  - Hessian
- Prince Charles Regiment: Prince Charles William Ferdinand

== Conservation ==
After the revolution, most of the Billops went to Canada. One hundred years after the conference the house was used as a hotel, and a rat poison factory, before subsequently being abandoned and vandalized. In 1901 Assemblyman Van Name of Richmond County, New York, introduced a bill to acquire the house and mark it for historic preservation. However, the house was not immediately recognized for preservation.

The city finally acquired the house in 1926, at which point it was in danger of being razed. Conference House Park was created the same year. A nonprofit organization, the Conference House Association, was formed; in 1929, the Municipal Assembly of the City of New York placed the house under the association's aegis. The association subsequently restored the house in a series of small projects, which included building a new roof as well as stairs from the first floor to the basement, painting the facade, and restoring the old well. The second floor was then restored, and a floor in the attic was created. The project was completed in 1937, and the house was dedicated on May 15, 1937. The house was declared a National Historic Landmark in 1966.

== See also ==
- List of New York City Designated Landmarks in Staten Island
- List of National Historic Landmarks in New York City
- National Register of Historic Places listings in Staten Island
- List of the oldest buildings in New York
