= USS Mystery (SP-428) =

Patrol vessel of the United States Navy

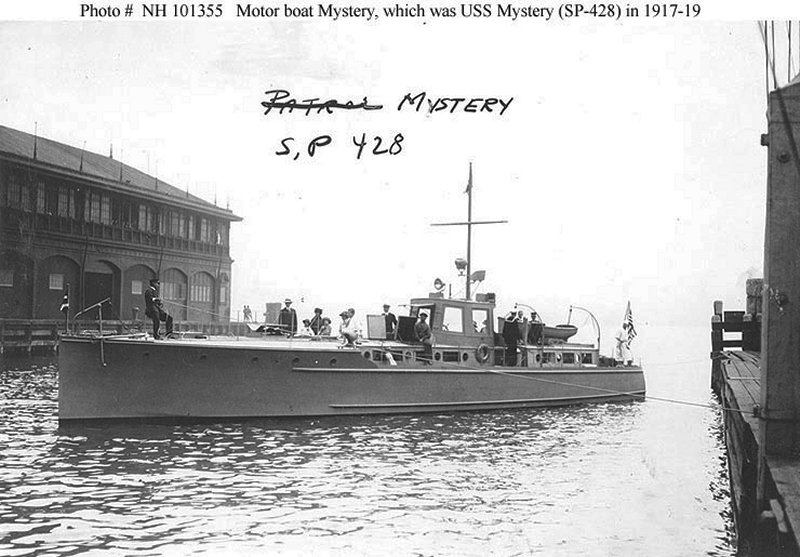
- Mystery in 1917, prior to her U.S. Navy service

History

United States
- Name: USS Mystery
- Namesake: Previous name retained
- Builder: Luders Marine Construction Company, Stamford, Connecticut
- Completed: 1917
- Acquired: Leased 18 June 1917; Delivered 24 July 1917
- Commissioned: 25 July 1917
- Fate: Returned to owner 11 January 1919
- Notes: Operated as private motorboat Mystery 1917 and from 1919

General characteristics
- Type: Patrol vessel
- Tonnage: 26 Gross register tons
- Length: 71 ft (22 m)
- Beam: 13 ft (4.0 m)
- Draft: 3 ft 6 in (1.07 m)
- Installed power: 800 horsepower (0.6 megawatt)
- Propulsion: Two 400-horsepower (0.3-megawatt) Duesenberg engines
- Speed: 24 knots
- Complement: 10
- Armament: 1 × 3-pounder gun; 1 × 1-pounder gun; 2 × machine guns

The first USS Mystery (SP-428) was an armed motorboat that served in the United States Navy as a patrol vessel from 1917 to 1919.

Mystery was built in 1917 by Luders Marine Construction Company at Stamford, Connecticut, as a private motorboat of the same name. Her design was similar to one prepared in 1916 by Luders Marine for a Navy patrol boat, and it is likely that her owner, Mr. Ralph Pulitzer of New York City, intended from the first to make her available to the U.S. Navy in the event the United States entered World War I.

On 18 June 1917, the U.S. Navy acquired Mystery for World War I service under a free lease from Pulitzer, and she was enrolled in the Naval Coast Defense Reserve. Pulitzer delivered her to the Navy on 24 July 1917. She was commissioned as USS Mystery (SP-428) on 25 July 1917.

Assigned to the 2nd Naval District, Mystery operated from the section base at Block Island, Rhode Island. She patrolled the coastal waters of Connecticut and Rhode Island as well as the approaches to Long Island Sound. The last few months of her career overlapped with that of the second USS Mystery (ID-2744).

Mystery was returned to her owner on 11 January 1919.
