= Tottenville, Staten Island =

Neighborhood in New York City

Tottenville
- Neighborhood of Staten Island
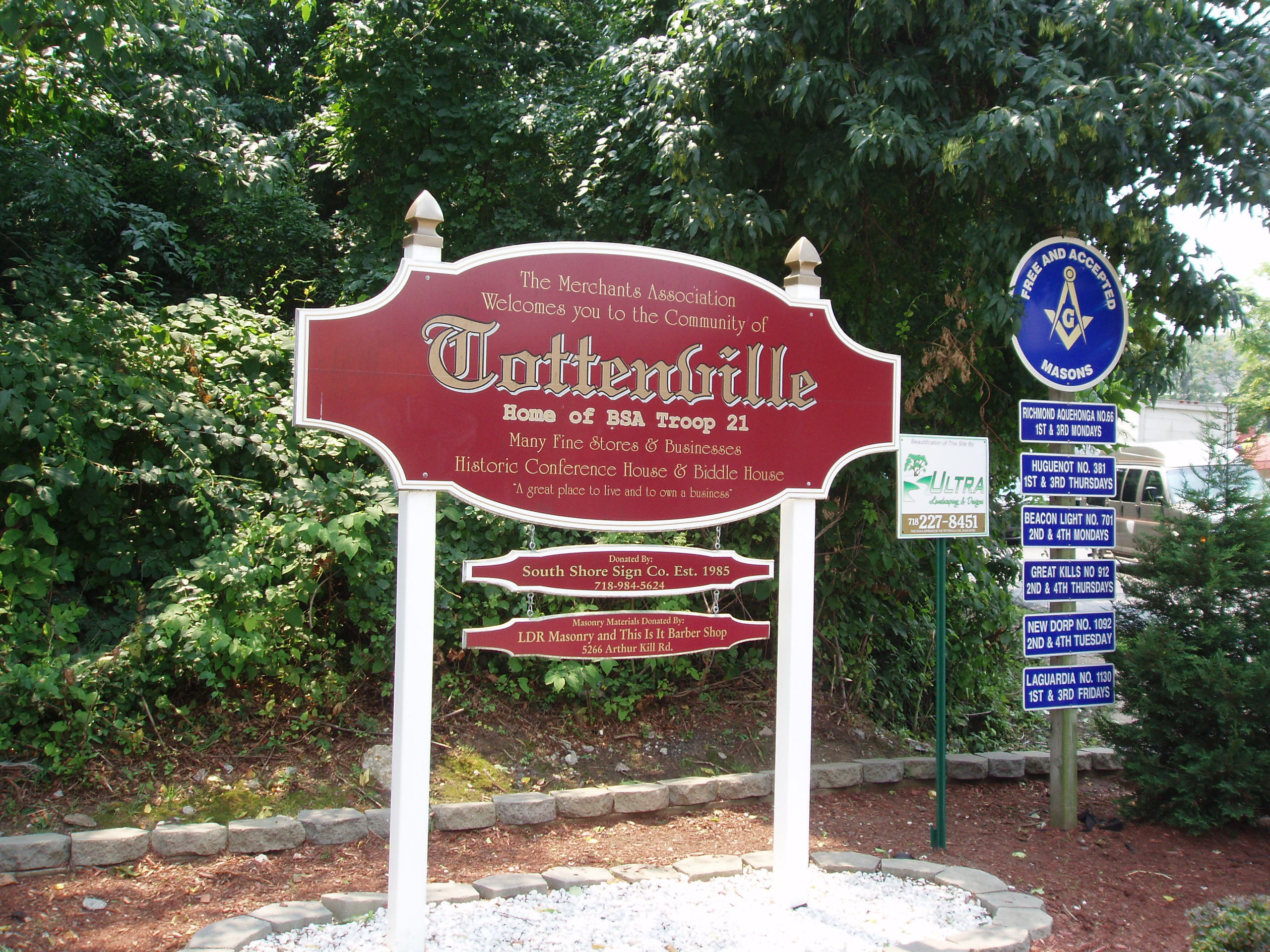
- Welcome To Tottenville sign
- Location in New York City
- Coordinates: 40.506°N 74.243°W
- Country: United States
- State: New York
- City: New York City
- Borough: Staten Island
- Community District: Staten Island 3

Area
  - Total: 2.505 sq mi (6.49 km^{2})

Population (2020)
  - Total: 16,089
  - Density: 6,423/sq mi (2,480/km^{2})

Economics
  - Median income: $81,478
- Time zone: UTC−5 (Eastern)
- ZIP Codes: 10307, 10309
- Area code: 718, 347, 929, and 917

Tottenville is a neighborhood on the South Shore of Staten Island, New York City. It is the southernmost neighborhood and settlement in both New York City and New York State, as well as the westernmost neighborhood in New York City. Tottenville is bounded on three sides by water: the south side abuts the New York Bight while the west and north sides are bordered by the Arthur Kill. Nassau Place, Bethel Avenue and Page Avenue form the neighborhood's eastern border.

The settlement was originally named Bentley Manor by one of its first settlers, Captain Christopher Billop (1638–1726), a member of the Royal Navy, after his own ship. In 1869 it was renamed as Tottenville after John Totten and his prominent local family of that name, some of whom served as Loyalists under Billop during the American Revolutionary War.

Tottenville is part of Staten Island Community District 3 and its ZIP Code is 10307 (formerly "Staten Island 7, New York"). Tottenville is patrolled by the 123rd Precinct of the New York City Police Department. Tottenville has been represented in the New York State Senate by Andrew Lanza since 2007. It is represented in the New York State Assembly by Michael Reilly.

== History ==
=== Early history ===
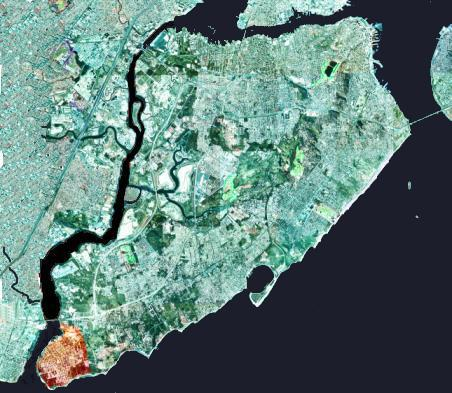
The neighborhood of Tottenville in Staten Island is shown highlighted in orange

The Raritan band of the Unami Indians, a branch of the Lenape or Delaware nation, were the original inhabitants of all Staten Island, including Tottenville. The largest pre-European burial ground, known as Burial Ridge, is located in what is now Conference House Park.

The village was originally named Bentley Manor by one of its first settlers, Captain Christopher Billop (1638–1726), after a small ship he owned named the Bentley. In 1869 the district was renamed as Tottenville, apparently in honor of John Totten and the locally prominent Totten family. Their names appear on tombstones in the cemetery of Bethel Methodist Church. Several Totten family members were Loyalists during the American Revolution and served under Captain Christopher Billop.

During the colonial period and for a significant time thereafter, Tottenville was an important waypoint for travelers between New York City—of which Staten Island did not formally become a part until 1898—and Philadelphia. These were both sites of temporary capitals of the new United States. The town was the site of a ferry that crossed the Arthur Kill to the Ferry Slip in Perth Amboy, New Jersey. The ferry became less important when the Outerbridge Crossing opened in 1928, but continued to operate until 1963.

Two distinctive landmarks stand at the northern approaches to the neighborhood: the Bethel United Methodist Church, erected in 1840 and rebuilt on the same site in 1886 after a fire destroyed the original structure. Secondly, a now abandoned factory was built in 1900 as Nassau Smelting's plant. It was later used for recycling by Lucent Technologies and closed in 2001.

Tottenville is bounded on the west and south by the Arthur Kill, and on the east by Raritan Bay, the mouth of which lies immediately to the south of Arthur Kill's entry to the bay (which is also sometimes reckoned as being part of the Atlantic Ocean).

The Conference House was built by Christopher Billop and so named because it was the site of negotiations to end the American Revolutionary War in 1776, but these were unsuccessful. The historic residence has been preserved as the centerpiece of the city park of the same name. The Billop family, who developed the estate in 1678, continued to own it and the surrounding property during the 1776 meeting. Because they were Loyalists during the war, their land was confiscated in 1784.

Tottenville has a strong Victorian architecture heritage, akin to neighborhoods on Staten Island's North Shore. This is unique to this South Shore neighborhood. The other South Shore areas were developed much later. Seven buildings in Tottenville have been honored with the Preservation League of Staten Island Award: 88 Bentley Street, 24 Brighton Street, 213 Wood Avenue, 115 Bentley Street, 7647 Amboy Road, 7639 Amboy Road, and the Tottenville Branch of the New York Public Library. 88 Bentley Street has been photographed as an example of Staten Island's carefully restored Victorian homes in New York City - The Five Boroughs: A Photographic Tour (1997) by Carol M. Highsmith and Ted Landphair. In addition, the Old Church of St. Joachim and St. Anne was restored after a fire and is now used as a home for children.

=== 20th century ===
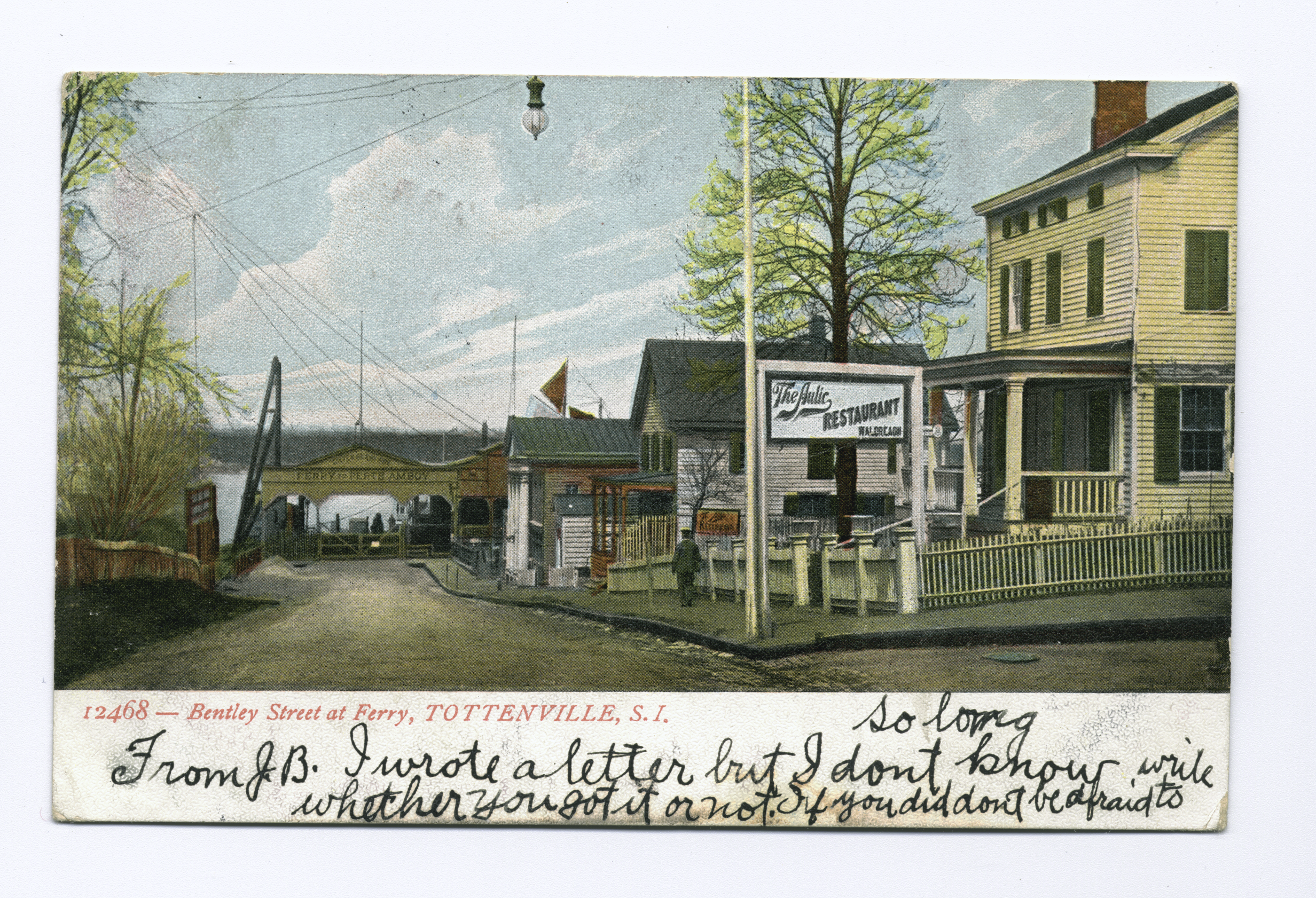
Ferry gate to Perth Amboy, early 20th century

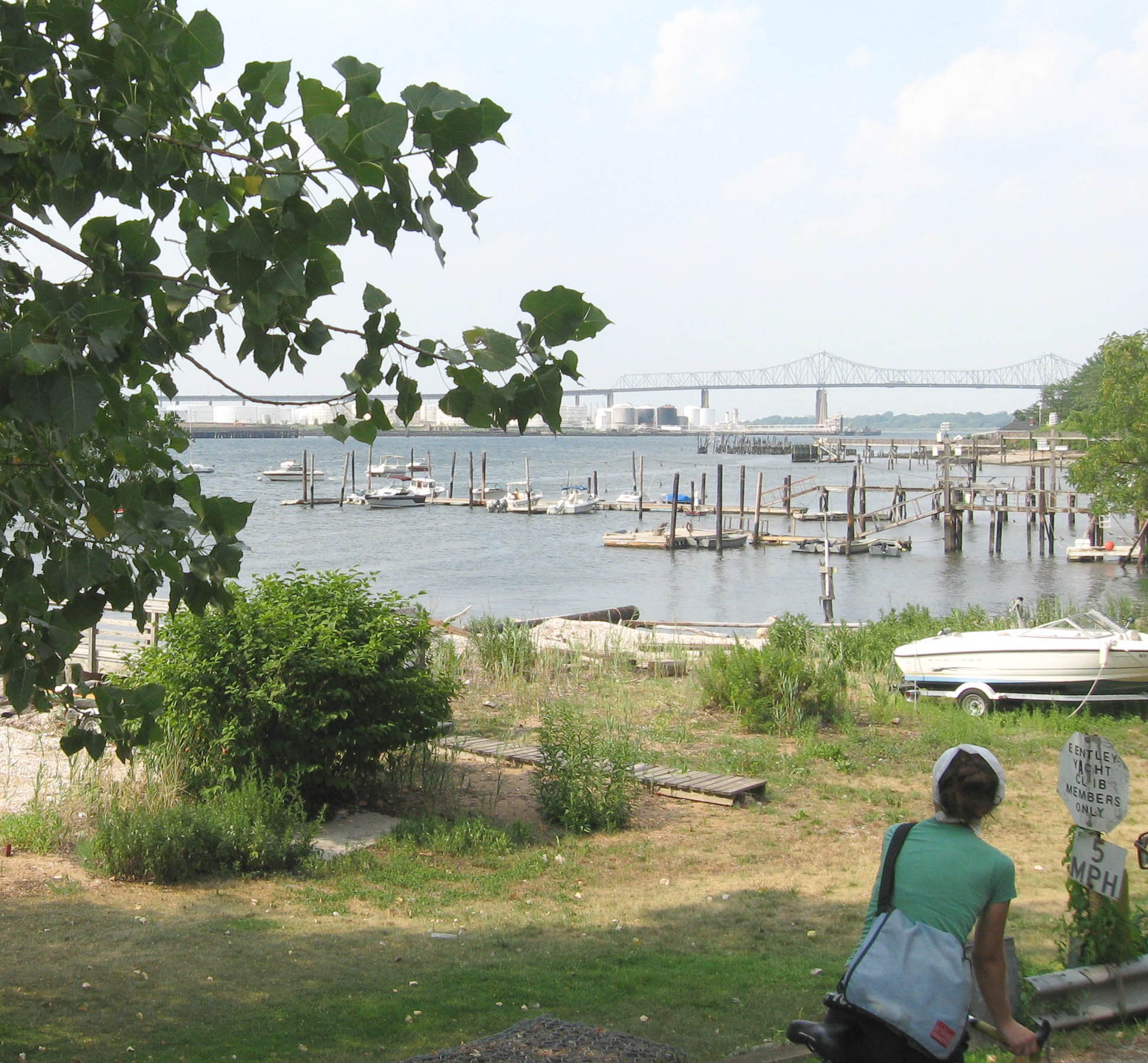
A view of Arthur Kill, the waterway between Staten Island and the New Jersey mainland; the Outerbridge Crossing is in the background

During an early period of industrialization, many small factories once dotted the neighborhood's western shoreline, but jobs have shifted and most are no longer in operation. Boat construction also once flourished along the shoreline, but the industry was rendered obsolete in 1900 when ships and commercial boats began being constructed of steel rather than wood. During World War I, shipbuilding was revived here, but that proved temporary. Tottenville's last shipyard closed in 1930.

Harvesting oysters from surrounding waters was important to the economy in the late 19th and early 20th centuries. But this practice ceased in 1916 when the New York City Health Department determined that pollution made it unsafe. After the decrease in waterfront industries and decades of working to improve water quality, in 2005, the city approved oyster harvesting again.

Until the late 1950s, Tottenville 8 was one of the two telephone exchanges on the island with operators. The other was Honeywood 6. When dial service arrived, they were combined to become Yukon 4.

During the 1990s, the section of Tottenville southeast of Hylan Boulevard, until then nearly uninhabited, was an area of intense levels of new home construction. The district's population density and crime rate still rank among the lowest in New York City. Until the 2000s, commercial development had largely been restricted to the Main Street corridor in the heart of the neighborhood. A second commercial core began to emerge at the north end of the community along Page Avenue and west of Amboy Road at this time. Further expansion on the neighborhood's north end was seen in 2005 with the redevelopment of the old Nassau Smelting plant. Site clean up began in October 2006, and was scheduled to be finished within a year. The site had suffered chemical contamination, as it was principally used to recycle copper and other metals from old wires. Mill Creek, which runs through the site, was also scheduled to be cleaned as part of the project.

Tottenville Beach was largely undeveloped until the 1990s. It is exclusively residential, and is bordered on the south and west by Conference House Park. The beach for which the area was named is most popular for fishing, rather than swimming or sunbathing. During the first half of the 20th century, several hotels dotted the shoreline, including the Shore House Hotel. The Coral Bay Cafe restaurant operated there but was destroyed by Hurricane Sandy.

=== 21st century ===
Many large, stately homes built in Tottenville in the 19th century remain standing. But in the early 21st century, land developers have been buying up the property on which several of these houses have stood, with the intention of demolishing them and constructing townhouses on the property. The fate of 7484 Amboy Road, built circa 1870 as the parsonage of Bethel Methodist Church and contained an extremely large backyard, became the focus of an intense local controversy in March 2005. The community opposed plans by builder John Grossi, who had purchased the property, to raze the house and construct five townhouse units on the site. On March 17 Grossi spray-painted graffiti on the house, including a threat to fill it with low-income tenants under the federal Section 8 housing program.

The public outcry prompted New York City mayor Michael Bloomberg to have the home declared a landmark, and prevented its demolition. Bloomberg announced his decision during a visit to Tottenville on March 22, and the New York City Landmarks Preservation Commission made the designation official on April 12. After years of being uninhabited and in disrepair, the home was restored in 2017.

In March 2008, over 20 blocks in the northern section of the neighborhood were changed to one-way streets. This was intended to improve traffic management on the older, narrower blocks.

In 2016, a consortium of Bridgewater Capital and the Brooklyn-based Riseman family bought 30 acres (12 ha) of the Nassau Smelting property from Lucent Technologies. Their plans to rezone the property from Manufacturing (M) to residential (RX3) in order to develop residential housing units met with criticism and opposition from the community, because the soils were contaminated from the heavy metals that were recycled during Lucent Technologies tenure of operation. The future use of this property remains undetermined.

== Demographics ==
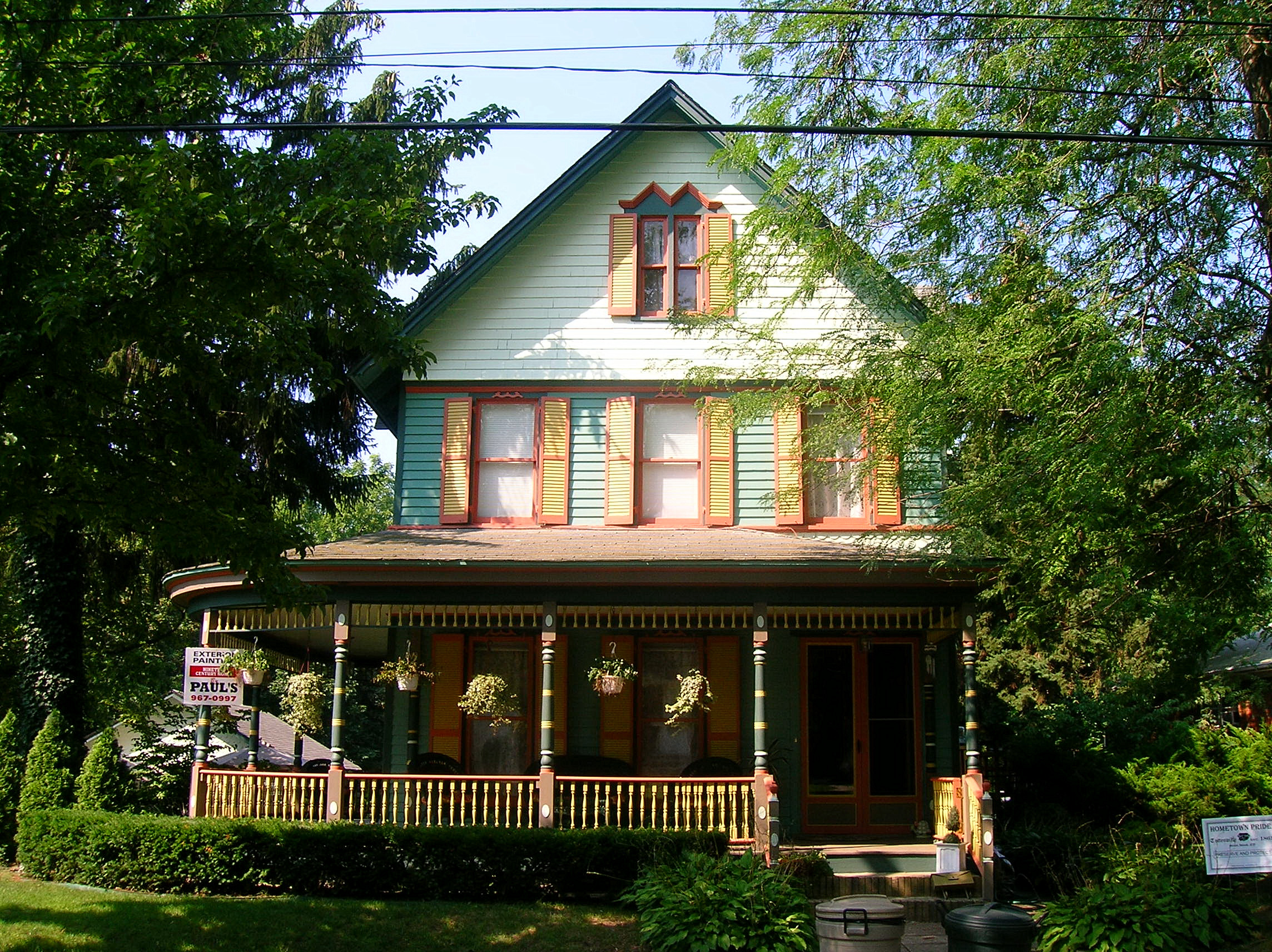
88 Bentley Street in August 2006

For census purposes, the New York City Department of City Planning classifies Tottenville as part of a larger Neighborhood Tabulation Area called Tottenville-Charleston SI0305. This neighborhood had 16,089 inhabitants based on data from the 2020 United States Census. This was an decrease of 771 persons (-4.6%) from the 16,860 counted in 2010. The neighborhood had a population density of 5.8 inhabitants per acre (14,500/sq mi; 5,600/km2).

The racial makeup of the neighborhood was 82.0% (13,186) White (Non-Hispanic), 0.8% (136) Black (Non-Hispanic), 2.7% (439) Asian, 0.7% (109) from some other race, and 2.0% (328) from two or more races. Hispanic or Latino of any race were 11.8% (1,891) of the population.

According to the 2020 United States Census, this area has many cultural communities of over 1,000 inhabitants. These groups are residents who identify as German, Irish, and Italian.

Most inhabitants are higher-aged adults: 29.9% are between 49-64 years old. 71.0% of the households had at least one family present. Out of the 5,818 households, 54.8% had a married couple (22.9% with a child under 18), 4.0% had a cohabiting couple (1.3% with a child under 18), 16.1% had a single male (0.9% with a child under 18), and 25.1% had a single female (3.5% with a child under 18). 31.7% of households had children. In this neighborhood, 29.4% of non-vacant housing units are renter-occupied.

The entirety of Community District 3, which comprises Tottenville and other South Shore neighborhoods, had 159,132 inhabitants as of NYC Health's 2018 Community Health Profile, with an average life expectancy of 81.3 years. This is about the same as the median life expectancy of 81.2 for all New York City neighborhoods. Most inhabitants are youth and middle-aged adults: 21% are between the ages of between 0–17, 26% between 25 and 44, and 29% between 45 and 64. The ratio of college-aged and elderly residents was lower, at 8% and 16% respectively.

As of 2017, the median household income in Community District 3 was $96,796, though the median income in Tottenville individually was $81,478. In 2018, an estimated 11% of Tottenville and the South Shore residents lived in poverty, compared to 17% in all of Staten Island and 20% in all of New York City. One in sixteen residents (6%) were unemployed, compared to 6% in Staten Island and 9% in New York City. Rent burden, or the percentage of residents who have difficulty paying their rent, is 42% in Tottenville and the South Shore, compared to the boroughwide and citywide rates of 49% and 51% respectively. Based on this calculation, as of 2018, Tottenville and the South Shore are considered high-income relative to the rest of the city and not gentrifying.

== Culture ==
There have been a growing number of Coptic Orthodox Christians from Egypt; as of 2012, the Virgin St. Mary and St. George Coptic Orthodox Church in Tottenville is one of two Coptic parishes on Staten Island.

== Politics ==
The neighborhood is represented in the New York City Council by Frank Morano, in the New York State Senate by Andrew Lanza, and in the New York State Assembly by Michael Reilly. Tottenville is located within Staten Island Community District 3.

== Climate ==
Climate data for Perth Amboy, New Jersey (across river/kill from Tottenville)
Month	Jan	Feb	Mar	Apr	May	Jun	Jul	Aug	Sep	Oct	Nov	Dec	Year
Mean daily maximum °F (°C)	39 (4)	43 (6)	52 (11)	64 (18)	74 (23)	83 (28)	87 (31)	85 (29)	78 (26)	66 (19)	55 (13)	43 (6)	64 (18)
Mean daily minimum °F (°C)	23 (−5)	25 (−4)	32 (0)	41 (5)	50 (10)	60 (16)	65 (18)	64 (18)	56 (13)	45 (7)	36 (2)	28 (−2)	44 (7)
Average precipitation inches (mm)	3.63 (92)	3.06 (78)	4.13 (105)	4.01 (102)	4.22 (107)	4.21 (107)	5.50 (140)	3.73 (95)	4.57 (116)	4.21 (107)	3.85 (98)	4.00 (102)	49.12 (1,248)

== Entertainment ==
The Stadium Theatre, a 1,037-seat movie theater, was located in Tottenville from 1927 to 1957. In January 1969 it re-opened as the New Stadium Theatre and was a rock-music venue hosting bands such as The Brooklyn Bridge. By the 1970s it had become the site of a roller rink. It is currently closed and plans have not been made to reopen the theater.

== Police and crime ==
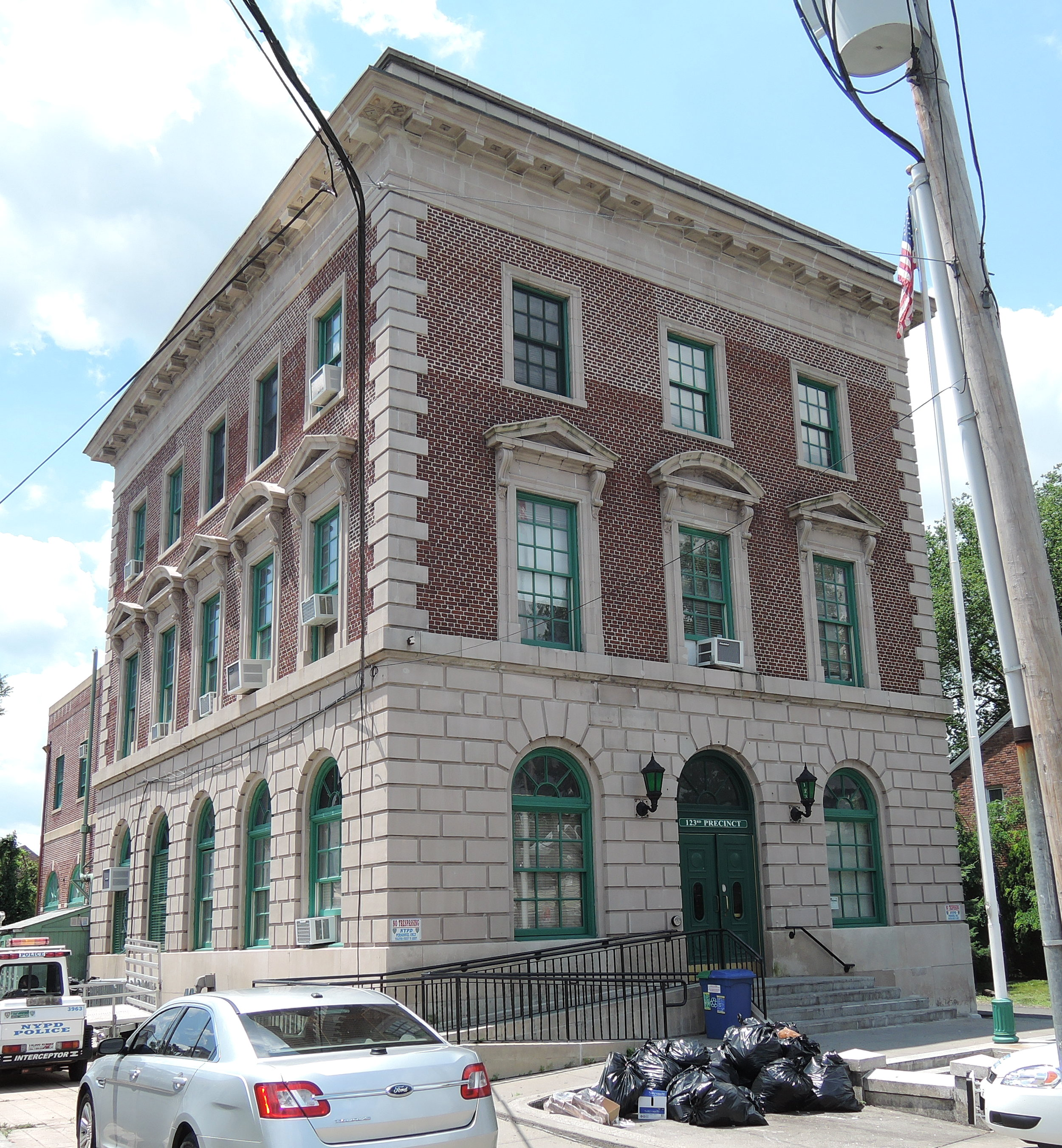
123rd Precinct, on Main Street

Tottenville and the South Shore are patrolled by the 123rd Precinct of the NYPD, located at 116 Main Street. The 123rd Precinct ranked safest out of 69 patrol areas for per-capita crime in 2010. As of 2018, with a non-fatal assault rate of 25 per 100,000 people, Tottenville and the South Shore's rate of violent crimes per capita is less than that of the city as a whole. The incarceration rate of 193 per 100,000 people is lower than that of the city as a whole.

The 123rd Precinct has a substantially lower crime rate than in the 1990s, with crimes across all categories having decreased by 70.5% between 1990 and 2022. The precinct reported two murders, three rapes, 22 robberies, 53 felony assaults, 42 burglaries, 271 grand larcenies, and 126 grand larcenies auto in 2022.

== Fire safety ==
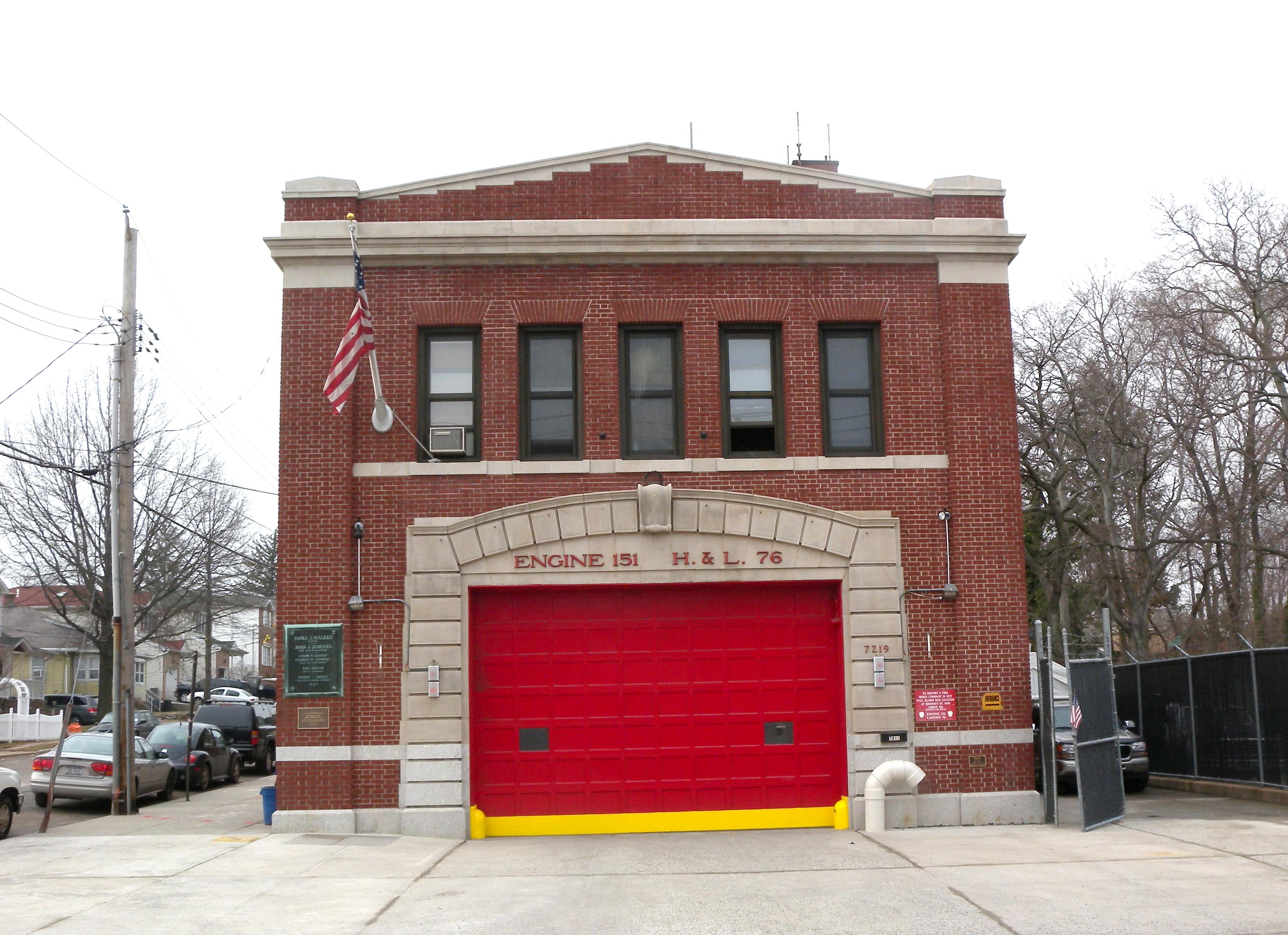
Firehouse on Amboy Road

Tottenville is served by the New York City Fire Department (FDNY)'s Engine Co. 151/Ladder Co. 76, located at 7219 Amboy Road.

== Health ==
As of 2018, preterm births and births to teenage mothers are less common in Tottenville and the South Shore than in other places citywide. In Tottenville and the South Shore, there were 77 preterm births per 1,000 live births (compared to 87 per 1,000 citywide), and 3.6 births to teenage mothers per 1,000 live births (compared to 19.3 per 1,000 citywide). Tottenville and the South Shore have a low population of residents who are uninsured. In 2018, this population of uninsured residents was estimated to be 4%, less than the citywide rate of 12%, though this was based on a small sample size.

The concentration of fine particulate matter, the deadliest type of air pollutant, in Tottenville and the South Shore is 0.0066 milligrams per cubic metre (6.6×10^{−9} oz/ft^{3}), less than the city average. Seventeen percent of Tottenville and the South Shore residents are smokers, which is more than the city average of 14% of residents being smokers. In Tottenville and the South Shore, 26% of residents are obese, 9% are diabetic, and 22% have high blood pressure—compared to the citywide averages of 24%, 11%, and 28% respectively. In addition, 17% of children are obese, compared to the citywide average of 20%.

Ninety-five percent of residents eat some fruits and vegetables every day, which is more than the city's average of 87%. In 2018, 88% of residents described their health as "good", "very good", or "excellent", more than the city's average of 78%. For every supermarket in Tottenville and the South Shore, there are 4 bodegas.

The nearest major hospital is Staten Island University Hospital South Campus in Prince's Bay.

== Post office and ZIP Codes ==
Tottenville is located exclusively within the ZIP Code 10307. The United States Postal Service operates one post office in Tottenville, located at 228 Main Street.

== Education ==
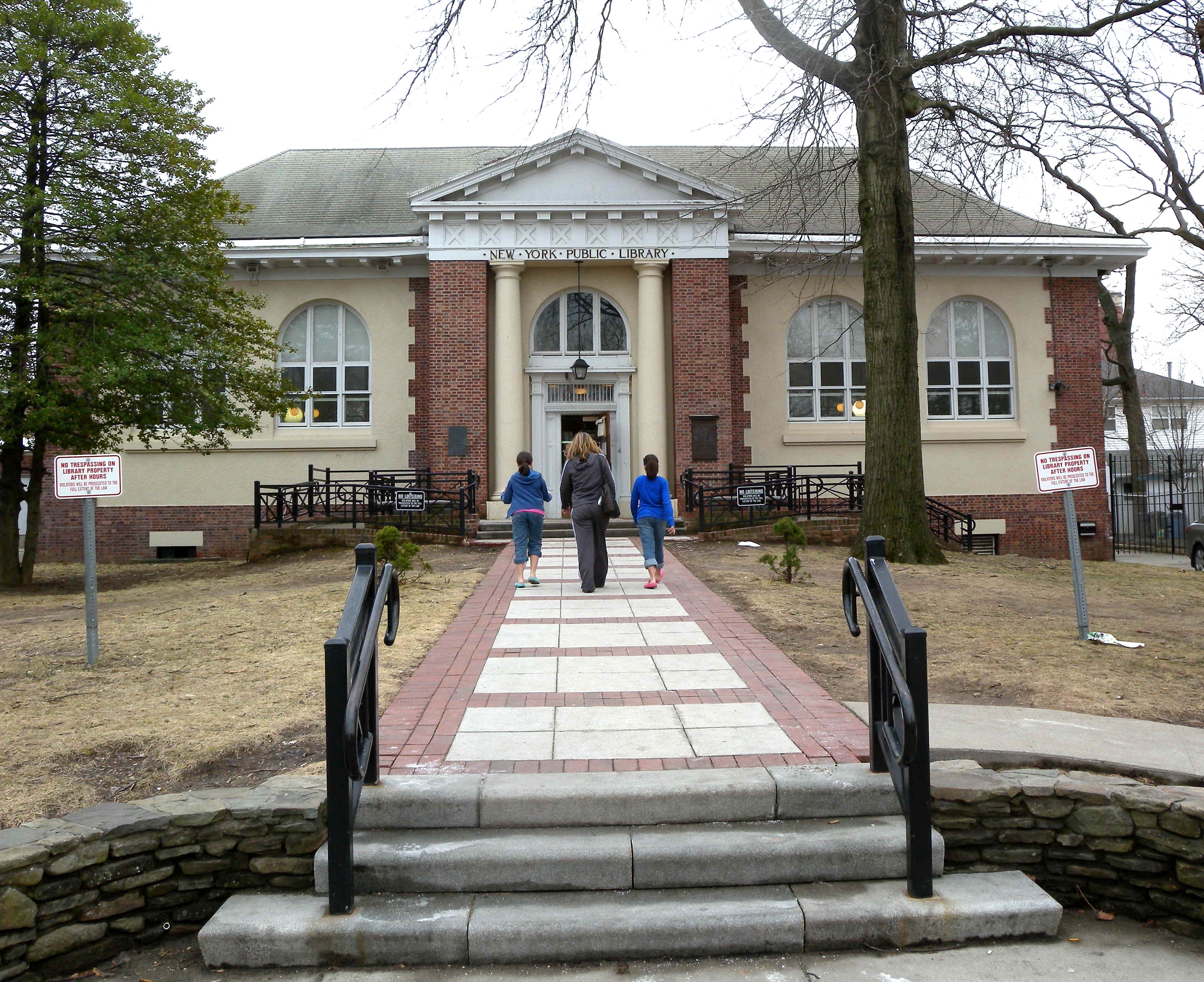
New York Public Library, Tottenville branch

Tottenville and the South Shore generally have a similar rate of college-educated residents to the rest of the city as of 2018. While 41% of residents age 25 and older have a college education or higher, 8% have less than a high school education and 51% are high school graduates or have some college education. By contrast, 39% of Staten Island residents and 43% of city residents have a college education or higher. The percentage of Tottenville and the South Shore students excelling in math rose from 48% in 2000 to 65% in 2011, though reading achievement declined from 55% to 52% during the same time period.

Tottenville and the South Shore's rate of elementary school student absenteeism is lower than the rest of New York City. In Tottenville and the South Shore, 12% of elementary school students missed twenty or more days per school year, less than the citywide average of 20%. Additionally, 89% of high school students in Tottenville and the South Shore graduate on time, more than the citywide average of 75%.

=== Schools ===
Tottenville High School, a public school, was originally located in the neighborhood, but a new campus was opened approximately three miles to the north, in the neighborhood of Huguenot, in 1971 (Totten Intermediate School 34 or I.S. 34, an intermediate school, now occupies the original high school building). One of the area's oldest buildings is the old building of P.S.1 (the Tottenville School), dating from 1878, and is unique for its traditional sloped roof. Today it is still in operation, now served by a second, newer building as well, built in 1929. In 2000, a new elementary school, P.S.6 (the Corporal Allan F. Kivlehan School), was opened to serve eastern Tottenville's growing population, as well as other neighboring areas. Tottenville's local Catholic school was Our Lady Help of Christians School, which was run under Our Lady Help of Christians Parish. The school dates back to 1904. It was announced in February, 2019 that this school would close at the end of the 2018–2019 school year.

=== Library ===
The New York Public Library (NYPL)'s Tottenville branch is located at 7430 Amboy Road. The one-story Carnegie library building was designed by Carrère and Hastings and opened in 1904. It is a New York City designated landmark.

== Transportation ==
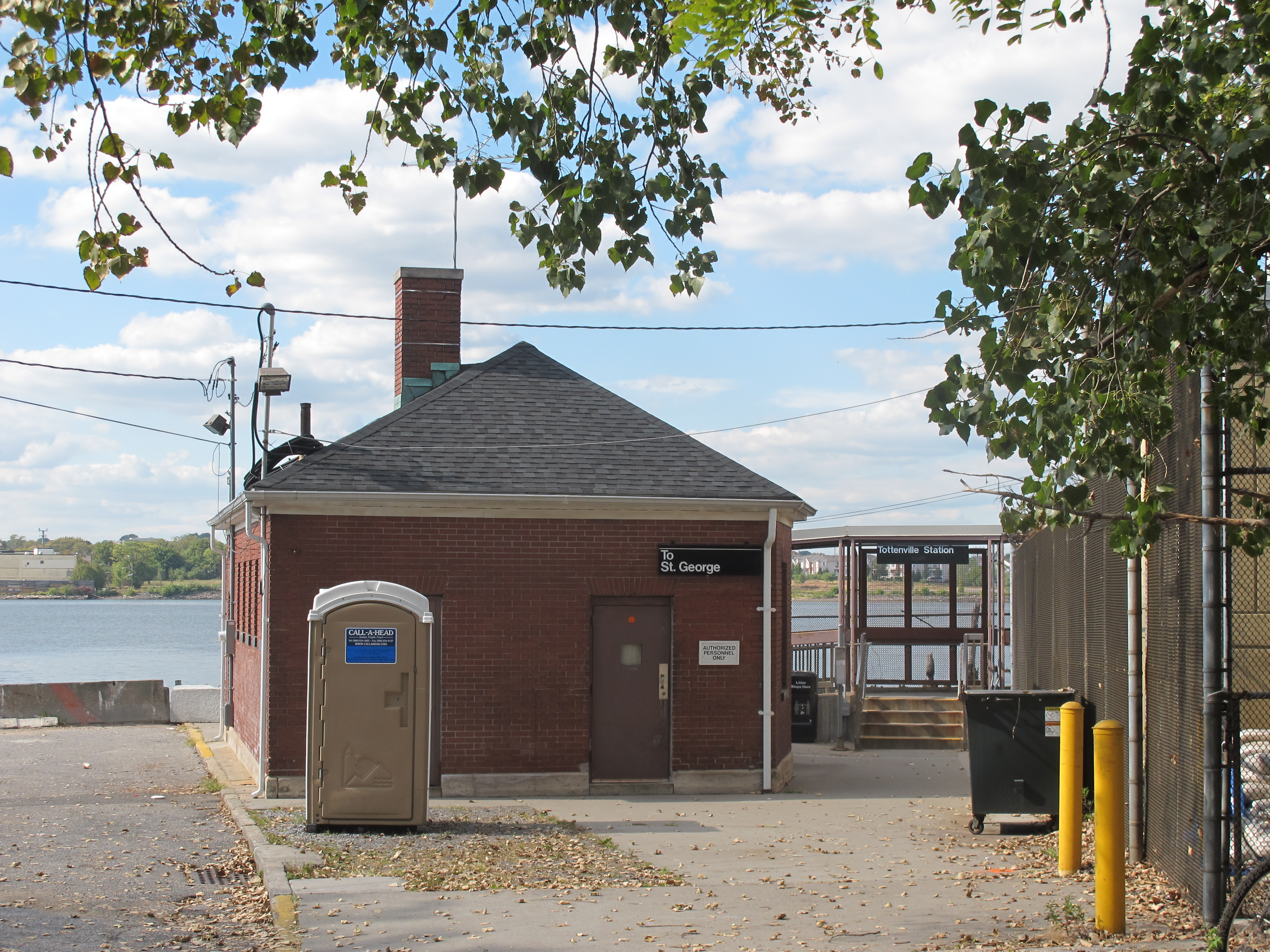
A view of the southern end of Tottenville Station, 2013

The Tottenville station has been the southern terminus of the Staten Island Railway since the railway was extended to the neighborhood on June 2, 1860. Today, the neighborhood of Tottenville contains the two southernmost stations along the line: Tottenville station (the southernmost railway station in New York state), and Arthur Kill station. Before Arthur Kill opened on January 21, 2017, there were two other stations which were Atlantic (named after the defunct Atlantic Terra Cotta Company factory nearby) and Nassau (referring to Nassau Smelting and Refining, the original name of the factory later taken over by Lucent Technologies), which closed on the same day that Arthur Kill was opened, as Arthur Kill replaced both of them. Atlantic and Nassau stations are now closed and demolished. The 14-mile trip to the St. George Terminal takes 42 minutes.

Tottenville is served by the S59 and S78 local buses. Express bus service to and from Manhattan is provided by the SIM2, SIM25 and SIM26.

Though no highways pass through the neighborhood, NY Route 440 and Korean War Veterans Parkway (formerly known as Richmond Parkway) are located nearby.

== Notable residents ==
- Patti Hansen, a model and actress who is married to Rolling Stones guitarist Keith Richards, was born and raised in Tottenville.
- George H. Pepper, turn of the 20th century archeologist whose notable work included digs from the local Burial Ridge to Chaco Canyon in New Mexico, was born here.
- Paul Zindel, 20th century playwright and young adult author, was born here.
- Andy Milligan, American playwright, screenwriter, actor and filmmaker, operated a hotel and lived here in the mid-1970s.
- Jason Marquis, MLB player, played for Tottenville High School
