= Ward's Point =

Coordinates: 40°29′56″N 74°15′07″W

- Ward's Point Archeological Site
- U.S. National Register of Historic Places
- U.S. National Historic Landmark
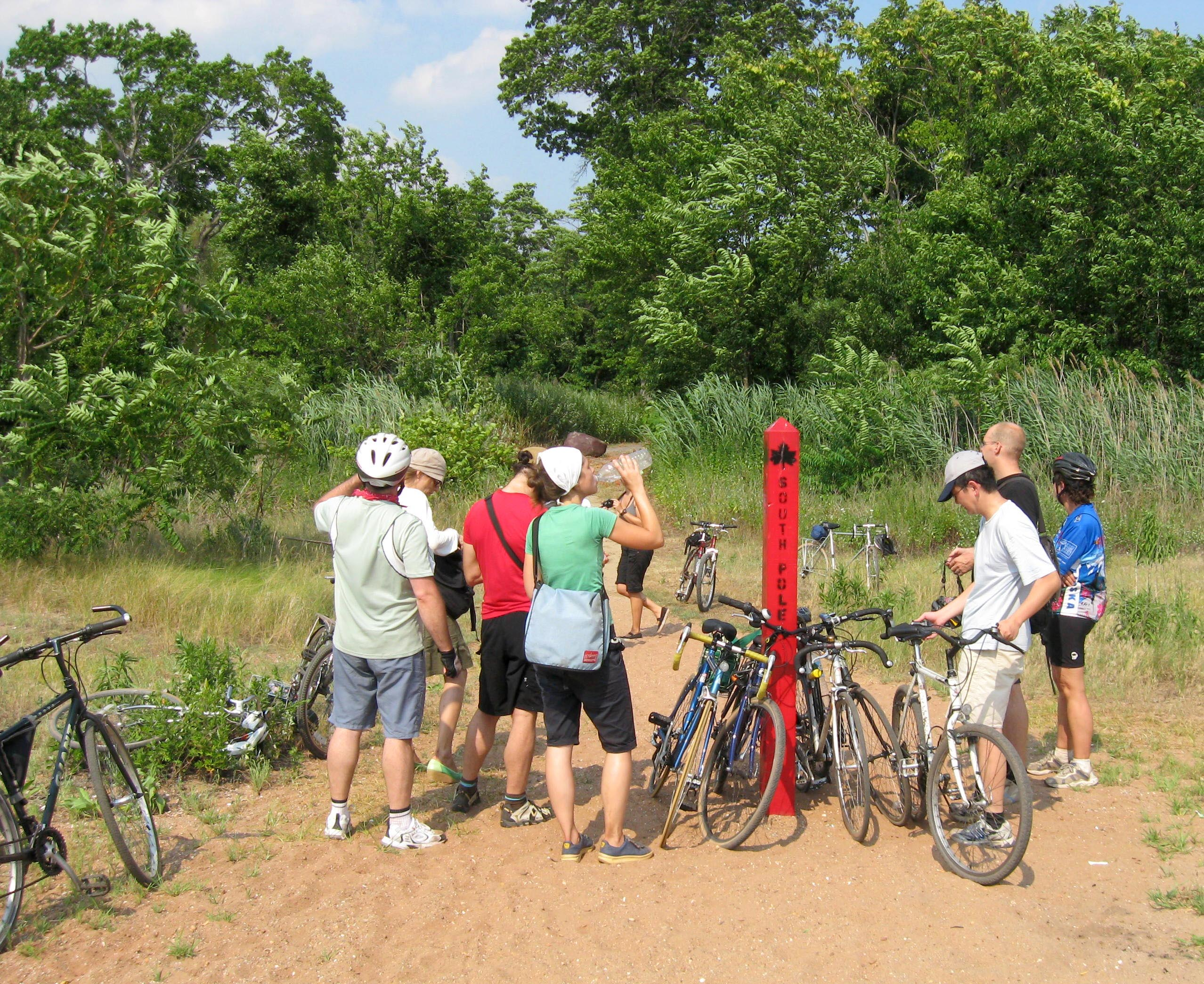
- New York City Parks Department "South Pole" marker at Ward's Point
- Location: Tottenville, Staten Island, New York
- NRHP reference No.: 93000609

Significant dates
- Added to NRHP: April 19, 1993
- Designated NHL: April 19, 1993

- Ward's Point Conservation Area
- U.S. National Register of Historic Places
- U.S. Historic district
- Location within New York City Location within New York Location within the United States
- Area: 33.5 acres (13.6 ha)
- NRHP reference No.: 82003402
- Added to NRHP: September 29, 1982

Ward's Point is the southernmost point in the U.S. state of New York and lies within Tottenville, Staten Island, New York City. It is located at the mouth of Arthur Kill, across from Perth Amboy, New Jersey, at the head of Raritan Bay. The site is part of modern-day Conference House Park.

== Ward's Point Conservation Area ==
Ward's Point Conservation Area is a historic archaeological site and national historic district. The district encompasses nine contributing sites. It includes the property on which the Conference House sits. The Conference House was listed as a National Historic Landmark in 1966. The conservation area was specifically identified for preservation based on "the information it may provide on prehistoric and historic Indian subsistence and settlement on Staten Island." A number of prehistoric remains have been located on the site. It was added to the National Register of Historic Places in 1982.

== Ward's Point Archeological Site ==
Near Ward's Point is the Ward's Point Archeological Site, an archaeological site within Conference House Park. It was declared a National Historic Landmark in 1993. The site has been known since 1858, when human remains were first unearthed in the area. It is one of the largest and best preserved sites for studying Native American people in the New York area.

It overlaps with the Aakawaxung Munahanung (Island Protected from the Wind) Archaeological Site in Conference House Park, which was designated by the New York City Landmarks Preservation Commission in 2021.

== Burial Ridge ==
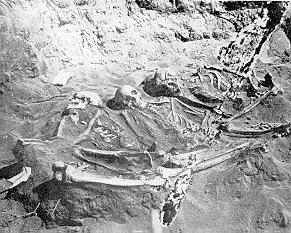
Skeletons of three warriors pierced by arrows uncovered at Burial Ridge.

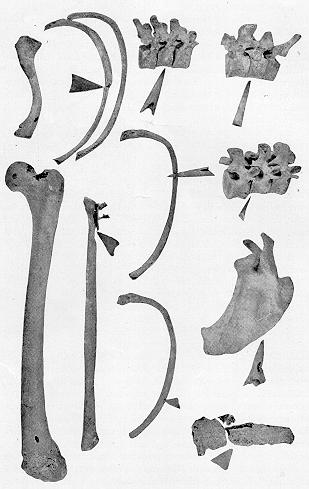
Bones pierced by arrowheads from skeletons unearthed at Burial Ridge.

Burial Ridge is a Native American archaeological site and burial ground located at Ward's Point.

=== History ===
The first documented evidence of Paleo-Indians using the site is from the end of the Early Archaic Period 8,000 years ago. The burial ground—used by the Lenape dating from the Woodland period until relinquishing Staten Island to the Dutch—is the largest pre-European burial ground in New York City and today remains unmarked and lies within Conference House Park.

Evidence of prior Native American habitation is still visible along the beach at the bluff's lowest elevations, where erosion exposes the remains of large shell middens dominated by shells of the Eastern oyster.

Bodies were reported unearthed at Burial Ridge during various periods in the 19th century beginning in 1858. After conducting independent research, which included unearthing bodies interred at the site, ethnologist and archaeologist George H. Pepper was contracted in 1895 to conduct paid archaeological research at Burial Ridge by the American Museum of Natural History.

Many of the skeletons unearthed were buried in flexed positions, with the knees drawn up to the chest; fewer were found in a laid-out position. Most of the graves were fairly shallow, ranging from 1–3 feet (0.30–0.91 m) in depth below grade. Many of the graves contained assorted grave goods, among them arrowheads and various stone implements such as ax heads and hammerstones.

One of the burials contained the skeletons of three males, with the bones pierced by 23 arrowheads made of bone, antler, argillite and flint.

Close to the three males, the body of a child was unearthed with a variety of grave goods, including pendants made of yellow jasper and various utensils. The body also showed evidence of copper salts about the lower portion of the skull, mandible and sternum, which indicated that copper ornaments were buried with the body. An additional skeleton unearthed in a prone position was completely charred above the knees, suggesting he may have been burned alive while tied to a stake.

== See also ==
- List of New York City Designated Landmarks in Staten Island
- List of National Historic Landmarks in New York City
- National Register of Historic Places listings in Staten Island
- Raritan (Native Americans)
