= Church of Our Lady Help of Christians (Staten Island) =

Church in New York City, US

Coordinates: 40°30′35.26″N 74°14′36.41″W

The Church of Our Lady Help of Christians
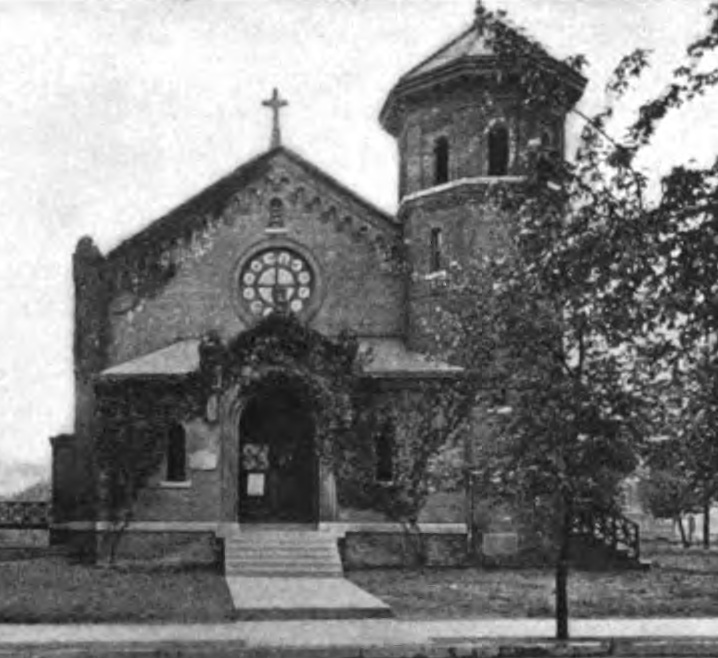
- The old church building as it appeared in 1914
- The Church of Our Lady Help of Christians
- Location: 7396 Amboy Road; Tottenville, Staten Island, New York
- Country: United States of America
- Website: http://olhcparish.org

Administration
- Archdiocese: New York

The Church of Our Lady Help of Christians is a parish church under the authority of the Roman Catholic Archdiocese of New York, located in Tottenville, Staten Island, New York City. The church was established in 1890 as a mission of St. Joseph's Church (Rossville) and became an independent parish in 1898. Its first church building was constructed later that year. It burned down in 1985 and was rebuilt in 1990.

Social activist Dorothy Day, now a candidate for sainthood, converted to Catholicism with her conditional baptism at Our Lady Help of Christians in 1927.

== School ==
The church formerly had a parish school, established in 1904, until it closed in 2019 with 166 students. During the COVID-19 pandemic in 2020, it reopened as the James P. Murphy Staten Island Preparatory School, a private school operated by AHRC New York City for students with special needs.
