= Perth Amboy Ferry Slip =

- U.S. National Register of Historic Places
- New Jersey Register of Historic Places
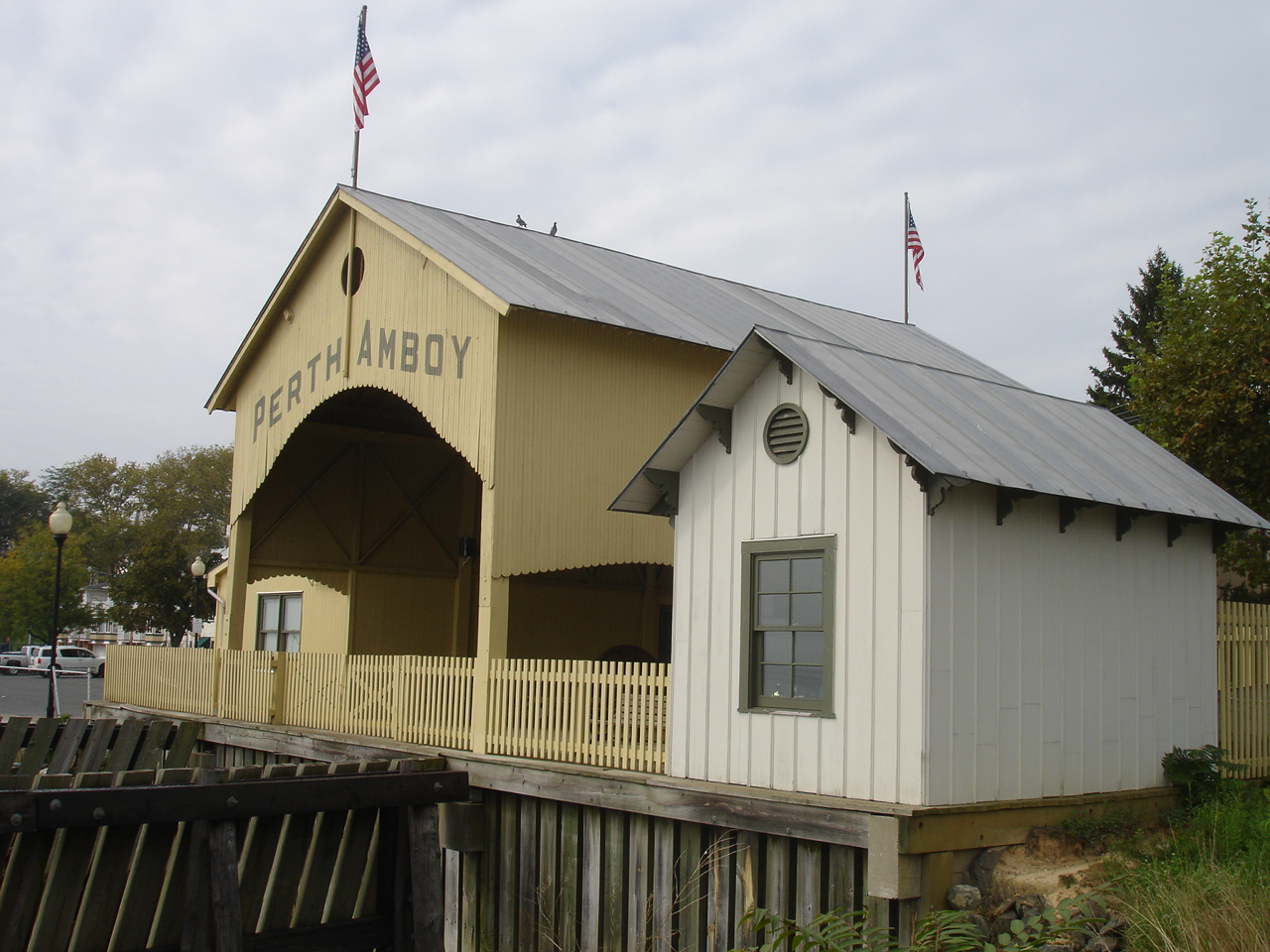
- The Perth Amboy Ferry Slip in fall of 2011

- Location within Middlesex County, New Jersey Location within New Jersey Location within the United States
- Location: Foot of Smith Street; Perth Amboy, New Jersey
- Coordinates: 40°30′25″N 74°15′43″W
- Built: 1904
- NRHP reference No.: 78001773
- NJRHP No.: 1898

Significant dates
- Added to NRHP: January 12, 1981
- Designated NJRHP: July 12, 1978

The Perth Amboy Ferry Slip, located on the Arthur Kill in Perth Amboy, Middlesex County, New Jersey, United States, was once a vital ferry slip for boats in New York Harbor. It was added to the New Jersey Register of Historic Places and National Register of Historic Places in 1978. The ferry slip was restored in 1998 to its 1904 appearance. A replica of the ticket office has been constructed and is used as a small museum.

== History ==
Perth Amboy is located at the mouth of the Raritan River at the Raritan Bay, an arm of the Lower New York Bay. Perth Amboy served as New Jersey's capital from 1686 until 1776. In 1684, it became the capital of East Jersey and remained so after the union of East and West Jersey in 1702, becoming an alternate colonial capital with Burlington until 1776. Ferry service at the site dates back to 1684. During the colonial era and for a long thereafter, Perth Amboy was an important way-station for travel between New York City and Philadelphia, providing the waterways used by the ferry service originally set up by Cornelius Vanderbilt, who later became known as "The Commodore". The slip was later used to transport newly arrived immigrants from Ellis Island, many of whom remained in the town.

The native Lenape provided crossings to settlers as early as 1680. The longest-running ferry service crossed the Arthur Kill to Tottenville, Staten Island, with regular service beginning in 1709 or 1719 operated by Christopher Billopp. Steam service was introduced in the late 19th century by the Baltimore and Ohio Railroad and ran until 1943, and was served by the Staten Island Railway at the Tottenville station. In the early motoring age the ferry was an important link for travelers to the Jersey Shore It became less important with the 1928 opening of the Outerbridge Crossing, but continued operating until October 17, 1963.

== Gallery ==
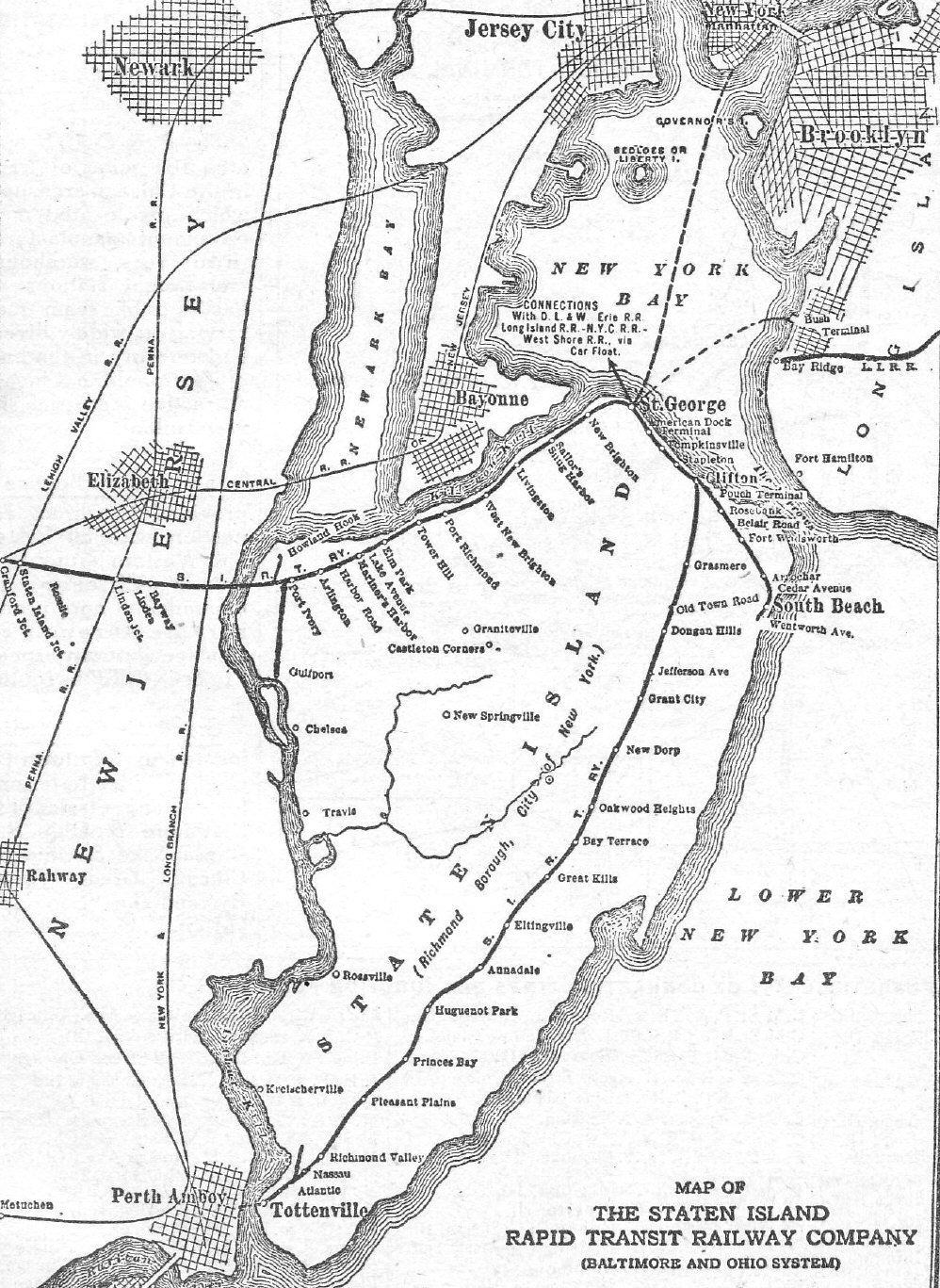
Perth Amboy-Tottenville Ferry connected to the Staten Island Railway

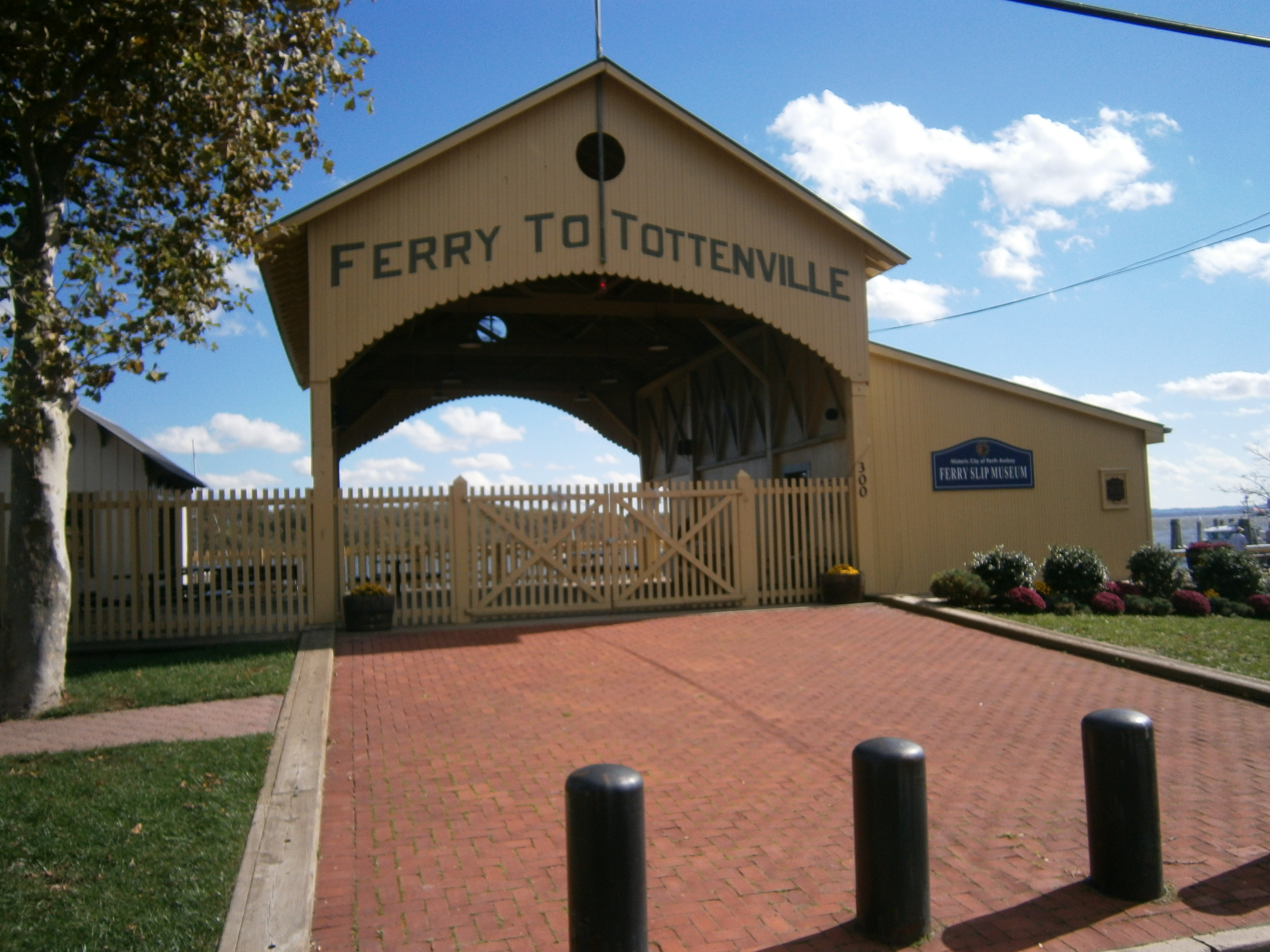
Looking toward the Perth Amboy Ferry Slip in the direction of departure towards Tottenville

== See also ==
- National Register of Historic Places listings in Middlesex County, New Jersey
- New Jersey Coastal Heritage Trail Route
- List of ferries across the Hudson River to New York City
- Gibbons v. Ogden
