= Christopher Billopp (Royal Navy officer) =

Royal Navy officer

Captain Christopher Billopp
- Born: c. 1650
- Died: 1725 (aged 74–75)
- Relatives: Christopher Billop (great-grandson)
- Military career
- Allegiance: Kingdom of Great Britain
- Branch: Royal Navy
- Rank: Captain
- Commands: HMS Prudent Mary; HMS Rainbow; HMS Deptford; HMS Greenwich; HMS Suffolk; HMS Ossory; HMS Victory; HMS London
- Conflicts: Third Anglo-Dutch War; Battle of Texel; Nine Years' War; Battle of Bantry Bay; Battle of Barfleur

Christopher Billopp or Billop (c. 1650 – 1725) was a Royal Navy officer who commanded various ships of the line, including HMS Greenwich in the Battle of Bantry Bay. He is noted as part of the "Staten Island Legend", a likely apocryphal story that describes Billopp's circumnavigation of Staten Island in a sailing race to claim it for New York. Though the legend has survived in oral tradition and popular culture since at least the 19th century, there is no concrete evidence that such a race occurred.

== Government service ==
In 1709, Billopp received a charter to operate the Perth Amboy Ferry, part of an important overland route between New York and Philadelphia.

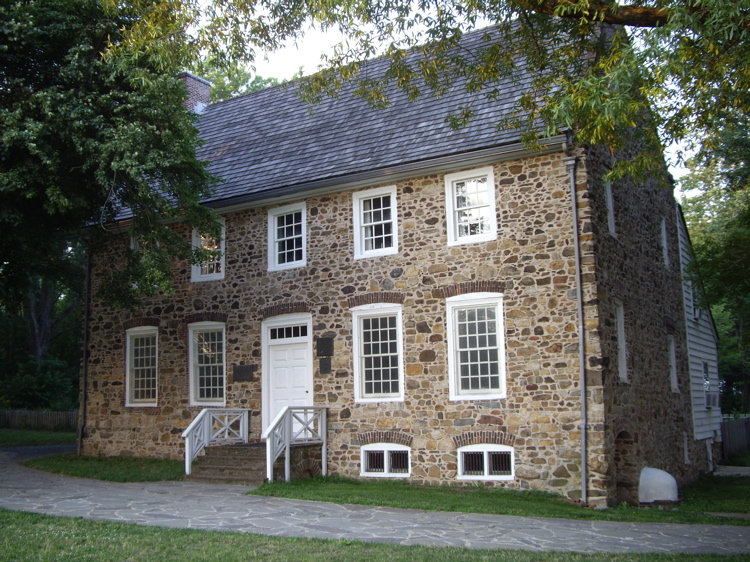
Bentley Manor, now known as The Conference House

== Staten Island Legend ==
The legend describes Billopp's alleged role in securing Staten Island for New York. To settle a territorial dispute between New York and New Jersey, the Duke of York was said to have come up with a novel solution: he declared that all islands in New York Harbor that could be circumnavigated in 24 hours would belong to New York, and if such a voyage took longer than that, they would belong to New Jersey. Although there have been many descriptions of what happened during the period of before and after Billopp circumnavigated Staten Island, one, which is described in the following text, has been the most reiterated:

The task of sailing around Staten Island was assigned to Christopher Billopp, who, in his sloop, the Bentley, circumnavigated the Island in a few minutes less than 24 hours, and thus saved the Island for the Duke of York. Christopher Billopp was rewarded by a grant of about 1,163 acres of land at the extreme south end of the Island, and he there built a house which is still standing, and which is called the Bentl[e]y Manor, in honor of the ship owned by Billopp.

— Early History of Staten Island, Cornelius Kolff, 1918

At this time, Billopp was just across the waterway from Staten Island at Perth Amboy, New Jersey aboard a small two-gun vessel called the Bentley. Billopp was selected for the duke's challenge. While struggling to figure out how to complete the more than 35-mile (56 km) voyage within the duke's time frame of 24 hours, Billopp reasoned that if he packed the deck of his ship with empty barrels, the extra surface area could harness some more wind giving his ship a slight boost in speed. Thus equipped, Billopp completed the circumnavigation in just over 23 hours and secured Staten Island for New York. In recognition of his achievement, the duke awarded Billopp a total of 1,163 acres (4.71 km^{2}) of land located in what is now the Tottenville section of Staten Island. On this land, Billopp built his house, which he named the Manor of Bentley in honor of his ship.

While this anecdote has been widely repeated, including by Mayor of New York City Michael Bloomberg, reliable historical documentation of the event is sparse. In 2007, The New York Times addressed the issue in a news article, which concluded that this event was heavily embellished over the years and almost certainly originated in local folklore. YouTuber CGP Grey provided a similar conclusion in a 2019 video addressing the story of the Staten Island race and its historical discrepancies. However, the evidence is sparse to say the least, with many credible sources with conflicting dates and details, and the oldest known source being an anecdote. Also the time of the conflict regarding Staten Island has no clear period. Two Supreme Court cases dealt with disputes regarding the islands in New York Harbor, with the later one being about ownership of Ellis Island and the older one having no mention of Staten Island.

== Naval career ==
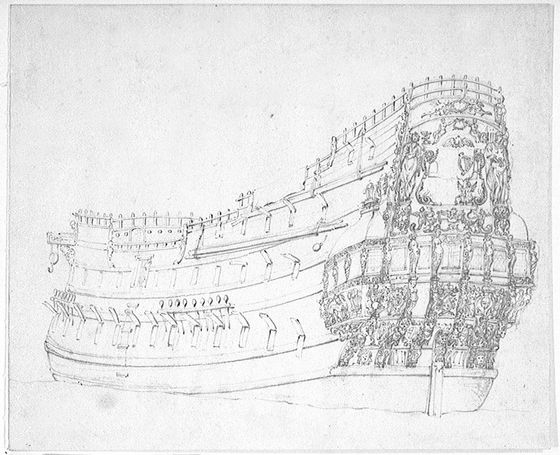
HMS Victory, one of the ships captained by Christopher Billopp

Billopp served in a number of Royal Naval vessels:

- As lieutenant:
  - HMS Portsmouth
  - HMS Bristol
- As captain:
  - HMS Suffolk during the Battle of Barfleur
  - HMS Rainbow
  - HMS Ossory
  - HMS London
  - HMS Greenwich during the Battle of Bantry Bay
  - HMS Victory
  - HMS Deptford: a 10 gun ketch
  - Prudent Mary; fire ship; commanded the ship on 11 August 1673 during the Battle of Texel during the Third Anglo-Dutch War. While attempting to get alongside the ship of the Dutch Admiral Cornelis Tromp, was grappled by a Dutch fireship, both burned together.

== Crown grants and legacy ==
Billopp was given a crown grant by James, Duke of York in 1676 for according to sources either 932 acres (3.77 km^{2}) or 1,167 acres (4.72 km^{2}), on Staten Island in the colony of New York, which became known as the Billop plantation. He built a stone manor house upon the land named "Bentley Manor", after the name of a small ship he had commanded, the Bentley.

In 1687, he received a second crown grant. Although land ownership went through several hands, including those of William Henry Aspinwall, the neighborhood retained the Bentley Manor name into the early 20th century. The house, inherited by his great-grandson Colonel Christopher Billopp, a British Loyalist during the American Revolution, was the setting for a failed peace conference between Lord Howe and members of the Continental Congress. His house is now a United States National Historic Landmark known as the Conference House.

== In New York ==
In 1664, the Dutch colonies became English colonies, and all fell under the control of the Duke of York, who was the brother of King Charles II. By 1667, a territorial dispute raged over Staten Island between New York, namesake of the duke, and New Jersey, which had possession of Staten Island under Dutch rule. To settle the dispute, the duke supposedly came up with a novel solution: he declared that all islands in New York Harbor that could be circumnavigated in 24 hours would belong to New York, and if such a voyage took longer than that, they would belong to New Jersey. For more information, see the Staten Island section above.

On Staten Island Billopp built his house after this, which he named the Manor of Bentley in honor of his ship. In 1709 he gained the charter to operate the Perth Amboy Ferry, part of an important overland route between New York and Philadelphia. Billopp served for a time as a lieutenant in command of an infantry detachment under colonial governor Edmund Andros.

== Bibliography ==
- The Londons of the British fleet, how they faced the enemy on the day of battle and what their story means for us to-day, Edward Fraser (1908), J. Lane (London)
