= Christopher Billop =

American-born military officer and politician

Christopher Billopp
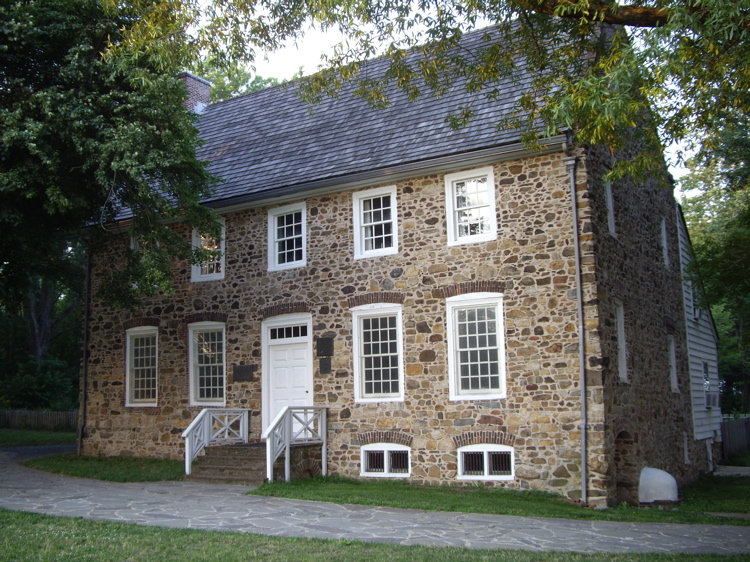
- "The Conference House" Christopher Billopp’s home on Staten Island

Personal details
- Born: c. 1738
- Died: March 29, 1827 (aged 88–89)

Colonel Christopher Billopp (c. 1738 – March 29, 1827) was an American-born military officer and politician who served in the American Revolutionary War. During the conflict, he was nicknamed the "Tory Colonel" by Patriots. After the conflict ended in 1783, Billopp emigrated to New Brunswick along with other Loyalists and became a politician, representing Saint John in the 1st New Brunswick Legislative Assembly.

== History ==
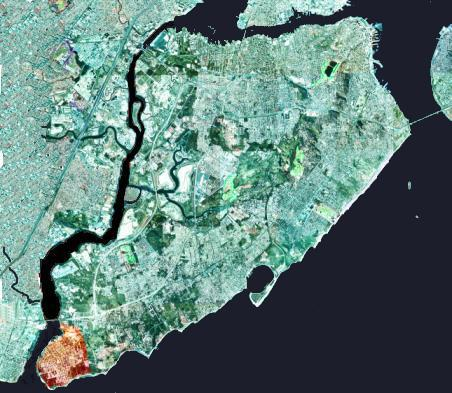
Staten Island, New York

Historical illustration of "Bentley Manor", back of the house.

Billop was born on Staten Island in New York, the eldest of eight children born to Thomas and Sarah Farmar Billopp. His father Major Thomas Billopp was the son of Anne Billopp who married Colonel Thomas Farmar in 1705. Anne Billopp and her sister Mary were the daughters of Royal Navy officer Christopher Billopp who was awarded 932 acres (3.77 km^{2}) of land on the southern tip of Staten Island, where he built a stone manor house he called "Bentley Manor".

Billopp served as a colonel in the Loyalist forces during the American Revolution, commanding the Billopp's Corps of Staten Island Militia formed on July 6, 1776, at a meeting of 500 men in Richmondtown led by Governor William Tryon and General William Howe in reaction to the announcement of the Declaration of Independence. Col. Billopp's brother, Thomas Farmar (he resumed the family name Farmar) fought as a private in an American unit.

Billopp was captured twice by American patriots, one occasion occurred on June 23, 1779, when they rowed across the Arthur Kill from Perth Amboy, New Jersey. He was held as a prisoner of war in the Burlington County, New Jersey jail, where he was chained down to the floor and fed a diet of bread and water by order of Elias Boudinot, appointed by Congress as Commissary General of Prisoners. He was informed that his harsh treatment was in retaliation for the treatment of John Leshler and Captain Nathaniel Fitz Randolph of Woodbridge, New Jersey, being held by the British. Fitz Randolph would later be killed in the Battle of Springfield.

To the Keeper of the Common Jail for the county of Burlington. Greeting.

You are hereby commanded to receive into your custody, the body of Col. Christopher Billop, prisoner of war, herewith delivered to you, and having put irons on his hands and feet, you are to chain him down to the floor in a close room, in the said jail; and there so detain him, giving him bread and water only for his food, until you receive further orders from me, or the commissary of Prisoners for the State of New Jersey, for the time being. Given under my hand at Elizabeth Town, this 6th day of Nov. 1779.

ELIAS BOUDINOT, Com. Pris. New Jersey.

Sir, Sorry I am that I have been put under the disagreeable necessity of a treatment towards your person that will prove so irksome to you; but retaliation is directed, and it will, I most sincerely hope, be in your power to relieve yourself from the situation by writing to New York, to procure the relaxation of the sufferings of John Leshler, and Capt. Nathaniel Randolph. It seems, nothing short of retaliation will teach Britons to act like men of humanity.

I am, sir, your most humble servant, ELIAS BOUDINOT, Com. S. Pris.

Elizabeth Town, Nov. 6, 1779.

Another prisoner being held in the Burlington jail at the same time was John Graves Simcoe of the Queen's Rangers, who led a successful attack against American forces in Salem, New Jersey, and embarked on a raid into New Jersey, dubbed "Simcoe's Raid", from "Billop's point", as Christopher Billop's land was known. It was upon this raid he was captured and imprisoned with Billopp.

Portion of letter to George Washington from John Simcoe:

I was allowed my parole, was taken from it the 9th, and have ever since been confined a close prisoner in Burlington gaol, with Col. Billop, who is in irons and chained to the floor, to retaliate for F. Randolph and Leshier, the latter of whom is (said to be) confined in the same manner in New-York: my mittimus hath not expressed what I am imprisoned for; but, by the tenor of Governor Livingston's letters, I suppose it is to retaliate for the former of those citizens, whom he allows to be a private soldier, and who is simply confined as such.

It was not until after Christmas that Billopp was released in a prisoner exchange.

In October 1779 Billopp was one of 59 men branded by New York State as a Loyalist felon under the Confiscation Act, whereby he was subject to banishment and confiscation of all his property. As Staten Island was firmly under British control this carried no immediate weight; prudently Billopp in 1780 started selling off his land, often at only two-thirds of market prices.

When the war ended he left the newly formed United States of America for the British colony of Nova Scotia, and later New Brunswick when it was formed as a separate colony from the northern part of Nova Scotia.

=== In New Brunswick ===
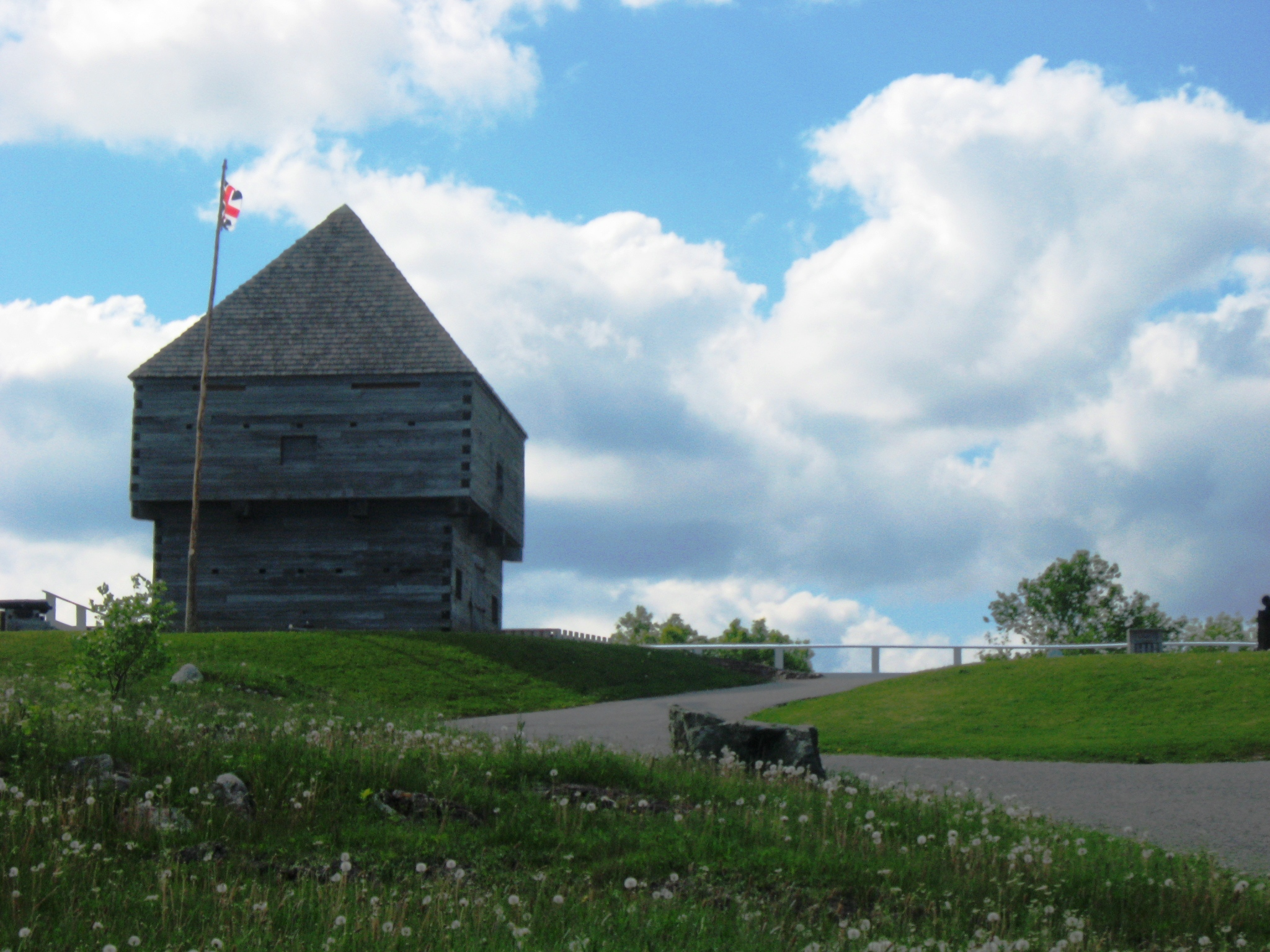
Fort Howe, Saint John, New Brunswick

Billopp along with his Loyalist father-in-law, Benjamin Seaman (who was also labeled a Loyalist felon) moved to Parrtown in New Brunswick in 1783. Parrtown and Carleton were two communities founded by Loyalists from America in the vicinity of Fort Howe. The two communities later merged to form the city of Saint John, New Brunswick. Benedict Arnold, the American revolutionary war loyalist, lived in Saint John from 1787 to 1791.

Billopp served in the New Brunswick Assembly and in 1796 was appointed to its council by King George III. In 1823, he was asked to become administrator for New Brunswick following the death of Lieutenant-Governor George Stracey Smyth but refused to come to Fredericton to take the oath of office. Ward Chipman took on this post instead although Billopp challenged this appointment.

== Marriage and children ==
Billopp was married twice. His first wife (licence issued November 2, 1762) was Francis Willett, born November 2, 1739, daughter of Thomas Willett and of Elizabeth Lawrence, their children;

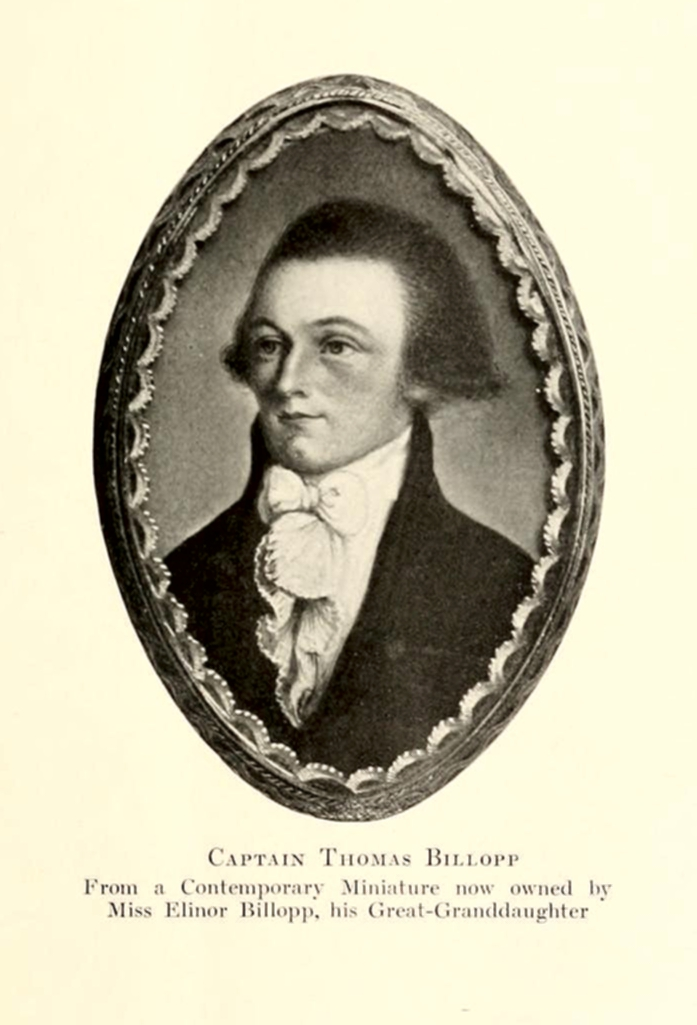
Captain Thomas Billopp

- Thomas Billopp (1767–1827), who married then moved to New York City and started a business venture with his brother John who would later die in a yellow fever epidemic. Thomas later sailed on an expedition to Venezuela on the Leander in 1806, in attempt orchestrated by Francisco de Miranda to start a revolution against Spanish rule in Venezuela. He was given the rank of captain in the revolutionary forces. He along with 60 others were captured by the Spanish on April 28, 1806, and hanged in Porto Caballo, Venezuela on July 26, 1806, where his name is inscribed on a monument in Plaza El Aguila along with other North Americans who died in the conflict with the Spanish Crown. His daughter Frances married William Edward Wyatt, and actress Jane Wyatt is one of their descendants.
- John Willett Billopp born in Staten Island, New York, baptized in St. Andrew's Church in Richmondtown, Staten Island, N.Y. on June 11, 1769, died in 1798 in New York City during a yellow fever epidemic.
- Elizabeth
- Sarah; born December 6, 1765, died 1811.
- Catherine born 1775, died August 28, 1839, married (February 3, 1807) John Black, brother of William Black, born 1764, died 1823:

His second wife (licence issued February 11, 1773) was Jane Seaman, born January 16, 1754, died January 21, 1802, in New Brunswick, Canada, daughter of Benjamin Seaman and Elizabeth Mott, their children;

- Louisa Billopp, who married United Empire Loyalist, John Wallace, Esq., Surveyor of Customs. Louisa's portrait was painted, c. 1816, by Robert Field (1769–1819) and was purchased by the Canadian government in 2006 from her descendant Kenneth Wallace.
- Mary Billopp, was born in 1790 and became the second wife of Rev. Archdeacon Willis of Nova Scotia and died on April 11, 1834, at Halifax, Nova Scotia, aged 43. Descendants include Andrew Willis, James Willis, Robin Willis, Nigel Willis, Tim Willis and Kenneth Christopher Thompson.
- Jane Billopp, died on June 6, 1836, wife of Hon. William Black of Saint John, a member of the Legislative and Executive Councils, and for a short time was administrator of the province.
- Anne; born in 1786, died February 9, 1872, in Saint John, New Brunswick.
- Katherine

== The peace conference ==
His former New York estate, built by his great-grandfather, was the site of a failed peace conference on September 11, 1776, between the Americans, John Adams, Benjamin Franklin and Edward Rutledge and the British, Lord Howe representing the crown. The house is a United States National Historic Landmark, known as the Conference House.

== Ghost legend ==
After his last release from patriot imprisonment Billopp went back to his manor house and confronted his servants. He was convinced that a 15-year-old servant girl had signaled his presence on the day of his kidnapping by holding a candle by a window on the second floor. This could be seen by the patriots perched in the steeple of St. Peter's Church in rebel controlled Perth Amboy. According to legend, Billopp caught her in the act of "signaling" to the patriots, and in a fit of rage, murdered her by throwing her down a flight of stairs. His ghost and that of the girl are said to haunt the Conference House, reenacting their deadly struggle.

== Gravestone inscription ==
His gravestone reads:

Sacred
to
the memory of
the Honorable
Christopher Billopp
A member of His Majesty's
council in this province, whose
uncompromising loyalty and
distinguished exertions as
a Lieu. Colonel, in the Royal
cause during the American
rebellion, obliged him at the
termination of that contest, to
abandon without compensation
his hereditary property on Staten
Island, and retire with his family
to this Colony, wherein he has since
resided universally respected.
He died on the 28, day of March
1827, in the 90th year

of his age.

== Bibliography ==
- Johnston, Henry P. (April 30, 2009). The Campaign of 1776 Around New York and Brooklyn. BiblioLife. ISBN 978-0-559-13433-3.
- Hale, R. Wallace (January 15, 2008). Early New Brunswick probate records, 1785–1835. Heritage Books. ISBN 978-1-55613-240-7.
