= Staten Island Peace Conference =

1776 diplomatic meeting between British and American leaders

Coordinates: 40°30′11″N 74°15′12″W

- Part of American Revolutionary War
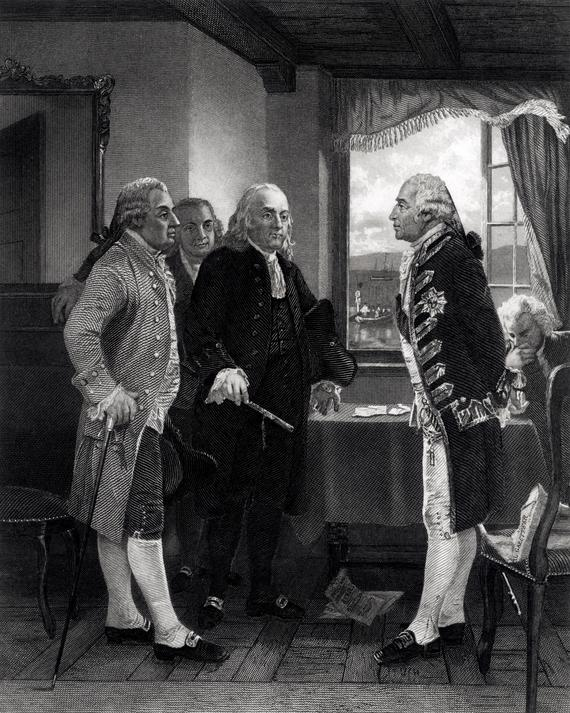
- Engraving of the conference by Alonzo Chappel
- Date: September 11, 1776
- Location: Billop Manor, Staten Island, New York
- Participants: British Crown: Lord Richard Howe; Second Continental Congress: John Adams; Benjamin Franklin; Edward Rutledge
- Outcome: Failure; negotiations broke down over British refusal to recognize American independence. British military campaign to capture New York City resumed.

The Staten Island Peace Conference was a brief informal diplomatic conference held between representatives of the British Crown and the United States in the hope of bringing an end to the American Revolutionary War. The conference took place on September 11, 1776, a few days after British forces captured Long Island and less than three months after the United States Declaration of Independence. The conference was held at Billop Manor, the Staten Island residence of Loyalist Christopher Billop. The participants were British Vice-Admiral of the White Richard Howe, Viscount Howe and members of the Second Continental Congress John Adams, Benjamin Franklin, and Edward Rutledge.

Upon being placed in command of British naval forces in North America, Howe had sought authority to resolve the conflict peacefully. However, his power to negotiate was by design extremely limited, which left the Congressional delegation pessimistic over a summary resolution. The American delegates insisted on recognition of their recently declared independence, which Howe was unable to grant. After just three hours, the delegates retired, and the British resumed their ultimately successful campaign to capture New York City.

== Background ==
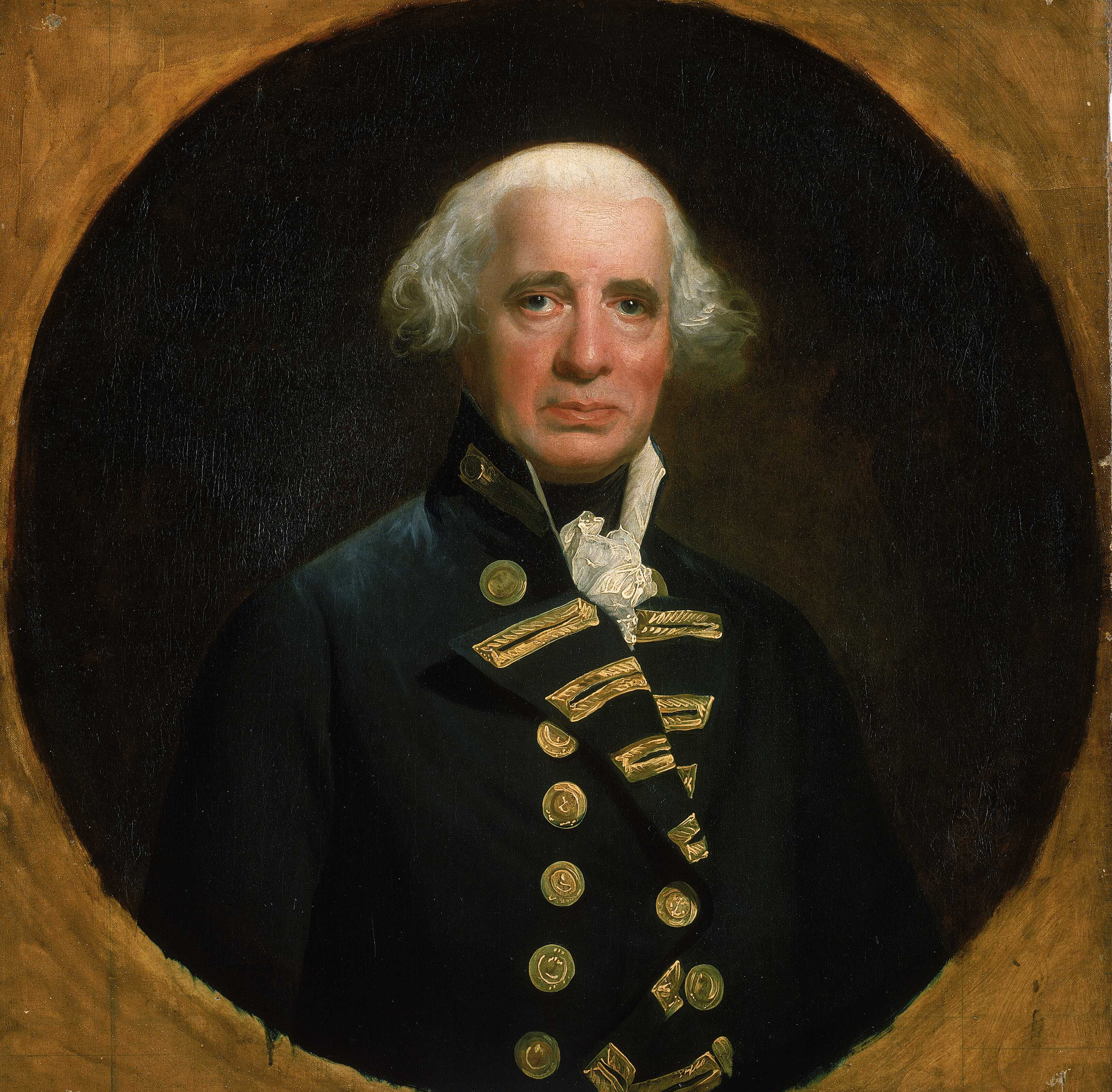
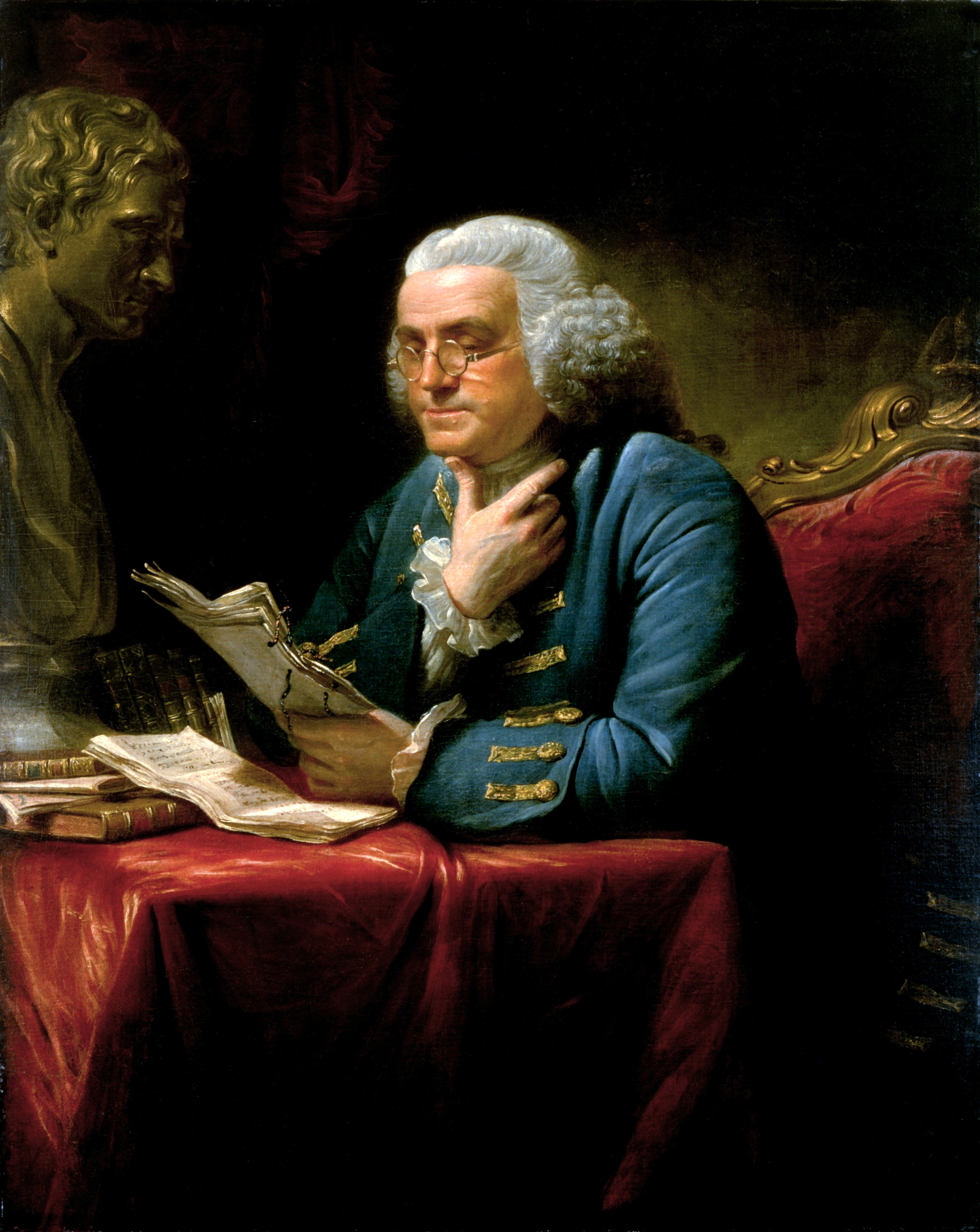
Lord Howe (left) proposed the conference and represented the British; Benjamin Franklin (right) and Howe had previously discussed colonial grievances.

When British authorities were planning how to deal with the ongoing rebellion in the Thirteen Colonies of British America in late 1775 and early 1776, they decided to send a large military expedition to occupy New York City. Two brothers, Vice-Admiral of the White Richard Howe, Viscount Howe and General William Howe, were given command of the naval and army contingents of the expedition respectively. Since they believed that it might still be possible to end the rebellion through negotiation, the brothers insisted on being granted diplomatic powers in addition to their military roles. Lord Howe had previously discussed colonial grievances informally with Benjamin Franklin in 1774 and 1775, without resolution. William Howe believed that the problem of colonial taxation could be resolved while maintaining the Parliament of Great Britain's supremacy over the colonies.

At first, George III reluctantly agreed to grant the Howes limited powers, but Secretary of State for the Colonies Lord Germain took a harder line by insisting for the brothers not to be given any powers that might be seen as giving in to the colonial demands for relief from taxation without representation or the so-called Intolerable Acts. As a consequence, the Howes were granted the ability only to issue pardons and amnesties, not to make any substantive concessions. The commissioners were also mandated to seek dissolution of the Continental Congress, the re-establishment of the pre-war colonial assemblies, the acceptance of the terms of British Prime Minister Lord North's Conciliatory Resolution regarding self-taxation, and the promise of a further discussion of colonial grievances. No concessions could be made unless hostilities were ended, and colonial assemblies made specific admissions of parliamentary supremacy.

== Prelude ==
After the British expedition arrived in North America in July 1776, Lord Howe made several attempts to open communications with General George Washington, the Continental Army's commander-in-chief. Two attempts to deliver letters to Washington were rebuffed because Howe had refused to recognize Washington's title. Washington, however, agreed to meet in person with one of Howe's adjutants, Colonel James Patterson. When Washington and Patterson met on July 20, the latter learned that the Howes' diplomatic powers were essentially limited to the granting of pardons; Washington responded that the Americans had not committed any faults and so did not need pardons.

Lord Howe subsequently sent a letter to Franklin that detailed a proposal for a truce and offers of pardons. After Franklin read the letter in Congress on July 30, he wrote back to Howe, "Directing pardons to be offered to the colonies, who are the very parties injured,... can have no other effect than that of increasing our resentments. It is impossible we should think of submission to a government that has with the most wanton barbarity and cruelty burnt our defenseless town,... excited the savages to massacre our peaceful farmers, and our slaves to murder their masters, and is even now bringing foreign mercenaries to deluge our settlements with blood." He also pointed out that "you once gave me expectations that reconciliation might take place." Howe was apparently somewhat taken aback by Franklin's forceful response.

"Some think it will occasion a delay of military operations; which we much want. I am not of that mind. Some think it will clearly throw the odium of continuing this war on his Lordship and his master. I wish it may. Others think it will silence the Tories and establish the timid Whigs. I wish this also, but do not expect it. All these arguments, and twenty others as mighty, would not have convinced me of the necessity, propriety, or utility, if Congress had not determined on it. I was against it from first to last. All sides agreed in sending me. You will hear more of this embassy. It will be famous enough."

— John Adams to James Warren, September 8, 1776

During the Battle of Long Island on August 27, 1776, British forces successfully occupied western Long Island, which compelled Washington to withdraw the Continental Army to Manhattan. William Howe then paused to consolidate his gains, and the brothers decided to make a diplomatic overture. During the battle, they had captured several high-ranking Continental Army officers, including Major General John Sullivan. The Howes managed to convince Sullivan that a conference with members of the Continental Congress might yield fruit and released him on parole to deliver a message to Congress in Philadelphia that proposed an informal meeting to discuss ending the war. After Sullivan's speech to Congress, John Adams cynically commented on this diplomatic attempt by calling Sullivan a "decoy-duck" and accusing the Howes of sending Sullivan "to seduce us into a renunciation of our independence." Others noted that it appeared to be an attempt to blame Congress for prolonging the war.

Congress, however, agreed to send three of its members (Adams, Franklin, and Edward Rutledge) to a conference with Lord Howe. They were instructed "to ask a few Questions and take [Howe's] Answers" but had no further authority. When Howe learned of the committee's limited authority, he briefly considered calling the meeting off but decided to proceed after he had discussed with his brother. None of the commissioners believed that the conference would amount to anything. Lord Howe initially sought to meet with the men as private citizens since British policy did not recognize Congress as a legitimate authority. For the conference to take place, he agreed to the American demand to be recognized as official representatives of Congress.

== Meeting ==
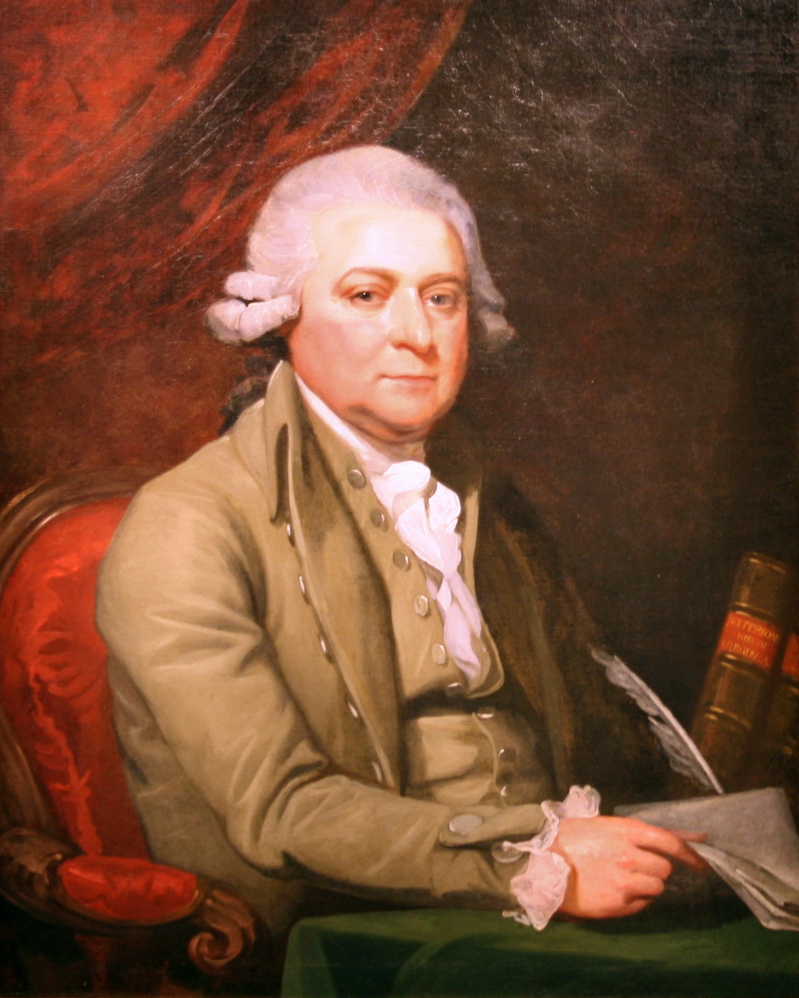
John Adams did not believe that the conference would succeed.

Billop Manor, the Staten Island residence of Loyalist Christopher Billop, was chosen as the meeting place. It had been occupied by British troops for use as a barracks and was in filthy condition, but one room was cleaned and prepared for the meeting. The arrangements included one British officer to be left on the American side as a hostage during the meeting. The congressional delegation, rather than leaving him behind the American lines, invited him to accompany them. On arrival, the delegation was escorted past a line of Hessian soldiers and into the house, where, according to Adams, a repast of claret, ham, mutton, and tongue was served.

The meeting lasted three hours, but the two sides were unable to find any common ground. The Americans insisted that any negotiations required the British recognition of the United States Declaration of Independence proclaimed on July 4. Lord Howe stated that he did not have the authority to meet that demand. When asked by Rutledge whether he had the authority to repeal the Prohibitory Act, which authorized a British naval blockade of the colonies, as had been claimed by Sullivan, Howe demurred and claimed that Sullivan was mistaken. Howe's authority included the ability to suspend its execution if the colonies agreed to make fixed contributions, instead of the taxes that Parliament had levied on them. None of that could be done unless the colonies first agreed to end hostilities.

For most of the meeting, both sides were cordial. However, when Howe expressed that he would feel America's loss "like the loss of a brother", Franklin informed him that "we will do our utmost endeavors to save your lordship that mortification." Howe unhappily stated that he could not view the American delegates as anything but British subjects. Adams replied, "Your lordship may consider me in what light you please,... except that of a British subject." Lord Howe then spoke past Adams to Franklin and Rutledge: "Mr. Adams appears to be a decided character."

== Aftermath ==
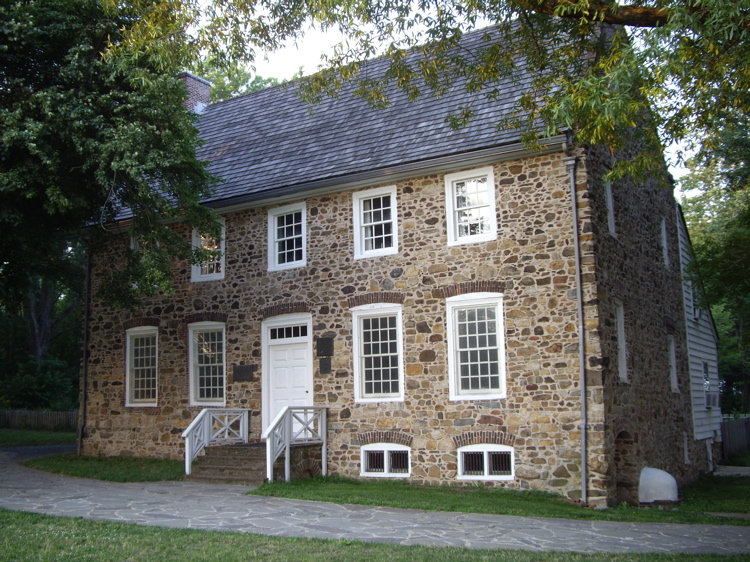
The Conference House

The Congressmen returned to Philadelphia and reported that Lord Howe "has no propositions to make us" and that "America is to expect nothing but total unconditional submission." Adams learned many years later that his name was on a list of people who were specifically excluded from any pardon offers the Howes might make. Congress published the committee's report without comment. Because Lord Howe did not also publish an account of the meeting, the meeting's outcome was perceived by many as a sign of British weakness, but many Loyalists and some British observers suspected that the Congressional report had misrepresented the meeting. One British commentator wrote of the meeting: "They met, they talked, they parted. And now nothing remains but to fight it out." Lord Howe reported the failure of the conference to his brother, and both made preparations to continue the campaign for New York City. Four days after the conference, British troops landed on Manhattan and occupied New York City.

British parliamentary debate over the terms of the diplomatic mission and its actions prompted some Whig members of Parliament essentially to boycott parliamentary proceedings. The next major peace effort occurred in 1778, when the British sent the Carlisle Peace Commission led by Lord Carlisle to British-occupied Philadelphia. They were authorized to treat with Congress as a body and offered self-government that was roughly equivalent to dominion status. The effort was undermined by the planned withdrawal of British troops from Philadelphia and by American demands that the commissioners were not authorized to grant. The house in which the Staten Island conference took place is now preserved as a museum within Conference House Park, a city park. It is a National Historic Landmark, and is listed on the National Register of Historic Places.
