= Richmond County Family Court =

Small courthouse in Staten Island in New York City

Coordinates: 40.645014°N 74.077871°W

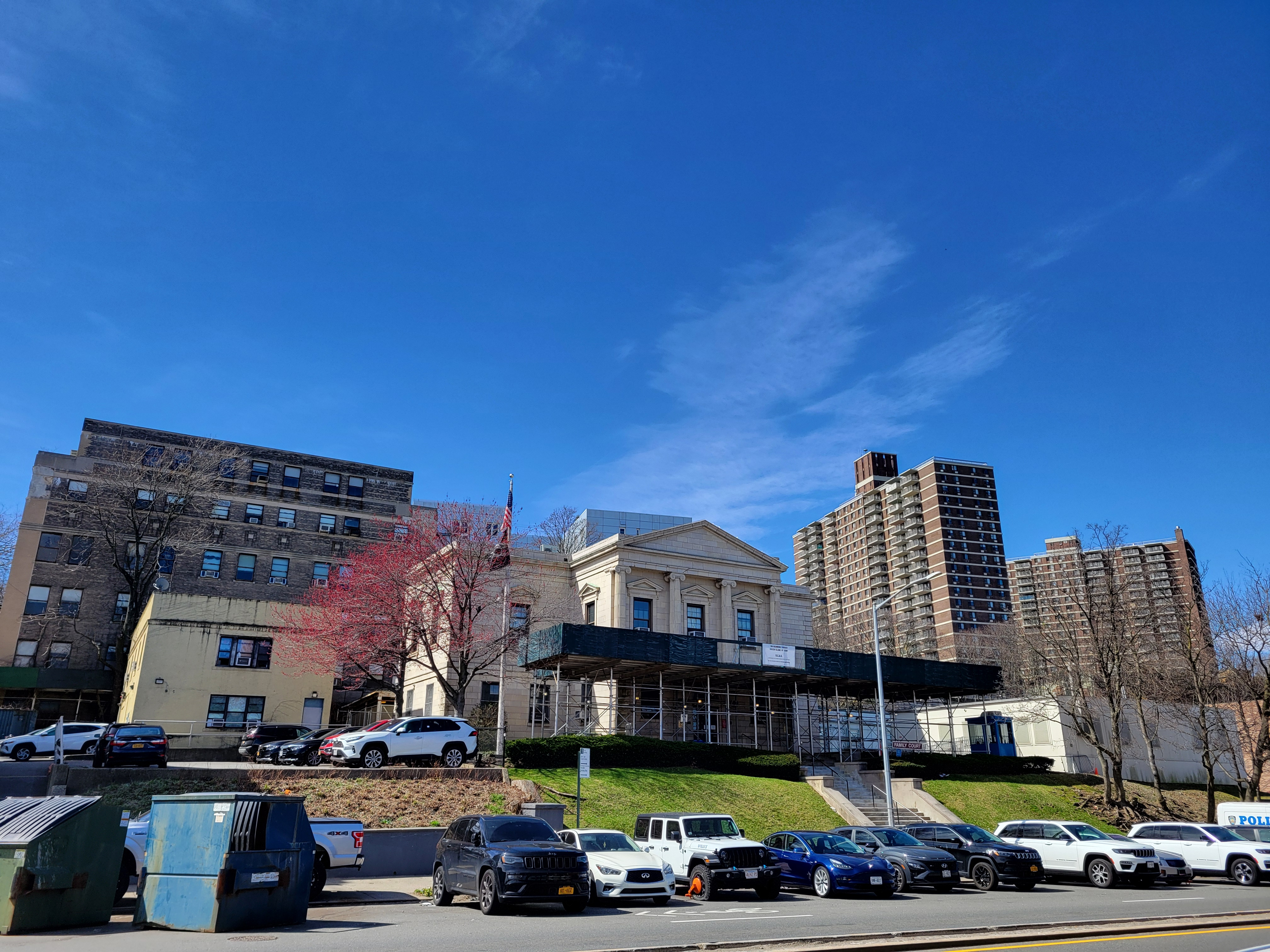
Richmond County Family Court, viewed from across the street in March 2024

The Richmond County Family Court building is a small courthouse in the St. George neighborhood of the borough of Staten Island in New York City. It houses Family Court for Richmond County, which is coextensive with Staten Island.

The building overlooks New York Harbor at 100 Richmond Terrace, just west of other municipal buildings in the St. George civic center, including Borough Hall, the fourth Richmond County Courthouse and the local police precinct building. The neoclassical building with a terracotta exterior was built in 1931 by Sibley and Featherston as the Staten Island Children's Court. The same firm built Staten Island's Civil Court and Criminal Court buildings during the same period.

Adjoining the court building are two annexes. Some functions associated with the court are also conducted in other nearby buildings. As of 2014 there are three Family Court Judges on Staten Island, one of whom works in one of the annexes. There is a Legal Aid Society office in the basement.

Accessibility for persons with disabilities is via a ramp at the rear entrance.
