= St. George, Staten Island =

Neighborhood in New York City

St. George
- Neighborhood of Staten Island
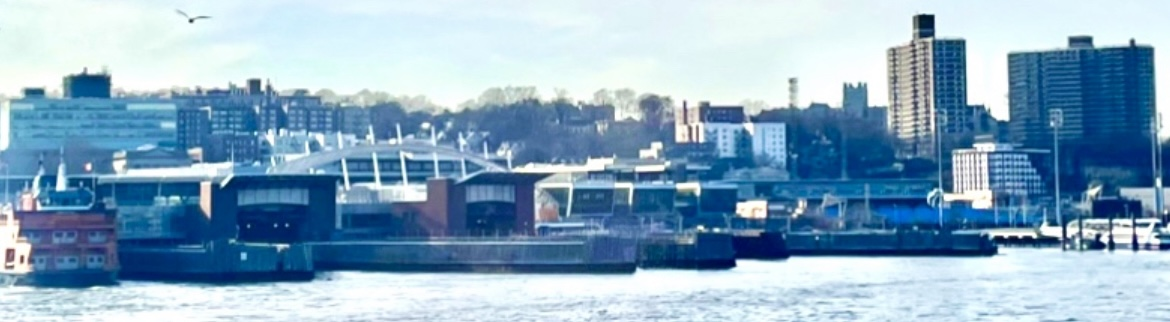
- Skyline of St. George
- Location in New York City
- Coordinates: 40.643°N 74.079°W
- Country: United States
- State: New York
- City: New York City
- Borough: Staten Island
- Community District: Staten Island 1

Area
  - Total: 0.412 sq mi (1.07 km^{2})

Population (2011)
  - Total: 8,662
  - Density: 21,000/sq mi (8,120/km^{2})

Economics
  - Median income: $46,646
- Time zone: UTC−5 (Eastern)
  - Summer (DST): UTC−4 (EDT)
- ZIP Codes: 10301
- Area code: 718, 347, 929, and 917

St. George is a neighborhood on the northeastern tip of Staten Island in New York City, along the waterfront where the Kill Van Kull enters Upper New York Bay. It is the most densely developed neighborhood on Staten Island, and the location of the administrative center for the borough and for the coterminous Richmond County. The St. George Terminal, serving the Staten Island Ferry and the Staten Island Railway, is also located here. St. George is bordered on the south by the neighborhood of Tompkinsville and on the west by the neighborhood of New Brighton.

What is now St. George was initially occupied by the Lenape Native Americans, then colonized by the Dutch and the British. The first residential developments arose in the 1830s, and through the late 19th century, the area was a summer resort. Until the construction of the ferry–railroad terminal in 1886, present-day St. George was considered to be part of New Brighton. The section around the current ferry and railroad terminal was renamed after developer George Law, whom Erastus Wiman promised to "canonize" in exchange for relinquishing the land rights for the terminal. Several government buildings and landmarks were constructed in St. George in the early 20th century, and further developments on the waterfront commenced in the early 21st century.

St. George is part of Staten Island Community District 1. St. George is patrolled by the 120th Precinct of the New York City Police Department.

== History ==
=== Precolonial and colonial period ===
Originally, Staten Island was inhabited by the Munsee-speaking Lenape Native Americans. The Lenape relocated during different seasons, moving toward the shore to fish during the summers, and moving inland to hunt and grow crops during the fall and winter. The present-day area of New York City was inhabited in 1624 by Dutch settlers as part of New Netherland. In 1664, the Dutch gave New Netherland to the British, and six years later the British finalized a purchase agreement with the Lenape.

At the time of British handover, several British, Dutch, and French settlers occupied the area, but did not have an established title to the land. A series of surveys were conducted through 1677, and several parcels were distributed to different landowners. Among them were the 340-acre (140 ha) "Duxbury Glebe", given to Ellis Duxbury in 1708, bequeathed to the Protestant Episcopal Church of St. Andrew's ten years later, and then leased for 54 years by John Bard in 1765. Another tract was granted to Lambert Jansen Dorlant in 1680, whose western boundary was a brook on present-day Jersey Street. By 1748, it had been purchased by Salmon Comes, who ran a ferry to Manhattan. By 1765, part of the Dorlant tract was owned by John Wandel, a molasses distiller who operated a plant at the Kill Van Kull near Richmond Terrace and Westervelt Avenue, taking advantage of the Jersey Street brook. Two Native American roads intersected near the distiller: Shore Road (today's Richmond Terrace) on the North Shore, and a road that wound southward on St. Marks Place and then Hamilton and Westervelt Avenues.

Fort Hill, one of the hills overlooking the harbor, was the location on Duxbury's Point or Ducksberry Point, fortified by the British during the American Revolutionary War. Hessian troops, contracted by the British, were stationed near the Jersey Street brook, which then became known as Hessian Springs. After the end of the war, the area remained primarily rural through the early 19th century. The area became part of the town of Castleton upon the town's incorporation in 1788. The New York state government took 30 acres (12 ha) of Duxbury Glebe in 1799, upon which it established the New York Marine Hospital (also "The Quarantine"), a contagious disease hospital. The state then gave 5 acres (2.0 ha) to the federal government for the U.S. Light-House Depot Complex, a lighthouse facility.

=== 19th century ===
==== Early ownership ====
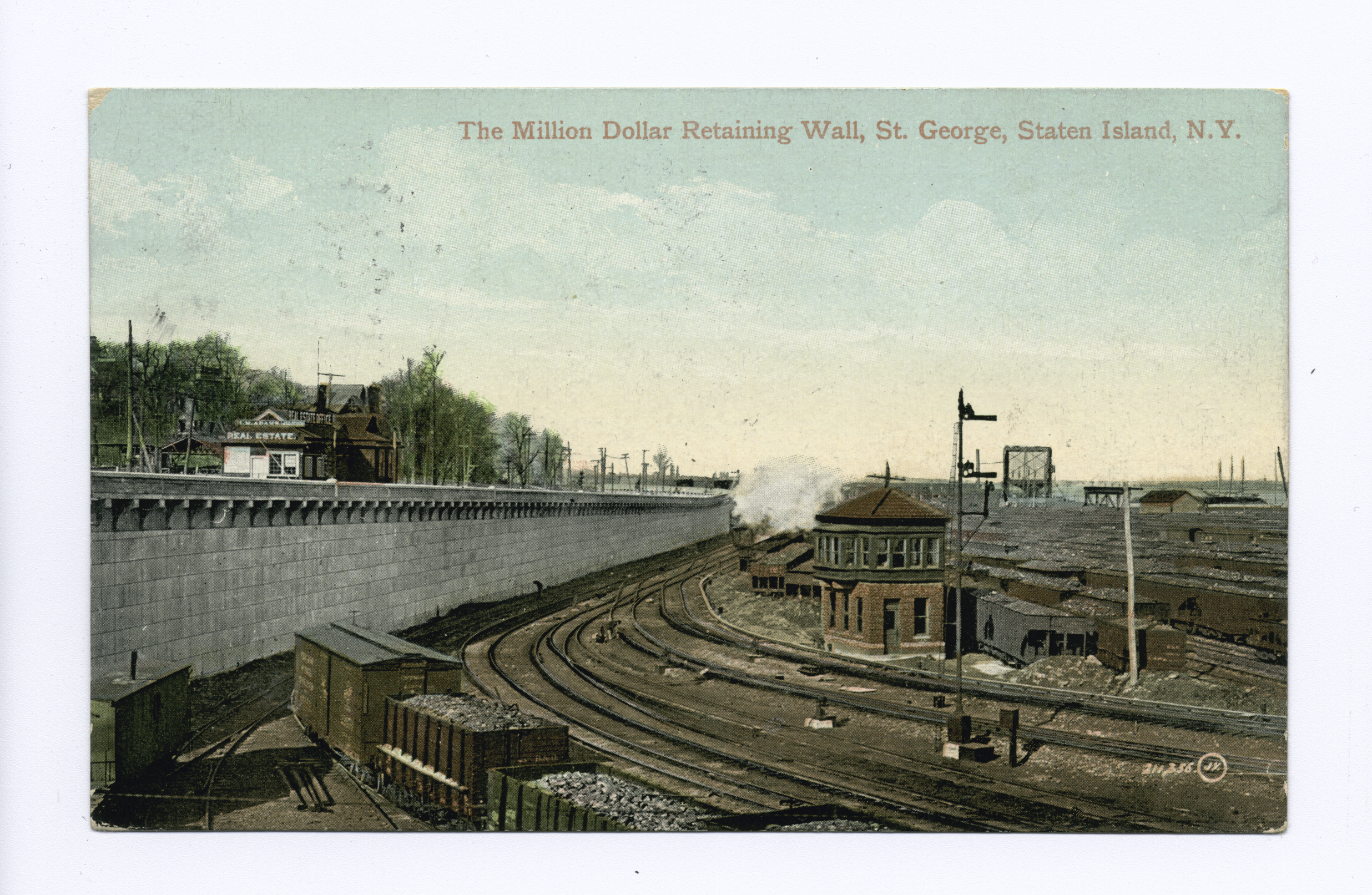
"The Million Dollar Retaining Wall, St. George, Staten Island"

Among the first people to promote the widespread development of Staten Island was former U.S. vice president Daniel D. Tompkins, who purchased land in the northern part of Staten Island in the early 1810s. Tompkins purchased Abraham Crocheron's farm, located on present-day Jersey Street south of Richmond Terrace, in 1814. The next year, he acquired 700 acres (280 ha) from St. Andrew's Church, and two years after that, he bought Philip Van Buskirk's land claim, located between the two disconnected pieces of land. Tompkins also incorporated the Richmond Turnpike Company to build present-day Victory Boulevard in 1816, started operating a ferry to Manhattan in 1817, and laid out the adjacent village of Tompkinsville for development between 1819 and 1821. Tompkins then expanded the Van Buskirks' old farmhouse, using it as his primary residence. He died in 1825.

Tompkins's property within present-day St. George was sold in April 1834 to Manhattan developer Thomas E. Davis, who continued to buy land through the following year. Davis came to own all the land on Staten Island's northeastern shore, bounded to the south by Victory Boulevard, to the west by Sailors' Snug Harbor, and to the north and east by the waterfront. He planned to develop the area into a summer retreat called New Brighton, renaming Shore Road to Richmond Terrace, and the first five Greek Revival summer bungalows were erected in 1835. Davis sold the development to a five-person syndicate for $600,000 in 1836, and the New Brighton Association was incorporated that April. The area on the northeast shore, including present-day St. George, thus came to be called New Brighton.

==== Increasing development ====
Development on the New Brighton street grid proceeded according to a plan that surveyor James Lyons had created in 1835. Streets were arranged around existing topography. When the New Brighton Association laid out streets in northeastern Staten Island, many of these roads were named after notable politicians, with such names as Hamilton Avenue, Jay Street, and Madison Street. Other streets were named after people or places that were associated with the development of the area, including Tompkins, Davis, or the Stuyvesant family (who were early investors). For instance, St. Marks Place was named after Davis's developments on St. Marks Place in Manhattan, while Westervelt Avenue was named after Tompkins's son-in-law. Several of these street names replaced preexisting appellations.

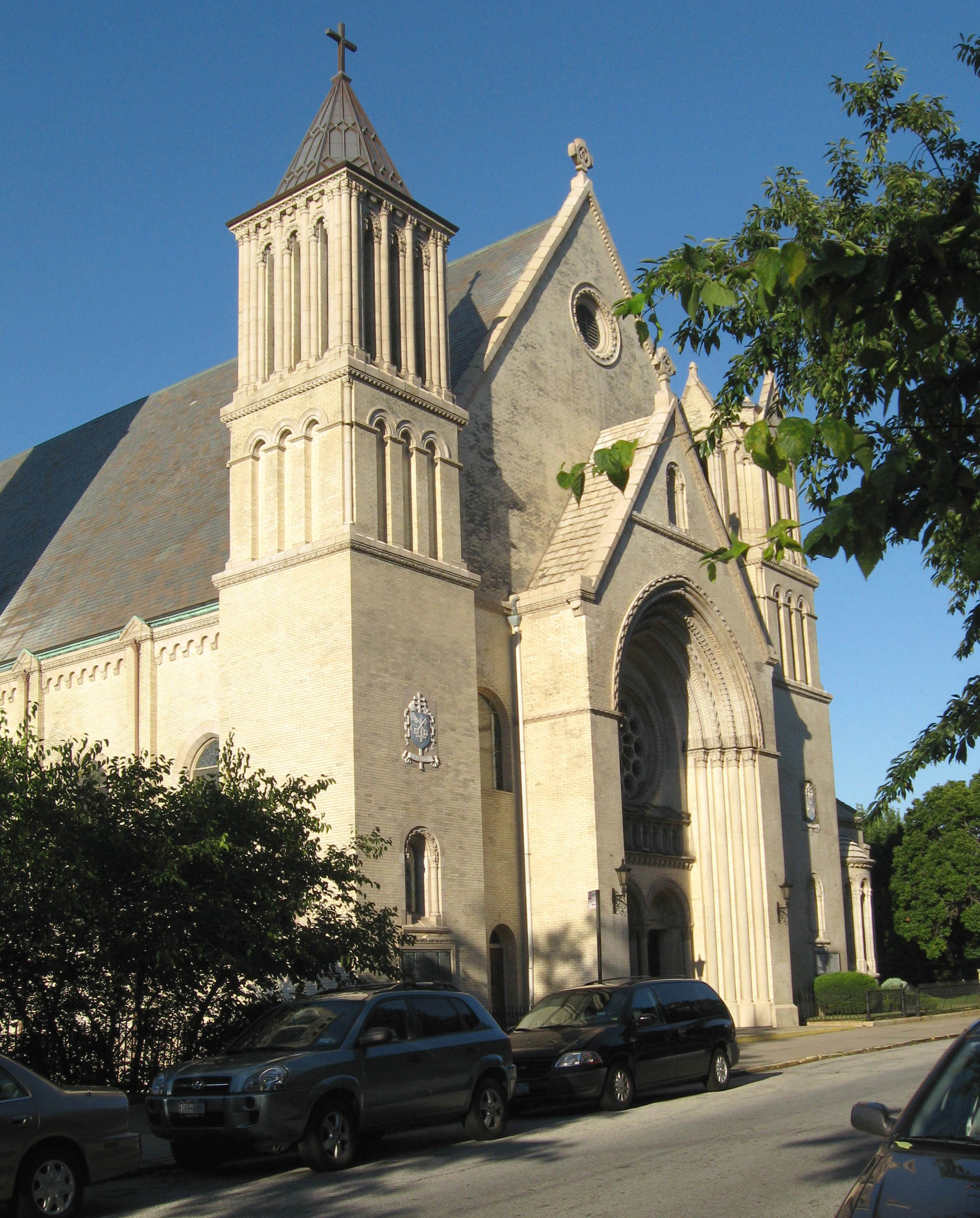
St. Peter's Church

Work on the street grid and development of the land continued, but in March 1837, one major investor declared bankruptcy following the Panic of 1837. The same year, the Pavilion Hotel opened in a mansion along the shore, being converted from a residence. The association continued to lay out streets. However, in 1840, four of the five original New Brighton Association investors' properties were foreclosed upon. The foreclosed lots were thus repurchased by Thomas E. Davis in 1844. According to a survey conducted the following year, several streets had been laid out in modern-day St. George, including Carroll Place, Hamilton Avenue, St. Marks Place, Richmond Terrace, and numerous smaller streets. Most development was on the waterfront, where there were mansions with carriage buildings, as well as smaller homes and the Pavilion Hotel. St. Peter's Church on Carroll Street was dedicated in 1844 as the island's first Roman Catholic house of worship.

By the 1840s and 1850s, New Brighton began to develop into a summer resort area. In addition to the existing Pavilion, hotels in modern-day New Brighton included the Peteler (later St. Marks) Hotel, as well as the Belmont Hotel. Additionally, new houses such as Italianate villas were built, while existing Richmond Terrace mansions were expanded or received new annexes and gardens. Several greenhouses were also built in the neighborhood, particularly on the land of the merchant John C. Green, part of whose estate is now the site of Curtis High School. The silk printer John Crabtree established a printing plant for his company, Crabtree and Wilkinson, on the eastern bank of the Jersey Street brook in 1844. The factory had over 180 workers and a small residential and commercial community by 1853, and the establishment of similar factories led to the population of New Brighton doubling between 1840 and 1860.

In 1858, angry Staten Island residents burned down the Quarantine in what became known as the Staten Island Quarantine War. Three years afterward, the onset of the American Civil War resulted in large changes to the neighborhood's land use. Initially, the local economy suffered due to cessation of trade with the Southern United States, but because of the Union Army's demand for material, many entrepreneurs and workers moved to New York City, including to Staten Island's North Shore. According to a 1865 article from the Richmond County Gazette, "the demand for dwelling houses upon the island has never before been equalled." During this time, many new houses were designed in the Second Empire style and/or as duplexes, particularly on as-yet-undeveloped plots along Westervelt Avenue or St. Marks Place. The end of the Civil War, cheaper building materials, and technological improvements resulted in an increase in real estate prices on the North Shore, and by the early 1870s, the area was described as being prosperous, with real estate in high demand.

The Panic of 1873 resulted in a near-cessation of building activity on the North Shore. By the late 1870s, industries had started to move to the area again, such as J. B. King and Company, whose plaster mill opened in 1877. A water system was established upon the Staten Island Water Supply Company's 1879 incorporation, and a sewage system was added between 1884 and 1890.

==== Renaming and late 19th century ====
In the 1880s, the area closest to the ferry terminals on the northeastern shore became known as "St. George", after developer George Law, who acquired rights to the New Brighton waterfront at bargain prices. According to island historians Charles Leng and William T. Davis, the businessman Erastus Wiman, who was expanding the Staten Island Railway to New Brighton, promised to "canonize" Law if the latter agreed to relinquish the land rights for a new railroad–ferry terminal there. St. George was selected for the terminal due to the site being the closest point from Staten Island to Manhattan, approximately a 5-mile (8.0 km) distance. The St. George Terminal opened in early 1886. It was served by a Staten Island Ferry route to Manhattan's Whitehall Terminal, as well as three routes of the Staten Island Railway: the North Shore Branch to Elm Park station (later to New Jersey), the East Shore Branch to Tottenville station, and the South Beach Branch to South Beach station.

With the completion of the Staten Island Railway, Wiman's Staten Island Amusement Company started operating locations in both St. George and Erastina (now Mariners Harbor). The St. George location opened in 1886 and included an illuminated fountain, as well as public events and competitions, a 60-piece military band, and the St. George Cricket Grounds. The fountain was removed from the site by 1887, and the amusements in St. George ceased to exist by 1889. The grandest and last hotel of St. George and New Brighton was the Hotel Castleton, built in 1889 and destroyed by fire in 1907.

The completion of new transportation options also resulted in further real estate development, especially around the areas close to New Brighton and St. George stations. Developers such as John M. Pendleton and Anson Phelps Stokes constructed cottages and houses in the northern part of St. George, while existing property owners expanded their properties. Many newer houses, meanwhile, were designed in the Queen Anne, Shingle, and Colonial Revival styles. In 1898, Staten Island was consolidated with New York City, and this move accelerated development of the region. At this time immigrant groups settled in New Brighton in greater numbers; Italians and African-Americans along the Kill Van Kull, and Jewish communities on the eastern boundary of the village near St. George and Tompkinsville. George Cromwell, the first Staten Island borough president following the unification of New York City, decided to move the Richmond county capital from Richmondtown to St. George, citing its convenience to Manhattan.

=== 20th century ===
==== Post-unification development ====
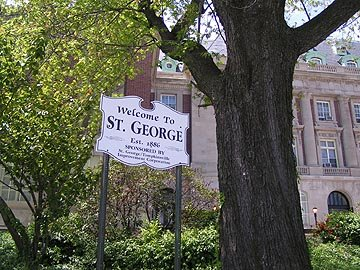
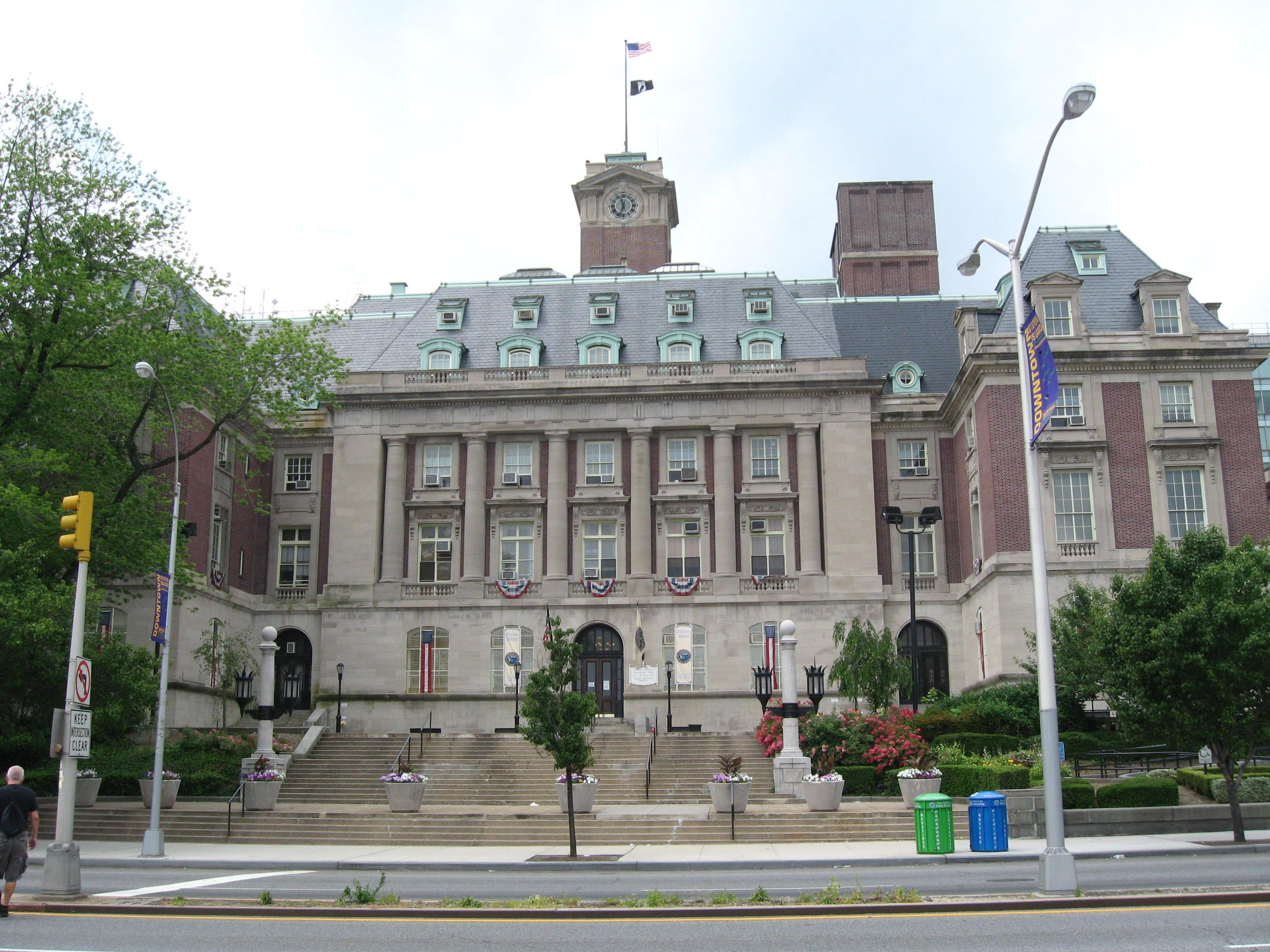
Borough Hall

In the years after unification, the North Shore became quickly urbanized, and the political and economic center of Staten Island shifted to the region. Development of St. George turned mostly to residential and commercial uses by the 1900s. Several government buildings were also built in the area because of Cromwell's decision to make St. George the primary civic center for Staten Island. The area's first secondary school, Curtis High School, opened in 1904. The ferry service to Whitehall Terminal was transferred to municipal operation the following year. Subsequently, St. George became more urbanized due to easy access to the ferry, and because of its consolidation with New York City. By 1912, electric streetlights were being installed, and various commercial and government buildings were being erected in St. George. Other city services were also brought to Staten Island following unification, such as schools, emergency facilities, new roads, and utilities including an underground water supply.

The architectural firm of Carrère and Hastings developed several buildings in St. George, including the St. George Library Center of the New York Public Library (1907), the present Staten Island Borough Hall (1906), and the Richmond County Courthouse (1919). The Staten Island Museum moved to its present location in the neighborhood in 1918. The 120th Police Precinct building on Richmond Terrace was finished in 1923, resulting in the consolidation of three former New York City Police Department precincts on the North Shore. Other notable buildings developed in St. George during the 1920s and 1930s include the St. George Theatre (1927), the Staten Island Federal Office Building (1931), the Richmond County Family Court (1931), and the Staten Island Savings Bank (1936). Development of buildings in St. George increased following World War I, with one person stating that Stuyvesant Place "look[ed] like a ravine" due to the pace of new residential construction. The New York Herald said in 1919 that "In St. George are excellent public and private schools as well as churches, stores and modern apartment buddings."

The Staten Island Tunnel, a railroad/rapid transit tunnel to Brooklyn, was proposed in 1912 in conjunction with the Dual Contracts of the New York City Subway. It was hoped that the completion of the tunnel would spur the development of inner Staten Island and St. George, as a trip to Manhattan via the tunnel was expected to take only 12 to 15 minutes, compared to 25 on the ferry. However, after several delays and a groundbreaking in 1923, the project was canceled in 1925. Another plan for an expanded ferry terminal with a 26-story office complex was proposed in 1930, but never built.

==== Later 20th century ====
As early as 1919, "St. George" was used to describe the northeastern waterfront of Staten island as well as the hills immediately adjacent to the ferry terminal. By the 1930s, the "St. George" name had come to generally describe the northeastern corner of Staten Island, including what was formerly known as New Brighton. Around this time, many of the older housing stock in St. George were converted to small apartment buildings. The U.S. Light-House Depot Complex was turned over to the United States Coast Guard in 1936. After a fire burned down the St. George Terminal in 1946, a rebuilt terminal opened in 1951 with a parking lot, new ferry slips, and improved connections to buses and the railroad.

By the 1960s, office space was being developed around Bay Street. The opening of the Verrazzano–Narrows Bridge in 1964 created a connection between Staten Island and the rest of New York City that did not require passing through St. George, and led to the development of neighborhoods further inland. Furthermore, the Coast Guard complex closed in 1965, its operations being moved to Governors Island. By the 1970s, there was a decline in demand for St. George's residential stock. Only one project was completed on the North Shore waterfront in that decade, a 440-unit apartment building near the ferry terminal. Developer William Zeckendorf and materials company Alcoa had jointly proposed a 27-story residential complex on the waterfront about 600 feet (180 m) south of the terminal, replacing ten industrial buildings formerly used by the American Dock Company. However, the site remained unused until 1981, when construction started on a smaller development called the Bay Street Landing. Further inland, St. George was mostly composed of single-family housing situated amid the area's steep topography and winding roads. Several parcels, such as the former Daniel Low Terrace, lay undeveloped.

=== Revival ===
The community underwent a revival starting in the late 1980s, when a group of developers proposed the St. George Seaport at Brighton, a $750 million retail and commercial complex based on Manhattan's South Street Seaport. Redevelopment of the area continued through the 1990s. In 1994, the New York City Landmarks Preservation Commission designated the St. George Historic District, which includes 78 houses and St. Peter's Church. The Brighton Heights Reformed Church, a city and national landmark in St. George, burned down in 1996 and was rebuilt three years later. By the late 1990s and early 2000s, younger families were starting to move to St. George, since housing in the neighborhood was cheaper compared to in the rest of the city.

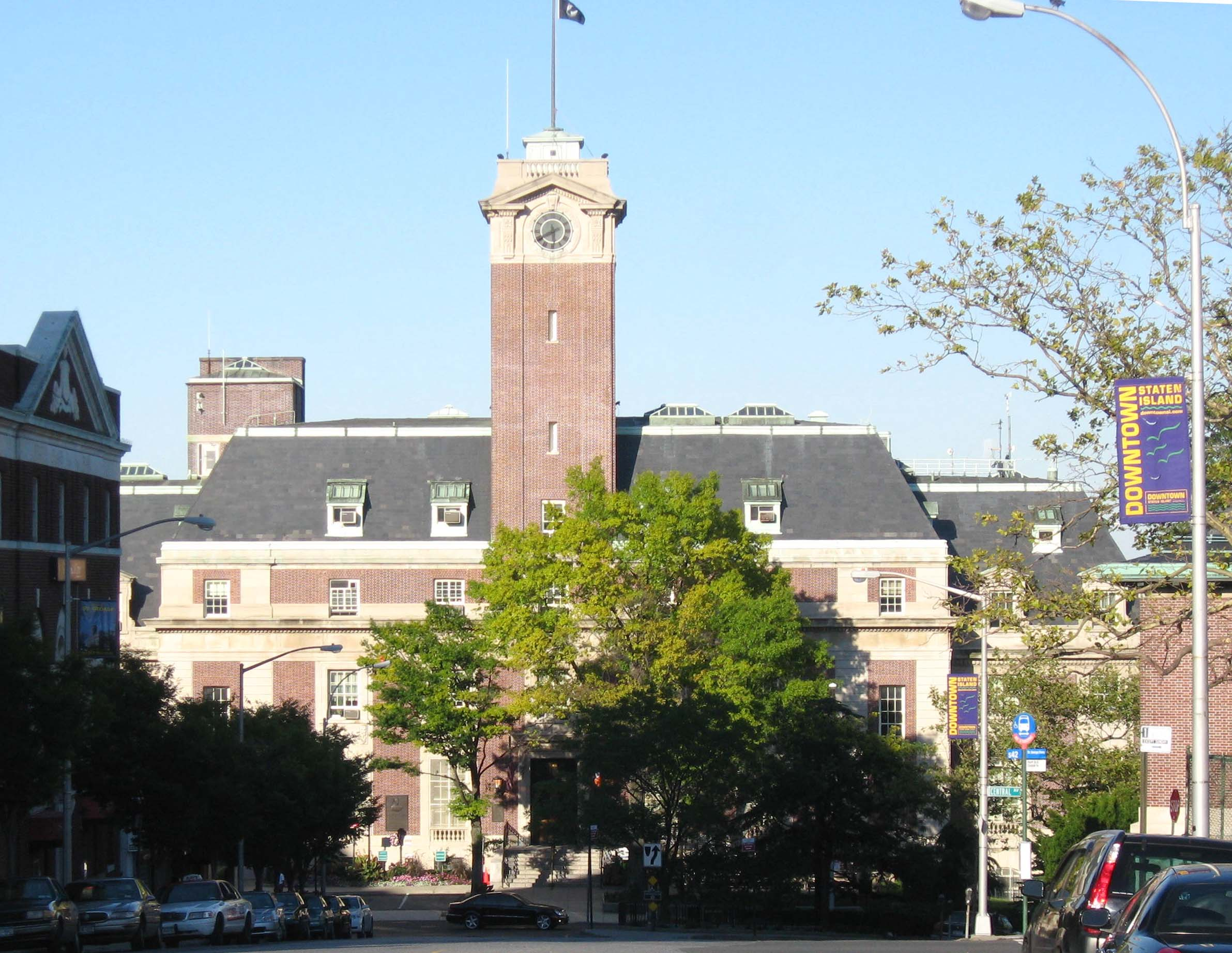
Hyatt Street, prior to conversion into piazza

In the first decade of the 21st century, several prominent structures in St. George were renovated or opened. The first of these was Richmond County Bank Ballpark (now named SIUH Community Park) which opened in 2001 along with an adjacent waterfront promenade. This was followed by the reopening of the St. George Theater in 2004, the opening of the Postcards 9/11 memorial in 2004, and the renovation of the ferry terminal in 2005. By the mid-2000s, new development was starting to cluster on the waterfront near the ferry terminal. In 2007, several media reports noted that artists and musicians were moving to Staten Island's North Shore so they could be near Manhattan but afford more space to live and work. However, residential development slowed following the 2008 financial crisis. Further improvements came to St. George in 2008 when a zoning district called the Special St. George District was designated by the New York City Department of City Planning. The following year, Pier 1 was renovated to create a public space with a fishing pier.

Development on the shore and on Bay Street continued through the 2010s. The National Lighthouse Museum opened in 2015, and the Empire Outlets mall opened in May 2019. Another large project to draw visitors to St. George, the New York Wheel, was canceled in 2018 over delays and rising costs. Lighthouse Point, located south of St. George Terminal, was expected to open in late 2019, but was delayed to 2025. The city government announced the North Shore Action Plan in 2023, which included various improvements in St. George, Tompkinsville, and Stapleton. In St. George, these would include a redevelopment of the Wheel site, a promenade, upgrades to Empire Outlets and SIUH Community Park, and improved access to St. George Terminal.

== Demographics ==
For census purposes, the New York City Department of City Planning classifies St. George as part of a larger Neighborhood Tabulation Area called St. George-New Brighton SI0101. This designated neighborhood had 20,549 inhabitants based on data from the 2020 United States Census. This was an increase of 1,775 persons (9.5%) from the 18,774 counted in 2010. The neighborhood had a population density of 33.0 inhabitants per acre (14,500/sq mi; 5,600/km^{2}).

The racial makeup of the neighborhood was 21.4% (4,394) White (Non-Hispanic), 31.9% (6,561) Black (Non-Hispanic), 7.2% (1,471) Asian, and 5.3% (1,074) from two or more races. Hispanic or Latino of any race were 34.3% (7,049) of the population.

According to the 2020 United States Census, this area has many cultural communities of over 1,000 inhabitants. This include residents who identify as Mexican, Puerto Rican, Irish, Italian, and African-American.

The largest age group was people 25-39 years old, which made up 22% of the residents. 59.6% of the households had at least one family present. Out of the 7,732 households, 27.8% had a married couple (10.8% with a child under 18), 6.6% had a cohabiting couple (2.3% with a child under 18), 24.7% had a single male (2% with a child under 18), and 40.9% had a single female (11.3% with a child under 18). 31.1% of households had children under 18. In this neighborhood, 70.2% of non-vacant housing units are renter-occupied.

The entirety of Community District 1, which comprises St. George and other neighborhoods on the North Shore, had 181,484 inhabitants as of NYC Health's 2018 Community Health Profile, with an average life expectancy of 79.0 years. This is lower than the median life expectancy of 81.2 for all New York City neighborhoods. Most inhabitants are youth and middle-aged adults: 24% are between the ages of between 0–17, 27% between 25 and 44, and 26% between 45 and 64. The ratio of college-aged and elderly residents was lower, at 10% and 13% respectively.

As of 2017, the median household income in Community District 1 was $48,018. In 2018, an estimated 21% of St. George and the North Shore residents lived in poverty, compared to 17% in all of Staten Island and 20% in all of New York City. One in fourteen residents (7%) were unemployed, compared to 6% in Staten Island and 9% in New York City. Rent burden, or the percentage of residents who have difficulty paying their rent, is 51% in St. George and the North Shore, compared to the boroughwide and citywide rates of 49% and 51% respectively. Based on this calculation, as of 2018, St. George and the North Shore are considered high-income relative to the rest of the city and not gentrifying.

== Political representation ==
In the United States House of Representatives, St. George is located within New York's 11th congressional district. St. George is also part of the 23rd State Senate district and the 61st Assembly district. In the New York City Council, St. George is part of District 49.

== Buildings and structures ==
=== Government structures ===
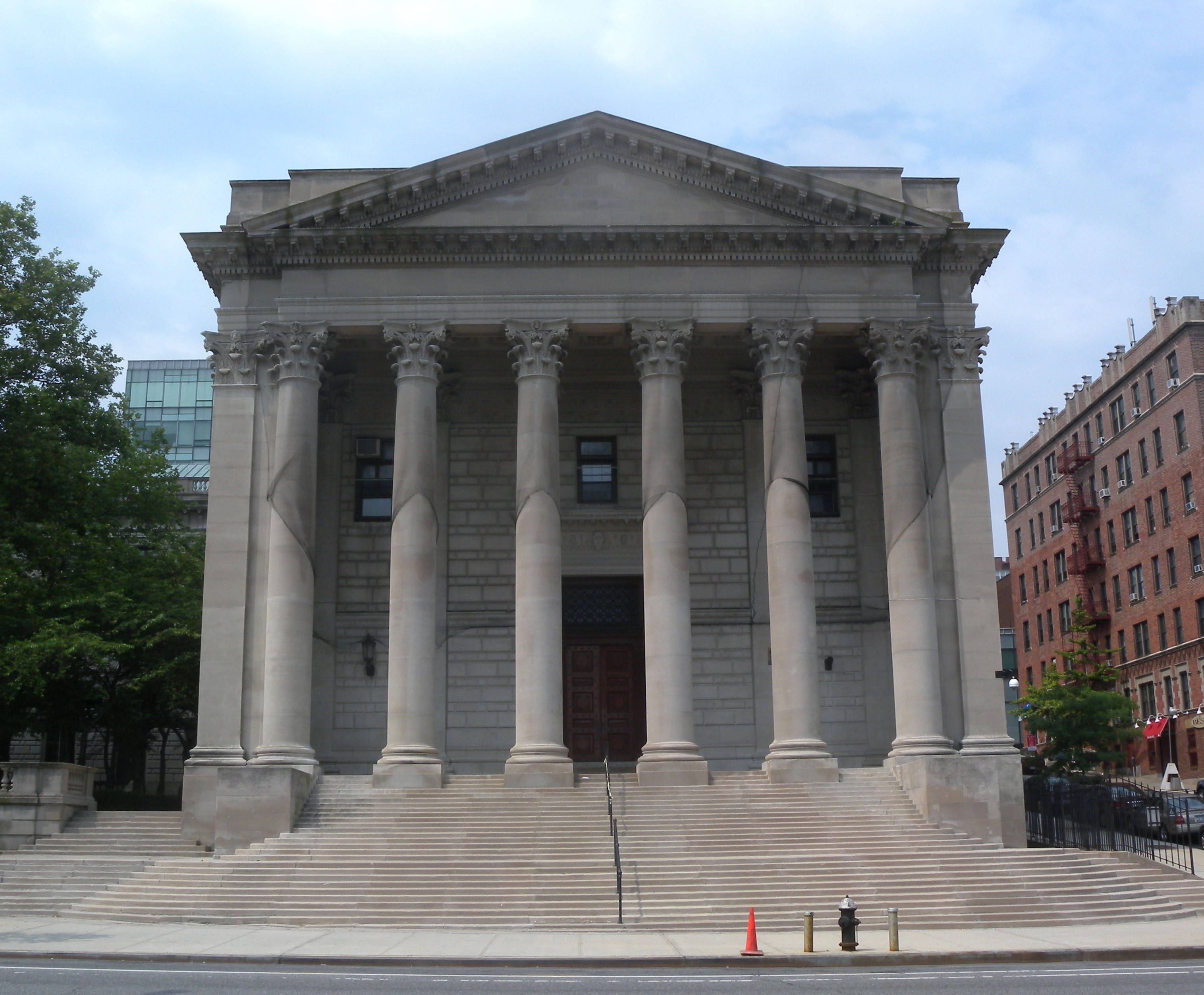
Richmond County Courthouse

St. George contains several structures that serve judicial or executive functions for the Staten Island borough government. The Staten Island Borough Hall, at 2–10 Richmond Terrace, was built in 1906 and was designed by Carrère and Hastings in the French Renaissance style. Adjacent to it is the former Richmond County Courthouse at 12–24 Richmond Terrace, built in 1919 and also designed by Carrère and Hastings, though in the Neoclassical style. One block northwest is the Richmond County Family Court, originally the Staten Island Family Courthouse, a Neoclassical structure at 100 Richmond Terrace designed by Sibley & Fetherston and completed in 1931. A structure for the New York City Department of Health and Mental Hygiene, designed in the Art Deco style, is located on Hamilton Avenue. The present Richmond County Supreme Court, at 26 Central Avenue, opened in 2015 after more than a decade of construction and planning.

The United States Coast Guard operated the Office Building and U.S. Light-House Depot Complex until 1965. It was the major center for lighthouse supply, maintenance and experimentation for nearly 150 years. The site consists of 10 acres (40,000 m^{2}) of waterfront property with five historic USLHS buildings, a public plaza and an 850-foot (260 m) pier.

Additionally, the Staten Island Federal Office Building at 45 Bay Street is an Art Deco limestone building completed in 1931. It includes the neighborhood's post office. The Staten Island Savings Bank at 13-15 Hyatt Street was built in 1936 in the Federal style.

The New York City Landmarks Preservation Commission has designated the Staten Island Borough Hall, Richmond County Courthouse, Richmond County Family Court, and the Office Building of the U.S. Coast Guard Station as official city landmarks. The Staten Island Borough Hall. Richmond County Courthouse, and USCG Station office building were also listed on the National Register of Historic Places in 1983.

=== Religious structures ===
The Brighton Heights Reformed Church, located at 320 St. Marks Place, was protected as a NRHP site and as a city landmark in 1982 and 1967, respectively. The original church burned down in an accidental fire in 1996 and was rebuilt in 1999. St. Peter's Church on Carroll Street, dedicated in 1844, was the island's first Roman Catholic house of worship. It remains one of Staten Island's most historically important churches, with more than half of the island's Catholic churches having been derived from St. Peter's parish.

=== Houses ===
The Fort Hill area comprises the remains of the streets and homes where the descendants of the Tompkins, Westervelt, and Low families lived. The area included the mansions of Daniel D. Tompkins, Anson Phelps-Stokes, and Daniel Low. Another prominent landowner was August Belmont, whose name is enshrined in Belmont Place. Many of the houses remaining today represent the homes and summer homes of the Low-Tompkins extended family and friends. The residential Fort Hill area includes many examples of Victorian, Tudor, Shingle style, and Art Deco architecture, in addition to one house modeled after a Spanish castle. On the waterfront, there are two Greek Revival houses on St. George's waterfront, at 404 and 272 Richmond Terrace. These are the last remnants of a "Temple Row" that existed on the waterfront in the mid-19th century.

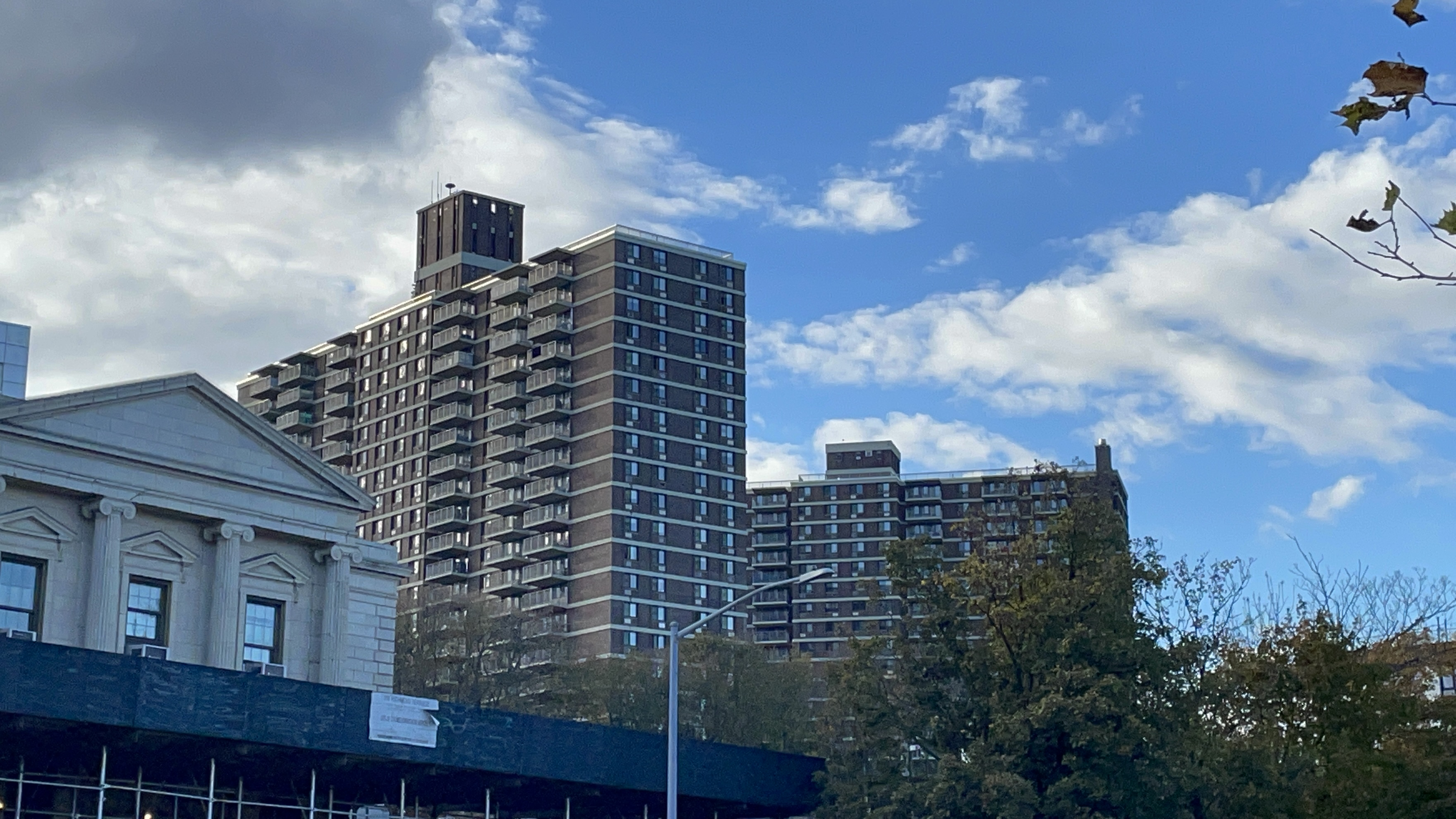
The Castleton Park Apartments

There are also several apartment buildings in St. George. The Ambassador Apartments, built in 1932 in the Art Deco style, is located at 30 Daniel Low Terrace. The 20-story Castleton Park Apartments, at 165-185 St. Marks Place, are estimated to be the tallest buildings on Staten Island.

The August and Augusta Schoverling House, Vanderzee-Harper House and four of the "Horton's Row" houses at 411–417 Westervelt Avenue are designated as official city landmarks. A part of the neighborhood is located in the St. George/New Brighton Historic District, designated in 1994. The historic district consists of 78 houses as well as St. Peter's Church. The houses are in a mix of Victorian styles, such as Queen Anne, Shingle style, Colonial Revival, and Tudor.

Houses in St. George
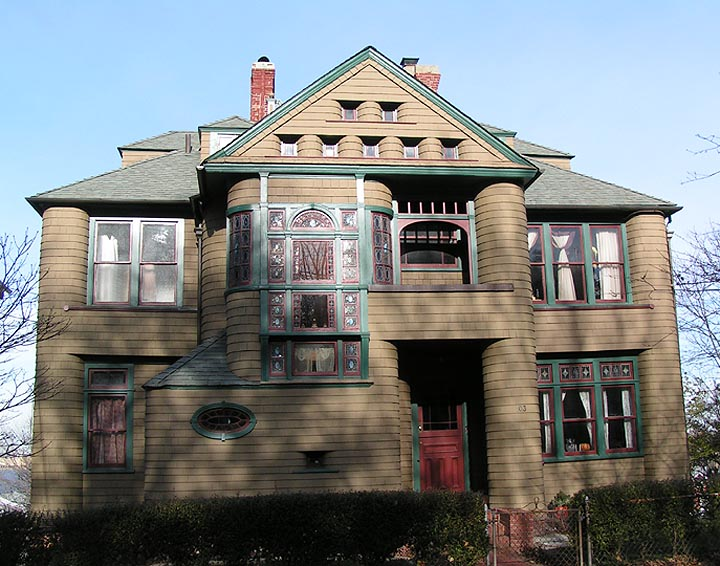
Victorian home in the St. George Historic District

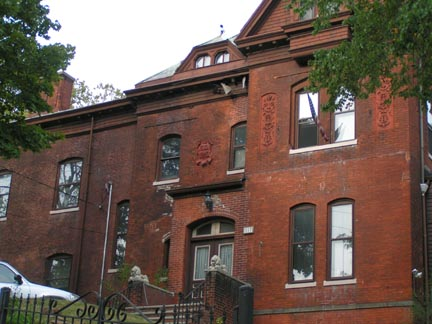
Mansion on Daniel Low Terrace

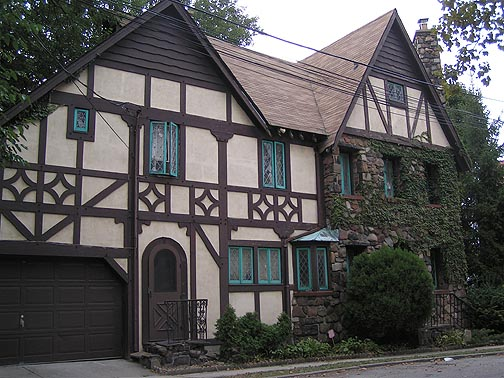
Tudor-style home on Fort Hill where a British fort once stood

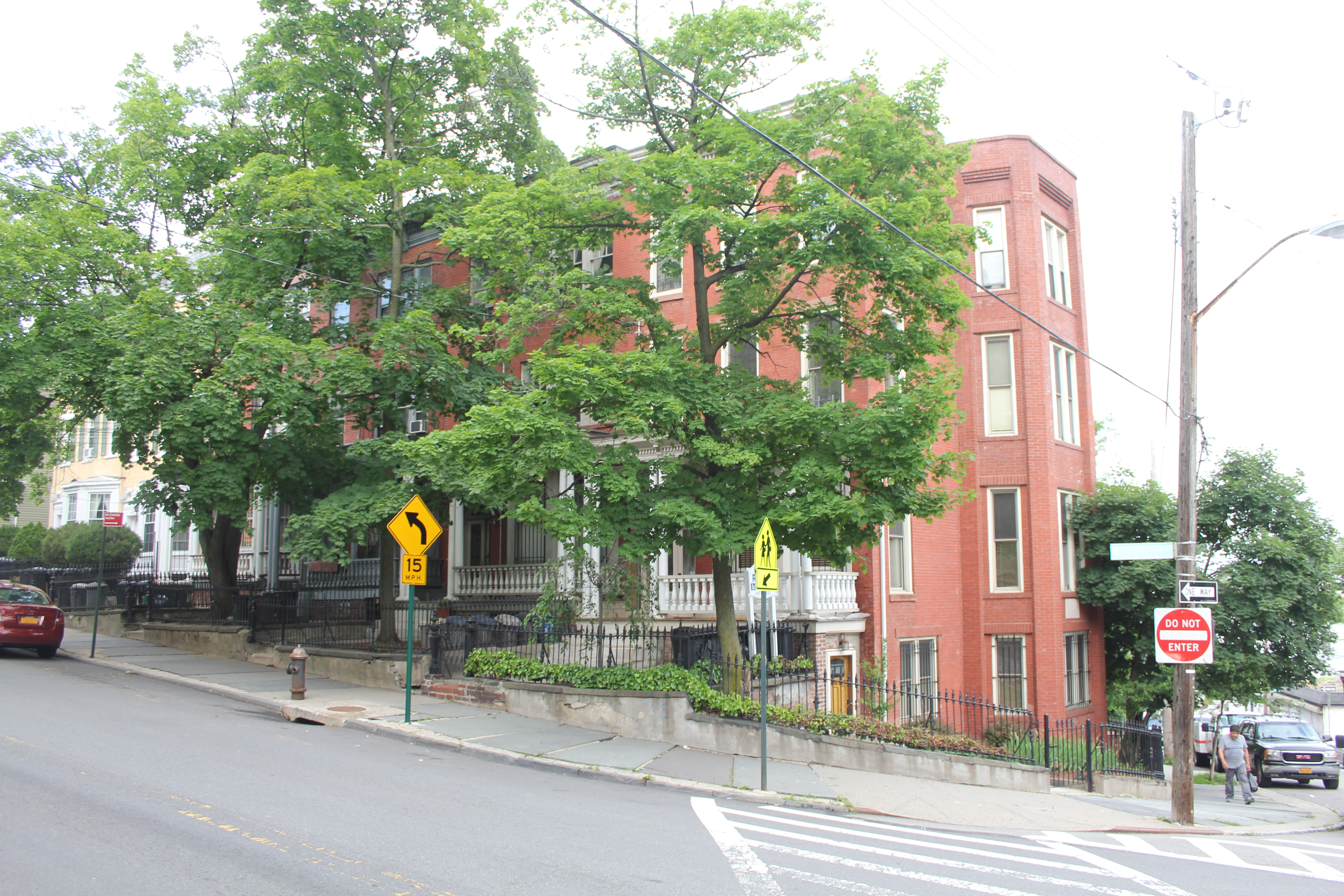
Horton's Row house

== Attractions ==
The Hyatt Street side of a municipal parking lot faces the St. George Theatre. This part of the lot is noted for the greenmarket held on it during spring, summer and fall. The lot encompasses a paved-over graveyard of the former quarantine hospital, whose remains were reburied nearby.

=== Entertainment and shopping ===
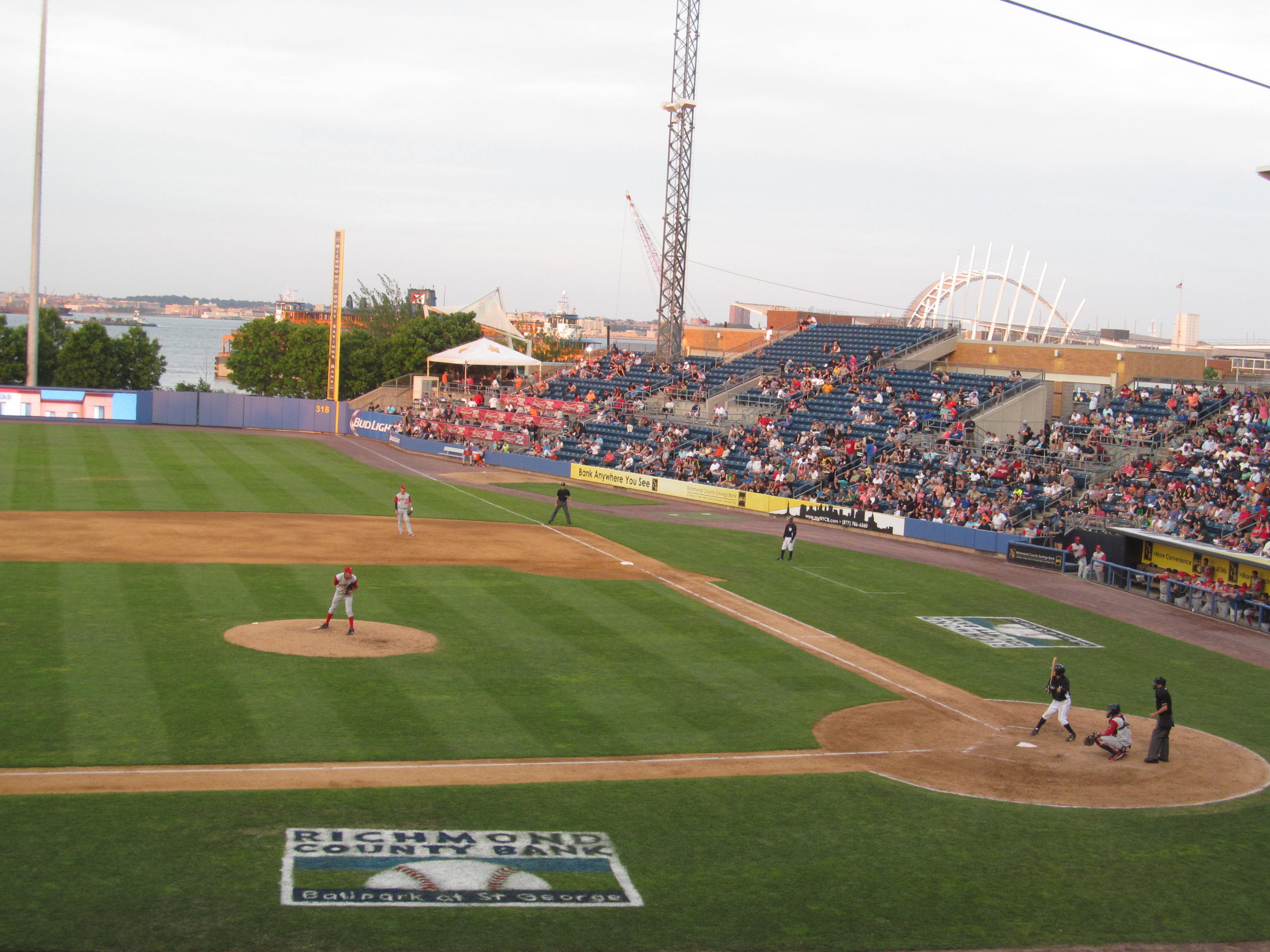
Richmond County Bank Ballpark

The 2,800-seat St. George Theatre is located on Hyatt Street at the intersection with Central Avenue. The theater hosts a variety of activities, including educational programs, architectural tours, television and film shoots, concerts, comedy, and Broadway touring companies. The theater was built for Staten Island theater operator Solomon Brill and opened in 1929. Eugene De Rosa was the St. George Theatre's main architect, and was assisted by Staten Island resident James Whitford, while the ornate Spanish and Italian Baroque interior of the St. George Theatre was designed by Nestor Castro. The theatre was renovated in 2004. The upper stories are used as office floors.

The SIUH Community Park (formerly named Richmond County Bank Ballpark) located on the waterfront was home of the Staten Island Yankees, a minor league farm club of the New York Yankees from 2001 to 2020. It is now home to the Staten Island FerryHawks of the independent Atlantic League. The 7,171-seat stadium opened in 2001.

Empire Outlets, an outlet mall in St. George, opened in May 2019. The mall is located next to the site of the New York Wheel, a 625-foot (190.5 m) tall giant Ferris wheel that was canceled in 2018. The two projects initially went through the approval process simultaneously and shared consultants on issues such as traffic and the waterfront, but were separate projects with separate funding.

=== Museums and memorials ===
The Staten Island Museum building, built in St. George in 1927 with an addition in 1999, is located at Wall Street and Stuyvesant Place two blocks northwest of the St. George Terminal. The museum explores the arts, natural science, and local history of the island.

In 1998, planning started for the National Lighthouse Museum, dedicated to the history of the United States Lighthouse Service. After several delays due to a lack of funds, the museum opened in 2015, within Building 12 of the USLHS/US Coast Guard depot.

The St. George waterfront is the location of Postcards, a September 11 memorial that opened in 2004. The memorial includes two white marble wing sculptures, each standing 30 feet (9.1 m) high, which represent large postcards to loved ones.

== Police and crime ==
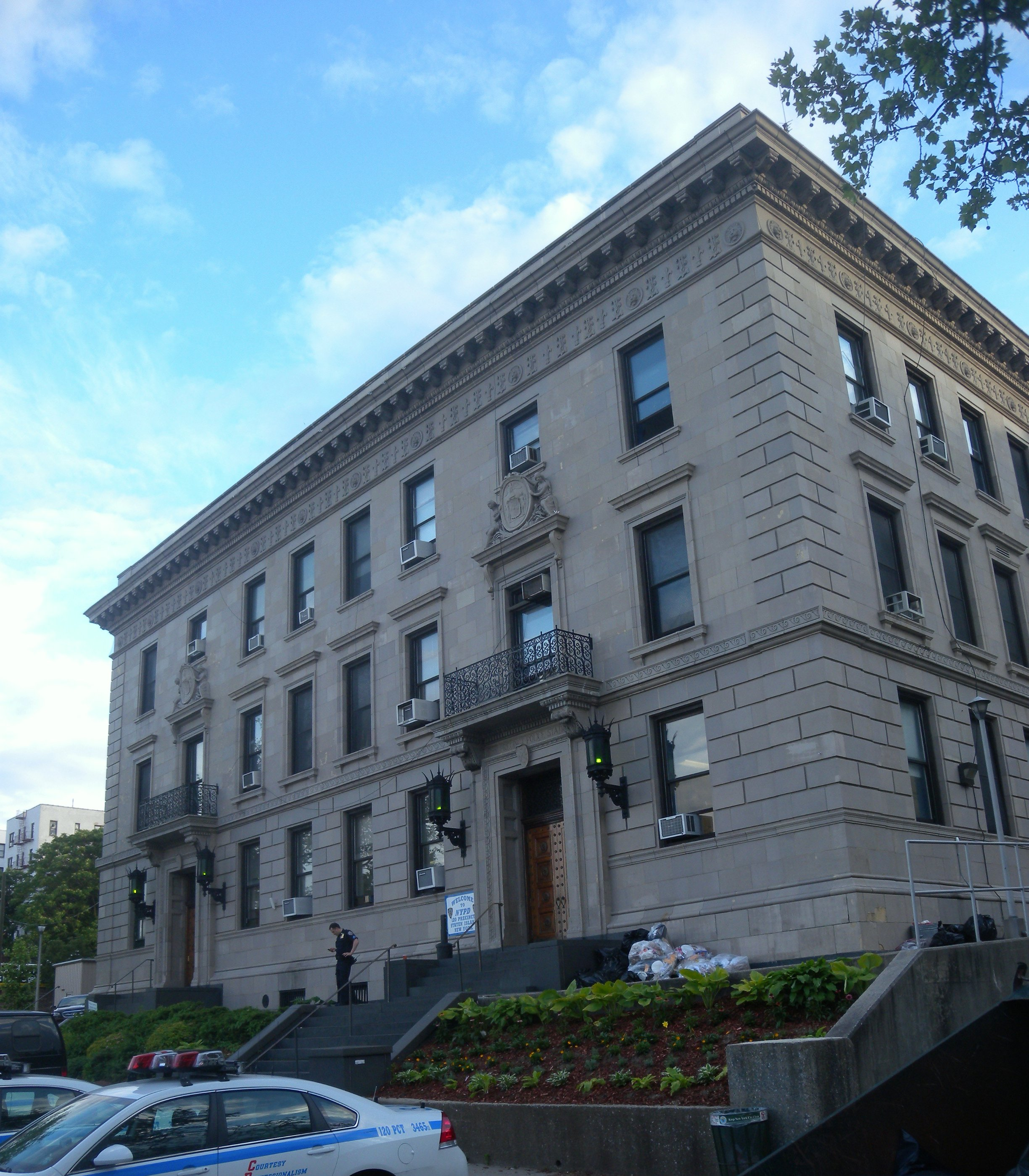
NYPD 120th Precinct station house

St. George and the North Shore are patrolled by the 120th Precinct of the NYPD, located at 78 Richmond Terrace. The 120th Precinct ranked 12th safest out of 69 patrol areas for per-capita crime in 2010. As of 2018, with a non-fatal assault rate of 94 per 100,000 people, St. George and the North Shore's rate of violent crimes per capita is more than that of the city as a whole. The incarceration rate of 719 per 100,000 people is higher than that of the city as a whole.

The 120th Precinct has a lower crime rate than in the 1990s, with crimes across all categories having decreased by 83.3% between 1990 and 2022. The precinct reported seven murders, 14 rapes, 118 robberies, 384 felony assaults, 124 burglaries, 338 grand larcenies, and 136 grand larcenies auto in 2022.

The 120th Precinct building was erected in 1920–1923 in the Italian Renaissance style. In 2000, it was designated as a New York City landmark.

== Fire safety ==
St. George is served by the New York City Fire Department (FDNY)'s Engine Co. 155/Ladder Co. 78, located at 14 Brighton Avenue.

== Health ==
As of 2018, preterm births and births to teenage mothers are more common in St. George and the North Shore than in other places citywide. In St. George and the North Shore, there were 96 preterm births per 1,000 live births (compared to 87 per 1,000 citywide), and 22.6 births to teenage mothers per 1,000 live births (compared to 19.3 per 1,000 citywide). St. George and the North Shore have a relatively average population of residents who are uninsured. In 2018, this population of uninsured residents was estimated to be 12%, the same as the citywide rate of 12%.

The concentration of fine particulate matter, the deadliest type of air pollutant, in St. George and the North Shore is 0.0071 milligrams per cubic metre (7.1×10^{−9} oz/ft^{3}), less than the city average. Sixteen percent of St. George and the North Shore residents are smokers, which is higher than the city average of 14% of residents being smokers. In St. George and the North Shore, 24% of residents are obese, 9% are diabetic, and 26% have high blood pressure—compared to the citywide averages of 24%, 11%, and 28% respectively. In addition, 21% of children are obese, compared to the citywide average of 20%.

Eighty-seven percent of residents eat some fruits and vegetables every day, which is the same as the city's average of 87%. In 2018, 77% of residents described their health as "good", "very good", or "excellent", equal to the city's average of 78%. For every supermarket in St. George and the North Shore, there are 28 bodegas.

The nearest major hospital is Richmond University Medical Center in West New Brighton.

== Post office and ZIP Code ==
St. George is located within the ZIP Code 10301. The United States Postal Service operates the Saint George Station at 45 Bay Street.

== Education ==
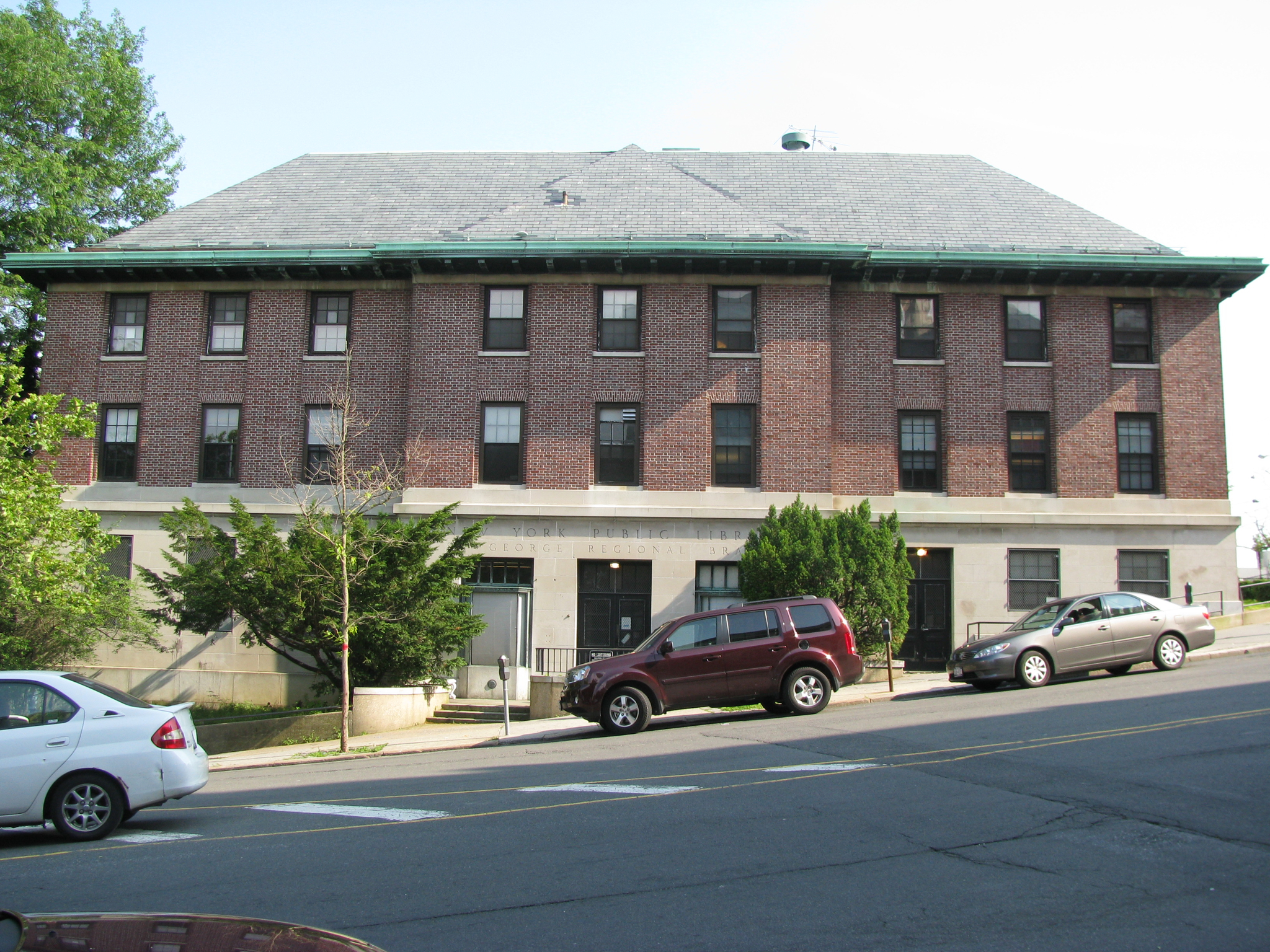
New York Public Library, St. George Library Ctr

St. George and the North Shore generally have a lower rate of college-educated residents than the rest of the city as of 2018. While 37% of residents age 25 and older have a college education or higher, 15% have less than a high school education and 48% are high school graduates or have some college education. By contrast, 39% of Staten Island residents and 43% of city residents have a college education or higher. The percentage of St. George and the North Shore students excelling in math rose from 49% in 2000 to 65% in 2011, though reading achievement declined from 55% to 51% during the same time period.

St. George and the North Shore's rate of elementary school student absenteeism is slightly higher than the rest of New York City. In St. George and the North Shore, 25% of elementary school students missed twenty or more days per school year, more than the citywide average of 20%. Additionally, 73% of high school students in St. George and the North Shore graduate on time, about the same as the citywide average of 75%.

=== Schools ===
The New York City Department of Education operates five public schools in St. George:

- PS 16 John J Driscoll (grades PK-5)
- PS 31 William T Davis (grades PK-5)
- PS 74 Future Leaders Elementary School (grades K-5)
- Curtis High School (grades 9–12); the first high school on Staten Island, it is a city landmark
- Ralph R McKee Career and Technical Education High School (grades 9–12)

=== Library ===
The New York Public Library (NYPL)'s St. George Library Center is located at 5 Central Avenue, across from Staten Island's Borough Hall and County Courthouse. The St. George Library Center, Staten Island's main library, was built in 1906–1907; it was designed by Carrère and Hastings in the Georgian Revival style. The branch contains three stories, including a basement. The first floor contains the main reading room, while the second floor contains a children's collection, and the lower level contains a collection for young adults.

== Transportation ==
Transportation at St. George Terminal

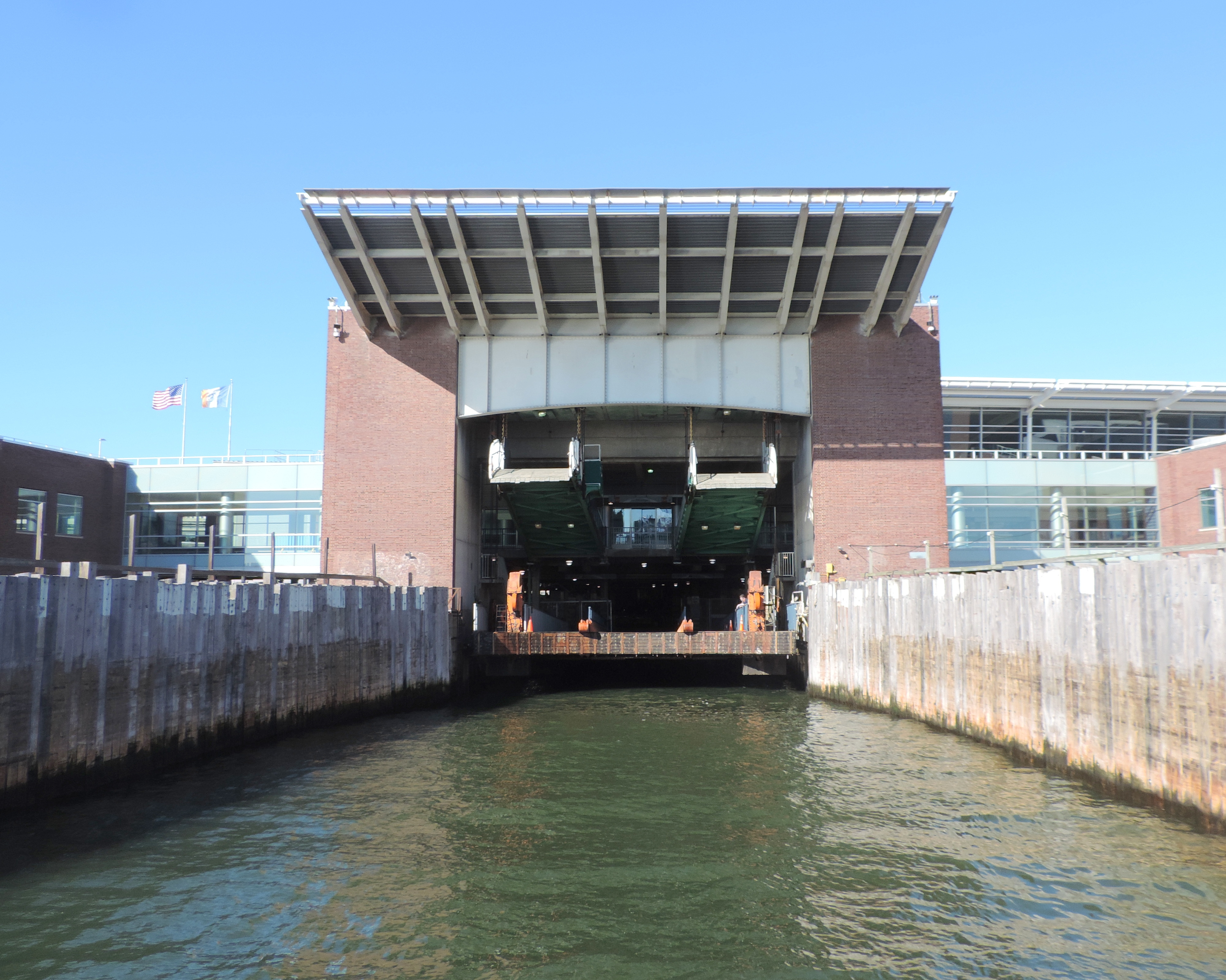
Ferry

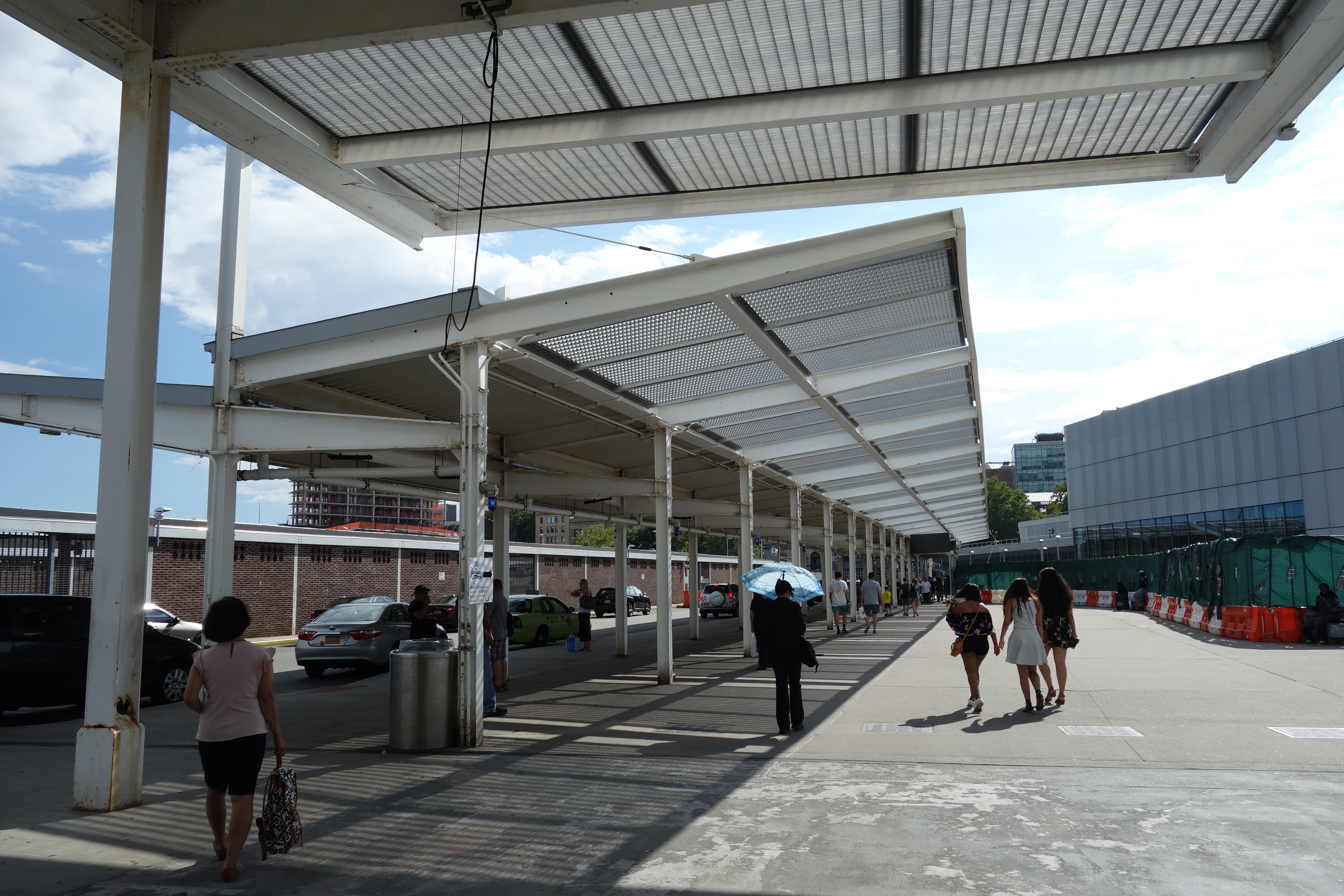
Bus

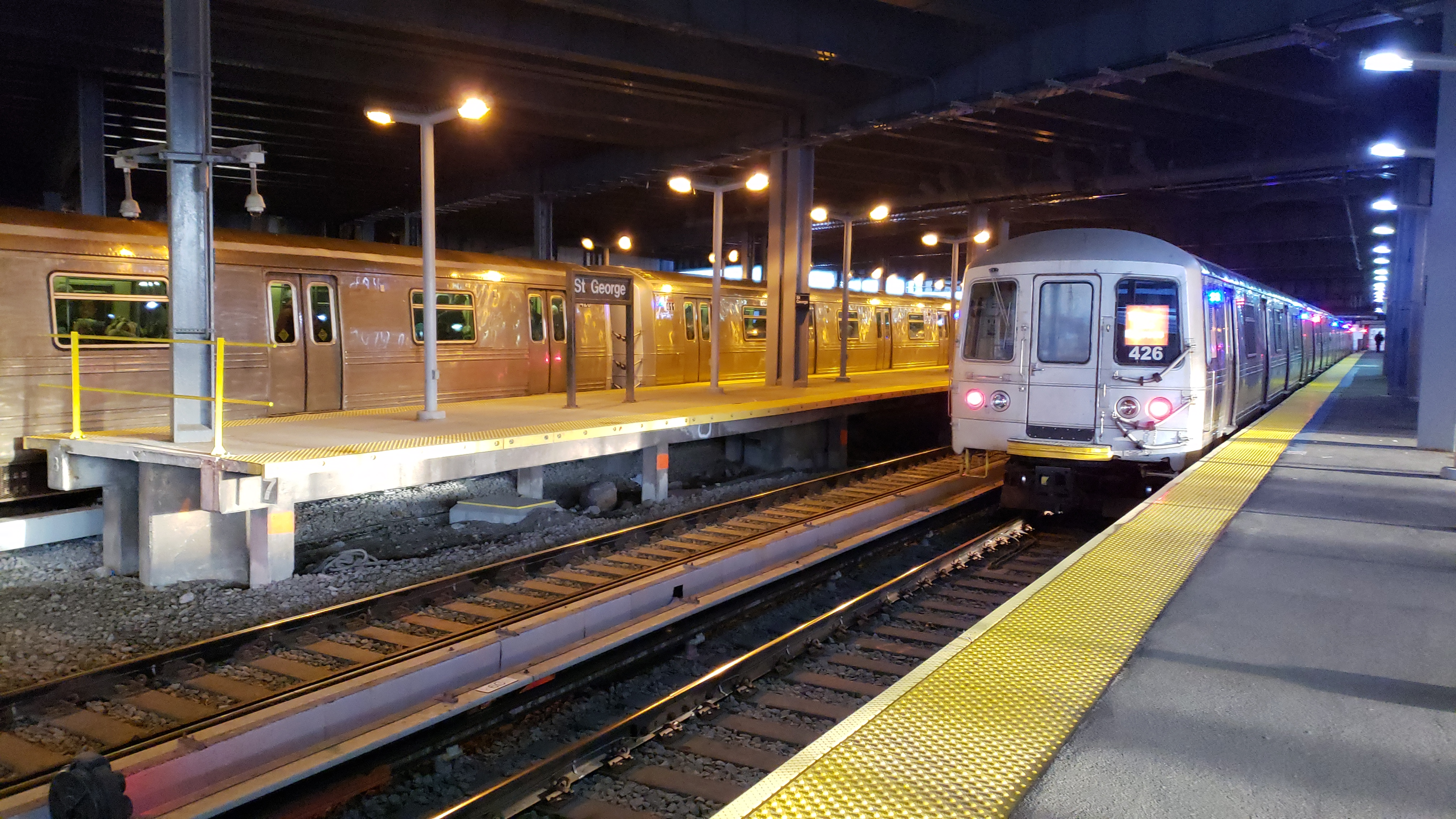
Railroad

St. George Terminal is a ferry, railway, bus, and park and ride complex at Richmond Terrace and Bay Street. Opened in 1886, it was renovated multiple times, most recently in 2005. The renovated terminal has panoramic views of the harbor and incoming ferries.

St. George Terminal is served by nearly all Staten Island bus routes, except for the S53, S54, S55, S56, S57, S59, S79 SBS and S89, as well as the Staten Island Railway and the Staten Island Ferry. Additionally, St. George is also served by the NYC Ferry's St. George route.

== Telephone exchange ==
In 1924, the "Saint George" telephone exchange was established in the new North Staten Island building of New York Telephone, one of the island's five such exchanges. It became "SAint George 7" when New York City's service underwent a major upgrade six years later. This three-digit prefix, now identified by numbers as "727", is the last of the five pre-upgrade exchanges still in service. Due to the abbreviation of "Saint" in the name of "Saint George", some historic telephone books such as those of the NYPD mistakenly gave the exchange as "ST. George 7", which directed the caller to an exchange in Manhattan.

== Notable people ==
- Paul Newman and his wife Joanne Woodward, both actors, lived in the Ambassador, an Art Deco apartment building on Daniel Low Terrace between Crescent Avenue and Fort Hill Circle, in their early days in film.
- Max Rose, Democratic congressman for New York's 11th congressional district from 2018 to 2020, lives in St. George as of 2018.
- Actor Brendan Sexton III was born in St. George.
- Actor Martin Sheen lived in the Ambassador building, and his son Emilio Estevez was born there.
