= New York Wheel =

Proposed Ferris wheel in Staten Island, New York

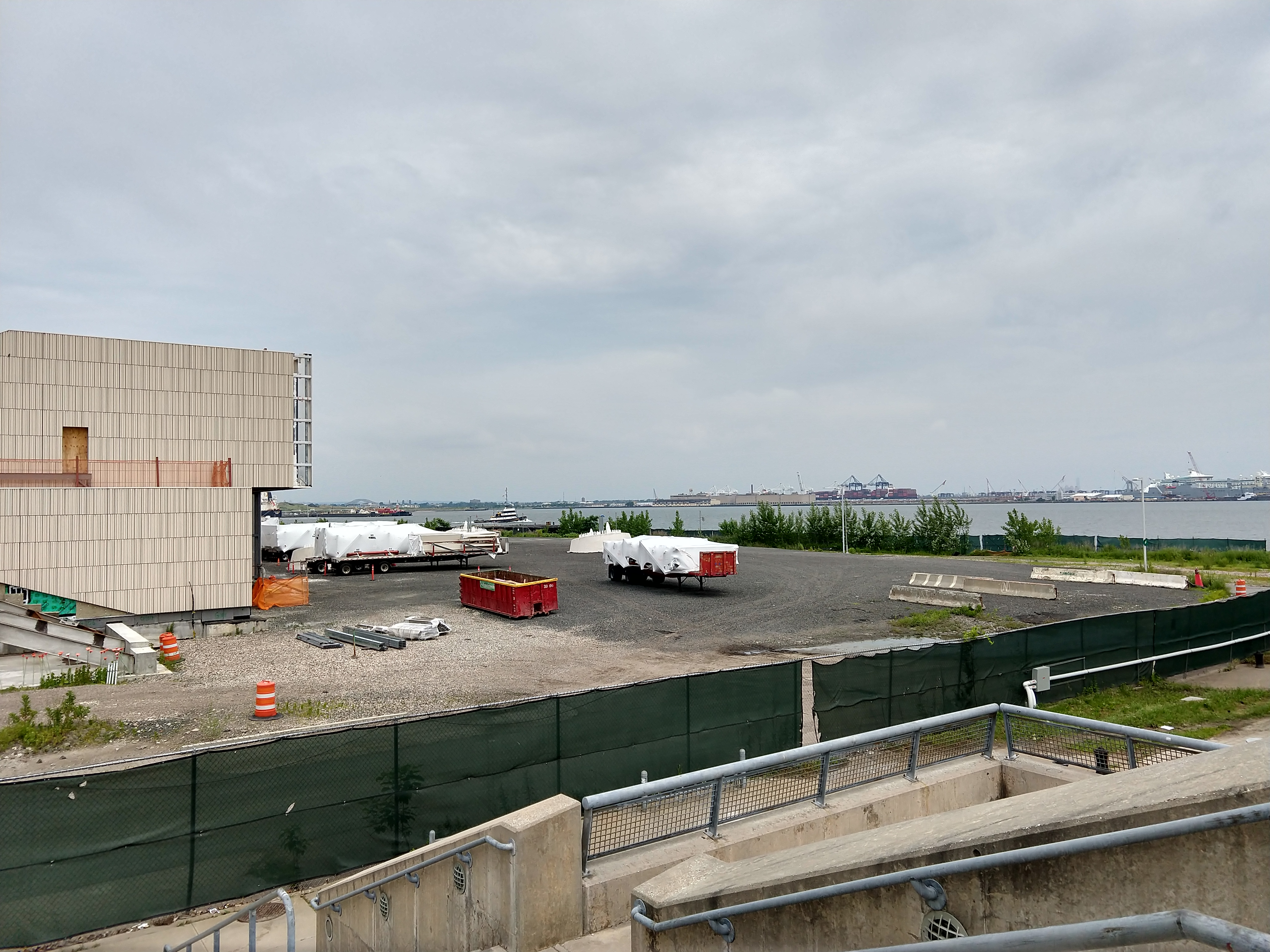
- Site of the New York Wheel, seen in June 2018

General information
- Status: Never built
- Type: Ferris wheel
- Location: Staten Island, New York City
- Coordinates: 40°38′49.2″N 74°4′41.9″W
- Cost: 2012 estimate: $230 million 2013 estimate: $330 million 2014 estimate: $400 million 2016 estimate: $590 million 2018 estimate: $900 million

Height
- Height: 630 ft (192.0 m)

Design and construction
- Architect: Mammoet-Starneth LLC
- Developer: New York Wheel LLC
- Main contractor: Mammoet-Starneth LLC

Other information
- Seating capacity: 1,440

The New York Wheel was a proposed 630-foot (190 m) Ferris wheel to be located in the St. George neighborhood of Staten Island, New York City, next to the Empire Outlets retail complex.

The project was announced in 2012 as part of an effort to make St. George a tourist attraction. It was canceled by investors in September 2018 after New York City mayor Bill de Blasio refused to endorse selling city bonds to finance what he called a risky speculative project that was supposed to be entirely privately funded.

Proposals to build a smaller New York Wheel were being discussed in May 2019, but these were officially cancelled in February 2023.

== Planning ==
=== Announcement ===
In October 2008, developer Meir Laufer rode the London Eye and met with its lead engineer. He established a business relationship with them to bring a wheel to New York. On September 27, 2012, then-New York City Mayor Michael Bloomberg and then-New York Wheel CEO Richard Marin announced a deal to build the wheel at the St. George Waterfront District.

=== Delays ===
Construction of the wheel was supposed to run from early 2014 to 2015. It was pushed back several times. In April 2013, it was reported to be July 4, 2016. On June 12, 2013, construction was approved by Staten Island Community Board 1, and on October 30 it was also approved by New York City Council, with construction to start in early 2014 and a grand opening planned for 2016, but as of October 2014, construction was planned to start in early 2015 with an opening date for early 2017. On December 11, 2014, state economic development officials excluded the proposal from a list of 824 projects selected for state funding under a regional economic development program, saying it would not provide the overall economic benefit needed to qualify, however a spokesman for the project said it would continue to move forward. By August 2016, the Ferris wheel was estimated to open in early 2018, and by March, the proposed completion date was late 2019.

In January 2016, The Real Deal, citing mounting lawsuits by infighting members, ran an article skeptical about the project: "Is the New York Wheel spinning out of control?" In July 2017, the design and construction teams were fired and construction was postponed indefinitely. The following month, New York Wheel LLC announced that it planned to engage American Bridge Company as the new contractor.

Instead, the developers filed for bankruptcy in Delaware in December 2017. As part of the bankruptcy agreement, developer New York Wheel LLC and contractor Mammoet-Starneth agreed to find funding by September 5, 2018, with the proviso that the project would be canceled if funding was not found before that date.

=== Cancellation ===
In May 2018, the developers of the New York Wheel were given a last chance to obtain funding for the project. Per a ruling in Delaware bankruptcy court, the developers had 120 days, or until September 5, to find funding. However, on September 7, 2018, it was announced that the New York Wheel would not receive $140 million in city funding. The delays caused concern among EB-5 visa investors, who would lose their visas if the project was not constructed. An amendment to the bankruptcy court's ruling gave the developers a final 120-day extension to look for funding. If the developers did not get funding by January 2019, the project would be canceled and no further funding extensions would be given. At the time, the developers were spending $400,000 a month to store the parts for the New York Wheel.

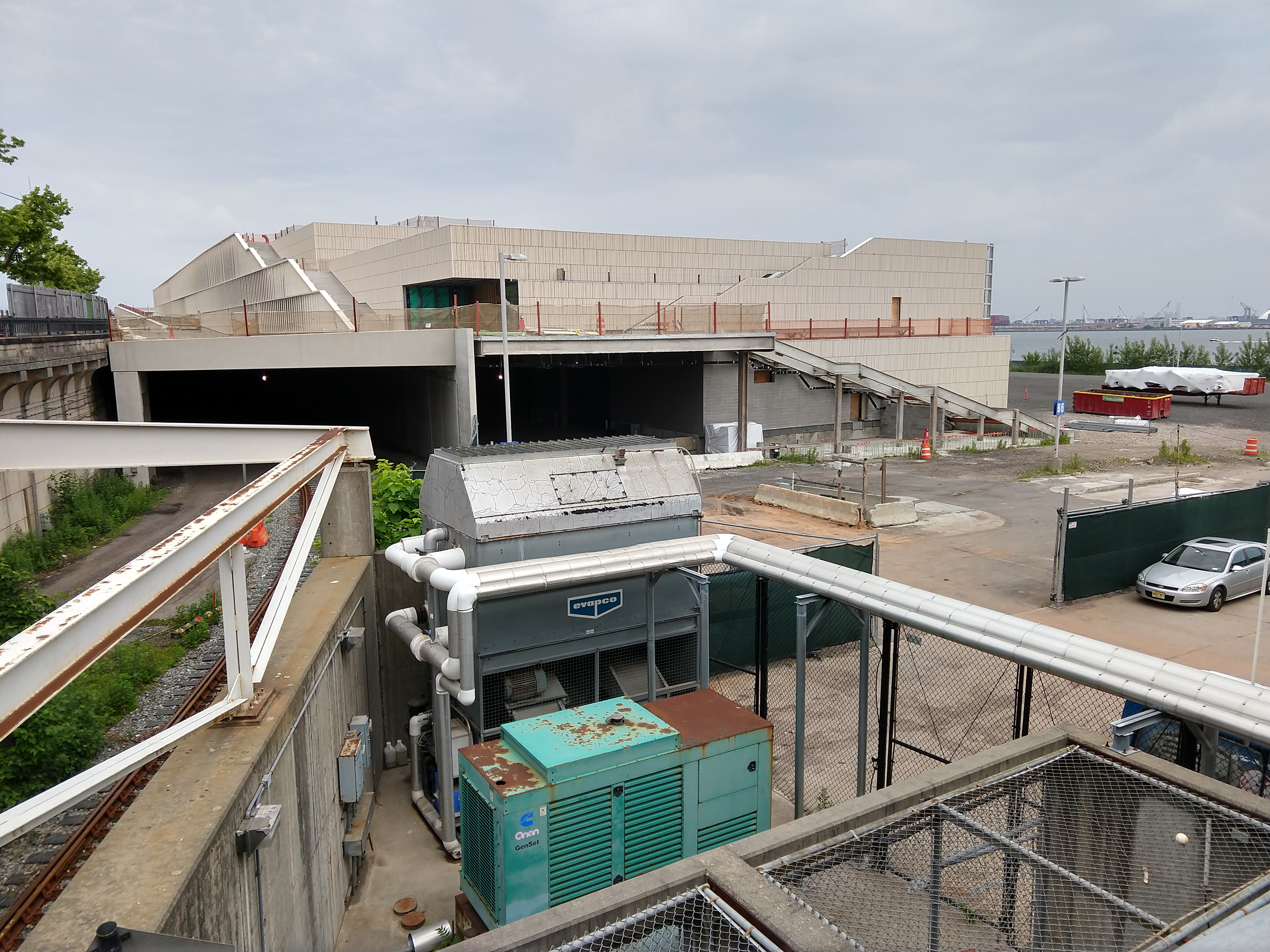
New York Wheel parking garage as of June 2018

On September 21, 2018, mayor Bill de Blasio said that the now-$900-million project would not receive a bailout from the city because it was too risky to support the project with bonds. As such, the city would not support tax free status for a $380 million bond sale to complete the project. Investors refused to proceed with construction without city support, and stated that it would allow the parts for the Ferris wheel to be auctioned off if the city did not provide funding. Subsequently, investors decided to cancel the project. At this point, investors had spent $450 million on the project. The official announcement of the project's cancellation was made the following month.

However, the developers never terminated their lease with the city, which was still ongoing through November 2021. According to the lease agreement, the developers were to pay the city annually $1 million in rent, plus interest. though these would be deferred. By December 2018, the deferred payment amounted to $2.3 million. In May 2019, it was announced that the developers were seeking new investors for a smaller wheel on the site, and that the NYCEDC was in talks with potential investors. In August, the Staten Island Advance reported that Wheel investors and EB-5 visa investors were "actively pursuing a smaller project more like the London Eye."

In February, the NYCEDC sent CanAm Enterprises, which is a sponsor of EB-5 regional center projects, a notice of lease termination on February 2 effectively ending any further development of the NY Wheel. The NYCEDC would instead issue a request for proposals (RFP) for a different project to be built on the site. Work on this new project began in May 2026.

== Design and construction ==
The designated designer and manufacturer was Mammoet-Starneth LLC, which had team members who worked on the London Eye. The New York Wheel was to have 36 passenger capsules (which were to be built by the Dutch company VDL Groep), each carrying up to 40 passengers, and a total maximum capacity of 1,440 people per ride. Bloomberg's office has expected up to 30,000 passengers per day and about 4.5 million per year.

The wheel was expected to create 400 construction jobs and 700 full-time jobs. Four large pedestals for the wheel arrived on site in November 2016. Legs for the wheel arrived in spring 2018. Following the announcement of the Wheel's cancellation in late 2018, the completed portions of the wheel (namely its legs, drive towers, and capsules) were auctioned in January 2019.

== Parking garage ==
The New York Wheel public parking garage opened on August 12, 2016. Planned to accommodate commuters using the Staten Island Ferry, this waterfront garage originally accommodated 820 vehicles, expanding to 950 spaces upon completion of construction.
