= Postcards (memorial) =

Sculpture in Staten Island, New York

Coordinates: 40°38′48″N 74°4′35″W

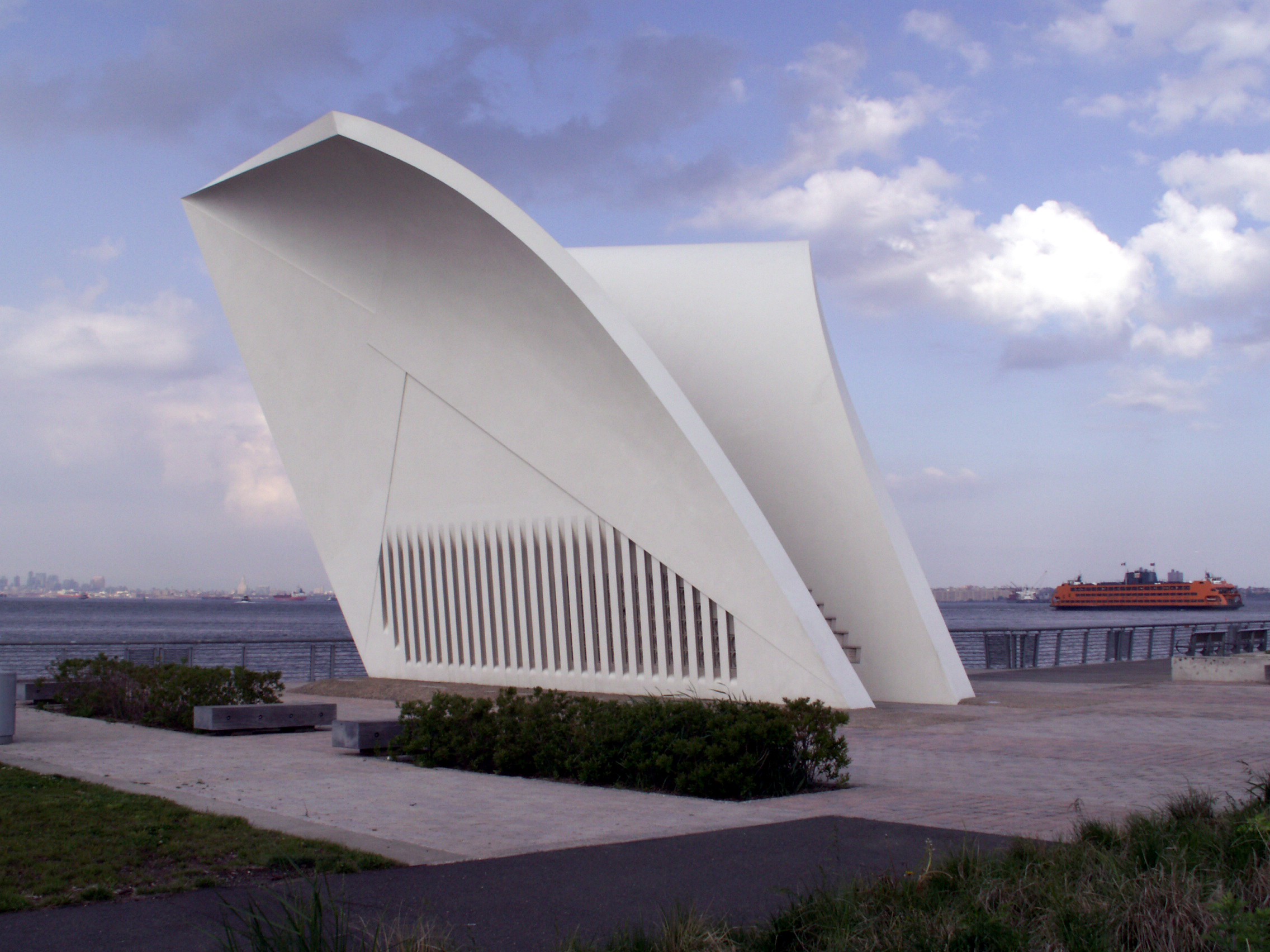
View of the Postcards memorial

Postcards is an outdoor sculpture in St. George, Staten Island, New York City, United States. Built in 2004, it is a permanent memorial honoring the 274 Staten Island residents killed in the September 11 attacks of 2001 and in the 1993 World Trade Center bombing. The dead include many who worked at the World Trade Center, police and firefighters who joined the rescue effort and were killed when the towers collapsed, and one passenger on United Airlines Flight 93, who died in the crash in Shanksville, Pennsylvania. One individual who was killed in the 1993 World Trade Center bombing is also represented.

== Design ==
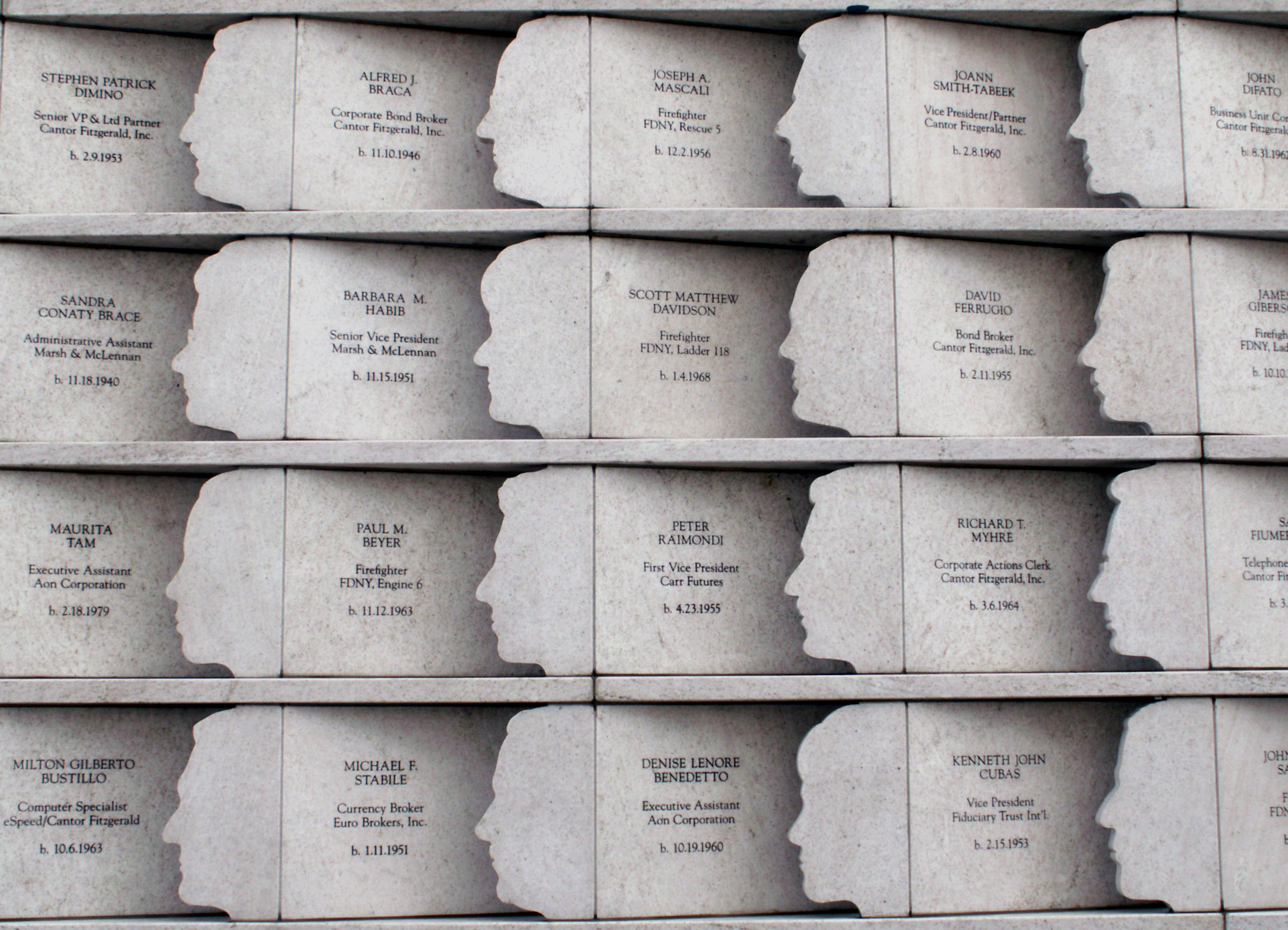
Plaques and silhouettes

Each Staten Island victim is honored with a 9-by-11-inch (23 cm × 28 cm) granite plaque bearing their name, birthdate, and place of work on September 11, 2001, as well as their profile in silhouette.

The centerline between the two walls (postcards) points directly at Ground Zero, thereby referencing the Twin Towers of the World Trade Center destroyed on 9/11. The individual silhouettes all look in the same direction, toward Ground Zero. The effect of standing between the walls can be quite powerful—some have experienced a kind of "oneness" with those who were lost represented in silhouettes as all look together toward the site of the missing towers.

The attack on the towers created such massive burning and destruction that few identifiable remains were recovered for burial. According to James Molinaro, Borough President of Staten Island, "Maybe 60 percent of those of the people whose profile is here, their next of kin, their loved ones, didn't receive any remains. This is their cemetery."

== History ==
The memorial was designed by New York-based architect Masayuki Sono, who won the design competition held in early 2003. It was commissioned for this site, along the North Shore Waterfront near St. George Terminal, and overlooking the New York Harbor, Lower Manhattan, and the Statue of Liberty. Construction began on September 11, 2003 at New England Boatworks. The opening and dedication took place on September 11, 2004.

In 2018, upon the request of borough president James Oddo, the office of mayor Bill de Blasio allocated $250,000 from the New York City Economic Development Corporation to renovate the memorial. Cleanup began in July 2019.
