= Brighton Heights Reformed Church =

- U.S. National Register of Historic Places
- New York City Landmark
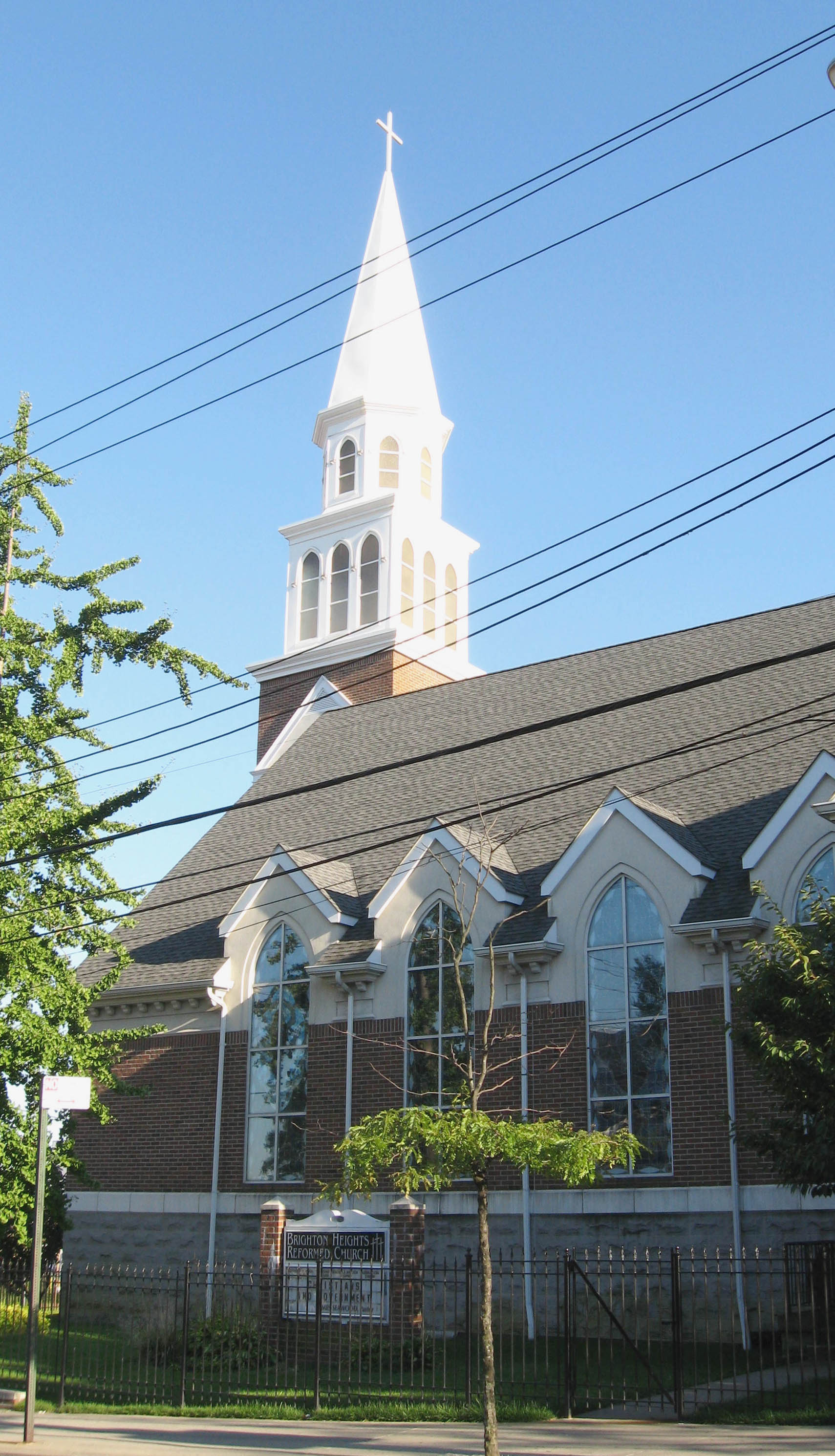
- Newer structure, which replaced the original burned church

- Location within New York City Location within New York Location within the United States
- Location: 320 St. Marks Place, Staten Island, New York
- Coordinates: 40°38′29″N 74°4′43″W
- Built: 1866
- Architect: John Correja
- Architectural style: Gothic Revival
- NRHP reference No.: 82003399

Significant dates
- Added to NRHP: June 3, 1982
- Designated NYCL: October 12, 1967

Brighton Heights Reformed Church is a Dutch Reformed church at 320 St. Marks Place in St. George, Staten Island, New York City. It is the second of two church buildings that have stood on the site.

The AIA Guide to New York City (1978) states that the original church was built in 1866, although the construction for the previous location began in 1818, and became independent in 1823, with one of its founding members being Vice President Daniel D. Tompkins.

The original building was added to the National Register of Historic Places in 1982. The current structure is not the one added to the NRHP. The original structure was destroyed in an accidental fire in the 1990s.

== See also ==
- List of New York City Designated Landmarks in Staten Island
- National Register of Historic Places listings in Richmond County, New York
