= Empire Outlets =

Shopping mall in New York City

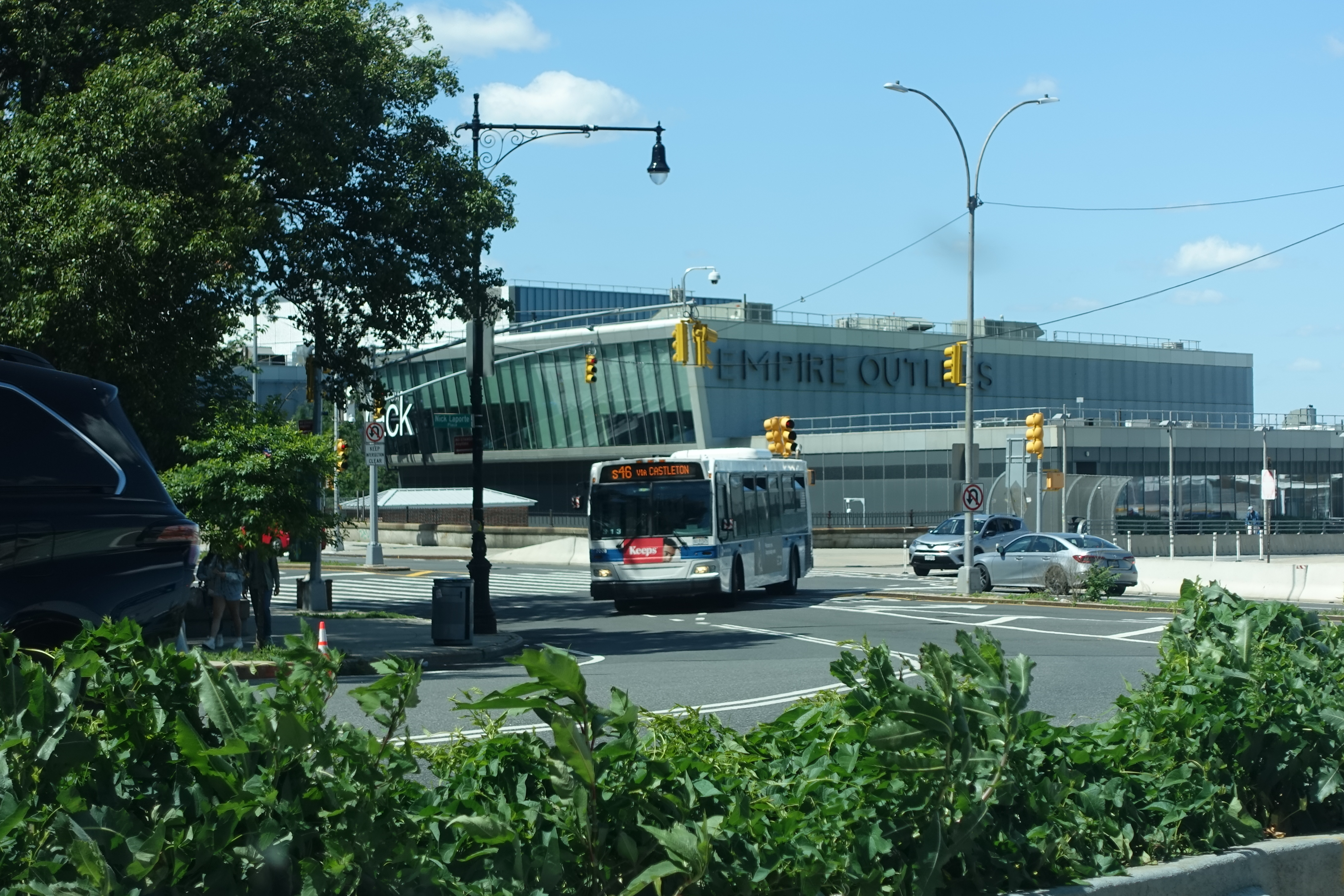
- Empire Outlets in June 2022
- Location: St. George, Staten Island, New York City, U.S.
- Coordinates: 40°38′40.7″N 74°4′29.1″W
- Address: 55 Richmond Terrace, Staten Island, NY 10301
- Opened: May 15, 2019
- Developer: Empire Outlets Builders, LLC
- Owner: Goldman Sachs
- Architect: SHoP Architects
- Num. of stores: 100
- Floor area: 350,000 ft^{2} (33,000 m^{2})
- Parking: 1,250
- Public transit: Staten Island Ferry, Staten Island Railway, and MTA bus routes at St. George Terminal
- Website: https://empireoutlets.nyc

Empire Outlets New York City is a 350,000-square-foot (33,000 m^{2}) retail complex in the St. George neighborhood of Staten Island in New York City. Construction on Empire Outlets started in 2015, and the complex opened on May 15, 2019. Tentative plans called for 100 stores, but there is only space for about 70 stores, less than half of which are currently occupied. It is the first outlet mall in New York City. The mall is located next to the St. George Terminal, a major ferry, train, and bus hub.

== Facilities ==
The 350,000 ft^{2} (33,000 m^{2}) mall, the city's first outlet mall, was to feature 100 designer outlet stores and a 120,000 ft^{2} (11,000 m^{2}) hotel with 200 rooms as it originally was approved. There are also 3.5 acres (1.4 ha) of outdoor space with a staircase leading to a green roof. The mall includes a 1,200-space underground parking lot, as well as 22 escalators and 21 elevators. As of July 2018, tenants leasing significant amounts of space included H&M, Nordstrom Rack, Levi's, Nike Factory, and Gap Inc.'s subsidiaries Banana Republic and Old Navy.

Empire Outlets is located between St. George Terminal and SIUH Community Park. The mall is located next to the site of the unbuilt New York Wheel, a 625-foot (190.5 m) tall giant Ferris wheel that was canceled in 2018. The two projects initially went through the approval process simultaneously and shared consultants on issues such as traffic and the waterfront, but were separate projects with separate funding.

== History ==
=== Development ===
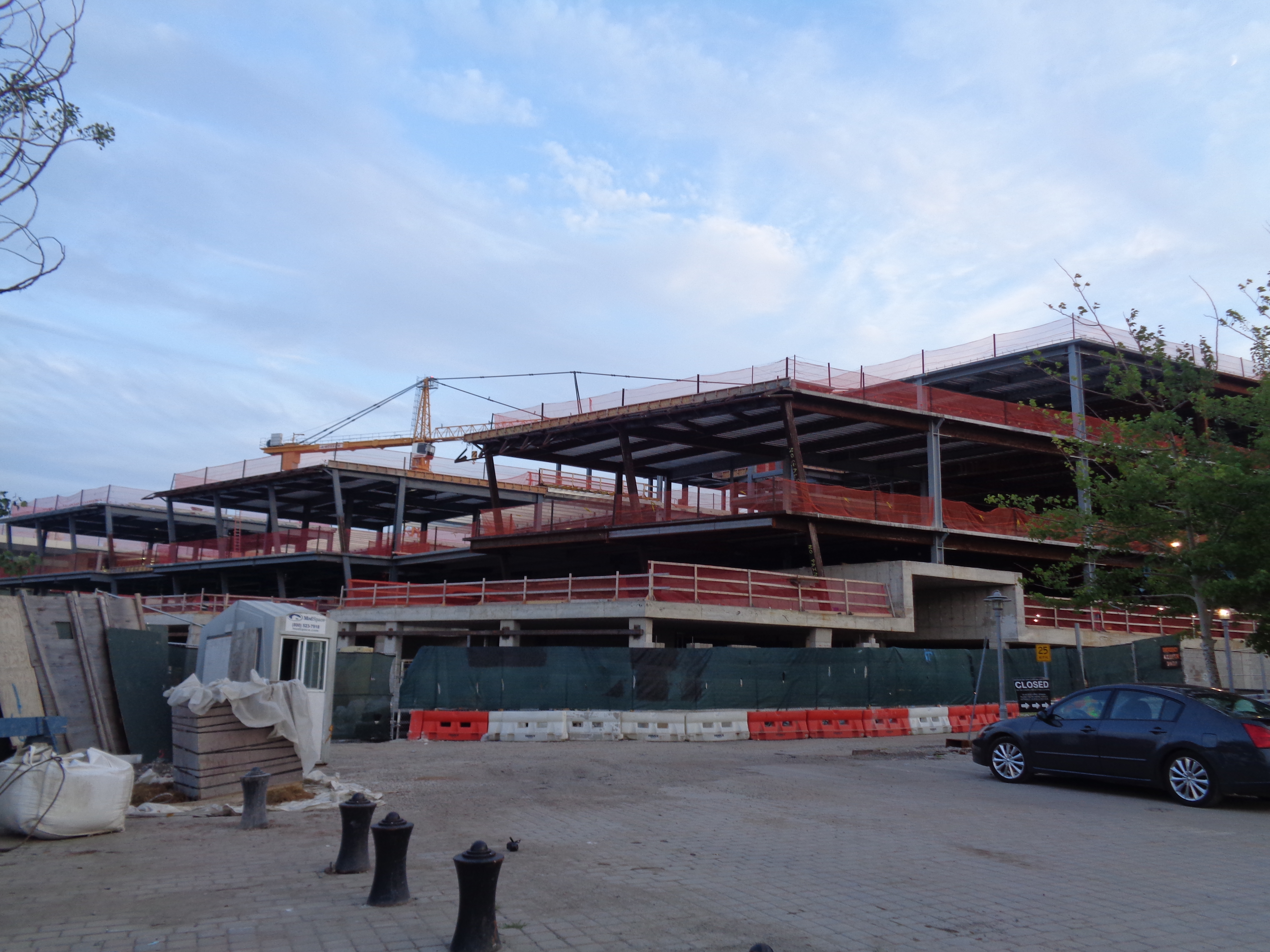
Empire Outlets under construction in August 2017

Construction on Empire Outlets started in 2015. BFC Partners, based in Brooklyn, constructed Empire Outlets under the auspices of the developer, an Economic Development Corp named Empire Outlets Builders, LLC. SHoP Architects provided architectural design services; DeSimone Consulting Engineers was the structural engineering firm; and Casandra Properties and EB were the leasing agents.

The original opening date for Empire Outlets was scheduled for fall 2017. However, in early 2017, the opening was delayed to March 2018 in order to coincide with the New York Wheel's opening. Later that year, the mall's opening was delayed again to late 2018. By July 2018, the mall was mostly complete, and was projected to open that November. However, in September 2018, the mall's opening date was postponed again, this time to spring 2019. The mall's opening date was later set at May 15, 2019.

=== Operation ===
Even though the grand opening was held on May 15, most retailers opened on a staggered schedule through mid-2019. By November 2019, there were thirty stores operating at Empire Outlets, and hundreds of thousands of visitors had traveled to the mall, with international tourists making up almost two-thirds of all spending at Empire Outlets. This, in turn, increased international spending on Staten Island by almost 50%. A 600-seat beer garden and a food market were expected to further increase visitation to Empire Outlets once they opened in early 2020, which they never did. By late 2020, Empire Outlets was struggling to make payments on loans.

In February 2022, Empire Outlets went into foreclosure; it owed $38 million to Sterling National Bank and $174 million to Goldman Sachs' Urban Investment Group. Foreclosure proceedings continued through mid-2023, when Empire Outlets was still 60 percent vacant. In August 2023, a foreclosure auction for the complex was scheduled for that September. At the auction, which took place on September 21, 2023, Goldman Sachs acquired Empire Outlets for $10 million.

In late 2024, it was announced that Nordstrom Rack would be closing that December. To cater to local residents' needs, and because the Empire Outlets had been unsuccessful in attracting tourists, the New York City Economic Development Corporation (NYCEDC) began soliciting local residents' feedback for the Empire Outlets site in 2025. That November, the NYCEDC and City Councilmember Kamillah Hanks announced plans for as many as 2,500 residents in the area, which would require rezoning Empire Outlets.

== Ferry dock ==
In January 2019, NYC Ferry announced that it would start operating its St. George route in 2020. The route opened in 2021 and runs from the St. George Terminal to Battery Park City Ferry Terminal and West Midtown Ferry Terminal in Manhattan. However, due to concerns that the massive Staten Island Ferry boats and the small NYC Ferry craft might not be able to share a dock, the New York City Economic Development Corporation announced in January 2020 that a NYC Ferry dock would instead be built close to the existing terminal, at Empire Outlets closer to SIUH Community Park. The St. George ferry stop began operating in August 2021.
