= Richmond County Courthouse (Staten Island) =

- U.S. National Register of Historic Places
- New York City Landmark
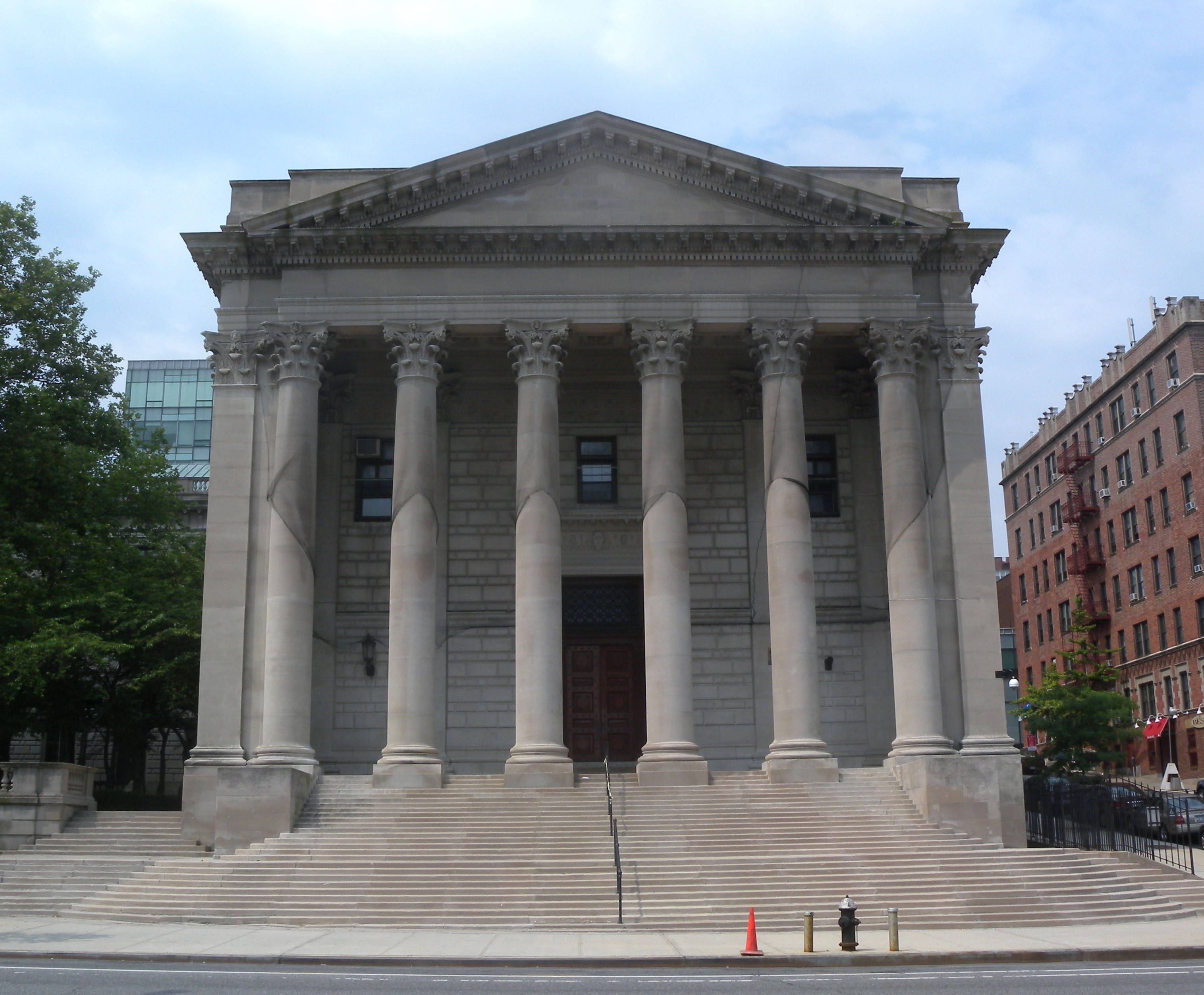
- Northeast or harbor-side facade

- Location within New York City
- Interactive map showing the Richmond County Courthouse
- Location: 18 Richmond Terrace, Staten Island, New York
- Coordinates: 40°38′33″N 74°4′35″W
- Area: 5 acres (2.0 ha) (incl. neighboring Borough Hall)
- Built: 1919
- Architect: Carrere & Hastings
- Architectural style: Late 19th and 20th Century Revivals
- NRHP reference No.: 83004150
- NYCL No.: 1206

Significant dates
- Added to NRHP: October 6, 1983 (as Staten Island Borough Hall and Richmond County Courthouse)
- Designated NYCL: March 23, 1982

The Richmond County Courthouse is a 1919 municipal courthouse in the civic center of St. George on Staten Island in New York City. It serves Richmond County, which is coextensive with the borough of Staten Island. The neoclassical style courthouse is on Richmond Terrace next to Staten Island's Borough Hall and across the street from the St. George Terminal of the Staten Island Ferry.

Richmond County Surrogate's Court is located in the building. The building also houses the Matrimonial Parts of State Supreme Court for the state's 13th Judicial District. It housed some other civil parts and the Criminal Parts of that court, as well as the office of its administrative judge, until they moved to a new courthouse at 26 Central Avenue, nearby, which opened on September 28, 2015.

== History ==
Construction of the Richmond County Courthouse was begun on December 27, 1913, but was delayed by the advent of World War I. The building finally opened on November 3, 1919, to replace the 1837 Third County Courthouse several miles away.

In 1919 the building housed one Supreme Court justice and one Surrogate who also acted as a justice of City Court, as well as the County Clerk and the District Attorney. County records were placed in the building and a law library was established the following year. The District Attorney moved out in 1979. The County Clerk, with the county records, moved across the street to 130 Stuyvesant Place in 1999, with the law library following in 2000. The Supreme Court, with the exception of the Matrimonial Parts, moved to the new fifth County Courthouse in late 2015.

The building is a New York City Landmark and is on the National Register of Historic Places.

== Design ==
Designed by the well-known architectural firm of Carrere and Hastings, who had earlier designed the neighboring 1906 Borough Hall, the building's architectural style has been variously described as Roman-inspired neoclassical, or Renaissance Revival with a Greek Revival portico. The L-shaped building is built on a hill sloping upwards from the harbor and shares the block with Borough Hall, from which it is separated on its front or harbor side by a formal French garden. A sweeping flight of stairs leads up from Richmond Terrace to a temple front pediment supported by six large Corinthian columns.

== See also ==
- List of New York City Designated Landmarks in Staten Island
- National Register of Historic Places listings in Richmond County, New York
