= Staten Island Borough Hall =

- U.S. National Register of Historic Places
- New York City Landmark
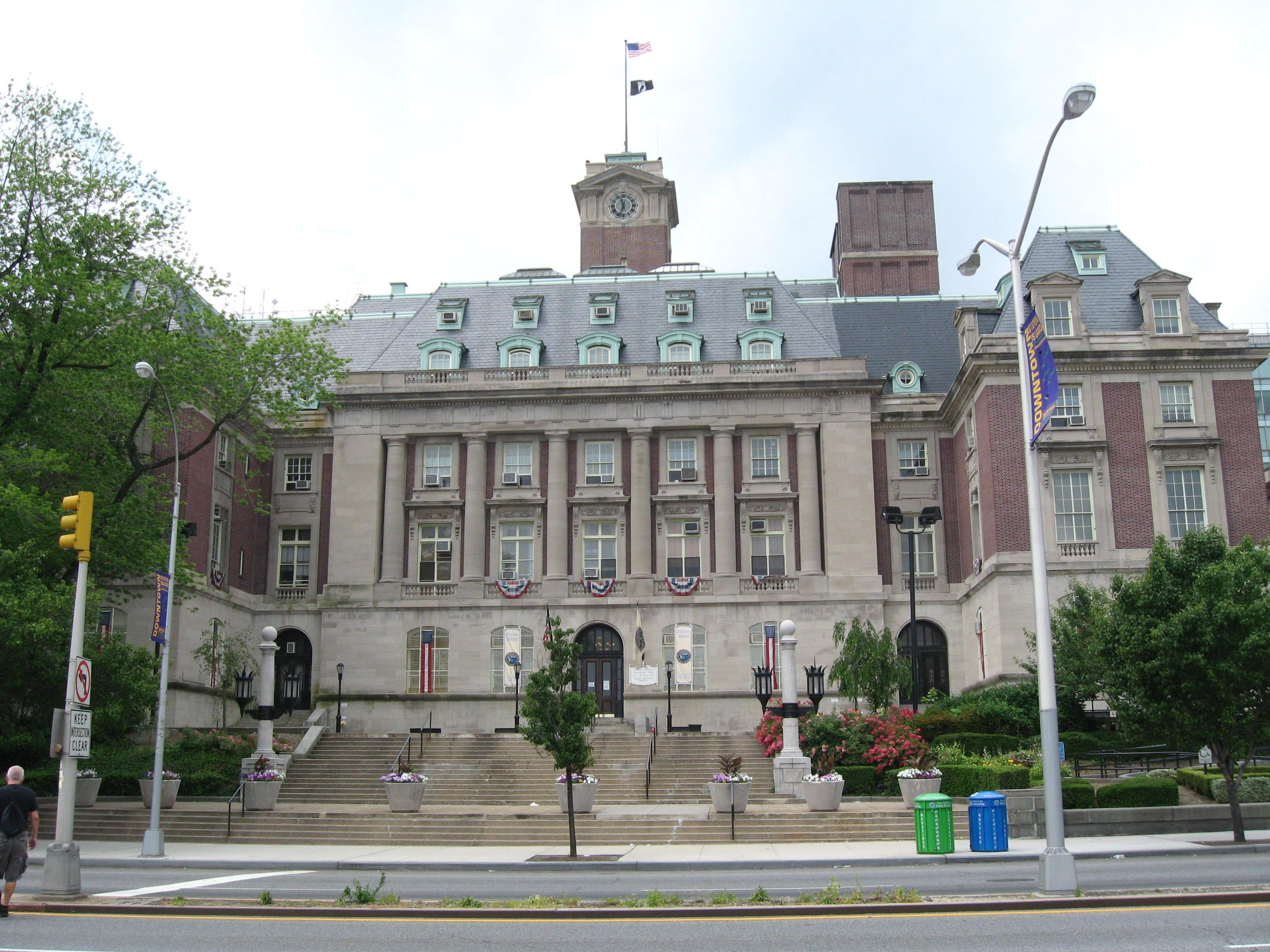
- Richmond Terrace facade

- Location within New York City
- Interactive map showing Staten Island Borough Hall
- Location: 10 Richmond Terrace, Staten Island, New York
- Coordinates: 40°38′33″N 74°4′35″W
- Area: 5 acres (2.0 ha) (including neighboring courthouse)
- Built: 1906
- Architect: Carrere & Hastings
- Architectural style: Beaux Arts, French Renaissance
- NRHP reference No.: 83004150

Significant dates
- Added to NRHP: October 6, 1983 (as Staten Island Borough Hall and Richmond County Courthouse)
- Designated NYCL: March 23, 1982

Staten Island Borough Hall is the primary municipal building for the borough of Staten Island in New York City. It is located at 10 Richmond Terrace, next to the Richmond County Courthouse and opposite the St. George Terminal of the Staten Island Ferry. Borough Hall houses the Borough President's office, offices of the Departments of Buildings and Transportation, and other civic offices.

The 1906 French Renaissance style brick and limestone building was designed by Carrere and Hastings, following the consolidation of New York City in 1898. John Carrere was a resident of Staten Island and he helped select the dramatic hilltop site of Borough Hall. The interior of the building contains a series of thirteen WPA murals illustrating events in Staten Island history, painted by local artist Frederick Charles Stahr.

The building is a New York City Landmark and was listed on the National Register of Historic Places in 1983.

== Murals ==
Borough Hall was originally designed with thirteen arched niches on the main floor, designed to showcase a series of murals. Each niche is 13 feet (4 m) high by 6.5 feet (2 m) wide. Frederick Charles Stahr, who grew up on Staten Island and had studied painting in Munich and at the Academy of Design in Rome, had been promised a commission by fellow Staten Islander John Carrere, but no money for murals was available when the building was finished in 1906.

Thirty years later, Stahr applied for funding through the Works Progress Administration, and the project was approved in 1936. Working out of a third-floor studio, Stahr created storybook style oil paintings on canvas over the next two years, which were cemented to Borough Hall's walls as he went along.

The thirteen murals depict Verrazzano's discovery of Staten Island in 1524; Henry Hudson's 1609 visit aboard the Dutch ship Halve Maen; two panels showing stoic Lenape natives trading furs for trinkets; French Huguenot farmers; British Admiral Howe taking charge of the island in 1776 and creating Fort Hill; the 1776 peace conference among Howe, Benjamin Franklin, John Adams and Edward Rutledge at the Conference House in Tottenville; the so-called Battle of St. Andrew's; British ships departing during Evacuation Day in 1783; the erection of Fort Richmond and Fort Tompkins in anticipation of the War of 1812; a stagecoach stopping at the Black Horse Tavern, which had been destroyed to accommodate road widening in 1934, three years prior to the 1937 painting; the Hotel Castleton, run by freed black men in the 19th century and destroyed by fire in 1907; the first Clifton to Tottenville railroad in 1860; and, finally, the Bayonne Bridge, showing a snappily-dressed Othmar Ammann, the bridge's designer, watching its construction sometime between 1928 and 1931.

== See also ==
- List of New York City borough halls and municipal buildings
- List of New York City Designated Landmarks in Staten Island
- National Register of Historic Places listings in Richmond County, New York
