= List of Staten Island Railway stations =

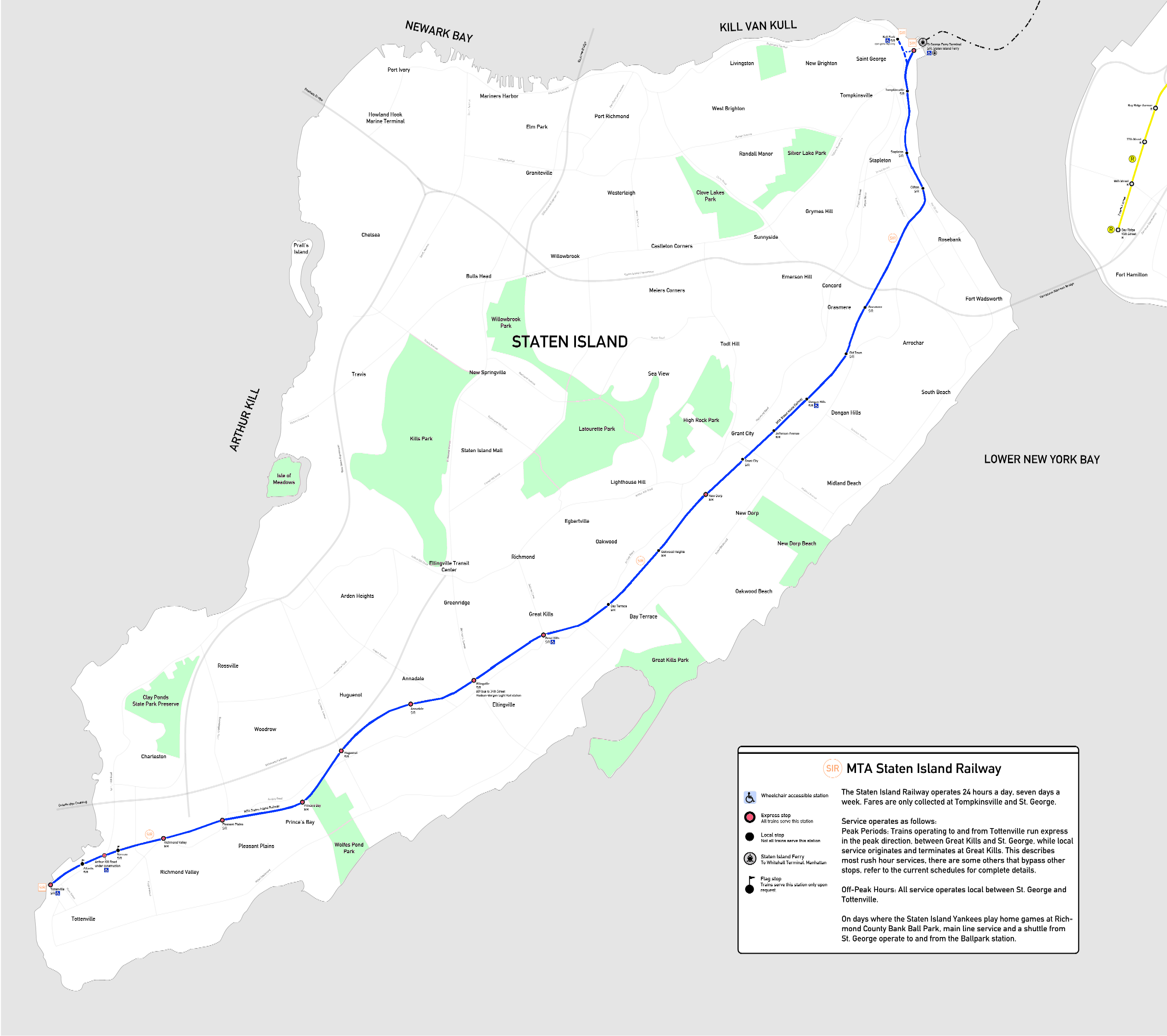
2009 Map of the Staten Island Railway, which includes the now-closed Nassau, Atlantic, and Richmond County Bank Ballpark stations, as well as the now-opened Arthur Kill station.

The Staten Island Railway (formerly known as the Staten Island Rapid Transit) is a rapid transit system on Staten Island, New York. Its operator has been the Metropolitan Transportation Authority of New York since 1971, whereas prior to that year it was owned by the Baltimore & Ohio Railroad (B&O).

== Main Line ==
This list contains all stations currently operating on the Staten Island Railway (SIR). All active SIR stations are located on the Main Line, which spans from the St. George Ferry Terminal to Tottenville. Stations tend to be built either above ground level on embankments or are open-cut stations built below ground level, but open to the sky.

Disabled access	Station is accessible by wheelchair

Name	Opened	Disabled access	Other names	Connections/Notes
St. George	March 7, 1886	Disabled access		Staten Island Ferry
Tompkinsville	July 31, 1884			
Stapleton	July 31, 1884; 1936			
Clifton	April 23, 1860		Vanderbilt's Landing	Only three cars can platform at the St. George-bound platform. This station was the original northern terminal of the line.
Grasmere	c. 1886			S53 bus to Bay Ridge, Brooklyn
Old Town	1937–1938		Old Town Road	
Dongan Hills	April 23, 1860	Disabled access	Garretson's	
Jefferson Avenue	1937–1938			
Grant City	April 23, 1860			
New Dorp	April 23, 1860	Disabled access		
Oakwood Heights	April 23, 1860		Richmond, then Court House, then Oakwood	
Bay Terrace	Early 1900s		Brendan, then Whitlock	
Great Kills	April 23, 1860	Disabled access	Gifford's	
Eltingville	April 23, 1860			Bus to Eltingville Transit Center and Staten Island Mall
Annadale	May 14, 1860; 1939			
Huguenot	June 2, 1860		Bloomingview, then Huguenot Park	
Prince's Bay	June 2, 1860		Lemon Creek; Princes Bay	
Pleasant Plains	June 2, 1860			
Richmond Valley	June 2, 1860			Only three cars can platform at this station. The former West Shore Line, which was used for freight, diverged south of this station.
Arthur Kill	January 21, 2017	Disabled access		This station opened in 2017 and replaced the Atlantic and Nassau stations.
Tottenville	June 2, 1860	Disabled access		Formerly connected to a ferry to Perth Amboy, New Jersey

== Disused and former stations ==
The majority of former stations are located in the middle of the Main Line between the Tottenville neighborhood and Charleston neighborhoods. The Atlantic and Nassau stations were replaced by the new Arthur Kill station that opened in January 2017; both stations were in poor condition was led their demolition four months after Arthur Kill opened. The North Shore Branch and South Beach Branch, which were closed to passenger service at midnight on Tuesday, March 31, 1953. A small western portion of the North Shore Branch that is disconnected to the Main Line is used for freight service, and a smaller eastern portion of the same branch provided seasonal service to the Richmond County Bank Ballpark station from 2001 to 2009. Restoration is being discussed along this mostly abandoned 6.1-mile (9.8 km) line as part of the Staten Island light rail plan. The South Beach Branch was abandoned and demolished except for a remaining stanchion on St. John's Avenue and the Robin Road Trestle. This 4.1-mile (6.6 km) line diverged from the Main Line south of the Clifton station and lay to the east of the Main Line.

Name	Line	Opened	Closed	Distance from St. George	Notes
Arlington	North Shore Branch	1889–1890	March 31, 1953	5.2 miles (8.4 km)	
Arrochar	South Beach Branch	March 8, 1886	March 31, 1953	3.2 miles (5.1 km)	
Atlantic	Main Line	1909-1911	January 21, 2017	26.1 miles (42.0 km)	
Bachmann	South Beach Branch	March 8, 1886	1937	2.0 miles (3.2 km)	
Belair Road	South Beach Branch	March 8, 1886	March 31, 1953	2.5 miles (4.0 km)	
Cedar Avenue	South Beach Branch	1931	March 31, 1953	3.5 miles (5.6 km)	
Elm Park	North Shore Branch	February 23, 1886	March 31, 1953	3.9 miles (6.3 km)	
Fort Wadsworth	South Beach Branch	March 8, 1886	March 31, 1953	2.7 miles (4.3 km)	
Harbor Road	North Shore Branch	1935–1937	March 31, 1953	4.9 miles (7.9 km)	
Lake Avenue	North Shore Branch	1937	March 31, 1953	4.3 miles (6.9 km)	
Livingston	North Shore Branch	February 23, 1886	March 31, 1953	1.8 miles (2.9 km)	
Mariners Harbor	North Shore Branch	Summer 1886	March 31, 1953	4.6 miles (7.4 km)	
Mount Loretto Orphanage	Mount Loretto Branch	1885	1950		This station was used for special excursions.
Nassau	Main Line	after 1922	January 21, 2017	25.7 miles (41.4 km)	Served the Nassau Smelting Company.
New Brighton	North Shore Branch	February 26, 1886	March 31, 1953	0.7 miles (1.1 km)	
Ocean Park	Main Line				Flag stop, south of Annadale, c.1890.
Port Ivory	North Shore Branch	1906	1948	6.1 miles (9.8 km)	Served the employees of Procter & Gamble's factory.
Port Richmond	North Shore Branch	February 26, 1886	March 31, 1953	3.0 miles (4.8 km)	
Richmond County Bank Ballpark	North Shore Branch	June 24, 2001	June 18, 2010	150 yards (140 m)	
Rosebank	South Beach Branch	March 8, 1886	March 31, 1953	2.1 miles (3.4 km)	
Sailors' Snug Harbor	North Shore Branch	February 26, 1886	March 31, 1953	1.2 miles (1.9 km)	
South Beach	South Beach Branch	1890	March 31, 1953	3.9 miles (6.3 km)	
Tower Hill	North Shore Branch	February 26, 1886	March 31, 1953	3.4 miles (5.5 km)	
Wentworth Avenue	South Beach Branch	1925	March 31, 1953	4.1 miles (6.6 km)	This likely was the shortest rapid transit station in the world.
West Brighton	North Shore Branch	February 26, 1886	March 31, 1953	2.4 miles (3.9 km)	
Woods of Arden	Main Line	1886	1894–1895	14.6 miles (23.5 km)	

== See also ==
- New York City Subway stations
- List of New York City Subway stations
- List of New York City Subway transfer stations
- List of New York City Subway terminals
- List of closed New York City Subway stations
- Accessibility of the Metropolitan Transportation Authority
