= History of the Staten Island Railway =

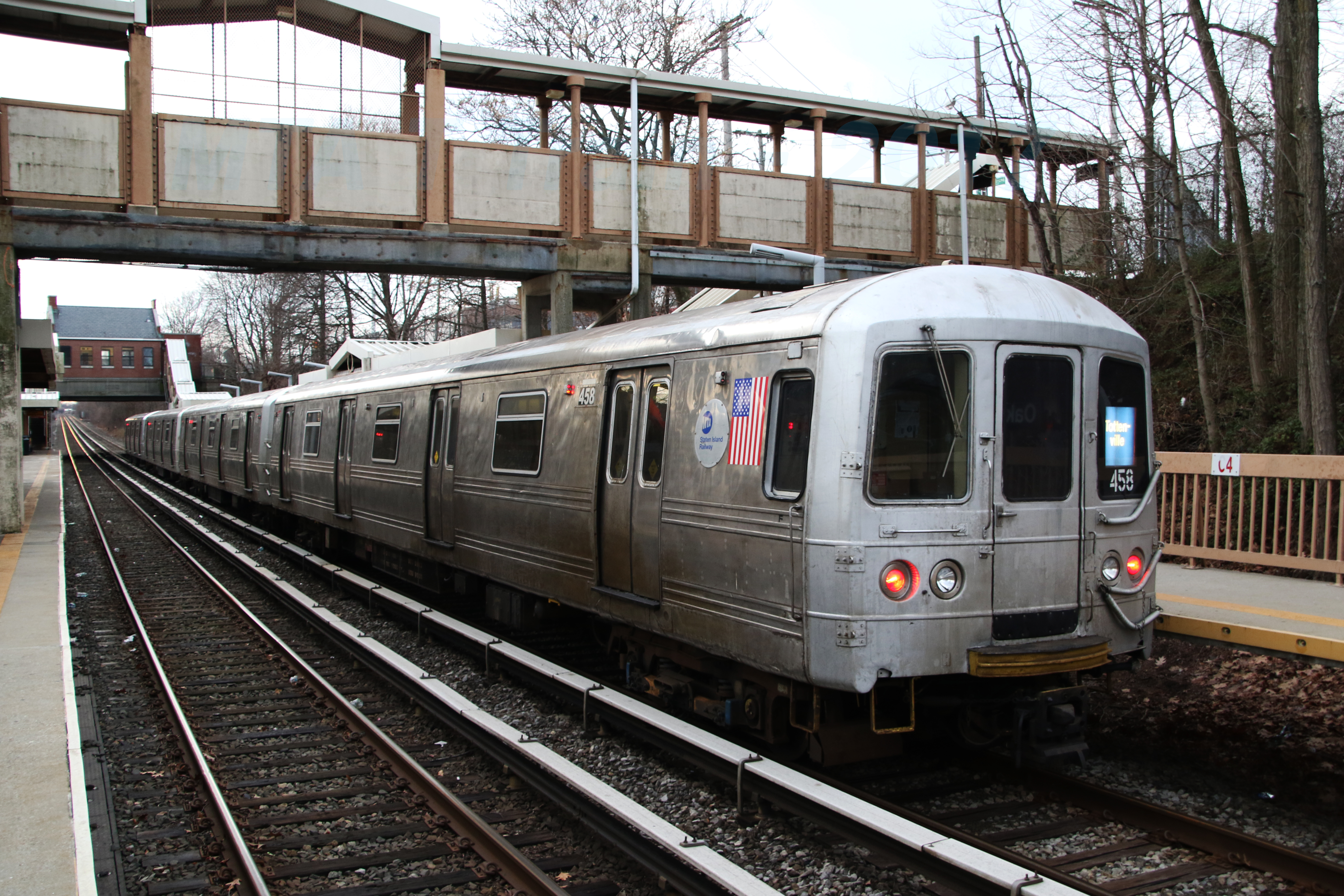
A Staten Island Railway local train of R44s at the Oakwood Heights station

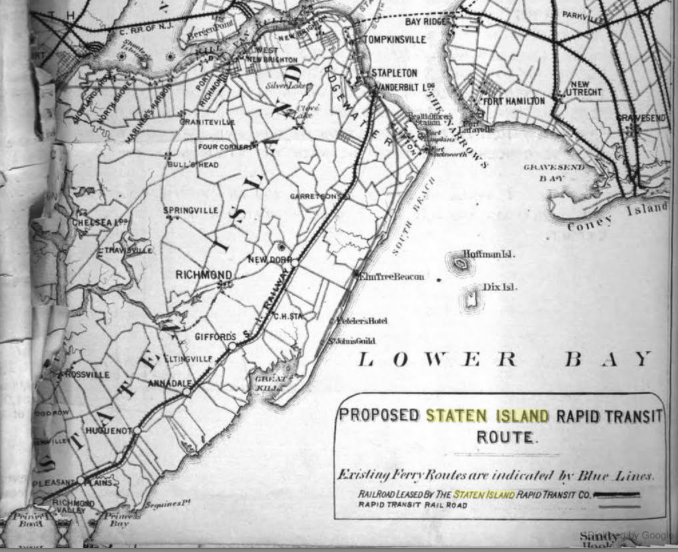
A plan from 1883 showing the planned routes of the North Shore and East Shore lines in addition to the then-existing line.

The Staten Island Railway (SIR) is the only rapid transit line in the New York City borough of Staten Island and is operated by the Staten Island Rapid Transit Operating Authority, a unit of the Metropolitan Transportation Authority. The railway was historically considered a standard railroad line, but today only the western portion of the North Shore Branch, which is disconnected from the rest of the SIR, is used by freight and is connected to the national railway system.

While the first rail proposal for rail service on Staten Island was issued in 1836, construction did not begin until 1855 after the project was attempted a second time under the name Staten Island Railroad. This attempt was successful due to the financial backing of William Vanderbilt. The line opened in 1860 and ran from Tottenville to Vanderbilt's Landing and connected with ferries to Perth Amboy, New Jersey and New York, respectively. After the Westfield ferry disaster at Whitehall Street Terminal in 1871, the railroad went into receivership and was reorganized into the Staten Island Railway Company in 1873. In the 1880s, Erastus Wiman planned a system of rail lines encircling the island using a portion of the existing rail line, and organized the Staten Island Rapid Transit Railroad in 1880, in cooperation with the Baltimore & Ohio Railroad (B&O), which wanted an entry into New York. B&O gained a majority stake in the line in 1885, and by 1890 new extensions to the line were in service. In 1890, the Arthur Kill Bridge opened, connecting the island to New Jersey. This route proved to be a major freight corridor. After a period of financial turmoil in the 1890s which saw both B&O and the Staten Island Rapid Transit Railroad company enter bankruptcy, the railroad was restructured as the Staten Island Rapid Transit Railway (SIRT), and was purchased by the B&O in 1899.

In 1924, SIRT began electrification of its lines, to comply with the Kaufman Act, which had become law the previous year. New train cars, designed to be compatible with subway service, were ordered, and electric service was inaugurated on the system's three branches in 1925. Through the 1930s and 1940s grade-crossing elimination projects were completed on the three branches. During World War II, freight traffic on the SIRT increased dramatically, briefly making it profitable. In 1948, the New York City Board of Transportation took over all of the bus lines on Staten Island, resulting in a decrease in bus fares from five cents per zone to seven cents for the whole island. Riders of the SIRT flocked to the buses, resulting in a steep drop in ridership. Service on the branches was subsequently reduced. In 1953, the SIRT discontinued service on the North Shore Branch and South Beach Branch. The South Beach Branch was abandoned shortly thereafter while the North Shore Branch continued to carry freight. While the SIRT threatened to discontinue service on the Tottenville Branch, the service was preserved as New York City stepped in to subsidize the operation. The last grade crossings on the line were eliminated in 1965. In 1971, New York City purchased the Tottenville line, and the line's operation was turned over to the Staten Island Rapid Transit Operating Authority, a division of the state-operated Metropolitan Transportation Authority (MTA). Freight service continued until 1991.

Improvements were made under MTA operations. The line received its first new train cars since the 1920s, and several stations were renovated. The MTA rebranded the Staten Island Rapid Transit as the MTA Staten Island Railway (SIR) in 1994. Fares on the line between Tompkinsville and Tottenville were eliminated in 1997 with the introduction of the MetroCard. In 2010, fare collection was reintroduced at Tompkinsville. A new station on the main line, Arthur Kill, opened in 2017, replacing the deteriorated Nassau and Atlantic stations. It was the first new station opened on the main line in seventy years. While the railway does not serve residents on the western or northern sides of the borough, light rail and bus rapid transit have been proposed for these corridors. Freight service in northwestern Staten Island was restored in the 2000s.

== Corporate history ==
Years	Company	Abbreviation	Notes
1836–1838	Staten Island Rail-Road Company		Failed attempt to build the railway.
1851–1873	Staten Island Railroad Company	SIRR	Created by Vanderbilt in 1851; was sold to Law in 1872, and then sold to the Staten Island Railway Company in 1873.
1873–1884	Staten Island Railway Company	SIRW	Created to assume operations of the SIRR, and was leased by the SIRTR in 1884. It continued to operate as a separate company.
1880–1899	Staten Island Rapid Transit Railroad Company	SIRTR	Created to build extensions; was sold to the SIRT in 1899.
1899–1971	Staten Island Rapid Transit Railway Company	SIRT	Created to operate the SIRTR; was sold by the B&O to the MTA in 1971. Was commonly known as the SIRT.
1971–present	Staten Island Rapid Transit Operating Authority	SIRTOA	Created in 1971 to transfer operations of the SIRT from the B&O to the Metropolitan Transportation Authority (MTA); publicly known as MTA Staten Island Railway (SIR) since 1994.

== Early history ==
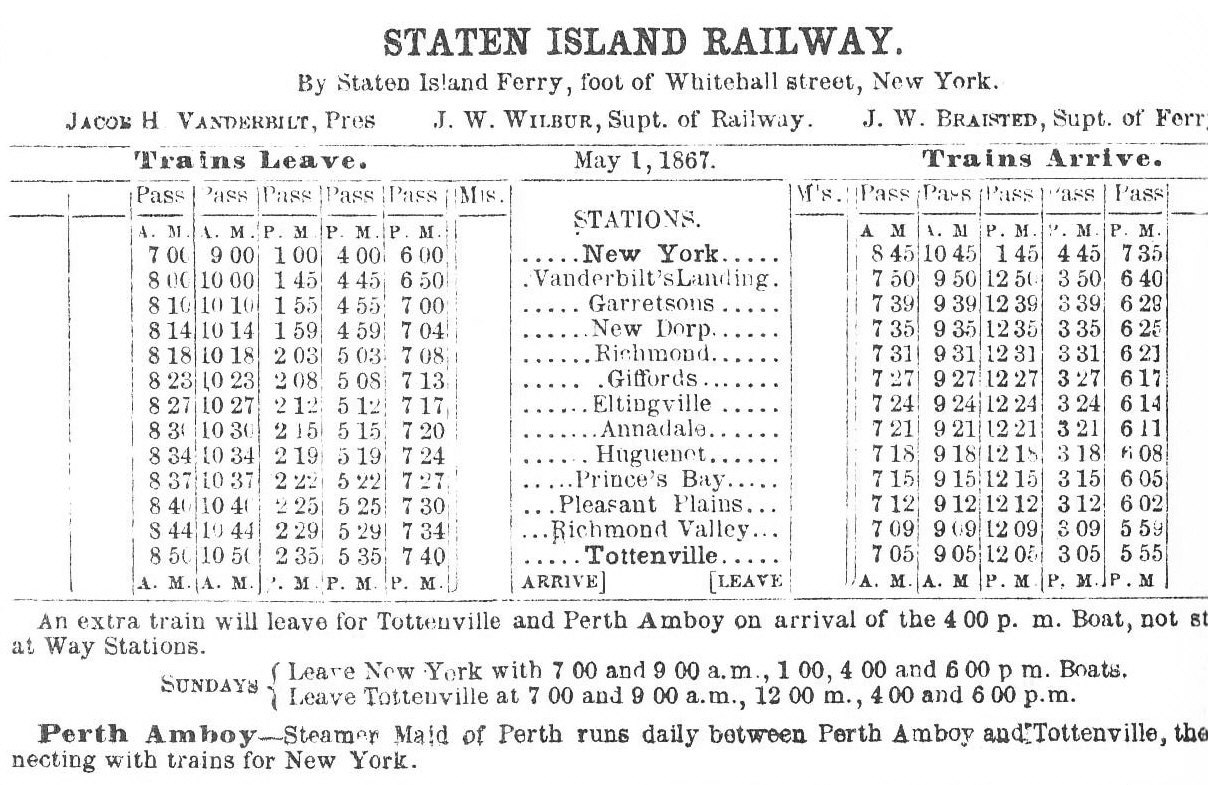
SIRT timetable, circa 1867

The railway's predecessor, the Staten Island Rail-Road Company, was incorporated on May 21, 1836. However, the company lost its charter in 1838 because the railroad was not built within two years after it was incorporated.

Attempts to start a rail line on the island were restarted in 1849 and 1850, when residents of Perth Amboy and Staten Island held meetings concerning a possible Tottenville-to-Stapleton line. Like the previous attempt in 1836, they faced financial difficulties, and sought out the help of William Vanderbilt—a son of Cornelius "Commodore" Vanderbilt and a resident of Staten Island. Vanderbilt had conceived of such a railroad as a way to reduce the monopoly of the Camden and Amboy Railroad, which was the only mean of reaching Philadelphia. Since the plan conceived by the local residents followed Vanderbilt's proposed route, he helped charter the Staten Island Railroad Company (SIRR) on August 2, 1851, in order to build the rail line. The articles of association for the company were filed on October 18, 1851.

The railroad's charter gave it two years to be built, but after encountering multiple difficulties, the deadline was extended by two years in 1853, and a further three years in January 1855. Construction eventually commenced in November 1855.

On April 23, 1860, passenger operations began between Vanderbilt's Landing and Eltingville A second locomotive was added to the line on May 5, 1860, with the remainder of the line expected to be completed in the following month.

=== Ferry expansion: 1860–1873 ===
Over the next month, the remainder of the line was built between Annadale and Pleasant Plains as a single-track line, with a passing siding at Huguenot. The line was extended to Annadale on May 14, 1860, and was completed to Tottenville on June 2, 1860, with a formal opening of the railroad.

In March 1864, William Vanderbilt, the then president of the railroad company, bought the ferries serving Vanderbilt's Landing, which were operated by attorney George Law. This brought both the railroad and the ferries under the same company. In 1865, the railroad took over operation of the New York & Richmond Ferry Company, and would later assume direct responsibility for operating the ferry service to Manhattan. The Perth Amboy and Staten Island ferries were also taken over by the railroad under the leadership of Jacob Vanderbilt, who increased service.

On July 30, 1871, the boiler of the ferry "Westfield" exploded at Whitehall Street Terminal, killing 85 and injuring hundreds. As a result of the disaster, on March 28, 1872, the railroad and the ferry went into receivership. On September 17, 1872, the property of the company was sold to George Law in foreclosure, with the exception of the ferry "Westfield", which was purchased by Horace Theall. Some time after, Law and Theall sold the SIRR and ferry to the Staten Island Railway Company (SIRW). The charter for the SIRW was created on March 20, 1873. The ferry and rail services were split into separate companies to prevent problems with one from leading to the demise of the other, while ensuring that connecting service could still be provided for passengers.

=== Organization: 1880–1884 ===
By 1880, the SIRW was barely operational Although it was floundering, the railway become the centerpiece of a plan to develop the island by a Canadian, Erastus Wiman. To this end the Staten Island Rapid Transit Railroad Company (SIRTR) was organized on March 25, 1880 and incorporated on April 14, 1880.

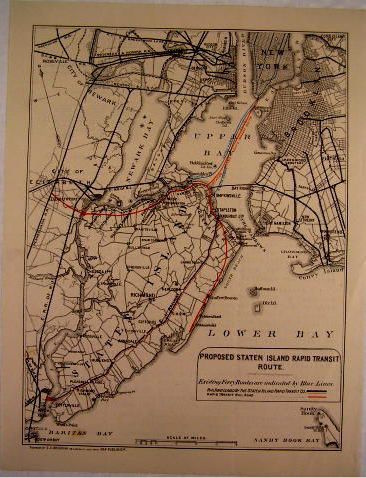
Proposed Staten Island Transit route map. "Existing Ferry Routes are indicated by blue lines." Issued c. 1884 by E.C. Bridgman, NY, Map Publisher.

Wiman's plan called for a system encircling the island using two miles of the SIRW between Vanderbilt's Landing and Tompkinsville. His plan also called for the centralization of all ferries from one terminal, to allow for transportation to New York City and New Jersey. Wiman approached Robert Garrett, president of the Baltimore & Ohio Railroad (B&O), to back the plan, and Garrett agreed. The SIRTR began to seek legislation to acquire various rights-of-way needed to implement Wiman's plan.

On April 3, 1883, the SIRTR gained control of the SIRW and its boats. On the same date, at the annual meeting of the SIRW, Erasmus Wiman gained control of the railway by being elected to the board of Directors of the Railroad and becoming the railway's president. At the meeting, Wiman laid out his proposals for rail lines on Staten Island. Wiman also proposed a bridge across the Arthur Kill from Tottenville to Perth Amboy.

On June 27, 1883, a meeting of the directors of the SIRW and the SIRTR formally ratified the merger of the two companies under the leadership of Wiman, who was named president.

On June 30, 1883, the SIRTR leased the SIRW for a term of 99 years, to become effective when the line opened between Clifton and Tompkinsville. The line between Vanderbilt's Landing and Tottenville continued to be operated by the SIRW. While the control of the railroad included control of Vanderbilt's ferry, the North Shore Ferry was leased separately and was operated by Starin, whose lease was set to expire on May 1, 1884. On July 18, 1884, the SIRTR outbid Starin for the North Shore operation.

=== Expansion: 1884–1890 ===
Around March, 1884, grading work on the section between Clifton (previously Vanderbilt's Landing) and Tompkinsville began; the section opened on July 31 that year, with passengers services beginning the following day. The section was further expanded to St. George in 1885 to connect with the ferries to Manhattan.

Construction of the North Shore Branch began on March 17, 1884, and was completed the following year. The branch opened for service on February 23, 1886, with trains terminating at Elm Park. A month later, on March 7, 1886, a new St. George Terminal opened; North Shore trains operated between Elm Park and St. George, and East Shore trains operated between St. George and Tottenville. In mid-1886, the North Shore Branch opened a new terminal at Erastina Place.

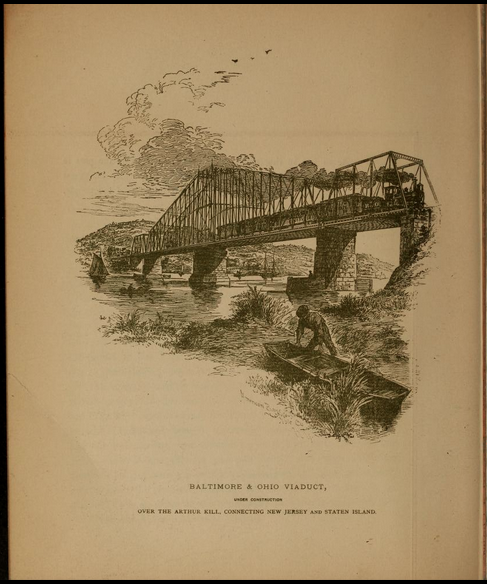
Baltimore & Ohio Viaduct Under Construction Over the Arthur Kill Connecting Staten Island and New Jersey

On June 16, 1886, Congress passed a bill authorizing the construction of a 500-foot (150 m) swing bridge over the Arthur Kill, which Wiman had proposed three years prior. The bridge was completed on June 13, 1888, just three days before the completion deadline set by Congress. The first train to cross the bridge was on January 1, 1890.

Shortly after the construction of the Arthur Kill Bridge, the North Shore tracks were extended to the bridge; however, even a few years after the extension, most trains terminated at Erastina.

A 1.7-mile-long (2.7 km) branch, then known as the Arrochar Branch, was opened to Arrochar on January 1, 1888, as a double-tracked line. The branch split off at Clifton Junction and had two stops—Fort Wadsworth and Arrochar. During fiscal year 1893, the SIRTR purchased land to extend the line 1.75 miles (2.82 km) to South Beach and the 2.3-mile (3.7 km) South Beach Branch was completed in 1894.

The B&O made various proposals for a railroad between Staten Island and New Jersey. The accepted plan consisted of a 5.25 miles (8.45 km)-long section from the Arthur Kill to meet the Jersey Central at Cranford, through Roselle Park and Linden in Union County. In October 1888, the B&O created the subsidiary Baltimore and New York Railway (B&NY) to build the line, which was to be operated by the SIRTR. Construction started in 1889 and the line was finished later that year. On July 1, 1890, all of the B&O's freight traffic started using the line.

=== Reorganization: 1896–1899 ===
The B&O was bankrupt by February 1896; in its attempt to reach the New York market, its western lines fell into disrepair. J.P. Morgan replaced the railroad's top management and refinanced it.

In 1892, trolley service was inaugurated on Staten Island; it attracted passengers from the SIRTR, ending the railroad's monopoly. As a result, the railroad went into bankruptcy. On April 20, 1899, the railroad company and all of the real and personal property held in the company was sold at auction for $2,000,000 to representatives of the B&O.

== Early and mid-20th centuries ==
=== Pennsylvania Railroad control: 1900–1913 ===
In 1899, Alexander Cassatt, president of the Pennsylvania Railroad (PRR), first purchased B&O stock in 1899. By 1901, most of the stock was under PRR control, and improvements were made to the rail line in May of that year. PRR control of the line decreased as a new PRR president had different priorities, and in 1906, the PRR sold half of its B&O stock to the Union Pacific Railroad. The remainder of the PRR's stock in the B&O was sold to the Union Pacific in 1913.

Under PRR control, the B&O was profitable again and became a stronger railroad. The PRR bought four large double-decker steamers to halve the travel time on the Staten Island Ferry. Even though the PRR improved ferry service, the B&O was ejected from the Whitehall Street terminal on October 25, 1905, when the city took ownership of the ferry and terminals. The city built a new St. George Terminal for $2,318,720.

Around 1902, a new station was constructed at Whitlock to serve a new community being built by the Whitlock Realty Company on the South Shore. In December 1912, the station was abandoned and replaced with a station named Bay Terrace 1,594 feet (486 m) to the south in anticipation of a population shift.

On March 22, 1910, the SIRT petitioned the PSC to allow it to discontinue its service at Annadale station and replace it with a new station of the same name 450 feet (140 m) to the west. Trains began using the new station on November 18, 1910. In addition, a new freight house went into operation at Clifton in 1910, and new 75 pounds (34 kg) rails were installed as far south as Richmond Valley on the Perth Amboy Division.

Between 1911 and 1917, the city ordered the elimination of most of the grade level crossings due to safety concerns. The remaining crossings were required to have gates installed.

On March 25, 1913, work began on a double tracking of the Perth Amboy Division between Huguenot and Prince's Bay. The section went into service on June 18, 1913, leaving the section between Prince's Bay and Pleasant Plains as the only single-track section on the Perth Amboy Division.

On August 7, 1913, work began on the construction of a new two-story switch tower at the former site of the station at Amboy Road. At the same time, the Pleasant Plains station house was completely renovated, and received electric lights on the platform and in the station house. The new station opened on October 8, 1913, and the tower was completed shortly afterwards.

=== Electrification: 1923–1925 ===
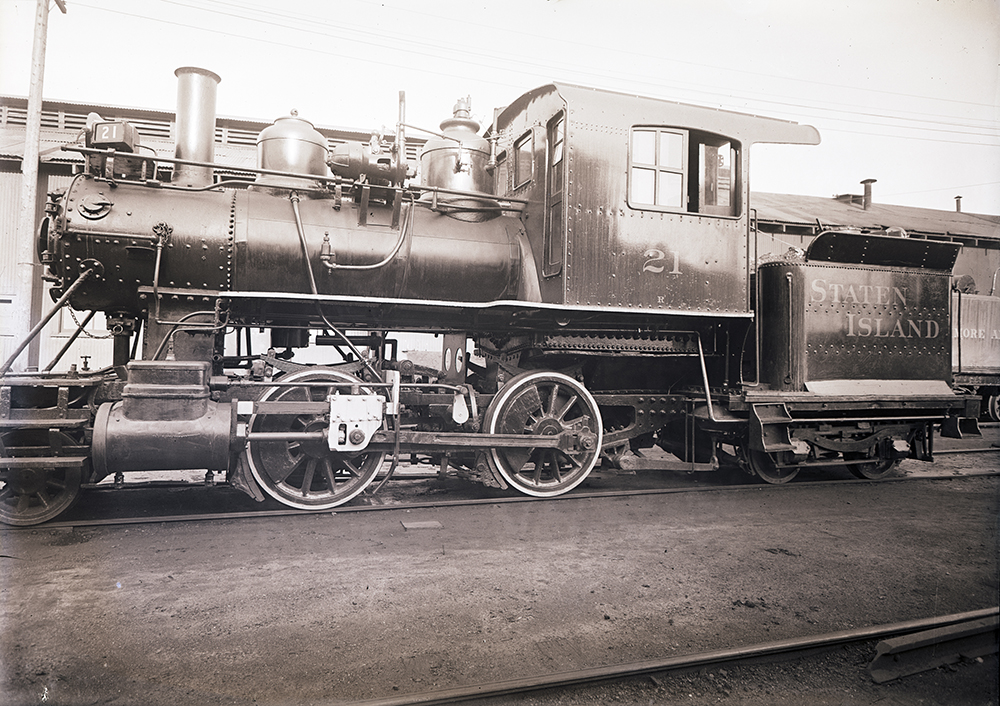
A view of a steam locomotive that used to run on the SIRT prior to electrification.

On June 2, 1923, the Kaufman Act was signed by Governor Al Smith, mandating that all railroads in New York City–including the SIRT—be electrified by January 1, 1926. As a result, the B&O drew up electrification plans, which were submitted to the PSC. The plans were approved by the PSC on May 1, 1924, and construction began on August 1, 1924. The SIRT ordered ninety electric motors and ten trailers (later converted to motors) from the Standard Steel Car Company to replace the old steam equipment. These cars, the ME-1s, were designed to be similar to the Standards in use by the BMT.

The first electric train was operated on the South Beach Branch between South Beach and Fort Wadsworth on May 20, 1925, and regular electric operation began on the branch on June 5, 1925. Electric service began on the Perth Amboy sub-division on July 1, 1925. The North Shore Branch's electrification was completed on December 25, 1925. Following the electrification of all three branches, service was increased by nineteen trains on the Perth Amboy sub-division, by the fifteen trains on the South Beach Branch, and by five trains on the North Shore Branch.

Because of the high cost of electrification, however, St. George and Arlington Yards, along with the Mount Loretto Spur, and the Travis Branch were not electrified. Thirteen steam engines were retired and four new, wholly automatic substations opened at South Beach, Old Town Road, Eltingville, and Tottenville.

A modern signaling system was put into place in the Saint George Yards, allowing one dispatcher to do all the work. The Clifton Junction Shops were updated to maintain electric equipment rather than steam equipment, and a large portion of the yard was electrified. Grade crossing elimination began between Prince's Bay and Pleasant Plains.

In the end of 1924, work began on a project to elevate the track to eliminate six grade crossings on the Perth Amboy Division between Pleasant Plains and Prince's Bay and to add 0.82 miles (1.32 km) of double-track to complete the double-tracking of the entire line. The project was completed in 1926.

=== Expansion: 1926–1948 ===
In the 1920s, a branch was built to haul materials to construct the Outerbridge Crossing. The branch ran along the West Shore from the Richmond Valley station, and originally ended at Allentown Lane in Charleston, past the end of Drumgoole Boulevard. The branch was cut back south of the bridge after the bridge was completed. The Gulf Oil Corporation opened a dock and tank farm along the Arthur Kill in 1928; to serve it, the Travis Branch was built south from Arlington Yard into the marshes of the island's western shore to Gulfport. The B&O proposed to join the two branches along the West Shore, but the proposal was canceled because of the Great Depression.

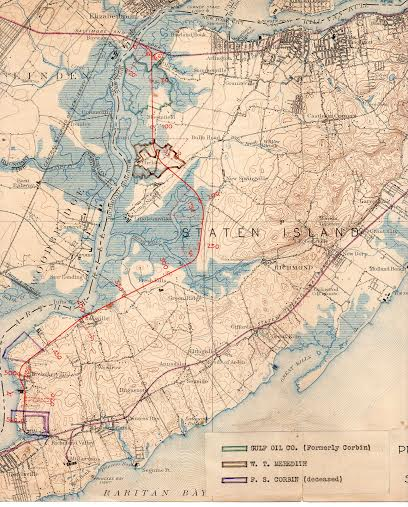
This map from 1922 shows the proposed connected West Shore Line.

In 1931, Cedar Avenue station opened with the construction of wooden platforms at the Cedar Avenue grade crossing on the South Beach Branch.

On September 14, 1932, the Transit Commission approved plans filed six years earlier to eliminate eleven grade crossings in Dongan Hills and Grasmere The project was completed in 1934 with a cost of $1,576,000.

The East Shore sub-division was elevated in 1936–1937 to remove several grade crossings. On the North Shore sub-division, the Port Richmond-Tower Hill viaduct was built to remove eight grade crossings. The viaduct opened on February 25, 1937, marking the final part of a $6,000,000 grade crossing elimination project on Staten Island, which eliminated 34 grade crossings on the north and south shores.

Between July 13, 1938 and October 1940, a grade crossing elimination project was undertaken between Great Kills and Huguenot, eliminating seven grade crossings and costing $2,136,000, which was partially paid for by the city, state, and Progress Work Administration funds. Four stations—Great Kills, Eltingville, Annadale and Huguenot—were replaced with new stations along the rebuilt tracks.

In 1940, grade crossing eliminations were completed in Richmond Valley and Tottenville. The Richmond Valley project eliminated the crossing at Richmond Valley Road and cost $300,000 while the Tottenville project eliminated seven crossings—including one at Main Street—and cost $997,000.

On December 31, 1944, two B&O subsidiaries, the Baltimore and New York Railway and the SIRT, were merged due to World War II. At the time, the SIRT carried 3.2 million tons of freight, while the B&NY line handled 742,000 troops and 100,000 prisoners-of-war.

On June 25, 1946, a fire destroyed the terminal at Saint George, killing three people and causing damage worth $22,000,000. The terminal for Staten Island Rapid Transit trains, Twenty rail cars, and the four ships used for Manhattan service were also destroyed in the fire. On June 8, 1951, a modern replacement terminal for Saint George opened, although portions of the terminal were phased into service at earlier dates.

On June 14, 1948, a bill to permit the SIRT to widen its railroad tunnel at the Saint George Ferry Terminal was signed into law. The tunnel was widened 19 feet (5.8 m) for a distance of 456 feet (139 m) to allow for a third track to be layed.

=== Service scaledowns, discontinuation of South and North Shore lines, and the end of B&O operation: 1947–1971 ===
On October 28, 1947, the SIRT filed with the Interstate Commerce Commission (ICC) to get permission to discontinue ferry service between Tottenville and Perth Amboy Ferry Slip in Perth Amboy, New Jersey. Nearly a year later, on September 22, 1948, the ICC allowed the SIRT to abandon the ferry. The ferry operation was transferred to Sunrise Ferries of Elizabeth, New Jersey on October 16. In 1963, Perth Amboy ferry service was discontinued.

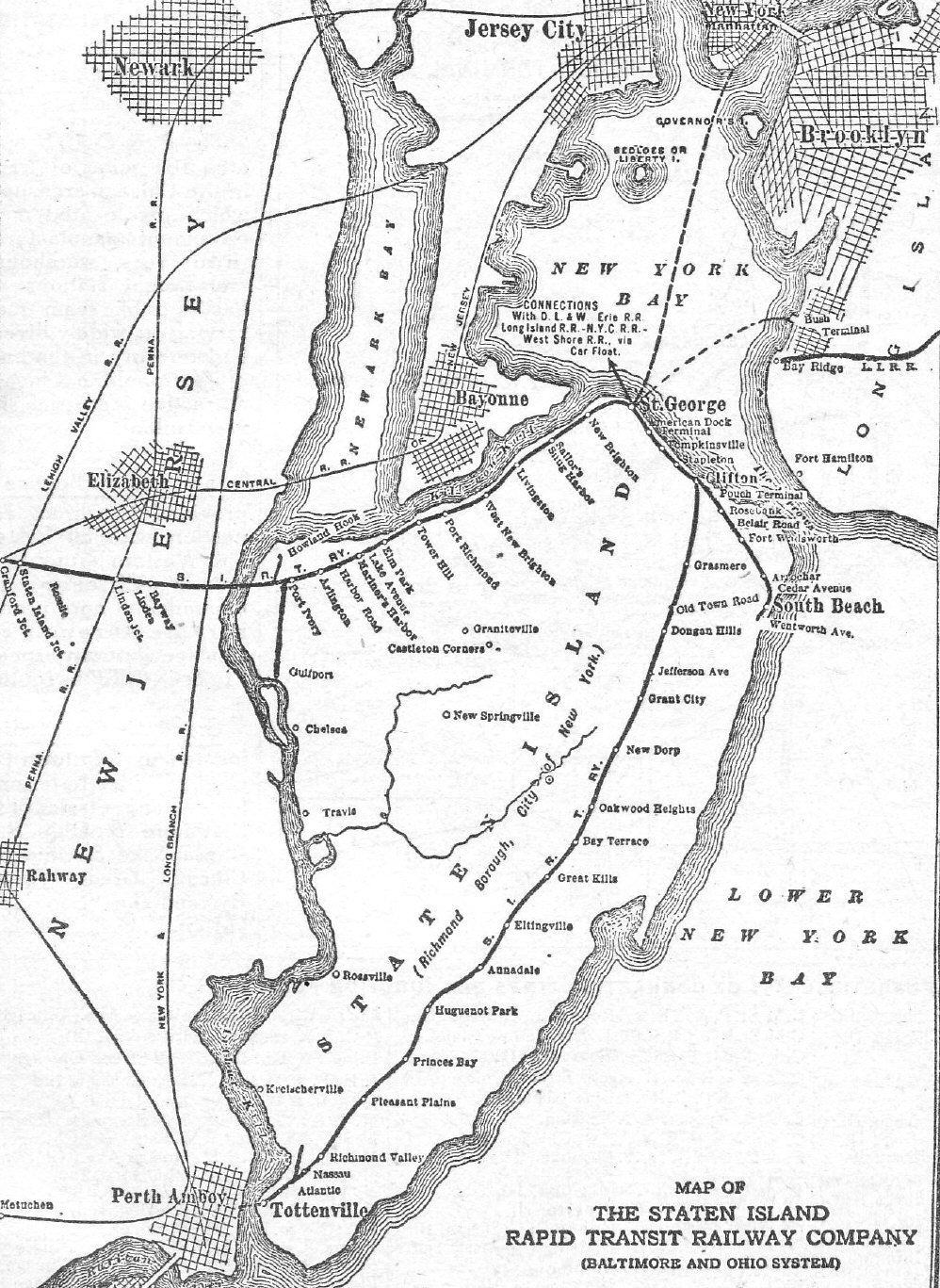
This map of the Staten Island Rapid Transit from 1952 shows the system at its greatest extent, and was published a year before service on the North Shore and South Beach branches was discontinued.

On July 1, 1948, the New York City Board of Transportation took over all of the bus lines on Staten Island. As a result, the bus fare on Staten Island dropped from five cents per zone (twenty cents Tottenville to the ferry) to seven cents for the whole island, to match the fare of the other city-owned bus lines. The cheaper bus fare resulted in the number of passengers the SIRT carried to drop from 12.3 million passengers in 1947, to 4.4 million in 1949.

Due to the loss of ridership, on August 28, 1948, the SIRT announced it would reduce service on all three branches on September 5. The reduction of trips resulted in the firing of 30 percent of the company's personnel.

On May 20, 1949, the SIRT announced it intended to discontinue all of its passenger services and that it would seek permission from the PSC to do so, citing the loss of $1,061,716 in 1948. After multiple hearings, on December 19, 1952, the PSC gave the SIRT permission to discontinue service on the North Shore Branch and South Beach Branch after March 31, 1953, because of city-operated bus competition. Shortly thereafter, the South Beach Branch was abandoned, though the North Shore Branch continued to carry freight. By 1955, the third rails on both of the lines were removed.

On September 7, 1954, the SIRT made an application to discontinue all passenger service on the Tottenville sub-division on October 7, 1954. The PSC warned that if it discontinued its passenger service, action would be taken to remove the SIRT's parent company, the B&O Railroad, from Staten Island. A large city subsidy allowed passenger service on the Tottenville sub-division to continue.

On December 13, 1956, the PSC approved an agreement between the B&O and New York City that ensured the Tottenville line would continue to operate; as part of the deal, New York City leased the line's passenger facilities for 20 years and received a small percentage of the line's net income. In addition, the city repaid all taxes owed by the railroad to the city. The agreement went into effect on January 1, 1957. On August 25, 1960, the Board of Estimate approved an amendment to the contract to increase the annual subsidy after the SIRT lost $1,100,000 in 1959. Over the next ten years, the aid was increased from $4,000,000 to $8,400,000.

In November 1947, the Arthur Kill swing bridge was knocked off its center pier foundation by a passing oil tanker, rendering the bridge useless. Freight had to be rerouted through float bridges, with most of it passing through the Central Railroad of New Jersey's yards. Work on a replacement span started in 1955, and was completed on August 25, 1959. The new bridge was a single track, 558-foot (170 m) vertical lift bridge.

On April 5, 1962, a fire at Clifton Yard destroyed seven ME-1 train cars and a warehouse, adding to 13 lost in two previous fires and two that were scrapped, leaving the SIRT with only 48 cars to operate regular service.

==== Final grade-crossing elimination (accidents/incidents): 1960–1964 ====
On November 7, 1960, an eight-year-old girl was killed and 31 children were injured when a train struck a crowded school bus as it was about to exit the crossing. A grand jury had previously ordered the closure of this crossing and 12 others along this stretch of the line, after a train killed a high-school girl at a crossing eight blocks away in December 1959. As a result, Staten Island Borough President Albert Maniscalco ordered the closure of this grade crossing on November 10, 1960, and announced he expected work to begin the following year.

On August 29, 1964, the PSC approved a $10,923,000 project to eliminate the last remaining grade-crossings on the line between the Jefferson Avenue and Grant City stations. As part of the project, new platforms and station buildings were built at New Dorp and Grant City, and new platforms were built at Jefferson Avenue.

== MTA acquisition ==
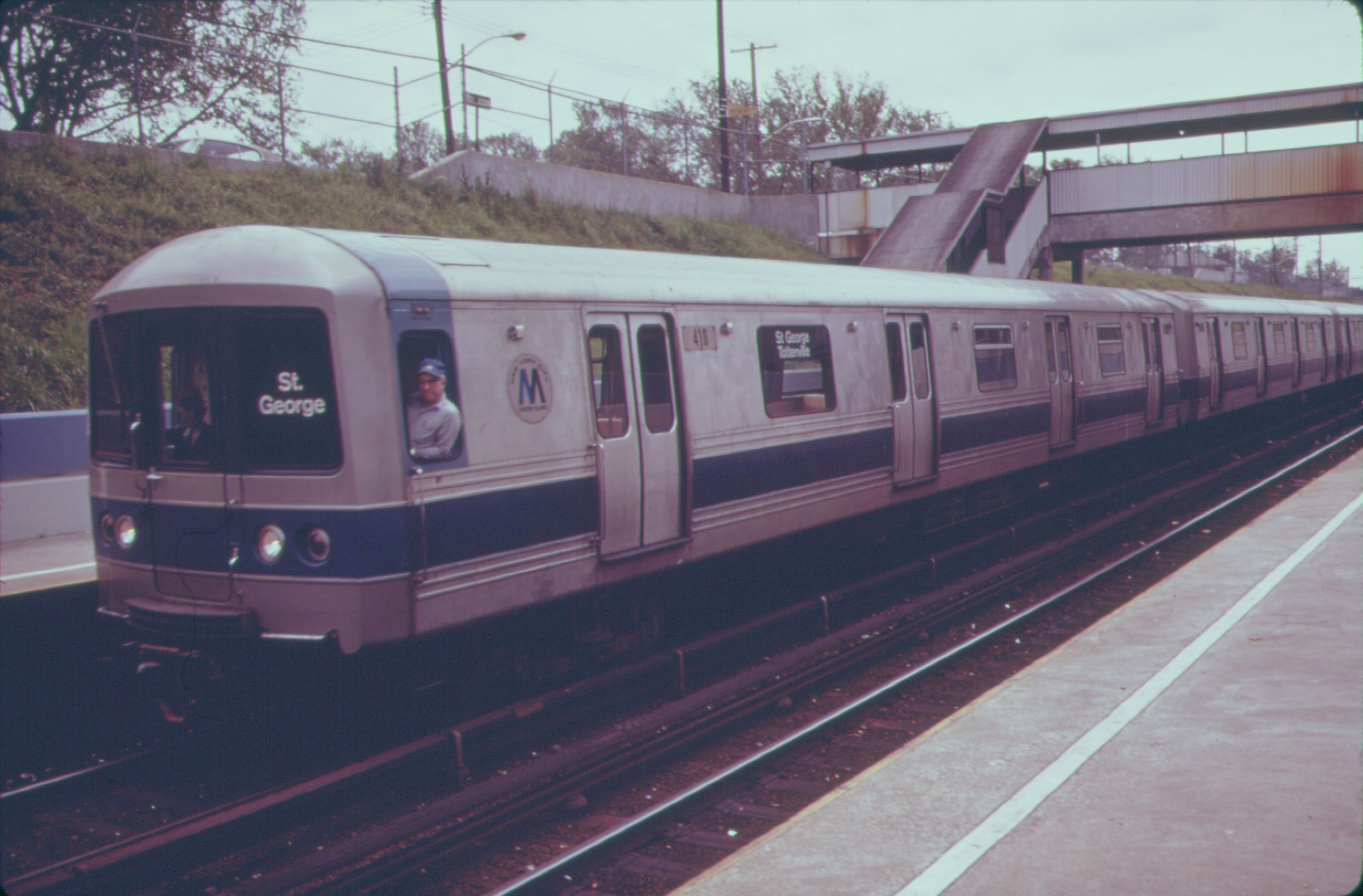
A view of the new R44 train cars put into service once the rail line was under the auspices of the Metropolitan Transportation Authority.

In May 1968, the President of the Metropolitan Transportation Authority (MTA), William Ronan, proposed that New York City take control of the SIRT and spend $25 million on modernizing the line. On December 18, 1969, the Board of Estimate approved the purchase of the SIRT for $1 and the use of $3.5 million to purchase the line's 48 cars, 70 acres (28 ha) of real estate, the air rights over the tracks, and the line's Clifton Shops. As part of the agreement, the B&O would continue to operate freight service over the line once a day.

On January 1, 1970, New York City's lease of the Tottenville line was terminated; after that date the city reimbursed the railroad for its passenger deficits. On May 29, 1970, New York City and the SIRT entered an agreement for NYC to purchase the Tottenville line, as part of which the SIRT was reserved the right to operate freight service over the line. The city was required to ensure the track was in good condition for SIRT's freight operations. The freight operation was reorganized as the Staten Island Railroad Corporation. On June 29, 1970, the Staten Island Rapid Transit Operating Authority was incorporated as a subsidiary of the state's MTA to acquire and operate the SIRT.

On April 21, 1971, the ICC approved the city's purchase of the line. On July 1, 1971, operation of the Tottenville line was turned over to the Staten Island Rapid Transit Operating Authority, a division of the state's MTA. The line itself was purchased by the City of New York for $1 and the MTA paid the B&O $3.5 million for the line's equipment. Grade crossings along the Tottenville line had to be removed by the B&O to finalize the deal. Grade crossings were supposed to have been eliminated in the 1930s but a lack of finances—partially resulting from the Great Depression and World War II—prevented it.

=== Despite MTA improvements, problems persist: 1970s and 1980s ===
On June 15, 1972, five 1955-built, air-conditioned coaches on loan from the Long Island Rail Road (LIRR) went into service on the SIRT. One three-car train made one round trip during the morning and operated again during the afternoon peak. As a result of previous tests, the edges of the platforms at St. George were trimmed for the extra clearance required by the LIRR cars, which were 85 feet (26 m) long. The cars were only 15 feet (4.6 m) longer than the 45 cars in operation but had a seating capacity of 123 passengers—almost double the capacity of the other coaches.

On February 28, 1973, the first six new R44 cars were put into service on the SIRT. These were part of a 52-car order from the Saint Louis Car Company—the same type of cars as the newest cars then in use on subway lines in the other boroughs. The R44s replaced the ME-1 rolling stock inherited from the B&O that had remained in continuous service since 1925 when the system was electrified.

During the 1970s, the MTA's ability to improve service on the line was hampered by several strikes by the SIRT's workers. From December 11, 1975, to April 1976, service on the SIRT was shut down because the line's 61 motormen and conductors went on strike. The strike ended once the MTA agreed to give them 14% wage increases.

In December 1976, SIRTOA recently completed projects to provide remote control of SIRT's electrical substations from the central one at St. George, and to install a two-way radio system. The former project improved the reliability of the system's power system, while the latter provided direct communication between the St. George control center and all trains, allowing information about the status of SIRT operations to be sent immediately to train staff and passengers on trains.

In December 1977, SIRTOA was preparing to begin construction on a pair of projects that would allow longer four-car trains to be run during rush hours regularly. New York City covered 25 percent of the cost of the projects, while New York State covered the remaining 75 percent. The first project was the construction of a new electrical substation capable of handling 4,000 kilowatts in Grant City, and the second was the expansion and modernization of the repair shop at Clifton Yard.

Work on the new Grant City substation building, which would cost $506,592, was expected to start in January 1978 and be completed by March 1979, while the installation of electrical equipment, which would cost $1.8 million, would begin in September 1978 and be completed in 1980. The project was the first in a series of improvement part of a long-term program to upgrade the SIRT's electrical supply and make it more reliable. In later phases, the new equipment installed in the new Grant City substation would also be installed in older substations on the line. In response to complaints from nearby residents, the design of the substation was modified to blend in with the character of the surrounding residential area, and would be constructed within the SIRT's open cut right-of-way. In addition, greenery and shrubs would be installed to beautify the structure's roof, which was located at street level. Work on the project was finally underway in April 1979, and was expected to be completed by the end of 1980.

The Clifton Yard project was planned to improve the maintenance of the SIRT's new fleet of R44 cars. This $3.9 million project, as of December 1977, was expected to begin in 1978 and be completed by the end of 1979. The project would extend and modernize the car maintenance shop, and construct new storage facilities, and a new two-story motor and wheel repair shop. The extension of the existing maintenance shop would allow the inspection pits to be rebuilt. These pits were designed to fit the ME-1 cars, which were 8 feet (2.4 m) shorter than the R44 cars. The improvements at the shop would increase the number of cars that could be overhauled and inspected daily by 50 percent. As of April 1979, work was expected to be completed by the middle of 1980.

On August 6, 1980, an MTA committee evaluated whether it should continue operating the rail line. On September 28, 1981, Assemblyman Robert Straniere announced that half of the $25 million allocated for capital improvements to the SIRT from bond use funds would be used for improved power distribution and the modernization of stations. Eleven stations would have their platforms extended, completing the extension of platforms along the line and two stations would have their wooden platforms replaced. In addition, equipment at four substations would be improved, new switches would be installed at Tottenville interlocking, and the wye track at St. George would be realigned to fit four-car trains, among other improvements. As part of the MTA's inaugural Capital Program from 1981, Pleasant Plains and Prince's Bay stations were rebuilt and the platforms at several other stations were lengthened.

On September 23, 1985, SIRTOA began work to repair structural problems at ten stations, including crumbling stairways. Temporary access paths, platforms and stairways were constructed to allow service to be maintained while work was underway.

On October 22, 1986, midday service was reduced in frequency from one train every 20 minutes to one every 30 minutes, due to a reduction in ferry service. Weekend service was reduced by 15 trains to 78 and weekday service was reduced by 15 to 109. In the following two years, ridership reduced from 6.47 million to 6.23 million.

=== Improvements in fare collection: 1985–1994 ===
Beginning on December 18, 1985, passengers traveling between 5:50 a.m. and 10 a.m. were required to pay their fares after they exit the train. People exiting at St. George were required to pay their fares by dropping a pre-purchased ticket in a box near twelve turnstiles, which were rearranged to reduce backups. Previously these turnstiles were only used for evening rush hours. At other stations, riders were to pay their fares as they exited station platforms. The change was made to reduce fare evasion. Despite the fact that ridership on the railroad increased 38 percent since 1977, revenue did not grow as conductors collecting tickets often could not get to all passengers in time due to crowding on trains. At the time, tickets could be purchased at Tottenville and St. George at all times, or from Grant City, New Dorp, Dongan Hills, Oakwood Heights, Eltingville and Great Kills between 6 a.m. and 2 p.m.

Tokens began to be accepted at St. George on April 20, 1988. A month later, tokens were used by 80 percent of riders. Tokens could be bought at vending machines between 6 a.m. and 10 a.m. at Huguenot, Annadale, Eltingville, Great Kills, Oakwood Heights, New Dorp, Grant City, and Dongan Hills, and at St. George at all times. On October 18, 1992, the NYCTA began distributing free transfers between the SIRT and bus routes on Staten Island.

On March 31, 1994, MetroCards began being accepted for fare payment at the St. George station, making it the 50th subway or Staten Island Railway station to accept it.

On May 13, 1997, New York City Transit announced it would eliminate on-board fare collection on July 4, meaning that fares would only be paid by riders who boarded or exited St. George, which was the only station with turnstiles. At the time, fares were collected on board by the conductor except on weekday trains arriving at St. George between 5:50 a.m. and 10:50 a.m.. Riders on those trains had to pay their fares upon exiting the station. Fares could be paid using MetroCards, tokens, special fare tickets, or transfers. Riders who alighted at other stations did not have to pay a fare during the morning rush hour.

The change, which was expected to cost $400,000, was part of the "One City, One Fare" fare cuts, would coincide with the elimination of the fare on the Staten Island Ferry, and the institution of free transfers between the railway and subways and buses in Manhattan. With the elimination of on-board fare collection, fares for trips between Tompkinsville and Tottenville would become free. A 1996 study had found that 2,370 of the 9,430 people who got off a St. George-bound train in the morning and 2,330 of the 10,430 people who boarded a Tottenville-bound evening train did so at a station other than St. George. Seven trainmen positions were expected to be affected by the elimination of the on-board collection of fares.

The changes took effect on July 4, 1997 as planned. The union representing the SIR's workers, United Transportation Union local 1440, was worried about the change, in part because of an expected rise in ridership. About 25 percent of riders would potentially get free rides with the change. The removal of fares was blamed for an immediate spike of crime along the line. Police officers and students said that disorderly conduct and fights by students took place more regularly. Crime increased over 200 percent between July and December 1997, compared to the same period in the prior year.

=== Rebranding and service improvements: 1990s ===
Ridership started to decrease in the early 1990s following the start of a series of major repair projects. Over nine years in the 1990s, all of the mainline track on the line was replaced. Though the third rail was supposed to be replaced, only a few hundred feet in Clifton and Tottenville yards were replaced by August 2003.

The MTA rebranded the Staten Island Rapid Transit as the MTA Staten Island Railway (SIR) on April 2, 1994; Staten Island Railway was the line's original name. This move followed the transfer of the Staten Island Rapid Transit from the New York City Transit Authority's Surface Transit Division to the Department of Rapid Transit on July 26, 1993.

On December 2, 1991, service on the SIRT changed from four-car trains to two-car trains between 9 p.m. and 5 a.m. to reduce track and car maintenance costs. In February 1992, it was estimated that the change led to reduced energy costs and a 13 percent reduction in car maintenance costs. This change was originally intended to go into effect by June 1988. In 1988, it was decided to transfer 12 R44 cars from the New York City Subway to the SIR in anticipation of expanding trains to five cars to accommodate an expected growth in ridership and to reduce overcrowding, which did not materialize. During the mid-2000s, some trains did run with five cars. The SIR timetable stated, "Select rush hour trains operate with additional cars. For a more comfortable ride, please use all available cars." Platforms at 18 stations were lengthened to accommodate five-car trains in 1988.

In 1993, a report by the Federal Transit Administration (FTA) criticized the MTA for not installing an automatic speed control (ASC) system on the railway to prevent collisions and overspeed violations. The agency had initially planned on installing a new signaling system on the line in the mid-1980s, but it was dropped from the capital program. The 1992-1996 program allocated $75 million for upgrades to the signal system with ASC, with funds allocated for work in 1996 and 1998. The FTA report also found that train cars did not have speedometers in them; they were added by February 1996.

In 1993, the Dongan Hills station became accessible under the Americans with Disabilities Act of 1990. In April 1996, a $6.7 million projects to repair the St. George, Tompkinsville, Stapleton, New Dorp, Richmond Valley, and Tottenville was scheduled for 1997. In 1998, those renovations were completed.

In November 1996, the results of the Staten Island Transit Needs Assessment Study, which was commissioned by New York City Transit, were made public. Recommendations related to the railway included operating shorter two-car trains instead of four-car trains to enable more frequent service, with not all trains timed to meet the ferry, better marketing for the railway, improved signs leading to train stations, consolidating the Nassau and Atlantic stations into an Arthur Kill station with a parking lot, adding a parking lot at Huguenot, creating a Grasmere transit center, where connections could be made with buses, and restarting service on the North Shore Branch. The study said that service could be restored for $108 million, and could have 17,200 riders a day in 2010. The study also recommended the addition of skip-stop service, the use of improved rolling stock which could accelerate more quickly and improvements in signaling.

On April 7, 1999, three additional afternoon express runs were added to the schedule, supplementing the four previously scheduled express trips. These trips skipped stops between St. George and Great Kills and then made all stops to Tottenville. The trips reduced travel times to Great Kills from 24 minutes to 15 minutes. The additional trips increased the span of express service from 5:11 to 6:02 p.m. to 4:50 to 6:31 p.m.. The existing four trips were used by about 2,280 passengers. The change in service was made in response to a request in August 1998 by Representative Vito Fossella Jr.

On June 24, 2001, a small section of the easternmost portion of the North Shore Branch (a few hundred feet) was reopened to provide passenger service to the new Richmond County Bank Ballpark, home of the Staten Island Yankees minor-league baseball team. The station cost $3.5 million to build. One train was scheduled to travel to/from Tottenville and two or three shuttle trains from St. George served the station. Trains last served the station in September 2009 and the service was discontinued as part of budget cuts on June 18, 2010, the day of the first scheduled home game for the Yankees. The elimination of this service saved $30,000 annually.

=== Consistent growth/Restoration and proposed bus line for the former North Shore Branch: 2000s and 2010s ===
In 2000, work began on a four-year project to upgrade the railway's signal system. Work was initially supposed to begin in 1998 and be completed by 2001. In August 2003, work was already over three years late.

In August 2003, it was reported that the SIR would overhaul three railroad bridges (Bay Street south of Clifton, and two crossings of Amboy Road) the following year for $7.2 million, which would require service to operate on a single track in sections. The repair work included replacing the tracks, installing a new waterproof seal over the deck, repairing floor beams, metal panels, drip pans, and girder encasements, and repainting the structures. These bridges were identified for repairs in a 2000 engineering survey. Work would begin following the completion of the signal project and was estimated to take about two years. The 2000 study stated that eight other bridges would need repairs. Those repairs were to take place between 2005 and 2009. An additional 16 bridges would need their waterproofing replaced, and two others had minor structural defects.

In 2004, the SIR put out its preliminary budget for 2005; it proposed several service cuts to offset an increased debt. For 2005, the agency proposed implementing One Person Train Operation, adding fare collection at Tompkinsville, reducing the fleet to 52 cars, eliminating express service, and reducing trains to two cars during off-peak hours. For 2006, it proposed eliminating weekend service from 2 a.m. Saturday to 5 a.m. Monday. Starting on May 1, 2005, SIR trains started running with two cars between 9 p.m. to 5 a.m. every night, stopping near station entrances to deter crime.

In December 2004, the completion on the signaling project was already 18 months late. A three-month phased cutover of the new signaling system was to begin in January 2005, starting from Tottenville and heading northwards. Starting January 21, 2005, the entire line would be closed every weeknight from 10 p.m. to 5 a.m. and all weekends until April.

In June 2005, a new cab signaling system and a new control center went into effect at St. George; the system is still in use as of February 2018 and has received minor upgrades. These improvements cost $100 million and helped enhance safety and increase operational flexibility. The new signal system provided improved signal visibility, continuous speed enforcement, and central monitoring at St. George, and the ability to remotely change switch positions; all switches on the main line were interlocked as part of the project. Previously, dispatchers could only track the position of trains using the signal system as they entered and left Tottenville and St. George.

The cab signaling system sounds an alarm inside the cab to control train speeds and automatically applies the brake if needed. Prior to the new system's implementation, there were no safeguards in place to prevent trains traveling at full speed after ignoring a signal and continuing past a bumping block. The new signal system required the installation of 30 miles (48 km) of underground fiber optic cable. The signals system limits the maximum speed at certain points and at sharp curves, and limits trains to 15 miles per hour (24 km/h) when approaching a terminal.

On July 17, 2006, rush-hour express service was sped up, with all morning express trains running non-stop from New Dorp to St. George. Evening express service started earlier under the new timetable. In response to record ridership growth on the SIR, rush-hour express service was expanded in late 2007. Evening service was expanded on November 14 when five additional express trains were added, expanding the span of express service by 80 minutes. Morning express service was expanded on December 5. The span of express service was extended by 45 minutes during the morning with the addition of three express trains. Express service was also added in the off-peak direction to Tottenville during the morning, with five express trips leaving St. George. Five local trains were also added to the schedule.

In May 2007, emergency call boxes and surveillance cameras were installed at Old Town to improve safety for riders waiting for trains. The cameras were linked by fiber optic cables to St. George station, where the footage was recorded. The $1.75 million project would install the systems at all stations by 2009, and was funded by former State Senator John Marchi and Councilman James Oddo. Work to consolidate the Nassau and Atlantic stations was expected to be completed in 2009 or 2010, and the R44 rolling stock was to be rehabilitated in 2008 before being replaced in 2014.

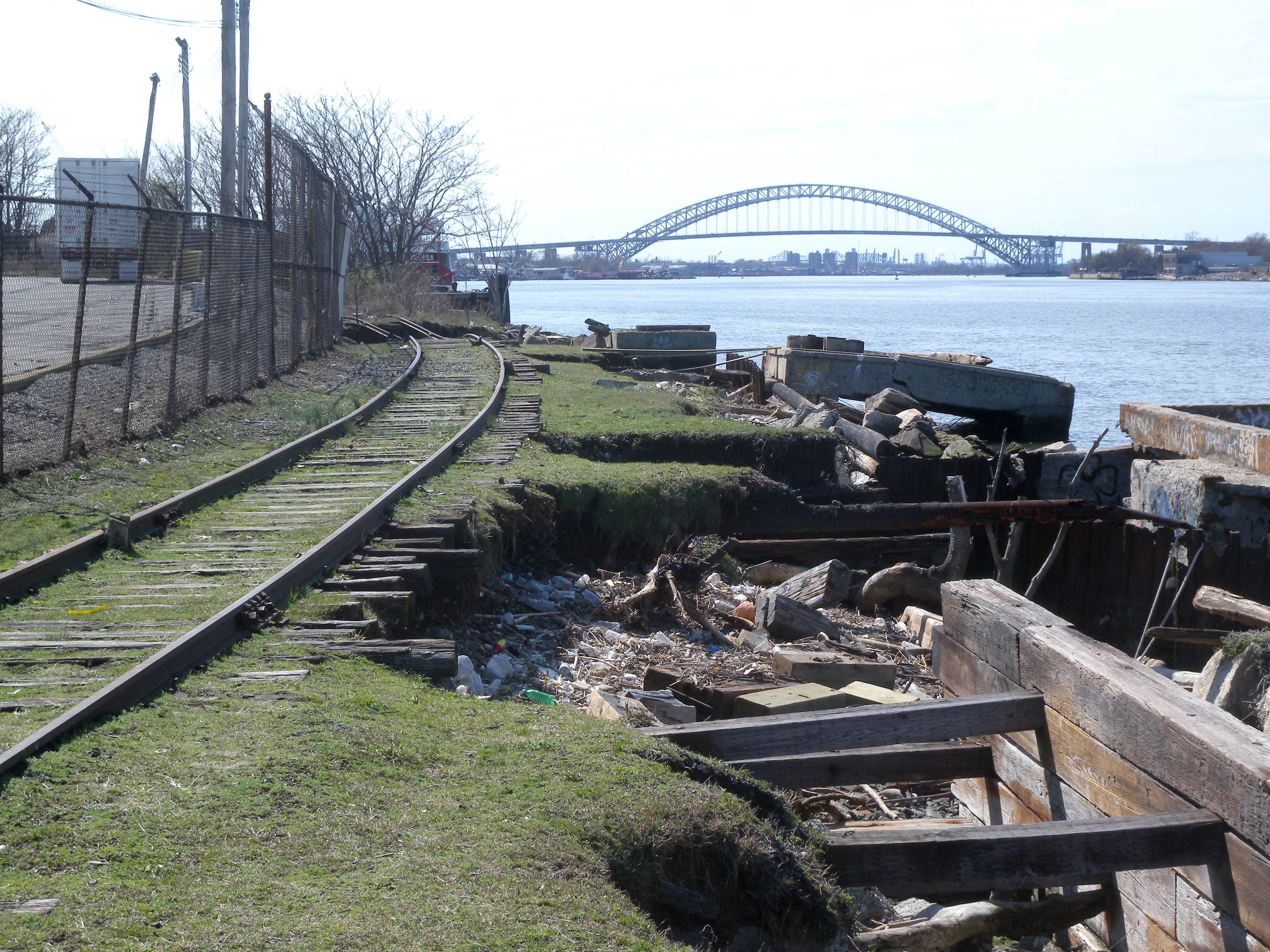
The right-of-way for the North Shore Branch still exists, but some portions of, such as the areas along the Kill van Kull, which can be seen in this picture, need extensive work to be done for it to be reactivated for heavy rail, light rail, or bus use.

A new stationhouse at Tompkinsville opened on January 20, 2010, with turnstiles installed for the first time. The stationhouse cost $6.9 million, and was equipped with low turnstiles and fare vending machines. The turnstiles were installed because passengers often avoided paying the fare by exiting at Tompkinsville and taking a short, 0.5-mile (800 m) walk to the St. George Ferry Terminal. It was estimated the SIR lost $3.4 million every year as a result. Trains heading to St. George during the morning rush hour, and trains leaving St. George in the evening rush hour had skipped Tompkinsville and Stapleton in an effort to reduce fare evasion. Service stopped at these stations every hour while all other rush hour trains bypassed them. After the installation of the turnstiles, the revenue generated at Tompkinsville made up 15% of the SIR's revenue. Schedules were changed, with locals and most non-rush hour trains stopping. In 2010, it was announced the MTA planned to restore fare collection on the entire line to raise more revenue and reduce crime. This was planned to be implemented once the MetroCard was replaced with a smartcard. In the interim, the MTA proposed installing turnstiles at Grasmere because it is a heavily used transfer point to the S53 bus to Brooklyn.

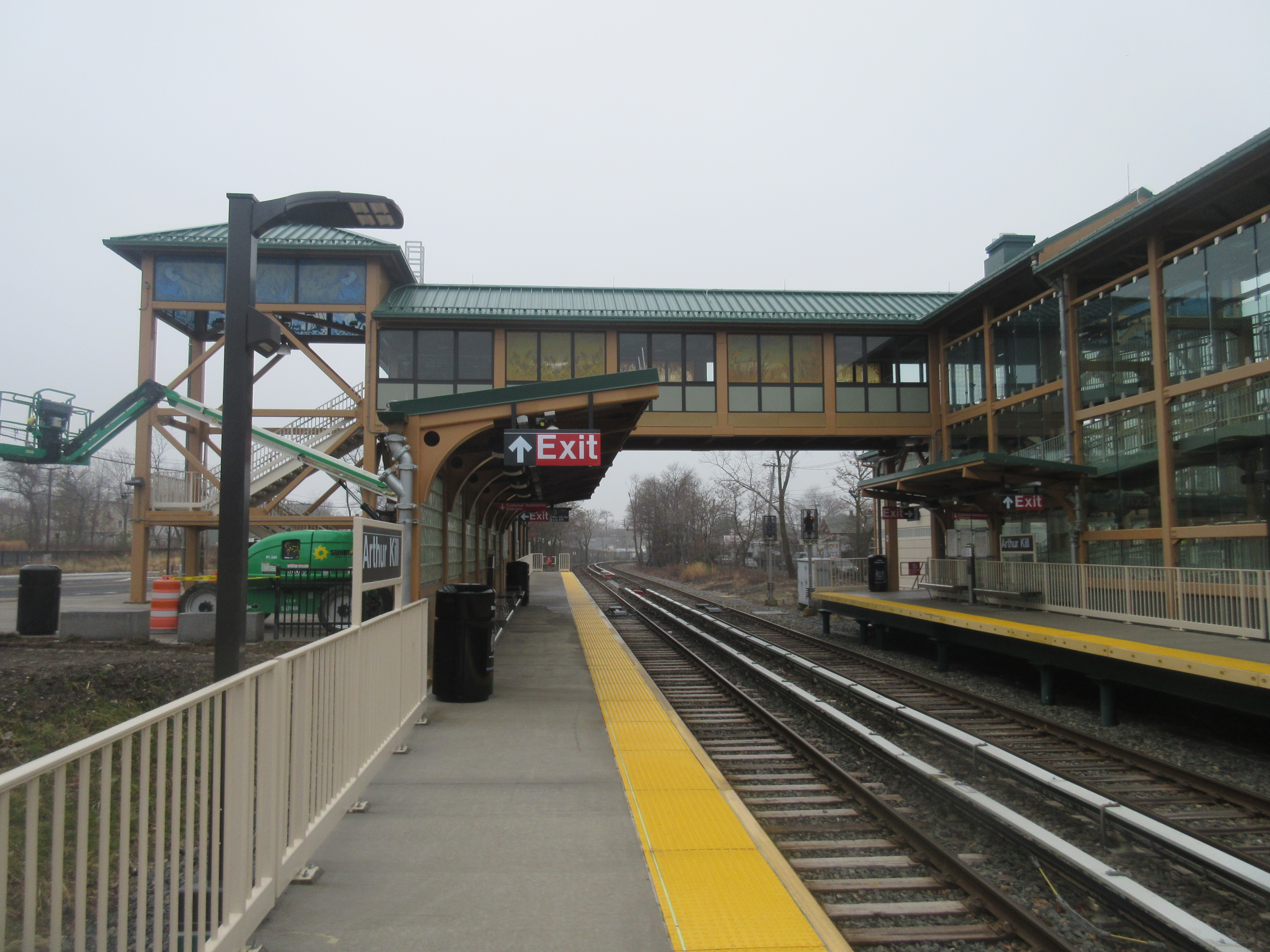
The Arthur Kill station opened in January 2017, replacing the Nassau and Atlantic stations. It was the first new station to open on the railway since the 1930s.

In a 2006 report, the Staten Island Advance explored the restoration of passenger services on 5.1-mile (8.2 km) of the North Shore Branch between St. George Ferry Terminal and Arlington station. Completion of the study is necessary to qualify the project for the estimated $360 million. A preliminary study found ridership could reach 15,000 daily. U.S. Senator Chuck Schumer from New York requested $4 million of federal funding for a detailed feasibility study. In 2012, the MTA released an analysis of transportation solutions for the North Shore, which included proposals for the reintroduction of heavy rail, light rail, or bus rapid transit using the North Shore line's right-of-way. Other options included transportation systems management, which would improve existing bus service, and the possibility of future ferry and water taxi services. Bus rapid transit was preferred for its cost and relative ease of implementation, which would require $352 million in capital investment. As of January 2018, the project has yet to receive funding.

On May 21, 2012, Grasmere station started to be rehabilitated. The construction included demolition and rebuilding of the station platform and station house. A temporary platform and entrance were built north of the main station. Construction was finished in April 2014.

A new, ADA-compliant station named Arthur Kill, near the southern terminus of the present line, opened on January 21, 2017, after numerous delays. The station is sited between Atlantic and Nassau stations, which it replaced. Atlantic and Nassau were in the poorest condition of all the stations on the line. Unlike the Atlantic and Nassau stations, Arthur Kill is able to platform a four-car train. The MTA has provided parking for 150 automobiles near the station. Ground was broken for the $15.3 million station on October 18, 2013. The contract for the project was awarded on July 31, 2013. The building of a station at Rosebank, which would bridge the gap between Grasmere and Clifton stations—the longest gap between stations on the line—has also been discussed. A Rosebank station once existed on the now-defunct South Beach Branch of the railway.

The 2015–2019 MTA Capital Plan called for the SIR's Richmond Valley station and 32 subway stations to undergo a complete overhaul as part of the Enhanced Station Initiative. Updates would include the addition of cellular service, Wi-Fi, USB charging stations, interactive service advisories and maps, improved signage, and improved station lighting. The capital plan also called for the reconstruction of the Clifton Yard, which had been damaged during Hurricane Sandy in 2012, as well as the addition of storm walls at St. George. The St. George flood walls were finished in mid-2017, while the Clifton Yard reconstruction was to be completed in 2021. In 2022, the MTA awarded a contract to install seven 150-foot (46 m) monopole antennas to replace the SIR's existing radio system.

=== Decline and the rebirth of freight: 1971–present ===
==== Decline: 1971–2000 ====
Through a merger with the Chesapeake and Ohio Railway, the B&O became part of the larger Chessie System. The freight operation on the island was renamed the Staten Island Railroad Corporation (SIRC) in 1971, after being separated from the island's passenger service. In 1976, when the CNJ was absorbed into the federal government-controlled Conrail, the Chessie System became isolated from their properties in New Jersey and Staten Island. Most of their freight service, with the exception of one daily train to Cranford Junction, was truncated to Philadelphia. By 1973, the car ferry yard at Jersey City operated by the CNJ had shut down. Afterward, the car ferry operation at Saint George Yard was reopened; the New York Dock Railway took over the operation in September 1979, but closed it the following year.

Only a few isolated industries on Staten Island continued to rely on rail service for freight, effectively abandoning the Saint George Yard. On April 24, 1985, following a major decline in freight traffic, the Chessie System sold the SIRC to the New York, Susquehanna and Western Railway (NYS&W), a subsidiary of the Delaware Otsego Corporation (DO), for $1.5 million via a promissory note payable for ten years. The NYS&W began to serve the SIRC's ten remaining customers with the hopes of hiring more, and only five employees became assigned to the SIRC's operations. In October 1989, the NYS&W embargoed 4 miles (6,400 m) of trackage east of Elm Park on the North Shore Branch, ending rail freight traffic to Saint George. In 1990, the SIRC's primary customer, Procter & Gamble, closed, resulting in a further decline in freight traffic.

The Arthur Kill Vertical Lift Bridge was removed from service on June 25, 1991, and the SIRC's final train under NYS&W ownership subsequently operated on April 21, 1992. Afterwards, the North Shore Branch and the Arthur Kill Bridge were obtained by the Chessie's successor, CSX. In 1994, the railway and bridge were sold again to the New York City Economic Development Corporation (NYCEDC), whose purchase was followed by a decade of false starts. In 1998, Conrail was split up, and some portions of trackage formerly operated by the B&O's competitors were acquired by CSX. The railroad line from Cranford Junction to Arlington was still intact, by that time.

==== Reactivation of freight/Renovations: 2000–present ====
During the early 2000s, the Port Authority of New York and New Jersey announced plans to reopen the Staten Island Railroad line in New Jersey. Since the Jersey Central became a New Jersey Transit line, a new junction would be built to the ex-Lehigh Valley Railroad line. Two rail tunnels from Brooklyn were planned—one to Staten Island and one to Greenville, New Jersey—and would allow freight to pass through New York on its way from New England to the South. In December 2004, a $72 million project to reactivate freight service on Staten Island and to repair the Arthur Kill Vertical Lift Bridge was announced by the NYCEDC and the Port Authority. Specific projects on the Arthur Kill Vertical Lift Bridge included repainting the steel superstructure and rehabilitating the lift mechanism. In June 2006, the freight line connection from New Jersey to the Staten Island Railroad was completed, and became operated in part by the Morristown and Erie Railway under contract with other companies and New Jersey.

The Arthur Kill Vertical Lift Bridge was renovated in 2006 and began regular service on April 2, 2007; 16 years after it was closed. As part of the project, a portion of the North Shore Branch was rehabilitated, the Arlington Yard was expanded, and 6,500 feet (1,981 m) of new track was laid along the Travis Branch to Fresh Kills. Soon after service restarted on the line, Mayor Michael Bloomberg officially commemorated the reactivation on April 17, 2007. Service was provided by CSX Transportation, Norfolk Southern Railway, and Conrail over the Travis Branch to haul waste from the Staten Island Transfer Station at Fresh Kills and ship container freight from the Howland Hook Marine Terminal and other industrial businesses. Along the remainder of the North Shore Branch, there are still tracks and rail overpasses in some places.
