= Bachmann (disambiguation) =

Bachmann is a surname of Switzerland and Germany.

Bachmann may also refer to:

- Bachmann (Staten Island Railway station)
- "Bachmann" (short story), a short story by Vladimir Nabokov
- Bachmann Industries, a model railroading company
- Bachmann's Brewery, Staten Island, New York
- Bachmann knot, a type of friction hitch, which is a kind of knot used to attach one rope to another in a way that is easily adjusted
