= Bachmann's Brewery =

Brewery in Staten Island, New York

The Mayer Bachmann Brewery (1851–1881) was the largest of a half-dozen breweries on Staten Island, New York, before its destruction by fire. After rebuilding, it operated as the Bachmann Brewery and then the Bachmann Bechtel Brewery until 1919.

The brewery occupied the block bounded by Forest (now Ditson), Maple (now Lynhurst), Willow, and Tompkins Avenues in the village of Clifton. Constructed in 1851, it was the first lager beer factory on Staten Island. Originally named the Clifton Brewery, it was financed in a joint venture between Antonio Meucci and Giuseppe Garibaldi. Comprising a number of brick buildings from three to four stories in height, it bordered railroad tracks between the Staten Island Railway main line and the former South Beach Branch. After it became the Bachmann Brewery, SIR built Bachmann Station in 1886 with wooden platforms solely for the convenience of brewery employees.

The Mayer Bachmann Brewery operated until October 31, 1881, when the factory was destroyed by fire. However, Frederick Bachmann rebuilt the Bachmann Brewery, without his partner Gabriel Mayer. (Mayer got the insurance money and Bachmann got the brewery.) The Bachmann Brewery was in full operation under Frederick Bachmann until his death on January 5, 1905. The Bachmann Brewery continued under this name until 1909 or 1910, when it merged with the Bechtel Brewery to become the Bachmann Bechtel Brewery, which continued until 1919, just before Prohibition. When the Bachmann Brewery was in its heyday, Frederick Bachmann had associated businesses, including beer gardens and hotels in a resort and convention area.

By 1937, the Bachmann train station stood in the shadow of the Chestnut Avenue overpass and the Lynhurst Avenue pedestrian overpass, both part of SIRT's program to eliminate grade crossings. Since the factory was no longer there and the Rosebank station was a mere tenth of a mile away, Bachmann station became redundant. Later that same year, it was abandoned and razed.
