= Cedar Avenue (disambiguation) =

Cedar Avenue is a street in Minneapolis.

Cedar Avenue may also refer to:

- Cedar Avenue of Nikkō, a tree-lined section of road in Nikko, Japan
- Cedar Avenue station, a former railway facility on Staten Island, New York

== See also ==
- Cedar Avenue Bridge (disambiguation)
