= Arrochar =

Arrochar can refer to:

- Arrochar, Argyll, Scotland
  - Arrochar and Tarbet railway station
  - Arrochar Alps, Argyll and Bute, a group of small mountains
- Arrochar, Staten Island, New York
  - Arrochar (Staten Island Railway station)
