= Belair Road station =

Staten Island Railway station (1886–1953)

Belair Road
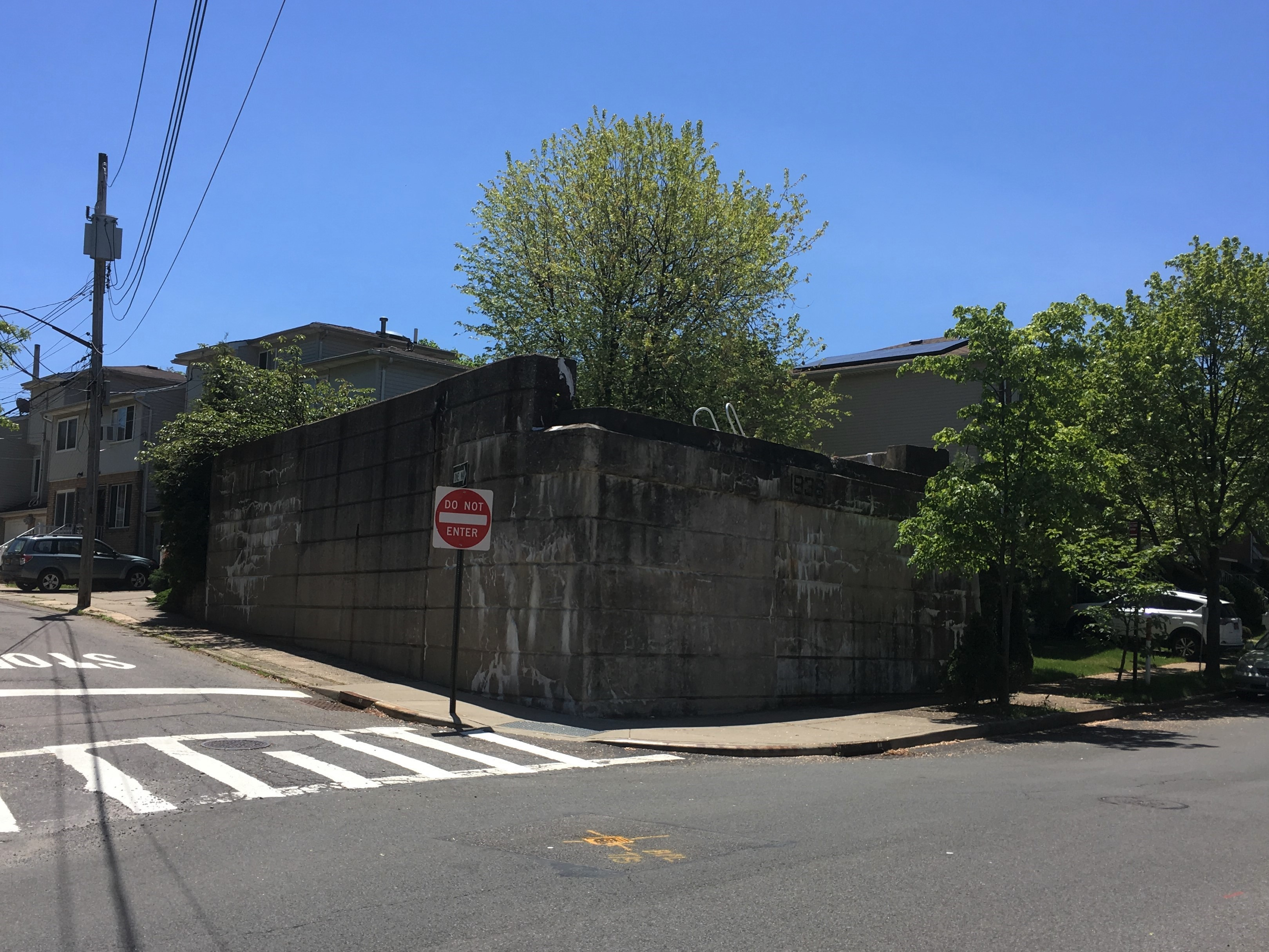
- Remnant of trestle support on St. Johns Avenue

General information
- Location: Staten Island
- Coordinates: 40.610278°N 74.067222°W
- Line: South Beach Branch
- Platforms: 2 side platforms
- Tracks: 2

History
- Opened: March 8, 1886; 140 years ago
- Closed: March 31, 1953; 73 years ago

Former services
Preceding station	Staten Island Railway	Following station
Rosebank toward Clifton	South Beach Branch	Fort Wadsworth toward Wentworth Avenue
Location

Belair Road is a demolished station on the abandoned South Beach Branch of the Staten Island Railway. It had two side platforms and two tracks, and was located at Vermont Avenue, between Belair Road & St. Johns Avenue. This station served the US Quarantine station, which was one block to the east.

The Belair Road station was built out of wood, and could only platform two cars. There was a shelter on one of the platforms. The station was rebuilt in 1936 with concrete. It was rebuilt with an underground access walkway on both sides of the station.

North of the station, there was a trestle built at Saint John's Avenue in 1936 to allow the road to pass over the right-of-way. Today, all that is left of the trestle is a stanchion that has been morphed into part of someone's backyard, with a pool on top.

This station was abandoned when the SIRT discontinued passenger service on the South Beach Branch to Wentworth Avenue at midnight on March 31, 1953 because of city-operated bus competition.
