= South Beach station =

Staten Island Railway station (1890–1953)

South Beach
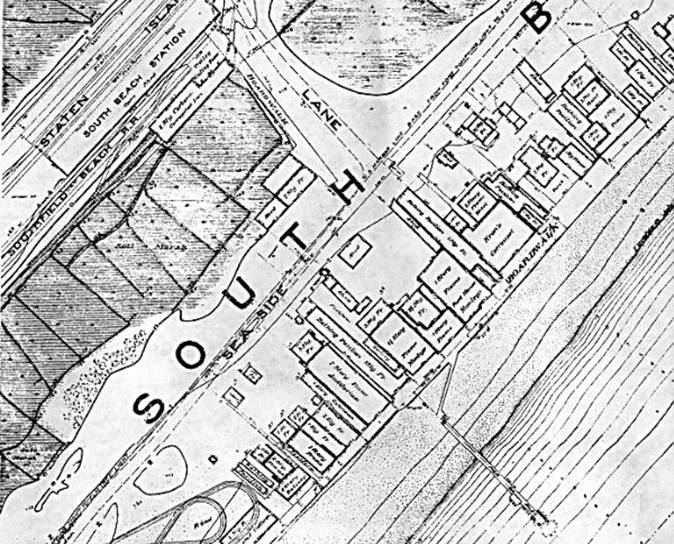
- 1907 Borough Hall survey South Beach

General information
- Location: South Beach, Staten Island
- Coordinates: 40.590972°N 74.067639°W
- Line: South Beach Branch
- Platforms: 2 side platforms
- Tracks: 2

History
- Opened: 1890; 136 years ago
- Closed: March 31, 1953; 73 years ago

Former services
Preceding station	Staten Island Railway	Following station
Cedar Avenue toward Clifton	South Beach Branch	Wentworth Avenue Terminus
Location

South Beach was a station on the demolished South Beach Branch of the Staten Island Railway. It had two tracks and two side platforms, and was located at Sand Lane and Oceanside Avenue.

This station was the last stop on the South Beach Branch until the opening of the Wentworth Avenue station in 1925, when the South Beach Branch was electrified. The ticket agent at South Beach controlled the lights for Wentworth Avenue. This station was abandoned when the SIRT discontinued passenger service on the entire South Beach Branch at midnight on March 31, 1953, because of city-operated bus competition.
