= Cedar Avenue Bridge =

Cedar Avenue Bridge may refer to:

- 10th Avenue Bridge (formerly called the Cedar Avenue Bridge), crossing the Mississippi River in Minneapolis, Minnesota
- Cedar Avenue Bridge (Minnesota River), carrying Minnesota State Highway 77 over the Minnesota River between Bloomington and Eagan, Minnesota

== See also ==
- Cedar Avenue (disambiguation)
