= Fort Wadsworth station =

Staten Island Railway station (1886–1953)

Fort Wadsworth
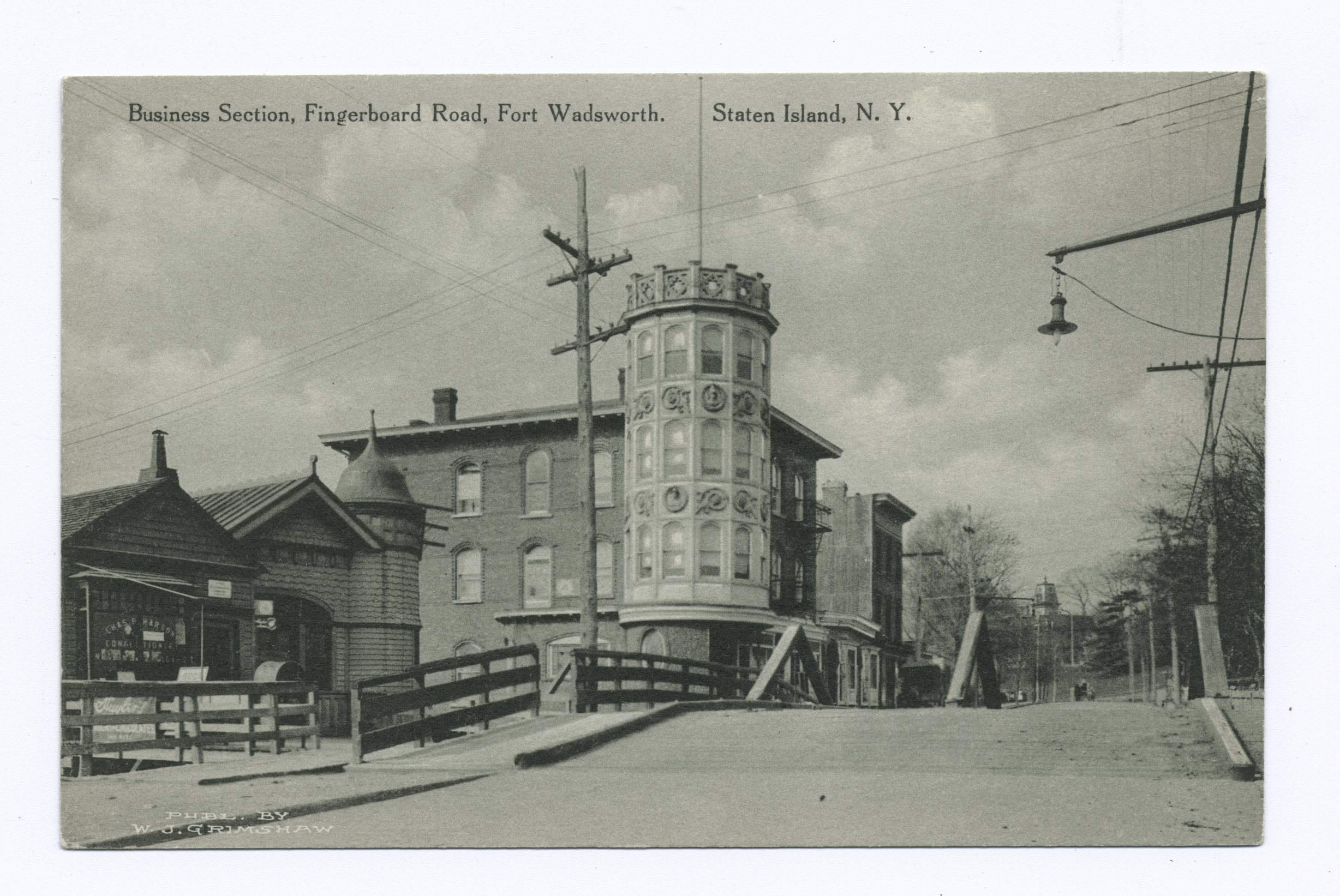

General information
- Location: Staten Island
- Coordinates: 40.606972°N 74.066472°W
- Line: South Beach Branch
- Platforms: 2 side platforms
- Tracks: 2

History
- Opened: March 8, 1886; 140 years ago
- Closed: March 31, 1953; 73 years ago

Former services
Preceding station	Staten Island Railway	Following station
Belair Road toward Clifton	South Beach Branch	Arrochar toward Wentworth Avenue
Location

Fort Wadsworth was a station on the demolished South Beach Branch of the Staten Island Railway, near the historic Fort Wadsworth. It had two side platforms and two tracks, and was located at Fingerboard Road.

This station was abandoned when the SIRT discontinued passenger service on the South Beach Branch to Wentworth Avenue at midnight on March 31, 1953, because of city-operated bus competition.

The unused station, overgrown with weeds, remained in place until the 1970s. The location where the station and tracks previously existed, at what is currently the intersection of Tompkins Avenue and Lyman Avenue in Rosebank/Fort Wadsworth, is now occupied by a collection of town homes that are noticeably newer than the surrounding residences. The path of the former track leading to South Beach, at a lower grade, is now occupied by a power substation.
