= Rosebank station =

Staten Island Railway station (1886–1953)

Rosebank
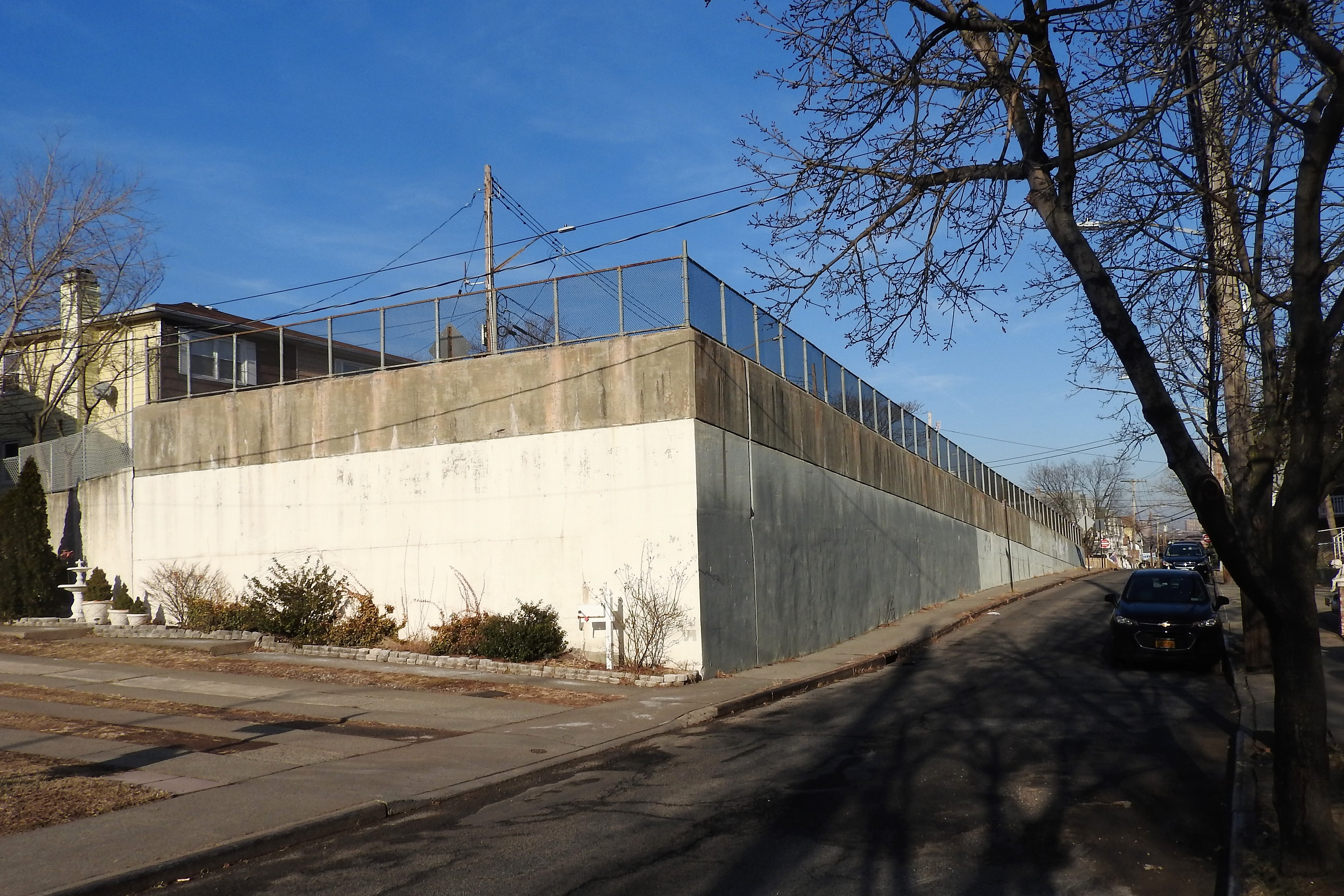
- Approximate site of former Rosebank station, with ramp for former bridge across former track

General information
- Location: Rosebank, Staten Island
- Coordinates: 40.614639°N 74.070278°W
- Line: South Beach Branch
- Platforms: 2 side platforms
- Tracks: 2

History
- Opened: March 8, 1886; 140 years ago
- Closed: March 31, 1953; 73 years ago

Former services
Preceding station	Staten Island Railway	Following station
Bachmann toward Clifton	South Beach Branch	Belair Road toward Wentworth Avenue
Location

Rosebank is a demolished station in the Rosebank neighborhood along the abandoned South Beach Branch of the Staten Island Railway. It had two tracks and two side platforms, and was located along Tilson Place between Virginia Avenue and St. Mary's Avenue.

== History ==
As part of a grade crossing elimination project on the South Beach Branch, the grade crossing at St. Mary's Avenue was eliminated, and the station was rebuilt in the fall of 1937. This structure remained in place until well after the branch's abandonment in 1953. There was an overpass at the new station connecting the two platforms. At Clifton Avenue, there was a pedestrian underpass which ran underground beneath the tracks that was built in 1937. This underpass was frequently used by students from Public School 13. The two buildings of P.S. 13 were later on replaced with one building, which stands on the South Beach Branch right-of-way.

This station was abandoned when the SIRT discontinued passenger service on the South Beach Branch to Wentworth Avenue at midnight on March 31, 1953 because of city-operated bus competition.

Previously, south of the station at Hylan Boulevard, there was an overpass, that has been filled in since the line was abandoned. The Virginia Avenue trestle was demolished in 1999.

There is also discussion of building a station nearby on the SIR Main Line which would bridge the longest gap between two stations (Grasmere and Clifton). This proposed station could be named Rosebank.
