= Bachmann station =

Staten Island Railway station (1886–1937)

Bachmann

General information
- Location: Staten Island
- Coordinates: 40.616667°N 74.071667°W
- Line: South Beach Branch
- Platforms: 2 side platforms
- Tracks: 2

History
- Opened: March 8, 1886; 140 years ago
- Closed: 1937; 89 years ago

Former services
Preceding station	Staten Island Railway	Following station
Clifton Terminus	South Beach Branch	Rosebank toward Wentworth Avenue
Location

Bachmann was a station on the demolished South Beach Branch of the Staten Island Railway. Constructed in 1886 to serve the employees of Bachmann's Brewery, it had two tracks and two side platforms, and was located east of Tompkins Avenue, between Lynhurst and Chestnut Avenues. During a grade crossing elimination project on the South Beach Branch, the railroad closed and razed the stop in 1937, due to its proximity to the Rosebank station and the fact that the brewery never reopened after Prohibition. Well after the closure of the Bachmann station, the rest of the South Beach Branch was abandoned in 1953, because of city-operated bus competition.
