= Arrochar station =

Staten Island Railway station (1886–1953)

Arrochar

General information
- Location: Arrochar, Staten Island
- Coordinates: 40.599722°N 74.066528°W
- Line: South Beach Branch
- Platforms: 2 side platforms
- Tracks: 2

History
- Opened: March 8, 1886; 140 years ago
- Closed: March 31, 1953; 73 years ago

Former services
Preceding station	Staten Island Railway	Following station
Fort Wadsworth toward Clifton	South Beach Branch	Cedar Avenue toward Wentworth Avenue
Location

Arrochar was a station on the demolished South Beach Branch of the Staten Island Railway. It had two side platforms and two tracks and was located at Major Avenue. The station was able to platform two train cars.

== History ==
This station was abandoned when the SIRT discontinued passenger service on the South Beach Branch to Wentworth Avenue at midnight on March 31, 1953, because of city-operated bus competition. The station was fully demolished when the toll plaza of the Verrazzano–Narrows Bridge was built near the same location. Only one staircase that led to the station remained by 1963, as the rest of the station was covered by displaced dirt coming from the construction of the approach to the Verrazzano Bridge. The location where McClean Avenue used to bridge over the right-of-way, which was built in 1936, has been filled in some time after 1964 for the construction of houses along the right-of-way, and the bridge can still be detected by the cement in the middle of McClean Avenue.
