= Cedar Avenue station =

Staten Island Railway station (1931–53)

Cedar Avenue

General information
- Location: Staten Island
- Coordinates: 40.596583°N 74.065639°W
- Line: South Beach Branch
- Platforms: 2 side platforms
- Tracks: 2

History
- Opened: 1931; 95 years ago
- Closed: March 31, 1953; 73 years ago

Former services
Preceding station	Staten Island Railway	Following station
Arrochar toward Clifton	South Beach Branch	South Beach toward Wentworth Avenue
Location

Cedar Avenue was a station on the demolished South Beach Branch of the Staten Island Railway. It had two tracks and two side platforms and was located at Cedar Avenue and Railroad Avenue. It opened in 1931, and closed in 1953.

== History ==
In 1931, the station opened with the construction of wooden platforms at the Cedar Avenue grade crossing on the South Beach Branch. The following year, a shelter was added on the westbound platform.

This station was abandoned when the SIRT discontinued passenger service on the South Beach Branch to South Beach at midnight on March 31, 1953 because of city-operated bus competition. The platforms continued to remain on this location into the 1960s.

South of this station is the Robin Road Trestle, which is the only remaining intact trestle along the South Beach Line. In the early 2000s, developers purchased the property on either side of the trestle's abutments, but the developers, the New York City Department of Transportation, and the New York City Transit Authority all claimed ownership of it. Consequently, townhouses have built up against both sides of it.
