= Stapleton station =

Staten Island Railway station

Stapleton
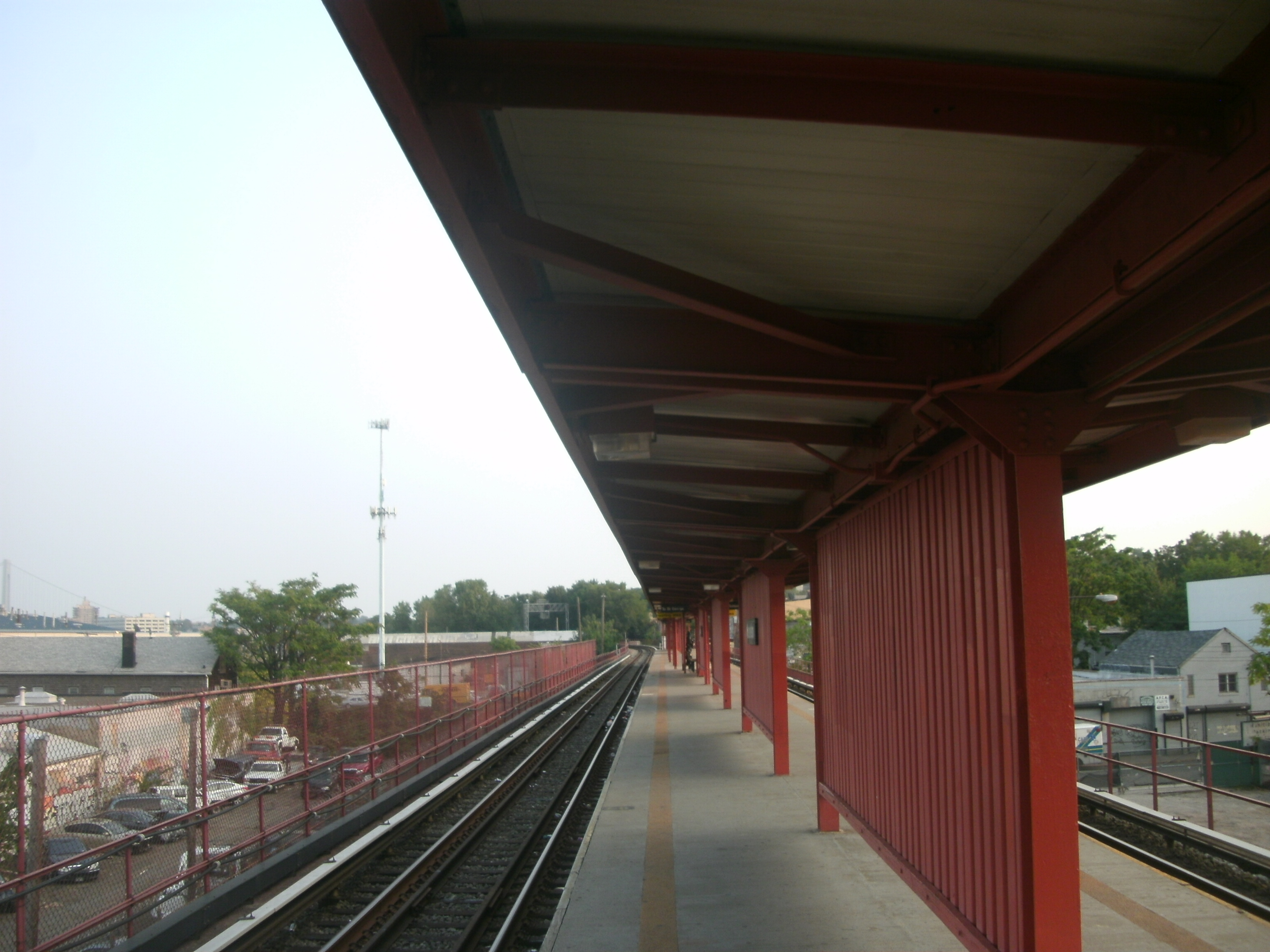
- Station platform

General information
- Location: Bay Street and Prospect Street; Stapleton, Staten Island
- Coordinates: 40.627889°N 74.075139°W
- Platforms: 1 island platform
- Tracks: 2
- Connections: NYCT Bus: S51, S52, S74, S76, S78, S81, S84, S86

Construction
- Structure type: Elevated

Other information
- Station code: 503

History
- Opened: July 31, 1884; 142 years ago
- Rebuilt: 1936

Services
Preceding station	Staten Island Railway	Following station
Tompkinsville toward St. George	Staten Island Railway	Clifton toward Tottenville
Track layout
Location

The Stapleton station is an elevated Staten Island Railway station in the neighborhood of Stapleton, Staten Island, New York, located at Bay Street and Prospect Street on the main line.

== History ==
This station opened on July 31, 1884, with the extension of the SIRT from Vanderbilt's Landing to Tompkinsville. Stapleton was rehabilitated in 1936 as part of a grade crossing elimination project.

== Station layout ==
P Platform level	Southbound	← toward Tottenville (Clifton) ← rush hour express does not stop here
P Platform level	Island platform
P Platform level	Northbound	toward St. George (Tompkinsville) → AM rush express does not stop here →
G	Street level	Exit/entrance

The station has an island platform and two tracks. South of the station, tracks diverge from the line on the Saint George-bound side to the Clifton Yard. This is where the railway cars are moved from the Staten Island Railway by truck to get work done at the Coney Island Shops.

=== Exits ===
The north end has an exit to Prospect Street and a New York City Department of Transportation Park and Ride facility to the west side of the right-of-way (next to Bay Street). The south end exits to Water Street and Bay Street.
