= South Beach Branch =

Former railroad branch in Staten Island, New York

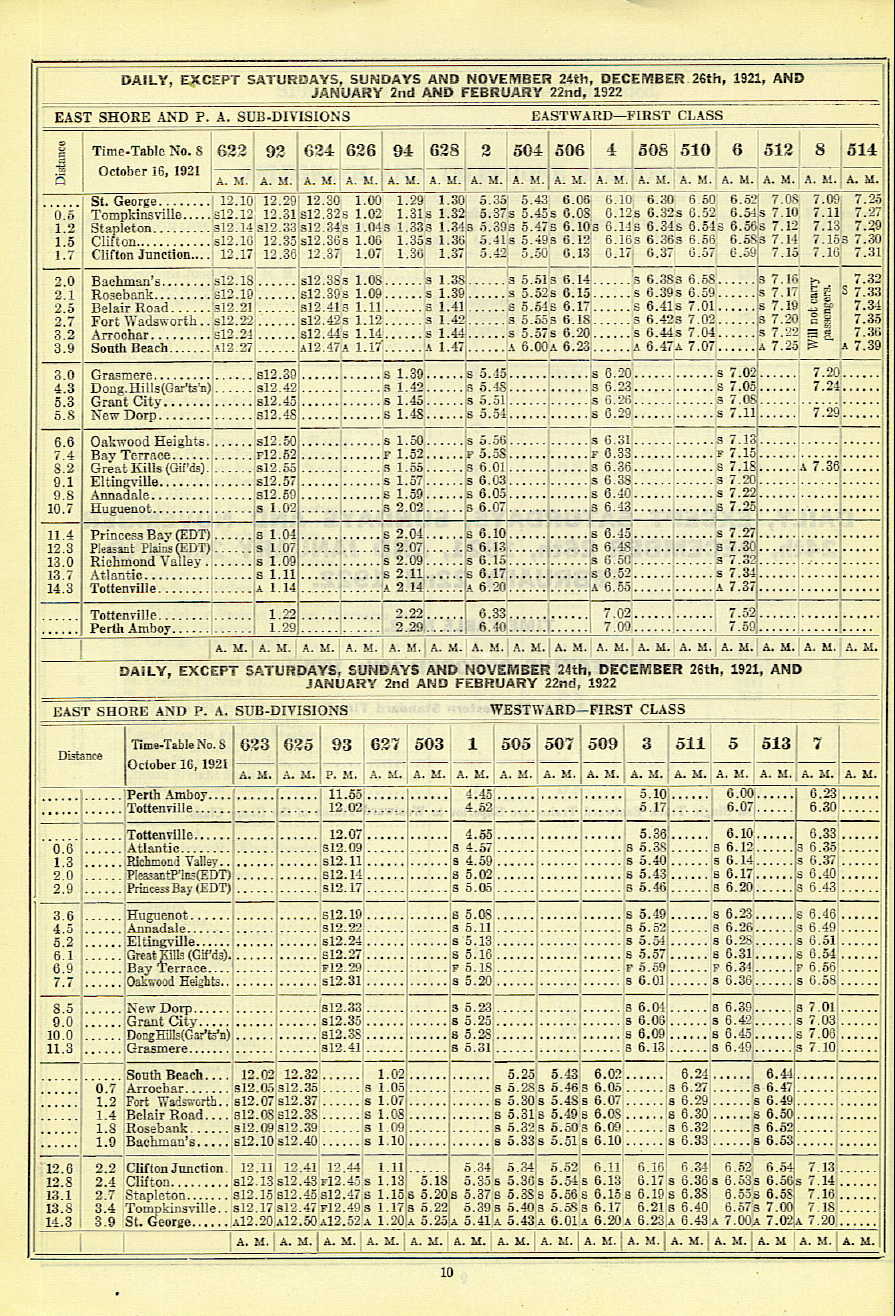
- SIRT Employee Timetable 1921–1922 East Shore and Perth Amboy Sub-Divisions

Overview
- Status: Abandoned
- Owner: Baltimore and Ohio Railroad
- Locale: Staten Island, New York, U.S.
- Termini: Clifton; Wentworth Avenue
- Stations: 8

Service
- Type: Rapid transit
- System: Staten Island Railway
- Operator(s): Staten Island Railway

History
- Opened: January 1, 1888
- Closed: March 31, 1953

Technical
- Line length: 4.1 miles (6.6 km)
- Number of tracks: 2
- Track gauge: 4 ft 8 1/2 in (1,435 mm)
- Electrification: 1925

The South Beach Branch, also called the East Shore Sub-Division, is an abandoned branch of the Staten Island Railway in New York City, which operated along Staten Island's East Shore from Clifton to Wentworth Avenue. This 4.1-mile (6.6 km) double-tracked branch left the Main Line at 40°37′08″N 74°04′18″W, south of the Clifton station, and lay to the east of the Main Line. Rapid transit service on the South Beach Branch and the North Shore Branch ended on March 31, 1953.

== History ==
The East Shore branch opened on January 1, 1888, to Arrochar, and was extended to South Beach sometime after September 1888, when it was proposed to extend the line.

Trains on the branch typically consisted of one or two cars. In 1925, the branch was extended one stop to Wentworth Avenue, with a platform just long enough to accommodate one door of a single car.

The first electric train was operated on the South Beach Branch between South Beach and Fort Wadsworth at 9:45 P. M. on May 30, 1925. This sub-division was put into regular operation at 12:01 A.M. June 5, 1925.

In 1936–1937, the branch was elevated to remove several grade crossings.

The fares on the branch were collected by the conductor on the train, who had to pull a cord, similar to how it was done with trolleys. The Baltimore & Ohio Railroad, which owned the branch and eventually wanted to abandon the unprofitable service, purposely looked the other way when conductors skimmed something off the top. This allowed B&O to show a lower ridership to the Interstate Commerce Commission, thereby encouraging the abandonment of the branch.

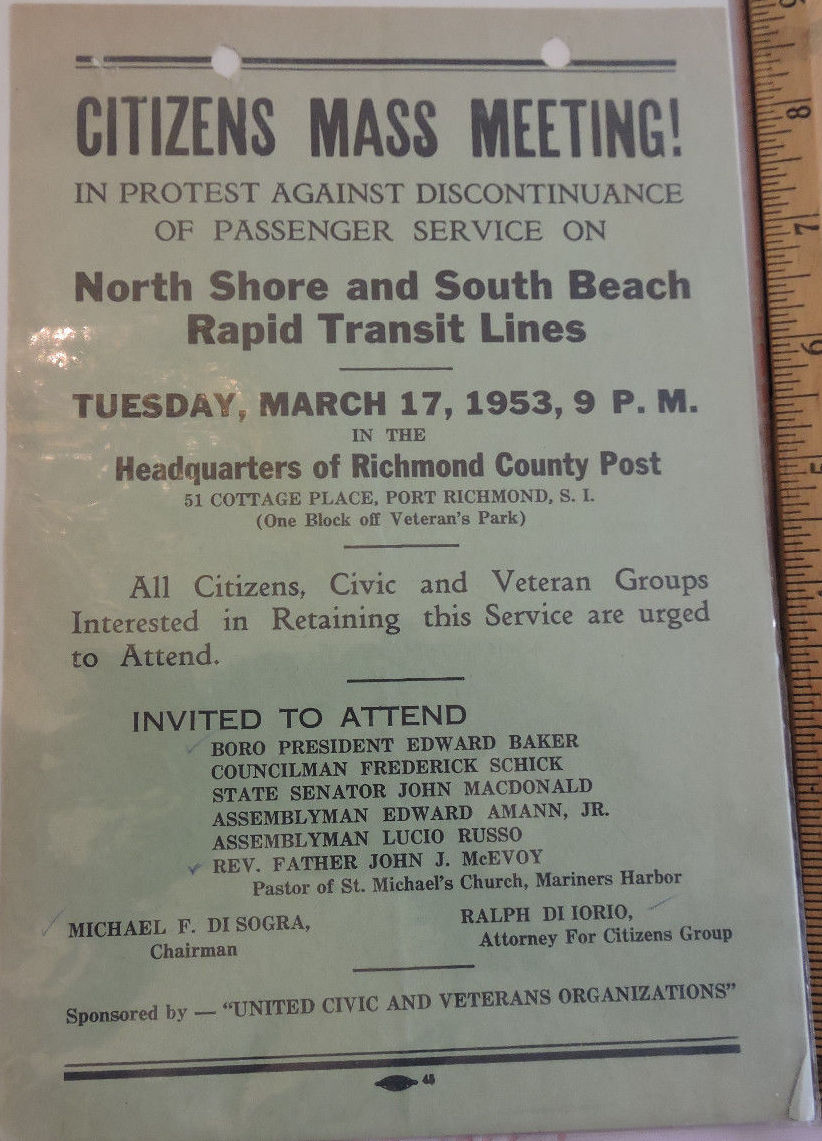

The New York City Board of Transportation gained almost complete control of the island’s bus lines in 1948 and cut fares to match the other city lines. The railroad could not match the fare cut and lost 60% of its business almost immediately. The railroad announced plans to terminate all passenger operations in 1953 but a threat from the city to relieve them of their still-profitable freight service along with a commitment for a sizeable city subsidy preserved the Main Line to Tottenville. The short South Beach and North Shore branches were agreed to be no longer viable and passenger service was terminated on both lines March 31, 1953. The South Beach branch was abandoned shortly thereafter while the North Shore Branch continued to carry freight. On both lines, the third rail was removed by 1955.

=== Remnants ===
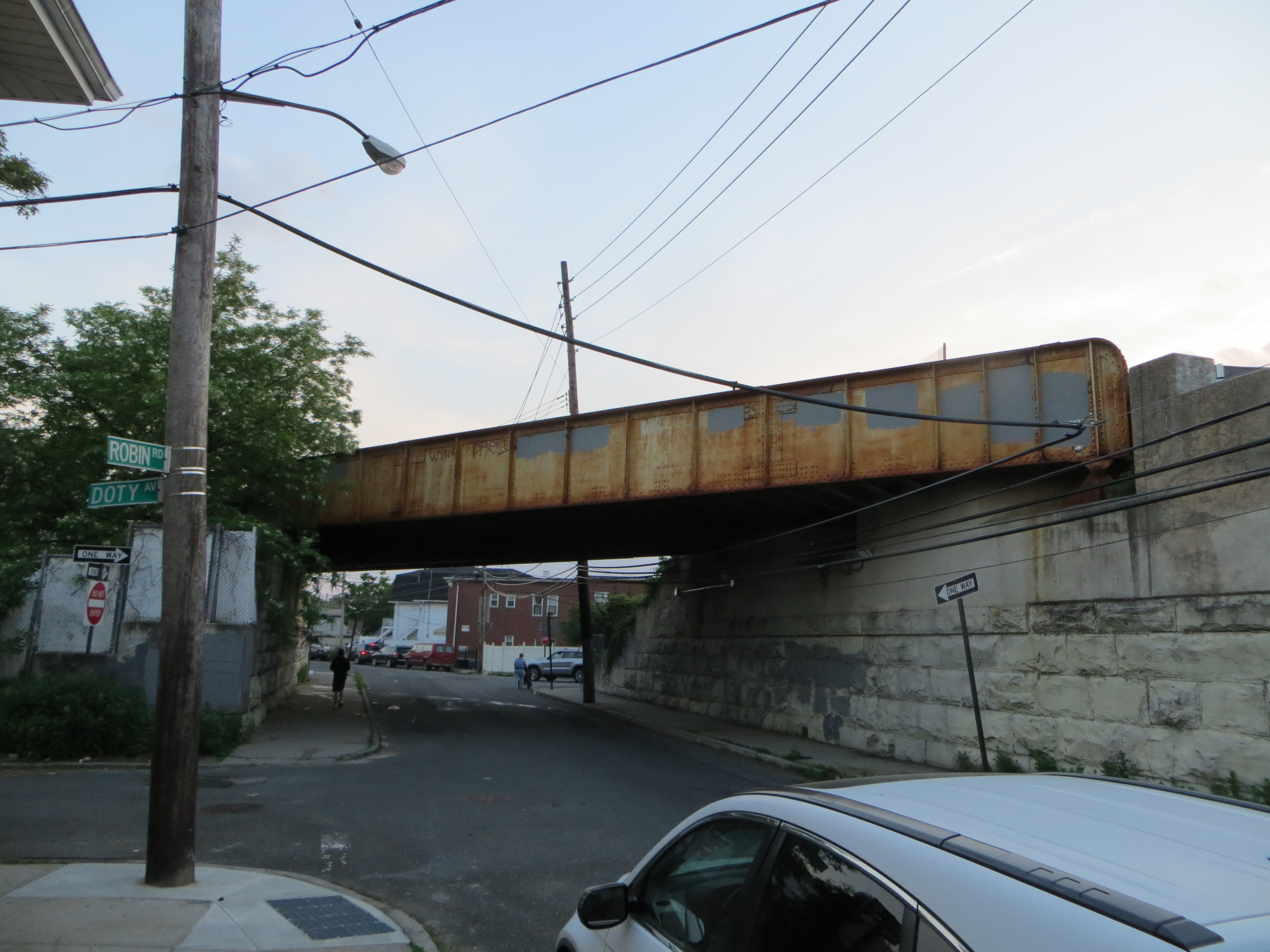
Bridge over Robin Road

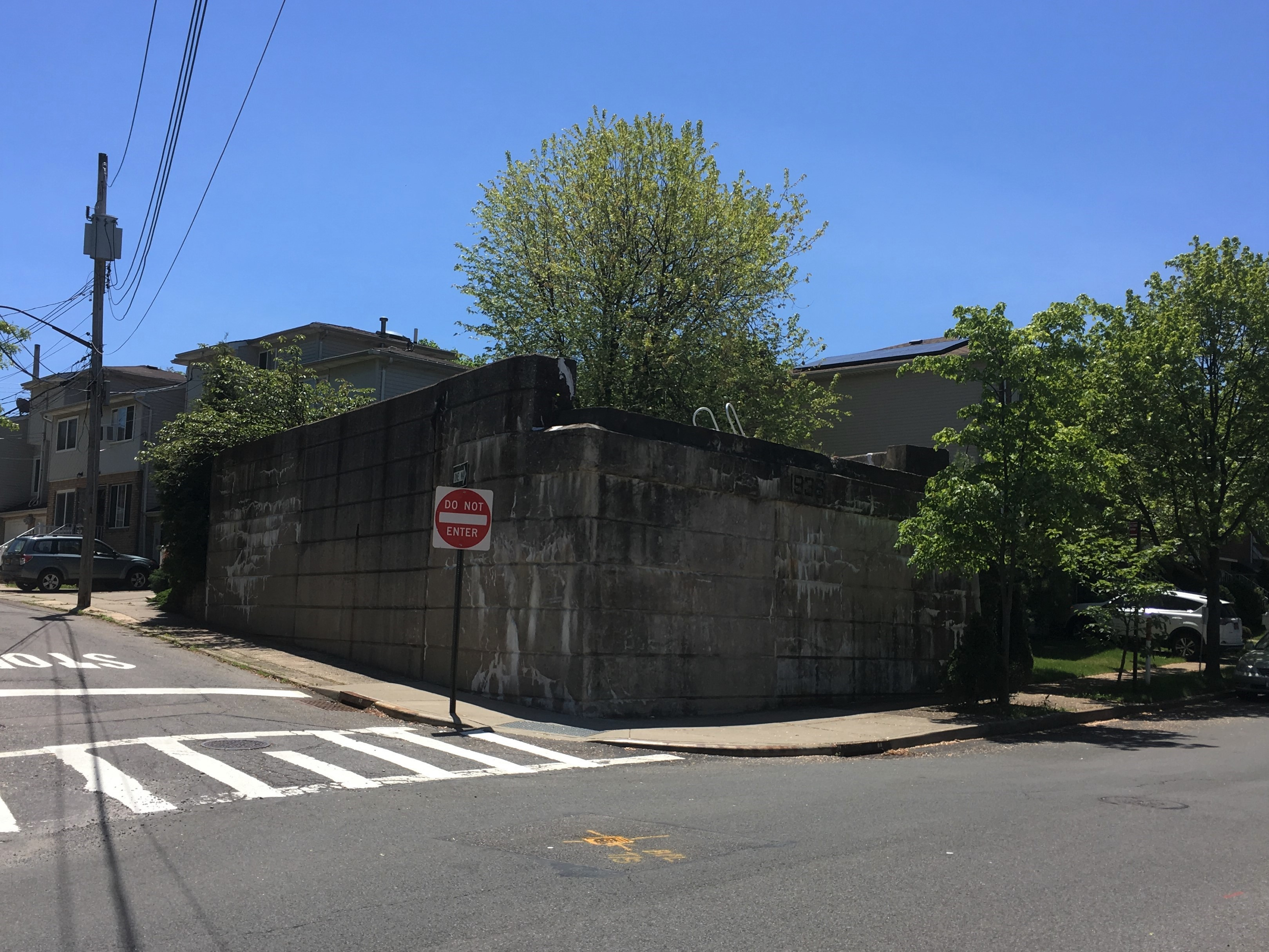
St. Johns Avenue embankment

The South Beach Branch was abandoned and demolished except for three segments: a concrete embankment on Saint John's Avenue, a trestle spanning Robin Road in Arrochar, and a filled-in bridge which McClean Avenue crosses over.

The original South Beach right-of-way remained well into the 1990s, and the former right-of-way is still traceable on maps. Today, houses stand on most of the line, and some of it was demolished in the early 1960s to make way for the Verrazzano Bridge toll plaza and access ramps. While that was being built, the Lily Pond Avenue overpass was built to align perfectly with the old railroad right-of-way, just in case the line was ever to be reactivated. Reactivating the South Beach Branch would have required tunneling under the bridge toll plaza and removing several buildings on the right-of-way, according to a 1991 study. Portions of the right-of-way were owned by CSX Corporation.

The Robin Road Trestle is the only remaining intact trestle along the former line. In the early 2000s, developers purchased the property on either side of the trestle's abutments, but the developers, the New York City Department of Transportation, and the New York City Transit Authority all claimed ownership of it. Consequently, the trestle was never demolished and townhouses have built up against both sides of it.

Railroad Avenue still exists alongside the line's right-of-way. In addition, the street grid is interrupted by the line's old right-of-way, and a few supporting structures still exist.

== Station list ==
Miles	Name	Opened	Closed	Notes
2.0	Bachmann	January 1, 1888	1937	Also called Bachmann's
2.1	Rosebank	January 1, 1888	March 31, 1953	
2.5	Belair Road	January 1, 1888	March 31, 1953	
2.7	Fort Wadsworth	January 1, 1888	March 31, 1953	
3.2	Arrochar	January 1, 1888	March 31, 1953	
3.5	Cedar Avenue	1931	March 31, 1953	
3.9	South Beach	1889	March 31, 1953	
4.1	Wentworth Avenue	1925	March 31, 1953	
