= Wentworth Avenue station =

Staten Island Railway station (1925–53)

Wentworth Avenue

General information
- Location: Staten Island
- Coordinates: 40.589028°N 74.069861°W
- Line: South Beach Branch
- Platforms: 1 side platform
- Tracks: 1

History
- Opened: 1925; 101 years ago
- Closed: March 31, 1953; 73 years ago

Former services
Preceding station	Staten Island Railway	Following station
South Beach toward Clifton	South Beach Branch	Terminus
Location

Wentworth Avenue was a station on the demolished South Beach Branch of the Staten Island Railway. It had one side platform served by one track and was located at Oceanside Avenue and Wentworth Avenue, which has been restored to a Bluebelt wetland since its acquisition by the NYC DEP as part of the South Beach Drainage Plan. Much of the area along the coast nearby has been similarly acquired by city or state agencies in order to allow for storm protection since the devastation wrought by Hurricane Sandy.

== History ==
This station was the last stop on the South Beach Branch, and was the smallest and easternmost Baltimore and Ohio Railroad station. The South Beach Branch was planned to continue past this point to Prominard Street at Oakwood Beach, but was not built beyond Wentworth Avenue because the branch would have crossed the Vanderbilt family farm. This station was built in 1925, when the South Beach Branch was electrified. This platform was only a door's length and had to be keyed open by the conductor. The platform's length was 20 feet 11 inches. The station had electric lights, but there was no electrical switch for them at the station. Instead, the ticket agent at South Beach controlled the lights. This station was abandoned when the SIRT discontinued passenger service on the entire South Beach Branch at midnight on March 31, 1953, because of city-operated bus competition. All traces of the station have been eliminated, as well as adjacent streets and access roads.
