= Clifton station (Staten Island Railway) =

Railway station in New York, United States

Clifton
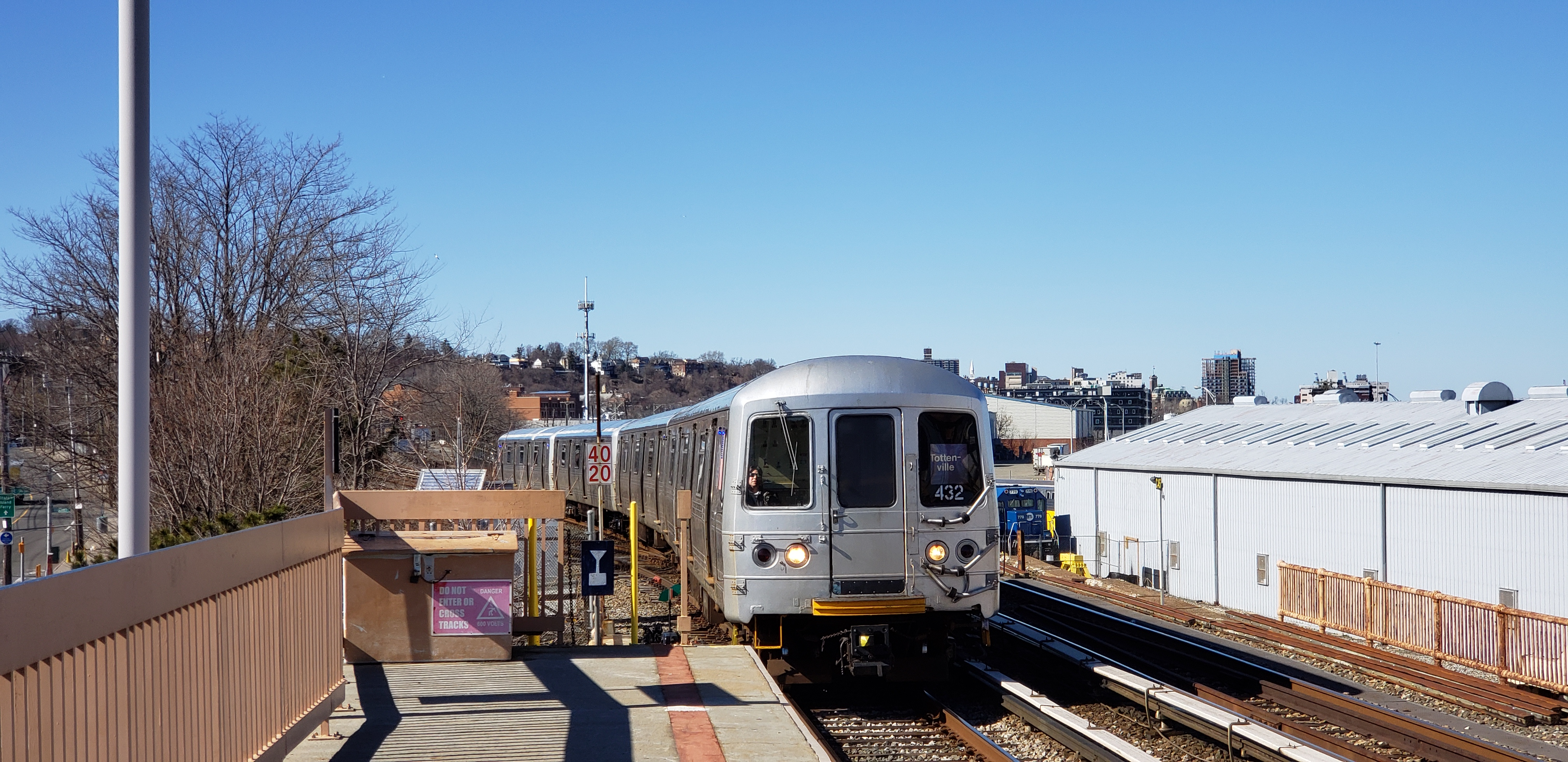
- Tottenville Local arriving at Clifton

General information
- Location: Bay Street and Townsend Avenue; Clifton, Staten Island
- Coordinates: 40.6215°N 74.0715°W
- Platforms: 2 side platforms
- Tracks: 2
- Connections: NYCT Bus: S51, S81

Construction
- Structure type: Embankment / Elevated
- Accessible: No; planned

Other information
- Station code: 504

History
- Opened: April 23, 1860; 166 years ago
- Former names: Vanderbilt's Landing; Vanderbilt Avenue

Services
Preceding station	Staten Island Railway	Following station
Stapleton toward St. George	Staten Island Railway	Grasmere toward Tottenville
Former services
Preceding station	Staten Island Railway	Following station
Terminus	South Beach Branch	Bachmann Closed 1937 toward Wentworth Avenue
Track layout
Location

Clifton station is a Staten Island Railway station in the neighborhood of Clifton, Staten Island, New York. This station was the original terminal of the Staten Island Railway from 1860 until 1886. The station was known as Vanderbilt's Landing, and was used as a transfer point for passengers going to Manhattan via ferries to South Ferry.

== History ==
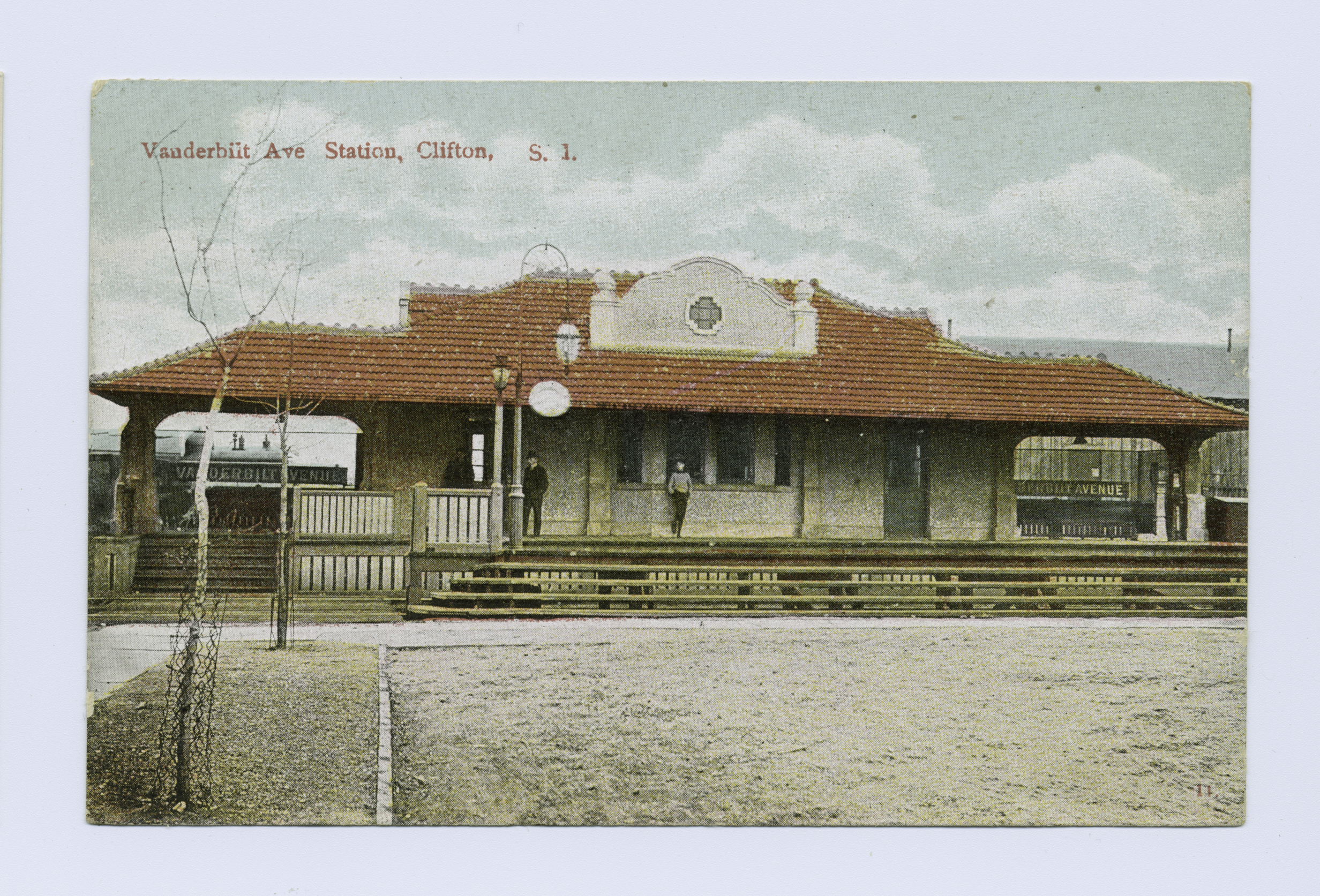
Vanderbilt Avenue station, Clifton, early 20th century

This station was originally known as Vanderbilt's Landing and opened on April 23, 1860 with the opening of the Staten Island Railway, and was the northern terminal for the line. The line extended from Vanderbilt's Landing to Eltingville. The station was also once known as Vanderbilt Avenue. It also included a ferry port with ferries to Stapleton, Tompkinsville, and South Ferry in Manhattan. The port was replaced by Saint George Terminal on March 7, 1886, which was also the day before Clifton became the northern terminus of the South Beach Branch, a status it maintained until 1953.

In 2019, the Metropolitan Transportation Authority announced that this station would become ADA-accessible as part of the agency's 2020–2024 Capital Program. The accessibility project was to be funded by congestion pricing in New York City, but it was postponed in June 2024 after the implementation of congestion pricing was delayed.

== Station layout ==
Clifton station is located at Norwood Avenue and Bay Street on the main line. It is located on an embankment with side platforms and beige canopies.

The SIR's Clifton Yard is next to the northbound track, with yard leads and signals north of Clifton station. South of the station are the remains of the South Beach Branch turnout and a dismantled bridge. To the south, a spur on a pair of I-beams on concrete pillars is the location of an old coal, concrete, and lumber business. South of this station, the SIR main line turns southwest to Tottenville, and no longer runs along the harbor front.

Due to the wide space from trains caused by the platform's curvature, certain doors on St. George-bound trains do not open here. The first three cars open entirely, while the fourth car only has the front three doors open, and the last car does not open at all.

Platform level	Side platform
Platform level	Southbound	← toward Tottenville (Grasmere) ← rush hour express does not stop here
Platform level	Northbound	toward St. George (Stapleton) → AM rush express does not stop here →
Platform level	Side platform
Ground	Street level	Exit/entrance, buses

=== Exits ===
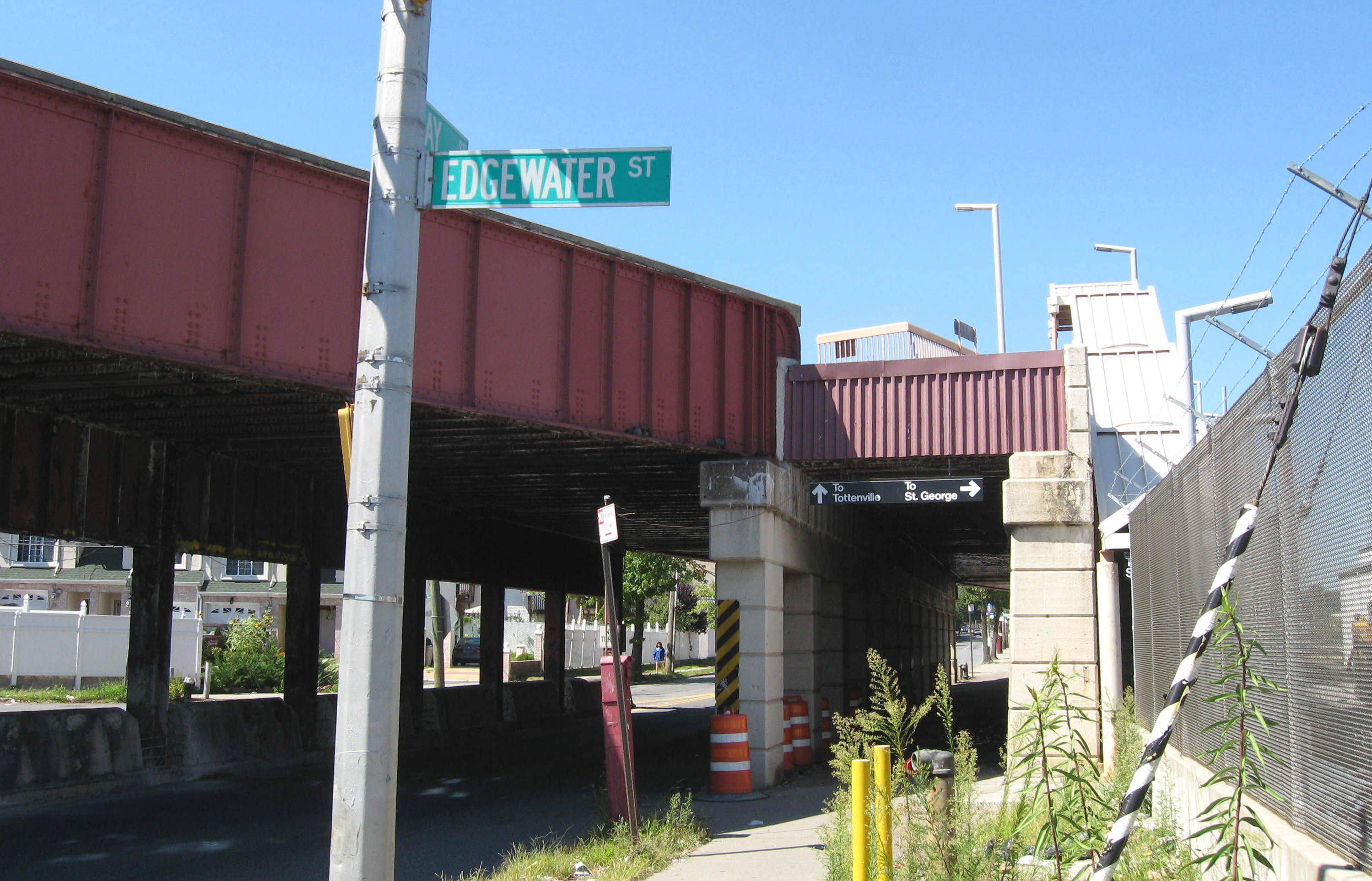
Northbound entrance, Bay Street

The north end has exits on both platforms that lead to Bay Street. The southbound platform has winding stairs to Townsend Avenue while the northbound platform has stairs under the right-of-way to Norwood Avenue. The northbound platform also has a second staircase on Bay and Edgewater Streets, which is not present on the southbound side.

On Bay Street (sidewalk level) and facing the platform above, are remains of the original steps up to the old station platform, which became inaccessible when the platforms were extended in the 1990s. On the southbound side there is a station house on the outside, but only a shelter on the platform. Some of the boarded up windows and layout of the brick shelter suggest that it was originally a station house.
