= Ocean Park station (Staten Island Railway) =

Subway station in Staten Island, New York, U.S.

Ocean Park

General information
- Location: Annadale; Staten Island
- Line: SIR Main Line
- Tracks: 2

Former services
Preceding station	Staten Island Railway	Following station
Annadale toward St. George	Tottenville – St. George	Huguenot toward Tottenville

Ocean Park is an abandoned Staten Island Railway station in the neighborhood of Annadale, Staten Island, New York. The station was a flag stop and was located between Annadale and Huguenot. The station is listed as being open in 1889 and 1890. This station was not listed on a map from 1889.
