= Huguenot, Staten Island =

Neighborhood in New York City

Huguenot
- Neighborhood of Staten Island
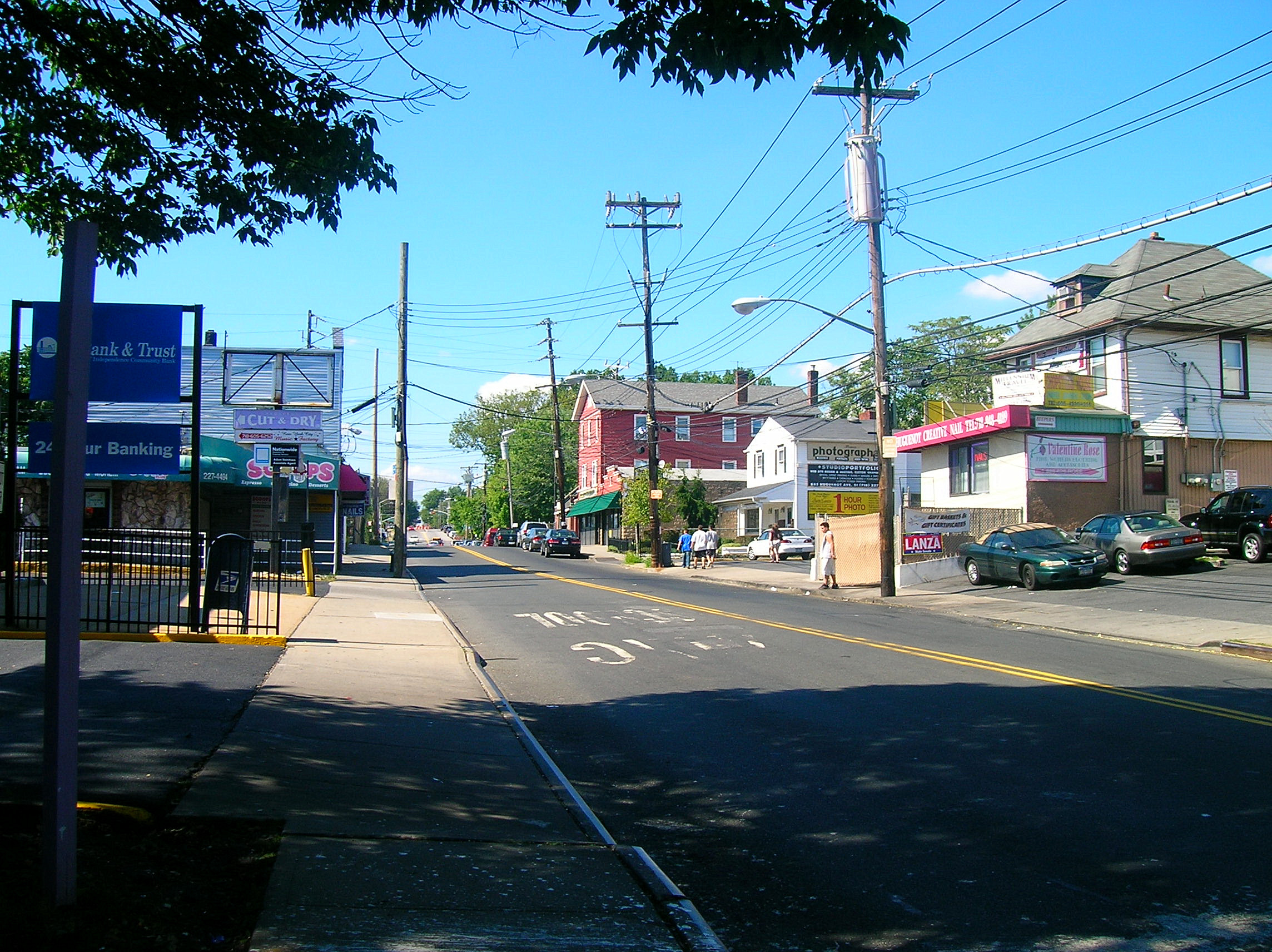
- Huguenot Avenue (August 2006)
- Interactive map of Huguenot
- Coordinates: 40°32′14″N 74°11′40″W
- Country: United States
- State: New York
- City: New York City
- Borough: Staten Island
- Named for: The Huguenots
- Time zone: UTC-5 (EST)
  - Summer (DST): UTC-4 (EDT)
- ZIP Code: 10312
- Area codes: 718/347/929, 917

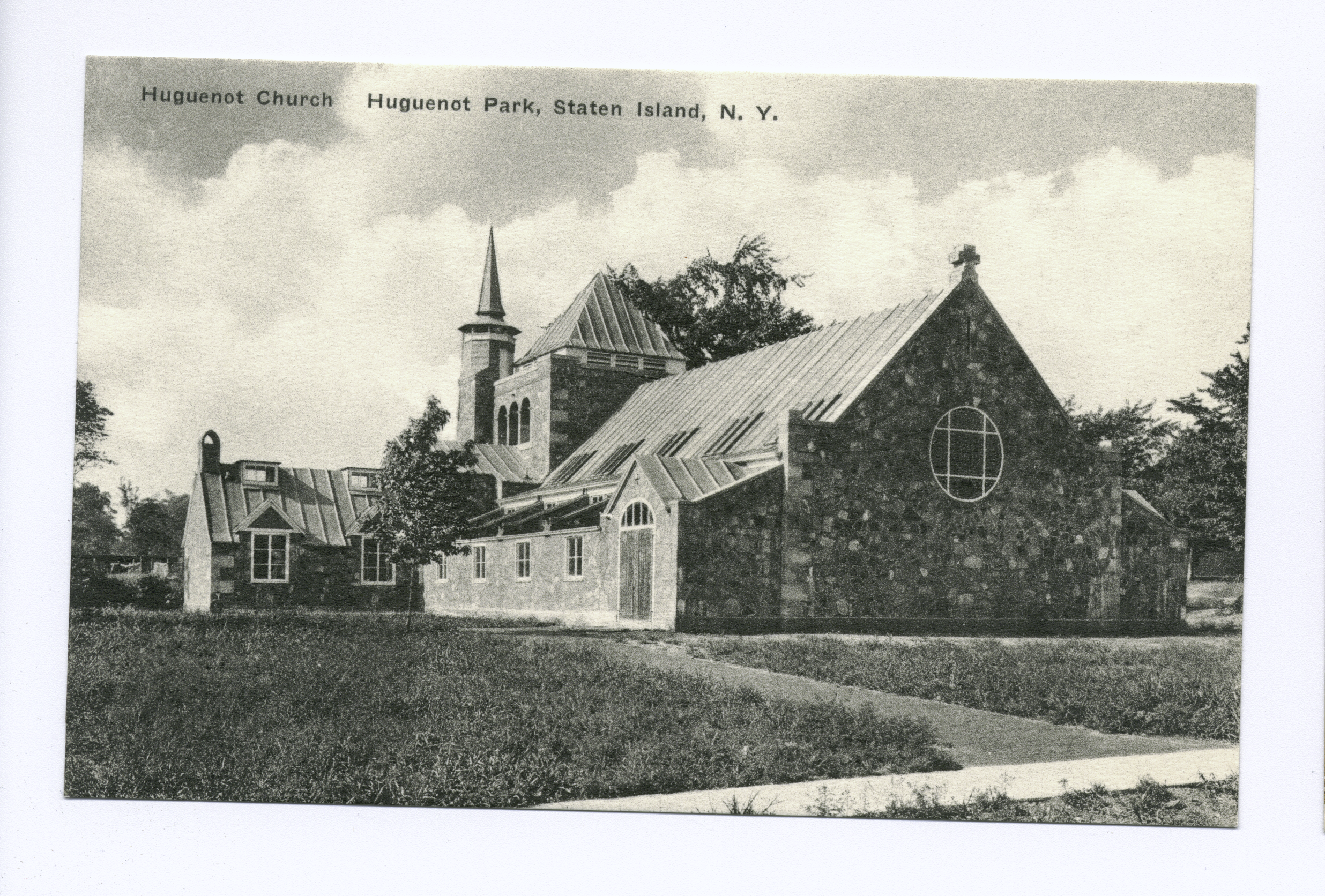
Huguenot Church, early 20th century

Huguenot is a neighborhood on the South Shore of Staten Island, New York City. Originally named "Bloomingview", it was later named for the Huguenots, led by Daniel Perrin, who settled in the area during the late 17th and early 18th centuries to escape religious persecution. Huguenot is bordered by Arden Heights to the north, Woodrow to the west, Prince's Bay to the south, and Annadale to the east. The neighborhood is represented in the New York City Council by Joe Borelli, who was born and raised there. Huguenot is represented in the New York State Senate by Andrew Lanza and in the New York State Assembly by Michael Reilly.

== History ==
The community was named after French Protestants fleeing persecution in Catholic-dominated France who settled in the area in the 17th century, and formed one of the first permanent settlements on Staten Island.

The Huguenot station along the Staten Island Railway opened when the railroad was extended to Tottenville in 1860. This station was given the name "Huguenot Park", even though no park was actually located nearby, and by 1971 the word "Park" had been dropped. The name survives in the Huguenot Park branch of the New York Public Library was opened one block west of the station.

== Demographics ==
For census purposes, the New York City Department of City Planning classifies Huguenot as part of a larger Neighborhood Tabulation Area called Annadale-Huguenot-Prince's Bay-Woodrow SI0304. This designated neighborhood had 40,534 inhabitants based on data from the 2020 United States Census. This was an increase of 2,374 persons (6.2%) from the 38,160 counted in 2010. The neighborhood had a population density of 9.9 inhabitants per acre (14,500/sq mi; 5,600/km2).

The racial makeup of the neighborhood was 82.1% (33,263) White (Non-Hispanic), 0.7% (299) Black (Non-Hispanic), 5.9% (2,372) Asian, 2.3% (945) from some other race or from two or more races. Hispanic or Latino of any race were 9.0% (3,655) of the population.

According to the 2020 United States Census, this area has many cultural communities of over 1,000 inhabitants. These groups are residents who identify as Puerto Rican, English, Polish, Russian, Chinese, German, Irish, and Italian.

Most inhabitants are higher-aged adults: 28.5% are between 45-64 years old. 74.1% of the households had at least one family present. Out of the 14,464 households, 58.0% had a married couple (23.3% with a child under 18), 3.9% had a cohabiting couple (1.2% with a child under 18), 14.8% had a single male (1.4% with a child under 18), and 23.2% had a single female (3.5% with a child under 18). 32.5% of households had children. In this neighborhood, 26.3% of non-vacant housing units are renter-occupied.

The entirety of Community District 3, which comprises Huguenot and other South Shore neighborhoods, had 159,132 inhabitants as of NYC Health's 2018 Community Health Profile, with an average life expectancy of 81.3 years at birth. This is about the same as the life expectancy of 81.2 for all New York City neighborhoods. Most inhabitants are youth and middle-aged adults: 21% are between the ages of 0 and 17, 26% between 25 and 44, and 29% between 45 and 64. The ratio of college-aged and elderly residents was lower, at 8% and 16% respectively.

As of 2017, the median household income in Community District 3 was $96,796. In 2018, an estimated 11% of South Shore residents lived in poverty, compared to 17% in all of Staten Island and 20% in all of New York City. On average during 2012–2016, one in sixteen South Shore residents (6%) were unemployed, compared to 6% in Staten Island and 9% in New York City. Rent burden, or the percentage of renters who paid more than 30% of their income for housing, was 42% for the South Shore, compared to the boroughwide and citywide rates of 49% and 51%, respectively. As of 2018, Huguenot and the South Shore were considered middle- to high-income relative to the rest of the city, and not gentrifying.

== Religion ==
The local Roman Catholic parish, Our Lady Star of the Sea, is one of the largest parishes on the South Shore, and has experienced overcrowding problems for many years because of the rapid boom of new residents in the area.

== Library (historic) ==
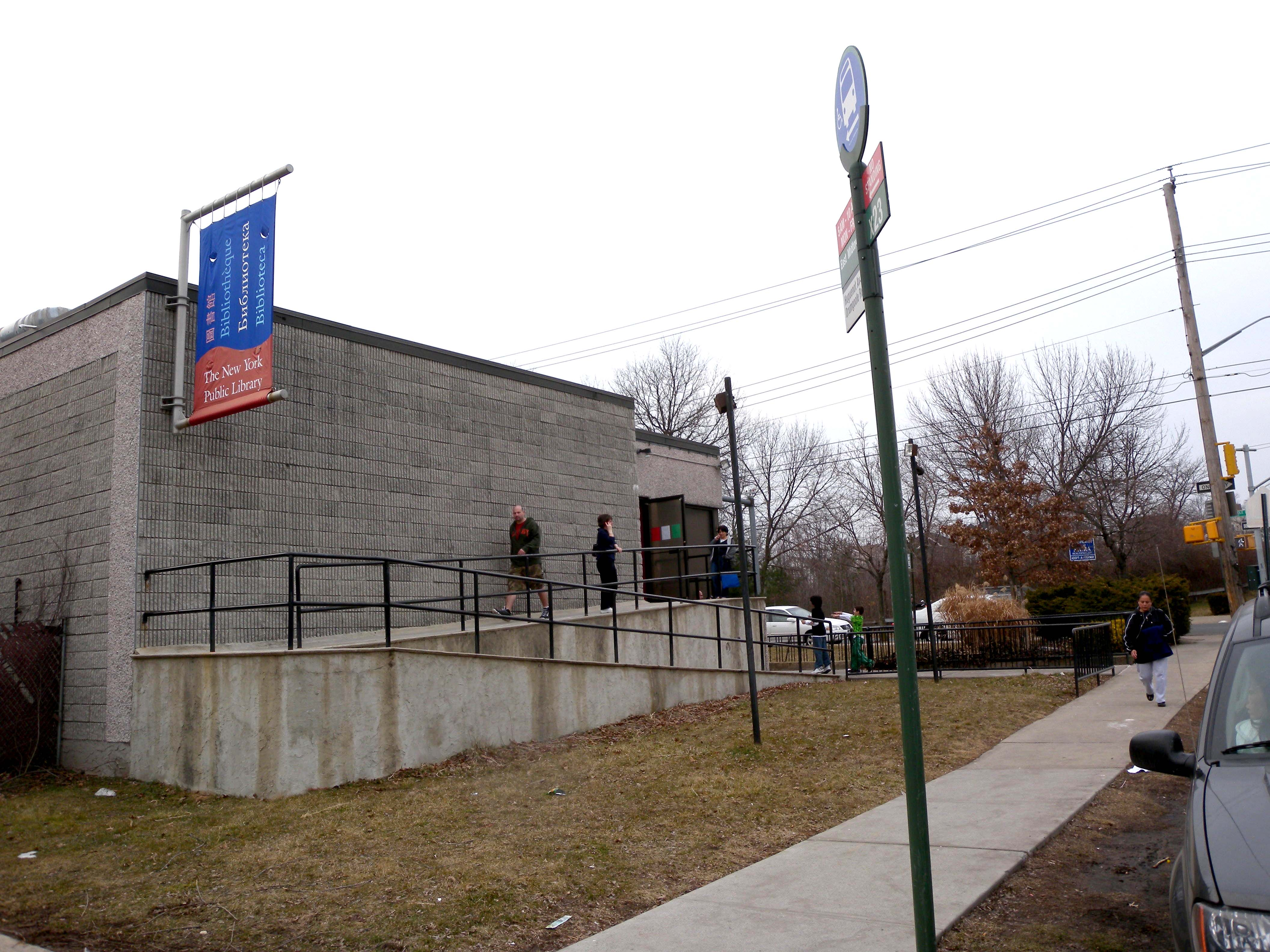
New York Public Library, Huguenot Park former location

The New York Public Library (NYPL) operates the Huguenot Park branch which was at 830 Huguenot Avenue, near the intersection with Drumgoole Road East, before moving to Woodrow Plaza. The branch opened in January 1985, replacing what was once the smallest New York Public Library building just east of the station (still standing). The Huguenot Park branch was possibly named in honor of the nearby Staten Island Railway station's former name. Patrons are currently anticipating the construction of a new library that would replace the existing facility located adjacent to Woodrow Plaza Mall. The proposed library is expected to span approximately 7,500 square feet and is intended to significantly improve library services and resources within the community. The current site at 830 Huguenot Avenue is permanently closed, and will remain a historic site a block down from the original building. The library is expected to be complete by July, 2026.

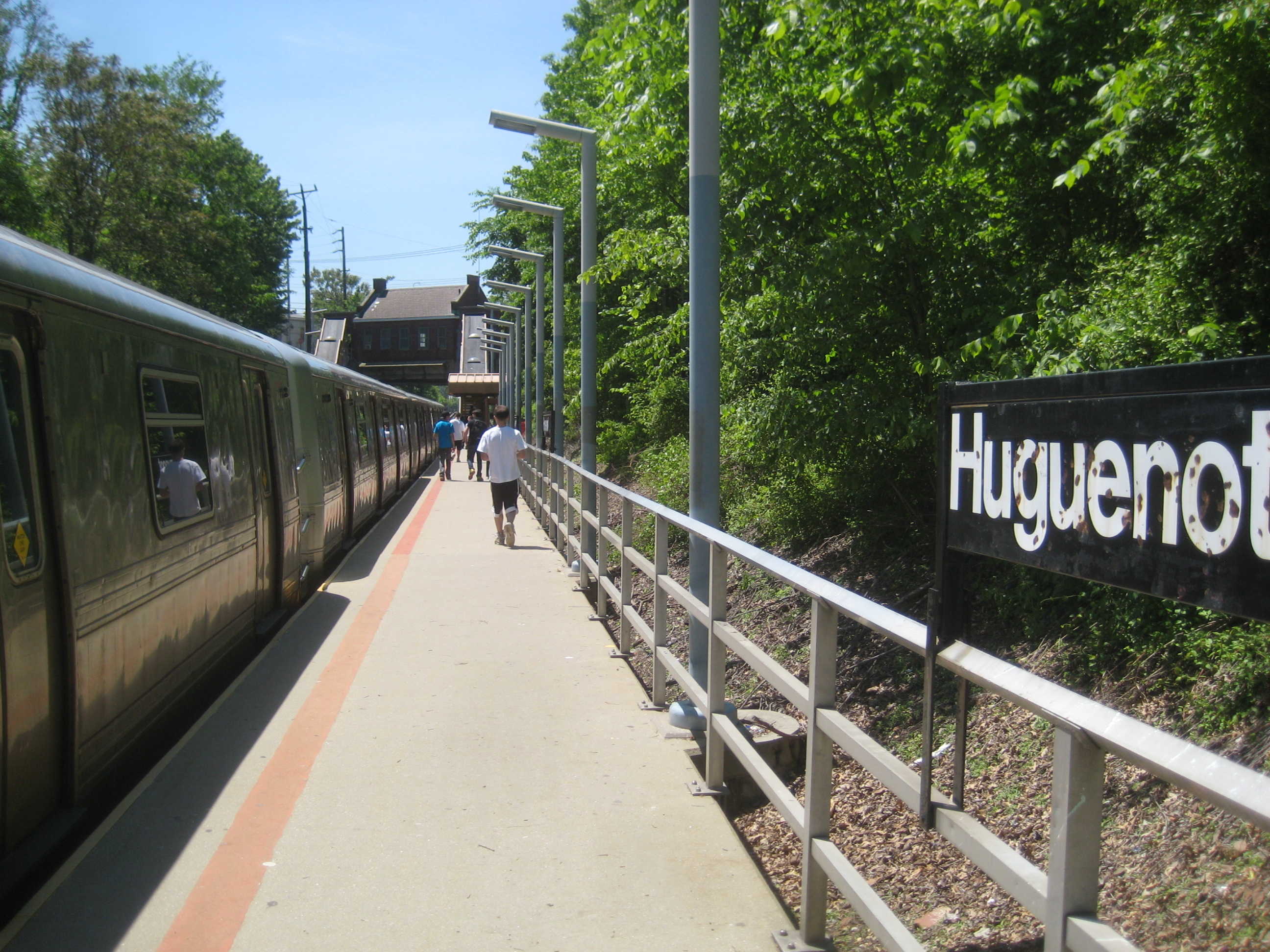
Huguenot Train Station

== Transportation ==
Huguenot is served by the Staten Island Railway at the Huguenot station. Huguenot is also served by the S55 and S56 local buses on Luten Avenue, and the S59 and S78 local buses on Hylan Boulevard. Express bus service is provided by the SIM2 along Huguenot Avenue and Woodrow Road, the SIM8 along Woodrow Road, the SIM25 along Foster Road, and the SIM24 along Huguenot Avenue.
