= Pleasant Plains station =

Staten Island Railway station

Pleasant Plains
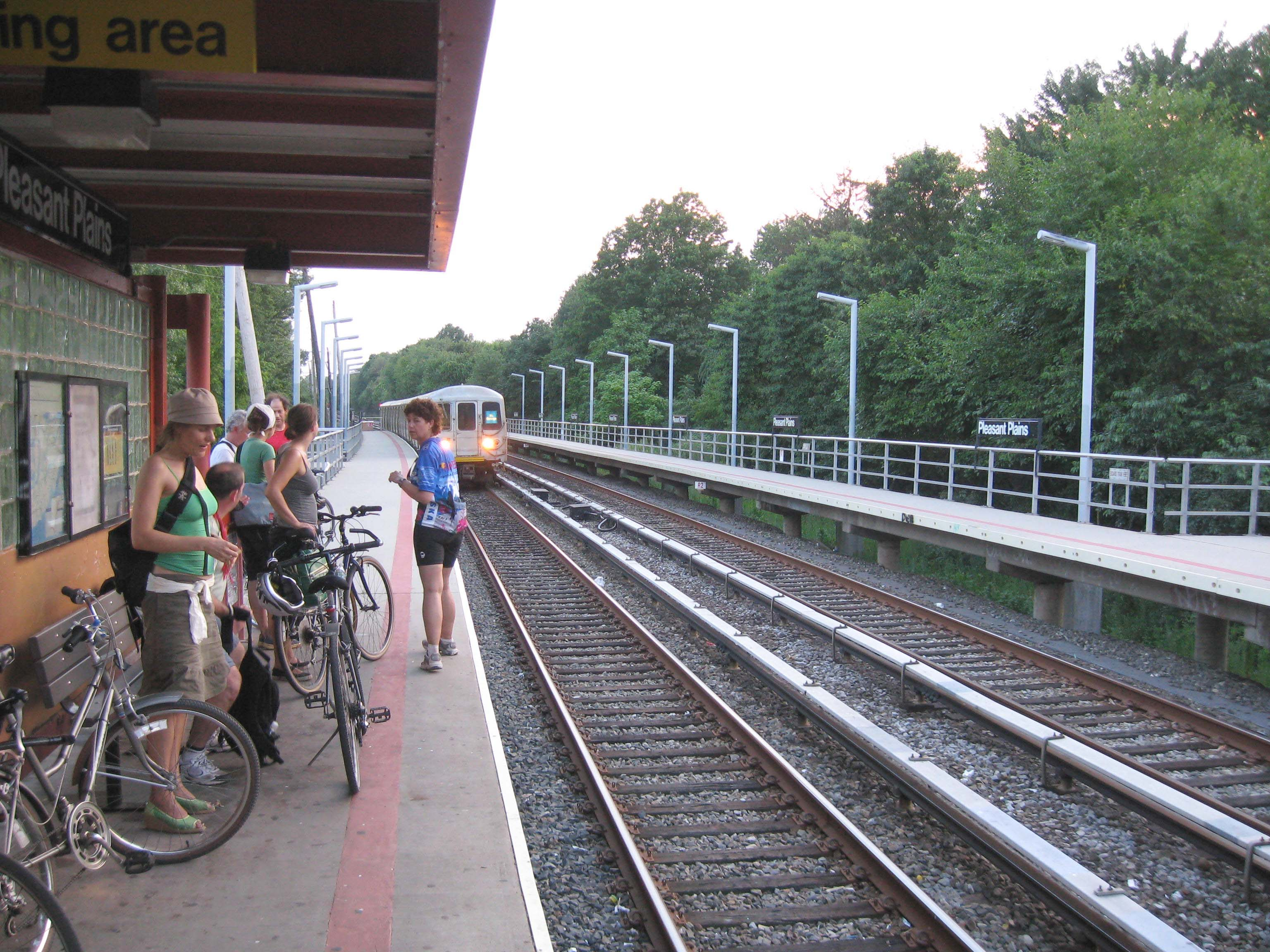
- Northbound train arriving

General information
- Location: Penton Street and Amboy Road; Pleasant Plains, Staten Island
- Coordinates: 40.5224°N 74.2179°W
- Platforms: 2 side platforms
- Tracks: 2
- Connections: NYCT Bus: S55, SIM26

Construction
- Structure type: Embankment

Other information
- Station code: 518

History
- Opened: June 2, 1860; 166 years ago

Services
Preceding station	Staten Island Railway	Following station
Prince's Bay toward St. George	Staten Island Railway	Richmond Valley toward Tottenville
Track layout
Location

The Pleasant Plains station is an elevated Staten Island Railway station in the neighborhood of Pleasant Plains, Staten Island, New York.

== History ==
The station opened on June 2, 1860, with the opening of the Staten Island Railway from Annadale to Tottenville.

In 1913, the station received several improvements. Electric lights were installed in the signals, platform, and station, a new concrete lack was installed on the station approach, metal sheet was installed to cover the waiting room and ticket office, and the station received a fresh coat of paint.

== Station layout ==
Located at Penton Street and Amboy Road, the station has two side platforms and orange canopies. Parts of the old northbound platforms are visible and can be viewed from either side at the north end of this station; wooden boards and concrete are evidence of this.

Platform level	Side platform
Platform level	Southbound	← toward Tottenville (Richmond Valley)
Platform level	Northbound	toward St. George (Prince's Bay) →
Platform level	Side platform
Ground	Street level	Exit/entrance, buses

=== Exit ===
The only exit is at the northeast end of each platform, which leads to Amboy Road via a 75-foot (23 m) long passage and steps.

== Mount Loretto Spur ==
South of the station is another set of crossovers and the right-of-way of the Mount Loretto Spur that formerly served the Mount Loretto orphanage. The B&O served the Mt. Loretto non-electrified branch until 1950, which had some industry and a passenger station. The Mt. Loretto branch track was removed in the 1960s and 1970s but some ties were visible until the 1980s. A coal dump trestle is all that remains, located behind the powerhouse.
