= Woods of Arden station =

Woods of Arden

General information
- Location: Arden Avenue and Whaley Avenue; Annadale, Staten Island
- Coordinates: 40.541929°N 74.170918°W
- Platforms: 2 side platforms
- Tracks: 2

History
- Opened: 1886; 140 years ago
- Closed: 1894–1895?

Former services
Preceding station	Staten Island Railway	Following station
Eltingville toward St. George	Tottenville – St. George	Annadale toward Tottenville
Location

Woods of Arden is a former Staten Island Railway station in the neighborhood of Annadale, Staten Island, New York. The station opened in 1886 with a cost of $112.55. The station closed after 1894. This station was located in between the Annadale and Eltingville stops.

Summer Sundays were spent picnicking, boating, and swimming at Woods of Arden. The resort also included an inn. Erastus Wiman, who helped organize Staten Island Rapid Transit was directly involved with the resort, and had a station built to provide access.
