= Prince's Bay station =

Staten Island Railway station

Prince's Bay
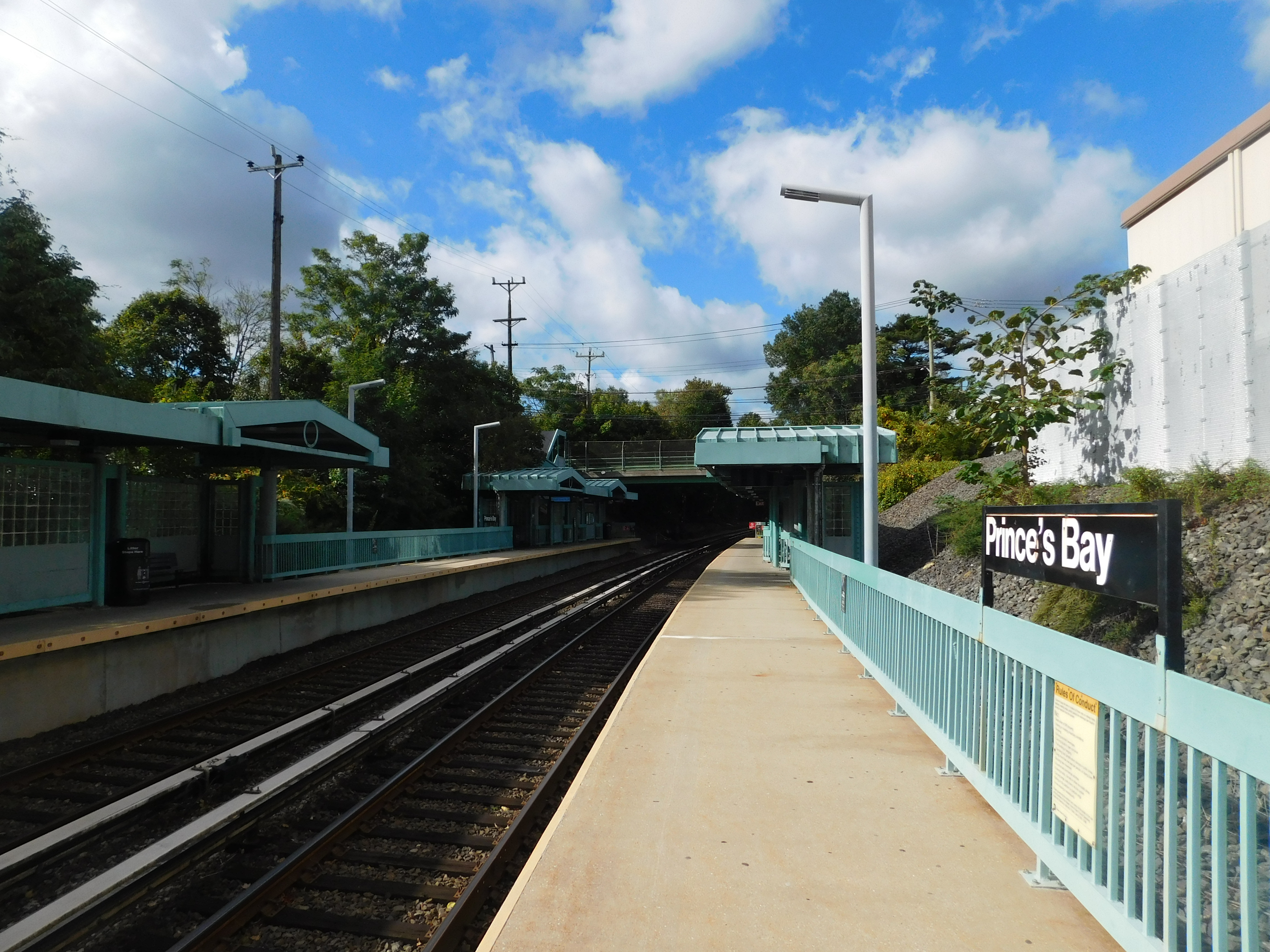
- View of platforms facing southbound

General information
- Location: Seguine Avenue and Waterbury Avenue; Prince's Bay, Staten Island
- Coordinates: 40.5254°N 74.2003°W
- Platforms: 2 side platforms
- Tracks: 2
- Connections: NYCT Bus: S55, S56, SIM25

Construction
- Structure type: Open-cut
- Accessible: accessibility planned

Other information
- Station code: 517

History
- Opened: June 2, 1860; 166 years ago
- Former names: Lemon Creek

Services
Preceding station	Staten Island Railway	Following station
Huguenot toward St. George	Staten Island Railway	Pleasant Plains toward Tottenville
Track layout
Location

The Prince's Bay station is a Staten Island Railway station in the neighborhood of Prince's Bay, Staten Island, New York.

== History ==
The station opened on June 2, 1860, as Lemon Creek, with the opening of the Staten Island Railway from Annadale to Tottenville. Prior to being placed in an open-cut the station consisted of a small platform connected to a small station house, which was connected to a two-story house. The platform could be reached by going up a short staircase.

This station was the last all-timber platform on the line before being replaced in the early 1990s.

== Station layout ==
The station is located near Seguine Avenue and Amboy Road on the main line, and is located is in an open-cut with two side platforms, green canopies, and walls of steel and concrete. A railroad spur leading to the St. George-bound tracks also exists just outside of this parking lot.

Maps do not show the station name with apostrophe while the station signs do; the latter is the historically correct (and official) name.

Ground	Street level	Station house, exit/entrance, buses
Platform level	Side platform
Platform level	Southbound	← toward Tottenville (Pleasant Plains)
Platform level	Northbound	toward St. George (Huguenot) →
Platform level	Side platform

=== Exits ===
There is an exit/entrance on the south end of each platform that allows access to Seguine Avenue. An exit/entrance on the northern end of the St. George (north) bound platform allows access to a small free commuter park & ride lot that is accessible from Herbert Street.
