= Mount Loretto Spur =

Former railroad branch in Staten Island, New York

Overview
- Status: Abandoned
- Owner: Staten Island Railway
- Locale: 40.520507°N 74.221585°W Staten Island, New York, USA
- Termini: Pleasant Plains; Mount Loretto Children's Home
- Stations: 1

Service
- System: Staten Island Railway
- Services: Mount Loretto Excursion Trains/Freight Trains
- Operator(s): Staten Island Railway

History
- Opened: c. 1891
- Closed: 1960s

Technical
- Number of tracks: 1
- Track gauge: 4 ft 8 1/2 in (1,435 mm)

The Mount Loretto Spur is an abandoned branch of the Staten Island Railway whose purpose was to serve the Mount Loretto Children's Home.

== Description ==
The spur diverged from the Main Line south of Pleasant Plains station. The branch was a little over a mile long and had a 2% grade. The right-of-way from the Amboy Road grade crossing to Mount Loretto was owned by the Archdiocese of New York, and was not open to the public. Mount Loretto paid for any necessary track maintenance, which was provided by the SIRT. The stop was called the Mission station and was located near Cunningham Road.

== History ==
The spur was built in 1891 to serve the Mount Loretto Children's Home, and was used to transport excursionists and to provide freight. The line was originally built to bring construction materials for large buildings at Mount Loretto and its powerhouse in the 1890s. Every third Sunday, the SIRT operated a special train from St. George Terminal to Mount Loretto and back, for relatives and visitors. The Archdiocese paid for the trips. This direct service ended in 1939 and chartered buses were used afterwards. The trains consisted of three steel cars and a steam locomotive, as the spur was never electrified.

=== Abandonment ===
The spur received regular freight shipments until the late 1950s, and was abandoned in the early 1960s, with the tracks removed soon after. Some ties were still visible until the 1980s. While the spur's junction was removed, the pilings that carried the tracks still exist. Parts of the right-of-way are now a hiking trail. At Mount Loretto, which closed in the 1960s and later experienced several fires, all that remains is a coal dump trestle.
