= Annadale, Staten Island =

Neighborhood in New York City

Coordinates: 40°32′40″N 74°10′35″W

Annadale
- Neighborhood
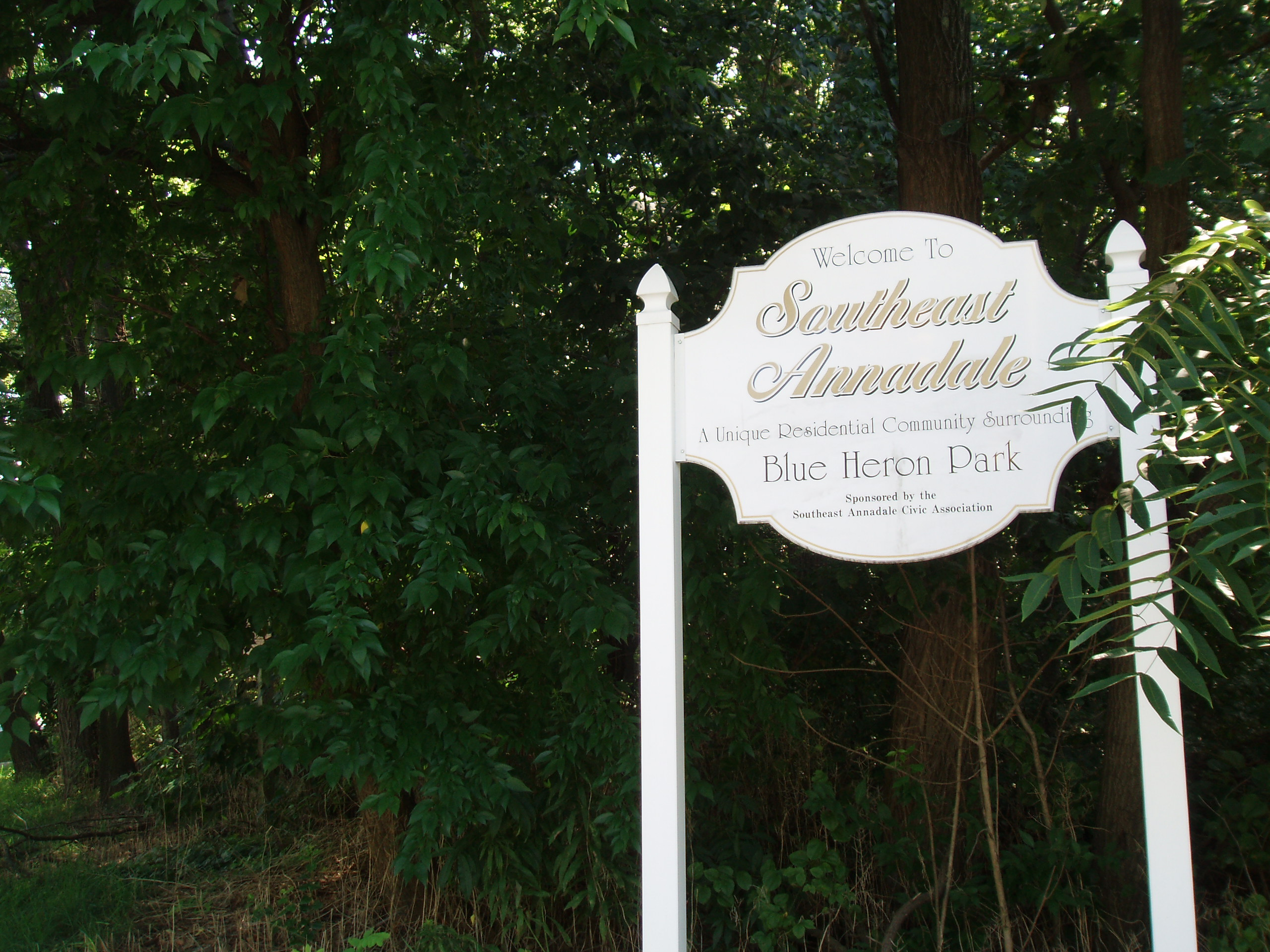
- Welcome to Annadale sign
- Interactive map of Annadale
- Country: United States
- State: New York
- City: New York City
- County/Borough: Richmond County/Staten Island
- Community District: Staten Island 3

Government
  - U.S. Representative: Nicole Malliotakis (R)
  - State senator: Andrew Lanza (R)
  - State assemblymember: Michael Reilly (R)
  - City councilmember: Joe Borelli (R)
- Time zone: UTC−5 (EST)
  - Summer (DST): UTC−4 (EDT)
- ZIP Codes: 1039, 1032
- Area codes: 718, 347, 929, and 917

Annadale is a middle-class neighborhood on the South Shore of the borough of Staten Island in New York City.

== History ==
The community received its present name circa 1860, and is named after Anna Seguine, a descendant of French Huguenots who were among the South Shore's earliest settlers; this settlement is also responsible for the neighborhood immediately to the southwest of Annadale being named Huguenot, and the Seguine family also lends its name to Seguine Avenue, the principal north–south thoroughfare on the east side of Prince's Bay, the next neighborhood southwest of Huguenot.

In 1929, immigrants from Spain purchased land along the Annadale shoreline, and founded a settlement that became known as the Spanish Camp, or Spanish Colony. First tents, and later bungalows, were built at the site. The site was purchased and buildings demolished at the end of the 20th century so that several large, upscale homes could be constructed.

== Geography ==
Annadale once had abundant woodland, but much of it was cleared in the last three decades of the 20th Century to make room for new homes. However, a city park in the heart of the neighborhood was converted into a wildlife preserve; known as Blue Heron Park Preserve, it covers 222 acres (898,000 m^{2}), much of it consisting of ponds, swamps and small streams which empty into nearby Raritan Bay.

The northwestern part of Annadale is now often regarded as a separate neighborhood known as Arden Heights. Southeast Annadale also harbors its own identity separate from the rest of the neighborhood. This section of Annadale is most often associated with Blue Heron Park.

== Demographics ==
For census purposes, the New York City Department of City Planning classifies Annadale as part of a larger Neighborhood Tabulation Area called Annadale-Huguenot-Prince's Bay-Woodrow SI0304. This designated neighborhood had 40,534 inhabitants based on data from the 2020 United States Census. This was an increase of 2,374 persons (6.2%) from the 38,160 counted in 2010. The neighborhood had a population density of 9.9 inhabitants per acre (14,500/sq mi; 5,600/km2).

The racial makeup of the neighborhood was 82.1% (33,263) White (Non-Hispanic), 0.7% (299) Black (Non-Hispanic), 5.9% (2,372) Asian, 2.3% (945) from some other race or from two or more races. Hispanic or Latino of any race were 9.0% (3,655) of the population.

According to the 2020 United States Census, this area has many cultural communities of over 1,000 inhabitants. These groups are residents who identify as Puerto Rican, English, Polish, Russian, Chinese, German, Irish, and Italian.

Most inhabitants are higher-aged adults: 28.5% are between 45-64 years old. 74.1% of the households had at least one family present. Out of the 14,464 households, 58.0% had a married couple (23.3% with a child under 18), 3.9% had a cohabiting couple (1.2% with a child under 18), 14.8% had a single male (1.4% with a child under 18), and 23.2% had a single female (3.5% with a child under 18). 32.5% of households had children. In this neighborhood, 26.3% of non-vacant housing units are renter-occupied.

The entirety of Community District 3, which comprises Annadale and other South Shore neighborhoods, had 159,132 inhabitants as of NYC Health's 2018 Community Health Profile, with an average life expectancy of 81.3 years at birth. This is about the same as the life expectancy of 81.2 for all New York City neighborhoods. Most inhabitants are youth and middle-aged adults: 21% are between the ages of 0 and 17, 26% between 25 and 44, and 29% between 45 and 64. The ratio of college-aged and elderly residents was lower, at 8% and 16% respectively.

As of 2017, the median household income in Community District 3 was $96,796. In 2018, an estimated 11% of South Shore residents lived in poverty, compared to 17% in all of Staten Island and 20% in all of New York City. On average during 2012–2016, one in sixteen South Shore residents (6%) were unemployed, compared to 6% in Staten Island and 9% in New York City. Rent burden, or the percentage of renters who paid more than 30% of their income for housing, was 42% for the South Shore, compared to the boroughwide and citywide rates of 49% and 51%, respectively. As of 2018, Annadale and the South Shore were considered middle- to high-income relative to the rest of the city, and not gentrifying.

== Public libraries ==
New York Public Library operates the Huguenot Park Branch, which serves Annadale and other neighborhoods, at 830 Huguenot Avenue at Drumgoole Road East. The branch opened in January 1985.

== Transportation ==
Annadale is served by the Staten Island Railway's Annadale Station, on Annadale Road in the heart of the town.

It is served by the S55, S59 and S78 local buses and the SIM2, SIM4, SIM23 and SIM24 express buses.

Korean War Veterans Parkway passes through Annadale.
