= Eltingville station =

Staten Island Railway station

Eltingville
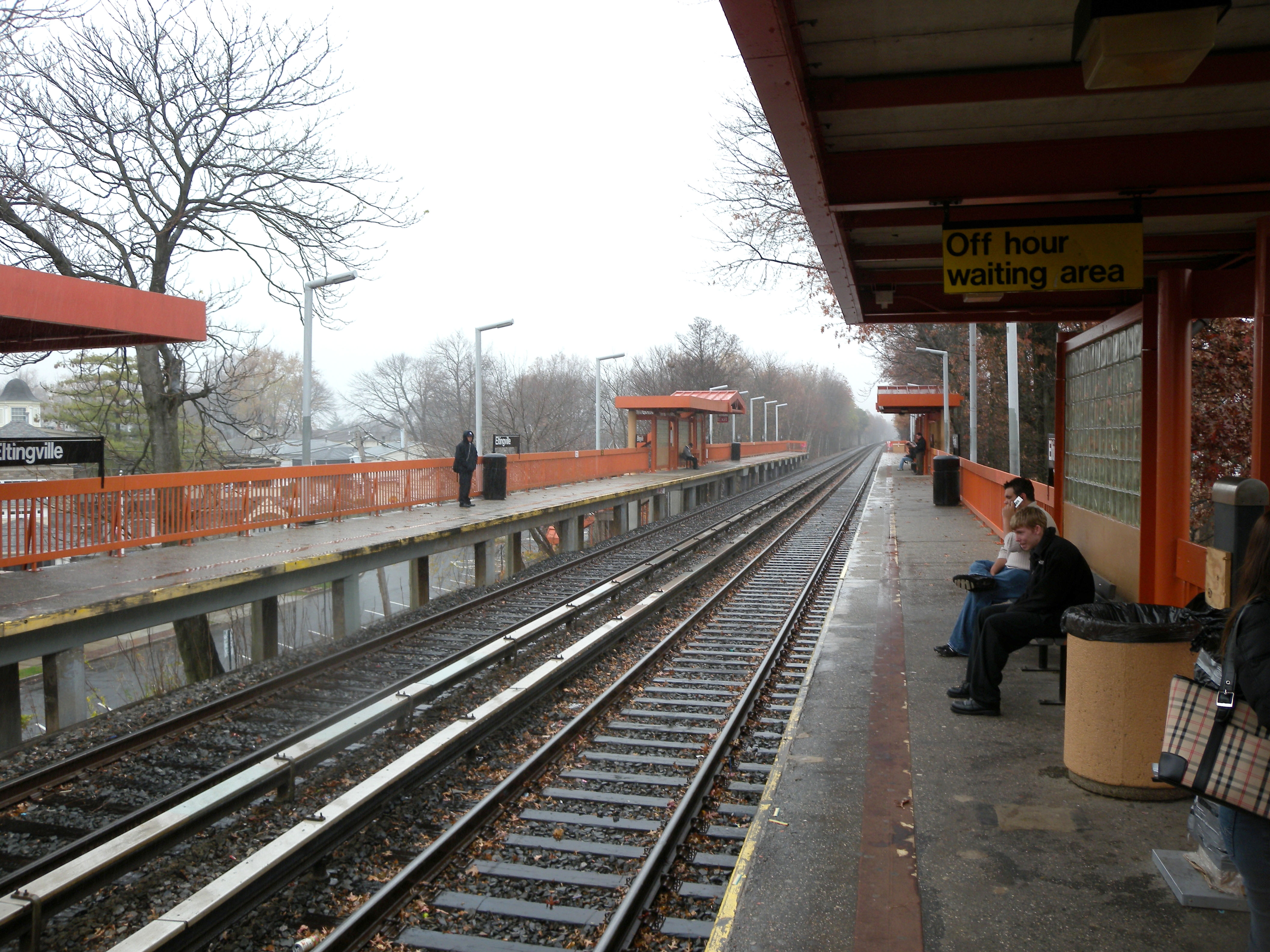
- Platforms looking towards the St. George Terminal

General information
- Location: Richmond Avenue and Eltingville Boulevard; Eltingville, Staten Island
- Coordinates: 40.5444°N 74.1651°W
- Platforms: 2 side platforms
- Tracks: 2
- Connections: NYCT Bus: S59, S79 SBS, S89, SIM1, SIM1C, SIM7, SIM10, SIM22

Construction
- Structure type: Embankment

Other information
- Station code: 514

History
- Opened: April 23, 1860; 166 years ago
- Rebuilt: 1939

Services
Preceding station	Staten Island Railway	Following station
Great Kills toward St. George	Staten Island Railway	Annadale toward Tottenville

Former services
Preceding station	Staten Island Railway	Following station
Great Kills toward St. George	Tottenville – St. George	Woods of Arden toward Tottenville
Track layout
Location

The Eltingville station is an elevated Staten Island Railway station in the neighborhood of Eltingville, Staten Island, New York. It is located at Richmond Avenue on the main line.

== History ==
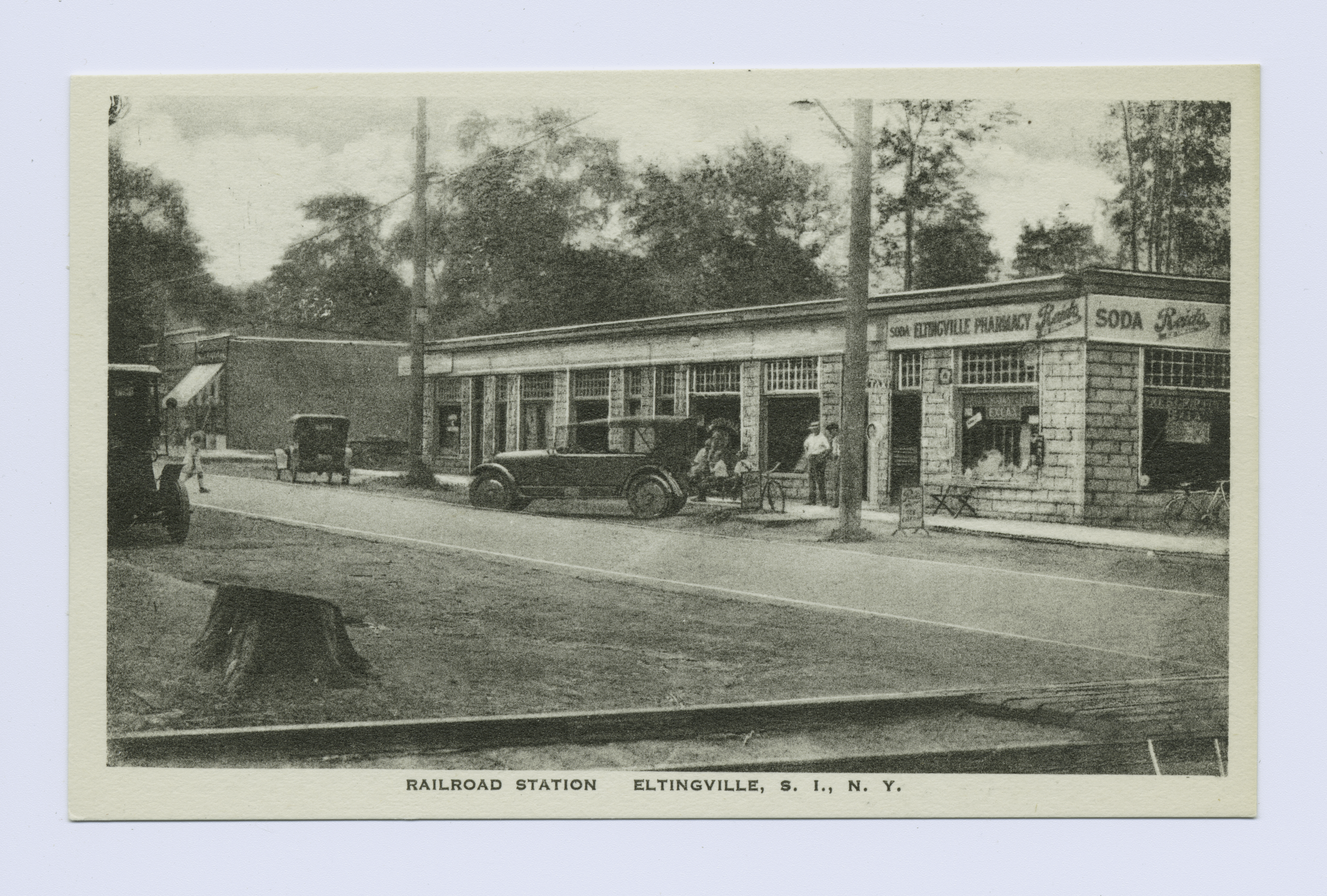
Surface level, early 20th century

The station opened on April 23, 1860, with the opening of the Staten Island Railway from Vanderbilt's Landing to Eltingville. The station was rebuilt in 1939 as part of a grade crossing elimination project. The station house at this station was being closed for structural renovations and critical repairs from December 28, 2024 to January 16, 2025.

== Station layout ==
The station contains two side platforms and orange canopies and walls. It is a transfer point for local buses to the Staten Island Mall, located two miles north of this station, as well as express buses to Manhattan.

Platform level	Side platform
Platform level	Southbound	← toward Tottenville (Annadale)
Platform level	Northbound	toward St. George (Great Kills) →
Platform level	Side platform
Ground	Street level	Exit/entrance, buses, station house

=== Exits ===
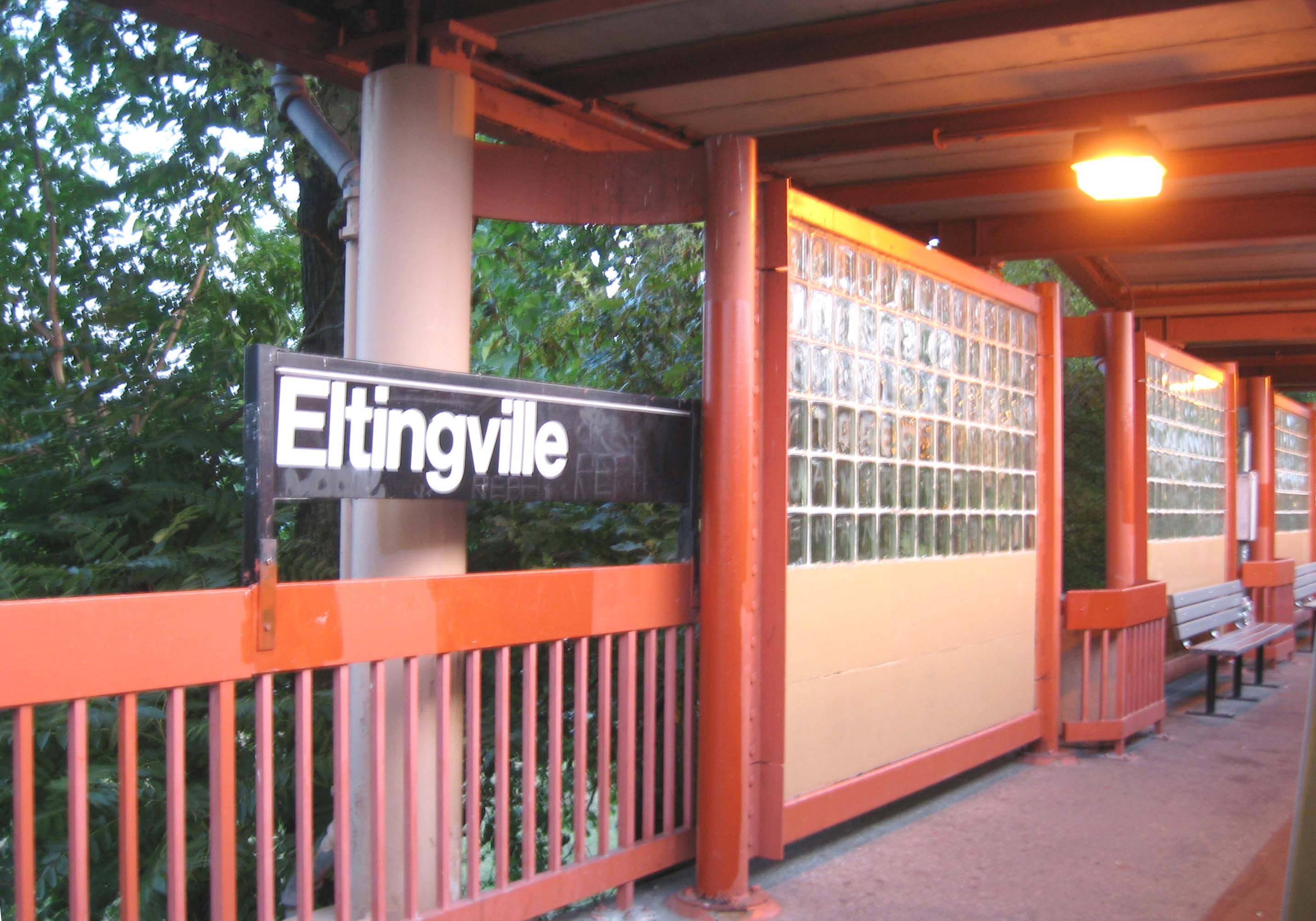
Northbound platform with contemporary Helvetica sign

There are staircases at the western end only that lead to Richmond Avenue. The southbound platform contains another exit on the eastern end that leads to Eltingville Boulevard. The station house at Richmond Avenue is at street level and once featured a signal lamp that alerted those waiting that a train was arriving. On the exterior of this station house is a plaque noting the Great Kills to Huguenot grade separation project was done under the auspices of the Public Works Administration.
