= Huguenot station =

Staten Island Railway station

Huguenot
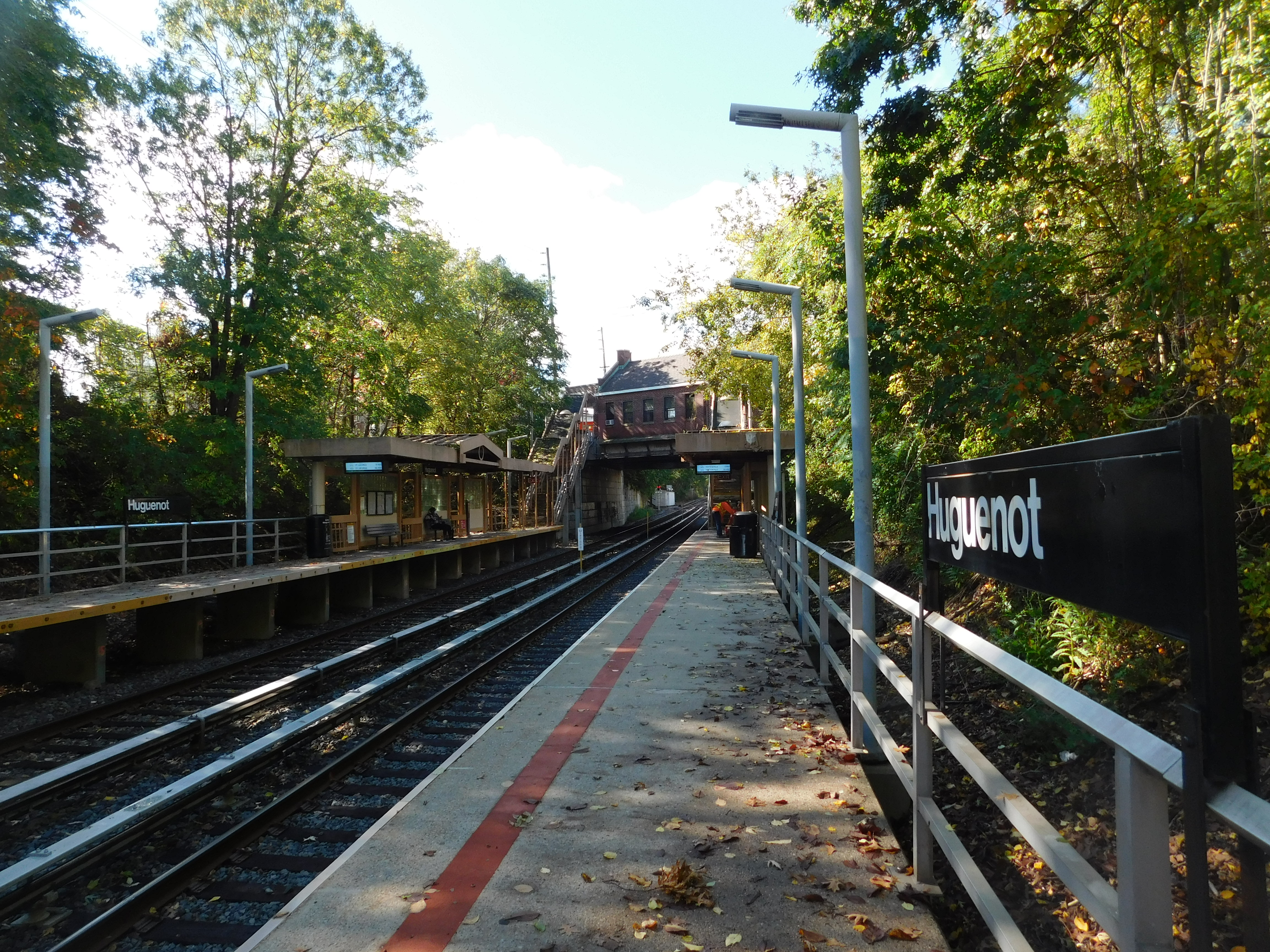
- Huguenot station in September 2020

General information
- Location: Huguenot Avenue and West Terrace; Huguenot, Staten Island
- Coordinates: 40.5336°N 74.1919°W
- Platforms: 2 side platforms
- Tracks: 2
- Connections: NYCT Bus: S55, SIM2, SIM24

Construction
- Structure type: Open-cut
- Accessible: construction

Other information
- Station code: 516

History
- Opened: June 2, 1860; 166 years ago
- Former names: Bloomingview; Huguenot Park

Services
Preceding station	Staten Island Railway	Following station
Annadale toward St. George	Staten Island Railway	Prince's Bay toward Tottenville

Former services
Preceding station	Staten Island Railway	Following station
Ocean Park toward St. George	Tottenville – St. George	Prince's Bay toward Tottenville
Track layout
Location

The Huguenot station is a Staten Island Railway station in the neighborhood of Huguenot, Staten Island, New York.

== History ==
The station opened on June 2, 1860, with the opening of the Staten Island Railway from Annadale to Tottenville. The station's original name was Bloomingview, named after the former town of Bloomingview, which is present day Huguenot. Afterwards the station was named "Huguenot Park," which was shortened to simply "Huguenot" by the Metropolitan Transportation Authority (MTA) shortly after it took control of the railway from the Baltimore and Ohio Railroad in 1971 (the MTA also shortened the name of the "Old Town Road" station to simply "Old Town" at that time).

In 2019, the MTA announced that this station would become ADA-accessible as part of the agency's 2020–2024 Capital Program.

A request for proposals was put out on May 18, 2023 for the contract for a project bundle to make 13 stations accessible, including Huguenot. A contract for two ramps at the station was awarded in December 2023. Construction work on the ADA accessible ramp and elevator began in 2024.

== Station layout ==
The station is located on an open cut at Huguenot Avenue and has two side platforms. There is a steel and concrete canopy over the platforms at the stairs and an additional canopy is located about halfway down the northbound platform, features used as part of SIR station upgrades and platform extensions in the 1990s. Some morning rush hour local trains originate here; a pair of switches south of the station are used to reverse the direction of these trains. A spur used for ballast trains branches off the southbound track across Huguenot Avenue from the station entrance. This stop provides access to the nearby Tottenville High School.

Ground	Street level	Station house, exit/entrance, buses, parking
Platform level	Side platform
Platform level	Southbound	← toward Tottenville (Prince's Bay)
Platform level	Northbound	toward St. George (Annadale) →
Platform level	Side platform

=== Exit ===
There are exit stairs at the south end, and a brick stationhouse built in 1939 on street level. A pedestrian overpass formerly existed at the north end. The MTA runs a park & ride lot at the station.
