= Blue Heron Park =

Nature refuge in Staten Island, New York

Coordinates: 40°31′53.21″N 74°10′28.64″W

Blue Heron Park is a nature refuge on the South Shore of Staten Island, New York. It has various natural areas including meadows, kettle ponds, freshwater streams and marshes, and woodlands. The park, maintained by the New York City Department of Parks and Recreation, was acquired by the city in several parcels between 1974 and 2001, with the official dedication taking place on October 22, 1996.

The extensive wetlands in the park are part of the Blue Belt, an area of Staten Island which utilizes existing and improved undeveloped areas for storm water drainage. There are six ponds located within the park including the 1.75-acre (7,100 m^{2}) Spring Pond and the 1.4-acre (5,700 m^{2}) Blue Heron Pond

The park provides habitat to various species of birds including the Blue heron (Ardea herodias) for which it was named as well as various species of mammals such as bats, raccoons, grey squirrels and chipmunks.

The visitors center for the park located off Poillon Ave, is the starting point for three trails which traverse different areas of the park.

== Flora ==
American sweet gum (Liquidambar styraciflua), tulip tree (liriodendron tulipifera), Red columbine (Aquilegia canadensis), Black-eyed Susan (Rudbeckia hirta) and Jack-in-the-pulpit (Arisaema triphyllum) white water lilies (Nymphaea odorata).

== Fauna ==
Glossy ibis (Plegadis falcinellus), wood duck (Aix sponsa), osprey (Pandion haliaetus), black-crowned night heron (Nycticorax nycticorax), Spring peepers (Pseudacris crucifer), tree frogs (Hylidae), raccoon (Procyon lotor)
