= Annadale station =

Staten Island Railway station

Annadale
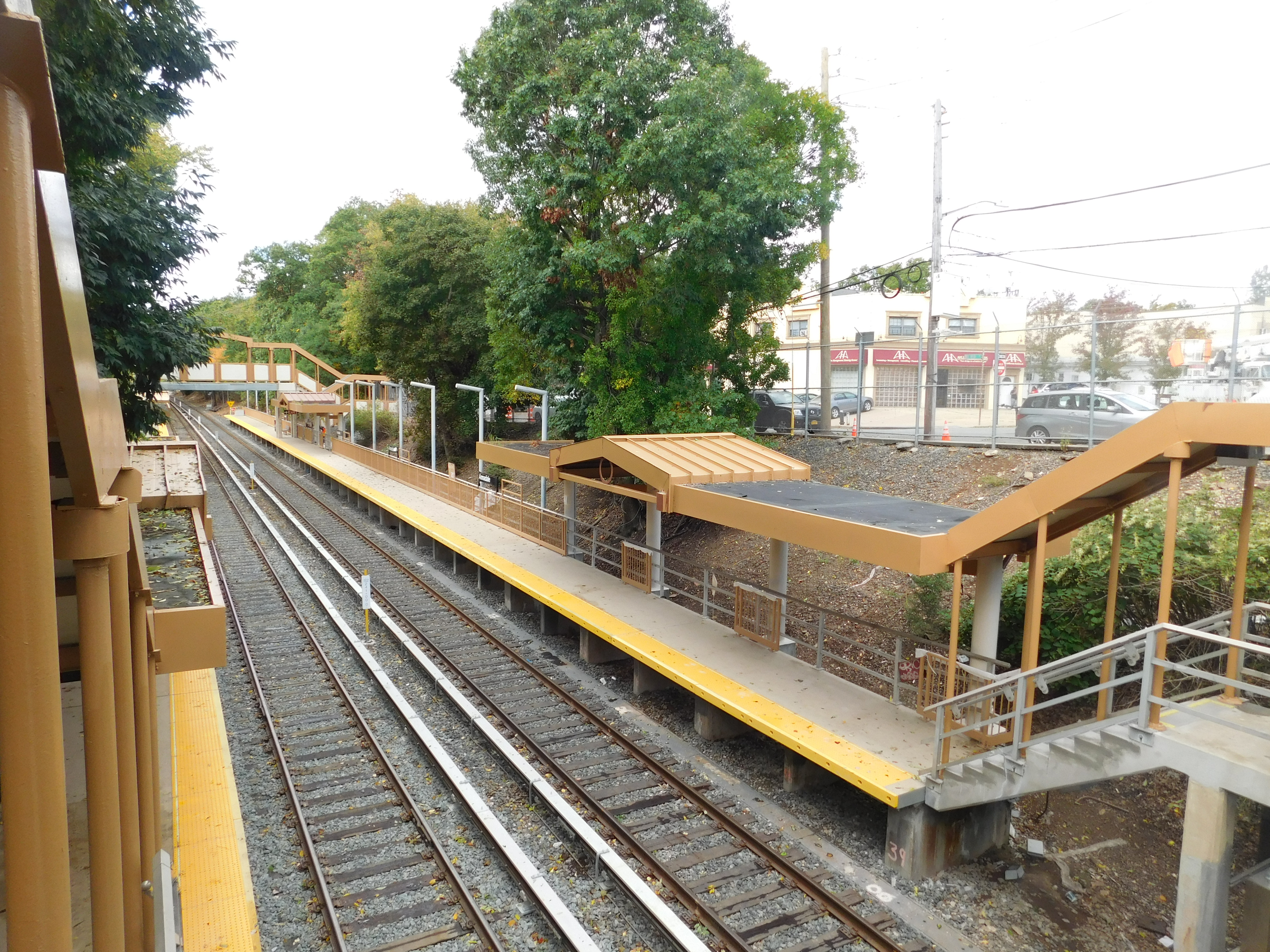
- Annadale station in September 2020

General information
- Location: Annadale Road and Sneden Avenue; Annadale, Staten Island
- Coordinates: 40.54043°N 74.17840°W
- Platforms: 2 side platforms
- Tracks: 2
- Connections: NYCT Bus: S55

Construction
- Structure type: Open-cut

Other information
- Station code: 515

History
- Opened: May 14, 1860; 166 years ago
- Rebuilt: November 18, 1910; 1939; 1990s

Services
Preceding station	Staten Island Railway	Following station
Eltingville toward St. George	Staten Island Railway	Huguenot toward Tottenville

Former services
Preceding station	Staten Island Railway	Following station
Woods of Arden toward St. George	Tottenville – St. George	Ocean Park toward Tottenville
Track layout
Location

The Annadale station is a Staten Island Railway station in the neighborhood of Annadale, Staten Island, New York.

== History ==
Annadale opened on May 14, 1860, when the Staten Island Railway was extended from Eltingville, one stop to the north. The original station building was replaced in 1910, moved a short distance, expanded into a residence, and finally moved to Historic Richmond Town in 1975.

The 1910 station was rebuilt in 1939 as part of a grade crossing elimination project. The station was rehabilitated in the 1990s as part of an SIR-wide upgrade/platform lengthening project. The St. George bound staircase on Annadale Road at this station has been closed for renovations from April 9, 2024 to May 7, 2024 due to scheduled maintenance.

== Station layout ==
The station is located in a shallow open cut at Annadale Road and Sneden Avenue on the main line. It has two side platforms and light orange color walls and tiles.

Mezzanine	Overpass	Exit/entrance, connection between platforms
Ground	Street level	Station house, exit/entrance, buses, parking
Platform level	Side platform
Platform level	Southbound	← toward Tottenville (Huguenot)
Platform level	Northbound	toward St. George (Eltingville) →
Platform level	Side platform

=== Exits ===
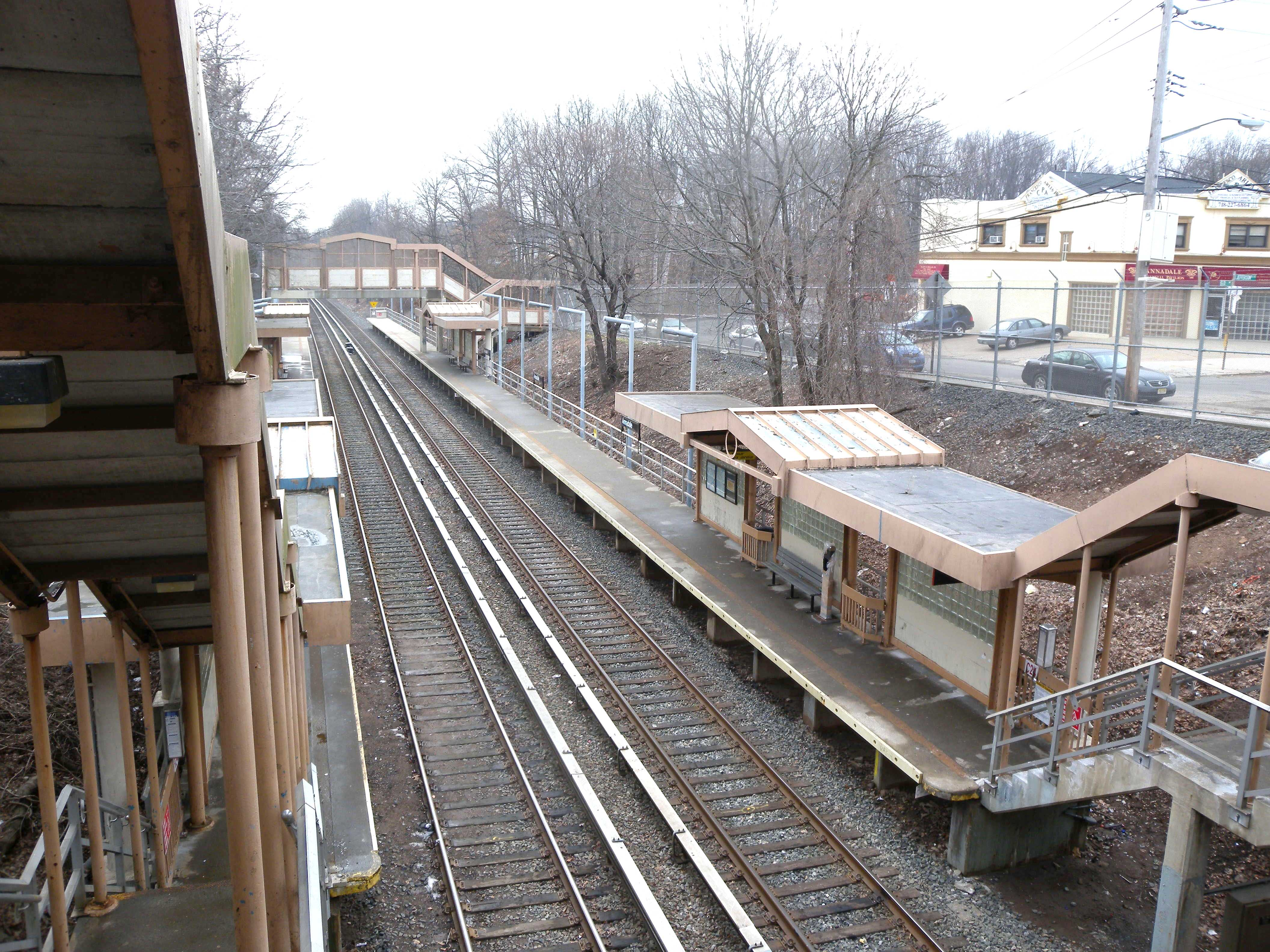
Southbound platform

The north end has a street-level brick stationhouse at Annadale Road, while the south end, next to Belfield Avenue, has an overpass and stairs to each platform. On the northbound side, there is a second set of stairs that leads to an adjacent parking lot near Tenafly Avenue, operated by the MTA as a park and ride facility.
