= Staten Island Railway =

Rapid transit line in New York City

- The SIR bullet, used on the MTA's website, timetables, New York City Subway map, and some station signage

- An SIR train of R211S cars

Overview
- Owner: Staten Island Rapid Transit Operating Authority (SIRTOA), a subsidiary of the Metropolitan Transportation Authority
- Locale: Staten Island, New York City
- Transit type: Rapid transit
- Number of lines: 1
- Number of stations: 21
- Daily ridership: 21,000 (weekdays, Q2 2026)
- Annual ridership: 5,437,400 (2025)
- Key people: Demetrius Crichlow, President; Lisa Schreibman, Senior Vice President
- Headquarters: 845 Bay Street, Staten Island, New York
- Website: mta.info/sir

Operation
- Began operation: February 1, 1860; 166 years ago
- Operator: New York City Transit Authority Department of Subways
- Number of vehicles: R44 (44 cars; contingency fleet) R211S (75 cars)

Technical
- System length: 14 mi (22.5 km)
- Track gauge: 4 ft 8 1/2 in (1,435 mm) standard gauge
- Electrification: Third rail, 600 V DC
- Top speed: 45 mph (72 km/h)

The Staten Island Railway (SIR) is a rapid transit line in the New York City borough of Staten Island. It is owned by the Staten Island Rapid Transit Operating Authority (SIRTOA), a subsidiary of the Metropolitan Transportation Authority, and operated by the New York City Transit Authority Department of Subways. SIR's only line operates 24 hours a day, seven days a week, providing local service between St. George and Tottenville, along the east side of Staten Island. There is no direct rail link between the SIR and the New York City Subway system, but SIR riders do receive a free transfer to New York City Transit bus and subway lines and the line is included on official New York City Subway maps. Commuters on the railway typically use the Staten Island Ferry to reach Manhattan. The line is accessible from within the Ferry Terminal, and most of its trains are timed to connect with the ferry. In 2025, the system had a ridership of 5,437,400, or about 21,000 per weekday as of the second quarter of 2026.

The railroad was incorporated in 1851 and was completed to Tottenville on June 2, 1860, as the Staten Island Rail Road. It was reorganized into the Staten Island Railway Company in 1873. During the late 19th and early 20th centuries, it was operated successively by the Baltimore and Ohio Railroad and then the Pennsylvania Railroad. Under these companies' control, the SIR formerly operated two other branches for passenger trains: the North Shore Branch from 1886 to 1953 and the South Beach Branch from 1888 to 1953. SIRTOA was formed as subsidiary public benefit corporation in 1970 and took over operation of the Tottenville line in 1971 when it was purchased by the city of New York. The MTA rebranded the Staten Island Rapid Transit as the MTA Staten Island Railway in 1994.

The line has a route bullet similar to subway routes: the letters SIR in a blue circle. The line is one of the few 24/7 mass-transit rail systems in the United States. (Note: The others are the PATCO Speedline, the Red and Blue Lines of the Chicago "L", and the PATH system.) Although the railway was originally considered a standard rail line, the existing line is severed from the national rail system, and only a small portion of the former North Shore Branch still sees freight use. The passenger operations are regulated as a rapid transit system and exempt from some regulations. The line uses R211S subway cars, but uses R44s as a contingency fleet.

The railroad's main base of operations are at the Clifton Shops, located adjacent to the Clifton station that was once the original terminal of the railway.

== History ==
=== 19th century ===
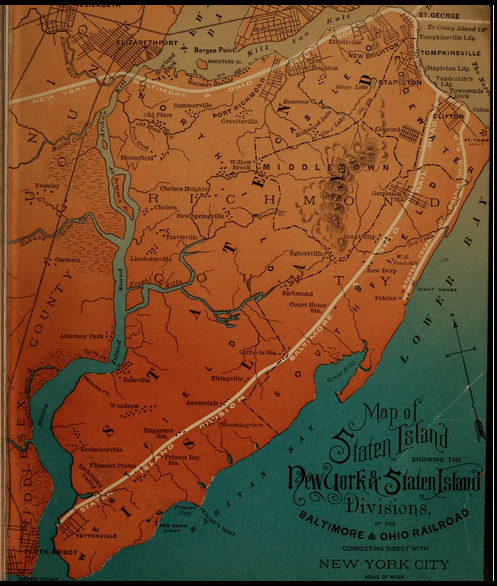
1885 Staten Island Rapid Transit Company map

The Staten Island Rail Road was incorporated on August 2, 1851, after Perth Amboy and Staten Island residents petitioned for a Tottenville-to-Stapleton rail line. The railroad was financed with a loan from Cornelius Vanderbilt, the sole Staten Island-to-Manhattan ferry operator on the East Shore, his first involvement in a railroad. The line was completed to Tottenville on June 2, 1860. Under the leadership of Vanderbilt's brother, Jacob H. Vanderbilt, the Staten Island Rail Road took over several independent ferries. The Staten Island Railway and ferry line made a modest profit until the explosion of the ferry Westfield at Whitehall Street Terminal on July 30, 1871. By July 1872, the railroad and ferry were in receivership. On September 17, 1872, the company was sold to George Law in foreclosure. The following April 1, the Staten Island Rail Road was transferred to the Staten Island Railway Company.

By 1880 the railway was barely operational, and New York State sued (through Attorney General Hamilton Ward) to dissolve the company in May of that year. Erastus Wiman, one of the island's most prominent residents, organized the Staten Island Rapid Transit Company (SIRT) on March 25, 1880, and partnered with the Baltimore & Ohio Railroad (B&O) to build a large rail terminal on the island and centralize the six-to-eight ferry landings. He secured an extension on a land-purchase option from George Law by offering to name it "St. George" after him.

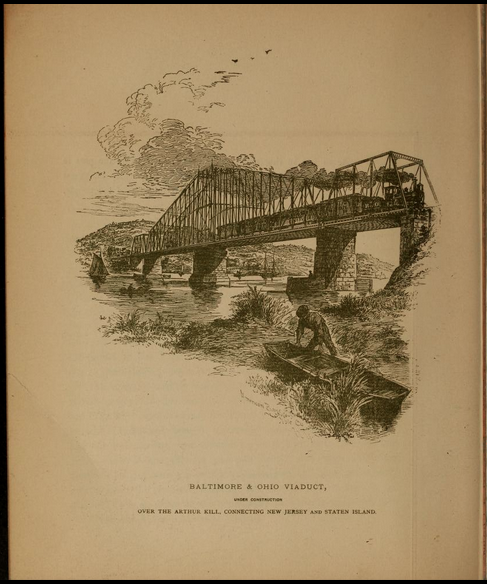
1885 drawing of the Baltimore & Ohio viaduct (under construction) over Arthur Kill, between Staten Island and New Jersey

Construction of the Vanderbilt's Landing-to-Tompkinsville portion of the North Shore Branch began on March 17, 1884, and the line opened for passenger service on August 1 of that year. The lighthouse just above Tompkinsville impeded the line's extension to St. George but, after the SIRT lobbied for an act of Congress, construction of a two-track, 580-foot (180 m) tunnel under the lighthouse began in 1885 for about $190,000. The SIR was leased to the B&O for 99 years in 1885. Proceeds of the lease were used to complete the terminal at Saint George, pay for two miles of waterfront property, complete the Rapid Transit Railroad, build a bridge over the Kill Van Kull at Elizabethport, and build other terminal facilities. The North Shore Branch opened for service on February 23, 1886, to Elm Park. The Saint George terminal opened on March 7, 1886, and all SIR lines were extended to the station. The remainder of the North Shore Branch, to its terminus at Erastina, was opened in the summer of 1886. On January 1, 1888, the South Beach Branch opened for passenger service to Arrochar. In 1893, the South Beach Branch was extended from Arrochar to a new terminal at South Beach. The new lines opened by the B&O were known as the Staten Island Rapid Transit Railway, and the original line (from Clifton to Tottenville) was called the Staten Island Railway.

In 1886, Congress passed a law authorizing the construction of a 500-foot (150 m) swing bridge over Arthur Kill, after three years of effort by Wiman. The bridge was completed three days early, on June 13, 1888, at 3 p.m. The Arthur Kill Bridge was the world's largest drawbridge when it opened, and there were no fatalities in its construction. In 1889, construction began on the Baltimore and New York Railway—a 5.25-mile (8.45 km) line from Arthur Kill to the Jersey Central at Cranford, and was finished later in the year. On January 1, 1890, the first train operated from St. George Terminal to Cranford Junction. When the Arthur Kill Bridge was completed, the United States War Department was unsuccessfully pressured by the Lehigh Valley and Pennsylvania Railroads to have the newly built bridge replaced with a bridge with a different design; according to the railroads, it was an obstruction to navigation of the large numbers of coal barges past Holland Hook on Arthur Kill. In 1897, the terminal at Saint George (which served the railroad and the ferry to Manhattan) was completed.

=== 20th century ===
Improvements were made to the SIRT after the Pennsylvania Railroad (PRR) took control of the B&O in 1900. On October 25, 1905, New York City took ownership of the ferry and terminals and evicted the B&O from the Whitehall Street terminal. The St. George Terminal was then built by the city for $2,318,720, equivalent to $83,087,467 in 2025.

In anticipation of a tunnel under the Narrows to Brooklyn and a connection there with the BMT Fourth Avenue Line of the New York City Subway, the SIRT electrified its lines with third rail power distribution and cars similar to those of the Brooklyn–Manhattan Transit Corporation (BMT). The first electric train was operated on the South Beach Branch between South Beach and Fort Wadsworth on May 30, 1925, and the other branches were electrified by November of that year. Electrification did not greatly increase traffic, and the tunnel was never built. During the 1920s, a branch line along Staten Island's West Shore was built to haul building materials for the Outerbridge Crossing. The branch was cut back to a point south of the crossing after the bridge was built. The Gulf Oil Corporation opened a dock and tank farm along Arthur Kill in 1928; to serve it, the Travis Branch was built south from Arlington Yard into the marshes of the island's western shore to Gulfport in the early 1930s.

The Port Richmond–Tower Hill viaduct, the nation's largest grade-crossing-elimination project, was completed on February 25, 1937. The viaduct, more than a mile long, spanned eight grade crossings on the SIRT's North Shore Branch and was the final part of a $6 million grade-crossing-elimination project on the island which eliminated thirty-four crossings on its north and south shores.

Revenue-passenger traffic, in millions of passenger miles
Year	Traffic
1925	67
1944	81
1960	37
1967	38

Freight and World War II traffic helped pay some of the SIRT's accumulated debt, and the line was briefly profitable in the 1940s. All East Coast military-hospital trains were handled by the SIRT during the war, and some trains stopped at Staten Island's Arlington station to transfer wounded soldiers to a large military hospital. The need to transport war materiel, POW trains and troops made the stretch of the Baltimore & New York Railway between Cranford Junction and Arthur Kill extremely busy. The B&O also operated special trains for important officials, such as Winston Churchill. On June 25, 1946, a fire destroyed the St. George Terminal; three people were killed, twenty-two were injured and damage totaled $22 million. The fire destroyed the ferry terminal, the four slips used for service to Manhattan and the SIRT terminal. Normal service was not restored until July 13, 1946, and a request for bids to build a temporary terminal was issued on August 21 of that year. On February 10, 1948, a replacement terminal was promised by Mayor William O'Dwyer. The new $23 million terminal opened on June 8, 1951, with ferry, bus and rail service in one building; portions of the new terminal were phased into service earlier.

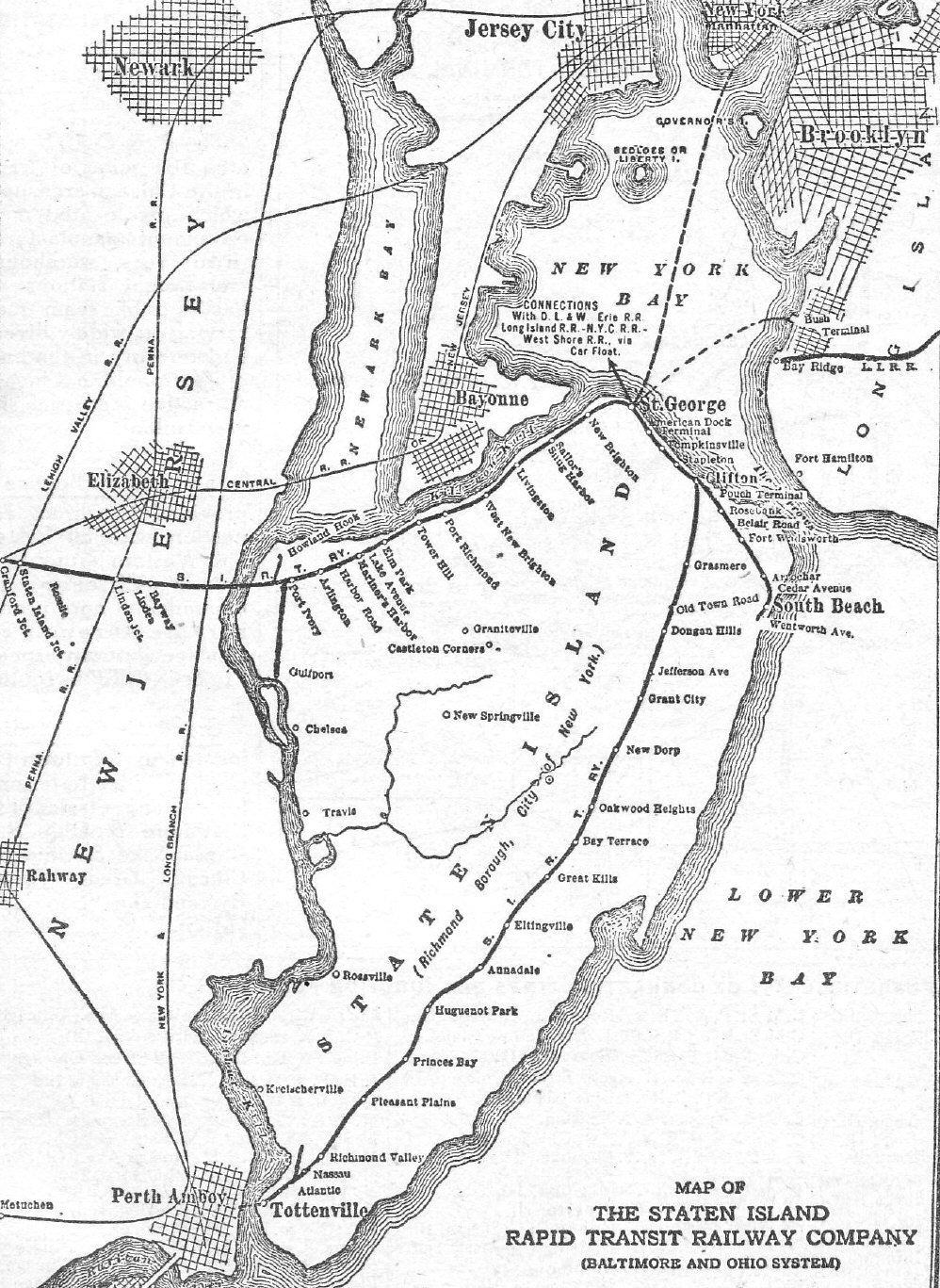
1952 Staten Island Rapid Transit map, with freight connections

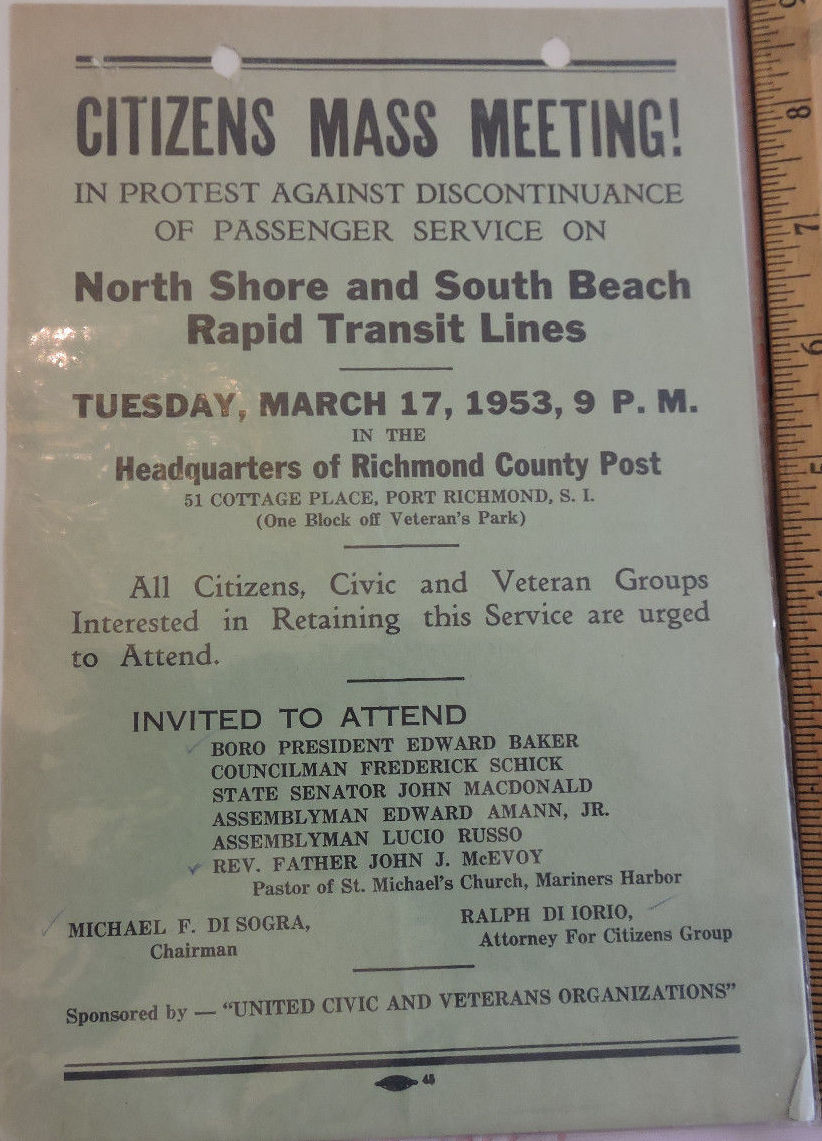
Poster publicizing a March 1953 meeting protesting SIRT cuts

Ridership decreased from 12.3 million in 1947 to 4.4 million in 1949 as passengers switched from the rail line to city-operated buses due to a bus-fare reduction. In September 1948, about half of weekday trains were cut, night trains after 1:29 a.m. were cancelled, and thirty percent of the company's employees were laid off. After backlash, service was slightly increased. On September 22, the Interstate Commerce Commission allowed the SIRT to abandon the ferry it had operated for 88 years between Tottenville and Perth Amboy, New Jersey, and the ferry operation was transferred to Sunrise Ferries of Elizabeth, New Jersey on October 16. SIRT discontinued passenger service on the North Shore Branch and the South Beach Branch at midnight on March 31, 1953, due to competition from city-operated buses; the South Beach Branch was abandoned shortly afterwards, and the North Shore Branch continued to carry freight. On September 7, 1954, SIRT applied to discontinue passenger service on the Tottenville Branch on October 7 of that year; a large city subsidy allowed passenger service on the branch to continue.

In 1956, work began on the replacement of the Arthur Kill swing bridge by a single-track, 558-foot (170 m) vertical-lift bridge, which opened in August 1959. The prefabricated, 2,000-ton bridge was floated into place. The new bridge could rise 135 feet (41 m) and, since it aided navigation on Arthur Kill, the federal government assumed 90% of the project's $11 million cost. Freight trains started crossing the bridge when it opened on August 25, 1959. The Travis Branch was extended in 1958 to a new Consolidated Edison power plant in Travis (on the West Shore), allowing coal trains from West Virginia to serve the plant.

Operation of the Tottenville line was turned over to the Staten Island Rapid Transit Operating Authority (a division of the state's Metropolitan Transportation Authority) on July 1, 1971, and the line was purchased by the city of New York. As part of the agreement, freight on the line would continue to be handled by the B&O under the Staten Island Railroad. The first six R44 cars (the same as the newest cars then in use on the subway lines in the other boroughs) were put into SIRT service on February 28, 1973, replacing the ME-1 cars which had been in service since 1925. Between 1971 and 1973, a project began to extend the high-level platforms at six stations. A station-rebuilding program began in 1985, and the line's R44s were overhauled starting in 1987.

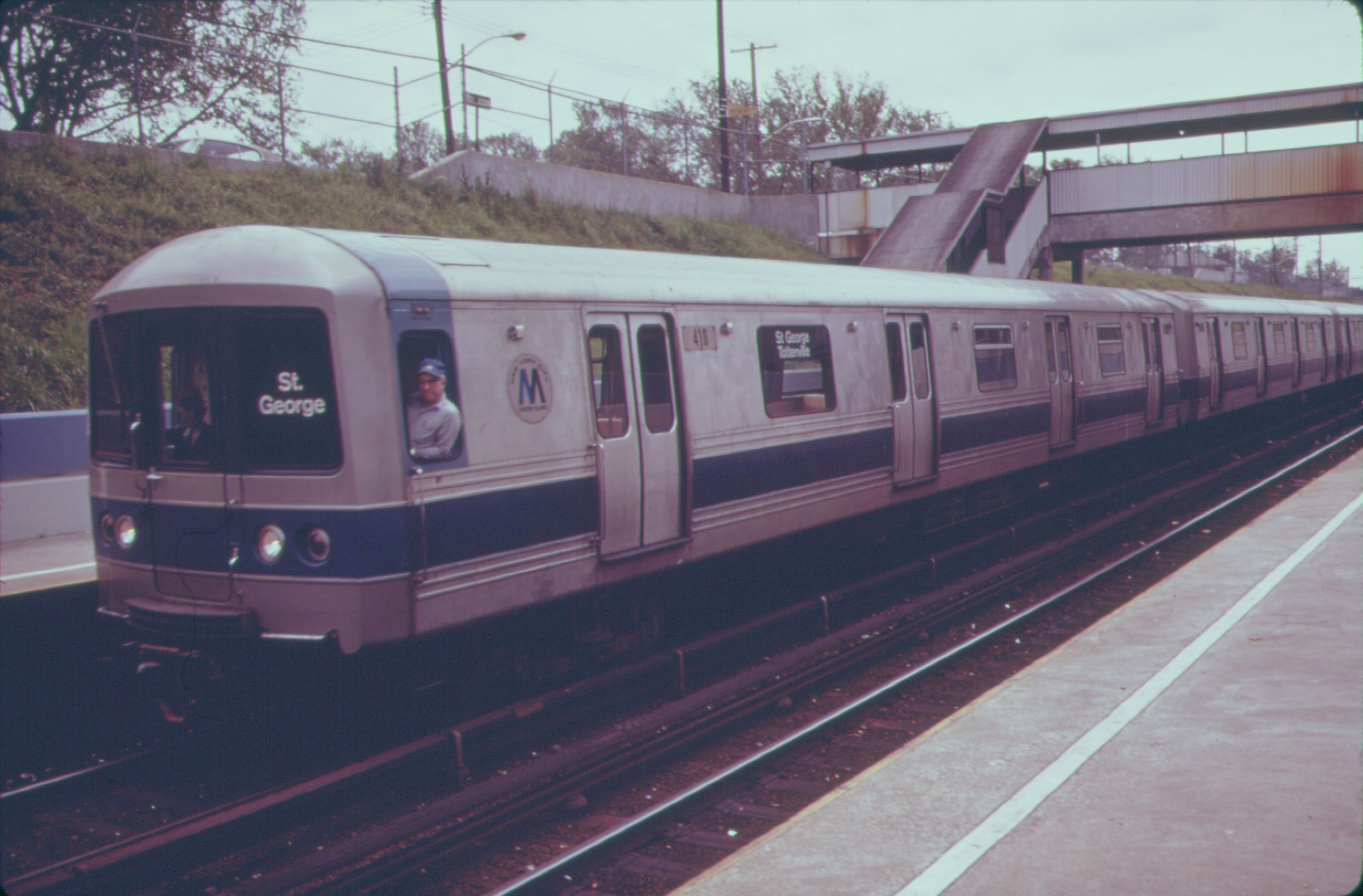
An R44 at Grant City heading to St. George in July 1973

The B&O became part of the larger Chessie System in a merger with the Chesapeake and Ohio Railway (C&O), and the island's freight operation was renamed the Staten Island Railroad Corporation in 1971. The B&O and C&O became isolated from their other properties in New Jersey and Staten Island with the creation of Conrail on April 1, 1976, in a merger of bankrupt lines in the northeastern U.S. Their freight service now terminated in Philadelphia, but for several years afterward B&O locomotives and one B&O freight train a day ran to Cranford Junction. In 1973, the Jersey Central's car float yard was closed; however, the B&O's car-float operation was later brought back to Staten Island at Saint George Yard, after having ended in September 1976. This car-float operation was taken over by the New York Dock Railway in September 1979, and ended the following year.

Only a few isolated industries on Staten Island continued to use rail services, and the yard at Saint George was essentially abandoned. In April 1985, as a result of a decline in freight traffic, the Chessie System sold the Staten Island Railway to the New York, Susquehanna and Western Railway (NYS&W), a Delaware Otsego (DO) subsidiary, for $1.5 million via a promissory note payable for over ten years. The NYS&W subsequently retained the Staten Island's freight operations, which served only ten customers by that time, and they had hopes of attracting more to boost profitability on the line. In 1989, the NYS&W embargoed the trackage east of Elm Park on the North Shore Branch, ending all freight service to Saint George.

Procter & Gamble, the line's primary customer, closed in 1990, resulting in a further decline in freight traffic. On July 25, 1991, the Arthur Kill Bridge was removed from service, and the line's final freight train operated on April 21, 1992. The North Shore Branch and the Arthur Kill Bridge were then taken over by Chessie's successor, CSX Transportation (CSX). The line and bridge were sold again in 1994 to the New York City Economic Development Corporation (NYCEDC), followed by a decade of false starts.

SIRT was transferred from the New York City Transit Authority's Surface Transit Division to its Department of Rapid Transit on July 26, 1993, and that year the Dongan Hills station became accessible, making it compliant with the Americans with Disabilities Act of 1990. MetroCards were accepted for fare payment at the St. George station beginning on March 31, 1994, and the station became the 50th MTA rapid transit station to accept them. The Metropolitan Transportation Authority (MTA) restored the line's original name on April 2 of that year as the MTA Staten Island Railway (SIR). On July 4, 1997, the MTA eliminated fares for travel between Tompkinsville and Tottenville as part of the year's "One City, One Fare" fare reductions. United Transportation Union Local 1440, the union representing SIR employees, was concerned about the fare reduction in part because of an expected increase in ridership. No turnstiles were installed at the other stations on the line, and passengers at St. George began paying when entering and exiting; fares had previously been collected on board by the conductor. The removal of fares was blamed for an immediate spike in crime along the line. Three afternoon express trains were added to the schedule on April 7, 1999, nearly doubling the previous express service. The express trains skipped stops between St. George and Great Kills. A several-hundred-foot section of the easternmost portion of the North Shore Branch was reopened for passenger service to the Richmond County Bank Ballpark, home of the Staten Island Yankees minor-league baseball team, on June 24, 2001; the service was discontinued on June 18, 2010. A new station building at Tompkinsville opened on January 20, 2010, with turnstiles installed to prevent passengers from exiting (free of charge) at Tompkinsville and walking the short distance to the St. George ferry terminal.

In the 2010s, elected officials on Staten Island, including State Senator Diane Savino, demanded the replacement of the railway's aging R44 cars. Although the Metropolitan Transportation Authority initially planned to order R179s for the Staten Island Railway, it was later decided to overhaul R46s to replace the R44s. However, the R46 overhaul plan was also dropped, and 75 R211S cars were ordered to replace the R44s. The first R211S cars entered service in October 2024, fully replacing the R44s by September 2025.

== Current use ==
=== Passenger service ===
Although the Staten Island Railway originally consisted of three lines, only the north-south Main Line is in passenger service. It has been grade-separated from all roads since the 1960s, but runs more or less at street level for a brief stretch north of Clifton, between the Grasmere and Old Town stations, and from south of the Pleasant Plains station to Tottenville—the end of the line. The terminus at St. George provides a direct connection with the Staten Island Ferry. St. George has twelve tracks, ten of which are in service. Tottenville has a three-track yard to the east of the station, which itself has two tracks and an island platform.

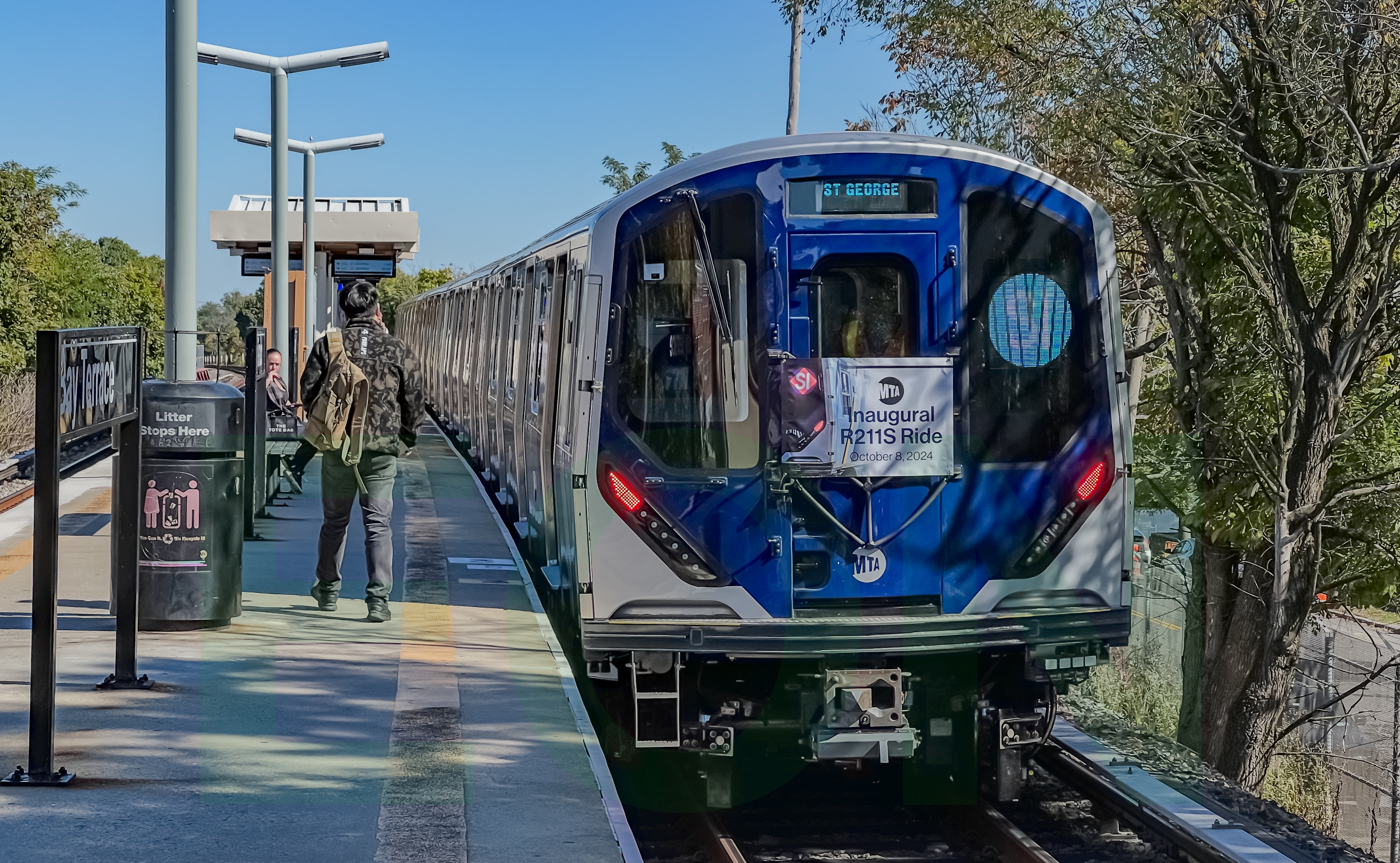
R211S train at Bay Terrace during its first day of service

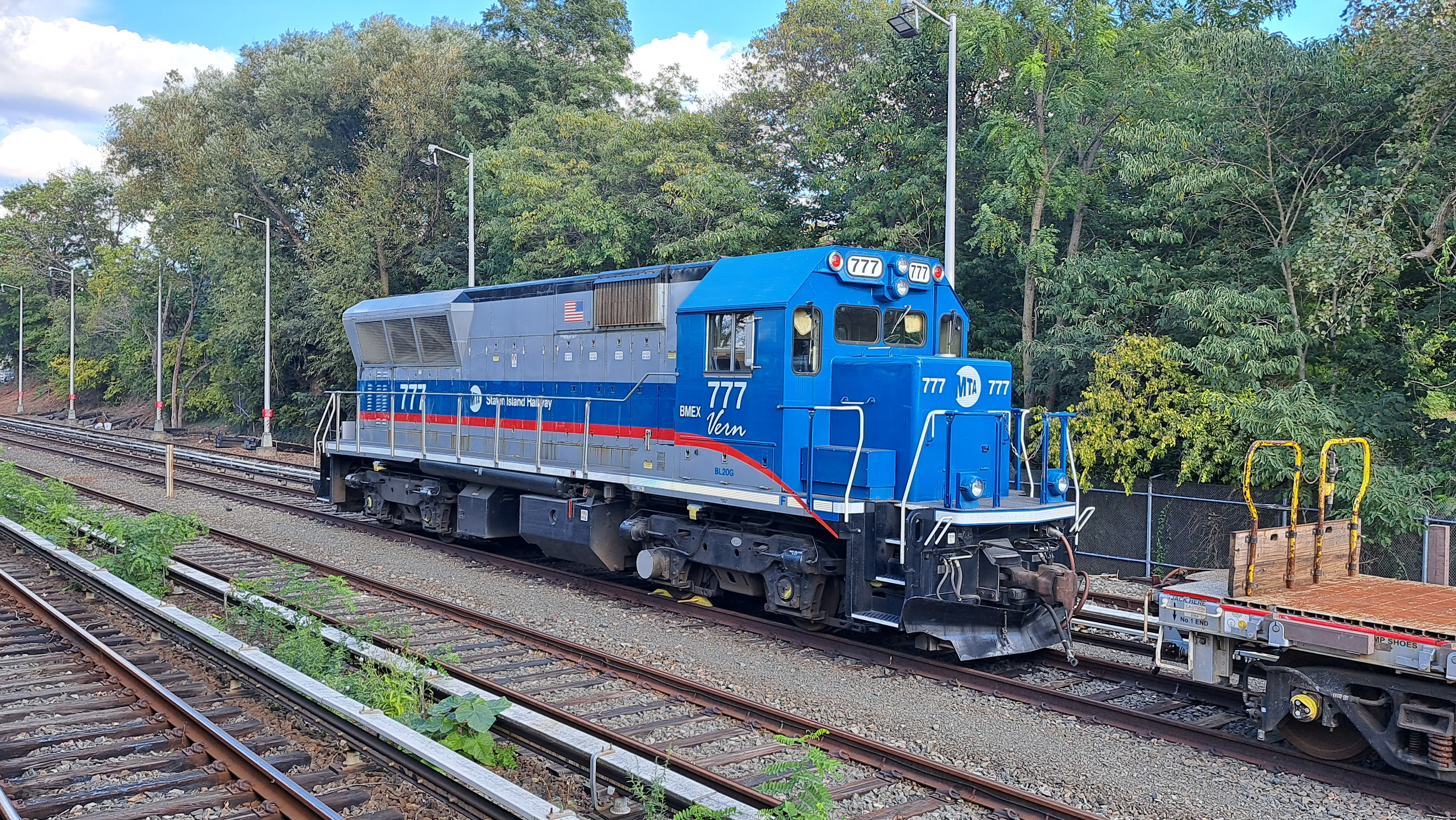
BL20G #777 at Tottenville

Rolling stock consists of seventy-five R211S subway cars manufactured by Kawasaki Railcar Manufacturing. The first R211S cars entered service on October 8, 2024, and the final cars were placed into service less than a year later in September 2025. The line also has four BL20G locomotives manufactured by Brookville, which were delivered in 2009 and are used for work service. Heavy maintenance is performed at NYCT's Clifton Shops, and any work unable to be done at Clifton requires the cars to be trucked over the Verrazzano–Narrows Bridge to the subway's Coney Island Complex in Brooklyn. The right-of-way includes elevated, embankment and open-cut sections, as well as a tunnel near St. George. Prior to 2025, the Staten Island Railway used modified R44 subway-type cars built in early 1973, added to the end of the R44 order of subway cars for New York City Transit; they were the last cars built by the St. Louis Car Company. The R44s themselves replaced the ME-1 rolling stock inherited from the B&O that had remained in continuous service since 1925 when the system was electrified.

The Staten Island Railway uses Baltimore & Ohio Railroad-style color position light signals dating back to its B&O days. In 2007, a $72-million project to enhance the old signal system was completed. The Signaling system was enhanced with an FRA-compliant 100 Hz, track-circuit-based automatic train control (ATC) signal system. As part of the project, forty R44 subway cars and four locomotives were modified with onboard cab signaling equipment for ATC bi-directional movement. A new rail control center and backup control center were built as part of the project. The line uses NYC Transit-standard 600 V DC third-rail power. Trains run up to 45 miles per hour (72 km/h) in passenger service, although trains are limited to 10 miles per hour (16 km/h) on tail tracks, sidings and in yards.

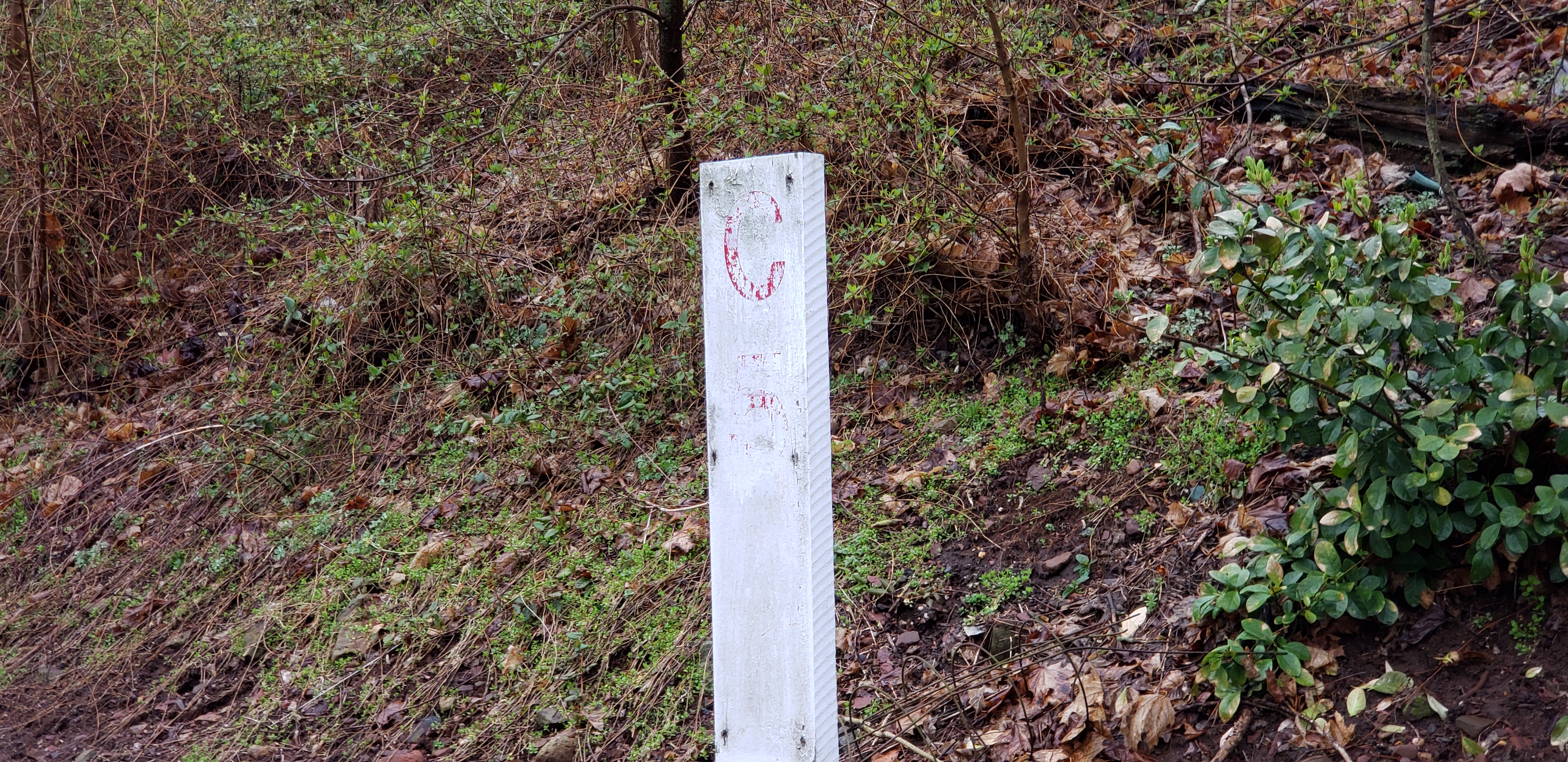
Disused Conductor indicator for a 5-car train at Grant City. Used during 5-car train tests in the early 2010s. By 2019, almost all of these had been removed, as the SIRTOA continued to use 4-car trains.

Demetrius Crichlow has been the railway's president and chief officer since his appointment in October 2024. The workforce, about 200 hourly employees, is represented by United Transportation Union Local 1440.

==== Accessibility ====
Only the Dongan Hills, St. George, Great Kills, New Dorp, and Tottenville stations have been renovated to comply with the Americans with Disabilities Act of 1990; these stations have elevators and/or ramps. As part of the MTA's 2020–2024 capital plan, two additional stations are planned to be renovated to become ADA-accessible, Huguenot and Clifton.

The Prince's Bay, Huguenot, Annadale, Great Kills, Dongan Hills, and Arthur Kill stations have park-and-ride facilities. The newest station on the Staten Island Railway, Arthur Kill, opened on January 21, 2017, and is ADA-compliant. The station is between (and has replaced) the now-demolished Atlantic and Nassau stations, which were in the poorest condition of all the stations on the line.

==== Police ====
On June 1, 2005, the Staten Island Rapid Transit Police Department was disbanded and its 25 railroad police officers became part of the Metropolitan Transportation Authority Police Department. The MTA Police Department was created in 1998 with the merger of the Long Island Rail Road Police Department and the Metro-North Railroad Police Department. The MTA Police Department then opened its newest patrol district, Police District #9, which began covering the Staten Island Railway.

==== Fare ====
As of January 2026, the fare is $3, the same fare as the New York City Subway and MTA buses. Fares are paid on entry and exit only at St. George and Tompkinsville. Rides not originating or terminating at St. George or Tompkinsville are free. Fares are payable by OMNY, and MetroCards with remaining balance are also accepted. Since these fare media enable free transfers for a continuous ride on the subway and bus systems, for many riders there is effectively no fare for riding the SIR, as long as they do not need to make a second transfer. Riders can also transfer between a Staten Island bus, the SIR and a Manhattan bus (or subway) near South Ferry. Because of this, the SIR's 2001 farebox recovery ratio was 0.16; for every dollar of expense, 16 cents was recovered in fares (the lowest ratio of MTA agencies). The low farebox recovery ratio is part of the reason the MTA sought to merge the SIR with the subway to form MTA Subways in October 2002: to simplify accounting and subsidy of a single line.

Before the 1997 introduction of the one-fare zone, with the MetroCard's free transfers from the SIR to the subway system and MTA buses, fares were collected from passengers boarding at stops other than St. George by onboard conductors. In the past, passengers had avoided paying the fare by exiting at Tompkinsville and walking a short distance to the St. George Ferry Terminal. As a result, the MTA installed turnstiles at Tompkinsville and a new station building, which opened on January 20, 2010.

On October 23, 2017, it was announced that the MetroCard would be phased out and replaced by OMNY, a contactless fare payment system also by Cubic, with fare payment being made using Apple Pay, Google Pay, debit/credit cards with near-field communication technology, or radio-frequency identification cards. The St. George and Tompkinsville stations, the only two Staten Island Railway stations with turnstiles, received OMNY readers in December 2019. MetroCard sales ended December 31, 2025, although existing MetroCards could continue to be used until their balance was depleted or the card expired.

=== Freight service ===
During the early 2000s, plans to reopen the Staten Island Rapid Transit line in New Jersey were announced by the Port Authority of New York and New Jersey (PANYNJ). Since the Central Railroad of New Jersey became a New Jersey Transit line, a new junction would be built to the former Lehigh Valley Railroad. So all New England and southern freight could pass through the New York metropolitan area, two rail tunnels from Brooklyn (one to Staten Island and the other to Greenville, New Jersey) were planned.

On December 15, 2004, a $72 million project to reactivate freight service on Staten Island and repair the Arthur Kill Vertical Lift Bridge was announced by the NYCEDC and the PANYNJ. Projects on the Arthur Kill Bridge included repainting the steel superstructure and rehabilitating its lift mechanism. In 2006, the freight line connection reopened from New Jersey to the Staten Island Railroad, including the Arthur Kill Bridge. Regular service began on April 2, 2007 (16 years after it had closed) to ship container freight from the Howland Hook Marine Terminal and other industrial businesses. The service at the marine terminal is part of the PANYNJ's ExpressRail system completed with of the single-track Chemical Coast connector. Service is provided by and Conrail Shared Assets Operations (CRCX) for its co-owners, CSX, Norfolk Southern Railway.

As part of the project, a portion of the North Shore Branch was rehabilitated, the Arlington Yard was expanded, and 6,500 feet (1,981 m) of new track was laid along the Travis Branch to Staten Island Transfer Station at Fresh Kills. Soon after service restarted on the line, Mayor Michael Bloomberg officially commemorated the reactivation on April 17, 2007. As of 2019, the New York City Department of Sanitation's contractor was moving containers of municipal solid waste by barge from Queens and Manhattan to the Howland Hook Marine Terminal for transfer to rail there.

Along the remainder of the North Shore Branch, there are still tracks and rail overpasses in some places.

== Future plans ==
Annual passenger ridership
Year	Passengers	%±
1860	63,641	—
1870	336,706	+429.1%
1880	390,151	+15.9%
1890	6,539,318	+1576.1%
1900	4,439,506	-32.1%
1901	4,212,303	-5.1%
1902	4,238,630	+21.9%
1903	4,302,858	+2.1%
1904	4,586,182	+6.6%
1905	4,724,041	+3.0%
1906	5,161,134	+9.3%
1907	5,944,696	+15.2%
1908	5,649,116	−5.0%
1909	5,237,373	−7.3%
1910	6,014,928	+14.8%
1911	6,218,316	+3.4%
1912	6,461,635	+3.9%
1913	6,636,336	+2.7%
1914	6,979,126	+5.1%
1915	6,943,302	-0.5%
1916	7,563,066	+8.9%
1917	8,378,779	+10.8%
1918	9,269,902	+10.6%
1919	10,204,511	+10.1%
1920	13,011,958	+27.5%
1921	11,181,785	-14.1%
1922	10,686,439	-4.4%
1923	11,130,382	+4.2%
1924	11,828,314	+6.3%
1925	12,443,909	+5.2%
1926	13,000,311	+4.5%
1927	13,384,913	+3.0%
1928	13,569,054	+1.4%
1929	14,783,080	+9.0%
1930	14,318,178	-3.1%
1931	12,999,636	-9.2%
1932	10,892,762	-16.2%
1933	9,710,103	-10.9%
1934	9,129,112	-6.0%
1935	8,757,275	-4.1%
1936	9,422,276	+7.6%
1937	8,735,704	+7.3%
1938	8,933,096	+2.3%
1939	8,636,683	-3.3%
1945	14,811,466	+71.5%
1946	13,578,376	-8.3%
1947	12,295,221	-9.4%
1948	8,696,218	-29.3%
1949	4,424,410	-49.1%
1950	3,878,071	-12.3%
1951	3,984,476	+2.7%
1964	6,400,000	+60.6%
1965	5,700,000	-10.9%
1968	5,330,000	-6.5%
1969	5,240,000	+2.7%
1970	4,760,000	-19.5%
1971	4,720,000	-0.8%
1972	4,100,000	-13.1%
1986	6,470,000	+57.8%
1988	6,230,000	-3.7%
1995	5,100,000	-18.1%
1996	4,900,000	-3.9%
1997	4,600,000	-6.1%
1998	4,108,000	-10.7%
1999	3,946,242	-3.9%
2000	4,088,000	+3.6%
2001	3,963,590	-3.0%
2002	3,594,677	-9.3%
2017	4,600,000	+28%
2022	2,009,000	-56%

There has been discussion of building an in-fill station in the Rosebank neighborhood, which would bridge the longest gap between two stations (Grasmere and Clifton). The area was once home to the Rosebank station on the railway's now-defunct South Beach Branch, which was located east of the proposed station site.

Several proposals have been made to connect the SIR to the subway system, including the abandoned, unfinished Staten Island Tunnel and a line along the Verrazzano–Narrows Bridge using B Division cars and loading gauge, but economic, political and engineering difficulties have prevented these projects from realization.

=== Possible North Shore Branch restoration ===
In a 2006 report, the Staten Island Advance explored the restoration of passenger service on 5.1 miles (8.2 km) of the North Shore Branch between St. George and Arlington. Completion of a study is necessary to qualify the project for an estimated $360 million. A preliminary study found that ridership could reach 15,000 daily. U.S. Senator Chuck Schumer of New York requested $4 million of federal funding for a detailed feasibility study. In 2012, the MTA released an analysis of North Shore transportation solutions which included proposals for the reintroduction of heavy rail, light rail or bus rapid transit using the North Shore line's right-of-way. Other options included system management, which would improve existing bus service, and the possibility of future ferry and water taxi service. Bus rapid transit was preferred for its cost ($352 million in capital investment) and relative ease of implementation. In January 2018, the project had yet to receive funding. As part of the 2015–2019 MTA Capital Program, $4 million was allocated for an analysis of Staten Island light rail.

== Branches and stations ==
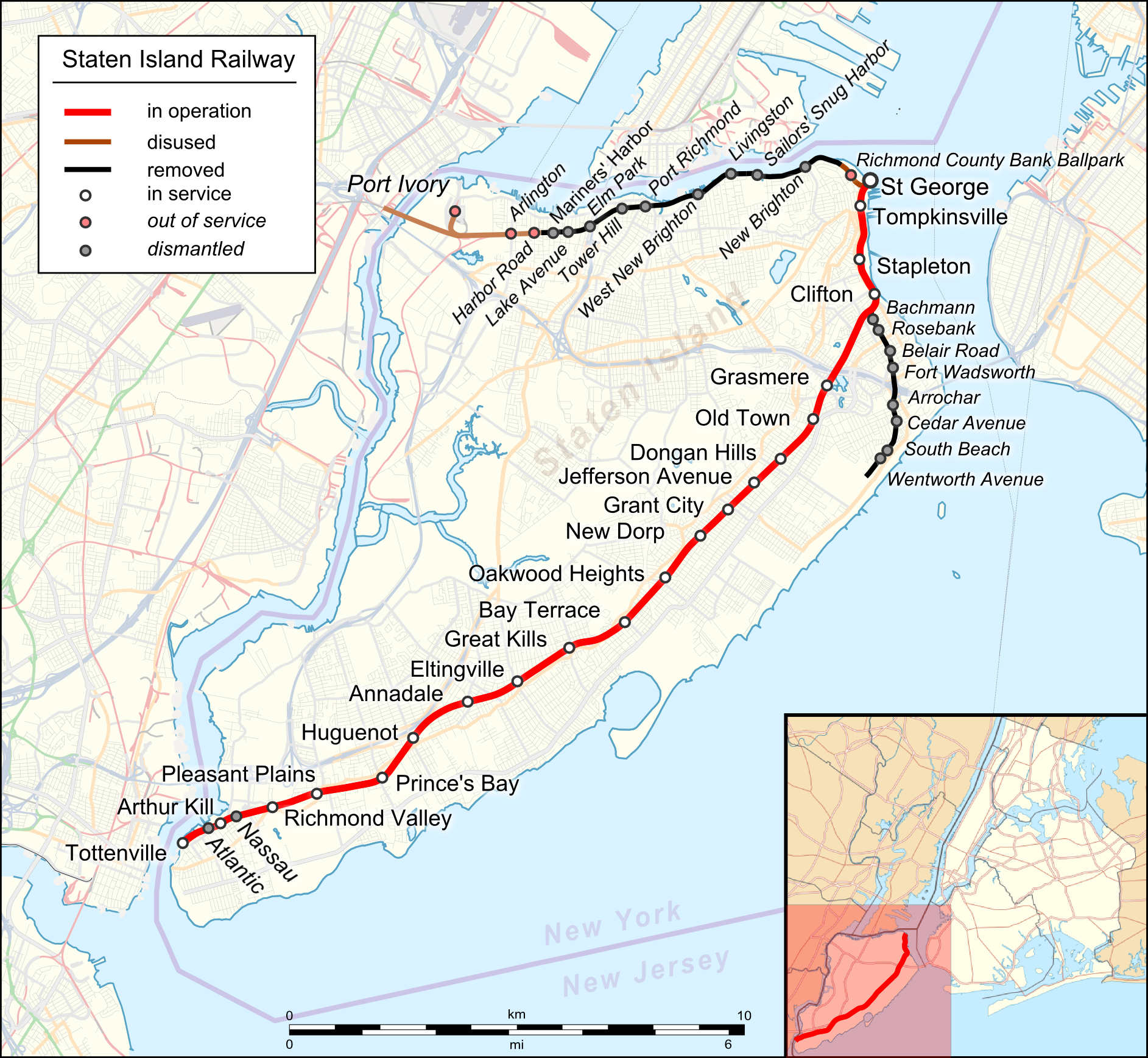
SIR map, with all passenger branches and stations

Map of former and current passenger lines overlaid on a modern road map

=== Main Line stations ===
Station service legend
Stops all times	Stops 24 hours a day
Stops rush hours only	Stops during weekday rush hours only
Stops rush hours in the peak direction only	Stops during weekday rush hours in the peak direction only
Time period details
Disabled access	Station is compliant with the Americans with Disabilities Act
↑	Station is compliant with the Americans with Disabilities Act in the indicated direction only
↓	Station is compliant with the Americans with Disabilities Act in the indicated direction only
	Elevator access to mezzanine only

* Some local trains start at Huguenot during morning rush hours.

Normal service	Peak services			Station	Opened	Closed	Connections, notes
Normal service	Lcl	AM exp	PM exp	Station	Opened	Closed	Connections, notes
Stops all times	Stops rush hours only	Stops rush hours only	Stops rush hours in the peak direction only	St. George Terminal	March 7, 1886		Staten Island Ferry to Whitehall Terminal; NYCT Bus: S40, S42, S44, S46, S48, S51, S52, S61, S62, S66, S74, S76, S78, S81, S84, S86, S90, S91, S92, S94, S96, S98
Stops all times	Stops rush hours only	|	|	Tompkinsville	July 31, 1884		NYCT Bus: S46, S48, S51, S61, S62, S66, S74, S76, S78, S81, S84, S86, S91, S92, S96, S98
Stops all times	Stops rush hours only	|	|	Stapleton	July 31, 1884		NYCT Bus: S51, S52, S74, S76, S78, S81, S84, SIM30
Stops all times	Stops rush hours only	|	|	Clifton	April 23, 1860		NYCT Bus: S51 Originally Vanderbilt's Landing; no access from last car northbound
Stops all times	Stops rush hours only	|	|	Grasmere	1886		NYCT Bus: S53
Stops all times	Stops rush hours only	|	|	Old Town	1937		NYCT Bus: S78, S79 SBS, SIM1, SIM7, SIM10, SIM11 Originally Old Town Road
Stops all times	Stops rush hours only	|	|	Dongan Hills	April 23, 1860		Originally Garretson's
Stops all times	Stops rush hours only	|	|	Jefferson Avenue	1937		
Stops all times	Stops rush hours only	|	|	Grant City	April 23, 1860		NYCT Bus: S51, S81
Stops all times	Stops rush hours only	↑	|	New Dorp	April 23, 1860		NYCT Bus: S57, S76, S86
Stops all times	Stops rush hours only	↑	|	Oakwood Heights	April 23, 1860		NYCT Bus: S57 Originally Richmond, then Court House, then Oakwood
Stops all times	Stops rush hours only	↑	|	Bay Terrace	Early 1900s		Replaced older Whitlock
Stops all times	Stops rush hours only	Stops rush hours only	Stops rush hours in the peak direction only	Great Kills	April 23, 1860		NYCT Bus: S54, SIM5, SIM6 Southern terminus for select rush hour local trains Originally Gifford's
Stops all times	* ↑	Stops rush hours only	Stops rush hours in the peak direction only	Eltingville	April 23, 1860		NYCT Bus: S59, S79 SBS, S89, SIM1, SIM7, SIM10, SIM22
				Woods of Arden	1886	c. 1894–1895	Closed
Stops all times	* ↑	Stops rush hours only	Stops rush hours in the peak direction only	Annadale	May 14, 1860		NYCT Bus: S55, SIM23
Stops all times	* ↑	Stops rush hours only	Stops rush hours in the peak direction only	Huguenot	June 2, 1860		NYCT Bus: S55, SIM2 SIM24 Some northbound local a.m. rush hour trips begin at this station Originally Bloomingview, then Huguenot Park
Stops all times		Stops rush hours only	Stops rush hours in the peak direction only	Prince's Bay	June 2, 1860		NYCT Bus: S55, S56, SIM25 Originally Lemon Creek, then Princes Bay
Stops all times		Stops rush hours only	Stops rush hours in the peak direction only	Pleasant Plains	June 2, 1860		NYCT Bus: S55, SIM26
Stops all times		Stops rush hours only	Stops rush hours in the peak direction only	Richmond Valley	June 2, 1860		NYCT Bus: SIM26 No access from last car
				Nassau	c. 1924	January 21, 2017	Replaced by Arthur Kill
Stops all times		Stops rush hours only	Stops rush hours in the peak direction only	Arthur Kill	January 21, 2017		NYCT Bus: S78
				Atlantic	c.1909–1911	January 21, 2017	Replaced by Arthur Kill
Stops all times		Stops rush hours only	Stops rush hours in the peak direction only	Tottenville	June 2, 1860		NYCT Bus: S78

=== Stations on former branches ===
==== North Shore Branch ====
The North Shore Branch closed to passenger service at midnight on March 31, 1953. A small portion of the western end is used for freight service as part of the ExpressRail intermodal network at the Howland Hook Marine Terminal. The network, which opened in 2007, connects to the Chemical Coast after crossing the Arthur Kill Vertical Lift Bridge. The North Shore Branch served Procter & Gamble, United States Gypsum, shipbuilders and a car float at Saint George Yard. A smaller eastern portion, which provided seasonal passenger service to the Richmond County Bank Ballpark station (where the Staten Island Yankees played), operated from June 24, 2001, to June 18, 2010. In 2008, restoration was discussed along the mostly abandoned 6.1-mile (9.8 km) line as part of the island's light-rail plan. An environmental impact assessment is being worked on for the implementation of a bus rapid transit line on the North Shore Branch.

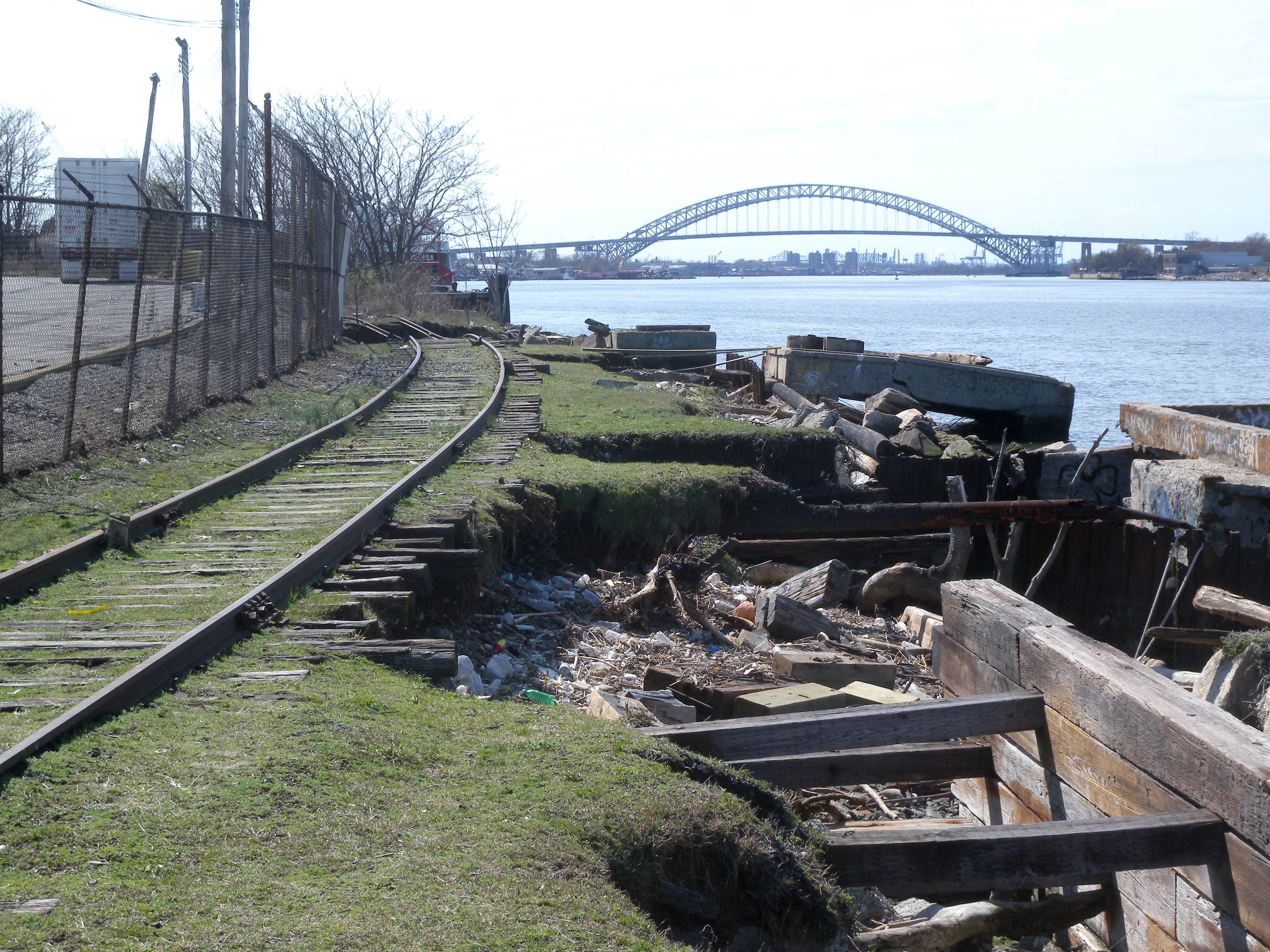
The abandoned North Shore Branch, with the Bayonne Bridge in the background

Miles	Name	Opened	Closed	Notes
0	St. George	March 7, 1886		
0.1	RCB Ballpark	June 24, 2001	June 18, 2010	
0.7	New Brighton	February 23, 1886	March 31, 1953	
1.2	Sailors' Snug Harbor	February 23, 1886	March 31, 1953	
1.8	Livingston	February 23, 1886	March 31, 1953	
2.4	West Brighton	February 23, 1886	March 31, 1953	
3.0	Port Richmond	February 23, 1886	March 31, 1953	
3.4	Tower Hill	February 23, 1886	March 31, 1953	
3.9	Elm Park	February 23, 1886	March 31, 1953	
4.3	Lake Avenue	1937	March 31, 1953	
4.6	Mariners Harbor	Summer 1886	March 31, 1953	Originally named Erastina
4.9	Harbor Road	1935–1937	March 31, 1953	
5.2	Arlington	1889–1890	March 31, 1953	
6.1	Port Ivory	1906	1948	

==== South Beach Branch ====
The South Beach Branch opened on January 1, 1888, to Arrochar, and was extended to South Beach in 1893. The branch closed at midnight on March 31, 1953. It was abandoned and demolished, except for a few segments: a concrete embankment at Clayton Street and Saint John's Avenue, the Tompkins Avenue overpass, trestle over Robin Road in Arrochar and a filled-in bridge under McClean Avenue. This 4.1-mile (6.6 km) line left the Main Line at 40°37′08″N 74°04′18″W (south of the Clifton station), and was east of the Main Line. Although the right-of-way has been redeveloped, most of it is still traceable on maps; Lily Pond Avenue is built over the right of way where it passes under the Staten Island Expressway.

The Robin Road trestle is the only remaining intact trestle along the former line. Developers purchased the land on either side of its abutments during the early 2000s, and the developers, the New York City Department of Transportation, and the New York City Transit Authority all claimed ownership. Townhouses have been built on both sides of the trestle.

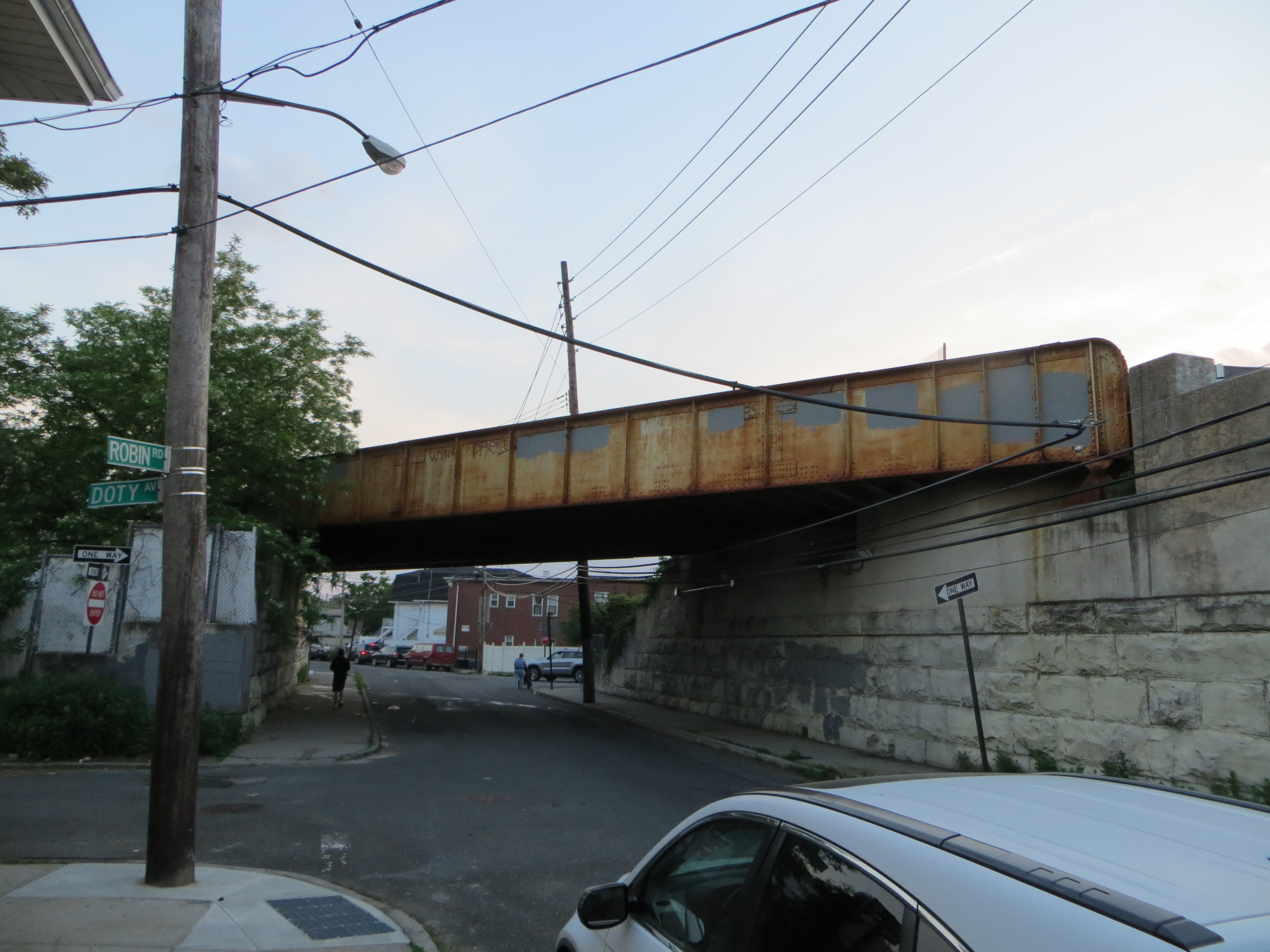
Abandoned trestle over Robin Road

Miles	Name	Opened	Closed
2.0	Bachmann	January 1, 1888	1937
2.1	Rosebank	January 1, 1888	March 31, 1953
2.5	Belair Road	January 1, 1888	March 31, 1953
2.7	Fort Wadsworth	January 1, 1888	March 31, 1953
3.2	Arrochar	January 1, 1888	March 31, 1953
3.5	Cedar Avenue	1931	March 31, 1953
3.9	South Beach	1893	March 31, 1953
4.1	Wentworth Avenue	1925	March 31, 1953

=== Freight lines ===
==== Travis Branch ====
The Travis Branch, from Arlington Yard to Fresh Kills, runs along the island's West Shore. The branch was built in 1928 to serve Gulf Oil along the Arthur Kill, south from Arlington Yard into the marshes to Gulfport. It was extended to Travis to serve the new Consolidated Edison power plant in 1957. In 2005, the branch was renovated and extended from the old Con Edison plant to the Staten Island Transfer Station at Fresh Kills; regular service to the transfer station began in April 2007.

==== Mount Loretto Spur ====
The Mount Loretto Spur is an abandoned branch whose purpose was to serve the Mount Loretto Children's Home. The spur diverged from the Main Line south of Pleasant Plains. The B&O Railroad served the non-electrified branch, which had some industry and a passenger station, until 1950. Although its track was removed during the 1960s and 1970s, some ties were visible until the 1980s. A coal trestle is all that remains of the branch.

==== West Shore Line ====
South of the Richmond Valley station, a non-electrified spur, branched off the Tottenville-bound track. The spur, built in 1928, was called the West Shore Line by the B&O Railroad and delivered building materials to the Outerbridge Crossing construction site near Arthur Kill. Years later, the track was used to serve a scrapyard owned by the Roselli Brothers. This siding went out of service on June 14, 2011. The track divided in two under Page Avenue, with the rails still in place. The line's right-of-way, an easement on property owned by Nassau Metals, was later used by CSX. Although sections of the old tracks have been removed, others remain in the overgrowth.

== See also ==
- Cross-Harbor Rail Tunnel
