= New Brighton station (Staten Island Railway) =

Former Staten Island Railway station

New Brighton

General information
- Location: Westervelt Avenue & Richmond Terrace; Staten Island
- Coordinates: 40.6469°N 74.0893°W
- Line: North Shore Branch
- Platforms: 2 side platforms
- Tracks: 2

History
- Opened: February 23, 1886; 140 years ago
- Closed: March 31, 1953; 73 years ago
- Former names: Westervelt Avenue

Former services
Preceding station	Staten Island Railway	Following station
Sailors' Snug Harbor toward Port Ivory	North Shore Branch	St. George Terminus
Location

New Brighton was a station on the abandoned North Shore Branch of the Staten Island Railway. It had two tracks and two side platforms. It was located in the New Brighton section of Staten Island, at the north end of Westervelt Avenue and Richmond Terrace (near Jersey Street). It was the closest original North Shore station to the Saint George Terminal, 0.7 miles (1.1 km) from the station.

== History ==
The station opened on February 23, 1886, along with the rest of the North Shore branch west to Elm Park. The station was located near the edge of the Kill Van Kull, several feet below street level. The southernmost (St. George-bound) platform was constructed directly at the rear of apartment buildings. A wooden stationhouse, signed "NEW BRIGHTON R.R. STATION," was located at street level at the foot of Westervelt Avenue between the buildings. The stationhouse led to an overpass and stairs down to the northern (west-bound) platform. Canopies were located at the eastern end of the station. West of the station, the line crossed Jersey Street at-grade.

The New Brighton station is referred to as Westervelt Avenue on the map of the 1939 IND Second System plan, which would have connected the SIRT to subway lines in Brooklyn via the incomplete Staten Island Tunnel; New Brighton would have been the last stop on the North Shore Branch before entering the tunnel.

The station was closed and abandoned on March 31, 1953, along with the other passenger stations on the North Shore Branch. No trace of the station exist today. In the late 1990s, the Bank Street Bridge, which crossed over the line from Richmond Terrace near Jersey Street, was eliminated due to safety issues. Around that same time, Bank Street was extended east of Jersey Street adjacent to the former SIR right-of-way and parallel to Richmond Terrace, to provide access to the parking lot for the Richmond County Bank Ballpark. As of 2015, there are plans to reconstruct the bridge.

New Brighton is one of the stations to be returned to operation under the proposals for reactivation of the North Shore branch for rapid transit, light rail, or bus rapid transit service. The potential station site has been moved farther west between Franklin and Lafayette Avenues, currently used by a farmer's market and the Atlantic Salt corporation; the latter owns the North Shore right-of-way east to Bank Street.
