= Harbor station =

Harbor or Harbour station may refer to:

== Railway stations ==
=== United Kingdom ===
- Ardrossan Harbour railway station in Ardrossan, North Ayrshire, Scotland
- Fishguard Harbour railway station in Fishguard Harbor, Wales
- Folkestone Harbour railway station in Folkestone, England
- Newhaven Harbour railway station in East Sussex, England
- Porthmadog Harbour railway station in Portmadog, Wales
- Portsmouth Harbour railway station in Portsmouth, England

=== United States ===
- Cold Spring Harbor (LIRR station) in Cold Spring Harbor, New York
- Egg Harbor City station in Egg Harbor City, New Jersey
- Erie Canal Harbor station (now Canalside station) in Buffalo, New York
- Harbor station (MBTA) in Gloucester, Massachusetts
- Harbor Freeway station in Los Angeles, California
- Harbor Gateway Transit Center in Gardena, California
- Harbor Park station in Norfolk, Virginia
- Harbor Road station in Staten Island, New York
- Laurence Harbor station in Laurence, New Jersey
- Lincoln Harbor station in Weehawken, New Jersey
- Mariners' Harbor station in Staten Island, New York
- Sailors' Snug Harbor station in Staten Island, New York
- South Harbor station in Cleveland, Ohio

=== Other countries ===
- Outer Harbor railway station in North Haven, South Australia, Australia
- Taichung Port Station in Qingshui District, Taichung, Taiwan

== Military installations ==
- Salem Harbor#Air Station Salem at Salem Harbor in Salem, Massachusetts, United States
- Bucks Harbor Air Force Station in Machias, Maine, United States
- Naval Station Pearl Harbor in Honolulu, Hawaii, United States
- Old Harbor U.S. Life Saving Station in Provincetown, Massachusetts, United States

== Sports venues ==
- Harbour Station in Saint John, New Brunswick, Canada
