= Baltimore and New York Railway =

Former railroad line in New Jersey

Overview
- Locale: New Jersey
- Dates of operation: 1888–1944
- Successor: CSX

Technical
- Track gauge: 4 ft 8 1/2 in (1,435 mm) standard gauge
- Length: 5.35 miles (8.61 km)

The Baltimore and New York Railway was a railroad line built by the Baltimore and Ohio Railroad (B&O) from Cranford, New Jersey, to the western side of the Arthur Kill Bridge in New Jersey, connecting with the North Shore Branch of Staten Island Rapid Transit. The line was built to provide the B&O access to a terminal in New York City, in Staten Island. Today, the line is used by CSX Transportation for freight trains.

== History ==
=== Background ===
In 1883, Erastus Wiman proposed using the barely operational Staten Island Railway as the centerpiece of his plan to develop the island. Wiman's plan called for a system encircling the island using two miles of the SIRW between Vanderbilt's Landing and Tompkinsville. His plan also called for the centralization of all ferries from one terminal, replacing the six to eight terminals active near what is now St. George. Wiman approached Robert Garrett, president of the Baltimore & Ohio Railroad (B&O), to back the plan, and Garrett agreed. To this end the Staten Island Rapid Transit Railroad Company (SIRTR) was organized on March 25, 1880 and incorporated on April 14, 1880.

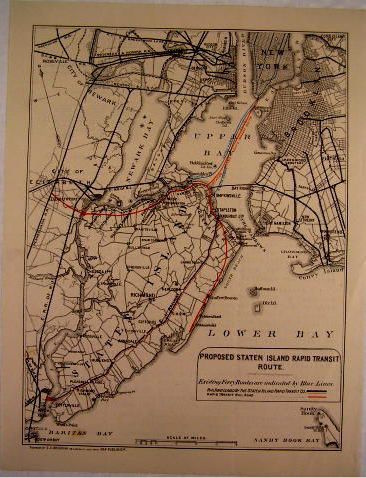
Proposed Staten Island Transit route map. "Existing Ferry Routes are indicated by blue lines." Issued c. 1884 by E.C. Bridgman, NY, Map Publisher.

On April 3, 1883, the SIRTR gained control of the Staten Island Railway, as Erasmus Wiman was elected to its board of Directors of the Railroad and became the railway's president. On June 30, 1883, the SIRTR leased the SIRW for a term of 99 years, to become effective when the line opened between Clifton and Tompkinsville. In July 1884, after obtaining control of the franchises for the Staten Island Ferry, Wiman proposed connecting the island to New Jersey through the construction of bridges, and to complete expanded storage and terminal facilities on New York Harbor.

On August 7, 1885, it was reported that Erastus Wiman had started negotiations with President Robert Garrett to discuss Wiman's idea to have the B&O's proposed New York entrance be in Staten Island, where a terminal for passenger and freight operations could be constructed. The B&O would access Staten Island by a combination of some railroads in New Jersey. Wiman indicated in an interview that Garrett had been introduced to his proposal indirectly as early as December 1884. Wiman's initial proposal was to have the B&O obtain trackage rights over the Jersey Central to Elizabeth, and run over a new line he would build that would cross the Arthur Kill and connect to his North Shore Branch on Staten Island to provide access to St. George. Wiman also proposed an alternative in which he would build a new line between Philadelphia and Elizabethport for the B&O if that railroad entered into a traffic agreement with him.

A controlling interest in the SIRTR was obtained by the B&O in November 1885 through purchases of stock. On November 21, 1885, at a stockholders' meeting of the SIRTR, an agreement by which the B&O would lease the SIRTR for 99 years was unanimously approved. The B&O acquired half of the $500,000 stock of the SIRTR, and the B&O guaranteed the interest and principal on the SIRTR's bonds, which were estimated to total $2 million. In addition, SIRTR stockholders were guaranteed to receive as much revenue from through-traffic as they currently got from local traffic. The sale of SIRTR stock would pay for the completion of the SIRTR's North Shore Branch, a bridge across the Arthur Kill, terminal facilities, and waterfront property already acquired.

As part of the deal, the B&O also acquired the ferries owned by the SIRTR, the dock facilities it contracted from, over 150 acres of land, and approximately 2 miles of deep port water front. The agreement would give the B&O access to Staten Island's waterfront on New York Harbor, where it could construct terminal facilities for the shipment, storage, and reception of freight, eliminating the expensive cost of using facilities in Brooklyn and New York, and saving money on charges such as rehandling and lighterage. This would allow the B&O to compete with the Pennsylvania Railroad (PRR) in the freight business. The SIRTR's acquisition by the B&O would provide it access to the larger railroad's financial resources.

Following the confirmation of the contract by the SIRTR, it was revealed that the shareholders of the B&O had unanimously ratified the agreement with the SIRTR at their annual meeting on November 16. Following the ratification of the deal by the SIRTR, a new board of directors of that company was elected, consisting of seven B&O directors and six of the old SIRTR directors.

The B&O planned to construct an 18-mile line from the Philadelphia and Reading Railway at Bound Brook to Elizabeth for $1.5 million. A bridge would be constructed across the Arthur Kill from Elizabeth to connect to the SIRTR. Wiman needed the proceeds of the sale to pay for the construction of the North Shore Branch. The funds also helped pay for the construction of a bridge over the Kill Van Kull, the acquisition of 2 miles (3.2 km) of waterfront property, and for terminal facilities at St. George. The bridge was estimated to cost less than $300,000.

In addition, the B&O planned to place large screw steamers on the Staten Island Ferry to allow full trains to be carried on board, providing direct passenger service to New York City, with access to all the city's elevated lines and the Broadway streetcar lines available at the Battery. The trip on the ferry would not take longer than 15 minutes. In terms of freight, coal piers would be installed on the Staten Island waterfront to enable the loading of coal directly into steamers, grain elevators and warehouses would be installed, and docks and piers would be put into place to allow deep water boats to be loaded without requiring the use of expensive lighters. Robert Garrett expected that large warehouses would soon be constructed on the island, and that the island would become a very desirable location for many industries and as a place for people to live. In a statement issued on November 21, Garrett said that the B&O had to find its own New York terminal facilities since the Jersey Central had refused to accept a traffic agreement offered by the B&O through the Philadelphia and Reading Railway in summer 1884. Garrett stated that the cost of gaining entrance to New York was "so comparatively light."

$1,500,000 of real estate on Staten Island changed ownership in the previous two weeks at increasing prices as a result of insider knowledge of the deal.

While it was immediately expected that the B&Os planned route from Bound Brook to Staten Island, including the construction of the bridge, would be heavily fought by competing railroads, allies of the B&O insisted that work on the bridge and new line would begin immediately. Officers of the Pennsylvania Railroad threatened to block construction of the proposed new B&O line. By the start of December 1885, work has already begun to survey the proposed route of the new line from Bound Brook. At the start of December 1885, the greatest opposition to the new bridge came from Elizabethport due to opposition to the interests of the B&O on the part of local residents and merchants. On November 30, 1885, a certificate of incorporation was filed with the New Jersey secretary of state's office for the Roselle and South Plainfield Railway Company. The railroad, which would be 9.7 miles (15.6 km) long, running from Roselle to a point near Easton and Amboy Road near South Plainfield, was initially suspected to be an attempt to kill the B&O's proposed line. The B&O's proposed independent line to Staten Island would have had to cross one or more branches of the Pennsylvania Railroad, which provided additional opportunities for the line to be delayed.

On December 2, 1885, a director of the Jersey Central said that the railroad was not disturbed by the B&O's announced Staten Island plans and that it was willing to operate B&O service to New York over its line on fair terms and more cheaply than the B&O could do on its own line. The director said there was no danger in having their line paralleled since the B&O could accomplish the same goal more cheaply by running along the route of the Jersey Central. They went on to say that the Jersey Central had not agreed to the traffic agreement offered in summer 1884 as the railroad was suing to annul its lease by the Philadelphia and Reading Railway. Per the director, the contract would have made the Jersey Central poorer as it would have to carry the B&O to the Central's valuable terminal facilities on a proportional rate. The director went on to say that a deal would be worked out with the B&O once Garrett stopped bluffing. It was also reported that Erastus Wiman hired two well known lobbyists for work in the state capitol in Trenton for the winter. While the B&O claimed that a bill passed in the previous winter meant that New Jersey had already authorized the construction of the Arthur Kill Bridge, Congressman William Walter Phelps denied that this was the case. In early December 1885, a group of surveyors tested the bottom of the Arthur Kill opposite the southern portion of Elizabeth to determine a workable location for the bridge.

On December 9, 1885, it was reported that Representative Perry Belmont would introduce a bill to authorize the construction of a bridge across the Arthur Kill and make it a post road to the United States House of Representatives as soon as possible. The bridge would be required to have spans no less than 30 feet above the low water mark, and that are no less than 200 feet in the clear on each side of the central pier of the draw.

The bill to authorize the construction of the Arthur Kill Bridge was introduced in the House by Perry Belmont and in the Senate by Warner Miller. A joint hearing of the subcommittees of the Senate and House Committees of Commerce was held on January 19, 1886 on the bill. Erastus Wiman argued in favor of the bill, detailing the potential economic benefits from completing the bridge, while Congressman William Walther Phelps spoke out against the bridge, saying that the bridge would be harmful to commerce on the Arthur Kill and would be unnecessary. The House Commerce Committee voted to favorably report the bill on February 12, 1886.

Construction of the North Shore Branch began on March 17, 1884, was completed in 1885 and opened for service on February 23, 1886, with trains terminating at Elm Park. On March 7, 1886, the key piece of Wiman's plan, the St. George Terminal, opened. In mid-1886, the North Shore Branch opened its new terminal at Erastina. In 1889–1890, a station was built at the South Avenue grade crossing at Arlington as the tracks were extended to the Arthur Kill Bridge. At Arlington, trains were reversed for their trip back to St. George. Even a few years after its opening, most trains terminated at Erastina.

=== Incorporation and construction ===
The B&O made various proposals for a railroad between Staten Island and New Jersey. The accepted plan consisted of a 5.25 miles (8.45 km)-long section from the Arthur Kill to meet the Jersey Central Railroad at Cranford, through Roselle and Linden in Union County.

On June 8, 1886, it was reported that negotiations were going on between some B&O and Erie Railroad officials about the B&O's making use of the Erie depot for its passenger terminal. As part of the plan, a new 24 miles (39 km) line would be constructed between Bound Brook and Newark, connecting with the Erie's Paterson branch line. The line would make all the most important stations between Bound Brook and New York on the Jersey Central, except for Elizabeth, and would pass through Newark, which was only accessible from the Jersey Central via a branch line. While the Jersey Central depot had access to one ferry, the Erie depot had access to two, with one to 23rd Street and one to Chambers Street. It was expected that the line from Bound Brook to Newark could be constructed in a short time period given that no major streams would need to be crossed and since the ground is fairly level. The line would make use of a charter that was quietly taken out some time previously for a rail line between Plainfield and Elizabeth.

Passenger service would head to the Erie depot while freight service would head to Staten Island. The B&O did not want to make the Staten Island route a passenger route since boats on the Staten Island Ferry took a long time to make the trip to New York during the winter and foggy weather, and since it was disinclined to reach an agreement with the Jersey Central. The directors of the railroad did not show a willingness to make favorable agreements with the B&O, and the railroad was in such poor financial condition that a rival railroad could take control of it. Samuel Sloan, president of the Delaware, Lackawanna and Western Railroad, did not want to get involved with the B&O, leaving the Erie Railroad as the only available option to make an agreement with. The B&O was in the process of negotiations for the acquisition of property on Staten Island to the north of the proposed bridge across the Arthur Kill. Some New Jersey property owners, according to a New Jersey lawyer, would request an injunction to stop construction of the bridge as soon as construction begun.

On August 12, 1886, a 999-year joint contract between the B&O and the Jersey Central was formally approved at a meeting of the Jersey Central. As part of the agreement, an existing one between the B&O and the Reading Railroad, and through them, the Jersey Central, that called for the three railroads to be operated as a single line, was recognized. The Jersey Central agreed to not object to the construction of a bridge to Staten Island over the Arthur Kill. The B&O was granted rights to all passenger, express, and freight over its line to Staten Island if it desired, but agreed not to divert freight business to Staten Island for two years, and not to divert express and passenger service for six years. After that time frame, the B&O would maintain its ability to decide whether to continue running service to the Jersey Central's Jersey City terminals. The B&O also agreed to drop plans to construct an independent line between Bound Brook and the Arthur Kill, and between Bound Brook and Elizabeth; instead the B&O would make use of the Jersey Central's line. The Jersey Central would be guaranteed the haul on B&O trains between Elizabeth and Bound Brook. To connect to Staten Island, a line would be built between Elizabeth, two miles from the Arthur Kill.

In November 1886, it was believed by many in Baltimore that the B&O may have temporarily at least given up its proposed extension to Staten Island and instead planned to use the Reading Railroad's facilities following the announcement of a conference between President Garrett of the B&O and President Roberts of the Pennsylvania Railroad.

On June 25, 1887, New Jersey obtained an injunction against the Baltimore & New York Railway to prevent them from continuing work on the Arthur Kill Bridge.

On July 9, 1888, the Pennsylvania Railroad announced that it had obtained an interest in the Staten Island Belt Line Horse Car Railroad immediately after it discovered that the B&O had obtained control of the SIRTR. The Pennsylvania was also the largest owner of the Bergen Point horse car line, which was operated to connect with the recently constructed Bergen Point Ferry at Port Richmond. The belt line was in the process of being extended to Erastina. A Pennsylvania Railroad representative said that it claimed the right to use the Arthur Kill Bridge, and thus planned to extend the Belt Line a mile from Erastina to Howland's Hook. This extension would be constructed over a new street between the former Shore Road and the SIRTR. In addition, making use of the Belt Line's existing charter, the line would be extended to connect with the St. George ferry terminal. The Pennsylvania also planned to institute a new ferry service between Howland's Hook and Elizabethport, providing a connection independent of the bridge. While it planned to create new terminal facilities at Port Richmond, the main station and terminal facilities would be at Tompkinsville, from which the Pennsylvania would run a ferry to New York. The Pennsylvania representative also said that the railroad was considering making South Beach a greater resort than Coney Island.

On July 30, 1888, it was announced that the B&O would immediately make connections between Staten Island and Philadelphia by making use of the trackage agreement with the Reading Railroad and the Jersey Central and constructing a line between Roselle on the Jersey Central and the Arthur Kill Bridge. Engineers were in the process of surveying this route, and B&O officials completed a thorough investigation of the proposed New York Harbor terminals on Staten Island, determining that they would add substantial additional property to the waterfront already owned by the SIRTR. Work on the connecting structure between the bridge and the North Shore Branch on Staten Island was expected to be finished by October 1, 1888.

In October 1888, the B&O created the subsidiary Baltimore & New York Railway (B&NY) to build the line, which was to be operated by the SIRTR. Construction started in 1889 and the line was finished later that year. After three years of effort by Wiman, Congress passed a law on June 16, 1886, authorizing the construction of a 500-foot (150 m) swing bridge over the Arthur Kill. The start of construction was delayed for nine months because it awaited approval of the Secretary of War, and another six months due to an injunction from the State of New Jersey. Construction had to continue through the brutal winter of 1888 because Congress had set a completion deadline of June 16, 1888; two years after signing the bill. The bridge was completed three days early on June 13, 1888.

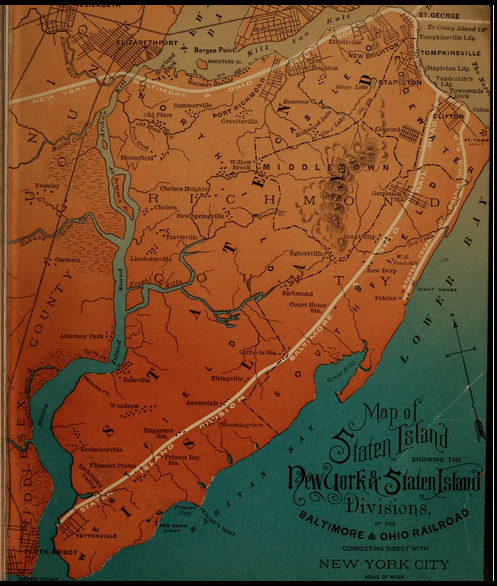
A Map of the Staten Island Rapid Transit Company from 1885

When it was completed, the Arthur Kill Bridge was the largest drawbridge ever constructed; it cost $450,000 and was constructed without fatalities. The bridge consisted of five pieces of masonry, the center one being midstream with the draw resting on it. The bridge's drawspan was 500 feet (150 m), the fixed spans were 150 feet (46 m), and there were clear waterways of 208 feet (63 m) on either side of the draw, making the bridge 800 feet (240 m) wide. The bridge was 30 feet (9.1 m) above the low water mark. Construction of the draw needed 656 tons of iron, and 85 tons were needed for each of the approaches. At the time of the bridges completion, trains were planned to start running on the bridge by September 1, 1888.

On March 4, 1889, Erastus Wiman predicted that trains would run over the bridge by July 1, 1890. The only work left to be done was to complete the installation of 5.25 miles (8.45 km) of track between the New Jersey side of the Arthur Kill Bridge and Roselle–Roselle Park station on the Jersey Central. It was expected that this work would be completed by the middle of summer 1890 by the most conservative estimate. At the time, it was expected that, with the completion of this work, B&O freight trains and passenger trains would head to Staten Island. On August 6, 1889, it was reported that the B&O would be able to use its Staten Island terminal facilities in three weeks.

Since the approaches were not finished, the bridge was not used until January 1, 1890, when the first train from St. George to Cranford Junction crossed the bridge.

Because the land for the approaches was low and swampy, 2 miles (3.2 km) of elevated structure was built; 6,000 feet (1,800 m) on Staten Island and 4,000 feet (1,200 m) in New Jersey. The North Shore Branch was opened to freight traffic on March 1, 1890. On July 1, 1890, all of the B&O's freight traffic started using the line. The B&O paid the SIRTR 10 cents-per-ton trackage to use the line from Arthur Kill to St. George. Once the Arthur Kill Bridge was completed, pressure was brought upon the United States War Department by the Lehigh Valley Railroad and the PRR to have the newly built bridge torn down and replaced with a bridge with a different design, claiming it was an obstruction for the navigation of coal barges past Holland Hook on the Arthur Kill. Their efforts were not successful.

The SIRT operated four trains every day, except for Sunday, with direct connections with the B&O's Royal Blue service between New York City and Washington, D.C. at Plainfield. These trains consisted of a locomotive and two passenger coaches. While this service was in operation, the B&O sold tickets for its main line trains at the railroad's ferry terminals in Brooklyn, at South Ferry, and at St. George. The service was discontinued in 1903 because it was unprofitable.

In October 1905, the B&O was in the process of making a series of upgrades to its Staten Island lines. Trestles at Port Richmond and Livingston, on the east side of the Arthur Kill Bridge, and over the Pennsylvania Railroad trestle at Linden Junction were in the process of being filled. In addition, two docks were to be extended, a new 485 foot-long and 30 foot-wide lighterage pier would be constructed, and a 476 foot-long and 51 foot-wide stone dock would be constructed. Furthermore, a new 800-foot long and 100-foot wide double-track foreign freight pier was to be constructed at Tompkinsville for $300,000. The right-of-way of lines on Staten Island would be reballasted with stone and would be relayed with 85-pound steel rails. Work to double-track the Baltimore and New York Railway for a mile east of Cranford was already completed, and work on a new eastbound yard at Cranford Junction was expected to be completed by October 15, 1905, while work to reballast the entire line with stone was underway.

=== Merger into Staten Island Rapid Transit ===
Freight and World War II traffic helped pay off some of the debt the SIRT had accumulated, briefly making it profitable. B&O freight trains operated to Staten Island and Jersey City. Around this time, B&O crews began running through without changing at different junctions. Regular B&O crews and Staten Island crews were separated, meaning the crews had to change before they could enter Staten Island. All traffic to and from Cranford Junction in New Jersey was handled by the SIRT crews. During the war, all east coast military hospital trains were handled by the SIRT—the trains came onto Staten Island through Cranford Junction, with some trains stopping at Arlington to transfer wounded soldiers to Halloran Hospital. Freight tonnage doubled on the SIRT between 1942 and 1944 to a record 3.2 million tons. The Baltimore & New York Railway line become extremely busy, handling 742,000 troops, 100,000 prisoners-of-war, and war material operating over this stretch to reach their destinations. Two B&O subsidiaries, the B&NY and the SIRT, were merged on December 31, 1944. Since the Baltimore & New York Railway opened in 1890, the SIRT operated this line with locomotives belonging to itself and to its parent company, the B&O. Around the time of World War II, the B&O operated special trains for important officials. One special was operated for former Prime Minister of the United Kingdom, Sir Winston Churchill. The train took him to Stapleton, from where he boarded a ship to Europe. The SIRT made special arrangements for the trip, including a shined-up locomotive sporting polished rods, white tires, and an engine crew clad in white uniforms.

=== Decline in freight ===
In November 1957, the Arthur Kill swing bridge was damaged by an Esso oil tanker, and was replaced by a state-of-the-art, single track, 558 foot vertical lift bridge in 1959. The 2,000 ton lift span was prefabricated, then floated into place. The new bridge was raised 135 feet and since the new bridge aided navigation on the Arthur Kill, the United States government assumed 90% of the $11 million cost of the project. Freight trains started crossing the bridge when it opened on August 25, 1959.

The B&O became part of the larger C&O system through a merger with the Chesapeake and Ohio Railway. The freight operation on the island was renamed the Staten Island Railroad Corporation in 1971. The B&O and C&O became isolated from their other properties in New Jersey and Staten Island, with the creation of Conrail on April 1, 1976, by merger of bankrupt lines in the northeast United States. As a result, their freight service was truncated to Philadelphia, however, for several years afterward, one B&O freight train a day ran to Cranford Junction, with B&O locomotives running through as well. By the year 1973, the Jersey Central's car float yard at Jersey Central was closed. Afterwards, the car float operation of the B&O was brought back to Staten Island at Saint George Yard. This car float operation was taken over by the New York Dock Railway in September 1979, and was ended the following year. Only a few isolated industries on Staten Island were using rail service for freight, meaning that the yard at Saint George was essentially abandoned.

The C&O system was forced to sell the Staten Island Railroad to the New York, Susquehanna & Western Railroad, which was owned by the Delaware Otsego Corporation in April 1985, due to a lack of business. The Susquehanna then embargoed the track east of Elm Park on the North Shore Branch, ending rail freight traffic to Saint George. In 1990, Procter & Gamble, the line's largest customer, closed. This led to a large drop in freight traffic, with the last freight train over the bridge coming in 1990, and all operations ending altogether on July 25, 1991, when the Arthur Kill bridge was taken out of service. Afterwards, the North Shore Branch and the Arthur Kill Bridge were taken over by CSX. The line as well as the bridge were purchased again in 1994, this time by the New York City Economic Development Corporation (NYCEDC), whose purchase was followed by a decade of false starts.

=== Reactivation of freight rail ===
During the early 2000s, plans for reopening the Staten Island Rapid Transit line in New Jersey were announced by the New York Port Authority. Since the Central Railroad of New Jersey became a New Jersey Transit line, a new junction would be built to the former Lehigh Valley Railroad. In order for all New England and southern freight to pass through the New York metropolitan area, a rail tunnel from Brooklyn to Staten Island, and a rail tunnel from Brooklyn to Greenville, New Jersey were planned. On December 15, 2004, a $72 million project to reactivate freight service on Staten Island and to repair the Arthur Kill Vertical Lift Bridge was announced by the NYCEDC and the Port Authority of New York and New Jersey. Specific projects on the Arthur Kill Vertical Lift Bridge included repainting the steel superstructure and rehabilitating the lift mechanism. In June 2006, the freight line connection from New Jersey to the Staten Island Railway was completed, and became operated in part by the Morristown and Erie Railway under contract with the State of New Jersey and other companies.

The Arthur Kill Vertical Lift Bridge was renovated in 2006 and began regular service on April 2, 2007, sixteen years after the bridge closed. A portion of the North Shore Line was rehabilitated, and the Arlington Yard was expanded. Soon after service restarted on the line, Mayor Michael Bloomberg officially commemorated the reactivation on April 17, 2007. Along the remainder of the North Shore Branch, there are still tracks and rail overpasses in some places.
