= Tower Hill station (Staten Island Railway) =

Former Staten Island Railway station

Tower Hill
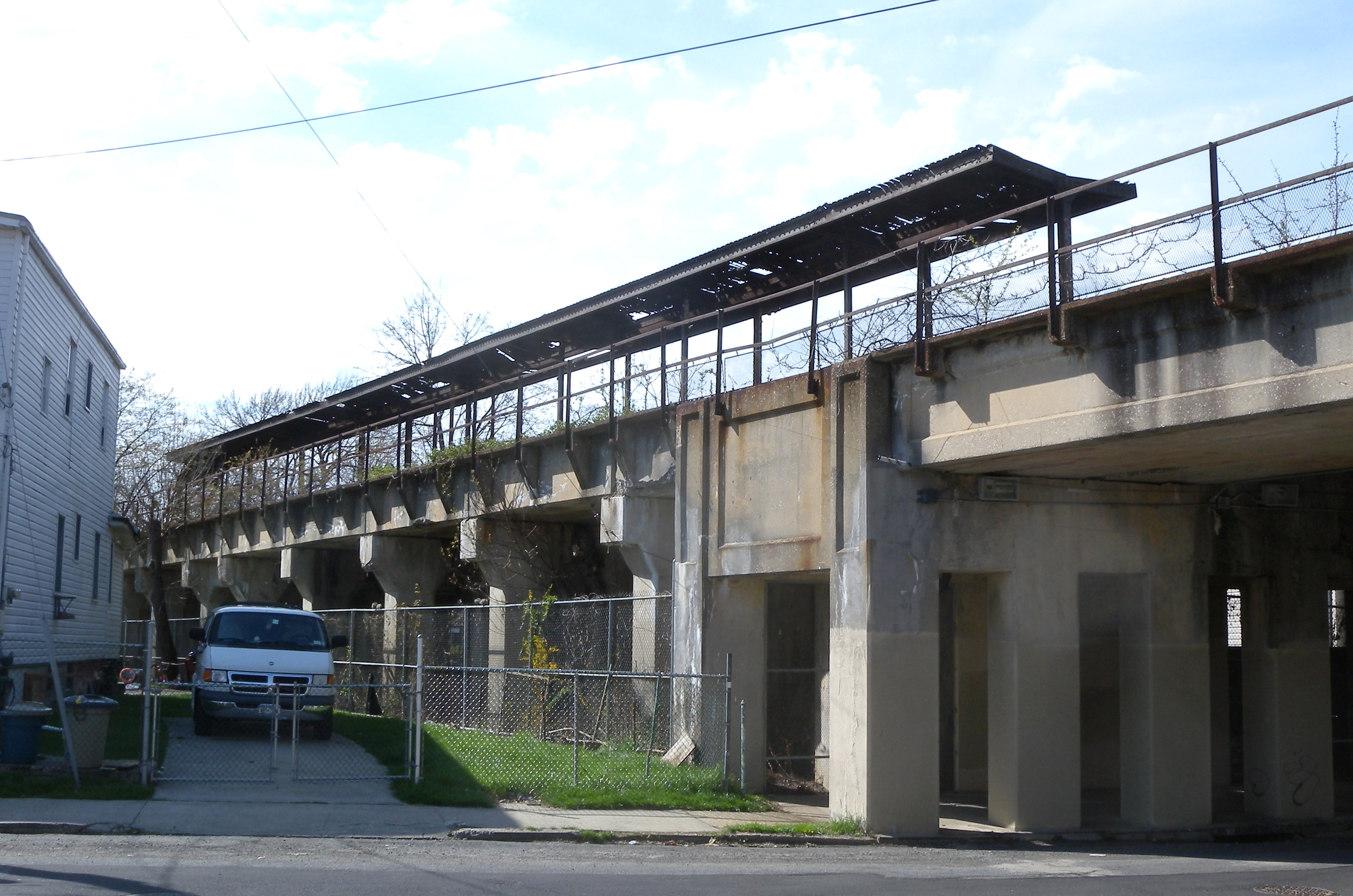
- Sharpe Avenue

General information
- Location: Staten Island
- Coordinates: 40.6387°N 74.1373°W
- Line: North Shore Branch
- Platforms: 1 island platform
- Tracks: 2

History
- Opened: February 23, 1886; 140 years ago
- Closed: March 31, 1953; 73 years ago

Former services
Preceding station	Staten Island Railway	Following station
Elm Park toward Port Ivory	North Shore Branch	Port Richmond toward St. George
Location

Tower Hill is a station on the abandoned North Shore Branch of the Staten Island Railway, located in Tower Hill between the Port Richmond and Elm Park neighborhoods. The station lies between Treadwell and Sharpe Avenues about 3.4 miles (5.5 km) from the Saint George Terminal, with two tracks and an island platform. It is one of the three best-preserved stations on the line, the other two being Port Richmond and the line's western terminus at Arlington, in Mariners Harbor.

== History ==
The station opened on February 23, 1886. Formerly a surface station, it and the Port Richmond station one stop east were elevated onto the current concrete trestle in 1935 as part of an SIRT grade crossing elimination project, opening as an elevated station on February 25, 1937. West of the station past Nicholas Avenue, the line recedes into an open-cut. Tower Hill station closed on March 31, 1953, along with the South Beach Branch and the rest of the North Shore Branch.

== Station layout ==
P Platform level	Westbound	Trackbed
P Platform level	Island platform, not in use
P Platform level	Eastbound	Trackbed
G	Street level	Exit/Entrance

It is one of the few stations along the North Shore Branch still standing, although in ruins.

Like the nearby Port Richmond station, the station has a concrete island platform with a metal canopy and street staircases at both ends of the platform. The westernmost exit is at Treadwell Avenue. The easternmost exit is just east of Sharpe Avenue on private property, leading to an empty lot on Grove Avenue.
