= Sailors' Snug Harbor station =

Former Staten Island Railway station

Sailors' Snug Harbor
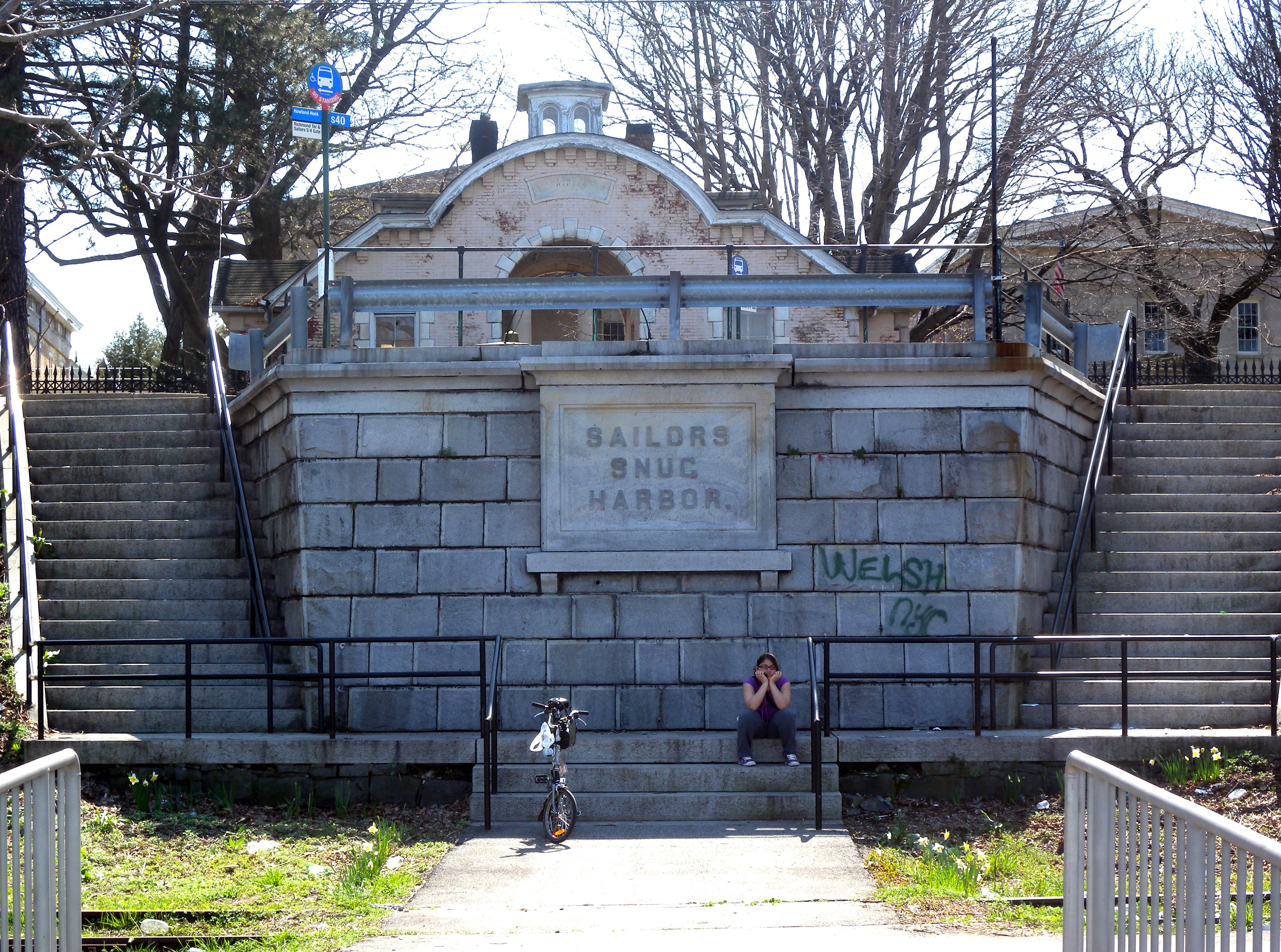

General information
- Location: Livingston; Sailors' Snug Harbor, Staten Island
- Coordinates: 40.6453°N 74.1017°W
- Line: North Shore Branch
- Platforms: 2 side platforms
- Tracks: 2

History
- Opened: February 23, 1886; 140 years ago
- Closed: March 31, 1953; 73 years ago

Former services
Preceding station	Staten Island Railway	Following station
Livingston toward Port Ivory	North Shore Branch	New Brighton toward St. George
Location

The Sailors' Snug Harbor station is a former station on the abandoned North Shore Branch of the Staten Island Railway. It had two tracks and two side platforms. Located in the Livingston section of Staten Island north of Richmond Terrace, the station was approximately 1.2 miles (1.9 km) from Saint George Terminal. It is at the northernmost end of the Snug Harbor Cultural Center and Botanical Garden.

== History ==
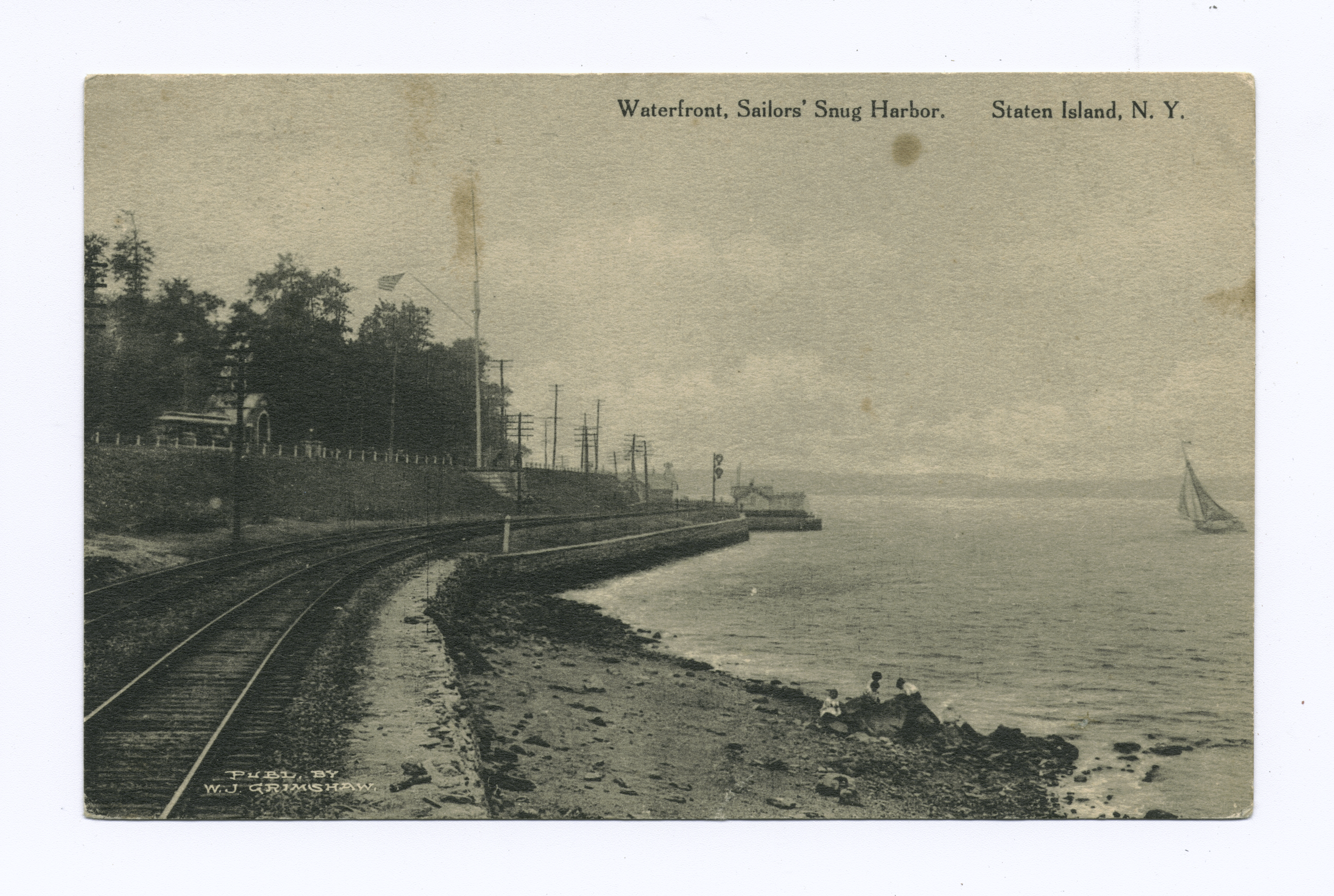
Early 20th century postcard

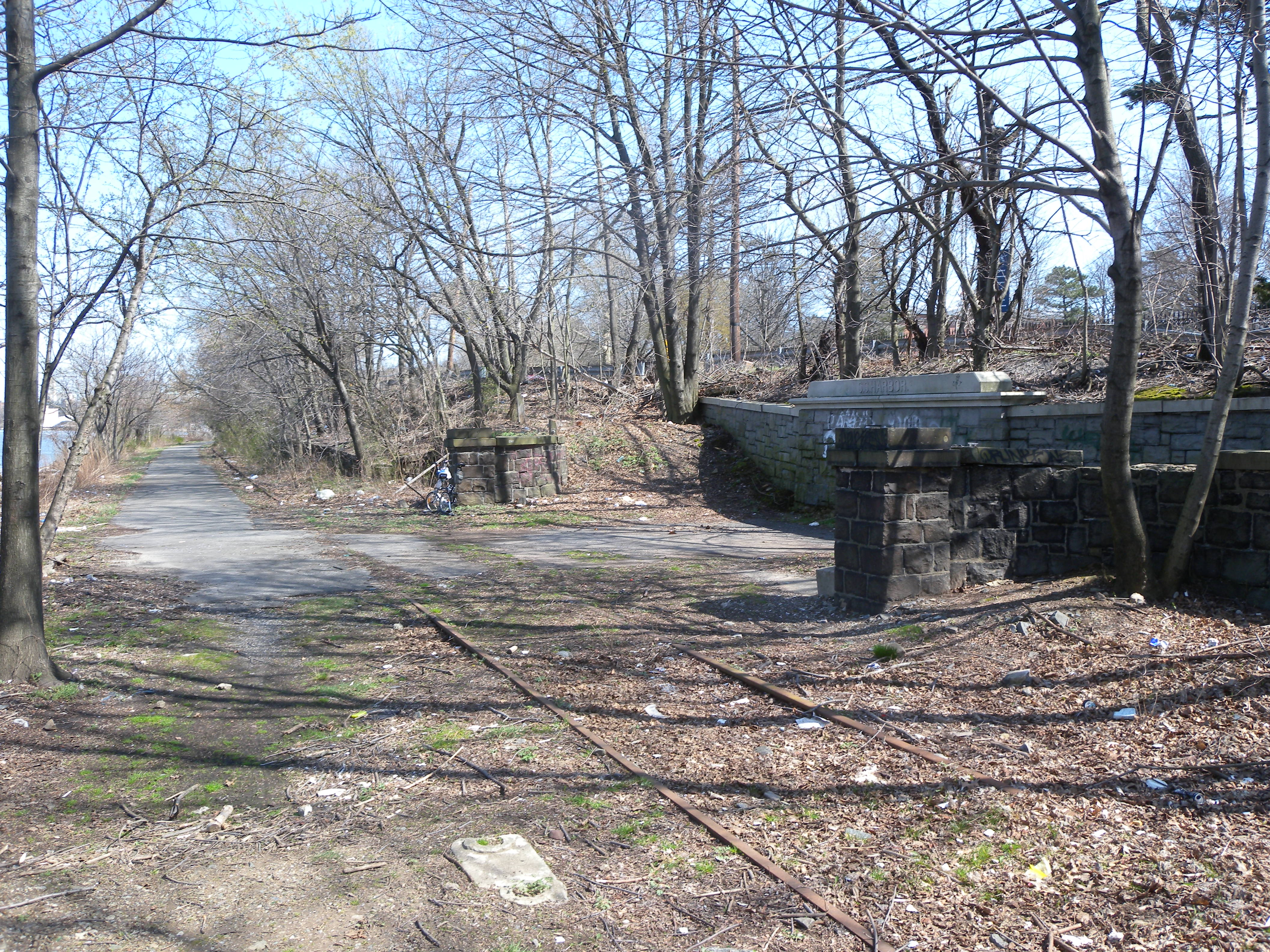
One track has become a short Greenway; the other is abandoned in place

The station opened on February 23, 1886. The station was located on a wooden trestle on the shore of the Kill Van Kull on the edge of the island below street level. It was built with two slightly staggered wooden high-level side platforms which could only fit one train car; the north Arlington-bound platform had direct access to the docks of the harbor. Exit stairs and the overpass to Richmond Terrace were located at the east end of the station. The station was closed on March 31, 1953, along with all other stations on the North Shore Branch.

=== Current status ===
While the platforms of the station have been removed, the two stairways leading down to the former station and dock, and the retaining wall between the stairways, inscribed as "Sailors Snug Harbor" still stand today. Another retaining wall inscribed as "S. S. Harbor" and ramp stand about 700 ft (200 m) west of here. The northern of the two tracks has been taken up and the right-of-way between these two points paved for recreational use.

Sailors' Snug Harbor is one of the stations to be returned to operation under the proposals for reactivation of the North Shore branch for rapid transit, light rail, or bus rapid transit service. It would be an events only stop serving the cultural center, or an alternative to reactivating the New Brighton station one stop east.
