= Mariners' Harbor station =

Former Staten Island Railway station

Mariners' Harbor
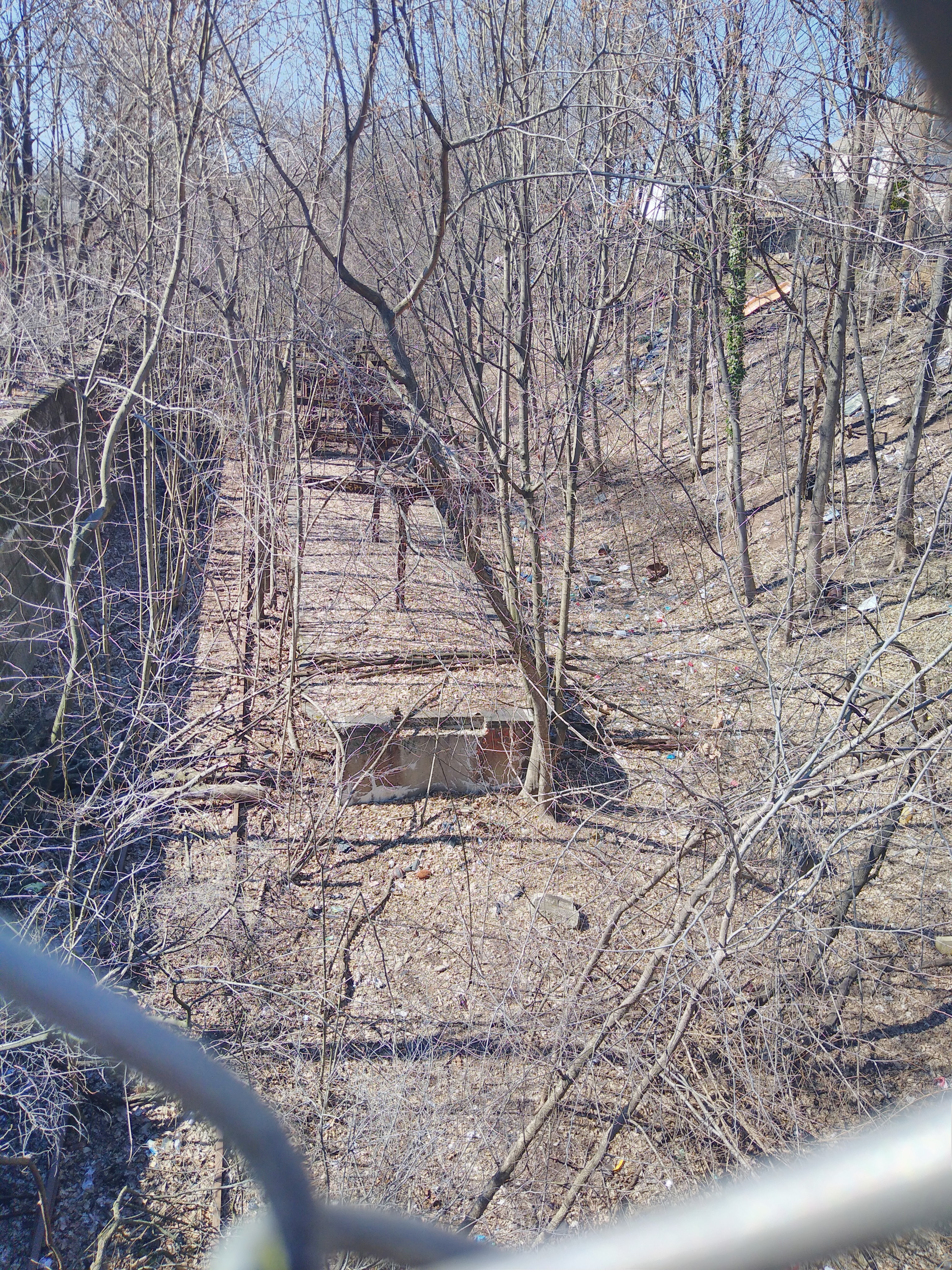
- From Van Pelt Avenue overpass, 2020

General information
- Location: Mariners Harbor, Staten Island
- Coordinates: 40.6339°N 74.1552°W
- Line: North Shore Branch
- Platforms: 1 island platform
- Tracks: 2

History
- Opened: Summer 1886; 140 years ago
- Closed: March 31, 1953; 73 years ago
- Former names: Erastina

Former services
Preceding station	Staten Island Railway	Following station
Harbor Road toward Port Ivory	North Shore Branch	Lake Avenue toward St. George
Location

Mariners' Harbor is a station on the abandoned North Shore Branch of the Staten Island Railway. It had two tracks (currently a single, abandoned and overgrown track) and one island platform. It is located in an open cut in the Staten Island neighborhood of Mariners Harbor at Van Pelt Avenue, about 4.6 miles (7.4 km) from the Saint George terminal.

== History ==
The station opened in summer 1886, as Erastina as part of an extension of the North Shore Branch west to Arlington. Buffalo Bill Cody named Erastina after Erastus Wiman, who helped consolidate Staten Island's rail lines, and helped build Saint George Terminal, the North Shore Branch, and the South Beach Branch. The nearby street Erastina Place retains this name today. Vacant land nearby was used for staging Buffalo Bill’s “Wild West Show”, generating over 10,000 additional passengers from the St. George Ferry Terminal over the line. The neighborhood was renamed when he fell out of public favor due to scandal and bankruptcy.

During the 1930s the station was depressed from grade-level into the current open cut, rebuilt with a concrete island platform with a metal canopy extending across the platform's length. A switch between the two tracks was located east of the station.

The station was abandoned on March 31, 1953, along with the South Beach Branch and the rest of the North Shore Branch. It is the westernmost station along the North Shore line which still stands as of 2010, although in unusable condition. The open-cut is overgrown, while the only remnants of the canopy are its support beams. There is a closed gate to the station at Linden Avenue between Van Pelt Avenue and Maple Parkway.

Mariner's Harbor is one of the stations to be returned to operation under the proposals for reactivation of the North Shore branch for rapid transit, light rail, or bus rapid transit service.

== Station layout ==
G	Street Level	-
P Former platform level	Westbound	Trackbed
P Former platform level	Island platform, not in use
P Former platform level	Eastbound	Trackbed
