= Arlington, Staten Island =

Neighborhood in New York City

Coordinates: 40°38′09″N 74°09′58″W

Arlington is a neighborhood on the North Shore of Staten Island in New York City. It is a subsection of the Mariners' Harbor neighborhood, located north of the North Shore Branch, and west of Harbor Road. Arlington was given its name by Civil War veteran and resident Moses Henry Leman, in recognition of Arlington National Cemetery.

Arlington is the location of the Arlington Terrace Apartments on Holland Avenue.

== Transportation ==
Until March 31, 1953, Arlington was served by the Arlington station of the Staten Island Railway. Arlington is served by the S40, S46 and S48 local bus routes (and their rush-hour-only limited-stop counterparts, which are S90, S96 and S98 respectively). Express bus routes in Arlington are the SIM33 and SIM34.

== Education ==
Arlington residents are generally zoned for P.S. 44 (in Mariners' Harbor) and I.S. 72 in Heartland Village. Nearby schools also include P.S. 22 and I.S. 51. The local high school is Port Richmond High School.

A branch of the New York Public Library, located at 206 South Avenue, was scheduled for completion in 2011 but actually opened on December 16, 2013.

== Demographics ==
For census purposes, the New York City Department of City Planning classifies Arlington as part of a larger Neighborhood Tabulation Area called Mariner's Harbor-Arlington-Graniteville SI0107. This designated neighborhood had 33,492 inhabitants based on data from the 2020 United States Census. This was an increase of 2,018 persons (6.4%) from the 31,474 counted in 2010. The neighborhood had a population density of 35.2 inhabitants per acre (14,500/sq mi; 5,600/km^{2}).

The racial makeup of the neighborhood was 19.8% (6,618) White (Non-Hispanic), 29.4% (9,853) Black (Non-Hispanic), 10.9% (3,659) Asian, and 4.4% (1,452) from two or more races. Hispanic or Latino of any race were 35.6% (11,910) of the population.

According to the 2020 United States Census, this area has many cultural communities of over 1,000 inhabitants. This include residents who identify as Mexican, Puerto Rican, Dominican, Irish, Italian, Chinese, and African-American.

The largest age group was people 5-19 years old, which made up 22.2% of the residents. 74.5% of the households had at least one family present. Out of the 10,640 households, 40.9% had a married couple (18.1% with a child under 18), 5.7% had a cohabiting couple (2.9% with a child under 18), 17.9% had a single male (2.1% with a child under 18), and 35.5% had a single female (10.9% with a child under 18). 41.4% of households had children under 18. In this neighborhood, 70.2% of non-vacant housing units are renter-occupied.

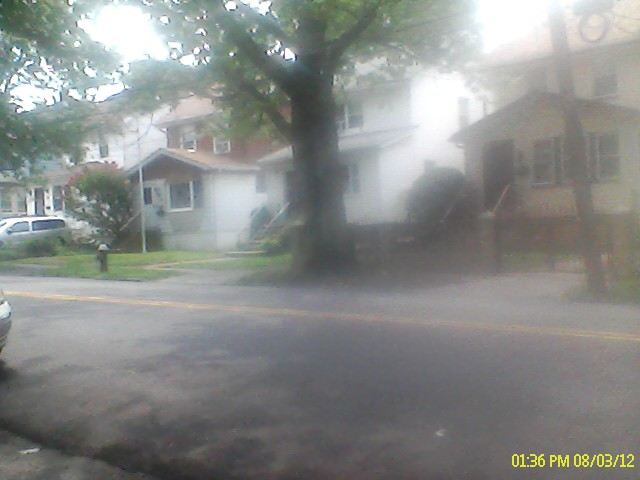
Houses along South Avenue in Arlington

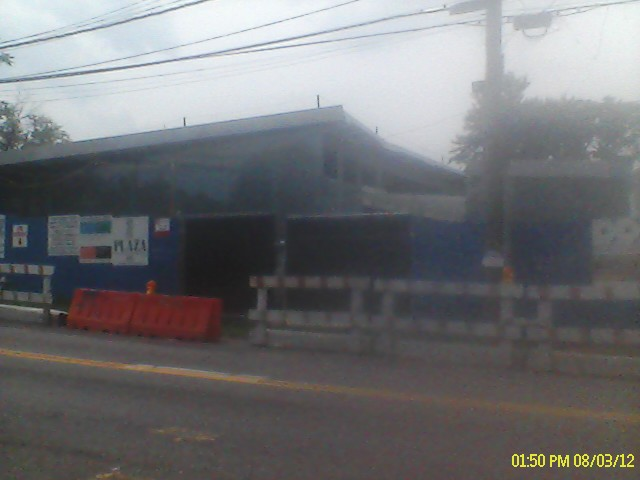
The Mariners' Harbor Library on South Avenue, under construction

== Notable residents ==
- Debi Rose, former New York City Councilwoman
