= Elm Park station =

Elm Park station may refer to:

- Elm Park station (Staten Island Railway), a rapid transit station on the Staten Island Railway
- Elm Park tube station, a tube station in London
