= Lake Avenue =

Lake Avenue may refer to:

- Lake Avenue (Baltimore)
- Lake Avenue (Pasadena)
- Florida State Road 802 in Palm Beach County, locally known east as Lake Avenue
- Lake Avenue (Staten Island Railway station)
