= Arthur Kill Rail Bridge =

Arthur Kill Rail Bridge may refer to either of two railroad bridges connecting New Jersey to Staten Island:

- Arthur Kill Bridge (1890–1959)
- Arthur Kill Vertical Lift Bridge (1959–present)
