= Old Place, Staten Island =

Neighborhood in New York City

Coordinates: 40.627°N 74.173°W

On a 1911 map

Old Place is a neighborhood located in the northwestern section of Staten Island. The neighborhood is located south of Arlington, and west of Mariners Harbor. It is part of Community Board 1.

== Features ==
The neighborhood has a United Artists movie theater along Forest Avenue, and a Home Depot across the street. There are a few homes along Forest Avenue, but other than that, the only other residential units are the Goethals Homes, located along Goethals Road North just west of Forest Avenue.

There are plans in the future to develop the area with 3-4 story buildings with retail on the ground floor and residential units on the upper floors, with access to the surrounding wetlands.

== Demographics ==
As of the 2010 census, the demographics of Old Place were roughly as follows:

50.4% White, 5.4% Black, 38.5% Hispanic, 3.3% Asian, 2.4% Other.

This is defining Old Place as everything within the boundaries of Census Tract 323 south of the railroad tracks.

== Transportation ==
Old Place is served by the S40 bus and its rush-hour-only limited-stop counterpart, the S90 bus.
