= Harbor Road station =

Former Staten Island Railway station

Harbor Road

General information
- Location: Staten Island
- Coordinates: 40.6338°N 74.1601°W
- Line: North Shore Branch
- Platforms: 1 island platform
- Tracks: 2

History
- Opened: 1935 – 1937
- Closed: March 31, 1953; 73 years ago

Former services
Preceding station	Staten Island Railway	Following station
Arlington toward Port Ivory	North Shore Branch	Mariners' Harbor toward St. George
Location

Harbor Road was a station on the abandoned North Shore Branch of the Staten Island Railway in Mariners Harbor, Staten Island, New York. The station, located under the overpass at the highest point of Harbor Road, was built in an open-cut with two tracks and one island platform. It was located 4.9 miles (7.9 km) from the Saint George terminal. The station was opened during the SIRT grade crossing elimination project of 1935 – 1937. It closed on March 31, 1953, along with the South Beach Branch and the rest of the North Shore Branch. The station was demolished in 2004 during a reconstruction of the rail system for reactivated freight service by the nearby Howland Hook Marine Terminal.
