= Lake Avenue station =

Former Staten Island Railway station

Lake Avenue
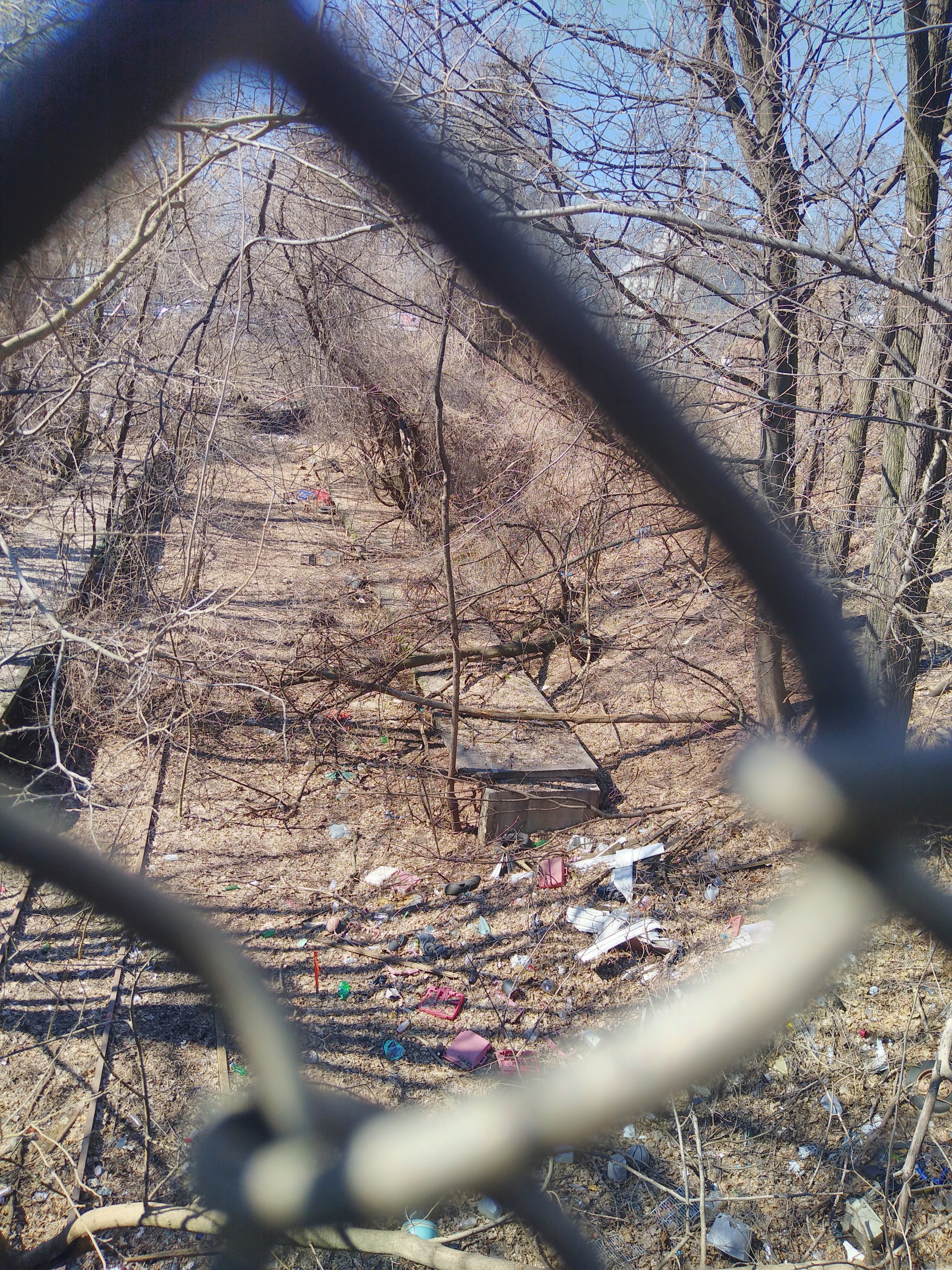
- Station site in 2020

General information
- Location: Staten Island
- Coordinates: 40.6341°N 74.1511°W
- Line: North Shore Branch
- Platforms: 2 side platforms
- Tracks: 2

History
- Opened: 1937; 89 years ago
- Closed: March 31, 1953; 73 years ago

Former services
Preceding station	Staten Island Railway	Following station
Mariners' Harbor toward Port Ivory	North Shore Branch	Elm Park toward St. George
Location

Lake Avenue is a station on the abandoned North Shore Branch of the Staten Island Railway in Mariners Harbor, Staten Island, New York. It has two tracks and two side platforms. It is located in an open cut, approximately 4.3 miles (6.9 km) from Saint George Terminal.

== History ==
The station opened in 1937 during a grade crossing elimination project. The station was abandoned on March 31, 1953, along with the South Beach Branch and the rest of the North Shore Branch. It is one of the few stations along the North Shore line which still stands as of 2020, although in ruins.
