= The Police Officer Rocco Laurie Intermediate School =

Public school in Staten Island, New York City, US

The Rocco Laurie Intermediate School - I.S. 72

Location
- 33 Ferndale Avenue; Staten Island, New York City, New York; United States; 40°35′33.05″N 74°9′31.17″W

Information
- Type: Public Type 1 school
- Motto: RESPECT, LOYALTY, SERVICE
- Established: 1975
- Principal: Jessica Jackson
- Grades: 6–8
- Enrollment: 1618
- Colors: Blue and Orange
- Mascot: Bulldogs
- Nickname: Rocco Laurie Bulldogs

The Rocco Laurie Intermediate School refers to New York City Intermediate School 72 in Staten Island, New York. It is a Title I school. It is located at 33 Ferndale Avenue in Heartland Village, Staten Island. Heartland Village is part of New Springville, Staten Island. The school was named after P.O. Rocco Laurie and is across the street from Public School 69.

== History ==
The school opened in 1975 and has served approximately 2000 students annually. It is named after NYPD Police Officer Rocco Laurie who was killed in line-of-duty in Manhattan, along with his partner Greg Foster. Both Laurie and Foster served in the United States Marine Corps during the Vietnam War.

Stanley Katzman was the school's first principal. After his retirement, Peter Maccelarri, a Vietnam War veteran, would administer the school for more than 10 years. There are 4 assistant principals (one from each floor), and the Principal's Office is on the first floor. After more than 20 years, the school was structured in a way where as each floor is divided by the foreign language the student chooses via a formal letter (typically, students are grouped in classes by the foreign language elective they choose).

The school effectively began its ARISTA Junior High School honor services in 2003. Around the same time at the beginning of ARISTA, the famed Bulldog Statue would be built under the administration of Peter Maccelarri.

Now, effective of 2019, the first-floor services all grades, the second services the 6th grade, the third services students of 7th grade, and the fourth floor services the 8th grade. Each floor has its own set of AP's, Deans and guidance counselors. It originally started with equal separation, as in the grades were divided somewhat equally, among each of the floors.

The school would then honor Police Officer Rafael Ramos, as he had worked in the school as security before his shift to being an active police officer. He, and his partner Wenjian Liu were killed on December 20, 2014, in Brooklyn through fatal blows through the head and upper body from a shooter. He will be always remembered.

As of 2024, Jessica Jackson, former principal and teacher of P.S. 69 over Merrymount Street, now holds administration of the school, changing it from the times of Maccelarri's administration.

== ARISTA Information ==
ARISTA, a program developed and administrated by Spanish teacher K. Majersky and Social Studies teacher M. Breslauer, is intended to honor those who are hard-working and academically prosperous through access to more trips than the common 8th grade student and through an initiation ceremony held normally in May or Early June.

Requirements

It is required that you maintain an 90 or above average in all subjected classes, including electives such as Band, Spanish, Chorus, etc. in order to maintain probability to enter such a prosperous and well-known program. Suspension, at least once, will severely limit your chances in entrance of the program, same to bad behavior.

You will also require signatures from teachers and proper, administrative staff, and actions that are deemed helpful to your society and your neighborhood, along with proof of said action through signature.

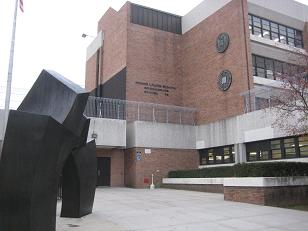
The front of school

== Trivia ==
- In 1982, Principal Stanley Katzman appeared on Late Night with David Letterman.
- Emma Stone visited the school on June 25, 2012 for the school's involvement in Penny Harvest.
