= Elm Park, Staten Island =

Small park in New York City

Coordinates: 40°37′52″N 74°08′19″W

Elm Park is a small park in the Port Richmond section of Staten Island, one of the five boroughs of New York City, United States. The park is located across Innis Street from Port Richmond High School.

The name "Elm Park" is sometimes used to denote the area from its namesake westward for several blocks, lending its name to the former Elm Park Station on the North Shore Branch of the Staten Island Railway. The station was situated directly beneath Morningstar Road. Passenger service on this branch of the railway was halted in 1953; a dilapidated remnant of the station's platform still exists, but the stairways leading to the street have been removed.

At various times, the neighborhood was known as Jacksonville (c. 1830) and Lowville (c. 1850). Its present name was given to it by a local physician, Dr. John T. Harrison, and refers to the elm trees that could be found on the doctor's estate.

The last exit on New York State Route 440 before the Bayonne Bridge is in Elm Park, which also contains one of two Catholic cemeteries on Staten Island named St. Mary's Cemetery; the other cemetery, located in Grasmere, is much larger than the Elm Park cemetery. This often causes confusion.

In 2008 Senator Charles Schumer and other Staten Island representatives proposed a Park and Ride under the bridge, for users of bus service to Bayonne, New Jersey. Residents have been opposed to this move, yet local businesses, according to the Staten Island Advance, support it.

== Demographics ==
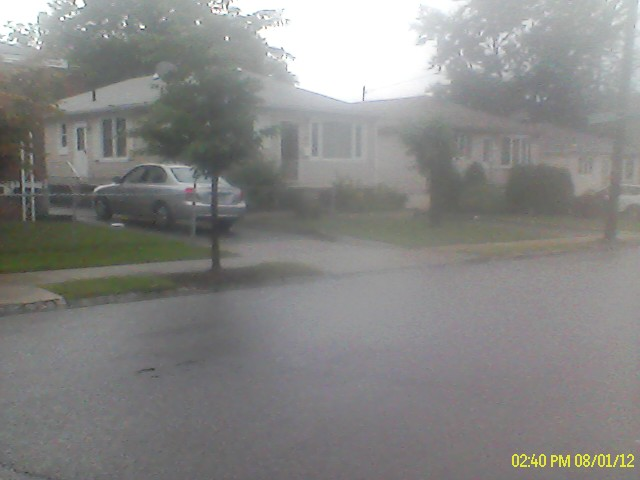
A residential street in the southern part of Elm Park.

In the early 20th Century a large number of Polish-American families settled in Elm Park, and they still constitute about a fifth of its population; many of these families are parishioners of St. Adalbert's Church, a Roman Catholic church located in the community, which later received some African-American and Hispanic arrivals, particularly in the westernmost blocks bordering Mariners Harbor. As of the 2010 census, the area was 43.2% Hispanic, 24.1% White, 23.1% Black, 7% Asian, and 2.6% Other This is using a definition of Census Tract 239, and Block Group 2 of Tract 223.

== Transportation ==
Elm Park was served by the Staten Island Railway's North Shore Branch at Elm Park, until it closed in 1953.

Elm Park is served by S40, S44, S89, S90, S94.

== Education ==
Most public school students in Elm Park are zoned to the following schools:

- P.S. 21
- P.S. 22
- I.S. 51
- Port Richmond High School
