= Elm Park station (Staten Island Railway) =

Former Staten Island Railway station

Elm Park
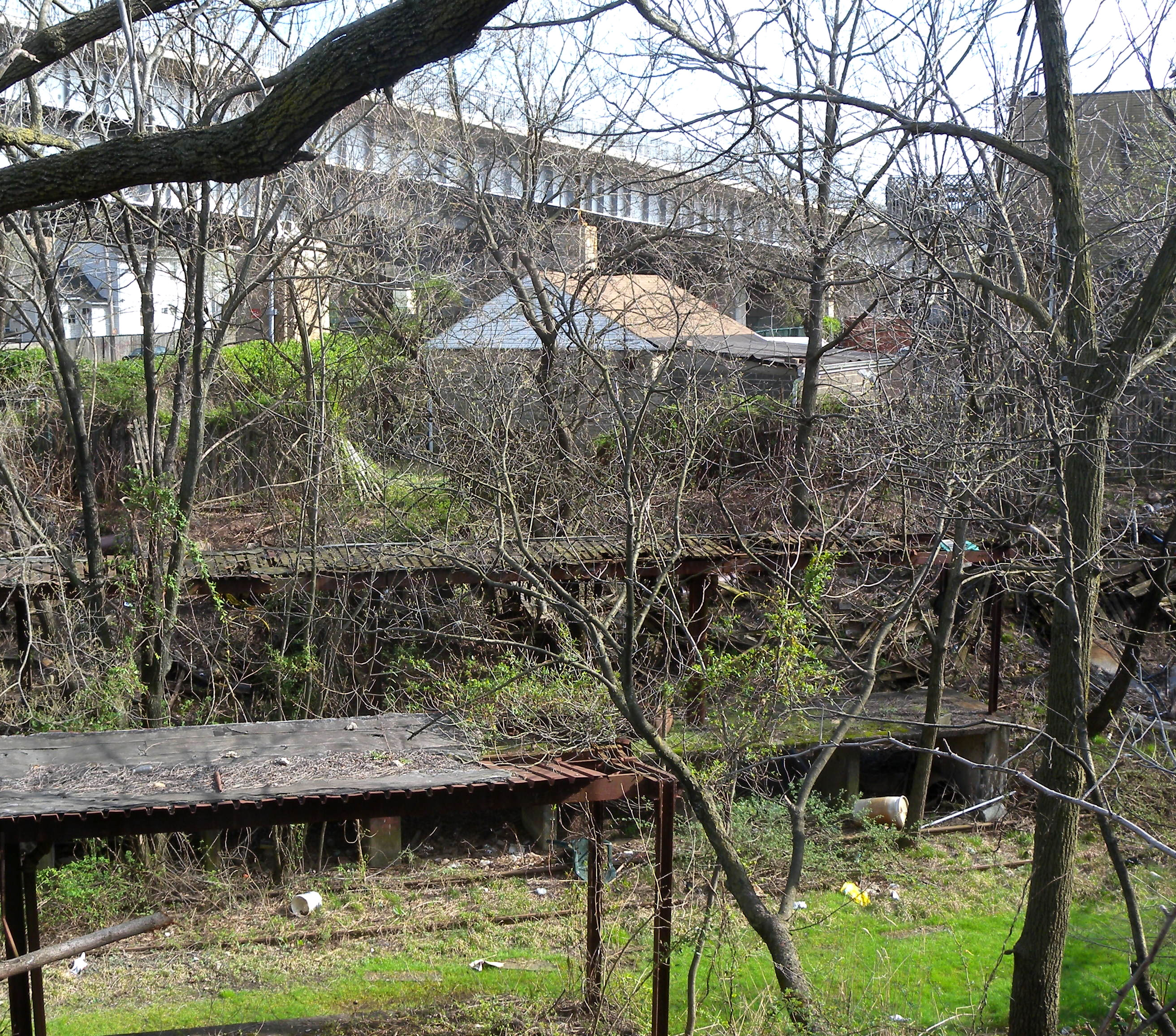
- Western part of Elm Park station, 2010

General information
- Location: Staten Island
- Coordinates: 40.6351°N 74.1456°W
- Line: North Shore Branch
- Platforms: 2 side platforms
- Tracks: 2

History
- Opened: February 23, 1886; 140 years ago
- Closed: March 31, 1953; 73 years ago
- Former names: Elm Park−Morningstar Road

Former services
Preceding station	Staten Island Railway	Following station
Lake Avenue toward Port Ivory	North Shore Branch	Tower Hill toward St. George
Location

Elm Park is a station on the abandoned North Shore Branch of the Staten Island Railway (SIR). The station is located in an open cut under the Bayonne Bridge approach in Elm Park, Staten Island, at Morningstar Road between Innis Street and Newark Avenue. It has two tracks and two side platforms. The station is approximately 3.9 miles (6.3 km) from the Saint George terminal of the SIR.

== History ==
The station opened on February 23, 1886, as a surface station. In the early 1930s as part of a grade crossing elimination project, the station was depressed into the current open-cut below grade level, and rebuilt with concrete platforms. Elm Park was closed on March 31, 1953, along with the South Beach Branch and the rest of the North Shore Branch.

It is one of the stations to be returned to operation under the proposals for reactivation of the North Shore branch for rapid transit, light rail, or bus rapid transit service.

== Station layout ==
G	Street Level	-
P Former platform level	Side platform, not in use
P Former platform level	Northbound	Trackbed
P Former platform level	Southbound	Trackbed
P Former platform level	Side platform, not in use

The platforms are slightly offset due to the right-of-way crossing at a diagonal with the streets in the neighborhood; each measures about 240 feet (73 m) in length, which would fit three cars of the former ME-1 rolling stock (67 feet in length) or of the current R44 SIR cars (75 feet in length). Exit stairs were located at the west end of the station towards Morningstar Road. An overpass from Eaton Place to Newark Avenue over the line (not connected to the station) was located at the station's east end under the Bayonne Bridge. East of the station past John Street, the line rises onto a concrete trestle built in 1935.

Elm Park is one of several stations along the North Shore line still standing today, although the street staircases have been taken up and the former platforms are severely dilapidated, while the line's open cut is overgrown with vegetation. Only a single track — the St. George-bound track — remains, unelectrified and in ruins.
