= Port Richmond High School =

Public school in New York City

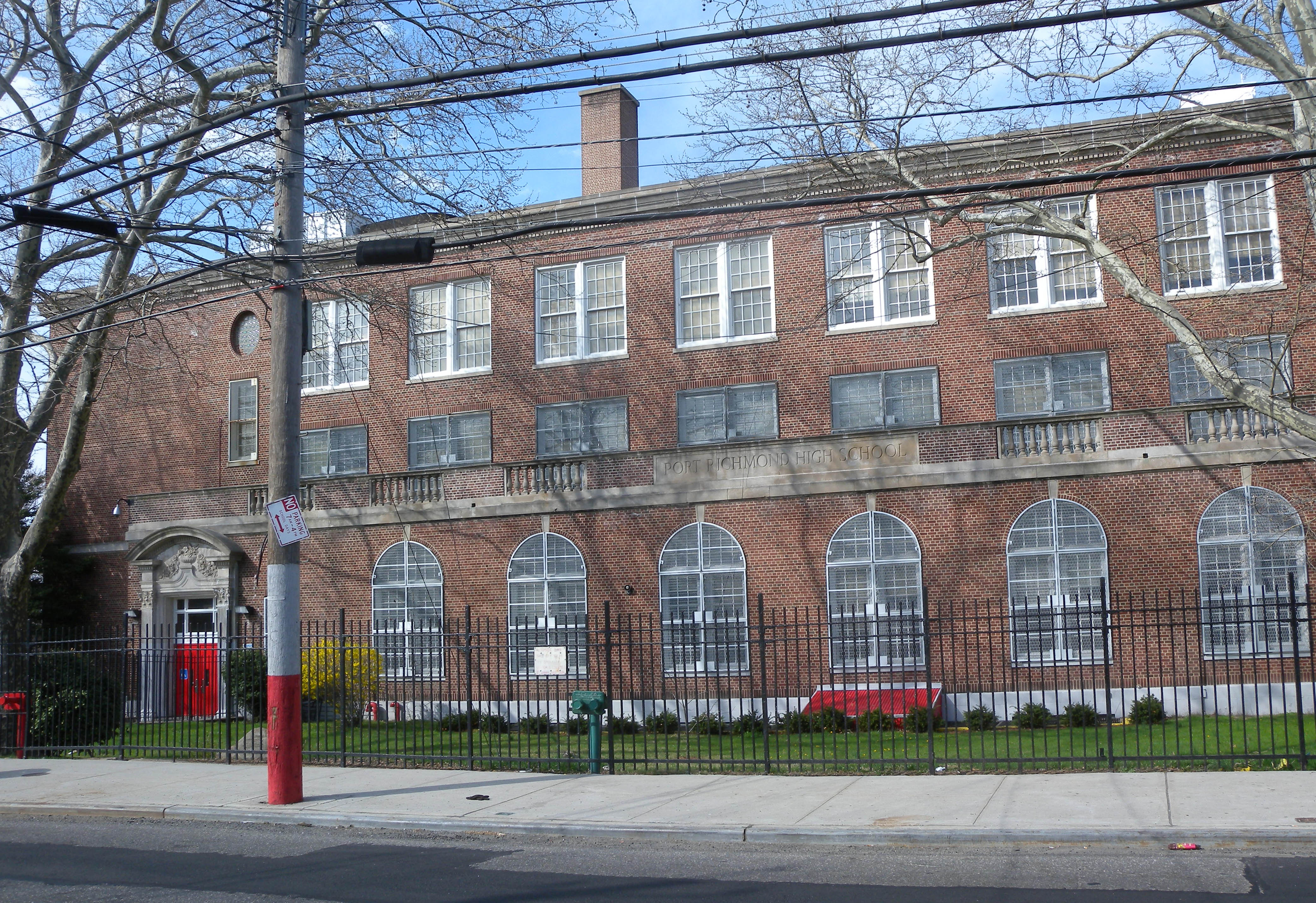

Location
- 85 St Josephs Ave; Staten Island, New York 10302; United States; 40°38′4″N 74°8′34″W

Information
- Type: Public
- Established: 1928
- NCES School ID: 360010302850
- Principal: Andrew Greenfield
- Teaching staff: 137.34 (on an FTE basis)
- Grades: 9-12
- Enrollment: 1,693 (2022-2023)
- Student to teacher ratio: 12.33
- Campus: City: Large
- Colors: Red and White
- Mascot: Raiders
- Yearbook: Soundings
- Website: www.portrichmondhs.org

Port Richmond High School is a public high school on the North Shore of Staten Island, New York City, New York. It is located in the Elm Park neighborhood, at 85 St Josephs Avenue between Innis Street and Charles Avenue. It has approximately 100 full-time teachers and a student-to-teacher ratio of 21.5.

The school serves grades 9-12, and offers JROTC, Business, Culinary Arts, Medical Technology, and TV Media specialty programs. Students eligible for the "Gateway to Higher Education" and "Collegiate Academy" Honors programs may take accelerated courses, and college-level Advanced Placement coursework. There are periods 0–9 in this school. Freshmen and Sophomores are usually 1–8. Period 0 is used for JROTC, and College Now classes where students can earn college credits. Two state-of-the-art STEAM Labs (Science-Technology-Engineering-Art-Math) opened in 2019, complete with access to Apple technologies, 3D printing and engraving, LEGO robotics, virtual reality, stained glass making, machining and woodworking.

== History ==
The school was founded in 1928.

On June 25, 2018, Oneatha Swinton was removed from her position as principal after being charged with insurance fraud. She was accused of ending the honors program, misappropriation of the school budget, cronyism, as well as various other charges by the staff, parents and the community.

On May 19, 2021, long-time teacher, staff member, and assistant principal of the History department, Lisa Pollari, died due to complications from a long battle with cancer, a few months before her 50th birthday. On November 18, 2023, a street naming ceremony was held, during which the street where the school resides, St. Joseph's Ave, was honorarily renamed to Lisa Pollari Way. The ceremony was attended by Pollari's family, staff members, alumni, and U.S. Representative Nicole Malliotakis.

In September 2023, the school completed work on a multi-million dollar athletic complex. The project was started in October 2019, and consisted of a brand new turf football, baseball, soccer, and lacrosse fields, as well as a new track and five new tennis courts. The project was initially estimated to be completed by July 2021, but work was significantly delayed due to effects of the COVID-19 pandemic. Totals costs were over $20 million. The ribbon-cutting ceremony was attended by Councilman David Carr, State Senator Jessica Scarcella-Spanton, Assemblyman Charles Fall, and Director of Professional Development & Special Projects at PSAL Daniel Harris. Fall in particular was commended for his contributions to the project, with his office finding funding for several unforeseen expenses that arose from construction.

=== Changes to school mascot ===
The original mascot of the school from the 1920s to 1940s was the Red Raider. At some point in the 1940's, the school changed their mascot to the Minstrels, a term associated with 19th and early 20th century comedy shows where White actors would wear blackface to portray harmful stereotypes about African-Americans. This was apparently due to the school's muddy football field, which often gave players' faces a brown coloring.

In 1986, the student body voted to change the mascot back to the original Red Raider. What they didn't know, was that the original mascot name also referred to a racial stereotype. "Red raider" was a derogatory term used to describe Native Americans who sided with the Confederacy during the American Civil War.

In April 2001, State Education Commissioner Richard Mills urged all public high schools to drop the generations-old use of Native American terms and symbols for school nicknames and mascots. The Port Richmond mascot was changed to be simply, the Raiders.

== Demographics ==
The school is diverse, at 24.3% White, 30.6% Black, 7.0% Asian, and 37.8% Hispanic. Over half of the students receive a free or discounted lunch. In 2011–12, the school has significantly more freshman students than any other grade — nearly twice as many freshman as sophomores, and nearly half the total population is freshmen; juniors and seniors (combined) represented only one-third of the population.

== National Honors Society (ARISTA) ==
Any student in the third or fourth year who has attained an average of 90% or over the preceding year, and has met the service requirements by giving service to the school and the community is eligible for nomination to the National Honors Society. An overall average below ninety will result in probation and eventually removal from the program.

== Notable alumni ==
- Jeffrey Citron, Chairman of Vonage
- George Genovese, former MLB player and scout
- Reinaldo Marcus Green, filmmaker
- David Johansen, aka Buster Poindexter, singer/songwriter, founder New York Dolls
- Steven Matteo, New York City Councilman
- Debi Rose, New York City Councilwoman. She was Vice President of her senior class.
- Peter Rossomando, American football coach
- Bill Shakespeare, College Football Hall of Famer
- Christopher Soriano Jr., rapper better known by his stage name CJ
- Jeff Stoutland, offensive line coach for the Philadelphia Eagles of the National Football League (NFL)
- Paul Zindel, Author
