= Arlington station (Staten Island Railway) =

Former Staten Island Railway station

Arlington

General information
- Location: Arlington, Staten Island
- Coordinates: 40.6335°N 74.1661°W
- Line: North Shore Branch
- Platforms: 1 island platform
- Tracks: 2

History
- Opened: 1889–1890
- Closed: March 31, 1953; 73 years ago
- Former names: Arlington − South Avenue

Former services
Preceding station	Staten Island Railway	Following station
Port Ivory Terminus	North Shore Branch	Harbor Road toward St. George
Location

Arlington was a station on the abandoned North Shore Branch of the Staten Island Railway, in Staten Island, New York. Located in an open-cut 5.2 miles (8.4 km) from the St. George Terminal, it had two tracks and one island platform. For a few years before its closure in 1953, it was the western (railroad direction south) terminus of the North Shore Line; before then, the terminus was the Port Ivory station to the west, though most trains terminated at Arlington. It was located in the Arlington and Mariners Harbor sections of Staten Island, near the Arlington Yard, under the South Avenue overpass, between Arlington Place and Brabant Street.

== History ==
The station was put up at the South Avenue grade crossing in 1889–1890. This location was where trains were turned on their way back to Saint George. The name of the neighborhood Arlington was coined after the Baltimore and Ohio Railroad (B&O) purchased a farm at Old Place, on Staten Island's northwestern corner, which would become the Arlington freight yard. The B&O renamed the area Arlington. The station originally consisted of two wooden side platforms with a stationhouse at the east end of the St. George-bound platform and ramps to South Avenue. A wooden overpass to the side of the right-of-way was located at the west end. Non-electrified freight sidings were located on both sides of the station, with a switch to the northernmost track located in the center of the station. The station was closed on March 31, 1953, along with the rest of the North Shore Branch and the South Beach Branch.

The station site is currently occupied by tail tracks for the reactivated Arlington freight yard, which began serving the Howland Hook Marine Terminal in 2005. Because of this, the former station was demolished. Arlington is one of the stations to be returned to operation under the proposals for reactivation of the North Shore branch for rapid transit, light rail, or bus rapid transit service. Any new service would require a physical separation from the current freight tracks. A new terminal station has been proposed south of the original site along South Avenue between Brabant Street and Continental Place, along with a second nearby station for a proposed West Shore service at Forest Avenue.
