= Staten Island light rail =

Proposed transit lines in New York City

Staten Island light rail proposals refer to two projects in the New York City borough of Staten Island. These proposals are among the several light rail projects that have been floated in New York City in recent years. Neither proposal was funded in the Metropolitan Transportation Authority's 2015–2019 Capital Plan, but $4 million was allocated to a study for it.

== North Shore ==
The North Shore Light Rail line is a proposed 5-mile (8.0 km) long light rail line (since turned into a bus rapid transit line) serving the northern portion of Staten Island along the abandoned right of way of the former Staten Island Railway's North Shore Branch. According to PlanNYC.org, which is affiliated with the Robert F. Wagner Graduate School of Public Service at New York University, "[t]he proposed five mile route, which would connect Arlington and the St. George Ferry Terminal, would cost $360 million, with funding coming from federal, state and local agencies. In order to move forward, the project will require a $4 million allocation from Congress for a feasibility study which is currently awaiting approval from the House Transportation Committee. A projection of 11,000–15,000 daily passengers would ride on the North Shore Light Rail if and when it is complete. This line would serve the North Shore.

An option that was considered was light rail transit, due to its ability to operate with cars in mixed traffic. There was a plan to run the line down South Avenue from the Arlington station to the Teleport. The line would rise to street level at Arlington. Due to freight trains laying up as far west as Union Avenue, the line would have to be physically separate from the freight line or the cars would have to be built to a higher crash standard. Comments included begin raising the line at Union Avenue, since it would have to go to street level anyway, to avoid interference with the freight line.

Some advocates of improved mass transit on the island oppose the plan, however, preferring instead the option of through service between Arlington and Tottenville via the existing Staten Island Railway, this made possible by the installation of the Ball Park loop in 2001 (since discontinued but still intact).

A 2012 alternatives analysis identified bus rapid transit (Select Bus Service) rather than light rail as the preferred alternative for the region. The bus service was eventually selected. About $356 million is needed to complete the line, which will run on the North Shore Branch right-of-way, adjacent to the Kill van Kull. $5 million was allocated in the 2015–2019 Capital Program for environmental and design work. In July 2018, the MTA indicated that it was retaining a consultant to advise on an environmental impact assessment for the bus rapid transit line on the North Shore Branch for $4.8 million. On May 8, 2019, the MTA held an open house on an updated version of the North Shore Alternatives Analysis study. The two alternatives from the study are being evaluated alongside other potential transit expansion and improvement projects in the city as part of the 2025-2044 Twenty-Year Needs Assessment, which is planned to be completed by October 1, 2023.

== West Shore and Kill van Kull ==
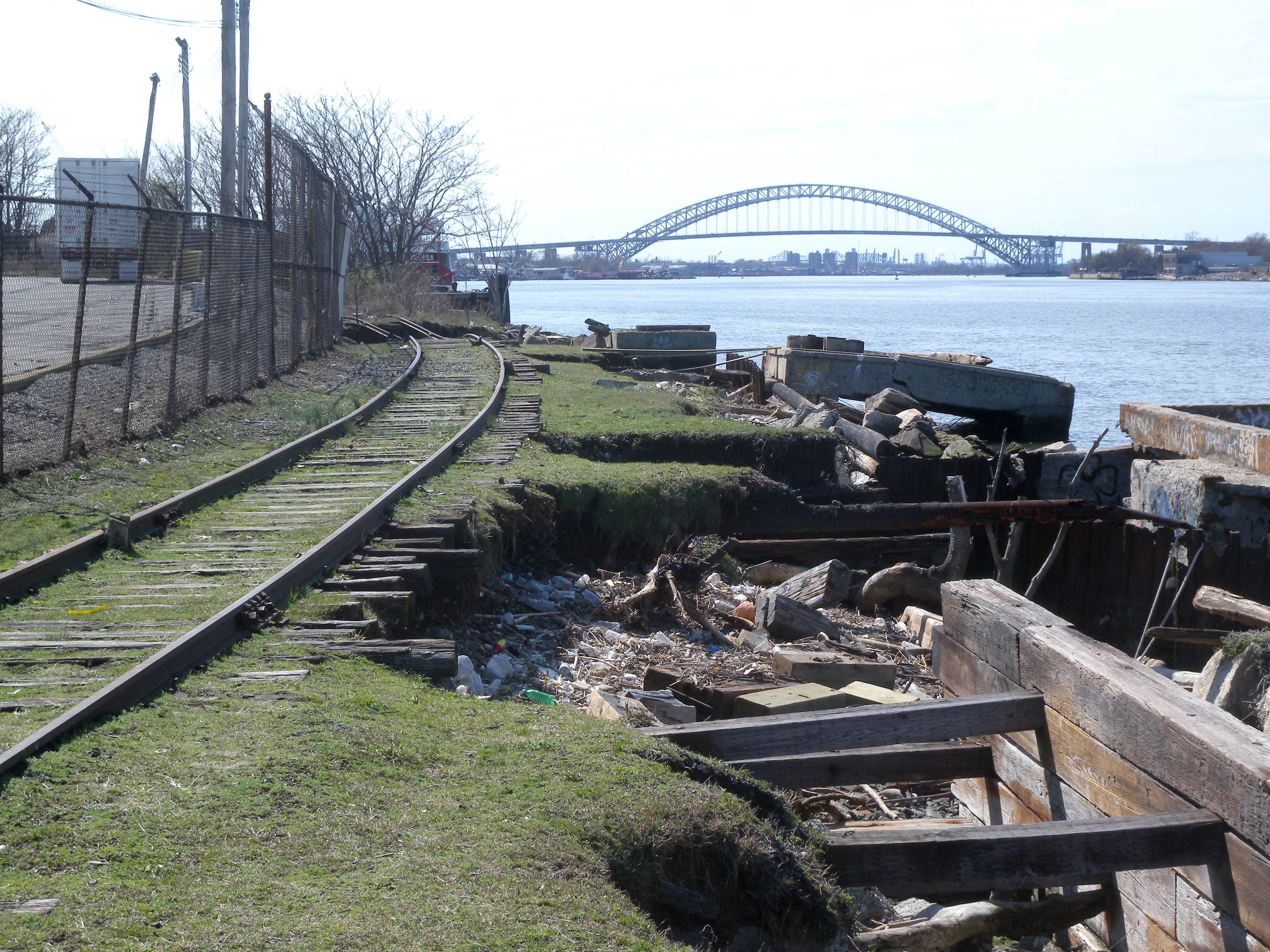
A line over the Bayonne Bridge could potentially connect to the Hudson-Bergen Light Rail.

The West Shore Light Rail is another proposed light rail project, which is 13.1 miles (21.1 km) long, and is being championed by the Staten Island Economic Development Corporation (SIEDC). Beginning at the South Shore, probably near a park-and-ride in Pleasant Plains, the proposed line would run along New York State Route 440, according to an alignment decision in March 2009. It would cross over the Bayonne Bridge to connect to the Hudson-Bergen Light Rail (HBLR) in Bayonne, New Jersey.

Construction of this line could begin as soon as 2018, and serve the new Freshkills Park, but SIEDC needs $5 million in funding to complete studies for the route of the line; a campaign to raise the $5 million failed previously, but was restarted in August 2014. The line would serve 9,000 more Staten Island workers, 65,000 more Staten Island residents, and 25,000 more households. As part of the 2015–2019 MTA Capital Program, $4 million has been allocated for the alternative analysis of light rail on the West Shore of Staten Island.

The first public open house was held on September 25, 2019. It was announced that four modes (Heavy Rail, Bus Rapid Transit, Light Rail, Select Bus Service) and three north-south corridors (Korean War Veterans Parkway and Richmond Avenue, West Shore Expressway, West Shore Expressway and Victory Boulevard) would be considered. 18 specific route alignments were considered.

For the West Shore Expressway option, eight alternatives were considered:

- 8th Street station on the HBLR to Tottenville via the Bayonne Bridge
- 8th Street station to Metropark station in Woodbridge Township, New Jersey via Bayonne Bridge and Outerbridge Crossing
- Elizabeth, New Jersey to Tottenville via Goethals Bridge
- Elizabeth, New Jersey to Metropark station via Goethals Bridge and Outerbridge Crossing
- Manhattan to Tottenville via Verrazzano–Narrows Bridge
- Manhattan to Metropark, New Jersey via Verrazzano–Narrows Bridge and Outerbridge Crossing
- St. George to Tottenville via North Shore BRT
- St. George to Metropark station via North Shore BRT and Outerbridge Crossing

For the West Shore Expressway and Victory Boulevard option, four alternatives were considered:

- 8th Street station on the HBLR to Tottenville via the Bayonne Bridge
- 8th Street station to Metropark station via Bayonne Bridge and Outerbridge Crossing
- Manhattan to Tottenville via Verrazzano–Narrows Bridge
- Manhattan to Metropark station via Verrazzano–Narrows Bridge and Outerbridge Crossing

For the Korean War Veterans Parkway and Richmond Avenue option, six alternatives were considered:

- 8th Street station on the HBLR to Tottenville via the Bayonne Bridge
- 8th Street station to Metropark station via Bayonne Bridge and Outerbridge Crossing
- Elizabeth, New Jersey to Tottenville via Goethals Bridge
- Elizabeth, New Jersey to Metropark station via Goethals Bridge and Outerbridge Crossing
- Manhattan to Tottenville via Verrazzano–Narrows Bridge
- Manhattan to Metropark station via Verrazzano–Narrows Bridge and Outerbridge Crossing

Alternatives from this long list were screened out based on whether they crossed multiple bridges, complimented other transit lines, served jobs and residents along the West Shore, and if right-of-way was available. Accordingly, options with two crossings off Staten Island were eliminated due to complexity of implementation, and the West Shore Expressway/Victory Boulevard corridor was dropped due to right-of-way constraints. All options were dropped for the Verrazzano–Narrows Bridge. Six options were kept under consideration for the recommended long list of alternatives. Bayonne Bridge or Goethals Bridge to Tottenville were kept for all modes via the West Shore Expressway, the two bus options were kept for St. George to Tottenville or the Outerbridge Crossing via the West Shore Expressway, and all but heavy rail were kept for Bayonne Bridge or Goethals Bridge to Totttenville via Korean War Veterans Parkway and Richmond Avenue.

At community board briefings in January 2020, it was announced that this list was reduced to two alternative, after additional screening factors were considered. These included whether they were supported by existing and planned land use, complimented North Shore BRT, and whether longer-term improvements could be implemented in phases. The two selected build options were both for BRT, and would not preclude their future conversion to light rail.

The first option would run between Newark Airport or St. George and Tottenville via the West Shore Expressway. Nine stops were proposed: Arthur Kill SIR station, Sharrots Road, Bloomingdale Road, Huguenot Avenue/Arthur Kill Road, Victory Boulevard, South Avenue, Bloomfield Avenue, Old Place/Western Avenue, and Newark Liberty International Airport. There would be a dedicated right-of-way in the highway's median between Arthur Kill station and Old Place and Western Avenue, with service in mixed traffic via the Goethals Bridge and the New Jersey Turnpike to AirTrain P1 Parking Lot. Some buses would diverge at South Avenue onto the North Shore BRT to St. George.

The second option would run between Tottenville and Bayonne via Korean War Veterans Parkway and Richmond Avenue. Thirteen stops were proposed: Arthur Kill SIR Station, Foster Road, Huguenot Avenue, Arden Avenue, Annadale Road, Eltingville Transit Center, Staten Island Mall, Travis Avenue, Victory Boulevard, College of Staten Island, Forest Avenue, Elm Park (Walker Street), and 8th Street HBLR Station. The service would run in mixed traffic from Bayonne and across the Bayonne Bridge, and would run in a dedicated right-of-way between Elm Park station and Arthur Kill via Dr. Martin Luther King Jr. Expressway, Richmond Avenue, and the Korean War Veteran Parkway.

In March 2020, the MTA was expected to select its preferred alternative by the end of April, and the project did not have funding for its environmental impact study. However, in Spring 2020, the MTA announced that all planning studies, including the West Shore Alternative Analysis, would be put on hold due to financial issues resulting from the COVID-19 pandemic. In January 2022, after the SIEDC urged the MTA to release the study's results, an MTA spokesperson said public outreach for the study was expected to resume in the following weeks. The two alternatives from the study are being evaluated alongside other potential transit expansion and improvement projects in the city as part of the 2025-2044 Twenty-Year Needs Assessment, which is planned to be completed by October 1, 2023.

=== Kill van Kull transit ===
In September 2007, bus service S89 was introduced between Richmond Avenue in Staten Island and the 34th Street HBLR station. As of April 2011, weekday peak limited stop service from Staten Island terminates at 34th Street with a connection to the Hudson-Bergen Light Rail to Exchange Place.

The Bayonne Bridge was originally built to accommodate two extra lanes that could be used for light rail service. In 2019 the Port Authority of New York and New Jersey completed its project to raise the roadbed of the bridge by 64 feet (20 m), in order to provide the 215-foot (66 m) clearance required by the newer post-Panamax container ships to pass under it. While not having begun any studies, New Jersey Transit was investigating the feasibility of extending HBLR from the 8th Street Station across the raised bridge. It is not clear whether such a system would fall under the supervision of the Metropolitan Transportation Authority, although this is likely. Completing any such extension would involve a collaboration between New Jersey Transit, New York State, and New York City. The development of a Staten Island light rail system which could connect with the HBLR system has gained political support in New York. US Senator Robert Menendez supported the HBLR extension conceptually, but questioned the benefit for New Jersey.

Another proposal for transit over the Kill van Kull is an aerial gondola connecting Bayonne and the North Shore.

== See also ==
- Mass transit in New York City
- History of New York City transportation
- Transportation in New York City
