= Port Ivory station =

Former Staten Island Railway station

Port Ivory

General information
- Location: Port Ivory, Staten Island
- Coordinates: 40°38′12″N 74°10′53″W
- Line: North Shore Branch
- Platforms: 1 island platform
- Tracks: 2

History
- Opened: 1906; 120 years ago
- Closed: 1948; 78 years ago
- Former names: Milliken

Former services
Preceding station	Staten Island Railway	Following station
Terminus	North Shore Branch	Arlington toward St. George
Location

Port Ivory was a station on the abandoned North Shore Branch of the Staten Island Railway, in the Port Ivory region of Staten Island, New York. It was located 6.1 miles (9.8 km) from the Saint George terminal.

== History ==
The station served Procter & Gamble and, until 1914, neighboring industry Milliken Steel (which became Downey's Shipyard) as well. The station opened in 1906, and SIRT provided & scheduled trains to meet shift changes at Procter & Gamble. In 1925, a section of track was electrified from Arlington to Port Ivory. The passenger station closed in 1948. This was the terminal of the North Shore Branch until its closure. The Port Ivory Station platform was behind the Procter & Gamble employee cafeteria. Most trains terminated one station to the south at Arlington, but the SIRT ran some trains farther west through the yard to the Western Avenue grade crossing, then into the Procter & Gamble plant yard. The plant was the B & O's largest customer on the island. There was a main receiving yard at the plant, which was full of covered hoppers. Procter & Gamble was such as busy place that cars were moved and spotted by a company-owned switching locomotive.
