= Livingston, Staten Island =

Neighborhood in New York City

Coordinates: 40°38′33″N 74°06′33″W

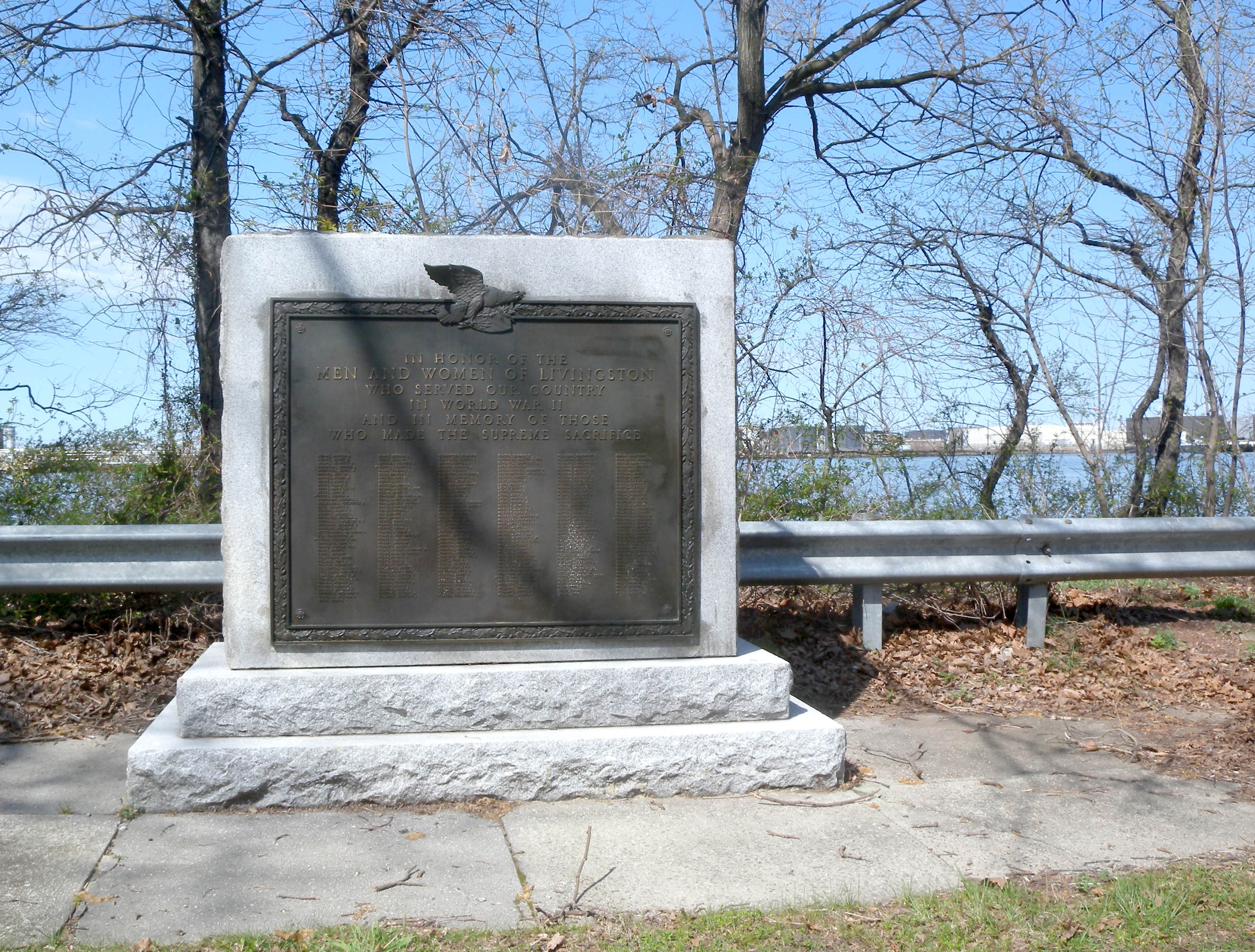
Livingston War Memorial

Livingston is a name sometimes applied to the northeastern portion of West Brighton, a neighborhood located on the North Shore of the New York City borough of Staten Island.

== Geography ==
While official boundaries do not exist for any designated places on Staten Island, Livingston is most commonly regarded as being enclosed by Bement Avenue on the west, the Kill Van Kull shoreline on the north, Henderson Avenue on the south, and the Snug Harbor Cultural Center on the east which is also considered part of the neighborhood. It is dominated by large, older homes built before 1900, and its streets are shaded by spreading oak and elm trees.

== History ==
One of the first Europeans to settle the area was Francis Lovelace, the second governor of the New York colony, who in 1668 started farming in the area that would become Livingston. An earlier name for part of the district was Elliottville, after a renowned ophthalmologist, Samuel Mackenzie Elliott, who by 1840 had acquired more than 30 homes in the community. (Note: Dr. Elliot's granite house from the 1840s still stands at 69 Delafield Place.) The present name of Livingston was coined by officials of the Staten Island Railway who bought the mansion of resident Anson Livingston and then gave that name to a station built near the current intersection of Richmond Terrace and Bard Avenue. This station was situated on the now-defunct North Shore branch of the railway, on which passenger service ceased in 1953; the tracks on this branch are still there, but all traces of the Livingston station have been removed, as is the case with the two other former stations on either side (Sailors' Snug Harbor and West Brighton).

== Transportation ==
Livingston was formerly served by the North Shore Branch of the Staten Island Railway at Livingston, before it was closed. Livingston is now served by two pairs of bus routes: the S40 and S90, as well as the S44 and S94.

== Notability ==
Robert Gould Shaw was a resident of Livingston as were many abolitionists in the 19th century. Several of the 19th century homes, especially those along Davis and Pelton Avenues, were part of the Underground Railroad and have remnants such as hiding places. George William Curtis, who married Shaw's sister Anna, was also a resident.

Livingston was a filming location for movies such as School of Rock and A Beautiful Mind, which was filmed on Kissel Avenue. The neighborhood was also used for the television program The Education of Max Bickford.
