= West Brighton station =

West Brighton station may refer to:

- A former name for Hove railway station, Sussex, England
- A common name for West New Brighton station, a former station in New York City
