= West Brighton (disambiguation) =

West Brighton, or West New Brighton, is a neighborhood in Staten Island, New York City

West Brighton may also refer to:

- West New Brighton station, serving the Staten Island neighborhood
- A former name for Hove railway station, Sussex, England
