= Tower Hill station =

Tower Hill station may refer to:

- Tower Hill station (Staten Island Railway), in New York City, United States
- Tower Hill tube station, in London, England
