= Francis W. Judge =

English-born American soldier (1838–1904)

Francis W. Judge (February 10, 1838 - December 3, 1904) was an English-born American soldier who received the Medal of Honor for his actions in the American Civil War.

== Biography ==
Judge was born in England on February 10, 1838. He moved to America sometime between his birth and the start of the American Civil War. He served as First sergeant in Company K of the 79th New York Volunteer Infantry during the Civil War. Judge eventually reached the rank of Brevet Major in the U.S Volunteers. He earned his medal in action at the Battle of Fort Sanders, Knoxville, Tennessee on November 29, 1863. He received his medal on November 2, 1870. He died in New York, New York on December 3, 1904, and is now buried in The Green-Wood Cemetery, Brooklyn, New York.

== Medal of Honor Citation ==
The color bearer of the 51st Georgia Infantry. (C.S.A.), having planted his flag upon the side of the work, Sgt. Judge leaped from his position of safety, sprang upon the parapet, and in the face of a concentrated fire seized the flag and returned with it in safety to the fort.
