= Battle of Lewinsville =

1861 skirmish of the American Civil War

Coordinates: 38°55.69′N 77°11.46′W

- Part of the American Civil War
Date	September 11, 1861
Location	Lewinsville, Virginia
Result	Inconclusive

Belligerents
United States (Union)	(Confederate States of America) CSA (Confederacy)

Commanders and leaders
Colonel Isaac Stevens; Captain Charles Griffin	Colonel J.E.B. Stuart; Major James Terrill; Captain Thomas Rosser

Strength
1,800	400+

Casualties and losses
2 killed, 3 wounded, 4 captured	Claimed no casualties but had at least 1 killed, 1 wounded.

The Battle of Lewinsville was an engagement fought between a Confederate States Army force of 400 to 500 men and the United States Army units numbering about 1,800 men near Lewinsville, Virginia in Fairfax County, Virginia, on September 11, 1861. The Union reconnaissance in force led to the engagement, part of the operations of Major General General McClellan in the last half of 1861 in northern Virginia. After taking control of the Washington defenses after the First Battle of Bull Run, McClellan strengthened the ring of forts and outposts defending the immediate vicinity of Washington, D.C. He also planned to cautiously extend the area of northern Virginia under Union control. Scouting, surveying and mapping missions were among the early actions implementing this plan. Minor battles occurred, which were notable for their effects on military and political actions and leadership appointments in the nascent war.

In the September 11 action, the Rebel force under the command of Colonel J. E. B. Stuart, with Major James B. Terrill commanding the infantry and Captain Thomas L Rosser commanding the artillery, engaged the Union regiments under the overall command of Colonel Isaac Stevens, with Captain Charles Griffin commanding the artillery, while they were withdrawing from their reconnaissance and surveying mission. The Confederate attack hastened the withdrawal of the U.S. troops and inflicted several casualties. Stuart officially reported that the Confederates sustained no casualties. Union forces included companies of the 19th Regiment Indiana Volunteer Infantry, one of the original regiments of the Iron Brigade of the Army of the Potomac and the 79th New York Infantry Regiment ("Highlanders"). The complete Union order of battle is in the following footnote. The Confederate order of battle is in the following footnote. The steadfast performance of the men of the 79th New York Infantry Regiment resulted in the return of their regimental colors which had been taken from them because of a mutiny over the term of their service and other organizational issues a month earlier.

The action featured Stuart's tactic of using close up artillery along with cavalry, a tactic not initially favored by General Joseph E. Johnston, commanding Confederate forces in northern Virginia and one of his two immediate subordinates, General P. G. T. Beauregard. His other immediate subordinate and Stuart's commanding officer, then Brigadier General James Longstreet, commended Stuart's actions and praised him for his success. Johnston and Beauregard joined Longstreet in generally praising Stuart and recommending his promotion to the grade of brigadier general. Stuart was promoted two weeks later. Although involving larger forces and Stuart's ambitious use of artillery, as well as noteworthy incidents and more apparent later effects on operations and the advancement of commanders, the September 11 action at Lewinsville was similar in the level of combat as in several other small battles, skirmishes, raids and reconnaissances of the two armies in northern Virginia in the fall of 1861. These other battles included other skirmishes near Lewinsville on September 10 and September 25 following another reconnaissance in force.

The September 11 action resulted in favorable reports concerning three Union officers, two of whom became general officers and one of whom, Lieutenant Orlando Poe, became chief engineer for Major General William T. Sherman in 1864. Isaac Stevens was appointed a Union Army brigadier general three days after Stuart's promotion. In addition to Stuart, two other Confederate officers also became general officers. A private, John S. Mosby, later colonel of the 43rd Virginia Cavalry Battalion ("Mosby's Rangers"), came to Stuart's attention at this engagement. Although the Union force suffered some casualties and withdrew from the field and the Confederates officially reported no casualties (although Mosby in a letter to his wife mentions 1 killed, 1 wounded), the engagement may be considered inconclusive or a draw. The Union force achieved its objective of scouting and mapping the area around Lewinsville before withdrawing. The withdrawal was part of the mission plan, which also included the instruction not to bring on a general engagement.

== Background ==
After the Confederate victory at the First Battle of Bull Run on July 21, 1861, Union soldiers retreated into the forts and camps around Washington, D.C. as well as into Washington and Alexandria, Virginia. Within a week, Confederates followed and occupied locations in much of Fairfax County, Virginia, including Fairfax Court House, Falls Church, Bailey's Cross Roads, Ball's Cross Roads, Munson's Hill, Mason's Hill, Upton's Hill and the heights outside Annandale. The forces outside Annandale, only three miles from Alexandria and six miles from Washington, were under the command of Brigadier General James Longstreet.

On July 27, 1861, President Abraham Lincoln appointed Major General George B. McClellan as commander of the Military Division of the Potomac, the main Union force responsible for the defense of Washington. Due to some success in early operations in western Virginia, which in 1863 became West Virginia, McClellan had been promoted to major general in the Regular Army (United States) on May 14, 1861. On August 20, McClellan named the Union force the Army of the Potomac.

After being called to Washington in July and through most of August, McClellan spent his time reorganizing and training the army and planning and supervising the enhancement and construction of fortifications and outposts in northern Virginia for the defense of Washington, D.C. On August 14, when the 79th New York Infantry Regiment, as well as part of the 2nd Maine Infantry Regiment, mutinied over term of service, pay and other organizational issues, McClellan sent an artillery battery, two companies of cavalry and several companies of Regular Army infantry to suppress the mutiny. He removed the regimental flag from the 79th New York until they would prove by good behavior that they deserved it back. During the last week of August, unauthorized but successful Union reconnaissances and minor skirmishes occurred near Munson's Hill. The good performances by Union troops encouraged McClellan to plan and to oversee preparations for the reconnaissance by Brigadier General William F. Smith's brigade, including the 79th New York Infantry Regiment, toward Lewinsville on September 11.

== Battle ==
Commanders - Battle of Lewinsville
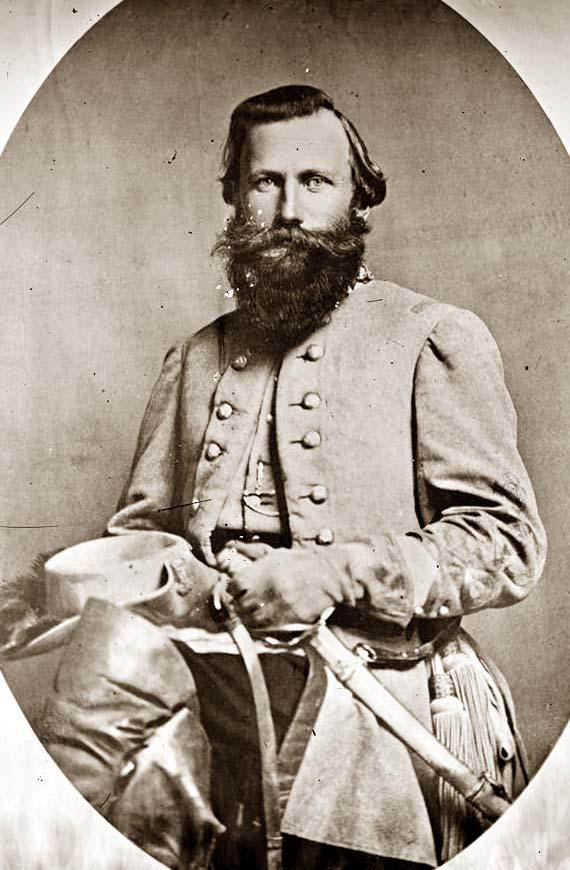
Colonel
J.E.B. Stuart, CSA

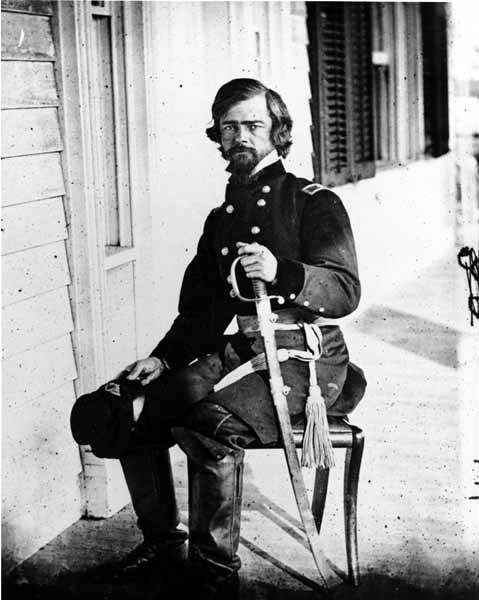
Colonel
Isaac Stevens, USA

On September 11, 1861, a Union reconnaissance in force of about 1,800 soldiers moved at about 7:30 a.m. from their base camp in Virginia just across the Chain Bridge over the Potomac River to Lewinsville, Virginia, about four to five miles distance, arriving about 10:00 a.m. The U.S. force was under the command of Colonel Isaac Stevens, with the artillery under the command of Captain Charles Griffin. The purpose of the mission was to protect the surveying and mapping of the area by Lieutenant Orlando Poe of the U.S. Topographical Engineers and a Mr. West of the U.S. Coast Survey. for a possible Union Army move to a new position farther from the immediate vicinity of Washington D.C. The Union force moved forward cautiously with skirmishers on both flanks out to about a mile from the line of march.

About noon, Confederate Colonel J.E.B. Stuart in charge of outposts near Munson's Hill, seven miles southeast of Lewinsville, was informed by pickets of Union activity in force at Lewinsville that forced the pickets to fall back. Stuart quickly moved with a force of fewer than 500 men to oppose the Union advance. The Confederate force included 305 infantrymen under the command of Major James B. Terrill, a section of artillery led by Captain Thomas L. Rosser, and two cavalry companies of the First Virginia Cavalry Regiment.

Stuart's force came within sight of the Union force at about 3:00 p.m., at which time the Union skirmishers had just been called in and the Union force was preparing to return to their camp. Stuart initially went forward through the woods with three scouts to view the Union force. One of the scouts, Private John S. Mosby, the future "Gray Ghost", saw a "gaily dressed" Union colonel on a splendid horse and took aim at him with a carbine. Stuart stopped Mosby from firing, saying that the colonel might be a Confederate. Mosby wrote that he never regretted so much in his life "the glorious opportunity that I missed of winging their colonel." Stuart sent about 100 men as skirmishers to approach the Union position through woods near the town to screen their advance. The Confederates were soon driven back by return fire from the skirmishers of Lieutenant S.R. Elliot's company of the 79th New York Infantry Regiment, who covered the withdrawal from the surprise rifle fire of Stuart's hidden skirmishers.

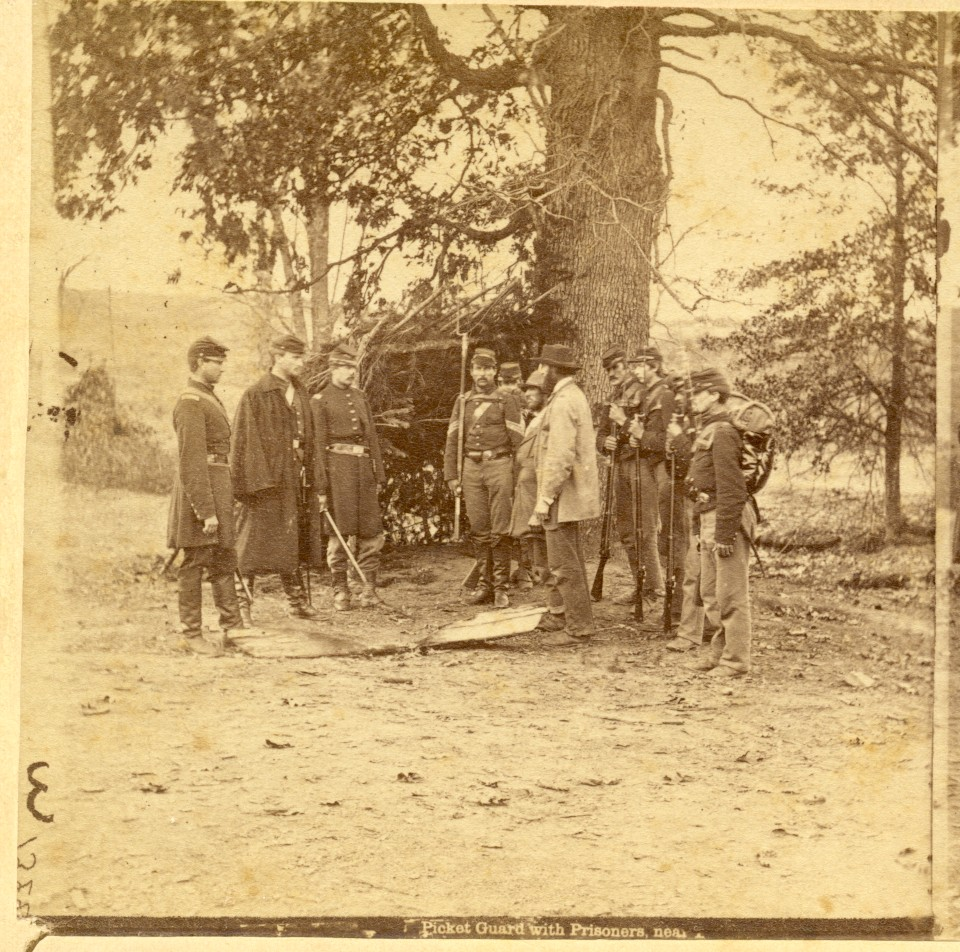
79th New York Infantry Regiment reprising their roles as pickets during reconnaissance of Lewinsville, Virginia on Sept. 11, 1861.

Upon returning to his men, Stuart ordered the Confederate artillery to fire on the Union infantry. Stuart reported that this sent the Union force from a quarter of a mile away to a rallying point a mile and one-half up the road. The Union force was already beginning to withdraw from their advanced position after Orlando Poe had finished mapping the area when the attack began but the Union force responded to the Confederates with artillery fire as they continued to withdraw.

Stuart relied primarily on the artillery in this action, which was mainly a two-hour artillery duel. The Confederate forces stayed in the woods during most of the conflict so as not to openly expose their positions, which they changed occasionally. Some Confederates charged from the woods to a house about 1,000 yards distant and captured an officer and four privates. Stuart was impressed by Rosser's actions in command of the artillery and praised his performance.

Sources differ on the casualties sustained by the Union force. Dyer's Compendium shows the Union loss to be 6 killed, 8 wounded, total, 14. Dyer shows no captured Union soldiers but in his report on the battle, Union Brigadier General W. F. Smith wrote that the 19th Indiana Infantry Regiment had a lieutenant and two enlisted men captured. Stuart reported capturing four Union soldiers. Poland gives the Union casualties as 2 killed, 3 wounded, 4 captured. Stevens states that the Union force had 2 killed, 13 wounded and 3 captured.

Union artillery shells fell near Confederate forces but the Confederates reported no casualties, although Mosby separately wrote to his wife about one killed and one wounded, and Smith reported an informant's report of four Confederate casualties. Most of the artillery shells of both armies, nearly all from distances almost 2,800 yards apart, sailed over the heads of their targets, resulting in the light casualties.

While Colonel Stevens made other dispositions, he placed Lieutenant Poe in charge of the rear guard. After allowing the 19th Indiana Infantry Regiment skirmishers to pass through, Poe set up artillery for use against the Confederate cavalry still in view. The Confederates made no attempt to charge the Union position. When Union Brigadier General W. F. Smith, Stevens's brigade commander, came up to the battlefield at the end of the engagement, he relieved Poe of command of the rear guard.

W. F. Smith came up to the battlefield with a section of Captain Thaddeus P. Mott's battery as the battle was ending. Captain Griffin, commander of the artillery and Captain Mott fired a few more rounds without response. Smith found the Union men retreating in good order, in good spirits and professing to be ready for anything. After seeing that a general engagement had not occurred, Smith congratulated the men on their successful mission. Even McClellan came forward about one-half hour later and after calming down about an engagement possibly having occurred, congratulated Smith, but not Stevens, and visited with the wounded before departing.

After Lieutenant Poe along with Colonel Stevens and Captain Griffin examined the area, Poe reported that "It has great natural advantages, is easily defensible and should be occupied without delay." At least three slightly different versions of a story about Poe leaving a note inviting Stuart, whom he had known from their time at West Point two classes apart, at Willard's hotel in Washington D.C. can be found in the sources.

Both sides bragged about the conduct of their men and claimed victory, but the result has been described as a "nonconclusive exchange of fire." The reaction to Union troops standing their ground under fire has been described as "one of jubilation." McClellan's report to Union General-in-chief Winfield Scott that the men "behaved most admirably under fire" and that "We shall have no more Bull Run affairs". On September 14, McClellan restored the regimental colors of the 79th New York Infantry Regiment, previously withdrawn because of a mutiny on August 14, due to their good conduct during the September 11 engagement.

== Aftermath ==
Confederate Colonel J. E. B. Stuart, later major general and commander of the cavalry in the Army of Northern Virginia, received special praise for his role in the battle and his proficiency and zeal in the discharge of his duties from General Longstreet, Stuart's immediate commanding officer. Longstreet received Stuart's report on the engagement and forwarded it with his own report to General Johnston and General P. G. T. Beauregard. Longstreet recommended that Stuart be promoted to brigadier general. Johnston and Beauregard endorsed the recommendation. Stuart was promoted to brigadier general two weeks later, on September 25, 1861 and given command of a brigade of six regiments of cavalry. At that time the brigade was the entire mounted force of the Confederate Army of the Potomac. Stuart's independent command of the entire cavalry force gave the Confederates an advantage in organization and operations in coming months because of Stuart's flexibility in conducting raids and screening the army's movements. McClellan, on the other hand, distributed the Union cavalry throughout the army under infantry commanders and without any tactical independence.

The other Confederate commanders in the September 11 engagement, James B. Terrill and Thomas L. Rosser also became Confederate generals. Union commander W. F. Smith was already a brigadier general. Of the other Union commanders, Isaac Stevens and Charles Griffin became generals. Stevens was appointed brigadier general on September 28, 1861 to rank from that date.

Orlando Poe became chief engineer for Major General William T. Sherman from December 1863 until the end of the war. Poe had been appointed brigadier general on November 29, 1862 but had not been confirmed when the term of Congress ended on March 4, 1863. Poe was renominated brigadier general on May 4, 1863 to rank from November 1862 but the appointment was not confirmed. On April 10, 1866, President Andrew Johnson nominated Poe for appointment to the grade of brevet brigadier general in the Regular Army of the United States to rank from March 13, 1865 and the United States Senate confirmed the appointment on May 4, 1866.

General Johnston, commanding the Department of the Potomac and the Confederate Army of the Potomac, pulled back the advanced Confederate positions in Fairfax County to Centreville, Virginia beginning in late September 1861. The move was completed by October 19. The disastrous Union defeat at the Battle of Ball's Bluff near Leesburg, Virginia just to the west in Loudoun County, Virginia followed only two days later. This setback made McClellan even more determined to avoid any potentially risky operations without careful planning and preparation. The Army of the Potomac fought no battles in northern Virginia after Ball's Bluff and made no significant move to further dislodge the Confederates from northern Virginia until early March 1862. The Confederates stayed at Centreville, Fairfax Court House and other camps in northern Virginia in the Washington, D.C. vicinity until then. McClellan's time and energy became further spread out when he was named General-in-chief to replace the retiring Lieutenant General Winfield Scott on November 1, 1861, a position which he held until March 12, 1862.

By March 6, 1862, Confederate President Jefferson Davis had written to General Johnston that he was aware that Johnston would need to retreat in the face of an expected advance by McClellan's Army of the Potomac. Union troops began to move slowly toward Manassas on March 7 while Johnston started to pull back from more advanced positions in response. On March 8 and 9, Johnston vacated Centreville, Manassas and positions along the Potomac River and moved to Rappahannock Station by March 11. Union troops found burning material and damaged railroad installations with little of value left at Manassas on the same day. McClellan went to Centreville and Manassas on the evening of March 11. At a cabinet meeting the same night, Lincoln told the cabinet he would remove McClellan as General-in-chief since McClellan was going to take the field as commander of the Army of the Potomac. McClellan learned of the decision the next day and assured Lincoln of his continued devotion to his service. Johnston's forces moved to stronger positions south of the Rappahannock River by March 13. On March 17, Union forces finally began to move by boat toward Fort Monroe for the start of the Peninsula Campaign.
