= Livingston station (Staten Island Railway) =

Former Staten Island Railway station

Livingston
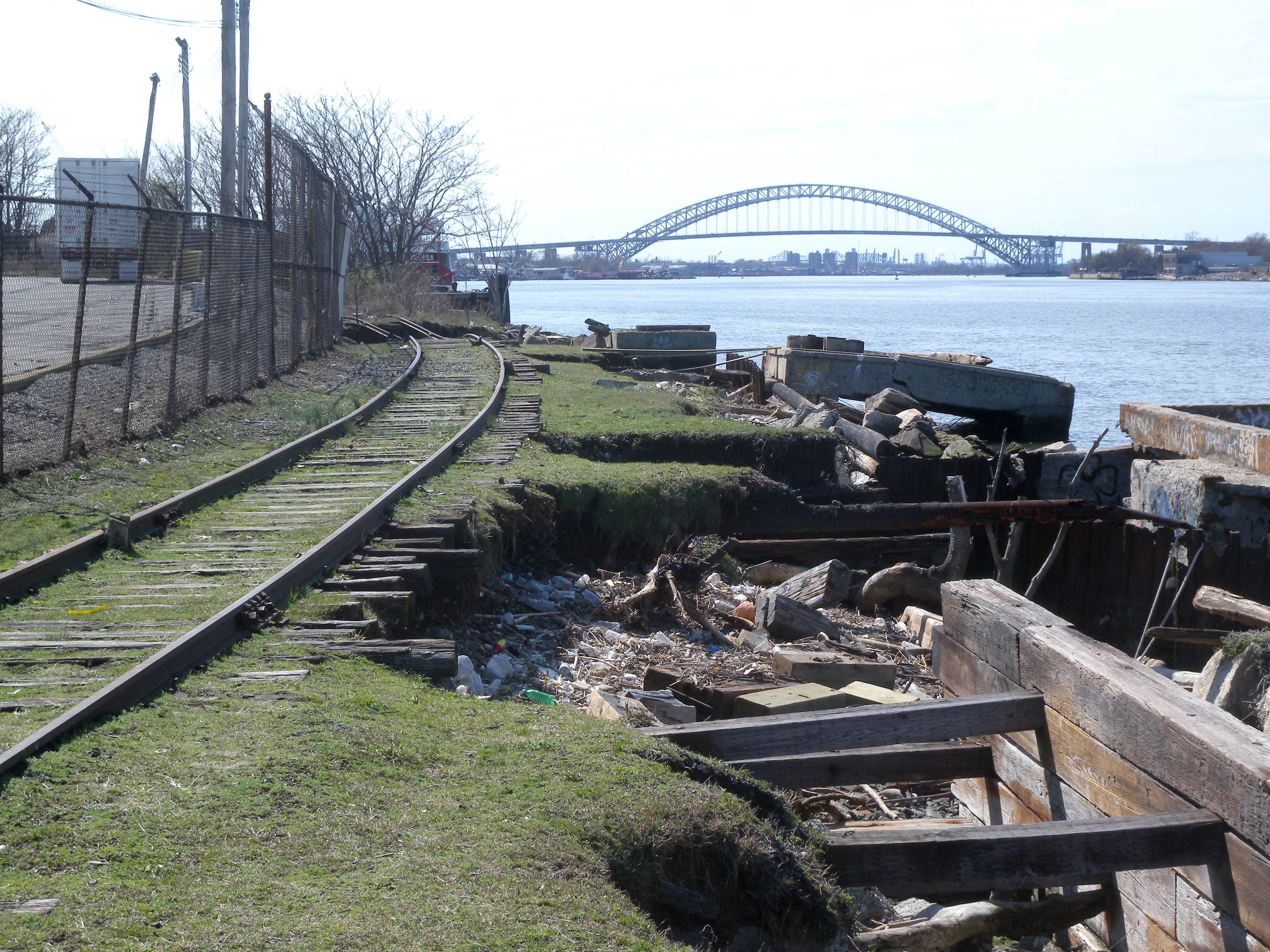
- Western part of station site

General information
- Location: Richmond Terrance and Bard Avenue, Livingston, Staten Island
- Coordinates: 40.64545°N 74.1088°W
- Line: North Shore Branch
- Platforms: 2 side platforms
- Tracks: 2

History
- Opened: February 23, 1886; 140 years ago
- Closed: March 31, 1953; 73 years ago
- Former names: Livingston Street

Former services
Preceding station	Staten Island Railway	Following station
West New Brighton toward Port Ivory	North Shore Branch	Sailors' Snug Harbor toward St. George
Location

The Livingston station is a former station on the abandoned North Shore Branch of the Staten Island Railway. Located north of Richmond Terrace at Bard Avenue in the Livingston section of Staten Island, it had two tracks and two side platforms. The site is 1.8 miles (2.9 km) from the Saint George terminal. Closed in 1953, the station was demolished, with few remnants of the site today.

== History ==
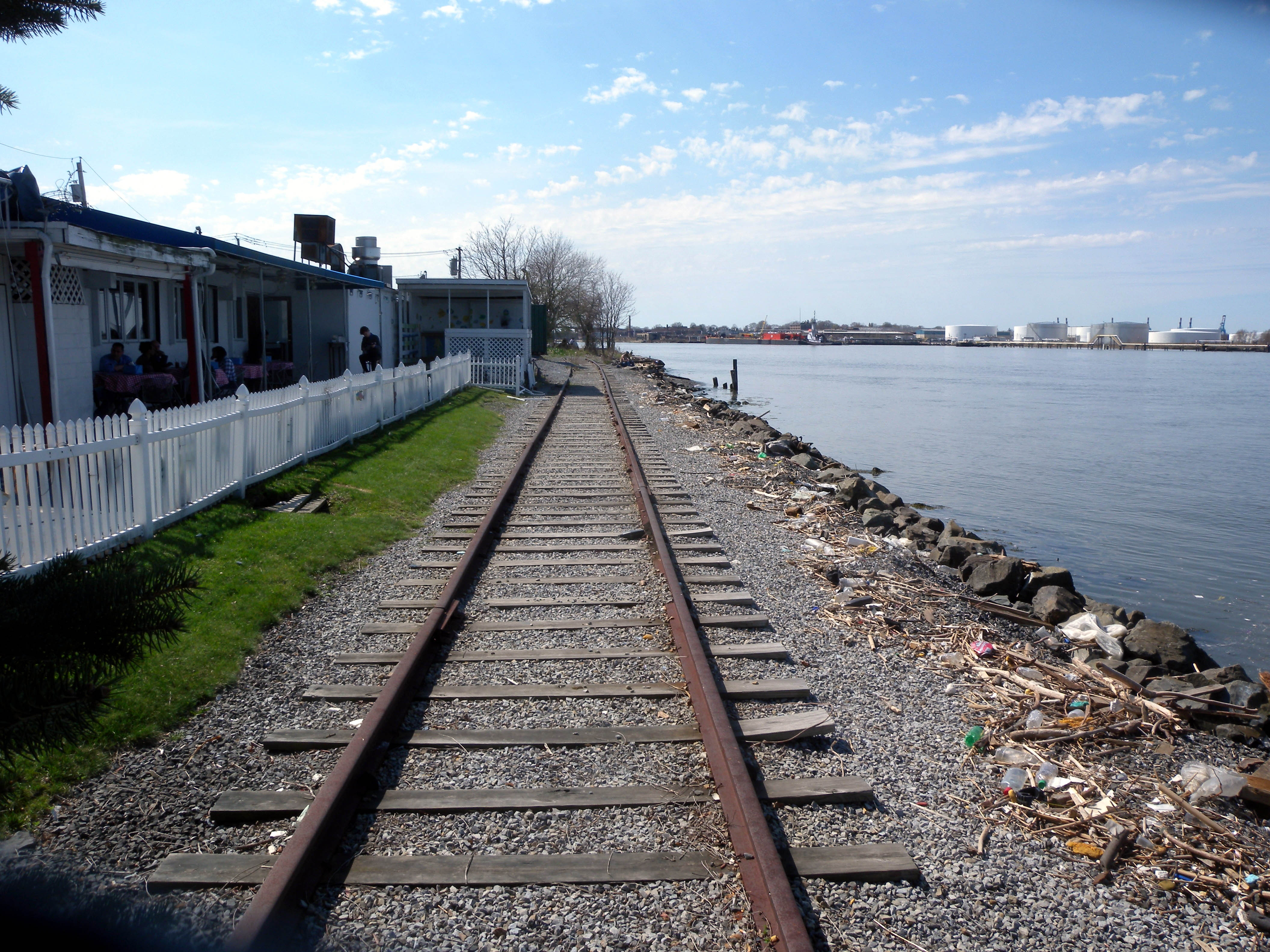
The remaining St. George-bound trackway and the restaurant (left) along the ROW.

The station opened on February 23, 1886 along with the other North Shore stations from St. George west to Elm Park. It sits on land formerly occupied by the mansion of Livingston namesake Anson Livingston, also known as the "Bleak House," which was purchased by the North Shore Railroad in 1886. The town name "Livingston" was coined by SIRT officials. The station was located on a wooden trestle on the shore of the Kill Van Kull on the edge of the island, built with two wooden high-level side platforms. The former mansion was used as the stationhouse, with an overpass between the platforms on the west end of the station. Industrial buildings were located adjacent to the station, including a power plant of the Richmond Light and Railroad Company, which operated a streetcar line along Richmond Terrace parallel to the SIRT until 1934.

The station was abandoned on March 31, 1953, along with the South Beach Branch and the rest of the North Shore Branch. Currently, the station site is occupied by an employee parking lot for the Con Edison facility located across the street. Just east of the site is a restaurant, R.H. Tugs, which sits adjacent to the tracks. The restaurant closed in August 2011 after 25 years of operation, reopening as Blue Restaurant. The northern of the line's two tracks has been taken up, and due to coastal erosion of the line's retaining wall, part of the trestle has slid into the Kill Van Kull along with some of the trackage east and west of here. Livingston is one of the stations to be returned to operation under the proposals for reactivation of the North Shore branch for rapid transit, light rail, or bus rapid transit service. Under the proposal, the right-of-way would be moved from the coastline to the parking lot site.
