= Port Richmond station =

Former Staten Island Railway station

Port Richmond
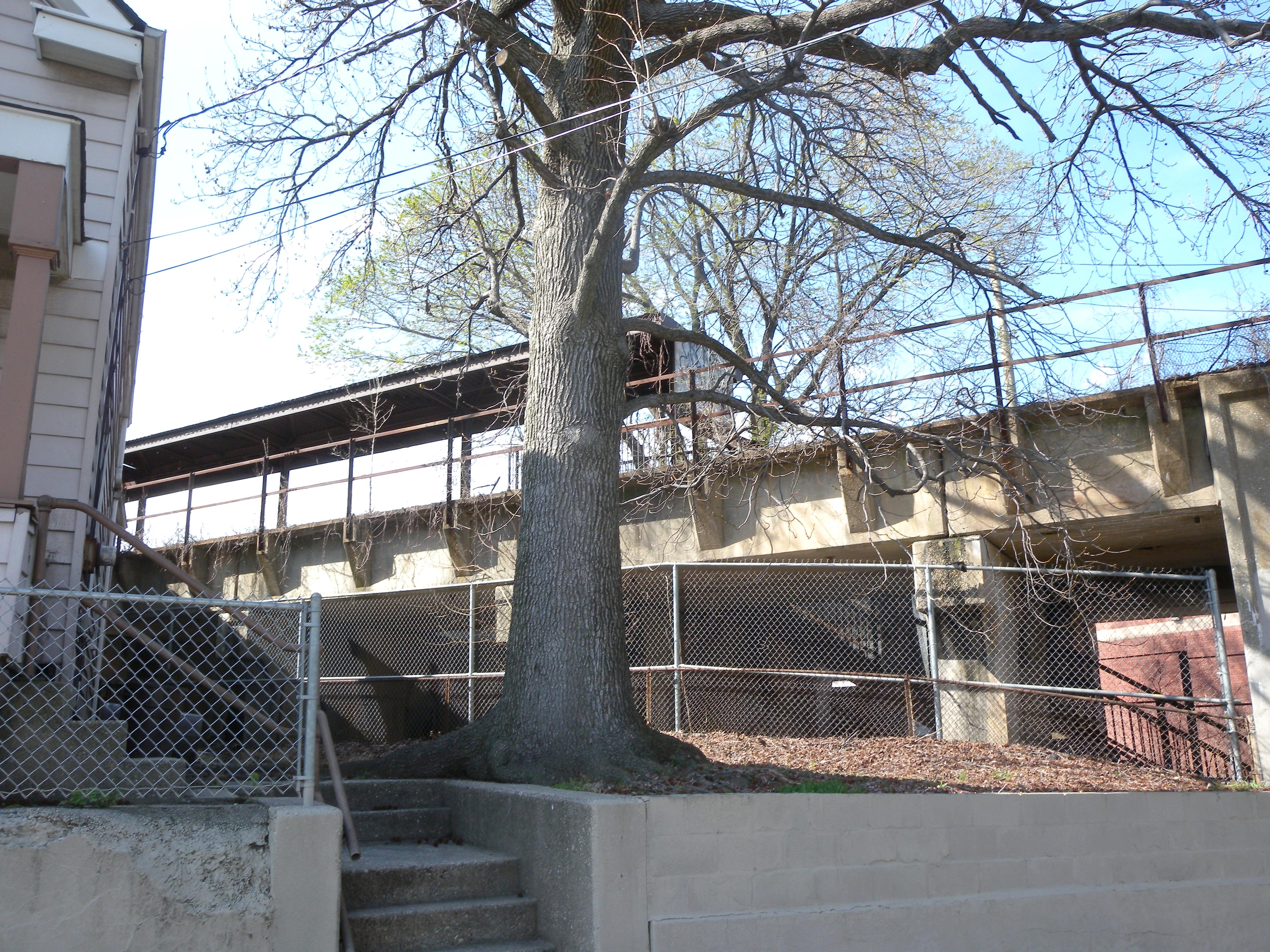
- Park Avenue

General information
- Location: Port Richmond, Staten Island
- Coordinates: 40.6391°N 74.1311°W
- Line: North Shore Branch
- Platforms: 1 island platform
- Tracks: 2

History
- Opened: February 23, 1886; 140 years ago
- Closed: March 31, 1953; 73 years ago

Former services
Preceding station	Staten Island Railway	Following station
Tower Hill toward Port Ivory	North Shore Branch	West New Brighton toward St. George
Location

Port Richmond is a station on the abandoned North Shore Branch of the Staten Island Railway. Located in Port Richmond on a concrete trestle at Park Avenue and Church Street, it has two tracks and an island platform. The station is located approximately 3 miles (4.8 km) from Saint George Terminal.

== History ==
The station was opened by the Baltimore and Ohio Railroad on February 23, 1886, as a wooden surface station, with two high-level side platforms. Between Port Richmond and West Brighton, the line crossed an eight-foot high suspension bridge over Bodine Creek. The low clearance of the bridge attracted some individuals to fish and crab from the trestle, leading to several accidents. Beginning in 1935, the Port Richmond station and Tower Hill one stop west were elevated onto a concrete viaduct structure known as the Port Richmond Viaduct as part of the grade-crossing elimination project of the SIRT. The new trestle was built on top of the old Bodine Creek bridge, raising the crossing to safer heights. At the time, the one-mile viaduct was claimed to be "the longest in the United States." The new station was opened on February 26, 1937. East of the station, the line returns to grade level after crossing the remnants of Bodine Creek, with the trestle ending at the east end of the Port Richmond Water Pollution Control Plant operated by the NYCDEP. The station was closed on March 31, 1953, along with the rest of the North Shore Branch and the South Beach Branch. Port Richmond is one of the few stations along the North Shore line standing today, as of June 2013.

The current elevated station was built with a concrete island platform and a metal canopy extending its entire length. The platform measures about 240 feet (73 m) in length, which would fit three cars of the former ME-1 rolling stock (67 feet in length) or of the current R44 SIR cars (75 feet in length). The station has two staircases to street level on opposite ends of the platform; the westernmost at the intersection of Port Richmond Avenue and Ann Street, and the easternmost at Park Avenue and Church Street. The trestle remains in good condition, but the former platform and canopy have been weathered and dilapidated due to lack of maintenance.

Port Richmond is one of the stations to be returned to operation under the proposals for reactivation of the North Shore branch for rapid transit, light rail, or bus rapid transit (BRT) service. Computer renderings for the proposed BRT modifications of the station were created by the MTA in 2012.

One block north of the station on Richmond Terrace is a bus hub known as the Port Richmond Bus Terminal, where the S53, S57, S59, and S66 buses terminate. The S40 and S90 buses, which parallel the North Shore Branch on Richmond Terrace, also stop here. In spite of its name, the terminal consists of three normal NYCDOT bus stops.

== Station layout ==
P Platform level	Westbound	Trackbed
P Platform level	Island platform, not in use
P Platform level	Eastbound	Trackbed
G	Street level	Exit/Entrance
