= Samuel Mackenzie Elliott =

American abolitionist (1811–1875)

Samuel Mackenzie Elliott (1811–1875) was a Scottish-American medical doctor, pioneer of American ophthalmology, abolitionist leader, and a Union soldier who served as lieutenant colonel of the 79th New York Volunteer Infantry.

== Early career ==
Born in Inverness (Scotland) 9 April 1811, Elliott was the son a British Army officer. He graduated from the Glasgow Royal College of Surgeons in 1828 as a physician, practicing in London, and perusing scientific study of the physics and biology of light and sight. In 1833 he traveled to the United States as surgeon on a British ship but remained in the country. Studying with physicians and lecturing in Cincinnati and Philadelphia, he eventually settled in New York City, practicing as what he called an Oculist, as his medical degree was not recognized in the United States until he graduated from the New York Medical College in 1851. At the time he was known as "the nation's premier eye-specialist", and one of the first American ophthalmologists.

== Elliotville treatment community ==
Following considerable success in treatment of previously unknown procedures at his Manhattan clinic, Elliott moved to the north shore of Staten Island, then mostly farmland, but home to a number of summer homes and resorts of well to do New Yorkers. Elliott settled in what is now West New Brighton, and began building a series of gothic revival cottages nearby, here in what is today Livingston, which then became known as Elliottville. His patients, traveling from across the nation and abroad, included Francis Parkman, Henry Wadsworth Longfellow, Charles Dana, George Ribley, John James Audubon, William H. Prescott, Edward L Youmans, and others. One of the 22 cottages, now called the Dr. Samuel MacKenzie Elliott House (1840), remains today and is on the National Register of Historic Places. In these residences Elliott provided housing for his prominent patients while they received treatment, and gathered around him a circle of intellectuals, writers, and abolitionist activists.

Elliott was an ardent abolitionist, and described as a leader in the New York abolitionist movement. Elliotville attracted a social circle which included writers and abolitionists like Sidney Howard Gay, Ralph Waldo Emerson, Lydia Maria Child, and James Russell Lowell. Francis G. Shaw. Abolitionist and father of Civil War commander Robert Gould Shaw—became close friends with Elliott after moving to the neighborhood in 1847 for the treatment of his wife [Sarah Shaw's illnesses. president of the National Freeman's Bureau Later accounts claim that both Elliot's own home and a number of his cottages were used to house runaway slaves traveling the Underground Railroad. His home's basement fireplace and apartment were alleged to be for this purpose.

== Civil War commander ==
Elliott was also famous in the late 19th century as organizer and commander of a Civil War volunteer unit, the 79th Regiment New York Volunteer Infantry. Known as the Highland Brigade, the unit was funded by prominent Scottish New Yorkers, and fielded kilted infantrymen, many of whom were immigrant veterans of the British Army. In his writing, Elliott purposely tied his unit to the British 79th Highlanders, a unit that had distinguished itself in the then recent Crimea War, and with which he claimed some of the New York Volunteers had fought. As lieutenant colonel, Elliott led them at first, but quickly handed over command to Colonel James Cameron, in part due to illness. He had recovered enough to fight at the Battle of Bull Run, where his horse was killed, falling on him and so injuring him that he never recovered full use of his legs. He resigned his commission due to these injuries in August 1861. For his service, on 13 March 1865 Elliott was awarded the honorary rank of brigadier-general by President Abraham Lincoln.

== Later life ==
After the Civil War, Elliot's interests provided support or popularized many intellectual fields. He was a founder of the Popular Science Monthly magazine, promoted and championed the writings of Herbert Spencer, and built a large, domed astronomical observatory in his hill top home. He died in 1875.
