= Dr. Samuel MacKenzie Elliott House =

Historic house in Staten Island, New York

- U.S. National Register of Historic Places
- New York City Landmark
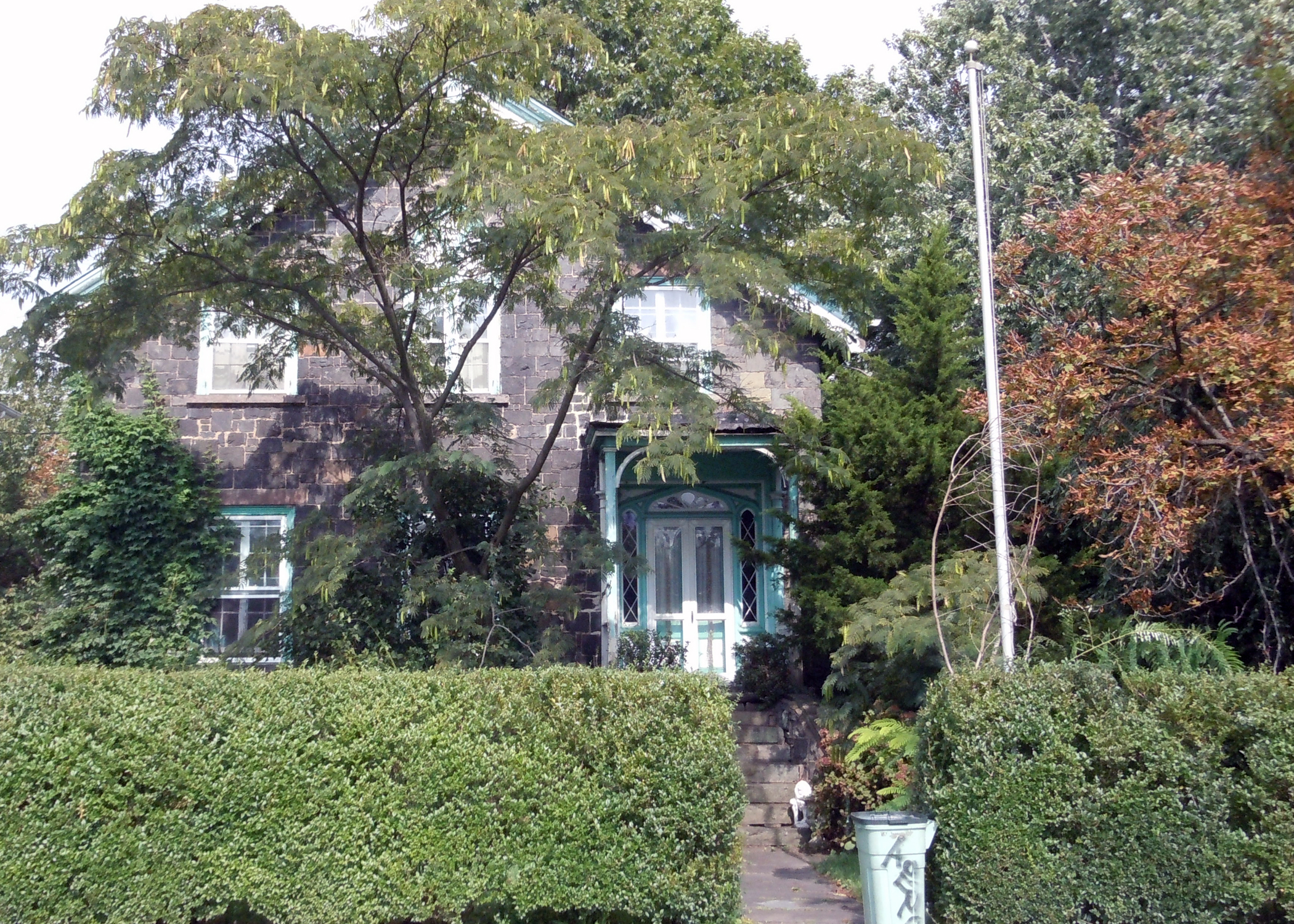
- The house in September 2012

- Location within New York City Location within New York Location within the United States
- Location: 69 Delafield Pl., Staten Island, New York
- Coordinates: 40°38′38″N 74°6′37″W
- Area: less than one acre
- Architect: Dr. Samuel, MacKenzie Elliott
- Architectural style: Gothic Cottage
- NRHP reference No.: 80002757
- NYCL No.: 0338

Significant dates
- Added to NRHP: March 28, 1980
- Designated NYCL: April 12, 1967

The Dr. Samuel MacKenzie Elliott House is a historic house located at 69 Delafield Place in West New Brighton, Staten Island, New York.

== Description and history ==
Built in 1840, it was one of 22 similar houses in the area designed and built as investments by Scottish born Samuel Mackenzie Elliott, an oculist and eye surgeon who boasted prominent clients like John Jacob Astor, Peter Cooper, Henry Wadsworth Longfellow, and Horace Greeley. So great was his influence on the first settlement of this part of the north shore of Staten Island that the neighborhood was then known as "Elliotville". It is a 2 1/2-story, dark grey, locally quarried stone cottage in the Gothic style cottage. It has a gable roof with a small, pointed arch window under the rear gable.

Elliot was an active abolitionist, and this house, along with his own, was reputedly outfitted as a refuge for slaves escaping the United States via the Underground Railroad.

It was designated a New York City Landmark in 1967, and it was added to the National Register of Historic Places on March 28, 1980.

== See also ==
- List of New York City Designated Landmarks in Staten Island
- National Register of Historic Places listings in Richmond County, New York
