= Elliottville, Staten Island =

Neighborhood in New York City

Elliottville
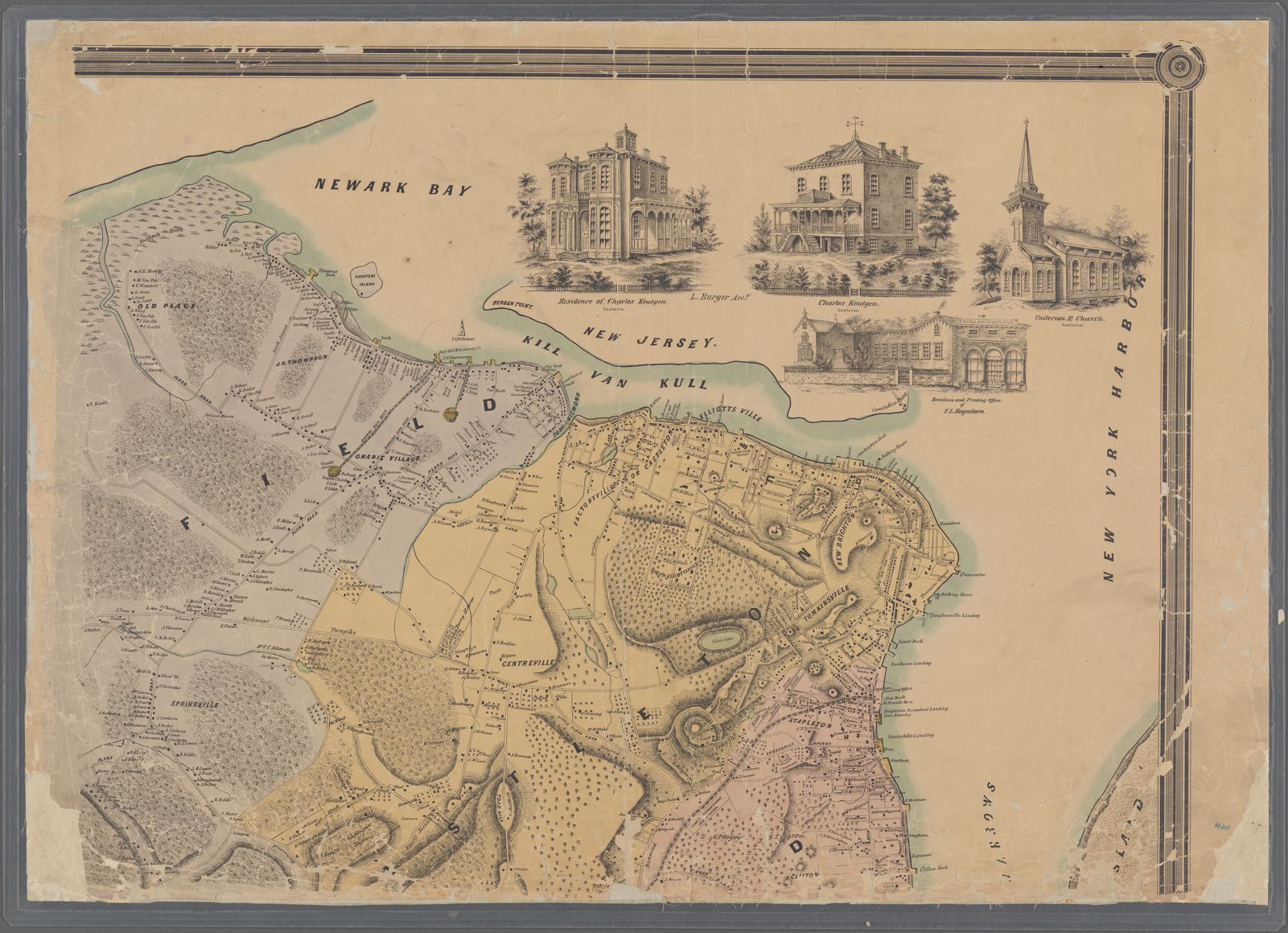
- Map of Staten Island from 1853. Includes Elliottville and surrounding neighborhoods.
- Location: Staten Island, New York
- Coordinates: 40°38′34″N 74°6′30″W
- Settled: 1839

Elliottville was a former neighborhood in Staten Island, within what is now New York City, from the 1850s to the mid-1870s. The area has since become part of the neighborhood of Livingston, which is located within West New Brighton, in the confines of Castleton, Staten Island. The neighborhood of Elliottville remained a distinctive community from approximately 1840 to about 1890. Notable residents include Dr. Samuel Mackenzie Elliot, Francis George Shaw, and John Bard.

== History ==
Elliottville was quite small, spanning around only twelve blocks on either side of a street that was later called Bard Avenue. The original owner of most of the land was a Scottish immigrant and eye surgeon named Dr. Samuel Mackenzie Elliott. On this land he built tens of houses, most of them designed by William Ranlett. From this he preferred the name Elliottville for the enclave and the designation thus appears on a map from 1854. Some early residents had rejected the name, including resident John Bard, the son of William Bard, from whom Elliott had purchased land. Bard's name became attached to the main avenue. Over time, the neighborhood became known as the Bard Avenue section of West New Brighton and later as the Bard Avenue neighborhood of Livingston. Most of these changes were because of developments within the neighborhood, such as a post office in West Brighton and a streetcar depot in the former Anson Livingston mansion.

Residents, along with others on Staten Island, in Manhattan, and elsewhere considered Elliottville as an enclave distinct from the rest of Staten Island. Initially, Elliottville was largely populated by Dr. Elliott's patients, who would travel from other cities to receive treatment due to his national reputation. He would then rent out accommodations to them. Several former patients and their families relocated to Elliottville because of its scenic beauty, and they were convinced of the healthfulness of the location. There was also a ferry to Manhattan at the foot of Bard Avenue, convenient to residents. In addition to New England origins, residents shared a commitment to the abolition of slavery. One prominent abolitionist who lived in the neighborhood, Sydney Howard Gay, was the editor of the National Anti-Slavery Standard. Through his Manhattan office, with the aid of Louis Napoleon, a free black man, he helped hundreds of fugitives from slavery escape to freedom.

Many locals were transcendentalists devoted to social change, including wide-sweeping economic and political changes, as well as those rooted in philosophical and spiritual views. Observing beauty was important to American transcendentalism as was participating in moral action. Elliottville offered this natural beauty and an opportunity to live in harmony with it and with one's neighbors that an urban landscape couldn't. Many of these residents were connected to Brook Farm and were friends and admirers of Ralph Waldo Emerson.

After the Civil War, the neighborhood was still considered an enclave, but the qualities the residents shared were more fluid. There was more social distinction based on achievement or wealth rather than shared origins or a devotion to social reform (although these reformers and New Englanders still made up the majority of residents). There was a general agreement that the residents were distinctive, and the neighborhood stood apart from the rest of Staten Island during the 1840s to the 1890s. However, references to the neighborhood in the local and national press changed over time. They went from an enclave of abolitionists to "the intellectual part of Staten Island," to "the Fifth Avenue" of Staten Island during this time.

From 1840 to 1880, Elliottville was known for its rural beauty and easy access to a scenic coast where people swam and boated. Starting in the 1880s, heavy industry and the North Shore Branch of the B&O Railroad separated the community from the waterfront, and the water became polluted. By this time, New Jersey oil refineries across the Kill van Kull were destroying the air quality. The decline in quality of life in Elliottville was rapid and the community changed drastically. The estate properties were torn down, the land subdivided, and the environment became more consistent with other early-twentieth century suburban developments across Staten Island.

== Notable residents ==
- George William Curtis (1824–1892) – A well-known novelist, essayist, and public speaker before marrying Anna Shaw (1836–1923) in 1855 and moving to Staten Island. Curtis was a founder of the Republican Party, had a long career in Republican politics, and wrote an influential columnist for Harper's Magazine. He lived all his married life on Bard Avenue, and the neighborhood was closely identified with him.
- Sydney Howard Gay (1814–1888) – An abolitionist, he edited the National Anti-Slavery Standard for fourteen years. With the help of Louis Napoleon aided hundreds of fugitives from slavery passing through New York to freedom, and during the Civil War was the influential managing editor of the New-York Tribune. He settled with his wife Elizabeth (Neall) Gay in one of Dr. Elliott's houses in 1847 and lived on the property, almost continuously, until his death.
- Anna Leonowens (1831–1915) – Opened a school attended by Elliottville children in 1868 [mostly taught by her daughter Avis Anna (Leonowens) Fyshe (1854–1902)] and became a life-long friend of many people in the neighborhood. Leonowens wrote the books on Siam for which she is known today in Elliottville, where she had her primary residence until 1874. Her friends George Curtis and Frank Shaw were crucial in establishing her as a writer and lecturer.
- Josephine (Shaw) Lowell (1843–1905) – was a Progressive Reform leader after the Civil War active in many social justice causes and is best known as the founder of the New York Consumers' League in 1890.
- Maria "Middy" Morgan (1828–1892) – Nationally known as one of the first female journalists, she was respected for her knowledge of livestock and, particularly horses. For years, the detailed descriptions of the house she built on Bard Avenue attracted new interest in the neighborhood.
- Francis "Frank" George Shaw (1809–1882) – Frank moved his family to Elliottville while his wife, Sarah Blake (Sturgis) Shaw (1815–1902) was being treated by Dr. Elliott. The Shaw house, between George Curtis's and Sydney Gay's was a focus of neighborhood social life. The Shaws were abolitionists and Frank helped fund Brook Farm, a social experiment to which many Elliottville residents were connected. Shaw held positions in national organizations focused on freedman's education during and after the Civil War.
- Robert Gould Shaw (1837–1863) – Died heroically in the Civil War while leading the first all-Black regiment formed in the Northeast.
- Mary Otis Gay Willcox (1861–1933) – The youngest daughter of Sydney and Elizabeth Gay, she married William Goodenow Willcox (1859–1923) and the two of them lived on the Gay family property until they died. Willcox was a long-time board member of the Tuskegee Institute and Mary was a leader in the New York suffragist movement and, later in the League of Women's Voters.
- Theodore Woolsey Winthrop (1828–1861) – During the 1850s, he lived in the Elliottville household of his sister, Laura (Winthrop) Johnson and wrote novels. After his heroic battlefield death at Big Bethel, the first pitched land battle of the Civil War, he quickly became the Union's first martyr. While living on Staten Island, he became friends with neighbors Robert Gould Shaw and George William Curtis. Curtis wrote a biographical essay for the first of his posthumously published novels.
