= Lewinsville, Virginia =

Unincorporated community in Virginia, United States

- Unincorporated community
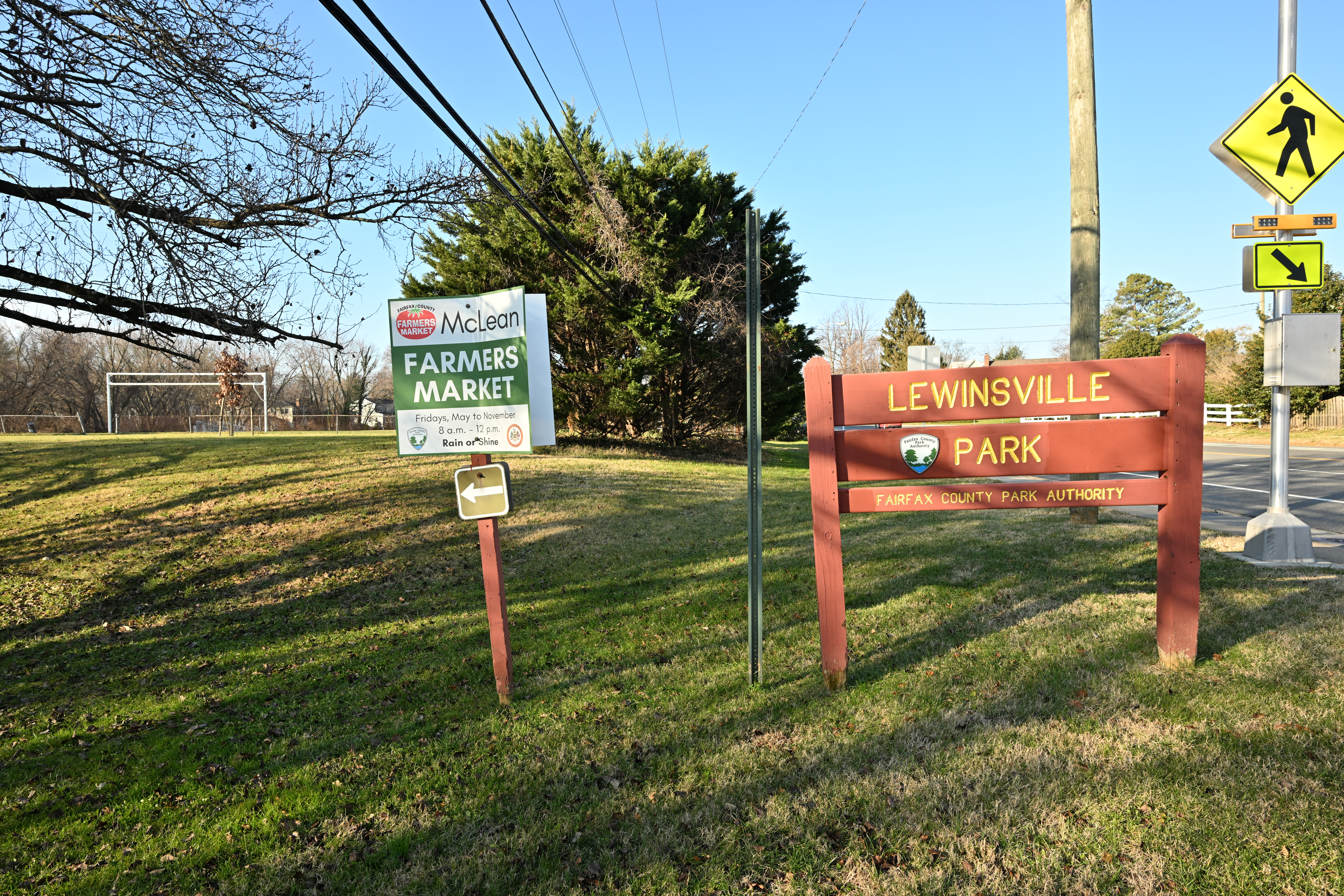
- A sign for Lewinsville Park

- Location within Northern Virginia Location within Virginia Location within the United States
- Coordinates: 38°55′44″N 77°11′52″W
- Country: United States
- State: Virginia
- County: Fairfax
- Time zone: UTC−5 (Eastern (EST))
  - Summer (DST): UTC−4 (EDT)
- GNIS feature ID: 1495834

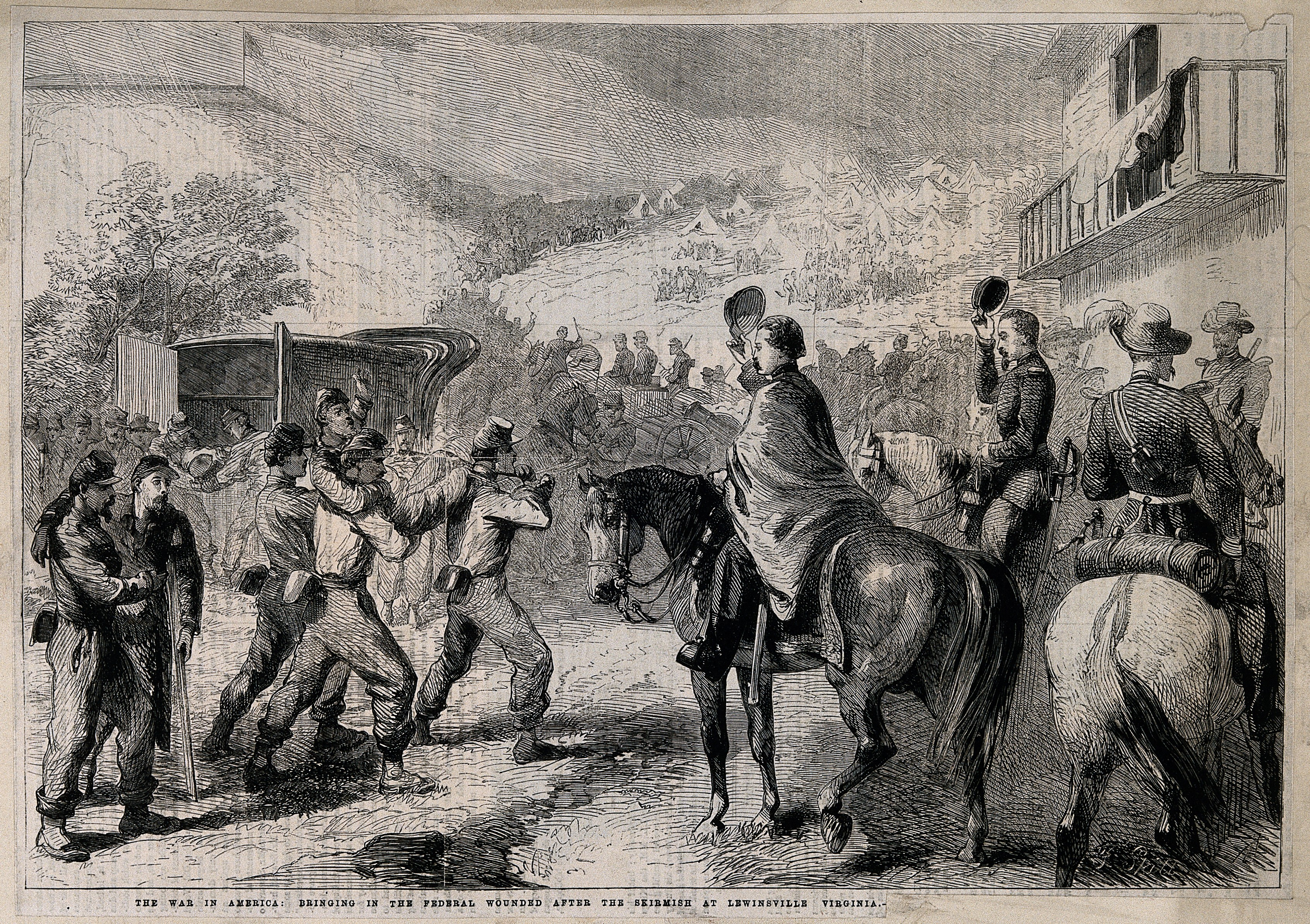
Wounded being brought from the Battle of Lewinsville.

Lewinsville is an unincorporated community in Fairfax County, Virginia, United States. Traditionally, the center of Lewinsville has been located at the crossroads of Lewinsville and Chain Bridge Roads. Together with Langley, Lewinsville forms the census-designated place of McLean.

The Battle of Lewinsville took place in the region during the American Civil War, between the Union Army and the Confederate Army. Casualties for the Union were three dead and some wounded, while casualties for the Confederates were none.
