= West New Brighton station =

Former Staten Island Railway station

West New Brighton
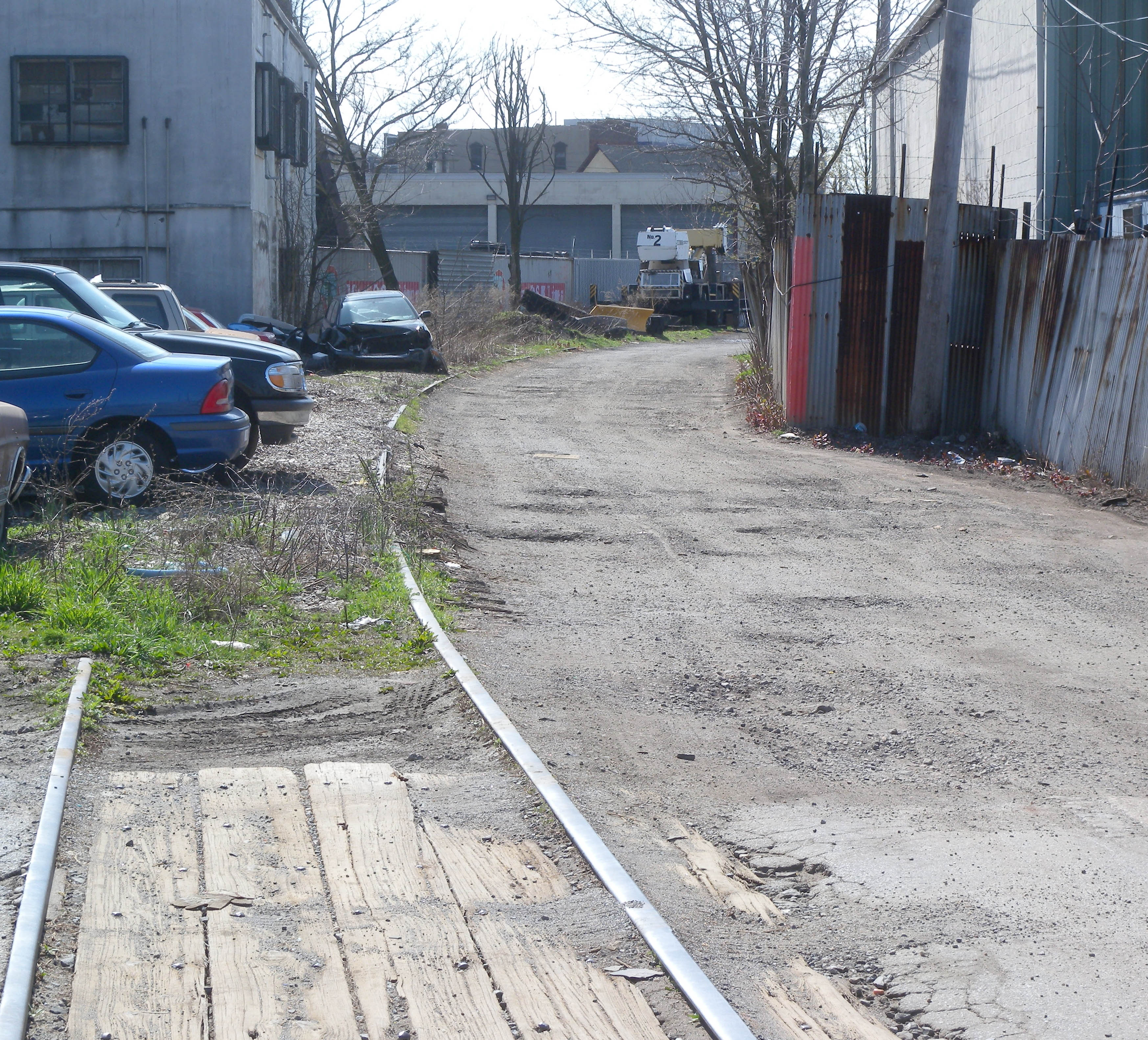
- Near the former station

General information
- Location: West New Brighton, Staten Island
- Coordinates: 40.6415°N 74.1173°W
- Line: North Shore Branch
- Platforms: 2 side platforms
- Tracks: 2

History
- Opened: February 23, 1886; 140 years ago
- Closed: March 31, 1953; 73 years ago
- Former names: West Brighton − Broadway

Former services
Preceding station	Staten Island Railway	Following station
Port Richmond toward Port Ivory	North Shore Branch	Livingston toward St. George
Location

West New Brighton, also referred to as West Brighton, is a station on the abandoned North Shore Branch of the Staten Island Railway. It had two side platforms and two tracks. It was located at-grade in the West New Brighton section of Staten Island, north of Richmond Terrace between North Burgher Avenue and Broadway. The station site is 2.4 miles (3.9 km) from the Saint George terminus. No trace of the station exists today.

== History ==
The station opened on February 23, 1886. Constructed of wood, it had two high-level side platforms designed with Victorian features. A stationhouse and overpass were located in the center of the station, with the stationhouse sitting on the southern (eastbound) platform. West of the station, the line crossed an eight-foot high suspension bridge over Bodine Creek towards Port Richmond. The low clearance of the bridge attracted some individuals to fish and crab from the trestle, leading to several accidents. The low bridge was replaced with a concrete trestle between 1935 and 1937, ending just west of West Brighton station. The station closed on March 31, 1953, along with the rest of the North Shore branch as well as the South Beach branch.

West New Brighton is one of the stations to be returned to operation under the proposals for reactivation of the North Shore branch for rapid transit, light rail, or bus rapid transit service. Though New York City owns the right-of-way of the line at the former station site, its location on developed property has made it difficult to restore service on the North Shore Branch line. The Arlington bound tracks of the right-of-way have been removed entirely and the Saint George bound tracks were left in place after freight operations ceased in the late 80's and were filled in with wood planks by the property owner and paved over for truck use at the dockyard location, although they have started to become visible through wear and tear of the paved roadway along the site Kill Van Kull.
