= Lily Pond Avenue =

Avenue in Staten Island, New York

Coordinates: 40°35′57.04″N 74°3′49.89″W

- Owner: City of New York
- Maintained by: NYCDOT
- Length: 0.71 mi (1.14 km)
- Location: Staten Island, New York
- South end: Father Capodanno Boulevard in Arrochar
- Major junctions: I-278 in Concord
- North end: Tompkins Avenue in Shore Acres

Lily Pond Avenue is a relatively short primary artery in the South Beach, Arrochar, Concord, and Shore Acres neighborhoods in the New York City borough of Staten Island.

== Route description ==
Lily Pond Avenue is the middle leg of Staten Island's coastal eastern corridor, possessing the same route as School Road and Father Capodanno Boulevard. Important intersections include Tompkins Avenue, Narrows Road, Major Avenue, and McClean Avenue. Lily Pond Avenue passes underneath the Staten Island Expressway at the foot of the Verrazzano–Narrows Bridge. Landmarks include the Verrazzano–Narrows Bridge Memorial.

== Points of interest ==
A busy thoroughfare, Lily Pond Avenue has been the scene of at least one fatal motorcycle accident in 2012, and a roadside memorial was set up on the side of that road.

A small, 35-bed nursing home is located on Lily Pond Avenue.

== Transportation ==
Because of the easy access the artery provides to the Verrazzano–Narrows Bridge amongst other destinations, MTA Regional Bus Operations runs the following public bus routes along the avenue:

- All S51 buses serving School Road run along Lily Pond Avenue's entire route. Fort Wadsworth service runs south of Battery Road, along with the S81.
- The S53 runs from the Staten Island Expressway to McClean Avenue.
- The SIM5, SIM6 and SIM9 run from the Staten Island Expressway to Father Capodanno Boulevard.

The New York City Marathon directs buses and private vehicles to Lily Pond Avenue, which is just outside the main staging area for the start of the famous foot race. The street is then closed to through traffic.

The City of New York has a designated bicycle lane on Lily Pond Avenue.

== Major intersections ==
The entire route is in the New York City borough of Staten Island.

Location	mi	km	Destinations	Notes
Arrochar	0.00	0.00	Father Capodanno Boulevard south	
Concord	0.38	0.61	I-278 east (Verrazano Bridge)	Separate ramps to upper and lower levels of the bridge
Shore Acres	0.51	0.82	I-278 west (Staten Island Expressway) – Goethals Bridge	Exit 15 on I-278
Shore Acres	0.71	1.14	Tompkins Avenue / School Road	
1.000 mi = 1.609 km; 1.000 km = 0.621 mi: Electronic toll collection

== In popular culture ==
Lily Pond Avenue is mentioned in several police procedural novels: in F. P. Lione's The Crossroads, the second volume of the Midtown Blues series, Lione's Skells: A Novel, the third volume of the Midtown Blues series, and Jamise L. Dames's Pushing Up Daisies: A Novel,
