= South Beach–Franklin Delano Roosevelt Boardwalk =

Boardwalk in Staten Island, New York

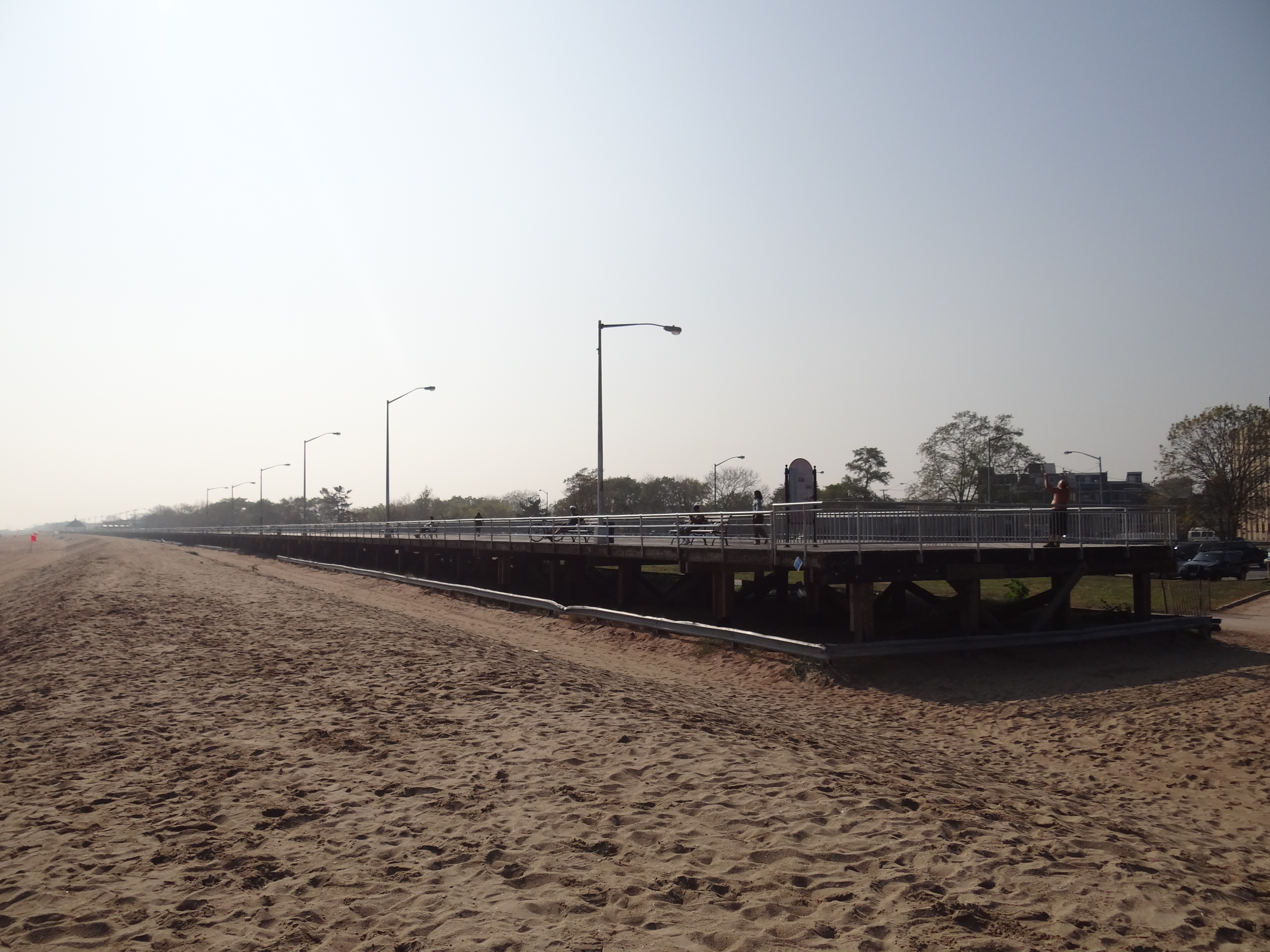
- The northern end of the boardwalk at Fort Wadsworth
- Interactive map of South Beach–Franklin Delano Roosevelt Boardwalk
- Location: Staten Island, New York
- Nearest city: New York City
- Coordinates: 40°34′47″N 74°04′33″W
- Area: 2.5 miles (4.0 km) long by 40 feet (12 m) wide
- Created: 1937
- Operator: New York City Department of Parks and Recreation
- Visitors: 334,000 (2017)
- Open: 6 a.m. to 1 a.m.
- Status: open

The South Beach–Franklin Delano Roosevelt Boardwalk, alternately referred to as the FDR Boardwalk or the South Beach Boardwalk, is a boardwalk facing the Lower New York Bay on the East Shore of Staten Island, one of the five boroughs of New York City. The boardwalk is the main feature of a public park that stretches from Fort Wadsworth and the Verrazzano–Narrows Bridge to Miller Field, both part of the Gateway National Recreation Area. The park also contains numerous recreational facilities, including a skate park.

Originally, the Staten Island shorefront was occupied by multiple amusement parks, which had closed by the 1930s. Construction on the boardwalk started in 1935 and was complete by 1937. Amusements continued to occupy the boardwalk until the late 1950s, when water pollution and other changes started to repel potential visitors. The boardwalk was restored under a multi-million dollar project in the late 1990s. However, it is still relatively lightly used: in 2017, South Beach and Boardwalk saw 334,000 visitors, about 5% of the visitor count at Coney Island.

== Description ==
The South Beach–Franklin Delano Roosevelt Boardwalk stretches 2.5 miles (4.0 km) between Fort Wadsworth to the north and Miller Field to the south. According to the second edition of The Encyclopedia of New York City, published in 2010, the South Beach Boardwalk is the fourth-longest boardwalk in the world. From north to south, it runs through the neighborhoods of Arrochar, South Beach, and Midland Beach. When built it was 40 feet (12 m) wide for its length, half that of the 80-foot-wide (24 m) Riegelmann Boardwalk at Coney Island, located across the Lower New York Bay in Brooklyn. The FDR Boardwalk was made with concrete and timber and contains several pavilions, restrooms, and "comfort stations" along its length. A 200-foot-wide (61 m) boulevard, now known as Father Capodanno Boulevard, was built on the landward side of the boardwalk. A "protected" bicycle lane, segregated from other traffic, stretches the length of the boardwalk.

The South Beach–Franklin Delano Roosevelt Boardwalk is very lightly used compared to other beaches in New York City. In 2017, South Beach and Boardwalk saw 334,000 visitors, compared to 2 million at Orchard Beach in the Bronx, 5 million at Rockaway Beach in Queens, and 6.7 million at Coney Island.

=== Recreational areas ===
The South Beach–Franklin Delano Roosevelt Boardwalk is composed of two main beaches: South Beach to the north of Sea View Avenue and Midland Beach to the south. The beaches contain facilities for baseball, handball, shuffleboard, bocce, checkers, volleyball, and roller hockey, as well as the Ben Soto Skate Park and the Ocean Breeze Fishing Pier.

The boardwalk contains eight baseball fields along its length: five adjacent to Midland Beach and three adjacent to South Beach. Two of the baseball fields in Midland Beach are also shared with a rugby pitch. There is also a basketball court near the south end of the boardwalk, at Greeley Avenue. The Detective Russel Timoshenko Soccer Field, named after a police officer killed in 2007, is located further north on the beach at Slater Boulevard. The northern end contains three bocce boards near Drury Avenue and two volleyball courts near Doty Avenue. Three children's playgrounds exist along the route of the boardwalk. From north to south, they are Playland at Sand Lane; Midland Playground at Graham Avenue; and Midland Beach Playground at Greeley Avenue.

=== Statues and monuments ===
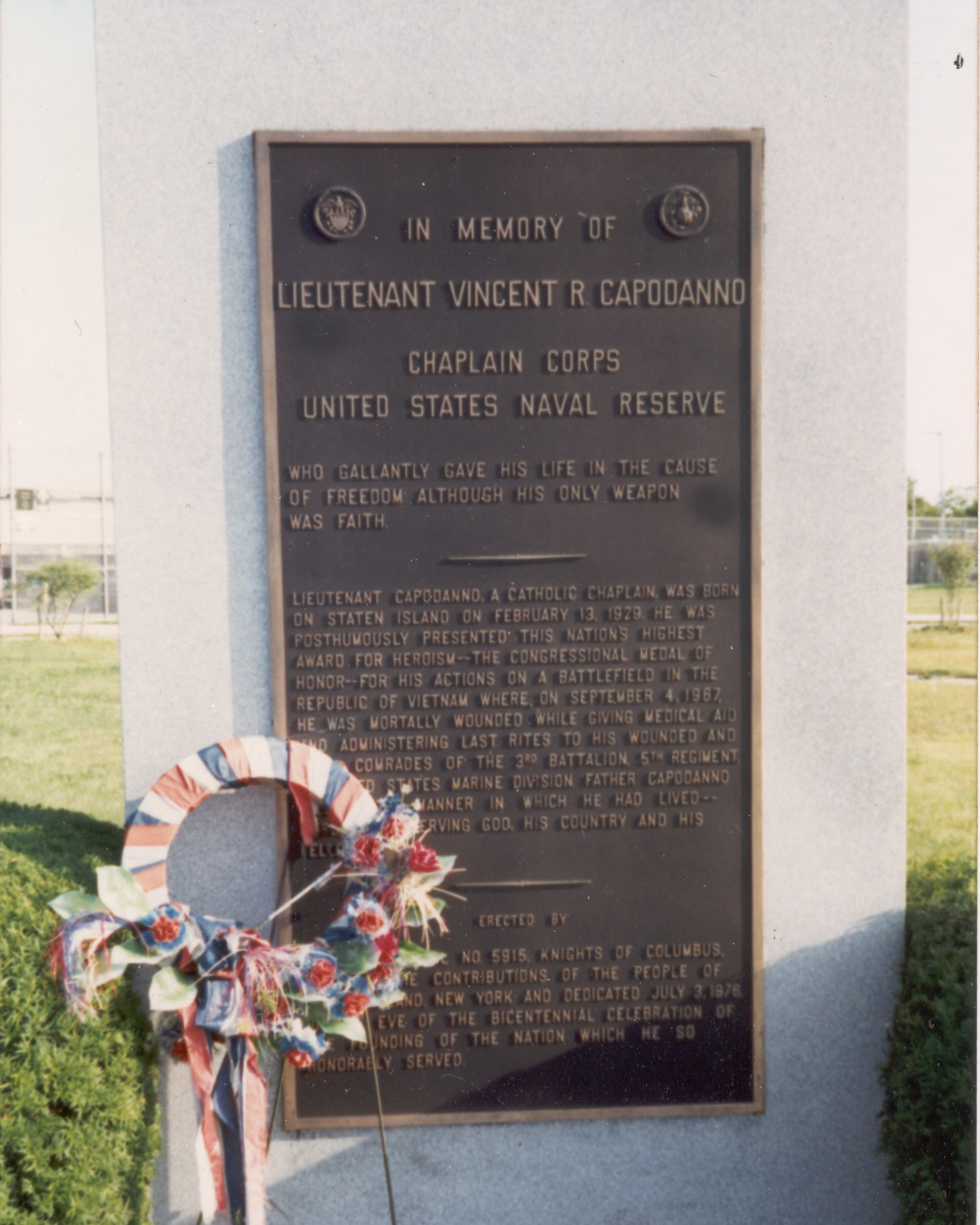
Monument to Vincent Capadanno, at the corner of Sand Lane and Father Capodanno Boulevard

Fountain of the Dolphins is a statue at South Beach by sculptor Steven Dickey. It was donated in 1998 by the Staten Island borough president and consists of six bronze depictions of dolphins, attached to poles with multicolored water jets.

The Capodanno Memorial was named after Father Vincent R. Capodanno, a local resident who was a chaplain in the United States Navy and was killed in 1967 during the Vietnam War. A granite monument on the boardwalk was dedicated to him in 1976, and Seaside Boulevard was renamed after Capodanno the same year. Located at Sand Lane and Fr. Capodanno Boulevard, the memorial consists of a bronze and steel tablet recessed in a granite stele.

The Midland Beach War Memorial is located near Fr. Capodanno Boulevard and Midland Avenue. It is composed of a three-paneled upright slab of Barre granite. An eagle figure is inscribed atop the pedestal.

=== Ben Soto Skate Park ===
The Ben Soto Skate Park is a skateboarding and BMX biking park located at the Midland Beach Playground. The skate park is composed of concrete and metal. It was opened in 2005 and named in honor of a local Marine who died four years prior. By 2010, the skate park had deteriorated and the soon-to-be U.S. Representative for Staten Island, Michael Grimm, had promised to fix it. Since being renovated in 2011, the skate park has been criticized by local skateboarders and bikers who state that it lacks a variety of traditional skatepark features such as ramps.

== History ==
=== Predecessors ===
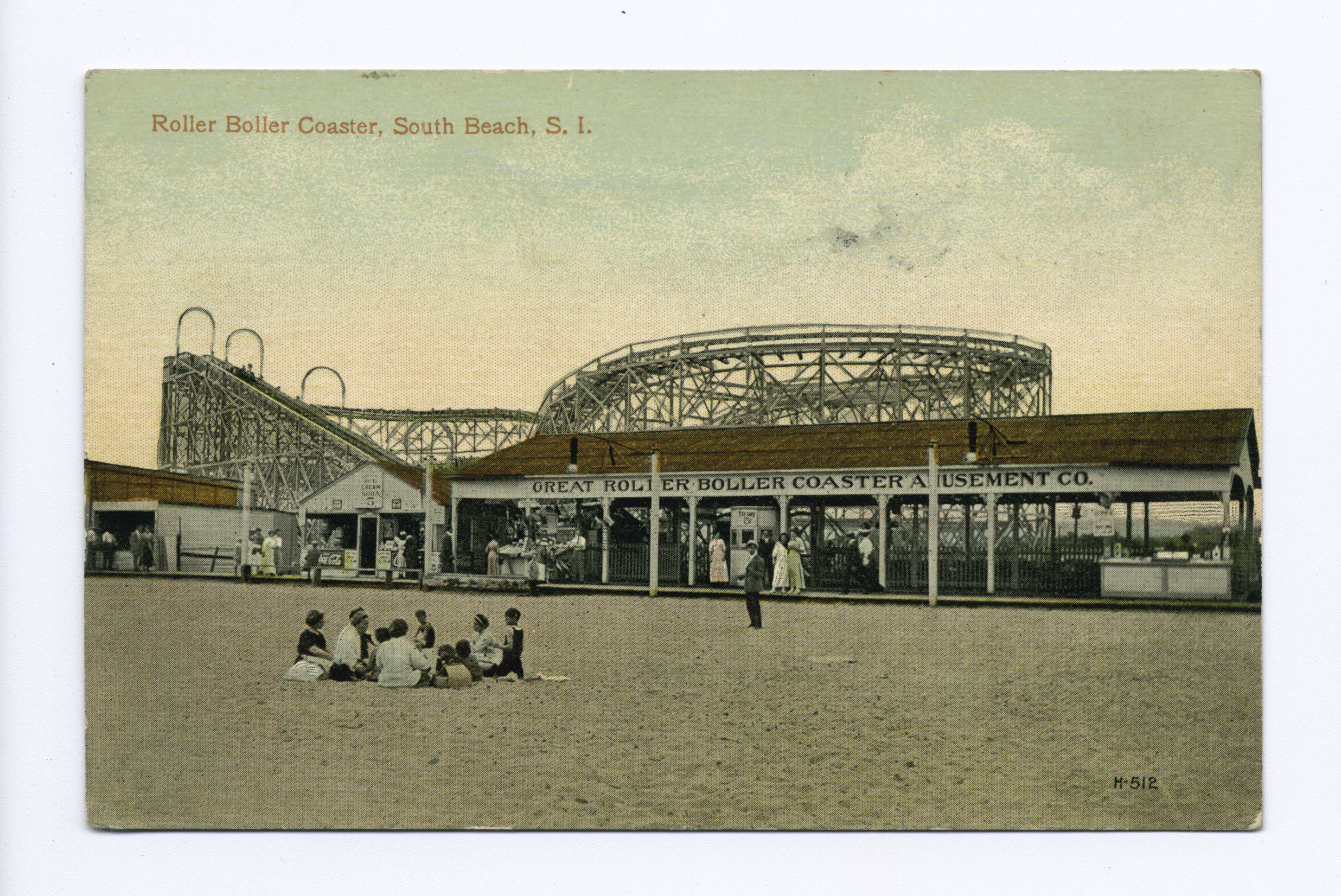
The Roller Boller Coaster (1907–1917) was one of several coasters to be built in South Beach

Staten Island's East Shore was originally settled by the Dutch, who created the modern-day neighborhoods of Midland Beach and South Beach. Though summer homes were built along the beach in the mid-18th century, these areas remained rural until the later portion of the century. By 1882, businessmen realized that the area could be developed as a resort, and amusements such as theaters, hotels, bathing pavilions, and casinos were added along the shore. In particular, two amusement parks were developed on the site of the modern-day boardwalk: Happyland Amusement Park and Midland Beach. In 1884, opened the South Beach Branch of the Staten Island Railway, which in turn led to the Staten Island Ferry at St. George Terminal. As a result of its easy accessibility from Brooklyn and Manhattan, the resorts evolved into amusement places similar to Coney Island. The sites of the amusement areas are now occupied by the South Beach–Franklin Delano Roosevelt Boardwalk.

By the mid-1880s, South Beach's amusement area consisted of a 1,700-foot (520 m) boardwalk, a beach, and numerous rides. After much of the area was destroyed by a fire in September 1896, the 15-acre (6.1 ha) Happyland Amusement Park, an enclosed park with numerous attractions and landscape features, opened on June 30, 1906. Among the park's attractions were a beachfront of 1,000 feet (300 m), a 1,500-foot (460 m) pier, a 30-foot-wide (9.1 m) boardwalk, a system of over 10,000 lights, and numerous attractions and roller coasters.

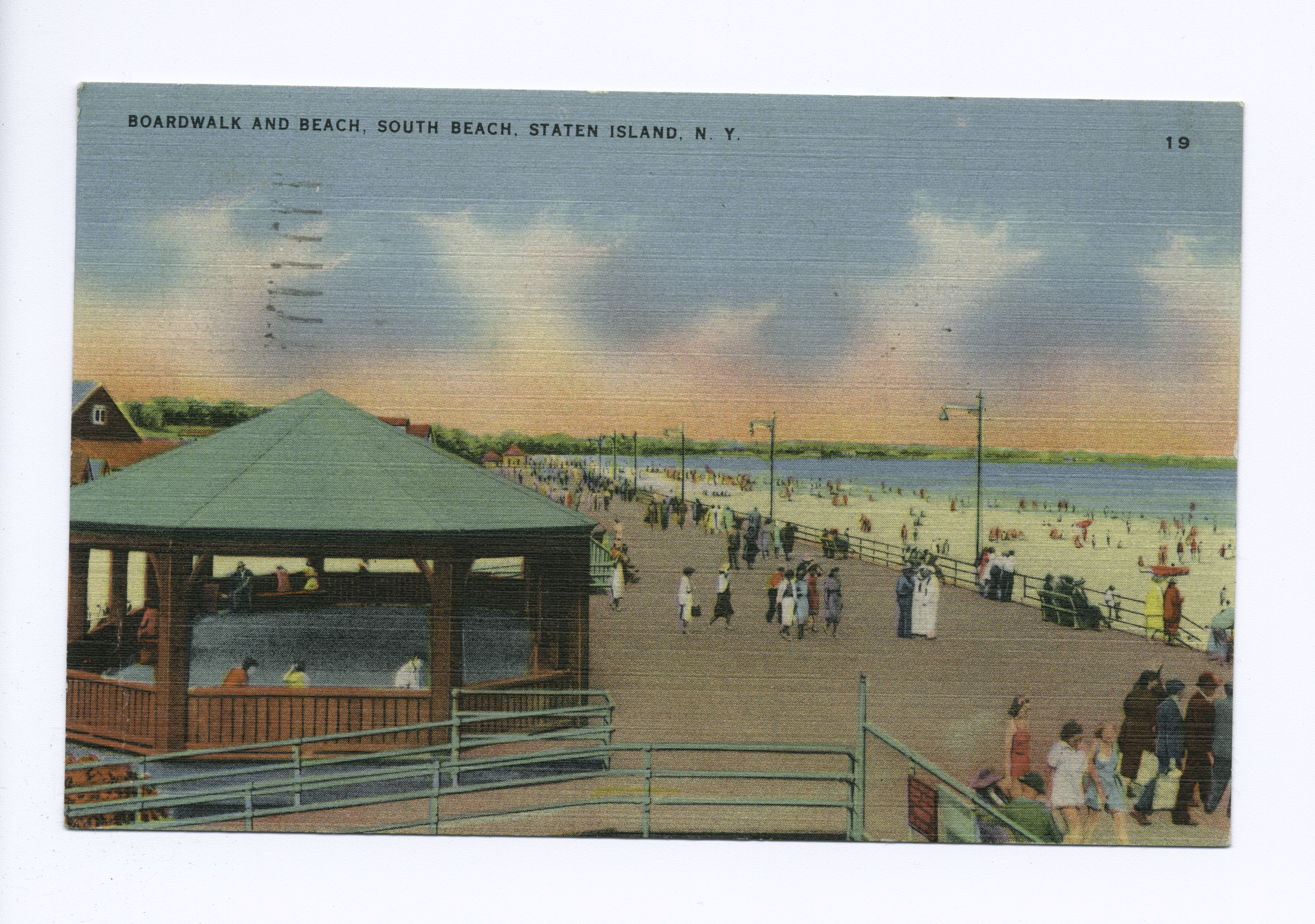
Undated postcard of South Beach

Midland Beach, located southwest of South Beach, became a resort by the 1890s when the South Beach Branch came to the area. It contained a 1,700-foot (520 m) pier jutting into the Atlantic Ocean, where visitors could catch the steamboat William Story to the Battery at the tip of Lower Manhattan. The pier was so long that the Midland Beach Railway Company operated a miniature railroad to take fishermen and other visitors to the end of the pier. Like South Beach, it offered theater performances, a beach, picnicking areas, snack kiosks, numerous hotels and bungalows, and several amusement attractions and roller coasters. The beach also contained a boardwalk.

During World War I, air and water pollution quality and fears of German attacks discouraged tourists from coming to Staten Island. However, visitation rebounded after the war, and by 1923 Staten Island was seeing record-high numbers of visitors, including 150,000 on a single day in June 1923. The parks were mostly destroyed following a series of devastating fires in the 1920s. A 1919 fire in South Beach destroyed much of the amusement area there. A pair of fires also affected Midland Beach in 1924: the first severely reduced the ability of boats to travel to Midland Beach, while the second destroyed part of the amusement area. Both amusement areas were rebuilt, only for both to burn down in 1929. One remnant of the amusement area, the 1-acre (0.40 ha) South Beach Amusement Park at the northern end of South Beach, continued to operate through the end of the 20th century, though much of that park was destroyed in 1955. Beachland Amusements, an adjacent amusement arcade, operated from 1941 to 2006 and was the last amusement attraction on the South Beach–Franklin Delano Roosevelt Boardwalk.

=== Construction and opening ===
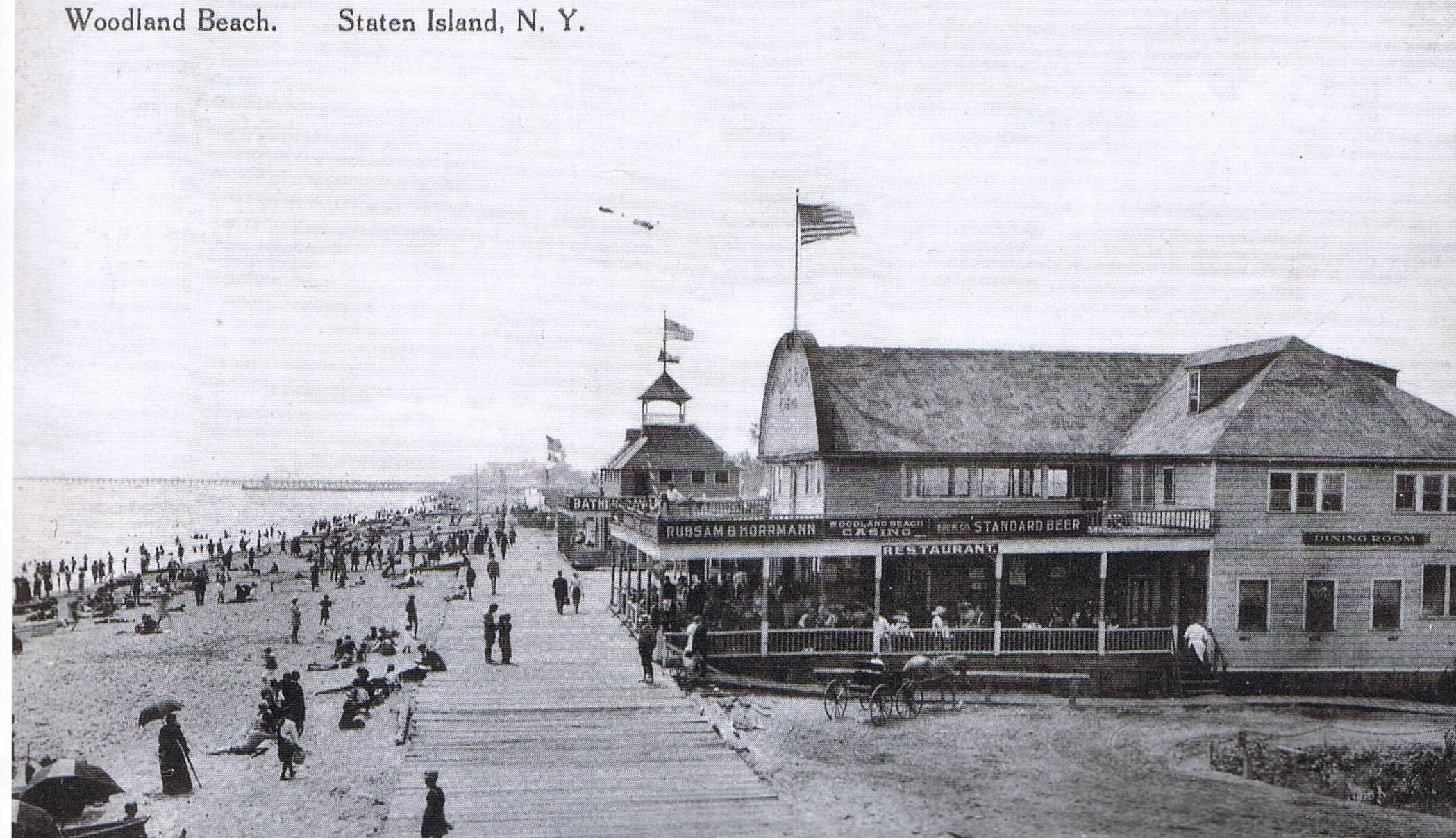
Woodland Beach boardwalk and casino

A law passed by the New York State Legislature in 1930 allocated $1 million for the construction of a beach and boardwalk at Staten Island, running between Fort Wadsworth and Miller Field. In 1934, the New York City Board of Estimate changed the city's zoning map so that the 2.5-mile (4.0 km) shorefront along South, Graham, Midland, and Woodland Beaches would be public land. Subsequently, Staten Island borough president Joseph A. Palma proposed constructing a boardwalk to connect South Beach and New Dorp. The 2.5-mile boardwalk was to cost $2 million and would be built by the Works Progress Administration (WPA). Part of the cost would be funded by the Public Works Administration. The project was expected to raise real estate prices, similar to previous boardwalk projects in New York City.

On August 11, 1935, officials held three groundbreaking ceremonies with more than 10,000 spectators combined, which marked the start of construction. Work on the boardwalk itself did not begin until a month later. Palma estimated that the work would employ up to 4,000 people. New York City Department of Parks and Recreation (NYC Parks) commissioner Robert Moses criticized the boardwalk, saying that its development would encourage private developers to block access to the beach. The project was described as a mixture of Coney Island's Riegelmann Boardwalk and Jones Beach.

The plans called for a 180-foot-wide (55 m) beach to be built before the boardwalk, but construction did not progress in that exact sequence, which resulted in some parts of the boardwalk site being flooded at high tide. As a result, WPA employees sometimes worked 6-hour days and other times worked less than 4 hours in a day. Nevertheless, the boardwalk was built relatively quickly, and the first 1-mile (1.6 km) section between Fort Wadsworth and South Beach was nearly completed by the end of 1936. Twelve jetties and a parallel beach section had also been completed, though a section across New Creek in Midland Beach was progressing slowly. By June 1937, the entire boardwalk was essentially completed. An official opening ceremony was held on July 4, 1937, and was attended by 25,000 people. Upon its opening the boardwalk was named after U.S. president Franklin D. Roosevelt, who participated in the ceremonies remotely.

=== Early years ===
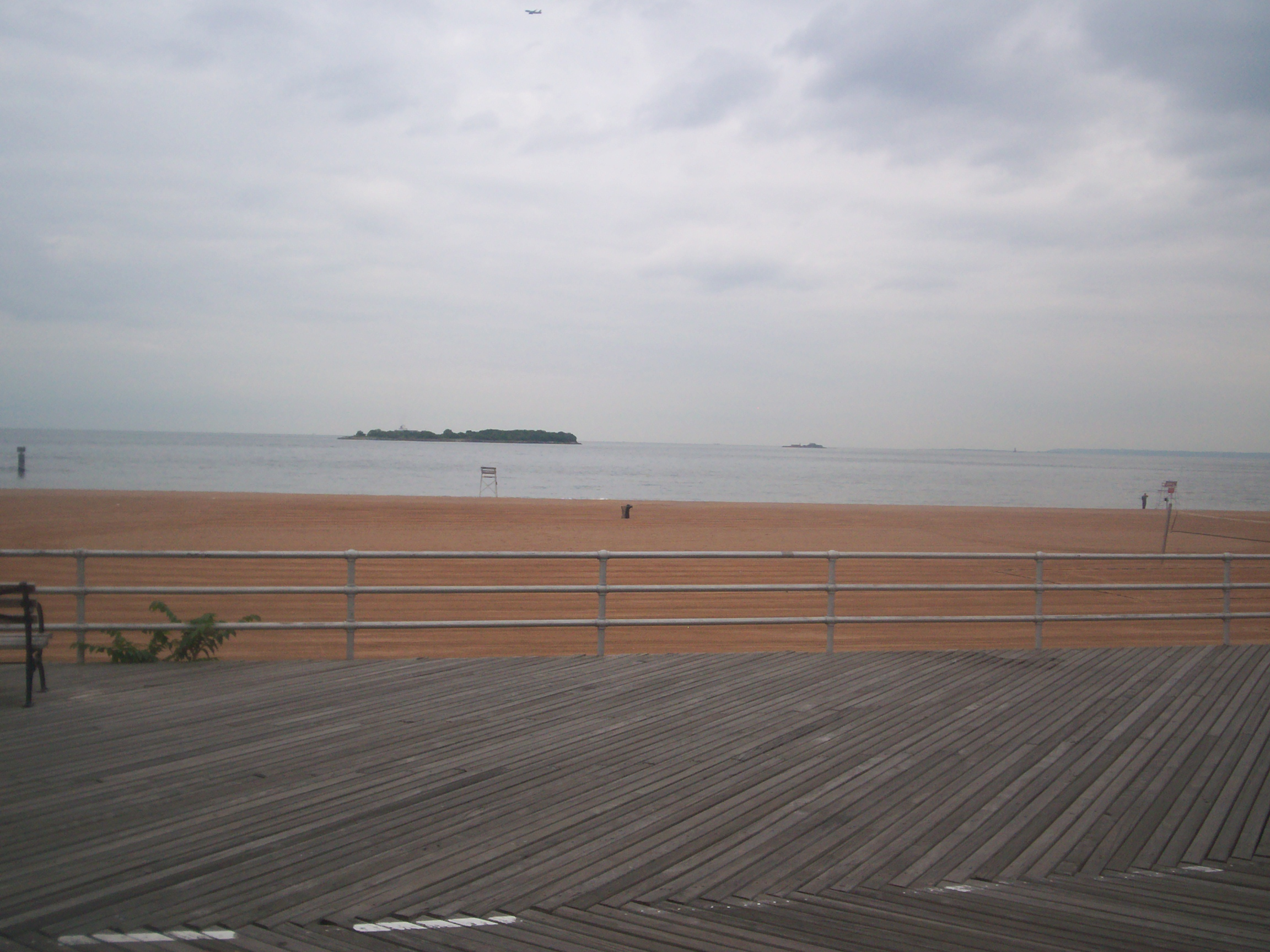
Hoffman Island (left) and Swinburne Island (right) seen from the boardwalk

In September 1937, three hundred bathhouses on the newly completed boardwalk burned down. The United States Army announced plans for a pier at Lily Pond Avenue, at the northern end of the FDR Boardwalk, in 1940. The pier would support their activities on nearby Hoffman Island and Swinburne Island. Furthermore, a NYC Parks rule initially prevented wounded war veterans from using the South Beach–Franklin Delano Roosevelt Boardwalk due to regulations preventing wheelchairs from using the boardwalk. As a result, in 1945 Palma arranged an agreement whereupon these veterans could instead use Midland Beach, which at the time was privately owned.

Staten Island borough president Edward G. Baker and NYC Parks commissioner Moses proposed a redevelopment of the South Beach–Franklin Delano Roosevelt Boardwalk in 1953. Baker and Moses stated that the redevelopment of the boardwalk would serve to improve the quality of Staten Island's East Shore in general, similar to how the Rockaway Boardwalk's construction had improved the Rockaways. At the time, 1.2 million people per year were visiting the beach and boardwalk. The $6.46 million redevelopment of Staten Island's East Shore beaches was commenced the following March, though the project was not approved until that May. Moses also proposed to charge 25 cents for parking and 10 cents to enter the boardwalk, drawing up to 2.4 million people within 30 years.

The development included adding bathhouses; parking lots with spaces for 7,000 cars; several small bus terminals; comfort stations; and recreational facilities such as playgrounds, baseball fields, handball courts, roller hockey fields, skateparks, shuffleboard courts, bocce courts, and checkers tables. Some 2,000,000 cubic yards (1,500,000 m^{3}) of fill were dredged from the Lower New York Bay to protect the adjacent uplands. Moses claimed that in the original project, the area inland of the boardwalk was too narrow to accommodate recreational facilities, but that the city now had the land on which to build these facilities. The project also included the construction of Seaside Boulevard parallel to the boardwalk (now Fr. Capodanno Boulevard), the first section of which opened in 1957.

The first portion of the renovation was completed in 1958. When the project was entirely completed in the 1960s, it included three sections, the original South Beach as well as two new sections at Graham and Midland Beaches. The renovation was performed in conjunction with the planning of what would become the Verrazzano–Narrows Bridge, which would provide Staten Island's first physical connection to the rest of New York City. Close to $1 million for additional improvements to the South Beach–Franklin Delano Roosevelt Boardwalk was allocated in 1967, and additional funds were disbursed under the Public Works Employment Act of 1977.

=== Decline ===
The boardwalk started to decline in the 1950s because of issues such as water pollution, caused by sewage outflows from Manhattan and New Jersey flowing into the bay. By the 1960s, even some lifeguards were refusing to swim in the water near the South Beach–Franklin Delano Roosevelt Boardwalk. Another issue was the withdrawal of Staten Island Railway services from South Beach in the mid-1950s, basically isolating the boardwalk from all except residents of nearby areas. The 1970s saw several arson attempts as well as a high concentration of drug users and prostitutes. In 1971, the city studied replacing the city's boardwalks with plastic to make them easier to maintain, though this did not come to fruition.

The beaches along the South Beach–Franklin Delano Roosevelt Boardwalk remained polluted, and in 1983, New York City Comptroller Harrison J. Goldin rated the boardwalk's quality as "poor" due to polluted waters and badly maintained boardwalks. At the time, the beach only saw 1,200 visitors on a busy day. In 1985, a small part of the South Beach–Franklin Delano Roosevelt Boardwalk, as well as three other city beaches and Central Park's Sheep Meadow, were designated as "quiet zones" where loud radio-playing was prohibited. In the mid-1980s, the NYC Parks budget increased greatly, allowing the agency to renovate two ballfields at the boardwalk in 1986, as well as install new benches. Meanwhile, the water pollution near the boardwalk became so bad that the city stopped placing lifeguards in 1990. The beach and boardwalk continued to be affected by vandalism, pollution, and general neglect.

=== Revival ===
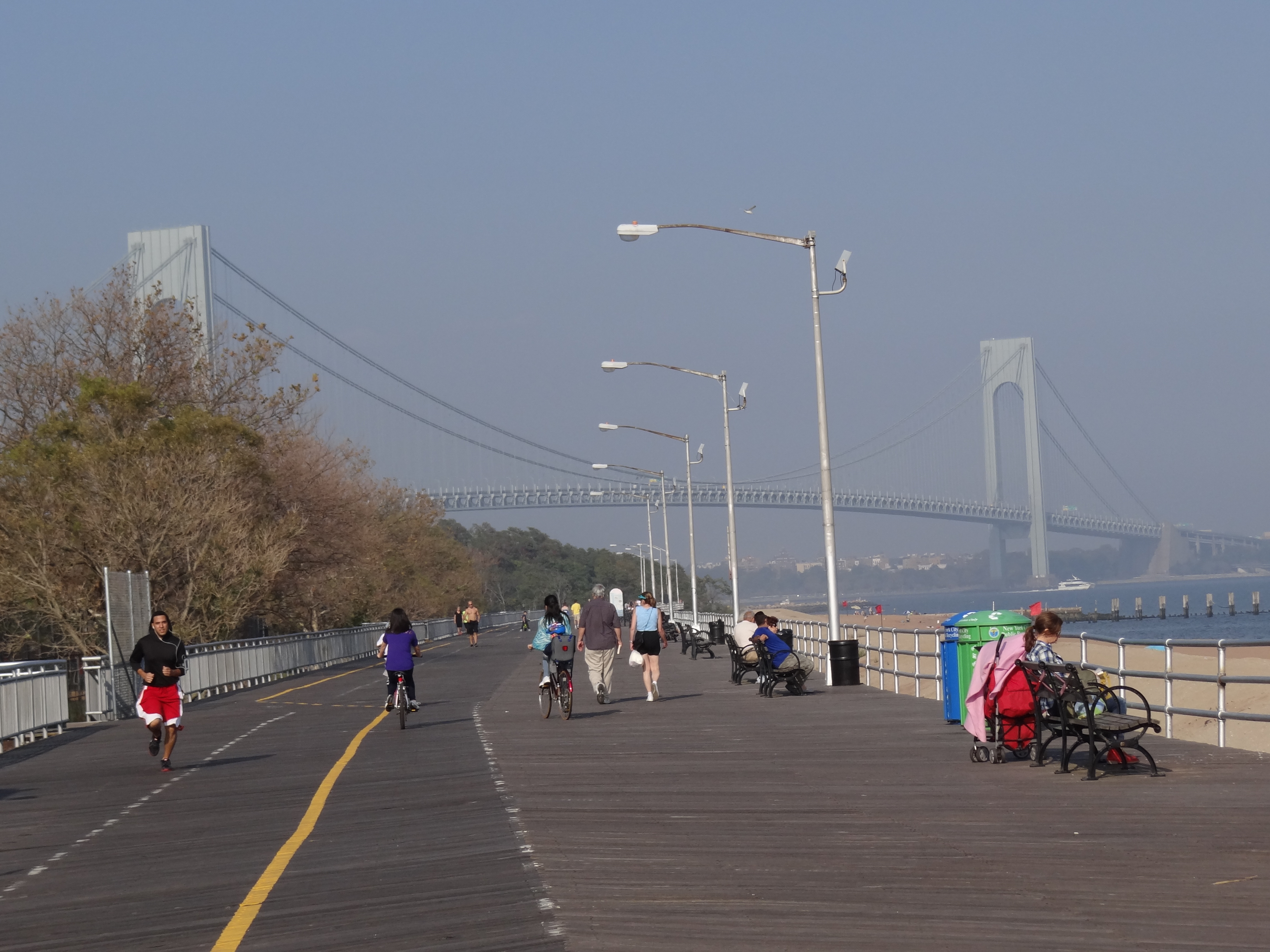
Bike lane

The beachfront received a major overhaul during the 1990s. In May 1994, following an accidental fire that destroyed 200 feet (61 m) of the boardwalk, then-borough president Guy Molinari announced that the damaged section of boardwalk would receive a $650,000 renovation. Several million dollars of funds were allocated for multiple related projects. These included the conversion of parking lots into South Beach Park, which opened in June 1996; reconstruction of the fire-damaged section of boardwalk; and renovation of a playground. NYC Parks also started looking for concessionaires for a pavilion at Sand Lane, which had previously been damaged in a fire. New recreation facilities for senior citizens and a program of concerts were also added. The renovation of the South Beach–Franklin Delano Roosevelt Boardwalk came with a cleanup of the waterfront, as well as full funding for lifeguards, who started working at South Beach again in July 1997. The rebuilt boardwalk opened in October 1997.

Other improvements to the boardwalk were made under the administration of Molinari and his successor, James Molinaro. The improvements included the addition of a Dolphin Fountain at the boardwalk's northern end and a veterans' monument called Freedom Circle at its southern end. New parking lots, a $1.8 million pavilion, and new lighting were also installed. The Ocean Breeze Fishing Pier, a steel and concrete recreational pier, opened in September 2003. At 835 feet (255 m), it is the largest oceanfront recreational pier built in the New York metropolitan area in over a century. According to one estimate, some $20 million had been allocated to the improvement of South Beach–Franklin Delano Roosevelt Boardwalk since 1995.

In 2002, NYC Parks started enforcing an obscure rule prohibiting bicycling on the boardwalk. Afterward, a segregated bike lane was painted on the boardwalk. The beaches continued to suffer from pollution. A New York City Council report in 2004 designated South Beach and Boardwalk as the dirtiest of the city's seven beaches. A separate, independent survey in 2007 rated South Beach as being "challenged", though Midland Beach was in much better condition. In a 2009 survey, South Beach's boardwalk, facilities, and beach had been rated as being poorly maintained, but by 2011, it was rated as the best-maintained beach in the city, in even better condition than Midland Beach.

Wi-Fi service from AT&T was enabled along the boardwalk in 2012, making it one of several Wi-Fi hotspots around the city. That October, the South Beach–Franklin Delano Roosevelt Boardwalk was damaged by Hurricane Sandy. Over a period of nine months, portions of the boardwalk were gradually repaired and reopened, and NYC Parks workers from other boroughs were sent to Staten Island to repair the boardwalk quickly. One damaged portion of the boardwalk, an ADA-accessible ramp to the beach, was not repaired until 2018. In June 2022, the United States Congress provided funds for the East Shore Seawall paralleling the boardwalk; construction began at the end of that year. The boardwalk was deteriorating by late 2025, with issues such as exposed nails and broken boards, and Mayor Eric Adams and Borough President Vito Fossella subsequently agreed to establish a maintenance fund for the South Beach Boardwalk. In early 2026, the city announced that the fund would provide $700,000 per year and that a maintenance team would be hired specifically to carry out repairs on the boardwalk.
