= Tompkins Avenue =

Avenue in Staten Island, New York

Coordinates: 40°36′43.5″N 74°4′15.12″W

- Length: 1.60 mi (2.57 km)
- Location: Staten Island
- West end: Broad Street/Canal Street
- East end: School Road/Lincoln Place; McClean Avenue (orphaned segment)

Tompkins Avenue is a main artery in northeastern Staten Island, New York City, United States. It connects southern Tompkinsville in the north to northern Arrochar in the south, passing through the Fort Wadsworth, Rosebank, Shore Acres, Clifton, and Stapleton neighborhoods. It is mostly a residential street, though it also has commercial districts.

Named for former New York governor Daniel D. Tompkins, notable cross streets include Hylan Boulevard (named for former New York City Mayor John Hylan, and Vanderbilt Avenue (named for Cornelius Vanderbilt).

== Route ==
Between Hylan Boulevard and the Staten Island Railway overpass, Tompkins Avenue becomes one of Rosebank's two commercial districts (the other being along Bay Street). Landmarks include the Garibaldi-Meucci Museum, a historic site honoring the lives of Italian revolutionary Giuseppe Garibaldi and Italian American inventor Antonio Meucci, as well as the Roman Catholic Parish of St. Joseph, which was established by Italian-Americans in 1902. This section of Tompkins Avenue, off St. Mary's Avenue, was renamed Monsignor John T. Servodidio Way in 2009 to honor the late John T. Servodidio, who had been pastor of that church from 1983 to 2009.

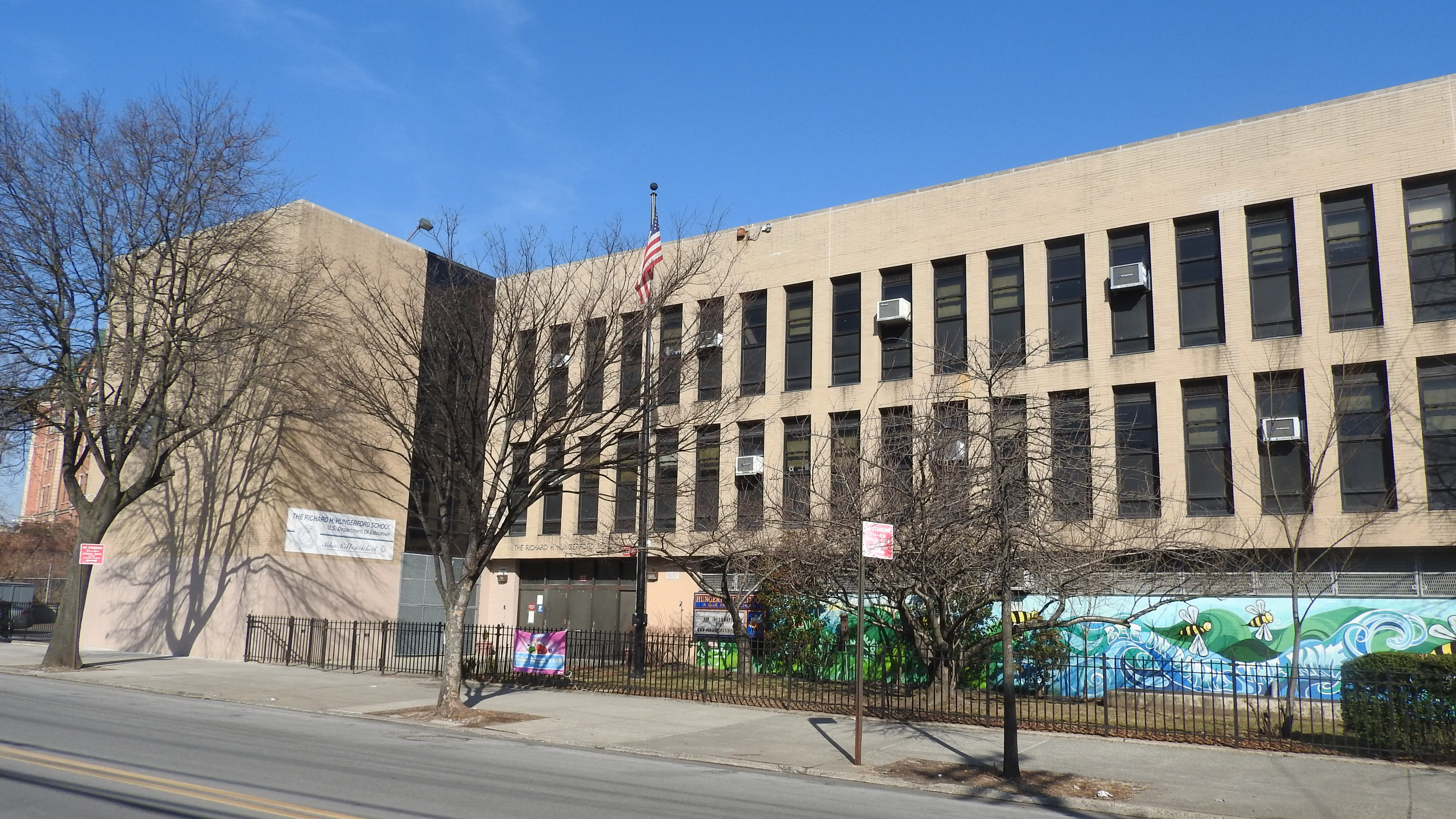
Hungerford school, PS 721

Tompkins Avenue is residential again from the Staten Island Railway north to Vanderbilt Avenue.

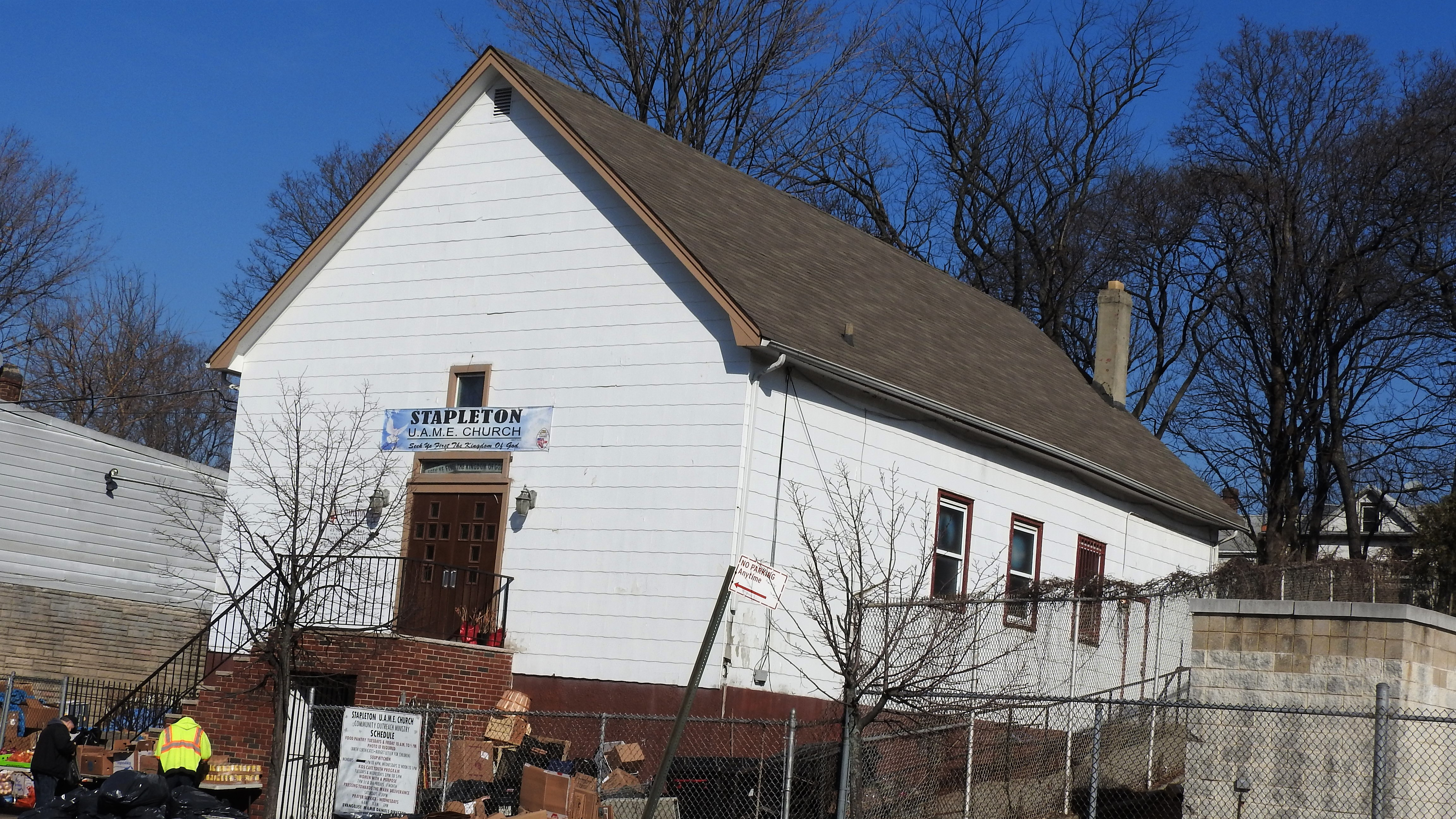
Stapleton AME Church

Landmarks between Vanderbilt Avenue and Broad Street include the St. Elizabeth Ann Healthcare and Rehabilitation Center, a nursing home opened in 1990 that is run by the Sisters of Charity; a campus of the Richard H. Hungerford School; and the Stapleton United African Methodist Church, which was established in 1801. This section of Tompkins Avenue was renamed Rev. Dr. Beasley Way in 1999 to honor the late William Herman Beasley, who had been pastor of that church from 1974 to 1998.

Tompkins Avenue also hosts locations for two United States Postal Service post offices

The construction of the Verrazzano–Narrows Bridge in the late 1950s left one small segment of Tompkins Avenue severed from the rest of the roadway. This orphaned piece now only serves as a side street between the ends of McClean Avenue and Major Avenue.

== Transportation ==
Tompkins Avenue is served by the S52 bus north of Fingerboard Road, along with the S78 (all trips) and SIM30 (Rosebank only) north of Hylan Boulevard. The Grant City-bound S51 runs on a small portion from School Road to Lily Pond Avenue. Tompkins was also formerly served by the X18 express bus to Manhattan.

Although Tompkins Avenue passes over the Staten Island Railway right-of-way, no station exists there. The Fort Wadsworth Station at one time did exist at the foot of Tompkins Avenue, near School Road along the Staten Island Rapid Transit's former South Beach line. The line ceased operation in 1953 but the overpass over its right-of-way still exists to this day, carrying Tompkins Avenue's traffic between Fingerboard Road and School Road.
