= New York Harbor Storm-Surge Barrier =

Proposed infrastructure to protect the New York metro area

External videos
- Video animation of originally proposed Outer Harbor Barrier in operation (4:11).
- Video animation of Verrazano Barrier's more open design (0.30).

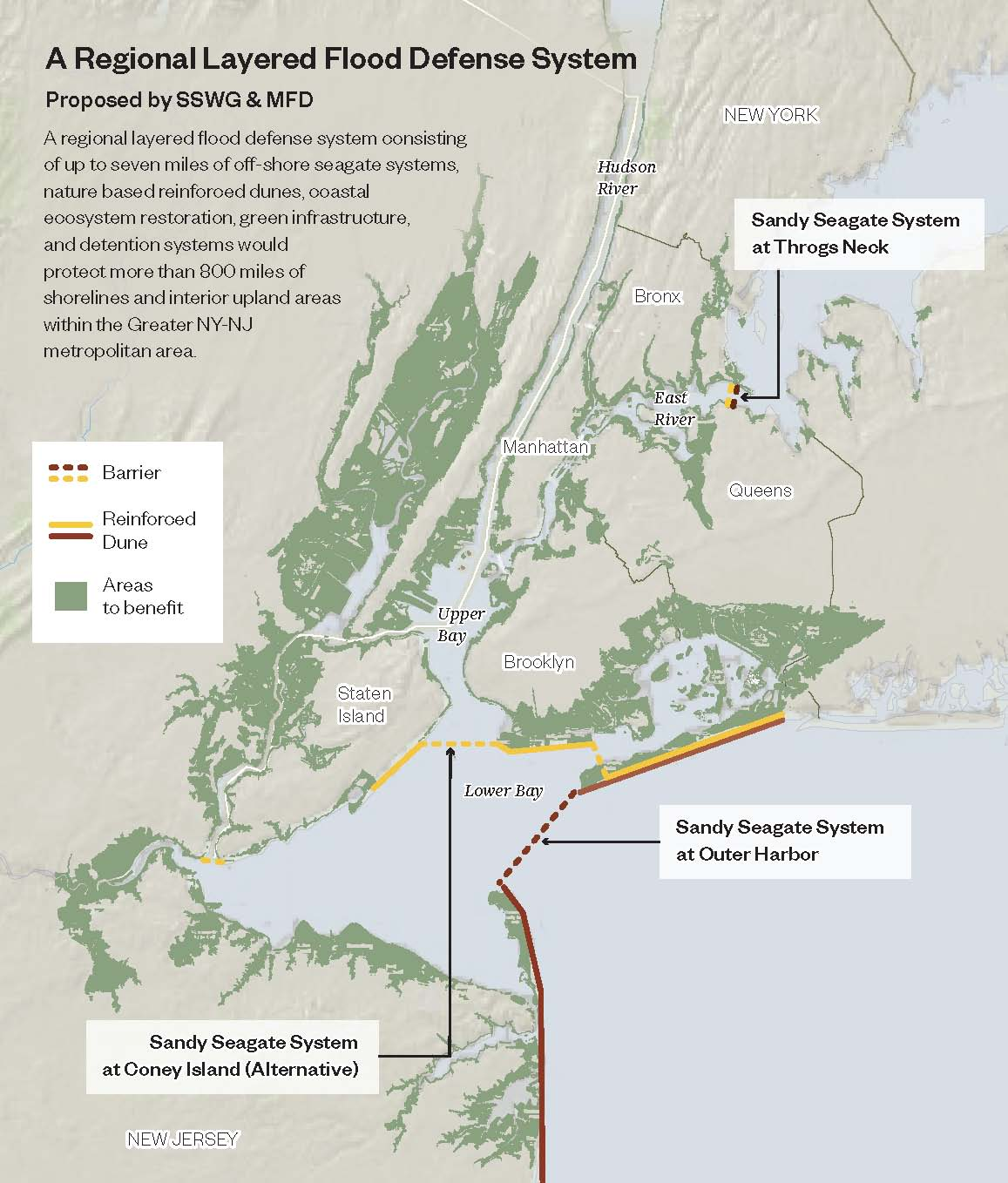
Map of proposed storm surge storm surge barrier system for New York Harbor.

The New York Harbor Storm-Surge Barrier is a proposed flood barrier system to protect the New York-New Jersey Harbor Estuary from storm surges. The proposed system would consist of one barrier located across the mouth of Lower New York Bay, possibly between Sandy Hook (N.J.) and Rockaway (N.Y.), and a second on the upper East River to provide a ring of protection to most of the bi-state region. Through extensive use of floodgates, both barriers would have largely open cross-sections during normal conditions to minimize environmental impacts on the estuary and port operations.

Alternatively, the southern barrier could be located between Coney Island and Staten Island. A storm surge barrier at this location would be half as long, but it would require supplemental barriers across the entrances to Jamaica Bay and the Arthur Kill.

To address the problem of sea level rise, smaller-scale projects to increase seawall heights or otherwise raise vulnerable coastlines would be necessary. Thus a storm-surge barrier system combined with coastline adjustments would form a two-tiered strategy to protect the region. The barrier system could also be extended eastward, filling in the gaps between barrier islands, to protect the various communities lining the south shore of Long Island.

The proposal was developed in the wake of Hurricane Sandy by the Metropolitan NY-NJ-LI Storm Surge Working Group (SSWG), composed of prominent civic leaders, social scientists, oceanographers, engineers, and architects. The group is chaired by Malcolm Bowman, a professor of physical oceanography at the State University of New York at Stony Brook. Within the proposed barrier system lies crucial infrastructure such as the seaports and maritime facilities; ground-level and underground transportation terminals; three major international airports; subway and roadway tunnels; hospitals; communication centers; the industrial complex of northern New Jersey; as well as the millions of residents at risk in New York City and coastal New Jersey north of Sandy Hook.

== Need ==
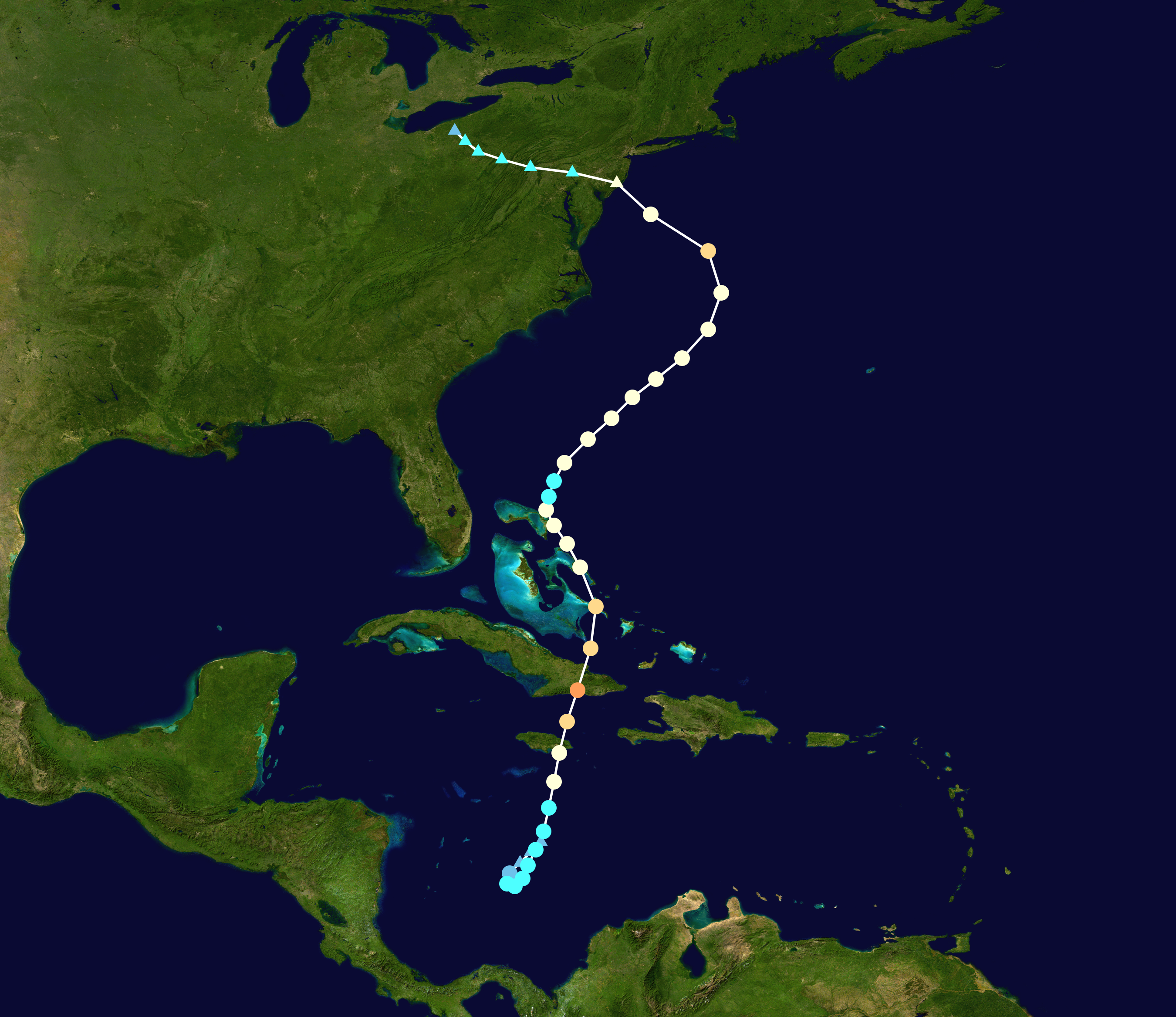
Map plotting Hurricane Sandy's track and intensity, according to the Saffir–Simpson scale Map key Saffir–Simpson scale Tropical depression (≤38 mph, ≤62 km/h) Tropical storm (39–73 mph, 63–118 km/h) Category 1 (74–95 mph, 119–153 km/h) Category 2 (96–110 mph, 154–177 km/h) Category 3 (111–129 mph, 178–208 km/h) Category 4 (130–156 mph, 209–251 km/h) Category 5 (≥157 mph, ≥252 km/h) Unknown Storm type Tropical cyclone Subtropical cyclone Extratropical cyclone, remnant low, tropical disturbance, or monsoon depression

The New York-New Jersey Harbor is vulnerable to storm surges that threaten to inundate the region, put in danger large numbers of the metropolitan area's residents, devastate much critical infrastructure and damage some of its most important economic assets. At particular risk are the most vulnerable, low-income communities located in many public housing projects located on low-lying land near to the coast.

The source of energy for all hurricanes is the elevated temperatures of the tropical Atlantic Ocean and the associated warm surface temperatures of the Gulf Stream flowing northwards along the eastern seaboard. Accordingly, hurricanes are most dangerous when their track lies slightly offshore.

Hurricane Sandy's power came from unusually warm water lying off the mid-Atlantic Coast and the merging of two major storm systems. Technically, Sandy was downgraded from a category one hurricane to an extra-tropical storm just before it made landfall in New Jersey on October 29, 2012. Nevertheless, as the largest storm in extent ever recorded by the National Weather Service (at 1100 miles in diameter), Sandy had severe storm-surge impacts on New York and New Jersey.

Because of global warming, oceanographic and meteorological experts currently predict that increasingly warmer future ocean surface temperature is the "new normal", implying that extreme weather events like Hurricanes Sandy and Maria could become more intense and possibly more frequent during future hurricane seasons. As the world's oceans steadily become warmer, storms are becoming stronger and larger. These storms will cause more damage if they follow past storm tracks. For example, research suggests that hurricanes that have hit the New York City area since 1970 are more intense or have larger wind fields, producing higher storm surge and flood risk. When added to rising sea level, what was a 500-year flood event before the anthropogenic era (i.e. pre-1800) is now a 24-year flood event and in 30 years will be a 5-year flood event.

The risks to the New York Metropolitan Region also include wind and flooding damage from winter nor’easter storms which can be as serious, or even more dangerous, than rarer hurricanes. While hurricanes are short and violent, nor’easters tend to persist longer — for several days — also producing large storm surges that ride atop successive high tides that occur twice daily.

Adding to storm surge risks, sea levels are also rising. Over the last 160 years the National Oceanic and Atmospheric Administration's (NOAA's) Battery Park tide gauge has measured the rate of sea-level rise as one foot per century. But sea level rise has begun to accelerate, potentially adding an additional 3–6 feet to current sea level by the end of this century, or possibly more if the melting of the Greenland ice sheet continues at ever increasing rates and huge chunks of ice around Antarctica continue to break off.

== Precedents ==
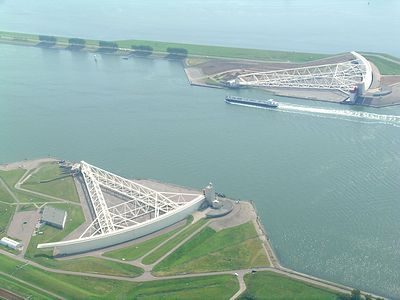
Maeslant Barrier, the Netherlands

Similar, albeit more modestly-sized, but still highly effective storm-surge barriers have been in operation for nearly half a century in three New England communities — the Stamford Hurricane Protection Barrier in Stamford, Conn.; the Fox Point Hurricane Barrier in Providence, R.I.; and the New Bedford Harbor Hurricane Barrier in New Bedford, Mass. Hours before Hurricane Sandy struck Stamford, the city's 17-foot-high movable barrier was closed to withstand an over-11-foot storm tide which struck western Long Island Sound (at some locations on the sound, the storm tide was even higher than the 11.5-foot storm tide measured at The Battery in New York City), devastating every waterfront community on the northwestern coast of the sound — except Stamford.

Larger barrier systems protect more than a dozen major cities, including the Delta Works protecting the south of the Netherlands and the MOSE Project protecting Venice. New storm-surge barriers on Lake Borgne and Lake Pontchartrain are part of the protection for New Orleans after Hurricane Katrina.

The famous Thames Barrier is typically deployed an average of about twice per year, protecting the heart of London from excessive tidal flooding. The Greater London Authority is currently studying proposals to strengthen its defenses.

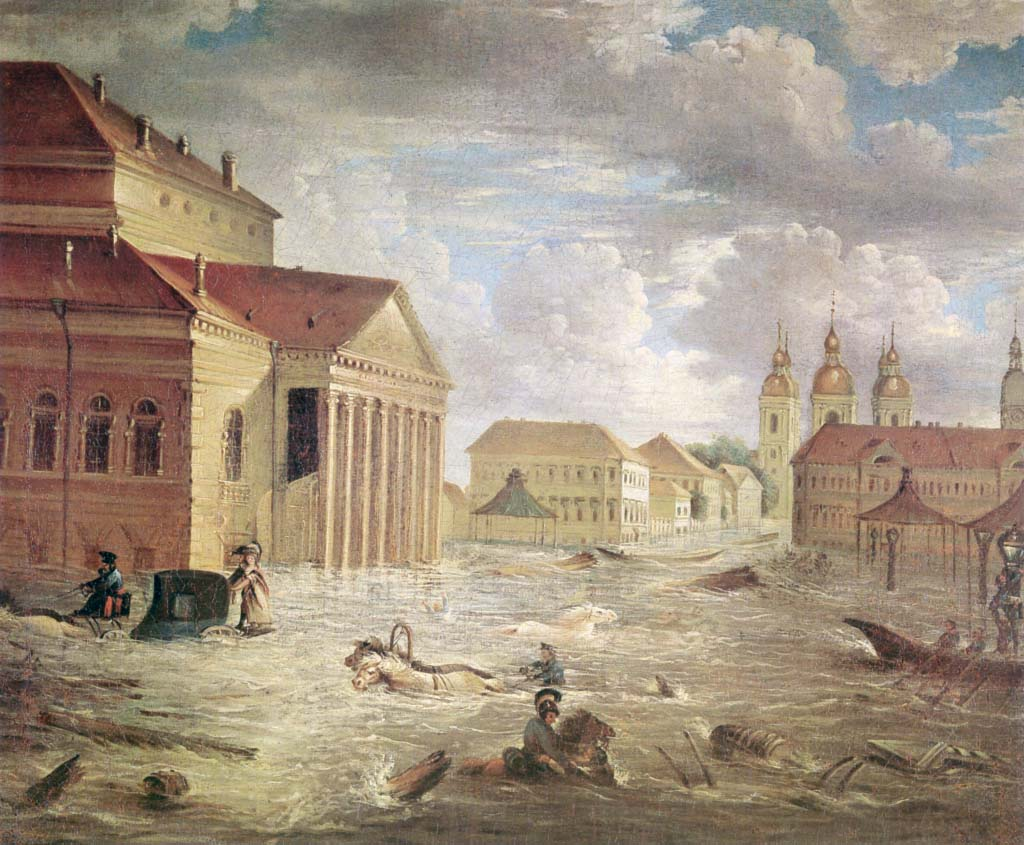
Flooding in St. Petersburg, Russia, during the 1824 flood

The new Saint Petersburg Dam was built to stop the frequent floods in the city, which had often devastated the city. It was first used on November 28, 2011, just months after it was completed, and limited storm water rise to below flood level. It prevented the 309th flood in the history of the city.

== Background ==
During the same period when the New England storm surge barriers were built, the Army Corps of Engineers warned of possible catastrophic storm surge flooding in New York City and discussed a possible storm surge barrier system for New York Harbor. However there was little local interest in such a project.

With funding from the Rockefeller Foundation, Mayor Michael Bloomberg, convened the New York City Panel on Climate Change in August 2008 to investigate the city's vulnerability to a variety of climate-induced risks including the risk of a major storm-surge event. At about the same time, the American Society of Civil Engineers organized a three-day conference and subsequently published a report entitled "Storm-Surge Barriers to Protect New York City Against the Deluge."

After Hurricane Sandy devastated the New York - New Jersey metropolitan area in 2012, governments struggled both to recover and to plan better protection for the future, including regional storm-surge barriers. In his January 2013, State of the State address, New York Governor Andrew Cuomo proposed to "work with other government partners to timely complete a comprehensive engineering evaluation of these potential barrier systems."

The City of New York, under Mayor Michael Bloomberg, organized a "Special Initiative for Rebuilding and Resiliency" (SIRR), which developed a blueprint for reconstruction that was released in June 2013, only eight months after the storm. That over-400-page document describes the demographics and morphology of the region, the storm and its impacts; provides background on extreme weather events including non-storm events such as heat and intense rainfall; describes various resiliency measures and strategies; and describes specific initiatives, studies and projects to be undertaken. Some of these projects are underway, using a combination of federal and local funds.

=== City and regional response ===
Despite Governor Cuomo's announced interest in storm surge barriers, Mayor Bloomberg was reluctant to proceed. But the City asked Dr. Jeroen Aerts, a professor of water and climate risk with the VU University of Amsterdam, the Netherlands, and an expert on water risk management, to compare the costs and benefits of a regional barrier system with those of smaller-scale changes like building levees around sewage treatment plants, raising subway stations entrances, constructing local storm-surge barriers, and flood-proofing or raising buildings according to the FEMA-run National Flood Insurance Program standards. At the same time FEMA intends to redraw flood maps for New York City, placing a much larger area in the flood zone.

Dr. Aerts' report indicated that, assuming a middle scenario for climate change, which includes the combined effect of sea-level rise and increased storm activity, the benefit/cost ratio of investment in a regional barrier would be similar to the ratio for investment in smaller-scale changes. Despite that result, the city's SIRR report dismissed the regional barrier idea without any further study. The report listed seven reasons for doubt about the feasibility:

1. Such a system of barriers would be extraordinarily expensive — perhaps costing $20–25 billion to build.
2. Harbor-wide barriers would require a design, approval and construction process that could take two to three decades to complete.
3. The possible hydrodynamic and environmental impacts on fish migration, siltation, river flow, and water quality are likely to be substantial and are not yet known.
4. To make the project work, massive levees along adjacent coastal areas, including on the Rockaway Peninsula and possibly Coney Island and Staten Island would have dramatic impacts on the character of the beaches and adjacent neighborhoods that may prove to be highly disruptive.
5. Any barriers would create an “insiders/outsiders” dynamic, with only those behind the barriers receiving maximum protection, leaving densely developed communities along the South and North Shores of Long Island and the Jersey Shore outside the protected zone.
6. A harborwide barrier project may also cause additional flooding in areas outside the barriers, making those communities more vulnerable than they would be without such barriers.
7. Finally, since the barriers would be open most of the time (to allow navigation), it would represent a major public investment that would end up doing nothing to address the growing problem of rising sea level.

External media

Images
- Map showing SIRR Phase 1 coastal protection plan.
- Map showing SIRR full coastal protection plan.
- Map showing areas vulnerable to sea-level rise
- Map showing housing units vulnerable to sea-level rise.

Video
- PBS News Hour segment on how New York City is preparing for future hurricanes, October 28, 2013 (8:16).
- PBS News Hour segment on Dutch lessons for protecting New York Harbor, Oct 29, 2013 (8:39).

Instead of a barrier system, the SIRR report identified a plethora of local measures that could be taken by the city. The goal of these measures is to protect vulnerable areas of the city with projects that would be relatively inexpensive, effective and quickly designed and constructed. They include local walls or barriers against storm surge on some sections of the coast. For example, a barrier has been funded as part of an inner defensive ring for Lower Manhattan, to be integrated into the Manhattan Waterfront Greenway.

At the same time that the city was implementing its own local flood mitigation strategy, the MTA, Port Authority of New York and New Jersey and many major institutions and private companies adopted their own localized plans for their facilities. Hoboken and other cities in the region have initiated their own local measures, with support from the U.S. Department of Housing and Urban Development's Rebuild by Design competition. The U.S. Army Corps of Engineers has conducted coastal storm risk reduction studies and beach restoration and resiliency projects.

Because of the variety of governmental entities involved, as well as differing community reaction, there is a lack of coordination on goals and standards of storm protection among the various projects. As a result, these scattered efforts have proved to be more difficult to execute, as well as more expensive than expected, and raise doubt about how much of the shoreline will be protected in the end.

=== Counterarguments ===
Lost in all this activity is the conclusion of Dr. Aerts' study — that because of the expectation of rising sea level and increased global warming, by 2040 the benefit/cost ratio of a regional barrier system will far exceed the ratio for the measures the city is now taking, that a regional barrier may be needed soon, and that planning for it should begin now. "As a Dutchman," Dr. Aerts said, "you are quite surprised to see a large city like New York — so many people exposed and no levees, no protection at all. [That] was astonishing to me. . . . Don't rule out yet the barriers because the sea level is going to rise very quickly, and then you need a barrier."

The Storm Surge Working Group has provided answers to all the objections raised by the city.

1. A barrier system would be expensive, but the city's plan, covering many miles of vulnerable coastline, would be even more expensive. And some of the cost to shore up areas on the sides of the barriers are scheduled to be spent anyway, for example in dune-building projects on the Rockaway peninsula and on Staten Island.
2. If a barrier takes a long time to implement, so do local projects. More than ten years since Sandy struck, local projects have yet to be completed and have experienced the same problems (costs, public resistance, etc.) that were attributed to the regional storm surge barrier approach.
3. With regard to environmental impacts, the barriers' floodgates would be closed only for a few hours before, during and immediately after a major storm surge. Over 99% of the time, floodgates would remain open so as to minimally hinder tides, harbor flushing, river discharge, fish migration and healthy marine ecosystem functioning. An environmental impact study would evaluate whether any hindrance posed by the structure is outweighed by its benefit. Preliminary studies sponsored by the Hudson River Foundation indicate that an outer harbor barrier would minimally decrease tidal flow as long as floodgates allow at least 60% of the barrier cross section to be normally-open. Even that small decrease merely offsets the equally small increase in tidal flow that resulted from digging shipping channels into the harbor over the past 150 years.
4. Reinforced dunes (not levees) will indeed have to be built in the Rockaways and Sandy Hook, and along Coney Island and Staten Island if the alternative barrier location is chosen. In fact in the wake of Hurricane Sandy reinforced dunes are already under construction on the Rockaway Peninsula and Staten Island.
5. Because of the immense lengths of the New York Bight and Atlantic shorelines (Montauk Point, N.Y. to Cape May, N.J.), research has shown that ocean water displaced by the barrier system would only increase coastal surges adjacent to the barrier by a few inches on the ocean and western Long Island Sound sides.
6. While ocean shore communities outside the region would not be protected by two or three barriers around New York Harbor, it may be possible to extend the area to be protected by constructing barriers in gaps between barrier islands along the south shore of Long Island, and south along the Jersey shore, or with barriers oriented perpendicular to the barrier islands, depending on the dominant direction of hurricane winds.
7. With normally-open storm-surge gates, barriers alone will not address sea level rise, but neither will local shoreline storm-surge projects planned by New York City, which will also have gates. The SIRR report, itself, found that by the 2050s 43 miles, or about 8%, of the city's coastline could be at risk of flooding during non-storm conditions. These coastal areas will need to be raised or otherwise protected regardless of additional protections against storm surge.

The two-tiered approach of protecting local coastal areas against slowly changing sea level rise, together with 25-foot offshore barriers to hold back surges of future storms, will give future civic leaders 100 to 150 years to protect, and if necessary migrate, our urban metropolitan civilization to higher ground, and to adopt even more sweeping measures to protect the region from both sea level rise and storm surges.

Another objection to barriers is that restored natural systems, such as created wetlands and oyster beds could provide the same protection. While these proposed solutions should be included in local responses because they can reduce wave action slightly, reinforce presently fragile wetlands and in some cases improve water quality, the reality is that they would be simply overwhelmed by storm surges of the magnitude experienced during Sandy. One naturalistic feature can resist storm-surge—levees or dunes. In fact most of the coastline of the Netherlands is protected in this way. A regional storm surge barrier would depend on dunes along the coast of the Rockaway Peninsula and Sandy Hook, or, for the alternative location, along the coast of Staten Island.

== Army Corps of Engineers study ==
External images
- Map showing USACE Alt. 2 barriers and areas protected.
- Map showing USACE Alt. 3A barriers and areas protected.
- Map showing USACE Alt. 3B barriers and areas protected.
- Map showing USACE Alt. 4 barriers and areas protected.
- Map showing USACE Alt. 5 barriers and areas protected.

In the Fall of 2017, the U.S. Army Corps of Engineers (USACE) initiated a Coastal Storm Risk Management Feasibility Study to evaluate various proposals to address storm surge in the New York and New Jersey harbor area. The New York Harbor Storm-Surge Barrier, modified to increase permeability, is represented by two of five alternatives being considered.

In December, 2020, Congress instructed the USACE to expedite the study, after the Corps had "indefinitely postponed" the project the previous February. The Biden Administration subsequently restarted by the study. A draft Feasibility Report and tier 1 environmental impact study is posted on the USACE website, along with appendices.

To solicit comments on the choice of Alternative 3B as the Tentatively Selected Plan (TSP), the Corps has released a GIS-based summary, a slide presentation, and meeting posters. In response, the Storm Surge Working Group has published a comprehensive layered flood defense strategy, including a critique of the Corps' TSP.

The TSP is essentially a subset of the SIRR's shoreline barrier proposals for New York City with the addition of a floodwall around the Jersey City waterfront district and storm surge barriers at the entrances to Arthur Kill and Kill Van Kill to protect much of northern New Jersey.

After receiving only a portion of the funds requested to complete the HATS study at the end of the Biden Administration, the Corps' New York District changed direction. They decided to advance only three small near-term constructible elements. Completion of the HATS study will depend on future allocation of study funds.

The schedule for the study is as follows:

Study Initiation	Late 2016
NEPA Scoping Period	Feb. – Nov. 2018
Release of the Interim Report	Feb. 2019
Delay due to funding suspension	Feb. 2020 – Sept. 2021
Tentatively Selected Plan (TSP)	May. 2022
Draft Feasibility Report and Tier 1 EIS	Sept. – Oct. 2022
Agency Reviews and Public Meetings	Nov. 2022 – Mar. 2023
Agency Consultations and Confirmation of the TSP	To be determined
Final Feasibility Report and NEPA Documentation	
Chief's Report	
Pre-Construction Engineering and Design Phase & Tier 2 EIS	

== See also ==
- 1893 New York hurricane
- 1938 New England hurricane
- Coastal flood
- Effects of Hurricane Sandy in New Jersey
- Effects of Hurricane Sandy in New York
- Geography of New York–New Jersey Harbor Estuary
- List of New York hurricanes
- Marine life of New York–New Jersey Harbor Estuary
- New York Bight
- Sea Bright–Monmouth Beach Seawall
- East Shore Seawall
- Vision 2020: New York City Comprehensive Waterfront Plan
- Ike Dike proposal for Galveston/Houston
