= East Shore Seawall =

Coordinates: 40°34′21″N 74°5′7″W

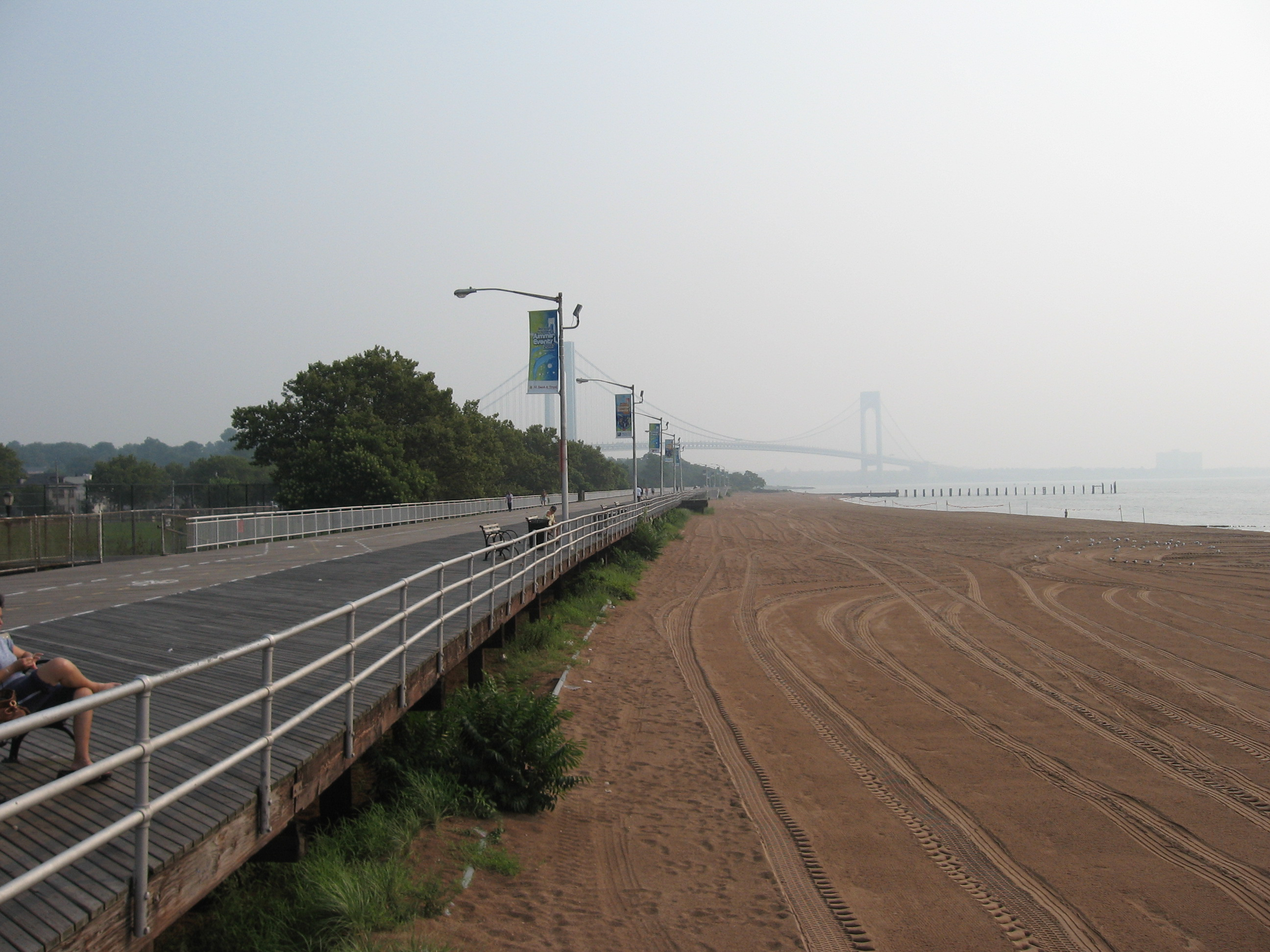
Boardwalk and beach on the East Shore before Hurricane Sandy (2009)

The East Shore Seawall, also known as Staten Island Multi-Use Elevated Promenade, is a 5.2-mile (8.4 km) long combined seawall and esplanade proposed for the eastern shoreline of Staten Island, New York. It would run along the Lower New York Bay linking sections of the Gateway National Recreation Area: Fort Wadsworth at the north, Miller Field, and Great Kills Park to the south. It will roughly parallel Father Capodanno Boulevard and the South Beach–Franklin Delano Roosevelt Boardwalk.

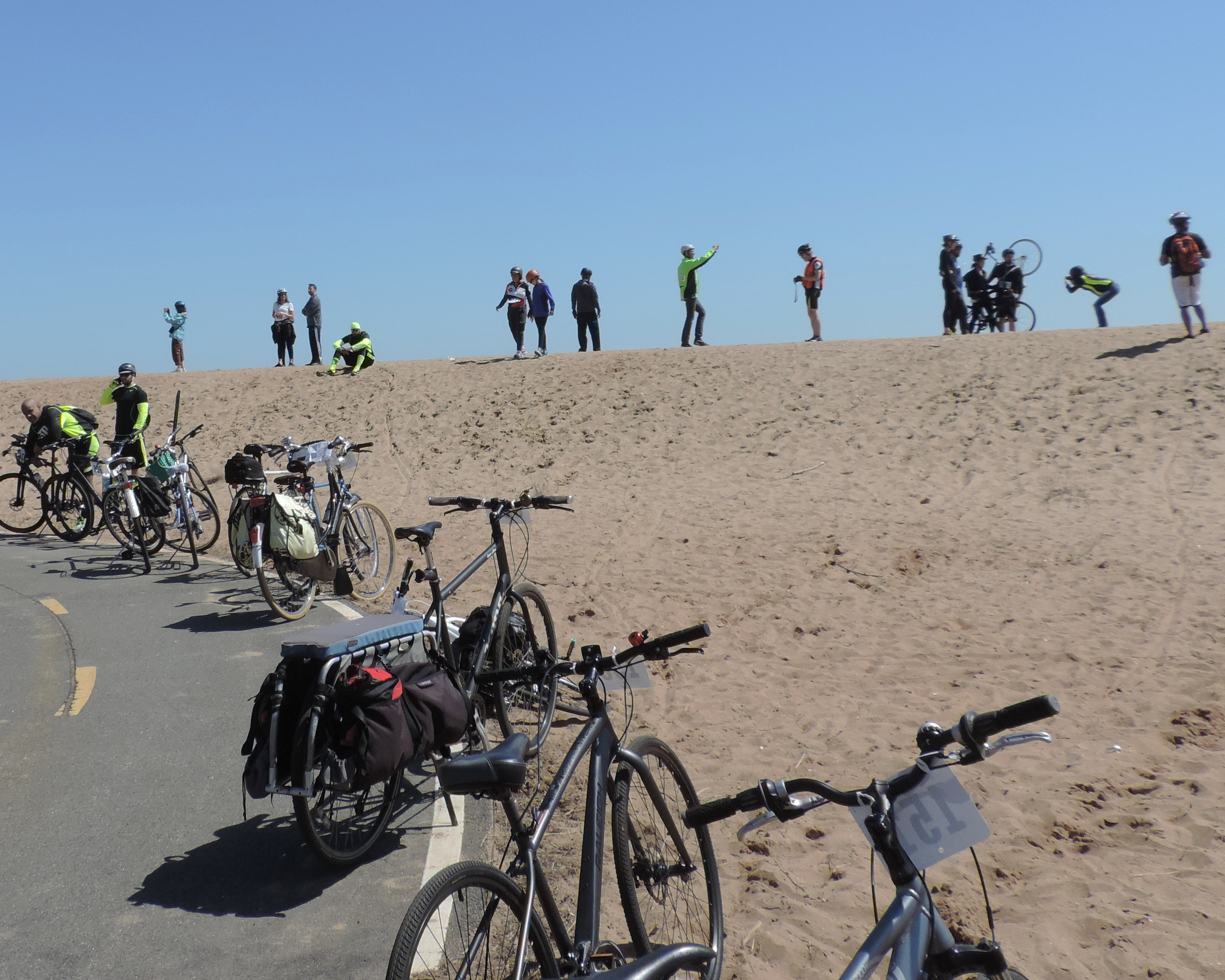
Temporary berm (2015) in New Dorp Beach, placed after Hurricane Sandy

The coastal engineering strategy is to address climate change and sea level rise, and improve resilience along the shoreline of the New York–New Jersey Harbor Estuary and Port of New York and New Jersey. It will be built up to 6 metres (20 ft) above sea level and protect communities from coastal flooding of up to 15.6 feet (4.8 m) (two feet higher than that caused by Hurricane Sandy in 2012). It will includes 4.5 miles (7.2 km) of buried seawall, 0.6 miles (0.97 km) of earthen levee tie-in, 0.35 miles (0.56 km) miles vertical flood wall, more than 300 acres (120 ha) of natural storage, approximately 180 acres (73 ha) of ponding areas and 40 acres (16 ha) acres of tidal wetlands. It will also function as a linear park/greenway with recreational amenities including a boardwalk, biking and walking paths, and will provide access to public beaches.

The project, a collaboration between the US Army Corps of Engineers and the New York State Department of Environmental Conservation, was first announced in May 2017. In 2019, the city allocated $615 million for its design and construction.

Conflicts over environmental remediation has stalled the building of the project, originally projected to be completed in 2024.

Federal legislation to expedite the construction of the seawall was passed in June 2022. It is expected to cost $1.5 billion. Construction was slated to begin at the end of that year.

== See also ==
- Billion Oyster Project
- Freshkills Park
- Vision 2020: New York City Comprehensive Waterfront Plan
- Sea Bright–Monmouth Beach Seawall
- New York Harbor Storm-Surge Barrier
