= Father Capodanno Boulevard =

Boulevard in Staten Island, New York

Coordinates: 40°34′51.95″N 74°4′32.88″W

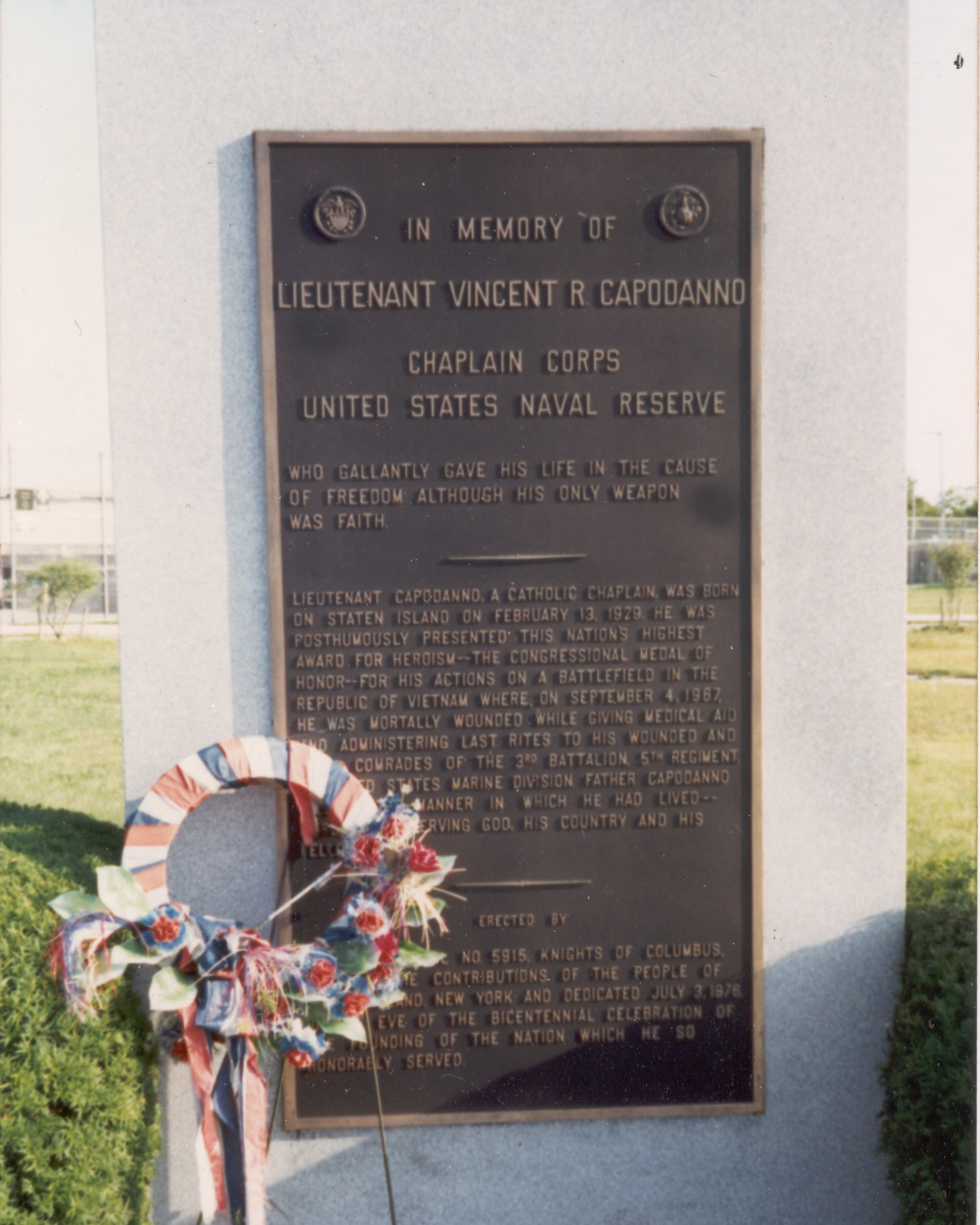
- Monument to Vincent Capodanno, at the corner of Sand Lane and Father Capodanno Boulevard
- Length: 2.60 mi (4.18 km)
- Location: Richmond County, New York
- North end: Lily Pond Avenue
- South end: Miller Field

Father Capodanno Boulevard, formerly Seaside Boulevard, is the primary north-south artery that runs through the Arrochar, South Beach, Ocean Breeze, Midland Beach, and New Dorp Beach neighborhoods of the New York City borough of Staten Island. The boulevard runs parallel to the South Beach Boardwalk and its public park.

== History ==
Father Capodanno Boulevard was originally conceived by New York City parks commissioner Robert Moses as the northernmost stretch of a planned limited-access highway to be named Shore Front Drive. The road was built in 1955–1958 as Seaside Boulevard as part of an improvement to the boardwalk. The first section of the boulevard opened in 1957. The name was changed in 1976 to honor Vincent R. Capodanno, a local Roman Catholic chaplain and priest who was killed in the Vietnam War in 1967.

== Description ==
The road exists today as the primary boulevard for the communities and public parks of Staten Island's East Shore. The road currently consists of six vehicular lanes: four driving lanes, a parking lane with turning bays southbound and a bus lane northbound. Previously existing bicycle lanes were removed in 2010 "without any discernible public process". Northbound and southbound traffic is divided by a grassy center median. To avoid Hylan Boulevard's traffic congestion, Father Capodanno Boulevard is also used as a "short cut" to the Verrazzano–Narrows Bridge by residents of the island's more inland and southern communities.

The entire boulevard suffered extensive damage and flooding during Hurricane Sandy in October 2012. The East Shore Seawall will roughly parallel the road.

== Transportation ==
Father Capodanno Boulevard is covered by the S51/S81 local buses north of Midland Avenue, as do the SIM5, SIM6, SIM9 express routes to and from Manhattan. The S52 serves it between Seaview Avenue and Sand Lane.

== Major intersections ==
Major intersections include:

- Lily Pond Avenue (northern end)
- Sand Lane
- Seaview Avenue
- Slater Boulevard
- Hunter Avenue
- Midland Avenue
- Lincoln Avenue
- Greeley Avenue
