= Vincent R. Capodanno =

United States Navy Medal of Honor recipient (1929–1967)

Servant of God Vincent R. Capodanno M.M.
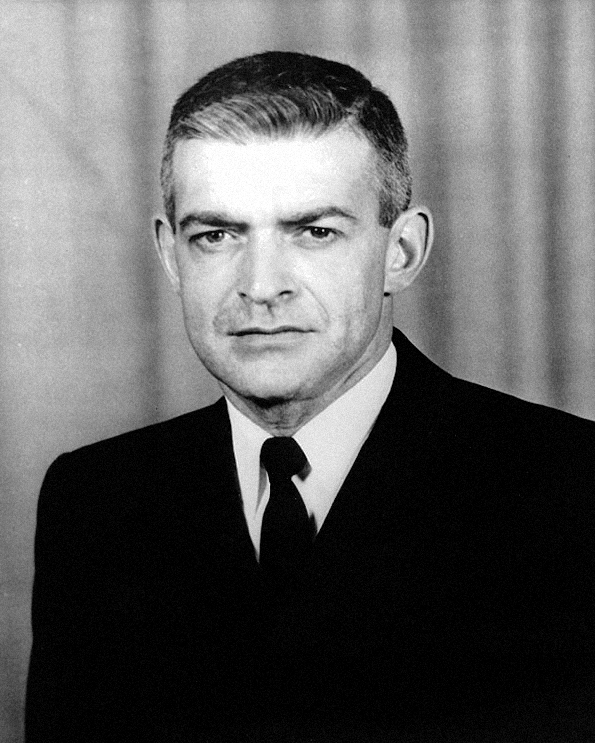
- Born: February 13, 1929; Staten Island, New York, U.S.
- Died: September 4, 1967 (aged 38); Thăng Bình District, Quang Tin Province, South Vietnam
- Burial place: St. Peter's Cemetery, West New Brighton, Staten Island, New York
- Military career
- Allegiance: United States of America
- Branch: United States Navy Reserve
- Service years: 1965–1967
- Rank: Lieutenant
- Nickname: "The Grunt Padre"
- Units: Navy Chaplain Corps; 3rd Battalion, 5th Marines, 1st Marine Division
- Conflicts: Vietnam War: Operation Swift †
- Awards: Medal of Honor; Bronze Star Medal w/ Combat "V"; Purple Heart Medal; Combat Action Ribbon; Republic of Vietnam Gallantry Cross w/ silver star

Vincent Robert Capodanno Jr., M.M. (February 13, 1929 – September 4, 1967) was an American Catholic priest and Maryknoll Missioner killed in action while serving as a Navy chaplain with a Marine Corps infantry unit during the Vietnam War. He was a posthumous recipient of America's highest military decoration, the Medal of Honor, for heroic actions above and beyond the call of duty. As a beatification process has been opened for Capodanno, the Catholic Church has titled him a Servant of God.

== Biography ==
=== Early life and missionary work ===
Vincent R. Capodanno Jr. was born in Elm Park, Staten Island, on February 13, 1929, the tenth and youngest child of an immigrant father from Gaeta, Italy, and an Italian-American mother. Capodanno graduated from Curtis High School on February 4, 1947, then took night classes at Fordham University for a year while working as an insurance clerk. In 1949, he entered the Maryknoll Missionary Seminary in Ossining, New York, which included extensive studies in Illinois and Massachusetts. He was ordained a Roman Catholic priest by Cardinal Francis Spellman on June 14, 1958.

Capodanno's first assignment as a missionary was in 1959 with the Hakka people in the mountains of Taiwan, where he served in a parish and later in a school. After six years, he returned to the United States for leave and was assigned to a Maryknoll school in Hong Kong. Shortly after, he volunteered to serve as a military chaplain in South Vietnam as the American presence escalated.

=== Military service ===
On December 28, 1965, Capodanno received his commission as a lieutenant in the Navy Chaplain Corps. He then requested to serve with the Fleet Marine Force (FMF) in South Vietnam. After some training to serve within the Marine Corps, he was assigned in April 1966 to the 1st Battalion, 7th Marines, 1st Marine Division in South Vietnam. In December, he was transferred to the 1st Medical Battalion, 1st Marine Division, until his year's tour was completed. In June 1967 after a one-month leave, he returned to Vietnam for a voluntary six-month extension, and in July was assigned to the 1st Battalion, 5th Marines. In August, he was assigned to H&S Company, 3rd Battalion, 5th Marines, 1st Marine Division, where he befriended Lieutenant Frederick W. Smith, the future founder of FedEx. Even before Capodanno's death, he was widely known for his willingness to share the hardships of suffering Marines on the front lines – "Radiating Christ" to those around him, in the terminology of Father Raoul Plus, a World War One chaplain studied by Maryknollers – or simply the "Grunt Padre", in the words of Capodanno's Marine companions.

On Labor Day, September 4, 1967, at 04:30, during Operation Swift in the Thang Binh District of the Que Son Valley, Company D, 1st Battalion, 5th Marines was attacked in its night defensive position by a large People's Army of Vietnam (PAVN) unit of approximately 2,500 near the village of Dong Son. The outnumbered and disorganized company needed support, and Company B was sent to assist. By 09:14, 26 Marines were confirmed dead. At 09:25, the commander of the 1st Battalion requested additional reinforcements, and Companies K and M from 3rd Battalion were committed to the battle, still leaving the Marines greatly outnumbered by the PAVN.

When Capodanno heard that two platoons of M Company from his battalion were taking casualties and about to be overrun by the PAVN, the unarmed chaplain went among the wounded and dying Marines of 2nd Platoon, helping and comforting them and giving last rites. That afternoon, he was wounded in the hand, arms and legs. Refusing medical evacuation, in the early evening, he went to help a seriously wounded Navy corpsman and two wounded Marines only yards (meters) from an enemy machine gun and was killed; 14 Marines and two corpsmen from the battalion were also killed. His body was recovered and buried in his family's plot in St. Peter's Cemetery (Staten Island).

On December 27, 1968, Secretary of the Navy Paul Ignatius notified the Capodanno family that he would posthumously be awarded the Medal of Honor. The ceremony was held on January 7, 1969.

== Canonization process ==
On May 19, 2002, Capodanno's canonization process was opened. In May 2004, the initial documentation was submitted to the Congregation for the Causes of Saints, with CatholicMil (later renamed Mission Capodanno) acting as Petitioner and with Capodanno's biographer Daniel Mode named postulator. On Memorial Day weekend, May 21, 2006, Capodanno's designation as a Servant of God was announced in Washington D.C., by Archbishop Edwin F. O'Brien of the Archdiocese for the Military Services, USA. On October 1, 2013, O'Brien's successor, Archbishop Timothy P. Broglio, presided over the formal renewal of the opening of the cause for beatification. Broglio announced at this time that the newly established Capodanno Guild would serve as the Petitioner of the Cause and Andrea Ambrosi as Roman Postulator. Following a year-long investigation, Bishop Gerald Barbarito in 2019 officially credited Capodanno with the miraculous healing of a Florida woman with multiple sclerosis.

In 2017, for the 50th anniversary of Capodanno's death, EWTN collaborated with the Capodanno Guild to produce Called and Chosen, a documentary film publicizing his life and the ongoing effort. The film won the Catholic Press Association's 2018 Gabriel Award for Best Religious TV, National Release. Focusing on his missionary vocation, another documentary premiered in 2019, The Field Afar: The Life of Father Vincent Capodanno. Much of the Guild's documentation was presented in the 2018 biography, "Armed with Faith: The Life of Father Vincent R. Capodanno, MM".

In 2022, a Vatican advisory panel recommended suspending the sainthood cause, evidently concerned that Capodanno's heroism reflected the battlefield more than religion and that his cause was being led by the American military more than the Maryknoll religious order. Questions were also raised concerning Capodanno's obedience to his religious superiors. The Capodanno Guild and the current postulator Nicola Gori began working to overcome the objections, and the Guild's chairman reported that Archbishop Broglio was appointing a three-member historical commission to document Capodanno's pre-military life and spirituality in greater detail. The commission submitted their report in May 2024. It was reported in April 2026 that the Military Archdiocese expected a decision from the Dicastery in May 2026.

== Military awards ==
Father Capodanno's awards and decorations include:

Medal of Honor		Bronze Star Medal w/ Combat "V"
Purple Heart Medal	Combat Action Ribbon	Navy Presidential Unit Citation
National Defense Service Medal	Vietnam Service Medal with FMF Combat Operations Insignia and three 3/16" bronze service stars	Vietnam Gallantry Cross with silver star
Vietnam Gallantry Cross Unit Citation	Vietnam Civil Actions Medal Unit Citation	Republic of Vietnam Campaign Medal w/ 1960- device

=== Medal of Honor citation ===
Awarded January 7, 1969, Father Capodanno's Medal of Honor citation is as follows:

The President of the United States in the name of The Congress takes pride in presenting the MEDAL OF HONOR posthumously to

LIEUTENANT VINCENT R. CAPODANNO
CHAPLAIN CORPS
UNITED STATES NAVAL RESERVE

for service as set forth in the following

CITATION:

For conspicuous gallantry and intrepidity at the risk of his life above and beyond the call of duty as Chaplain of the 3d Battalion, 5th Marines, 1st Marine Division (Reinforced), FMF, in connection with operations against enemy forces in Quang Tin Province, Republic of Vietnam, on 4 September 1967. In response to reports that the 2d Platoon of M Company was in danger of being overrun by a massed enemy assaulting force, Lieutenant Capodanno left the relative safety of the Company Command Post and ran through an open area raked with fire, directly to the beleaguered platoon. Disregarding the intense enemy small-arms, automatic-weapons, and mortar fire, he moved about the battlefield administering last rites to the dying and giving medical aid to the wounded. When an exploding mortar round inflicted painful multiple wounds to his arms and legs, and severed a portion of his right hand, he steadfastly refused all medical aid. Instead, he directed the corpsmen to help their wounded comrades and, with calm vigor, continued to move about the battlefield as he provided encouragement by voice and example to the valiant Marines. Upon encountering a wounded corpsman in the direct line of fire of an enemy machine gunner positioned approximately fifteen yards away, Lieutenant Capodanno rushed forward in a daring attempt to aid and assist the mortally wounded corpsman. At that instant, only inches from his goal, he was struck down by a burst of machine gun fire. By his heroic conduct on the battlefield, and his inspiring example, Lieutenant Capodanno upheld the finest traditions of the United States Naval Service. He gallantly gave his life in the cause of freedom.

/S/ LYNDON B. JOHNSON

== Honors and namings ==
=== USS Capodanno ===
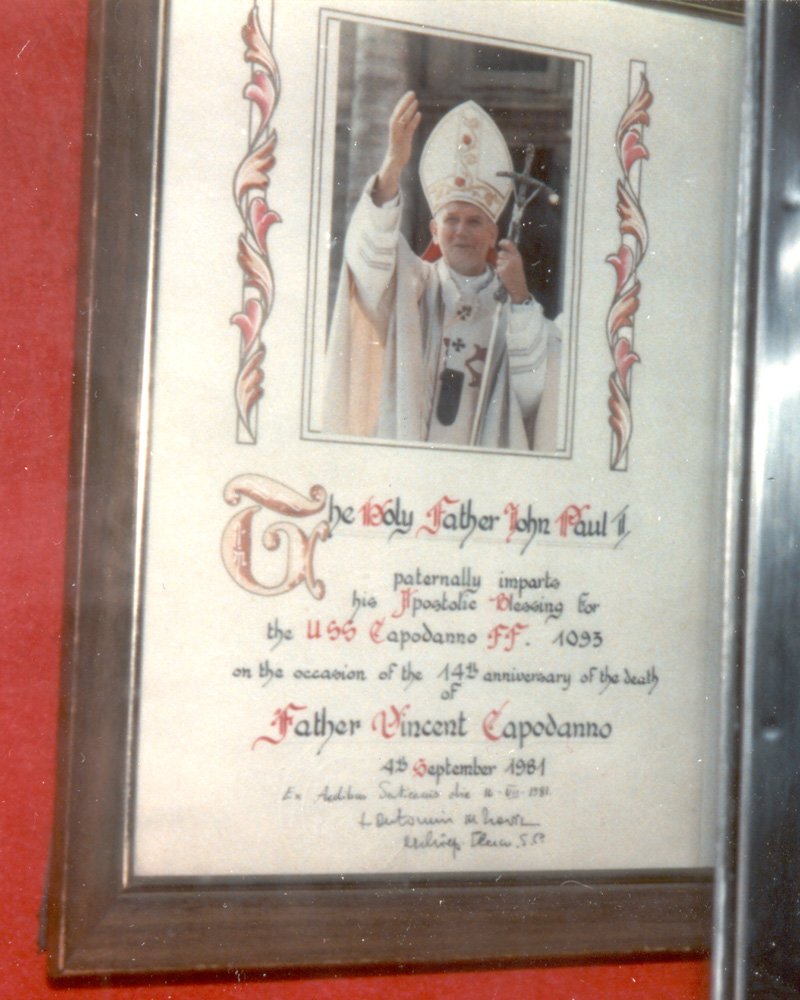
Certificate of Papal Blessing

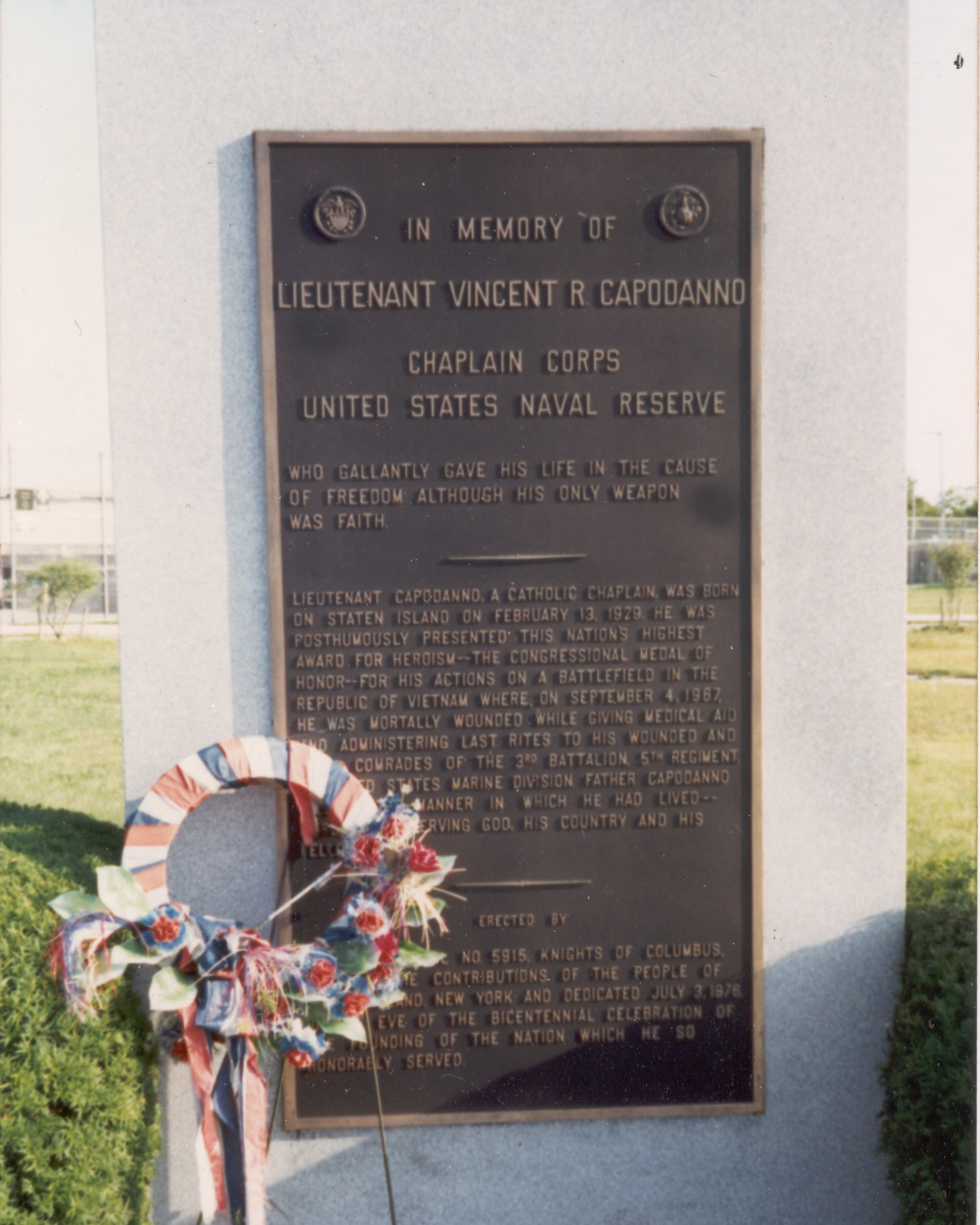
Memorial to Father Vincent Capodanno, along his namesake boulevard in Staten Island, New York

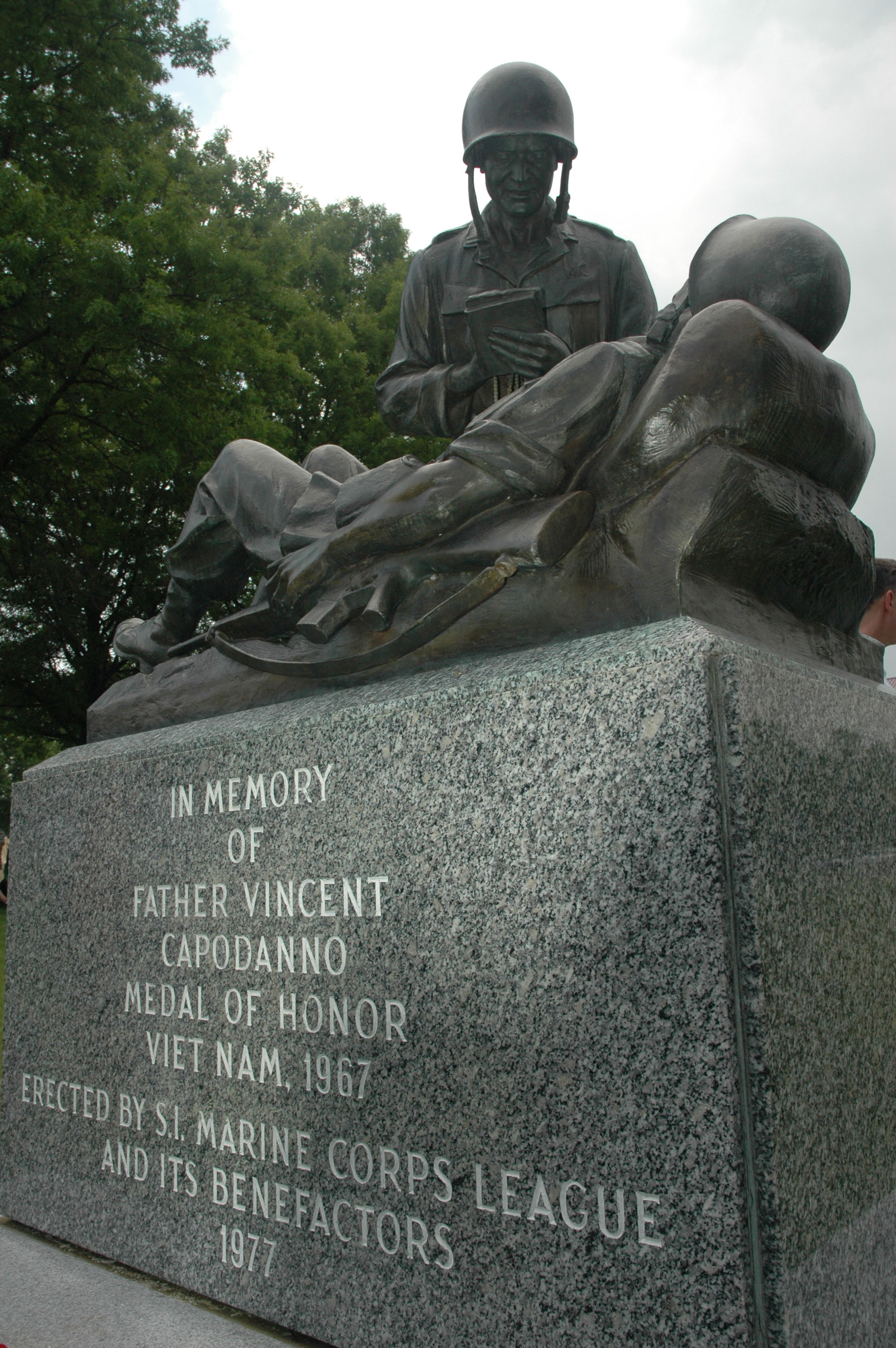
Another memorial to Father Vincent Capodanno, Fort Wadsworth, New York

USS Capodanno (FF-1093) was named in his honor. Capodanno was commissioned November 17, 1973, and became the first ship in the US fleet to receive a Papal Blessing when it was blessed by Pope John Paul II on September 4, 1981, the 14th anniversary of the chaplain's death. On July 30, 1993, the ship was decommissioned after 20 years of service and transferred to Turkey.

=== New York City honors ===
In March 1971, the Knights of Columbus, Madonna Council in Staten Island began a public campaign for a permanent memorial honoring Capodanno in his home borough. In October 1974, a bill was proposed to change the name of Seaside Boulevard to Father Capodanno Boulevard; a year later, the bill was passed by the Mayor of New York. For the United States Bicentennial weekend, the city of New York declared July 3, 1976, "Father Capodanno Day", and a memorial Mass was followed by a parade that included the United States Marine Corps Color Guard, marching bands, Boy and Girl Scouts, and many other groups.

Near the midpoint of Staten Island's Father Capodanno Boulevard, at the corner of Sand Lane, a monument in the chaplain's honor is made of light gray Barre granite, stands 8' high and 4' wide (2.4m x 1.2m) and has a bronze plaque. Near the north end of the boulevard, alongside Fort Wadsworth's Father Capodanno Memorial Chapel, stands a 1977 statue of the chaplain praying for a fallen corpsman during their final battle. The nearby South Beach neighborhood is the location of Father Vincent Capodanno Catholic Academy, formed by the merger of two parish elementary schools in 2020.

=== Saint Vincent Chapel, Taiwan ===
Saint Vincent Chapel, in Father Capodanno's Taiwanese mission territory, was his family's first choice as a memorial. Within four months after his death in 1967, almost $4,000 (equivalent to $40,000 in 2025) had been raised by organizations such as The American Legion, The Veterans of Foreign Wars, the Knights of Columbus, and the Marine Corps League. After various delays, the chapel was completed in 1993–1995. It was built in the small mountain town of Thiankou with the help of Father Daniel Dolan, another Maryknoller and Capodanno's former pastor in Taiwan.

=== Capodanno Hall, San Francisco ===
The San Francisco Bay Naval Shipyard (Hunters Point, 1941–1994) dedicated Capodanno Hall on November 3, 1969. The hall served as a Bachelor Officers' Quarters. Philip Capodanno unveiled the plaque that describes his brother's heroic deed:

Lieutenant Capodanno made the ultimate sacrifice ministering to the wounded and dying during savage fighting in Vietnam. He has become the third chaplain in our country's history to receive the Medal of Honor and the second Navy chaplain to be so honored.

=== Other physical memorials ===
Further memorials to Father Capodanno were noted in his published biography:

- Capodanno Chapel, Que Son Valley, Vietnam
- Capodanno Memorial Chapel, Naval Station Newport, Rhode Island
- Capodanno Drive, Naval Station Newport, Rhode Island
- Capodanno Chapel, Naval Hospital, Oakland, California
- Capodanno Chapel, Camp Pendleton, California
- Vincent Robert Capodanno Naval Clinic, Gaeta, Italy
- Piazza Vincent Capodanno, Gaeta, Italy
- Capodanno Building, Navy Personnel Command, Millington, Tennessee
- Capodanno Chapel, Marine Corps Air Station, Iwakuni, Japan
- Catholic Chaplains Memorial, Arlington National Cemetery, Arlington, Virginia

Additional locations have been:

- Capodanno Chapel, The Basic School, Marine Corps Base Quantico, Virginia
- Capodanno Memorial Chapel, Al-Taqaddum (TQ) Air Base, Iraq
- Vincent R. Capodanno Memorial, National Shrine of Our Lady of Good Help, Champion, Wisconsin
- Father Vincent Capodanno High School, Southern Pines, North Carolina
- Capodanno Chapel, USS Mount Whitney (LCC-20)
- St. Catherine of Sienna Church, Franklin Square, New York (stained glass)

== See also ==
- List of American saints and beatified people
- List of Chaplain Corps Medal of Honor recipients
- List of Medal of Honor recipients for the Vietnam War
- List of Servants of God
- Roman Catholic Archdiocese for the Military Services, USA
- Roman Catholic Archdiocese of New York
- United States Navy Memorial#Other Navy memorials

== Further references ==
- The Grunt Padre in Vietnam (DVD). Focus Worldwide Network. 2004. ASIN B002Y16MA0.
- Glass, Doyle D. (2014). Swift Sword: The Marines of Mike 3/5. Coleche Press. ISBN 978-0-692217-04-7.
