= Shore Acres, Staten Island =

Neighborhood in New York City

Coordinates: 40°36′35″N 74°04′00″W

Shore Acres is a small neighborhood of Staten Island, one of the five boroughs of New York City. It is situated along the Upper New York Bay, just north of Fort Wadsworth and south of Rosebank. Shore Acres is generally considered to be bounded by Bay Street on the west, the Upper New York Bay on the east, Nautilus Street on the north, and Arthur Von Briesen Park on the south.

== History ==
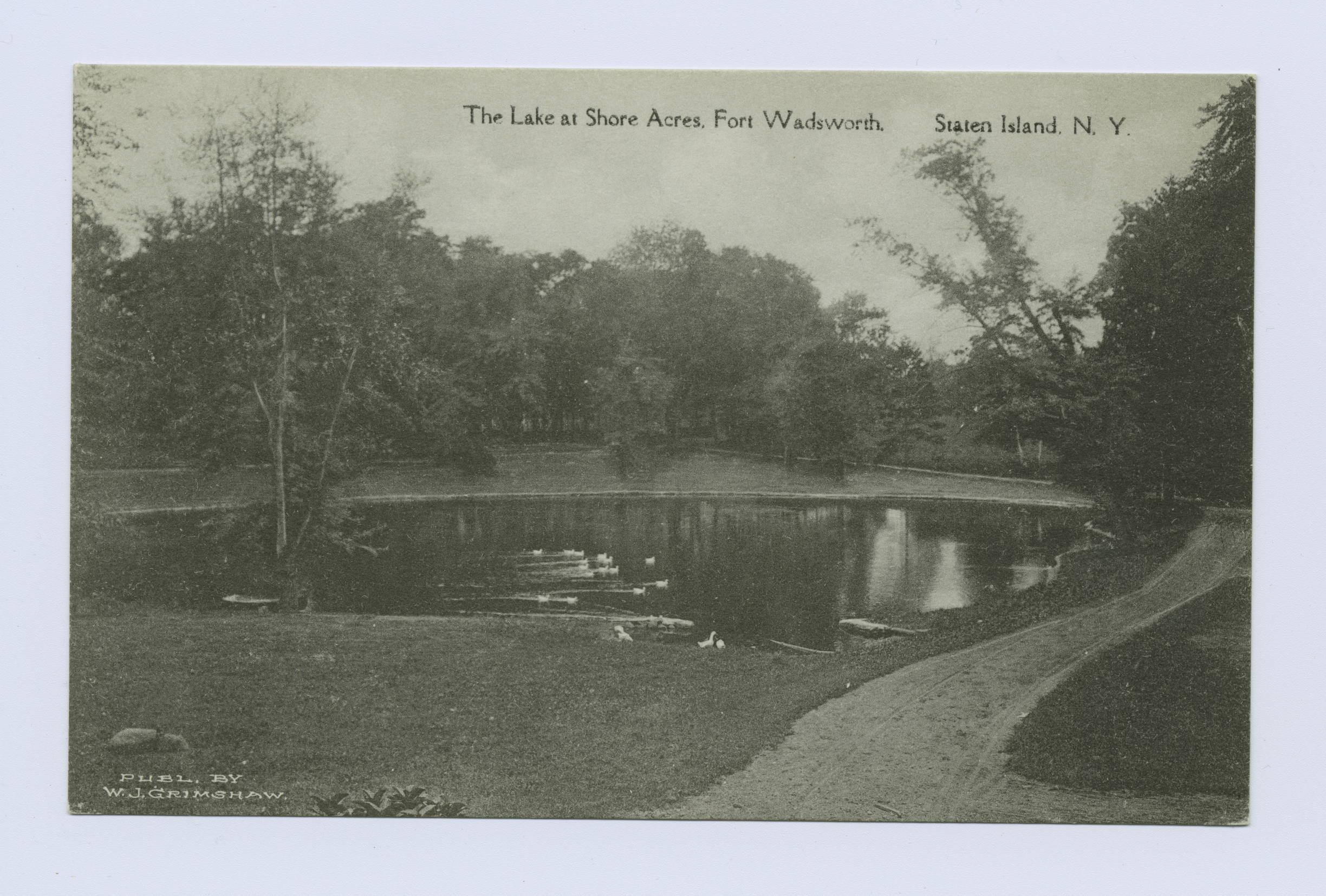
The lake at Shore Acres, early 20th century

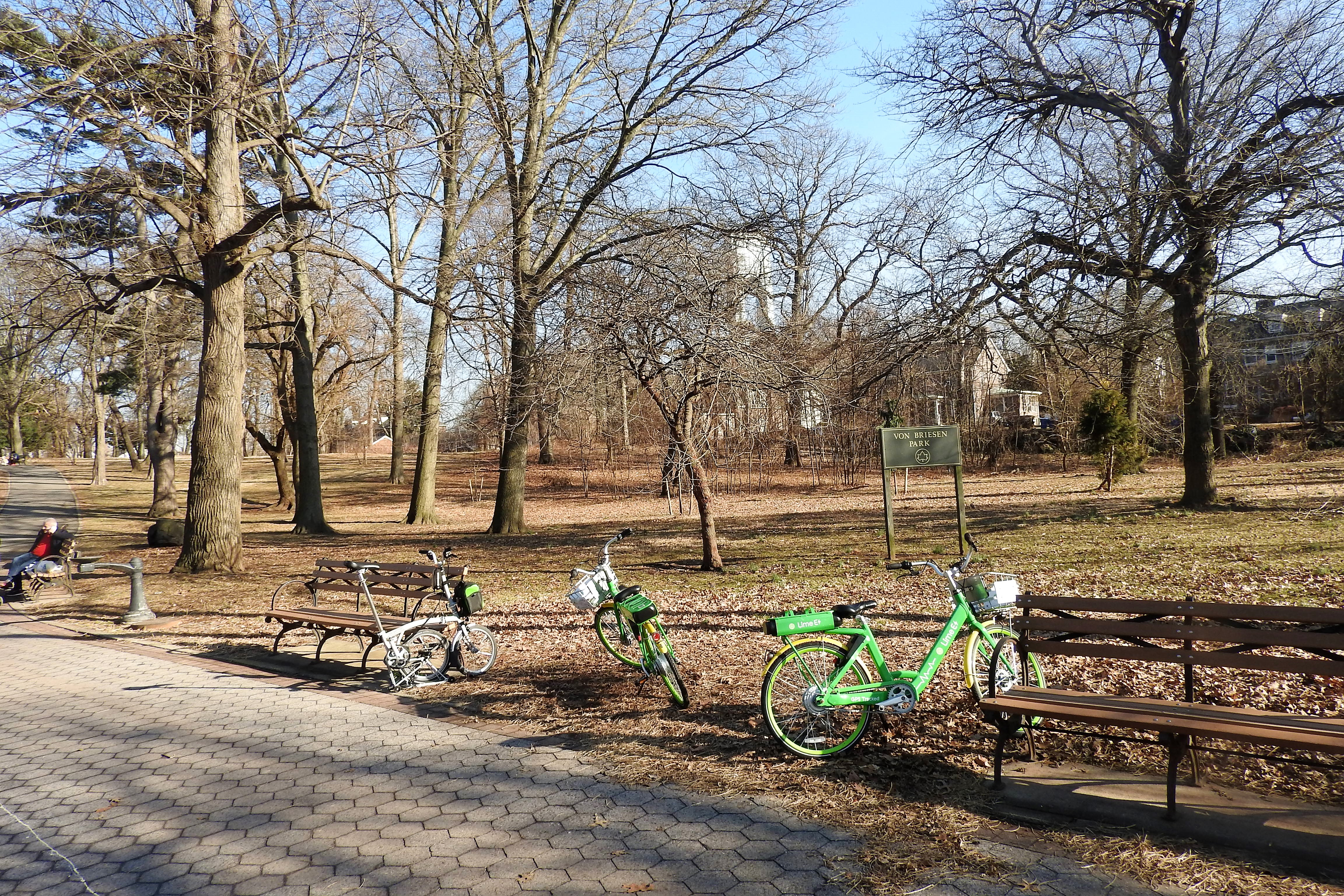
Arthur von Briesen Park

The name originally referred to an enclave of upscale homes that were built in the vicinity in the 1930s by Cornelius G. Kolff, a prominent real estate developer and one-time President of the Staten Island Chamber of Commerce. Soon after the homes were built, the name "Shore Acres" began to be applied to the locality itself.

== Features ==
Shore Acres is distinctive for its secluded atmosphere, in large part provided by abundant shade trees. Along with Randall Manor, it is one of the few upper-class neighborhoods on Staten Island not situated in the series of highlands that begin with Ward Hill in the north and stretch to Lighthouse Hill in the south.

== Transportation ==
Only two bus routes serve Shore Acres: the S51 and S81. They run on Bay Street to St. George Terminal.
