= Vision 2020: New York City Comprehensive Waterfront Plan =

Initiative to develop the waterfront of New York City

The Vision 2020: New York City Comprehensive Waterfront Plan was introduced in March 2011 by Mayor Michael R. Bloomberg, City Council Speaker Christine C. Quinn, and the Director of the New York City Department of City Planning, Amanda Burden, this plan provides a framework for the next ten years of waterfront development in New York City. The plan has two components: a three-year action agenda comprising 130 funded projects, including the development of more than 50 acres (20 ha) of new waterfront parks, creation of 14 new waterfront esplanades, and introduction of new commuter ferry service (NYC Ferry), providing a framework for the City’s 520 miles (840 km) of shoreline for the next decade and beyond.

== History ==
New York City, like many other cities, is experiencing a vast redevelopment of its waterfronts from primarily maritime activities and water dependent uses to parks, housing and economic development activities and expanding the use on the waterways for transportation, recreation and natural habitats. This transformation is due in great part to containerization, which reshaped the shipping industry and required the use of vast, concentrated expanses of waterfront and upland areas. This condensed the Port of New York and New Jersey shipping industry to six locations within the harbor and left many waterfront areas and piers vacant. These six terminals include:

- Red Hook Container Terminal, Brooklyn
- New York Container Terminal, Staten Island
- Port Newark Container Terminal, Newark
- Global Marine Terminal, Jersey City
- Maher Terminal, Elizabeth
- APM Terminals, Elizabeth

The abandoned waterfront areas and maritime infrastructure suffered from years of neglect and in 1992, the first Comprehensive Waterfront Plan was introduced by the New York City Department of City Planning. The 1992 plan recommended regulatory changes, such as specific rezonings to appropriately zone the waterfront based on actual land use patterns. As part of the 1992 Comprehensive Waterfront Plan, the City Zoning Resolution was revised in 1993 to define waterfront properties and to list special regulations for these areas.

In order to help preserve the maritime industry and water dependent industry uses that still exist, the Plan also designates 6 areas as Significant Maritime Industrial Areas (SMIA). These districts were previously zoned for heavy manufacturing and will continue to be used for industry. The designated SMIA’s include:

- Kill Van Kull between Staten Island and Bayonne
- Sunset Park in Brooklyn
- Red Hook in Brooklyn
- Brooklyn Navy Yard in Brooklyn
- Newtown Creek in Brooklyn and Queens
- South Bronx in the Bronx

== Goals ==
The updated Comprehensive Waterfront Plan has identified the following eight goals:

- Goal 1: Expand public access to the waterfront and waterways on public and private property for all New Yorkers and visitors alike.
- Goal 2: Enliven the waterfront with a range of attractive uses integrated with adjacent upland communities.
- Goal 3: Support the working waterfront: Support economic development activity on the working waterfront.
- Goal 4: Improve water quality through measurements that benefit natural habitats, support public recreation, and enhance waterfront and upland communities.
- Goal 5: Restore the natural waterfront: Restore degraded natural waterfront areas, and protect wetlands and shorefront habitats.
- Goal 6: Enhance the "Blue Network": Enhance the public experience of the waterways that surround New York – our "Blue Network".
- Goal 7: Improve government oversight: Improve governmental regulation, coordination, and oversight of the waterfront and waterways.
- Goal 8: Increase climate resilience: Identify and pursue strategies to increase the city’s resilience to climate change and sea level rise.

Due to the diversity of the 520 linear miles of the waterfront, the Plan divides the City into 22 different reaches based on ecological and geographical considerations. Each reach is assigned a specific strategy in order to achieve the 8 goals of the Plan.

The plan recently won the American Planning Association’s National Planning Excellence Award 2012: The Daniel Burnham Award for a Comprehensive Plan.
