= S51 and S81 buses =

Bus routes in Staten Island, New York

s51 s81
- Bay Street/Father Capodanno Boulevard Buses
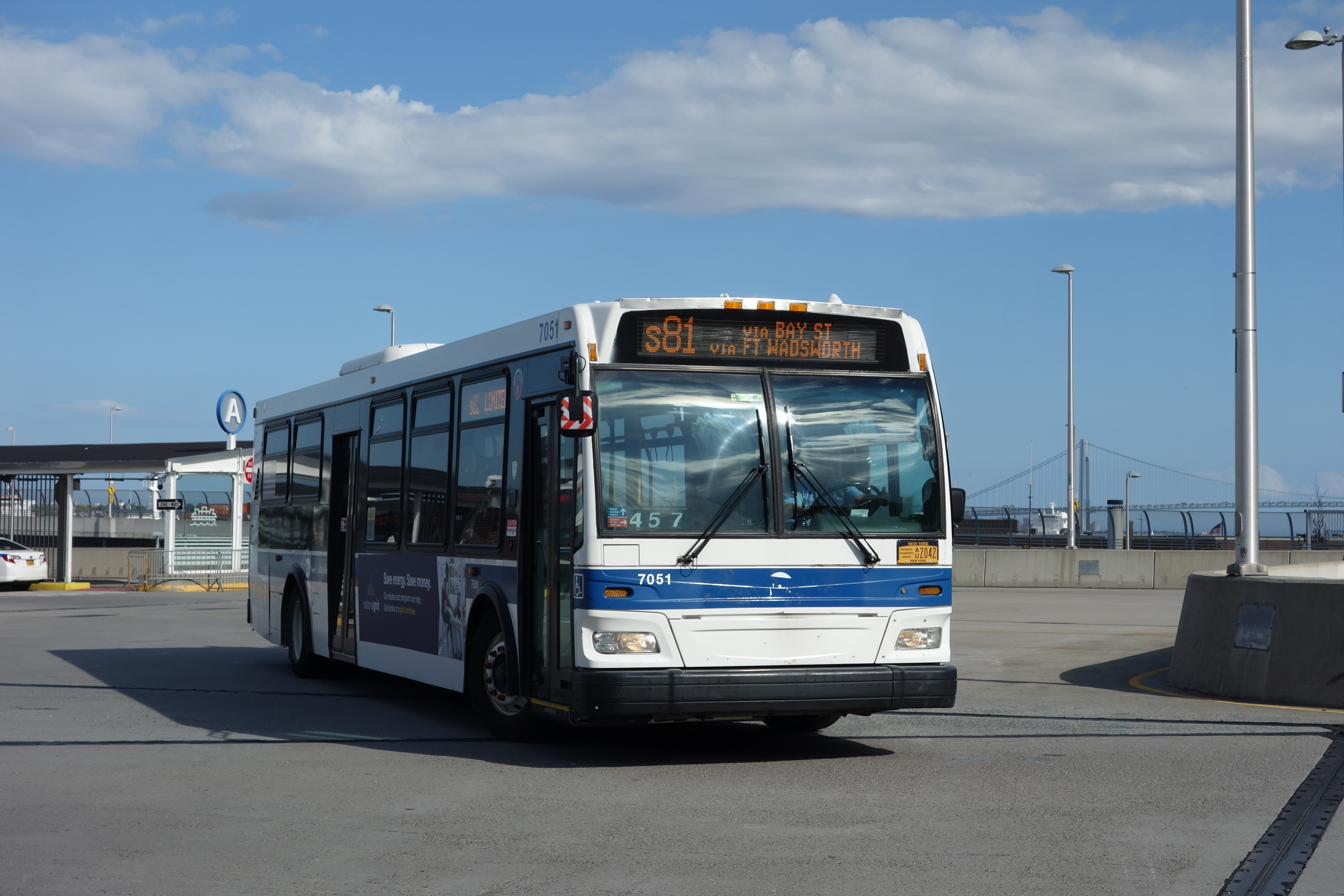
- A 2011 Orion VII 3G (7051) on the S81 departs St. George Ferry Terminal for Grant City

Overview
- System: MTA Regional Bus Operations
- Operator: New York City Transit Authority
- Garage: Castleton Depot
- Vehicle: Orion VII EPA10; Nova Bus LFS
- Began service: April 15, 1990 (S51); 2001 (S81)

Route
- Locale: Staten Island, New York, U.S.
- Communities served: St. George, Tompkinsville, Stapleton, Clifton, Rosebank, Shore Acres, Fort Wadsworth, Arrochar, South Beach, Midland Beach, Grant City
- Start: St. George Ferry Terminal
- Via: Bay Street, Father Capodanno Boulevard, Midland Avenue, Lincoln Avenue (Grant City– bound)
- End: Grant City – Lincoln Avenue and Richmond Road
- Length: 7.5 miles (12.1 km) (S51); 7.7 miles (12.4 km) (S51 Ft Wadsworth Branch/S81)
- Other routes: S52 Jersey St/Tompkins Av

Service
- Operates: 24 hours (S51); PM rush hours (S81)
- Annual patronage: 565,069 (2025)
- Transfers: Yes
- Timetable: S51/S81

The S51 and S81 constitute bus routes in Staten Island, New York running primarily on Bay Street, Father Capodanno Boulevard, and Midland Avenue, between St. George Ferry Terminal and Grant City.

The S51 was originally a streetcar route, that was replaced with buses in 1934. The S81 was created in 2001 as a limited-stop version of the S51.

== Route description ==
The S51 begins at St. George Ferry Terminal Ramp B, and continues along Bay Street until it turns to School Road then Lily Pond Avenue to access Father Capodanno Boulevard. It then continues on the boulevard until it turns to Midland Avenue, then uses Hylan Boulevard and Lincoln Avenue to access the terminus, while buses heading northbound use Richmond Road to access Midland Avenue. Some AM rush trips and all PM rush trips start/end at South Beach in the peak direction. Some buses via Fort Wadsworth use New York Avenue and Battery Road instead of School Road and Lily Pond Avenue, and runs 7 days a week. During rush hours, the S81 replicates the S51, but runs via Fort Wadsworth. It heads to Grant City during PM hours only. It also makes all local stops south of Sand Lane and Father Capodanno Boulevard.

=== School trippers ===
When school is in session, an extra S51 trip to St. George originates at Hylan Boulevard at 2pm.

== History ==
The S51 bus was originally the route 2 streetcar, which ran between St. George Ferry Terminal and Shore Acres, and was operated by Staten Island Electric Railway, Richmond Light and Railroad Company, and finally Richmond Railways. On January 7, 1934, buses replaced streetcars, and was initially operated by Staten Island Coach Company, then the Isle Transportation Company, as route R2.

In 1947, Isle Transportation went bankrupt, and was taken over by the New York City Board of Transportation on February 23 of the same year.

The R2MB became the S2, and then the S51 on April 15, 1990.

On the R2MB Summer Service, certain trips were terminated and originated at Midland Beach Bus Loop (Jefferson Avenue & Seaside (now Father Capodanno) Boulevard).

Service from Midnight to 5 a.m. was terminated at Midland Avenue and Kiswick Street.

The R2SB was discontinued; the Arrochar segment merged into the S104 (now the S52).

In January 1990, alternate buses began running through Fort Wadsworth between 6 a.m. and 9 p.m.. Around January 12, 1991, the grounds of the United States Naval Station at the Fort were closed to the public due to security concerns due to the beginning of the Gulf War. The restriction became permanent after the war. On March 27, 1995, alternate S51 buses during weekday rush hours in the off-peak direction, from St. George between 6 a.m. and 9 a.m. and from Grant City between 3 and 5:30 p.m. They began running through Fort Wadsworth at the request of the Defense Logistics Agency, which moved several employees to the Fort from Manhattan. Other alternatives considered included diverting all S51 service between 6 a.m.. and 7 p.m. and diverting the S53 and reverse peak-direction express bus trips. In June 1995, alternate S51 buses in the peak direction during the peak hour was rerouted into Fort Wadsworth.

In July 2001, the MTA announced plans to start the S81 service as an evening rush hour, peak-direction limited-stop variant of the S51 in fall 2001, replacing selected S51 local trips. S81 service would operate southbound on weekdays between 4:30 p.m. and 6:30 p.m.. During this time period, two S51 buses were scheduled within three minutes of each other to meet each ferry trip to accommodate passenger volumes from each boat. Since the S81 would help 45 percent of evening peak period, peak direction riders south of Sand Lane by saving five minutes of travel time, the pair of buses would be more evenly loaded. The S81 would make all local stops south of Father Capodanno Boulevard and Sand Lane, and the route would serve Fort Wadsworth. S81 limited-stop service was not implemented in the AM rush hour since limited-stop service was only implemented when a route had service running at least every five minutes, and service on the S51 in the morning rush hour ran every six to eight minutes. The MTA announced plans in April 2002 to implement service at Fort Wadsworth during off-hours with the change in Fort Wadsworth from a naval base to a facility that also included the Gateway National Recreational Area. With the change, alternate S51 trips would run to Fort Wadsworth between 6 a.m. and 7 p.m. The change took effect on June 30, 2002.

On September 12, 2004, S51 service began operating to Grant City at all times, with an extension of late night service from Midland Beach. On April 7, 2008, two more S81 trips were added, leaving St. George at 6:15 and 6:30 p.m.
