= Land reclamation in Lower Manhattan =

Landfilling of Lower Manhattan, NYC

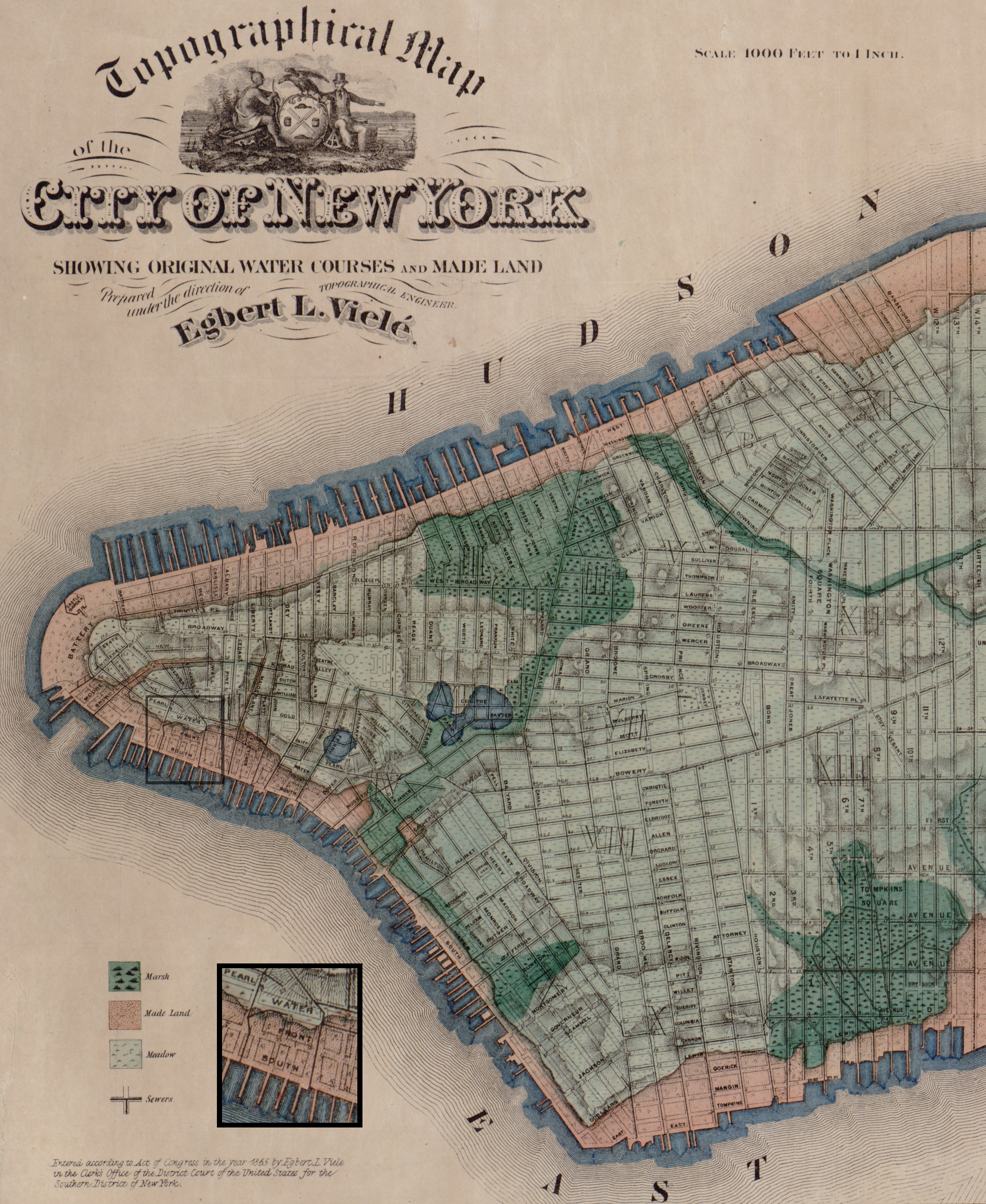
An 1865 map of Lower Manhattan below 14th Street showing land reclamation along the shoreline.

The expansion of the land area of Lower Manhattan in New York City by land reclamation has, over time, greatly altered Manhattan Island's shorelines on the Hudson and East rivers and Upper New York Bay. Incremental encroachment, landfill, as well as major infrastructure have added acreage to the island. Since the passage of the Rivers and Harbors Act of 1899 all projects which extend into navigable waterways follow federal regulation and are overseen by the United States Army Corps of Engineers.

Shoreline circa 1600, based on the Viele Map published in 1865

The original shoreline on the East Side generally ran along contemporary Pearl and Cherry streets and on the West Side was roughly today's Greenwich Street. Encroachment began in the 17th-century Dutch settlement of New Amsterdam. The real estate law mechanism of water lots encouraged commercial land growth through the Dongan Charter of 1686 and the Montgomerie Charter of 1731. By the 19th century 137 acres (55 ha) of land had been created by landfill, the disposal of waste. By the early 20th century the expansion had obliterated the extensive oyster beds which once covered much of the estuary floor. It is estimated that by the 1970s, 1,400 to 2,225 acres (567 to 900 ha) of the entire Manhattan landmass, has been created by reclamation. Another estimate is that 3,000 acres (1,200 ha), or 29% of the entire land area, had been created by reclamation.

In the 21st century, largely in response to Hurricane Sandy (2012) and to a lesser degree Hurricane Ida (2021), projects along the shoreline have been proposed as part of climate change adaptation to mitigate the effects to Manhattan Island by improved resilience. Lower Manhattan Coastal Resiliency programs, which involve fortifying and extending the shoreline, are being implemented.

Proposals for expansion, including encompassing Governors Island and other smaller islands, have circulated since the early 20th century.

== The Battery ==
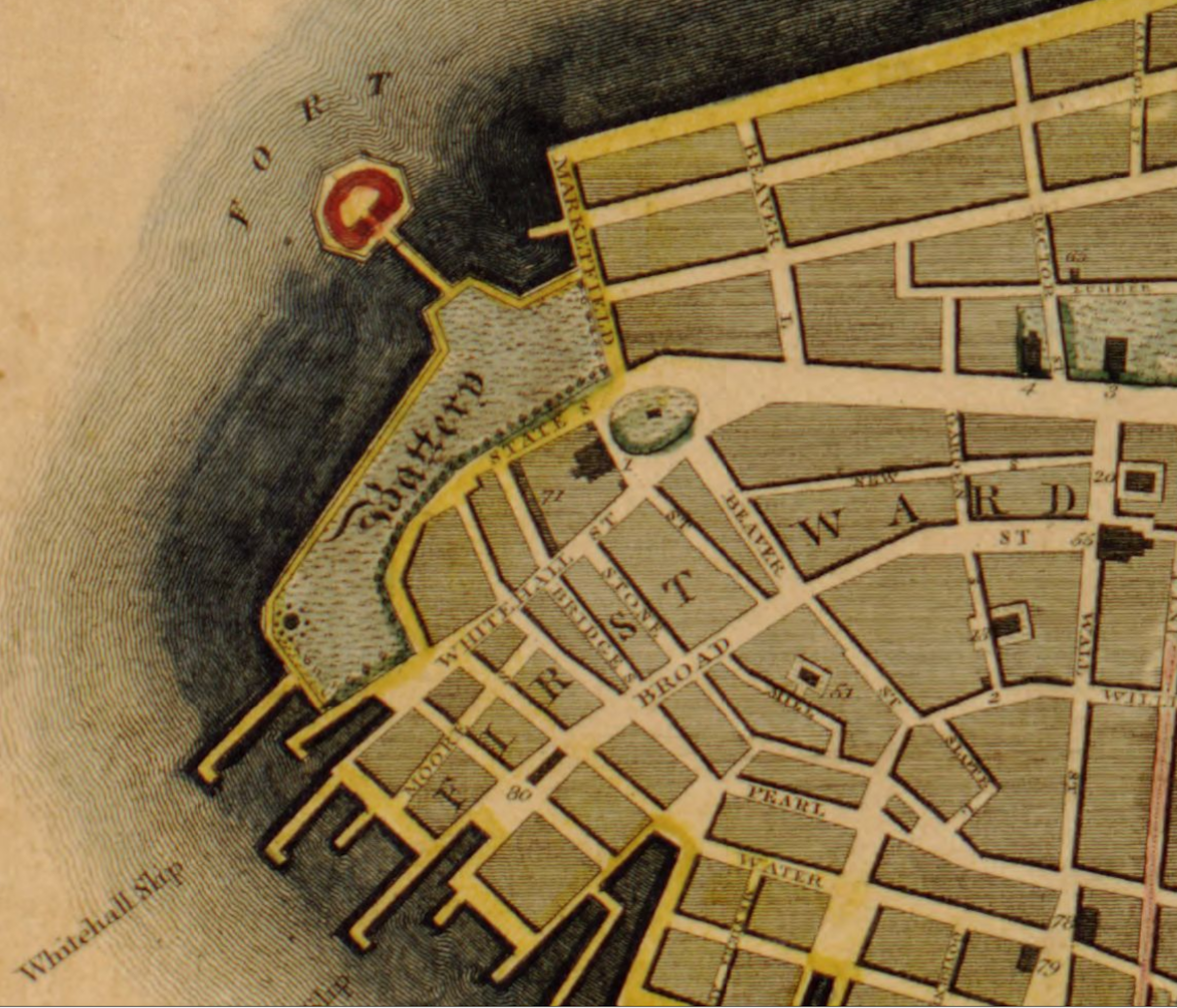
Castle Clinton in 1811 from Map of the city of New York and island of Manhattan

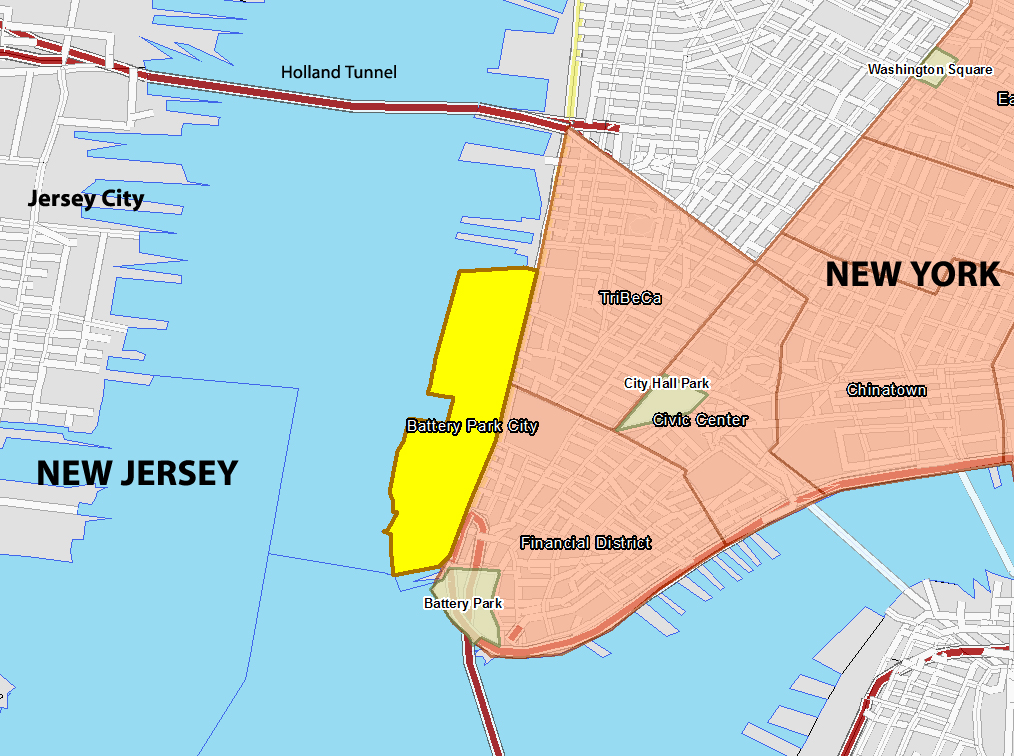
The Battery (1820s–1850s) and Battery Park City (1970s) extended into the Hudson River

The Battery, also called Battery Park, is located on southern Manhattan at the mouth of the Hudson River.

In the early 1600s, this area is recognized and colonized by the Dutch. The Dutch built forts including Fort Amsterdam in 1626. In 1664, the British took over New Amsterdam and renamed it New York. In 1683, the British built platforms of dirt off the island's southern tip for military defense, and again in 1735 as the Copsey Battery. Fort George/Amsterdam was fully razed in 1788 and the remains of it was used for expansion of the Battery.

Between 1808 and 1811 the Army Corps of Engineers, led by Jonathan Williams, constructed a new circular fort named the West Battery 200 feet from the shoreline. It was renamed Castle Clinton in honor of Governor De Witt Clinton in 1815. The United States Congress ceded it to the city in 1823. In 1824, it was renamed Castle Garden and functions as a place for entertainment. Shortly thereafter, more land was added to the park to extend it to an area of around 10 acres (4.0 ha) via landfill.

The Battery was mostly created by landfill starting from 1855, using earth from street-widening projects in Lower Manhattan which united Castle Garden's island with the "mainland" of Manhattan.

== FDR Drive and East River Park ==
FDR Drive was built along the East River shore in the 1930s using embankments and pilings.

East River Park was built on landfill. In December 2019, the New York City Council voted to approve the controversial $1.45 billion East Side Coastal Resiliency (ESCR) project, involving the park's complete demolition and subsequent renovation. This coastal protection program is designed to lower the risk of flooding on Manhattan's East Side, particularly from East 25th Street to Montgomery Street, because of coastal storms and sea level rise. In order to do so, the park will be renovated to reinforce higher elevation areas with flood-walls and flood gates which were designed to be seamlessly incorporated into nearby streets. Construction on the East Side Coastal Resilience project began in 2020 and will continue through 2026. So far, flood protection has been installed along the park with new pedestrian bridges and improved entryways. Between E. 15th and E. 25th Streets, floodgates and concrete floodwalls were installed along with improved infrastructure in 2024.

== Battery Park City ==
Battery Park City derives its name from the adjacent Battery Park. It was one of the only man-made neighborhoods in New York that was created by land reclamation. It lies between the Hudson River to the west, West Side Highway to the east, and N Esplanade to the north.

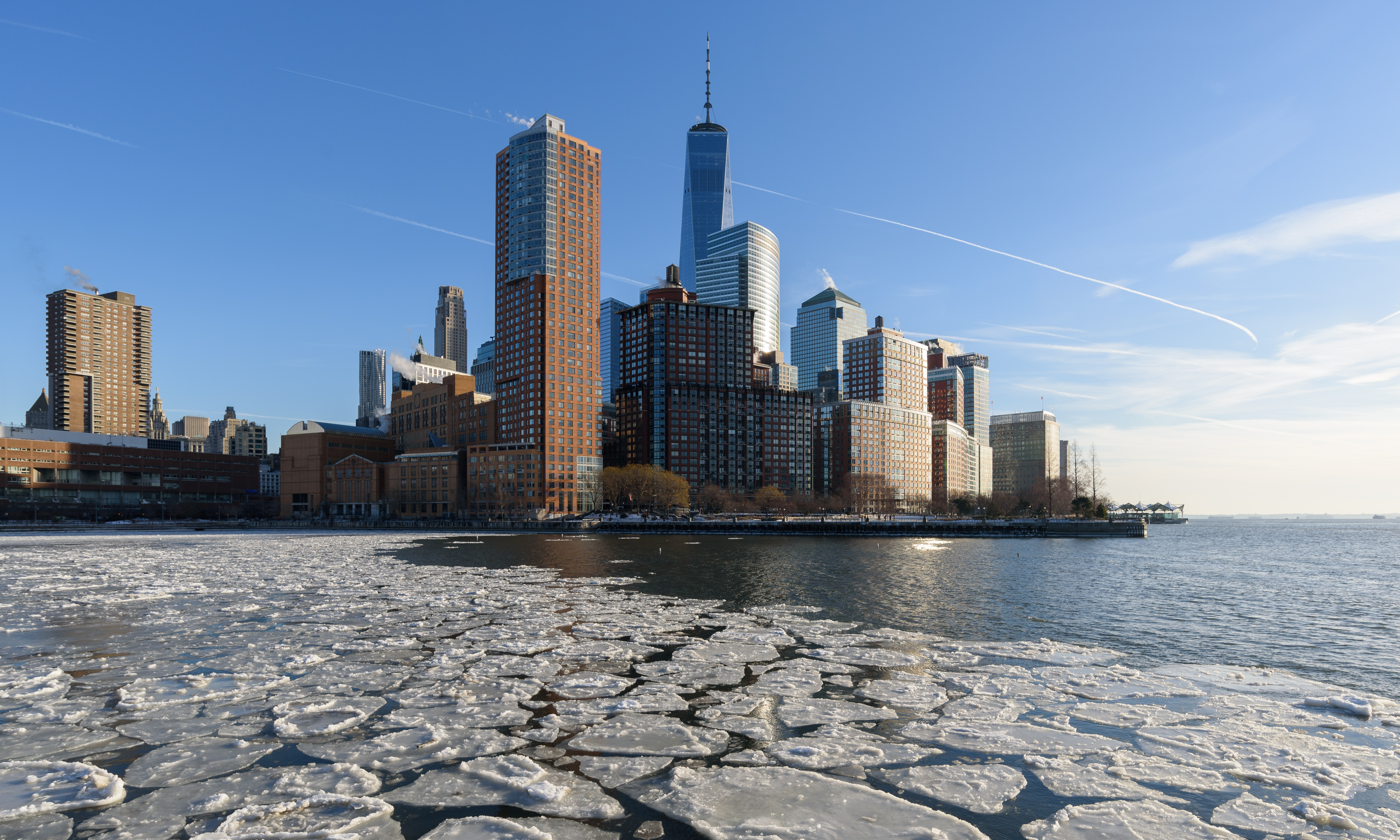
Battery Park City as seen from the Hudson River.

In the late 1950s, downtown Manhattan began to decline due to the rise of container shipping, which caused ship traffic to be diverted to Port Newark–Elizabeth Marine Terminal on Newark Bay. Eventually, Governor Nelson Rockefeller unveiled a new proposal, designed by architect Wallace K. Harrison in 1966, which aimed to construct a "comprehensive community" from a mixture of housing, social infrastructure and light industry projects.

In the 1960s–1970s, landfill was used in the creation of 92 acres (37 ha) that comprise Battery Park City. The Battery Park City Authority (BCPA), had been created by the New York State Legislature in 1968 to oversee the construction of the neighborhood, which issued $200 million in bonds to fund the project in 1972. The initial 24 acres (9.7 ha) utilized 1.2 million cubic yards (920,000 m3) of material from excavations for the construction of the original World Trade Center In July 1976, the landfill construction was finished and a parade was set up to mark the occasion. In 2010, the Urban Land Institute (ULI) awarded this plan the Heritage Award for developing 9.3 million square feet (860,000 m^{2}) of commercial space, 7.2 million square feet (670,000 m^{2}) of residential space, and nearly 36 acres (15 ha) of open space.

== South Street-East River ==
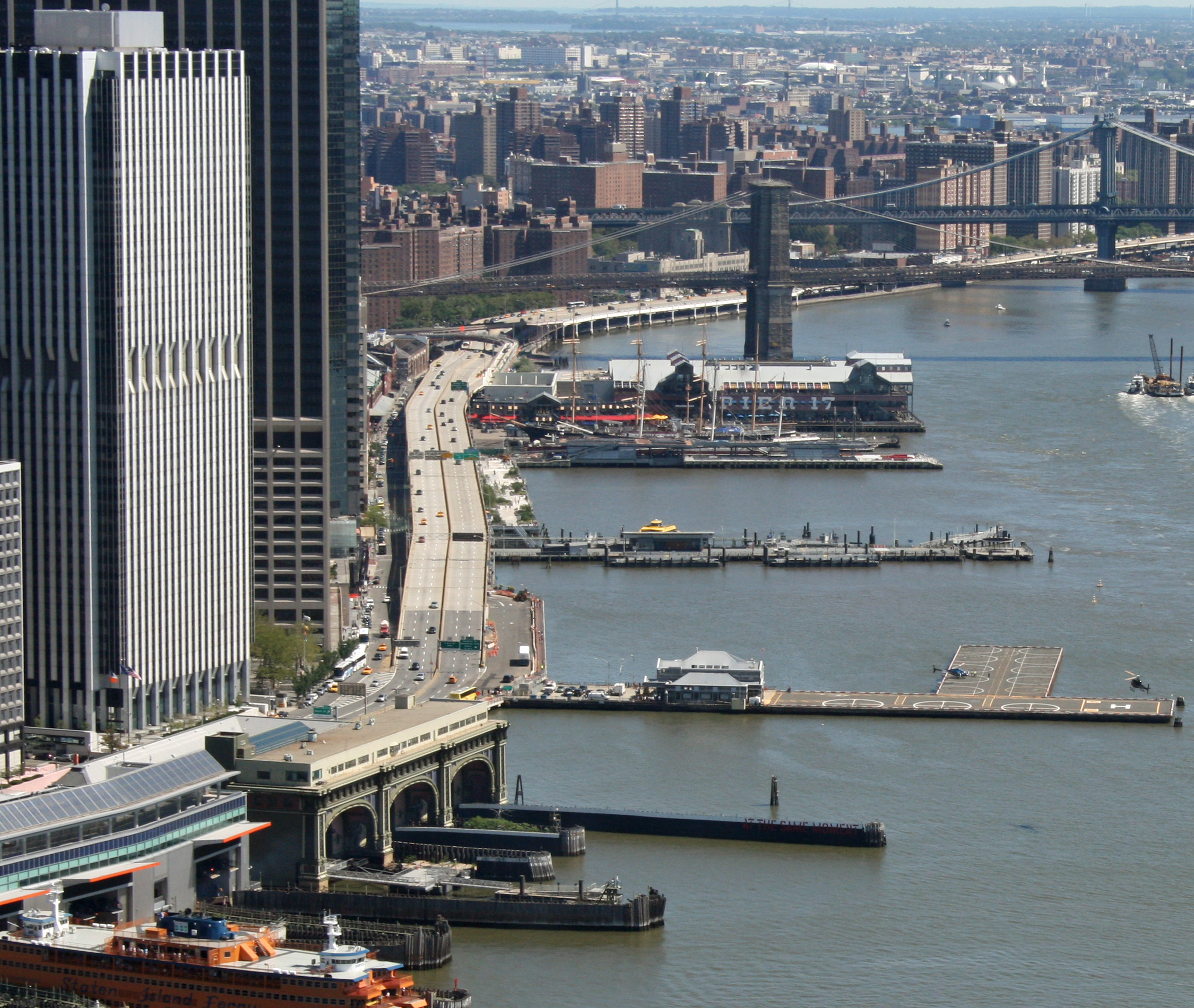
The FDR South Street Viaduct abuts the shoreline

The East River waterfront shifted to Water Street in 1730, Front Street in 1780, and finally, South Street in 1800. As part of A. Eric Arctander's 1980 artwork Nieuw Amsterdam Shoreline, the approximate path of the old shoreline was traced on several roads in the Financial District.

In 2013, then-mayor Michael Bloomberg proposed a "Seaport City" similar to Battery Park City for the area around the South Street Seaport. In 2019, as part of part of plan to mitigate potential damage due to climate change to South Street Seaport and the Financial District, his successor Bill de Blasio proposed creating upwards of 500 feet (150 m) of land reclamation from South Street into the East River south the Brooklyn Bridge.

In 2021, the City of New York introduced the Financial District-Seaport (FidiSeaport) Resilience Plan for a 0.9-mile (1.4 km) stretch of what is seen as the most complicated and vulnerable reach of shoreline in Lower Manhattan. Construction would incorporate floodwalls, floodgates, pumps, and other water management techniques to handle tidal flow, flooding and stormwater and extend 90 feet (27 m) to 200 feet (61 m) into the river.

== Gansevoort Peninsula ==
Gansevoort Peninsula, located in what is now known as the Meatpacking District at the northern end of Greenwich Village, was originally a spit of land jutting into the Hudson River. The North Battery was an artillery battery built 1808–1811 in the river, connected by a bridge and jetty/breakwater to Hubert Street. Fort Gansevoort was completed in 1812 between Gansevoort Street and West 12th Street. Thirteenth Avenue was created 1837 by landfill.

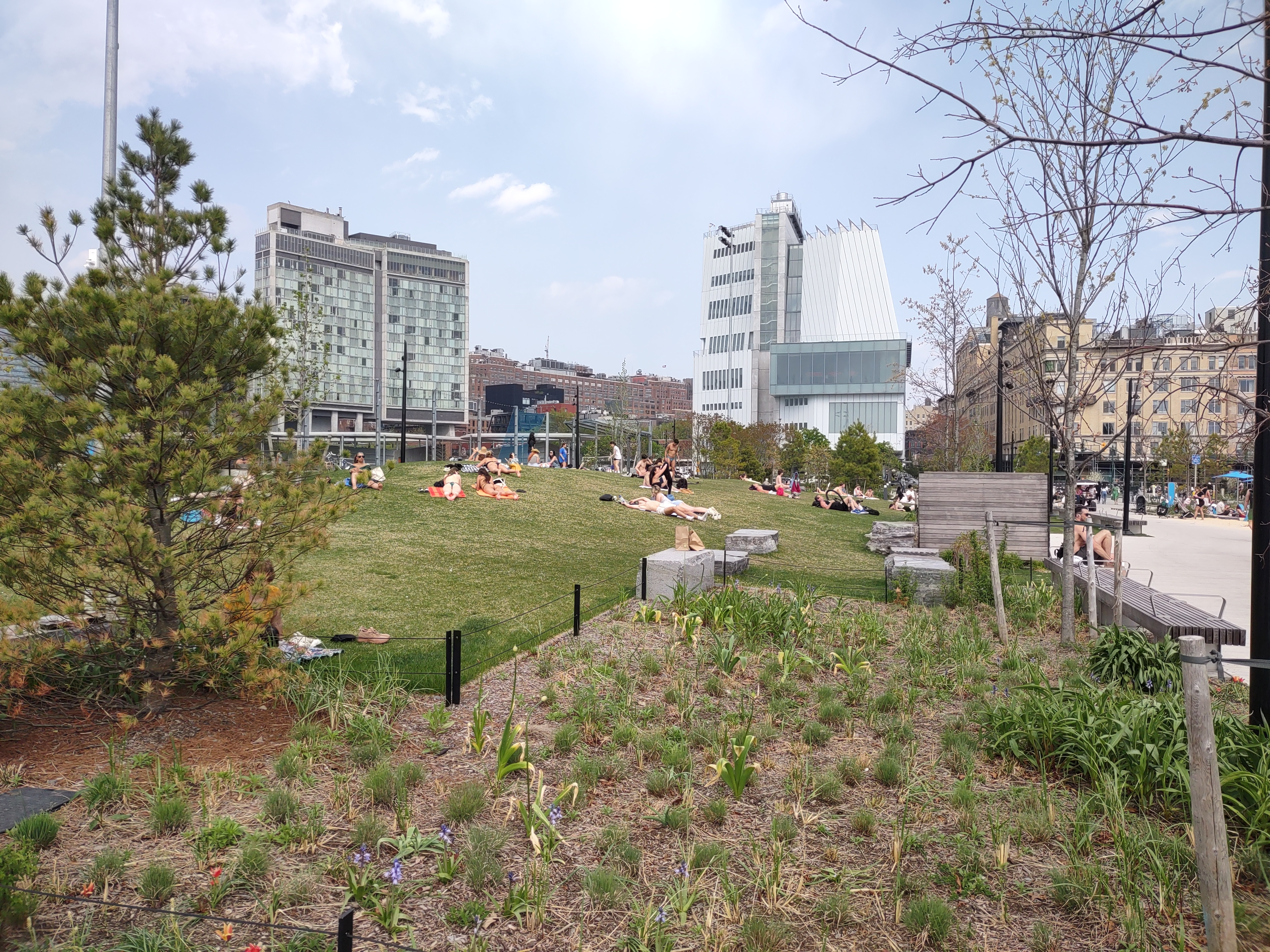
Gansevoort Peninsula In 2024

West Washington Market was created in 1887. New York City solved the problem in an unusual way by actually taking away a block of land that was the 1837 landfill that extended Manhattan to 13th Avenue. The controversial decision included condemning many businesses. The city was unable to condemn the West Washington Street Market, which remained a landfill. The market ultimately closed and the dock was converted to a sanitation facility that was used to load garbage barges headed for the Fresh Kills Landfill. The only section of 13th Avenue that remained was behind the sanitation facility. In 2016, the city began demolishing the Department of Sanitation building as part of a plan for the creation of a new public park on the land. Little Island at Pier 55 is just to the north.

== Collect Pond ==
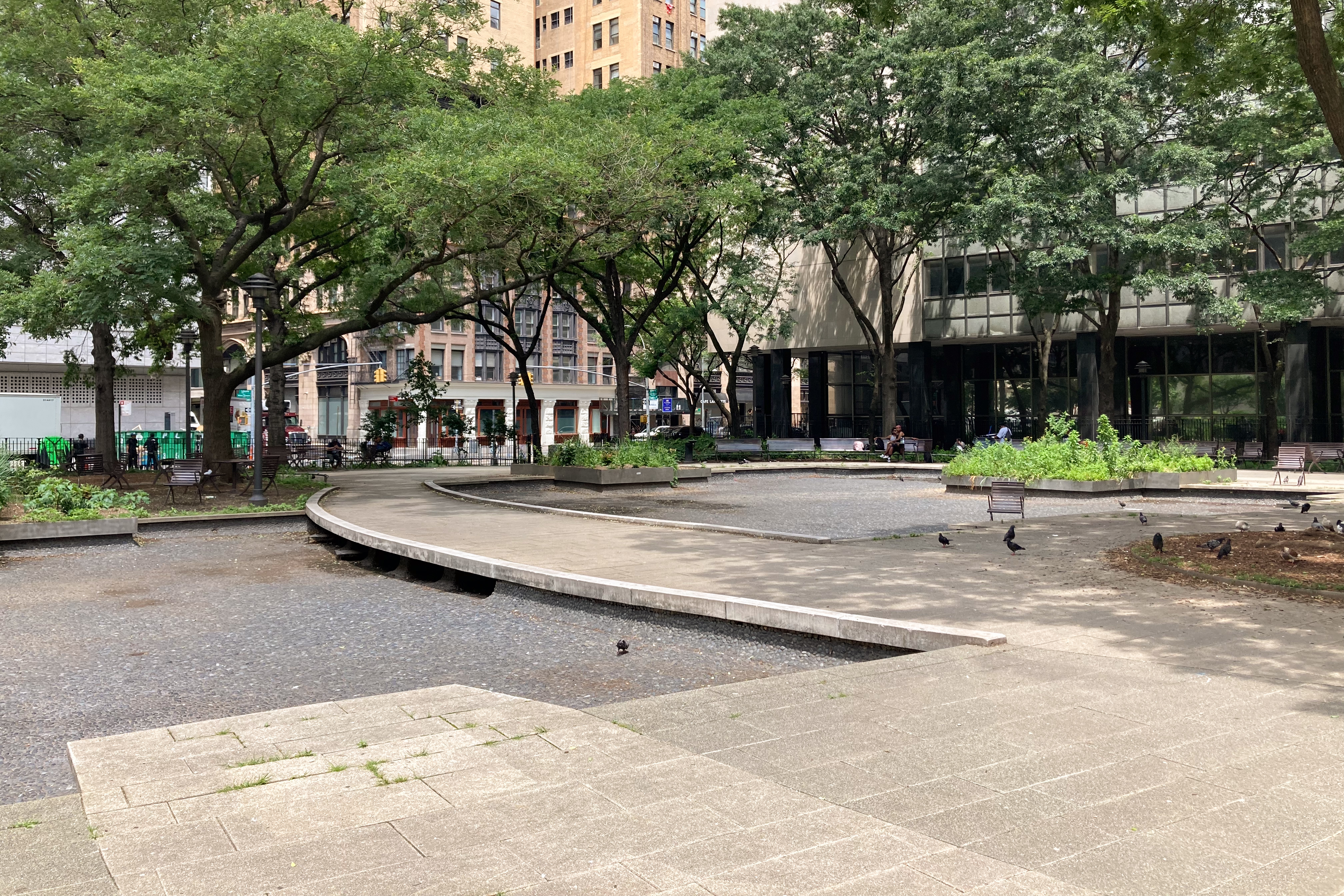
Collect Pond Park in Lower Manhattan

Collect Pond was a body of fresh water in what is today's Chinatown use for water supply and recreational activities such as ice skating and picnicking by the public. By 1800 it had become polluted from industrial waste. Therefore, the city built a canal in 1807 to first drain the polluted water into the Hudson and then finish filling the pond in 1811, using dirt from a nearby hill. It also filled the canal used to drain Collect Pond, creating modern day Canal Street. However, during the 1820s, Collect Pond, which started to become known as Paradise Square, began sinking, and by 1830, it became known as Five Points, an immigrant slum. This neighborhood was densely populated and since there was a "subterranean swamp", the area was rife with cholera. The city government ended all of the tenements at Five Points by 1894, four years after Jacob Riis published his book How the Other Half Lives, transforming the area into Civic Center, named for the substantial number of government offices located there. On April 28, 1960, the area was designated as a park, first being called Civil Court Park before NYC Department of Parks and Recreation Commissioner Henry J. Stern renamed it Collect Pond Park. It is located on Leonard Street and between Centre and Lafayette Streets.

== Expansion proposals ==
=== A Really Greater New York ===
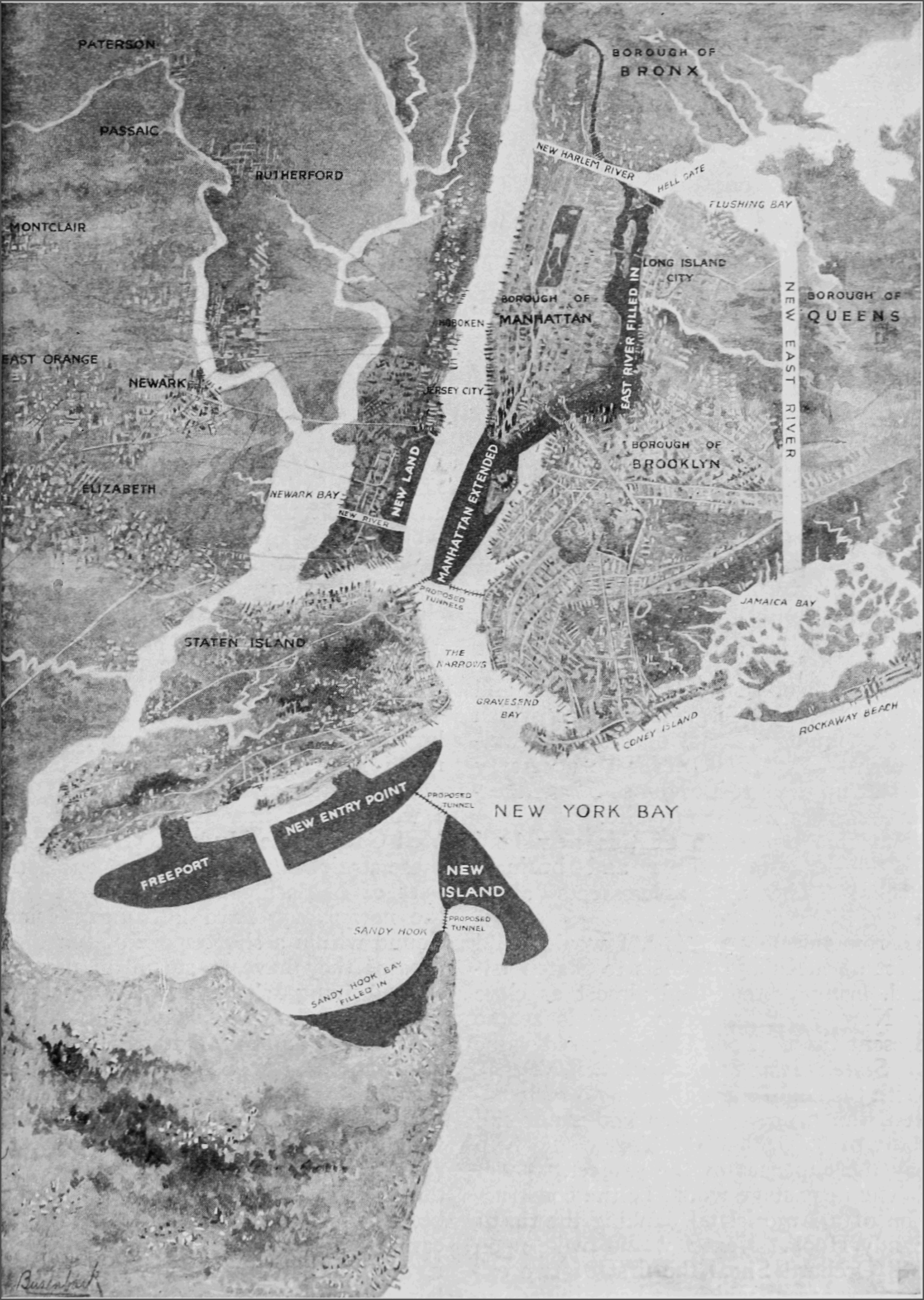
T. Kennard Thomson's proposal, "A Really Greater New York", Popular Science 1916

Canadian-American engineer T. Kennard Thomson first made an expansive proposal for "A Really Greater New York" in 1911, incorporating a lower Manhattan expansion into Governors Island (at that time undergoing land reclamation itself) as "New Manhattan", as well as other ambitious designs such as new Lower New York Bay islands, and filling in and creating new rivers. One of his goals was to halt the historical march uptown, which was seen as detrimental to downtown businesses. Thomson made different versions of this idea through the years, forming a "Manhattan Extension" corporation in 1921 with support from prominent former judge and presidential candidate Alton B. Parker as well as the artist Walter Russell, and continuing advocacy for the rest of his life.

=== LoLo ===
A 2011 proposal by Vishaan Chakrabarti, a professor at Columbia University's Center for Urban Real Estate, suggested using land fill to connect lower Manhattan and Governors Island, so creating a new neighborhood referred to as "LoLo" (Lower Lower Manhattan). Chakrabarti and others pointed out challenges to the proposal, which include cost, the strict regulations surrounding building with landfill, and the potential environmental effects of the project. The proposal was revisited in 2015 by author Jon Methven of The Awl, in which he referred to the proposed borough as "Frankenborough".

A 2022 proposal by Rutgers University urban economist Jason Barr named "New Mannahatta" suggested extending Lower Manhattan by creating 1,760 acres (7.1 km^{2}) of reclaimed land to provide housing and combat climate change. The plan, named after the indigenous term for Manhattan, would extend beyond Liberty Island into New York Harbor. In his New York Times opinion piece directed by Mayor Eric Adams, Barr argues that this extension, incorporating Governors Island, would address rising sea levels and provide 180,000 new homes for 247,000 people. The project would use wetlands to absorb storm surges and protect vulnerable areas. This proposal was criticized by Willy Blackmore in Curbed on environmental grounds.

== See also ==
- Geography of New York–New Jersey Harbor Estuary
- Vision 2020: New York City Comprehensive Waterfront Plan
- Manhattan Waterfront Greenway § Storm barrier
- Freshkills Park
- New York Harbor Storm-Surge Barrier
- East Shore Seawall
- Billion Oyster Project
- Sawing-off of Manhattan Island
