= Lower Manhattan Coastal Resiliency =

Climate change project

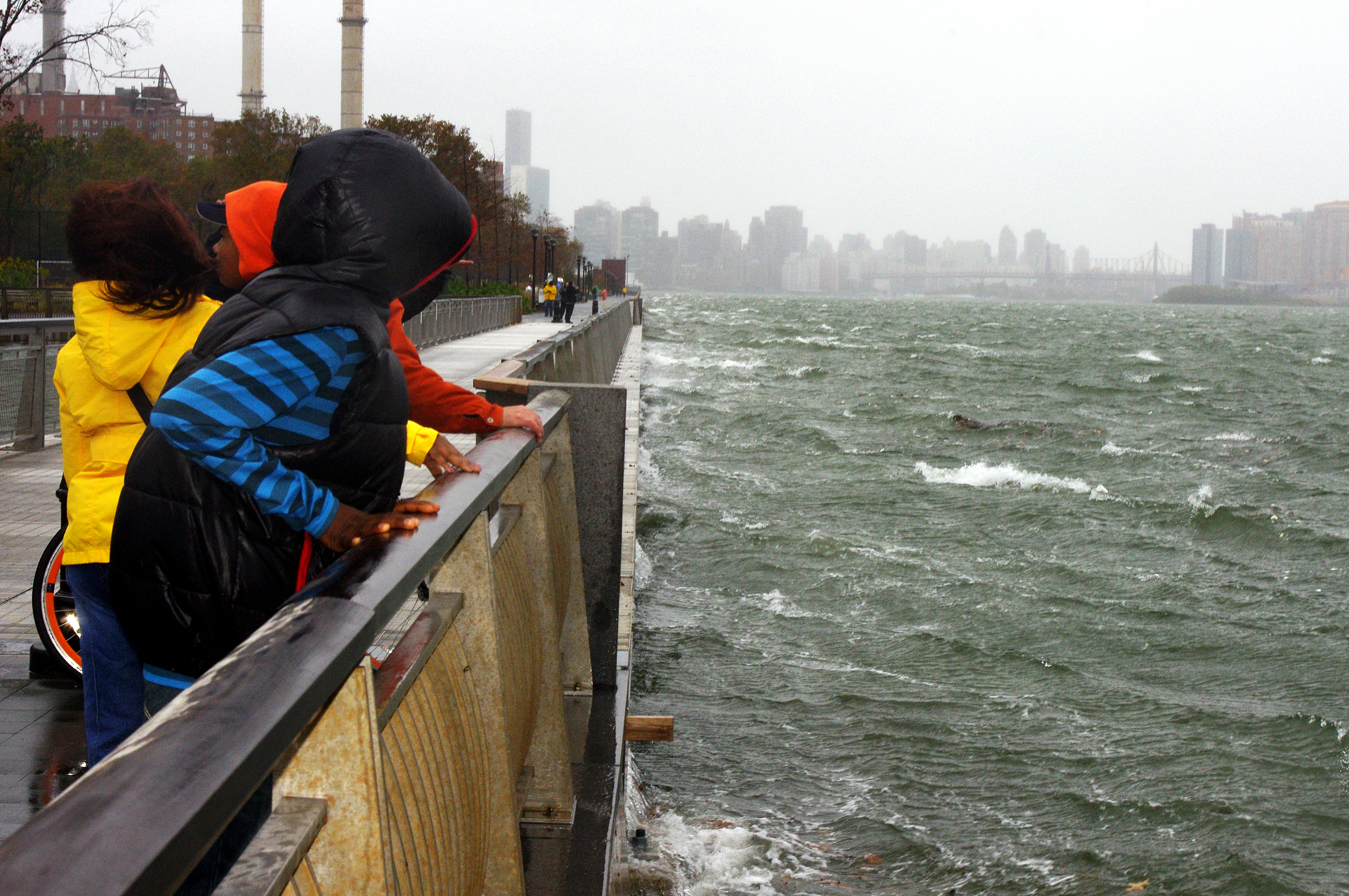
Coastal edge of East River Park during Hurricane Sandy in 2012

Lower Manhattan Coastal Resiliency (LMCR) refers to a set of projects aimed to address potential impacts of climate change on the Lower Manhattan area of New York City. The Lower Manhattan Coastal Resiliency projects involve constructing flood barriers, as well as redesigning and elevating waterfront public spaces to reduce the risk of flooding from coastal storms and sea level rise in Lower Manhattan. The projects focus on Battery Park City, the Battery, the Financial District, South Street Seaport, the Two Bridges neighborhood, and East River Park.

The need to protect New York City against major storms and sea-level rise became more urgent in the wake of the extensive Hurricane Sandy flooding in 2012. The initiative builds on earlier design proposals including The Big U, which also informed the adjacent East Side Coastal Resiliency project in East River Park. The projects are a more localized alternative to the New York Harbor Storm-Surge Barrier, and have some continuity with the centuries-long Lower Manhattan expansion trend. It seeks to compensate for the historical loss of wetland buffer zones, and would be integrated into the Manhattan Waterfront Greenway.

== History ==
In 2006, New York City established the Mayor's Office of Long-Term Planning and Sustainability and released PlaNYC in 2007, a comprehensive sustainability strategy. PlaNYC aimed to reduce greenhouse gas emissions and mitigate potential effects of climate change, and included coastal flood resilience measures such as wetlands restoration.

In 2008, Mayor Michael Bloomberg established the New York City Panel on Climate Change (NPCC) to assess potential risks of climate change on New York City. The panel issued its first report in 2009, projecting a rise in mean global temperatures and sea-level rise, and in New York City there would be increased precipitation, coastal storm surge and extreme storm events over the next decades, increasing long-term coastal flooding risk in low-lying including Lower Manhattan. The NPCC estimated that the mean sea level in the New York metropolitan region could rise approximately 7-12 inches by the 2050s and 12-23 inches by the 2080s. The NPCC also evaluated a “rapid ice-melt” scenario that could be possible depending on how polar ice sheets respond to warming. In this scenario, sea level could rise by 41-55 inches, providing an upper-bound estimate.

=== Hurricane Sandy impacts ===
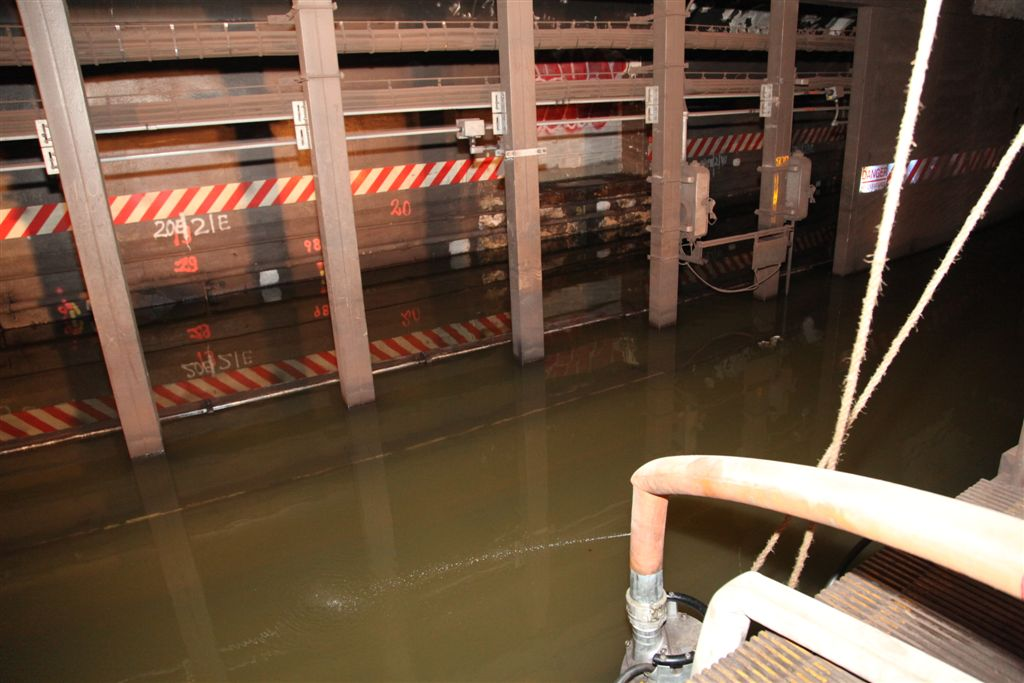
South Ferry subway station after Hurricane Sandy

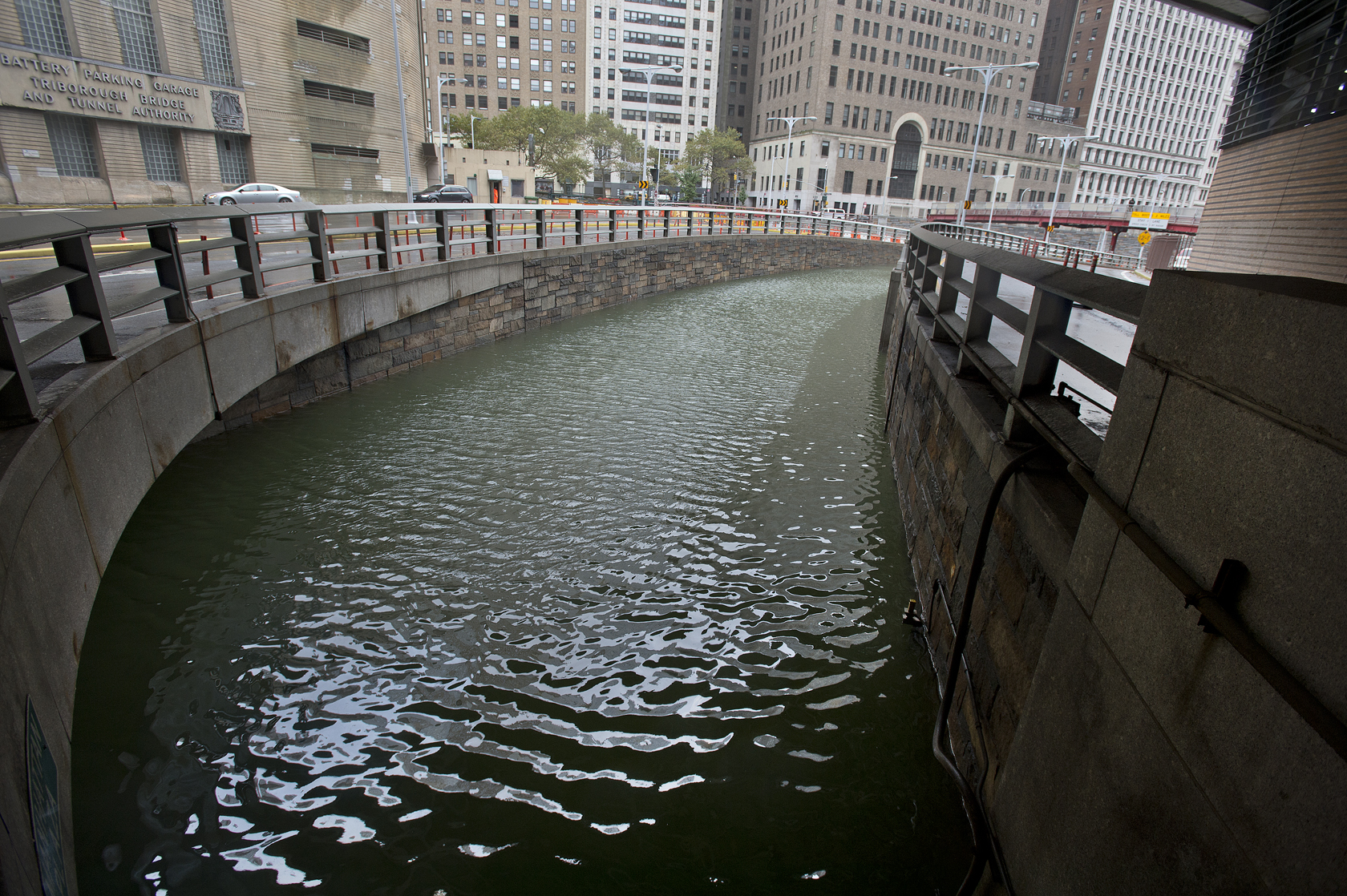
Northern access to Brooklyn–Battery Tunnel flooded during Hurricane Sandy

While PlaNYC measures implemented prior to 2012 helped reduce the impacts of Hurricane Sandy, severe flooding and significant damage still occurred when the hurricane struck the city. At the Battery, storm surge reached 14.1 feet above mean lower low water, while the mean tidal range (between low and high tide) was 4.53 feet, causing flooding around the Battery, in the South Ferry subway station, along West Street, at the entrance of the Brooklyn–Battery Tunnel, as well as around the South Street Seaport and other parts of the Financial District and Lower Manhattan.

In December 2012, the city established the Special Initiative for Rebuilding and Resiliency (SIRR) to assess the impact of Hurricane Sandy and evaluate enhanced flood protection and long-term climate adaptation strategies. The SIRR report identified Lower Manhattan as one of the most vulnerable areas due to its low elevation and concentration of critical transportation and other infrastructure.

=== Project proposals ===
After Hurricane Sandy, the United States Department of Housing and Urban Development launched the Rebuild by Design competition, seeking proposals for projects that would mitigate the impact of future storms and flooding in areas affected by Hurricane Sandy. One of the winning proposals was BIG U, developed by Bjarke Ingels Group, which envisioned flood-protection measures encircling Lower Manhattan, including berms, flood walls, deployable barriers, and raised parkland. The original BIG-U proposal was criticized as inadequate in parts and too costly to maintain.

In contrast to localized flood protection measures like the BIG U, some academics and engineers suggested more ambitious storm surge barriers and seawalls across the New York–New Jersey Harbor Estuary to protect the entire region. Governor Andrew Cuomo publicly supported evaluating such systems, and the United States Army Corps of Engineers examined larger-scale coastal storm risk management approaches including storm barriers.

Bloomberg's 2013 concept of "Seaport City" was another proposal for extending the shoreline through land reclamation to protect the Financial District and South Street Seaport areas. This has been replaced by the Financial District and Seaport Climate Resilience Plan, as part of the wider LMCR initiative by the De Blasio administration. It updates the BIG U with more substantial land reclamation that could be funded and finished, avoiding the occasional temporary flooding of the earlier plan and its maintenance costs.

As the BIG U provided a more abstract proposal for flood resiliency, the city determined there was a need for a more detailed study and assessment of climate change risks and mitigation options. The city commissioned the Lower Manhattan Climate Resilience Study, which published a report in 2019. The study modeled flood risk based on New York City Panel on Climate Change (NPCC) sea-level rise projections through 2050 and 2100, showing that many parts of Lower Manhattan are at major risk of both daily tidal flooding and flooding due to extreme storm events. The study also evaluated various adaptation measures, including flood walls and raised shorelines, deployable floodgates, elevating waterfront areas and infrastructure, and hardening buildings and utilities against flooding. The report issued adaptation recommendations for the study areas, except the Financial District and Seaport area, which has a more complex situation that required a more detailed neighborhood-scale master plan. The report recommended interim flood protection measures for the Financial District and Seaport areas, while longer-term plans are being formed.

With subsequent planning and community feedback, the BIG U proposal has evolved into the Lower Manhattan Coastal Resiliency and East Side Coastal Resiliency projects. As a winning proposal in Rebuild by Design, the BIG U won $335 million in Community Development Block Grant for Disaster Recovery (CDBG-DR) funding, however this amount was not enough for implementing the entire project. The funding was allocated towards the East Side Coastal Resiliency project, and Lower Manhattan Coastal Resiliency is being implemented as a series of separate projects.

== Project components ==
The Lower Manhattan Coastal Resiliency project is divided into multiple components, with the project area including Battery Park City, The Battery, the Financial District and South Street Seaport area, and extending up the East River to Montgomery Street.

=== Battery Park City ===
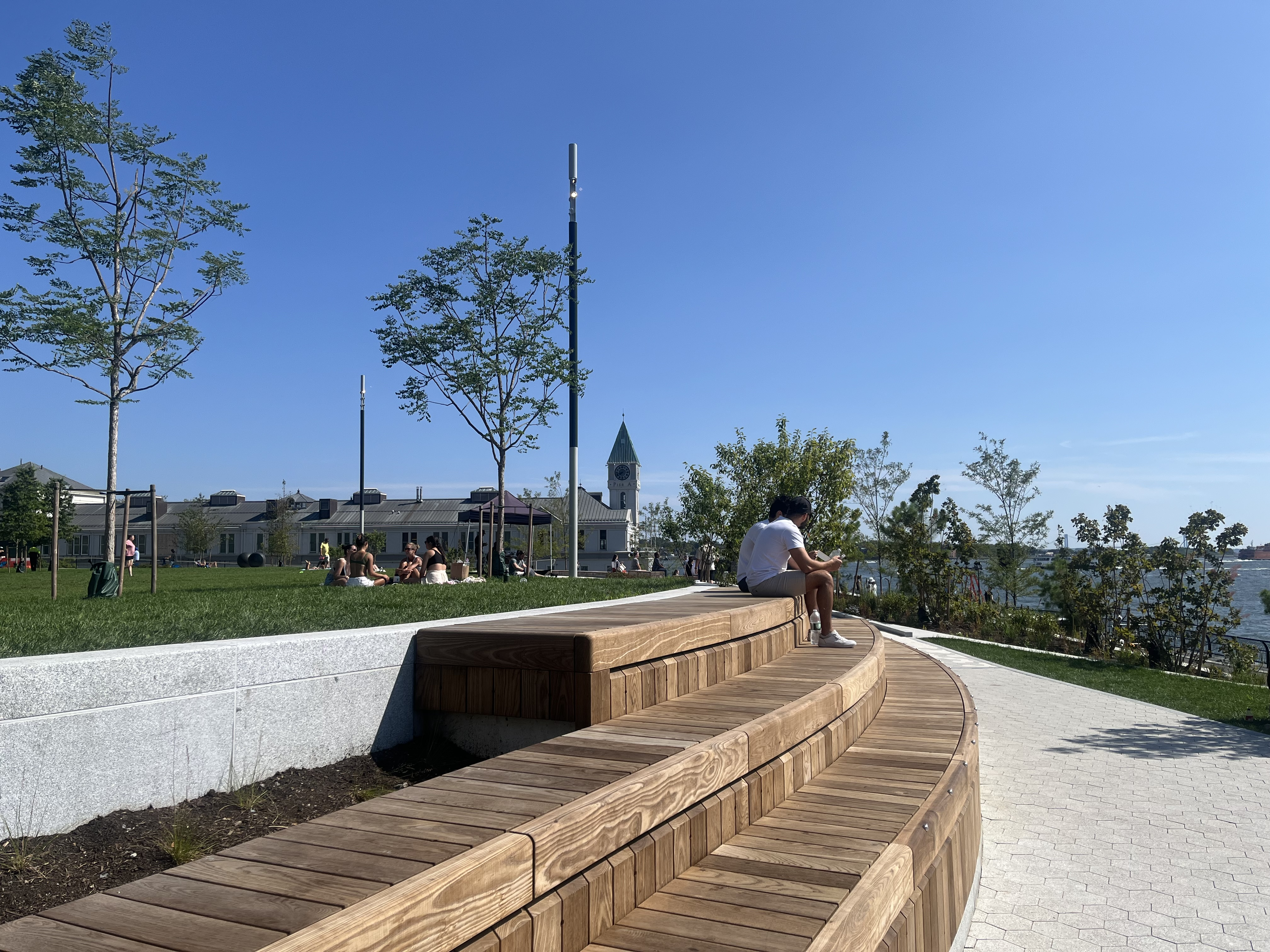
Newly reopened Wagner Park in 2025

The Battery Park City component of the Lower Manhattan Coastal Resiliency projects has been divided into two phases, starting with the South Battery Park City Resiliency Project, which involved rebuilding Wagner Park at the southern end of the neighborhood. The second phase is the North/West Battery Park City Resiliency Project which will implement flood defenses throughout the rest of the neighborhood. The combined cost of the Battery Park City resiliency projects is estimated to be $1.6 billion, funded through the issuance of bonds by the Battery Park City Authority.

==== South Battery Park City Resiliency Project ====
The South Battery Park City Resiliency Project construction started in early 2023, with demolition of Wagner Park. The park reopened in July 2025, with an elevated lawn area and terraced stepped seating and paths that lead down to the esplanade level. The park also includes a new pavilion building, set to open in 2026. There is a flood wall buried beneath the park, and the park is elevated by 10 feet. The South Battery Park City Resiliency Project, which cost $300 million, faced opposition and lawsuits from some local residents, since the park did not flood during Hurricane Sandy.

==== North/West Battery Park City Resiliency Project ====
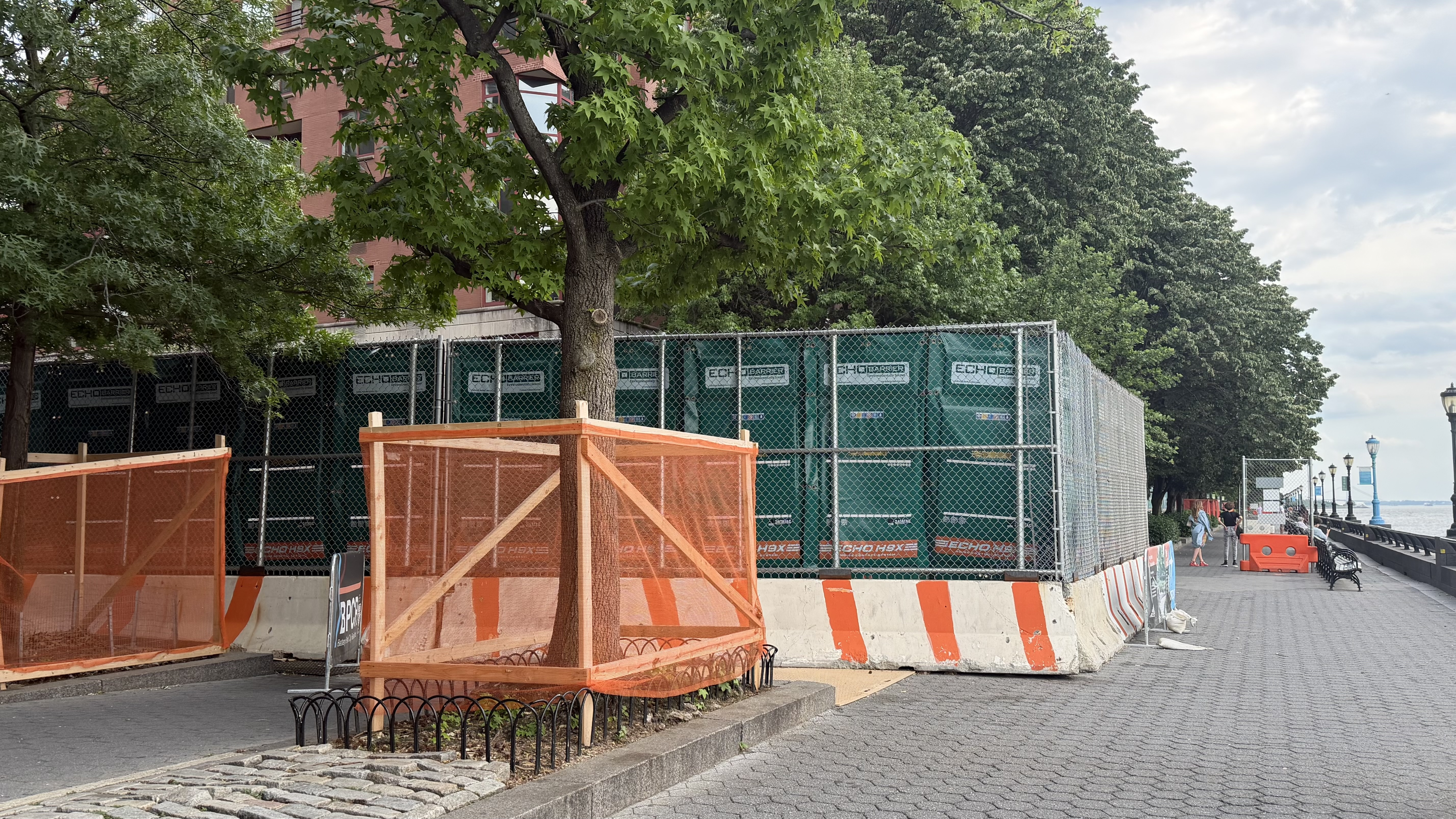
Construction barriers along the Battery Park City Esplanade, at Albany Street

The second phase is the North/West Battery Park City Resiliency Project, which involves building coastal flood barriers along the waterfront in Battery Park City, from the South Cove (north of Wagner Park) to the north esplanade next to Stuyvesant High School and extending some distance north along the West Side Highway in Tribeca. The project commenced in late 2025, with site preparation work, and is expected to be completed in 2031. In November 2025, The Upper Room artwork at Albany Street was demolished to allow constructing tide gates.

The developer of the Cove Club condominium complex refused to allow the Battery Park City Authority to temporarily access their property to install monitoring equipment, which delayed the start of phase 2's construction. This prompted the authority to sue Cove Club in early 2026. The Battery Park City Authority also failed to reach agreement with the Liberty House and Liberty Terrace condo buildings on access to private property for construction of the flood walls, and will need to rework some of the designs along the esplanade. Parts of the waterfront, including a dog run and Kowsky Park Playground, were closed for flood protection work that April.

=== The Battery ===
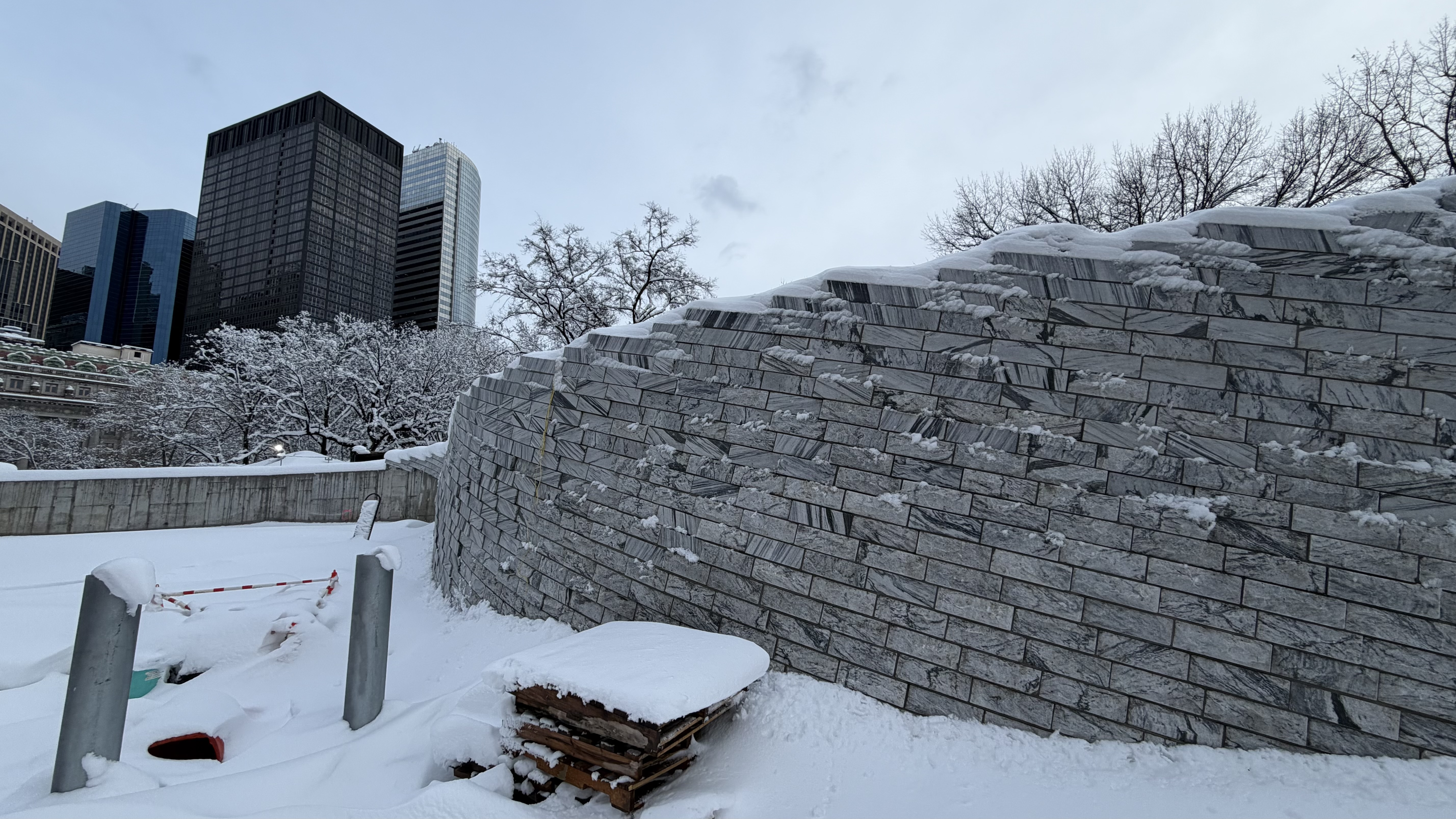
New flood wall under construction in The Battery, along Battery Place

The Battery Coastal Resilience project aims to enhance flood protection around The Battery, which is a historic park that is home to Castle Clinton. The park was heavily flooded during Hurricane Sandy. The project is constrained by the presence of numerous subway tunnels beneath the park, as well as the Battery Park Underpass and Brooklyn–Battery Tunnel. The first phase of the project, which started in May 2024, includes elevating the esplanade along the park waterfront. The first phase was completed in June 2026.

The second phase involves constructing a berm and raising portions of the park, and connecting them with flood walls and defenses constructed in nearby. Construction of the second phase will occur in 2026 and 2027.

=== Financial District - Seaport ===
The Financial District-Seaport Coastal Resilience project has been guided by a neighborhood master plan, released in 2021, that proposes expanding and elevating the waterfront to protect the neighborhood from long-term sea level rise, daily tidal flooding and storm surge. The proposed project plan features include buried flood walls stabilized by steel cofferdam structures, raised parkland built on new landfill, deployable flood gates, enhanced stormwater drainage systems and pump stations to ensure proper drainage during extreme storm events.

The project also involves demolishing the Coast Guard building in Battery Park, in order to make space for a new Staten Island Ferry terminal building. The Staten Island Ferry Whitehall Terminal building would be demolished and a new ferry terminal building constructed for the Governors Island ferry on the same site. The new ferry buildings would include flood defense systems on the lower levels. The historic Battery Maritime Building would be preserved and surrounded by new flood defenses and an elevated esplanade. The project also includes improved bike paths around the ferry terminals and along the waterfront.

The project is estimated to take 15-20 years to complete, and cost $5-7 billion. As of late 2025, funding has not yet been secured for the project, with uncertainty regarding Federal Government support.

=== Brooklyn Bridge-Montgomery Coastal Resilience ===
The Brooklyn Bridge-Montgomery Coastal Resilience project involves building flood walls, along with deployable flip-up barriers and flood gates along the East River, between the Brooklyn Bridge and Montgomery Street. Construction began in 2023 and the project is planned to be completed in late 2026, at a cost of $522 million, including $172 million from a United States Department of Housing and Urban Development National Disaster Resilience grant. As part of the project, the esplanade is being rebuilt to include a new playground, performance space, picnic area and other amenities.

=== East Side Coastal Resiliency ===
Extending north along the East River, is the East Side Coastal Resiliency project, which extends from Montgomery Street to East 25th Street. The project involves reconstructing and elevating East River Park, with 18 deployable floodgates installed at cross-street entrances to the park. Construction for the East Side Coastal Resiliency began in 2020. Project completion is expected in 2027, with sections of the East River Park re-opened in 2025. The cost for the East Side Coastal Resiliency project is $1.45 billion, up from an earlier $760 million estimate, and is designed to protect against a 100-year storm through 2050.

== See also ==
- Land reclamation in Lower Manhattan
- Geography of New York–New Jersey Harbor Estuary
- East Shore Seawall
- Sea Bright–Monmouth Beach Seawall
- New York Harbor Storm-Surge Barrier
