= East River Park =

Public park in Manhattan, New York

- Interactive map of East River Park
- Location: Manhattan, New York
- Coordinates: 40°43′03″N 73°58′27″W
- Etymology: named after John V. Lindsay
- Owner: NYC Parks
- Status: Partially Open / Under Construction
- Website: http://www.nycgovparks.org/parks/east-river-park/

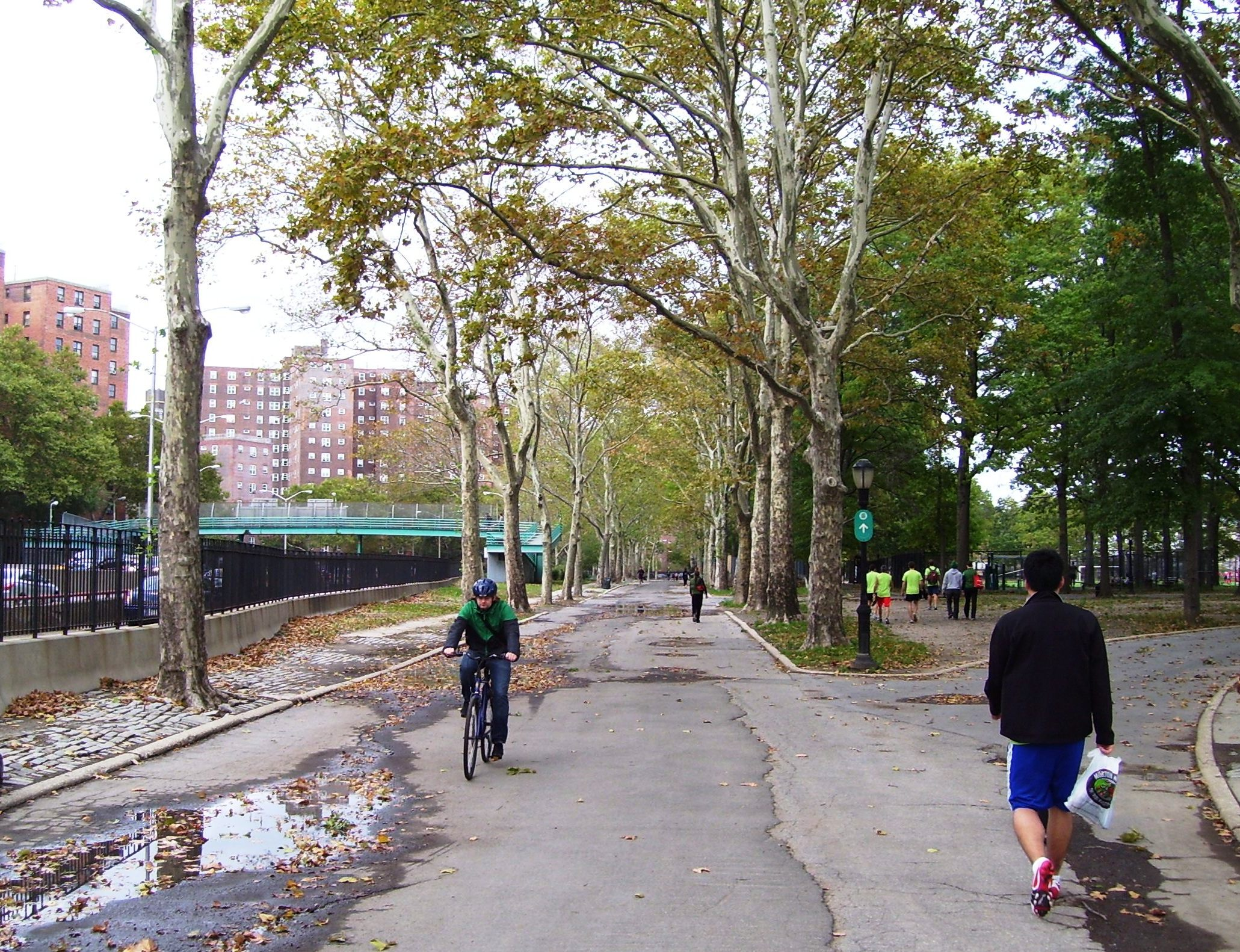
Pre-reconstruction walkway adjacent to FDR Drive, October 2010

East River Park, also called John V. Lindsay East River Park, is a 57.5-acre (20 ha) public park located on the Lower East Side of Manhattan. What remains of it is still administered by the New York City Department of Parks and Recreation. Bisected by the Williamsburg Bridge, it stretched along the East River from Montgomery Street up to 12th Street on the east side of the FDR Drive. Its now-demolished amphitheater, built in 1941 just south of Grand Street, had been reconstructed and was often used for public performances. The park included football, baseball, and soccer fields and a running track: Now only the tennis, basketball, and handball courts and some bike paths, including some parts of the East River Greenway remain. Its East River shoreline still makes fishing a popular recreational activity at all hours of the day.

The park and the surrounding neighborhood were flooded during Hurricane Sandy in 2012, prompting city officials to consider flood mitigation plans that would alter it by raising the elevation of the park to allow the green space to supposedly also act as a berm against storm surge and other flooding events. In December 2019, the New York City Council voted to approve the controversial $1.45 billion East Side Coastal Resiliency project, involving the park's complete demolition and subsequent renovation, that will elevate it by 8 to 10 feet (2.4 to 3.0 m). A barrier measuring 2.4 miles (3.9 km) long would be built under the park. Original plans called for closing the park entirely from 2020 to 2023, but after protests from residents, the plans were modified in late 2019 to a partial five-year closure. Work is expected to continue through 2026.

== History ==
=== Early history ===
Conceived in the early 1930s by Robert Moses, East River Park opened on July 27, 1939. Prior to this time, the East River waterfront had been an active shipping yard and later became home to many of the city's poorest immigrants.

The park became the largest open green space on the Lower East Side. Since that time, the park has been encroached upon by various roadway projects such as the widening of the FDR Drive and the extension of South Street. Still, the park provided a respite for residents of the area, particularly in summer months when there are refreshing breezes from the river.

In 1998, through an agreement with the New York City Parks Department, the Lower East Side Ecology Center became the steward of the park. The local environmental nonprofit had been the park's caretaker and had its offices and education center inside the Fire Boat House, located in the park near the Williamsburg Bridge. Each year the Ecology Center led thousands of volunteers in up-keeping the park, tending to garden beds, and enhancing the park by planting hundreds of thousands of native plants and bulbs.

After the September 11, 2001 attacks, the city rebuilt the amphitheater, which had fallen into disrepair. A new soccer field was also built at this time. Companies throughout the U.S. donated materials for the reconstruction, and the project was finished in record time and dedicated to those children who lost parents in the attacks. In December 2001, East River Park was renamed after former New York City Mayor John Lindsay.

In 2008 the City Parks Foundation brought free music, dance, and theater arts programming to the amphitheater in an effort to further engage the surrounding communities in the revitalization of the park. The first performance held was a music concert by Fiery Furnaces which drew an audience of 1,500. KRS-One and Willie Colón also performed that year, drawing crowds upward of 3,000 people.

=== Proposals for reconstruction ===
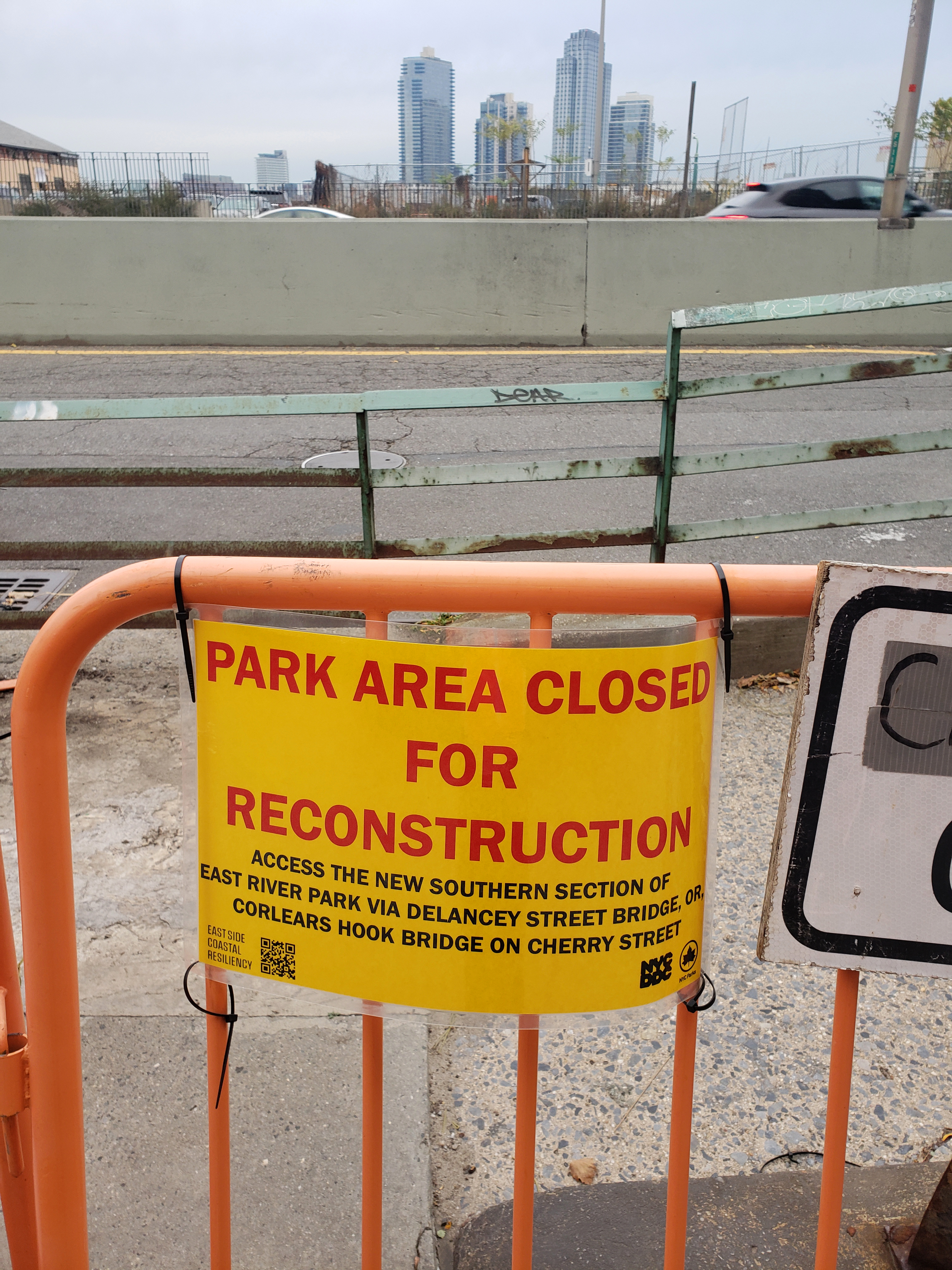
Signage at 6th Street bridge to East River Park, late 2025

Hurricane Sandy flooded the East River Park and the Lower East Side in 2012 prompting city officials to consider flood mitigation plans that would alter the park. In June 2013, U.S. Department of Housing and Urban Development (HUD) secretary Shaun Donovan launched Rebuild by Design, a competition which called for experts to develop solutions for neighborhoods disproportionately impacted by Hurricane Sandy. Ten of the 150 proposals were selected as finalists, and seven received a total of $930 million in federal grants. The largest grant, totaling $335 million, was given to the "Big U" proposal, a berm surrounding Lower Manhattan. One of the largest segments of the Big U was known as the East Side Coastal Resiliency project, and promised to improve the resiliency of the park and the surrounding Lower East Side neighborhood. The resulting plan, supported by local residents, elected officials, and advocacy groups, included an 8-foot (2.4 m) berm along FDR Drive from East 23rd Street to Montgomery Street, which would decrease the severity of flooding in the surrounded area. From 2015 to 2018 city agencies continued the process of participatory design that the Big U's designers had commenced.

Starting in early 2018 the City underwent a months-long internal "value engineering review", in which they met with designers and planners to determine the feasibility of the proposal. A FOIA request for documentation of this review process revealed several obstacles to the original plan, including concerns about flooding and the location of high-voltage Con-Edison power lines. In September 2018 the office of Mayor Bill de Blasio announced that, based on the findings of the internal value engineering review, the proposed berm would be completely removed and the whole park would be raised. It was claimed that the new plan would be faster and less disruptive, moving the bulk of the construction away from residents directly alongside FDR Drive, instead placing the improvements alongside the water. The new plan was referred to by its engineers as the "Value Alternative LI-29" plan.” The review determined that this plan would be not only be more effective but also cheaper and faster, a concern that addressed the 2022 deadline associated with HUD funding (now extended to 2023). When asked twice during the 2019 press conference announcing it, “When did your administration determine that the BIG U plan was not reasonable?” de Blasio did not respond.

Following their announcement, the plan had to be approved by Community Boards 3 and 6, and then the New York City Council. In July 2019, the new plan was presented to Community Board 3 by the Department of Design and Construction (DDC), following several months of public consultation with residents. The City Council typically defers to incumbent councilmembers regarding land-use decisions in their districts; in the East River Park decision, these were councilmembers Margaret Chin of District 1 and Carlina Rivera of District 2. Both secured concessions from the city. Original plans called for closing the park entirely from 2020 to 2023, but after protests from residents, the plans were modified in late 2019 to a partial five-year closure. In December 2019, the City Council voted to approve the $1.45 billion East Side Coastal Resiliency project, which would involve a complete demolition of the park and subsequent renovation that will elevate it by 8 to 10 feet (2.4 to 3.0 m). A barrier measuring 2.4 miles (3.9 km) long would be built under the park.

=== Renovation ===
The park's mature trees were cut starting November 2021, and demolition began in December 2021, prompting protests and court orders against the work. In early 2022, construction on the southern half of the park commenced, beginning with the demolition of athletic fields, the amphitheater, and a section of the East River Esplanade. Asbestos was found in a sub-basement structure under the amphitheater in late August 2022, and has raised concerns from activists. The city announced that it had completed asbestos abatement in October 2022, nine months after the demolition of the amphitheater. Work is expected to continue through 2026, during which time significant sections of the park will be closed.

In September 2024, the city government finished reconstructing two of the park's ballfields, and it opened a new footbridge at Delancey Street. This was part of the first phase of the East Side Coastal Resiliency project, which also included the reconstruction of Stuyvesant Cove Park and Asser Levy Recreation Center. The second phase of the project, which includes rebuilding East River Park, is to be completed in 2026. Part of the rebuilt East River Park south of the Williamsburg Bridge was reopened on Memorial Day weekend in May 2025, featuring six tennis courts, two basketball courts, picnic and barbecue areas, a nature exploration area, and approximately 600 new trees. Some noted the "sterile" feeling along with the lack of shade from missing mature trees. In 2024 and 2025, it was projected that the full project is expected to be completed in 2027.

=== Criticism ===
Critics of the current renovation plan have voiced concerns over the cost, oversight, lack of resident involvement, destruction of plants (including more than 1,000 mature trees), and bird and animal habitats. One alternative presented by critics was a plan for storm barriers along the FDR. Community members also argued that the park closure will primarily impact low-income NYCHA residents and that, in reality, the renovation project will leave the Lower East Side especially vulnerable to storm surge during the renovation.

Supporters of the current plan include ex-Councilwoman Rivera, Mayors Bill de Blasio and Eric Adams, and neighborhood organization Good Old Lower East Side (GOLES).

In February 2020, a dozen groups and 75 individuals, including members of East River Park Action, sued the city to stop the ESCR based on the grounds that the plan would sever the park from the surrounding community and requires approval from the state legislature. State Supreme Court Justice Melissa Crane, a de Blasio appointee, ruled against opposition groups and in August 2020, the city was given approval to begin park demolition. State Assemblymember Yuh-Line Niou and incoming city councilman Christopher Marte expressed support for the protesters.

Another notable protest before the destruction included one at Tompkins Square Park on October 31, 2021, which involved the groups 1000People1000Trees and East River Park Action. People came dressed for Halloween and themes around the park's demise including one man who came as “Bulldozer Bill.” He was suited and masked as then Mayor de Blasio and walked with a mock chainsaw labeled “ESCR” and repeatedly pretended to cut down another protester dressed as a tree.

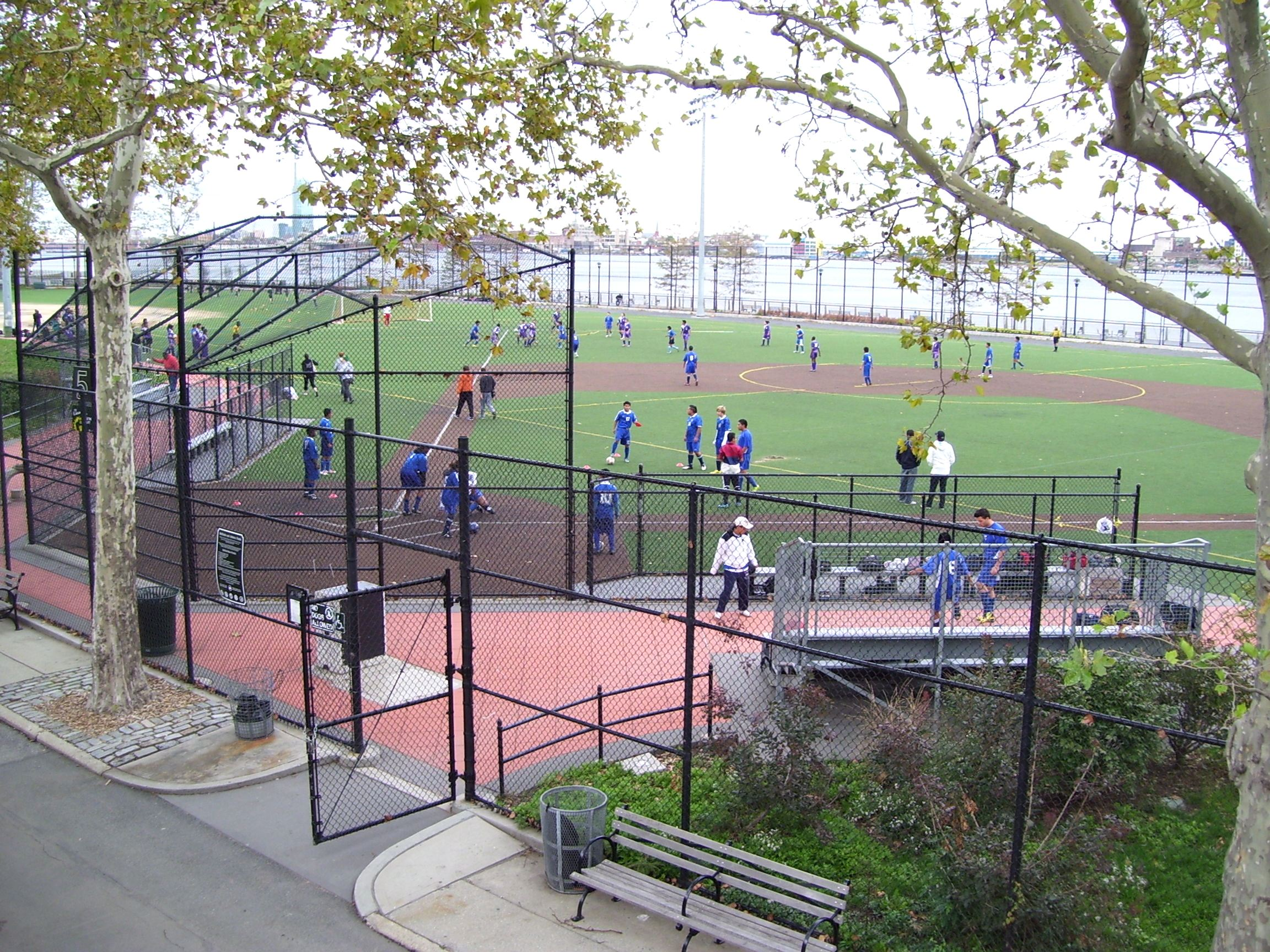
The park had numerous athletic facilities, for baseball, football, soccer, basketball, tennis, and running (Photo from 2010 most demolished except landmarked building)

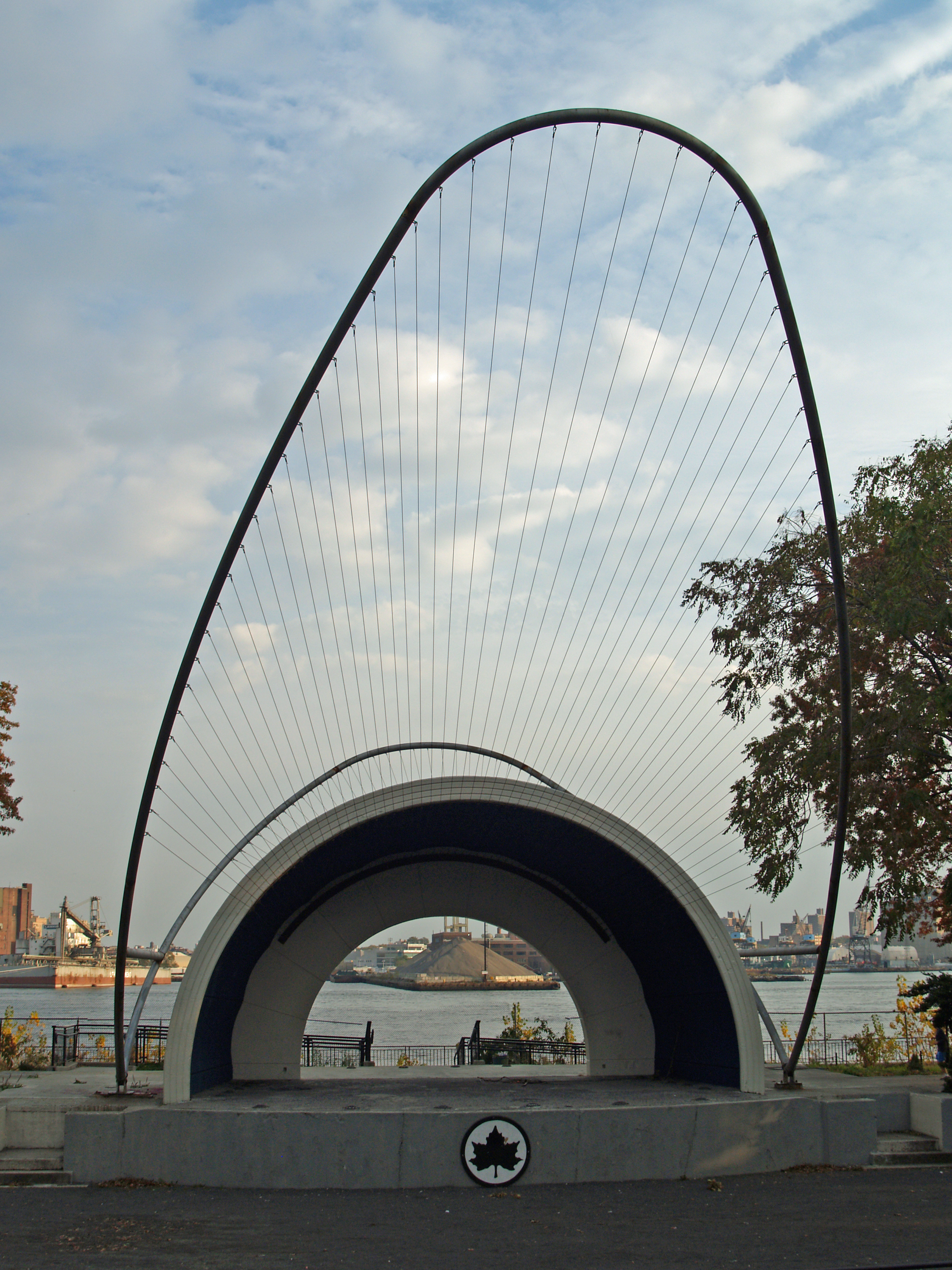
The amphitheater (now demolished) in fall 2008

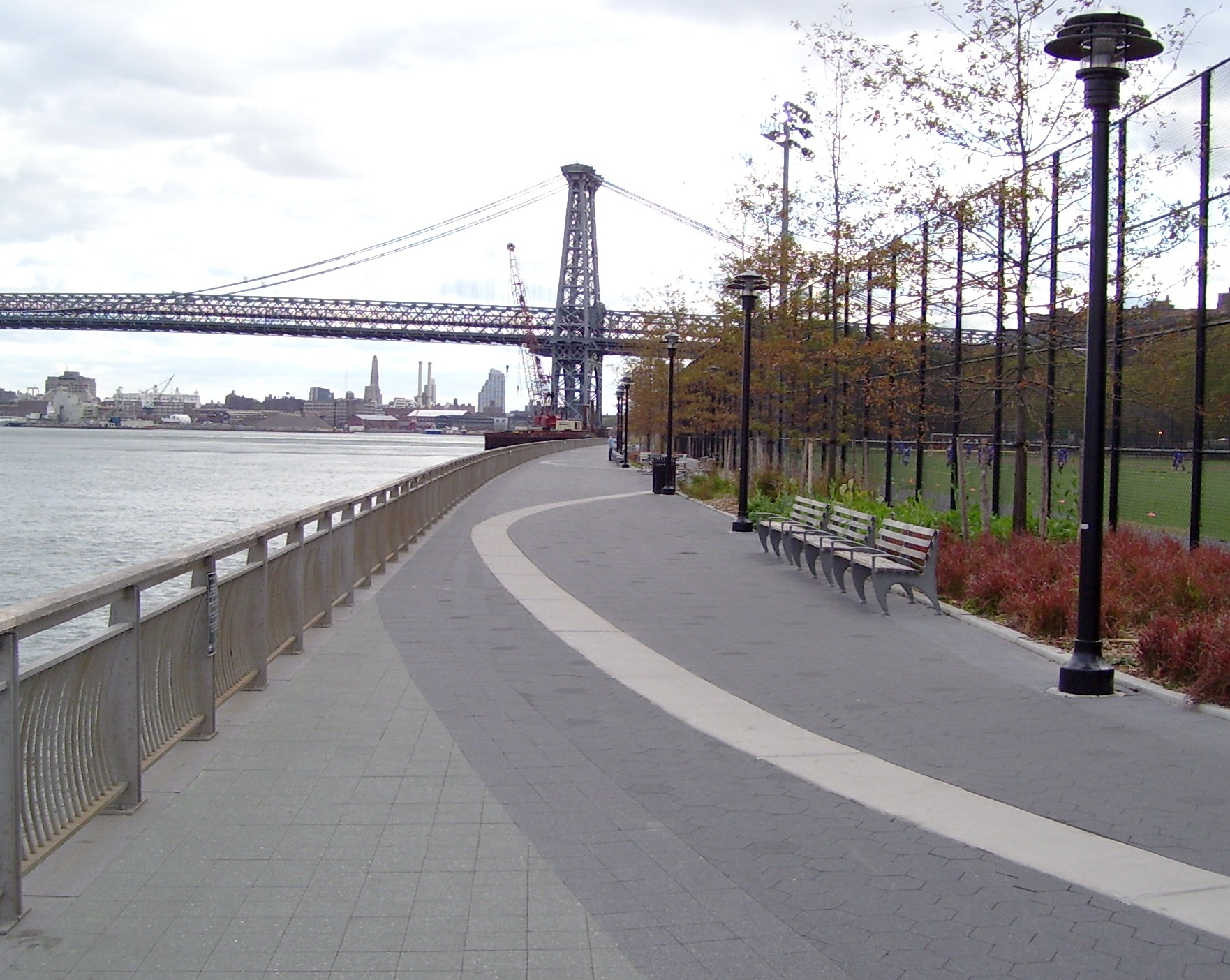
The promenade along the East River opened in 2010; the Williamsburg Bridge is in the background

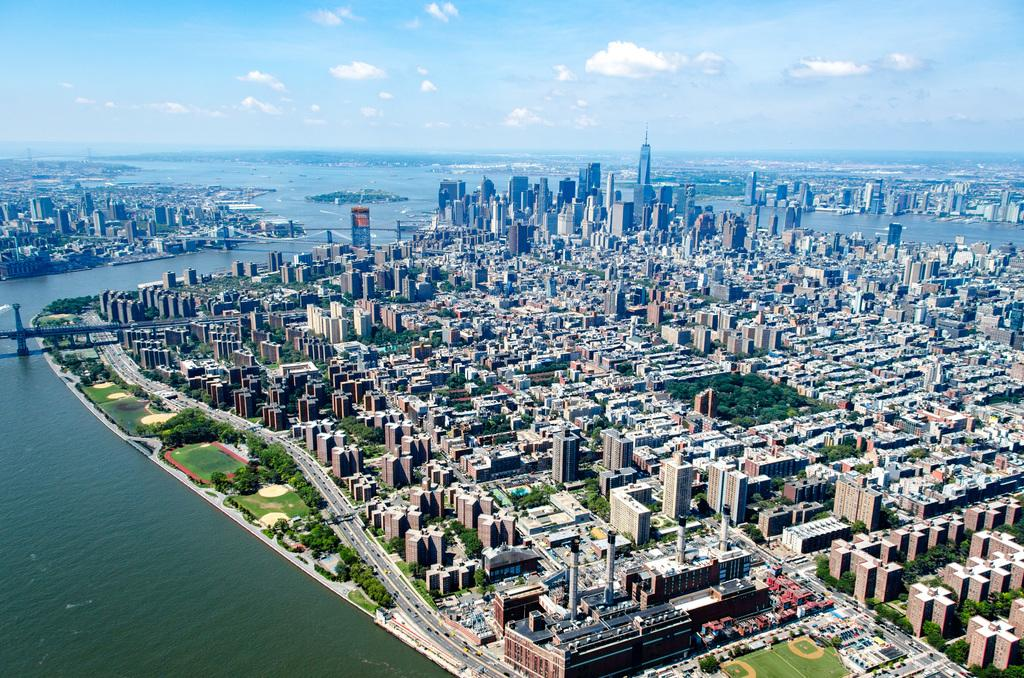
Aerial view of East River Park in 2017

== See also ==
- List of New York City parks
- East River Esplanade
