= Sawing-off of Manhattan Island =

Purported 19th century hoax

The sawing-off of Manhattan Island is a largely-unverified urban legend about Manhattan Island in New York City. It describes a practical joke allegedly perpetrated in 1824, by a retired ship carpenter named Lozier. According to the story, in the 1820s a rumor began circulating among city merchants that the weight of the urban district was causing the southern section of Manhattan Island to sink, near the Battery. It was believed that by cutting the island, towing it out, rotating it 180 degrees, and putting it back in place that Manhattan would be stabilized, and that the thin part of the island could be condemned. The main concern was not the futility of the idea but of Long Island's being in the way. Lozier finally assembled a large workforce and logistical support. At a massive groundbreaking ceremony, Lozier did not show up, but hid in Brooklyn and did not return for months.

The story did not appear in any known newspapers (although the press supposedly did not report on such pranks in that era) and no records have been found to confirm the existence of the individuals involved. This has led to speculation that the incident never occurred and the original report of the hoax was itself a hoax, which is the conclusion Joel Rose suggests in his book, New York Sawed in Half: An Urban Historical (2001). The hoax was first documented in Thomas F. De Voe's (1811–1892) volume The Market Book (1862), as conveyed by his uncle who was Lozier's supposed associate, and was told again in Herbert Asbury's work All Around The Town: Murder, Scandal, Riot and Mayhem in Old New York (1934, reissued as a Sequel to Gangs of New York). Another condensed retelling occurs in the 1960s Reader's Digest book, Scoundrels and Scallywags: 51 Stories of the Most Fascinating Characters of Hoax and Fraud (1968).

== See also ==
- Lower Manhattan expansion
