= Louis Sarowsky =

American skateboarder & artist

Louis Sarowksy, also known as Lurker Lou, is a goofy footed American skateboarder and artist from Dennis Port, Cape Cod, Massachusetts.

== Skateboarding ==
Lurker Lou Sarowksy is known for skating unique and difficult spots.

Skate video Parts & Appearances	Year
Vicious Cycle	2004
Louis	2006
MCVX #2	2012
Orchard Stone Soup	2014
4K Skateboarding in NYC	2016
Purple Shoe Lou	2019

== Art ==
Sarowksy is an artist who often uses recycled materials in his sculptural practice including skateboard decks and other used skateboarding related materials. In 2019–2020, Sarowksy was awarded a residency at the Gowanus E-Waste Warehouse where he used the recycled electronic waste the center collects in his artwork, making sculptures and doing performances, often involving skateboarding and skateboarding materials.

Louis Sarowsky performing at Gowanus E-Waste recycling center on his skateboard

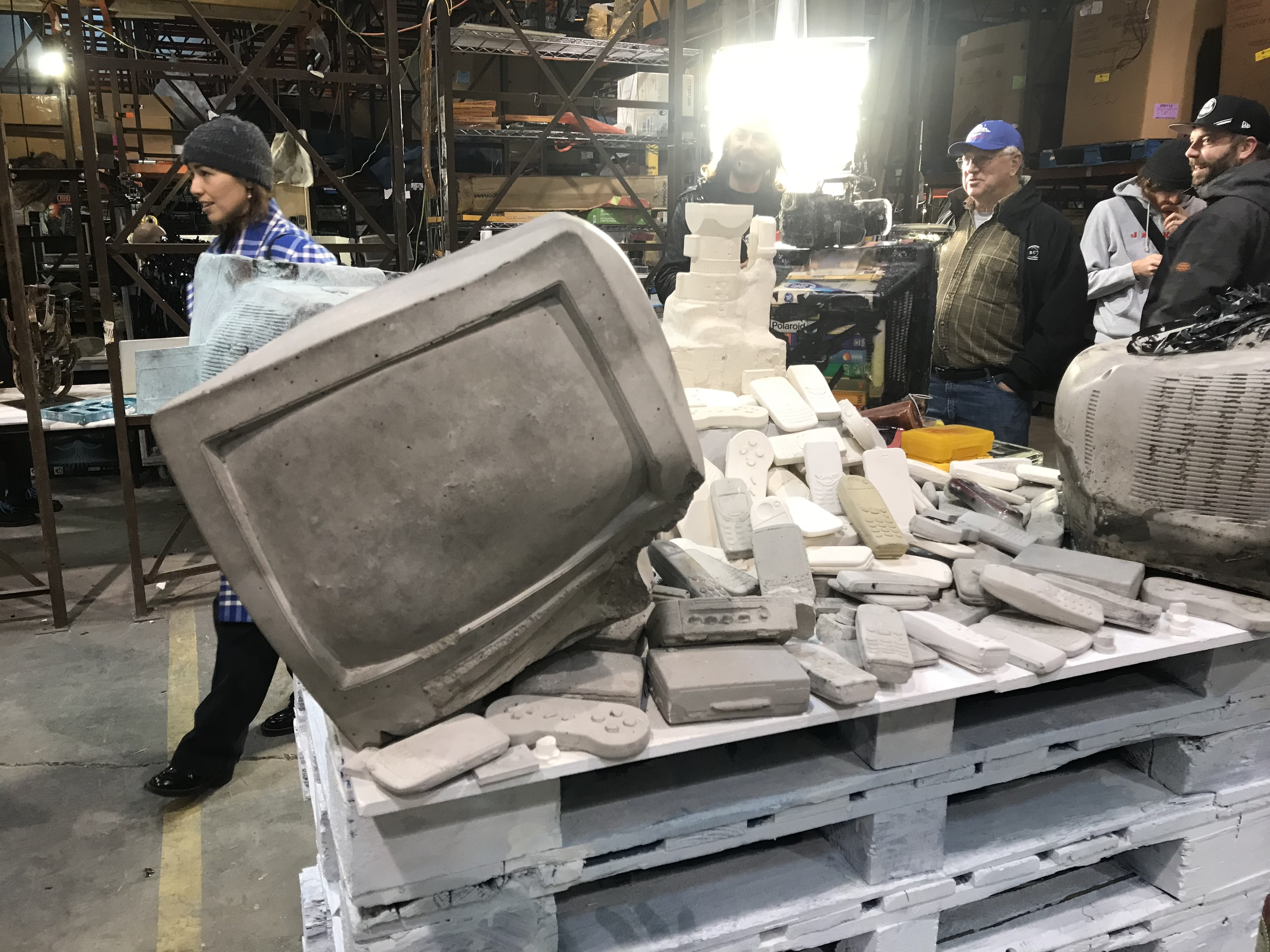
Sculptures by Lou at his opening at the Gowanus E-Waste recycling center - 2020
