= Lower East Side Ecology Center =

Lower East Side Ecology Center, also known as the LES Ecology Center, is an environmental organization founded in 1987, focusing on urban sustainability, providing e-waste and composting services, environmental stewardship opportunities, and educational programming.

== E-Waste Warehouse ==
In 2003, the Ecology Center started its Electronic Waste (E-Waste) Program focusing on E-waste recycling.

=== Artists-in-residence ===
The E-Waste Warehouse hosts one artist in residence at a time. The artist-in-residence is given studio space in the warehouse and is invited to engage and make art with some of the e-waste the center collects. In 2019–2020, skateboarder and artist Louis Sarowsky was an artist-in-residence at the center. He used the recycled materials in his sculptures and performances, making a body-suit covered in VHS tape.

=== E-Waste Warehouse Gallery ===
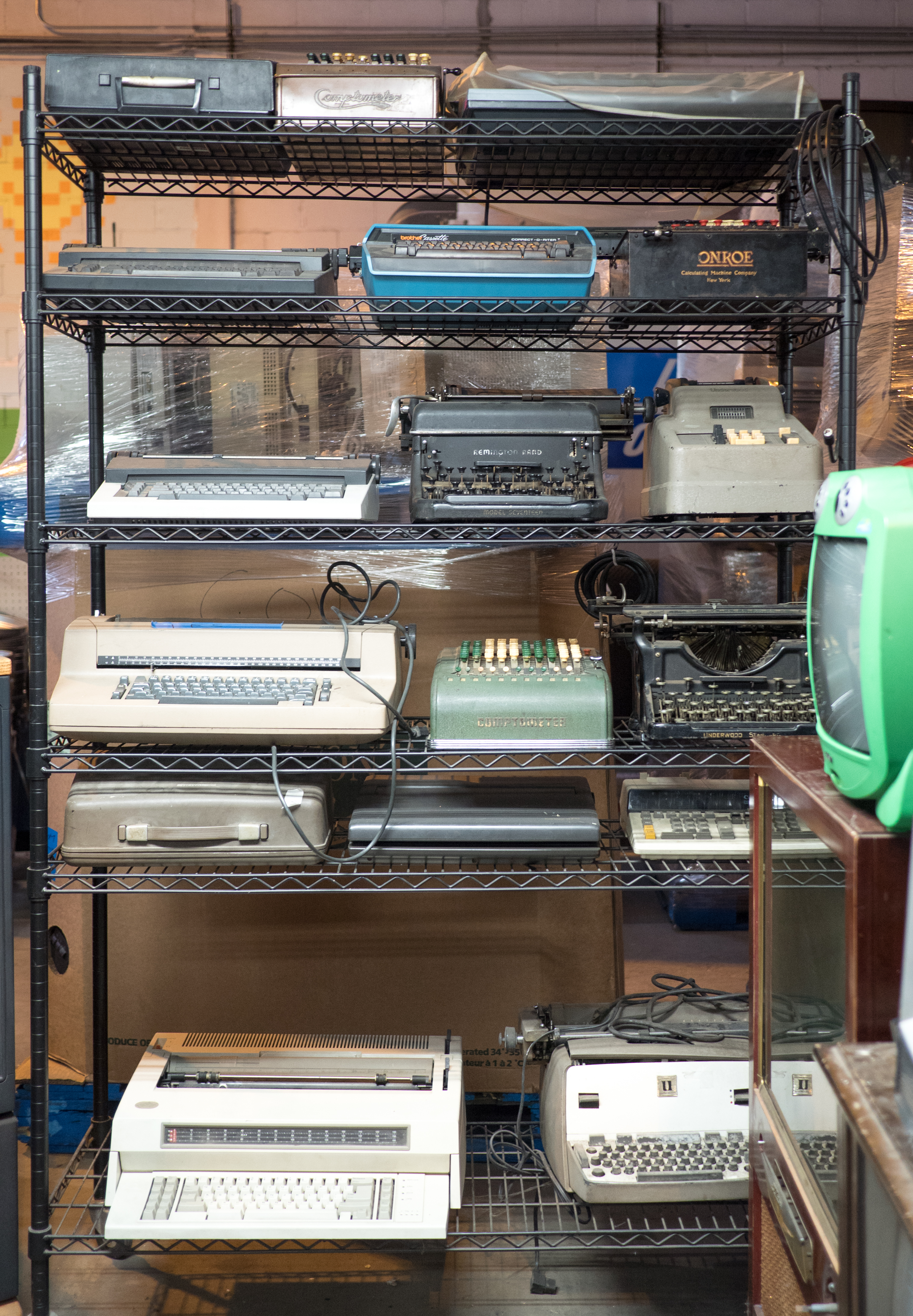
E-Waste Warehouse

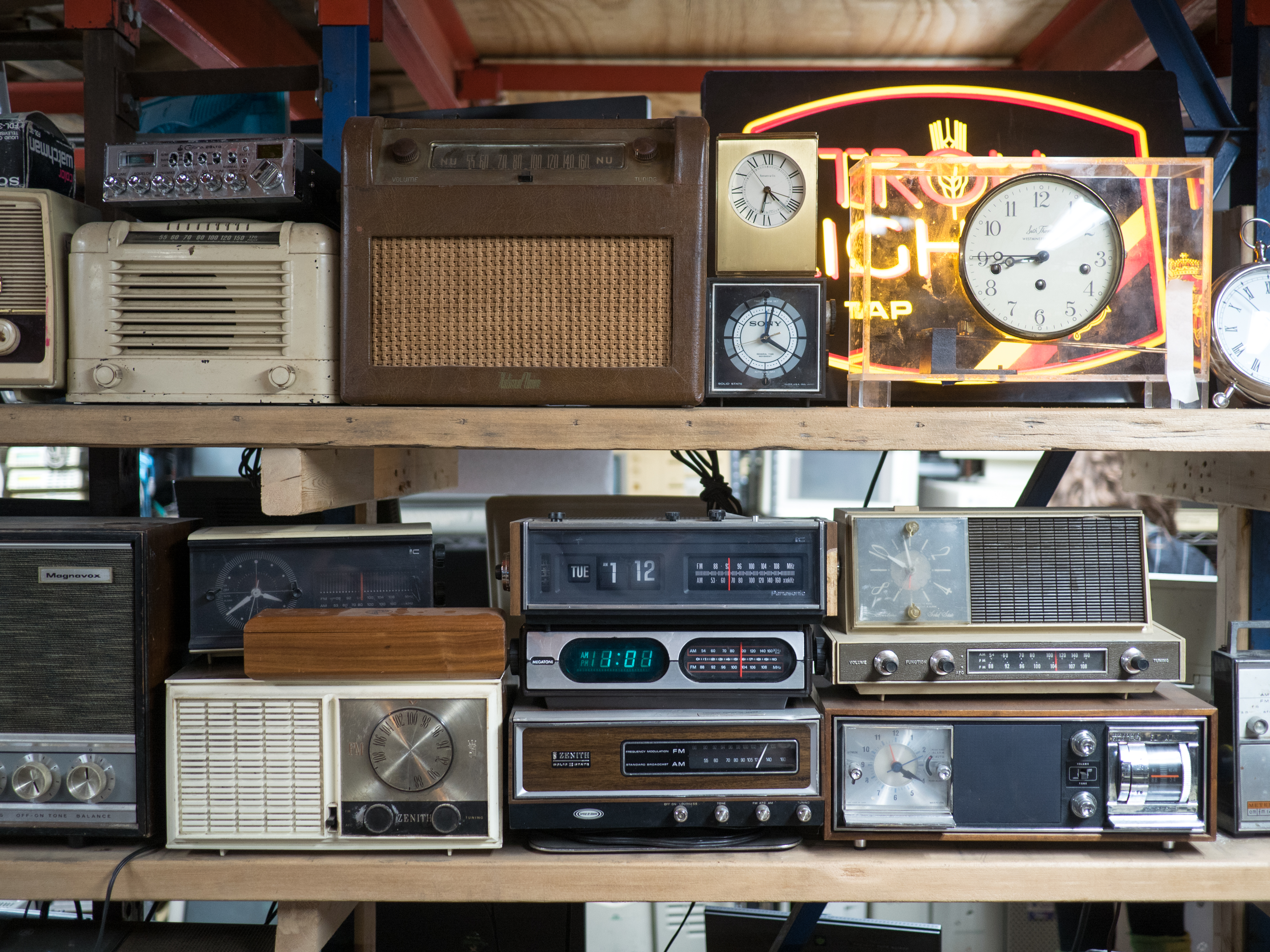
E-Waste Warehouse

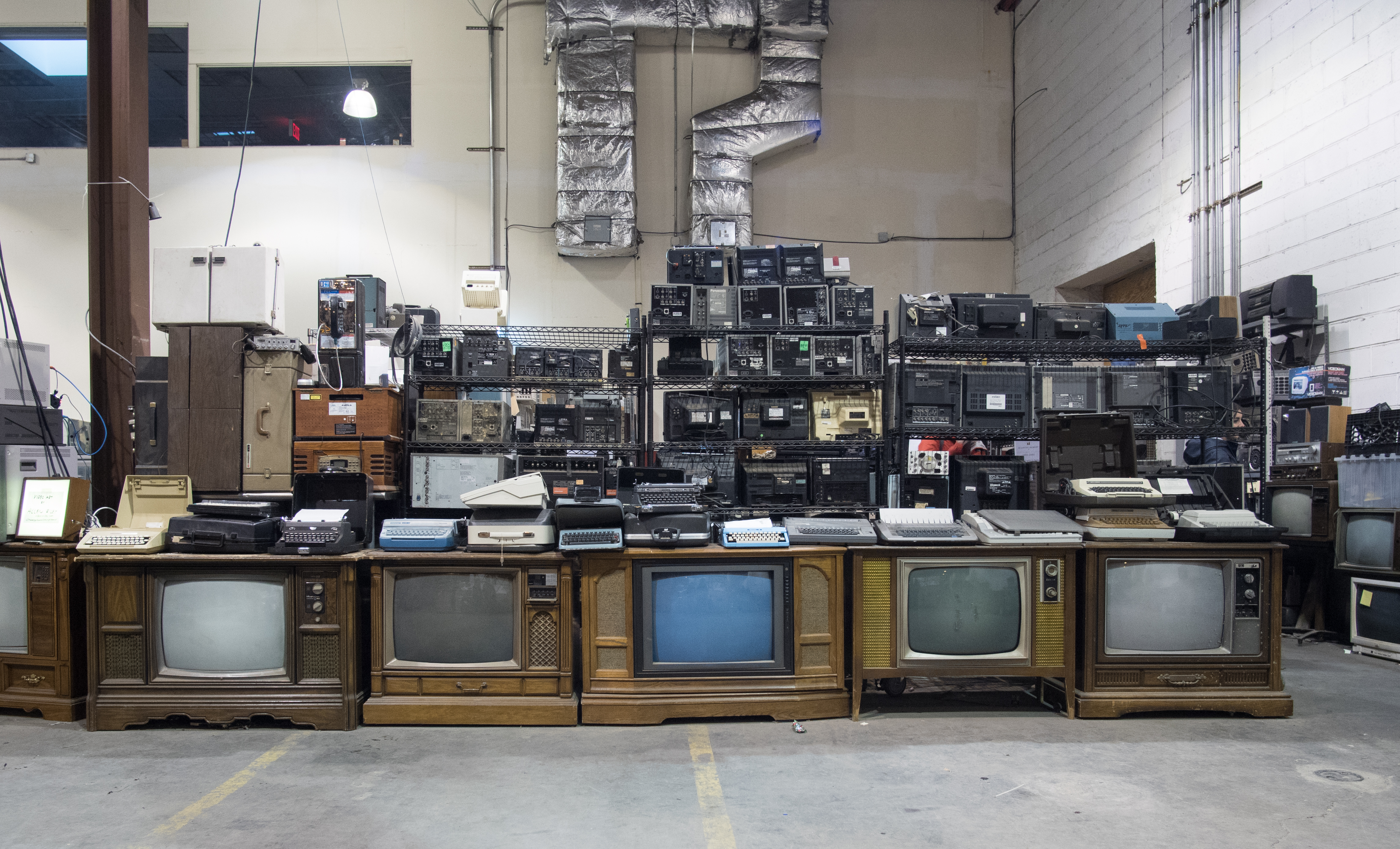
E-Waste Warehouse

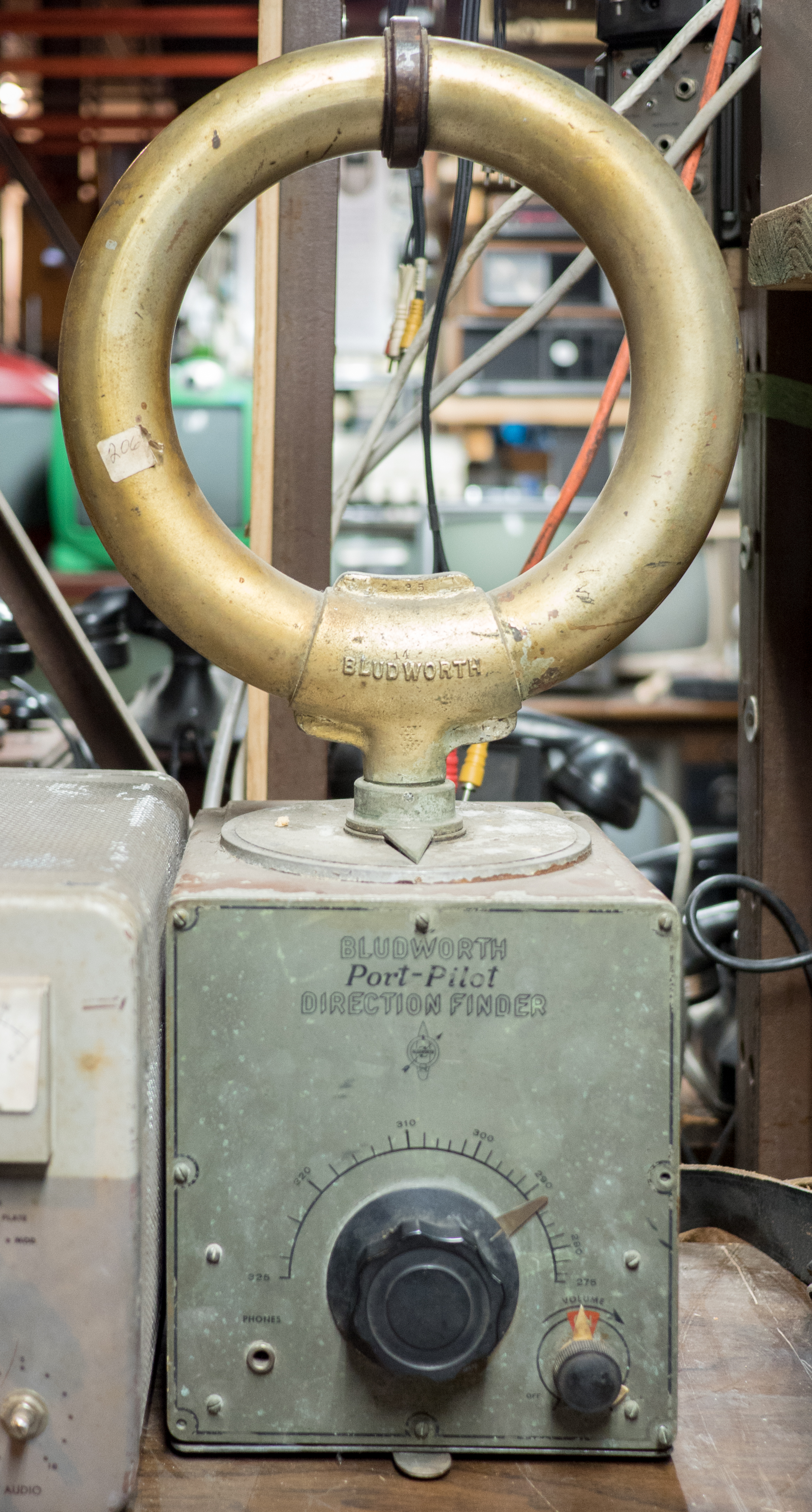
E-Waste Warehouse

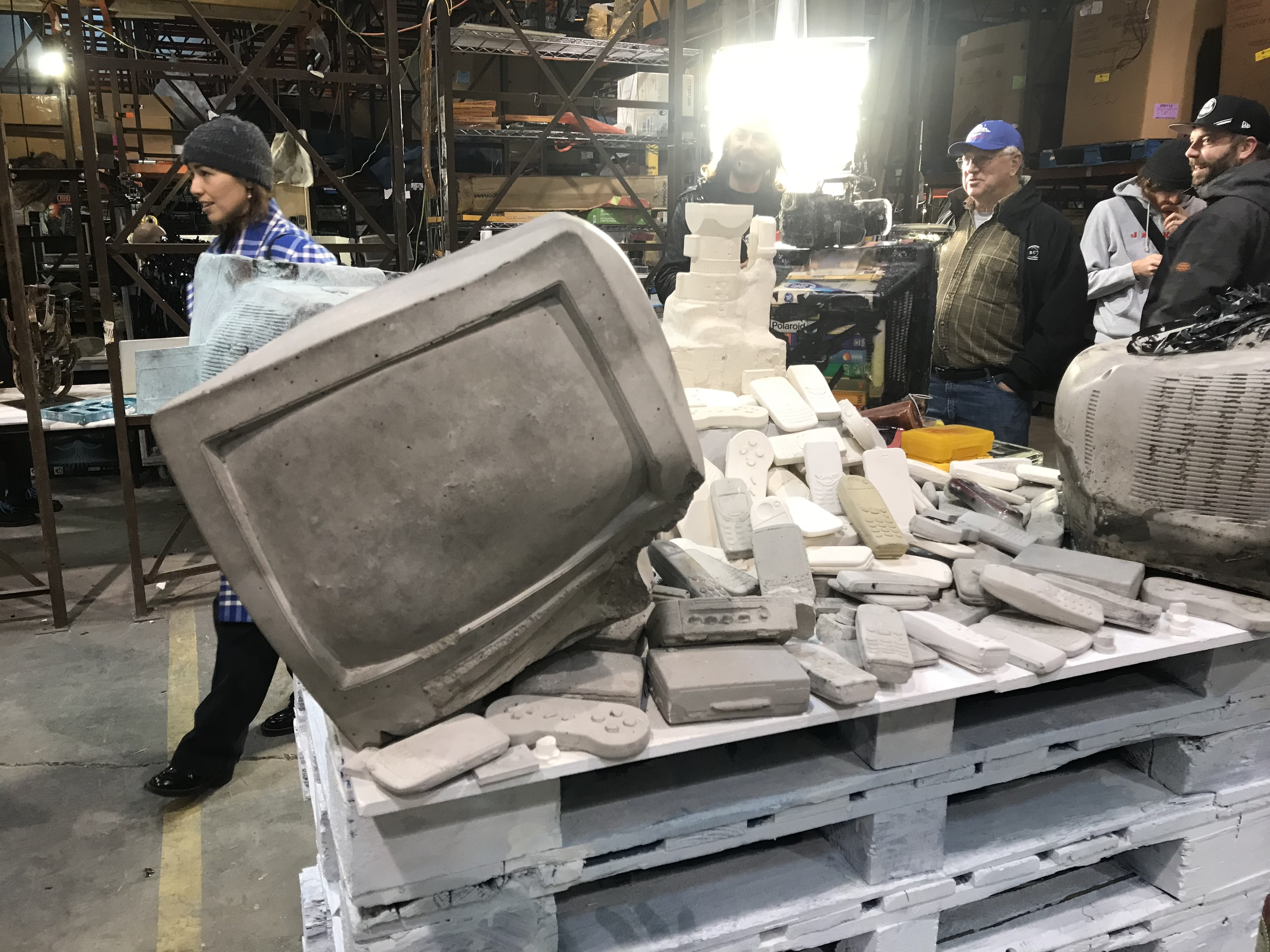
Louis Sarowsky show: “Waste Not Want Not” at E-Waste Warehouse - 2020

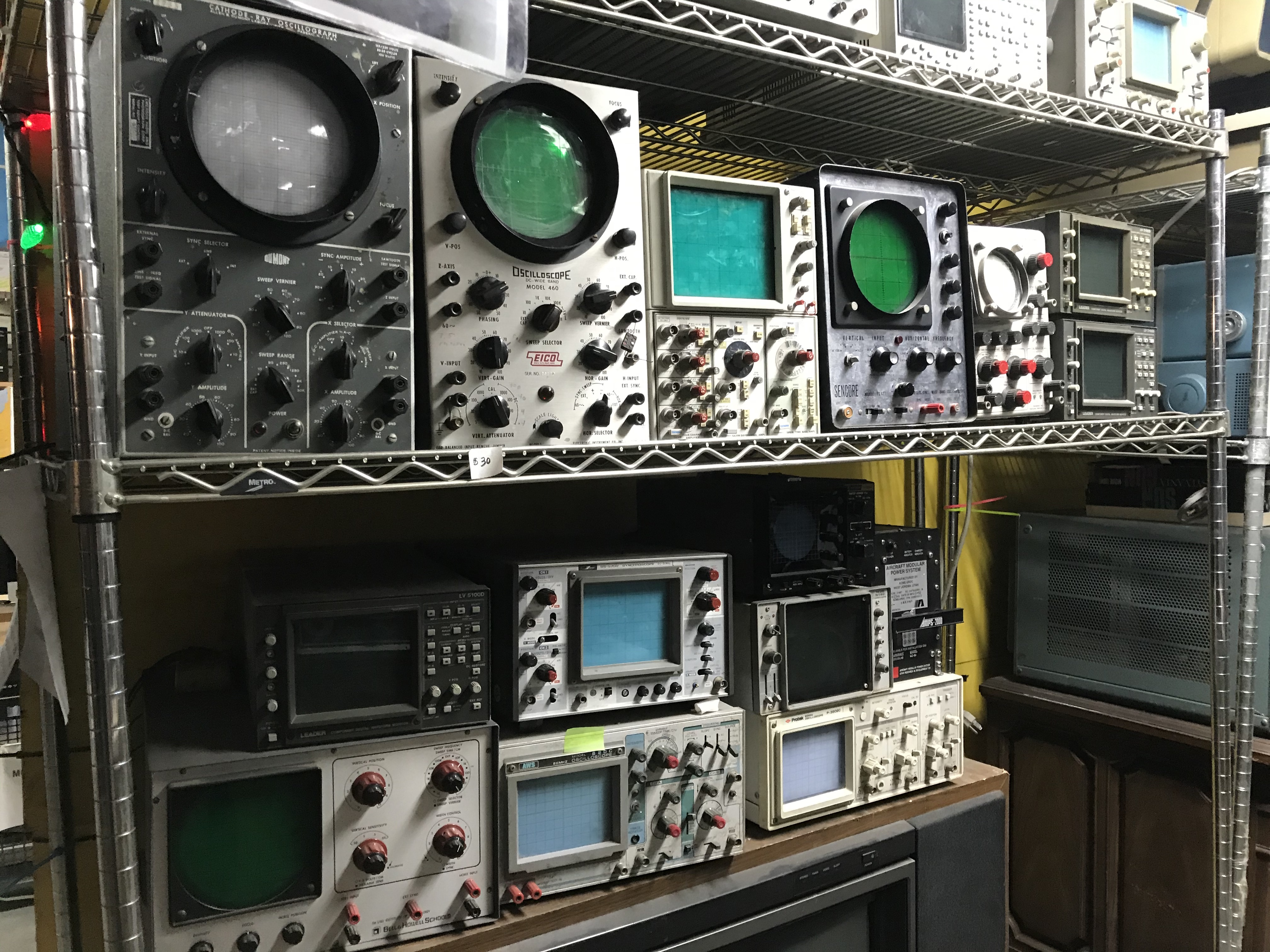
E-Waste Warehouse
