= Buono Beach =

Public beach in Staten Island, New York

Coordinates: 40°36′56.5″N 74°03′46.5″W

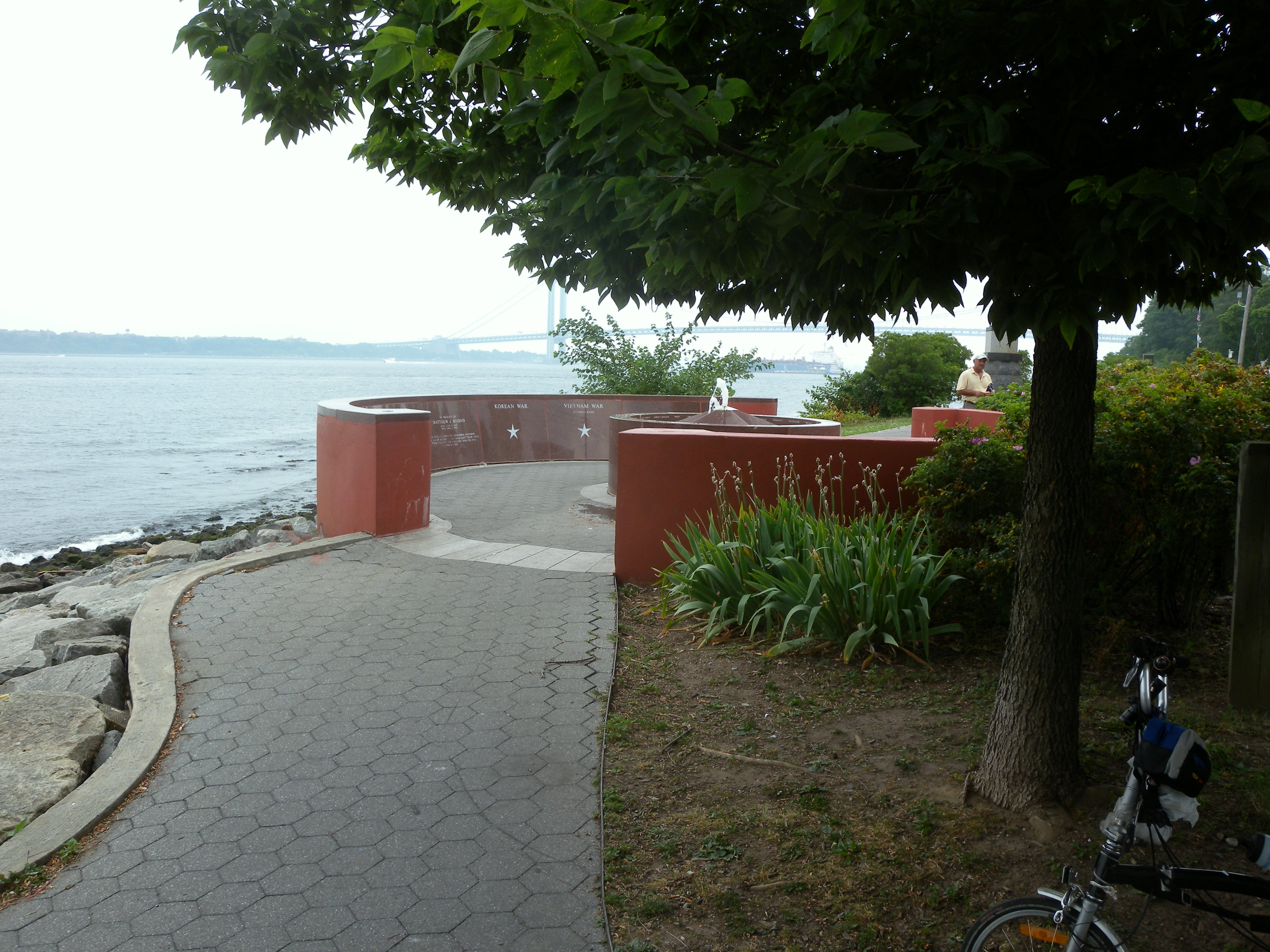
Fountain

Buono Beach is a small shorefront public park in the New York City borough of Staten Island, in the neighborhood of Rosebank, at the foot of Hylan Boulevard. Buono Beach borders New York Harbor and is adjacent to the park containing the Alice Austen House. The park contains a local veterans' memorial fountain.

Buono Beach was named after Matthew "Giggy" Buono, a South Beach resident and graduate of New Dorp High School who died in the Vietnam War.

Prior to its renaming in 1988, Buono Beach was called Penny Beach. Although the origin of that name is unknown, the New York City Department of Parks and Recreation surmises that the beach was named for either the original name of Hylan Boulevard (Pennsylvania Avenue), or because the beach was once a "lovers' lane" where couples would toss coins into the harbor while making wishes.

The park was damaged by Superstorm Sandy in 2012, and a large section of the park along Edgewater Street was closed for several years due to damage, but it reopened in 2016.
