= Hylan Boulevard =

Boulevard in Staten Island, New York

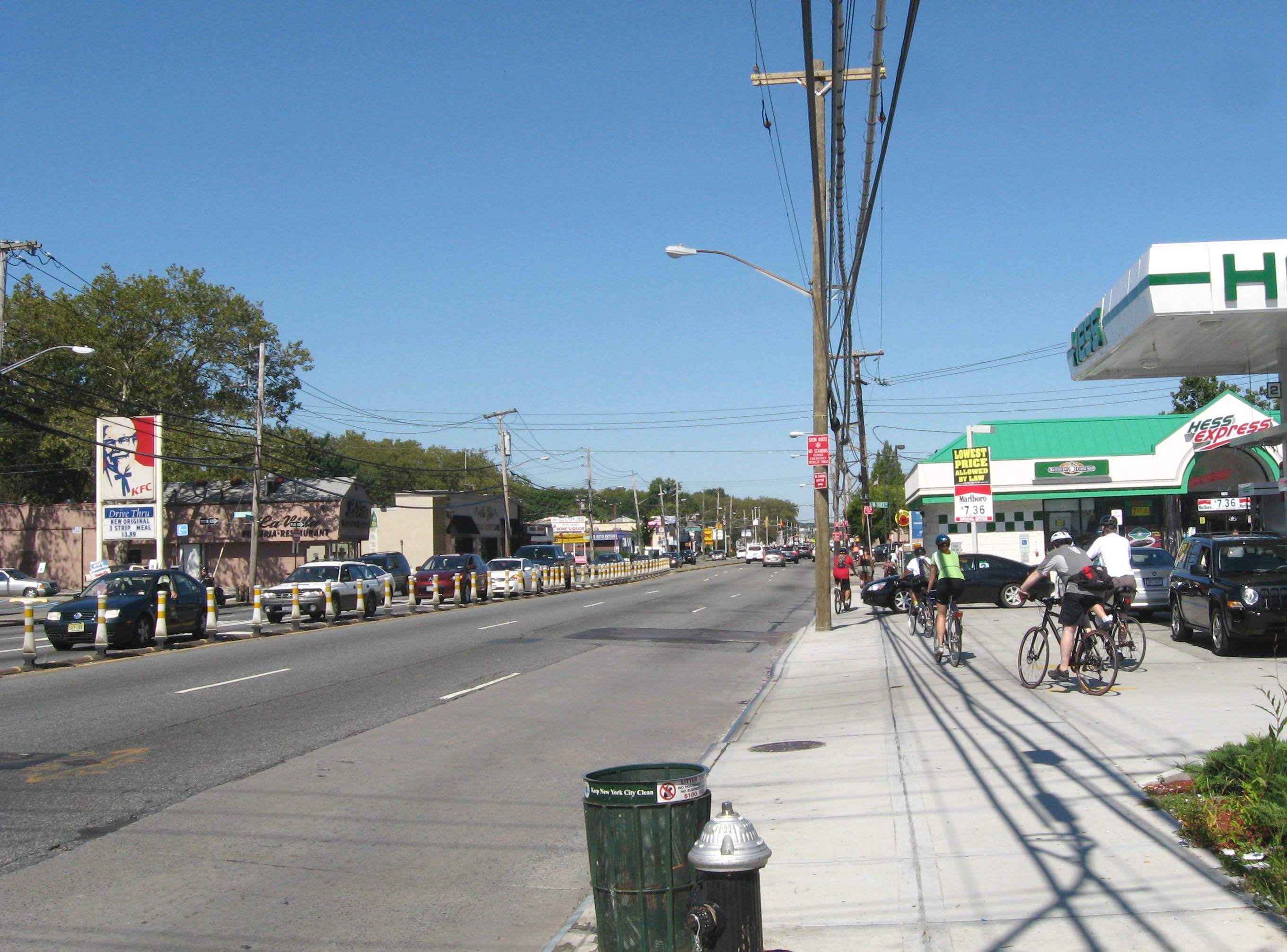
- Looking north in New Dorp
- Former names: Southfield Boulevard, Pennsylvania Avenue
- Namesake: John Francis Hylan
- Owner: City of New York
- Maintained by: NYCDOT
- Length: 13.86 mi (22.31 km)
- Location: Staten Island, New York
- Coordinates: 40°32′45.06″N 74°8′31.63″W
- South end: Satterlee Street in Tottenville
- Major junctions: I-278 in Concord
- North end: Edgewater Street in Shore Acres

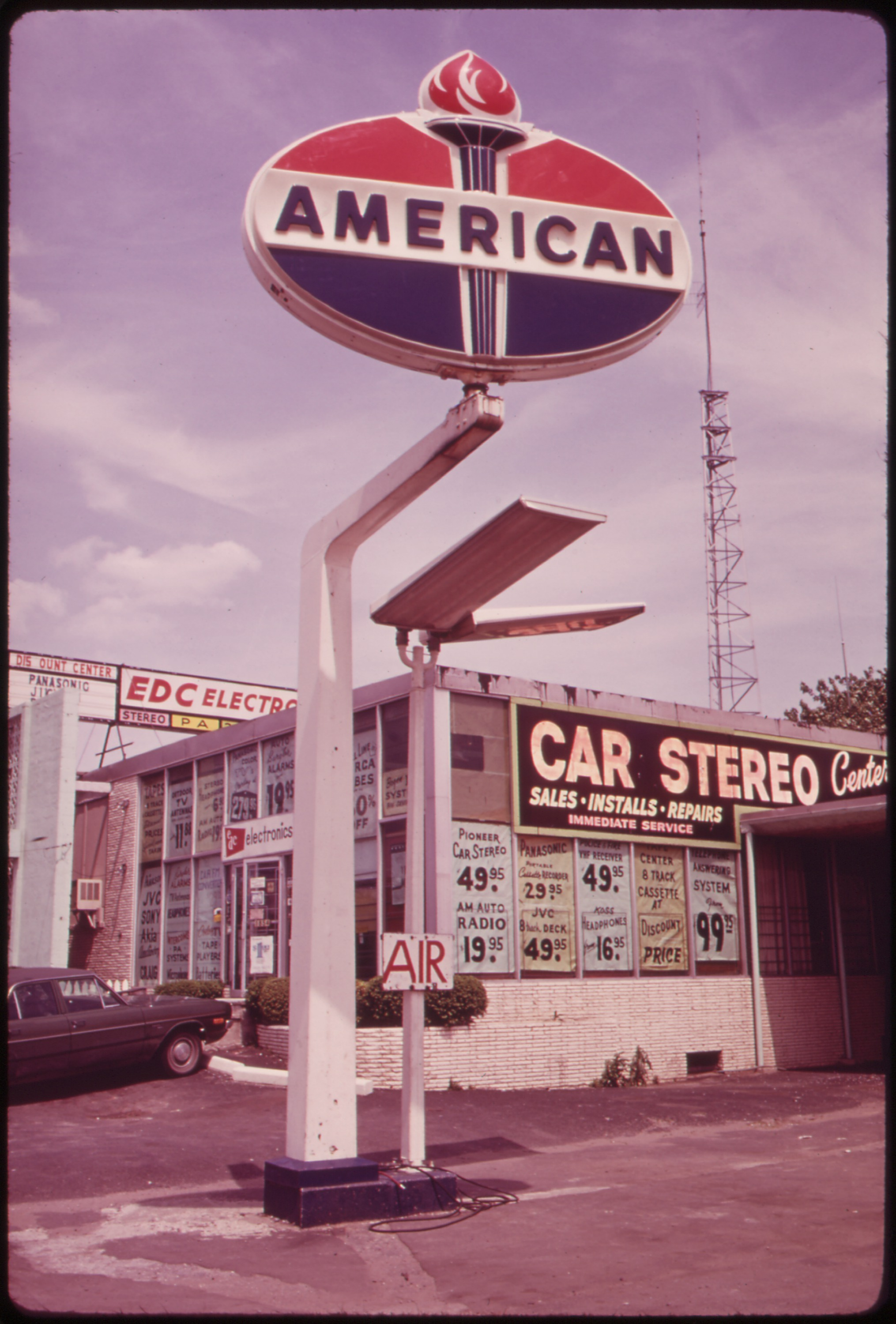
On Hylan Boulevard, 1973. Photo by Arthur Tress.

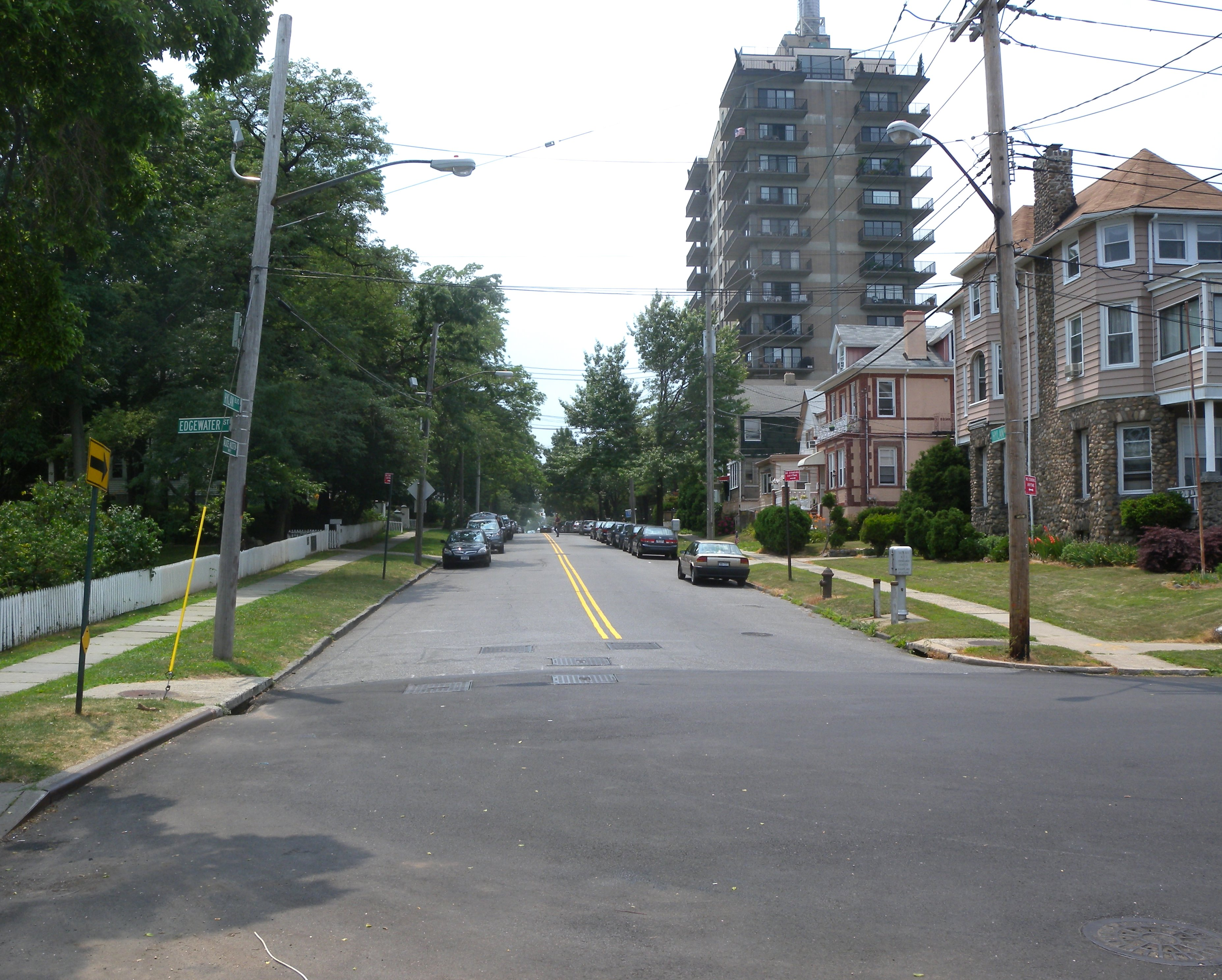
Northeast end, adjacent to the Alice Austen House

Hylan Boulevard is a major northeast–southwest boulevard in the New York City borough of Staten Island, and the longest street in a single borough in the city. It is approximately 14 miles (23 km) long, and runs from the North Shore neighborhood of Rosebank, by the Alice Austen House, then it moves south along the entire East Shore, to the South Shore neighborhood of Tottenville, where it ends at Conference House Park. It was renamed in 1923 for New York City mayor John F. Hylan, before which it was known as Southfield Boulevard and the northern segment as Pennsylvania Avenue.

Hylan Boulevard is one of Staten Island's busiest thoroughfares, carrying over 44,000 vehicles per day. At points the throughfare carries four lanes of regular car traffic, and two lanes of bus traffic. The increased volume of traffic, built up over decades of urbanization due to the construction of the Verrazano Bridge, has resulted in the road becoming New York City's newest Boulevard of Death according to Transportation Alternatives.

== Route description ==
Hylan Boulevard begins at Alice Austen House at the southeast end of Edgewater Street in Rosebank, its first major intersection coming at 0.2 miles (0.3 km), with Bay Street. It becomes divided by street markings at Tompkins Avenue, but then splits at 0.8 miles (1.3 km) and crosses the Staten Island Expressway over two separate overpasses. Upon merging again, it becomes Steuben Street, and Hylan Boulevard continues east of there, snaking further through the neighborhood of Arrochar. Steuben joins Hylan again at 2.0 miles (3.2 km). Half a mile later, Hylan intersects with Old Town Road and Quintard Street, at which point it begins a predominantly straight southwesterly run. Major intersections following include Seaview Avenue (3.2 miles) and Midland Avenue (4.0 miles). At 4.6 miles (7.4 km), Hylan intersects with New Dorp Lane at what is known to be one of Staten Island's worst intersections in terms of traffic and collisions. Continuing southwest from there, it intersects Tysens Lane (5.2 miles), reverse-curves at approximately 5.6 miles (9.0 km), and then continues straight southwest again past Great Kills Park. Major intersections include Buffalo Street (6.1 miles) and Nelson Avenue (7.5 miles). At 8.2 miles (13.2 km), Hylan intersects with Richmond Avenue, another major Island thoroughfare. Continuing, the last portion of divided roadway ends at Arden Avenue (8.7 miles), and the boulevard continues westward through the neighborhoods of the South Shore, ending at Conference House Park in Tottenville.

== Attractions ==
As an integral artery of Staten Island, Hylan Boulevard is a commercial corridor and a heavily trafficked roadway. At the northernmost end is Buono Beach, a small park with views of New York Harbor, as well as the Alice Austen House, the historical home of native Island photographer Alice Austen and one of the few remaining Dutch Colonial structures on the Island.

Commercial establishments of various kinds line the boulevard's north-central stretch, with larger shopping centers in and around the New Dorp neighborhood. At Buffalo Street is the entrance to Great Kills Park, part of the larger Gateway National Recreation Area. In the neighborhood of Great Kills there are more businesses, but south of Richmond Avenue, the boulevard is almost entirely residential or parkland.

== History ==
The road was part of the Jersey Coast Highway, running from the Staten Island Ferry's St. George Terminal to Cape May, New Jersey.

In 2022, Hylan Boulevard was subject to a road diet by the NYCDOT, reducing the car lanes from four to two lanes, and adding two bicycle lanes south of Page Avenue.

== Transportation ==
Hylan Boulevard is served by many MTA NYCT bus routes, both local and express, including service to Brooklyn and Manhattan:

- The primary bus for this corridor is the S78, serving it between Tompkins Avenue, and either Craig Avenue (Bricktown Mall) or Main Street (St. George Ferry), when running the full route. Other buses run between Tompkins Avenue and Richmond or Luten Avenues.
- The S79 SBS (Select Bus Service) runs between Richmond Avenue and Narrows Road, but is absent between Steuben Street and Olga Place.
- From Sand Lane, the S53 heads west to Clove Road, and the S52 heads east to Fingerboard Road.
- All S81 and some S51 buses to Grant City run from Midland to Lincoln Avenues.
- The S57 runs between Guyon Avenue and either Ebbitts Street (New Dorp), or Tysens Lane (Port Richmond).
- Additional weekday service is provided by the S54 between Richmond and Nelson Avenues, the S55 and S56 between Seguine and Luten Avenues, and the S59 until evening between Richmond Avenue and either Craig Avenue (Tottenville), or Main Street (Port Richmond).
- The following express routes provide service on Hylan Boulevard to/from Richmond Avenue:
  - The SIM1, SIM7 and SIM10 head east to Steuben Street, and are joined with the SIM9 west of Midland Avenue, the SIM5 and SIM6 between Nelson and Midland Avenues, and the SIM11 east of Tysens Avenue (Midtown) or Ebbitts Street (New Dorp).
  - The SIM22 is the only express route that heads west from Richmond, terminating at Woods of Arden Road.
- The SIM26 runs between Craig Avenue and either Bedell Avenue (Midtown), or Page Avenue (Tottenville).
- Also from Craig Avenue, the SIM25 heads to Seguine Avenue, while the SIM2 continues to Huguenot Avenue and is joined with the SIM24 at Luten Avenue.
- The SIM23 runs between Poillon and Arden Avenues.

While the current Staten Island Railway never crosses Hylan's path, it largely parallels the boulevard. Many stations along the line are half a mile to a mile and a half (one or two km) further inland, with the closest being the Old Town station. The former South Beach Branch of the railway did cross the boulevard just east of Rosebank station.

== Major intersections ==
The entire route is in the New York City borough of Staten Island.

Location	mi	km	Destinations	Notes
Tottenville	0.00	0.00	Satterlee Street	Conference House Park
Eltingville	5.75	9.25	Richmond Avenue	
Concord	12.46	20.05	Fingerboard Road	To Verrazano Bridge
Concord–Shore Acres line	12.81	20.62	I-278 (Staten Island Expressway) – Goethals Bridge, Verrazano Bridge	Exit 14 on I-278; access via Narrows Road
Rosebank–Shore Acres line	13.86	22.31	Edgewater Street	Buono Beach
1.000 mi = 1.609 km; 1.000 km = 0.621 mi
