= Our Lady of Mount Carmel Grotto =

Historic site in Staten Island, New York

- U.S. National Register of Historic Places
- U.S. Historic district
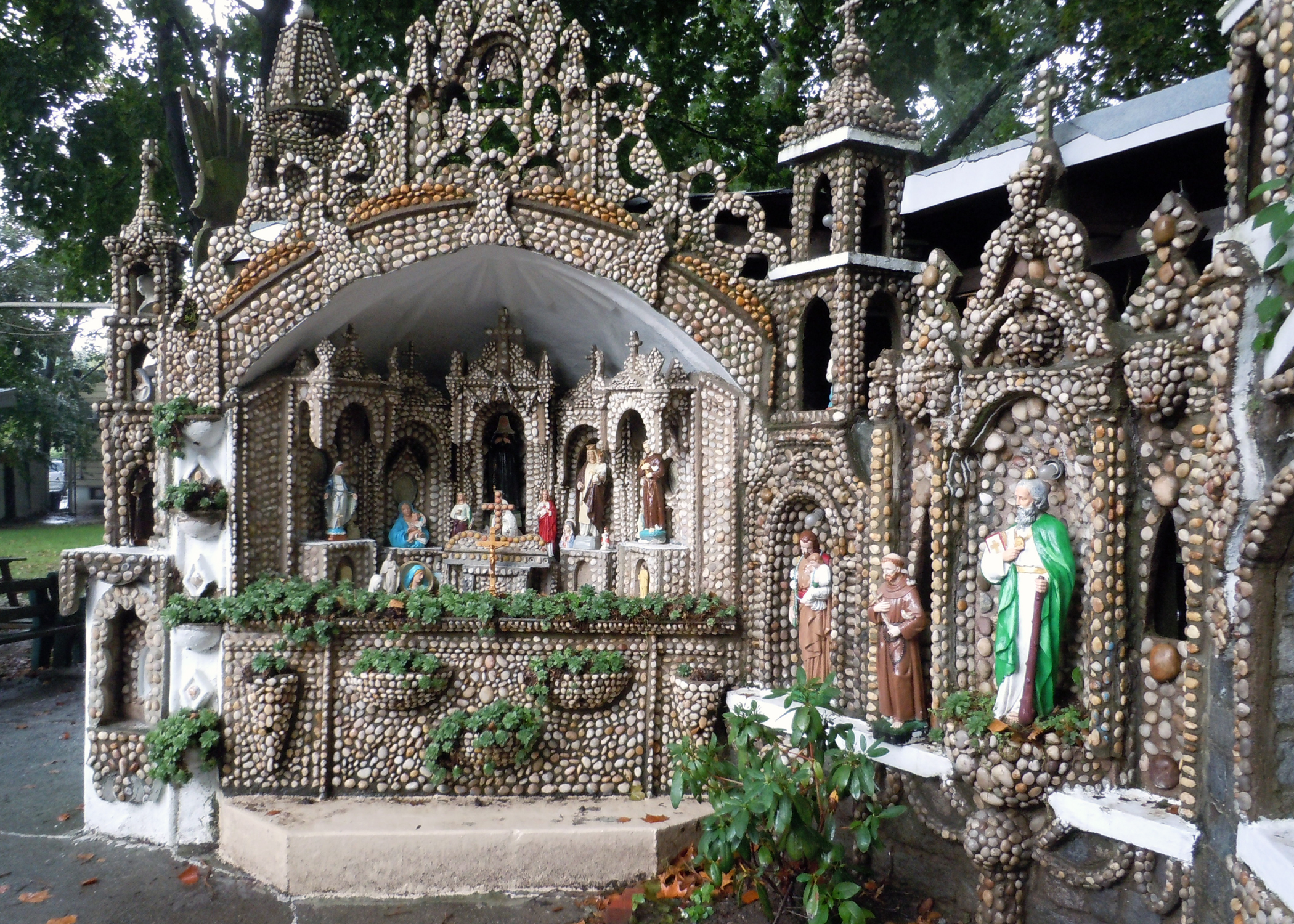
- Our Lady of Mount Carmel Grotto, September 2012

- Location within New York City Location within New York Location within the United States
- Location: 36 Amity St., Staten Island, New York
- Coordinates: 40°36′44″N 74°4′31″W
- Area: less than one acre
- Built: 1937
- Architect: Russo, Vito
- Architectural style: Grotto
- NRHP reference No.: 00001276
- Added to NRHP: November 02, 2000

Our Lady of Mount Carmel Grotto is a national historic district located at 36 Amity Street in Rosebank, Staten Island, New York. It is a historic Roman Catholic grotto designed and constructed by the local Italian American community. Work on the distinctive concrete and stone folk art structure was begun in 1937 and continues to the present. The property includes the grotto, a frame meeting hall dated to about 1920, and contributing landscape features and ancillary structures and objects.

It was added to the National Register of Historic Places in 2000.
