= Alice Austen House =

Historic house in Staten Island, New York

- Elizabeth Alice Austen House; Clear Comfort
- U.S. National Register of Historic Places
- U.S. National Historic Landmark
- New York State Register of Historic Places
- New York City Landmark
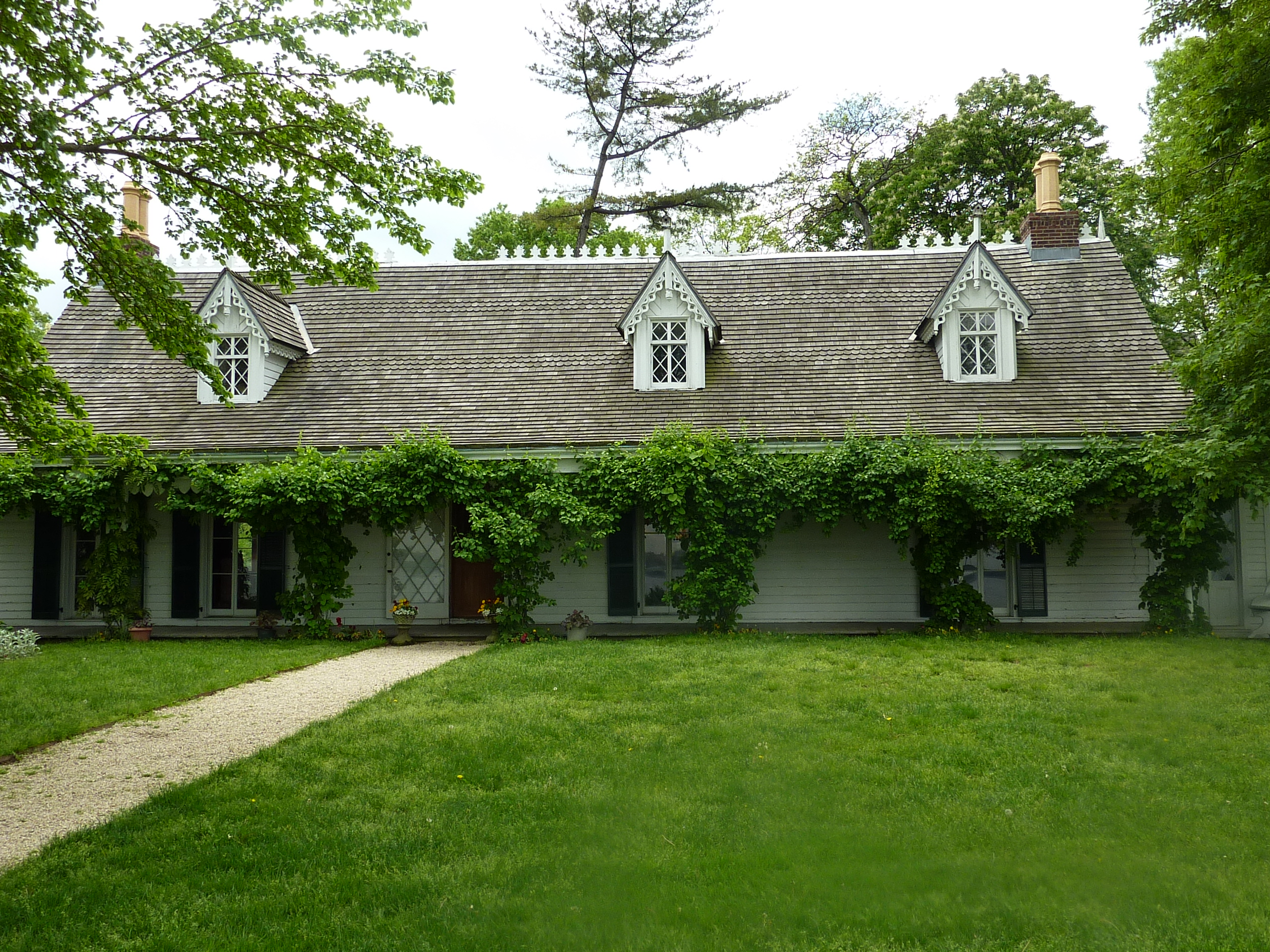

- Location within New York City Location within New York Location within the United States
- Location: 2 Hylan Boulevard; Staten Island; New York City, New York
- Coordinates: 40°36′53.7″N 74°03′49.0″W
- Built: 1690
- Architectural style: Dutch Colonial, later Gothic Revival
- NRHP reference No.: 70000925
- NYSRHP No.: 08501.000264
- NYCL No.: 0371

Significant dates
- Added to NRHP: July 28, 1970
- Designated NHL: April 19, 1993
- Designated NYSRHP: June 23, 1980
- Designated NYCL: August 2, 1967

The Alice Austen House, also known as Clear Comfort, is located at 2 Hylan Boulevard in the Rosebank section of Staten Island, New York City, New York, US. It was home of Alice Austen, a photographer, for most of her lifetime, and is now a museum and a member of the Historic House Trust. The house is administered by the "Friends of Alice Austen", a volunteer group.

In 2021, Clear Comfort was documented by the LGBT Historic Sites project, the first NYC site dedicated to a woman to be so recognized.

== History ==
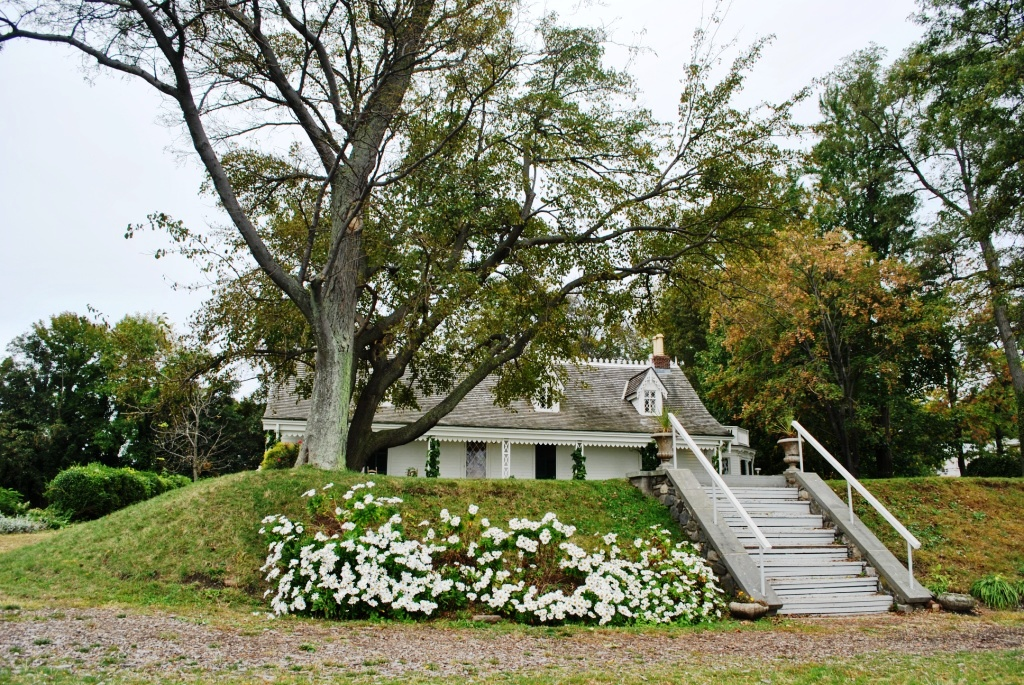
View of the house from the beach

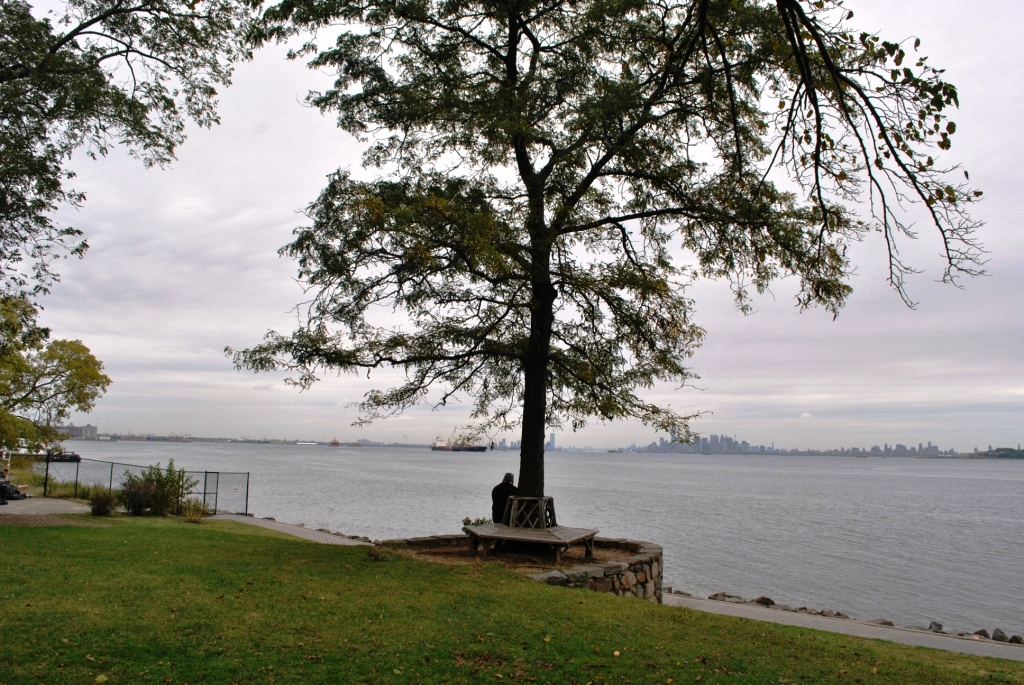
View over New York Bay

It was originally built in the 1690s/early 1700s as a one-room Dutch Colonial House on the shore of New York Harbor, near the Narrows with brothers Jacob, Lambert and John Woulter/Johnson being the likely first occupants. The brothers Johnson purchased 120 acres of land from George Brown in 1698. Jacob Johnson's mother-in-law was Winifred King Benham, who was tried for witchcraft in Wallingford, Connecticut, and may have been a resident of the house after her acquittal and virtual banishment.

The house was remodeled and expanded several times in the 1800s, most notably after John Haggerty Austen, Alice's grandfather, purchased, renamed, and remodeled it in 1844.

In the 1950s and 1960s, photographers Berenice Abbott and Philip Johnson led a group of historic preservationists to save the house from being demolished. It was added to the National Register of Historic Places in 1970 and became a New York City Landmark in 1971. It was purchased by New York City in 1975 and opened to the public in 1985. In 1993 it became a National Historic Landmark, and in 2002, it became a Historic Artist Home and Studio.

== Museum special exhibitions and activities ==
Alice Austen House participates as a museum in the Smithsonian program of Museum Day events. In 2016 Austen House presented its first juried triennial exhibition, Staten Island Unlimited featuring 35 photographers from three boroughs of New York. During the members' preview reception of the show, a toast was made to Alice Austen's 150th birthday. Other activities included Triennial Talks, discussions with artists about their work on the subjects of "Staten Island as Place" and "Staten Island as Community."

In March 2016, the Whitney Museum hosted New Eyes on Alice Austen, a panel discussion in honor of Women's History Month and Alice Austen's 150th birthday featuring "scholars, academics, and historians who have investigated her incredible work and unconventional lifestyle." This was part of the museum's re-interpretation to include Gertrude Tate, Austen's long time life partner. This also includes a new podcast, My Dear Alice. The house is an example of an LGBT site on the National Register of Historic Places.

== Alleged haunting ==
An old neighborhood tradition told that, after midnight, one could hear the clanking of chains coming from the cellar. This was attributed to the ghosts of slaves who were kept there during the American Revolution. Another apocryphal story is that of a British soldier hanging himself from a beam in the parlor because of a broken heart. It is said that the sound of his military boots and the clinking of his spurs may be heard in that room after midnight.

== See also ==
- List of museums devoted to one photographer
- List of the oldest buildings in New York
- List of New York City Designated Landmarks in Staten Island
