= Alice Austen =

American photographer (1866–1952)

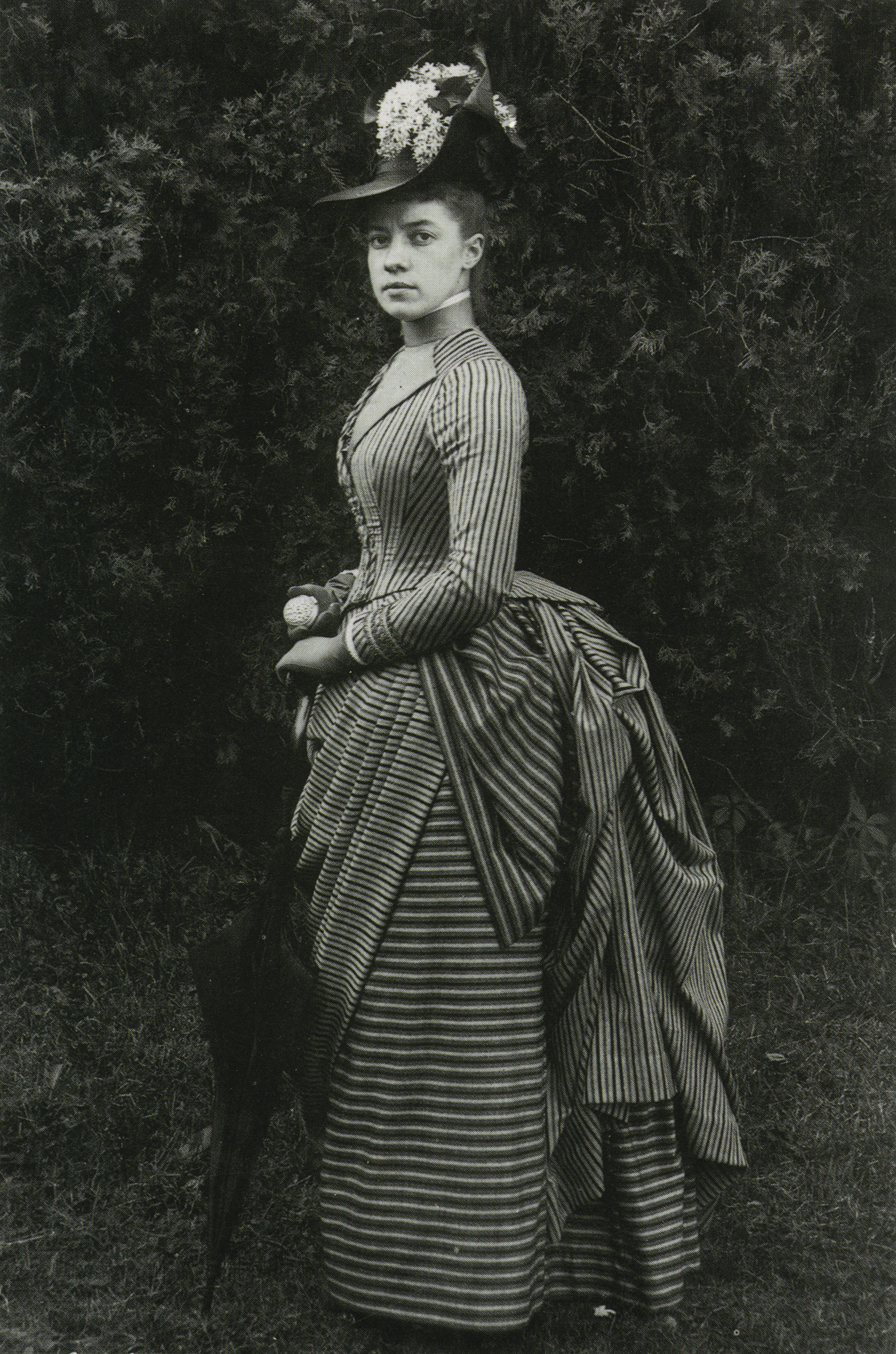
- Austen at Clear Comfort, c. 1888
- Born: Elizabeth Alice Munn; March 17, 1866; Rosebank, New York, US
- Died: June 9, 1952 (aged 86); Staten Island, New York, US
- Resting place: Moravian Cemetery
- Occupation: Photographer
- Years active: 1880s–1930s
- Partner: Gertrude Amelia Tate (1899–1950~)
- Parent: Alice Cornell Austen (1836–1900)

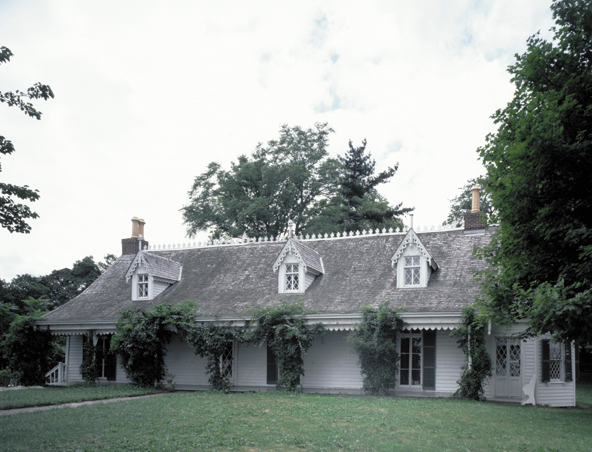
Alice Austen House or Clear Comfort in 2002

Elizabeth Alice Austen (March 17, 1866 – June 9, 1952) was an American photographer working in Staten Island. She is best known for her street photography and her intimate depictions of women's lives and relationships in the Victorian era.

== Biography ==
Alice Austen was born Elizabeth Alice Austen on March 17, 1866, in Rosebank, New York to Alice Cornell Austen and Edward Stopford Munn. Her great-great-grandfather, Peter Townsend, was the owner of Sterling Iron Works famous for forging the Hudson River Chain used to thwart British ships during the American Revolutionary War. Austen's father abandoned the family around 1869, prompting Austen and her mother to move to her family's Victorian Gothic farmhouse, nicknamed Clear Comfort, where they lived with Austen's maternal grandparents, her uncle Oswald Muller - a Danish sea captain, and her aunt and her husband. She was encouraged at a young age to pursue various activities and hobbies, and was first introduced to photography at the age of ten by her uncle Oswald who brought home a camera in 1878.

== Photography ==
Austen was a self-taught photographer, and primarily used photographic plates and a camera manufactured by the Scovill Company. She also meticulously recorded information about her photographs, including the glass plate brand, aperture, and exposure time. Austen used a darkroom, likely designed by her uncle, an amateur photographer and chemistry professor at Rutgers University, and produced over 7,000 photographs up through the 1930s, most notably depicting New York's immigrant populations, the inner lives and activities of Victorian women, and her travels to Europe.

Austen is notable as one of the first female photographers to work outside of a studio and was known to transport up to fifty pounds of camera equipment on her bicycle. Austen considered herself an amateur photographer as she was independently wealthy and typically did not sell her work to support herself. She copyrighted much of her work, though little of it was ever marketed. In 1895, she began work on a portfolio project titled "Street Types of New York" made up of street photography portraits of various tradespeople in working-class neighborhoods in Manhattan. From the mid-1890s to 1912, Austen worked for Alvah H. Doty photographing the equipment and conditions at the Quarantine Station of Ellis Island. Many of her photographs from this time were featured in an exhibit at the 1901 Pan-American Exposition in Buffalo, New York, and published in Harper's Weekly Magazine and Medical Record.

Her work was also published in Violet Ward's Bicycling for Ladies in 1896, although she was not credited. The majority of her work was intended for private viewing, as they depicted intimate relationships between Victorian women and scenes from a non-traditional lifestyle, which included smoking, cross-dressing, and biking. Austen's work is today considered significant for providing a rare look into intimate and romantic relationships between Victorian women.

In 1945, when Alice Austen was evicted from her lifelong home, Clear Comfort, she entrusted her archive to her longtime friend Loring McMillen at the Staten Island Historical Society (now known as Historic Richmond Town): a collection of over 7,500 original prints and negatives. In June 2025, Historic Richmond Town repatriated Alice Austen’s photographic archive to the Alice Austen House.

== Later life ==
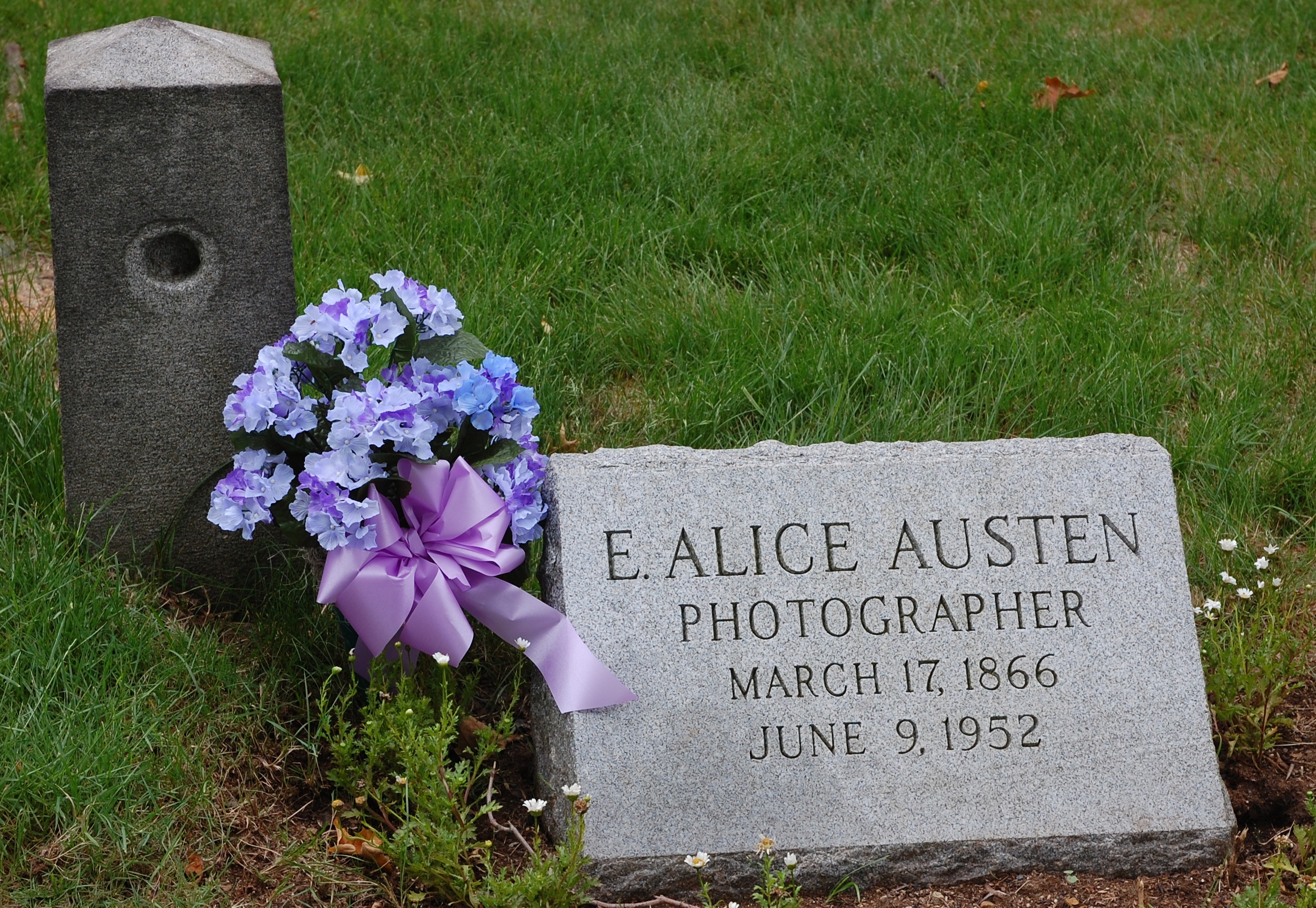
Alice Austen's gravestone in Moravian Cemetery.

Austen continued to take photographs of her home and friends, and of her travels in Europe with Tate, though many of her film negatives from the 1920s and 1930s were never printed. Austen was an active member of Staten Island society, founding the Staten Island Garden Club and participating in the Staten Island Bicycle Club. She is said to have been the first woman in Staten Island to own a car. In 1929, Austen lost her savings in the Wall Street crash, and she and Tate financially struggled throughout the Great Depression. The two women worked to support themselves, with Tate offering dance classes and the brief establishment of a tea room in their home. In 1944, Austen was forced to sell Clear Comfort, and the pair was evicted from the house in 1945. Austen and Tate moved into an apartment in St. George, Staten Island, where they lived until 1949, when it became too difficult to care for Austen's arthritis. She was subsequently declared a pauper by the state and transferred to the New York City Farm Colony in Castleton. Tate moved to Jackson Heights, Queens to live with her family, who disapproved of her relationship with Austen.

In 1951, historian and former LIFE magazine writer Oliver Jensen discovered her photographs, which had been transferred to the Staten Island Historical Society. Jensen helped publish the photos in LIFE and other magazines, helping raise enough money to transfer Austen to a private nursing home. The Staten Island Historical Society also sponsored "Alice Austen Day" featuring the first public exhibit of Austen's work. Austen died on June 9, 1952, following a stroke. She was buried in her family's plot in Moravian Cemetery in Staten Island, and despite their wish to be buried together, Tate was buried in Cypress Hills Cemetery in Brooklyn after her death in 1962.

== Personal life ==
In 1897, Austen met Gertrude Tate, a teacher from Brooklyn, while on vacation in the Catskills. They soon began a romantic relationship, with Tate moving into Clear Comfort in 1917, with the permission of Austen's aunt. There are no records of Austen having identified her sexuality but in 1951 she said that she believed that her being "too good at sports, photography, and mechanics" meant young men had never found her attractive. There is evidence that Austen had relationships with other women before becoming involved with Tate.

== Museum and legacy ==
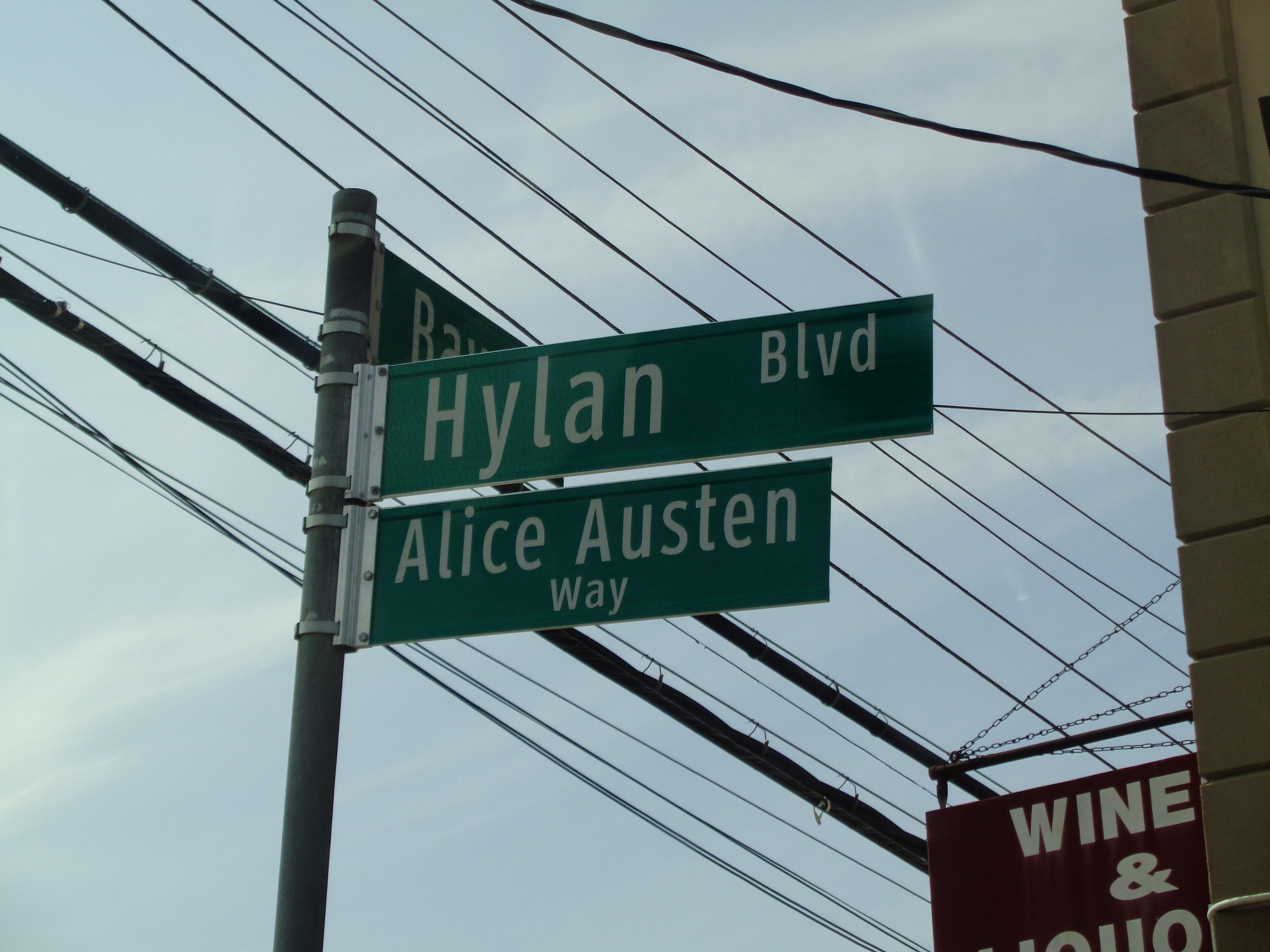
Hylan Boulevard, on which the Alice Austen House is located, has the alternative name, Alice Austen Way.

In the 1960s, when the opening of the Verrazano–Narrows Bridge made waterfront property in Staten Island more valuable, a group of concerned citizens formed The Friends of Alice Austen to save her former home from demolition. Some preservationists involved in this effort included photographer Berenice Abbott, architect Phillip Johnson, and Margot Gayle. The campaign was ultimately successful, with the Landmarks Preservation Commission designating the house as a New York City Landmark, prompting the city to purchase the property in 1975. With over $1 million from the city's capital budget, the Alice Austen House was renovated and opened as a museum in 1985. The house was also designated as a National Historic Landmark in 1993. The Friends of Alice Austen House was formally incorporated as a nonprofit organization in 1979, and continues to operate the house and surrounding garden in coordination with the Department of Parks and Recreation.

In 1994, the Alice Austen House was the site of a demonstration by the activist group the Lesbian Avengers, who advocated for the acknowledgement of Austen and Tate's same-sex relationship.

In 2017, the Alice Austen House was designated as a National LGBT Historic Site, and also received a grant from the National Endowment for the Humanities to incorporate Austen and Tate's relationship into the museum.

In 1976, Austen's story was told in an episode of The 51st State, directed by Stuart Hersh, which inspired PS 60, in the Bulls Head neighborhood of Staten Island, to be named in her honor. A Staten Island Ferry boat is also named after her. Playwright Robin Rice's drama Alice in Black and White traces Austen's life from 1876 to 1951. The play also follows Oliver Jensen's search for and discovery of Austen and her glass plate negatives. The play first premiered at the Kentucky Center in 2013, and then at 59E59 Theaters in New York City in 2016, the 150th anniversary of Austen's birth. The play also received the StageWrite Women's Theatre Initiative Award at the Great Plains Theatre Conference in Omaha, Nebraska.

Her life and work has inspired two young adult fiction books. In 2022, Alex Gino published Alice Austen Lived Here, in which two non-binary middle schoolers do a US History report about Austen, and in 2025, Nora Neus published the graphic novel, Renegade Girls, fictionalizing a romance between Austen and her contemporary stunt girl reporter, Nell Cusack. In 2022, a podcast created by scholar Pamela Bannos in collaboration with the Alice Austen House Museum, titled My Dear Alice, was released, featuring excerpts from Austen's correspondence with various friends and family. There have been two biographies written about Austen: Alice's World: The Life and Photography of an American Original, by Ann Novotny in 1976, and Too Good to Get Married: The Life and Photographs of Miss Alice Austen, published in 2025 by Bonnie Yochelson.

== Gallery ==
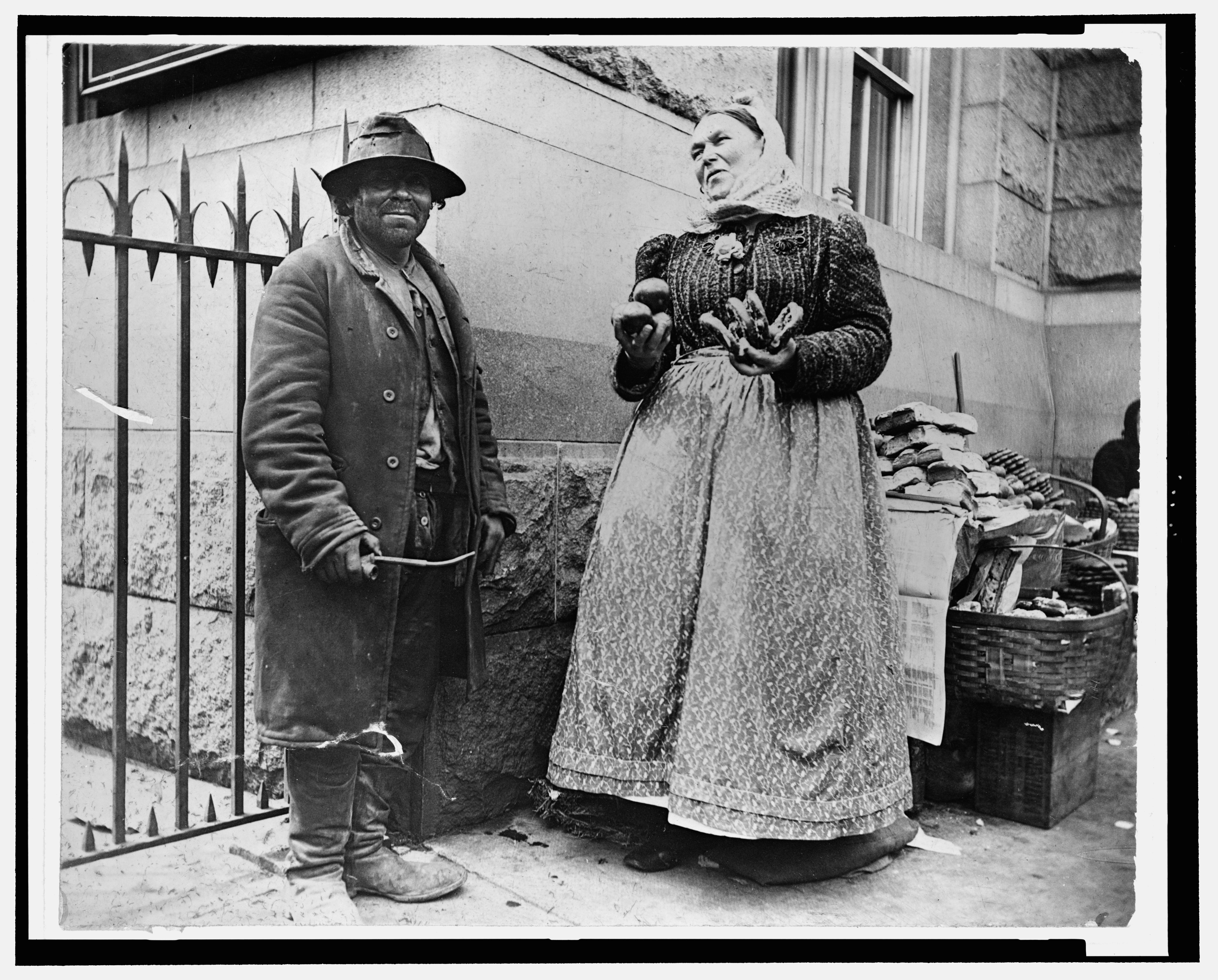
Street types of New York City-Emigrant and pretzel vendor

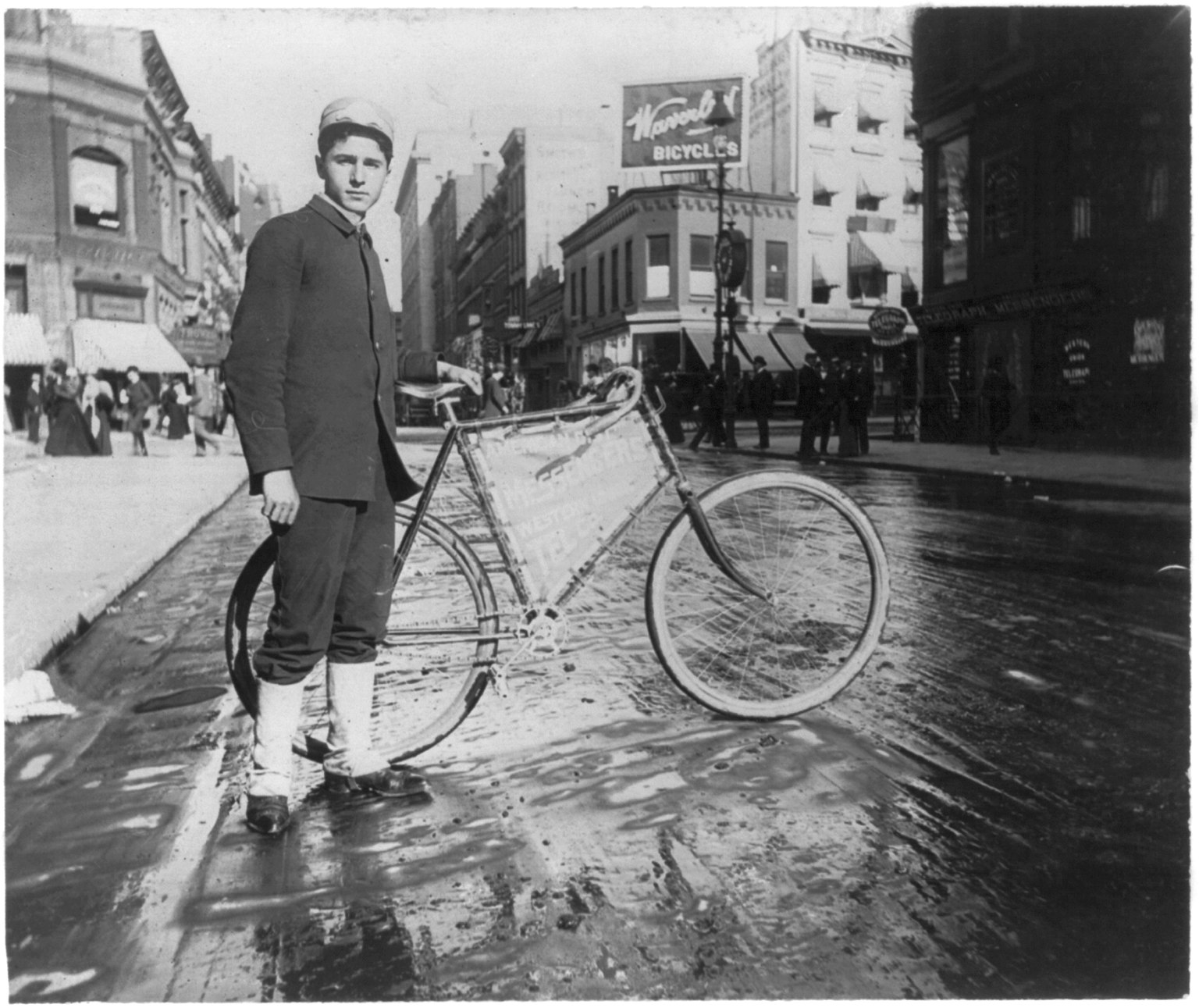
Street Types of New York City-Messenger boy and bike

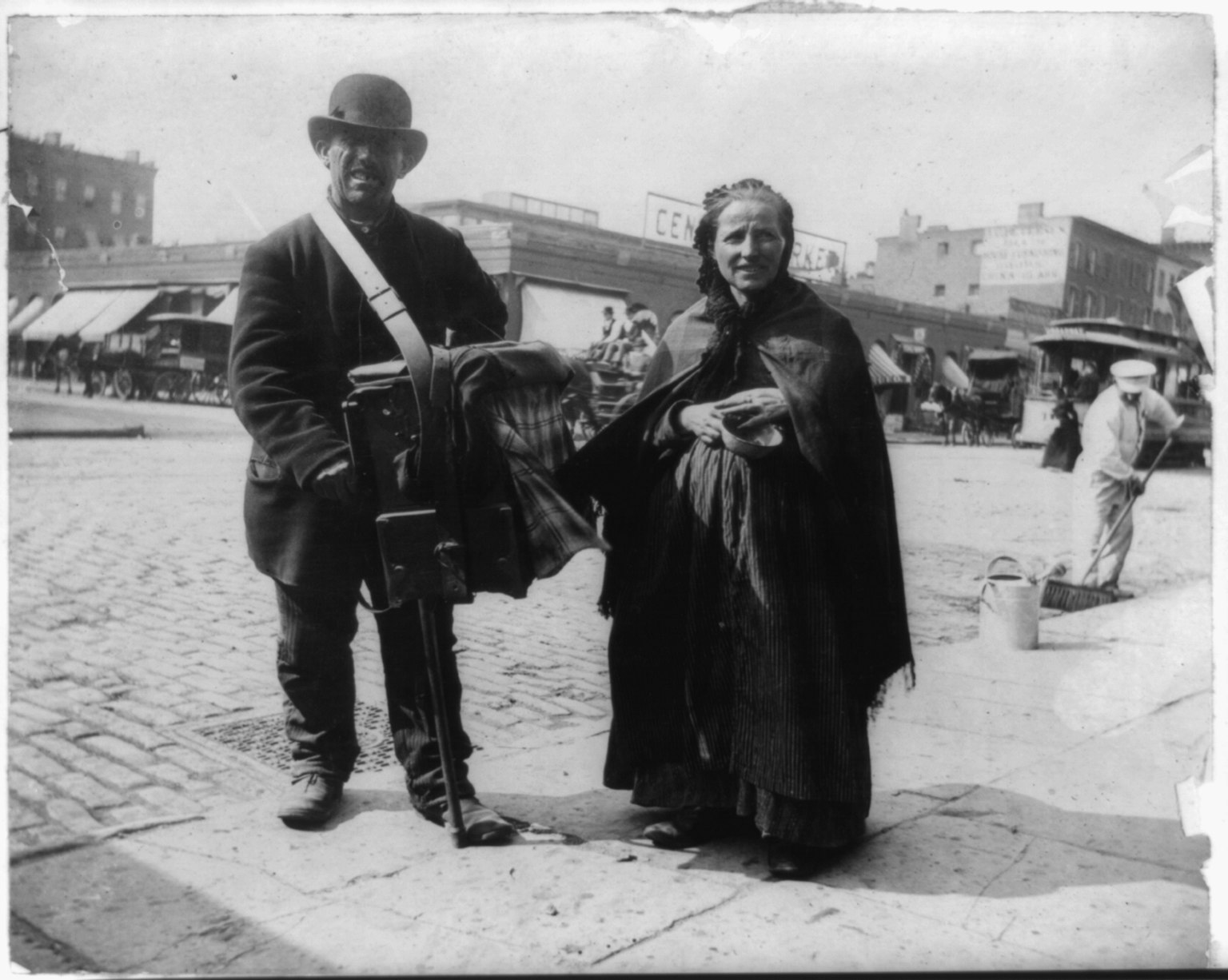
New York City, 1897. The organ grinder and his wife

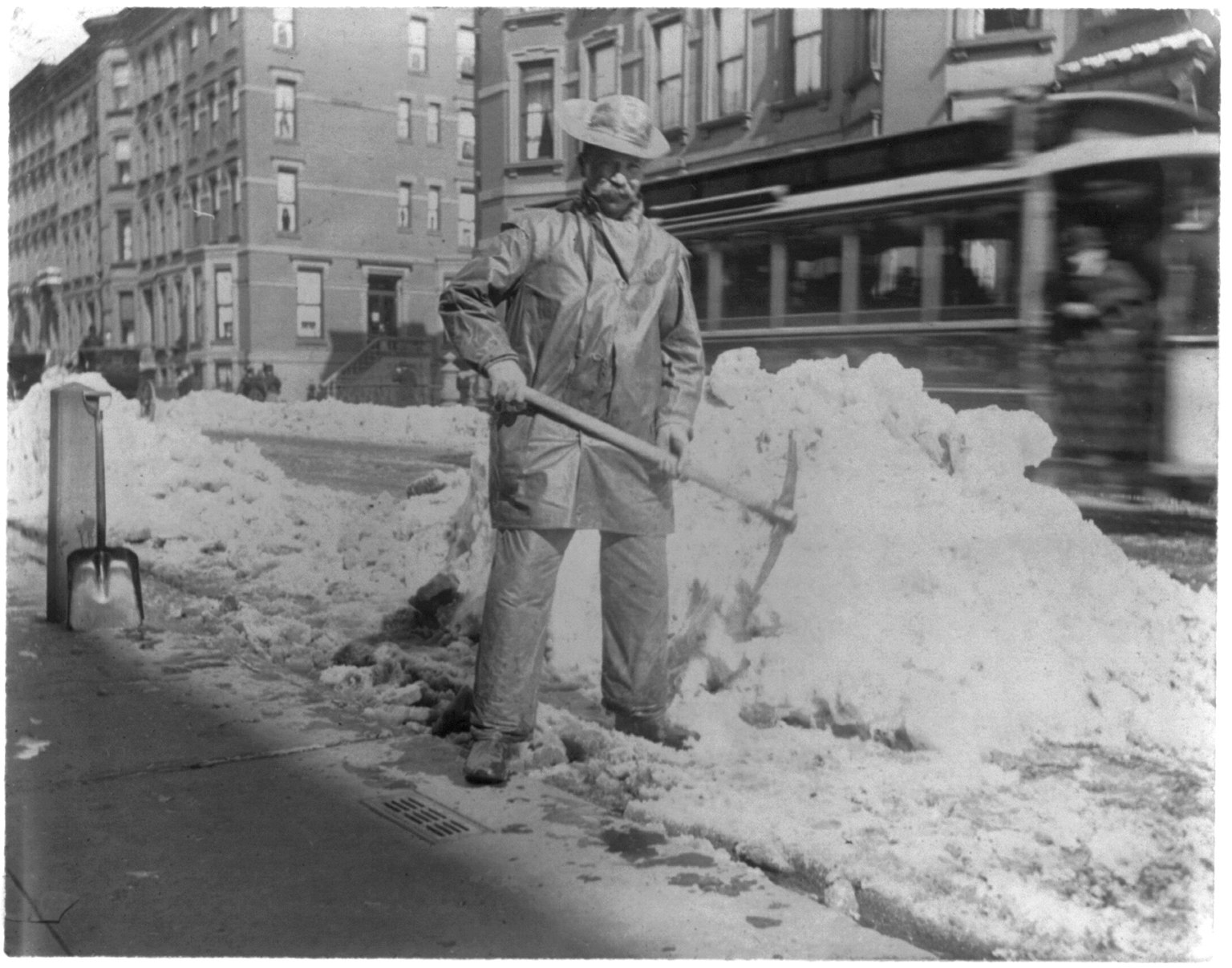
Street types of New York City-Street cleaner with pick ax standing in front of pile of snow

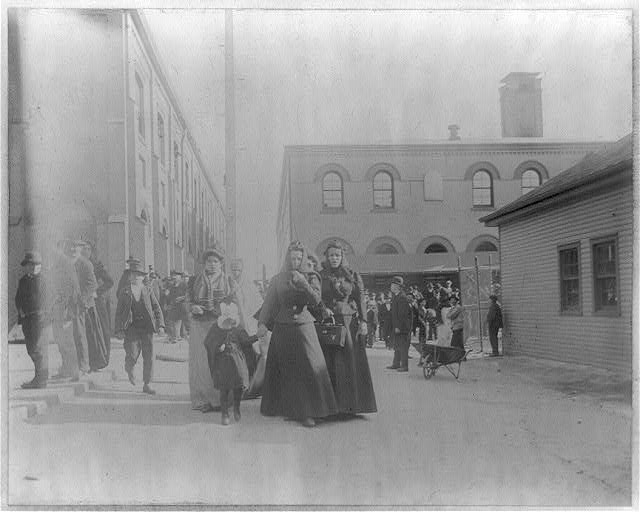
Quarantine station, Hoffman island, NYC-group of immigrants amid buildings

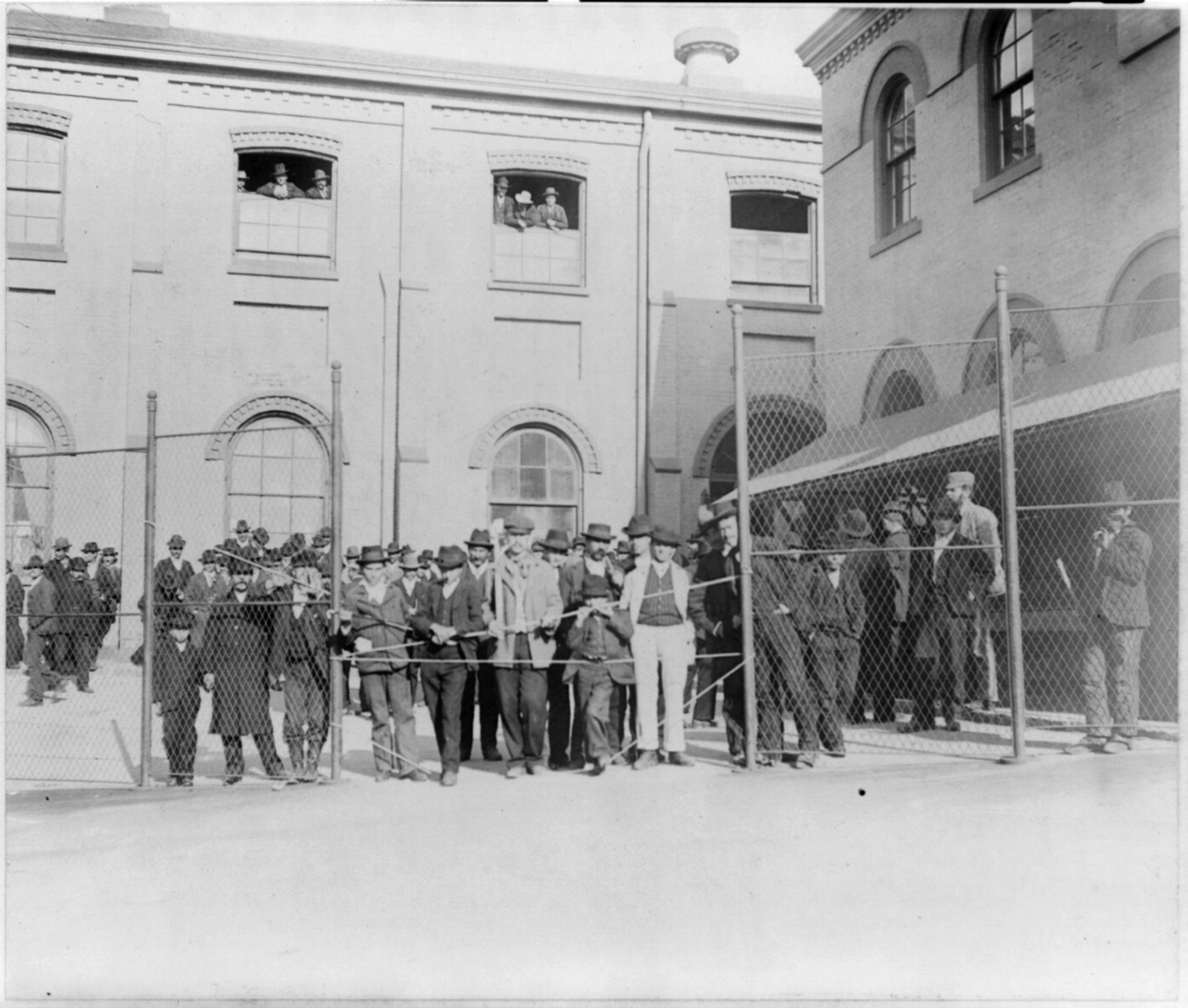
Immigrants from a smallpox ship, held in custody for observation, behind wire fence, Hoffman Island, N.Y.

Ladies' Home Journal Vol. 11 No. 09 (August, 1894)

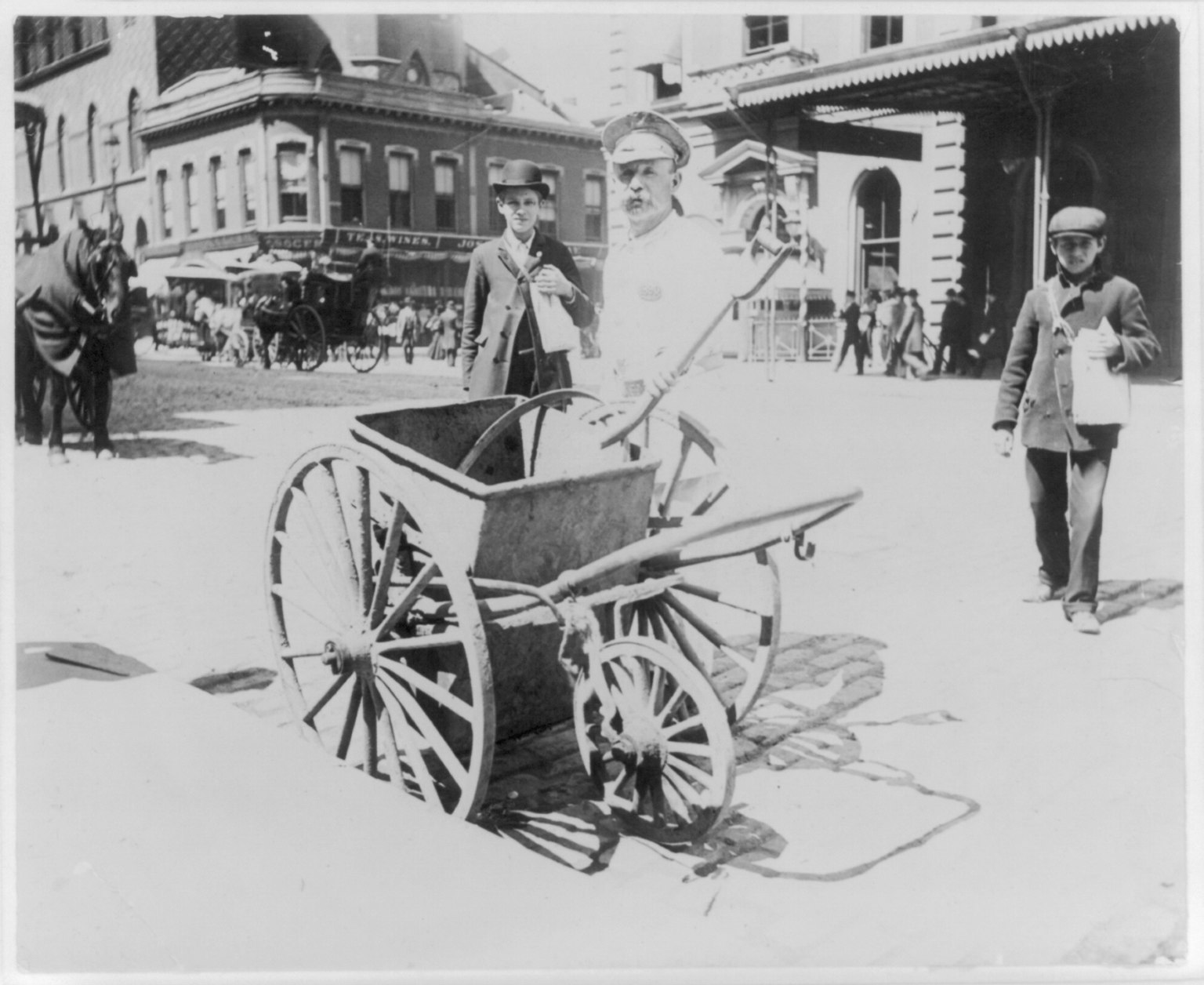
New York City Street sweeper and handcart

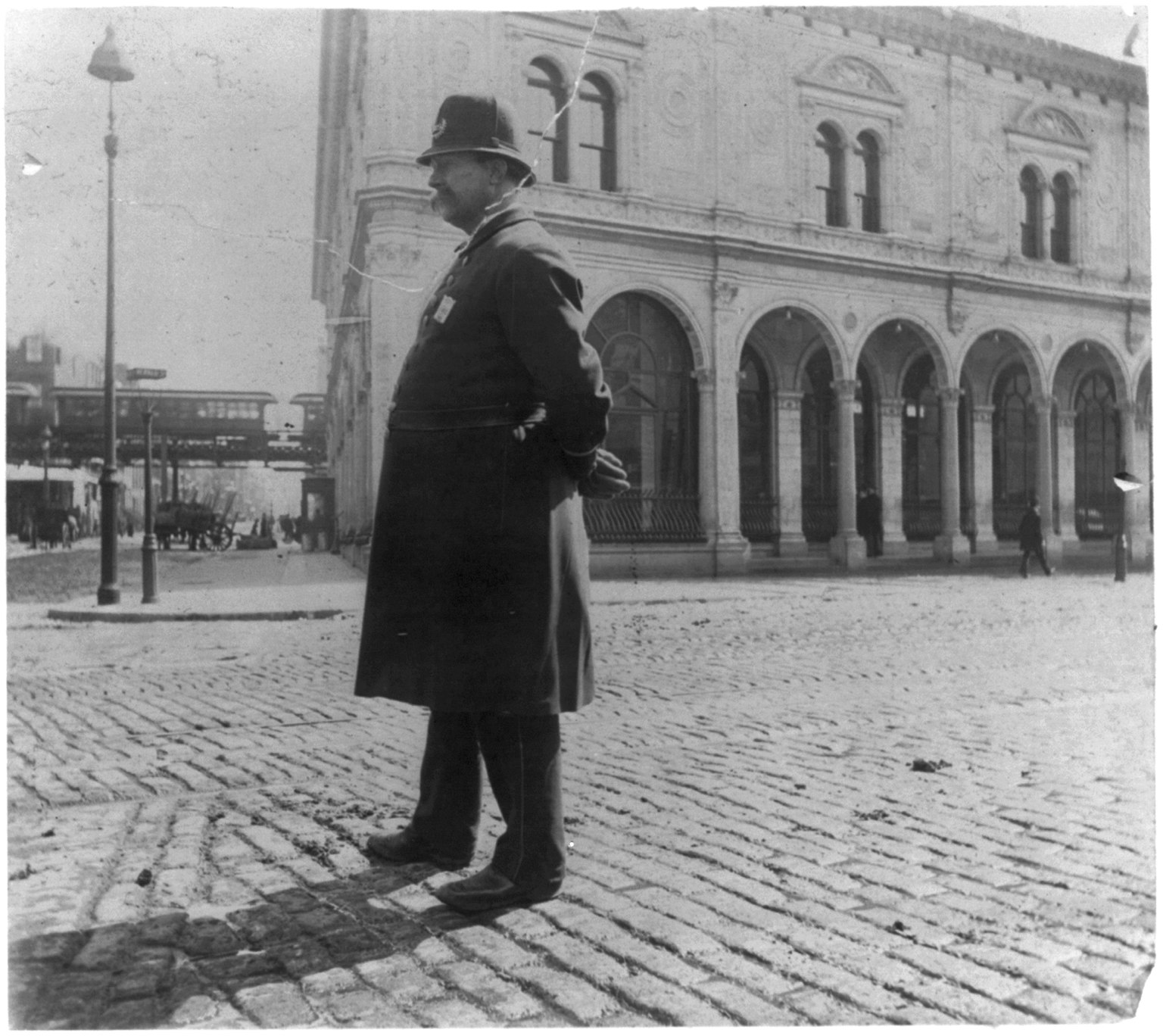
Street types of New York City-Policeman, standing full length facing left

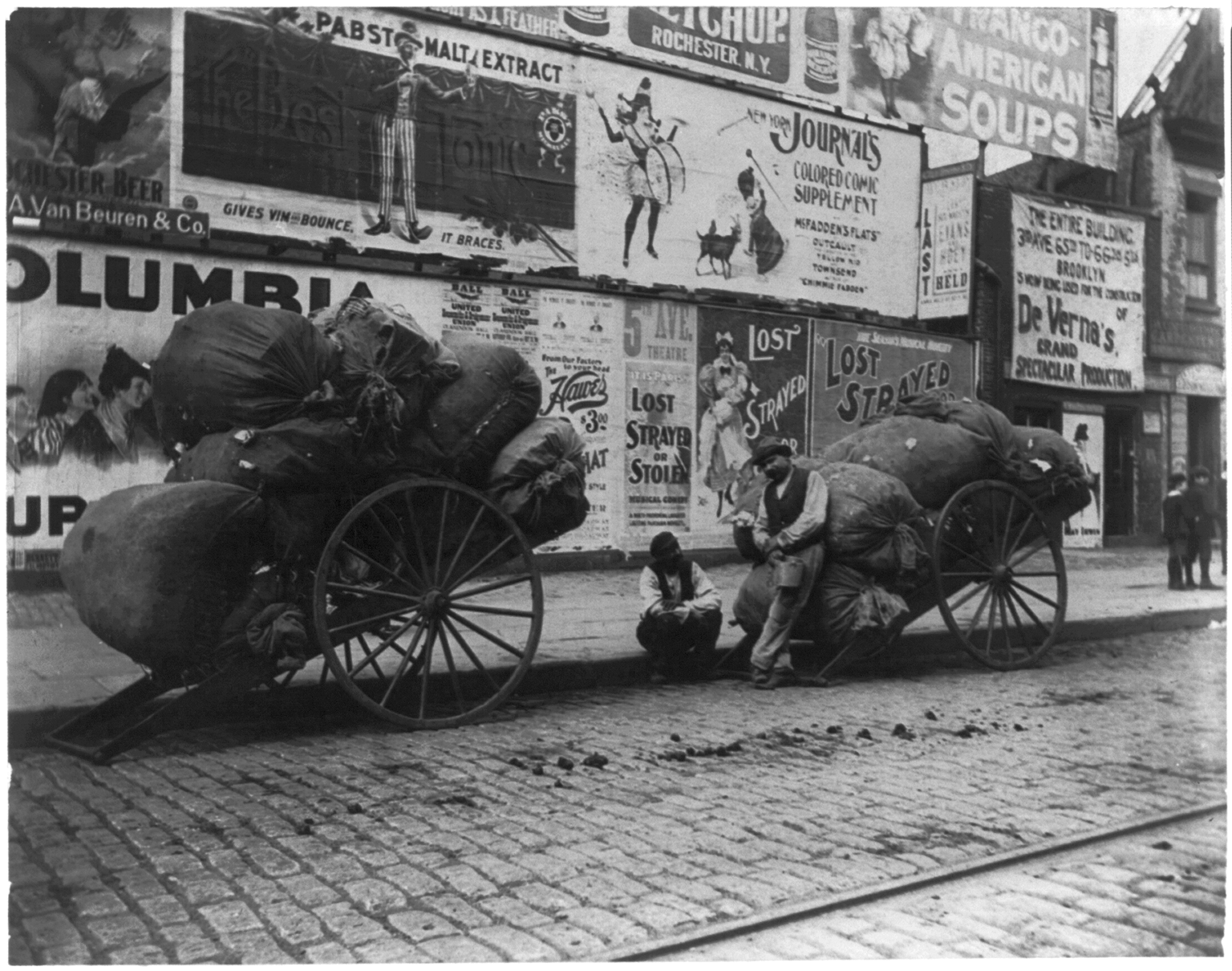
Street types of New York City-2 rag carts

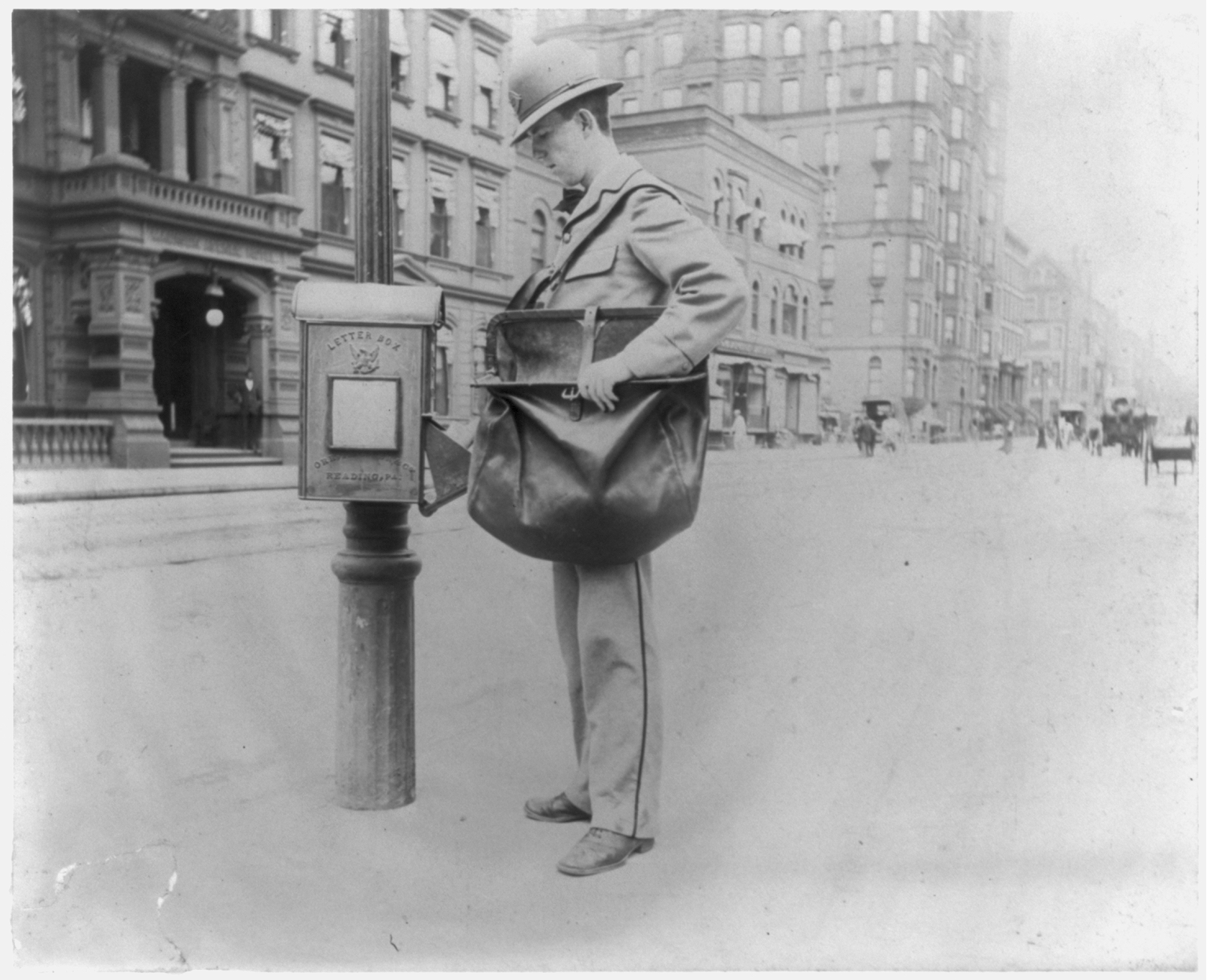
Street types of New York City-Postman at letter box

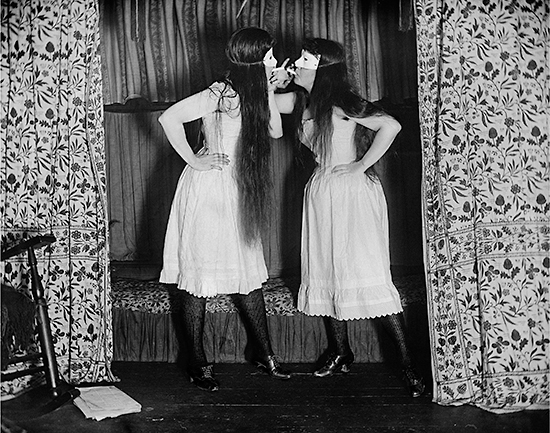
Alice Austen and Trude Eccleston.
