= Rosebank, Staten Island =

Neighborhood in New York City

Coordinates: 40°36′51″N 74°03′58″W

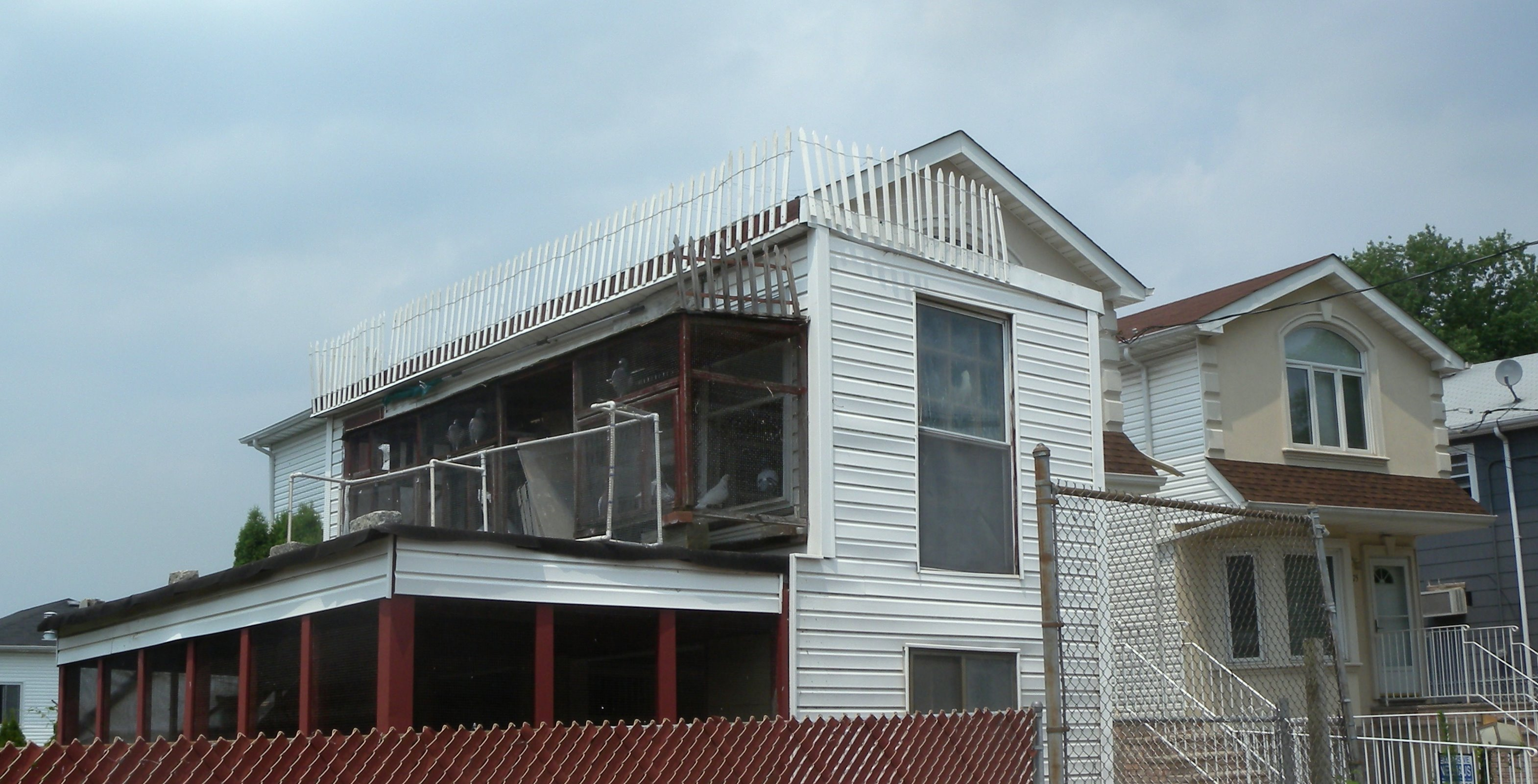
Coop for racing pigeons in Rosebank

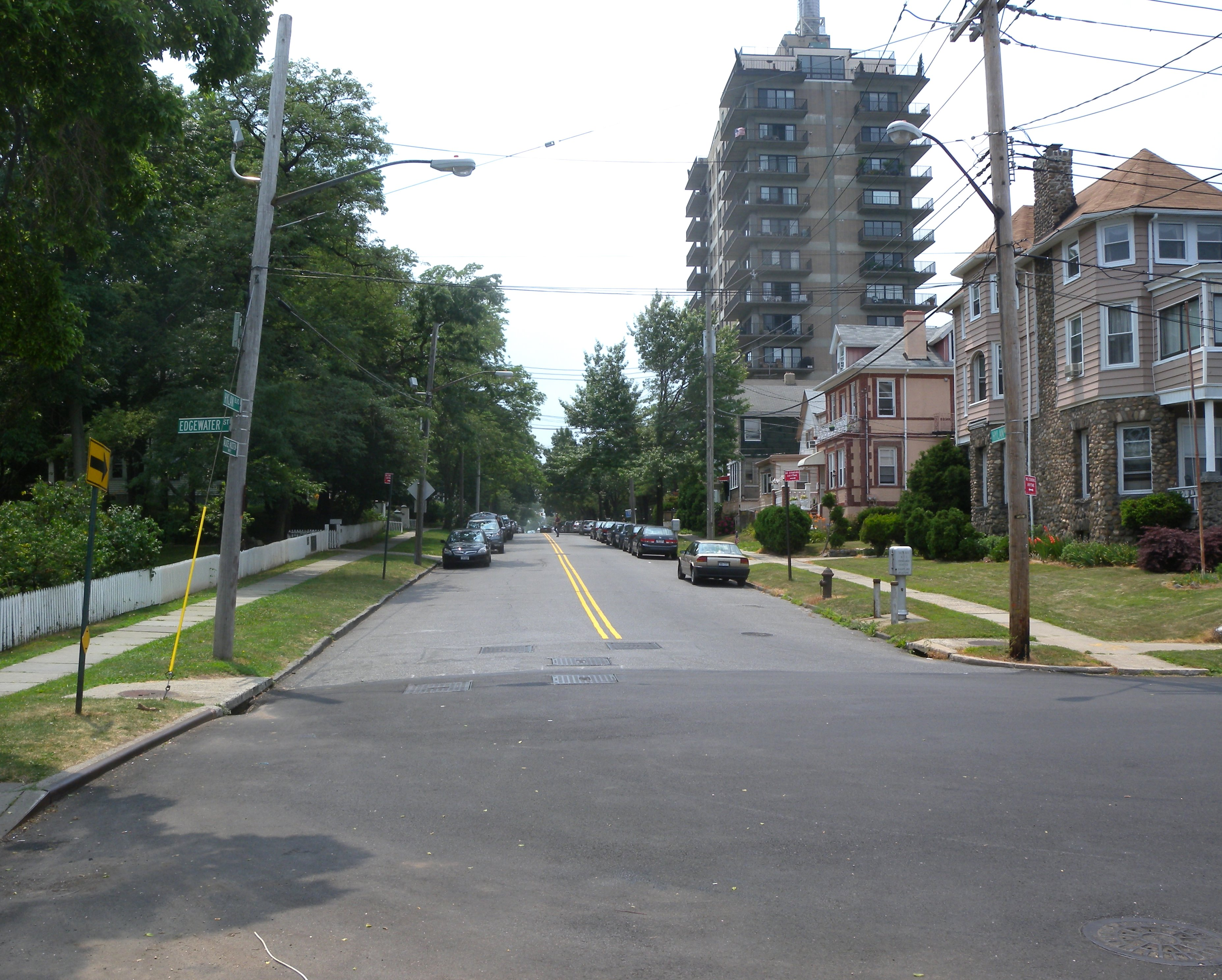
Homes and apartment buildings on Hylan Boulevard in Rosebank

Rosebank is a neighborhood in northeastern Staten Island, one of New York City's five boroughs. It borders Clifton to the north, Arrochar to the south, and the Upper New York Bay to the east.

== History ==
Originally called Peterstown, then Clifton and the Village of Edgewater, the neighborhood appears to have first acquired the name "Rosebank" around 1880.

Before 1880, the area was the "Newport, Rhode Island" of New York, home to great estates. Some of the richest families in the country had mansions along the shore and inland. The New York Yacht Club summer house was built there and still stands beside the Alice Austen House. The Vanderbilts, Aspinwalls, and Townsends built and attended St. John's Episcopal Church. The first baptism there was for Cornelius Vanderbilt II.

Later, the big farms and estates were divided into small parcels, and, soon after 1880, Italian immigrants began settling in the area. Their descendants have continued as its predominant ethnic group, exemplified by the prominence of the Garibaldi Memorial in the community.

The neighborhood once had a federal quarantine station for incoming immigrants (closed in 1971) and was the home of noted photographer Alice Austen, one of Staten Island's best-known historic figures. The Garibaldi-Meucci Museum is co-named for longtime resident Antonio Meucci, who had some claim to the invention of a working telephone. But he was too impoverished to obtain a patent or market his discovery. When Giuseppe Garibaldi, in exile from Italy, visited the United States, he stayed for a time at Meucci's home. That later inspired the museum's name, honoring both men.

Eventually, Rosebank's Eibs Pond Park would serve as a filming location for Womanhood, the Glory of the Nation (1917), as well as an Italian Prisoner-of-war camp during World War II.

Along with the Garibaldi-Meucci Museum, the Elizabeth Alice Austen House, McFarlane-Bredt House, and Our Lady of Mount Carmel Grotto are listed on the National Register of Historic Places.

== Community ==
In recent years, the neighborhood has experienced an influx of other ethnic groups, including Eastern Europeans, various Hispanic nationalities, as well as Asians, particularly from the Philippines.

The age, density, and architectural style of Rosebank's housing stock resembles most of the island's North Shore neighborhoods, but demographically, Rosebank has more in common with East Shore communities such as New Dorp. As a result, there is considerable disagreement regarding Rosebank's classification within the island's various regions.

== Notable people ==
Notable current and former residents of Rosebank include:

- Antonio Meucci (1808–1889), inventor, is credited by many to have invented the first telephone. The U.S. House of Representatives honored Meucci in a resolution in 2002 for having had important role in the development of the telephone communications.
- Alice Austen (1866–1952), photographer, lifelong resident of Staten Island
- Sir Roderick W. Cameron (1825–1900), shipping company owner
- Nicole Malliotakis (born 1980), Republican member of the New York Assembly, U.S. House of Representatives and first Hispanic-American elected to a Staten Island district
- Gianni Russo (born 1943), actor and singer

== Education ==
The Roman Catholic Archdiocese of New York operates Staten Island's Catholic schools, which included St. Mary School in Rosebank. In 2011, its final year, St. Mary's had 224 students, 90 percent of capacity. The archdiocese's decision to close it, despite its relatively high enrollment, had to do with the fact, according to Amy Padnani of Silive.com, that it was one of Staten Island's oldest Catholic educational facilities and therefore, "some speculate, the school was chosen [for closure] because of infrastructure problems". St. Joseph's School in Rosebank, with an enrollment of 167 students, closed in 2013.

In January 2023, the New York City School Construction Authority (CSA) announced the property of the former St. Mary School would become an annex for a public school, expecting to serve pre-K through second grade. The City Council approved the 252-seat “early childhood center” at 1 Virginia Avenue. By July 2025, the previous building had been demolished to make way for the new annex to PS 13. The new building estimates 283 seats for early childhood education, and is expected to open in September 2027.

== Transportation ==
After elimination of the Bachmann station, the Rosebank station near Clifton Avenue and Tilson Place was the first stop on Staten Island Railway's now-defunct South Beach Branch, following its divergence from the main line at the Clifton station, immediately to the north. Service on this entire branch was halted in 1953. Hylan Boulevard, New York City's longest commercial roadway, begins in Rosebank, en route to Tottenville, about 14 miles (22.5 km) away.

Local buses S52 and S78 travel on Tompkins Avenue, S51 and S81 buses serve Bay Street, and SIM1, SIM7 and SIM10 express buses take Narrows Road North to and from Manhattan. SIM30 also provides express bus service to and from Manhattan.
