= Staten Island Ferry Disaster Memorial Museum =

2016 art installation commemorating a fake event

The Staten Island Ferry Disaster Memorial Museum was a 2016 art installation hoax created by artist Joe Reginella. The memorial purported to commemorate an attack by a gigantic octopus on the Staten Island Ferry at 4 a.m. on November 22, 1963.

== See also ==
- The Battery
