= Ollis-class ferry =

Staten Island Ferry vessels

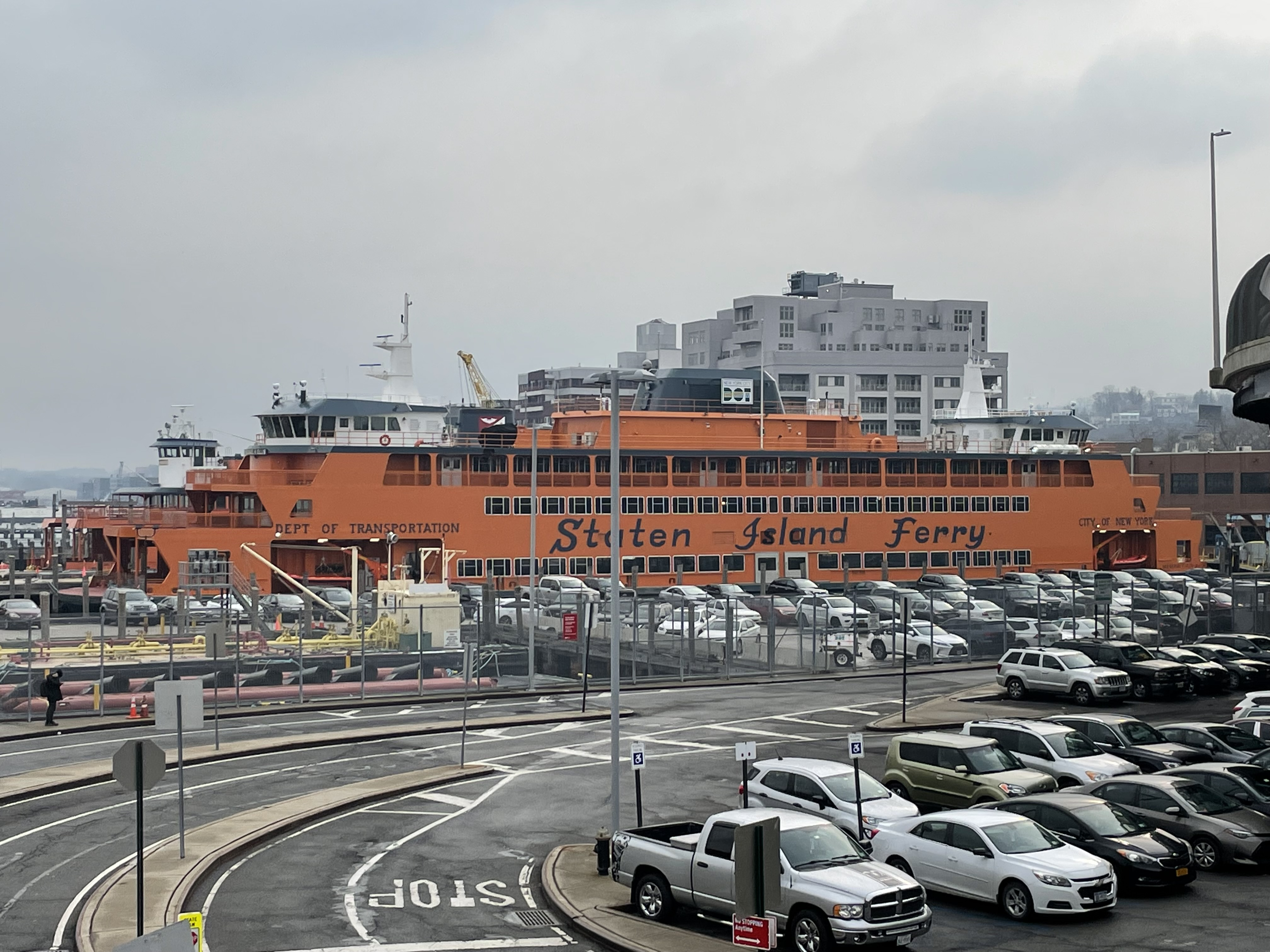
- MV SSG Michael H. Ollis docked in St. George in January 2022

Class overview
- Builders: Eastern Shipbuilding
- Operators: Staten Island Ferry
- Preceded by: Molinari-class
- In service: 2022–present
- Planned: 3
- Completed: 3
- Active: 3

General characteristics
- Type: Ollis-class passenger ferry
- Length: 320 ft (98 m)
- Beam: 70 ft (21 m)
- Draft: 13 ft (4.0 m)
- Propulsion: EMD 710 diesel engines
- Capacity: 4,500 passengers
- Crew: 16

The Ollis-class ferries are a trio of passenger ferries on the Staten Island Ferry, the first of which entered service in 2022. The class is named after US Army Staff Sergeant Michael Ollis, a Staten Islander who was killed in action during the War in Afghanistan in 2013 and was awarded the Medal of Honor by President Donald Trump in February 2026.

== History ==
Early work on the class began in August 2014, after a study into the future of Staten Island Ferry's fleet showed that the most economical course would be new-build ships instead of rebuilding existing vessels. The Elliott Bay Design Group was awarded a contract to design the new ships, intended to replace MV John F. Kennedy and MV Andrew J. Barberi, resulting in one additional ship in the Staten Island Ferry fleet. The following month, substantial funding for the project, covering the construction of two ships, was secured with a $191.6 million federal grant from the Hurricane Sandy relief bill. As part of the new order, city officials allowed passengers to vote on the types of seats that would be installed in the new fleet.

In November 2016, Eastern Shipbuilding was confirmed as the low bidder for constructing the ships, and the shipyard was awarded the contract with a notice to proceed on March 1, 2017. The final price for construction of the three vessels was $314 million; in addition to the federal grant, state and city funding was also used. The first vessel, MV SSG Michael H. Ollis, named after decorated U.S. Army soldier Michael Ollis, was expected to be delivered in mid-2019, followed later that year by MV Sandy Ground, named after an early African American settlement on Staten Island.

A petition to name the third Ollis-class ship after Staten Island firefighter John G. Chipura, who died in the September 11 attacks, reached 11,000 signatures by September 2017. Other proposed namesakes included Russel Timoshenko, an NYPD officer killed in the line of duty in 2007. In March 2020, the Mayor's office announced it would be named for Catholic social activist Dorothy Day.

In October 2018, the timeline for the ferries' delivery was pushed back. Some of the parts for the first two Ollis-class ferries were being manufactured at Eastern Shipbuilding's shipyard in Panama City, Florida, which had been severely damaged after Hurricane Michael that month. MV SSG Michael H. Ollis was launched in November 2019, with an expected delivery date of August 2020. MV Sandy Ground was launched in June 2020. Due to the COVID-19 pandemic in the United States, the arrival of the new fleet was delayed again in July 2020. MV SSG Michael H. Ollis was towed from Florida to New York in August 2021, and she entered service on February 14, 2022.

MV Sandy Ground was delivered at the end of December 2021 and entered service on June 17, 2022. On December 22, 2022, a fire broke out in the engine room of the Sandy Ground. The ferry remained out of service for repairs until late April 2025.

The third ferry, MV Dorothy Day was launched at 26 March 2021, delivered in September 2022, and entered service on April 28, 2023.

== Design ==
Each ship of the class is 320 feet (98 m) long, with a beam of 70 feet (21 m), and a loaded draft of 13 feet (4.0 m). Each ship can carry up to 4,500 passengers, with a crew complement of 16. The four EMD 12-710 diesel engines in each ship are arranged in two married pairs, each of which drive a cycloidal propeller at each end of the ship for double-ended operation.
