= MV Andrew J. Barberi =

Retired Staten Island Ferry vessel

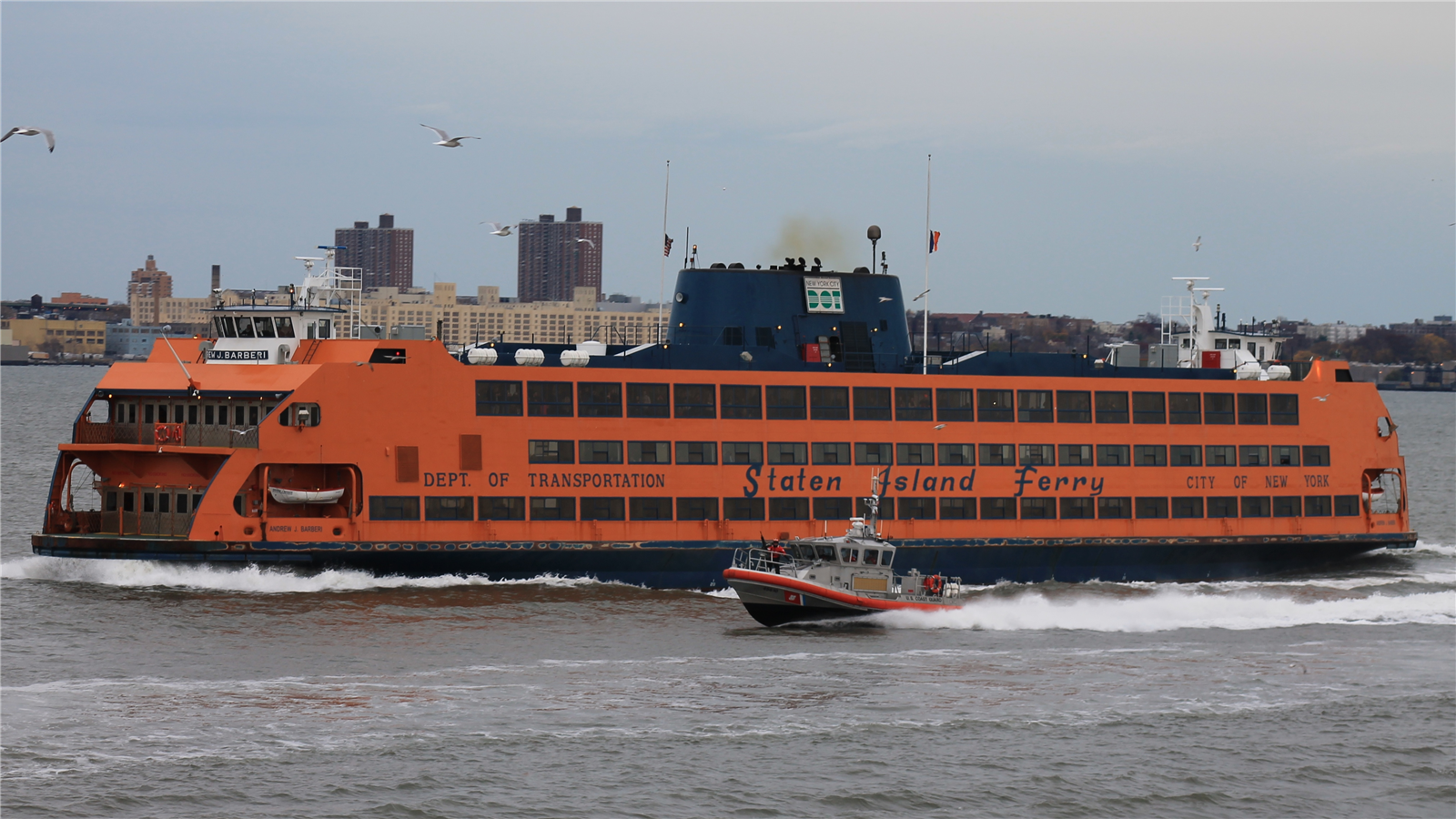
- Andrew J. Barberi underway in Lower New York Bay, in November 2015.

History
- Name: MV Andrew J. Barberi
- Owner: City of New York
- Operator: Staten Island Ferry/City of New York
- Port of registry: New York
- Builder: Equitable Equipment Company, Madisonville. LA and New Orleans. LA
- Yard number: 1713
- Completed: 1981
- Acquired: May 1981
- Maiden voyage: August 1981
- In service: 1981
- Out of service: October 2023
- Identification: IMO number: 7702762; MMSI number: 367000150; Callsign: WYR3370
- Fate: Scrapped in 2025

General characteristics
- Class & type: Barberi Class passenger ferry
- Tonnage: 3335
- Length: 310 ft 2 in (94.54 m)
- Beam: 69 feet 10 inches (21.29 m)
- Draft: 13 feet 6 inches (4.11 m)
- Decks: 3
- Ramps: 2
- Installed power: Four GM-EMD Roots-blown V16 645E, 8,000 horsepower (6.0 MW) total
- Propulsion: Two Voith Schneider Propeller
- Speed: 16 knots (30 km/h)
- Capacity: 6,000

The MV Andrew J. Barberi was a Barberi-class ferry boat that was operated as part of the Staten Island Ferry between Manhattan and Staten Island in New York City. With a capacity of 6,000, she was among the highest-capacity boats in the ferry's fleet. Andrew J. Barberi was named after the longtime coach of Curtis High School's football team. Since her introduction in 1981, she has had a history of incidents, including a 2003 crash that killed 11 people and a 2010 crash that injured 37. The boat was retired in 2023, and the city placed her for sale in 2024. In March 2025, the vessel was scrapped.

== Description ==
The Andrew J. Barberi was the first of two Staten Island Ferry boats in the Barberi class, which also includes MV Samuel I. Newhouse (built 1982). Each boat has a crew of 15, can carry 6,000 passengers but no cars, is 310 feet (94 m) long and 69 feet 10 inches (21.29 m) wide, with a draft of 13 feet 6 inches (4.11 m), a gross tonnage of 3,335 short tons (2,978 long tons; 3,025 t), a service speed of 16 knots (30 km/h), and four engines capable of 8,000 horsepower (6.0 MW). The Andrew J. Barberi has two propellers each capable of 3,500 horsepower (2,600 kW). Both ships in the Barberi class were built at the Equitable Shipyard in New Orleans, at a cost of $16.5 million each. At the time of construction, the ships' capacity was the largest of any licensed ferry in the world.

The Andrew J. Barberi made her maiden voyage in August 1981 and, along with the Samuel I. Newhouse, was built to replace three steam-powered vessels. Andrew J. Barberi was named after the longtime coach of Curtis High School's football team, who had died shortly before the ship was commissioned. Barberi coached throughout the 1950s, '60s and '70s and was instrumental in the development of scholastic football on Staten Island.

== 2003 crash ==
On October 15, 2003, Andrew J. Barberi collided with a pier on Staten Island. Eleven people were killed, including one decapitation, and 70 more injured as a result. On March 8, 2005, the National Transportation Safety Board (NTSB) published a report on its investigation into the incident. The NTSB determined the probable cause of the collision was the assistant pilot's sudden incapacitation due to unreported and illegal use of prescription medications for chronic pain, high blood pressure and insomnia (none of these conditions had been reported to the Coast Guard as required by law), with a contributory cause of the master's failure to maintain command and control of his vessel.

The assistant pilot pleaded guilty to 11 counts of seaman's manslaughter and falsifying his medical forms. The ferry director also pleaded guilty after failing to enforce a rule requiring that ferries be operated by two pilots, and the doctor who had certified the assistant pilot pleaded guilty to making a false statement about the assistant pilot's health. Andrew J. Barberi was rebuilt in West Brighton, Staten Island by Caddell Dry Dock & Repair Co. and, on July 1, 2004, returned to regular service. A plaque was installed inside the ferryboat, commemorating the victims of the crash.

== 2010 crash ==
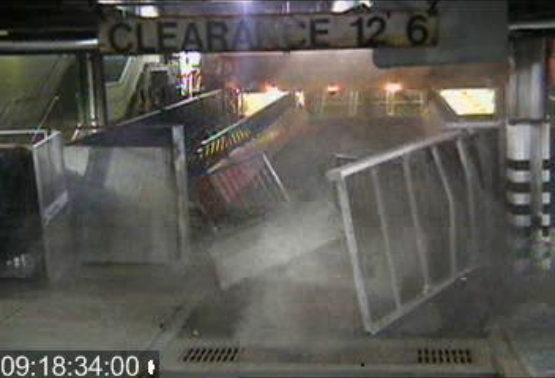
The moment of the collision between Andrew J. Barberi and the St. George Terminal in 2010

At 9:18 a.m. on May 8, 2010, the Andrew J. Barberi forcefully collided with the St. George Terminal on Staten Island, hitting a passenger bridge at the terminal. She had been traveling at about 5 knots (9.3 km/h; 5.8 mph) at the time of the collision. Around 40 passengers were taken to the hospital for a variety of injuries. The only damage was found above the waterline of the Staten Island end of the vessel.

An NTSB investigation found that there was a problem with the vessel's propulsion system. At one end of the vessel was a propulsion control panel, where electric solenoids were used to shift hydraulic valves. These valves sent hydraulic oil to the control cylinders on the propulsion units, shifting the pitch setting of the units. Investigators found that bronze ring fragments had lodged themselves in the solenoids, preventing their correct operation. The NTSB announced their findings in April 2012.

== Retirement and fate ==
The New York City government was looking to retire the aging Andrew J. Barberi by 2012, and her replacements, the Ollis-class ferries, were announced in 2014. The Andrew J. Barberi was retired from service in October 2023. The New York City Department of Citywide Administrative Services placed the boat for sale at an auction in May 2024; the starting price for the auction was set at $155,000. That June, the boat was sold for $101,000. It was scrapped the next year. Her sister ship: Samuel I. Newhouse, remains in service as of 2026.
