= MV John F. Kennedy =

Staten Island Ferry vessel

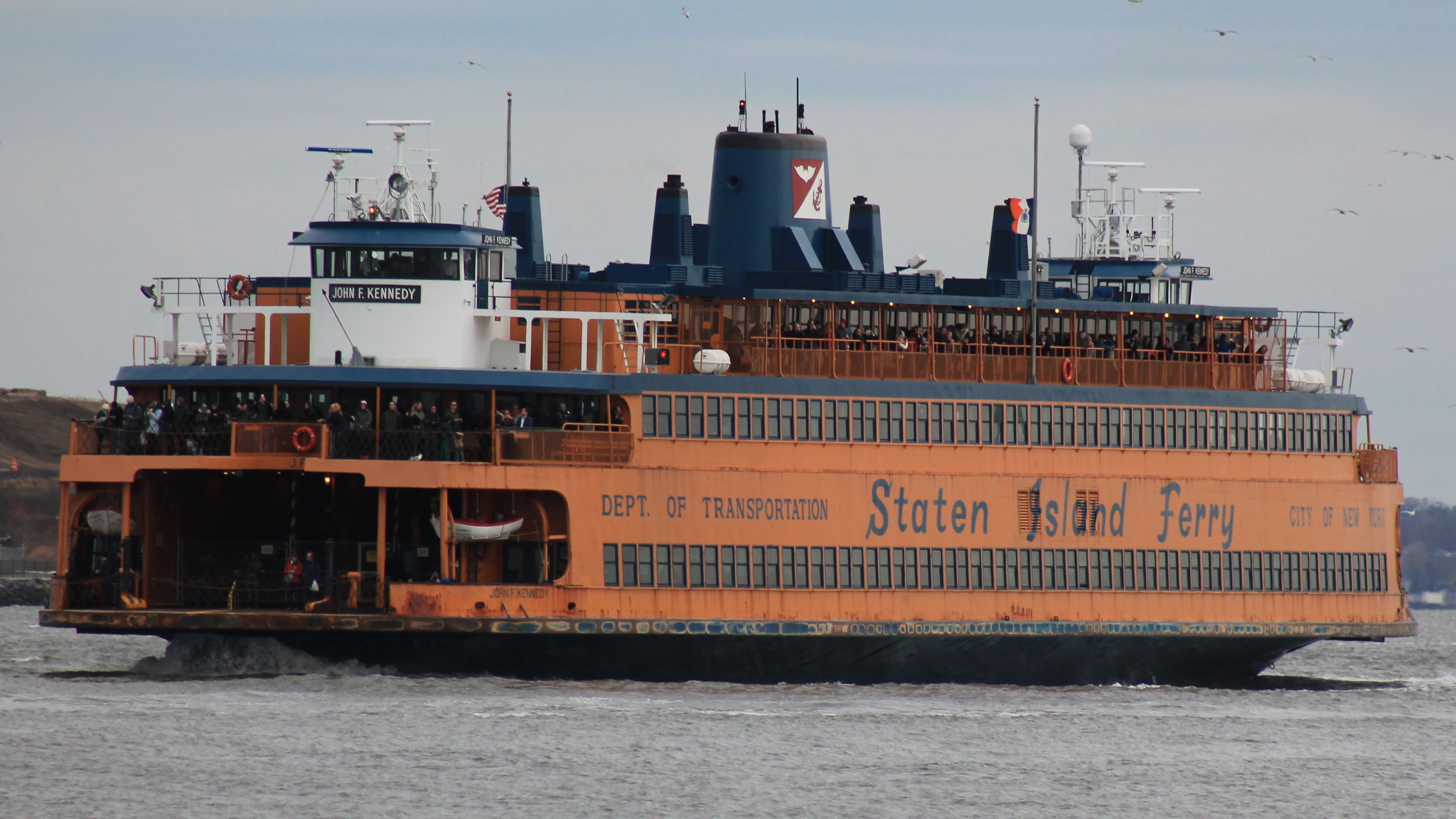
- John F. Kennedy approaching Manhattan in November 2015.

History
- Name: John F. Kennedy
- Namesake: John F. Kennedy
- Owner: Pete Davidson, Colin Jost, Paul Italia, Ron Castellano
- Operator: Staten Island Ferry/City of New York
- Port of registry: New York
- Ordered: 1963
- Builder: Levingston Shipbuilding Company
- Yard number: 647
- Launched: 1965
- Completed: May 14, 1965
- Out of service: January 2022
- Identification: IMO number: 8643195; MMSI number: 367000190; Callsign: WV8121
- Status: Retired from commercial service; to be converted into entertainment venue

General characteristics
- Class & type: Kennedy-class passenger ferry
- Tonnage: 2109
- Length: 277 ft (84 m)
- Beam: 69 ft (21 m)
- Draft: 19 ft 1 in (5.82 m)
- Decks: 3
- Installed power: 6,500 horsepower
- Propulsion: 4 GM-EMD 567C16 diesel engines
- Speed: 11.4 knots (21.1 km/h) (average)
- Capacity: 3,500 passengers, 40 cars

MV John F. Kennedy is the last remaining Kennedy-class ferry, formerly operated for the Staten Island Ferry in New York City, New York, United States. It was built by the Levingston Shipbuilding Company between 1963 and 1965 for the Department of Marine and Aviation. The John F. Kennedy operated until 2021, and she was subsequently sold to Paul Italia, Ron Castellano, Colin Jost, and Pete Davidson. As of 2025, restoration of the John F. Kennedy had not yet started.

== History ==
Built by the Levingston Shipbuilding Company between 1963 and 1965 for the Department of Marine and Aviation, the John F. Kennedy was delivered May 14, 1965.

John F. Kennedy was named for the 35th President of the United States. She entered service in 1965 alongside her two sister ships, the MV American Legion and the MV The Gov. Herbert H. Lehman. While American Legion was retired in 2006 as the newer Molinari-class ferries entered service, and The Gov. Herbert H. Lehman was decommissioned the following year, John F. Kennedy remained in service as a favorite of both passengers and ferry operators, mainly running "as needed" on weekday schedules (when four of the six boats are needed for service). Captains considered her to be the most reliable vessel in the fleet, and riders preferred her abundant open-air deck space.

=== Retirement ===
John F. Kennedy was retired from service in August 2021, to be replaced by the recently completed MV Michael H. Ollis, the lead ship of a new trio of ferries, collectively known as the Ollis-class. The design of this new class is heavily influenced by John F. Kennedy, featuring her distinctive outdoor promenades and extended foredecks.

Following her retirement, Kennedy was moored at St. George Terminal to await her fate. By January 16, 2022, New York City was attempting to sell the vessel at auction for $125,000, after an earlier attempt to sell the vessel at $250,000 garnered no bids. The auction concluded on January 19, 2022, with the ferry sold "as is" and "where is" to Paul Italia, Ron Castellano, and Saturday Night Live comedians Colin Jost and Pete Davidson for a final selling price of $280,100. The new owners planned on converting the ferry into an entertainment venue at the cost of $34 million as of 2024. In April 2022, Kennedy was towed to a shipyard in New Brighton, Staten Island, since her final location remained undecided. Castellano said in early 2024 that he was continuing to revise the plans for Kennedy's renovation.

The first event held on the vessel, in September 2024, was a fashion show for Tommy Hilfiger's spring 2025 collection; this was the first time she had been towed away from the shipyard since 2022. Two years after Jost and Davidson's acquisition, the renovation of John F. Kennedy had still not started, and both men had expressed regret over acquiring the vessel; Jost's wife Scarlett Johansson, who had expressed shock and later skepticism when Jost told her about the purchase, had tried to get her husband to sell Kennedy. The company that had towed Kennedy to the shipyard had sued Jost and Davidson for non-payment of towing fees. The New York Times wrote that the vessel would require extensive modifications before being used as an entertainment venue, and that even scrapping her would likely not be cost-effective. Jost and Davidson tried to sell Kennedy (a move parodied in a May 2025 episode of Saturday Night Live) but later withdrew their offer. By 2026, marine experts suggested that the vessel could be sunk if no other options were viable, but Jost denied that Kennedy had been a waste of his and Davidson's money.

== See also ==
- List of memorials to John F. Kennedy
