= Joseph Reginella =

Joseph Reginella (born 1971) is a sculptor from Silver Lake, Staten Island. Described by The New York Times as the "Banksy of monuments", he has created a number of sculptures memorializing fictional events, including when a giant octopus pulled the Staten Island Ferry into the Hudson River in 1963 and when a stampede of elephants crossed the Brooklyn Bridge in 1929.

== Career ==
Reginella began sculpting at the age of 14 in 1985; he is self-taught. He moved from Staten Island to New Jersey in the mid-1980s, but returned to Staten Island in 1993. He has worked as a commercial artist since 1994. He designed the memorial to the September 11 attacks at the Snug Harbor Cultural Center.

Since 2015, he has installed 6 sculptures in Battery Park that commemorate made-up historical incidents. The sculptures are made of Styrofoam and plywood but painted and finished to look like granite. The dates that the fictional events occurred at times to overlap with well known, real historical events; the Brooklyn Bridge elephant stampede occurred on the same day as the Wall Street crash of 1929.
