= Staten Island Ferry =

Passenger ferry service in New York City

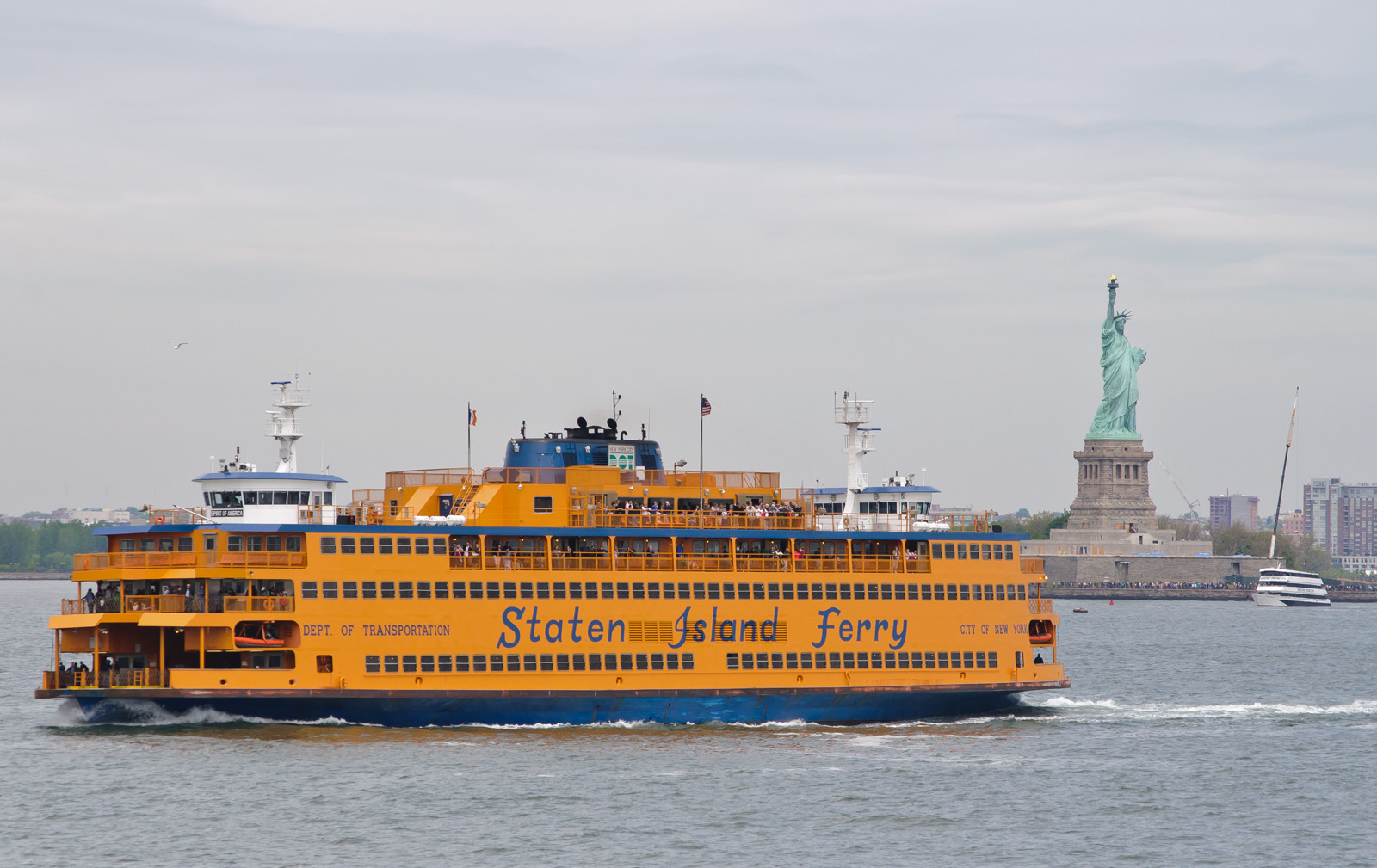
- Locale: Staten Island and Manhattan, New York City
- Waterway: Upper New York Bay
- Transit type: Passenger ferry
- Operator: New York City Department of Transportation
- Began operation: 1817; 209 years ago
- System length: 5.2 mi (8.4 km)
- No. of lines: 1
- No. of vessels: 9
- No. of terminals: 2 (Whitehall, St. George)
- Yearly ridership: 16,692,900 (2025)
- Connections at Whitehall Terminal
- Train: at South Ferry; at Bowling Green
- Bus: M15, M15 SBS, M20, M55, Downtown Connection
- Connections at St. George Terminal
- Ship: NYC Ferry SG Route
- Bus: S40, S42, S44, S46, S48, S51, S52, S61, S62, S66, S74, S76, S78

The Staten Island Ferry is a fare-free passenger ferry route operated by the New York City Department of Transportation. The ferry's single route runs 5.2 miles (8.4 km) through New York Harbor between the New York City boroughs of Manhattan and Staten Island, with ferry boats completing the trip in about 25 minutes. The ferry operates 24 hours a day and 7 days a week, with boats leaving every 15 to 20 minutes during peak hours and every 30 minutes at other times. Apart from NYC Ferry's St. George route, it is the only direct mass-transit connection between the two boroughs. Historically, the Staten Island Ferry has charged a relatively low fare compared to other modes of transit in the area; and since 1997, the route has been fare-free. The Staten Island Ferry is one of several ferry systems in the New York City area and is operated separately from systems like NYC Ferry and NY Waterway.

The Staten Island Ferry route terminates at Whitehall Terminal, on Whitehall Street in Lower Manhattan, and at St. George Terminal, in St. George, Staten Island. At Whitehall, connections are available to the New York City Subway and several local New York City Bus routes. At St. George, there are transfers to the Staten Island Railway and to the St. George Bus Terminal's many bus routes. Using OMNY fare cards, passengers from Manhattan can exit a subway or bus on Whitehall Street, take the ferry for free, and have a free second transfer to a train or bus at St. George. Conversely, passengers from Staten Island can freely transfer to a subway or bus in Manhattan after riding the ferry.

The Staten Island Ferry originated in 1817 when the Richmond Turnpike Company started a steamboat service from Manhattan to Staten Island. Cornelius Vanderbilt bought the Richmond Turnpike Company in 1838, and it was merged with two competitors in 1853. The combined company was in turn sold to the Staten Island Railroad Company in 1864. The Staten Island Ferry was then sold to the Baltimore and Ohio Railroad in 1884, and the government of New York City assumed control of the ferry in 1905.

In the early 20th century, the city and private companies also operated ferry routes from Staten Island to Brooklyn. Owing to the growth of vehicular travel, all of the routes from Staten Island to Brooklyn were decommissioned by the mid-1960s; but popular demand preserved the route to Manhattan. By 1967, the Staten Island-to-Manhattan ferry was the only commuter ferry within the entire city. A fast ferry route from Staten Island to Midtown Manhattan ran briefly from 1997 to 1998; proposals to revive the route resurfaced in the 2010s and materialized in the 2021 launch of the parallel NYC Ferry route.

With 16,692,900 riders in 2025, the Staten Island Ferry is the busiest ferry route in the United States and the world's busiest passenger-only ferry system, thanks largely to the lack of other transit connections between Staten Island and the other boroughs. The ferry is also popular among tourists and visitors due to the free-of-charge views of the New York Harbor a trip provides. The ferry has been featured in several films.

== History ==
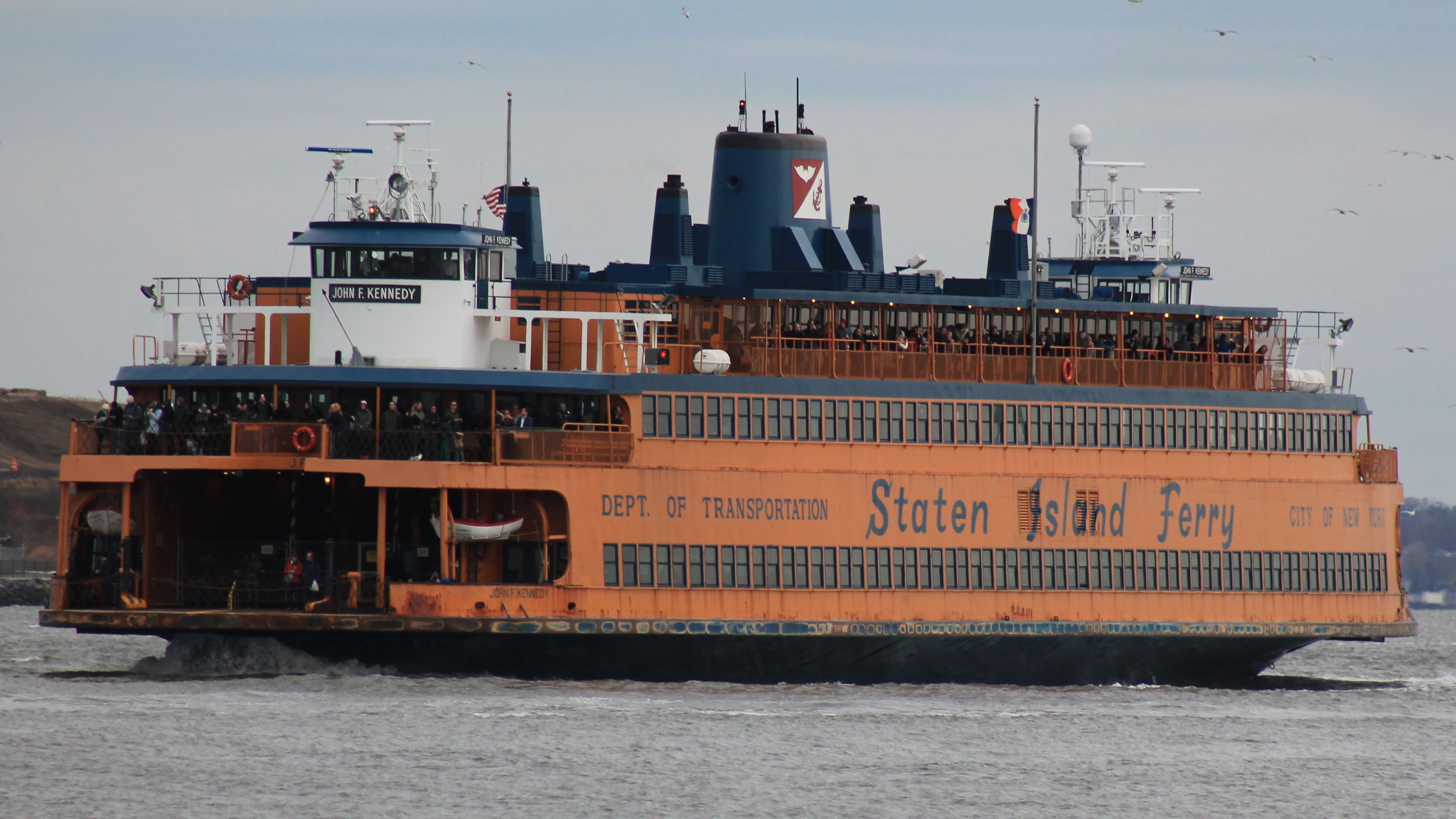
The MV John F. Kennedy

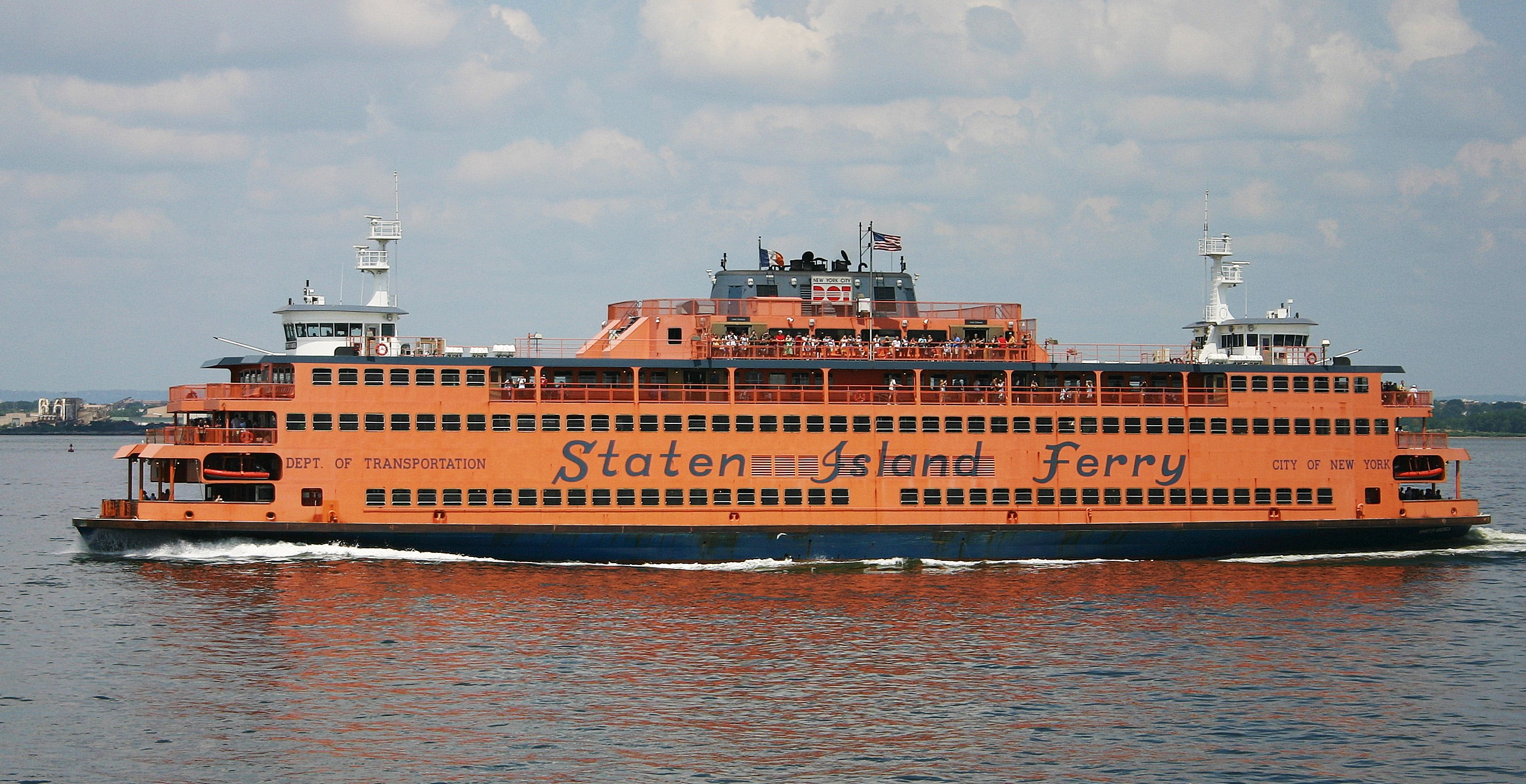
The MV Spirit of America

=== Predecessors ===
Before the New York City area was colonized by Europeans, the indigenous Lenape Native Americans used boats to traverse waterways—including present-day Arthur Kill, Kill Van Kull, and Raritan Bay—of the area then known as Lenapehoking, which included present-day Staten Island, Manhattan, and New Jersey. The area would first be colonized as part of Dutch New Netherland in 1624. New Netherland became the British Province of New York in 1664, and the British province finally became part of the United States in 1776. During the 18th century, the City of New York occupied only the southern tip of Manhattan, and Staten Island was not incorporated within the greater city. At the time, ferry service along New York Harbor between Staten Island and Manhattan was conducted by private individuals in "periaugers". These shallow-draft, two-masted sailboats, used for local traffic in New York Harbor, were also used for other transport in the area.

=== Early years ===
Cornelius Vanderbilt, an entrepreneur from Stapleton, Staten Island, who would become one of the world's richest people, started a ferry service from Staten Island to Manhattan in 1810. Just 16 years old, he had sailed extensively enough in his father's periauger that he could easily navigate the New York Harbor Estuary on his own. He was given $100 for his birthday in May 1810, which he used to purchase a periauger called Swiftsure. Vanderbilt used his boat to transport passengers from Staten Island to the Battery at Manhattan's tip. He competed against other boatmen providing service in the harbor, who called him "Commodore" because of his youthful eagerness; although the nickname was intended to be jocular, it applied to him for the rest of his life. The War of 1812 meant restricted access to New York Harbor from elsewhere along the East Coast. During the war, Vanderbilt profited from carrying cargo along the Hudson River, and he bought extra boats with these profits. After the war, he transported cargo in the harbor, earning even more money and buying more boats.

Around the same time, US Vice President Daniel D. Tompkins secured a charter for the Richmond Turnpike Company as part of his efforts to develop the village of Tompkinsville, which would become Staten Island's first European settlement. The company was incorporated in 1815, and the land comprising Tompkinsville was purchased around this time. The company built a highway across Staten Island; it also received the right to run a ferry to New York. The Richmond Turnpike Company began to operate the first motorized ferry between New York and Staten Island in 1817, Nautilus, which was commanded by Captain John DeForest, the brother-in-law of Cornelius Vanderbilt. This new ferry broke the short monopoly on steamboat operations that had been held by the Fulton Ferry, which had connected Manhattan and Brooklyn since it began operation in 1814. Since the steamboats provided much faster means of transportation across the harbor, Vanderbilt sold all his ships to his father in 1818. He subsequently started working for Thomas Gibbons, a small-steamboat operator, operating steamboat lines for Gibbons in New Jersey before later operating his own lines in New York.

When Tompkins died in 1825, the company's stocks were placed in a trust at the Fulton Bank in lower Manhattan. Under an act passed in 1824, the bank was to be incorporated under two conditions: it had to acquire the Richmond Turnpike Company's stock, and it would cease operations in 1844. Vanderbilt, who had grown wealthy in the steamboat business in New York waters, bought control of the Richmond Turnpike Company in 1838. After the company's original charter expired in 1844, Vanderbilt transferred the former company's leases and titles to himself and the company's other chief officer, Oroondates Mauran. This was done in their capacity as private citizens rather than as chief officers. When Mauran died in 1848, his share of the company was purchased by Vanderbilt.

By the mid-18th century, there were three separate ferry companies offering services between lower Manhattan and the eastern shore of Staten Island. The Tompkins and Staples Ferry, operated by Vice President Tompkins's son Minthorne, ran from a pier at the Tompkinsville end of the highway to Whitehall Street in lower Manhattan. The New York and Staten Island Steam Ferry Company, or "People's Ferry", was operated by George Law and ran from Stapleton, Staten Island, to Liberty Street, Manhattan. The third ferry was the Richmond Turnpike Ferry, also the "Staten Island Ferry"; it originated at Vanderbilt's Landing at Clifton, Staten Island, and terminated in Manhattan. All of these companies merged in 1853, after Vanderbilt, who was focused on business ventures elsewhere, convinced Law and Tompkins to buy out his ferry company for $600,000. Vanderbilt remained a dominant figure in the ferry business until the Civil War in the early 1860s.

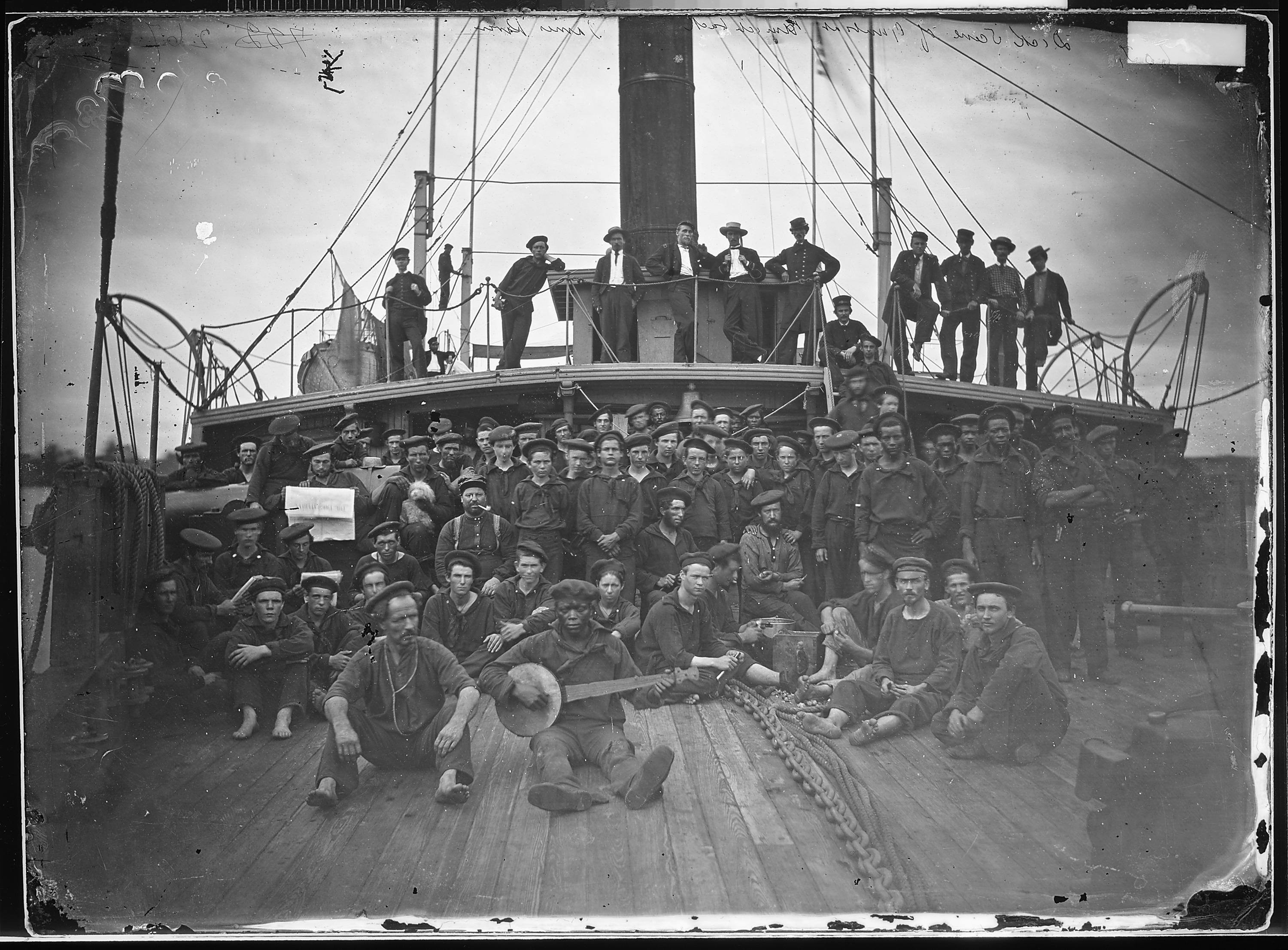
Hunchback (1864–1865) on the James River in Virginia during the Civil War

The combined company, the Staten Island and New York Ferry Company, ran services from Whitehall Street to Tompkinsville, Stapleton, and Clifton. It originally ran single-ended boats but eventually expanded its fleet to include double-ended boats. The Staten Island and New York Ferry's vessel Hunchback was built in 1852, becoming the first double-decked boat to operate in the harbor. To accommodate growing ridership, three double-ended boats—Southfield I, Westfield I, and Clifton I—were purchased for the ferry between 1857 and 1861. Westfield and Clifton were purchased by the Union Army in September 1861, almost immediately after they had been delivered. The army also purchased Hunchback and Southfield in December of that year. The Union used the ships to man the blockade against the Confederate Army during the Civil War. Of the four boats, only Hunchback survived; after the war, it was redocumented and bought by someone in Boston; it was abandoned by 1880. Due to the loss of these boats, another three boats—Westfield II, Northfield, and Middletown—were obtained in 1862–1863. A fourth boat, Clifton II, was also built, but it was purchased by the US shortly after completion; the vessel was then redocumented, and by 1868 it had been destroyed.

=== Staten Island Railway era ===
The Staten Island Railway (SIR) opened in stages in 1860. It was necessary to have a direct connection between the new railroad trains and the infrequent ferries to and from Manhattan, but this turned out to be difficult during the beginning of operation. The ferries serving Vanderbilt's Landing were owned by George Law, who operated a competing ferry service called the New York and Staten Island Steam Ferry. Afterwards, Vanderbilt tried to operate a ferry service between Manhattan and Staten Island that would rival Law's ferry service. Vanderbilt started construction on his plan for a central dock on the island, but he abandoned the scheme after a storm destroyed the timber work. Only the large stone foundation remained; this was still visible in 1900 at low tide.

A long franchise battle ensued; and as a result, Vanderbilt sold his ferry service to Law in 1862. Vanderbilt subsequently lost interest in Staten Island's transit operations, and he handed the operations of the ferry and railroad over to his brother, Jacob Vanderbilt, who was the president of the company until 1883. In March 1864, Vanderbilt bought Law's ferries, bringing both the railroad and the ferries under the same company. The railway assumed the Staten Island and New York Ferry Company's operations in 1865.

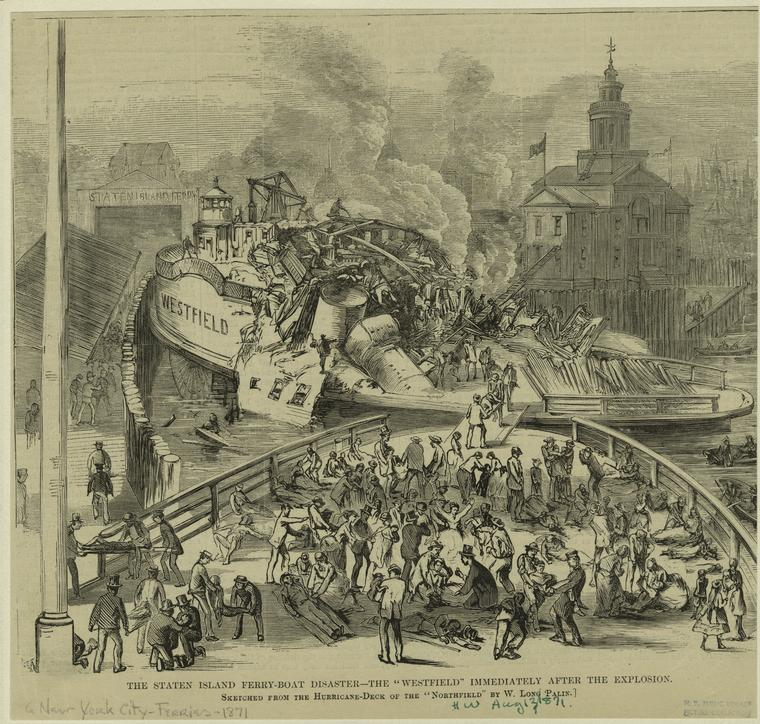
The 'Westfield immediately after the explosion

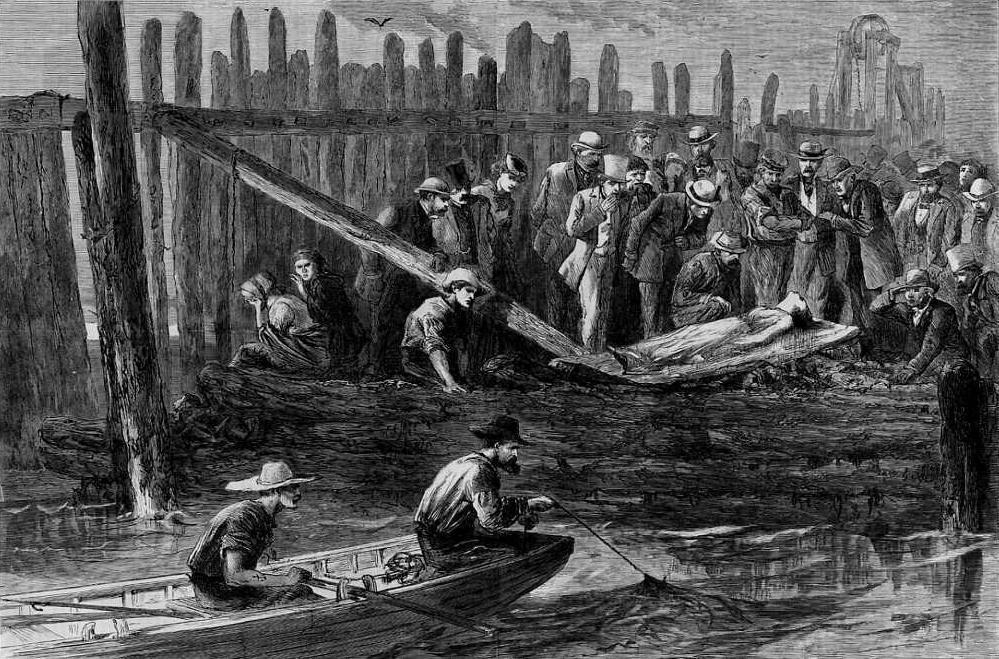
Westfield disaster, recovering the bodies

On July 30, 1871, Westfield II was damaged when its boiler exploded while sitting in its slip at South Ferry in Manhattan. Within days of the disaster, between 45 and 91 had died, and from 78 to 208 listed as injured, although figures varied widely between the Times, Herald, Tribune, and World. Among those injured was Antonio Meucci, an Italian immigrant who was developing the first telephone at the time; he was so poor that his wife sold his lab and telephone prototype to buy $6 worth of medications. Jacob Vanderbilt was arrested for murder, though he escaped conviction. This had an adverse effect on the railroad's finances; and on March 28, 1872, the railway and the ferry went into receivership. On September 17, 1872, the property of the company was sold to George Law in foreclosure, with the exception of the ferryboat Westfield II, which was purchased by Horace Theall.

Erastus Wiman, a Canadian entrepreneur, planned to develop Staten Island by adding transit. Wiman had become one of Staten Island's most notable figures since moving to New York in 1867, and he had built an amusement area on the island to help develop it. He incorporated the Staten Island Rapid Transit Railroad Company on March 25, 1880; and the incorporation of the company was formalized on April 14, 1880. Two years later, Wiman applied to build a ferry dock in Manhattan in order to serve his new ferry routes. Wiman also proposed combining the six to eight separate ferry operations so as to use just one Staten Island terminal. This became the St. George ferry landing, which opened in March 1886.

On April 3, 1883, the Staten Island Rapid Transit Railroad Company gained control of the SIR and its boats. A new boat, Southfield II, was delivered that year. The Baltimore & Ohio Railroad (B&O) obtained control of the Staten Island Railway Ferry Company's operations the next year. A controlling interest in the Railway Ferry Company was obtained by the B&O in 1885, through purchases of stock. On November 21, 1885, Robert Garrett, president of the B&O, leased the Railway Ferry Company to the B&O for 99 years. The B&O could now provide service to a ferry terminal that was closer to Manhattan public transit. Formerly, passengers had to transfer to the Central Railroad of New Jersey (CNJ)'s ferries, which went from the Jersey City Terminal to the Liberty Street Ferry Terminal in Manhattan; and the latter was not close to any elevated rail stations in the area. With this acquisition, the B&O could start operating ferries to the Whitehall Street terminal, where there was a direct transfer to an elevated station. Two 225-foot (69 m) steel-hulled ferryboats were built during this time and delivered in 1888. These boats were Erastus Wiman (renamed Castleton in 1894) and Robert Garrett. They were the first boats of the Staten Island Railway Ferry fleet to be powered by multi-cylinder inclined steam engines, which pumped steam more efficiently than the single-cylinder vertical engines on previous boats.

Garrett resigned from his position at the B&O in 1887, and his successors did not show as much interest in Staten Island transit operations. Wiman lost significant amounts of money in the Panic of 1893; and two years later, much of his property was auctioned to pay off debts.

In 1893, the B&O commenced plans to divert some CNJ ferries from Jersey City to Whitehall Street, with the latter ordering Easton and Mauch Chunk ferries for the Whitehall Street service. The boats started running in 1897. As part of a general improvement, the B&O also started building a new ferry terminal at St. George in 1895.

In 1899, the Pennsylvania Railroad (PRR) and the New York Central Railroad (NYCRR) formed a partnership in which they were to buy smaller freight railroad companies. PRR president Alexander Cassatt had devised the plan because he thought that two large freight-shipping companies, Standard Oil and Carnegie Steel, were artificially depressing freight-shipping rates by cajoling smaller companies for rebates. Among the PRR's acquisitions was the B&O, which in turn owned the Staten Island Railway and Ferry. Cassatt started buying B&O stock in 1899 and owned much of the B&O stock two years later.

=== End of Staten Island Railway era ===
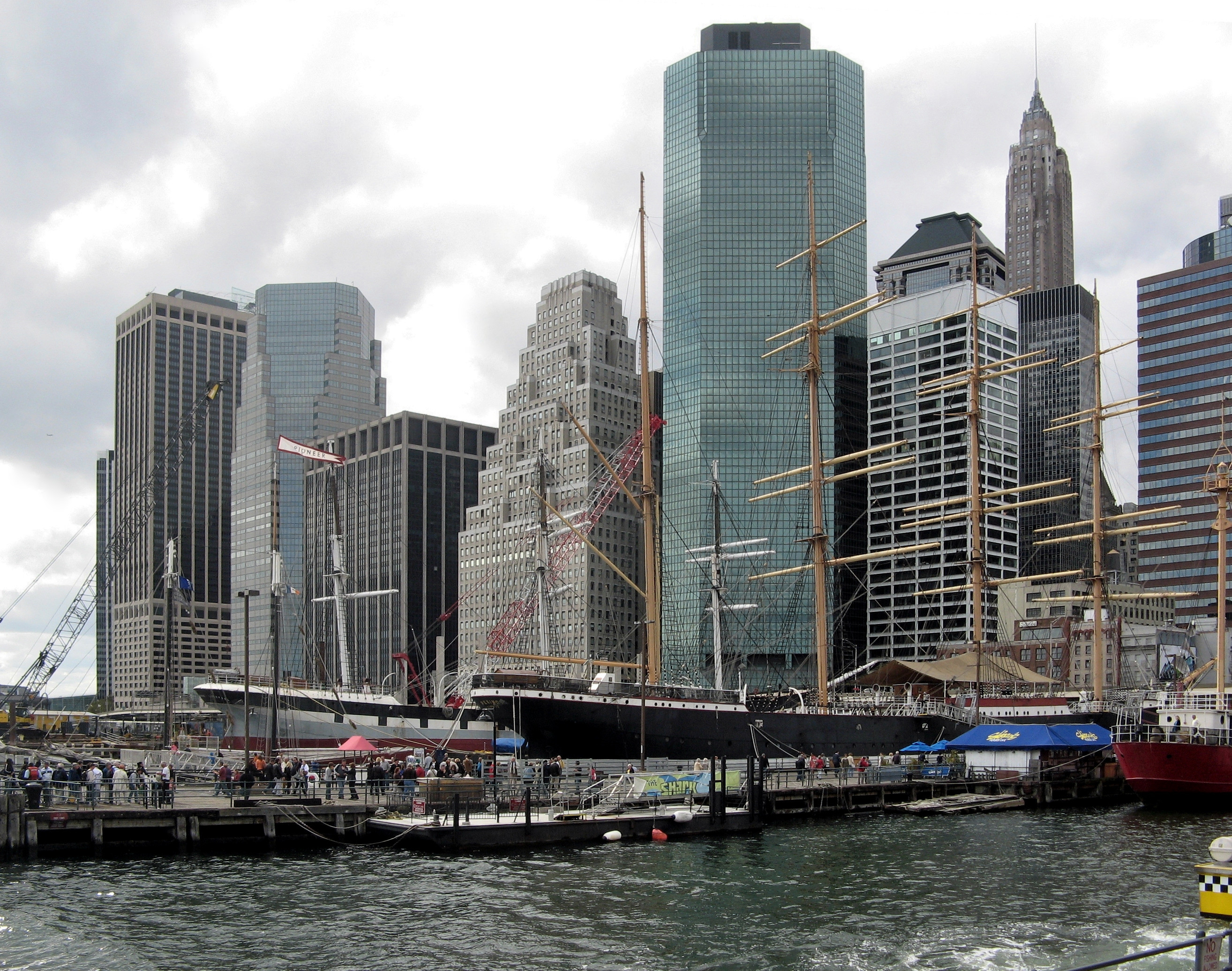
The South Street Seaport, where the damaged Northfield II sank

By the 1900s, Staten Islanders were becoming dissatisfied with the railway-operated ferry service to Manhattan, which they felt was unsafe. The turning point came on June 14, 1901, when the CNJ ferry Mauch Chunk struck the B&O ferryboat Northfield II as the latter was leaving the ferry port at Whitehall, tearing a 10-by-20-foot (3.0 by 6.1 m) hole through the middle of Northfield. Damaged beyond repair, Northfield II sank within ten minutes, ending up near the modern South Street Seaport. Out of 995 passengers aboard, only four or five were killed. The dead were not recovered for several days, and one man's body drifted around the southern tip of Manhattan and across the Hudson River. An investigation into the crash found that Northfield II had sunk because of the extent of the damage rather than because of its 38-year age. Despite this, neither captain was criminally charged, although Mauch Chunk's captain was "censured" for speeding as well as for not helping the passengers aboard Northfield. In the meantime, the B&O borrowed the paddle-wheeler John Englis from the Williamsburg Ferry Company.

On February 21, 1902, two hundred people held discussions with MacDougal Hawkes, the head of the New York City Department of Docks, to demand that the Whitehall-to-St. George ferry service be improved. In summer 1902, as the B&O fought to retain its ownership of the ferry, Henry Huttleston Rogers demonstrated that his steam-powered yacht was faster than the SIR's vessels, and argued that he should thus be allowed to operate the ferry route. Throughout the rest of the year, Rogers's Standard Oil-affiliated transit venture, which also operated streetcar routes on Staten Island, competed with the B&O for the rights to the ferry. The locations of the Staten Island terminal were also debated; and West Brighton, Tompkinsville, Stapleton, and Port Richmond were suggested as possible locations. The B&O wanted to offer service to St. George and at least one other terminal, while Rogers wanted to use only the Tompkinsville and West Brighton terminals. The two groups submitted their proposals in November 1902; and by February 1903, the Sinking Fund Commission announced their decision to give B&O the operating license. This decision proved controversial: Hawkes made a recommendation to Mayor Seth Low on February 21, and dissatisfied Staten Islanders showed up to the commission's meeting on February 25. These residents, voicing their dissent, helped cause the commissioners to reject Hawkes's proposal.

Shortly after, the government of New York City announced its intent to acquire ownership of the ferry. Instead of offering the franchise to either the B&O or Rogers, the Sinking Fund Commission decided, in March 1903, that the city could run two ferry routes from Staten Island. One route would travel to Manhattan, terminating at any North River port between 23rd Street and Battery Park, while the other route would go from Staten Island to 39th Street, near Bush Terminal, in Sunset Park, Brooklyn. The bill authorizing the city to acquire ferry operations was passed by the 126th New York State Legislature, and it was signed into law by Governor Benjamin B. Odell in May 1903. The city would pay $3.2 million to take over operations of the ferry, including $2 million for five new screw-propelled ships, one named for each of the five boroughs. The city began soliciting tenders for ferryboats, ultimately deciding to pay $1.7 million for four of the five boats from the Maryland Steel Company. The contract was signed on June 20, 1904. The fifth boat, Richmond, was built on Staten Island by the Burlee Dry Dock Company.

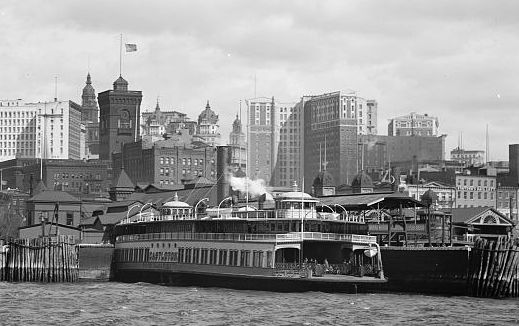
The ferryboat Castleton at the Whitehall Street terminal

From 1902 to 1903, there were debates on where to put the new Whitehall terminal; and Whitehall Street was decided on as the best location. In 1904, after the Staten Island Railway Company refused the city's offer of $500,000 for the two terminals, the city started a process to condemn the land around the terminals. Although the B&O had been set to give up the Staten Island Ferry franchise in early 1904, the new borough-class ferryboats were not ready by that time. So, the B&O was granted a two-year contract extension, on the condition that the contract could be canceled with 30 days' notice. In return, the city could purchase the B&O's ownership share in the terminals and the five existing ships from B&O, namely Westfield II, Middletown, Southfield II, Robert Garrett, and Castleton, for a set price. A new St. George Terminal was built by the city for $2,318,720, replacing the existing terminal.

All of the ships except for Richmond were finished by April 1905 and delivered during the late summer and early fall of that year. Richmond was ready by May 20; and as it had been built in Port Richmond, there was no need to transport the boat. On October 25, 1905, the Department of Docks and Ferries assumed ownership of the ferry and terminals; and the borough ferryboats started their maiden voyages. The next year, the city took ownership of the five B&O ships.

=== City ownership and ferries to other destinations ===
==== 1900s and 1910s ====
The ferry service from St. George to 39th Street in Sunset Park, Brooklyn, became city-operated on November 1, 1906, as provided for by the 1903 law transferring ownership of that route to the city. Its Brooklyn terminus was located near the Brooklyn, Bath and West End Railroad's former 39th Street terminal, but as that railroad had been converted into the West End subway line, the Brooklyn ferry now primarily served industrial interests in Sunset Park. Mayor George McClellan, elected as Low's successor in 1903, and Docks Commissioner Maurice Featherson were initially skeptical of the acquisition; but despite their objections, the Sinking Funds Commission approved the private line's acquisition in 1905. The route started with three ferryboats from the Union Ferry Company of Brooklyn. Three new boats were then commissioned for the 39th Street route. Named Gowanus, Bay Ridge, and Nassau, they were smaller than the borough-class boats. Bay Ridge was the first to arrive, in July 1907, followed by Gowanus in August, and Bay Ridge in September. A second route from St. George to Brooklyn started operating on July 4, 1912. The privately operated Brooklyn & Richmond Ferry Company operated the service to 69th Street in Bay Ridge.

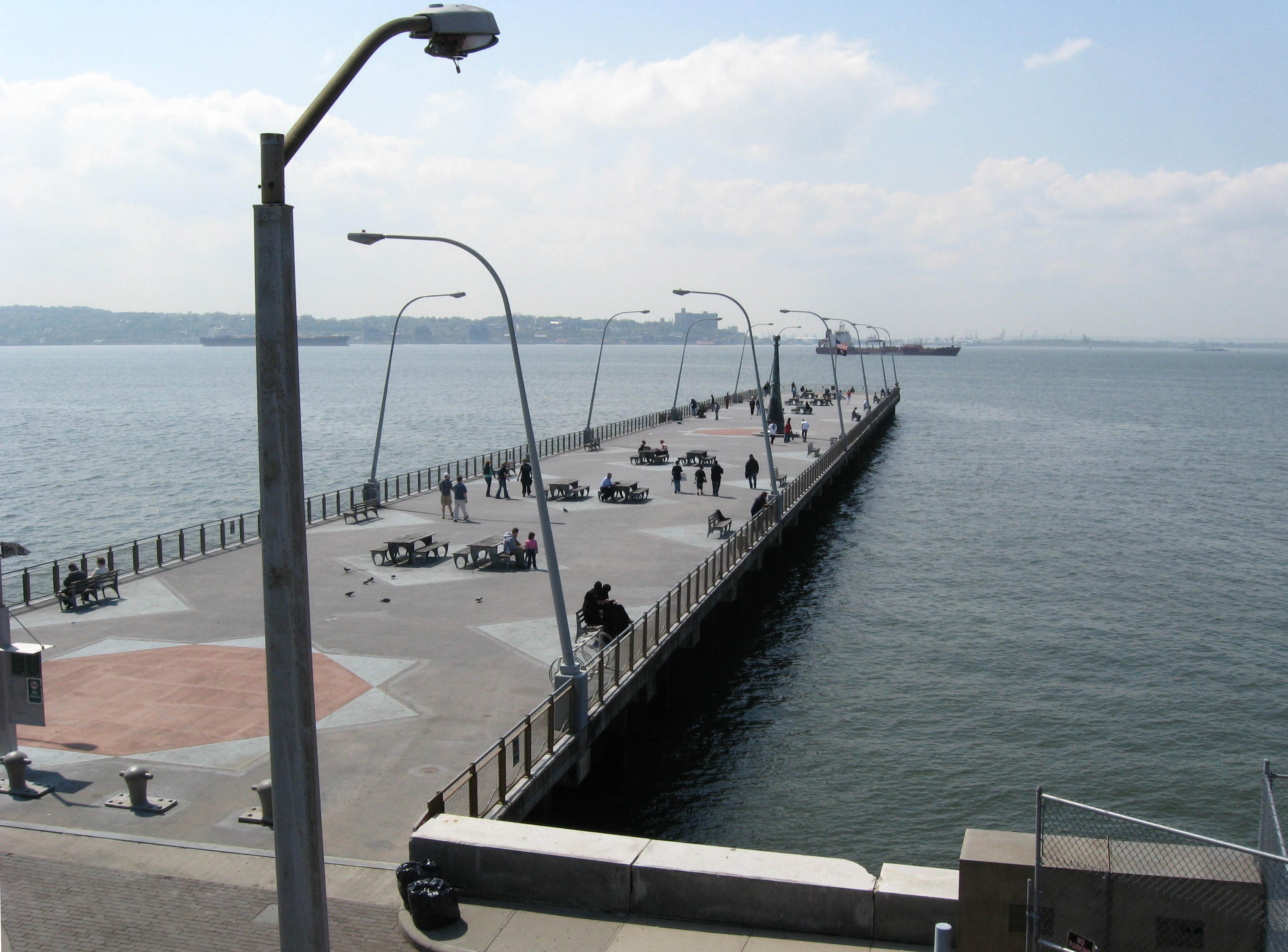
Former pier for 69th Street ferry service

New York City started operating a line from Battery Park to Stapleton in May 1909. This service ran every 90 minutes between 4 a.m. and 8 p.m. daily. It was discontinued at the end of 1913, due to low ridership. Staten Islanders protested against the city's discontinuance of the Stapleton ferry, to no avail.

Mayor McClellan's successor, William Jay Gaynor, was opposed to what he saw as a hasty purchase of the 39th Street line. Upon becoming mayor in 1910, Gaynor communicated to his administration's docks commissioner, Calvin Tompkins, that the operating costs of that route needed to be reduced; in response, Tompkins replaced the superintendent of ferries. Neither of the city's Staten Island ferries showed a profit until 1915, under John Purroy Mitchel's mayoral administration. The city's purchase of the two Staten Island ferry routes was intended to be temporary, until private operators could be found, but it never happened. These were the only two routes the city operated at the time, but the city continued to award privately operated ferry franchises elsewhere.

The ferryboat Mayor Gaynor was delivered in 1914, during Mitchel's administration, to boost service on the Whitehall route, although it had originally been intended for the Sunset Park route. It was not as efficient as the borough-class boats (see § Former), so it was relegated to supplementary service. Another vessel in the fleet, Castleton, was sold to a private owner in 1915; its classmate, Robert Garrett (renamed Stapleton in 1906) would remain in city ownership until 1922.

==== 1920s to early 1940s ====
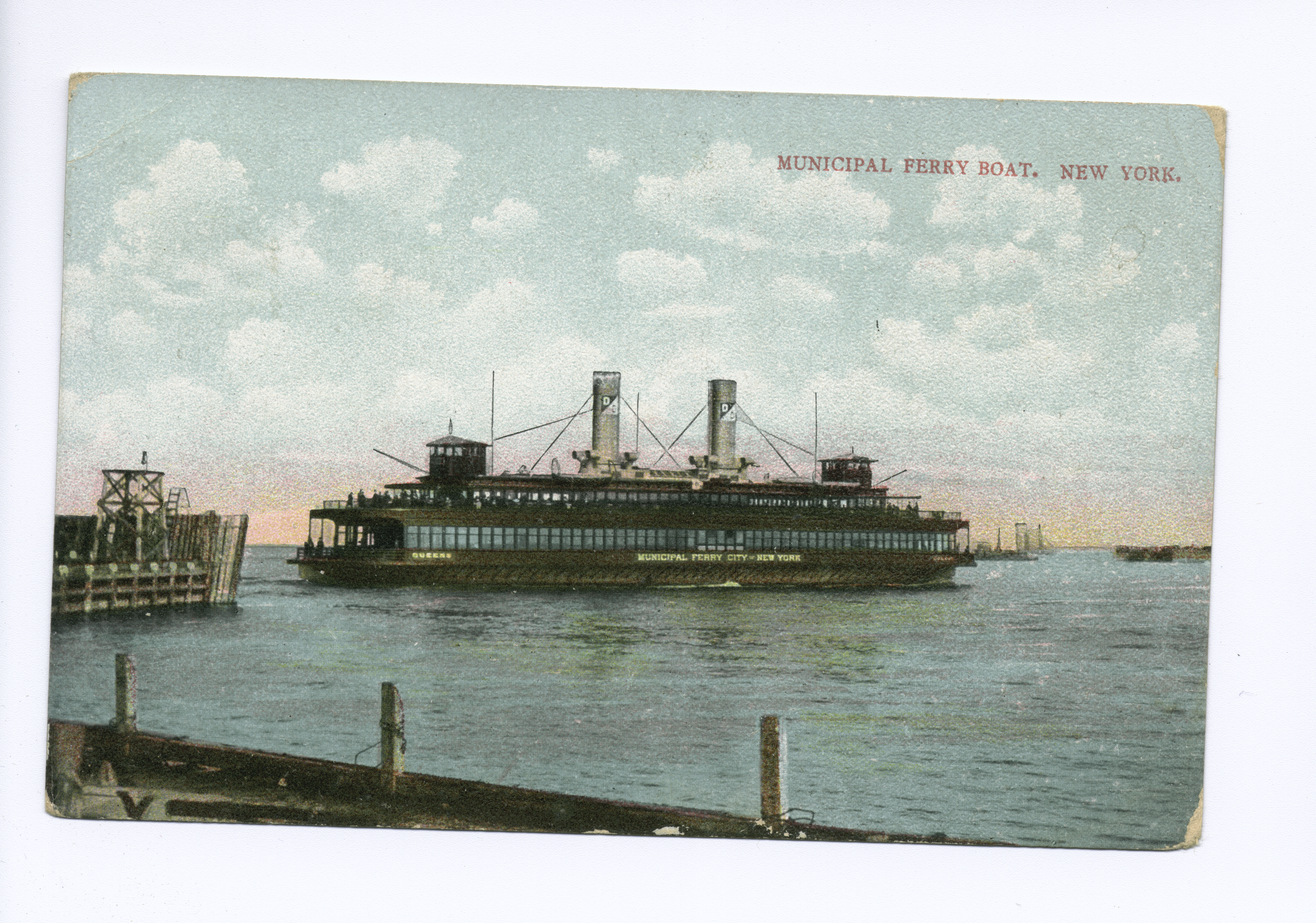
Maroon color scheme

Mayor Mitchel's successor, John Francis Hylan, commissioned a series of new boats after he was elected in 1917. President Roosevelt (also known as T.R.) was delivered in 1921, and American Legion was delivered five years later. The names of both boats triggered some controversy—President Roosevelt due to resentment of Theodore Roosevelt, and American Legion due to the fact that it was named after the American Legion, which was only one of the various veterans' organizations in existence. At the same time, Hylan also ordered three more boats for the 39th Street route, and he ordered 11 boats for other city-operated routes. This brought the number of boats ordered by Hylan's administration to 16. After Hylan's electoral defeat by Jimmy Walker in 1925, George W. Loft and William Randolph Hearst were respectively renamed to West Brighton and Whitehall II. In April 1926, the white paint scheme of the boats was replaced by a maroon scheme, which was better at hiding the accumulations of grime on the boats' exteriors.

In March 1924, New York City Plant and Structures Commissioner Grover A. Whalen suggested that the infrequent 69th Street service be placed under city administration, a request that ultimately went unfulfilled, as the Brooklyn & Richmond Ferry would continue to operate the route until 1939. However, in June 1924, the route to 39th Street was taken over by New York Bay Ferry. By the end of that summer, the three ferry routes were advertised as the most convenient way to get to Staten Island until a tunnel between Staten Island and Brooklyn could be completed, although the tunnel never was finished because its construction was halted a year later. In the 1930s, the ferry routes to Whitehall Street and 39th Street each received one class of three new boats. The boats in the Dongan Hills class were delivered from 1929 to 1931 for the 39th Street route, and the boats in the Mary Murray class were delivered from 1937 to 1938 for the Whitehall Street route. The classes' engines and dimensions were similar, but each class's exterior appearance was very different from the other.

The Brooklyn & Richmond Ferry Company found it increasingly difficult to maintain its aging fleet, especially with the competition from the 39th Street ferry's new, problem-free ferryboats. This resulted in infrequent service on the Bay Ridge ferry to 69th Street, which led to a decline in patronage and fare revenues. In February 1939, the United States Department of Commerce ordered the Brooklyn & Richmond Ferry Company to cease all operations after finding that one of its 40-year-old boats was in a severely deteriorated condition. The Bay Ridge operation was subsequently taken over by the Electric Ferries company on March 1, 1939. Electric Ferries, which also operated other routes in the area, bought three secondhand ferryboats from other companies to supplement seven new boats. In 1940, the Brooklyn & Richmond Ferry Company asked the city to stop its municipal operation to 39th Street, so the 69th Street ferry could carry all Staten Island-to-Brooklyn traffic, thus enabling them to lower rates. The city refused.

==== Mid-1940s and 1950s ====
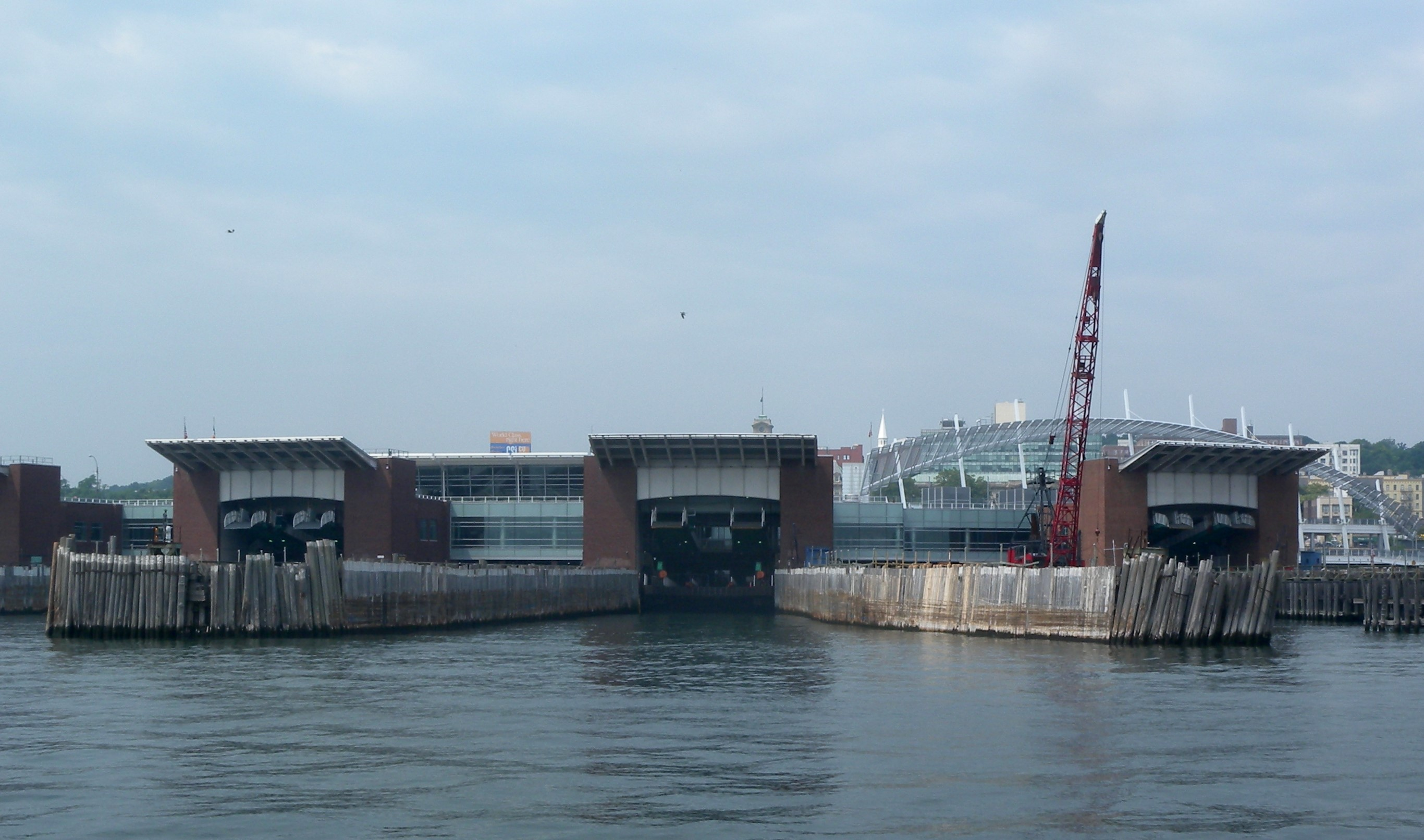
The St. George Terminal, reconstructed in 1951

After the end of World War II in 1945, the city wanted to reconstruct St. George Terminal, which would in turn improve ferry service to Whitehall Street. On June 25, 1946, a fire occurred at St. George, killing three people and destroying the slips for the Whitehall ferry route. The only ferry slips that had not been damaged in the fire were those used by the 39th Street ferry. Because the Whitehall route had more ridership, the 39th Street ferry service was suspended so that Whitehall ferries could stop at St. George. The suspension of ferry service was supposed to be temporary; but when service was still suspended after a year had elapsed, merchants at Brooklyn's Bush Terminal, near 39th Street, began petitioning the city to resume service. However, this service was apparently never resumed. The new terminal was completed in June 1951.

From 1950 to 1951, the city ordered the construction of three new Merrell-class boats for the Whitehall Street route. These boats differed significantly from their predecessors in that they used 6-cylinder "Unaflow" engines, which allowed for a more efficient steam-powered ferryboat compared to the two 2-cylinder compound steam engines of earlier models. With the lowest bid for the three boats coming in at $6.44 million, the Merrell class was more expensive than the Mary Murray class before it, which had cost only $1 million a boat. The Merrell class would quickly become outdated with the introduction of a subsequent class whose diesel engines were even more powerful.

Around this time, ferry services in the area were being discontinued and replaced by bridges and tunnels, leading to the eventual demise of the 69th Street ferry. The exception was the direct ferry from Manhattan to Staten Island, which was not expected to see a significant decrease in ridership because it provided the only direct link between the two boroughs. Electric Ferries' franchise for the Bay Ridge ferry expired on March 31, 1954; and the city contracted the 69th Street ferry's operation to Henry Shanks to keep that ferry running. The 69th Street ferry ceased operation in 1964 after the Verrazzano–Narrows Bridge opened a short distance to the south; service on that route would not be restored until the expansion of NYC Ferry in 2025. At the time of the 69th Street ferry's discontinuation, it was being used by 7,000 passengers daily, who paid five cents each, and 8,000 vehicles daily, which were charged 75 cents apiece. Each boat could fit between 500 and 750 passengers but only 42 vehicles, which meant for traffic jams at both of the ferry's slips, due to the boats' low capacity. The route between St. George and Whitehall was kept open, since the bridge's opening was expected to spur an influx of residents to Staten Island, with a potential increase in commute ridership on the ferry to Manhattan.

=== Reduction to a single ferry line ===
==== 1960s to 1990s ====
By 1967, all other ferries in New York City had closed due to competition from automobile traffic, and the St. George-to-Whitehall route was the only ferry in the city. It remained as such until the 1980s, when other ferry routes were restarted. Off-peak service was reduced in 1967, but two months later that service was restored. However, due to the mid-1970s New York City fiscal crisis, night service ended on July 1, 1975, with alternate service being provided by the Fourth Avenue subway. Night service was restored in the 1980s after two boats, comprising the current Austen class, were ordered specifically for off-peak and night voyages. These boats entered service in 1986.

By the late 1980s, ferries had again become a popular mode of transport in the area. In 1991, seventy companies expressed interest in bidding for the rights to operate new ferries across the city. This list of potential bidders was reduced to three companies by 1993. One of these ferries was to be a ferry from Staten Island to midtown Manhattan; this new ferry would travel at top speeds of 35 knots (65 km/h; 40 mph), as opposed to the existing Whitehall-to-St. George ferry's 15 knots (28 km/h; 17 mph). New York Fast Ferry was ultimately selected to run a ferry from St. George to East 34th Street in Midtown Manhattan; it opened in January 1997 and saw about 1,650 commuters a day.

The Midtown ferry proved successful until the city essentially eliminated the competing Whitehall Street route's fare in July 1997, as part of the Metropolitan Transportation Authority (MTA)'s "one-city, one-fare" transfer scheme: Staten Island transit riders could pay a single $1.50 fare with a MetroCard on a Staten Island bus or train and get a free transfer to a Manhattan bus or subway by taking the St. George–Whitehall ferry at no additional cost, with return trips handled similarly. As a result, daily ridership on the $5-per-ticket Midtown ferry decreased to 400 passengers, and New York Fast Ferry was unable to make a profit on the route. New York Fast Ferry went out of business at the end of 1997, at which point NY Waterway took over the route. NY Waterway also failed to break even on the Midtown route, and it was eliminated on July 31, 1998. Despite requests from local officials to restore the ferry service, a route from Staten Island to Midtown Manhattan did not run again until August 23, 2021, when NYC Ferry's St. George route began operations.

==== 2000s to present ====
Immediately after the September 11, 2001, attacks, Staten Island ferryboats were used to evacuate attack victims from the World Trade Center. The line was then temporarily closed for a week, with ferry service restored by September 18. When it reopened, some ferries were diverted to Bay Ridge due to the closures of subways and roads across the East River. This continued into 2002, by which time some 2,200 passengers per day were using the ferry, and continued to do so even after the subways and highways were reopened. As a result of the Maritime Transportation Security Act of 2002, all vehicular traffic on the ferry was banned in 2003, and passengers were no longer allowed to board from the lower level of either terminal. Passengers had to board and depart from different sections of the ferry; each terminal's lower level was used by departing passengers, which required boarding passengers to use the upper level. This made boarding the ferry inconvenient for park-and-ride users at the St. George Terminal.

In 2002, the city again proposed eliminating night service, with plans to outsource nighttime operations to other ferry companies in the area. However, night and weekend service was increased in 2004 due to growing ridership. Before the 2004 increase in night service, boats only ran once an hour between midnight and 7 a.m. The ferry had not added more trips during nights and weekends, even though Staten Island's population had increased since 1990. Ridership continued to increase; and in November 2006, additional ferries, running every 30 minutes, were provided during the weekend morning hours. In 2015, weekend-morning and late-night frequencies were increased to every thirty minutes.

The lower levels of each terminal were reopened in 2017 to reduce crowding on the ships' upper levels. The St. George Terminal's lower level was opened during the morning rush, and the Whitehall Terminal's lower level was opened during middays and the evening rush. During March 2020, service frequencies were temporarily decreased to once-hourly service due to an 86% decrease in ridership levels following the spread of the 2020 coronavirus pandemic to New York City. During the pandemic, concession stands aboard each vessel were closed. A longer-term nighttime service cut was announced the next month; the service reduction would remain in effect through at least June 2021, saving $6 million. Full-time service was restored in August 2021. The New York City Department of Transportation and the New York City Economic Development Corporation announced plans in January 2024 to reopen the concession stands on each ferryboat, and they began looking for concessionaires that month. Alcohol sales aboard each ferry, which had been discontinued around the pandemic, were resumed in 2026.

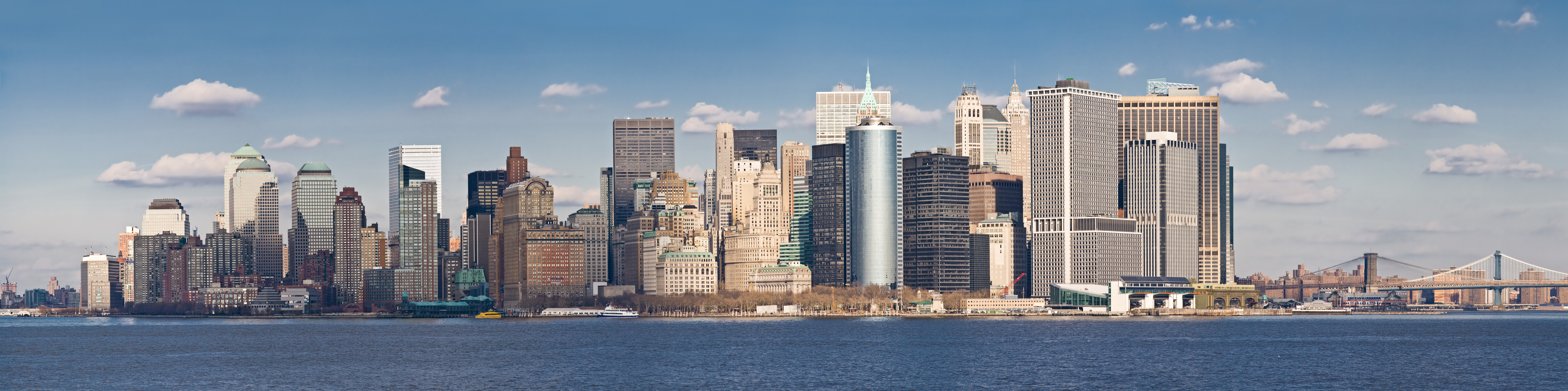
View of the Manhattan skyline from a Whitehall Street-bound ferry in 2006

== Operations ==
The Staten Island Ferry operates 24/7. A new ferry trip begins every 30 minutes most hours of the day and night, with more frequent service during peak times, and takes 25 minutes to complete the 5.2-mile (8.4 km) route. The ferry carried 23.9 million passengers in fiscal year 2016. The Staten Island Ferry is administered separately from NYC Ferry.

=== Route ===
A map showing the route of the ferry through Upper New York Bay

The ferry to Staten Island departs Manhattan from the Staten Island Ferry Whitehall Terminal at South Ferry, at the southernmost tip of Manhattan near the Battery, and follows a single route. On Staten Island, ferryboats to Manhattan depart from the St. George Ferry Terminal on Richmond Terrace, near Richmond County's Borough Hall and Supreme Court.

The ferry ride affords views of the Downtown Jersey City skyline, the Lower Manhattan skyline, Statue of Liberty on Liberty Island, Ellis Island, Governors Island and the Verrazzano–Narrows Bridge. As such it is a popular destination on Saturday nights. The backdrop of the Staten Island Ferry's route also makes it a popular place for film shoots, and the ferry has been featured in various films, such as Working Girl (1988), How to Lose a Guy in 10 Days (2003), and Spider-Man: Homecoming (2017). Many other films and TV episodes use the Staten Island Ferry in establishing shots.

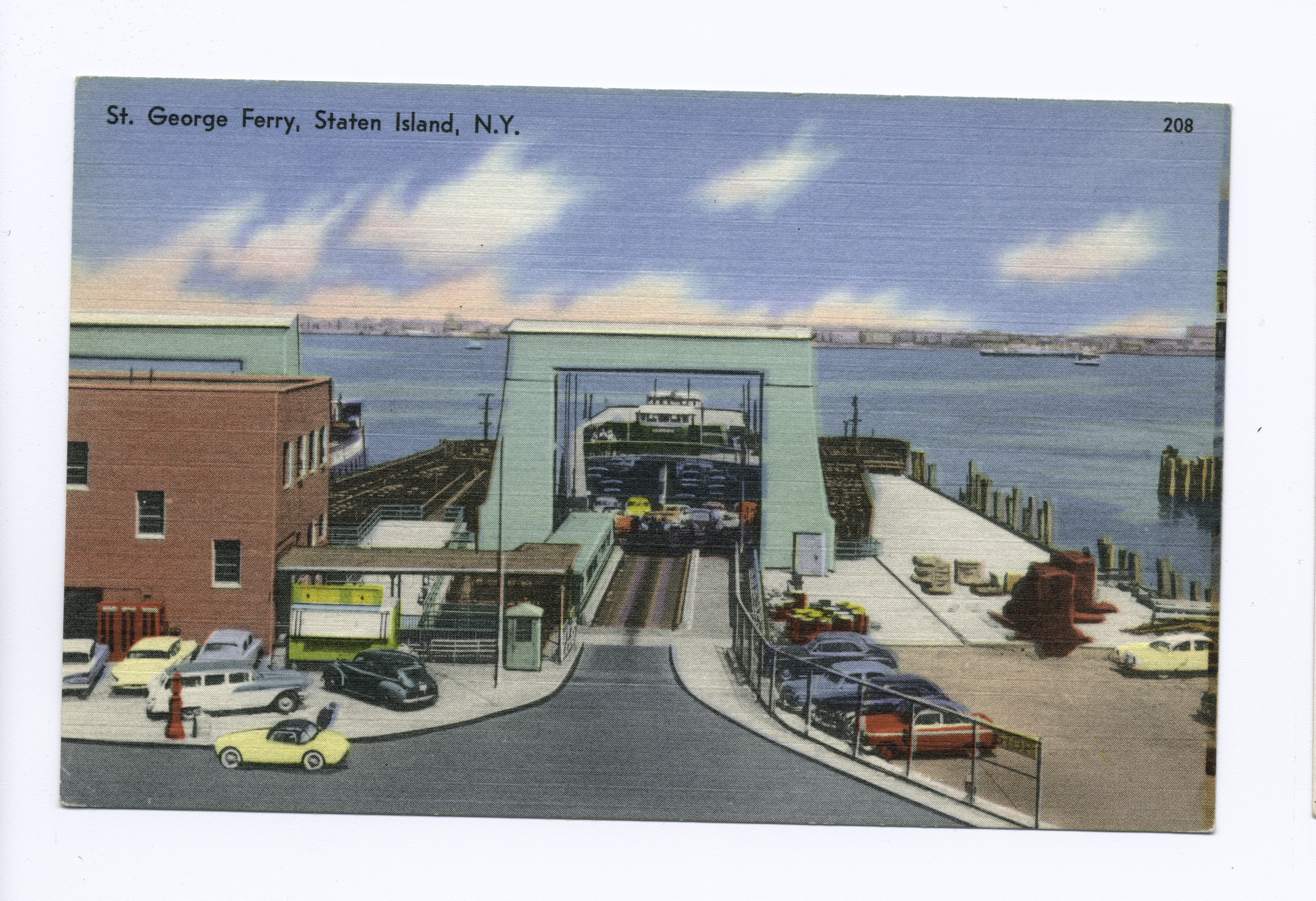
Cars were carried for most of the 20th century

In the past, ferries were equipped for vehicle transport, and operators charged $3 per automobile. A vehicle ban was approved in 1992, after the Whitehall Terminal was destroyed and subsequently rebuilt without vehicle loading areas. Although the temporary terminals included car loading areas, car boarding was discontinued after the September 11 attacks. A plan to reinstate car boarding, because of rising tolls on the Verrazzano Bridge, was seen as infeasible due to the effort needed to screen every car.

While the ferries no longer transport motor vehicles, they do transport bicycles. There is a bicycle entrance to the ferry at both terminals on the ground level so bicyclists can enter the ferry without needing to enter the building. The ground entrance was reserved exclusively for bicyclists until September 2017, when lower-level boarding and disembarking was restored for all passengers. Cyclists are subject to screening upon arrival at the ferry terminals and must dismount and walk their bicycles to the waiting area and onto the boat. Bicycles must be stored in the designated bicycle storage area on each boat.

During rush hours, ferries usually depart every 15 to 20 minutes, with frequency decreasing to every 30 minutes during the mid-days and evenings. Ferries run at 30-minute intervals for a few hours during the early morning—usually 12 a.m. to 6 a.m.—and on weekends.

=== Terminals ===
==== Whitehall Terminal ====
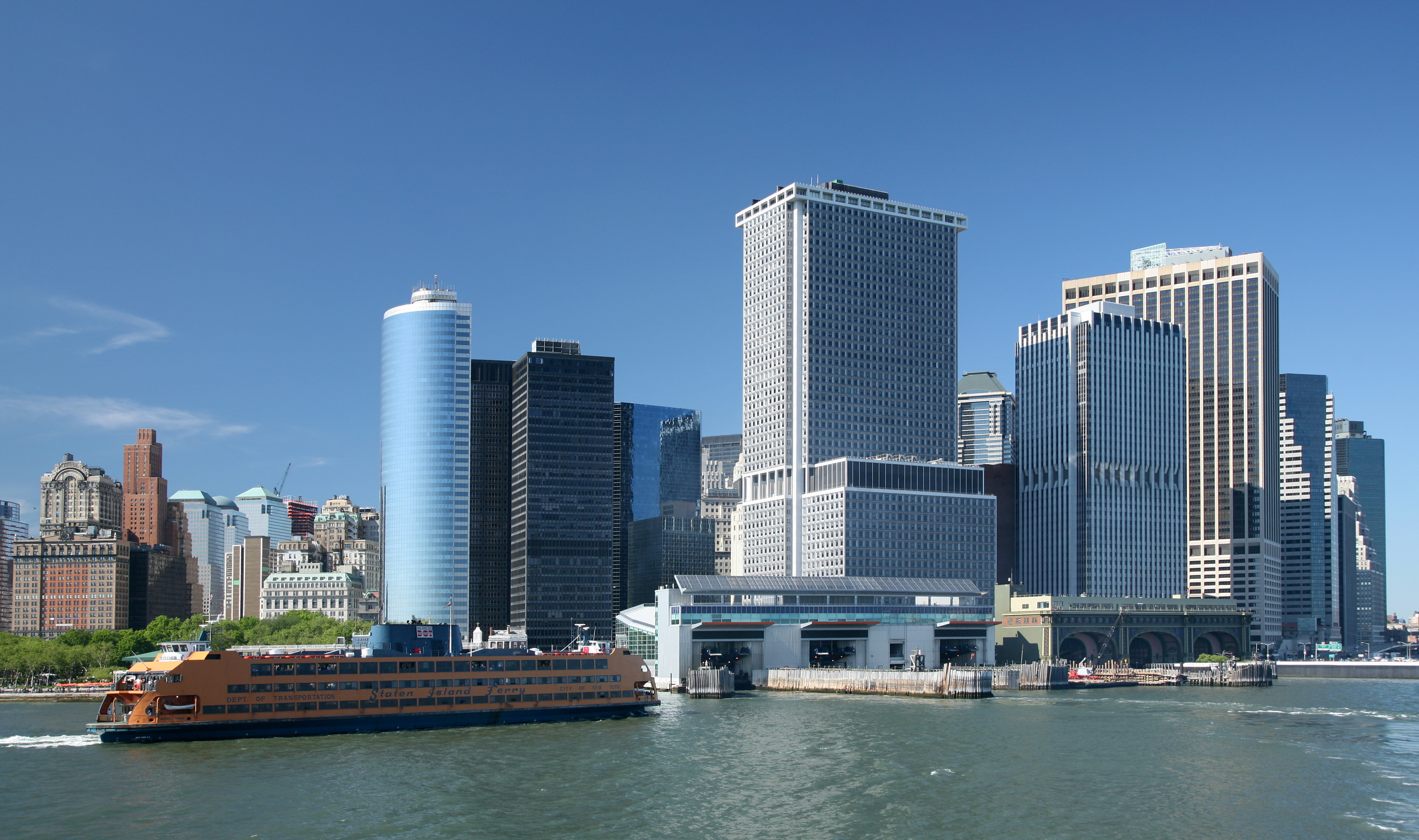
The Staten Island Ferry Terminal, located in Lower Manhattan

There have been at least two terminals on the site of the current Whitehall Terminal. When the original terminal opened in 1903, its Beaux-Arts design was identical to the Battery Maritime Building, which still exists. In 1919, a fire at the South Ferry elevated station damaged the building. A $3 million renovation of the terminal was announced in 1953, and it opened on July 24, 1956. The old terminal burned down in a fire on September 8, 1991. A new design was announced the next year, and a temporary terminal was opened at the site to accommodate passengers in the meantime.

On February 7, 2005, a completely renovated and modernized terminal, designed by architect Frederic Schwartz, was dedicated, along with the new two-acre Peter Minuit Plaza in the Battery. The terminal contains connections to the New York City Subway's South Ferry/Whitehall Street station complex, as well as to buses and taxis.

==== St. George Terminal ====
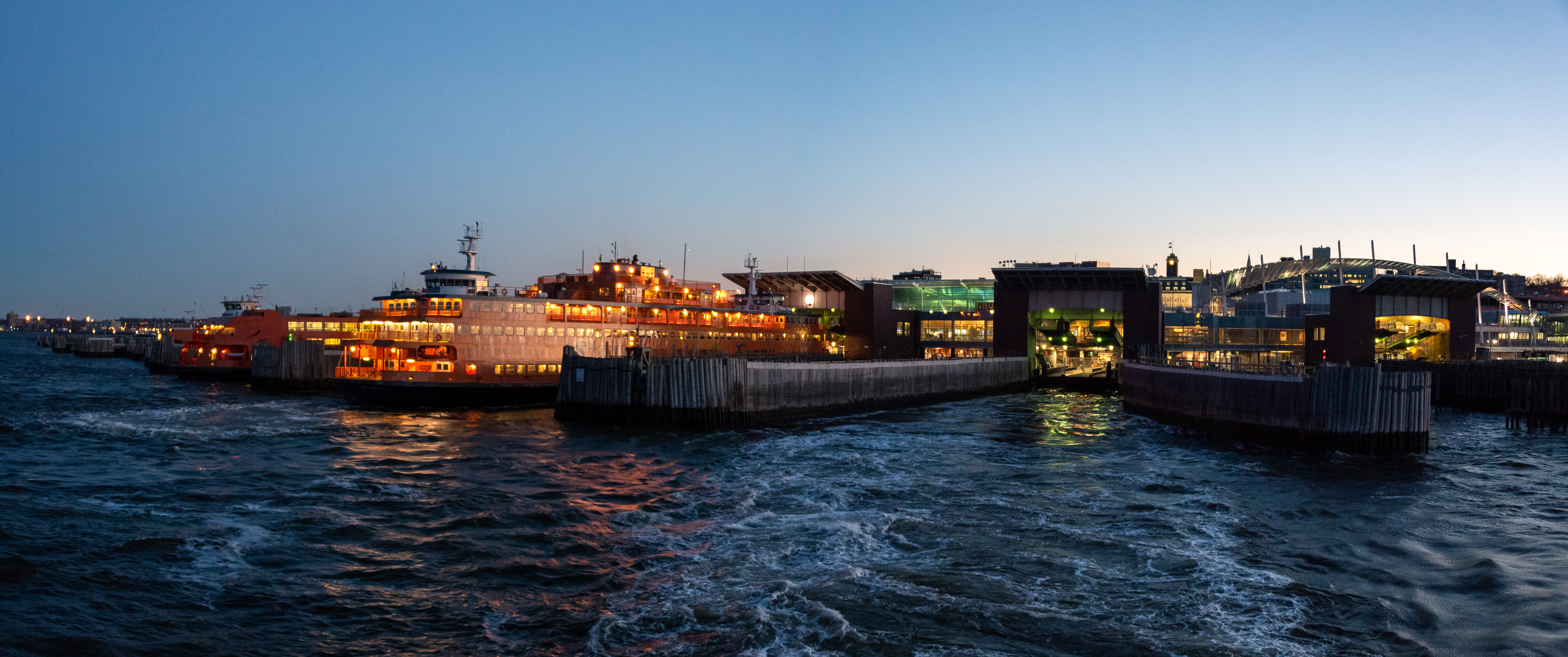
Departing St. George Terminal at sunset

A new ferry and rail terminal at St. George's Landing and an extension of the Staten Island Railway north from Vanderbilt's Landing had been proposed in the 1870s by the owners of the railroad (George Law, Cornelius Vanderbilt, and Erastus Wiman) to replace the various ferry sites on the north and east shores of Staten Island. St. George was selected due to its being the point where Staten Island is closest to Manhattan, approximately 5 miles (8.0 km) away. The terminal and local neighborhood were renamed "St. George" in honor of Law, allegedly as a concession by Wiman in order to build the terminal and connecting tunnel on land owned by Law. The ferry terminal was opened in early 1886.

On June 25, 1946, a large fire destroyed both the wooden ferry and rail terminals, killing three people, and injuring more than 200. Full service was restored in July of that year. A new $21-million facility was built by the city, and opened on June 8, 1951. Plans for a renovation of the terminal were announced in March 1997, and the terminal was renovated in the 2000s, as part of a $300 million renovation of several ferry terminals in the area, including the Whitehall Terminal. As of 2013, St. George's direct rail-sea connection is one of a few left in the United States.

=== Fares ===
There is no charge to take the ferry. However, riders who want to make a round trip must disembark at each terminal and reenter through the terminal building to comply with Coast Guard regulations regarding vessel capacity. The turnstiles were dismantled when fares were discontinued in 1997; the passenger counts can be approximated if the crew of each boat estimates the number of passengers aboard the vessel. The state's per-passenger subsidy in 2012 was $4.86, paid for through taxes. This subsidy rose to $5.87 in 2016, before dropping to $5.16 in 2017. By comparison, the city's per-passenger subsidy for NYC Ferry, in 2017, was $6.50, after accounting for the $2.75 per-passenger fare.

For most of the 19th and 20th centuries, the ferry was famed as the biggest bargain in New York City, as it charged the same one-nickel, or five-cent, fare as the New York City Subway. In 1882, riders protested against a proposed fare increase to 10 cents per ride, but were unsuccessful in obtaining a fare reduction. The fare-reduction movement resurfaced in 1894, with multiple petitions being submitted to the New-York Sinking Fund Commissioners. However, these petitions were all denied. By 1898, the fare had been reduced back to a nickel.

The fare for the ferry remained a nickel when the subway fare was increased to 10 cents in 1948. Despite the ferry's growing operational shortfalls in the 1950s, the five-cent fare remained, regardless of inflation. By 1968, the Citizens Budget Commission was proposing to hike fares to close the subsidy deficit, with Staten Island commuters to pay 20 cents, and others 50 cents, for a one-way trip. In May 1970, then-Mayor John V. Lindsay proposed that the fare be raised to 25 cents, pointing out that the cost for each ride was 50 cents, or ten times what the fare was bringing in. As part of a city budget passed in June of that year, the nickel fare was kept. Due to the city's financial crisis in the mid-1970s, Mayor Abraham Beame submitted a proposal to increase the fare in July 1975. On August 4, 1975, the fare was increased to 25 cents for a round trip, collected in one direction only. The fare increase was intended to earn the ferry service an extra $1.35 million in annual revenue.

In 1990, the charge for a round trip was increased to 50 cents, provoking a backlash among Staten Islanders, and sparking calls for its complete abolition. In 1993, grievances over the fare partly contributed to Staten Island's passing a non-binding referendum to secede from New York City. Rudy Giuliani's three-percent margin of victory in the concurrent mayoral elections was in considerable part due to the support of 80% of Staten Island voters, whose concerns he had pledged to address. The passenger fare was subsequently eliminated altogether, in July 1997, as part of the implementation of the MTA's "one-city, one-fare" system, which allowed for more free transfers between different modes of transit in New York City. The $3 car fares were not affected, as they were separate. The new MetroCard was configured to allow one free transfer between buses and subways; if the rider had paid a fare less than two hours prior, a ferry trip would be regarded as part of that transfer. Eliminating the ferry fare was seen as an action to standardize Staten Islanders' MetroCard fares with those of commuters in other boroughs. Despite the fact that the ferry fare had netted $6 million in annual revenue for the city, its abolition only cost the city about $1 million. The other $5 million represented the money saved not having to maintain the now-removed turnstiles, as well as the revenue from MetroCard fares. Some riders disliked the fares' discontinuance, as they felt that free service might mean lower-quality service.

In 2014, the city's Independent Budget Office conducted a study investigating the viability of collecting fares from everyone except Staten Island residents. The study found that, after accounting for the expenses of implementing the fare system, a $4 fare would generate net revenue of $35.5 million over fifteen years, while a $2 fare would generate net revenue of only $804,000 during the same time. About 4 million passengers would be subject to the fare annually, based on the previous year's ridership figure of 21.9 million.

=== Ridership ===
Ridership Fiscal Years 2007–2023
Fiscal Year	Ridership (millions)	Ref.
2007	18.953	
2008	19.757	
2009	20.118	
2010	21.464	
2011	21.404	
2012	22.178	
2013	21.399	
2014	21.256	
2015	21.9	
2016	23.1	
2017	23.9	
2018	24.5	
2019	25.2	
2020	15.9	
2021	7.6	
2022	12.1	
2023	14.7	

Detailed ridership figures for many fiscal years are not widely available because, in many cases, they not have been publicly released. A 1958 New York Times article cited a figure of 24 million annual riders. Ridership on the ferry peaked in 1964, with 27.5 million passengers, but the figure dropped to 22 million in 1965, after the Verrazzano–Narrows Bridge opened. In the early 2000s, ridership mostly fluctuated between 18 and 19 million, rising to 21.8 million in 2006 before dropping to 18.5 million the next year. Afterward, ridership started rising again, reaching over 21 million in fiscal year 2011.

In fiscal 2012, the ferry carried 22.18 million passengers, the highest figure in several decades. The figure in fiscal 2013 declined slightly to 21.4 million. Ridership for fiscal 2014 declined again to 21.25 million, while ridership on private ferry services increased. Public ridership then began rising in subsequent years, especially after the 2015 increase in trip frequency, when ridership reached 21.9 million. In fiscal 2016, ridership on the ferry increased to 23.1 million passengers; and in fiscal 2017, ridership increased further, to 23.9 million passengers, breaking the previous year's record. Ridership in fiscal year 2018 rose again to 24.5 million passengers, and in fiscal year 2019, increased to 25.2 million passengers. Ridership dropped significantly in 2020 and 2021 due to the COVID-19 pandemic. By fiscal 2023, ridership had partially recovered to 14.7 million, though the route still had substantially fewer passengers than before the pandemic. In calendar year 2025, the ferry had 16,692,900 riders.

As of 2024, the Staten Island Ferry is the single busiest ferry route, and one of the busiest ferry systems, in the United States, as well as the world's busiest passenger-only ferry. Despite having only a single route, it carried 23.1 million passengers in fiscal 2016 and ranked second in the United States. The largest operator in the nation, Washington State Ferries, is a multi-route system that carried 24.1 million passengers in 2016.

View source data.

== Fleet ==
=== Current ===
There are nine ferry boats in service, from four classes—Barberi (1), Austen (2), Molinari (3), and Ollis (3). As of 2025, all nine ferry boats run on renewable diesel.

==== Barberi class ====
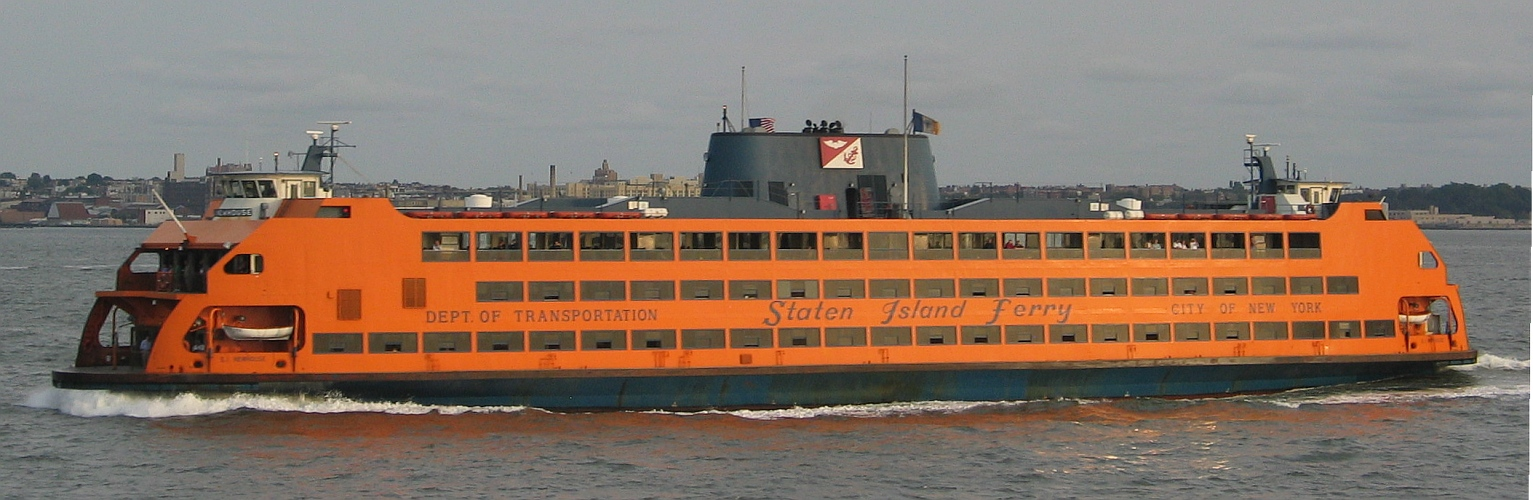
Samuel I. Newhouse, one of two Barberi-class ferryboats in the fleet, crosses Upper New York Bay

The Barberi class consists of MV Andrew J. Barberi and MV Samuel I. Newhouse, which were built in 1981 and 1982, respectively. Each boat has a crew of 15 and can carry 6,000 passengers but no cars. Each Barberi-class vessel is 310 feet (94 m) long and 69 feet 10 inches (21.29 m) wide, with a draft of 13 feet 6 inches (4.11 m), a weight of 3,335 gross tons, a service speed of 16 knots (30 km/h), and engines capable of 8,000 horsepower (6.0 MW). These ships were built at the Equitable Shipyard in New Orleans, at a cost of $16.5 million each. At the time of construction, the ships' capacity was the largest of any licensed ferry in the world.

Andrew J. Barberi was named after the man who coached Curtis High School's football team from the 1950s through the 1970s, while Samuel I. Newhouse was named after Samuel Irving Newhouse Sr., the Staten Island Advance's publisher from 1922 to 1979.

The MV Andrew J. Barberi ferry was retired in 2023.

==== Austen class ====
The Austen class consists of MV Alice Austen and MV John A. Noble, which were built in 1986 and are commonly referred to as "the Little Boats" or "Mini Barberis". Each boat has a crew of nine, carries 1,280 passengers but not cars, is 207 feet (63 m) long and 40 feet (12 m) wide, with a draft of 8 feet 6 inches (2.59 m), of 499 gross tons, with a service speed of 16 knots (30 km/h), and engines capable of 3,200 horsepower (2.4 MW). Their namesakes are Alice Austen (1866–1952), a Staten Island photographer, and John A. Noble (1913–83), a Staten Island marine artist.

Austen-class vessels usually operate late at night and into the early morning, when ridership is lower. Plans call for either the Alice Austen or the John A. Noble to be converted from using low-sulfur diesel as fuel to liquefied natural gas (LNG), in an effort to halve fuel consumption and reduce greenhouse gas emissions by 25 percent.

==== Molinari class ====
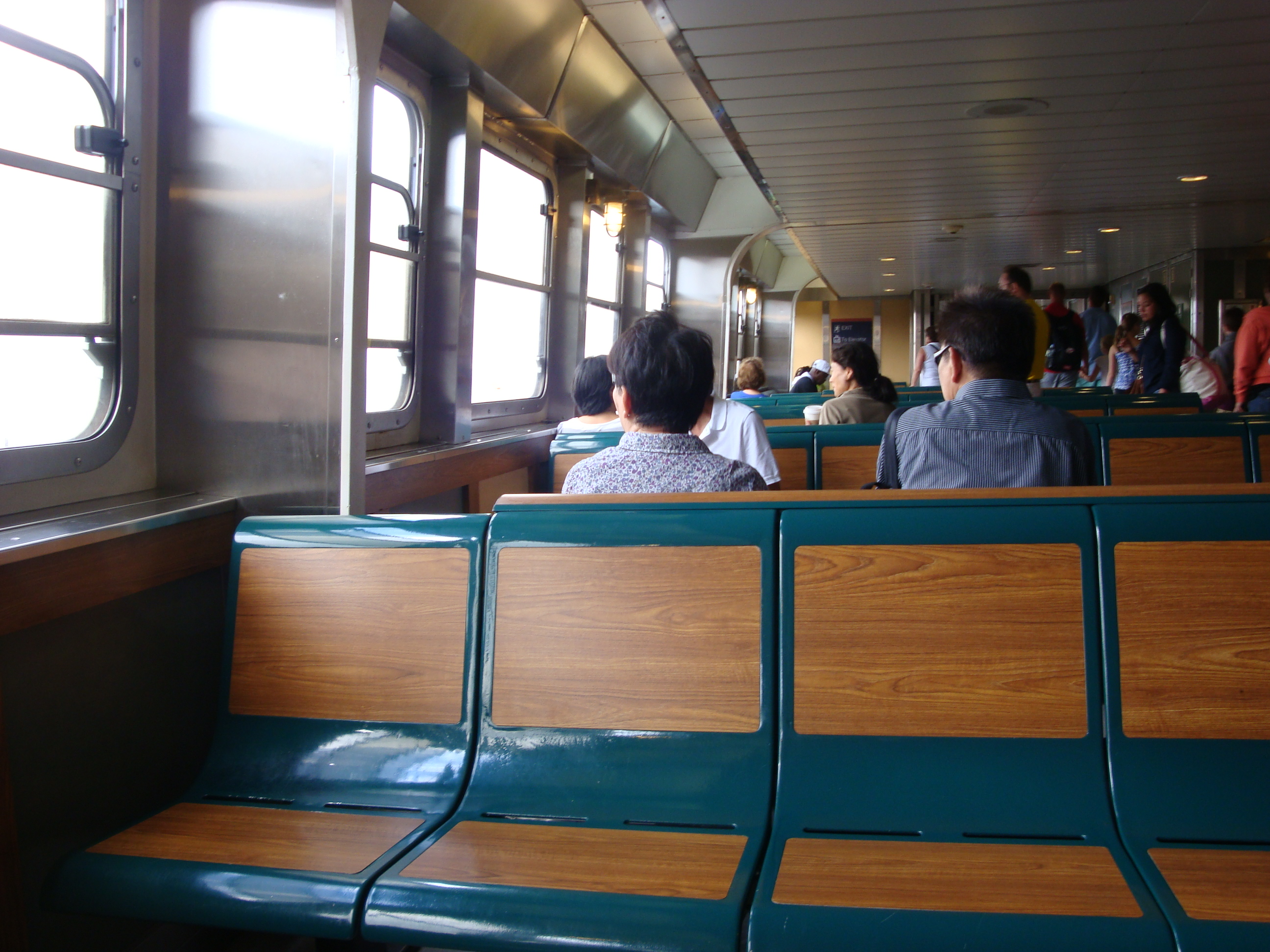
The passenger space of a Molinari-class ferryboat of the Staten Island Ferry

The Molinari class consists of MV Guy V. Molinari, MV Sen. John J. Marchi, and MV Spirit of America. Each boat has a crew of 16, carries a maximum of 4,427 passengers and up to 30 vehicles, is 310 feet (94 m) long by 70 feet (21 m) wide, with a draft of 13 feet 10 inches (4.22 m), of 2,794 gross tons, with a service speed of 16 knots (30 km/h), and engines capable of 9,000 horsepower (6.7 MW). Built by the Marinette Marine Group in Marinette, Wisconsin, they are designed to have a look and ambiance reminiscent of the classic New York ferryboats.

The lead boat is named after Guy V. Molinari, a former US Representative for several Staten Island districts, who later became a borough president of Staten Island. It was delivered in September 2004. The second ferry was named for State Senator John Marchi, who represented Staten Island for fifty years and delivered January 5, 2005. The third ferry, Spirit of America, was delivered September 16, 2005 and scheduled to be put into service on October 25, to celebrate the 100th anniversary of the municipal takeover of the Staten Island Ferry from the B&O railroad. Mechanical problems on the Molinari-class ferries and legal proceedings kept Spirit of America sidelined at the Staten Island Ferry's St. George maintenance facility until its maiden voyage on April 4, 2006. Since delivery, the ferries have been beset by frequent breakdowns, with 58 such incidents from 2008 to 2014; almost half of these breakdowns have been on Guy V. Molinari.

==== Ollis class ====
The John F. Kennedy, Samuel I. Newhouse, and Andrew J. Barberi are being replaced by three new 310 feet (94 m) vessels: SSG Michael H. Ollis, Sandy Ground, and Dorothy Day. They are named the Ollis class, after US Army Staff Sgt. Michael Ollis of Staten Island, who was killed in action during the War in Afghanistan. Elliott Bay Design devised the plans for the new ferries. In November 2016, Eastern Shipbuilding was confirmed as the low bidder for constructing the ships, and the shipyard was awarded the contract, with a notice to proceed being received on March 1, 2017. Delivery of the new ships was originally planned for 2019 and 2020. Deliveries were delayed after Eastern Shipbuilding's shipyard in Panama City, Florida, was severely damaged by Hurricane Michael in October 2018, and again in 2020 due to the COVID-19 pandemic in the United States. The first of the fleet, MV SSG Michael H. Ollis, entered service on February 14, 2022. This was followed by MV Sandy Ground, which entered service on June 17, 2022. The final ferry, MV Dorothy Day, entered service on April 28, 2023.

=== Former ===
==== Fleet acquired 1905–1931 ====
Several ferry classes, purchased since the city assumed ownership of the ferry, have been retired. The ferries named after the five boroughs, Bronx, Brooklyn, Manhattan, Queens, and Richmond, were the first ones commissioned for the city line in 1905. All of the boats except Richmond were 246 feet (75 m) long and 46 feet (14 m) wide, with a draft of 18 feet (5.5 m) and a gross tonnage of 1,954. Richmond had the same width and draft as its classmates, but was 232 feet (71 m) long with a gross tonnage of 2,006. All of the borough-class boats were retired in the 1940s. Manhattan was out of documentation by 1941, when Bronx was the first of the remaining boats to be scrapped. The three remaining ferries were scrapped by 1947, Brooklyn having served as a floating school for the United States Coast Guard in Williamsburg, Brooklyn, beginning in 1943, and Richmond having been converted to a barge in 1944.

The city's next class, delivered two years after the borough-class boats, consisted of Gowanus, Bay Ridge, and Nassau, which were used for the Brooklyn line. Each boat was 182 feet (55 m) long and 45 feet (14 m) wide, with a draft of 16 feet (4.9 m) and a gross tonnage of 862. These boats were all sold by 1940. Bay Ridge was used as the barge Rappahannock River, while the other two were scrapped.

The third class consisted of Mayor Gaynor (1914), followed by President Roosevelt (1922) and the first American Legion (1926). Each boat of this class differed in dimensions and gross tonnage from its classmates. Mayor Gaynor had a different engine and vastly different dimensions than its other two classmates, so it is sometimes considered as in a different class. Mayor Gaynor's 4-cylinder triple-expansion engine was not as efficient as the 2-cylinder compression engines of the previous borough-class boats, so the two vessels following it reverted to the more reliable engine type used in the borough-class. Additionally, Mayor Gaynor was 210 feet (64 m) long and 45 feet (14 m) wide, with a draft of 17 feet (5.2 m) and a gross tonnage of 1,634. The other two boats were approximately 251 feet (77 m) long by 46 feet (14 m) wide, and had a draft of 17 or 18 feet (5.2 or 5.5 m) and a gross tonnage of 2,029 (for President Roosevelt) or 2,089 (for American Legion). Mayor Gaynor was the first to be dismantled, in 1951, while President Roosevelt and American Legion were scrapped in 1956 and 1963, respectively.

In 1923, the steam turbine-powered ferryboats William Randolph Hearst, Rodman Wanamaker, and George W. Loft were built. The names of the boats, which were all derived from those of prominent New York City businessmen, were kept secret until the vessels were unveiled. All of these boats had a length of 205 feet (62 m), a width of 45 feet (14 m), a draft of 16 feet (4.9 m), and a gross tonnage of 875. George W. Loft shared her name with another boat used up the Hudson River, and so the other boat had to be renamed. Used mostly on the 39th Street route, these boats went into service in June 1924 and were out of documentation by 1954.

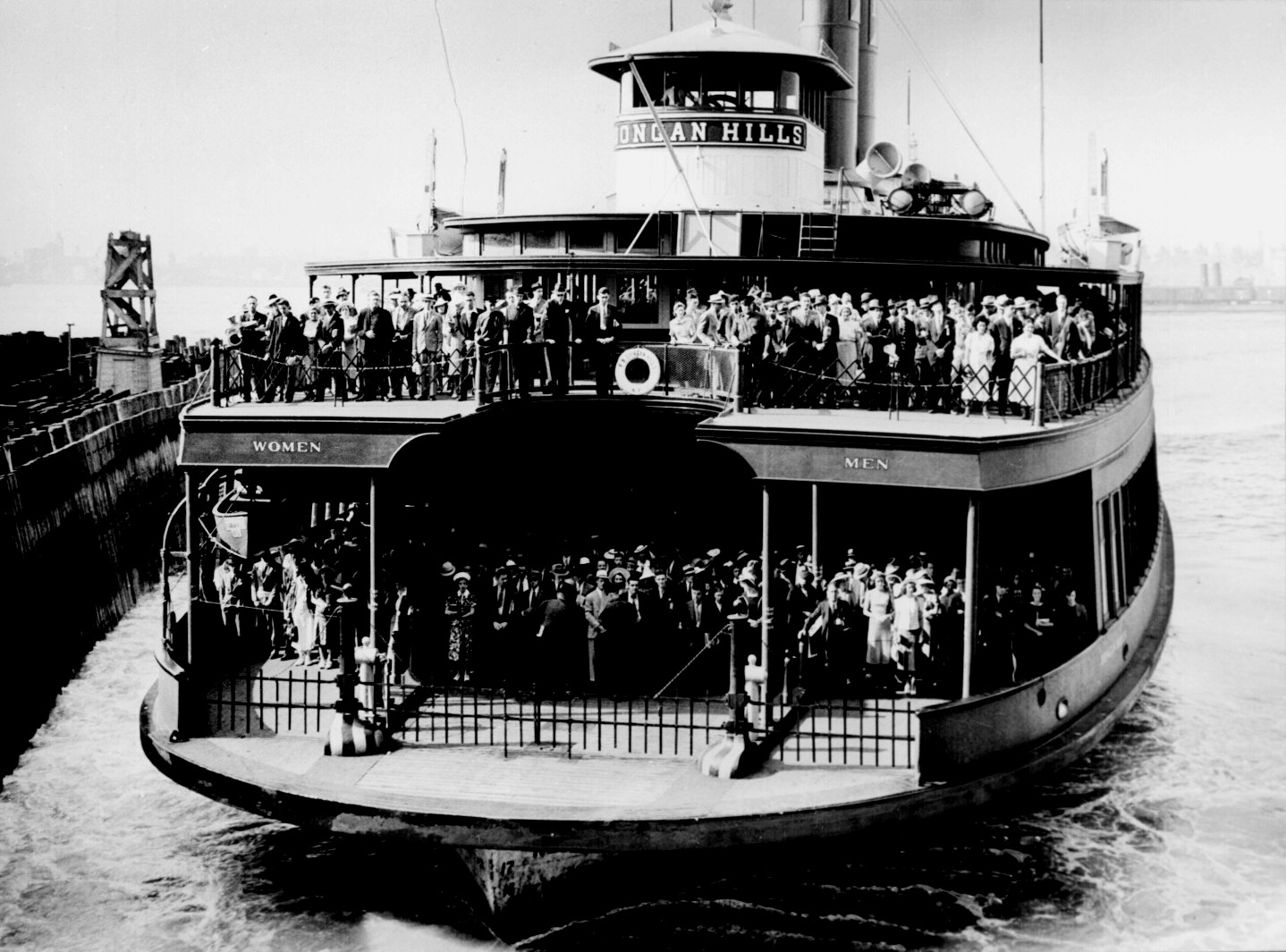
The ferryboat Dongan Hills, pictured in 1945

A subsequent class, delivered from 1929 through 1931, consisted of Dongan Hills, Tompkinsville, and Knickerbocker, in order of delivery. The first two boats had the same dimensions as President Roosevelt, while Knickerbocker was one foot longer and one foot wider, with a gross tonnage of 2,045. Tompkinsville and Dongan Hills went out of documentation in 1967–1968, while Knickerbocker was sold for scrap in 1965.

==== Fleet acquired after 1931 ====
The Miss New York class—consisting of Miss New York, Gold Star Mother, and Mary Murray—was delivered in 1938. They had the same width, length, and draft as Knickerbocker, with a gross tonnage of 2,126. Gold Star Mother was decommissioned in 1969, to save money, before being auctioned off in 1974. Gold Star Mother's sister Mary Murray was retired in 1974 and sold at auction. From 1982 through the mid-2000s, it then sat as a floating wreck on the Raritan River, within view of the New Jersey Turnpike, and was partially broken up for scrap in 2008. The third sister ship, Miss New York, was decommissioned in 1975 and auctioned. Miss New York was used as a restaurant for a while, but then sank.

The sixth class of ferryboats—Cornelius G. Kolff, Pvt. Joseph F. Merrell, and Verrazzano—went into service in 1951. These boats were slightly larger than their predecessors, with a length of 269 feet (82 m), a width of 69 feet (21 m), a draft of 19 feet (5.8 m), and a gross tonnage of 2,285. They were built at the Bethlehem Staten Island shipyard on Staten Island. Verrazzano was decommissioned and sold at auction in the 1980s. The new owners proposed to use the old ferry at a Japanese amusement park. That deal fell through, and it became a floating wreck at the Red Hook Container Terminal. Its two classmates, Kolff (later Walter Keane) and Merrell (later Vernon C. Bain, then Harold A. Wildstein) were shipped to Rikers Island in 1987 to help alleviate prison overcrowding there, to be used as an interim housing solution while new jail facilities were being built. Keane and Wildstein, along with the retired British troop carriers Bibby Resolution and Bibby Venture, were used to house 1,000 inmates. The vessels were removed from prison use in 1997, after the Vernon C. Bain floating barge was built; and both vessels were scrapped in 2004.

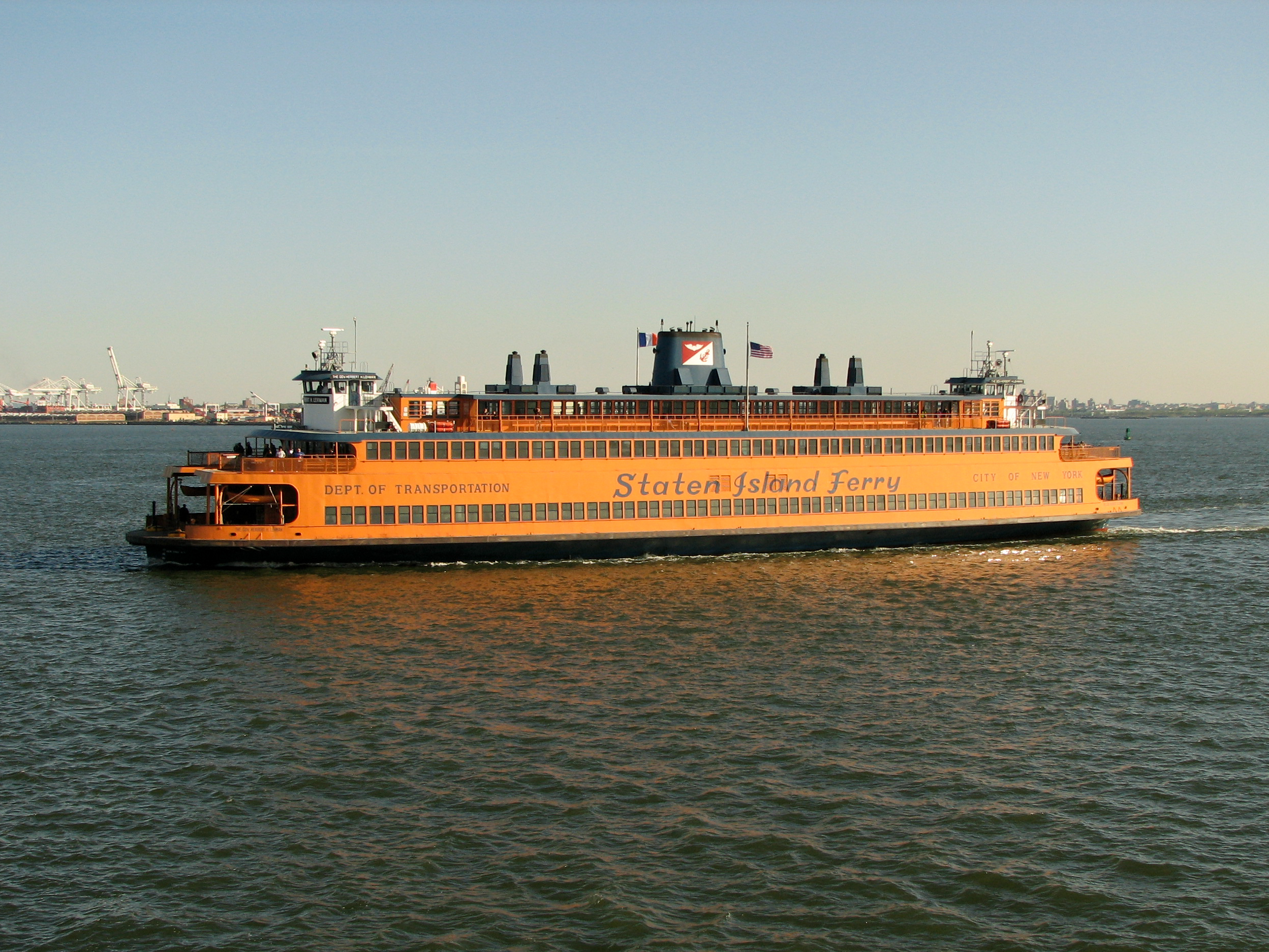
The Gov. Herbert H. Lehman, a now-retired Kennedy-class ferry, on its way to Staten Island

The Kennedy class consists of MV John F. Kennedy, the second MV American Legion, and MV The Gov. Herbert H. Lehman, which were delivered in 1965. Each boat had a crew of 15, could carry 3,055 passengers and 40 vehicles, is 297 feet (91 m) long and 69 feet 10 inches (21.29 m) wide, with a draft of 13 feet 6 inches (4.11 m), of 2,109 gross tons, with a service speed of 16 knots (30 km/h), and engines capable of 6,500 horsepower (4.8 MW). They were built by the Levingston Shipbuilding Company in Orange, Texas, and were delivered in May and June 1965. Most of the Kennedy class has also been scrapped. American Legion was retired in 2006 and sold for scrap. Its classmate The Gov. Herbert H. Lehman was retired in 2007 and sold at auction by the city in 2011. By 2012, it was being scrapped at Steelways Shipyard in Newburgh, New York, where it sank after developing a leak. John F. Kennedy was the last of its class in service; it retired in August 2021 and was sold to Pete Davidson and Colin Jost at a January 2022 auction.

== Incidents ==
=== Early 20th century, after city takeover ===
In November 1910, the ferryboat Nassau ran aground on the seawall of Governors Island, but most passengers were able to jump off the boat safely. The boat only suffered minor damage to its propeller.

On October 31, 1921, the ferryboat Mayor Gaynor ran aground near Robbins Reef Light, in the middle of the harbor. This was a result of a heavy fog, which slowed shipping and caused a BRT train accident that injured 20 people. On February 24, 1929, the same boat was involved in another crash, when it ran into the Whitehall ferry slip and injured three people. Coincidentally, Mayor Gaynor collided with the same spot a year and a day later, injuring seven people.

=== Late 20th century ===
On January 16, 1953, a heavy fog across the East Coast caused four ferry accidents in New York Harbor. In one accident, the Gold Star crashed into the United States Lines freighter American Veteran, injuring 13 people. In another heavy fog four days later, Joseph F. Merrill crashed into an Ellis Island ferryboat, jolting several passengers but injuring no one. Five years later, on February 8, 1958, Dongan Hills was hit by the Norwegian tanker Tynefield, injuring 15 people. The Cornelius G. Kolff collided with a ferry slip at the Whitehall Terminal on June 4, 1959, injuring 14 people.

On October 23, 1960, the "Sunday Bomber" struck, blowing up a supply closet as the ferry passed the Statue of Liberty. No injuries were reported.

On November 7, 1978, American Legion crashed into the concrete seawall near the Statue of Liberty ferry port during a dense fog, injuring 173 people on board.

On May 6, 1981, American Legion was involved in another crash. At 7:16 am EDT, it was en route from Staten Island to Manhattan with approximately 2,400 passengers aboard, when it was rammed in dense fog by MV Hoegh Orchid, a Norwegian freighter inbound from the sea to a berth in Brooklyn. The ferryboat was damaged from below the main deck up to the bridge deck. 71 passengers were treated for injuries, three of whom were hospitalized. The absence of a gyrocompass, which could have supplemented existing radar capabilities in avoiding collisions, was noted in the February 2, 1982, report by the National Transportation Safety Board.

On July 7, 1986, a mentally ill man, Juan Gonzalez, attacked passengers with a sword on Samuel I. Newhouse. He killed two and injured nine before being detained and sent to a hospital for psychiatric evaluation.

On April 12, 1995, Andrew J. Barberi, due to a mechanical malfunction, rammed her slip at St. George. The doors on the saloon deck were crushed by the slip's adjustable aprons, which a quick-thinking bridgeman lowered to help stop the oncoming ferryboat. Several people were injured. Two years later, on September 19, 1997, the terminal was also the site of an incident involving a vehicle. A car plunged off John F. Kennedy as she was docking, causing minor injuries to the driver and a deckhand who was knocked overboard.

=== 21st century ===
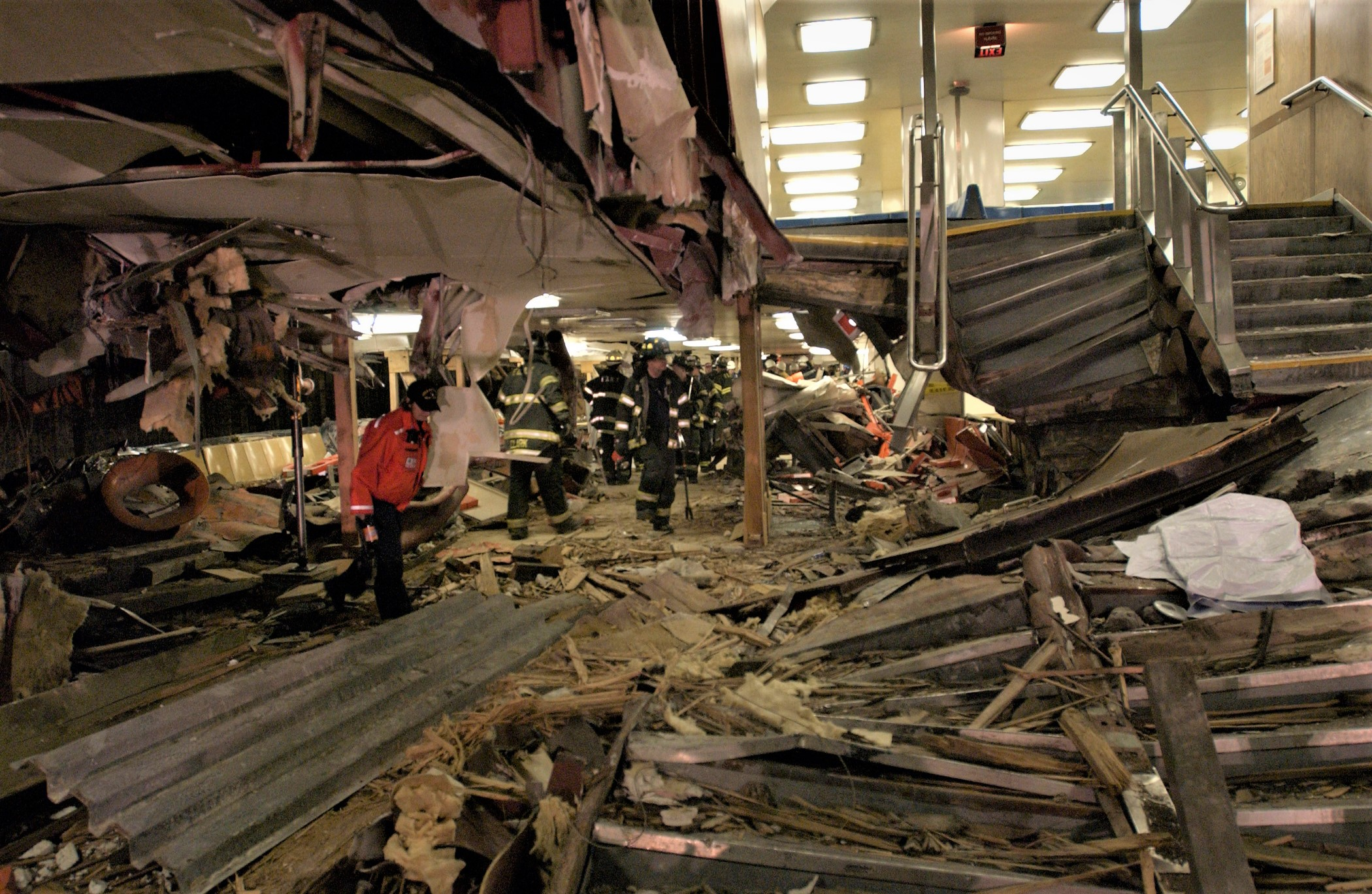
Damage to Andrew J. Barberi's interior after the 2003 Staten Island Ferry crash

The new century brought the city's deadliest mass-transit incident in 50 years. On October 15, 2003, at 3:21 pm EDT, Andrew J. Barberi collided with a pier on the eastern end of the St. George ferry terminal, killing 11 people, seriously injuring many others, and tearing a huge gash in the lowest of the three passenger decks. The incident spurred an investigation into safety practices aboard the ferry and an accident investigation by the National Transportation Safety Board. Andrew J. Barberi's captain at the time of the incident was fired. The ferryboat returned to service in 2004.

The St. George terminal also saw two more minor pier collisions. On July 1, 2009, at 7:09 pm EDT, Sen. John J. Marchi lost power and hit a pier at full speed, resulting in 15 minor injuries. The four-year-old boat had a history of electrical problems. On May 8, 2010, at 9:20 am EDT, Andrew J. Barberi approached the dock, the reverse thrust failed to respond, and the boat could not slow down. Thirty-seven of the 252 passengers on board were injured.

Several riders were injured on December 22, 2022, when a fire broke out on the Sandy Ground as it was traveling to St. George.

== See also ==
- Staten Island Ferry Disaster Memorial Museum, a memorial sculpture commemorating a fake giant-octopus attack on the Staten Island Ferry
- Other ferry systems in the New York City area:
  - NYC Ferry
  - SeaStreak
  - New York Water Taxi
  - NY Waterway

== Bibliography ==
- Adams, Arthur G. (1983). The Hudson through the years. Lind Publications. ISBN 978-0-8232-1677-2.
- Cudahy, Brian J. (1990). Over and Back: The History of Ferryboats in New York Harbor. Fordham University Press. ISBN 978-0-8232-1245-3.
- Morris, Ira (1900). Morris's Memorial History of Staten Island, New York. Vol. 2. Memorial Publishing Company.
- Roess, Roger P.; Sansome, Gene (2013). The Wheels That Drove New York: A History of the New York City Transit System. Springer. pp. 223–247. doi:10.1007/978-3-642-30484-2. ISBN 978-3-642-30484-2.
- Staten Island Museum (2014). Staten Island Ferry. Arcadia Publishing. ISBN 978-1-4396-4706-6.
- Stiles, T. J. (2009). The First Tycoon: The Epic Life of Cornelius Vanderbilt. Alfred A. Knopf. ISBN 978-0-375-41542-5.
