= List of jail facilities in New York City =

This is a list of jail facilities in New York City. It includes federal prisons, county jails, and city jails run by the New York City Department of Corrections.

== Current facilities ==
- Bellevue Hospital Prison Ward
- Elmhurst Hospital Prison Ward
- Kings County Hospital Prison Ward
- Metropolitan Detention Center, Brooklyn
- Rikers Island
  - Eric M. Taylor Center
  - George R. Vierno Center
  - North Infirmary Command
  - Otis Bantum Correctional Center
  - Robert N. Davoren Complex
  - Rose M. Singer Center
  - West Facility

== Defunct facilities ==
- Anna M. Kross Center
- Arthur Kill Correctional Facility
- Bayview Correctional Facility
- Benjamin Ward Visit Center
- Bridewell (New York City jail)
- Brooklyn Detention Complex
- George Motchan Detention Center
- Harold A. Wildstein
- James A. Thomas Center
- Ludlow Street Jail
- Manhattan Detention Complex
- Metropolitan Correctional Center, New York (may reopen)
- New York Women's House of Detention
- Queens Detention Complex
- Raymond Street Jail
- Spofford Juvenile Center
- Sugar house prisons (New York)
- Vernon C. Bain Correctional Center
- Walter B. Keane
