= Anna M. Kross Center =

Building in New York, United States

Coordinates: 40.79206°N 73.88649°W

The Anna M. Kross Center (AMKC), also known as the C-95, was a jail on Rikers Island used to hold male inmates for the New York City Department of Corrections.

== History ==
AMKC was completed in 1978, and was initially known as C-95. It is located on 18-18 Hazen Street, East Elmhurst, NY. AMKC is spread over 40 acres of land. It was named for former New York City Department of Correction Commissioner Anna M. Kross, AMKC was the largest jail on Riker's Island.

AMKC closed in July 2023. The kitchen for Rikers Island continues to operate out of AMKC.

== Uses ==
AMKC included a Methadone Detoxification Unit. AMKC held the Mental Health Center. AMKC held over 2300 inmates per month.

== See also ==
- List of jail facilities in New York City
