= Driscoll Point =

Point in Antarctica

Driscoll Point (82°59′S 168°0′E) is a point forming the east side of the entrance to Wise Bay, overlooking the Ross Ice Shelf. It was mapped by the United States Geological Survey from tellurometer surveys (1961–62) and Navy air photos (1960), and was named by the Advisory Committee on Antarctic Names after C. E. Driscoll, Master of the USNS Pvt. Joseph F. Merrell, during U.S. Navy Operation Deep Freeze 1963.
