= Vernon C. Bain Correctional Center =

Jail barge in the Bronx, New York

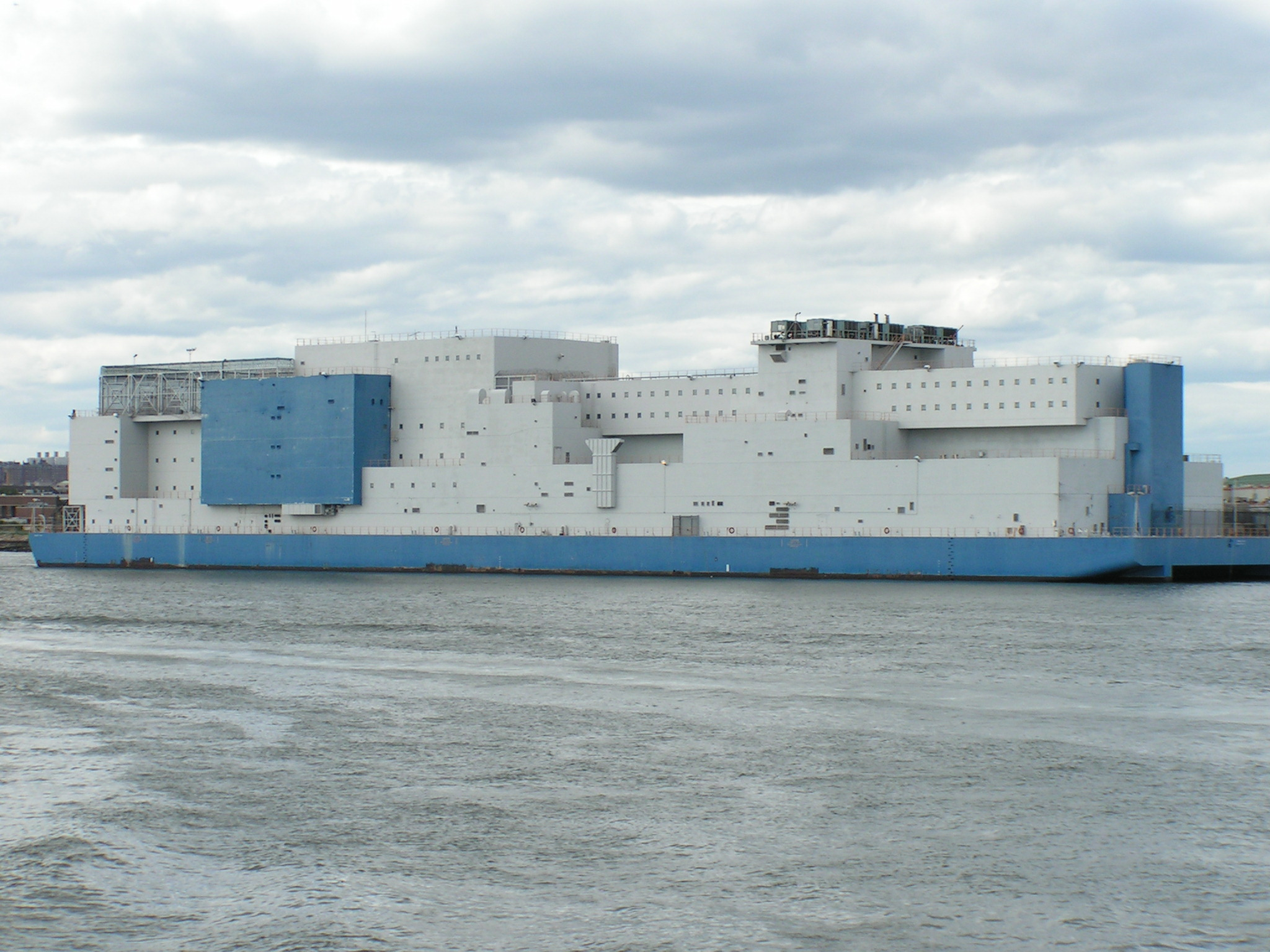
- The jail barge seen from the East River
- Interactive map of Vernon C. Bain Correctional Center
- Location: Hunts Point, Bronx, New York; 40°48′5″N 73°52′38″W
- Status: Closed
- Security class: intake and processing
- Capacity: 870
- Opened: 1992
- Closed: 2023
- Managed by: New York City Department of Corrections

The Vernon C. Bain Correctional Center (VCBC; also known as the Vernon C. Bain Maritime Facility and nicknamed "The Boat") was an 800-bed jail barge used to hold inmates for the New York City Department of Corrections. The barge was anchored off the Bronx's southern shore, across from Rikers Island, near Hunts Point. It was built for $161 million at Avondale Shipyard in Louisiana, along the Mississippi River near New Orleans, and brought to New York in 1992 to reduce overcrowding in the island's land-bound buildings for a lower price. It was designed to handle inmates from medium- to maximum-security in 16 dormitories and 100 cells.

The Vernon C. Bain Center was the third jail barge that the New York Department of Corrections has used. In its history, the jail has served traditional and juvenile inmates, and in later years was a holding and temporary processing center. The added security of the jail being on water has prevented at least four attempted escapes. The barge was named in memorial for warden Vernon C. Bain, who died in an automobile accident. In 2014, the jail barge was named the world's largest prison barge in operation by Guinness World Records. The barge was decommissioned in November 2023 and was brought to Louisiana in November 2025 for scrapping.

== History ==
=== Planning ===
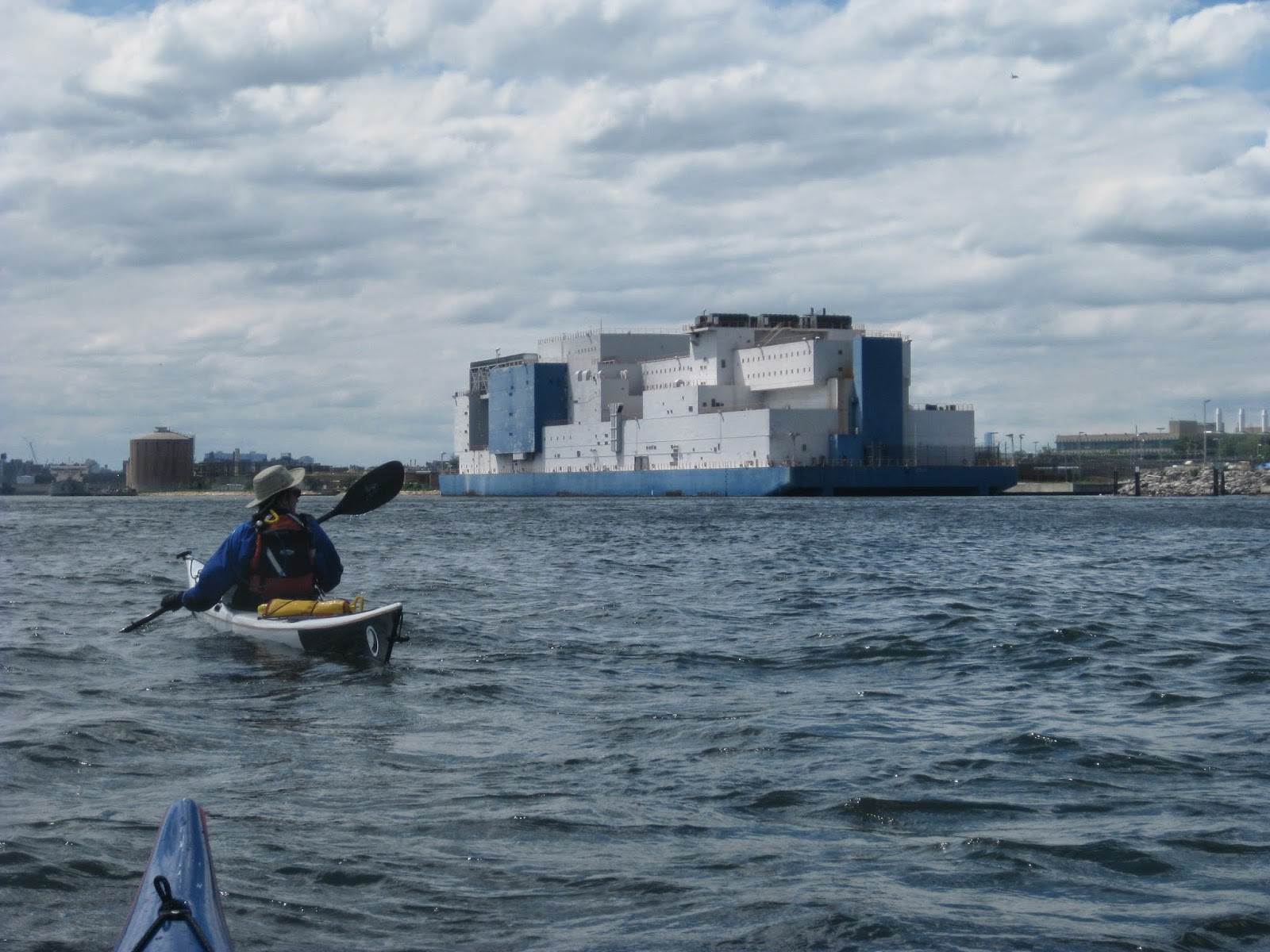
Vernon C. Bain barge as seen from kayaks on the East River.

In the late 1980s, the New York City Department of Correction experienced overcrowding issues in its jail complexes. The idea of temporarily alleviating the issues of a growing inmate population and dwindling space by outfitting jail ships was conceived under the administration of then Mayor Edward I. Koch. Their solution was to develop usable jail space with maritime cells and avoid complaints about building jails in densely populated neighborhoods. At the time, the jails at nearby Rikers Island held 22,000 inmates, and with this number increasing consistently, were nearing capacity.

In 1988, the Bibby Resolution and her sister ship Bibby Venture were bought by the New York City Department of Correction to serve as the first two jail ships. Both ships were previously used as British troop carriers before being re-purposed into jail ships. The Bibby Venture was docked off Manhattan's Greenwich Village, while the Bibby Resolution was located off the Lower East Side of Manhattan. They were decommissioned in 1992. In 1994 both ships were sold, leaving the Bain Correctional Center and two converted Staten Island ferries, the Harold A. Wildstein and Walter B. Keane, docked at Rikers Island to be used when overcrowding became an issue.

=== Construction ===
The construction of the Vernon C. Bain Center jail barge began in 1989 at Avondale Shipyard by Avondale Industries and was supposed to be finished in 1990 at the price of $125.7 million. Due to unanticipated construction problems including issues with the ventilation system, the finished barge was delivered 18 months late and $35 million over budget. The barge was originally slated to be docked at the Brooklyn Army Terminal or the mayor's mansion. The site ultimately chosen, at Hunts Point, was selected after protests arose over the other proposed sites. On January 26, 1992, the recently outfitted jail barge was brought through Long Island Sound by the tugboat, Michael Turecamo, after an 1,800 nautical mile trip. The new barge was named for well-liked and respected warden Vernon C. Bain, who had died in an automobile accident.

One of the first captains of the barge under the Department of Corrections had previously been employed by the same tugboat company and had earlier captained the tugboat that hauled the barge to its current location. The new crew of the jail barge, who were placed in accordance with Coast Guard regulations, worked on the empty barge to learn the vessel operations, including the electrical and fire fighting systems. The barge officially opened for use and began accepting inmates later in 1992.

=== Usage ===
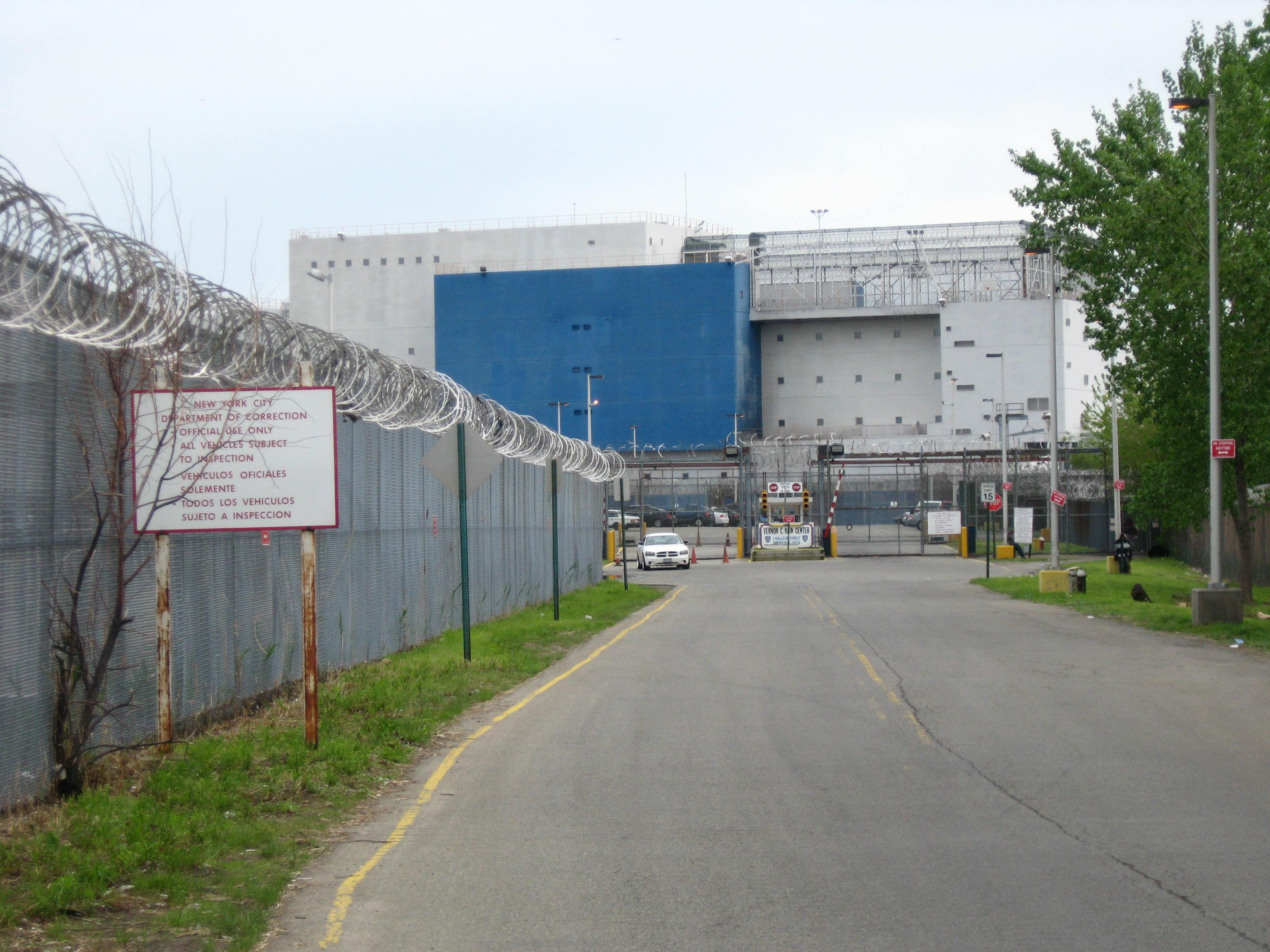
Parking lot and main entrance to the center in Hunts Point, Bronx

From the time the barge was constructed, there had been controversy about its cost. The final price was more than $35 million over budget, which attracted negative attention. The assistant correction commissioner, John H. Shanahan, claimed the price difference was because the Department of Corrections "never designed this kind of passenger vessel before and unfortunately there was a mistake in the original contract." William Booth, the chairman of the Board of Corrections, said at the time that the jail barge would be the last barge the Department of Corrections would build because the process was too expensive and too uncertain. The Board of Corrections is an independent body that monitors city-owned jails.

By the time the Bain Center opened, the inmate population of New York City's jail system had started to decline. The jail barge was temporarily closed in August 1995 due to less crowded city jails, caused by a decline in arrests and inmate transfers. In late 1996, the jail was slated for reopening due to the rise in arrests from a campaign targeting drugs and drug dealers. The six-month campaign expected more than seven thousand additional arrests than usual, but the ship was not reopened until 1998 when it was used by the Department of Juvenile Justice. The Bain Center was then used as a processing facility for inmates in the Department of Corrections system, supplementing three other processing facilities that each handle specific boroughs.

In early 2016, New York City government officials began looking into ways to possibly shutter Rikers Island and transfer prisoners to other locations. One plan was to situate a 2,000-bed jail in the parking lot for the Bain Center. Another similar plan included closing the barge jail. In 2018 the city released plans to phase out Rikers Island over ten years and replace it with borough-based jails. The Bain Center was included in the plan to close Rikers Island, which the New York City Council voted to approve in October 2019. Under the bill, both facilities would have to close by 2026. The jail barge was the subject of several high-profile incidents in its final years. For example, one inmate died in 2021 after he contracted meningitis and was left untreated, while another inmate killed himself in 2022 after jumping off the barge. Opponents of the barge's continued operation said the facility's inmates, who were largely Hispanic and black, were incarcerated "with minimal oversight".

=== Closure ===
In September 2023, the city's Department of Corrections announced plans to decommission the Vernon C. Bain Center by that October. The DOC would move the barge's 200 staff and 500 prisoners to Rikers Island. The last prisoners were moved off the barge that November. The Associated Press wrote at the time that the barge was a "grim vestige of mass incarceration, an enduring symbol of the city's failures to reform dangerous jails" in the city.

In June 2025, city officials announced plans to construct the Hunts Point Marine Terminal at the Bain Correctional Center site. Louisiana Scrap Metal bought the barge that October for $1.5 million, and the barge was towed away for scrapping on November 3 that year.

== Facilities ==
The 625-foot-long (191 m) by 125-foot-wide (38 m) flatbed barge had 16 dormitories and 100 cells for inmates. For recreation, there was a full-size gym with basketball court, weight lifting rooms, and an outdoor recreation facility on the roof. There were three worship chapels, a modern medical facility, and a library open to inmate use. The 47,326-ton facility was on the water, and when it opened, 3 or more maritime crews were maintained under Coast Guard regulations. According to John Klumpp, the barge's first captain, in 2002 "the Coast Guard, after years of monitoring the jail barge, finally accepted the reality that that it was, de facto, a jail and not a boat." These facilities were featured in the 1993 movie Carlito's Way.

The jail barge was located in Hunts Point in the South Bronx, about 5 miles (8.0 km) from SUNY Maritime College at Throggs Neck. The Hunts Point Cooperative Market is located nearby. At the time of the barge's opening, the area was difficult to access via public transportation.

== Operations ==
As of 2019, the barge employed 317 workers and had an annual operating cost of $24 million. The barge's rate of "use-of-force by corrections officers" was the third-lowest among the city's corrections facilities. By the 2020s, detainees were grouped into extremely small, poorly lit dormitories that were rusting, and the barge sometimes leaked during rainstorms. According to the Associated Press, detainees received one hour of recreational time per day.

=== Juvenile detention ===
A surge in the need for juvenile detention space caused the New York City Department of Juvenile Justice to lease space at the Bain Correction Center in 1998. At the time, there were over five thousand juveniles aged thirteen to eighteen years old in secure detention in New York. The barge had been unused since August 1995 but had been maintained and was ready to house inmates again. The center was used to solve the space problem and to assist in the closure of Spofford Juvenile Center. The temporary space was used for juvenile inmate processing and temporary housing for inmates prior to transfer. The underage inmates were moved out of the Bain Center and back into the Spofford facility in 1999. In January 2000, the Department of Juvenile Justice, after completing renovations to other buildings, moved out of the center.

== Escapes ==
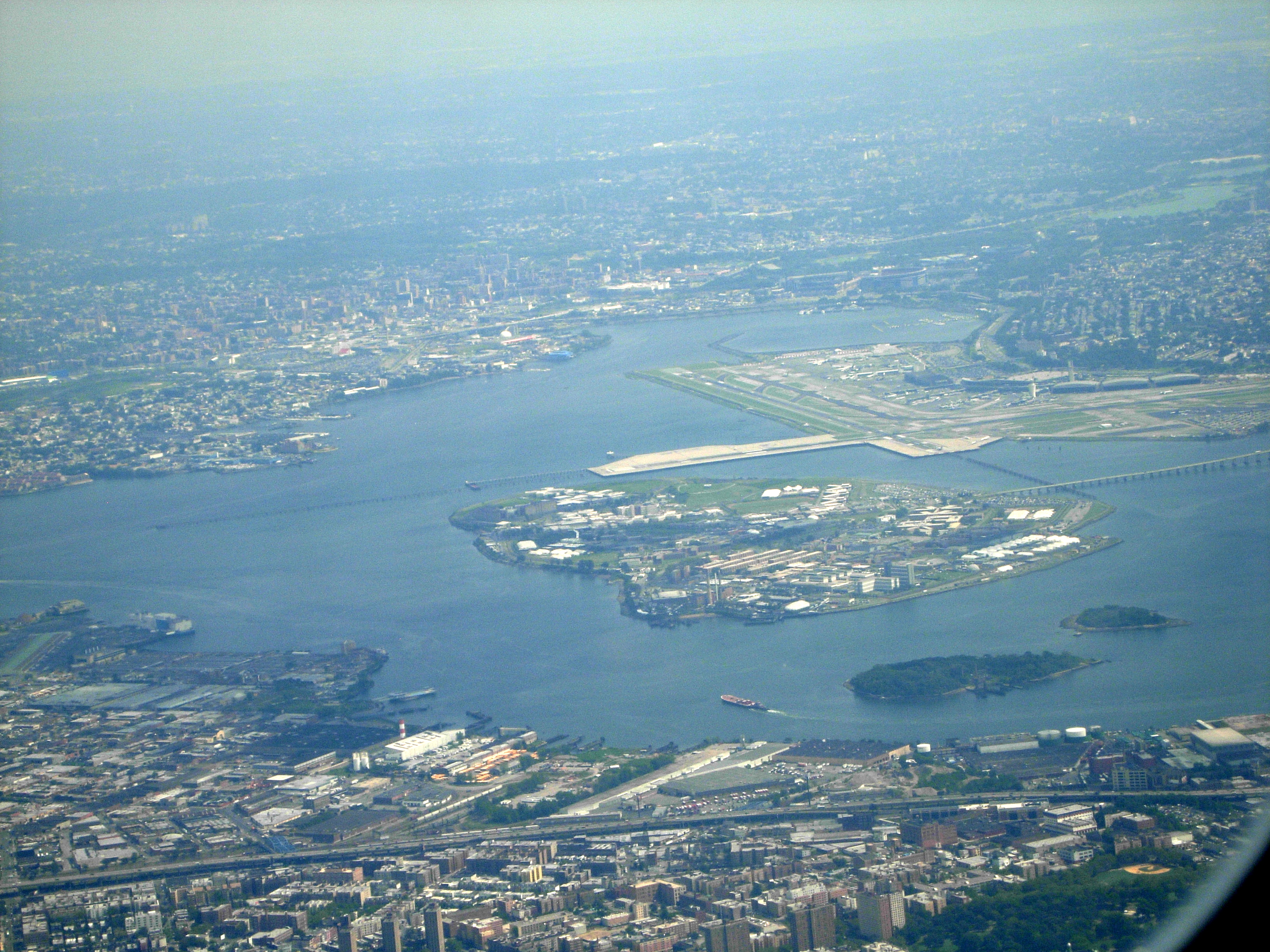
Aerial photo of Rikers Island, seen from the North. Bain Correctional Center is seen in the bottom left corner as the docked blue and white ship.

The first time a prisoner tried to escape from the Bain was in 1993, when a 38-year-old prisoner was able to escape while he was supposed to be cleaning ice from the parking lot in front of the boat. The guard who was responsible for the inmate was suspended without pay due to the incident.

Prior to 2002, an inmate tried to escape from the jail's recreation area by climbing the 30-foot fence equipped with razor wire. The guards' uniform boots prevented them from climbing the fence in pursuit, so they threw basketballs at the inmate to stop his escape, but he was able to successfully climb over it. He dove into the East River, where he was promptly picked up and returned by a police watercraft that was dispatched to the scene.

Another escape occurred in February 2004 when the girlfriend of an inmate gave him a handcuff key. The inmate was handcuffed by one wrist to another inmate, but he was able to remove the cuffs and free himself without any jail employee noticing. The inmate was able to cling to the undercarriage of a prisoner transport bus to ride away from the facility. He let go of the bus in the South Bronx and walked away, but was apprehended nearly a month later. Six officers and a captain were given administrative leave due to the incident. The corrections commissioner said the escape was caused by a combination of the inmate's quick thinking and the officers' sloppy work.

In early 2013, an inmate charged with petty larceny successfully slipped out of his handcuffs as he arrived at the Bain Center. In 2021 a prisoner used a rope to escape from his cell via a window. He was caught the following day.

== Sources ==
- Klumpp, John S. (2011). An Ordinary Guy, an Extraordinary Tale: My Life and Times. Bloomington, Indiana: IUniverse Books. ISBN 978-1-4620-5354-4.
- Wacquant, Loïc (2009). Punishing the Poor: The Neoliberal Government of Social Insecurity. Durham, North Carolina: Duke University Press. ISBN 978-0-8223-9225-5.
