= Walter B. Keane =

Retired jail barge and ferry vessel

The Walter B. Keane (WB), and under the nickname "The Barge", was an 168-bed jail barge used to hold inmates for the New York City Department of Corrections. The barge is currently anchored off Staten Island but was previously docked on Rikers Island, near Hunts Point.

== History ==
Originally called the Cornelius G. Kolff being the last two steam ship ferries along with the Private Joseph F. Merrell for the Staten Island ferry. It was originally an annex of OBCC The Walter Keene was a former Staten Island Ferry that was docked at Rikers Island. The Walter Keane worked for the Staten Island ferry for 36 years prior to being docked on Rikers Island. It was originally an annex of OBCC, and was named after Walter Keane, a correctional officer who died on a job related accident. While the Merrell was renamed VCBC and later Harold A. Wildstein. It was able to hold 162 inmates. As the population on Rikers Island decreased, the use of the Walter Keene declined. In 2002, it was shuttered for inmate use, and was put up for sale. In 2004, it was sold for scrap metal and docked in Staten Island.

== See also ==
List of jail facilities in New York City
