= Anna M. Kross =

Russian-American lawyer, judge, and public official

Anna Moscowitz Kross

New York City Commissioner of Correction
- In office 1953–1966
- Appointed by: Robert F. Wagner Jr.
- Preceded by: Albert Williams
- Succeeded by: George Hochman

Personal details
- Born: Anna Moscowitz; July 17, 1891 Nyasvizh, Russia
- Died: August 27, 1979 (aged 88) The Bronx, New York, U.S.
- Other political affiliations: Democratic
- Spouse: Isidor Kross (m. 1917)
- Children: 2 (Helen K. Golden, Alice K. Frankel)
- Education: Columbia University; New York University (LL.B, LL.M)
- Occupation: Lawyer, judge, public official
- Known for: New York City Commissioner of Correction (1953–1966)
- Awards: Eleanor Roosevelt Memorial Award (1964)

Anna Moscowitz Kross (July 17, 1891 – August 27, 1979) was a Russian-American lawyer, judge, and public official. She was New York City Commissioner of Correction from 1953 to 1966.

== Early life and education ==
Anna Moscowitz was born on July 17, 1891, in Nyasvizh, Russia. She immigrated to the United States with her parents, Maier and Esther (Drazen) Moscowitz, when she was two years old, to avoid religious persecution.

The family were poor, and Moscowitz worked in a factory and taught English. Anna studied at Columbia University in 1907, and at night studied law on a scholarship. She received an L.L.B in 1910 and an L.L.M. from New York University in 1911 and was admitted to the New York Bar in 1912. While still in law school she became interested in the fate of prisoners in the court system.

== Career ==
Muscowitz passed the bar in 1912 and began a private law practice, mostly representing labor unions. She also campaigned to reform New York City's Women's Night Court and for women's suffrage. Kross was also involved with the Lucy Stone League.

In 1918, Anna Kross became the first woman assistant corporation counsel for New York City. She served in this post until 1923, when she returned to her private practice.

She was appointed magistrate by mayor John P. O'Brien in 1933 and served in this role for 20 years. As a judge, she continued her work advocating for alternative solutions to the problems of prostitution, as well as for domestic violence and other issues affecting women.

She was then appointed New York City Commissioner of Correction by mayor Robert F. Wagner Jr. She was the second woman appointed to the post (after Katharine Bement Davis in 1914) which she held until 1966. Kross was known for her work "wiping out many of the dungeon-like features of the prison system"; her efforts included "installing new shower rooms and mess halls, establishing token wages for some prison jobs, and pushing for more rehabilitation programs."

In 1946 Kross organized and became the presiding Magistrate of the Home Term Court of the Borough of Manhattan, an experimental social court dealing with the problems of disturbed families. In 1951 the Home Term Court became citywide. In 1954 Kross was appointed Commissioner of Correction of New York City. During her tenure she received a great deal of publicity for her outspoken criticism of government policies that discriminated against the poor. She served with the Correction Department until her retirement in 1966 at the age of 75.

Kross advocated for the implementation of psychological and psychiatric social work in the administration of criminal justice and was instrumental in getting trained psychiatrists, vocational guidance workers, religious agencies, and trained medical personnel involved. She successfully fought against the public spectacle of trials of young girls on morals and vice charges, particularly through the establishment of the Wayward Minors Court (now Girls' Term Court) designed exclusively to deal with the problems of adolescent female delinquency. She insisted that not only sex workers, but also their clients be booked. Kross gained wide recognition for her work on behalf of youth, advocating a more judicious attitude toward social problems. This was reflected in her insistence that prison was inappropriate for the indigent, mentally ill, sex workers, or those addicted to drugs or alcohol. She also advocated against the inequities of the bail system. As corrections commissioner, she spearheaded a prisoner plastic surgery program to reduce recidivism amongst released offenders, the Restoration of Youth through training program for young offenders, and redesigning the jail complexes with paint and furniture to promote better mental health.

== Personal life ==
On April 5, 1917, she married surgeon Isidor Kross. They had two daughters, Dr. Helen K. Golden and Dr. Alice K. Frankel.

Anna Moscowitz Kross donated her papers to the Sophia Smith Collection at Smith College between 1975 and 1977: "They relate exclusively to her professional and public life dating from 1905-1974. The bulk of the collection dates from 1954 to the 1960s and covers primarily Kross's career as New York City Commissioner of Correction."

== Death ==
Kross died on August 27, 1979, in The Bronx.

== Legacy ==
The Anna M. Kross Center, one of the jails that comprise the New York City's main jail complex on Riker's Island, was named after her in 1978.

== Awards ==
In 1964, Kross was awarded the first Eleanor Roosevelt Memorial Award, presented to her by Lyndon B. Johnson.
