= New York City Board of Correction =

New York City government agency

Board of Correction

Board overview
- Jurisdiction: New York City
- Employees: 27 (FY 2026)
- Annual budget: $4.1 million (FY 2026)
- Key document: New York City Charter
- Website: www.nyc.gov/boc

The New York City Board of Correction (BOC) is an agency of the New York City government that regulates conditions of confinement, correctional health, and mental health care in city correctional facilities.

== See also ==
- New York City Department of Correction
