= Joseph F. Merrell =

United States Army Medal of Honor recipient (1926–1945)

- Born: August 21, 1926; Staten Island, New York, US
- Died: April 18, 1945 (aged 18) near Nuremberg suburb Lohe, Germany
- Burial place: Saint Peters Cemetery, West New Brighton, New York
- Military career
- Allegiance: United States of America
- Branch: United States Army
- Service years: 1944/1945
- Rank: Private
- Units: 3rd Battalion, 15th Infantry Regiment, 3rd Infantry Division
- Conflicts: World War II
- Awards: Medal of Honor; Purple Heart

Joseph Frederick Merrell (August 21, 1926 – April 18, 1945) was a United States Army soldier and a recipient of the United States military's highest decoration – the Medal of Honor – for his actions in World War II.

Merrell joined the Army from his birthplace of Staten Island in August 1944 (a week after his 18th birthday), and by April 18, 1945, was serving as a private in Company I, 15th Infantry Regiment, 3rd Infantry Division. On that day, near Lohe (a suburb of Nuremberg), Germany, he singlehandedly attacked German positions that were firing on his unit. He disabled two enemy machine gun emplacements and killed nearly two dozen German soldiers before he was himself killed. He was posthumously awarded the Medal of Honor (now on exhibit at Fort Wadsworth) ten months later, on February 26, 1946.

Merrell, aged 18 at his death, was buried in Saint Peters Cemetery, West New Brighton, New York.

== Medal of Honor citation ==
Private Merrell's official Medal of Honor citation reads:

He made a gallant, 1-man attack against vastly superior enemy forces near Lohe, Germany. His unit, attempting a quick conquest of hostile hill positions that would open the route to Nuremberg before the enemy could organize his defense of that city, was pinned down by brutal fire from rifles, machine pistols, and 2 heavy machine guns. Entirely on his own initiative, Pvt. Merrell began a singlehanded assault. He ran 100 yards through concentrated fire, barely escaping death at each stride, and at point blank range engaged 4 German machine pistolmen with his rifle, killing all of them while their bullets ripped his uniform. As he started forward again, his rifle was smashed by a sniper's bullet, leaving him armed only with 3 grenades. But he did not hesitate. He zigzagged 200 yards through a hail of bullets to within 10 yards of the first machine gun, where he hurled 2 grenades and then rushed the position, ready to fight with his bare hands if necessary. In the emplacement, he seized a Luger pistol and killed the Germans that had survived the grenade blast. Rearmed, he crawled toward the second machine gun located 30 yards away, killing 4 Germans in camouflaged foxholes on the way, but himself receiving a critical wound in the abdomen. And yet he went on, staggering, bleeding, disregarding bullets that tore through the folds of his clothing and glanced off his helmet. He threw his last grenade into the machine gun nest and stumbled on to wipe out the crew. He had completed this self-appointed task when a machine pistol burst killed him instantly. In his spectacular 1-man attack, Pvt. Merrell killed 6 Germans in the first machine gun emplacement, 7 in the next, and an additional 10 infantrymen who were astride his path to the weapons that would have decimated his unit had he not assumed the burden of the assault and stormed the enemy positions with utter fearlessness, intrepidity of the highest order, and a willingness to sacrifice his own life so that his comrades could go on to victory.

== Awards and decorations ==

Badge	Combat Infantryman Badge		
1st row	Medal of Honor		
2nd row	Bronze Star Medal	Purple Heart	Army Good Conduct Medal
3rd row	American Campaign Medal	European–African–Middle Eastern Campaign Medal with 1 campaign star	World War II Victory Medal

== Additional honors ==
A former SS barracks in Nürnberg, Germany was acquired by the US Army and renamed the Merrell Barracks. The Merrell Barracks was vacated and returned to the German government in September 1992. A Staten Island Ferry boat was named after him (in service until 1982), it would become a Rikers Island Jail barge named the Harold A. Wildstein. Additionally another boat was named for him as was the US Navy Freighter, the USNS Pvt. Joseph F Merrell. This ship served as a cargo ship during the Korean War and made expeditions to Antarctica in 1957 and again during operations Deep Freeze in the 1960s. The Merrell Valley in Antarctica is named after it. The USNS Pvt. Joseph F Merrell was scrapped in 1974. A plaque dedicated to Private Merrell's honor is in the Clove Lakes Park, Staten Island, NY.

== See also ==
- List of Medal of Honor recipients
