= USNS Pvt. Joseph F. Merrell =

Lt. James E. Robinson-class cargo ship

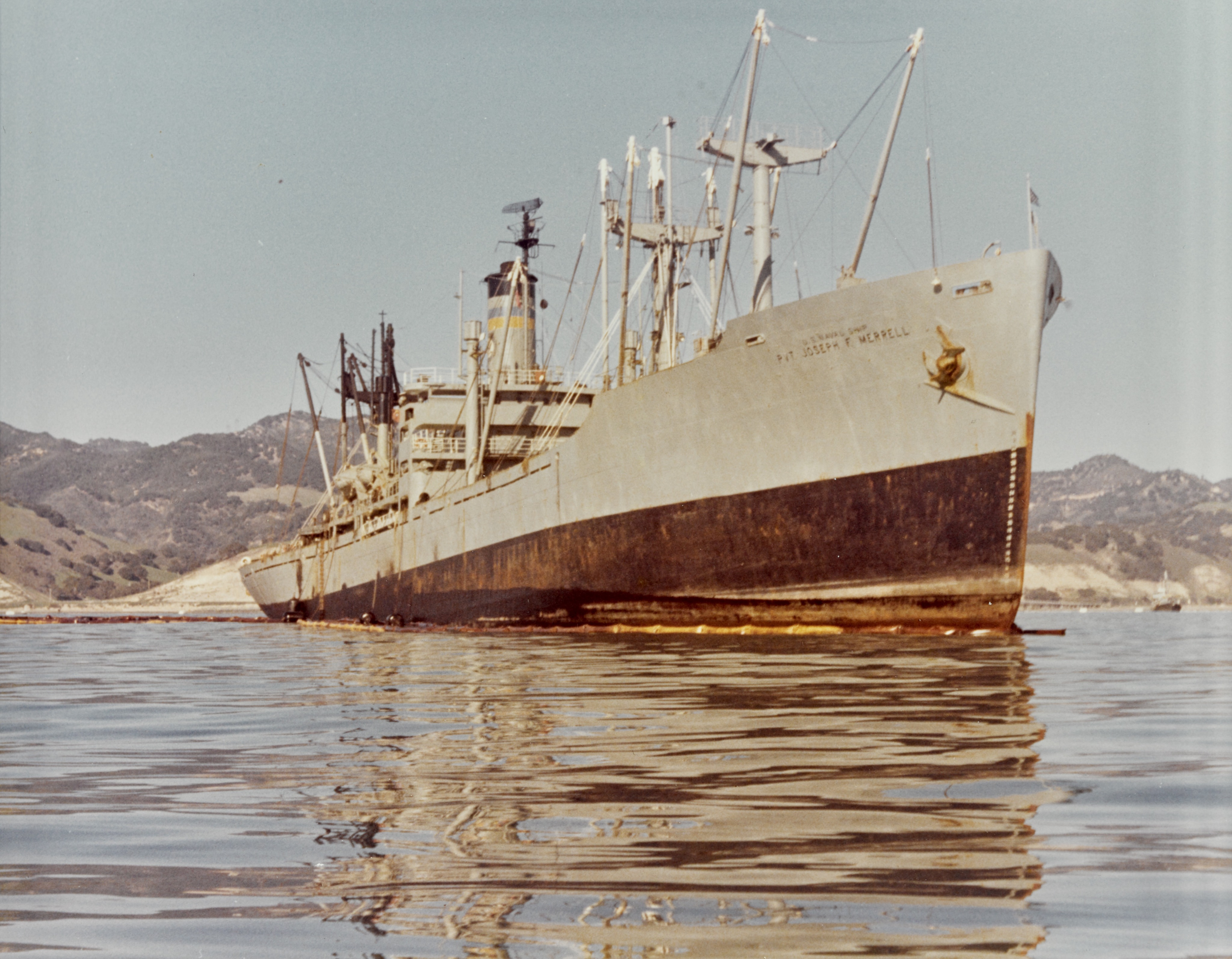
- USNS Pvt. Joseph F. Merrell

History

United States
- Name: Pvt. Joseph F. Merrell
- Namesake: Joseph F. Merrell
- Owner: War Shipping Administration (1944–1947); Maritime Administration (1947–1948); Transportation Corps (1948–1950); United States Navy (1950–1974); Maritime Administration (1974)
- Builder: California Shipbuilding Corporation
- Laid down: March 1943
- Launched: 28 June 1944
- Acquired: 7 August 1944
- Out of service: 26 August 1974
- Renamed: Grange Victory (1944–1948)
- Reclassified: T-AKV-4 (1950)
- Stricken: 26 August 1974
- Identification: Callsign: NCWZ; Hull number: T-AK-275
- Honours and awards: See Awards
- Fate: Scrapped, 1974

General characteristics
- Class & type: Lt. James E. Robinson-class cargo ship
- Displacement: 4,512 metric tons (4,441 long tons), standard; 15,589 metric tons (15,343 long tons), full load
- Length: 455 ft (139 m)
- Beam: 62 ft (19 m)
- Draft: 29 ft 2 in (8.89 m)
- Installed power: 8,500 shp (6,300 kW)
- Propulsion: 1 × steam turbine; 1 × shaft
- Speed: 15.5 knots (28.7 km/h; 17.8 mph)
- Complement: 12 Officers; 87 Enlisted

USNS Pvt. Joseph F. Merrell (T-AK-275), (former SS Grange Victory), was a Victory ship and the second ship of the Lt. James E. Robinson-class cargo ship built in 1944. The ship is named after Private Joseph F. Merrell, an American soldier who was awarded the Medal of Honor during World War II.

== Construction and commissioning ==
The ship was built in 1944 by the California Shipbuilding Corporation, Los Angeles, California. She was delivered to the War Shipping Administration to be used by the Isthmian SS Company as Grange Victory on 7 August 1944.

On 23 November 1946, she was chartered by the Waterman Steamship Corporation until 29 December 1947 where she would be decommissioned and laid up at the Mobile Reserve Fleet after being acquired by the United States Maritime Administration. The ship was then transferred to the Transportation Corps of the US Army on 6 April 1948 and placed in service as USAT Pvt. Joseph F. Merrell.

On 1 March 1950, she was again transferred to the US Navy and put in service as an aircraft transport with the Military Sea Transportation Service as USNS Pvt. Joseph F. Merrell (T-AKV-4). The purpose of Pvt. Joseph F. Merrell was later changed to a cargo ship and re-designated as T-AK-275.

On 9 January 1963, she unloaded cargos in McMurdo Sound, Antarctica during Operation Deep Freeze 63.

On 29 December 1973, Pvt. Joseph F. Merrell had collided with the Liberian freighter Pearl Venture about 50 miles south of Monterey. Almost 400 barrels of fuel had leaked from the Merrell. Navy and Coat Guard worked together to cleanup the area. Merrell was towed to Avila Beach on 30 December to prevent the ship from sinking. Pearl Venture was being repaired in Los Angeles when Merrell arrived at Port Hueneme for repairs on 12 January 1974.

She would finally be returned to the Maritime Administration on 26 August 1974, struck from the Naval Register and sold for $256,600 to the Long Jong Industry. Scrapped on the same day in Kaohsiung.

== Awards ==
- National Defense Service Medal
