= Harold A. Wildstein =

Retired jail barge and ferry vessel

The Harold A. Wildstein (HW), originally named for Private Joseph F. Merrell, was an 168-bed jail barge used to hold inmates for the New York City Department of Corrections. The barge was scrapped on Staten Island but was previously docked on Rikers Island, near Hunts Point.

== History ==
Originally built in 1951, it was used by the Staten Island Ferry. Originally called the Private Joseph F. Merrell being the last two steam ship ferries along with the Cornelius G. Kolff for the Staten Island Ferry. It took on the name of VCBC until the name was transferred to another barge. It was later named after Wildstein, who was a NYC Correctional Civilian Staff worker who was murdered in a robbery. As the population on Rikers Island decreased, the use of the Harold A. Wildstein declined. In 2002, it was shuttered for inmate use, and was put up for sale. In 2004, it was sold for scrap metal and docked in a dock in New Jersey.

== Salvage ==
The Wildstein was finally purchased by a scrapping company until its final demolition after 2004.

== See also ==
List of jail facilities in New York City
