= Brooklyn Detention Complex =

Jail in New York City

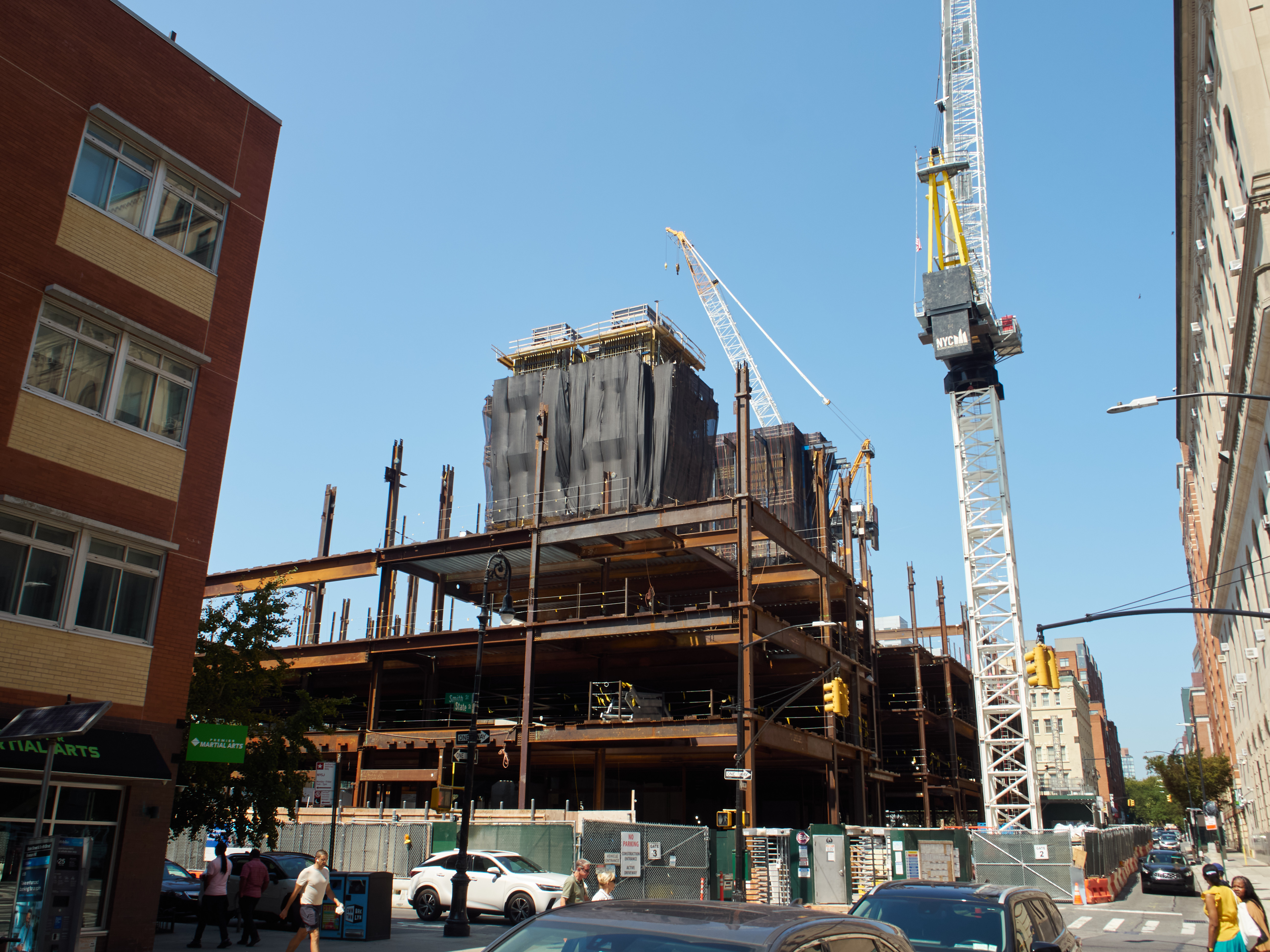
- The new jail being constructed in 2025
- Interactive map of Brooklyn Detention Complex
- Location: 275 Atlantic Ave, Brooklyn New York; 40.6890°N 73.9895°W
- Status: Closed

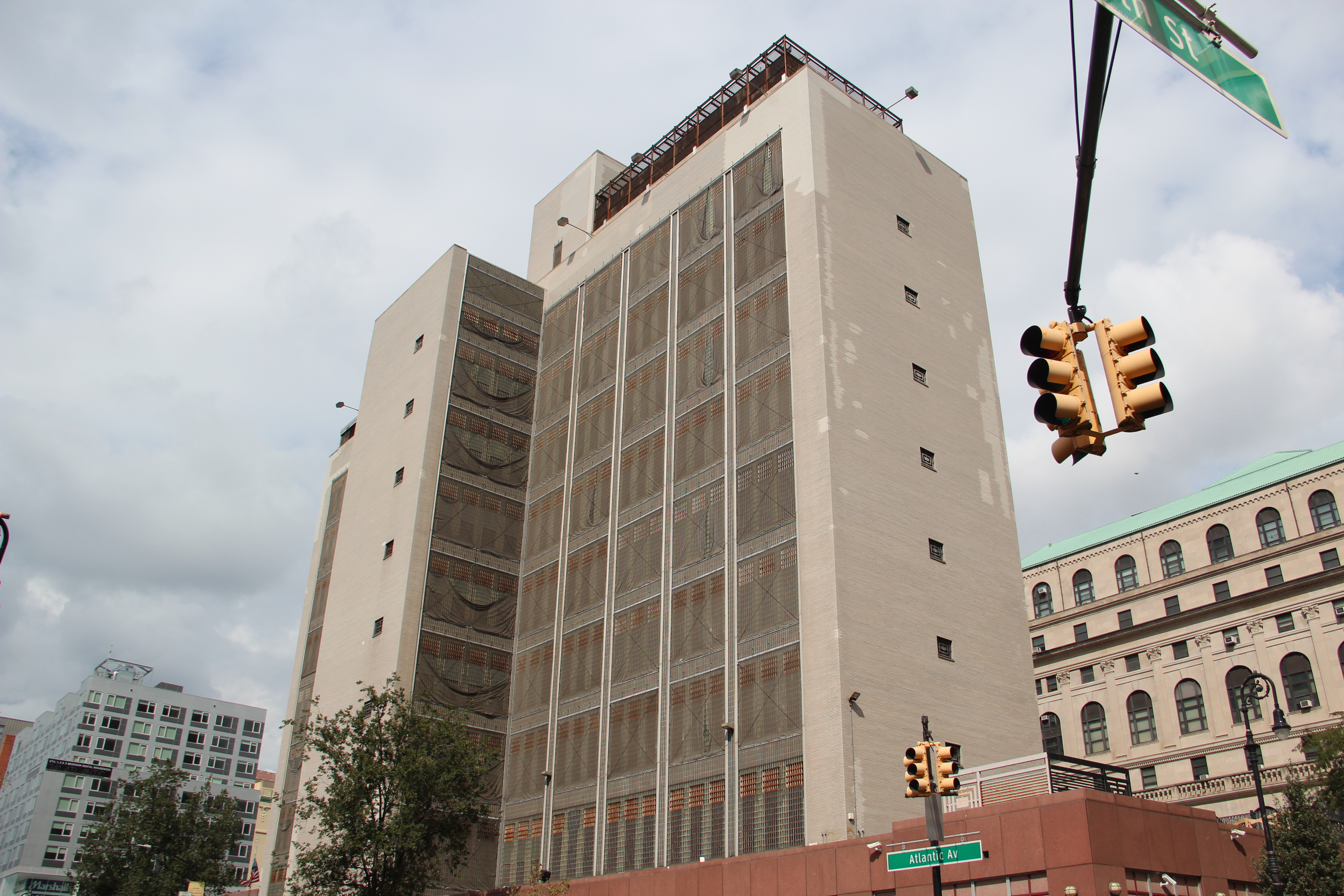
The Brooklyn Detention Complex in 2017

The Brooklyn Detention Complex (originally the Brooklyn House of Detention) was a jail facility located at 275 Atlantic Avenue, in Brooklyn. At full capacity, it was able to house 815 male prisoners in its single cells. Most of the population was made up of detainees undergoing the intake process or awaiting trial in Kings or Richmond County.

Built in the 1950s, the jail closed in 2003 due to a declining inmate population. It reopened in 2012 after renovations with 544 staff.

In 2017, New York City committed to closing the jails on Rikers Island and creating a network of modern borough-based jails instead. The Brooklyn Detention Center was designated as one of the jails that would be used to replace Rikers. In August 2018, the city released a Draft Scope of Work outlining their plan for the new jail, which would tear down the existing 162,000 sq ft. facility and replace it with a building eight times as large (1.4 million sq ft.) and up to 40 stories tall.

In March 2024, plans for the new jail gained traction with the demolition of the old structure. Construction began in 2025, projected to be complete in 2029.
