= Rikers Island =

Island jail complex in New York City

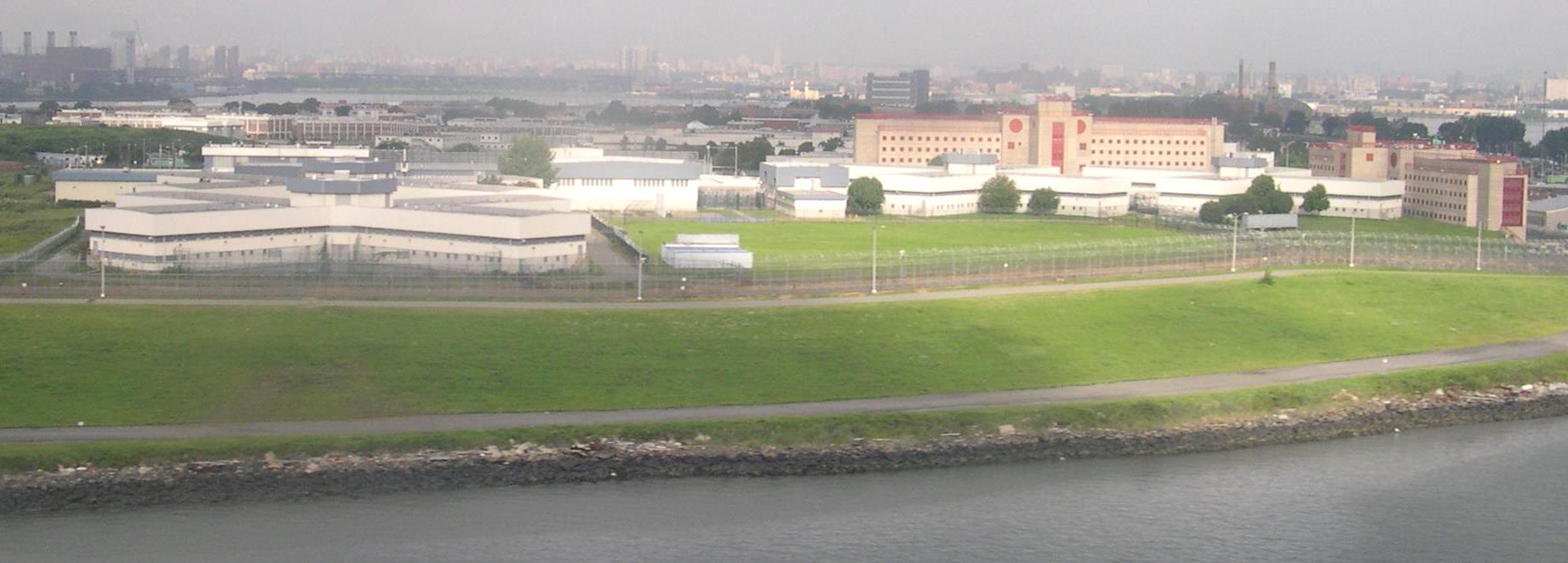
- The island and jail complex, 2004

- Location within New York City
- Location: The Bronx, New York City, United States
- Nearest city: New York City
- Coordinates: 40°47′28″N 73°52′58″W
- Area: 413 acres (167 ha)
- Established: 1932; 94 years ago
- Governing body: Non-city employee remediation manager reporting to Laura Taylor Swain

Rikers Island is a 413-acre (167.14-hectare) prison island in the East River in the Bronx, New York City, United States, that contains New York City's largest jail. It is named after Abraham Rycken, who took possession of the island in 1664. The island was originally under 100 acres (40 ha) in size, but has since grown to more than 400 acres (160 ha). The first stages of expansion were accomplished largely by convict labor hauling in ashes for landfill. The island is politically part of the Bronx, with a controlled-access bridge carrying the MTA Q100 and general traffic to and from Queens. It is part of Queens Community Board 1 and uses an East Elmhurst, Queens, ZIP Code of 11370 for mail.

The island is the site of one of the world's largest correctional institutions and mental institutions, and has been described as New York's best-known jail. The complex, operated by the New York City Department of Correction, in 2015 had a budget of $860 million a year, a staff of 9,000 civilian officers and 1,500 other civilians managing 100,000 admissions per year and an average daily population of 10,000 inmates. The majority (85%) of detainees are pretrial defendants, either held on bail or remanded in custody. The rest of the population have been convicted and are serving short sentences. In a 2021 analysis by the New York City Comptroller Scott Stringer, it costs the city about $556,539 to detain one person for one year at Rikers Island.

Rikers Island has had a reputation for violence, physical and mental abuse, and neglect of its inmates, and has attracted press and judicial scrutiny that has resulted in numerous rulings against the New York City government. Numerous assaults have occurred by inmates on uniformed officers and other civilian staff, often resulting in serious injuries. In May 2013, Rikers Island ranked as one of the 10 worst correctional facilities in the entire United States, based on reporting in Mother Jones magazine. A documented increase in violence on Rikers Island was reported by the 2010s. In 2015, 9,424 assaults happened, the highest number in five years. In October 2019, the New York City Council voted to close down the facility by August 31, 2027. In November 2026, New York City Mayor Zohran Mamdani announced a plan that pushed back the closing of the facility to 2032, replacing it with four smaller borough prisons in the Bronx, Queens, Brooklyn and Manhattan as well as medical facilities for certain inmates. His administration says the delay is necessary because of pushbacks made by the previous administration of Eric Adams. They plan to cut the number of incarcerated inmates from 6,700 to just over 4,000 to fit the new system.

== Complex and facilities ==
The Rikers Island complex, which consists of ten jails, holds local alleged offenders who are awaiting trial. People who are serving sentences of one year or less or are also temporarily detained there, pending transfer to another facility. Rikers Island is therefore not a prison by US terminology, which typically holds offenders serving longer-term sentences. It holds 10 of the New York City Department of Correction's 15 facilities, and can accommodate up to 15,000 detainees.

Facilities located on the island include:

- Robert N. Davoren Complex (primarily male inmates of ages 18–21)
- Eric M. Taylor Center (sentenced male adolescents and adults)
- Otis Bantum Correctional Center (detained male adults)
- George R. Vierno Center (detained male adults)
- Anna M. Kross Center (detained male adults)
- George Motchan Detention Center (detained male adults)
- Rose M. Singer Center (detained and sentenced female adolescents and adults)
- North Infirmary Command (detainees who require medical attention)
- West Facility (detainees with contagious diseases)
- James A. Thomas Center (no longer used to house detainees)
- Harold A. Wildstein barge (no longer in use)
- Walter B. Keane barge (no longer in use)

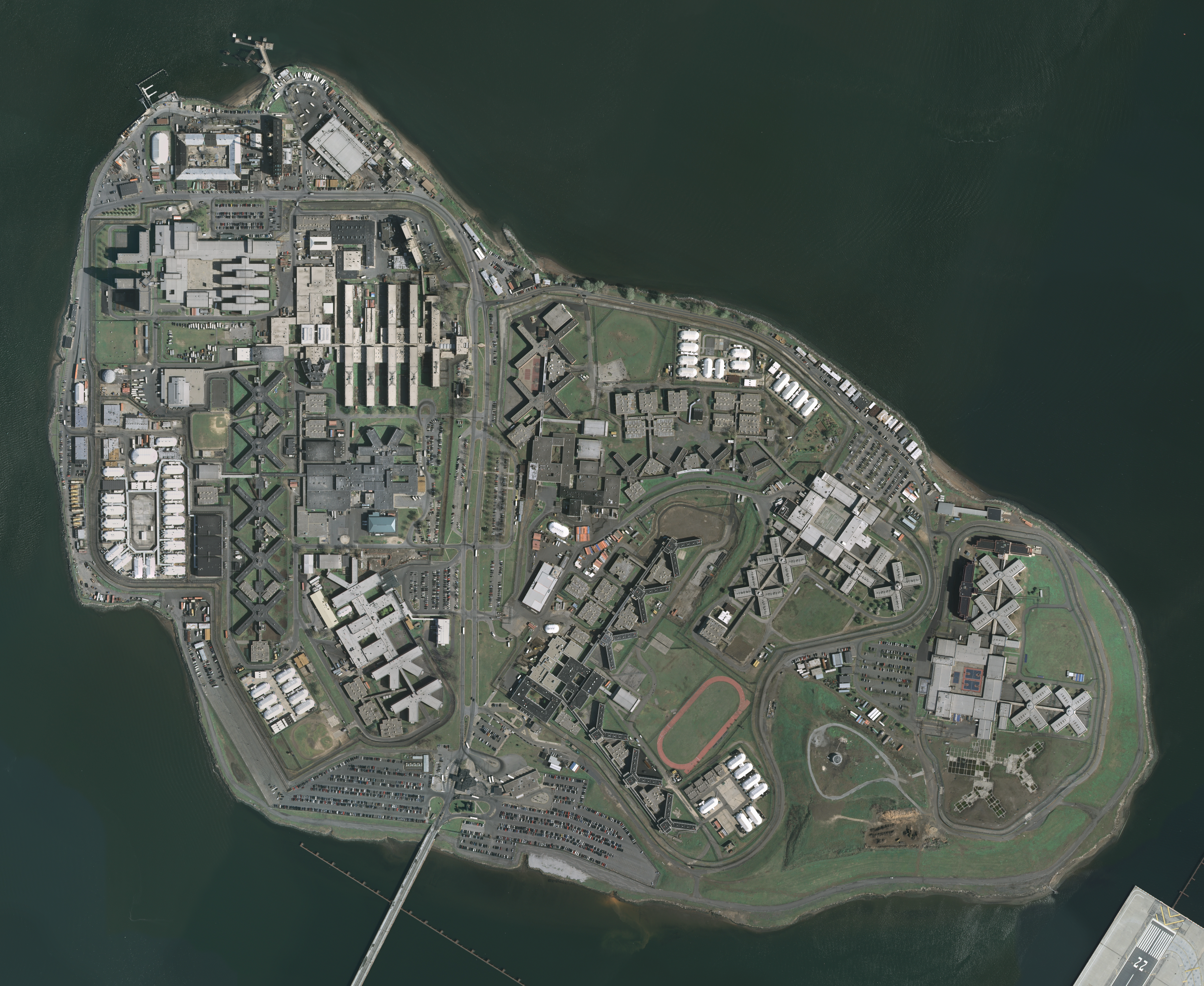
An aerial photo of the jail complex

The average daily individuals in custody or detainees population on the island is about 10,000, although it can hold a maximum of 15,000. The daytime population, including detainees, staff, and visitors, can be as high as 20,000.

The only road access to the island is from Queens, over the 4,200-foot (1,300 m), three-lane Francis Buono Bridge, dedicated in November 1966, by Mayor John Lindsay. The street address is 15 Hazen Street, East Elmhurst, NY 11370. Before the bridge was constructed, the only access to the island was by ferry. Transportation is also provided by the Q100 MTA Regional Bus Operations route. Privately operated shuttles connect the parking lot at the south end to the island. A bus service within the island for people visiting inmates is provided by the New York City Department of Correction on Fridays, Saturdays, and Sundays.

The North Infirmary Command, which used to be called the Rikers Island Infirmary, is used to house inmates requiring extreme protective custody, inmates with special health needs, mentally ill inmates, and inmates undergoing drug detoxification. The infirmary has the capacity to house overflow inmates from conventional populations. The rest of the facilities, all built in the last 67 years, make up this city of jails, in addition to the Vernon C. Bain Correctional Center, a floating barge (described below), as well as schools, medical clinics, ball fields, chapels, gyms, drug rehabilitation programs, grocery stores, barbershops, a bakery, a laundromat, a power plant, a track, a tailor shop, a print shop, a bus depot, and a car wash. It also contains a large composting facility.

== History ==
=== Historic use ===
A 1903 panorama of Rikers Island by Edwin S. Porter

The island is named after Abraham Rycken, a Dutch settler who moved to Long Island in 1638 and took possession of the island in 1664. Rycken's descendants, the Ricker family, owned Rikers Island until 1884, when it was sold to the city for $180,000.

The island was used as a military training ground during the Civil War. The first regiment to use the island was the 9th New York Infantry, also known as Hawkins' Zouaves, which arrived there on May 15, 1861. Hawkins' Zouaves were followed by the 36th New York State Volunteers on June 23, which were followed by the Anderson Zouaves on July 15, 1861. The Anderson Zouaves were commanded by John Lafayette Riker, who was related to the owners of the island.

The camp of the Anderson Zouaves was named Camp Astor in compliment to millionaire John Jacob Astor Jr.. Astor provided funding for the army, and made a significant contribution to the raising of the Anderson Zouaves, with the Astor ladies making the zouave uniforms worn by the recruits of this regiment. Rikers Island was subsequently used by numerous other Civil War regiments, but the name "Camp Astor" was specific to the Anderson Zouaves, and did not become a general name for the military encampment on the island.

In 1883, New York City's Commission of Charities and Corrections expressed an interest in purchasing the island for use as a work-house. Any such purchase would have to be approved by the state. In January 1884, state senator Frederick S. Gibbs introduced a bill in the state senate authorizing the commission to purchase the island. In May 1884, Governor Grover Cleveland signed a bill authorizing the Commissioner of Charities and Corrections to purchase the island for a sum no greater than $180,000.

At the time, the island was within the boundaries of Long Island City in Queens County, which was not yet part of New York City. This potential transfer set off squabbling between politicians of Long Island City, Queens County, and New York City. On July 31, 1884, a compromise was agreed to by all three entities. New York City agreed to pay $3,000, with $2,500 given to Long Island City and $500 to Queens County. On August 4, 1884, the Commissioner of Charities and Corrections, Jacob Hess, signed a contract purchasing the island from John T. Wilson, a descendant of the Ryker family, for $180,000. $179,000 went to Wilson and $1,000 for a title search.

=== Conversion to jail ===
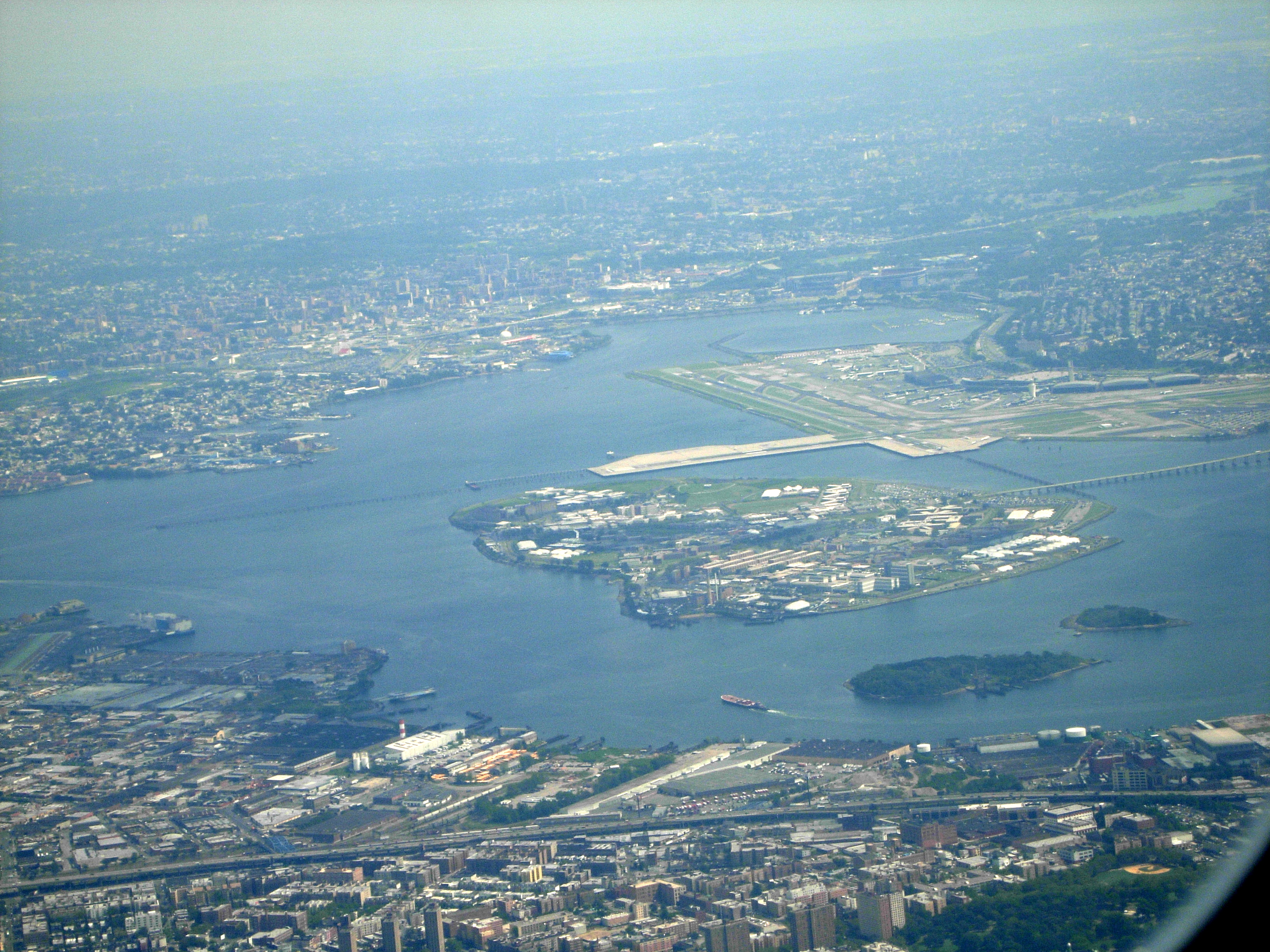
An aerial photo of Rikers Island, photographed from the north. LaGuardia Airport and its 4/22 runway stretch is visible, 250 feet (76.2 m) from the island. Shea Stadium can be seen across Flushing Bay.

The city expressed a desire to open a jail for men on Rikers Island as early as 1908, in order to replace their overburdened and dilapidated jail on Welfare Island, now Roosevelt Island. The jail was opened in 1932. Landfill continued to be added to the island until 1943, eventually enlarging the original 90-acre (36 ha) island to 415 acres (168 ha). This required the permission of the federal government, since the expansion extended the island's pier line. 200 acres (81 ha) were also stripped from Rikers to help fill in the new North Beach Airport, which opened in 1939 and was later renamed LaGuardia Airport.

The net expansion of the island enabled the jail facilities to expand. The original penitentiary building, completed in 1935, was called HDM, or the House of Detention for Men. It became a maximum security facility called the James A. Thomas Center and closed due to structural issues in 2000.

In 1922, New York City was banned by the courts from dumping garbage in the ocean. Much of it ended up on Rikers Island, though the island already had 12 mountains of garbage 40 to 130 feet tall. Rikers took in 1.5 million cubic yards of additional refuse, more than the amount of soil displaced by the building of the World Trade Center. Since much of the garbage was composed of ash from coal heating and incinerators, spontaneous phosphorescent fires were frequent, even in the wintertime, in the snow. One warden described it in 1934: "At night, it is like a forest of Christmas trees – first one little light ... then another, until the whole hillside is lit up with little fires. ... It was beautiful."

The island was plagued with rats, which at one point were so prevalent that after "poison gas, poison bait, ferocious dogs, and pigs" failed to control them, one New Yorker tried to organize a hunting party to kill them off. It took the efforts of city planner Robert Moses, who did not want the unsightly island to be the backdrop for his carefully landscaped 1939 World's Fair, to get the island cleaned up, and have the city's garbage sent elsewhere — ultimately to the Fresh Kills Landfill on Staten Island.

During the term of David Dinkins as mayor of New York, the jail filled to overflowing. The Vernon C. Bain Correctional Center (VCBC), an 800-bed barge, was installed on the East River at the end of Hunts Point near the Fulton Fish Market to accommodate the extra inmates. The keel for the Vernon C. Bain was laid in 1989 at the Avondale Shipyard in New Orleans. Upon completion, VCBC was towed up from Louisiana to its current mooring, and attached to two "Crandall Arms". It opened for use as a facility in 1992. Originally it had been leased to the NYC Department of Juvenile Justice, while Spofford Juvenile Center was under reconstruction. VCBC was formerly known as Maritime Facility #3 (MTF3); facilities 1 and 2 were reconstructed British military transport barges, or BIBBYs (British Industries Boat Building Yard), used during the Falklands War, both of which could house 800 soldiers, but only 200 inmates after their conversion. MTFs 1 and 2 were anchored on either side of Manhattan at East River pier 17, near 20th street, in the Hudson River. In addition, two smaller 1950s-era Staten Island Ferry boats were converted to house 162 inmates each. The ferry boats were sold for salvage around 2003, and the owner of the shipyard that built VCBC, Avondale Shipyard, bought the two BIBBYs. VCBC is the only vessel of its type in the world. Prior to modification for use by New York City, it cost $161 million to construct. The initial plan for acquiring the vessel, because of the way New York City makes capital purchases, had to begin at least five years before the keel was laid, during the tenure of Ed Koch.

=== Notable events ===
Rikers is close to the runways of LaGuardia Airport. On February 1, 1957, Northeast Airlines Flight 823 crashed onto Rikers Island shortly after departing LaGuardia Airport, killing 20 and injuring 78 out of a total of 95 passengers and six crew. After the crash, department personnel and inmates ran to the site to help survivors. As a result of their actions, of the 57 inmates who assisted with the rescue effort, 30 were released and 16 received a sentence reduction of six months by the NYC Parole Board. Governor Averell Harriman also granted commutation of sentence to 11 men serving definite sentences, two received a six-months' reduction; one workhouse and eight penitentiary definites became eligible for immediate release.

In 1993, United Blood Nation was founded by Omar Portee and Leonard McKenzie while locked up in the George Mochen Detention Center at Rikers Island.

A drawing by artist Salvador Dalí, done as an apology because he was unable to attend a talk about art for the prisoners at Rikers Island, hung in the inmate dining room in JATC (HDM) from 1965 to 1981, when it was moved to the prison lobby in EMTC (C76) for safekeeping. The drawing was stolen in March 2003 and replaced with a fake. Three correctional officers and an assistant deputy warden were arrested and charged, and though the three later pleaded guilty and one was acquitted, the drawing has not been recovered.

During the AIDS crisis in the 1980s and 1990s, at the request of the Association for Drug Abuse Prevention and Treatment (ADAPT) and the Executive Director Yolanda Serrano, the prison granted early release to terminal HIV-positive inmates so that they could die peacefully in their own homes.

The prison housed juvenile inmates until 2018. The move was prompted by a law passed by New York in 2017 requiring that juvenile inmates under 18 be housed separately from adults.

=== Proposed closure of jail complex ===
In April 1978, New York state legislators received a proposal from Herb Sturz, then deputy mayor of criminal justice for mayor Ed Koch, to buy or lease Rikers Island from the city government, thus closing it as a city-wide jail. The city would use the proceeds to build local jails in the boroughs. By November 1978, $35 million was appropriated for the first phase of the deal. In June 1979, the state and city completed a Rikers lease agreement. Sturz said: It gives us the opportunity to build modern, constitutional, humane facilities near the courthouses. In July 1979, controversy surrounding the lease of Rikers rose. A new report indicated operating costs would increase and faulted some of Sturz's Rikers report. The lease deal with the state was in jeopardy. Sturz became the City Planning Commission Chairman in December 1979 and the effort to close Rikers by selling it to the State was shelved.

In February 2016, the Independent Commission on New York City Criminal Justice and Incarceration Reform, also known as the Lippman Commission, since it is chaired by former Chief Judge of the State of New York Jonathan Lippman, was convened by New York City Council Speaker Melissa Mark-Viverito to review the entirety of the city's criminal justice system.

According to Lippman, Sturz laid the groundwork for the Commission in December 2015 and January 2016 by taking Lippman to speak with Mayor Bill de Blasio and many others inside and outside of city government. Once appointed, Lippman spoke with Sturz on a daily basis on who should be members and how to fund the commission.

In April of that year, Glenn E. Martin launched a campaign that called for the closure of the Rikers Island Jail Complex. In September 2016, the campaign organized a march from Queens Plaza to the Rikers Island Bridge, calling on then-Mayor Bill de Blasio to close the complex.

In the months following, plans had been made to build an additional facility on the island that consisted of 1,500 beds. In November 2016, New York City Department of Correction Commissioner Joseph Ponte said, "As we look at construction and now with the...kind of the movement to close Rikers all those things politically have to be taken into consideration. So the 1,500-bed facility on Rikers is still at...at a kind of pause right now".

After a year of consideration, the Lippmann Commission released a report of recommendations for closing the jail complex. De Blasio did not specifically endorse the findings of the commission. The Lippman Commission proposed a 10-year plan to close the ten jails currently on the island and replace them with smaller jails, one in each borough closer to the courthouses. The population at Rikers Island would have to decrease from current average of 10,000 to approximately 5,000. According to The Mayor's Office of Criminal Justice, key strategies in shrinking the Rikers population have included addressing causes of case delays, identifying individuals that could be granted alternatives to jail time, and improving programming and discharge services. Since 1991, the Rikers population has dropped by more than 50%, when the average daily population was 21,688. The idea of closing the prison complex within 10 years was endorsed by former Mayor Bill de Blasio on March 31, after the New York Post leaked the findings of the Lippman Commission.

One possible reuse proposal was to build a low-rise residential development, although the island's distance from mass transit, proximity to LaGuardia Airport, and leakage of toxic methane gas from its landfill base would pose problems for the proposed development. It would also mean that each residential unit would cost about twice as much to construct as a normal unit in New York City. The residential development would connect the island to the mainland for the expansion of the airport, using it as a park, for solid-waste management or for manufacturing. However, the commission specifically ruled out its use for private residences. In light of possible closure of the jail complex, New York City Public Advocate Letitia James suggested renaming the island after Kalief Browder, an inmate who committed suicide after being jailed at Rikers.

Another possibility for reuse of the island after closure of the jail complex would be to build an expansion of nearby LaGuardia Airport. According to a 2017 city-sponsored report, incorporating Rikers Island into the airport's footprint would allow for the construction of a new, longer runway and additional terminal space, resulting in an estimated 40% increase of flight capacity.

On June 22, 2017, former Mayor de Blasio released his plan for a 10-year shutdown of the facility, saying that it was not a "quick fix": "This will be a long a difficult path," he wrote. The city will reduce the inmate population of Rikers through the use of alternative facilities and reforms such as making the payment of bail easier and improving mental health facilities and programs. Two "diversion centers" will assist people with mental health problems and will work with police to find options other than incarceration. Smaller jail facilities will be open throughout the city, but the plan does not fully describe how, where, and when that will occur.

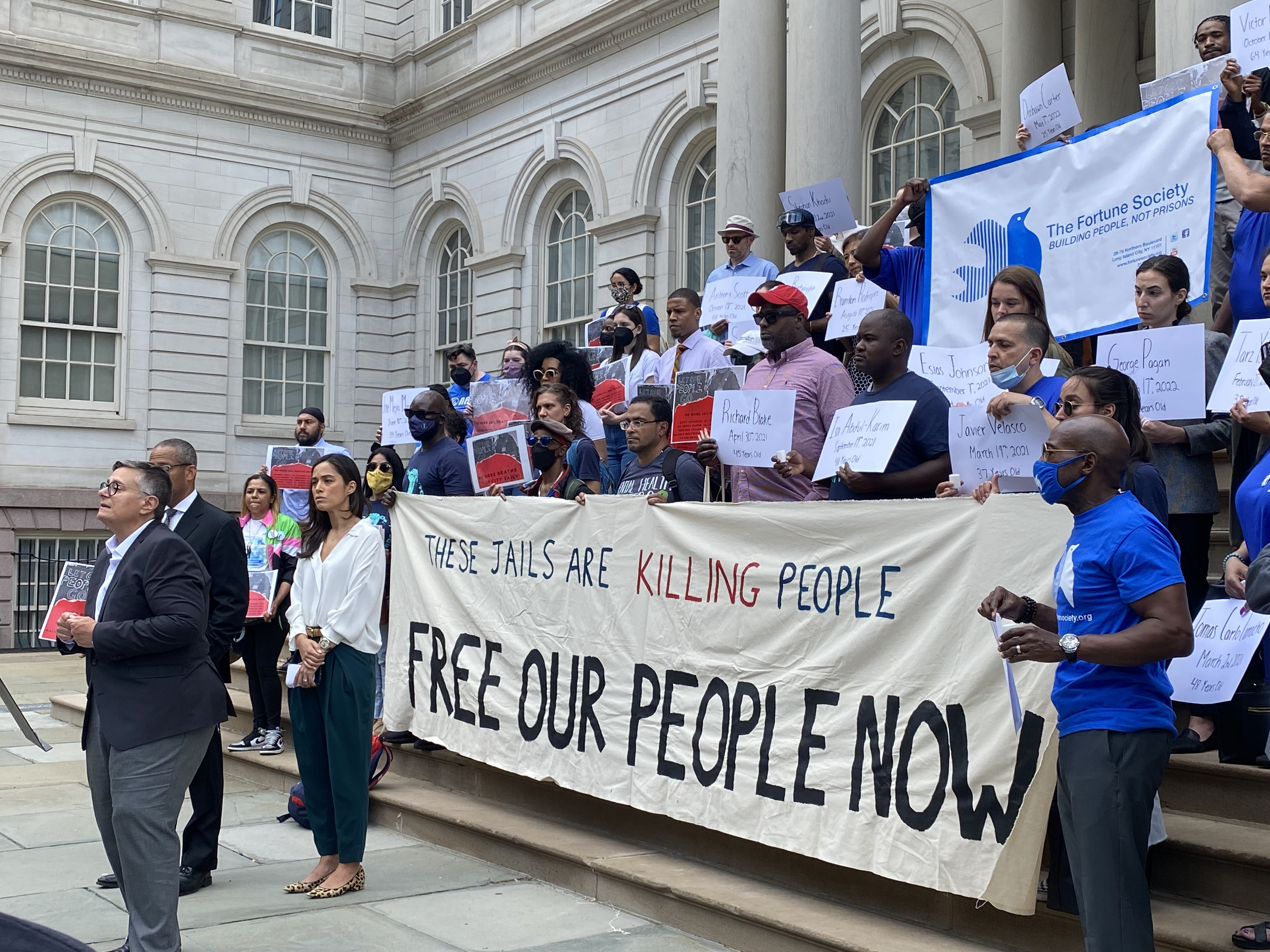
Press conference and rally to close Rikers after a string of inmate deaths

The New York State Commission of Correction, which oversees New York City's jails, issued a report in February 2018 citing numerous violations in the facility on the part of the city and a significant increase in violent incidents from 2016 to 2017. It suggested that the state might move to close Rikers Island before the city's 10-year deadline, which is not legally binding. On October 17, 2019, the City Council voted for an over $8 billion plan to close the Rikers Island prisons and other New York City jails by 2026, and replace them with four borough-based jails. New prisons are planned, but council members said that a move from arrests to tickets, not prosecuting misdemeanors, and a state law set to eliminate cash bail for misdemeanors would reduce the need for jails.

In 2025, the Eric Adams administration authored an executive order to re-establish an office for Immigration and Customs Enforcement and other federal law enforcement agencies on the island after a 10-year hiatus. On May 13, 2025, federal judge Laura Taylor Swain ordered the complex to be run by an official reporting directly to the court. Swain found that the current management system could not remedy the issues sufficiently quickly and that the city had not complied with court orders for years, sometimes in ways that seemed like bad faith.

In November 2026, mayor Zohran Mamdani and Department of Corrections commissioner Stanley Richards announced plans to close the prison in 2032, and replace it with facilities located in the boroughs, combined with immediate changes in department policies and operations.

== Abuse, neglect, and murder of detainees ==
By the mid-2010s, Rikers Island had become notorious for a "culture of abuse", and has been subject to a number of investigations and rulings.

=== Rulings related to strip searches ===
In 1986, a federal appeals court ruled that strip searches could not be performed on people arrested on misdemeanor charges, like fare evasion on the subway, or marijuana smoking. The case itself was brought by Ann Weber, who was arrested for making an inflated claim on a 911 call, after her son was attacked while leaving her daughter's wedding. She was brought to jail still dressed in formal wedding attire, locked in a cell, and forced to strip and expose her cavities for search in the hour it took for her daughter to arrive and post bail.

Prior to this decision, all prisoners taken to Rikers, no matter the level of their accusation, were strip searched. These searches often took place in groups of 10 to 12 and involved genital and anal searches. Despite the court's ruling, the practice lived on, costing New York City a total of $81 million in settlements to the victims of these illegal searches. In 2001, a ruling was reached in New York reinforcing the illegality of strip searches for misdemeanor detainees, and demanding that the city pay up to $50 million to the tens of thousands of people who were illegally searched over the years.

However, the practice did not die. Another suit was filed against the city in 2007 for performing strip searches on inmates taken to Rikers on misdemeanor charges. On October 4, 2007, the New York City Department of Corrections conceded that tens of thousands of nonviolent inmates taken to Rikers Island on misdemeanor charges had been wrongly strip-searched in violation of a 2002 court settlement, and were entitled to payment for damages. The policy was kept in place despite a United States Court of Appeals for the Second Circuit ruling in 2001 that strip-searches of misdemeanor suspects were illegal, unless officials suspected that they were carrying contraband..." [Lead lawyer Richard D.] Emery charged in his papers that department officials "repeatedly resorted to lying to cover up deliberate indifference to the continued practice of humiliating detainees by forcing them to strip naked in groups." This class action suit won $33 million in damages.

=== Inmates as enforcers ===
In February 2008, correctional officer Lloyd Nicholson was indicted after he allegedly used a select group of teenage inmates as enforcers under a regime called "the program", as well as allegedly beating inmates himself. However, "the program" has been known to exist for well over a decade and is unique to the adolescents. The inmates use it as a test for other inmates and a system of control among themselves.

A Village Voice article lists a roll call of 2008 scandals at Rikers, including the case of officers who allegedly passed accused cop killer Lee Woods marijuana, cigarettes, and alcohol; the February indictment of correctional officer Lloyd Nicholson who used inmates as "enforcers", and the April 27 suicide of 18-year-old Steven Morales (who allegedly killed his infant daughter) in the high-security closed-custody unit.

On February 4, 2009, The New York Times reported that "the pattern of cases suggests that city correctional officials have been aware of a problem in which Rikers guards have acquiesced or encouraged violence among inmates." The Times added that "There have been at least seven lawsuits filed in Federal District Court in Manhattan accusing guards of complicity or acquiescence in inmate violence at Rikers, a complex of 10 detention facilities which, along with several other jails around the city, hold about 13,000 prisoners, most of whom are pretrial detainees. None of the seven suits has gone to trial. In the three that were settled, the city admitted no liability or wrongdoing."

=== Sexual assault ===
In a July 2008 rape case reported by The Village Voice on August 5, 2008, a woman being held on grand-larceny charges for the past three months stated that someone entered her cell in the 1,000-bed Rose M. Singer Center as she slept, sometime before 6 a.m. on July 3, 2008, bound and gagged her with bedsheets, and sexually assaulted her with a dildo-like object, with other inmates having possibly functioned as lookouts during the crime. At about 6 a.m. an officer and a captain discovered her lying on her back on the floor of her cell, blindfolded and with bedsheets wrapped around her neck, mouth, and legs. The incident was reported to central command at 7:30 a.m., and the woman was transported to the Elmhurst Hospital Center. A central question that arose was how the incident could have taken place, in light of the fact that the woman did not share a cell with anyone. Officials would not comment on the investigation, nor whether any arrests were made.

=== Officer brutality ===
On June 1, 2007, Captain Sherman Graham and Assistant Deputy Warden Gail Lewis were arrested by the New York City Department of Investigation (DOI) for covering up an assault on an inmate. The arrest came after both were indicted by a Bronx grand jury. It is alleged that on October 4, 2006, Graham assaulted an inmate after he refused to comply with strip searching procedures at the Robert N. Davoren Center (RNDC, C-74). The assault occurred in front of 15 correctional academy recruits in training. After the assault, Graham ordered the recruits to write on their Use of Force Witness Reports that Graham assaulted the inmate in self-defense after the inmate punched Graham. Lewis, who was Graham's supervisor, did not intervene to stop the attack. Lewis also submitted a false Use of Force Witness Report. Charges against Graham include 16 counts of falsifying business records, 16 counts of offering a false instrument for filing in the first degree, 16 counts of official misconduct, a class A misdemeanor and one count of attempted assault in the third degree. Lewis was charged with falsifying business records, offering a false instrument for filing and official misconduct. The investigation started when the DOI received a tip following an anti-corruption presentation at the academy in October 2006 on the day before graduation.

Graham and Lewis were found guilty on all charges by a Bronx jury on May 14, 2012. It took the jury approximately three hours to deliberate a guilty verdict. Lewis was able to retire in December 2009 with her pension. Graham was terminated from the Department of Correction following the guilty verdict. Each faced up to four years in prison; however, Graham and Lewis were both sentenced to 500 hours of community service and ordered to pay $1,000.00 in fines on August 7, 2012.

=== Solitary confinement ===
The New York City Department of Correction reported that in fiscal year 2012 more than 14.4 percent of adolescents detained at Rikers Island between the ages of 16 and 18 were held in at least one period of solitary confinement while detained. The average length of time young people spent in solitary confinement at Rikers Island was 43 days. More than 48 percent of adolescents at this institution have diagnosed mental health problems.

On August 28, 2014, a law was passed boosting oversight of the use of solitary confinement at Rikers Island, following intense public outcry after various abuses at the prison. The law requires the prison to publish quarterly reports on their use of solitary confinement, but did not include provisions regarding the protection of prisoners against guard brutality or limiting the use of solitary confinement as a punishment.

The solitary confinement unit at Rikers is commonly referred to as "Bing", the inmates kept there known as "Bing monsters".

==== Kalief Browder ====
Kalief Browder was accused of stealing a backpack at the age of 16. His family was unable to make his $3,000 bail, later being unable to post bail due to a probation violation. Browder was imprisoned without trial or conviction for three years, his trial postponed on numerous occasions. The case was eventually dismissed, and Browder was released in June 2013 by Judge Patricia DiMango after numerous postponements and 31 hearings in front of judges. For two of those years, Browder was held in solitary confinement or punitive segregation. He was profiled in The New Yorker in October 2014 for being held for three years on Rikers Island without a trial.

On June 6, 2015, Browder died by suicide by hanging. The conditions of his detention were widely seen as having caused his mental condition. He had multiple prior suicide attempts while incarcerated. Days after his death, U.S. Supreme Court Justice Anthony Kennedy invoked Browder's experience in his opinion on Davis v. Ayala. On January 25, 2016, President Barack Obama wrote an article in The Washington Post criticizing the "overuse" of solitary confinement in American jails, basing his arguments largely on Browder's case. He signed an executive order banning solitary confinement of juveniles in federal prisons.

=== Treatment of mentally ill ===
In 2014, Mayor de Blasio began to take action against the abuse by adding surveillance cameras and improving care for mentally ill prisoners.

On September 29, 2014, Judge Tynia Richard offered a sharp rebuke to the Department of Corrections, recommending that six correctional officers be fired. This group, led by Captain Budnarine Behari, had participated in the brutal beating of Robert Hinton, a mentally ill inmate, while he was hog-tied, because he had protested being moved from his cell by sitting down. Hinton's fellow inmates watched as he was dragged down the hallways while hog-tied to a solitary confinement cell where he was beaten. While this ruling was one of the most severe against the Department of Corrections in many years, almost two years had elapsed between the beating and the Justice Department's ruling, during which time the perpetrators in this attack were involved in more inmate beatings at Rikers Island.

=== Treatment of LGBT inmates ===
The segregated unit at Rikers for LGBT prisoners, known as "gay housing", was closed in December 2005 citing a need to improve security. The unit had opened in the 1970s due to concerns about abuse of LGBT prisoners in pretrial detention. The New York City Department of Correction's widely criticized plan was to restructure the classification of prisoners and create a new protective custody system which would include 23-hour-per-day lockdown (identical to that mandated for disciplinary reasons) for moving vulnerable inmates to other facilities. Whereas formerly all that was required was a declaration of homosexuality or the appearance of being transgender, inmates wanting protective custody would now be required to request it in a special hearing. "In 2015, city corrections officials opened what was then called the Transgender Housing Unit. Many detainees didn't know about or couldn't get into the dorm, which could only house a few dozen, but nonetheless it was one of just a handful of such specialized facilities across the country. Three years later, spurred by LGBTQ+ advocates, the mayor's office announced that the Department of Correction would house incarcerated people consistent with their gender identity."

"Eric Adams, a former NYPD captain, swept into the mayor's office promising a pro-law enforcement agenda that included supporting the old guard that had long decided how things ran on the island. Adams replaced the reform-minded jails commissioner Vincent Schiraldi with his own pick, Louis Molina, whose administration immediately pushed out top department leaders supportive of the LGBTQ+ unit and shelved a draft policy directive aimed at getting more trans and gender-nonconforming detainees into gender-aligned housing. This institutional reversal has stranded numerous trans and gender-nonconforming detainees in dangerous, male housing units for weeks or months on end, subjecting many to egregious forms of physical and sexual violence, according to dozens of internal emails, Department of Correction records, and interviews with more than 20 people who work or live in city jails, including current and former corrections staffers, incarcerated trans women, jail guards and attorneys."

=== Federal investigation ===
In August 2014, US Attorney for the Southern District of New York, Preet Bharara, issued a report condemning the systematic abuse and violation of prisoners' constitutional rights. Despite this and many other egregious incidents of abuse, few correctional officers have been prosecuted successfully or even removed from their positions. Also in August 2014, Bharara issued a damning report on the treatment of juvenile prisoners at Rikers. The report identified "a pattern and practice of conduct at Rikers that violates the constitutional rights of adolescent inmates". The report describes the "rampant use of unnecessary and excessive force by DOC staff", as well as dangers to inmates including inadequate protection from violence caused by other inmates, a culture that uses violence as a means to control inmates, and heavy use of solitary confinement ("punitive segregation") for discipline. The report details the guards' frequent use of violence, including "headshots" (blows to the head or face), particularly in areas without video surveillance. This violence is perpetrated as punishment or retribution against the inmates, or "In response to inmates' verbal altercations with officers".

=== COVID-19 crisis ===
During the COVID-19 pandemic in New York City, inmates at Rikers were unable to follow the safety measures suggested by the Centers for Disease Control and Prevention to avoid contracting COVID-19. Inmates, correctional officers, the DOT, and the head doctor at Rikers warned that better precautionary measures should be put in place, and that non-violent inmates should be released, making arguments in the name of public health. One inmate said, "The hygiene in here is really nasty. There are roaches and mice in the dorms and rats in the hallway. It's a good place for disease to hang out. I don't want to be kept in here for this whole coronavirus thing. I plan to do my whole sentence, that's fine, but this is just crazy." On March 22, 2020, it was reported that two dorms of 45 inmates each were carrying out a strike in protest of the lack of PPE, social distancing, and cleaning supplies, and demanding the release of all inmates who met the criteria specified by the Board of Correction. In summer 2020, about 2500 inmates were released from Rikers on early COVID Release. In February 2021, The New York Times featured an article by former inmate Michele Evans criticizing the jail's handling of the pandemic. By October 2021, The New York Times reported that as a result of staff shortages exacerbated by the COVID pandemic, inmates were virtually running the jail and lawlessness, violence and chaos reigned.

== Detainee deaths ==
=== Jason Echevarria ===
On August 18, 2012, inmate Jason Echevarria swallowed a packet of powdered detergent, which had been given to inmates to clean out their cells after there was a leakage of raw sewage from the toilets. Echevarria began vomiting and complaining of severe pain. Terrence Pendergrass, the supervisor of the unit, was told by a correctional officer of Echevarria's condition. According to The New York Times, "... the captain told the officer not to bother him unless 'there was a dead body,' the complaint said". Several correctional officers passed through his unit but he received no medical attention and was found dead in his cell the following morning. The medical examiner ruled his death a homicide, citing "neglect and denial of medical care".

Jason Echevarria suffered from bipolar disorder and was housed in the unit reserved for mentally ill inmates. At one point, he had been placed in solitary confinement after several suicide attempts.

Terrence Pendergrass was demoted and suspended without pay, following the incident, and in December 2014, he was convicted of one count of denying Echevarria medical care, resulting in death. In June 2015, Terrence Pendergrass was sentenced to five years in prison. In November 2015, Echevarria's family was awarded a $3.8 million settlement regarding the matter.

=== Ronald Spear ===
In 2012, 52-year-old Ronald Spear was awaiting trial on Rikers Island, and due to kidney failure, he was detained in the North Infirmary Command. He walked with a cane and wore a bracelet that read "risk of fall". On December 19, 2012, Spear left his dormitory and demanded to see a doctor.

Brian Coll, a correctional officer, and Ronald Spear got into an altercation when Spear was told by the doctor that he could not be seen until later that day. Coll began punching Spear in the face and body. According to The New York Times, "Another officer grabbed Mr. Spear and with Mr. Taylor's help [Byron Taylor, former correctional officer], pinned him down. The complaint says Mr. Coll kicked Mr. Spear several times in the head, and knelt down, telling him, 'Remember that I'm the one who did this to you'". When a Rikers Island medical team reached Spear, he was unresponsive, and after failed attempts to revive him, he was pronounced dead. An investigation into the incident found that Coll and two other officers conspired to cover up how Spear died.

In 2016, Brian Coll was convicted of one count of death resulting from deprivation of rights under color of law, one count of conspiracy to obstruct justice, one count of obstruction of justice, one count of filing false forms, and one count of conspiracy to file false forms. He was sentenced for 30 years in prison. Byron Taylor pleaded guilty to one count of perjury for lying to a federal grand jury, and one count of conspiracy to obstruct justice. Anthony Torres pleaded guilty to one count of conspiracy to obstruct justice and file false reports, and one count of filing a false report.

=== Bradley Ballard ===
Bradley Ballard, who suffered from schizophrenia and diabetes, was sent to Rikers in June 2013 on a parole violation for failure to report an address change. In July, he was sent to the psychiatric prison ward at Bellevue Hospital Center, where he stayed for 38 days before being sent back to Rikers.

On September 4, 2013, Ballard was locked in his cell as punishment for making inappropriate gestures at a female correctional officer. According to The New York Times, "the lawsuit said, 'Not a single nurse, doctor or other medical or mental health provider entered his cell'". On September 11, Ballard died at the age of 39, having been confined inside his cell for seven days without access to his medication or medical treatment. When officers finally came to the aid of Ballard, he was naked, unresponsive, and covered in feces. His genitals were swollen and badly infected due to the result of injuries suffered after he tied a band around his penis.

According to The New York Times, some 129 inmates, 77% of whom were diagnosed as mentally ill, suffered "serious injuries" in altercations with prison guards over an 11-month period in 2013. These injuries were "beyond the capacity" of the prison doctors to treat successfully. Another Times article stated that "the lawsuit said, 'Rather than provide the critical care required' medical staff and correctional officers 'who knew Mr. Ballard could not survive without medication, essentially stood by and watched as Mr. Ballard languished, deteriorated and ultimately died.'" In 2016, the city agreed to pay $5.75 million to settle the lawsuit.

=== Jerome Murdough ===
On February 15, 2014, Jerome Murdough, a homeless veteran in jail on an accusation of trespassing, was found dead in his cell. After being in jail for one week, he died from overexposure to heat. His cell was over 100 ˚F, and he had taken prescription drugs which increase sensitivity to heat. Murdough had been complaining for hours about the heat but was ignored by prison guards. Murdough had been arrested for camping out on the stairwell of a New York Housing Authority building during the freezing polar vortex of 2014; his bail was set at $2,500. A settlement of $2.25 million occurred.

=== Rolando Perez ===
In January 2014, Rolando Perez was arrested for petty burglary and awaiting trial at Rikers. Perez suffered from a severe seizure disorder since the age of 16 and had taken medication to control his seizures ever since. Perez was being detained in solitary confinement after getting into a fight with another inmate. In a video obtained by a local television station, Perez is heard screaming for his medication. After being denied anti-seizure medication, at the age of 36, Perez was found dead due to seizure and heart problems. In 2019, Perez's girlfriend was awarded $3.5 million in a settlement over his death.

=== Eugene Castelle ===
Staten Island native Eugene "Sonny" Castelle was battling an addiction to painkillers when he was arrested in Florida for heroin possession with intent to sell. This arrest was in violation of the terms of a drug-related plea agreement in New York. On November 2, 2016, Castelle was sent to Rikers and was found dead six days later, at the Anna M. Kross Center. An inmate told the Daily News that Castelle had taken another prisoner's prescription dose of methadone when he died. Castelle was vomiting and struggling to stand. Another inmate helped Castelle to 'the bubble' watch post to ask for medical help. The correctional officer inside was sleeping, and angrily dismissed them both, the inmate said. The following morning, Castelle was found by a correctional officer and medical staff unresponsive and was declared dead seven minutes later.

=== Layleen Xtravaganza Cubilette-Polanco ===
Layleen Xtravaganza Cubilette-Polanco was a 27-year-old Afro-Latina transgender woman who died at Rikers Island, New York City's main jail complex, on June 7, 2019, in solitary confinement. After a six-month investigation, the New York City Department of Investigation (DOI) and Bronx District Attorney Darcel Clark found that staff members at the women's facility left Polanco alone for up to 47 minutes, violating requirements to check on prisoners in solitary confinement in 15 minute intervals. It also found that staff members were not criminally responsible for Polanco's death.

A video of the incident revealed that multiple staff members knocked on Polanco's cell door and that she was unresponsive. In the presence of her unresponsive body, officers could be seen laughing. The DOI stated that officers thought Polanco was napping and that the laughter was unrelated. A wrongful death lawsuit was filed by David Shanies, the attorney for the Polanco family. Shanies claimed that records showed that Polanco's epilepsy was "well known" and that she had suffered multiple seizures while at Rikers and that footage showed staff failed to provide Polanco with medical care that could have saved her life. Polanco's death reignited conversations about banning cash bail and pretrial detention. Melania Brown, Polanco's sister, and many others called for banning solitary confinement in New York City after Polanco's death. Polanco was the tenth black trans woman to die in 2019.

=== COVID and 2020s ===
Conditions on Rikers Island drastically deteriorated during the COVID-19 pandemic in the United States, due to a combination of viral outbreaks, staffing shortages, and exacerbated mental health crises among detainees. There were 15 reported deaths of incarcerated people on Rikers Island in 2021: William Diaz-Guzman, age 30; Tomas Carlo Camacho, age 48; Javier Valasco, age 37; Thomas Earl Braunson III, age 35; Richard Blake, age 45; Jose Mejia Martinez, age 34; Robert Jackson, age 42; Brandon Rodriguez, age 25; Segundo Guallpa, age 58; Esias Johnson, age 24; Isa Abdul-Karim, age 41; Stephan Khadu, age 24; Victor Mercado, age 64; Malcolm Boatwright, age 28; and William Brown, age 55. Chief Medical Officer Ross McDonald attributed recent deaths to worsening conditions of the jail since the outbreak of COVID-19, calling the situation representative of a "new and worsening emergency".

Year	Deaths
2022	19
2023	9
2024	5
2025	15
2026	4 as of June

== Notable detainees ==
- Rodney Alcala – Serial killer known as the Dating Game Killer. Extradited from California's death row to New York for the murders of two young women from 1971, and 1977. Stayed in Rikers Island awaiting trial in 2012.
- David Berkowitz – Serial killer known as the Son of Sam. Spent time at Rikers prior to being transferred to numerous facilities over the years.
- Mark David Chapman – Murdered former Beatles member John Lennon. Spent time at Rikers Island.
- Anna Delvey – Russian born con artist. Detained on Rikers Island between 2017–2019 while awaiting trial.
- DMX – American rapper. Served 70 days for parole violation in 2005.
- ASAP Rocky – Served two weeks for involvement in a brawl in 2006.
- Tupac Shakur – Housed in Rikers Island for sexually assaulting a fan in 1994.
- Sid Vicious – lead singer of The Sex Pistols underwent drug rehabilitation on Rikers Island.
- Lil Wayne – Spent time for gun charges in 2010.
- Harvey Weinstein – Sexual offender and film producer.

== See also ==
- Alligator Alcatraz (Florida)
- Bronx court system delays
- Cook County Jail (Chicago)
- Harris County, Texas jails (Houston)
- List of jail facilities in New York City
- Men's Central Jail (Los Angeles)
- The Night Of episodes 3–5 which revolve around an incarceration at Ryker's Island
- Twin Towers Correctional Facility (Los Angeles)

== Bibliography ==
- Venters, Homer (2019) Life and Death in Rikers Island. Baltimore, Maryland: Johns Hopkins University Press. ISBN 9781421427355
