= New York City Department of Correction =

New York City government agency

- NYCD shield (officer)

- Flag
- Abbreviation: NYCD
- Motto: New York's Boldest

Agency overview
- Formed: 1895
- Preceding agency: Department of Public Charities and Correction
- Employees: 7,159 (FY 2026)
- Annual budget: $1.21 billion (FY 2026)

Jurisdictional structure
- Operations jurisdiction: New York City, United States
- Map of New York City Department of Correction's jurisdiction
- Legal jurisdiction: New York State
- Constituting instrument: New York City Charter
- General nature: Civilian police

Operational structure
- Headquarters: East Elmhurst, Queens
- Correction Officers: 5,619 (FY 2026)
- Commissioner responsible: Stanley Richards
- Agency executives: Francis Torres, First Deputy Commissioner; Sherrieann Rembert, Chief of Staff/Bureau Chief

Website
- Official Site

The New York City Department of Correction (NYCDOC) is the branch of the municipal government of New York City which is responsible for the custody, control, and care of New York City's imprisoned, with the majority of New York City's imprisoned population housed on Rikers Island.

The NYCDOC employs 7,060 uniformed officers and 1,727 civilian staff, has over 700 vehicles, and processes over 100,000 new inmates every year, retaining a population of approximately 6,000 inmates at any given time. Its motto is "New York's Boldest". The New York City Department of Corrections' regulations are compiled in title 39 of the New York City Rules.

Previously located in Manhattan, the Department of Correction headquarters is now located in the Bulova Corporate Center on Astoria Boulevard, in East Elmhurst, Queens. The agency is headed by a Commissioner, who is chosen and appointed by the mayor of New York City. The Commissioner reports to the Deputy Mayor of Public Safety.

The New York City Police Department is the primary policing and investigation agency within New York City as per the NYC Charter, They respond to all incidents that involves a NYC Department of Correction employee.

== History ==
The New York City Department of Correction was first founded as a separate entity in New York City in 1895 after a split from the Department of Public Charities and Correction. Roosevelt Island, then called Blackwell's Island, was the main penal institution under the jurisdiction of the DOC until the 1930s when it was closed. The penal institutions moved to Rikers Island, which the city purchased for $180,000, where 10 prisons and 6,000 inmates are now held.

Historians have not described the prison system of New York in the 19th century in a favorable light - with employment positions being awarded based on the spoils system and employees being characterized as largely corrupt. The Blackwell's Island penitentiary is described as having lax security, where prisoners were able to escape if they knew how to swim.

In 1995, the New York City jail system was one of the most violent in the United States, averaging more than 100 stabbings and slashings per month. Between January 1995 and January 2002, the department achieved a 93% reduction in inmate on inmate violence as a result of a management system recognized by Harvard University's John F. Kennedy School of Government, called Total Efficiency Accountability Management System (TEAMS). By 2007, the number of stabbings was reduced to 19, making that year the Department of Correction's safest on record, although the issue of underreporting of incidents has not been addressed.

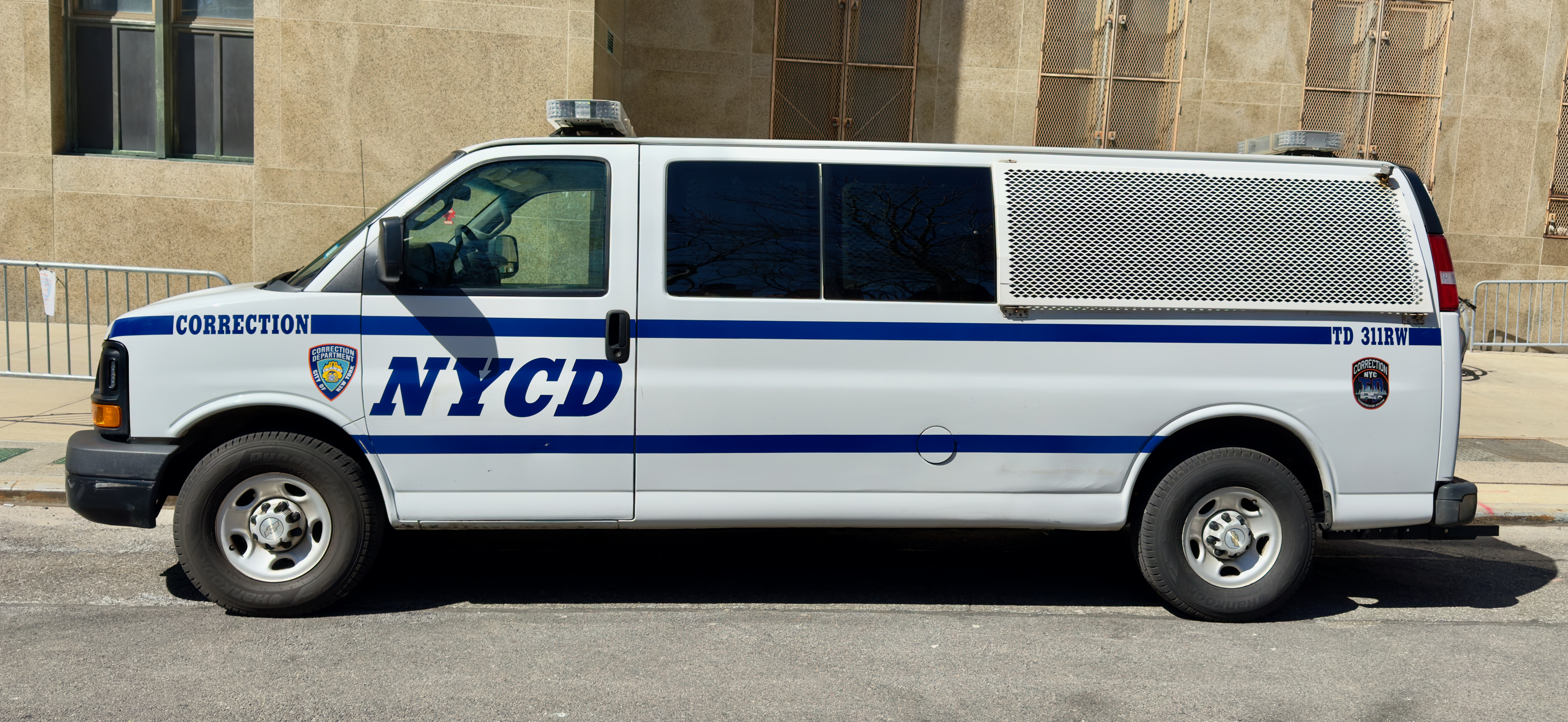
NYCD 2010s Chevrolet Express

In 2009, former commissioner of both the Missouri and Arizona prison systems Dora Schriro was selected to head the department, with some citing a need in the department for a boost in morale. Schriro was named in several federal court cases such as Schriro v. Smith and Schriro v. Summerlin. Schriro served with the United States Department of Homeland Security prior to coming to the department.

== Responsibilities ==
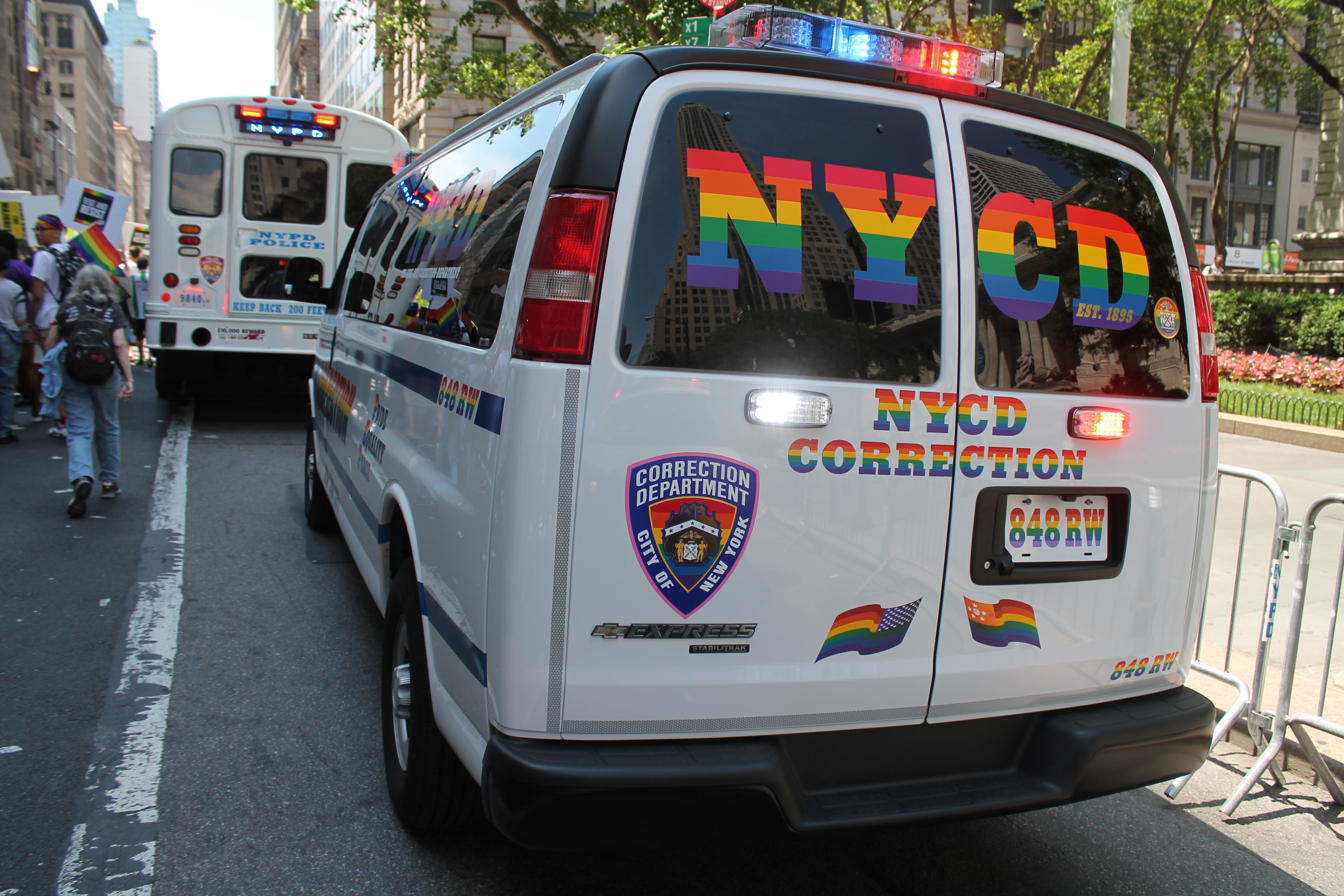
NYCD van

Correction officers are responsible for the care, control, custody, work performance and job training of inmates. Duties include:

- Inspecting facilities for safety and security, and safeguarding supplies and equipment.
- Supervising meals, recreation, and visitors.
- Maintaining logs.
- Interacting with inmates, and recommending medical and/or psychiatric referrals.
- Escorting and transporting inmates within and outside of the facility.

== Command Structure ==
There are nine titles (referred to as ranks) in the New York City Department of Correction.

From highest to lowest, the uniformed ranks are:

Correction Department ranks

| Title | Insignia |
|---|---|
| Chief of Department | |
| Bureau Chief / Deputy Chief / Chief of Staff | |
| Assistant Chief / Supervising Warden | |
| Warden | |
| Deputy Warden in Command | |
| Deputy Warden / Facility Administrative Chaplain | |
| Assistant Deputy Warden / Chaplain | |
| Captain | |
| Correction Officer/Correction Officer Investigator | |

There are certain civilian leadership positions in the agency which have power equivalent to the high ranking uniformed personnel. If they outrank a present uniformed officer, they are saluted due to agency customs and courtesies.

Civilian Leadership ranks From highest to lowest, the civilian leadership ranks are:

| Title | Insignia |
|---|---|
| Commissioner | |
| First Deputy Commissioner | |
| Chief of Staff | |
| Deputy Commissioner | |
| Associate Commissioner | |
| Assistant Commissioner | |

The Commissioner is the highest-ranking official in the agency and is in command of all uniformed and civilian personnel.

=== Powers and Authority ===
Under New York Criminal Procedure Law (CPL), 2.10 Corrections Officers are Peace Officers and are afforded a limited range of authority.

=== Firearms ===
Correction officers are trained in the use of a firearm, but are only armed on certain post assignments due to the potential threat of prisoners overpowering an officer. On duty firearm is provided (Smith & Wesson 5946 DAO) however should the member elect there is a list of authorized firearms such as Glock pistol. For officers hired before March 1994, the model 10 & 64 revolvers are still used.

=== Uniforms ===
NYCD Officers wear a similar uniform to other New York City Law Enforcement Agencies in dark-blue style.

Different uniforms exist for different units, such as ESU.

=== Vehicles ===
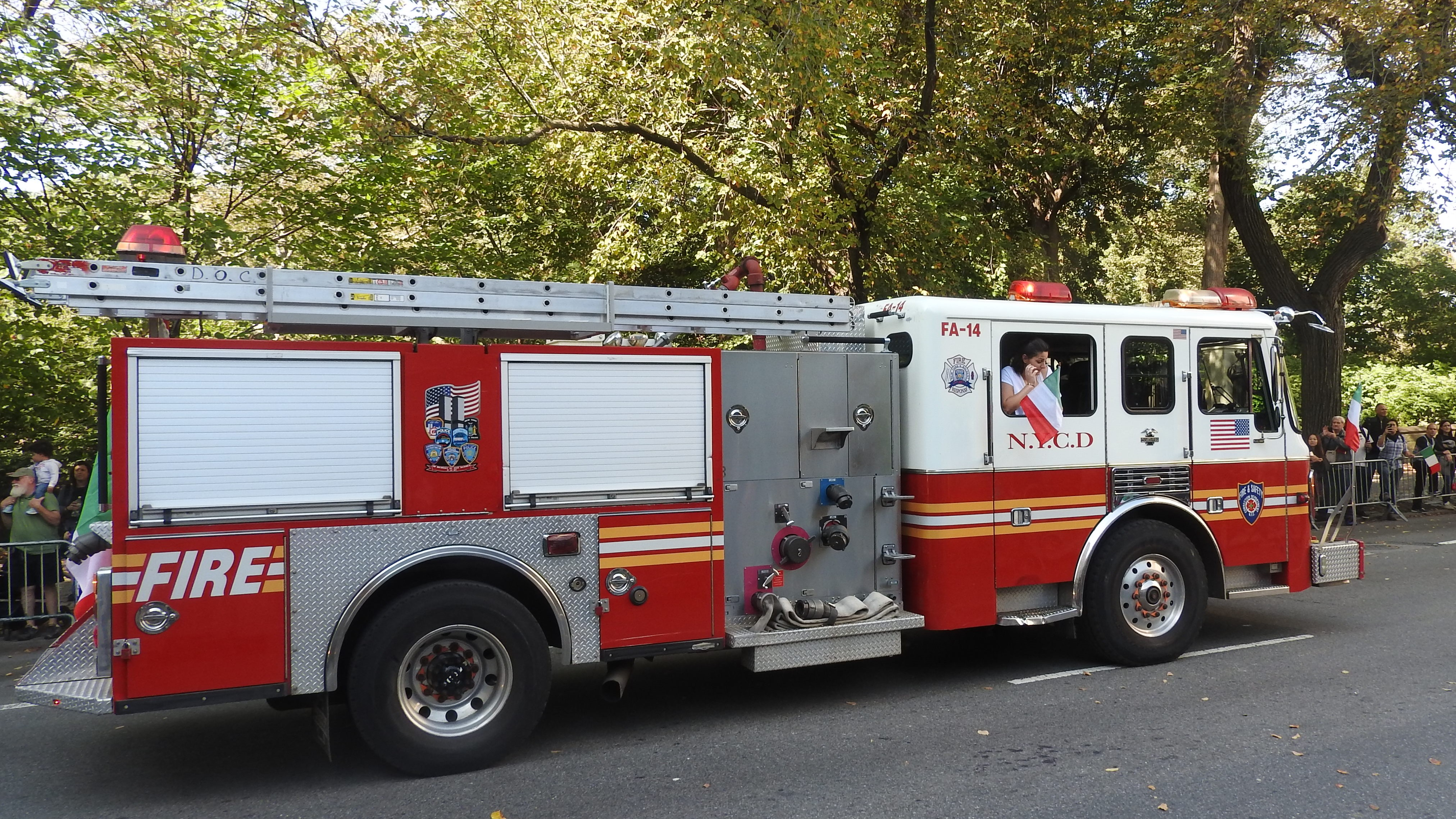
NYCD Firetruck FA-14, in 2019

The department uses numerous marked vehicles including Chevrolet Impalas, Ford vans, transport buses, fire trucks, and riot vehicles. They share the distinctive NYC Law Enforcement colour scheme of blue-and-white, with the NYCD patch, red-white-blue/yellow (rear) flashing lights and sirens.

=== Units ===
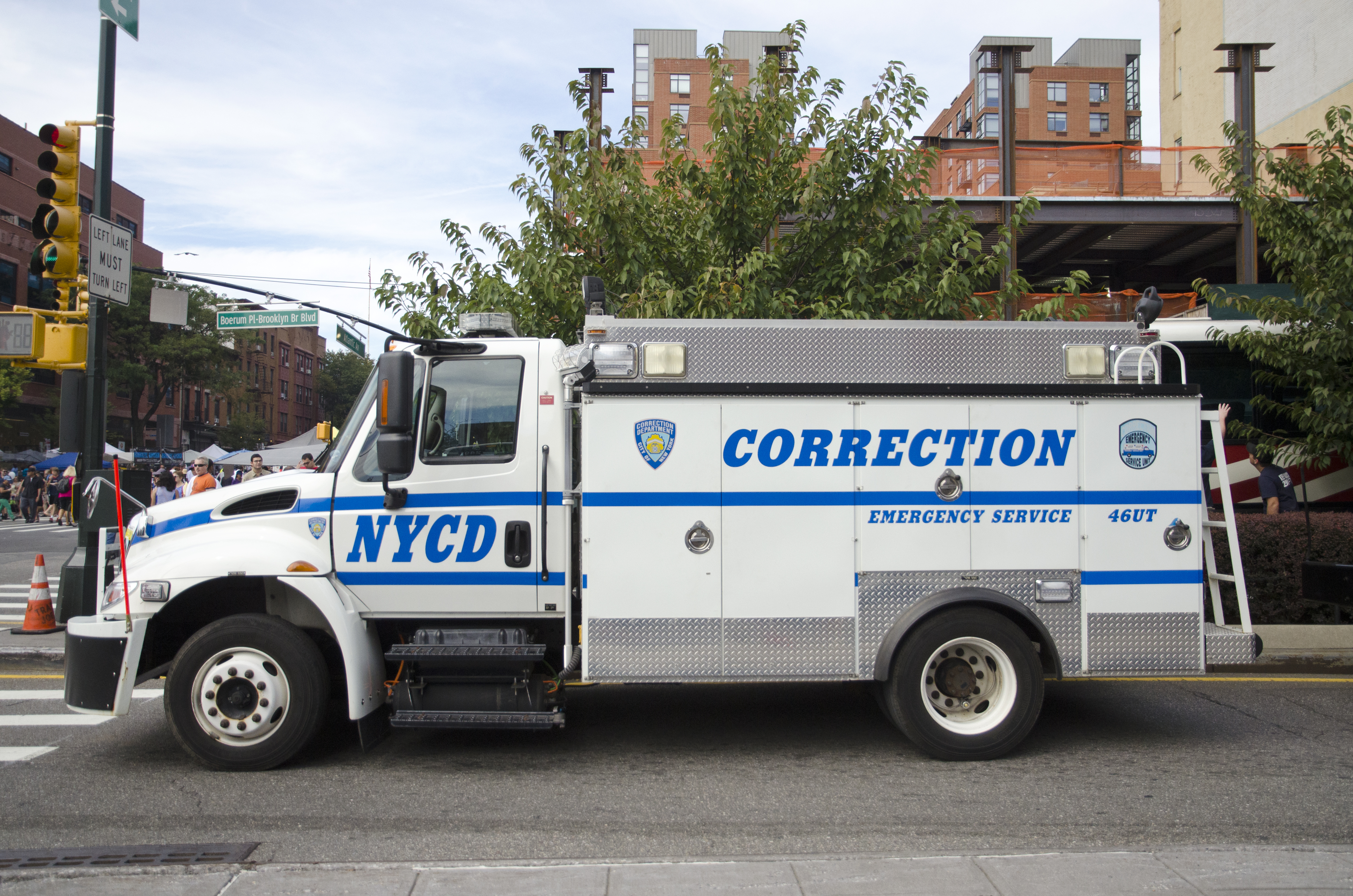
NYCD Emergency Service Unit (ESU) Truck

The Department has a number of different units/divisions, for various tasks within the Department.

Administration

- Applicant Investigation Unit
- Correction Academy

Operational

- K-9 Unit
- Fire Safety Unit (FSU)
- Emergency Service Unit (ESU)
- Transportation Division

Support

- Firearms & Tactics Unit (FTU)
- Communications Unit
- Correction Assistance Response for Employees (CARE)
- Facility Maintenance and Repair Division

== Facilities ==
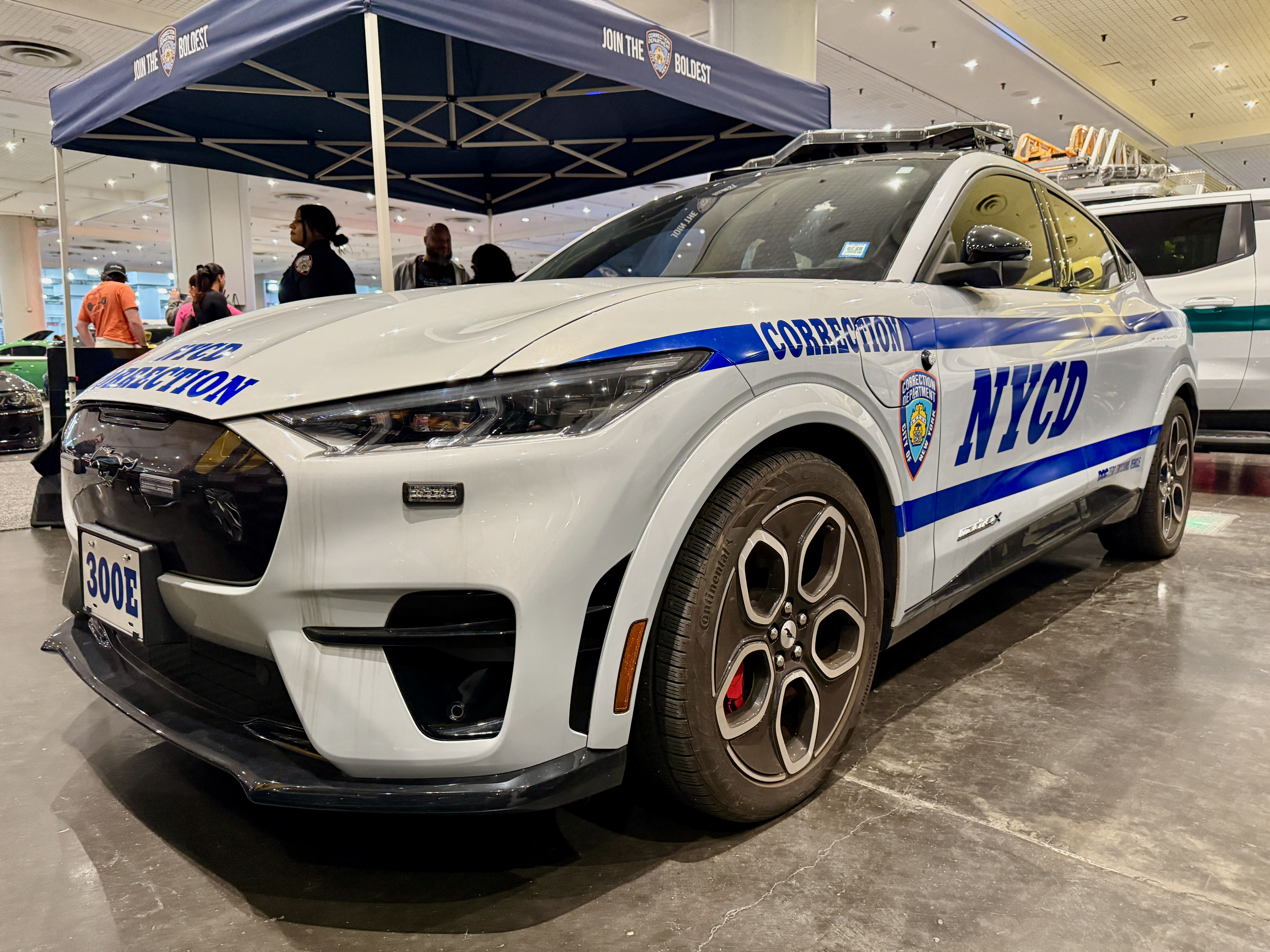
Ford Mustang Mach-E GT of New York City Department of Correction

Rikers Island is the main correctional facility.

=== Borough Based Facilities ===
- Manhattan Detention Complex
- Brooklyn Detention Complex
- Queens Detention Complex

Horizon Juvenile Center serves as the juvenile facility. The final juvenile inmates on Rikers Island were moved to Horizon in 2018. The move was prompted by a law passed by New York state in 2017 requiring that juvenile inmates under 18 be housed separately from adults.

== Notable employees ==
- Sharon Jones, served as a corrections officer at Rikers Island.
- Bernard Kerik, served as Commissioner from 1994 to 2001. Kerik became Correction Commissioner after retiring from the NYPD as a detective.
- Anna M. Kross, served as Commissioner from 1953 to 1966. Developed the NYC Corrections R&D arm to research recidivism methods. She campaigned for legislation to treat addicts and alcoholics as people with medical rather than criminal conditions. Second woman to hold the position.
- Mickey Marcus, Commissioner in 1940 - Would go on to serve in World War II with the United States Army and later join the Israeli Defense Force and be instrumental in leading their forces during that country's independence movement.
- Louis Molina, served as Commissioner from 2022 to 2023. Molina was named Assistant Deputy Mayor for Public Safety followed by Commissioner of the New York City Department of Citywide Administrative Services after his departure from the Department.
- Anthony S. Seminerio, former NY state assemblyman
- Leo C. Zeferetti, former US Congressman

== See also ==
- Corrections
- List of jail facilities in New York City
- List of law enforcement agencies in New York
- New York City Board of Correction
- New York State Department of Corrections and Community Supervision
- New York City Department of Probation
- Roosevelt Island
